= Al (given name) =

- Al Gore's official portrait
- Pronunciation: /æl/ AL
- Gender: Unisex (mostly male)
- Language: English

Origin
- Origin: Diminutive form of names beginning in Al-
- Region of origin: English-speaking world

Other names
- Related names: Alfred, Albert, Alphonse, Allen, Allan, Alan, Alex, Alexander

The nickname Al is often short for Alfred, Albert, Alphonse, Alphons, Allen, Allan, Alan, and other male or female names beginning with Al-.

People named Al include:

== Art, entertainment, and media ==
=== Art ===
- Al Agnew (born 1952), American naturalist painter
- Al Avison (1920–1984), American comic book artist
- Al Bernstein (born 1949), Austrian artist
- Al Bertino (1912–1996), American animator
- Al Blaustein (1924–2004), American painter and printmaker
- Al Boeke (1922–2011), American architect and developer
- Al Buell (1910–1996), American painter
- Al Capp (1909–1979), American cartoonist and humorist
- Al Carbee (1914–2005), American artist
- Al Clayton (1934–2014), American photographer
- Al Columbia (born 1970), American cartoonist
- Al Dimalanta, Filipino musician, writer, public relations practitioner, photographer, visual artist, and professor
- Al Escudero (born c. 1966), American computer game designer
- Al Fagaly (1909–1963), American cartoonist
- Al Freeman (born 1981), Canadian artist
- Al Gabriele, American comic book artist
- Al Gordon (born 1953), American comic book inker and writer
- Al Hansen (1927–1995), American artist
- Al Hartley (1921–2003), American comic book writer and artist
- Al Held (1928–2005), American abstract painter
- Al Hirschfeld (1903–2003), American caricaturist
- Al Jackson (born 1964), American artist and painter
- Al Jaffee (1921–2023), American cartoonist
- Al Jarnow (born 1945), American artist, animator, sculptor, and filmmaker
- Al Kilgore (1927–1983), American artist, cartoonist, and filmmaker
- Al Lowe (born 1946), American video game designer and developer
- Al McWilliams (1916–1993), American cartoonist
- Al Milgrom (born 1950), American comic book writer, penciller, inker, and editor
- Al Nisbet (born 1958), Scottish-New Zealand cartoonist
- Al Pabian (1918–2015), American animator
- Al Parker (1906–1985), American artist and illustrator
- Al Plastino (1921–2013), American comic book artist
- Al Posen (1894–1960), American cartoonist
- Al Qöyawayma, American potter and bronze sculptor
- Al Rio (1962–2012), Brazilian comic book artist
- Al Rockoff (born 1946), American photojournalist
- Al Rosenbaum (1926–2009), American artist
- Al Scaduto (1928–2007), American cartoonist
- Al Smith (1902–1986), American cartoonist
- Al Spalding (1932–2022), American naval architect
- Al Taliaferro (1905–1969), American cartoonist
- Al J Thompson (born 1980), Jamaican-American photographer
- Al Urban (1917–1992), American photographer
- Al Vandenberg (1932–2012), American photographer
- Al Vermeer (1911–1980), American cartoonist
- Al Williamson (1931–2010), American cartoonist, comic book artist, and illustrator
- Al Wiseman (1918–1988), American cartoonist

=== Acting, broadcasting, and production ===
- Al Adamson (1929–1995), American filmmaker and actor
- Al Mamun Al Siyam (born 1993), Bangladeshi film actor
- Al Albert, American sportscaster
- Al Alleborn (1892–1968), American film director and stuntman
- Al Anstey (born 1966), American media executive, strategic advisor, and businessman
- Al Anthony (born 1930), American radio personality and DJ
- Al Baker (1874–1951), American magician
- Al Bandiero, American actor and radio personality
- Al Boasberg (1891–1937), American screenwriter and film director
- Al Brodax (1926–2016), American film and television producer
- Al Bruner (1923–1987), Canadian television broadcaster, co-founder of the Global Television Network
- Al Carmines (1936–2005), American playwriter and actor
- Al Checco (1921–2015), American actor
- Al Christy (1918–1995), American actor, advertising executive, and radio and television announcer
- Al Ciraldo (1921–1997), American sportscaster
- Al Clark (1902–1971), American film editor
- Al Clark, Australian film producer
- Al Cliver (born 1951), Italian actor
- Al Coates, Canadian radio broadcaster
- Al Corley (born 1956), American actor, singer, and producer
- Al Daff (1902–1991), Australian filmmaker and executive
- Al Debbo (1924–2011), South African comedian, singer, and actor
- Al DiSarro (1951–2011), American visual effects artist
- Al Ducharme, American stand-up comedian
- Al Eschbach, American radio personality
- Al Eugster (1909–1997), American animator, writer, and film director
- Al Ferguson (1888–1971), Irish-American film actor
- Al G. Field (1848/1850–1921), American performer and minstrel show producer
- Al Flosso (1895–1976), American magician and entertainer
- Al Franken (born 1951), American comedian, writer, actor, media personality, and politician
- Al Freeman Jr. (1934–2012), American actor, director, and educator
- Al Ernest Garcia (1887–1938), American actor and casting director
- Al Goldstein (1936–2013), American adult journalist, filmmaker, and photographer
- Al Gordon (1923–2012), American television writer
- Al Gregg (born 1963), English actor, writer, and musician
- Al Gross, American broadcaster and radio host
- Al Groves, British record producer
- Al Guest, Canadian animation producer
- Al Gurdon, British broadcast lighting designer
- Al Harrington (1935–2021), Samoan-American actor
- Al Hart (c. 1927–2016), American radio broadcaster
- Al Helfer (1911–1975), American radio sportscaster
- Al Hill (1892–1954), American actor
- Al Hodge (1912–1979), American actor
- Al Hoxie (1901–1982), American film actor
- Al Hunt (born 1942), American news anchor and journalist
- Al Hunter Ashton (1957–2007), English actor and scriptwriter
- Al Israel, (1935–2011), American actor
- Al Jaffe, American media executive and journalist
- Al Jean (born 1961), American screenwriter and television producer
- Al Jolson (1886–1950), Lithuanian-American singer, comedian, actor, and vaudevillian
- Al Kaprielian, American meteorologist
- Al Kelly (1896–1966), Russian-American comedian
- Al Kikume (1894–1972), American actor and stuntman
- Al Kresta (1951–2024), American broadcaster, journalist, and author
- Al Lee (born 1893, date of death unknown), American actor, producer, and manager
- Al Lehman (1924–2001), American costume designer
- Al Leong (born 1952), American stuntman and actor
- Al Lettieri (1928–1975), American actor
- Al Lewis (1923–2006), American actor and activist
- Al Lichtman (1888–1958), Hungarian-American film salesman and film producer
- Al Liguori (1885–1951), Italian-American cinematographer
- Al Lindner (born 1944), American television and radio personality and fisherman
- Al Lohman (1933–2002), American radio personality and comedian
- Al Madrigal (born 1971), American comedian, writer, actor, and producer
- Al Mancini (1932–2007), American actor
- Al Markim (1927–2015), American film and television actor
- Al Martin (1897–1971), American screenwriter
- Al Masini (1930–2010), American television producer
- Al Matthews (1942–2018), American actor and singer
- Al McCann (1930–2015), Canadian play-by-play sports announcer
- Al McCoy (1933–2024), American sportscaster and play-by-play announcer
- Al Jafree Md Yusop, Malaysian writer and director
- Al Meltzer (1928–2018), American sportscaster
- Al Michaels (born 1944), American sportscaster and play-by-play announcer
- Al Molinaro (1919–2015), American actor
- Al Morgan (1920–2011), American producer and writer
- Al Mukadam (born 1984), Canadian actor
- Al Mulock (1926–1968), Canadian actor
- Al Murray (born 1968), English stand-up comedian, actor, musician, and writer
- Al Overton (1912–1985), American sound engineer
- Al Overton Jr., American sound engineer
- Al Pacino (born 1940), American actor and director
- Al Parker (1952–1992), American adult film actor, producer, and director
- Al Pitcher (born 1972), New Zealand stand-up comedian
- Al Porter (born 1993), Irish comedian, actor, and radio broadcaster
- Al Primo (1935–2022), American television news executive
- Al Rabin (1936–2012), American television producer
- Al Rantel (born 1955), American talk show host
- Al Read (1909–1987), British radio comedian and businessman
- Al Reeves (1864–1940), American vaudeville and minstrel show entertainer, vocalist, and banjo player
- Al Reinert (1947–2018), American journalist, film director, screenwriter, and producer
- Al Ritz (1901–1965), American comedian, actor, and entertainer
- Al Rockett, American movie producer
- Al Rodrigo, American actor
- Al Roelofs (1906–1990), Dutch-American film art director
- Al Roker (born 1954), American television broadcaster, journalist, and author
- Al Rosen (1910–1990), American actor
- Al Ruscio (1924–2013), American actor
- Al Sabith (born 2007), Indian actor and television host
- Al Sanders (1941–1995), American television news anchorman
- Al Santos, American actor and model
- Al Sapienza (born 1962), American actor
- Al Schneider (born 1943), American magician, author, physicist, and mathematician
- Al Schottelkotte (1927–1996), American news anchor and reporter
- Al Schwartz (1910–1988), American screenwriter, television producer, and director
- Al Schwartz (born 1932), American television producer
- Al Sharpton (born 1954), American television personality, radio talk show host, politician, Baptist minister, and civil rights and social justice activist
- Al Shaver, Canadian sportscaster
- Al Shea (1927–2009), American actor and theatre critic
- Al Shean (1868–1949), German-American comedian and vaudeville performer
- Al Shearer (born 1977), American actor
- Al Simon (1911–2000), American producer and production manager
- Al St. John (1892–1963), American silent film actor and comedian
- Al Strobel (1940–2022), American actor
- Al Swearengen (1845–1904), American entertainment entrepreneur and pimp
- Al Tantay (born 1956), Filipino actor, comedian, and director
- Al Taylor (1887–1951), American actor
- Al Terzi, American news anchor
- Al Thompson (1884–1960), American actor
- Al Trautwig (1956–2025), American sports commentator
- Al Voecks, American radio personality
- Al Wasserman (1921–2005), American documentary filmmaker
- Al Waxman (1935–2001), Canadian actor and director
- Al Weaver (born 1981), English actor and writer
- Al Wester (1923–2018), American sportscaster
- Al White (born 1942), American actor
- Al Wilson (1895–1932), American actor, producer, and stunt pilot
- Al Wiman, American news reporter
- Al Wohlman, American actor and vaudeville performer
- Al Wong (born 1939), American experimental filmmaker and artist
- Al Zimbalist (1910–1975), Russian-American film producer

=== Music ===
- Al Aarons (1932–2015), American jazz trumpeter
- Al Alberts (1922–2009), American singer and composer
- Al Anderson (born 1947), American rock guitarist, singer, and songwriter
- Al Anderson (born 1950), American songwriter and guitarist
- Al Atkins (born 1947), lead vocalist and founder of the British heavy metal band Judas Priest
- Al Bano (born 1943), Italian singer, actor, and winemaker
- Al Barr (born 1968), American musician and lead singer of the American punk band Dropkick Murphys
- Al Barrow (born 1968), English bassist
- Al Beeno, Jamaican reggae dancehall DJ
- Al Bell (born 1940), American record producer, songwriter, and record executive
- Al Belletto (1928–2014), American jazz saxophonist and clarinetist
- Al Benson (1908–1978), American radio DJ, music promoter, and record label owner
- Al Berard (1960–2014), American Cajun musician, recording artist, and composer
- Al Bernard (1888–1949), American singer
- Al Bowlly (1898–1941), South African-British singer and guitarist
- Al Burnett (1906–1973), British impresario
- Al Burton (1928–2019), American composer, conductor, consultant, producer, production manager, and screenwriter
- Al Caiola (1920–2016), American guitarist, composer, and arranger
- Al Caldwell, American musician
- Al Campbell (born 1954), Jamaican reggae singer
- Al Campbell, American keyboardist
- Al Capps (1939–2018), American record producer, arranger, songwriter, multi-instrumentalist, and vocalist
- Al Casey (1915–2005), American jazz guitarist
- Al Casey (1936–2006), American rock guitarist
- Al Cass (1923–1989), American inventor, performer, trumpeter, manufacturer, and consultant
- Al Castellanos, Cuban bandleader
- Al Cherney (1932–1989), Canadian fiddler
- Al Ciner (born 1947), American guitarist
- Al Cisneros (born 1973), American musician
- Al Clauser (1911–1989), American guitarist, songwriter, and engineer
- Al Cleveland (1930–1996), American songwriter
- Al Cohen (1926–2020), American musician
- Al Cohn (1925–1988), American jazz saxophonist, arranger, and composer
- Al Connelly (born 1960), Canadian guitarist and songwriter
- Al Conti (born 1968), Argentine composer, arranger, producer, and multi-instrumentalist
- Al Cooper (1911–1981), American jazz saxophonist and clarinetist
- Al Copley (born 1952), American blues pianist and singer
- Al Coury (1934–2013), American music record executive and producer
- Al Cromwell (1938–1995), Canadian blues and folk musician
- Al Crowder (1904–1981), American radio host, music teacher, and humorist
- Al De Lory (1930–2012), American record producer, arranger, conductor, and session musician
- Al Denson (born 1960), American musician and radio and television host
- Al Dexter (1905–1984), American country musician and songwriter
- Al Di Meola (born 1954), American guitarist
- Al Donahue (1904–1983), American violinist and bandleader
- Al Doughty (born 1966), English musician and bassist
- Al Downing (1940–2005), American musician and entertainer
- Al Doyle (born 1980), British musician
- Al Dreares (1927–2011), American jazz drummer
- Al Drootin (1916–2016), American jazz clarinetist and saxophonist
- Al Dubin (1891–1945), American lyricist
- Al Duncan (1927–1995), American drummer and songwriter
- Al Dvorin (1922–2004), American music promoter, concert announcer, and talent agent
- Al Fairweather (1927–1993), British jazz trumpeter
- Al Fletcher (1970–2016), English drummer
- Al Foster (1943–2025), American jazz drummer
- Al Gafa (born 1941), American jazz guitarist
- Al Gallodoro (1913–2008), American jazz clarinetist and saxophonist
- Al Gamble (born 1969), American session musician
- Al Gay (1928–2013), British jazz tenor saxophonist
- Al Gomes, American record producer and songwriter
- Al Goodhart (1905–1955), American radio announcer, pianist, and special materials writer
- Al Goodman (1890–1972), Ukrainian-American conductor, songwriter, stage composer, musical director, arranger, and pianist
- Al Goodman (1943–2010), American singer and songwriter
- Al Gorgoni (born 1939), American guitarist, composer, arranger, and producer
- Al Green (born 1946), American R&B singer, songwriter, pastor, and record producer
- Al Green, American record industry executive
- Al Greenwood (born 1951), American rock musician
- Al Grey (1925–2000), American jazz trombonist
- Al Gromer Khan (born 1946), German sitar player and composer
- Al Haig (1922–1982), American jazz pianist
- Al Hall (1915–1988), American jazz bassist
- Al Ham (1925–2001), American composer and jingle writer
- Al Harewood (1923–2014), American jazz drummer and teacher
- Al Hawkes (1930–2018), American musician and producer
- Al Hayse (1921–1982), American jazz trombonist
- Al Hazan (1934–2019), American recording artist, songwriter, and record producer
- Al Hendrickson (1920–2007), American jazz guitarist and vocalist
- Al Hibbler (1915–2001), American baritone vocalist
- Al Hirt (1922–1999), American trumpeter and bandleader
- Al Hodge (1950–2006), Cornish guitarist, singer, and songwriter
- Al Hoffman (1902–1960), American song composer
- Al Hopkins (1889–1932), American musician
- Al Howard (1927–2020), American night club owner
- Al Hunter, New Zealand singer-songwriter
- Al Hurricane (1936–2017), American singer-songwriter
- Al Hurricane Jr. (born 1956), American singer-songwriter
- Al Jackson Jr. (1935–1975), American drummer, producer, and songwriter
- Al James (born 1991), Filipino rapper and songwriter
- Al Jardine (born 1942), American musician, co-founder of The Beach Boys
- Al Jarreau (1940–2017), American singer and musician
- Al Jewer, Native American flutist
- Al Johnson (1948–2013), American singer, arranger, producer
- Al Jolson (1886–1950), American singer and actor
- Al Jones (1930–1976), American jazz drummer
- Al Jones (1945–2008), English folk and blues songwriter, guitarist, and singer
- Al Jourgensen (born 1958), Cuban-American singer, musician, and music producer
- Al Kapone (born 1975), American rapper
- Al Kasha (1937–2020), American songwriter
- Al Kavelin (1903–1982), American bandleader
- Al Killian (1916–1950), American jazz trumpeter and bandleader
- Al King (1923–1999), American blues singer and songwriter
- Al Klink (1915–1991), American jazz tenor saxophonist
- Al Kooper (born 1944 as Alan Peter Kuperschmidt), American songwriter, record producer, and musician
- Al Kuan, Malaysian music producer, recording engineer, songwriter, copyright manager, columnist, and artists agent
- Al Sherrod Lambert (born 1985), American producer, singer, songwriter, and musician
- Al Lerner (1919–2014), American pianist, composer, arranger, and conductor
- Al Levitt (1932–1994), American jazz drummer
- Al Lewis (1901–1967), American lyricist, songwriter, and music publisher
- Al Lewis (1902–1992), American jazz banjoist
- Al Lewis (born 1984), Welsh singer-songwriter
- Al Lucas (1916–1983), Canadian jazz double-bassist
- Al Marconi (born 1969), English guitarist
- Al Martino (1927–2009), American singer and actor
- Al McKay (born 1948), American guitarist, songwriter, and record producer
- Al McKibbon (1919–2005), American jazz double bassist
- Al Melgard (1890–1977), American organist
- Al Minns (1920–1985), American jazz dancer
- Al Morgan (1908–1974), American jazz double-bassist
- Al Morgan (1915–1989), American nightclub singer, pianist, and composer
- Al J. Neiburg (1902–1978), American lyricist
- Al Nevins (1915–1965), American musician, producer, arranger, guitarist, and violinist
- Al Oster (1924–2017), Canadian singer
- Al Paton, South African musician
- Al Pearce (1898–1961), American comedian, singer, and banjo player
- Al Perkins (born 1944), American guitarist
- Al Petteway, American guitarist
- Al Piantadosi (1882–1955), American composer
- Al Pike (born 1961), American bass guitarist
- Al Pitrelli, American guitarist
- Al Porcino (1925–2013), American trumpeter
- Al Reed (1925-1990), American R&B pianist
- Al Rex (1928–2020), American bass player
- Al Rinker (1907–1982), American musician
- Al B. Romano (born 1965), American rock guitarist, songwriter, and producer
- Al Sack (1911–1947), American conductor, composer, arranger, and violinist
- Al Schackman (born 1933), American jazz guitarist and arranger
- Al Schmitt (1930–2021), American recording engineer and record producer
- Al Schnier (born 1968), American musician
- Al Scorch, American singer-songwriter, banjo player, and guitarist
- Al Sears (1910–1990), American jazz tenor saxophonist and bandleader
- Al Sherman (1897–1973), Ukrainian-American songwriter and composer
- Al Shux, British record producer and songwriter
- Al Simmons (born 1948), Canadian musician and children's performer
- Al Staehely (born 1945), American singer-songwriter and entertainment lawyer
- Al Stewart (born 1945), English singer-songwriter and folk-rock musician
- Al Stillman (1901–1979), American lyricist
- Al B. Sure! (born 1968), American singer, songwriter, record producer, radio host, and record executive
- Al Tabor (1898–1983), English bandleader
- Al Timothy (1915–2000), Trinidadian jazz and calypso musician and songwriter
- Al Tinney (1921–2002), American jazz pianist
- Al Trace (1900–1993), American songwriter and orchestra leader
- Al Tuck (born 1966), Canadian songwriter and folksinger
- Al Viola (1919–2007), American jazz guitarist
- Al Walser (born 1976), Swiss-Liechtenstein singer, songwriter, and record producer
- Al Wilson (1939–2008), American singer
- Al G. Wright (1916–2020), American bandleader
- "Weird Al" Yankovic (born 1959), American parody singer and actor

=== Writing ===
- Al Abrams (1904–1977), American sportswriter and editor
- Al Altaev (1872–1959), penname of Soviet children's book author, Margarita Vladimirovna Rokotova
- Al Alvarez (1929–2019), English poet, novelist, essayist, and critic
- Al Aronowitz (1928–2005), American rock journalist
- Al Barkow (born 1932), American journalist, author, editor, lecturer, historian, and golfer
- Al Bernstein (born 1950), American sportscaster, writer, stage performer, recording artist, and public speaker
- Al Berto (1948–1997), Portuguese poet, painter, editor, and cultural programmer
- Al Burt (1927–2008), American author and journalist
- Al Carrell (1925–2014), American columnist, author, and radio personality
- Al Carter (born 1952), American reporter and sports columnist
- Al Cartwright (1917–2015), American sportswriter
- Al Clouston (1910–2004), Canadian storyteller and humorist
- Al Davison, English comic book writer and artist
- Al Delugach (1925–2015), American journalist
- Al Dempsey, American historical fiction author
- Al Ewing (born 1977), British comic book writer
- Al Fasoldt, American columnist
- Al Feldstein (1925–2014), American writer, editor, and artist
- Al Filreis (born 1956), American literary critic and professor
- Al Giordano (1959–2023), American journalist, political commentator, and environmental activist and organizer
- Al Hamilton, Jamaican-British journalist
- Al Hester (1932–2019), American columnist, historian, newspaper reporter, and author
- Al Hewetson (1946–2004), Scottish-Canadian writer and editor
- Al Hine (1915–1974), American novelist, reporter, and movie producer
- Al Hirshberg (1909–1973), American writer and sportswriter
- Al Hunter, Anishinaabe poet and journal writer
- Al Koran (1914–1972), British mentalist, author, and inventor
- Al Laney (1896–1988), American sportswriter
- Al Letson (born 1972), American writer, journalist, and radio and podcast host
- Al Lewis, American journalist
- Al Mahmud (1936–2019), Bangladeshi poet, novelist, and short-story writer
- Al G. Manning (1927–2006), American author, occultist, public accountant, and businessman
- Al Martinez (1929–2015), American columnist, television writer, and novelist
- Al McIntosh (1905–1979), American journalist and editor
- Al Mok, American author, computer scientist, and professor
- Al Morganti (born 1953), American sports journalist
- Al Mujahidi (born 1942), Bangladeshi poet
- Al Neuharth (1924–2013), American businessman, author, and columnist
- Al Perkins (1904–1975), American children's book writer
- Al Pittman (1940–2001), Canadian writer and teacher
- Al Prince (died 2010), American-French journalist and tourism expert
- Al Purdy (1918–2000), Canadian poet
- Al Ramsawack (1932–2021), Trinidad and Tobago folklorist, author, broadcaster, and educator
- Al Reimer (1927–2015), Canadian writer
- Al Richardson (1941–2003), British historian and activist
- Al Richmond (1914–1987), American writer and editor
- Al Ries (1926–2022), American author and marketing professional
- Al Robles (1930–2009), Filipino-American poet and community activist
- Al Sarrantonio (1952–2025), American writer, editor, and publisher
- Al Seckel (1958–2015), American author, collector, and skeptic
- Al Silverman (1926–2019), American sports writer and author
- Al Smith, British writer
- Al Strachan, Canadian sports author and journalist
- Al Stump (1916–1995), American author and sports writer
- Al J Venter (born 1938), South African war journalist, documentary filmmaker and author
- Al Weisel (1963–2010), American freelance writer
- Al Young (1939–2021), American poet, novelist, essayist, screenwriter, and professor

== Sports ==
=== Baseball ===
- Al Aber (1927–1993), American major league baseball pitcher
- Al Alburquerque (born 1986), Dominican major league baseball pitcher
- Al Atkinson (1861–1952), American major league baseball pitcher
- Al Autry (1952–2022), American major league baseball pitcher
- Al Avila (born 1958), Cuban baseball executive vice president and general manager of the Detroit Tigers
- Al Baird (1895–1976), American major league baseball player
- Al Baker (1906–1982), American major league baseball pitcher
- Al Barillari (1917–2000), American minor league baseball pitcher, manager, and scout
- Al Barker (1839–1912), American major league baseball player
- Al Barks (1936–2018), American major league baseball player
- Al Barlick (1915–1995), American major league baseball umpire
- Al Bashang (1888–1967), American major league baseball player and manager
- Al Bauer (1859–1944), American major league baseball pitcher
- Al Benton (1911–1968), American major league baseball pitcher
- Al Blanche (1909–1997), American major league baseball pitcher
- Al Bool (1897–1981), American major league baseball player
- Al Boucher (1881–1974), American major league baseball player
- Al Bradley (1856–1937), American major league baseball player
- Al Braithwood (1892–1960), American major league baseball pitcher
- Al Brancato (1919–2012), American major league baseball player
- Al Brazle (1913–1973), American major league baseball pitcher
- Al Bridwell (1884–1969), American major league baseball player
- Al Buckenberger (1861–1917), American major league baseball manager
- Al Bumbry (born 1947), American major league baseball player
- Al Burch (1883–1926), American major league baseball player
- Al Burris (1874–1938), American major league baseball pitcher
- Al Cabrera (1881–1964), Cuban major league baseball player
- Al Campanis (1916–1998), American major league baseball player and executive
- Al Carson (1882–1962), American major league baseball pitcher
- Al Chambers (born 1961), American major league baseball player
- Al Cicotte (1929–1982), American major league baseball pitcher
- Al Cihocki (1924–2014), American major league baseball player
- Al Clancy (1888–1951), American major league baseball player
- Al Clark (born 1948), American major league baseball umpire
- Al Clauss (1891–1952), American major league baseball pitcher
- Al Closter (born 1943), American major league baseball pitcher
- Al Corwin (1926–2003), American major league baseball pitcher
- Al Cowens (1951–2002), American major league baseball player
- Al Cuccinello (1914–2004), American major league baseball player
- Al Davis, American baseball player
- Al DeVormer (1891–1966), American major league baseball player
- Al Demaree (1884–1962), American major league baseball pitcher
- Al Downing (born 1941), American major league baseball pitcher
- Al Dwight (1856–1903), American major league baseball player
- Al Eckert (1906–1974), American major league baseball pitcher
- Al Elliott (1894–1975), American major league baseball player and football player
- Al Epperly (1918–2003), American major league baseball pitcher
- Al Evans (1916–1979), American major league baseball player and manager
- Al Federoff (1924–2011), American minor league baseball player and manager
- Al Ferrara (1939–2024), American major league baseball player
- Al Fitzmorris (1946–2024), American major league baseball pitcher
- Al Flair (1916–1988), American major league baseball player
- Al Forman (1928–2013), American baseball umpire
- Al Froehlich (1887–1916), American major league baseball player
- Al Gallagher (1945–2018), American major league baseball player
- Al Gardella (1918–2006), American major league baseball player
- Al Gerheauser (1917–1972), American major league baseball pitcher
- Al Gettel (1917–2005), American major league baseball pitcher
- Al Gionfriddo (1922–2003), American major league baseball player
- Al Glossop (1914–1991), American major league baseball player
- Al Gould (1893–1982), American major league baseball pitcher
- Al Grabowski (1901–1966), American major league baseball pitcher
- Al Greene (1954–2014), American major league baseball player
- Al Grunwald (1930–2011), American major league baseball pitcher
- Al Hall (died 1885), American major league baseball player
- Al Halt (1890–1973), American major league baseball player
- Al Harazin, American major league baseball general manager
- Al Heist (1927–2006), American major league baseball player, coach, and scout
- Al Hermann (1899–1980), American major league baseball player
- Al Holland (born 1952), American major league baseball player
- Al Hollingsworth (1908–1996), American major league baseball pitcher
- Al Hrabosky (born 1949), American major league baseball pitcher
- Al Hubbard (1860–1930), American major league baseball player
- Al Huenke (1891–1974), American major league baseball pitcher
- Al Humphrey (1886–1961), American major league baseball player
- Al Jackson (1935–2019), American major league baseball pitcher
- Al Javery (1918–1977), American major league baseball pitcher
- Al Javier (born 1954), Dominican major league baseball player
- Al Johnson (1860–1901), American baseball executive
- Al Johnson, American major league baseball pitcher
- Al Jones (born 1959), American major league baseball pitcher in the 1980s
- Al Jones, American major league baseball pitcher in the 1940s
- Al Jurisich (1921–1981), American major league baseball pitcher
- Al Kaiser (1886–1969), American major league baseball player
- Al Kaline (1934–2020), American major league baseball player
- Al Kellett (1901–1960), American major league baseball pitcher
- Al Kellogg (1886–1953), American major league baseball pitcher
- Al Kenders (1937–2013), American major league baseball pitcher
- Al Klawitter (1889–1950), American major league baseball pitcher
- Al Kozar (1921–2007), American major league baseball player
- Al Krumm (1865–1937), American major league baseball pitcher
- Al Kvasnak (1921–2002), American major league baseball player
- Al LaMacchia (1921–2010), American major league baseball pitcher and scout
- Al Lachowicz (born 1960), American major league baseball pitcher
- Al Lakeman (1918–1976), American major league baseball player
- Al Lary (1928–2001), American major league baseball pitcher
- Al Lefevre (1898–1982), American major league baseball player
- Al Leiter (born 1965), American major league baseball pitcher and sports commentator
- Al Levine (born 1968), American major league baseball pitcher
- Al Libke (1918–2003), American major league baseball player
- Al López (1908–2005), Spanish-American major league baseball player and manager
- Al Lukens (born 1868, date of death unknown), American major league baseball pitcher
- Al Luplow (1939–2017), American major league baseball player
- Al Lyons (1918–1965), American major league baseball player
- Al Mahon (1909–1977), American major league baseball pitcher
- Al Mamaux (1894–1962), American major league baseball player and manager
- Al Mannassau (1866–1933), American major league baseball player, umpire, and manager
- Al Martin (1847–1915), American major league baseball player
- Al Martin (born 1967), American major league baseball player
- Al Mattern (1883–1958), American major league baseball pitcher
- Al Maul (1865–1958), American major league baseball pitcher and player
- Al Mays (1865–1905), American major league baseball pitcher
- Al McBean (1938–2024), American major league baseball pitcher
- Al McCauley (1863–1917), American major league baseball pitcher and player
- Al McCoy (1928–2006), American major league baseball player
- Al McLean (1912–1990), American major league baseball pitcher
- Al Milnar (1913–2005), American major league baseball pitcher
- Al Monchak (1917–2015), American major league baseball player
- Al Montgomery (1920–1942), American major league baseball player
- Al Montreuil (1943–2008), American major league baseball player
- Al Moore (1902–1974), American major league baseball player
- Al Moran (born 1938), American major league baseball player
- Al Morris, American major league baseball player
- Al Myers (1863–1927), American major league baseball player
- Al Naples (1926–2021), American major league baseball player
- Al Neiger (1939–2022), American major league baseball pitcher
- Al Newman (born 1960), American major league baseball player
- Al Nichols (1852–1936), English major league baseball player
- Al Niehaus (1899–1931), American major league baseball player
- Al Niemiec (1911–1995), American major league baseball player
- Al Nipper (born 1959), American major league baseball pitcher and coach
- Al Nixon (1886–1960), American major league baseball player
- Al Ogletree (1930–2019), American college baseball coach
- Al Oliver (born 1946), American major league baseball player
- Al Olmsted (born 1957), American major league baseball pitcher
- Al Orth (1872–1948), American major league baseball pitcher
- Al Osuna (born 1965), American major league baseball pitcher
- Al Papai (1917–1995), American major league baseball pitcher
- Al Pardo (born 1962), Spanish major league baseball player
- Al Pedrique (born 1960), Venezuelan major league baseball player, coach, and manager
- Al Piechota (1914–1996), American major league baseball pitcher
- Al Pilarcik (1930–2010), American major league baseball player
- Al Pinkston (1917–1981), American major league baseball player
- Al Platte (1890–1976), American major league baseball player
- Al Porto (1926–2005), American major league baseball pitcher
- Al Pratt (1847–1937), American major league baseball pitcher
- Al Preston (1926–1979), American major league baseball pitcher
- Al Raffo (born 1941), American major league baseball pitcher
- Al Reach (1840–1928), Anglo-American major league baseball player, executive, publisher, spokesman, and businessman
- Al Reavis (1893–1950), American major league baseball pitcher
- Al Reiss (1909–1989), American major league baseball player
- Al Reyes (born 1970), American major league baseball pitcher
- Al Richter (1927–2017), American major league baseball player
- Al Robinson (died 1912), American major league baseball player
- Al Rosen (1924–2015), American major league baseball player
- Al Rubeling (1913–1988), American major league baseball player
- Al Salerno (1931–2007), American major league baseball umpire
- Al Santorini (born 1948), American major league baseball pitcher
- Al Sauter (1868–1928), American major league baseball player
- Al Schacht (1892–1984), American major league baseball pitcher, coach, and restaurateur
- Al Scheer (1888–1959), American major league baseball player
- Al Schellhase (1864–1919), American major league baseball player
- Al Schmelz (born 1943), American major league baseball pitcher
- Al Schroll (1932–1999), American major league baseball pitcher
- Al Schulz (1889–1931), American major league baseball pitcher
- Al Schweitzer (1882–1969), American major league baseball player
- Al Severinsen (1944–2015), American major league baseball pitcher
- Al Shaw (1873–1958), English major league baseball player
- Al Shaw (1881–1974), American major league baseball player
- Al Shealy (1900–1967), American major league baseball player
- Al Silvera (1935–2002), American major league baseball player
- Al Sima (1921–1993), American major league baseball pitcher
- Al Simmons (1902–1956), American major league baseball pitcher
- Al Skinner (1856–1901), American major league baseball player
- Al Smith (1903–1995), American major league baseball pitcher
- Al Smith (1907–1977), American major league baseball pitcher
- Al Smith (1925–2006), American major league baseball umpire
- Al Smith (1928–2002), American major league baseball player
- Al Somers (1905–1997), American baseball empire
- Al Spangler (born 1933), American major league baseball player and coach
- Al Spohrer (1902–1972), American major league baseball player
- Al Stanek (1943–2018), American major league baseball pitcher
- Al Stokes (1900–1986), American major league baseball player
- Al Strueve (1860–1929), American major league baseball player
- Al Tate (1918–1993), American major league baseball player
- Al Tedrow (1891–1958), American major league baseball pitcher
- Al Tesch (1891–1947), American major league baseball player
- Al Thake (1849–1872), English major league baseball player
- Al Todd (1902–1985), American major league baseball player
- Al Unser (1912–1995), American major league baseball player
- Al Van Camp (1903–1981), American major league baseball player
- Al Veach (1909–1990), American major league baseball pitcher
- Al Veigel (1917–2012), American major league baseball pitcher
- Al Verdel (1921–1991), American major league baseball pitcher
- Al Vincent (1906–2000), American major league baseball player, coach, manager, and scout
- Al Weis (born 1938), American major league baseball player
- Al Weston (1905–1997), American major league baseball player
- Al Wickland (1888–1980), American major league baseball player
- Al Widmar (1925–2005), American major league baseball pitcher
- Al Williams (1914–1969), American major league baseball pitcher
- Al Williamson (1900–1978), American major league baseball pitcher
- Al Wingo (1898–1964), American major league baseball player
- Al Worthington (born 1929), American major league baseball pitcher
- Al Wright (1842–1905), American major league baseball manager
- Al Wright (1912–1998), American major league baseball player
- Al Yates (1945–2007), American major league baseball player
- Al Yeargin (1901–1937), American major league baseball pitcher
- Al Zarilla (1919–1996), American major league baseball player

=== Basketball ===
- Al Alvarez (1912–1995), Argentine basketball player
- Al Attles (1936–2024), American basketball player and coach
- Al Barbre (born 1942), American basketball coach
- Al Beard (born 1942), American basketball player
- Al Benson (born 1914, date of death unknown), American basketball player
- Al Bianchi (1932–2019), American basketball player, coach, general manager, consultant, and scout
- Al Bonniwell (1911–2002), American basketball player
- Al Brightman (1923–1992), American basketball player and coach
- Al Bunge (1937–2019), American basketball player
- Al Butler (1938–2000), American basketball player
- Al Carlson (born 1951), American basketball player
- Al Cervi (1917–2009), American basketball player and coach
- Al Cueto (born 1946), Cuban basketball player
- Al Dillard, American college basketball player
- Al Durham (born 1998), American basketball player
- Al Eberhard (born 1952), American basketball player
- Al Ferrari (1933–2016), American basketball player
- Al Fisher (born 1986), American basketball player
- Al Fleming (1954–2003), American basketball player
- Al Green (born 1953), American-Australian basketball player and coach
- Al Grenert (1919–2002), American basketball player and coach
- Al Guokas (1925–1990), American basketball player
- Al Hairston (born 1945), American basketball player and coach
- Al Harrington (born 1980), American basketball player
- Al Henry (born 1949), American basketball player
- Al Horford (born 1986), Dominican basketball player
- Al Jackson (born 1943), American basketball player
- Al Jefferson (born 1985), American basketball player
- Al Johnson (1913–1991), American basketball player
- Al Leslie (born 1960), American basketball player and coach
- Al Lucas (1922–1995), American basketball player
- Al Lujack (1920–2002), American basketball player
- Al Masino (1928–2006), American basketball player
- Al McClellan (1898/1899–1962), American college basketball coach
- Al McGuire (1928–2001), American college basketball coach and broadcaster
- Al Miksis (1928–2012), American basketball player
- Al Moschetti (1920–2007), American basketball player
- Al Negratti (1921–1998), American basketball player, coach, and college athletics administrator
- Al Peterson (c. 1906–1900s), American basketball player
- Al Pinkins (born 1972), American basketball coach
- Al Price (1917–2011), American basketball player
- Al Roges (1930–2009), American basketball player
- Al Salvadori (born 1945), American basketball player
- Al Sanders (1950–1994), American basketball player
- Al Schrecker (1917–2000), American basketball player
- Al Seiden (1937–2008), American basketball player
- Al Skinner (born 1952), American basketball player and college basketball coach
- Al Smith (1947–2022), American basketball player
- Al Solis (born 1962), Filipino basketball player
- Al Stewart (born 1983), American basketball player
- Al Szolack (born 1950), American basketball player
- Al Thornton (born 1983), American basketball player
- Al Tucker (1943–2001), American basketball player
- Al Vergara (born 1979), Filipino basketball player
- Al Walker (born 1959), American basketball player, coach, and scout
- Al Westover (born 1954), American basketball coach
- Al Williams (1948–2007), American basketball player
- Al Wood (born 1958), American basketball player

=== Boxing ===
- Al Asuncion (1929–2006), Filipino flyweight boxer
- Al Bourke (born 1928), Australian middleweight boxer
- Al Cole (born 1964), American heavyweight boxer
- Al Davis (1920–1945), American lightweight boxer
- Al Ford (born 1950), Canadian lightweight boxer
- Al Foreman (1904–1954), British-Canadian lightweight boxer
- Al Haymon (born 1955), American boxing promoter
- Al Hostak (1916–2006), American middleweight boxer
- Al Kaufman (1886–1957), American heavyweight boxer and film actor
- Al Korovou (born c. 1947), Fijian middleweight boxer
- Al McCoy (Alexander Rudolph; 1894–1966), American world champion middleweight boxer
- Al Mello (1906–1993), American middleweight boxer
- Al Palzer (1890–1917), American heavyweight boxer
- Al Phillips (1920–1999), English featherweight and lightweight boxer
- Al Robinson (1947–1974), American featherweight boxer
- Al Romero (1911–1985), Mexican-American welterweight boxer
- Al Seeger (born 1980), American Super-bantamweight boxer
- Al Silvani (1910–1996), American boxing trainer and actor
- Al Singer ("The Bronx Beauty"; 1909–1961), American world champion lightweight boxer
- Al Sund (1902–1951), American bantamweight boxer
- Al Weill (1893–1969), French-American boxing manager

=== Gridiron football ===
- Al Ackland (born c. 1940), Canadian football player
- Al Afalava (born 1987), American football player
- Al Akins (1921–1995), American football player
- Al Anderson (c. 1914–1994), Canadian football administrator and general manager
- Al Andrews (born 1945), American football player
- Al Arndt (1911–1969), American football player
- Al Atkinson (born 1943), American football player
- Al Babartsky (1915–2002), American football player
- Al Baggett (1903–1976), American college football and basketball coach
- Al Bagnoli (born 1953), American football player and coach
- Al Baisi (1971–2005), American football player
- Al Baker (born 1956), American football player
- Al Baldwin (1923–1994), American football player
- Al Bansavage (1938–2003), American football player
- Al Barnes (halfback), American college football player
- Al Barry (1930–2022), American football player
- Al Beauchamp (born 1944), American football player
- Al Bedner (1898–1988), American football player
- Al Bemiller (1938–2022), American football player
- Al Benecick (1937–2015), Canadian football player
- Al Bentzin (1902–1979), American football player
- Al Blades (1977–2003), American football player
- Al Blades Jr. (born 1999), American football player
- Al Blatnik (1923–2011), American college football and basketball coach
- Al Blevins (1922–1988), American college football and basketball coach
- Al Bloodgood (1901–1947), American football player
- Al Bloomingdale (born 1953), American Canadian football player
- Al Blozis (1919–1945), American football player and track and field athlete
- Al Bodine (1927–2020), American Canadian football player
- Al Borges (born 1955), American football coach
- Al Brenner (1947–2012), American Canadian football player
- Al Brosky (1928–2010), American football player
- Al Bruno (1927–2014), American football player, administrator, and coach
- Al Bryant (1930–2021), Canadian football player
- Al Burleson (born 1954), American Canadian football player
- Al Campana (1926–2009), American football player
- Al Caniglia (1921–1974), American college football coach
- Al Cannava (1924–2017), American football player
- Al Carapella (1927–2020), American and Canadian football player
- Al Carmichael (1928–2019), American football player
- Al Catanho (born 1972), American football player
- Al Chamblee (born 1968), American football player
- Al Chandler (born 1950), American football player
- Al Charuk (born 1954), Canadian football player
- Al Chesley (born 1957), American football player
- Al Clark (1948–2004), American football player
- Al Clemens (1898–1993), American football, basketball, and baseball player, coach, and college athletics administrator
- Al Coleman (born 1944), American football player
- Al Conover (born 1938), American football player and coach
- Al Conway (1930–2012), American football player and referee
- Al Coppage (1916–1992), American football player
- Al Cornsweet (1906–1991), American football player and coach
- Al Couppee (1920–1998), American football player
- Al Cowlings (born 1947), American football player and actor
- Al Crook (1897–1958), American football player
- Al Crow (1932–2019), American football player
- Al Culver (1908–1982), American football player
- Al Darby (born 1954), American football player
- Al Davis (1929–2011), American football coach and executive
- Al Darby (born 1954), American football player
- Al Davis (1929–2011), American football coach and executive
- Al DeMao (1920–2008), American football player
- Al DeRogatis (1927–1995), American football player and sportscaster
- Al Dekdebrun (1921–2005), American football player and politician
- Al Del Greco (born 1962), American football kicker and radio personality
- Al Dennis (born 1951), American football player
- Al Denson (born 1942), American football player
- Al Dixon (born 1954), American football player
- Al Dodd (1945–1987), American football player
- Al Donelli (1917–2002), American football player
- Al Dorow (1929–2009), American football player and coach
- Al Ecuyer (1937–2012), American football player
- Al Edwards (born 1967), American football player
- Al Endress (1929–2023), American football player
- Al Ennis (1897–1958), American football executive and tennis player
- Al Fiorentino (1917–2001), American football player
- Al Frazier (1935–2018), American and Canadian football player
- Al Garten (1905–1981), American college football and basketball coach
- Al Gebert (1906–1980), American football player and coach
- Al Ghesquiere (1918–2012), American football player
- Al Golden (born 1969), American football player and coach
- Al Goldstein (1936–1991), American football player
- Al Graham (1905–1969), American football player
- Al Groh (born 1944), American football player, coach, and analyst
- Al Gross (born 1961), American football player
- Al Grygo (1918–1971), American football player
- Al Gursky (born 1940), American football player
- Al Gutknecht (1917–1996), American football player
- Al Hadden (1899–1969), American football player
- Al Harris (born 1956), American football player
- Al Harris (born 1974), American football player and coach
- Al Hessberg (1916–1995), American college football player and lawyer
- Al Hoisington (born 1933), American football player
- Al Holcomb (born 1970), American football coach
- Al Hoptowit (1915–1981), American football player and coach
- Al Humphreys (1902–1962), American college football coach and athletics administrator
- Al Hunter (born 1955), American football player
- Al Irwin (born 1943), Canadian football player
- Al Jacks (c. 1935—2023), American football coach
- Al Jamison (1937–2021), American football player
- Al Jenkins (born 1946), American football player
- Al Johnson (1922–2011), American football player, coach, and college athletics administrator
- Al Johnson (born 1979), American football player and coach
- Al Johnson, American football player
- Al Jolley (1899–1948), American football player and coach
- Al Jury, American football official
- Al Kaporch (1913–2004), American football player
- Al Kincaid (born 1947), American football player and coach
- Al Kircher (1909–2004), American football, basketball, and baseball player and coach
- Al Klug (1920–1957), American football player
- Al Kreuz (1898–1975), American football player
- Al Krevis (born 1952), American football player
- Al Krueger (1919–1999), American football player
- Al Latimer (born 1957), American football player
- Al Lavan (1946–2018), American football player and coach
- Al Leonzi (died 2014), American college football coach
- Al Lerner (1933–2002), American football executive and businessman
- Al Lindow (1919–1989), American football player
- Al Loeb (1890–1987), American college football player
- Al Logan, American college football coach
- Al Lolotai (1920–1990), Samoan-American American football player
- Al Louis-Jean (born 1993), American football player
- Al Lucas (1978–2005), American football player
- Al Luginbill (born 1946), American football coach
- Al Maeder (1906–1984), American football player
- Al Maginnes (1897–1966), American football player
- Al Mahrt (1893–1970), American football player and coach
- Al Marcelin (born 1945), American Canadian football player
- Al Matthews (1947–2025), American football player
- Al Matuza (1918–2004), American football player
- Al McGall (c. 1889—1941), American football and track and field coach
- Al Michaels (1900–1972), American football player
- Al Michaels (1911–1991), American football player, coach, and college athletics administrator
- Al Milch (1919–2010), American college football coach
- Al Mitchell (1897–1967), American football player
- Al Molde (born 1943), American college football coach and college athletics administrator
- Al Moore (1908–1991), American football player
- Al Nelson (born 1943), American football player
- Al Nesser (1893–1967), American football player
- Al Nichelini (1909–1992), American football player
- Al Noga (born 1965), American football player
- Al Norgard (1907–1975), American football player
- Al Onofrio (1921–2004), American college football player and coach
- Al Palewicz (born 1950), American football player
- Al Paone (born c. 1942), American college football player, coach, baseball coach, and wrestling coach
- Al Passman (1923–1984), Canadian football player
- Al Paul (c. 1926–2014), American college athlete, football and lacrosse coach, and college athletics administrator
- Al Phaneuf (born 1944), Canadian football player
- Al Piasecky (1917–1992), American football player
- Al Pierotti (1895–1964), American football player, major league baseball pitcher, and football coach
- Al Pollard (1928–2002), American football player
- Al Randolph (born 1944), American football player
- Al Rankin (born c. 1947), Canadian football player
- Al Reynolds (1938–2019), American football player
- Al Richardson (1935–1977), American football player
- Al Richardson (born 1957), American football player
- Al Ritchie (1890–1966), Canadian football player, coach, and administrator
- Al Roberts (born 1944), American football coach
- Al Romano (born 1953), American Canadian football player
- Al Romine (1930–2015), American Canadian and American football player
- Al Rose (1905–1985), American football player
- Al Russas (1923–1995), American football player
- Al Sarafiny (1906–1981), American football player and coach
- Al Satterfield (1921–1989), American football player
- Al Saunders (born 1947), American football coach
- Al Seagraves (born 1953), American football coach
- Al Shook (1899–1984), American football player
- Al Sidorik (1919–1980), American football player
- Al Simpson (1916–1976), American football coach
- Al Smith (born 1964), American football player
- Al Sparlis (1920–2005), American football player
- Al Steinfeld (born 1958), American football player
- Al Stevenson (1921–1958), Canadian football player
- Al Toon (born 1963), American football player
- Al Valdes (1935–2025), Canadian football player
- Al Vanderbush (1907–2005), American college football coach and college athletics administrator
- Al Vandeweghe (1920–2014), American football player
- Al Wallace (born 1974), American football player
- Al Ward (1927–2021), American football executive
- Al Washington (born 1958), American football player
- Al Washington (born 1984), American college football player and coach
- Al Weisbecker (1931–2017), American college football player and coach
- Al Wenglikowski (born 1960), American football player
- Al Wesbecher (1892–1966), American football player
- Al Wiley (c. 1928–1998), Canadian football player
- Al Williams (born 1961), American football player
- Al Wilson (born 1950), Canadian football player
- Al Wilson (born 1977), American football player
- Al Wistert (1920–2016), American football player
- Al Witcher (born 1936), American football player
- Al Wolden (born 1965), American football player
- Al Woodall (born 1945), American football player
- Al Woods (born 1987), American football player
- Al Worley (1946–2020), American football player and coach
- Al Wukits (1917–1978), American football player
- Al Young (born 1949), American football player
- Al Zupek (1922–1980), American football player

=== Ice hockey ===
- Al Arbour (1932–2015), Canadian ice hockey player, coach, and executive
- Al Blanchard (born 1952), Canadian ice hockey player
- Al Buchanan (1927–1994), Canadian ice hockey player
- Al Cameron (born 1955), Canadian ice hockey player
- Al Coates (born 1945), Canadian ice hockey executive and general manager
- Al Conroy (born 1966), Canadian ice hockey player
- Al Dewsbury (1926–2006), Canadian ice hockey player
- Al Hamilton (born 1946), Canadian ice hockey player
- Al Hill (born 1955), Canadian ice hockey player
- Al Huggins (1909–1991), Canadian ice hockey player
- Al Iafrate (born 1966), American ice hockey player
- Al Jensen (born 1958), Canadian ice hockey goaltender
- Al Johnson (1935–2019), Canadian ice hockey player
- Al Karlander (born 1946), Canadian ice hockey player
- Al Langlois (1934–2020), Canadian ice hockey player
- Al Leader (1903–1982), Canadian-American ice hockey player, referee, and administrator
- Al LeBrun (born 1940), Canadian ice hockey player
- Al MacAdam (born 1952), Canadian ice hockey player
- Al MacInnis (born 1963), Canadian ice hockey player
- Al MacIsaac (born 1967), Canadian ice hockey player and executive
- Al MacNeil (1935–2025), Canadian ice hockey player and coach
- Al McDonough (born 1950), Canadian ice hockey player
- Al McLean (born 1939), Canadian ice hockey player
- Al McLeod (born 1949), Canadian ice hockey player
- Al Millar (1929–1987), Canadian ice hockey goaltender
- Al Montoya (born 1985), American ice hockey goaltender
- Al Murray (1906–1982), Canadian ice hockey player
- Al Nicholson (1936–1978), Canadian ice hockey player
- Al Osborne (born 1947), Canadian ice hockey player
- Al Picard (1923–2019), Canadian ice hockey player
- Al Pickard (1895–1975), Canadian ice hockey administrator
- Al Pluymers (born 1957), Dutch-Canadian ice hockey player
- Al Purvis (1929–2009), Canadian ice hockey player
- Al Renfrew (1924–2014), Canadian college ice hockey player and coach
- Al Rittinger (1925–2017), Canadian ice hockey player
- Al Rollins (1926–1996), Canadian ice hockey goaltender
- Al Rycroft (born 1950), Canadian ice hockey player
- Al Secord (born 1958), Canadian ice hockey player
- Al Simmons (1951–2024), Canadian ice hockey player
- Al Sims (born 1953), Canadian ice hockey player and coach
- Al Smith (1945–2002), Canadian ice hockey goaltender
- Al Sobotka (born 1953) American building operator of Little Caesars Arena
- Al Staley (1928–2019), Canadian ice hockey player
- Al Suomi (1913–2014), American ice hockey player
- Al Tuer (born 1963), Canadian ice hockey player and scout

=== Other sports ===
- Al Ain (born 2014), Japanese Thoroughbred racehorse
- Al Dokali Al Seyed (born 1993), Libyan footballer
- Al Faisal Al Zubair (born 1998), Omani racing driver
- Al Albert (born 1949), American college soccer coach
- Al Aspen (1893–1956), American racing driver
- Al Bahathri (1982–2014), British Thoroughbred racehorse
- Al Balding (1924–2006), Canadian professional golfer
- Al Bangura (born 1988), Sierra Leonean footballer
- Al Bashid Muhammed (born 1998), Indian cricketer
- Al Bates (1905–1999), American long jumper
- Al Baxter (born 1977), Australian rugby union footballer
- Al Besselink (1923–2017), American professional golfer
- Al Bouchie, Canadian darts player
- Al Boum Photo (born 2012), Irish racehorse
- Al Broadhurst (1927–2014), American speed skater
- Al Brosch (1911–1975), American professional golfer
- Al Buehler, American college track and cross-country coach
- Al Cantello (1931–2024), American javelin thrower and coach
- Al Caravelli (born 1959/1960), American rugby coach
- Al Charron (born 1966), Canadian rugby union player
- Al Costello (1919–2000), Italian-Australian professional wrestler
- Al Cotey (1888–1974), American racing driver
- Al Dunning (born 1950), American horse trainer
- Al Eile (born 2000), Irish Thoroughbred racehorse
- Al Espinosa (1891–1957), American professional golfer
- Al Fasyimi (born 1998), Indonesian footballer
- Al Fenn, American boxing promoter and trainer
- Al Ferof (born 2005), British Thoroughbred racehorse
- Al Feuerbach (born 1948), American track and field athlete
- Al Finucane (born 1943), Irish footballer
- Al Fiskar (1928–2013), Canadian curler and coach
- Al Fitch (1912–1981), American relay runner
- Al Fong (born c. 1953), American gymnastics coach and gymnastics club owner
- Al Francesco (1933–2024), American blackjack player and gambling strategist
- Al Gagne (1941–2020), American curler
- Al Geiberger (born 1937), American professional golfer
- Al Gordon (1902–1936), American racing driver
- Al Green (1955–2013), American professional wrestler
- Al Greene (born 1978), Gibraltarian footballer
- Al Hackner (born 1954), Canadian curler
- Al Haft (1886–1976), American professional wrestler, wrestling and boxing promoter, and trainer
- Al Hareb (1986–after 2002), British Thoroughbred racehorse and sire
- Al Harker (1910–2006), American soccer player
- Al Heagy (1906–1990), American lacrosse player, coach, chemist, educator, and politician
- Al Hedman (born 1953), Jamaican-English darts player
- Al Henderson (born 1950), Trinidad soccer player
- Al Herman (1926–1960), American racing driver
- Al Hobman (1925–2008), New Zealand professional wrestler, trainer, and promoter
- Al Hofmann (1947–2008), American drag racing driver
- Al Holbert (1946–1988), American racing driver
- Al Howie (1945–2016), Canadian long-distance runner
- Al Iaquinta (born 1987), American mixed martial artist
- Al Jochim (1902–1980), American gymnast
- Al Johnston (born 1932), Scottish-Canadian professional golfer
- Al Joyner (born 1960), American track and field athlete and coach
- Al Kanaar (born 1983), Australian rugby union footballer
- Al Katrazz (born 1971), American professional wrestler
- Al Kazeem (born 2008), British Thoroughbred racehorse
- Al Keller (1920–1961), American racing driver
- Al Kelley (1935–2017), American professional golfer
- Al Krux, American poker player
- Al Langlois (1915–2005), Canadian curler
- Al Lawrence (1930–2017), Australian long-distance runner
- Al Lawrence (born 1947), American chess expert and author
- Al Lawrence (born 1961), Jamaican track and field sprinter
- Al LeConey (1901–1959), American track and field runner
- Al Loquasto (1940–1991), Italian-American racing driver
- Al Madril (born 1950), American professional wrestler
- Al Manning (born 1982), Australian rugby union player
- Al Mantello (1934–2021), Italian-Australian rules footballer
- Al Melcher (1884–1944), American racing driver
- Al Mengert (1929–2021), American professional golfer
- Al Miller (1907–1967), American racing driver
- Al Miller (1921–1978), American racing driver
- Al Miller (born 1936), American soccer coach
- Al Bandari Mobarak (born 2001), Saudi Arabian footballer
- Al Nasr (1978–2003), French Thoroughbred racehorse and sire
- Al Seyni Ndiaye (born 1989), Senegalese beach soccer goalkeeper
- Al Njie (born 1955), American soccer player
- Al Oeming (1925–2014), Canadian professional wrestler, promoter, wildlife conservationist, and zoologist
- Al Oerter (1936–2007), American discus thrower
- Al Naem Mohamed Osman Al Noor (born 1990), Sudanese footballer
- Al Parker (born 1968), American tennis player
- Al Pease (1921–2014), British-Canadian racing driver
- Al Pereira (1906–1990), American professional wrestler
- Al Perez (born 1960), American professional wrestler
- Al Pilcher (born 1969), Canadian cross-country skier
- Al Putnam (1908–1946), American racing driver
- Al Mustafa Riyadh (born 1975), Bahraini marathon runner
- Al Rogers (1909–1984), American racing driver
- Al Rossi (born 1931), American rower
- Al Sahariar (born 1978), Bangladeshi cricketer
- Al Hassan Saleh (born 1991), Emirati footballer
- Al Hussain Saleh (born 1991), Emirati footballer
- Al Scates (born 1939), American volleyball player and coach
- Al Schoterman (born 1950), American hammer thrower
- Al Sellinger (1914–1986), American cyclist
- Al Shelhamer (1918–1986), American Thoroughbred horse racing jockey
- Al Slater, Canadian Paralympic powerlifter
- Al Smith (1929–1985), American racing driver
- Al Smith (born 1962), American soccer player
- Al Snow (born 1963), American professional wrestler
- Al Stiller (1923–2004), American cyclist
- Al Tasnady (1930–1988), American racing driver
- Al Tharnish (1869–1935), American runner
- Al Tomko (1931–2009), Canadian professional wrestler and wrestling promoter
- Al Hassan Toure (born 2000), Australian footballer
- Al Treloar (1873–1960), American bodybuilder, athletic trainer, author, and artist's model
- Al Trost (born 1949), American soccer player
- Al Troth (1930–2012), American fisherman
- Al Ulbrickson Sr. (1903–1980), American rower and coach
- Al Ulbrickson (1930–2012), American rower
- Al Unser Sr. (1939–2021), American racing driver
- Al Unser Jr. (born 1962), American racing driver
- Al Richard Unser (born 1982), American racing driver
- Al Vande Weghe (1916–2002), American swimmer
- Al Wadud, Bangladeshi cricketer
- Al Watrous (1899–1983), American professional golfer
- Al Williams, American professional wrestler
- Al Young (1946–2022), American drag racer
- Al Zerbarini (died 2012), American drag racer
- Al Zerhusen (1931–2018), American soccer player

== Politics ==
- Al Tayeb Abdul Rahim (1944–2020), Palestinian politician
- Al Adair (1929–1996), Canadian politician, radio broadcaster, and minor league baseball player
- Al Adinolfi (1934–2019), American congressman from Connecticut
- Al Alquist (1908–2006), American senator from California
- Al Angrisani (1949–2020), American business consultant and Assistant U.S. Secretary of Labor
- Al Anoud Al Fayez (born 1957), Jordanian noblewoman and Saudi royal
- Al Ater (1953–2017), American congressman from Louisiana
- Al Aynsley-Green (born 1943), English scientist and Children's Commissioner for England (2005–2009)
- Al Baldasaro (born 1956), American congressman from New Hampshire
- Al Bandari bint Abdul Rahman Al Saud (died 2019), Saudi royal princess
- Al Bandari bint Abdulaziz Al Saud (1928–2008), Saudi royal princess
- Al Bendich (1929–2015), American civil rights attorney and professor
- Al Benedict (c. 1929–2003), American politician from Pennsylvania
- Al Francis Bichara (born 1952), Filipino politician
- Al Bramlet (1917–1977), American labor union leader and businessman
- Al Burruss (1927–1986), American congressman from Georgia
- Al Cannon (born 1946), American law enforcement officer, attorney, and politician
- Al Capone (1899–1947), prominent Chicago gangster from the 1920s
- Al Cárdenas (born 1948), Cuban-American lawyer, politician, and conservative activist
- Al Carlson (born 1948), American congressman from North Dakota
- Al Checchi (born 1948), American businessman and politician
- Al D'Amato (born 1937), American senator from New York
- Al Davis (born 1952), American businessman and politician
- Al DeKruif (born 1956), American senator from Minnesota
- Al Doty (born 1945), American congressman from Minnesota
- Al Duerr (born 1951), Canadian politician, Mayor of Calgary (1989–2001)
- Al Edwards (1937–2020), American congressman from Texas
- Al Eisenberg (1946–2022), American congressman from Virginia
- Al Eisenstat (born 1930), American lawyer and business executive
- Al Falle (1943–2022), Canadian politician
- Al Franken (born 1951), American senator from Minnesota
- Al From (born 1943), American political strategist and businessman
- Al Gentry (born 1964), American senator from Kentucky
- Al Gerhardstein (born 1951), American civil rights attorney
- Al Ghorbanpoor, American civil engineer and professor
- Al Gillespie, American law professor
- Al Gore (born 1948), environmentalist, former US Senator and former Vice President of the United States
- Al Graf (born 1958), American attorney and District Court Judge from New York
- Al Grassby (1926–2005), Australian politician
- Al Green (born 1947), American lawyer and congressman from Texas
- Al Gross (born 1962), American senator from Alaska, orthopedic surgeon, and commercial fisherman
- Al Haris (born 1973), Indonesian politician and bureaucrat who has served as the governor of Jambi
- Al Hawkins, Canadian politician
- Al J. Hayes (1900–1981), American labor union leader
- Al B. Henry (1911–1989), American senator from Washington
- Al Hiebert (1938–2000), Canadian congressman from Alberta
- Al Hoang (born 1962), Vietnamese-American politician
- Al Hoffman Jr. (born 1934), American politician and businessman
- Al Hollingworth (1918–2005), Canadian lawyer, politician, and judge
- Al Horning (1939–2023), Canadian politician
- Al Hubbard (born 1936), American anti-war and civil rights activist
- Al Hutchinson, Irish Police Commissioner
- Al Indelicato (1931–1981), American mobster
- Al Jacquet, American lawyer and politician from Florida
- Al Jennings (1863–1961), American attorney and silent film actor
- Al R. Johanson (1899–1964), American lawyer and politician from Minnesota
- Al Johnson (born 1939), Canadian politician, geologist, and exploration manager
- Al Juhnke (born 1958), American congressman from Nebraska
- Al Noor Kassum (1924–2021), Tanzanian politician
- Al Kavanaugh, Canadian politician
- Al Kerth (1952–2002), American civic leader and public relations executive
- Al Koistinen (born 1948), American congressman from South Dakota
- Al Kolyn (1932–2024), Canadian politician
- Al Kramer (born 1948), American politician from Nevada
- Al Kurtenbach (born 1934), American senator from South Dakota and electrical engineer
- Al Lacey (born 1942), Canadian legislator from New Brunswick
- Al Lamberti (born 1954), American sheriff from Florida
- Al Landis (born 1954), American congressman from Ohio
- Al Lang (1870–1960), American politician and businessman, mayor of St. Petersburg, Florida (1916–1920)
- Al Lannon (1907–1969), Italian-American leader in the Communist Party USA and co-founder of the National Maritime Union
- Al Lawson (born 1948), American congressman from Florida and businessman
- Al Leach (1935–2024), Canadian politician from Ontario and transportation executive
- Al Libous (1928–2016), American politician, mayor of Binghamton, New York (1969–1981)
- Al Lipscomb (1925–2011), American civil rights activist and council member from Dallas, Texas
- Al Loehr (1927–2013), American politician, mayor of St. Cloud, Minnesota (1971–1980)
- Al MacBain (1925–2003), Canadian lawyer and politician from Nova Scotia
- Al Mackling (born 1927), Canadian lawyer and politician from Manitoba
- Al Matsalla (1926–2015), Canadian educator, municipal administrator, and political figure
- Al McAffrey (born 1948), American senator from Oklahoma
- Al McCandless (1927–2017), American businessman, military veteran, and congressman from California
- Al McDonald, Canadian politician, mayor of North Bay, Ontario (2010–2022)
- Al McLean (politician) (1937–2024), Canadian politician
- Al Meiklejohn (1923–2010), American senator from Colorado
- Al Meinzinger, Canadian Royal Canadian Air Force officer
- Al Melvin (born 1944), American senator from Arizona
- Al Meyerhoff (1947–2008), American labor, environmental, and civil rights attorney
- Al Mosher (born 1948), Canadian politician
- Al Muratsuchi (born 1964), American politician from California
- Al Novstrup (born 1954), American businessman and congressman from South Dakota
- Al Overfield, Canadian white supremacist
- Al Palladini (1943–2001), Canadian politician from Ontario
- Al W. Patton (born 1937), American congressman from Minnesota
- Al Park (born 1970), American attorney, lobbyist, and congressman from New Mexico
- Al Passarell (1950–1986), Canadian politician from British Columbia
- Al Pearlman, American politician from Pennsylvania
- Al Pscholka (born 1960), American congressman from Michigan
- Al Quie (1923–2023), American congressman and senator from Minnesota, farmer, and Governor of Minnesota (1979–1983)
- Al Riley (born 1953), American congressman from Illinois
- Al Rooney (1892–?), American gang leader
- Al Runte (born 1947), American politician, environmental historian, and college educator
- Al Salvi (born 1960), American attorney, politician, and radio talk show host
- Al Schmidt (born c. 1972), American politician and election official
- Al Sharpton (born 1954), American civil rights activist, Baptist minister, talk show host and politician
- Al Smith (1873–1944), American politician, Governor of New York (1923–1928)
- Al Stewart (born 1955), American politician
- Al Sturgeon (born 1956), American lawyer, senator, and congressman from Iowa
- Al Sutton (1933–2022), American human rights activist
- Al Swift (1935–2018), American congressman from Washington and broadcaster
- Al Taubenberger (born 1953), American politician and businessman
- Al Taylor (born 1957), American politician from New York
- Al Terrill (1937–2008), American senator from Oklahoma
- Al Tornabene (1923–2009), American mobster
- Al Ullman (1914–1986), American congressman from Oregon
- Al Veys (1919–2002), American politician, Mayor of Omaha, Nebraska (1977–1981)
- Al Waleed bin Talal Al Saud (born 1955), Saudi Arabian businessman, investor, philanthropist, and royal
- Al Walid ben Zidan (died 1636), Sultan of Morocco (1631–1636)
- Al White (born 1950), American senator from Colorado
- Al W. Wieser Jr. (born 1949), American politician and businessman
- Al Williams (born 1947), American congressman from Georgia
- Al Young (born 1942), American congressman from Oregon
- Al Zariwny (born 1944), Canadian politician from Alberta

== Other ==
- Al Bernardin (1928–2009), American restaurateur and businessman
- Al Brady (1910–1937), American bank robber and murderer
- Al Clark (1965–2015), American businessman
- Al Copeland (1944–2008), American entrepreneur and restaurateur, founder of Popeyes
- Al DiGuido (born 1956), American businessman
- Al Fritz (1924–2013), American businessman
- Al Gross (1918–2000), Canadian-American engineer and inventor
- Al Hake (1916–1944), Australian WWII pilot
- Al Hayman (1847–1917), American businessman
- Al Haynes (1931–2019), American airline pilot and public speaker
- Al Herpin (1862–1947), American who was known as the "Man Who Never Slept"
- Al Hoagland (1926–2022), American computer engineer
- Al Melling, British automobile engineer
- Al Meyers (1908–1976), American pioneer aviator
- Al Mooney (1906–1986), American aircraft designer and early aviation entrepreneur
- Al Mtenje (born 1953), Malawian academic
- Al Panlilio, Filipino businessman
- Al Parish (born 1950s), American economist and fraudster
- Al Savill (1917–1989), English mortgage banker, real estate developer, and hotel owner
- Al Schmid (1920–1982), American U.S. Marine soldier
- Al Schneider (1907–1983), American businessman
- Al Schwimmer (1917–2011), American engineer and businessman
- Al Shelton (1920–2016), American leatherworker
- Al Sieber (1843–1907), German-American prospector
- Al Stewart (born 1959), Australian bishop
- Al Stubblefield, American businessman
- Al Tomaini (1912–1962), American man who was once the world's tallest man
- Al Ulmer (1916–2000), American intelligence officer
- Al Vezza, American computer science professor and businessman
- Al Weiss (born 1954), American businessman
- Al Whittaker (1918–2006), American businessman
- Al Zampa (1905–2000), American iron worker

== Fictional characters ==
- Al Bundy, a character in the television series Married... with Children
- Al Delvecchio, a character in the television series Happy Days
- Al Dillon, a character in the 1987 film Predator
- Alfred "Al" Emmo, titular character of the video game Al Emmo and the Lost Dutchman's Mine
- Big Gay Al, a character from South Park
- Al Giardello, a character on the television drama Homicide: Life on the Street
- Al Haskey, a character in the British soap opera Doctors
- Al Jenkins, a character in the British soap opera EastEnders
- Al MacKenzie, a character featured in multiple comics published by Marvel Comics
- Al McWhiggin, a character and antagonist in the 1999 Disney/Pixar animated film Toy Story 2
- Al Neri, a character featured in The Godfather movie trilogy and book
- Al Powell, a police Sergeant from Die Hard
- Al Pratt, first identity of the DC Comics hero Atom
- Al Simmons, human identity of Image Comics antihero Spawn
