= Stubblefield, Texas =

Stubblefield, Texas may refer to the following places:

- Stubblefield, Houston County, Texas
- Stubblefield, Johnson County, Texas

== See also ==
- Stubblefield (disambiguation)
