= Kerth =

Kerth is a surname. Notable people with the surname include:

- Al Kerth (1952–2002), St. Louis civic leader and public relations executive
- Anna Kerth (born 1980), Polish actress
- Werner Kerth (born 1966), Austrian ice hockey player
