= Stubblefield =

Stubblefield may refer to:

== Places ==
- Stubblefield, Illinois, an unincorporated community in Bond County, Illinois, United States
- Stubblefield, Texas, a location in Houston County, Texas, United States

== People with the surname ==
- Al Stubblefield, American president and CEO of Baptist Health Care
- Anna Stubblefield (born 1969), American former philosophy professor and convicted sexual assaulter
- Blaine Stubblefield (1896–1960), American archivist of folk songs
- Catherine Stubblefield Wilson (born 1939), American child pornography distributor
- Christopher B. "Stubb" Stubblefield (1931–1995), American barbecue restaurateur
- Clyde Stubblefield (1943–2017), American drummer
- Cyril James Stubblefield (1901–1999), British geologist
- Dana Stubblefield (born 1970), American football player
- Frank Stubblefield (1907–1977), American politician
- Gary Stubblefield (1951–2025), American politician
- Ike Stubblefield (1952–2021), American musician
- John Stubblefield (1945–2005), American jazz saxophonist, flautist, and oboist
- Mickey Stubblefield (1926–2013), Negro league baseball player
- Nathan Stubblefield (1860–1928), American inventor and farmer
- Peter Stubblefield (1888–1966), American politician and Mississippi state senator
- Phoebe Stubblefield, American forensic anthropologist
- Seth Stubblefield (born 1993), American swimmer
- Simeon Stubblefield (born 1959), Liberian boxer
- Stubby Stubblefield (1909–1935), American racecar driver
- Taylor Stubblefield (born 1982), former American football player
- Tony Stubblefield (born 1970), American college assistant basketball coach
- William L. Stubblefield (born 1940), American rear admiral

== Fictional character ==
- Edward "Stubbs" Stubblefield, the eponymous main character of the 2006 video game Stubbs the Zombie in Rebel Without a Pulse
