= Al Jackson (disambiguation) =

Al Jackson (1935–2019) was an American baseball player

Al Jackson may also refer to:

- Al Jackson (basketball) (born 1943), American basketball player
- Al Jackson Jr. (1935–1975), drummer, producer, and songwriter
- Al Jackson (artist) (born 1964), American artist and painter
- Al Jackson (American football) (born 1971), American football player
- Alcender Jackson (born 1977), American football player
- Alvin B. Jackson, American politician

== See also ==
- Alan Jackson (disambiguation)
