= Albert Hart =

Albert Hart may refer to:

- Albert Bushnell Hart (1854–1943), American historian, writer, and teacher
- Al Hart (actor), actor in The Phantom Fortune etc., often credited as Albert Hall
- Albert Hart (politician), Secretary of State of California
- Albert Frederick Hart, Canadian diplomat and ambassador
- Albert Gailord Hart (1909–1997), American economist and monetary-policy expert

== See also ==
- Al Hart, radio personality
