= Eisenstat =

Eisenstat is a surname. Notable people with the surname include:

- Al Eisenstat (born 1930), American lawyer and business executive
- Harry Eisenstat (1915–2003), American baseball player
- Yael Eisenstat, American national security specialist and strategist

== See also ==
- Eisenstadt
