= The Manhattan Transfer Live =

Live

Live album by The Manhattan Transfer
- Released: 1978
- Recorded: April 23 & 28; May 2, 1978
- Genre: Vocal jazz
- Labels: Atlantic (original); Rhino (reissue, CD)
- Producers: Tim Hauser and Janis Siegel

The Manhattan Transfer chronology
| Pastiche (1978) | Live (1978) | Extensions (1979) |

The Manhattan Transfer Live was recorded by The Manhattan Transfer live at Manchester on April 23, 1978; Bristol on April 28, 1978; and the Hammersmith Odeon Theatre, London, on May 2, 1978. The album was produced by Tim Hauser and Janis Siegel. This was the final album made with Laurel Massé (due to a car accident in early 1979 and her decision to leave the group).

It was not originally issued in the U.S. in 1978 but in 1979 it was released as an Audiophile LP. A short-lived Japanese CD was released on October 10, 1987. It was finally officially issued on CD in the U.S. by Wounded Bird Records in 2005.

In the live performances there was a "15 minute Intermission" at the end of side one, between "Speak Up Mambo (Cuentame)" (CD track 8) and "In the Dark" (CD track 9).

== Background ==
The album was not issued in the United States in 1978. In the U.S. the album was issued as an Audiophile LP in 1979 by Mobile Fidelity Sound Lab in a collector's edition under the name "Original Master Recording" (discs made from the original masters). Until 2005, The Manhattan Transfer Live was the only album of the group that was not reissued in the U.S. on CD. Warner-Pioneer in Japan released a CD version in 1987.

The cover of the standard edition on Atlantic Records, described by Janis Siegel as "the worst cover in history (perhaps only after Mecca for Moderns and Coming Out)", is a drawing in a cartoon style of the four members of the group. It was reused for the Wounded Bird Records CD re-release of June 21, 2005, while the cover of the Mobile Fidelity Sound Lab edition is a photograph depicting the silhouette of the group at twilight (photography included in the inner envelope of the Atlantic version).

== Track listing ==
1. "That Cat Is High" - (J.M. Williams) - 3:15
2. "Snootie Little Cutie" - (Bobby Troup) - 3:19
3. "Four Brothers" - (Jimmy Giuffre, Jon Hendricks) - 3:56
4. "On a Little Street in Singapore" - (Billy Hill, Peter DeRose) - 3:36
5. "Java Jive" - (Milton Drake, Ben Oakland) - 2:54
6. "Walk In Love" - (David Batteau, John Klemmer) - 3:20
7. "Chanson D'Amour" - (Wayne Shanklin) - 2:36
8. "Speak Up Mambo (Cuentame)" - (Al Castellanos) - 3:21
9. "15 Minute Intermission" - (Sunny Skylar) - 1:36
10. "In the Dark" - (Lil Green, Bill Broonzy) - 4:14
11. "Je Voulais (Te Dire Que Je T'Attends)" - (Michel Jonasz, Pierre Grosz) - 4:49
12. "Sunday" - (Jule Styne, Chester Cohn, Bennie Krueger, Ned Miller) - - 0:41
13. "Candy" - (Mack David, Joan Whitney, Alex Kramer) - 3:35
14. "Well, Well, Well" - (Terry Shand, Billy Moll, Dick Robertson) - 1:52
15. "Freddy Morris Monologue" - (Alan Paul) - 1:07
16. "Bacon Fat" - (Andre Williams) - 3:33
17. "Turn Me Loose" - (Doc Pomus, Mort Shuman) - 2:50
18. "Operator" - (William Spivery) - 3:52
19. "Tuxedo Junction" - (Erskine Hawkins, William Johnson, Buddy Feyne, Julian Dash, ) - 3:01

== Personnel ==
The Manhattan Transfer

- Tim Hauser
- Laurel Massé
- Alan Paul
- Janis Siegel

Musicians

- Dave Wallace – keyboards
- Wayne Johnson – guitars
- Michael Schnoebelen – bass guitar, contrabass
- Peter Johnson – drums
- Don Roberts – flute
- Keith Bird, Derek Grossmith, Eddie Mordue, Don Roberts and Stan Sultzman – saxophone
- Cliff Hardie and David Horler – trombone
- Geof Perkins – bass trombone
- Tony Fisher, Bobby Haughey, Ronnie Hughes and Derek Watkins – trumpet
- David Katz – music contractor

== Production ==
- Producer – Tim Hauser
- Associate producer – Janis Siegel
- Recording and remix – Keith Grant
- Recorded on The Rolling Stones Mobile Unit
- Remixed at Olympic Studios (London, England).
- Management – Brian Avnet and Shep Gordon at Alive Enterprises.
- Management assistant – Joanna Fitzpatrick
- Road manager – David H. Banks
- Stage manager – John Cutcliffe
- Monitor mixer – Shawn Michael
- Lighting director – Sid Strong
- Wardrobe – Margo Banks
