= Al Picard =

Canadian ice hockey player (1923–2019)

- Born: March 17, 1923 Kapuskasing, Ontario, Canada
- Died: July 1, 2019 (aged 96) North Bay, Ontario, Canada
- Height: 5 ft 4 in (163 cm)
- Weight: 140 lb (64 kg; 10 st 0 lb)
- Position: Goaltender
- Shot: Left
- Played for: Sudbury Wolves; Buffalo Bisons; Dallas Texans; Oakland Oaks; Houston Skippers; Houston Huskies; Vancouver Canucks
- National team: Canada
- Playing career: 1941–1953
Medal record
Men's ice hockey
Silver medal – second place	1949 Stockholm	Ice hockey

Albert Patrick Picard (March 17, 1923 – July 1, 2019) was a Canadian ice hockey player with the Sudbury Wolves. He won a silver medal at the 1949 World Ice Hockey Championships in Stockholm, Sweden. He also played professionally with the Buffalo Bisons, Dallas Texans, Oakland Oaks, Houston Skippers, Houston Huskies, and Vancouver Canucks.
