= Alan Jackson (disambiguation) =

Alan Jackson (born 1958) is an American country music singer and songwriter.

Alan Jackson may also refer to:

- Alan Jackson (lawyer) (born 1965), American attorney
- Alan Jackson (cyclist) (1933–1974), British Olympic cyclist
- Alan Jackson (businessman) (1936–2018), Australian businessman
- Alan Jackson (footballer) (born 1938), English professional footballer
- Alan Jackson (poet) (born 1938), Scottish poet
- Alan Jackson (EastEnders), character in EastEnders
- Alan Jackson, a character in BBC Cymru Wales' The Sarah Jane Adventures

== See also ==
- Allan Jackson (1915–1976), American radio broadcaster
- Allan Jackson (rugby union), English rugby union player
- Al Jackson (disambiguation)
