= Al Reavis =

American baseball player

- Pitcher
- Born: May 11, 1893; Brunswick, Virginia, U.S.
- Died: August 24, 1950 (aged 57); New Rochelle, New York, U.S.

Negro league baseball debut
- 1920, for the Lincoln Giants

Last appearance
- 1921, for the Bacharach Giants

Teams
- Lincoln Giants (1920–1921); Bacharach Giants (1921)

Alfred Langston Reavis (May 11, 1893 – August 24, 1950) was an American Negro league pitcher in the 1920s.

A native of Brunswick, Virginia, Reavis attended Virginia Normal & Industrial Institute. He played for the Lincoln Giants in 1920, and for both Lincoln and the Bacharach Giants the following season. Reavis died in New Rochelle, New York in 1950 at age 57.
