= Al Prince =

Al Prince (died April 8, 2010) was an American-born French Polynesian journalist and tourism expert. Prince was regarded as one of French Polynesia's leading experts on tourism for more than 39 years.

Prince was born and raised in the New England region of the northeast United States. He began his career in journalism in Texas, before moving to Tahiti in 1971 with his then wife, journalist Jan Prince. According to a February 27, 1983, article in the Milwaukee Journal, "Prince was working for the Houston Post when someone told him about an ad for a reporter in the Tahiti Bulletin. He recalls telling himself, 'Tahiti sounds more interesting than Texas', and so he made the move." Prince and his wife divorced in the early 1980s, but continued to collaborate on several French Polynesian publications, including Tahiti Today magazine and the weekly, English-language newspaper Tahiti Sun Press, which is now the Tahiti Beach Press.

Prince worked as a journalist, based in Tahiti, for nearly 40 years. He wrote his first stories in French Polynesia for the Tahiti Bulletin, where he also served as its publisher. In the 1990s, Prince began working as a writer for the GIE Tahiti Tourisme, which promotes and markets French Polynesia as a tourist destination. Prince also worked for GIE Perles de Tahiti, an entity which promotes Tahitian black pearls overseas.

In 2002, Al Prince began reporting for Tahitipresse, the bilingual French-English online press agency of the Agence Tahitienne de Presse (Tahiti Press Agency), or ATP. He continued to write for Tahitipresse until shortly before his death in 2010.

Al Prince died of a lengthy illness in Tahiti on April 8, 2010, at the age of 67.
