= Who's Who In The Wrestling World - And Why? =

1927 film

Who's Who in the Wrestling World
- Directed by: Al Daff
- Produced by: Al Daff
- Production company: Universal
- Release date: 10 August 1927 (private screening)
- Running time: 20 mins
- Country: Australia
- Language: Silent
- Budget: £13
- Box office: £1300

Who's Who In The Wrestling World – And Why? is a 1927 short Australian film. It was a 20-minute send up of wrestling. It was made by Al Daff who went on to become one of the most successful Australian-born film executives of all time.

The film was shot in Melbourne.

The wrestlers included Australian champions Weber and Meeske.
