= Al Cromwell =

Canadian musician (1938–1995)

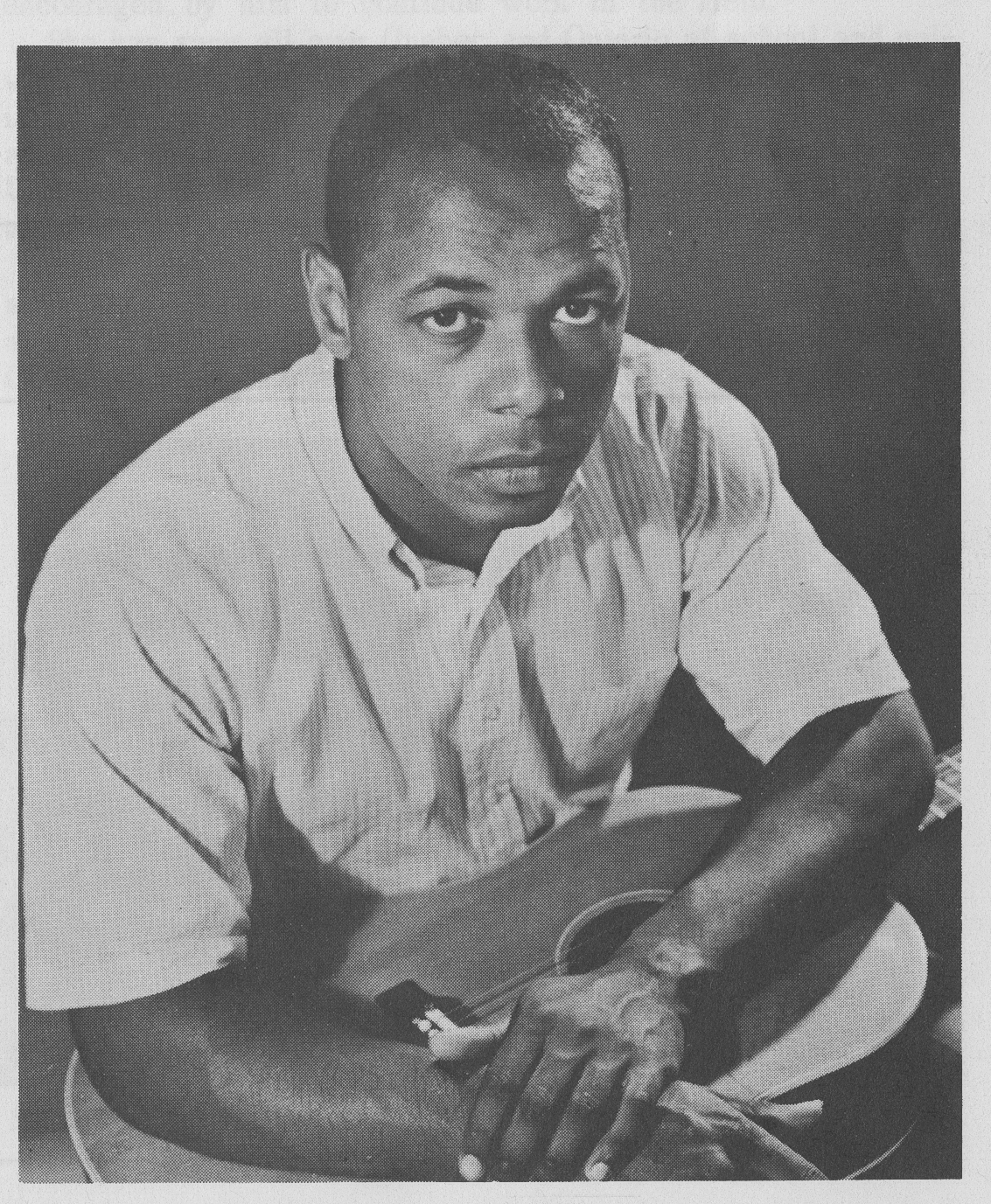
- Cromwell, c. 1963

Background information
- Born: 1938
- Died: September 28, 1995 (aged 56–57)
- Genres: Folk; R&B; spirituals
- Occupation(s): Singer, instrumentalist
- Years active: 1963–1995

Alan Cromwell (1938 – 28 September 1995) was a Canadian blues and folk musician who was active on the folk scene in Toronto, during the 1960s and 1970s, where he performed at Steele's Tavern, the Horseshoe Tavern, The Purple Onion and various venues in Kensington Market and Yorkville, Toronto. From Phinneys Cove, Nova Scotia, he learned spirituals, blues, and folk songs from his father, Norman Cromwell.

Cromwell performed during the early years of the Mariposa Folk Festival, notably in 1963.

In the 1980s, Cromwell became better known as a blues player, playing with Sonny Terry, Brownie McGhee and Josh White. He continued to be a regular live performer in Toronto throughout the 1980s and 1990s in jazz and folk clubs. He is included on the live album Grossman's Live issued in 1987.

Cromwell died in Toronto on September 28, 1995. He was posthumously inducted as a memorial member of the Porcupine Awards Hall of Fame. An award was established in his name in the Folk/Blues category in the same year.
