= Al Buehler =

American athletics coach

Al Buehler was an American former track and cross-country coach at Duke University. His cross-country teams captured six ACC championships and finished second on 10 occasions. Buehler was active in the U.S. Olympic program, serving as coach or manager at 1972, 1984 and 1988 Games. He served as the chairman of the Health, Physical Education, and Recreation department at Duke and teaches a freshman seminar on the history of American sports (PHYSEDU 89S - History and Issues of Sport). In 2010 there was a documentary about Coach Buehler.
