= Al R. Johanson =

American lawyer and politician

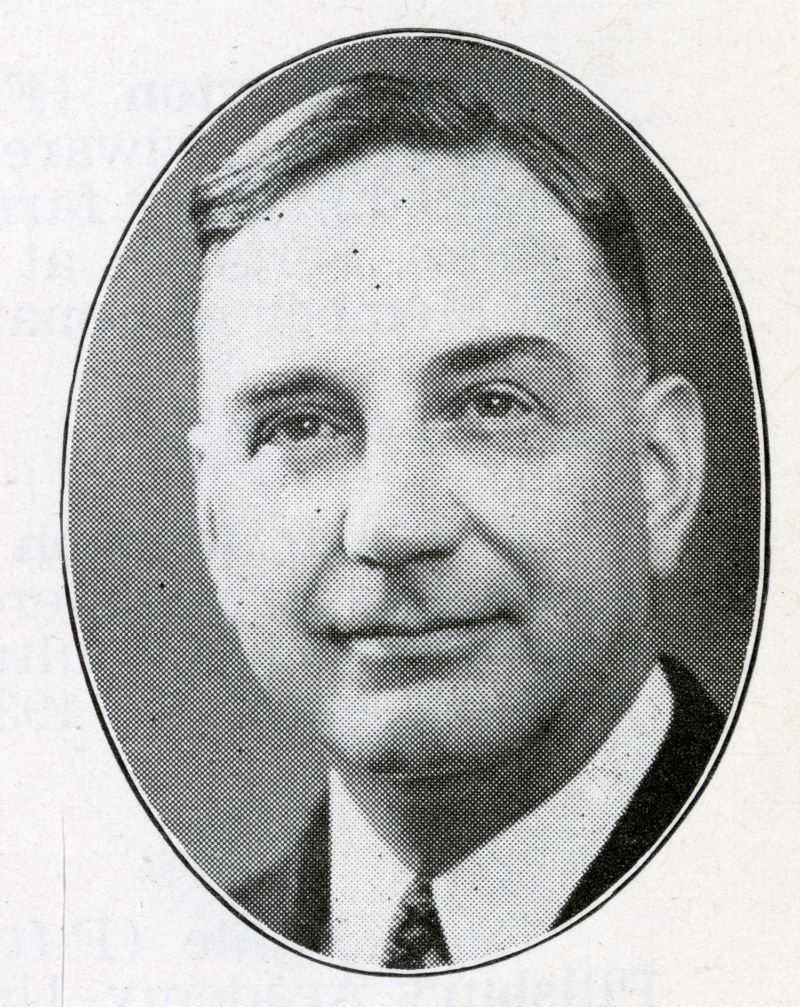

Member of the Minnesota Senate from the 48 district

Personal details
- Born: May 28, 1899
- Died: March 30, 1964 (aged 64)

Al R. Johanson (May 28, 1899 – March 30, 1964) was an American lawyer and politician who served in the Minnesota Senate from 1943 to 1954.

Johanson was born in Traverse County, Minnesota on March 30, 1964, and graduated from Wheaton High School in Wheaton, Minnesota. He received his bachelor's degree from the University of Minnesota in 1922 and his law degree from the University of Minnesota Law School in 1924. He lived with his wife and family in Wheaton, Minnesota, and practiced law in Wheaton. Johanson served on the United States Civilian Defense Council and was the Traverse County chair. He also served as the mayor of Wheaton, Minnesota. Johanson served in the Minnesota Senate representing district 48 from 1943 to 1954.
