= Al G. Manning =

American occult writer (1927–2006)

Al G. Manning (June 19, 1927 – April 8, 2006) was an American author, occultist, certified public accountant, and the founder of ESP Lab of Texas (formerly ESP Laboratory in Los Angeles, California). He authored 23 self-help books and 11 correspondence courses, many tapes and videos, with 40 years of monthly ESP LAB newsletters, mostly related to the development and use of psychic powers for personal and planetary benefit with positive spiritual development. These included intuition, clairvoyance, clairaudience, spirit contact, astral projection, and others. His work is carried on by the ESP Lab, now located in Colorado.

== Bibliography ==
- Eye of Newt in My Martini: a Certified Public Accountant Turned Occultist Tells Why and How (1981), Pan Ishtar Unlimited ISBN 0-941698-01-7, ISBN 978-0-941698-01-6
- Faerie Tales Are True - Get Your Share (with Rachel L. Manning) (1986), Pan/Ishtar Unlimited ISBN 0-941698-12-2, ISBN 978-0-941698-12-2
- Helping Yourself with ESP: Tap the Power of Extra-Sensory Perception and Make It Work for You (1999), Prentice Hall Press ISBN 0-7352-0124-2, ISBN 978-0-7352-0124-8
- Helping Yourself with Psycho-Cosmic Power (1983), Pan/Ishtar Unlimited ISBN 0-941698-06-8, ISBN 978-0-941698-06-1
- Helping Yourself with the Power of Gnostic Magic (1984), Pan/Ishtar Unlimited ISBN 0-941698-11-4, ISBN 978-0-941698-11-5
- Helping Yourself with Real Spirit Contact (1990), Pan Ishtar Unlimited ISBN 0-941698-18-1, ISBN 978-0-941698-18-4
- Helping Yourself with White Witchcraft (2002), Prentice Hall Press ISBN 0-7352-0373-3, ISBN 978-0-7352-0373-0
- How to Get the Most Out of Life: a Novel Approach That Works Because It's Fun (1988), Pan Ishtar Unlimited ISBN 0-941698-17-3, ISBN 978-0-941698-17-7
- Life After Death? Sex? Dinner?: The Lighter Side of the Occult (1983), Pan Ishtar Unlimited ISBN 0-941698-07-6, ISBN 978-0-941698-07-8
- The Magic of New Ishtar Power (1978), Prentice Hall ISBN 0-13-545137-X, ISBN 978-0-13-545137-3
- Mighty Maverick Magick (The Essence of Victorious Living) (1983), Pan Ishtar Unlimited
- Miracle of Universal Psychic Power: How to Pyramid Your Way to Prosperity (1974) Prentice Hall Trade ISBN 0-13-585729-5, ISBN 978-0-13-585729-8
- Miracle Spiritology (1975), Pan/Ishtar Unlimited ISBN 0-13-585745-7, ISBN 978-0-13-585745-8
- The Miraculous Laws of Universal Dynamics (1964), Pan Ishtar Unlimited ISBN 0-317-46046-3, ISBN 978-0-317-46046-9 (reprinted by Prentice Hall 1965)
- Moon Lore and Moon Magic (1980), Pan Ishtar Unlimited ISBN 0-13-600668-X, ISBN 978-0-13-600668-8
- Rainbows Falling on My Head: The Magic of the Great God Pan (1982), Pan/Ishtar Unlimited ISBN 0-941698-03-3, ISBN 978-0-941698-03-0
- Real Ritual Magick (For People Ready to Enjoy Life, NOW) (1987), Pan Ishtar Unlimited ISBN 0-941698-15-7, ISBN 978-0-941698-15-3
- Your Golden Key to Success (1982), Pan Ishtar Unlimited ISBN 0-941698-05-X, ISBN 978-0-941698-05-4
- You're Beautiful: Quick Reference Self Help Program for All Situations (1987), Pan Ishtar Unlimited ISBN 0-941698-16-5, ISBN 978-0-941698-16-0
