= Brunswick, Virginia =

Unincorporated community in Virginia, United States

Coordinates: 36°38′52″N 77°52′14″W

Brunswick is an unincorporated community located in Brunswick County, in the U.S. state of Virginia.
