= Al Fasoldt =

American journalist

- Citizenship: American
- Occupation: Journalist

Al Fasoldt is an American columnist for the Syracuse Post-Standard. He wrote the "Technofile" column, reviewing and commenting on computer technology. His column has a question/answer format where his alter ego, "Doctor Gizmo", addresses computers, digital technology, and photography. For several years Fasoldt, along with Gene Wolf, had a Sunday call-in radio show, "Random Access", on WSYR am radio in Syracuse, New York and Central New York. Fasoldt and Wolf answered questions on computers, operating systems, and other technological subjects.

Fasoldt has been a reporter, writer and editor since 1963, when he was a Saigon Bureau Chief for Stars and Stripes during the Vietnam War. His work has appeared in Fanfare Magazine, Esquire, and many online publications.
