= Al Bryant =

Canadian football player (1930–2021)

Profile
- Position: Halfback

Personal information
- Born: September 30, 1930; Edmonton, Alberta, Canada
- Died: April 16, 2021 (aged 90); Edmonton, Alberta, Canada
- Listed height: 5 ft 10 in (1.78 m)
- Listed weight: 160 lb (73 kg)

Career history
- 1952–1954: Edmonton Eskimos

Awards and highlights
- Grey Cup champion (1954)

Alvin Eugene Bryant (September 30, 1930 – April 16, 2021) was a Canadian professional football player who played for the Edmonton Eskimos. He won the Grey Cup with the Eskimos in 1954.
