= Al Paul =

American athlete, coach, and administrator

Biographical details
- Born: c. 1926
- Died: July 28, 2014 (aged 88); Maryland, U.S.

Coaching career (HC unless noted)

Football
- 1951–1959: Hofstra (line)
- 1960–1973: Columbia (assistant)

Lacrosse
- 1947–1948: Western Maryland

Administrative career (AD unless noted)
- 1974–1991: Columbia

Head coaching record
- Overall: 7–8

Al Paul (c. 1926 – July 28, 2014) was an American college athlete, football and lacrosse coach, and college athletics administrator. He served as the athletic director at Columbia University from 1974 to 1991. A native of Baltimore, Maryland, Paul attended Western Maryland College—now known as McDaniel College—where he played football, basketball, and lacrosse. While an undergraduate, he also served as the school's head lacrosse coach, in 1947 and 1948. Paul died at the age of 88 on July 28, 2014, at his home in Maryland.
