= Al Lindow =

American football player (1919–1989)

Profile
- Position: Halfback

Personal information
- Born: July 9, 1919; Milwaukee, Wisconsin
- Died: January 18, 1989 (aged 69); Fort Lauderdale, Florida
- Listed height: 6 ft 0 in (1.83 m)
- Listed weight: 165 lb (75 kg)

Career information
- High school: University School of Milwaukee
- College: Washington University in St. Louis

Career history
- Chicago Cardinals (1945)
- Stats at Pro Football Reference

Allen Lapham Lindow (July 9, 1919 – January 18, 1989) was a halfback in the National Football League. He attended University School of Milwaukee and later played college football as a halfback at Washington University in St. Louis. He was a member of the Chicago Cardinals during the 1945 NFL season.
