= Al Cannava =

American football player (1924–2017)

No. 42
- Positions: Halfback, defensive back

Personal information
- Born: May 24, 1924; Boston, Massachusetts, U.S.
- Died: September 24, 2017 (aged 93)

Career information
- College: Boston College

Career history
- Green Bay Packers (1950)

Awards and highlights
- Boston College Varsity Club Athletic Hall of Fame, 1984

Career statistics
- Rushing att-yards: 1-2
- Receptions-yards: 1-28
- Touchdowns: 0
- Stats at Pro Football Reference

Anthony Louis Cannava (May 24, 1924 – September 24, 2017) was an American football halfback/defensive back in the National Football League (NFL) who played for the Green Bay Packers. He was born in Medford, Massachusetts and was an all-star running back at Medford High School. He then entered the U.S. Navy in the midst of World War II. In 1944 his ship was sunk by the Japanese and he survived several days at sea before rescue. He was decorated by Franklin Roosevelt for his service. Cannava entered the NFL after playing college ball at Boston College. He played one game for the Packers in the 1950 season, and then retired from professional football. He died on September 24, 2017, at the age of 93.
