= Al Wadud =

Bangladeshi cricketer

Personal information
- Full name: Al Wadud
- Nickname: Sweet

Domestic team information
- Years: Team
- 2003–04: Sylhet Division

Career statistics
Competition	FC
Matches	3
Runs scored	20
Batting average	5.00
100s/50s	–/–
Top score	11*
Balls bowled	252
Wickets	7
Bowling average	17.71
5 wickets in innings	–
10 wickets in match	–
Best bowling	3/37
Catches/stumpings	–/–
- Source: CricketArchive, 17 January 2011

Al Wadud (date of birth to be confirmed) is a Bangladeshi former first-class cricketer who played in three matches for Sylhet Division in the 2003–04 season. He has sometimes been referenced on scorecards by his nickname "Sweet". Al Wadud's batting and bowling styles are unconfirmed. He took seven first-class wickets at the average of 17.71 with a best performance of 3 for 37 against Rajshahi Division. He totalled 20 runs with a highest score of 11*.
