= Al Logan =

American football coach

Playing career
- 1978–1982: Muskingum
- Position: Offensive lineman

Coaching career (HC unless noted)
- 1983–1984: John Carroll (DB)
- 1985–1993: Sewanee (assistant)
- 1994–1995: Sewanee
- 1996–1998: Sewanee (assistant)
- 1999–2003: Davidson (assistant)
- 2004–2006: Wittenberg (OC)
- 2006: Muskingum (OC)
- 2007–2017: Muskingum

Head coaching record
- Overall: 33–95

Accomplishments and honors

Awards
- OAC Coach of the Year (2009)

Al Logan is an American former college football coach. He served as the head football coach at Sewanee: The University of the South from 1994 to 1995 and Muskingum University from 2007 to 2017. Logan also was an assistant coach at John Carroll University from 1983 to 1984, at Sewanee from 1985 to 1993 and again from 1996 to 1998, at Davidson College from 1999 to 2003 and at Wittenberg University from 2004 to 2006 prior to taking a position as offensive coordinator at Muskingum in 2016. During his tenure as head coach with Muskingum, opponents were 73–6 (.924) against Al Logan when scoring 21 or more points. The Muskies were only 2–57 (.033) under Logan when playing Ohio Athletic Conference teams that finished with winning records in the conference: Ohio Northern in 2008 and 2011.

== Head coaching record ==
Year	Team	Overall	Conference	Standing	Bowl/playoffs
Sewanee Tigers (Southern Collegiate Athletic Conference) (1994–1995)
1994	Sewanee	1–8	1–3	4th	
1995	Sewanee	3–6	1–3	4th	
Sewanee:		4–14	2–6		
Muskingum Fighting Muskies (Ohio Athletic Conference) (2007–2017)
2007	Muskingum	0–10	0–9	10th	
2008	Muskingum	3–7	2–7	9th	
2009	Muskingum	4–6	4–5	5th	
2010	Muskingum	3–7	2–7	8th	
2011	Muskingum	4–6	3–6	7th	
2012	Muskingum	3–7	3–6	7th	
2013	Muskingum	2–8	2–7	8th	
2014	Muskingum	3–7	3–6	7th	
2015	Muskingum	1–9	1–8	9th	
2016	Muskingum	4–6	3–6	7th	
2017	Muskingum	2–8	1–8	8th	
Muskingum:		29–81	24–75		
Total:		33–95			
