= Al Anstey =

American media executive (born 1966)

- Born: 22 April 1966 (age 60); London, UK
- Education: University of Bath (MSc)
- Occupations: Media Executive & Strategic Advisor on Media and Communications.
- Known for: Former CEO of Al Jazeera America, and CEO of Collingwood Worldwide

Al Anstey (born 22 April 1966) is a media executive and strategic advisor on media and communications. He was CEO of Al Jazeera America in 2015, and managing director of Al Jazeera English (AJE) in 2010. He is the CEO of Collingwood Worldwide.

== Background and education ==
Anstey was born in London and educated at Westminster School. He holds an MSc degree in Social Psychology from University of Bath.

== Career ==
Anstey has worked in media for three decades. He was part of the start-up of Associated Press Television News, was Head of Foreign News at ITN (2000), was part launch team of Al Jazeera English as deputy director of news and then as managing director, and led the turnaround of Al Jazeera America as CEO from 2015 to 2016.

Anstey was also Network Director of Media Development and Head of New Media at Al Jazeera Network and oversaw the digital properties and digital strategy at both AJAM and AJE.

During Anstey's tenure as managing director of AJE, it grew from being a newly launched news channel to gaining a reputation for quality worldwide, winning a number of major TV awards, and building distribution to over 300 million homes in over 130 countries.

During the unlawful detention of Al Jazeera English staff in Egypt in 2014, Anstey called for their release worldwide with the FreeAJStaff campaign, and campaigned for a free media, and the right for people worldwide to be properly informed.

Al Jazeera America was closed by Al Jazeera's parent company in 2016 as it was no longer sustainable given the economic challenges in US media marketplace, though it was recognised for the quality of its journalism and the progress made prior to closure.

Since leaving Al Jazeera America, Anstey founded has been CEO of Collingwood Worldwide, advising international companies on media strategy and communications. Notable projects include advising the Global Commission on Adaptation chaired by former UN Secretary General, Ban Ki-moon, Bill Gates, and Kristalina Georgieva to raise awareness of the need to build resilience to the impacts of climate change worldwide.

Since 2016, Anstey has also conducted media "masterclasses" for the Thomson Foundation in both Morocco and Lebanon, and given speeches and lectures on integrity in journalism.

Since 2016, Anstey has been Chair of the board of trustees of People Need Nature, a UK based charity which exists to highlight the benefits that nature focused on achieving long term positive change.

== See also ==
- Al Jazeera controversies and criticism
