= Al Wiley =

Alan Scott Wiley
Profile
- Position: Guard

Personal information
- Born: c. 1928
- Died: 11 April 1998; Guelph, Ontario, Canada
- Listed height: 5 ft 10 in (1.78 m)
- Listed weight: 200 lb (91 kg)

Career history
- 1950–1954: Winnipeg Blue Bombers

Al Wiley (c. 1928–11 April 1998) was a Canadian football player who played for the Winnipeg Blue Bombers. He previously played football at the University of Western Ontario.
