= Tahitipresse =

Tahiti presse was the online press agency of the Agence Tahitienne de Presse (ATP), also known as the Tahiti Press Agency. The bilingual news agency, which published in both French and English, was headquartered in Tahiti and covered the news and current events of French Polynesia.
