= Al Bernstein (artist) =

Austrian artist

Al Bernstein (born 1949 in Austria) is an artist originating from Austria, who created his major work in the USA. Bernstein moved from Austria to the USA in 1979. Bernstein produced over 900 pieces of work in his first, classical, phase. His handprinted artist book, "The Florida book of plates - in concert with nature" was published in 1985. Further handprinted books and so-called Pigmentographs followed. A small selection of Pigmentographs were exhibited in a project with the Deutsche Bahn AG in 24 German cities (e.g.: Karlsruhe, Frankfurt/Main, Hamburg, Berlin, Dresden), 1997.

== Pigmentography ==
Pigmentograph is a printing technology developed by the artist as a trace-print technique in the 1970s, and designated as Pigmentograph in 1980. The image is drawn or painted on a carrier template or film. Subsequently, the printing forms, the color separations of the motive, are cut and stung in the positive negative procedure. During the printing-process color is brushed by hand through the printing forms and fixed afterwards. There is practically no limitation of the size, the number of the colors, or hand pulled prints. In comparison to industrial screen printing, a Pigmentograph cannot be automated. It remains a pure hand pulled artprint with by hand made forms, a Polyautograph. Strictly speaking the Pigmentograph stands as an original between Polyautograph and Monotype.

Its possible, to pull a larger edition, however, it is not possible to pull two completely identical prints because mutation structures, which Al Bernstein calls short blast structures.

== Honors and awards ==
- 1982 Paddington Prize Award NY.NY
- 1988 Ibiza Prize Award
- 1989 Art Horizon Award NY. NY
- 1990 appointment as Professor artis honoris, Academia Europea,
- 1990 honour member of the Fundacion Academia Europea de Artes y Ciencias, Casa de los Artistas, Spain.
