= Al Manning =

Australian rugby union player

Al Manning (born 14 February 1982) is a rugby union player for the New South Wales Waratahs in the Super Rugby competition. He plays as a hooker.
