= Al Stevenson =

Canadian football player (1921–1958)

Profile
- Positions: Offensive tackle, Defensive tackle

Personal information
- Born: December 23, 1921; Montreal, Quebec, Canada
- Died: January 4, 1958 (aged 36)

Career information
- College: none - Strathcona Academy

Career history
- 1945: Montreal Hornets
- 1946–1951: Montreal Alouettes

Awards and highlights
- Grey Cup champion (1949)

Al Stevenson (December 23, 1921 – January 4, 1958) was a Grey Cup champion Canadian Football League player. He played offensive and defensive tackle.

Stevenson played his first football with Strathcona Academy in Outremont, Quebec. He began his pro career in 1945 with the Montreal Hornets and played with the inaugural Montreal Alouettes team in 1946. He was part of the Larks first Grey Cup championship. He played 59 games for the Als over 6 seasons (but was retired for almost all of the 1948 season due to business matters.). He later pursued a career in the Canadian Army, serving in West Germany and Korea and becoming a sergeant (and coaching the Royal Military Academy team in Kingston, Ontario.) He died in a car accident on January 4, 1958.
