= Al Ackland =

Canadian football offensive end (born c. 1940)

Profile
- Position: Offensive lineman

Personal information
- Born: 1940 (age 85–86); Winnipeg, Manitoba, Canada
- Listed height: 6 ft 3 in (1.91 m)
- Listed weight: 195 lb (88 kg)

Career information
- High school: Churchill HS
- Junior: Weston Wildcats

Career history
- 1961: Winnipeg Blue Bombers

Al Ackland (born c. 1940) is a Canadian former professional football offensive end. Ackland played in two games for the Winnipeg Blue Bombers of the Canadian Football League during the 1961 season.
