= A. E. "Mike" Bentzin =

American football player and politician (1902–1979)

A. E. Bentzin

49th Mayor of Watertown, Wisconsin
- In office April 1967 – April 1969
- Preceded by: Robert P. White
- Succeeded by: Kenneth R. Wilkes

Personal details
- Born: March 7, 1902 Watertown, Wisconsin
- Died: January 6, 1979 (aged 76) Watertown Memorial Hospital, Watertown, Wisconsin, U.S.
- Resting place: Oak Hill Cemetery, Watertown
- Spouse: Joy Soulen (m. 1928–1979)
- Children: Scott Lee Bentzin; Charles G. Bentzin
- Football career

Profile
- Position: Guard

Personal information
- Listed height: 6 ft 0 in (1.83 m)
- Listed weight: 188 lb (85 kg)

Career information
- High school: Watertown (WI)
- College: Marquette

Career history
- Racine Legion (1924)

Career statistics
- Games played: 10
- Stats at Pro Football Reference

Alfred Ernest "Mike" Bentzin (March 7, 1902 – January 6, 1979) was an American professional athlete, grocer, and politician from Watertown, Wisconsin. He played guard for the Racine Legion National Football League team during the 1924 NFL season. Later in life, he was the 49th mayor of Watertown, Wisconsin, and was president of the Wisconsin Grocers Association.

== Biography ==
Mike Bentzin was born, raised, and lived nearly his entire life in Watertown, Wisconsin. While attending Watertown High School, Bentzin began playing American football.

After graduating from Watertown High School, he attended Marquette University. At Marquette, Bentzin played for the Marquette Golden Avalanche football team, as a guard. He was one of several Marquette players injured by a truck accident in 1922. The Marquette team was undefeated for 1922 and 1923 seasons.

Bentzin graduated in 1924. That fall he signed with the Racine Legion National Football League team. He played guard for the Legion for one season.

After his football career, Bentzin returned to Watertown where he began operating a grocery store. The grocery business was his primary occupation for the rest of his life.

He made his first run for mayor of Watertown in 1961. In 1961, Watertown was holding their first mayoral election since 1948—the year that Watertown voters elected to abolish the mayoral system and replace it with a city manager. In 1960, voters elected to return to a mayoral system. Bentzin and former city councilmember George Shephard survived the nonpartisan (top two) primary. County board member Robert P. White ran as a write-in candidate. Despite coming in fourth in the nonpartisan primary, White prevailed in the general election, defeating Bentzin and Shephard. White was also the Jefferson County Republican Party chairman. Bentzin ran for mayor again in 1965, but lost again to White.

Bentzin made a third run in 1967, again challenging Robert P. White. White came in third in the nonpartisan primary and was therefore not nominated for the general election ballot, but as he did in 1961, White ran a write-in campaign for a fourth term as mayor. This time Bentzin prevailed, receiving 38% of the vote in the three-person race.

Housing discrimination was a major local issue during Bentzin's mayoral term, which coincided with the consideration of the Civil Rights Act of 1968 in Congress. Bentzin ultimately cast a tie-breaking vote in the city council to table the city's fair housing ordinance in December 1967, saying that because Watertown only had one black family, the ordinance wasn't needed. As a leader in his church, Bentzin also subsequently voted to fire their pastor Alan Kromholz, who had been active in the fair housing campaign in the city. The fair housing debate in Watertown and the firing of Kromholz was memorialized in a 1972 book called Crisis in Watertown: The Polarization of an American Community, but sociologist Lynn Eden.

During his term as mayor, he also approved a land deal for Madison Area Technical College to acquire land for a Watertown campus.

Bentzin ran for re-election as mayor in 1969, but lost the general election to city councilmember Kenneth Wilkes.

Bentzin died at Watertown Memorial Hospital on January 9, 1979, after a long illness.

== Personal life and family ==
Mike Bentzin was one of three children of Charles "Carl" Bentzin and his wife Emma Marie (née Muster). Carl Bentzin was a German American immigrant, from the Mecklenburg region. Emma was a first generation American, the daughter of German American immigrants.

Mike Bentzin married Joy Soulen, of Phillips, Wisconsin, in the Fall of 1928. They had three sons together, Scott Lee, Charles Gilbert, and David Allan Bentzin.

Political offices
Preceded by Robert P. White	Mayor of Watertown, Wisconsin; April 1967 – April 1969	Succeeded by Kenneth R. Wilkes
