= Houston Skippers =

Texan ice hockey team

The Houston Skippers were a minor league ice hockey team based in Houston, Texas. They were a member of the United States Hockey League, and played for only season, 1946.

Houston was awarded a franchise from the USHL on May 12, 1946. The team name was chosen in honor of the "skippers" of the boats in the Houston Ship Channel. The Skippers played their first game on the road on October 26, 1946, and their first home game on November 14, 1946. Their home ice was at the Sam Houston Coliseum.

The Skippers finished in last place in the 1946 season. Before the start of the 1947 season, the Skippers changed their name to the Houston Huskies.
