= Al Blaustein =

American artist (1924–2004)

- Born: January 23, 1924; New York, New York
- Died: July 15, 2004 (aged 80); New York, New York
- Known for: Artist, Educator
- Website: alblaustein.com

Alfred H. Blaustein (1924-2004) was an American painter and printmaker.

== Biography ==
Blaustein was born on January 23, 1924, in New York City, where he attended the High School of Music & Art He served in the United States Air Force for three years during World War II. Blaustein went on to study at Cooper Union and the Skowhegan School of Painting and Sculpture.

Blaustein started his artistic career working for magazines including Fortune, Life, Natural History, and The Reporter.

Blaustein taught from 1949 through 2004, first at the Albright Art School, then at Yale University. He taught at the Pratt Institute for 45 years from 1959 through 2004. At Pratt he served, for a time, as Chairman of Printmaking.

He was the recipient of fellowships from the Guggenheim Foundation in 1958 and 1961. He was also the recipient of the Prix de Rome. His work is in the collections of the Art Institute of Chicago, the Smithsonian American Art Museum, the National Gallery of Art and the Metropolitan Museum of Art

Blaustein married Lotte Heilbrunn on 13 May 1949. They had a son Marc. Both Lotte and Marc were graphic designers. Blaustein died in New York City on July 15, 2004. A collection of his works and papers is at Rutgers University in the Special Collections and University Archives.
