= Al Carrell =

American journalist

Albert Raymond "Al" Carrell (September 2, 1925 – August 27, 2014) was an American columnist, author, radio personality, and home construction/improvement expert. Carrell's column ran in over 250 newspapers in the U.S.

== Personal ==
In 1951, Carrell and his wife moved to Dallas, Texas. Carrell graduated from Woodrow Wilson High School (Dallas, Texas) and in 1999, was inducted into Woodrow's Hall of Fame. On August 27, 2014, Carrell died of pneumonia in Dallas.

== Career ==
Carrell began his career writing a syndicated newspaper column for The Dallas Morning News. It appeared in this newspaper for 20 years. Carrell was a spokesman for the Home Depot in its early days from its creation in 1979 up until the early 90s. A Dallas radio station called him and wanted him to start up his own show where listeners would call in to ask for advice. The show was nationally known as The Handy Man Show. His daughter was a co-host with him on his show and hopes to continue the show with a different name, "Super Handy Mom". The program ran on KSKY-AM (660). While no longer the company spokesman, Carrell's subsequent endeavors were often sponsored by Home Depot. He spent over 30 years on radio, helping citizens in North Texas with household repairs.

== Books ==
Carrell wrote six books, including The Super Handyman’s Encyclopedia of Home Repair Hints. His last book is called The Super Handyman’s Home Care Almanac.

== Family ==
Carrell married his wife, Jean, and they had daughters Kelly and Meg. His father was a postal worker.

== Sources ==
- Biographical Information
