= Al Wohlman =

American actor

- Occupations: Actor and vaudeville performer
- Years active: 1920-1930

Al Wohlman was an American film and theatre actor; he was also a vaudeville performer.

== Biography ==
Wohlamn appeared in Fanchon & Marcos' Satires of 1920, and a Broadway-theatre production of the musical revue The Girl from Gay Paree (1926–1927) at the Winter Garden Theatre in New York City, New York.

He then appeared in Doctor of Melody (1929).

== Discography ==
Al Wohlman and the Gay Boys

- Oliver Naylor — Oliver Naylor and His Seven Aces (1924–1925)
- Josephine Baker — Un Message Pour Toi (1926–1937)
