= Al Mok =

American computer scientist

Aloysius "Al" Mok is an American computer scientist, currently the Quincy Lee Centennial Professor at University of Texas at Austin, and also a published author.
