= Al Paton =

Al Paton is a musician from South Africa and Namibia.

== Music career ==
=== 1990s ===
In the 1990s, Paton supported Springbok Nude Girls and Johnny Clegg. He co-formed the band Desert Velvet which won the NBC Music Makers Award and the Stage Magazine Recording Sponsorship. The band also appeared on the South African television show Going Nowhere Slowly.

=== 2000s ===
Paton joined interactive drumming company Drum Cafe teaching African drumming and djembe, performing for President Thabo Mbeki and Archbishop Desmond Tutu. "Matchstick Man", co-written with Desert Velvet and produced by Chris Acker, reached the top 40 pop-rock charts on Garageband.com and Top 15 Lyrics of all-time in pop-rock. Top 10 of the Vivacious Voice National Songwriting Contest: "Peachy" at number 6 and "Always" at number 19. He co-wrote lyrics for the Western Cape's National cricket team song (the Cape Cobras), with his mother, Lesley Paton. The song was produced by Gabi Le Roux (Mandoza, Jack Hammer) with executive producer Clive Ridgeway (Judith Sepuma).

=== 2010s ===
Paton performed in 17 countries with Drum Cafe.

== Discography ==
- Just Encasement - East London Sessions (1994)
- Desert Velvet - Recorded at The Warehouse, Windhoek, Namibia (1997)
- Desert Velvet - Mars Demo (2000)
- Video 'Ghost in the Ceiling' Directed by Mito Skellern, DOP Gerhard Engelbrecht (2002)
- Desert Velvet - London Connection Sessions (2004)
- Going Nowhere Slowly - Soundtrack to the TV series (Various Artists) (2005)
- Desert Velvet - Boomcat Sessions (2006)
- Like Fire, Like Honey (Various Artists) (2007)
- Pools of Sorrow, Pools of Joy (Various Artists) (2008)
- African Drumming (2008)
- Al Paton (2009)
