= Al Leonzi =

American football coach

Biographical details
- Born: December 30, 1942; Coaldale, Pennsylvania, U.S.
- Died: February 14, 2014 (aged 71); Philadelphia, Pennsylvania, U.S.

Coaching career (HC unless noted)
- 1984: Kutztown
- 1993–1997: Kutztown

Head coaching record
- Overall: 25–35–1

Al Leonzi (December 30, 1942 – February 14, 2014) was an American football coach.

He served as the head football coach at the Kutztown University of Pennsylvania.
