= Al J Thompson =

American photographer

Al J Thompson (born 1980) is a Jamaican-born American photographer, living in New York City.

== Life and work ==
Thompson was born on the island of Jamaica. In 1996, aged 16, he moved to Spring Valley in Rockland County, New York. He now lives in New York City.

His first book, Remnants of an Exodus (2021), was made in Spring Valley and is about gentrification.

== Publications ==
- Remnants of an Exodus. New York (state): Gnomic, 2021. With an essay by Shane Rocheleau, "Gathering Remnants".
