= Phinneys Cove =

Community in Nova Scotia, Canada

Coordinates: 44°53′2.96″N 65°23′41.08″W

Phinney's Cove in Nova Scotia

Phinneys Cove is a community in the Canadian province of Nova Scotia, located in Annapolis County.
