= Al Meyerhoff =

Albert Henry "Al" Meyerhoff Jr. (September 20, 1947 – December 21, 2008) was an American labor, environmental and civil rights attorney. One of his cases sought to eliminate sweatshop conditions for workers on the island of Saipan, a part of the Commonwealth of the Northern Mariana Islands that operates under the jurisdiction of the United States federal court system.

== Early life and education ==
Meyerhoff was born on September 20, 1947, in Ellington, Connecticut. He attended the University of Connecticut, graduating in 1969, and received his law degree from the Cornell Law School in 1972. He later told the Cornell Web magazine that he had been bullied as a boy, an experience that helped develop within him "an active dislike of the abuse of power".

== Career as attorney ==
He took a $60-a-week job with California Rural Legal Assistance, a non-profit legal and political advocacy group that promotes the interests of migrant laborers and the rural poor. One lawsuit he filed against the University of California challenged its practice of promoting farm mechanization research because of the harm it caused to family farms and farm workers.

Hired by the Natural Resources Defense Council in 1981, he became director of its public health program, where he pursued litigation aimed at eliminating the use of certain pesticides. Meyerhoff pursued his effort using an amendment of the Federal Food, Drug, and Cosmetic Act that banned the presence of chemicals that were carcinogenic to animals in processed foods.

Meyerhoff died at age 61 on December 21, 2008, in Los Angeles, where he lived, due to complications of leukemia.
