= Al Eschbach =

American radio personality

Al Eschbach is an American radio personality who has had a radio program on WWLS radio since 1985, with the exception of a brief stint on Kansas City's KCMO-AM in the early 1990s.

== Early life and education ==
Raised in Jersey City, New Jersey, he went to Seton Hall Preparatory School for high school and then University of Oklahoma.

== Career ==
In 1976, he started his career as the sports director at KTOK in Oklahoma City.

== Awards and honors ==
He was inducted into the Oklahoma Journalism Hall of Fame in 2020.
