= Al Blatnik =

American football and basketball coach

Biographical details
- Born: May 2, 1923; Bridgeport, Ohio, U.S.
- Died: February 25, 2011; Wheeling, West Virginia, U.S.
- Education: West Liberty; Pittsburgh; West Virginia

Coaching career (HC unless noted)

Football
- 1959–1961: West Liberty

Basketball
- 1957–1959: West Liberty

Head coaching record
- Overall: 13–12–1 (football); 31–21 (basketball)

Albert Michael Blatnik (May 2, 1923 – February 25, 2011) was an American football and basketball coach. He spent three seasons as the head football coach at West Liberty University, where he compiled a 13–12–1 from 1959 to 1961. He also served as the head basketball coach at West Liberty for the 1957–58 and 1958–59, tallying a mark of a 31–21.

== Head coaching record ==
=== Football ===
Year	Team	Overall	Conference	Standing	Bowl/playoffs
West Liberty Hilltoppers (West Virginia Intercollegiate Athletic Conference) (1959–1961)
1959	West Liberty	4–5	4–3	5th	
1960	West Liberty	2–5–1	2–4–1	7th	
1961	West Liberty	7–2	5–2	2nd (Eastern)	
West Liberty:		13–12–1	11–9–1		
Total:		13–12–1			
