= Al Ghorbanpoor =

Al Ghorbanpoor is a civil engineer and professor emeritus of civil engineering and mechanics at the University of Wisconsin–Milwaukee College of Engineering and Applied Science. He completed his bachelor of science degree in civil engineering at Rezaieh College in Iran in 1974, followed by a master's degree at Howard University in 1979 and a Ph.D. at the University of Maryland, College Park in 1985. He joined the faculty of UW-Milwaukee in 1986, was appointed as a full professor in 1993, and has served as interim dean of the college and as associate dean for research. Ghorbanpoor is a Fellow of the American Society of Civil Engineers
