= Al Fasyimi =

Indonesian footballer

Personal information
- Full name: Al Fasyimi
- Date of birth: 21 July 1998 (age 28)
- Place of birth: Bireuën, Indonesia
- Height: 1.78 m (5 ft 10 in)
- Position: Midfielder

Youth career
- PSSB Bireuen

Senior career*
Years	Team	Apps	(Gls)
2020	Persikota Tangerang	0	(0)
2021	Persiraja Banda Aceh	7	(0)
- * Club domestic league appearances and goals as of 5 December 2021

Al Fasyimi (born 21 July 1998) is an Indonesian professional footballer who plays as a midfielder.

== Club career ==
=== Persiraja Banda Aceh ===
He was signed for Persiraja Banda Aceh to play in Liga 1 in the 2021 season. Fasyimi made his first-team debut on 23 October 2021 as a substitute in a match against Arema at the Maguwoharjo Stadium, Sleman.

== Career statistics ==
=== Club ===
As of 5 December 2021.

Club	Season	League			Cup		Continental		Other		Total	
Club	Season	Division	Apps	Goals	Apps	Goals	Apps	Goals	Apps	Goals	Apps	Goals
Persiraja Banda Aceh	2021	Liga 1	7	0	0	0	–		0	0	7	0
Career total			7	0	0	0	0	0	0	0	7	0
