= Al Martinez =

American writer

- Born: July 21, 1929; Oakland, California
- Died: January 12, 2015 (aged 85); Los Angeles, California
- Occupations: Novelist, journalist
- Writing career
- Notable work: Los Angeles Times columns
- Notable awards: National Headliner Awards and a National Ernie Pyle Award

Al Martinez (July 21, 1929 – January 12, 2015) was a columnist for the Los Angeles Times. He also was known for his writings for several television shows, such as Hawaii Five-O in 1978, the short-lived 1980 police drama B.A.D. Cats, and Out on the Edge, a 1989 television movie starring Rick Schroder. His writings focused mainly on political, health, and social issues within the Latino American community.

== Personal life ==
Al Martinez was born in Oakland, California, to Alfredo and Mary Martinez. When Martinez was five years old, his parents decided to split. At age 20, Martinez married Joanne Cinelli, a fellow San Francisco State graduate. Uniquely, Martinez would refer to his wife simply as "Cinelli" throughout his writings. Shortly after marriage, Martinez joined the Marines. After the Marines, Martinez studied for a short period at University of California Berkeley, but dropped out to work full-time as a writer.

Before working for Los Angeles Times, Martinez, his wife, and kids took a two-month trip around the United States in a camper with their dog Hoover.

Al and Joanne Martinez had three children and six grandchildren together. Martinez died at 85 years old from chronic obstructive pulmonary disease on January 12, 2015. His wife recalled in a statement: "He was really a very sensitive man. Even though he put up a bravado front and could handle almost anything — speaking or whatever he did — there was a little boy inside that often times needed a little comfort and a little attention and that's what I tried to give."

== Career ==
=== Journalism ===
- Richmond Independent 1952-1955
- Oakland Tribune 1955-1972
- Los Angeles Times 1972-2009
- Topanga Messenger 2009-until death
- Los Angeles Daily 2009- until death

=== Marines ===
Martinez enlisted in the Air Force in 1950. From 1950-1952 Martinez served in the Korean War as a rifleman and combat correspondent. Hundreds of Martinez' letters from war eventually surfaced online. Many reviewers theorize these were Martinez's first glimpses of his unique writing style of humor combined with pathos. For example:

“A foxhole isn’t very deep,” he wrote in one letter. “It’s inadequate actually. But in it, you feel the strength of your own protection and the power of your defense.”

=== Early journalism ===
Martinez's first job within the journalism realm was with Richmond Independent in 1952 as a reporter. By 1955, he was working for the Oakland Tribune and writing columns that reflected his humor and perspective on life. However, Martinez grew weary of Oakland and wrote about a particular experience he had while encountering a dog:

"The dog was a pathetic and possibly psychotic no-breed animal named Barney, with beady, close-set eyes and an arrogant attitude. He could have been the love child of an unholy union between Richard Nixon and Bebe Rebozo." —Al Martinez, "Heaven, Hell, and L.A.", in I'll Be Damned If I'll Die in Oakland

In 1972, Martinez was offered a position with the Los Angeles Times. He and his wife relocated to Southern California, where Martinez spent the rest of his journalism career.

=== Los Angeles Times ===
Martinez was most noted for his work in the Los Angeles Times, where he began work in 1972. However, during a major layoff he was let go in 2007. However, he was rehired shortly after. Al Martinez was let go once again in January 2009 when he was 79.

== Bibliography ==
=== Novels ===
- "I’ll Be Damned If I’ll Die in Oakland: A Sort-of Travel Memoir" (2003)
- "The Last City Room" (2000)
- "City of Angles: A Drive-By Portrait of L.A." (1996)
- "Barkley: A Dog's Journey" (2006)

=== Literary criticism ===
- "Ashes in the Rain: Selected Essays" (1989)

=== Other notable works ===
- "Hawaii Five-O", 1978, Writer, Television Series
- "B.A.D. Cats", 1980, Writer, Television Series
- "Out on the Edge", 1989, Writer, Television Series
- JigSaw John, 1976, Writer, Television Series

== Awards and honors ==
Al Martinez contributed to three Pulitzer Prize-winning efforts. Martinez also won a lifetime achievement award from the California Chicano News Media Association in 2002. Martinez also received recognition for his columns by the National Society of Newspaper Columnists and the California Newspaper Publishers Association. Martinez received an Emmy nomination in 1992 for his screenplay writings for "Out on the Edge"

Al Martinez' most notable awards include the National Headliner Awards and a National Ernie Pyle Award.

In 1996, Martinez was awarded an honorary Doctor of Humane Letters (L.H.D.) degree from Whittier College.
