= Al Daff =

Alfred Edward "Al" Daff
- Born: August 2, 1902; North Melbourne, Victoria, Australia
- Died: February 19, 1991 (aged 88); Beverly Hills, Los Angeles, California, USA
- Employer: Universal Pictures
- Spouse: Violet Wardle (married 1930-1938) Opal Petrausch (married 1939-1946) Joan McDonald (married 1948-1955) Annalisa Nilsson (married 1956)

Alfred Edward "Al" Daff (18 August 1902 – 19 Feb 1991) was an Australian born executive who became head of Universal Pictures.

== Biography ==
Daff was born in North Melbourne to Alfred Ernest Daff (1867-1924) and Ruth Shearer (1867-1942).

Al entered motion pictures as office boy at Progressive Films, and worked at night as an assistant projectionist at Moonee Ponds Theatre.

Aged 18 on March 17, 1920, he joined the Melbourne office of Universal Pictures under Dan Casey, general manager in Australasia. In 1922 he took early aerial newsreel footage of New Guinea.

In 1924 he made a 20-minute send-up of wrestling called Who's Who In The Wrestling World - And Why?.

In 1935 he visited the Universal Studios in Hollywood. The following year he was appointed in charge of Universal's Japanese territories; two years after that he became Far East supervisor, then also the Middle East. In 1942 Al became a naturalized U.S. citizen. In 1943 he became Universal Foreign Supervisor, covering all markets outside the US.

In 1949 he became President of Universal International Films, the overseas subsidiary of Universal Pictures Company. In 1952 he became Executive Vice President of Universal Pictures Company, signing a 7-year contract. He retired in 1958 but continued working as a consultant until the 1970s.

Al was married four times. He first married Violet Wardle on 11 Mar 1930 in South Yarra; they divorced in 1938 in Victoria. Violet subsequently married her affair partner Dr. Eric Vio. Al's second marriage was to Opal Petrausch on 1 Jan 1939 in Bombay. They had one daughter and divorced in 1946. His third marriage was to Joan McDonald on 14 July 1948 in Westminster , and they divorced in 1955. Al's fourth marriage was to Annalisa Nilsson on 16 Aug 1956 in Los Angeles.

Al died in Beverly Hills on 19 Feb 1991.

== Media ==
Daff was the topic of a 1975 documentary Al Daff. The documentary consists of Daff being interviewed by Ken G. Hall. He offered advice for Australian filmmakers and reminisced about his own career.

In 1978 he appeared on This is Your Life (ep. 4/038, Al Daff).
