= Al Jones (1940s pitcher) =

American baseball player

- Pitcher
- Batted: Right Threw: Right

Negro league baseball debut
- 1944, for the Chicago American Giants

Last appearance
- 1945, for the Memphis Red Sox

Teams
- Chicago American Giants (1944); Memphis Red Sox (1945)

Albert Alonzo Jones was an American Negro league baseball pitcher who played in the 1940s.

Jones made his Negro leagues debut in 1944 with the Chicago American Giants, and played for the Memphis Red Sox the following season. In nine recorded career games on the mound, he posted a 4.56 ERA over 53.1 innings.
