= Al Hessberg =

American football player (1916–1995)

Albert Hessberg II (June 14, 1916 – January 24, 1995) was an American college football player and lawyer.

At Yale University, Hessberg played track and was the first Jewish standout player on the Yale Bulldogs football team. Hessberg became the first Jewish member of the prestigious secret society Skull and Bones at Yale, at a time when Jews were excluded from such clubs. He graduated in 1938.

He graduated from Yale Law School in 1941. He spent the rest of his life practicing law in Albany, New York, eventually becoming senior partner at Hiscock & Barclay and president of the Albany County Bar Association. He died of cancer at age 78.
