= Al Oster =

Canadian singer (1924–2017)

Albert Adam 'Al' Oster (December 3, 1924 – October 28, 2017) was a Canadian singer known for songs about the Yukon. He was admitted to the Order of Canada in 1999. He lived in the Yukon from 1957 to 1975 and continued to visit it regularly.
