= Al Rankin =

Canadian football player (born 1947)

No. 75 (CGY)
- Position: Wide receiver

Personal information
- Born: c. 1947 (age 78–79)
- Listed height: 6 ft 0 in (1.83 m)
- Listed weight: 202 lb (92 kg)

Career history
- 1969–1970: Saskatchewan Roughriders
- 1970: Calgary Stampeders
- 1972: BC Lions

Awards and highlights
- Grey Cup champion (1971)

Al Rankin (born c. 1947) was a Canadian football player who played for the Calgary Stampeders, Saskatchewan Roughriders and BC Lions. He won the Grey Cup with Calgary in 1971. He played junior football with the Saskatoon Hilltops.
