= Al King =

- Birth name: Alvin K. Smith
- Born: August 8, 1923; Monroe, Louisiana, U.S.
- Died: January 21, 1999 (aged 75); Oakland, California, U.S.
- Genres: Blues
- Occupation(s): Singer, Songwriter
- Years active: 1950s–1990s
- Labels: Shirley, Sahara

Alvin K. Smith (August 8, 1923 – January 21, 1999), who performed and recorded as Al King, was an American blues singer and songwriter.

King was born in Monroe, Louisiana. After moving to Los Angeles he recorded for the Shirley and Sahara labels in the 1950s and 1960s, and had a number 36 US Billboard R&B chart hit in 1966 with "Think Twice Before You Speak". Many of his records featured guitarist and bandleader Johnny Heartsman. He also wrote songs under his real name, Smith, as in "On My Way", the B-side of his first single covering "Reconsider Baby" in 1964.

King died in Oakland, California in January 1999 at the age of 75.
