= Al Kerth =

St. Louis, Missouri, civic leader (1952–2002)

Alfred Henry "Al" Kerth III (January 21, 1952 - September 11, 2002) was a St. Louis civic leader and public relations executive. His projects included bringing the St. Louis Rams NFL team to St. Louis, the St. Louis MetroLink light rail public transit system, St. Louis 2004, Forest Park Forever, the X Prize, Civic Progress, the Scottrade Center, and the Edward Jones Dome. He also served on the boards of numerous civic groups, including the United Way, The Salvation Army, Laumeier Sculpture Park, Area Resources for Community and Human Services, and Forest Park Forever.

== Life ==
Kerth, a member of the fifth generation of the Kerth family of Saint Louis, received a bachelor's degree in economics from the University of Missouri–St. Louis and a master's degree in urban studies from Occidental College in Los Angeles.

From 1977 to 1987, he worked for the former Centerre Bank in public relations, marketing and community affairs. His grandfather, Al Kerth, had founded Chesterfield Bank, which eventually became part of Centerre Bank.

From 1987 to 1998, he was a senior partner at Fleishman-Hillard. The public relations firm's world headquarters is in downtown St. Louis.

From 1989 to 1998, he was secretary to Civic Progress, an influential organization of the area's top business executives. He served as its spokesman and political liaison during negotiations to build the indoor football stadium, the Edward Jones Dome, as well as the new hockey and basketball arena, now known as the Scottrade Center. He also was a key player in the efforts to bring a professional football team to St. Louis after the Cardinals left for Arizona.

From 1998 until his death, he was president and chief executive of The Eads Center. A nonprofit public affairs consultancy he founded, designed to provide strategic counsel to groups that would bolster St. Louis, such as not-for-profit and community organizations.

== Death ==
At the time of his death, former U.S. Sen. John Danforth with whom Mr. Kerth often collaborated on public projects, was quoted as saying: "Al Kerth was St. Louis' most important civic resource ... "He was the person who, first of all, could conceive big ideas for St. Louis. He was also the person who could sell those ideas – to civic leaders, the broader community, to politicians."
