= Al Stubblefield =

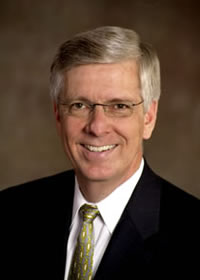
- Al Stubblefield, former president and CEO of Baptist Health Care

Al Stubblefield (Alfred G. Stubblefield) served as president and CEO (1999–2012) of Baptist Health Care (BHC) located in Pensacola, Florida.

== Education ==
Al Stubblefield holds a Master of Science degree from the University of Alabama in Birmingham, Alabama, and earned his bachelor's degree from Mississippi College in Clinton, Mississippi.

== Career ==
Stubblefield began his career in health care administration at hospitals in Mississippi and Tennessee before joining Baptist Health Care's Baptist Hospital in 1985.

In 1995, Stubblefield initiated a cultural transformation at Baptist Health Care that turned around lagging patient and employee satisfaction scores. His efforts subsequently brought about reduced staff turnover rates, increased market share and improved financial performance. Baptist Health Care now is recognized nationally as a leader in patient satisfaction from changes made during Stubblefield's career. Stemming from Baptist Health Care's transformation, Stubblefield also helped start the consulting group of Baptist Leadership Institute (now Baptist Leadership Group) in 2000 as a way for other health care leaders and organizations to learn about the Baptist Health Care culture and how to bring effective change to their own facilities.

Stubblefield inaugurated the corporate training and people development tool, Baptist University, in 1997 when he was executive vice president and COO at Baptist Health Care. Baptist University is only one of several training initiatives launched under Stubblefield.

Under Stubblefield's leadership, Baptist Hospital received the coveted Malcolm Baldrige National Quality Award in 2003. As a well-known leader on health care issues, he is a frequent speaker at conferences throughout the country and is often quoted in national articles. Stubblefield's message focuses on the value of culture development and employee engagement. In 2005, he shared the BHC success story in his book The Baptist Health Care Journey to Excellence; Creating a Culture that Wows.

Stubblefield retired in June 2012 and was succeeded by Chief Operating Officer Mark Faulkner. Stubblefield continues as president emeritus of Baptist Health Care.

== Accomplishments ==
- Author of The Baptist Health Care Journey to Excellence: Creating a Culture that WOWs! ISBN 0-471-70890-9, ISBN 978-0-471-70890-2
- Training Magazine recognized Stubblefield in 2002 as one of eleven "CEO's Who Get It."
- Modern Healthcare Magazine's list of 100 Most Powerful People in Health Care – 2004
- Ethics in Business Award from Combined Rotary Clubs of Pensacola, Florida – 2004
- Award of Honor from American Hospital Association – 2008
- Locally voted as one of the most powerful and influential persons in the greater Pensacola area multiple times.
  - 2009: 19th of 50
  - 2008: 19th of 50
  - 2007: 25th of 50

== Associations ==
Al Stubblefield is associated with many organizations dedicated to improving health care in communities throughout the nation, including:

American Hospital Association

- Member, AHA Board of Trustees 2001–2005
- Member, AHA Executive Committee 2004–2005
- Chair, AHA Regional Policy Board 4, 2000–2005
- Member, AHA PAC Board 2000–2005
- Member, AHA Operations Committee 2000–2005
- Chair, AHA Operations Committee 2004–2005
- Chair, AHA Audit Committee 2002–2003
- Florida State Delegate, AHA Regional Policy Board 4 1997–2000
- Florida State Alternate, AHA Regional Policy Board 4 1996–1997
- Board Liaison to Small and Rural Hospital Constituency Section 2002

Hospital Research and Education Trust (HRET)

- Member, HRET Board of Directors 2003–present
- Chair, HRET Nominating Committee 2005
- Member, HRET Finance Committee 2003 – present
- Chair-Elect HRET Board of 2008

Florida Hospital Association

- Member, Finance Committee
- Chair, Quality Initiatives Committee
- Member, FHA PAC Board
- Member, State Advocacy Committee
- Member, By-Laws Committee

National Committee for Quality in Health Care

- Board of Directors

Association of Community Hospital and Health Systems of Florida

- Chair, Board of Directors 1998
- Member, Board of Directors 1990–1998
- Member, Executive Committee
