= Al Castellanos =

Former Cuban Bandleader of the 1940s and 1950s

Al Castellanos was a Cuban bandleader of the 1940s and 1950s. He was one of the first three acts, with Tito Puente and Tito Rodríguez, to record for Tico Records in New York. In 1955 Castellanos signed a three-year deal with leading New York Latin label Mardi Gras Records and had his first big hit "The Speak-Up Mambo". Castellanos' orchestra was based around the La Playa Sextet.

== Discography ==
- Cha Cha Cha Together 1-2-3, Mardi-Gras Records
- 1956 Cha Cha Cha At The Sahara, Mardi-Gras Records
- 1958 Caras Bonitas
- 1958 Salta Perico
- 1958 Speak Up Mambo, Mardi-Gras Records
- 1966 Pachanga Si And Cha Cha Too, Mardi-Gras Records
- 19?? Mardi gras music for dancing vol. 4
