= Al Jackson (artist) =

American artist and painter (born 1964)

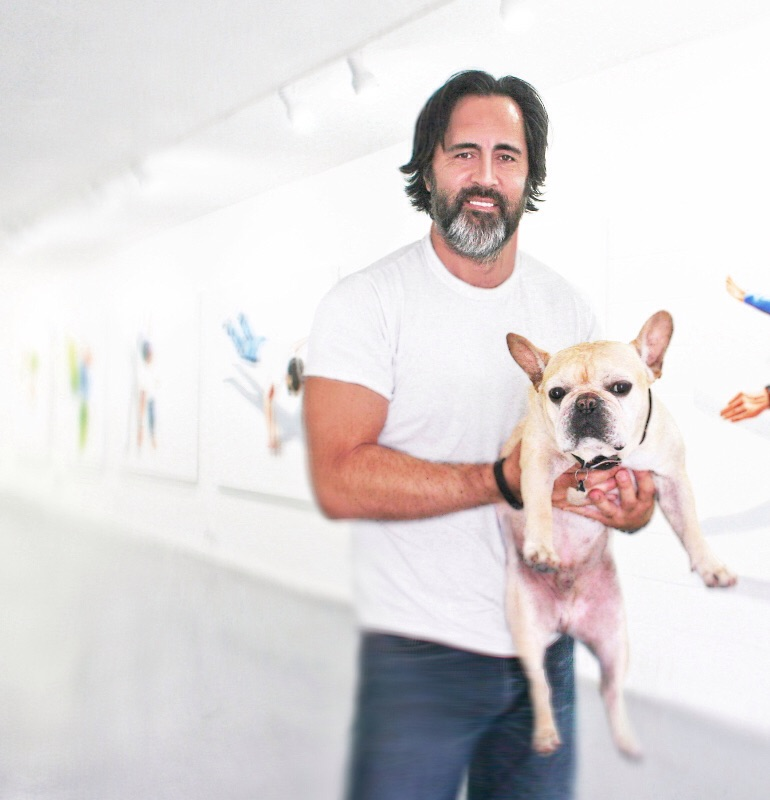
- Jackson in Los Angeles, CA (2014)
- Born: October 5, 1964 (age 61); Carmel, California, US
- Occupations: Artist, Painter
- Style: Contemporary
- Website: aljacksonartist.com

Alwin Jackson (born October 5, 1964) is an American artist and painter currently based in Palm Springs, California. Versed in multiple disciplines of art and design, Jackson has studied and undergone training in Los Angeles, Bangkok, Boston, and Atlanta. His works are collected throughout the U.S. and internationally.

== Early life ==
Jackson was born in Carmel, California and grew up in Pebble Beach. A standout in the fine art program at Stevenson Prep Highschool, Jackson was sent to study painting further at universities prior to high school graduation. He entered the fine art program at Pepperdine University and graduated in 1986, accepting his first job at advertising agency Ogilvy and Mather the same year. Relocating overseas for the position, Jackson was based in Asia where he created ads for Guinness, Pepsi, and other brands. In 1998 he returned to the U.S., designing ads for BBDO Advertising in New York and Atlanta.

== Art career ==
Despite the tenure and success in advertising Jackson stated in interviews to having always been a painter and in 2008, thus affording his departure from advertising design, began to formally sell works. Reviews and media relating to Jackson's work has mentioned influences of Edward Hopper's contrast of light and dark. While, reluctant to emulate other painters, Jackson has admittedly discussed and embraced the comparison to Hopper's play of light and shadow. Contemporary works painted by Jackson have an added modern element based on the composition, thus being the liberal use of negative space along with a style that emulates simplicity and a graphic design quality. When discussing this in interviews and press coverage, Jackson credits such to an advertising designer and mentor, Neil French, whom the artist worked under for five years in advertising.

Publications

- 2012 Artsy Forager / Artist Highlight
- 2012 Ocean Magazine / Art and Design Segment
- 2012 Artslant / Worldwide Artist Highlight
- 2012 Hardbound Volume I / Important World Artists
- 2014 People Magazine / Print pub. July 21, 2014 / Celebrity Homes
- 2015 The Wall Street Journal / October 22, 2015 / "The House that Google Built"
- 2015 Worth Magazine / Print pub. October 3, 2015 / "Power House"

Exhibitions

- 2010 The Detachment Series / Corporate Fine Art Collection at Art Basel / Miami, FL
- 2011–2012 The Detachment Series / Downtown Art Center Gallery / Los Angeles, CA
- 2011 – 2015 U Gallery / Ongoing Solo Exhibition / San Francisco, CA
- 2014 London Hotel / Mercy for Animals benefit exhibit / Hollywood, CA
- 2014 Freight + Volume Gallery / Al Jackson Exhibit / Chelsea District / New York, NY
- 2015 Eastwood Ranch Foundation / Fundraiser exhibition hosted by Billy Zane, Alison VanPelt, Al Jackson / Los Angeles, CA
- 2015 De Re Gallery / Exclusive representation, ongoing solo and group exhibits / Los Angeles, CA
- 2016 De Re Gallery / Fundraiser exhibition hosted by Hilary Swank, Emmy Rossum, Al Jackson, Scott Eastwood, Alison Eastwood for Eastwood Ranch Foundation / Los Angeles, CA
- 2012 – present Jackson Gallery / Ongoing Solo Exhibition / Palm Springs, CA
