= Al Eisenstat =

American lawyer and business executive (born 1930)

Al Eisenstat (born 1930) is a retired American lawyer and business executive. He served as general counsel, Senior Vice President and board member at Apple Computer.

== Career ==
Eisenstat was the co-founder of United Data Centers, which was later sold to Tymshare.

In 1982, Eisenstat was Apple's corporate secretary and vice president of marketing. In 1985 he was vice president of investor relations and also its chief legal officer. During his time with the company, Eisenstat recommended that Apple buy AOL. He also participated in the selection of Michael Spindler as CEO, replacing John Sculley. In 1993 Eisenstat sued Apple for wrongful dismissal.
