= Al Hart =

American radio broadcaster

Al Hart (c. 1927 – January 14, 2016) was a radio broadcaster. He began his career at WOBT in Rhinelander, WI, studied journalism at the University of Minnesota, and spent ten years in television and radio in Shreveport, LA. He moved to the San Francisco Bay Area in 1960 to work as program director of KABL, moved to KNBR in 1965, and to KCBS as a producer for Dave McElhatton in 1966. He became a news anchor in 1968, and began his 24-year run as morning news anchor in 1976.

He rode BART's first Transbay Tube test train on 10 August 1973.

In 2006 he was elected as a charter member of the Bay Area Radio Hall of Fame.
