= Stubblefield, Houston County, Texas =

Stubblefield, Texas
- Unincorporated community
- Location within Texas Location within the United States
- Coordinates: 31°18′52″N 95°6′36″W
- Country: United States
- State: Texas
- County: Houston
- Elevation: 285 ft (87 m)
- Time zone: UTC-6 (Central (CST))
  - Summer (DST): UTC-5 (CDT)
- Area codes: 430 & 903
- GNIS feature ID: 1388221

Stubblefield is an unincorporated community in Houston County, Texas, United States. According to the Handbook of Texas, the community had a population of 15 in 2000.

== History ==
Stubblefield was named after local resident Wyatt Stubblefield. It was completely abandoned by 1930, save a few widely scattered houses and a cemetery. The 2000 population estimate is 15.

== Geography ==
Stubblefield is located on Farm to Market Road 2781, four miles south of Kennard in southeastern Houston County.

== Education ==
The community's school was established in the 1880s. Wyatt Stubblefield donated land to move the school to a better location. In 1897, the enrollment of the school was 26.

Students who live in Stubblefield are zoned to the Kennard Independent School District.
