= Arizona Cardinals all-time roster (A–Kin) =

2,146 players have appeared in at least one regular season or postseason game in the National Football League (NFL) for the Arizona Cardinals franchise since 1920. This list includes those whose last names fall between "A" and "Kin". For the rest, see Arizona Cardinals all-time roster (Kir–Z). This list is accurate through the end of the 2025 NFL season.

== A ==
- Hamza Abdullah
- Oday Aboushi
- John Abraham
- Sam Acho
- Bill Acker
- Henry Adams
- Isaiah Adams
- Michael Adams (born 1964)
- Michael Adams (born 1985)
- Sam Agee
- Dave Ahrens
- Sergio Albert
- Art Albrecht
- Bryson Albright
- Ki Aldrich
- Melvin Aldridge
- Brent Alexander
- Lorenzo Alexander
- Mike Alford
- Robert Alford
- Carl Allen
- Ed Allen
- Ian Allen
- Jeff Allen
- Zach Allen
- Kurt Allerman
- Hank Allison
- Joe Allton
- Steve Alvord
- David Amerson
- Matt Ammendola
- Charlie Anderson
- Cliff Anderson
- Damien Anderson
- Derek Anderson
- Donny Anderson
- Dwayne Anderson
- Eddie Anderson
- Ottis Anderson
- Ronnie Anderson
- Stephen Anderson
- Stevie Anderson
- Taz Anderson
- Warren Anderson
- Plato Andros
- Elmer Angsman
- Terrence Anthony
- Ray Apolskis
- Evan Arapostathis
- Javier Arenas
- Thurston Armbrister
- Loyd Arms
- Mark Arneson
- Dan Arnold
- J. J. Arrington
- Elmer Arterburn
- Josh Ashton
- Bob Atkins
- Jess Atkinson
- Dan Audick
- Kent Austin
- Rob Awalt
- Obafemi Ayanbadejo

== B ==
- Al Babartsky
- Jason Babin
- Andre Baccellia
- John Badaczewski
- Brad Badger
- Ed Bagdon
- Johnny Bailey
- Markus Bailey
- Monk Bailey
- Rodney Bailey
- Al Baker
- Budda Baker
- Bullet Baker
- Charles Baker
- Conway Baker
- Tony Baker
- Jim Bakken
- Frank Balazs
- Jake Ballard
- Chris Banjo
- Eric Banks
- Jason Banks
- Mike Banks
- Tom Banks
- Michael Bankston
- Vince Banonis
- John Barefield
- Joe Barksdale
- Khalif Barnes
- Krys Barnes
- Larry Barnes
- Mike Barnes
- Pete Barnes
- Roy Barni
- Mike Barr
- David Barrett
- Sebastian Barrie
- Norman Barry
- Paul Barry
- Richard Bartel
- Jared Bartlett
- Jackson Barton
- Joplo Bartu
- Mario Bates
- Ted Bates
- D'Anthony Batiste
- Greg Baty
- De'Vante Bausby
- Jim Bausch
- David Bavaro
- Rob Baxley
- Jarrod Baxter
- Martin Bayless
- Evan Baylis
- Craig Baynham
- Pat Beach
- Kelvin Beachum
- Norm Beal
- Pete Beathard
- Chuck Beatty
- Al Beauchamp
- Anthony Becht
- Tom Beckman
- Vance Bedford
- Ed Beinor
- Monty Beisel
- Bunny Belden
- Anthony Bell
- Bob Bell
- Gordon Bell
- Marcus Bell
- Mark Bell
- Yeremiah Bell
- Willie Belton
- Marcus Benard
- Eno Benjamin
- Chuck Bennett
- Tommy Bennett
- Trey Benson
- Bené Benwikere
- Adam Bergen
- Mitch Berger
- Gil Bergerson
- Scott Bergold
- Frank Bernardi
- Joy Berquist
- Bertrand Berry
- Gil Berry
- Libero Bertagnolli
- Don Bessillieu
- Antoine Bethea
- Justin Bethel
- Steve Beuerlein
- Tom Bienemann
- Troy Bienemann
- Keishawn Bierria
- Jonathan Bilbo
- Steve Bird
- Carl Birdsong
- Keith Birlem
- Tim Black
- Bill Blackburn
- Angelo Blackson
- Darryl Blackstock
- Hal Blackwell
- Stanley Blair
- Jeff Blake
- Cary Blanchard
- Rodrigo Blankenship
- Tony Blazine
- Homer Bliss
- David Blough
- Eric Blount
- Joey Blount
- Herbert Blumer
- Joe Bock
- Wayne Bock
- Ping Bodie
- Evan Boehm
- Taylor Boggs
- George Bogue
- Frank Bohlmann
- Ron Bohm
- Novo Bojovic
- Anquan Boldin
- Ernie Bonelli
- Alex Boone
- Clarence Booth
- John Booty
- Breon Borders
- Jarvis Borum
- Cap Boso
- Joe Bostic
- David Boston
- Tre Boston
- Kevin Bouie
- Tony Bova
- Andy Bowers
- Bill Boyd
- Kris Boyd
- Max Boydston
- Garland Boyette
- David Braden
- Ronnie Bradford
- Sam Bradford
- Bill Bradley
- Dave Bradley
- Hal Bradley
- Harold Bradley Sr.
- Hunter Bradley
- Melvin Bradley
- Stewart Bradley
- Tom Brahaney
- Chuck Braidwood
- George Brancato
- Alan Branch
- Tyvon Branch
- Michael Brandon
- David Braxton
- Steve Breaston
- Bill Bredde
- Willis Brennan
- Jeep Brett
- Carl Brettschneider
- Aaron Brewer
- Jeremy Bridges
- Mike Brim
- Beau Brinkley
- Jasper Brinkley
- Jacoby Brissett
- Earl Britton
- Fred Brock
- Tramaine Brock
- John Bronson
- Cariel Brooks
- Carlos Brooks
- Ethan Brooks
- Jalen Brooks
- Jon Brooks
- Leo Brooks
- Al Brosky
- Chad Brown
- Chuck Brown
- Dave Brown
- Derek Brown
- Elton Brown
- Evan Brown
- Hardy Brown
- Ivory Lee Brown
- J. B. Brown
- Jaron Brown
- John Brown
- Lance Brown
- Levi Brown
- Lomas Brown
- Marquise Brown
- Miles Brown
- Milford Brown
- Pharaoh Brown
- Ralph Brown
- Ray Brown
- Robert Brown
- Ron Brown
- Rush Brown
- Terry Brown
- Theotis Brown
- Baron Browning
- Dick Brubaker
- Les Bruckner
- Don Brumm
- Scott Brunner
- Johnny Bryan
- Charlie Bryant
- Christian Bryant
- Chuck Bryant
- Red Bryant
- Wendell Bryant
- Deone Bucannon
- Mike Buck
- Garland Buckeye
- Ted Bucklin
- Bob Buczkowski
- Tony Buford
- Joe Bukant
- Chet Bulger
- Jonathan Bullard
- Tim Bulman
- Jordan Burch
- Anthony Burke
- Denzel Burke
- Tom Burke
- Jeff Burkett
- Alex Burl
- Raymond Burnett
- Victor Burnett
- Leon Burns
- Jimmy Burson
- Ron Burton
- Steve Bush
- Ray Busler
- Jim Butler
- Crezdon Butler
- Drew Butler
- Johnny Butler
- Kevin Butler
- Eddie Butts
- Dave Butz
- Josh Bynes
- Damiere Byrd
- LaRon Byrd

== C ==
- Ronnie Cahill
- J. V. Cain
- Jim Cain
- Mike Caldwell
- Rich Camarillo
- Al Campana
- Bill Campbell
- Calais Campbell
- De'Vondre Campbell
- Mark Campbell
- Kameron Canaday
- Leo Cantor
- Rolando Cantú
- Joe Carey
- Hal Carlson
- John Carlson
- Steve Carpenter
- Jimmy Carr
- Lydell Carr
- Duane Carrell
- Glenn Carson
- Carl Carter
- David Carter
- Dyshod Carter
- Jimmie Carter
- Joe Carter
- Michael Carter
- Pat Carter
- Ross Carter
- Willie Carter
- Zachary Carter
- Stoney Case
- Antoine Cason
- Tim Castille
- Chandler Catanzaro
- Greg Cater
- Les Caywood
- Chuck Cecil
- Oliver Celestin
- Larry Centers
- Andre Chachere
- Guy Chamberlin
- Al Chandler
- Chris Chandler
- Leo Chappell
- Dick Chapura
- Len Charpier
- Corey Chavous
- Lloyd Cheatham
- Ed Cherry
- Nick Chickillo
- Joe Childress
- Jimmy Childs
- Gene Chilton
- Dan Chisena
- Andy Chisick
- Robbie Chosen
- Marty Christiansen
- Paul Christman
- Ryan Christopherson
- Ben Ciccone
- Kendrick Clancy
- Sean Clancy
- Beryl Clark
- Bill Clark
- Charlie Clark
- Ernie Clark
- Gary Clark
- Jessie Clark
- Jon Clark
- Kei'Trel Clark
- Randy Clark
- Bob Clasby
- Corwin Clatt
- Blaine Clausell
- Ben Claxton
- Charles Clay
- Ralph Claypool
- Ralph Clayton
- Anthony Clement
- Corey Clement
- Johnny Clement
- Chris Clemons
- Tom Cobb
- Lyron Cobbins
- Antonio Cochran
- Red Cochran
- Ron Coder
- Mac Cody
- Pat Coffee
- Rondy Colbert
- Mason Cole
- Ben Coleman
- Derrick Coleman
- Sidney Coleman
- Trevon Coley
- Jake Colhouer
- Daryn Colledge
- L. J. Collier
- Tim Collier
- Clarence Collins
- George Collins
- Paul Collins
- Zaven Collins
- Trystan Colon
- Chris Combs
- Ogden Compton
- Steve Conley
- Ward Connell
- Hayden Conner
- James Conner
- Zuehl Conoly
- Bobby Joe Conrad
- Sean Considine
- Dave Cook
- Ed Cook
- Joe Coomer
- Nolan Cooney
- Chris Cooper
- Jonathan Cooper
- Marcus Cooper
- Pharoh Cooper
- Al Coppage
- Don Cosner
- Barney Cotton
- Rashaad Coward
- Gerard Cowhig
- Michael Crabtree
- Joe Crakes
- Jack Crangle
- Bill Crass
- Kitan Crawford
- Milan Creighton
- Willis Crenshaw
- Kirby Criswell
- Jack Crittendon
- Antonio Cromartie
- Larry Croom
- Billy Cross
- Bobby Cross
- John David Crow
- Lindon Crow
- Earl Crowder
- Bob Crum
- Dwayne Crump
- Ward Cuff
- Ed Culpepper
- Ed Cunningham
- Korey Cunningham
- Rick Cunningham
- Gary Cuozzo
- Bree Cuppoletti
- Tony Curcillo
- Jake Curhan
- Harry Curran
- Herschel Currie
- Don Currivan
- Clarence Curry
- Travis Curtis
- Harry Curzon

== D ==
- Jerry Daanen
- Bill Daddio
- Bernard Dafney
- Tom Dahms
- Dennis Daley
- DeeJay Dallas
- Darrell Daniels
- Jerome Daniels
- Karlos Dansby
- Matt Darby
- Ramsey Dardar
- James Darling
- Norberto Davidds-Garrido
- Joe Davidson
- Bill Davis
- Billy Davis
- Charlie Davis
- Dexter Davis
- Greg Davis
- Hermit Davis
- Jaden Davis
- Jalen Davis
- Jerry Davis
- Leonard Davis
- Paul Davis
- Reuben Davis
- Ron Davis
- Russell Davis
- Wayne Davis
- Will Davis
- Wyatt Davis
- Akeem Davis-Gaither
- Doug Dawson
- Mike Dawson
- Phil Dawson
- Tom Day
- Bill DeCorrevont
- Allen DeGraffenreid
- Josiah Deguara
- Al Del Greco
- Burt Delavan
- Bob DeMarco
- Kenny Demens
- Emari Demercado
- Versil Deskin
- Fred DeStefano
- Chuck Detwiler
- Seth DeValve
- Mike Devlin
- Billy Dewell
- James Dexter
- Lorenzo Diamond
- Rick DiBernardo
- Paul Dickson
- Charlie Diehl
- Dan Dierdorf
- Scott Dill
- Babe Dimancheff
- Victor Dimukeje
- Chris Dishman
- John Dittrich
- Joshua Dobbs
- Conrad Dobler
- Darnell Dockett
- Michael Dogbe
- Bill Donckers
- Jack Doolan
- Vontarrius Dora
- Andy Dorris
- Greg Dortch
- Early Doucet
- Forrest Douds
- Phil Dougherty
- Bob Dove
- Marcus Dowdell
- Mule Dowell
- Pat Dowling
- Michael Downs
- Ted Doyle
- Jerry Drake
- Kenyan Drake
- Jim Dray
- Justin Drescher
- Paddy Driscoll
- Joe Driskill
- Al Drulis
- Mark Duda
- Dave Duerson
- Len Dugan
- Gil Duggan
- Herb Duggins
- Jamie Dukes
- Gary Dulin
- Karl Dunbar
- Clyde Duncan
- Tim Duncan
- Bobby Duncum
- Red Dunn
- Moose Dunstan
- Malachi Dupre
- Clarence Duren
- John Durko
- Jonathan Dwyer
- Ernest Dye
- Keilen Dykes

== E ==
- Nick Eason
- Nijrell Eason
- Tracey Eaton
- Ray Ebli
- Fate Echols
- Bob Eckl
- Chase Edmonds
- Anthony Edwards
- Cid Edwards
- Eric Edwards
- Dick Egan
- Doug Eggers
- Virgil Eikenberg
- Jim Eliopulos
- Chief Elkins
- Ev Elkins
- Andre Ellington
- Dante Ellington
- Walt Ellis
- Swede Ellstrom
- Charley Ellzey
- Jack Elwell
- Mel Embree
- Vern Emerson
- Paul Engebretsen
- Eric England
- Steve Enich
- Hal Erickson
- Mickey Erickson
- Zach Ertz
- Boomer Esiason
- Clarence Esser
- Sam Etcheverry
- Tim Euhus
- Dick Evans
- Earl Evans
- Scott Evans

== F ==
- Fred Failing
- Richard Fain
- Paul Fanaika
- Alan Faneca
- Chad Fann
- Ledio Fanucchi
- Ted Farmer
- Miller Farr
- Mario Fatafehi
- Jeff Faulkner
- George Faust
- Calvin Favron
- Jeff Feagles
- Tavien Feaster
- Jay Feely
- Simi Fehoko
- Darren Fells
- Earl Ferrell
- Diamond Ferri
- Lou Ferry
- Amod Field
- Doak Field
- Harry Field
- Ralph Fife
- John Fina
- Bernie Finn
- Roger Finnie
- Tom Finnin
- Bill Fischer
- Pat Fischer
- Ev Fisher
- Levar Fisher
- Mike Fisher
- Kylie Fitts
- Larry Fitzgerald
- Paul Fitzgibbon
- Terrence Flagler
- Latham Flanagan
- Jamell Fleming
- Mack Flenniken
- Paul Florence
- Eric Floyd
- John Floyd
- Michael Floyd
- James Folston
- Art Folz
- Larry Foote
- Cody Ford
- Rudy Ford
- Phil Forney
- William Fortune
- D. J. Foster
- Larry Foster
- Ralph Foster
- Leki Fotu
- Chas Fox
- Gene Francis
- Aaron Francisco
- Rob Fredrickson
- Dwight Freeney
- Ernie Fritsch
- Hjalte Froholdt
- Josh Fryar
- Alani Fua
- Dick Fugler
- Frank Fuller
- Larry Fuller

== G ==
- Blaine Gabbert
- Lamont Gaillard
- Jon Gaines
- Wendall Gaines
- Charlie Gainor
- Jim Gallery
- David Galloway
- Billy Gambrell
- Mike Gandy
- Mark Garalczyk
- Frank Garcia
- Max Garcia
- Dennis Gardeck
- Chris Garlich
- Sammy Garza
- Joe Gasparella
- Curtis Gatewood
- Prentice Gautt
- Bill Gay
- William Gay
- Chris Gedney
- Fred Gehrke
- Stan Gelbaugh
- Steve George
- Joe Geri
- Jim German
- Carl Gersbach
- Vern Ghersanich
- Robert Giblin
- Mike Gibson
- Freddie Gilbert
- George Gilchrist
- Randy Gill
- John Gillen
- Walker Gillette
- John Gilliam
- Fred Gillies
- Blake Gillikin
- Don Gillis
- Bryan Gilmore
- Ted Ginn Jr.
- Willis Glassgow
- Mike Glennon
- Fred Glick
- Les Goble
- Marshall Goldberg
- Brittan Golden
- Markus Golden
- Zack Golditch
- Sam Goldman
- John Goldsberry
- Zane Gonzalez
- Irv Goode
- John Goode
- Zaviar Gooden
- Anthony Goodlow
- Aubrey Goodman
- Don Goodman
- Mark Goodspeed
- C. J. Goodwin
- Bobby Gordon
- Lou Gordon
- Jason Goss
- Colby Gossett
- Steven Grace
- Aaron Graham
- Al Graham
- Ben Graham
- Kent Graham
- Bill Gramatica
- Charley Granger
- Ducky Grant
- Cecil Gray
- Earnest Gray
- Ken Gray
- Mel Gray
- Tim Gray
- A. J. Green
- Eric Green
- Marshay Green
- Roy Green
- Doug Greene
- Ed Greene
- Frank Greene
- Ken Greene
- Curtis Greer
- Chris Greisen
- Jermaine Gresham
- Marion Grice
- Bob Griffin
- Jeff Griffin
- Homer Griffith
- Robert Griffith
- John Grigas
- Jerry Groom
- Elois Grooms
- George Grosvenor
- Quentin Groves
- Kamu Grugier-Hill
- Mike Gruttadauria
- Ralph Guglielmi
- Kevin Guidry
- Rodney Gunter
- Thomas Guynes

== H ==
- Matt Haack
- Adam Haayer
- Dale Hackbart
- Gary Hadd
- Rex Hadnot
- Clark Haggans
- Carl Hairston
- Nate Hairston
- Darren Hall
- Johnny Hall
- Ken Hall
- Max Hall
- Shawn Halloran
- Bernie Halstrom
- Troy Hambrick
- Antonio Hamilton
- Lawrence Hamilton
- Mal Hammack
- Gary Hammond
- Phil Handler
- Carl Hanke
- Bob Hanlon
- Cliff Hansen
- Homer Hanson
- Pat Harder
- Darryl Hardy
- Jim Hardy
- Terry Hardy
- Jim Hargrove
- Sean Harlow
- Ham Harmon
- Willard Harrell
- Perry Harrington
- Bob Harris
- Demetrius Harris
- Ike Harris
- Kenny Harris
- Odie Harris
- Quentin Harris
- William Harris
- Marvin Harrison Jr.
- Reggie Harrison
- Jim Hart
- Lawrence Hart
- Trevon Hartfield
- Greg Hartle
- George Hartong
- Larry Hartshorn
- Frank Harvey
- Ken Harvey
- Tim Hasselbeck
- Johnny Hatley
- Art Hauser
- Leo Hayden
- Gerald Hayes
- Jarius Hayes
- Chip Healy
- Todd Heap
- Garrison Hearst
- Don Heater
- Charlie Heck
- Robert Hecker
- Victor Heflin
- Jimmy Heidel
- Brian Henesey
- Ed Henke
- Jerry Hennessy
- Marcus Henry
- Steve Henry
- Will Hernandez
- Fred Heron
- Larry Hickman
- Jordan Hicks
- Elijah Higgins
- J. B. Higgins
- Tom Higgins
- Mark Higgs
- Ali Highsmith
- Tim Hightower
- Bronson Hill
- Don Hill
- Eric Hill
- Irv Hill
- Jimmy Hill
- King Hill
- Randal Hill
- Renaldo Hill
- Trysten Hill
- Jerry Hillebrand
- Curly Hinchman
- Terry Hoage
- Liffort Hobley
- Victor Hobson
- John Hock
- Nathan Hodel
- Gerald Hodges
- James Hodgins
- Bob Hoel
- George Hoey
- John Hoffman
- Paul Hogan
- Tom Hogan
- Gary Hogeboom
- Doug Hogland
- Murrell Hogue
- Will Holden
- Carlyle Holiday
- Vonnie Holliday
- Johnny Holloway
- Randy Holloway
- Tony Holm
- Scott Holman
- Walt Holmer
- Don Holmes
- Gabe Holmes
- Lester Holmes
- Terrence Holt
- Roderick Hood
- DeAndre Hopkins
- Greg Horne
- Roy Horstmann
- Arnold Horween
- Ralph Horween
- Phil Hoskins
- Jerry Houghton
- John Houser
- Rob Housler
- Thomas Howard Sr.
- Ty Howard
- Brian Hoyer
- Rodney Hudson
- Orlando Huff
- Frank Huffman
- Bernie Hughes
- Robert Hughes
- Van Hughes
- George Hultz
- Swede Hummell
- Buddy Humphrey
- D. J. Humphries
- Brett Hundley
- Ricky Hunley
- Darrell Hunter
- Monty Hunter
- Patrick Hunter
- John Hurlburt
- Ed Husmann
- Al Hust
- Chuck Hutchison
- Fred Hyatt
- Steve Hyche

== I ==
- Ted Illman
- Martin Imhof
- Keaontay Ingram
- Isaiah Irving
- Terry Irving
- Ted Isaacson
- Andy Isabella
- Danny Isidora
- Keith Ismael
- Jabari Issa
- Mike Iupati
- Pop Ivy
- Kenny Iwebema
- George Izo

== J ==
- Chris Jacke
- Arnold Jackson
- Charlie Jackson
- Dexter Jackson
- James Jackson
- John Jackson
- Josh Jackson
- Mark Jackson
- Roland Jackson
- Demontrey Jacobs
- Marv Jacobs
- Harry Jagielski
- Edgerrin James
- Keever Jankovich
- Ilia Jarostchuk
- Garth Jax
- A. J. Jefferson
- D. C. Jefferson
- Jermar Jefferson
- Tony Jefferson
- Tony Jeffery
- MarTay Jenkins
- Jack Jennings
- Leon Joe
- Ulrick John
- Al Johnson
- Bert Johnson
- Bobby Johnson
- Brandon Johnson (linebacker)
- Bryant Johnson
- Charles Johnson
- Charley Johnson
- Chris Johnson
- Chuckie Johnson
- D. J. Johnson
- D'Ernest Johnson
- David Johnson
- Dennis Johnson
- Dirk Johnson
- Eric Johnson
- Gregg Johnson
- Jaymar Johnson
- Jerome Johnson
- Johnny Johnson
- KeeSean Johnson
- Leonard Johnson
- LeShon Johnson
- Paris Johnson Jr.
- Rashad Johnson
- Ray Johnson
- Teyo Johnson
- Troy Johnson
- Will Johnson
- Jimmy Johnston
- Swede Johnston
- Ben Jones
- Chandler Jones
- Chris Jones
- Christian Jones
- Elijah Jones
- Ernie Jones
- Freddie Jones
- Greg Jones
- Jock Jones
- Josh Jones
- Justin Jones
- Manny Jones
- Mike Jones
- Naquan Jones
- Onrea Jones
- Steve Jones
- Thomas Jones
- Tony Jones
- Tony Jones Jr.
- Tyrone Jones
- Zay Jones
- Kevin Jordan
- Tony Jordan
- Tim Jorden
- Johnathan Joseph
- Don Joyce
- Matt Joyce
- Terry Joyce
- Seth Joyner
- Bhawoh Jue
- E. J. Junior
- Trey Junkin

== Ka-Kin ==
- Johnny Karras
- Jack Karwales
- Kevin Kasper
- Dick Kasperek
- Chuck Kassel
- Kani Kauahi
- Bill Kay
- Tom Keane
- Tim Kearney
- Tom Kearns
- Thomas Keiser
- Brandon Keith
- Gary Keithley
- Senio Kelemete
- Lyons Kelliher
- Bobby Kellogg
- Clarence Kellogg
- Marv Kellum
- Tommy Kelly
- Pete Kendall
- Derek Kennard
- Devon Kennard
- George Kenneally
- Zach Kerr
- Bob Keseday
- Brady Keys
- Isaac Keys
- Walt Kichefski
- Howard Kieley
- Walt Kiesling
- Roger Kiley
- Greg Kindle
- George Kinek
- Corey Kiner
- Emmett King
- Jeff King
- Kenny King
- Rip King
- Shaun King
- Ellsworth Kingery
