= List of NFL players (Ba–Boni) =

This is a list of players who have appeared in at least one regular season or postseason game in the National Football League (NFL), American Football League (AFL), or All-America Football Conference (AAFC) and have a last name that falls between "Ba" and "Boni". For the rest of the B's, see list of NFL players (Bonn–By). This list is accurate through the end of the 2025 NFL season.

== Baa–Bal ==
- Mike Baab
- Steve Baack
- David Baas
- Al Babartsky
- Charlie Babb
- Gene Babb
- Harry Babcock
- Sam Babcock
- Billy Baber
- Rod Babers
- Bob Babich
- Jason Babin
- Jonathan Babineaux
- Jordan Babineaux
- John Babinecz
- Jeff Baca
- Martin Baccaglio
- Andre Baccellia
- Carl Bacchus
- Joe Bachie
- Joe Bachmaier
- Alex Bachman
- Jay Bachman
- Ted Bachman
- Rip Bachor
- Kennard Backman
- Backnor
- Jeff Backus
- Coy Bacon
- Francis Bacon
- Waine Bacon
- David Bada
- John Badaczewski
- Rick Badanjek
- Rich Badar
- Johnson Bademosi
- Jeff Badet
- Brad Badger
- Michael Badgley
- Red Badgro
- Tyler Badie
- Steve Bagarus
- Herm Bagby
- Ed Bagdon
- Tyson Bagent
- Billy Baggett
- Curt Baham
- Leonard Bahan
- Ken Bahnsen
- Chris Bahr
- Matt Bahr
- Aaron Bailey
- Allen Bailey
- Alvin Bailey
- Bill Bailey
- Boss Bailey
- Byron Bailey
- Carlton Bailey
- Champ Bailey
- Clarence Bailey
- Dan Bailey
- David Bailey
- Dion Bailey
- Don Bailey
- Edwin Bailey
- Elmer Bailey
- Eric Bailey
- Harold Bailey
- Henry Bailey
- Howard Bailey
- Jake Bailey
- Jim Bailey (born 1927)
- Jim Bailey (born 1948)
- Johnny Bailey
- Karsten Bailey
- Larry Bailey
- Levelle Bailey
- Mark Bailey
- Markus Bailey
- Monk Bailey
- Patrick Bailey
- Quinn Bailey
- Robert Bailey
- Rodney Bailey
- Russ Bailey
- Stacey Bailey
- Stedman Bailey
- Teddy Bailey
- Thomas Bailey
- Tom Bailey
- Victor Bailey
- Zack Bailey
- Bill Bain
- Brandon Bair
- Bill Baird
- Al Baisi
- Billy Bajema
- Al Baker
- Art Baker
- Budda Baker
- Bullet Baker
- Charles Baker
- Chase Baker
- Chris Baker (born 1979)
- Chris Baker (born 1987)
- Conway Baker
- Dallas Baker
- Darrell Baker Jr.
- Dave Baker
- Deandre Baker
- Ed Baker
- Edwin Baker
- Eugene Baker
- Frank Baker
- Jason Baker
- Javon Baker
- Jerome Baker
- Jerry Baker
- Jesse Baker
- John Baker (born 1935)
- John Baker (born 1942)
- John Baker (born 1977)
- Johnny Baker
- Jon Baker (born 1923)
- Jon Baker (born 1972)
- Josh Baker
- Kawaan Baker
- Keith Baker
- Larry Baker
- Melvin Baker
- Myron Baker
- Ralph Baker
- Rashad Baker
- Robert Baker
- Ron Baker
- Ryan Baker
- Sam Baker (born 1930)
- Sam Baker (born 1985)
- Sean Baker
- Shannon Baker
- Stephen Baker
- Terry Baker
- Tim Baker
- Tony Baker (born 1945)
- Tony Baker (born 1964)
- Wayne Baker
- David Bakhtiari
- Eric Bakhtiari
- Jim Bakken
- Zach Bako-Bewele
- Ed Balatti
- Frank Balazs
- Lou Baldacci
- Mike Baldassin
- Brian Baldinger
- Gary Baldinger
- Rich Baldinger
- Karl Baldischwiler
- Daniel Baldridge
- Alex Balducci
- Al Baldwin
- Bob Baldwin
- Burr Baldwin
- Cliff Baldwin
- Daylen Baldwin
- Don Baldwin
- Doug Baldwin
- Ervin Baldwin
- George Baldwin
- Jack Baldwin
- Johnathan Baldwin
- Johnny Baldwin
- Jon Baldwin
- Keith Baldwin
- Randy Baldwin
- Tom Baldwin
- Alan Ball
- Dave Ball
- Eric Ball
- Jason Ball
- Jerry Ball
- Josh Ball
- Lance Ball
- Larry Ball
- Marcus Ball
- Michael Ball
- Montee Ball
- Neiron Ball
- Sam Ball
- Kalen Ballage
- Pat Ballage
- Christian Ballard
- Howard Ballard
- Jake Ballard
- Quinton Ballard
- Vick Ballard
- Corey Ballentine
- Lonnie Ballentine
- Gary Ballman
- Mike Ballou
- Kentwan Balmer
- Bob Balog
- Mike Balogun
- Vic Baltzell

== Ban–Baro ==
- Steve Banas
- John Banaszak
- Pete Banaszak
- Cas Banaszek
- Hugh Bancroft
- Romeo Bandison
- Bruno Banducci
- John Bandura
- Don Bandy
- Michael Bandy
- Joey Banes
- Herb Banet
- Tony Banfield
- Benton Bangs
- Emil Banjavic
- Chris Banjo
- Ted Banker
- Aaron Banks
- Antonio Banks
- Brandon Banks (born 1987)
- Brandon Banks (born 1994)
- Brant Banks
- Carl Banks
- Chip Banks
- Chris Banks
- Chuck Banks
- Deonte Banks
- Eric Banks
- Estes Banks
- Fred Banks
- Gary Banks
- Gordon Banks
- Jason Banks
- Johnthan Banks
- Kelvin Banks Jr.
- Keshawn Banks
- Marcus Banks
- Mike Banks
- Robert Banks
- Roy Banks
- Tavian Banks
- Tom Banks
- Tony Banks
- Willie Banks
- Michael Bankston
- Warren Bankston
- Justin Bannan
- Zach Banner
- Alex Bannister
- Bruce Bannon
- Ben Banogu
- Vince Banonis
- Al Bansavage
- Bradford Banta
- Jack Banta
- Tully Banta-Cain
- Joe Banyard
- Gary Barbaro
- Roland Barbay
- Joe Barbee
- Ben Barber
- Bob Barber
- Chris Barber
- Dominique Barber
- Ernie Barber
- Jim Barber
- Kantroy Barber
- Kurt Barber
- Marion Barber Jr.
- Marion Barber III
- Mark Barber
- Michael Barber
- Mike Barber (born 1953)
- Mike Barber (born 1971)
- Peyton Barber
- Ricky Barber
- Ronde Barber
- Rudy Barber
- Shawn Barber
- Stew Barber
- Tiki Barber
- Pete Barbolak
- Elmer Barbour
- Allen Barbre
- Chris Barclay
- Don Barclay
- Luq Barcoo
- Brandon Barden
- Ramses Barden
- John Barefield
- Ken Barefoot
- Ken Barfield
- Jake Bargas
- Adrian Baril
- Bryce Baringer
- Carl Barisich
- Bryan Barker
- Chris Barker
- Dick Barker
- Ed Barker
- Hub Barker
- Leo Barker
- Roy Barker
- Tony Barker
- Will Barker
- Matt Barkley
- Saquon Barkley
- Ralph Barkman
- Joe Barksdale
- Rashad Barksdale
- Rod Barksdale
- Jerome Barkum
- Lou Barle
- Corey Barlow
- Kevan Barlow
- Reggie Barlow
- Christian Barmore
- George Barna
- Brooks Barnard
- Charles Barnard
- Tom Barndt
- AJ Barner
- Kenjon Barner
- Adairius Barnes
- Al Barnes
- Antwan Barnes
- Benny Barnes
- Billy Ray Barnes
- Brandon Barnes
- Bruce Barnes
- Charley Barnes
- Darian Barnes
- Derrick Barnes (born 1974)
- Derrick Barnes (born 1999)
- Earnest Barnes
- Emery Barnes
- Erich Barnes
- Ernie Barnes
- Gary Barnes
- Jeff Barnes
- Joe Barnes
- Johnnie Barnes
- Kalon Barnes
- Kevin Barnes
- Khalif Barnes
- Krys Barnes
- Larry Barnes (born 1931)
- Larry Barnes (born 1954)
- Lew Barnes
- Lionel Barnes
- Marlon Barnes
- Mike Barnes (born 1944)
- Mike Barnes (born 1950)
- Pat Barnes
- Pete Barnes
- Rashidi Barnes
- Reggie Barnes
- Rodrigo Barnes
- Roosevelt Barnes
- T. J. Barnes
- Tavaris Barnes
- Tim Barnes
- Tomur Barnes
- Walt Barnes (born 1918)
- Walt Barnes (born 1944)
- Zaire Barnes
- Bill Barnett
- Buster Barnett
- Dean Barnett
- Derek Barnett
- Doug Barnett
- Fred Barnett
- Harlon Barnett
- Nick Barnett
- Oliver Barnett
- Solon Barnett
- Steve Barnett
- Tim Barnett
- Tom Barnett
- Troy Barnett
- Vincent Barnett
- Eppie Barney
- Lem Barney
- Milton Barney
- Tommy Barnhardt
- Dan Barnhart
- Roy Barni
- Gary Barnidge
- Eddie Barnikow
- Amaré Barno
- Len Barnum
- Pete Barnum
- Malcolm Barnwell
- Tyler Baron

== Barr–Baz ==
- Anthony Barr
- Dave Barr
- Mike Barr
- Shorty Barr
- Terry Barr
- Bob Barrabee
- Nate Barragar
- Napoleon Barrel
- Alex Barrett
- Bob Barrett
- Dave Barrett
- David Barrett
- Emmett Barrett
- Jan Barrett
- Jean Barrett
- Jeff Barrett
- John Barrett
- Johnny Barrett
- Josh Barrett
- Reggie Barrett
- Shaquil Barrett
- Sebastian Barrie
- Sam Barrington
- Tom Barrington
- Alex Barron
- Jahdae Barron
- Jim Barron
- Justin Barron
- Mark Barron
- Lamin Barrow
- Micheal Barrow
- Scott Barrows
- Al Barry
- Fred Barry
- Kevin Barry
- Norman Barry
- Odell Barry
- Paul Barry
- Alex Bars
- Brad Bars
- John Barsha
- Steve Bartalo
- Ben Bartch
- William Bartee
- Richard Bartel
- Ron Bartell
- Connor Barth
- Brent Bartholomew
- Sam Bartholomew
- Shemar Bartholomew
- Steve Bartkowski
- Doug Bartlett
- Earl Bartlett
- Jared Bartlett
- Rich Bartlewski
- Ephesians Bartley
- Cody Barton
- Don Barton
- Eric Barton
- Graham Barton
- Greg Barton
- Harris Barton
- Jackson Barton
- Jim Barton
- Kirk Barton
- Hank Bartos
- Joe Bartos
- Mike Bartrum
- Joplo Bartu
- Dick Barwegen
- Connor Barwin
- Carl Barzilauskas
- Fritz Barzilauskas
- Brett Basanez
- Mike Basca
- Brian Baschnagel
- Boogie Basham
- Tarell Basham
- Mose Bashaw
- Idrees Bashir
- Myrt Basing
- Michael Basinger
- Rich Baska
- Micah Baskerville
- Hank Baskett
- Michael Basnight
- Mike Basrak
- Anthony Bass
- Ben Bass
- Bill Bass
- David Bass
- Dick Bass
- Don Bass
- Glenn Bass
- Mike Bass
- Norm Bass
- Robert Bass
- T. J. Bass
- Tyler Bass
- Jeffrey Bassa
- Henry Bassett
- Maurice Bassett
- Eric Bassey
- Essang Bassey
- Dick Bassi
- Reds Bassman
- Bert Baston
- Baron Batch
- Charlie Batch
- Don Batchelor
- Marv Bateman
- Rashod Bateman
- Bill Bates
- Brenden Bates
- Daren Bates
- D'Wayne Bates
- Houston Bates
- Jackie Bates
- Jake Bates
- Jessie Bates
- John Bates
- Mario Bates
- Michael Bates
- Patrick Bates
- Phil Bates
- Ryan Bates
- Solomon Bates
- Ted Bates
- Trevor Bates
- Stan Batinski
- D'Anthony Batiste
- Michael Batiste
- John Batorski
- Cameron Batson
- Marco Battaglia
- Matt Battaglia
- Pat Batteaux
- Danny Batten
- Pat Batten
- Arnaz Battle
- Jackie Battle
- Jim Battle (born 1938)
- Jim Battle (born 1941)
- Jordan Battle
- Julian Battle
- Mike Battle
- Miles Battle
- Ralph Battle
- Ron Battle
- Tra Battle
- Ainsley Battles
- Cliff Battles
- Bobby Batton
- Tyler Batty
- Greg Baty
- A. C. Baur
- Hank Bauer
- Herb Bauer
- John Bauer
- Marcus Baugh
- Sammy Baugh
- Tom Baugh
- Maxie Baughan
- Harry Baujan
- Alf Bauman
- Rashad Bauman
- Buddy Baumann
- Charlie Baumann
- Joe Bill Baumgardner
- Bill Baumgartner
- Steve Baumgartner
- Bob Baumhower
- Zack Baun
- De'Vante Bausby
- Frank Bausch
- Jim Bausch
- David Bavaro
- Mark Bavaro
- Nick Bawden
- Bibbles Bawel
- Carl Bax
- Rob Baxley
- Brad Baxter
- Colin Baxter
- Fred Baxter
- Gary Baxter
- Jarrod Baxter
- Jimmy Baxter
- Lloyd Baxter
- Alex Bayer
- Martin Bayless
- Rick Bayless
- Tom Bayless
- John Bayley
- Evan Baylis
- John Baylor
- Raymond Baylor
- Tim Baylor
- Chris Bayne
- Craig Baynham
- Reaves Baysinger
- Winnie Baze

== Bea–Bem ==
- Fred Beach
- Pat Beach
- Sanjay Beach
- Walter Beach
- Kelvin Beachum
- Zane Beadles
- Norm Beal
- Robert Beal Jr.
- Sam Beal
- Bill Bealles
- Alyn Beals
- Shawn Beals
- Tim Beamer
- Autry Beamon
- Willie Beamon
- Byron Beams
- Bubba Bean
- Robert Bean
- Big Bear
- Ed Beard
- Tom Beard
- Aaron Beasley
- Chad Beasley
- Cole Beasley
- Fred Beasley
- John Beasley (born 1897)
- John Beasley (born 1945)
- Terry Beasley
- Tom Beasley
- Vic Beasley
- Jon Beason
- Emil Beasy
- C. J. Beathard
- Pete Beathard
- Bob Beattie
- Chuck Beatty
- Ed Beatty
- Will Beatty
- Al Beauchamp
- Joe Beauchamp
- Doug Beaudoin
- Clayton Beauford
- Steve Beauharnais
- Abraham Beauplan
- Jim Beaver
- Aubrey Beavers
- Darrian Beavers
- Scott Beavers
- Willie Beavers
- Gary Beban
- Nick Bebout
- Brett Bech
- Jack Bech
- Anthony Becht
- Hub Bechtol
- Andrew Beck
- Braden Beck
- Carl Beck
- Clarence Beck
- John Beck
- Jordan Beck
- Ken Beck
- Marty Beck
- Ray Beck
- Dave Becker
- Doug Becker
- Johnnie Becker
- Kurt Becker
- Nate Becker
- Warren Becker
- Wayland Becker
- John Beckett
- Rogers Beckett
- Tavante Beckett
- Odell Beckham Jr.
- Tony Beckham
- Ian Beckles
- Art Beckley
- Brad Beckman
- Ed Beckman
- Tom Beckman
- Travis Beckum
- Darry Beckwith
- John Beckwith
- Kendell Beckwith
- Mekhi Becton
- Nick Becton
- Brad Bedell
- Gene Bedford
- Vance Bedford
- Chuck Bednarik
- Al Bedner
- Tom Bedore
- Hal Bedsole
- Ryan Bee
- Chad Beebe
- Cooper Beebe
- Don Beebe
- Keith Beebe
- Earl Beecham
- Willie Beecher
- Frank Beede
- Bruce Beekley
- Ferris Beekley
- Josh Beekman
- Bob Beemer
- Tom Beer (born 1944)
- Tom E. Beer (born 1969)
- Terry Beeson
- Reggie Begelton
- Charlie Behan
- Bull Behman
- Mark Behning
- Dave Behrman
- Tom Beier
- Larry Beil
- Ed Beinor
- Jim Beirne
- Monty Beisel
- Randy Beisler
- Bill Belanich
- Jovan Belcher
- Kevin Belcher (born February 23, 1961)
- Kevin Belcher (born November 9, 1961)
- Bunny Belden
- Lester Belding
- Steve Belichick
- Chuck Belin
- Bill Belk
- Rocky Belk
- Veno Belk
- Albert Bell
- Anthony Bell
- Beau Bell
- Bill Bell
- Billy Bell
- Blake Bell
- Bob Bell
- Bobby Bell (born 1940)
- Bobby Bell (born 1962)
- Brandon Bell
- Byron Bell
- Carlos Bell
- Coleman Bell
- D'Anthony Bell
- David Bell
- Demetress Bell
- Ed Bell
- Eddie Bell (born 1931)
- Eddie Bell (born 1946)
- Gordon Bell
- Greg Bell
- Henry Bell
- Jacob Bell
- Jaheim Bell
- Jason Bell
- Jerry Bell
- Joe Bell
- Joique Bell
- Josh Bell
- Kahlil Bell
- Kay Bell
- Ken Bell
- Kendrell Bell
- Kerwin Bell
- Kevin Bell
- Len Bell
- Le'Veon Bell
- Marcus Bell (born 1977)
- Marcus Bell (born 1979)
- Mark Bell (born June 14, 1957)
- Mark Bell (born August 30, 1957)
- Markquese Bell
- Mike Bell (born 1957)
- Mike Bell (born 1983)
- Myron Bell
- Nick Bell
- Quinton Bell
- Richard Bell
- Rick Bell
- Ricky Bell (born 1955)
- Ricky Bell (born 1974)
- Ronnie Bell
- Shonn Bell
- Tatum Bell
- Theo Bell
- Todd Bell
- Travis Bell
- Tyrone Bell
- Vonn Bell
- William Bell
- Yeremiah Bell
- Jay Bellamy
- Josh Bellamy
- LeVante Bellamy
- Mike Bellamy
- Ronald Bellamy
- Vic Bellamy
- Bob Bellinger
- Daniel Bellinger
- Rodney Bellinger
- Mark Bellini
- Joe Bellino
- Greg Bellisari
- B. J. Bello
- Nick Bellore
- George Belotti
- Caesar Belser
- Jason Belser
- Anthony Belton
- Dane Belton
- Horace Belton
- Willie Belton
- Brian Belway
- Al Bemiller

== Ben–Bey ==
- Marcus Benard
- Carey Bender
- Jacob Bender
- Wes Bender
- Jesse Bendross
- Theo Benedet
- Daved Benefield
- Caleb Benenoch
- Lou Benfatti
- Christian Benford
- Brant Bengen
- Rolf Benirschke
- Dan Benish
- Bill Benjamin
- Eno Benjamin
- Guy Benjamin
- Kelvin Benjamin
- Ryan Benjamin (born 1970)
- Ryan Benjamin (born 1977)
- Tony Benjamin
- Travis Benjamin
- Heinie Benkert
- Kurt Benkert
- Arrelious Benn
- Fred Benners
- Antoine Bennett
- Barry Bennett
- Ben Bennett
- Brandon Bennett
- Charles Bennett (born 1963)
- Charles Bennett (born 1983)
- Chuck Bennett
- Cornelius Bennett
- Darren Bennett
- Donnell Bennett
- Drew Bennett
- Earl Bennett
- Edgar Bennett
- Fred Bennett
- Jakorian Bennett
- Jug Bennett
- Lewis Bennett
- Martellus Bennett
- Michael Bennett (born 1978)
- Michael Bennett (born 1985)
- Michael Bennett (born 1993)
- Monte Bennett
- Phil Bennett
- Roy Bennett
- Sean Bennett
- Sid Bennett
- Tommy Bennett
- Tony Bennett
- Woody Bennett
- Brad Benson
- Cedric Benson
- Charles Benson
- Cliff Benson
- Darren Benson
- Duane Benson
- George Benson
- Harry Benson
- Mitchell Benson
- Thomas Benson
- Trey Benson
- Trinity Benson
- Troy Benson
- Albert Bentley
- Bill Bentley
- Ja'Whaun Bentley
- Kevin Bentley
- LeCharles Bentley
- Ray Bentley
- Scott Bentley
- Ulysses Bentley IV
- Benton
- Elijah Benton
- Jim Benton
- Keeanu Benton
- Chris Bentz
- Roman Bentz
- Al Bentzin
- Bené Benwikere
- George Benyola
- Eddie Benz
- Larry Benz
- Beau Benzschawel
- Jake Bequette
- Bob Bercich
- Pete Bercich
- Paul Berezney
- Pete Berezney
- Adam Bergen
- Joe Berger
- Mitch Berger
- Ron Berger
- Matthew Bergeron
- Gil Bergerson
- Eric Bergeson
- Bill Bergey
- Bruce Bergey
- Scott Bergold
- Tony Bergstrom
- Nat Berhe
- Brock Berlin
- Eddie Berlin
- Mackenzy Bernadeau
- Chuck Bernard
- Dave Bernard
- Francis Bernard
- George Bernard
- Giovani Bernard
- Karl Bernard
- Rocky Bernard
- Terrel Bernard
- Walter Bernard
- Jarrick Bernard-Converse
- Frank Bernardi
- Mil Berner
- Ed Bernet
- Lee Bernet
- George Bernhardt
- Jared Bernhardt
- Roger Bernhardt
- Ken Bernich
- Dan Bernoske
- Bobby Berns
- Rick Berns
- Joe Bernstein
- Jordan Bernstine
- Rod Bernstine
- Joy Berquist
- Tim Berra
- Ed Berrang
- Bill Berrehsem
- Bernard Berrian
- Braxton Berrios
- Aaron Berry
- Bertrand Berry
- Bob Berry
- Charlie Berry
- Connie Mack Berry
- Ed Berry
- Eric Berry
- Gary Berry
- George Berry
- Gil Berry
- Howard Berry
- Jordan Berry
- Latin Berry
- Louis Berry
- Rashod Berry
- Ray Berry
- Raymond Berry
- Reggie Berry
- Rex Berry
- Royce Berry
- Wayne Berry
- Stanley Berryhill
- Marv Berschet
- Brenton Bersin
- Libero Bertagnolli
- Angelo Bertelli
- Jim Bertelsen
- Bill Berthusen
- Tony Berti
- Jim Bertoglio
- Taylor Bertolet
- Sean Berton
- JD Bertrand
- Tony Bertuca
- Ed Berwick
- Will Berzinski
- Warren Beson
- Davone Bess
- Gerald Bess
- Rufus Bess
- Don Bessillieu
- Art Best
- Greg Best
- Jahvid Best
- Keith Best
- Teddy Besta
- Antoine Bethea
- Elvin Bethea
- Larry Bethea
- Justin Bethel
- Bobby Bethune
- George Bethune
- Tatum Bethune
- Larry Bettencourt
- Doug Betters
- James Betterson
- Mike Bettiga
- Jerome Bettis
- Tom Bettis
- Ed Bettridge
- John Bettridge
- Ladell Betts
- Steve Beuerlein
- Tom Beutler
- David Beverly
- Dwight Beverly
- Ed Beverly
- Eric Beverly
- Randy Beverly
- Brennen Beyer
- George Beyers

== Bi–Bj ==
- Tyler Biadasz
- Tim Biakabutuka
- Frank Bianchini
- Johnny Biancone
- Dean Biasucci
- E. J. Bibbs
- Kapri Bibbs
- Martin Bibla
- Erik Bickerstaff
- Duane Bickett
- Taye Biddle
- Josh Bidwell
- Adolph Bieberstein
- Leo Biedermann
- Vince Biegel
- Greg Biekert
- Dick Bielski
- Tom Bienemann
- Troy Bienemann
- Eric Bieniemy
- Scotty Bierce
- Kroy Biermann
- Keishawn Bierria
- Terreal Bierria
- Lyle Bigbee
- Atari Bigby
- Keiron Bigby
- E. J. Biggers
- Zeek Biggers
- Riley Biggs
- Verlon Biggs
- Jack Bighead
- Adam Bighill
- Tank Bigsby
- Asmar Bilal
- Jonathan Bilbo
- Dick Bilda
- Fred Biletnikoff
- Andrew Billings
- Jace Billingsley
- Ron Billingsley
- John Billman
- Frank Billock
- Lewis Billups
- Terry Billups
- Christo Bilukidi
- Darnell Bing
- Les Bingaman
- Craig Bingham
- Don Bingham
- Dwight Bingham
- Gregg Bingham
- Guy Bingham
- Ryon Bingham
- David Binn
- Armon Binns
- John Binotto
- Dennis Biodrowski
- John Biolo
- Bront Bird
- Cory Bird
- Rodger Bird
- Steve Bird
- J. J. Birden
- Carl Birdsong
- Craig Birdsong
- Dan Birdwell
- Matt Birk
- Keith Birlem
- Tom Birney
- Rob Bironas
- Joe Biscaha
- Beanie Bishop
- Bill Bishop
- Blaine Bishop
- Cole Bishop
- Desmond Bishop
- Don Bishop
- Freddie Bishop
- Greg Bishop
- Harold Bishop
- Keith Bishop
- Ken Bishop
- Michael Bishop
- Richard Bishop
- Sonny Bishop
- Adam Bisnowaty
- Frank Bissell
- Joel Bitonio
- Don Bitterlich
- Charlie Bivins
- Herb Bizer
- Del Bjork
- Bob Bjorklund
- Hank Bjorklund
- Eric Bjornson

== Bl ==
- Ahmad Black
- Avion Black
- Barry Black
- J. T. "Blondy" Black
- Charlie Black
- Henry Black
- James Black (born 1956)
- James Black (born 1962)
- Jordan Black
- Korie Black
- Mel Black
- Mike Black (born 1961)
- Mike Black (born 1964)
- Nathan Black
- Quincy Black
- Stan Black
- Tarik Black
- Tim Black
- Todd Black
- Yahya Black
- Peter Blackbear
- Bill Blackburn
- Chase Blackburn
- Todd Blackledge
- Hugh Blacklock
- Ross Blacklock
- Ken Blackman
- Stub Blackman
- Don Blackmon
- Harold Blackmon
- Julian Blackmon
- Justin Blackmon
- Mekhi Blackmon
- Robert Blackmon
- Roosevelt Blackmon
- Will Blackmon
- Richard Blackmore
- Saeed Blacknall
- Jeff Blackshear
- Raheem Blackshear
- Angelo Blackson
- Darryl Blackstock
- Alois Blackwell
- Hal Blackwell
- Josh Blackwell
- Kelly Blackwell
- Kory Blackwell
- Will Blackwell
- Glenn Blackwood
- Lyle Blackwood
- Willie Blade
- Bennie Blades
- Brian Blades
- H. B. Blades
- Brian Blados
- Joe Blahak
- Russ Blailock
- Ed Blaine
- Chris Blair
- George Blair
- Marquise Blair
- Matt Blair
- Michael Blair
- Paul Blair
- Ronald Blair
- Stanley Blair
- T. C. Blair
- Kerlin Blaise
- Antwon Blake
- Christian Blake
- Jeff Blake
- Ricky Blake
- Tom Blake
- Robert Blakely
- Dwayne Blakley
- Justin Blalock
- Cary Blanchard
- Dick Blanchard
- Tom Blanchard
- Carl Bland
- DaRon Bland
- Tony Bland
- George Blanda
- Ernie Blandin
- Brian Blankenship
- Greg Blankenship
- Reed Blankenship
- Rodrigo Blankenship
- Sid Blanks
- Jerry Blanton
- Kendall Blanton
- Robert Blanton
- Scott Blanton
- Khari Blasingame
- Anthony Blaylock
- Derrick Blaylock
- Phil Blazer
- Tony Blazine
- Jeff Bleamer
- Amani Bledsoe
- Curtis Bledsoe
- Drew Bledsoe
- Joshuah Bledsoe
- Mal Bleecker
- Mel Bleeker
- Tom Bleick
- Bob Bleier
- Johnny Bleier
- Rocky Bleier
- Paul Blessing
- Darrius Blevins
- Tony Blevins
- Chris Blewitt
- Dennis Bligen
- Stan Blinka
- Harry Bliss
- Homer Bliss
- Greg Bloedorn
- Tom Blondin
- Al Bloodgood
- David Blough
- Alvin Blount
- Ed Blount
- Eric Blount
- Jeb Blount
- Joey Blount
- Lamar Blount
- LeGarrette Blount
- Mel Blount
- Tony Blount
- Al Blozis
- Alfred Blue
- Forrest Blue
- Greg Blue
- Jaydon Blue
- Luther Blue
- Tony Blue
- Jim Blumenstock
- Herbert Blumer
- Matt Blundin
- Dré Bly
- Ronnie Blye
- Austin Blythe

== Boa–Boni ==
- Steve Boadway
- Chris Board
- C. J. Board
- Dwaine Board
- Mack Boatner
- Kenneth Boatright
- Harry Boatswain
- Bon Boatwright
- Adam Bob
- Jacob Bobenmoyer
- Chris Bober
- Alex Bobidosh
- Hubert Bobo
- Jake Bobo
- Orlando Bobo
- Joe Bock
- John Bock
- Wayne Bock
- Colby Bockwoldt
- Leigh Bodden
- Tony Boddie
- Briean Boddy-Calhoun
- Lynn Boden
- Maury Bodenger
- Ping Bodie
- Shaun Bodiford
- Russell Bodine
- Patrick Body
- Bill Boedeker
- Evan Boehm
- Jim Boeke
- Fred Boensch
- Marc Boerigter
- Chuck Boerio
- Champ Boettcher
- Ike Boettger
- Rex Boggan
- Mark Boggs
- Taylor Boggs
- Phil Bogle
- George Bogue
- Quinton Bohanna
- Fred Bohannon
- Tommy Bohanon
- Dewey Bohling
- Rob Bohlinger
- Frank Bohlmann
- Ron Bohm
- Reed Bohovich
- Karl Bohren
- Rocky Boiman
- Corey Bojorquez
- Novo Bojovic
- Kim Bokamper
- George Bolan
- Ned Bolcar
- Brandon Bolden
- Gary Bolden
- Isaiah Bolden
- Juran Bolden
- Leroy Bolden
- Omar Bolden
- Rickey Bolden
- Victor Bolden Jr.
- Anquan Boldin
- Chase Boldt
- Brock Bolen
- Michael Boley
- Bookie Bolin
- Clint Boling
- Russ Bolinger
- Nick Bolkovac
- Don Boll
- Kyle Boller
- Garett Bolles
- Brian Bollinger
- Brooks Bollinger
- Eddie Bollinger
- Conrad Bolston
- Andy Bolton
- Curtis Bolton
- Harry Bolton
- Nick Bolton
- Ron Bolton
- Scott Bolton
- Lynn Bomar
- Jack Bonadies
- Chuck Bond
- Devante Bond
- Deyshawn Bond
- Isaiah Bond
- James Bond
- Rink Bond
- Travis Bond
- Terrell Bonds
- Bourbon Bondurant
- Warren Bone
- Ernie Bonelli
- Shane Bonham
- Chris Boniol
- Nik Bonitto
