= List of NFL players (Bonn–By) =

This is a list of players who have appeared in at least one regular season or postseason game in the National Football League (NFL), American Football League (AFL), or All-America Football Conference (AAFC) and have a last name that falls between "Bonn" and "By". For the rest of the B's, see list of NFL players (Ba–Boni). This list is accurate through the end of the 2025 NFL season.

== Bonn–Boz ==
- Reggie Bonnafon
- Brian Bonner
- Ethan Bonner
- Glen Bonner
- Melvin Bonner
- Rik Bonness
- Steve Bono
- Elliott Bonowitz
- Ian Book
- Austin Booker
- Devontae Booker
- Fred Booker
- Lorenzo Booker
- Marty Booker
- Michael Booker
- Thomas Booker
- Tyler Booker
- Vaughn Booker
- Johnny Bookman
- Billy Bookout
- Bob Books
- Alex Boone
- Alfonso Boone
- David Boone
- Greg Boone
- J. R. Boone
- Jack Boone
- Mike Boone
- Dorian Boose
- Andrew Booth Jr.
- Clarence Booth
- Dick Booth
- Issac Booth
- Kevin Boothe
- Dicaprio Bootle
- John Booty
- Emerson Boozer
- Fred Borak
- Jon Borchardt
- Dennis Borcky
- Chris Bordano
- Ben Bordelon
- Ken Bordelon
- Les Borden
- Nate Borden
- Breon Borders
- Nate Borders
- Nick Borelli
- Jocelyn Borgella
- Dirk Borgognone
- Chris Borland
- Kyle Borland
- Tuf Borland
- Larry Borom
- Andy Borregales
- Rich Borresen
- Blake Bortles
- Tanor Bortolini
- John Borton
- Mark Bortz
- Jarvis Borum
- Mike Boryla
- Joey Bosa
- John Bosa
- Nick Bosa
- Wade Bosarge
- Frank Bosch
- Ryan Boschetti
- John Bosdett
- Tony Boselli
- Matt Bosher
- Bruce Bosley
- Keith Bosley
- Cap Boso
- Kevin Boss
- Don Bosseler
- James Bostic
- Jason Bostic
- Jeff Bostic
- Joe Bostic
- John Bostic
- Jon Bostic
- Keith Bostic
- Brandon Bostick
- Lew Bostick
- David Boston
- McKinley Boston
- Tre Boston
- Ben Boswell
- Chris Boswell
- Brian Bosworth
- Kyle Bosworth
- Ron Botchan
- Kirk Botkin
- Scott Boucher
- Jim Boudreaux
- Lee Bouggess
- Kevin Bouie
- Tony Bouie
- Gil Bouley
- Michael Boulware
- Peter Boulware
- Todd Bouman
- Emil Boures
- Kendrick Bourne
- Kayshon Boutte
- Marc Boutte
- Lo Boutwell
- Tommy Boutwell
- Shawn Bouwens
- A. J. Bouye
- Willie Bouyer
- Matt Bouza
- Tony Bova
- Peter Bove
- Luke Bowanko
- Gordon Bowdell
- Joe Bowden
- Lynn Bowden
- Jim Bowdoin
- Dwayne Bowe
- Alvin Bowen
- Ken Bowen
- Matt Bowen
- Stephen Bowen
- David Bowens
- Tim Bowens
- Phil Bower
- Tashawn Bower
- Andy Bowers
- Bill Bowers
- Brock Bowers
- Da'Quan Bowers
- Nick Bowers
- R. J. Bowers
- Sam Bowers
- Tony Bowick
- John Bowie
- Larry Bowie (born 1939)
- Larry Bowie (born 1973)
- Michael Bowie
- Todd Bowles
- Andy Bowling
- Barry Bowman
- Bill Bowman
- Billy Bowman Jr.
- Braedon Bowman
- Jim Bowman
- Ken Bowman
- Kevin Bowman
- NaVorro Bowman
- Steve Bowman
- Zack Bowman
- Fabien Bownes
- Arda Bowser
- Charles Bowser
- Tyus Bowser
- Walt Bowyer
- Cloyce Box
- Jerry Boyarsky
- Josh Boyce
- Bill Boyd
- Bob Boyd
- Bobby Boyd
- Brent Boyd
- Cory Boyd
- Danny Boyd
- Dennis Boyd
- Elmo Boyd
- Greg Boyd (born 1950)
- Greg Boyd (born 1952)
- James Boyd
- Jerome Boyd (born 1986)
- Jerome Boyd (born 1961)
- Josh Boyd
- Khristian Boyd
- Kris Boyd
- LaVell Boyd
- Malik Boyd
- Sam Boyd
- Sean Boyd
- Stephen Boyd
- Tom Boyd
- Tommie Boyd
- Tyler Boyd
- Mike Boyda
- Max Boydston
- Ekow Boye-Doe
- Brant Boyer
- Mark Boyer
- Verdi Boyer
- Lon Boyett
- Garland Boyette
- Brandon Boykin
- Deral Boykin
- Greg Boykin
- Jarrett Boykin
- Lance Boykin
- McKinley Boykin
- Miles Boykin
- Trevone Boykin
- Brett Boyko
- Jim Boylan
- Jim Boyle
- Knuckles Boyle
- Nick Boyle
- Tim Boyle
- Benny Boynton
- George Boynton
- John Boynton
- Bradley Bozeman
- Swayze Bozeman

== Bra–Bre ==
- Ordell Braase
- Tom Braatz
- Cary Brabham
- Danny Brabham
- Bill Brace
- Ron Brace
- Greg Bracelin
- Don Bracken
- Tyron Brackenridge
- Tony Brackens
- Brett Brackett
- Gary Brackett
- M. L. Brackett
- Charlie Brackins
- James Bradberry
- Garrett Bradbury
- Beau Brade
- Ben Braden
- David Braden
- Cameron Bradfield
- Allen Bradford
- Anthony Bradford
- Carl Bradford
- Corey Bradford
- Millard Bradford
- Paul Bradford
- Ronnie Bradford
- Sam Bradford
- Byron Bradfute
- Nigel Bradham
- Bam Bradley
- Bill Bradley
- Carlos Bradley
- Chuck Bradley (born 1950)
- Chuck Bradley (born 1970)
- Danny Bradley
- Dave Bradley
- Ed Bradley (born 1927)
- Ed Bradley (born 1950)
- Freddie Bradley
- Hal Bradley
- Harold Bradley Jr.
- Harold Bradley Sr.
- Henry Bradley
- Hunter Bradley
- Ja'Marcus Bradley
- Jon Bradley
- Luther Bradley
- Mark Bradley
- Melvin Bradley
- Shaun Bradley
- Steve Bradley
- Stewart Bradley
- Will Bradley-King
- Ahmad Bradshaw
- Charlie Bradshaw
- Craig Bradshaw
- Jim Bradshaw (born 1898)
- Jim Bradshaw (born 1939)
- Morris Bradshaw
- Terry Bradshaw
- Wes Bradshaw
- Darius Bradwell
- Donny Brady
- Ed Brady
- Jeff Brady
- Kerry Brady
- Kyle Brady
- Pat Brady
- Philip Brady
- Rickey Brady
- Tom Brady
- Michael Bragg
- Mike Bragg
- Byron Braggs
- Stephen Braggs
- Dennis Bragonier
- Rich Braham
- Tom Brahaney
- Larry Brahm
- Chuck Braidwood
- Jordan Brailford
- Art Braman
- Bryan Braman
- Don Bramlett
- John Bramlett
- Mark Brammer
- George Brancato
- Alan Branch
- Andre Branch
- Brian Branch
- Bruce Branch
- Calvin Branch
- Cliff Branch
- Colin Branch
- Deion Branch
- Jamaal Branch
- Mel Branch
- Reggie Branch
- Tyvon Branch
- Art Brandau
- Butch Brandau
- Blake Brandel
- Dan Brandenburg
- John Brandes
- David Brandon
- Michael Brandon
- Sam Brandon
- Tom Brandstater
- David Brandt
- Jim Brandt
- Joe Braney
- Solomon Brannan
- John Brannon
- Robert Brannon
- Phil Branon
- Kent Branstetter
- Caleb Brantley
- Chris Brantley
- John Brantley
- Scot Brantley
- Gene Branton
- Chris Braswell
- Christian Braswell
- Cameron Brate
- Zeke Bratkowski
- Eddie Bratt
- Jason Bratton
- Mel Bratton
- Chad Bratzke
- Ben Braunecker
- Daniel Braverman
- Alex Bravo
- Jack Bravyak
- Ed Brawley
- David Braxton
- Hezekiah Braxton
- Jim Braxton
- Tyrone Braxton
- Maury Bray
- Quan Bray
- Ray Bray
- Tyler Bray
- Tyler Brayton
- Carl Brazell
- Larry Braziel
- Robert Brazile
- LaVon Brazill
- Sam Brazinsky
- Carl Brazley
- Chris Brazzell
- Steve Breaston
- Delvin Breaux
- Don Breaux
- Bill Bredde
- Ben Bredeson
- John Bredice
- Ed Breding
- Jim Breech
- Bill Breeden
- Louis Breeden
- Kevin Breedlove
- Rod Breedlove
- Bashaud Breeland
- Adrian Breen
- Gene Breen
- Drew Brees
- Brady Breeze
- Jeff Bregel
- Matt Breida
- Bob Breitenstein
- Jake Brendel
- Wayne Brenkert
- Brian Brennan
- John Brennan
- Leo Brennan
- Matt Brennan
- Mike Brennan
- Phil Brennan
- Willis Brennan
- Al Brenner
- Hoby Brenner
- Ray Brenner
- Sam Brenner
- Josh Brent
- K. J. Brent
- JuJu Brents
- Bryan Bresee
- Monte Brethauer
- Jeep Brett
- Carl Brettschneider
- Bob Breunig
- Dorian Brew
- Aaron Brewer (born 1990)
- Aaron Brewer (born 1997)
- Billy Brewer
- Brooke Brewer
- C. J. Brewer
- Chandler Brewer
- Chris Brewer
- Dewell Brewer
- Jack Brewer
- James Brewer
- John Brewer (born 1906)
- John Brewer (born 1928)
- Johnny Brewer
- Sean Brewer
- Jim Brewington
- Mike Brewster
- Pete Brewster
- Robert Brewster
- Walt Brewster
- Bobby Brezina
- Greg Brezina

== Bri–Brov ==
- Bill Brian
- Harry Brian
- Frank Briante
- Alundis Brice
- Kentrell Brice
- Will Brice
- Shirley Brick
- George Brickley
- Jeremy Bridges
- Trikweze Bridges
- Teddy Bridgewater
- Lane Bridgford
- Tom Briehl
- Doug Brien
- O. J. Brigance
- Bill Briggs
- Bob Briggs (born 1941)
- Bob Briggs (born 1945)
- Diyral Briggs
- Greg Briggs
- Jowon Briggs
- Lance Briggs
- Paul Briggs
- Walter Briggs
- Hi Brigham
- Jeremy Brigham
- Anthony Bright
- Greg Bright
- Leon Bright
- Lamont Brightful
- Gary Brightwell
- Hal Brill
- Darrick Brilz
- James Brim
- Mike Brim
- Walt Brindley
- Kyle Brindza
- Larry Brink
- Beau Brinkley
- Curtis Brinkley
- Jasper Brinkley
- Lester Brinkley
- Austin Brinkman
- Cookie Brinkman
- Dana Brinson
- Larry Brinson
- Warren Brinson
- Vincent Brisby
- Dezmon Briscoe
- Marlin Briscoe
- Mike Brisiel
- Jaquan Brisker
- Jacoby Brissett
- Bubby Brister
- Willie Brister
- John Bristor
- Obie Bristow
- Gene Brito
- Charley Britt
- Eddie Britt
- James Britt
- Jessie Britt
- Justin Britt
- K. J. Britt
- Kenny Britt
- Maurice Britt
- Oscar Britt
- Ralph Britt
- Rankin Britt
- Wesley Britt
- Jon Brittenum
- Earl Britton
- Eben Britton
- Max Broadhurst
- Karl Broadley
- Jerry Broadnax
- Marion Broadstone
- Charley Brock
- Clyde Brock
- Dieter Brock
- Eric Brock
- Fred Brock
- Kevin Brock
- Lou Brock
- Lou Brock Jr.
- Matt Brock
- Pete Brock
- Raheem Brock
- Stan Brock
- Tramaine Brock
- Willie Brock
- Richie Brockel
- Blake Brockermeyer
- Michael Brockers
- Jeff Brockhaus
- John Brockington
- Hal Broda
- Bob Brodhead
- John Brodie
- Mason Brodine
- J. W. Brodnax
- Chuck Brodnicki
- Nick Broeker
- Brian Brohm
- Jeff Brohm
- Fred Broker
- Henry Broker
- Lorenzo Bromell
- Jay Bromley
- Ben Bronson
- John Bronson
- Josiah Bronson
- Zack Bronson
- Tommy Brooker
- Keith Brooking
- Jason Brookins
- Mitchell Brookins
- Aaron Brooks
- Ahmad Brooks (born 1980)
- Ahmad Brooks (born 1984)
- Antoine Brooks
- Barrett Brooks
- Bill Brooks
- Billy Brooks
- Bob Brooks
- Bobby Brooks (born 1951)
- Bobby Brooks (born 1976)
- Brandon Brooks
- British Brooks
- Bucky Brooks
- Bud Brooks
- Cariel Brooks
- Carlos Brooks
- Chet Brooks
- Chris Brooks (born 1987)
- Chris Brooks (born 2000)
- Clifford Brooks
- Derrick Brooks
- Durant Brooks
- Ethan Brooks
- Greg Brooks
- Ja'Corey Brooks
- Jalen Brooks
- Jamal Brooks
- James Brooks
- Jermaine Brooks
- Jon Brooks
- Jonathon Brooks
- Jordyn Brooks
- Karl Brooks
- Kendell Brooks
- Kevin Brooks
- Larry Brooks
- Leo Brooks
- Macey Brooks
- Mic'hael Brooks
- Michael Brooks (born 1964)
- Michael Brooks (born 1967)
- Nate Brooks
- Natrone Brooks
- Perry Brooks
- Reggie Brooks
- Robert Brooks
- Rodregis Brooks
- Ron Brooks
- Steve Brooks
- Tahj Brooks
- Terrence Brooks
- Tony Brooks
- Tony Brooks-James
- Tom Brookshier
- Jay Brophy
- Al Brosky
- Max Brosmer
- Matt Bross
- Bern Brostek
- Kentrell Brothers
- Bob Brotzki
- Cortez Broughton
- Luther Broughton
- Nehemiah Broughton
- Vernon Broughton
- Walter Broughton
- Willie Broughton
- Fred Broussard
- Jamall Broussard
- John Broussard
- Steve Broussard (born 1947)
- Steve Broussard (born 1967)
- Angelo Brovelli

== Brow ==
- A. B. Brown
- Aaron Brown (born 1943)
- Aaron Brown (born 1956)
- Aaron Brown (born 1985)
- A. J. Brown
- Alex Brown (born 1979)
- Alex Brown (born 1996)
- Allen Brown
- Andre Brown (born 1966)
- Andre Brown (born 1986)
- Andrew Brown
- Anthony Brown (born 1972)
- Anthony Brown (born 1993)
- Anthony Brown (born 1998)
- Antonio Brown (born 1978)
- Antonio Brown (born 1988)
- Arnold Brown
- Arthur Brown
- Barry Brown
- Ben Brown
- Bill Brown (born 1918)
- Bill Brown (born 1936)
- Bill Brown (born 1938)
- Blair Brown
- Bob Brown (born 1939)
- Bob Brown (born 1941)
- Bobby Brown
- Bobby Brown III
- Booker Brown
- Boyd Brown
- Brittain Brown
- Bryce Brown
- Bud Brown
- Buddy Brown
- Cam Brown
- C. C. Brown
- Carlos Brown
- Cedric Brown
- Cedrick Brown
- Chad Brown (born 1970)
- Chad Brown (born 1971)
- Charles Brown (born 1936)
- Charles Brown (born 1987)
- Charlie Brown (born 1942)
- Charlie Brown (born 1945)
- Charlie Brown (born 1948)
- Charlie Brown (born 1958)
- Chase Brown
- Chris Brown (born 1962)
- Chris Brown (born 1963)
- Chris Brown (born 1978)
- Chris Brown (born 1981)
- Chuck Brown
- Chykie Brown
- Clay Brown
- Colin Brown
- Corey Brown
- Cornelius Brown
- Cornell Brown
- Corwin Brown
- Courtney Brown (born 1978)
- Courtney Brown (born 1984)
- Curtis Brown (born 1954)
- Curtis Brown (born 1988)
- Cyron Brown
- Dan Brown
- Daniel Brown
- Dante Brown
- Dave Brown (born 1920)
- Dave Brown (born 1953)
- Dave Brown (born 1964)
- Dave Brown (born 1970)
- Dean Brown
- DeAuntae Brown
- Dee Brown
- Delvin Brown
- Dennis Brown
- Deonte Brown
- Derek Brown (born 1970)
- Derek Brown (born 1971)
- Derrick Brown
- Don Brown (born 1937)
- Don Brown (born 1959)
- Donald Brown (born 1963)
- Donald Brown (born 1987)
- Donatello Brown
- Doug Brown (born 1938)
- Doug Brown (born 1974)
- Duane Brown
- Dyami Brown
- Earnest Brown IV
- Ed Brown
- Eddie Brown (born 1952)
- Eddie Brown (born 1962)
- Elton Brown
- Eric Brown (born 1964)
- Eric Brown (born 1967)
- Eric Brown (born 1975)
- Ernie Brown
- Evan Brown
- Everette Brown
- Fadol Brown
- Fakhir Brown
- Fred Brown (born 1905)
- Fred Brown (born 1938)
- Fred Brown (born 1943)
- Fred Brown (born 1993)
- Gary Brown (born 1969)
- Gary Brown (born 1971)
- George Brown (born 1894)
- George Brown (born 1923)
- Gilbert Brown
- Gordon Brown
- Greg Brown
- Guy Brown
- Hardy Brown
- Howie Brown
- Ivory Lee Brown
- J. B. Brown
- Jack Brown
- Jalil Brown
- James Brown (born 1970)
- James Brown (born 1988)
- Jamie Brown
- Jammal Brown
- Jamon Brown
- Jaron Brown
- Jason Brown
- Jatavis Brown
- Jayon Brown
- Jerome Brown
- Jerry Brown
- Jesse Brown
- Ji'Ayir Brown
- Jim Brown
- Joe Brown
- John Brown (born 1922)
- John Brown (born 1939)
- John Brown (born 1990)
- Jonathan Brown (born 1975)
- Jonathan Brown (born 1992)
- Josh Brown
- Justin Brown
- Kareem Brown
- Ken Brown (born 1945)
- Ken Brown (born 1954)
- Ken Brown (born 1965)
- Ken Brown (born 1971)
- Kevin Brown
- Kourtnei Brown
- Kris Brown
- Kyron Brown
- Lance Brown
- Laron Brown
- Larry Brown (born 1947)
- Larry Brown (born 1949)
- Larry Brown (born 1955)
- Larry Brown (born 1963)
- Larry Brown (born 1969)
- Larry Brown (born 1976)
- Levi Brown (born 1984)
- Levi Brown (born 1987)
- Lomas Brown
- Mack Brown
- Malcolm Brown
- Malcom Brown
- Marc Brown
- Marcus Brown
- Mark Brown (born 1961)
- Mark Brown (born 1980)
- Marlon Brown
- Marquise Brown
- Marv Brown
- Matt Brown (born 1891)
- Michael Brown
- Mike Brown (born 1978)
- Mike Brown (born 1989)
- Mike Brown (born 1999)
- Miles Brown
- Milford Brown
- Montaric Brown
- Monty Brown
- Na Brown
- Noah Brown
- Norris Brown
- Omar Brown (born 1975)
- Omar Brown (born 1988)
- Omar Brown (born 2000)
- Orlando Brown (born 1970)
- Orlando Brown (born 1996)
- Otto Brown
- Patrick Brown
- Pete Brown
- Pharaoh Brown
- Preston Brown (born 1958)
- Preston Brown (born 1992)
- Ralph Brown
- Ray Brown (born 1936)
- Ray Brown (born 1948)
- Ray Brown (born 1962)
- Ray Brown (born 1965)
- Reggie Brown (born 1960)
- Reggie Brown (born 1970)
- Reggie Brown (born 1973)
- Reggie Brown (born 1974)
- Reggie Brown (born 1981)
- Richard Brown (born 1907)
- Richard Brown (born 1965)
- Ricky Brown
- Robert Brown (born 1943)
- Robert Brown (born 1960)
- Roger Brown (born 1937)
- Roger Brown (born 1966)
- Ron Brown (born 1961)
- Ron Brown (born 1963)
- Ron Brown (born 1964)
- Ronnie Brown
- Rosey Brown
- Ruben Brown
- Rufus Brown (born 1980)
- Rufus Brown (born 1962)
- Rush Brown
- Sammy Brown
- Selwyn Brown
- Sergio Brown
- Sheldon Brown
- Sidney Brown
- Sonny Brown
- Spencer Brown (born February 28, 1998)
- Spencer Brown (born November 13, 1998)
- Stan Brown
- Steve Brown
- Stevie Brown
- Sydney Brown
- Tarell Brown
- Ted Brown
- Terry Brown
- Theotis Brown
- Thomas Brown
- Tim Brown
- Timmy Brown
- Titus Brown
- Tom Brown (born 1921)
- Tom Brown (born 1940)
- Tom Brown (born 1963)
- Tom Brown (born 1964)
- Tony Brown (born 1964)
- Tony Brown (born 1970)
- Tony Brown (born 1980)
- Tony Brown (born 1995)
- Tony Brown (born 1997)
- Travis Brown
- Tre Brown
- Trent Brown
- Troy Brown
- Tyrone Brown
- Vincent Brown (born 1965)
- Vincent Brown (born 1989)
- Wilbert Brown
- Willie Brown (born 1940)
- Willie Brown (born 1942)
- Zach Brown
- Gordie Browne
- Jim Browne
- Brandon Browner
- Jim Browner
- Joey Browner
- Keith Browner
- Keith Browner Jr.
- Ross Browner
- Baron Browning
- Bryant Browning
- Charlie Browning
- Dave Browning
- Gregg Browning
- Jack Browning
- Jake Browning
- John Browning
- Claude Brownlee
- Jarvis Brownlee Jr.
- Jason Brownlee
- Darrick Brownlow

== Broy–Brz ==
- Ryan Broyles
- Dick Brubaker
- Arland Bruce III
- Aundray Bruce
- Gail Bruce
- Isaac Bruce
- Mkristo Bruce
- Les Bruckner
- Nick Bruckner
- Doc Bruder
- Hank Bruder
- Bob Brudzinski
- Charlie Brueckman
- Carson Bruener
- Mark Bruener
- Bob Bruer
- Rob Bruggeman
- Bob Bruggers
- John Bruhin
- Boyd Brumbaugh
- Carl Brumbaugh
- Justin Brumbaugh
- Jack Brumfield
- Jim Brumfield
- Scott Brumfield
- Bob Brumley
- Don Brumm
- Fred Brumm
- Roman Brumm
- Dewey Brundage
- Bill Brundige
- Larry Brune
- Mark Brunell
- Sam Brunelli
- Bob Brunet
- Fred Bruney
- Austin Brucklacher
- Scott Brunner
- Dave Bruno
- John Bruno
- Daniel Brunskill
- Larry Brunson
- Mike Brunson
- T.J. Brunson
- Brunswick
- Ross Brupbacher
- Tedy Bruschi
- Logan Bruss
- Daryon Brutley
- David Bruton
- Jim Brutz
- Billy Bryan
- Chris Bryan
- Copeland Bryan
- Courtney Bryan
- Johnny Bryan
- Rick Bryan
- Steve Bryan
- Taven Bryan
- Walter Bryan
- Anthony Bryant
- Antonio Bryant
- Armonty Bryant
- Austin Bryant
- Beno Bryant
- Bill Bryant
- Bob Bryant (born 1918)
- Bob Bryant (born 1937)
- Bobby Bryant
- Brandin Bryant
- Charlie Bryant
- Christian Bryant
- Chuck Bryant
- Cobee Bryant
- Coby Bryant
- Corbin Bryant
- Cullen Bryant
- Desmond Bryant
- Dez Bryant
- Domingo Bryant
- Fernando Bryant
- Harrison Bryant
- Hubie Bryant
- Hunter Bryant
- Jeff Bryant
- Jim Bryant
- Junior Bryant
- Kelvin Bryant
- Marcus Bryant
- Martavis Bryant
- Matt Bryant
- Myles Bryant
- Pat Bryant
- Red Bryant
- Roderick Bryant
- Romby Bryant
- Steve Bryant
- Tim Bryant
- Tony Bryant
- Trent Bryant
- Ventell Bryant
- Warren Bryant
- Waymond Bryant
- Wendell Bryant
- Shawn Bryson
- Doug Brzezinski

== Bua–Burn ==
- Tony Bua
- Mark Buben
- Deone Bucannon
- Mike Bucchianeri
- Ray Bucek
- Buck Buchanan
- Charles Buchanan
- Michael Buchanan
- Ray Buchanan
- Richard Buchanan
- Steve Buchanan
- Teddye Buchanan
- Tim Buchanan
- Phillip Buchanon
- Will Buchanon
- Willie Buchanon
- Bill Bucher
- Frank Bucher
- Cub Buck
- Jason Buck
- Mike Buck
- Vince Buck
- Don Buckey
- Jeff Buckey
- Garland Buckeye
- Correll Buckhalter
- Bill Buckler
- Phil H. Bucklew
- Curtis Buckley
- Eldra Buckley
- Marcus Buckley
- Ralph Buckley
- Terrell Buckley
- Ted Bucklin
- Tom Buckman
- Brentson Buckner
- DeForest Buckner
- Bob Buczkowski
- Carl Buda
- Frank Budd
- Johnny Budd
- Brad Budde
- Ed Budde
- Frank Budka
- Bill Budness
- Tom Budrewicz
- Shane Buechele
- David Buehler
- George Buehler
- Dan Buenning
- Bart Buetow
- Ted Buffalo
- Harry Buffington
- Doug Buffone
- Maury Buford
- Tony Buford
- Gary Bugenhagen
- Danny Buggs
- Isaiah Buggs
- Marcus Buggs
- Larry Buhler
- Drew Buie
- Ray Buivid
- Glenn Bujnoch
- Joe Bukant
- Fred Bukaty
- Rudy Bukich
- George Buksar
- Bryan Bulaga
- Norm Bulaich
- Walt Buland
- Chet Bulger
- Marc Bulger
- Ronnie Bull
- Scott Bull
- Courtland Bullard
- Javon Bullard
- Jonathan Bullard
- Kendricke Bullard
- Louis Bullard
- Melvin Bullitt
- Gale Bullman
- Calen Bullock
- Corey Bullock
- John Bullock
- Randy Bullock
- Amos Bullocks
- Daniel Bullocks
- Josh Bullocks
- Chuck Bullough
- Hank Bullough
- Max Bullough
- Riley Bullough
- Brian Bulluck
- Keith Bulluck
- Tim Bulman
- Art Bultman
- Max Bumgardner
- Rex Bumgardner
- Michael Bumpus
- Derek Bunch
- Jarrod Bunch
- Frank Buncom
- Mike Bundra
- Jim Bundren
- Marquis Bundy
- Ken Bungarda
- Brodrick Bunkley
- Ian Bunting
- John Bunting
- John Bunyan
- Dan Bunz
- Nick Buoniconti
- Cornell Burbage
- Aaron Burbridge
- Jerry Burch
- Jordan Burch
- Don Burchfield
- Luther Burden III
- Lloyd Burdick
- Vontaze Burfict
- Chris Burford
- Spencer Burford
- Glen Burgeis
- Todd Burger
- Charlie Burgess
- Derrick Burgess
- Fernanza Burgess
- James Burgess (born 1974)
- James Burgess (born 1994)
- Marvell Burgess
- Prescott Burgess
- Ronnie Burgess
- Terrell Burgess
- Al Burgin
- Ted Burgmeier
- Earl Burgner
- Adrian Burk
- Scott Burk
- Anthony Burke
- Chick Burke
- Denzel Burke
- Don Burke
- Joe Burke
- John Burke
- Mark Burke
- Mike Burke
- Randy Burke
- Tom Burke
- Vern Burke
- Chris Burkett
- Jackie Burkett
- Jeff Burkett
- Rex Burkhead
- Brandon Burks
- Dialleo Burks
- Joe Burks
- Oren Burks
- Randy Burks
- Raymond Burks
- Shawn Burks
- Steve Burks
- Treylon Burks
- Alex Burl
- John Burleson
- Nate Burleson
- Gary Burley
- Marcus Burley
- George Burman
- Danny Burmeister
- Forrest Burmeister
- Max Burnell
- Bobby Burnett
- Chester Burnett
- Dale Burnett
- Deontay Burnett
- Joe Burnett
- Kaelin Burnett
- Kevin Burnett
- Len Burnett
- Morgan Burnett
- Raymond Burnett
- Rob Burnett
- Victor Burnett
- Dave Burnette
- Reggie Burnette
- Tom Burnette
- Amari Burney
- Lem Burnham
- Stanley Burnham
- Tim Burnham
- Hank Burnine
- Artie Burns
- Brian Burns
- Curry Burns
- Ed Burns
- Jason Burns
- Joe Burns
- Keith Burns
- Lamont Burns
- Leon Burns
- Mike Burns
- Robert Burns
- George Burnside

== Burr–By ==
- Ben Burr-Kirven
- Clinton Burrell
- George Burrell
- John Burrell
- Ode Burrell
- Plaxico Burress
- Bo Burris
- Buddy Burris
- Henry Burris
- Jeff Burris
- Juston Burris
- Miles Burris
- John Burrough
- Ken Burrough
- Derrick Burroughs
- Don Burroughs
- James Burroughs
- Sammie Burroughs
- Curtis Burrow
- Jim Burrow
- Joe Burrow
- Ken Burrow
- Harry Burrus
- Lloyd Burruss
- Isaiah Burse
- Tony Burse
- Jimmy Burson
- Hal Burt
- Jim Burt
- Russ Burt
- Al Burton
- Antwon Burton
- Brandon Burton
- Deante Burton
- Derek Burton
- James Burton
- Jermaine Burton
- Keenan Burton
- Kendrick Burton
- Larry Burton
- Leon Burton
- Leonard Burton
- Lyle Burton
- Michael Burton
- Ron Burton (born 1936)
- Ron Burton (born 1964)
- Shane Burton
- Stephen Burton
- Trey Burton
- Tyreek Burwell
- Sherrill Busby
- Elmer Busch
- Mike Busch
- Blair Bush
- Deon Bush
- Devin Bush Sr.
- Devin Bush Jr.
- Frank Bush
- Jarrett Bush
- Josh Bush
- Lewis Bush
- Michael Bush
- Rafael Bush
- Ray Bush
- Reggie Bush
- Steve Bush
- Thomas Bushby
- Matt Bushman
- Jermon Bushrod
- Sam Busich
- Steve Busick
- John Busing
- Ray Busler
- Art Buss
- Gerry Bussell
- Barney Bussey
- Dexter Bussey
- Nate Bussey
- Young Bussey
- Paul Butcher
- Wendell Butcher
- Harrison Butker
- Carl Butkus
- Dick Butkus
- Adam Butler
- Bill Butler (born 1937)
- Bill Butler (born 1947)
- Bill Butler (born 1950)
- Bob Butler
- Bobby Butler
- Brad Butler
- Brice Butler
- Cannonball Butler
- Chuck Butler
- Crezdon Butler
- Darien Butler
- Darius Butler
- Dave Butler
- Deon Butler
- Donald Butler
- Drew Butler
- Duane Butler
- Frank Butler
- Gary Butler
- Hakeem Butler
- Hillary Butler
- Jack Butler
- James Butler
- Jerametrius Butler
- Jeremy Butler
- Jerry Butler (born 1957)
- Jerry Butler (born 1961)
- John Butler
- Johnny Butler
- Josh Butler
- Keith Butler
- Kelly Butler
- Kevin Butler
- LeRoy Butler
- Malcolm Butler
- Mario Butler
- Matthew Butler
- Mike Butler
- Percy Butler
- Quincy Butler
- Rashad Butler
- Ray Butler
- Robb Butler
- Skip Butler
- Sol Butler
- Terry Butler
- Vernon Butler
- Victor Butler
- Harry Butsko
- Jake Butt
- Greg Buttle
- Eddie Butts
- Marion Butts
- Dave Butz
- Rich Buzin
- Bernard Buzyniski
- Kevin Byard
- Keith Byars
- Rick Byas
- Jeff Byers
- Ken Byers
- Scott Byers
- Nate Byham
- Frank Bykowski
- Joseph Byler
- Carrington Byndom
- Earnest Byner
- Josh Bynes
- Camryn Bynum
- Butler By'not'e
- Kenny Bynum
- Reggie Bynum
- Terrell Bynum
- Boris Byrd
- Butch Byrd
- Damiere Byrd
- Darryl Byrd
- Dennis Byrd (born 1946)
- Dennis Byrd (born 1966)
- Dominique Byrd
- Emanuel Byrd
- Gill Byrd
- Henry Byrd
- Isaac Byrd
- Israel Byrd
- Jairus Byrd
- LaRon Byrd
- Mac Byrd
- Richard Byrd
- Solomon Byrd
- Sylvester Byrd
- Shawn Byrdsong
- Bill Byrne
- Jake Byrne
- Carl Byrum
- Dion Byrum
