= List of NFL players (A) =

This is a list of players who have appeared in at least one regular season or postseason game in the National Football League (NFL), American Football League (AFL), or All-America Football Conference (AAFC) and have a last name that starts with "A". This list is accurate through the end of the 2025 NFL season.

== Aa–Ag ==
- Isaako Aaitui
- Israel Abanikanda
- Joe Abbey
- Faye Abbott
- Vince Abbott
- Jared Abbrederis
- Lou Abbruzzi
- Mehdi Abdesmad
- Karim Abdul-Jabbar
- Ameer Abdullah
- Hamza Abdullah
- Husain Abdullah
- Khalid Abdullah
- Rabih Abdullah
- Rahim Abdullah
- Yasir Abdullah
- Isa Abdul-Quddus
- Fred Abel
- Bud Abell
- Walter Abercrombie
- Micah Abernathy
- Cliff Aberson
- Victor Abiamiri
- Oday Aboushi
- Clifton Abraham
- Donnie Abraham
- John Abraham
- Robert Abraham
- Johnathan Abram
- Danny Abramowicz
- Sid Abramowitz
- Bobby Abrams
- Delrick Abrams
- Kevin Abrams
- Nate Abrams
- Kris Abrams-Draine
- George Abramson
- Dick Abrell
- Ray Abruzzese
- Frank Abruzzino
- Dick Absher
- De'Von Achane
- Steve Ache
- George Achica
- Sneeze Achiu
- Emmanuel Acho
- Sam Acho
- Bill Acker
- Kenneth Acker
- Rick Ackerman
- Tom Ackerman
- Ron Acks
- Fred Acorn
- Ed Adamchik
- Mike Adamle
- Tony Adamle
- Andrew Adams
- Anthony Adams
- Bill Adams
- Blue Adams
- Bob Adams
- Brent Adams
- Charlie Adams
- Chet Adams
- Curtis Adams
- Darvin Adams
- Davante Adams
- David Adams
- Doug Adams
- Earnest Adams
- Flozell Adams
- Gaines Adams
- George Adams
- Henry Adams
- Isaiah Adams
- Jamal Adams
- Jamar Adams
- Jeff Adams
- Jerell Adams
- Joe Adams
- John Adams (born 1921)
- John Adams (born 1937)
- Johnny Adams
- Josh Adams
- Julius Adams
- Keith Adams
- Kris Adams
- Kyle Adams
- Matthew Adams
- Michael Adams (born 1964)
- Michael Adams (born 1985)
- Mike Adams (born 1974)
- Mike Adams (born 1981)
- Mike Adams (born 1990)
- Montravius Adams
- Myles Adams
- O'Neal Adams
- Pete Adams
- Phillip Adams
- Rodney Adams
- Sam Adams Sr.
- Sam Adams
- Scott Adams
- Stan Adams
- Stefon Adams
- Theo Adams
- Titus Adams
- Tom Adams
- Tony Adams (born 1950)
- Tony Adams (born 1999)
- Tyrell Adams
- Vashone Adams
- Verlin Adams
- Willie Adams
- Willis Adams
- Ken Adamson
- Jahleel Addae
- Joseph Addai
- Abe Addams
- Herb Adderley
- Nasir Adderley
- Tucker Addington
- Bralon Addison
- Jordan Addison
- Mario Addison
- Tom Addison
- Nick Adduci
- Adetomiwa Adebawore
- Paulson Adebo
- Quincy Adeboyejo
- Hakeem Adeniji
- Ola Adeniyi
- Aaron Adeoye
- Victor Adeyanju
- Xavier Adibi
- John Adickes
- Mark Adickes
- Jude Adjei-Barimah
- Bob Adkins
- Kevin Adkins
- Margene Adkins
- Nate Adkins
- Roy Adkins
- Sam Adkins
- Spencer Adkins
- James Adkisson
- Cal Adomitis
- Daniel Adongo
- Al Afalava
- Erik Affholter
- Dick Afflis
- Ben Agajanian
- Alex Agase
- Louis Age
- Mel Agee
- Sam Agee
- Tommie Agee
- Nelson Agholor
- McTelvin Agim
- Bob Agler
- Jamal Agnew
- Ray Agnew
- Ray Agnew III
- Vince Agnew
- Roberto Aguayo
- Mitchell Agude
- Louie Aguiar
- Joe Aguirre

== Ah–Ali ==
- C. J. Ah You
- Chidi Ahanotu
- Dan Ahern
- Ramiz Ahmed
- Salvon Ahmed
- Dave Ahrens
- Tony Aiello
- Danny Aiken
- Kamar Aiken
- Sam Aiken
- Carl Aikens Jr.
- Walt Aikens
- Troy Aikman
- Jim Ailinger
- Charles Aiu
- Victor Aiyewa
- Brandon Aiyuk
- Jay Ajayi
- Austin Ajiake
- Seyi Ajirotutu
- Hakim Akbar
- Cam Akers
- David Akers
- Landen Akers
- Harold Akin
- Len Akin
- Alex Akingbulu
- Freedom Akinmoladun
- Al Akins
- Chris Akins
- Frank Akins
- Jordan Akins
- Mike Akiu
- Anthony Alabi
- Otaro Alaka
- Ikaika Alama-Francis
- Dick Alban
- Dom Albanese
- Vannie Albanese
- Tom Alberghini
- Branden Albert
- Frankie Albert
- Sergio Albert
- Trev Alberts
- Art Albrecht
- Ted Albrecht
- Alex Albright
- Bill Albright
- Bryson Albright
- Ethan Albright
- Ira Albright
- Vince Albritton
- Zac Alcorn
- Grady Alderman
- John Alderton
- Ki Aldrich
- Allen Aldridge (born 1944)
- Allen Aldridge (born 1972)
- Ben Aldridge
- Jerry Aldridge
- Kevin Aldridge
- Lionel Aldridge
- Melvin Aldridge
- Arnold Ale
- Ink Aleaga
- Keith Alex
- Steve Alexakos
- Adonis Alexander
- Brent Alexander
- Bruce Alexander
- Charles Alexander
- D. J. Alexander
- Dan Alexander (born 1955)
- Dan Alexander (born 1978)
- Danario Alexander
- Darius Alexander
- David Alexander
- Derrick Alexander (born 1971)
- Derrick Alexander (born 1973)
- Doc Alexander
- Dominique Alexander
- Elijah Alexander
- Eric Alexander
- Frank Alexander
- Gerald Alexander
- Glenn Alexander
- Harold Alexander
- Jaire Alexander
- Jeff Alexander
- John Alexander (born 1896)
- John Alexander (born 1955)
- Kermit Alexander
- Kevin Alexander (born 1975)
- Kevin Alexander (born 1987)
- Kwon Alexander
- Lorenzo Alexander
- Mackensie Alexander
- Maurice Alexander (born 1991)
- Maurice Alexander (born 1997)
- Mike Alexander
- Mister Alexander
- P. J. Alexander
- Patrise Alexander
- Ray Alexander
- Robert Alexander
- Roc Alexander
- Rogers Alexander
- Rufus Alexander
- Shaun Alexander
- Stephen Alexander
- Vadal Alexander
- Vincent Alexander
- Willie Alexander
- Alton Alexis
- Rich Alexis
- Ted Alflen
- Jules Alfonse
- Brian Alford
- Bruce Alford Jr.
- Bruce Alford Sr.
- Darnell Alford
- Dee Alford
- Gene Alford
- Jay Alford
- Lynwood Alford
- Mario Alford
- Mike Alford
- Robert Alford
- Warren Alfson
- Charles Ali
- Josh Ali
- Rasheen Ali
- Mo Alie-Cox
- Tuineau Alipate

== All–Am ==
- Erick All
- Don Allard
- Raúl Allegre
- Nick Allegretti
- Andy Alleman
- Anthony Allen (born 1988)
- Anthony Allen (born 1959)
- Antonio Allen
- Armando Allen
- Asher Allen
- Beau Allen
- Braelon Allen
- Brandon Allen
- Brevin Allen
- Brian Allen (born 1978)
- Brian Allen (born 1980)
- Brian Allen (born 1993)
- Brian Allen (born 1995)
- Buddy Allen
- Carl Allen (born 1920)
- Carl Allen (born 1955)
- Chase Allen (born 1993)
- Chase Allen (born 1997)
- Chuck Allen
- Cortez Allen
- Dakota Allen
- Dalva Allen
- David Allen
- Davis Allen
- Derek Allen
- Devon Allen
- Don Allen
- Doug Allen
- Duane Allen
- Dwayne Allen
- Earl Allen
- Ed Allen
- Eddie Allen
- Egypt Allen
- Eric Allen
- Ermal Allen
- Gary Allen
- George Allen
- Gerry Allen
- Grady Allen
- Greg Allen
- Harvey Allen
- Ian Allen
- Jackie Allen
- Jake Allen
- James Allen (born 1979)
- James Allen (born 1975)
- Jared Allen
- Jason Allen
- Javorius Allen
- Jeff Allen (born 1990)
- Jeff Allen (born 1948)
- Jeff Allen (born 1958)
- Jimmy Allen
- Johnny Allen
- Jonathan Allen
- Josh Allen (born 1991)
- Josh Allen (born 1996)
- Keenan Allen
- Kenderick Allen
- Kevin Allen
- Kyle Allen
- Larry Allen
- LeQuint Allen
- Lou Allen
- Lynn Allen
- Marcus Allen (born 1960)
- Marcus Allen (born 1996)
- Marvin Allen
- Matt Allen
- Nate Allen (born 1948)
- Nate Allen (born 1987)
- Patrick Allen
- RaShaun Allen
- Ricardo Allen
- Roger Allen III
- Russell Allen
- Ryan Allen
- Taje Allen
- Terry Allen
- Tremayne Allen
- Will Allen (born 1978)
- Will Allen (born 1982)
- Zach Allen
- Kurt Allerman
- Ty Allert
- Don Alley
- Tyler Allgeier
- Aundrae Allison
- Geronimo Allison
- Hank Allison
- Jim Allison
- Neely Allison
- Buddy Alliston
- Bob Allman
- Brian Allred
- Colin Allred
- John Allred
- Joe Allton
- Jeff Alm
- Beau Almodobar
- Kiko Alonso
- Gerald Alphin
- Azeez Al-Shaair
- Jon Alston
- Lyneal Alston
- Mack Alston
- O'Brien Alston
- Richard Alston
- Mike Alstott
- Joe Alt
- John Alt
- Jim Althoff
- Tyson Alualu
- Auzoyah Alufohai
- Wilson Alvarez
- Steve Alvers
- Steve Alvord
- Tom Alward
- Lance Alworth
- Lyle Alzado
- Ugo Amadi
- Eugene Amano
- Jace Amaro
- Ken Amato
- Jonathon Amaya
- John Amberg
- Ashley Ambrose
- Dick Ambrose
- John Ambrose
- Walt Ambrose
- Alan Ameche
- Kiran Amegadjie
- Danny Amendola
- David Amerson
- Glen Amerson
- David Ames
- Otis Amey
- Vince Amey
- Richard Amman
- Matt Ammendola
- Adrian Amos
- Trey Amos
- Marty Amsler
- Joe Amstutz
- Prince Amukamara
- Norm Amundsen
- George Amundson

== An ==
- Bradlee Anae
- Vito Ananis
- Tremayne Anchrum
- Rudy Andabaker
- Kimble Anders
- Jason Andersen
- Morten Andersen
- Stan Andersen
- Troy Andersen
- Anderson
- Abdullah Anderson
- Alec Anderson (born 1894)
- Alec Anderson (born 1999)
- Alfred Anderson
- André Anderson
- Anthony Anderson (born 1956)
- Anthony Anderson (born 1964)
- Antonio Anderson
- Aric Anderson
- Art Anderson
- Bennie Anderson
- Bill Anderson (born 1921)
- Bill Anderson (born 1936)
- Billy Anderson (born 1929)
- Billy Anderson (born 1941)
- Bob Anderson
- Bobby Anderson
- Brad Anderson
- Brandon Anderson
- Bruce Anderson
- Bryan Anderson
- Calvin Anderson
- C. J. Anderson
- Charlie Anderson (born 1933)
- Charlie Anderson (born 1981)
- Chet Anderson
- Cliff Anderson
- Colt Anderson
- Courtney Anderson
- Curtis Anderson (born 1957)
- Curtis Anderson (born 1973)
- Damien Anderson
- Darren Anderson
- David Anderson
- Deon Anderson
- Derek Anderson
- Dick Anderson (born 1944)
- Dick Anderson (born 1946)
- Don Anderson
- Donny Anderson
- Dunstan Anderson
- Dwayne Anderson
- Dwight Anderson
- Eddie Anderson (born 1900)
- Eddie Anderson (born 1963)
- Erick Anderson
- Evan Anderson
- Flipper Anderson
- Fred Anderson
- Gary Anderson (born 1955)
- Gary Anderson (born 1959)
- Gary Anderson (born 1961)
- Henry Anderson
- Herbie Anderson
- Hunk Anderson
- Jack Anderson
- Jamaal Anderson
- Jamal Anderson
- James Anderson
- Jason Anderson
- Jerry Anderson
- Jesse Anderson
- John Anderson
- Jonathan Anderson
- Joseph Anderson (American football)
- Justin Anderson
- Ken Anderson (born 1949)
- Ken Anderson (born 1975)
- Kim Anderson
- Larry Anderson
- Liam Anderson
- Marcus Anderson
- Mark Anderson
- Marques Anderson
- Max Anderson
- Mel Anderson
- Mike Anderson
- Neal Anderson
- Ockie Anderson
- Ottis Anderson
- Paul Anderson
- Preston Anderson
- Ralph Anderson (born 1936)
- Ralph Anderson (born 1949)
- Rashard Anderson
- Richie Anderson
- Rickey Anderson
- Roger Anderson
- Ronnie Anderson
- Ryan Anderson
- Ryder Anderson
- Scott Anderson
- Scotty Anderson
- Spencer Anderson
- Stephen Anderson
- Stevie Anderson
- Stuart Anderson
- Sugarfoot Anderson
- Taz Anderson
- Terry Anderson
- Tim Anderson (born 1949)
- Tim Anderson (born 1980)
- Tycen Anderson
- Vickey Ray Anderson
- Vince Anderson
- Warren Anderson
- Will Anderson
- Will Anderson Jr.
- Willie Anderson
- Winnie Anderson
- Zaire Anderson
- Zayne Anderson
- Eric Andolsek
- Steve Andrako
- Joe Andreessen
- Troy Andrew
- Al Andrews
- Antonio Andrews
- Billy Andrews
- David Andrews
- George Andrews
- Jaby Andrews
- Jake Andrews
- John Andrews (born 1948)
- John Andrews (born 1951)
- Josh Andrews
- LeRoy Andrews
- Mark Andrews
- Mitch Andrews
- Ricky Andrews
- Shawn Andrews
- Stacy Andrews
- Tom Andrews
- William Andrews
- Willie Andrews
- George Andrie
- Plato Andros
- Teddy Andrulewicz
- Lou Andrus
- Shane Andrus
- Sheldon Andrus
- Sig Andrusking
- Zenon Andrusyshyn
- Joe Andruzzi
- Charlie Ane Jr.
- Charlie Ane III
- Mark Anelli
- Jim Angelo
- Bryan Anger
- Pat Angerer
- Elmer Angsman
- Richard Angulo
- Eli Ankou
- Jason Ankrah
- Scott Ankrom
- Dunc Annan
- Blake Annen
- Sam Anno
- Ezekiel Ansah
- Charles Anthony
- Cornelius Anthony
- Daijahn Anthony
- Reidel Anthony
- Stephone Anthony
- Terrence Anthony
- Terry Anthony
- Tyrone Anthony
- Lionel Antoine
- Glenn Antrum
- Houston Antwine
- Felix Anudike-Uzomah
- Kenny Anunike
- Chigozie Anusiem
- Alex Anzalone

== Ap–As ==
- Steve Apke
- Troy Apke
- Chuck Apolskis
- Ray Apolskis
- Eli Apple
- Jim Apple
- Clarence Applegran
- Scott Appleton
- Antwan Applewhite
- Marger Apsit
- Ben Apuna
- Leo Araguz
- Matt Araiza
- Evan Arapostathis
- Fred Arbanas
- Hasson Arbubakrr
- Charles Arbuckle
- J. J. Arcega-Whiteside
- Emmanuel Arceneaux
- Lester Archambeau
- Brandon Archer
- Dan Archer
- David Archer
- Dri Archer
- Troy Archer
- Ben Archibald
- Daniel Archibong
- Mike Archie
- Julie Archoska
- Adam Archuleta
- A. J. Arcuri
- Billy Ard
- Tony Ardizzone
- Tony Arena
- Javier Arenas
- Joe Arenas
- Arnie Arenz
- Bob Argus
- David Ariail
- Jake Arians
- Mike Ariey
- Obed Ariri
- David Arkin
- Alex Armah
- Thurston Armbrister
- JoJuan Armour
- Justin Armour
- Phil Armour
- Jalyn Armour-Davis
- Loyd Arms
- Arik Armstead
- Jessie Armstead
- Ryquell Armstead
- Terron Armstead
- Adger Armstrong
- Anthony Armstrong
- Antonio Armstrong
- Bill Armstrong
- Bob Armstrong
- Bruce Armstrong
- Charlie Armstrong
- Cornell Armstrong
- Derick Armstrong
- Dorance Armstrong
- Graham Armstrong
- Harvey Armstrong
- Jimmy Armstrong
- John Armstrong
- Johnny Armstrong
- Neill Armstrong
- Norris Armstrong
- Otis Armstrong
- Quincy Armstrong
- Ray Armstrong
- Ray-Ray Armstrong
- Trace Armstrong
- Tyji Armstrong
- Al Arndt
- Dick Arndt
- Jim Arneson
- Mark Arneson
- Jon Arnett
- Damon Arnette
- Brian Arnfelt
- Dan Arnold
- David Arnold
- Grayland Arnold
- Jahine Arnold
- Jay Arnold
- Jim Arnold
- John Arnold
- LeFrancis Arnold
- Terrion Arnold
- Walt Arnold
- Stanley Arnoux
- Devin Aromashodu
- Doug Aronson
- John Arp
- Adrian Arrington
- J. J. Arrington
- Kyle Arrington
- LaVar Arrington
- Rick Arrington
- Chuck Arrobio
- Arrowhead
- Elijah Arroyo
- Elmer Arterburn
- Gary Arthur
- Mike Arthur
- Cameron Artis-Payne
- Corrie Artman
- Rodney Artmore
- Lee Artoe
- Herman Arvie
- Doug Asad
- Brian Asamoah
- Jon Asamoah
- Larry Asante
- Willie Asbury
- Darrel Aschbacher
- Frank Aschenbrenner
- Juddy Ash
- Bill Ashbaugh
- Cliff Ashburn
- Julian Ashby
- Richard Ash
- Richard Ashe
- Bob Asher
- Jamie Asher
- Walker Lee Ashley
- Darryl Ashmore
- Marion Ashmore
- Josh Ashton
- Tom Ashworth
- Devin Asiasi
- Isaac Asiata
- Johan Asiata
- Matt Asiata
- K. C. Asiodu
- Joe Aska
- Mike Askea
- B. J. Askew
- Matthias Askew
- Bert Askson
- Jim Asmus
- Nnamdi Asomugha
- Ed Aspatore
- Mark Asper
- Les Asplundh

== At–Az ==
- Jack Atchason
- Burl Atcheson
- Tim Atchison
- Marcell Ateman
- Bill Atessis
- Pete Athas
- Dale Atkeson
- Baraka Atkins
- Billy Atkins
- Bob Atkins
- Corey Atkins
- Dave Atkins
- Doug Atkins
- Gene Atkins
- Geno Atkins
- George Atkins
- James Atkins (born 1978)
- James Atkins (born 1971)
- John Atkins
- Kelvin Atkins
- Larry Atkins
- Pervis Atkins
- Steve Atkins
- Al Atkinson
- Frank Atkinson
- George Atkinson
- George Atkinson III
- Jess Atkinson
- Ricky Atkinson
- Oshiomogho Atogwe
- Reggie Attache
- Jeremiah Attaochu
- Alex Atty
- Steve Atwater
- Tutu Atwell
- John Atwood
- Brandon Aubrey
- Josh Aubrey
- Antony Auclair
- Earl Audet
- Dan Audick
- Howie Auer
- Jim Auer
- Joe Auer
- Scott Auer
- Todd Auer
- Dowe Aughtman
- Sky August
- Steve August
- Gene Augusterfer
- Mike Augustyniak
- Chalmer Ault
- Malaesala Aumavae–Laulu
- David Aupiu
- David Ausberry
- Alex Austin
- Bill Austin
- Billy Austin
- Blessuan Austin
- Calvin Austin
- Cliff Austin
- Darrell Austin
- Eric Austin
- Hise Austin
- James Austin
- Kent Austin
- Kevin Austin
- Marvin Austin
- Miles Austin
- Ocie Austin
- Ray Austin
- Reggie Austin
- Rodney Austin
- Tavon Austin
- Terrence Austin
- Thomas Austin
- Billy Autrey
- Darnell Autry
- Denico Autry
- Hank Autry
- Troy Auzenne
- Jason Avant
- Chuck Avedisian
- Bob Avellini
- John Aveni
- Anthony Averett
- Sisto Averno
- Don Avery
- Donnie Avery
- Genard Avery
- Jim Avery
- John Avery
- Ken Avery
- Steve Avery
- Tre Avery
- Joe Avezzano
- Steve Avila
- Butch Avinger
- Cliff Avril
- Rob Awalt
- Adrian Awasom
- Kayode Awosika
- Chidobe Awuzie
- Brendon Ayanbadejo
- Obafemi Ayanbadejo
- Buddy Aydelette
- Akeem Ayers
- Demarcus Ayers
- John Ayers
- Marvin Ayers
- Robert Ayers
- Kole Ayi
- Akin Ayodele
- Remi Ayodele
- Elic Ayomanor
- Joe Azelby
- Jerry Azumah
