= Herschel Currie =

American gridiron football player (born 1965)

No. 8, 24
- Position: Defensive back

Personal information
- Born: September 8, 1965 (age 61); Chicago, Illinois, U.S.
- Listed height: 6 ft 0 in (1.83 m)
- Listed weight: 190 lb (86 kg)

Career information
- High school: Yerba Buena (CA)
- College: Chabot, Oregon State
- NFL draft: 1994: undrafted

Career history
- San Diego Chargers (1994)*; Arizona Cardinals (1994); Sacramento Gold Miners (1994); BC Lions (1995)*; San Jose SaberCats (1997–1999); Grand Rapids Rampage (1999)
- * Offseason or practice squad member only

Career NFL statistics
- Games played: 1
- Stats at Pro Football Reference

Career CFL statistics
- Games played: 3
- Tackles: 4

Career AFL statistics
- Games played: 14
- Tackles: 78
- Interceptions: 10
- Interception yards: 24

Herschel Lamont Currie (born September 8, 1965) is an American former gridiron football defensive back who played one season in the National Football League (NFL) for the Arizona Cardinals, one season in the Canadian Football League (CFL) for the Sacramento Gold Miners, and three seasons in the Arena Football League (AFL) for the San Jose SaberCats. He played college football at Chabot Junior College and Oregon State.

== Early life and education ==
Currie was born on September 8, 1965, in Chicago, Illinois. He attended Yerba Buena High School in California, but did not play football. He instead was interested in music, and also played one season on their basketball team.

After graduating from high school, Currie played in a band called "Nonstop", and won several talent shows for "street popping", a form of "robotic dancing". He also worked many "odd jobs" in the Silicon Valley-area. He served as a mail clerk, a materials handler, and a part department supervisor, in addition to various other roles.

In 1987, Currie played for the Maxtor company flag football team. His friends convinced him to try out for San Jose City College, but he was released three weeks into training camp. He tried out again the following year, but quit. He later showed up at a Chabot Junior College football practice. "Time was just going by," he later said. "But I wanted to do it so bad." The coaches considered him talented, and invited him to stay. In his first season, he caught 18 passes for 435 yards at wide receiver. Currie sat out his sophomore year with a knee injury, and changed his position to defensive back.

After running the 100-meter dash in 10.7 seconds and the 40-yard dash in 4.42, a defensive back school record, Currie received attention from college recruiters. He accepted an offer from Oregon State University in 1992, earning a varsity letter in his first year.

At 28 years old to start his senior year, Currie was nicknamed "Daddy" by some teammates. After giving up big games against UCLA, Stanford, and Washington, Currie rebounded in a 15–12 win over University of Oregon by returning an interception from 45 yards out all the way for a touchdown.

Currie returned three total interceptions in 1993, and finished his college career by playing in the Blue-Gray Game for college seniors.

He graduated from Oregon State with a degree in housing design.

== Professional career ==
After going unselected in the 1994 NFL draft, Currie was signed by the San Diego Chargers as an undrafted free agent, despite being a 28-year-old rookie. He was waived by the Chargers on August 22.

Currie was signed by the Arizona Cardinals on September 6 to the practice squad. He was promoted to the active roster prior to their game against the Cleveland Browns. After making a costly pass interference call in the game, he was released one day later.

Currie later signed with the Sacramento Gold Miners of the Canadian Football League (CFL). He appeared in three games during the 1994 season, making four tackles. He was signed by the BC Lions early in 1995, but announced his retirement in June.

After not playing in the 1995 or 1996 seasons, Currie came out of retirement to play for the San Jose SaberCats of the Arena Football League (AFL) in 1997. He made a total of 44.5 tackles and eight interceptions during the season. In 1998, he played in two games before suffering a season-ending injury, in which, he recorded 7.5 tackles and two interceptions. He played in two games again during the 1999 season, before being placed on season-ending injured reserve for the second consecutive year.

Currie was acquired by the Grand Rapids Rampage for "future considerations", in June 1999, before announcing his retirement.
