= Bobby Kellogg =

American football player (1917–1985)

- Kellogg in 1940

Profile
- Position: Halfback

Personal information
- Born: August 4, 1917; Wynne, Arkansas
- Died: May 9, 1985 (aged 67); Columbus, Mississippi
- Listed height: 5 ft 8 in (1.73 m)
- Listed weight: 165 lb (75 kg)

Career information
- High school: Wynne (AR)
- College: Louisiana-Monroe, Tulane

Career history
- Chicago Cardinals (1940)
- Stats at Pro Football Reference

Robert Francis "Jitterbug" Kellogg (August 4, 1917 – May 9, 1985) was an American football player and coach. He played college football for Northeast Center of Louisiana State University (now known as University of Louisiana at Monroe) in 1936 and 1937 and Tulane in 1938 and 1939. He also played professional football for the Chicago Cardinals in 1940. He later held coaching positions with Tulane, Wake Forest, Texas Tech, Mississippi State, Memphis State, Edmonton, and Regina.

== Early life ==
Kellogg was born in 1917 at Wynne, Arkansas. He attended Wynne High School, playing as a pitcher in baseball, quarterback in football, and forward in basketball.

== College football ==
Kellogg began his collegiate career at Northeast Center of Louisiana State University (now known as University of Louisiana at Monroe). He was a triple-threat halfback and most valuable player for the 1936 Northeast Center Indians football team. He scored 12 touchdowns and 11 extra points for the undefeated 1937 team.

Kellogg transferred to Tulane where he starred for the Tulane football teams in 1938 and 1939. He led the 1939 Tulane Green Wave football team to an undefeated regular season and a Southeastern Conference championship. In the 1940 Sugar Bowl, Kellogg ran 75 yards for a touchdown; Kellogg called the run the greatest thrill of his life.

== Professional football ==
Kellogg played professional football in the National Football League (NFL) for the Chicago Cardinals during the 1940 season. He played in the 1940 College All Star game where he rushed for two touchdowns and passed for another. He also played for the Jersey City Giants for seven games in 1940.

== Military service and coaching career ==
During World War II, Kellogg served in the U.S. Navy. He also worked as a football coach, including stints with Tulane (1941-1942), Wake Forest (backfield coach, 1946-1949), Texas Tech (backfield coach, 1953), Mississippi State (1954-1958), Memphis State (backfield coach 1959), Edmonton (backfield coach, 1960-1962), and Regina (1965).

Kellogg died in 1985 in Columbus, Mississippi.
