= Fred DeStefano =

American football player (1900–1974)

Frederick Walter DeStefano
Profile
- Position: Running back

Personal information
- Born: April 4, 1900; Coal City, Illinois, U.S.
- Died: June 27, 1974 (aged 74); Houston, Texas, U.S.

Career information
- College: Princeton University

Career history
- 1924–1925: Chicago Cardinals

Fred DeStefano (April 4, 1900 – June 27, 1974) was an American professional football player who was a running back for two seasons for the Chicago Cardinals. After retiring from football, he became a physician, and died in Houston, Texas in 1974 of multiple organ failure.
