= Lyons Kelliher =

American football player and police detective (1903–1956)

- Kelliher in the 1950s

No. 19
- Positions: End, guard

Personal information
- Born: August 11, 1903; Chicago, Illinois, U.S.
- Died: January 25, 1956 (aged 52); Chicago, Illinois, U.S.

Career information
- College: none

Career history
- Chicago Cardinals (1928)

Career statistics
- Games played: 1
- Stats at Pro Football Reference

Edward Lyons Kelliher (August 11, 1903 – January 25, 1956) was an American football player and police detective.

Kelliher was born on August 11, 1903, in Chicago, Illinois, the son of police captain and lieutenant Patrick Kelliher. He did not attend college.

In 1928, at the age of 25, he was signed to play professional football by the Chicago Cardinals of the National Football League (NFL). He played the end and guard positions, and appeared in one game with the team.

He later became a police detective in Chicago. He died on January 25, 1956, at the age of 52, after being shot and killed during an investigation.

He and his partner were at the Boulevard Hotel in Chicago during a narcotics investigation. They were arresting two wanted men and searching them for weapons when one pulled out a .38 caliber pistol and started firing, then fled. Kelliher was shot twice in the chest and his partner was hit in the hand. They were both rushed to the Illinois Research Hospital, where Kelliher later died of his wounds.
