= Don Hill (American football) =

American football player (1904–1967)

No. 6, 14
- Positions: Tailback, halfback, center, wingback

Personal information
- Born: September 18, 1904; Hiawatha, Kansas, U.S.
- Died: February 9, 1967 (aged 62); Glendale, California, U.S.
- Listed height: 5 ft 10 in (1.78 m)
- Listed weight: 175 lb (79 kg)

Career information
- High school: Polytechnic (Long Beach, California)
- College: Stanford

Career history
- 1929: Chicago Cardinals
- 1929: Green Bay Packers

Awards and highlights
- NFL champion (1929)
- Stats at Pro Football Reference

Donald Kinman Hill (September 18, 1904 – February 9, 1967) was an American football player. He played in the National Football League (NFL) during the 1929 season with the Chicago Cardinals and the Green Bay Packers.
