= Irv Hill =

American football player (1908–1978)

Profile
- Position: Running back

Personal information
- Born: December 8, 1908; Fort Worth, Texas, United States
- Died: November 7, 1978 (aged 69)

Career information
- College: Trinity

Career history
- 1931–1932: Chicago Cardinals
- 1933: Boston Redskins
- Stats at Pro Football Reference

Irvin Pate Hill (December 8, 1908 – November 7, 1978) was an American football running back in the National Football League for the Chicago Cardinals and Boston Redskins. He attended Trinity University.
