= Hal Bradley =

American football player (1913–1981)

No. 38
- Position: End

Personal information
- Born: November 23, 1913; Winston-Salem, North Carolina, U.S.
- Died: June 14, 1981 (aged 67); Lillington, North Carolina, U.S.

Career information
- College: Elon

Career history
- 1938–1939: Washington Redskins
- 1939: Chicago Cardinals
- Stats at Pro Football Reference

Eugene Harold Bradley (November 23, 1913 – June 14, 1981) was an American football end in the National Football League for the Washington Redskins and the Chicago Cardinals. He played college football at Elon University.
