= Gil Bergerson =

American football player (1910–1987)

Gilbert Bergerson
Profile
- Position: Guard / Tackle

Personal information
- Born: July 19, 1910; Vernonia, Oregon, U.S.
- Died: October 18, 1987 (aged 77); Corvallis, Oregon, U.S.

Career information
- College: Oregon State

Career history
- Chicago Bears (1932); Chicago Cardinals (1933); Chicago Bears (1933); Brooklyn Dodgers (1935–1936)

Awards and highlights
- 2× NFL champion (1932, 1933)

Charles Gilbert Bergerson (July 19, 1910 – October 18, 1987) was an American professional football player who played in the National Football League (NFL) from 1932 to 1936. He played college football for Oregon State University and played for three NFL teams in 39 games over 4 seasons.
