= Ron Bohm =

American football player (born 1964)

No. 78
- Position: Defensive tackle

Personal information
- Born: September 3, 1964 (age 62); Princeton, Illinois, U.S.
- Listed height: 6 ft 3 in (1.91 m)
- Listed weight: 250 lb (113 kg)

Career information
- High school: Walnut (IL)
- College: Illinois
- NFL draft: 1987: undrafted

Career history
- Seattle Seahawks (1987)*; St. Louis Cardinals (1987)*; Atlanta Falcons (1988)*
- * Offseason or practice squad member only
- Stats at Pro Football Reference

Ronald Leland Bohm (born September 3, 1964) is an American former professional football defensive tackle who played one season for the St. Louis Cardinals. He was a replacement player.

Pre-draft measurables
Height	Weight	Arm length	Hand span	40-yard dash	10-yard split	20-yard split	20-yard shuttle	Vertical jump	Broad jump	Bench press
6 ft 2 5/8 in (1.90 m)	254 lb (115 kg)	31 1/4 in (0.79 m)	8 3/4 in (0.22 m)	5.12 s	1.74 s	2.93 s	4.54 s	24.5 in (0.62 m)	8 ft 7 in (2.62 m)	13 reps
All values from NFL Combine
