= Wayne Bock =

American football player (1934–2016)

No. 78
- Position: Defensive tackle

Personal information
- Born: May 28, 1934; Third River Twp., Minnesota, U.S.
- Died: September 11, 2016 (aged 82); Fond du Lac, Wisconsin, U.S.
- Listed height: 6 ft 4 in (1.93 m)
- Listed weight: 265 lb (120 kg)

Career information
- High school: Argo (IL)
- College: Illinois
- NFL draft: 1957: 5th round, 58th overall pick

Career history
- Chicago Cardinals (1957)

Career NFL statistics
- Games played: 4
- Stats at Pro Football Reference

Wayne R. Bock Jr. (May 28, 1934 – September 11, 2016) was an American professional football player who played for the Chicago Cardinals of the National Football League (NFL). He played college football at the University of Illinois at Urbana–Champaign.
