= Homer Bliss =

American football player (1904–1970)

Homer Clisson Bliss
Profile
- Position: Guard

Personal information
- Born: August 16, 1904; Beaverton, Michigan, U.S.
- Died: April 1970 (aged 65)
- Listed height: 5 ft 11 in (1.80 m)
- Listed weight: 196 lb (89 kg)

Career information
- College: Washington & Jefferson College

Career history
- Chicago Cardinals (1928)
- Stats at Pro Football Reference

Homer Clisson Bliss (August 16, 1904 – April 1970) was an American professional football player for the Chicago Cardinals. He attended Washington & Jefferson College, where he played center for the football team. When he graduated in 1927, The Pittsburgh Press said that he was "likely to be the worst-missed player in years."

== Notes ==
- Career statistics from NFL.com · Pro Football Reference ·
