= Jarvis Borum =

American football player (born 1978)

No. 61
- Positions: Offensive guard, offensive tackle

Personal information
- Born: September 16, 1978 (age 48); Columbia, South Carolina, U.S.
- Listed height: 6 ft 7 in (2.01 m)
- Listed weight: 324 lb (147 kg)

Career information
- High school: W.J. Keenan (SC)
- College: NC State
- NFL draft: 2001: undrafted

Career history
- Arizona Cardinals (2001–2002); Scottish Claymores (2002); Cleveland Browns (2002)*; Miami Dolphins (2003)
- * Offseason or practice squad member only

Career NFL statistics
- Games played: 1
- Stats at Pro Football Reference

Jarvis Borum (born September 16, 1978) is an American former professional football player who was an offensive guard and tackle for one season with the Arizona Cardinals of the National Football League (NFL). He played college football for the NC State Wolfpack and was signed as an undrafted free agent by the Cardinals in 2001.

== Early life and education ==
Borum was born on September 16, 1978. He attended high school at W. J. Keenan (SC) and college at NC State.

== Professional career ==
Pre-draft measurables
Height	Weight	Hand span	40-yard dash	10-yard split	20-yard split	20-yard shuttle	Three-cone drill	Vertical jump	Broad jump	Bench press
6 ft 7 in (2.01 m)	332 lb (151 kg)	10 in (0.25 m)	5.04 s	1.76 s	3.00 s	4.83 s	8.08 s	30.5 in (0.77 m)	8 ft 11 in (2.72 m)	25 reps
All values from NFL Scouting Combine

Arizona Cardinals

Borum was signed as an undrafted free-agent on April 23, 2001. Ironically, he was listed as a guard and never played a snap of guard in high school or college. He was released on November 6. He was then signed to the practice squad the next day. In 2001 he played 1 game. In 2002 he did not make the Cardinals roster, due to burnout from forced allocation to the NFL EUROPE.

Scottish Claymores

Borum played for the Scottish Claymores in 2002 and was named 2002 Official All-NFLE.

Cleveland Browns

In September 2002 he was signed to the practice squad of the Cleveland Browns. He was released two weeks later.

Miami Dolphins

He was signed by the Miami Dolphins but did not make the roster due to injury. In his career he played one game.
