= Joe Allton =

American football player (1920–1989)

No. 44
- Position: Tackle

Personal information
- Born: September 7, 1920 (age 106); Claremore, Oklahoma, U.S.
- Died: February 26, 1989 (aged 68); Claremore, Oklahoma, U.S.
- Listed height: 6 ft 2 in (1.88 m)
- Listed weight: 235 lb (107 kg)

Career information
- High school: Claremore
- College: Oklahoma (1939–1941)
- NFL draft: 1942: undrafted

Career history
- Chicago Cardinals (1942); Chicago Cardinals (1946)*
- * Offseason or practice squad member only
- Stats at Pro Football Reference

Joseph J. Allton (September 7, 1920 – February 26, 1989) was an American professional football tackle who played for the Chicago Cardinals of the National Football League (NFL). He played college football for the Oklahoma Sooners.

== Early life ==
Joseph J. Allton was born on September 7, 1920, in Claremore, Oklahoma. He played high school football at Claremore High School, earning All-Verdigris Valley honorrs.

== College career ==
Allton played college football at Oklahoma Military Academy in 1938. It was originally believed that he would miss the 1938 season due to stomach ulcers but he ended up playing.

Allton transferred to the University of Oklahoma to play for the Sooners. He was on the freshman team in 1939 and was a two-year varsity letterman from 1940 to 1941. He suffered split cartilage during spring practice in 1941 and had to have surgery.

== Professional career ==
Allton went undrafted in the 1942 NFL draft. He played in all 11 games, starting three, at tackle for the Cardinals during the 1942 season and made one interception for 24 yards. After serving over three years in the United States Army during World War II, Allton signed with the Cardinals again in January 1946. However, he was later released.

== Personal life ==
Allton died on February 26, 1989, in Claremore. At the time of his death, he was the general manager at Major Leasing Co.
