= Dwayne Anderson (American football) =

American football player (born 1961)

No. 20
- Position: Defensive back

Personal information
- Born: December 7, 1961 (age 64); St. Louis, Missouri, U.S.
- Listed height: 6 ft 0 in (1.83 m)
- Listed weight: 205 lb (93 kg)

Career information
- High school: Roosevelt (St. Louis)
- College: SMU
- NFL draft: 1984: undrafted

Career history
- Tampa Bay Bandits (1984–1985); St. Louis Cardinals (1987)

Awards and highlights
- Second-team All-SWC (1983)
- Stats at Pro Football Reference

Dwayne Everett Anderson (born December 7, 1961) is an American former professional football player who was a defensive back for the St. Louis Cardinals of the National Football League (NFL) for one game in 1987. He played college football for the SMU Mustangs. He played for the Tampa Bay Bandits of the United States Football League (USFL) from 1984 to 1985. In 1985, he had four interceptions for 55 yards. Anderson had two of those interceptions in a 17–14 win versus the Birmingham Stallions on June 17 that clinched Tampa Bay's playoff berth.
