= Jason Banks (American football) =

American football player (born 1985)

No. 79
- Position: Defensive end

Personal information
- Born: May 8, 1985 (age 41); Baton Rouge, Louisiana, U.S.
- Listed height: 6 ft 5 in (1.96 m)
- Listed weight: 296 lb (134 kg)

Career information
- College: Grambling State
- NFL draft: 2008: undrafted

Career history
- Arizona Cardinals (2008–2009)

Career NFL statistics
- Tackles: 2
- Sacks: 1.0
- Stats at Pro Football Reference

Jason Ryan Banks (born May 8, 1985) is an American former professional football player who was a defensive end for the Arizona Cardinals of the National Football League (NFL). He was signed by the Cardinals as an undrafted free agent in 2008. He played college football for the Grambling State Tigers, and played his high school ball at McKinley Senior High School.
