= David Braden =

American football player (1917–1980)

David Braden (September 27, 1917 in Milwaukee, Wisconsin – August 2, 1980 in Milwaukee, Wisconsin) was a member of the Chicago Cardinals of the National Football League during the 1945 NFL season. He attended St. John's Cathedral High School in Milwaukee before playing at the collegiate level with the Marquette Golden Avalanche.
