= Mike Barnes (defensive back) =

American football player (born 1944)

No. 20
- Position: Defensive back

Personal information
- Born: December 30, 1944 (age 81); Denison, Texas, U.S.
- Listed height: 6 ft 3 in (1.91 m)
- Listed weight: 205 lb (93 kg)

Career information
- High school: Denison High School (Denison, TX)
- College: Texas-Arlington

Career history
- St. Louis Cardinals (1967–1968)

Career NFL statistics
- Games played: 17
- Interceptions: 0
- Tackles: 0
- Stats at Pro Football Reference

Micheal Howard Barnes (December 30, 1944) is an American former professional defensive back who played for Saint Louis Cardinals of the National Football League (NFL). He was drafted in the 4th round of the 1967 NFL draft, 97th overall. He also signed with the Pittsburgh Steelers and the Houston Oilers, but did not play with them.

== College career ==
Barnes played for Texas-Arlington in college.

== NFL career statistics ==
Year	Team	Games		Interceptions						Fumbles
Year	Team	GP	GS	Int	Yds	Avg	Lng	TDs	FR	
1967	STL	12	—	0	0	0.0	0	0	0	
1968	STL	5	—	0	0	0.0	0	0	0	
Career		17	—	0	0	0.0	0	0	0	
Source: Pro-Football-Reference.com
