= Frank Bohlmann =

American football player (1917–1999)

Profile
- Position: Guard

Personal information
- Born: January 26, 1917; Milwaukee, Wisconsin
- Died: October 24, 1999 (aged 82); Aurora, Colorado
- Listed height: 5 ft 11 in (1.80 m)
- Listed weight: 212 lb (96 kg)

Career information
- College: Marquette

Career history
- Chicago Cardinals (1942)

Career statistics
- Games played: 5
- Stats at Pro Football Reference

Frank Henry Bohlmann (1917–1999) was a guard in the National Football League. He played with the Chicago Cardinals during the 1942 NFL season.
