= Warren Anderson (American football) =

American football player (born 1955)

No. 83, 89
- Position: Wide receiver

Personal information
- Born: July 3, 1955 (age 71); Williamsburg, Virginia, U.S.
- Listed height: 6 ft 2 in (1.88 m)
- Listed weight: 195 lb (88 kg)

Career information
- High school: James Blair (Williamsburg)
- College: West Virginia State
- NFL draft: 1977: 4th round, 98th overall pick

Career history
- Houston Oilers (1977); St. Louis Cardinals (1978)
- Stats at Pro Football Reference

Warren Andrew Anderson (born July 3, 1955) is an American former professional football wide receiver who played two seasons in the National Football League (NFL) with the Houston Oilers and St. Louis Cardinals. He played college football at West Virginia State and was selected by the Oilers in the fourth round of the 1977 NFL draft.

== Early life and college ==
Warren Andrew Anderson was born on July 3, 1955, in Williamsburg, Virginia. He attended James Blair High School in Williamsburg.

Anderson was a member of the West Virginia State Yellow Jackets of West Virginia State College (later West Virginia State University) from 1973 to 1976. In August 1976, before the start of Anderson's senior year, it was reported that the Houston Oilers had shown strong interest in him. He was inducted into West Virginia State University's athletics hall of fame in 2005.

== Professional career ==
Anderson was selected by the Houston Oilers in the fourth round, with the 98th overall pick, of the 1977 NFL draft. He played in eight games for the Oilers during the 1977 season and returned eight kicks for 182 yards. He was the first person in West Virginia State University history to play in the NFL. Anderson was released on August 24, 1978.

Anderson signed with the St. Louis Cardinals on December 1, 1978. He appeared in two games for the Cardinals in 1978. He was released on June 25, 1979.
