= Ping Bodie (American football) =

Italian-born American football player (1896–1981)

Profile
- Position: Fullback

Personal information
- Born: May 10, 1896; Italy
- Died: December 14, 1981 (aged 85); Stockton, California, U.S.

Career history
- Chicago Cardinals (1921)

Career statistics
- Games Played: 1
- Stats at Pro Football Reference

M. Risso Bodie (May 10, 1896 – December 14, 1981) was an Italian professional American football fullback who played one season for the Chicago Cardinals of the National Football League (NFL). By playing in one game he became the first person born in Italy to ever play professionally.

Bodie was born on May 10, 1896, in Italy. Both his high school and college are unknown. In 1921, he became the first person born in Italy to play in an NFL game. He played in one game for the Chicago Cardinals (now known as the Arizona Cardinals) at the fullback position, gaining seven yards on five carries. He did not make any other appearances after the season. He died on December 14, 1981, in Stockton, California. He was 85 at the time of his death.
