= Chuck Brown (American football) =

American football player (born 1957)

No. 61
- Position: Center

Personal information
- Born: March 15, 1957 (age 69); Houston, Texas
- Listed height: 6 ft 1 in (1.85 m)
- Listed weight: 235 lb (107 kg)

Career information
- High school: Dulles
- College: Houston
- NFL draft: 1979: undrafted

Career history
- Houston Oilers (1979)*; St. Louis Cardinals (1979); San Antonio Gunslingers (1984); Tampa Bay Bandits (1985)
- * Offseason or practice squad member only
- Stats at Pro Football Reference

Charles Edward Brown (born March 15, 1957) is an American former professional football offensive lineman. He played 4 games for the St. Louis Cardinals of the National Football League (NFL) in 1979. He played college football for the University of Houston Cougars.

Brown played high school football at Dulles High School, where he was a defensive lineman. He was then the University of Houston Cougars' starting center for three seasons, 1976 through 1978. At the University of Houston, Brown was named to the Associated Press All-Southwest Conference team for 1978. He was also named the Southwest Conference Lineman of the Year that season.

Brown was not drafted out of college. He believed that was due to his height, at just about 6 feet. He was signed out of college by the Houston Oilers in 1979 but was cut after one preseason game. He was then signed by the Cardinals in November 1979 and added to their roster for a game against the Philadelphia Eagles. After playing in 4 of the Cardinals last 5 games in 1979, he was cut by the team during the 1980 preseason.

Brown's father Charlie Brown also played for the University of Houston Cougars and signed a contract with the Oakland Raiders.
