= Willie Belton =

American football player (1948–1992)

- Belton in 1972

No. 28, 33
- Position: Running back

Personal information
- Born: December 12, 1948; Greenville, South Carolina
- Died: December 5, 1992 (aged 43); Greenville, South Carolina
- Listed height: 5 ft 11 in (1.80 m)
- Listed weight: 207 lb (94 kg)

Career information
- College: Maryland Eastern Shore

Career history
- Atlanta Falcons (1971–1972); St. Louis Cardinals (1973–1974)

Career statistics
- Games played: 36
- Starts: 0
- Rushing yards: 306 (3.9 average)
- Receiving yards: 21 (5.3 average)
- Touchdowns: 2
- Stats at Pro Football Reference

Willie Davis "Jazz" Belton Jr. (December 12, 1948 – December 7, 1992) was an American football running back in the National Football League who played for the Atlanta Falcons and St. Louis Cardinals. He played college football for the Maryland Eastern Shore Hawks.

== Early life ==
Willie Belton Jr. was born in Greenville, South Carolina on December 12, 1948. He attended Washington High School in Greenville, where he was the team's starting quarterback for four years.

He attended Maryland Eastern Shore, where he was converted to running back and in 1968 became the first freshman in school history to lead his team in scoring. This ended his college career, however, as after the season he enlisted in the United States Marine Corps, in which he served until July 1971, based at Okinawa and Japan.

== Professional career ==
Home again in Greenville, the city in which the Falcons held their annual training camp, Belton was recommended for a tryout to head scout Tom Braatz by his mother's employer. Braatz remembered Belton's name and signed him to an NFL contract.

During his rookie 1971 season, Belton returned kickoffs, setting a club record with an average return of 25.2 yards, including two returns of over 50 yards and a 57 yard punt return nullified by penalty. Belton saw action in all 14 games for Atlanta both in 1971 and 1972.

Belton signed with the St. Louis Cardinals for the 1973 season, but only saw brief action in three games. Similarly in 1974 he only made it on the field on five occasions, carrying the ball 12 times for 49 yards.

== Life after football ==
After his time in the NFL was over, Belton's life spiraled downwards due to drug use and crime, for which he spent time in prison.

Belton died December 5, 1992, in Greenville. He was 43 years old at the time of his death and left a wife and two sons.
