= Terrence Anthony =

American football player (born 1965)

No. 22
- Position: Defensive back

Personal information
- Born: January 17, 1965 (age 61); East St. Louis, Illinois, U.S.
- Listed height: 5 ft 10 in (1.78 m)
- Listed weight: 183 lb (83 kg)

Career information
- College: Iowa State
- NFL draft: 1987: 9th round, 236th overall pick

Career history
- Atlanta Falcons (1987)*; St. Louis Cardinals (1987)
- * Offseason or practice squad member only

Awards and highlights
- Second-team All-Big Eight (1986)
- Stats at Pro Football Reference

Terrence Everett Anthony (born January 17, 1965) is an American former professional football player who was a defensive back as a replacement player with the St. Louis Cardinals of the National Football League (NFL) in 1987. He played college football for the Iowa State Cyclones.

== Professional career ==
=== Atlanta Falcons ===
Anthony was selected in the ninth round of the 1987 NFL draft by the Atlanta Falcons, with the 236th pick overall. The Falcons waived him on September 7, 1987, just one week before the team's first regular season game.

=== St. Louis Cardinals ===
During the 1987 NFL season, there was a players' strike that resulted in the Week 4, Week 5, and Week 6 games being played with replacement players. Anthony was one of such players for the St. Louis Cardinals, playing in the Week 5 game on October 11, which was a 24–19 home win against the New Orleans Saints.
