= Elmer Arterburn =

American football player (1929–2019)

No. 7
- Position: Defensive back

Personal information
- Born: June 15, 1929; Drumright, Oklahoma
- Died: May 31, 2019 (aged 89)
- Listed height: 5 ft 10 in (1.78 m)
- Listed weight: 175 lb (79 kg)

Career information
- High school: Ranger (Texas)
- College: Texas Tech

Career history
- Chicago Cardinals (1954)
- Stats at Pro Football Reference

Elmer Forrest Arterburn Jr. (June 15, 1929 - May 31, 2019) was an American football defensive back who played for the Chicago Cardinals. He played college football at Texas Tech University, having previously attended Ranger High School.
