= Les Bruckner =

American football player (1918–2014)

- Bruckner in 1944 with the Fort Pierce Amphibs football team

Profile
- Positions: Quarterback, tackle, fullback

Personal information
- Born: April 16, 1918; Milan, Michigan, U.S.
- Died: September 21, 2014 (age 96); Pasadena, California, U.S.
- Listed height: 6 ft 1 in (1.85 m)
- Listed weight: 195 lb (88 kg)

Career information
- High school: Milan (MI)
- College: Michigan State University

Career history
- Kenosha Cardinals (1941); Chicago Cardinals (1945); San Francisco Clippers (1946)
- Stats at Pro Football Reference

Leslie Charles Bruckner (April 16, 1918 – September 21, 2014) was an American football player and coach. He played college football as a quarterback and tackle for the Michigan State Spartans from 1937 to 1939. He served in the Navy during World War II and played at the fullback position for the undefeated 1944 Fort Pierce Amphibs football team. After the war, he played for the Chicago Cardinals of the National Football League. He later coached football and basketball, including stints at Pasadena City College and Burbank High School.

== Early life ==
Bruckner grew up in Milan, Michigan. He was an all-state football player at Milan High School.

== Michigan State ==
Bruckner attended Michigan State College (later known as Michigan State University) where he played in the backfield for the football team from 1937 to 1939. Bruckner played at the quarterback position for Michigan State in 1937 and 1938, earning a reputation as a skilled blocker. He helped lead the 1937 Michigan State Spartans football team to an 8–1 record in the regular season and a berth in the 1938 Orange Bowl. In 1939, he asked to be switched to the tackle position as "it will give me a chance to learn the things I don't know and better equip me for a coaching position.' Bruckner also did place-kicking for the Spartans, kicking nine extra points and a field goal as a junior. Michigan State coaches called him "the boy who tried to learn everything there is about football."

Bruckner also competed as a shot putter for the Michigan State track team. He was also runner up in the heavyweight class of the all-college boxing tournament.

== Teaching, military service, and pro football ==
After graduating from Michigan State, Bruckner worked during the summer as director of playgrounds in Milan. In August 1940, he was hired as a history teacher and the line coach at Jackson High School in Jackson, Michigan.

In the spring of 1941, Bruckner left Jackson, joined the Navy and was assigned as a physical instructor and football coach at the Great Lakes Naval Training Station in Chicago. He also played for the Great Lakes basketball team during the 1941-42 season. He also played at the fullback position for the Kenosha Cardinals professional football team during the fall of 1941.

With the United States entry into World War II, Bruckner was promoted to the rank of lieutenant. He played fullback for the 1944 Fort Pierce Amphibs football team that compiled a perfect 9–0 record and was ranked No. 18 in the final AP poll. Bruckner scored 58 points for the 1944 Amphibs. After the football season, he was transferred to Oceanside, California.

Bruckner was discharged from the Navy in September 1945, after 50 months of service. Shortly after his discharge from the Navy, Bruckner signed with the Chicago Cardinals of the National Football League. He appeared in two NFL games, recovered one fumble, and returned one kickoff for 13 yards.

Bruckner concluded his playing career in 1946 with the San Francisco Clippers. He had an interception that he returned for a touchdown against the Oakland Giants in November 1946.

== Later years and family ==
After his football career ended, Bruckner moved to southern California where he served as head basketball coach and assistant football coach at Pasadena City College from 1947 to 1949. In July 1949, he was hired as the head football and track coach at Burbank High School. He served as a history teacher and football coach at Burbank High. He later worked as a realtor and on weekends as an umpire for college and high school football games.

Bruckner was married to Joan Olds, and they had two sons, Doug and Scott. He died in 2014 in Pasadena, California.
