= Ted Bucklin =

American football player (1903–1945)

No. 9, 0
- Position: Fullback

Personal information
- Born: May 9, 1903; Idaho Falls, Idaho, U.S.
- Died: October 19, 1945 (aged 42); Idaho Falls, Idaho, U.S.
- Listed height: 6 ft 0 in (1.83 m)
- Listed weight: 199 lb (90 kg)

Career information
- High school: Logan (Logan, Utah)
- College: Idaho

Career history
- Chicago Cardinals (1927); New York Giants (1931)

Career statistics
- Rushing touchdowns: 1
- Stats at Pro Football Reference

Ted Bucklin (May 9, 1903 – October 19, 1945) was an American football fullback. He played for the Chicago Cardinals in 1927 and for the New York Giants in 1931. He played college football at Idaho.

== Death ==
Bucklin died as a result of an illness.
