= Bill Bredde =

American football player (1932–2006)

No. 40
- Positions: Defensive back, halfback

Personal information
- Born: December 31, 1932; Winterhaven, California, U.S.
- Died: September 16, 2006 (aged 73); Golden Valley, Arizona, U.S.
- Listed height: 6 ft 1 in (1.85 m)
- Listed weight: 195 lb (88 kg)

Career information
- High school: Pawnee (OK)
- College: Oklahoma State
- NFL draft: 1954: 4th round, 38th overall pick

Career history
- Chicago Cardinals (1954)

Career NFL statistics
- Rushing yards: 57
- Rushing average: 4.4
- Receptions: 3
- Receiving yards: 44
- Total touchdowns: 1
- Stats at Pro Football Reference

William M. Bredde Jr. (December 31, 1932 – September 16, 2006) was an American professional football defensive back and halfback. He was drafted by the Chicago Cardinals in the 4th round (38th overall) of the 1954 NFL Draft. He played for the Chicago Cardinals in 1954.
