= Tony Buford =

American football player born in 1964

No. 54
- Position: Linebacker

Personal information
- Born: April 21, 1964 (age 62); St. Louis, Missouri, U.S.
- Listed height: 6 ft 2 in (1.88 m)
- Listed weight: 222 lb (101 kg)

Career information
- High school: Lutheran North
- College: Tulsa
- NFL draft: 1987: undrafted

Career history
- St. Louis Cardinals (1987)
- Stats at Pro Football Reference

Anthony D. Buford (born April 21, 1964) is an American former professional football player who was a linebacker for the St. Louis Cardinals of National Football League (NFL). He played college football for the University of Tulsa.
