= Jeff Burkett =

American football player (1921–1947)

No. 35
- Positions: Wide receiver, punter

Personal information
- Born: July 15, 1921; Hattiesburg, Mississippi, U.S.
- Died: October 24, 1947 (aged 26); Bryce Canyon, Utah, U.S.
- Listed height: 6 ft 1 in (1.85 m)
- Listed weight: 190 lb (86 kg)

Career information
- High school: Laurel (MS)
- College: LSU

Career history
- Chicago Cardinals (1947)

Awards and highlights
- NFL champion (1947)

Career statistics
- Games played: 3
- Stats at Pro Football Reference

Jefferson Davis Burkett (July 15, 1921 – October 24, 1947) was an American professional football player. He was a part of the Chicago Cardinals NFL championship team in 1947. He died in a plane crash while returning to the team following surgery for appendicitis.

== Professional career ==
After playing at LSU, Burkett was signed by the Cardinals. He was not only a punter for the Cardinals, but was also one of the team's receivers as well. Though his career only consisted of three games before his untimely death, Burkett had caught two passes for 44 yards and a touchdown. In addition to playing end and punter, Burkett also played as a defensive back, intercepting a pass and returning it for 25 yards.

== Death ==
Burkett was suffering from appendicitis after a game against the Los Angeles Rams, who had beaten the Cardinals 27–7, handing Chicago their first loss of the season. Burkett opted to stay behind and have the surgery to remove his appendix. Once he was released from the hospital, Burkett boarded a United Airlines DC-6. The flight, United Air Lines Flight 608, crashed in Utah, killing all 52 people aboard. At the time of his death, Burkett was the league's leading punter. After Burkett's death, Cardinals quarterback Charley Trippi took over the punting duties. Trippi admitted taking over for Burkett was hard and he thought of his fallen teammate every time he punted in a game.

== See also ==
- List of gridiron football players who died during their careers
