= Gil Berry =

American football player (1921–2022)

- Berry as a collegian in 1931

No. 28
- Position: Halfback

Personal information
- Born: March 21, 1911; Lewistown, Illinois, U.S.
- Died: April 20, 1974 (aged 63); Indianapolis, Indiana, U.S.
- Listed height: 5 ft 10 in (1.78 m)
- Listed weight: 178 lb (81 kg)

Career information
- High school: Abingdon (IL)
- College: Illinois

Career history
- Chicago Cardinals (1935)

Career statistics
- Games played: 6
- Starts: 2
- Rushing yards: 77
- Rushing attempts: 44
- Touchdowns: 0
- Stats at Pro Football Reference

Gilbert Irwin Berry Sr. (March 21, 1911 – April 20, 1974) was an American football halfback who played collegiately for the University of Illinois in the early thirties and for the Chicago Cardinals of the National Football League (NFL) during the 1935 season. In later years he was the director of the Indianapolis Motor Speedway Radio Network, for which he was honored with an international broadcasting award by Sports Illustrated magazine.

== Biography ==
=== Early life ===
Gil Berry was born March 21, 1911, in Lewistown, Illinois. He attended Abingdon High School in Abingdon, Illinois.

=== College career ===
Berry enrolled in the University of Illinois in 1929, where he was a member of the Fighting Illini freshman football team that same year and the varsity squad from 1930 to 1932. As a freshman halfback, Berry made clear his bona fides to head coach Robert Zuppke by breaking a 65-yard touchdown run against the varsity in the team's annual freshman–varsity scrimmage — said to be the only touchdown run made against the older squad in several years.

Berry earned All-America consideration in 1931 and 1932, and was selected as captain of the team for 1932. He graduated from Illinois with a degree in journalism.

He was selected to play in the 1933 East–West Shrine game, held in San Francisco, as well as the 1933 East–West All-Star game, held at Soldier Field in Chicago.

=== Professional career ===
Berry as a member of the Chicago Cardinals in 1935.

After graduation, Berry relocated to Hollywood, California and briefly attempted to break into the motion picture industry. He returned to the Midwest in time to sign a contract with the Chicago Cardinals of the National Football League (NFL) for the 1935 season.

Berry's foray into the professional game was brief an relatively unsuccessful. He saw action in just 6 games, starting in two of these, and carried the ball a total of 44 times for 77 years — an average of just 1.8 yards per carry.

=== Life after football ===
After leaving the NFL, Berry began to make good on his journalism degree by taking a position with the Chicago Herald and Examiner as a classified advertising salesman. He remained in that capacity until 1940, when he moved to radio, working as an advertising salesman for stations WMAC and WENR through 1942. He became sales manager for WENR in 1942, where he remained through the years of the Second World War. He was tabbed as sales manager for the Chicago division of the American Broadcasting Company (ABC) in 1946.

In 1949, Berry moved from radio to television, managing the Chicago division of the Dumont Television Network until 1951. He then joined WIBC in Indianapolis as a vice president and general sales manager. There he established the Indianapolis Motor Speedway Radio Network, a project which he headed until his retirement in 1970. For his work with the Motor Speedway Network, Sports Illustrated magazine honored him with its International Broadcasting Award.

=== Death and legacy ===
Berry died April 20, 1974, in a nursing home in Indianapolis. He was 63 years old at the time of his death. He was survived by a wife and five children.
