= Ed Allen (American football) =

American football player (1901–1979)

No. 30
- Position: End

Personal information
- Born: June 5, 1901; Dixon, Illinois, U.S.
- Died: August 1979 (aged 78)
- Listed height: 5 ft 8 in (1.73 m)
- Listed weight: 175 lb (79 kg)

Career information
- High school: Dixon (IL)
- College: Creighton

Career history
- Chicago Cardinals (1928)

Career NFL statistics
- Games played: 2
- Games started: 2
- Stats at Pro Football Reference

Joseph Edmund Allen (June 5, 1901 – August 1979) was an American football end who played one season in the National Football League (NFL) for the Chicago Cardinals. He played college football for Creighton University.

Allen was born on June 5, 1901, in Dixon, Illinois. He attended Dixon High School there, graduating in c. 1922. He joined Creighton University in 1923, and spent three years with the college.

In 1928, Allen was signed to play professional football in the National Football League (NFL) by the Chicago Cardinals. He appeared in two total games, starting both at the end position. He wore number 30. Allen did not return to the team for their 1929 season.

Allen died in August 1979, at the age of 78.
