= Bunny Belden =

American football player (1900–1976)

No. 12, 25, 39
- Position: Back

Personal information
- Born: December 7, 1900; Chicago, Illinois, U.S.
- Died: November 1976; Skokie, Illinois, U.S.

Career information
- College: Saint Mary's College of California

Career history
- Duluth Eskimos (1927); Chicago Cardinals (1929–1931)

Charles William "Bunny" Belden (December 7, 1900 – November 1976) was an American football player. He played for the Duluth Eskimos and Chicago Cardinals. He played college football for Saint Mary's College of California.
