= Willis Brennan =

American football player (1893–1950)

Profile
- Positions: Tackle, guard

Personal information
- Born: February 12, 1893; Chicago, Illinois, U.S.
- Died: October 19, 1950 (aged 57); Chicago, Illinois, U.S.
- Listed height: 6 ft 0 in (1.83 m)
- Listed weight: 214 lb (97 kg)

Career history
- Chicago Cardinals (1920–1927)
- Stats at Pro Football Reference

William H. Brennan (February 12, 1893 – October 19, 1950) was an American football player who played eight seasons for the Chicago Cardinals. He played for independent teams from 1907 or 1908 until signing with the Cardinals in 1920, with which he would play until retiring following the 1927 season. He also was a noted police officer, and was still able to serve full-time even during his football career.
