= Arizona Cardinals all-time roster (Kir–Z) =

2,146 players have appeared in at least one regular season or postseason game in the National Football League (NFL) for the Arizona Cardinals franchise since 1920. This list includes those whose last names fall between "Kir" and "Z". For the rest, see Arizona Cardinals all-time roster (A–Kin). This list is accurate through the end of the 2025 NFL season.

== Kir-Ku ==
- Christian Kirk
- Randy Kirk
- Dre Kirkpatrick
- Tony Klimek
- John Klumb
- Gary Knafelc
- Bam Knight
- Charlie Knight
- George Knight
- Qwuantrezz Knight
- Shawn Knight
- Tom Knight
- Johnny Knolla
- Kevin Knox
- Mike Kochel
- Warren Koegel
- Bob Koehler
- Mike Koken
- Kevin Kolb
- Lou Kolls
- Ross Kolodziej
- Bill Koman
- Max Komar
- Bob Konovsky
- Ken Kortas
- Dan Kreider
- Joe Krejci
- Dave Krieg
- Rolf Krueger
- Joe Kuharich
- Craig Kupp
- Malcolm Kutner
- John Kuzman

== L ==
- Travis LaBoy
- Steve Lach
- Jim Ladd
- Greg LaFleur
- Dick Lage
- Mike LaHood
- Roddy Lamb
- Lowell Lander
- MacArthur Lane
- Night Train Lane
- Chick Lang
- Bill Lange
- Paul LaRosa
- Ted Larsen
- Louie Larson
- Ojay Larson
- Paul Larson
- Greg Lasker
- Kwamie Lassiter
- Jerry Latin
- Chuck Latourette
- Lindy Lauro
- Jimmy Lawrence
- Rashard Lawrence
- Mike Leach
- Wesley Leasy
- Nick Leckey
- Doc Ledbetter
- Jonathan Ledbetter
- Andy Lee
- Bobby Lee
- Charles Lee
- Jeff Lee
- John Lee
- Monte Lee
- Oudious Lee
- Dave Leggett
- Matt Leinart
- Paris Lenon
- John Leonard
- Jack LeVeck
- Nick Leverett
- Chuck Levy
- Bill Lewis
- Jonathan Lewis
- Mac Lewis
- Woodley Lewis
- Frank Liebel
- Joe Lillard
- Ryan Lindley
- Al Lindow
- Jim Lipinski
- Rusty Lisch
- Ed Listopad
- David Little
- Steve Little
- Chris Liwienski
- Dick Loepfe
- Steve Lofton
- Chuck Logan
- T. J. Logan
- Joe Lokanc
- Tony Lomack
- Neil Lomax
- Dave Long
- Lance Long
- Tom Longo
- Roy Lopez
- Thomas Lott
- Lamar Louis
- Duval Love
- Randy Love
- Mike Loyd
- Justin Lucas
- Jesse Luketa
- Ricky Lumpkin
- David Lunceford
- Jerry Lunz
- Deuce Lutui
- Lester Lyles
- Jeff Lyman
- Lorenzo Lynch
- Lynn Lynch
- Shawn Lynch

== M ==
- Mark MacDonald
- Mickey MacDonnell
- Cedric Mack
- Terence Mack
- David Macklin
- Lloyd Madden
- Bob Maddock
- Mark Maddox
- Tyreek Maddox-Williams
- Chet Maeda
- George Magulick
- Ike Mahoney
- Joel Makovicka
- Ray Mallouf
- Cameron Malveaux
- Mark Manges
- Dexter Manley
- Dave Mann
- Howard Maple
- Ted Marchibroda
- Ed Marcontell
- Ray Marelli
- Dale Markham
- Lou Marotti
- Rube Marquardt
- John Marrow
- Cassius Marsh
- Doug Marsh
- Richard Marshall
- Wilber Marshall
- Abe Martin
- Caleb Martin
- Gabe Martin
- Johnny Martin
- Kareem Martin
- Koda Martin
- Joel Mason
- Robert Massey
- Bobby Massie
- Walt Masters
- Tyrann Mathieu
- Evan Mathis
- Mark Mathis
- Ollie Matson
- Christian Matthew
- Reagan Maui'a
- Stan Mauldin
- Chris Maumalanga
- Josh Mauro
- Bill May
- Mark May
- Adrian Mayes
- Tony Mayes
- Don Maynard
- Benson Mayowa
- Stafford Mays
- Jason McAddley
- Derrick McAdoo
- Fred McAfee
- Adrian McBride
- Charlie McBride
- Oscar McBride
- Trey McBride
- Trumaine McBride
- Bryan McCann
- Keith McCants
- John McCarthy
- J. J. McCleskey
- Tony McCombs
- Phil McConkey
- Josh McCown
- Colt McCoy
- LeRon McCoy
- Tony McCoy
- Matt McCrane
- Andy McCullough
- Hugh McCullough
- Jim McCusker
- Emmanuel McDaniel
- Lloyd McDermott
- Ron McDole
- Brandon McDonald
- Clinton McDonald
- Devon McDonald
- Mike McDonald
- Tim McDonald
- Coley McDonough
- John McDowell
- Leeland McElroy
- Bill McElwain
- Bryant McFadden
- Jim McFarland
- Bob McGee
- Dell McGee
- Mike McGee
- Stacy McGee
- Eddie McGill
- Mike McGill
- Mike McGraw
- Lamar McHan
- Nick McInerney
- Hugh McInnis
- Jeff McIntyre
- Rick McIvor
- Dennis McKinley
- Ronald McKinnon
- Jim McMahon
- Ernie McMillan
- Frank McNally
- Sean McNanie
- Paul McNulty
- Frank McPhee
- Ed McQuarters
- Pat McQuistan
- Trace McSorley
- Johnny McWilliams
- Dave Meggyesy
- Peter Mehringer
- Dale Meinert
- Mike Melinkovich
- Max Melton
- Dale Memmelaar
- Rashard Mendenhall
- Mike Mergen
- Elmer Merkovsky
- Dave Merritt
- Bus Mertes
- Frank Mestnik
- Eric Metcalf
- Terry Metcalf
- Russ Method
- Mike Mikulak
- Joshua Miles
- Dub Miller
- Harlan Miller
- Jamir Miller
- Terry Miller
- Hanik Milligan
- Denver Mills
- Jordan Mills
- Kevin Miniefield
- Kevin Minter
- Lance Mitchell
- Roland Mitchell
- Stump Mitchell
- Tywan Mitchell
- Dontay Moch
- Hal Moe
- John Mohardt
- Les Molloy
- Ifeanyi Momah
- Rob Monaco
- Ron Monaco
- Regis Monahan
- Avery Monfort
- Bill Montgomery
- Sully Montgomery
- Jim Mooney
- Bucky Moore
- Chris Moore
- Langston Moore
- Ricky Moore
- Rob Moore
- Ronald Moore
- Rondale Moore
- Sio Moore
- Zach Moore
- Hap Moran
- Sean Morey
- Don Morgan
- Alfred Morris
- Mike Morris
- Wayne Morris
- Bob Morrow
- Harold Morrow
- J. J. Moses
- Eddie Moss
- Mike Moten
- Tim Moynihan
- Bill Muellner
- Tom Mullen
- Trayvon Mullen
- Vern Mullen
- Lee Mulleneaux
- Wayne Mulligan
- Tony Mumford
- Munger
- Daniel Munyer
- Bill Murphy
- Byron Murphy
- Jim Murphy
- Tom Murphy
- Sean Murphy-Bunting
- Justin Murray
- Kyler Murray
- Adrian Murrell
- Bill Murrell
- P. J. Mustipher

== N ==
- Ray Nagel
- Ross Nagel
- Gern Nagler
- Zack Nash
- John Navarre
- Clem Neacy
- Joe Nedney
- Jim Neill
- Steve Neils
- J. J. Nelson
- Lee Nelson
- Dick Nesbitt
- Bob Neuman
- Ernie Nevers
- Reggie Newhouse
- Al Nichelini
- Bilal Nichols
- Deatrick Nichols
- Hamilton Nichols
- Ben Niemann
- Troy Niklas
- Dave Nisbet
- John Nix
- Robert Nkemdiche
- Terry Nofsinger
- Niko Noga
- Pete Noga
- Dick Nolan
- Earl Nolan
- Walter Nolen
- Bob Norman
- Jerry Norton
- Jay Novacek
- Nick Novak
- Mike Nugent
- Freddie Joe Nunn
- Bob Nussbaumer

== O ==
- Charles Oakley
- Brad Oates
- Vic Obeck
- Cyril Obiozor
- Dave O'Brien
- Red O'Connor
- Ifeadi Odenigbo
- Rees Odhiambo
- Carter O'Donnell
- Pat O'Donnell
- Neil O'Donoghue
- Ray Ogden
- Rick Ogle
- Cedric Oglesby
- Ifeanyi Ohalete
- Rich Ohrnberger
- BJ Ojulari
- Alex Okafor
- Chike Okeafor
- Chukky Okobi
- Steve Okoniewski
- Julian Okwara
- Chris Oldham
- Dave Olerich
- Clancy Oliver
- Vince Oliver
- Carl Olson
- Johnny Olszewski
- Eldonta Osborne
- Richard Osborne
- Jim Otis
- Brad Ottis
- Don Owens
- Luke Owens
- Marv Owens

== P ==
- Calvin Pace
- Jeff Paine
- Vinston Painter
- Michael Palardy
- Anton Palepoi
- Carson Palmer
- Scott Palmer
- Tejhaun Palmer
- Don Panciera
- John Panelli
- Ken Panfil
- Hal Pangle
- Joe Pappio
- Owen Pappoe
- Paul Pardonner
- Bob Paremore
- Don Parish
- Buddy Parker
- Joe Parker
- Chet Parlavecchio
- Jalen Parmele
- Gary Parris
- Zach Pascal
- Ron Pasquale
- Ralph Pasquariello
- Tony Pasquesi
- Rupert Pate
- Jack Patera
- Ben Patrick
- Frank Patrick
- Craig Patterson
- Cliff Patton
- Solomon Patton
- Walt Patulski
- Don Paul
- Tito Paul
- Bert Pearson
- Todd Peat
- Domata Peko
- Ray Pelfrey
- Elijhaa Penny
- John Perko
- Benny Perrin
- Gerry Perry
- Victor Perry
- Ara Person
- Corey Peters
- Frosty Peters
- Volney Peters
- Ike Petersen
- Adrian Peterson
- Kevin Peterson
- Patrick Peterson
- Todd Peterson
- George Petrovich
- John Phillips
- Jordan Phillips
- Reggie Phillips
- Rod Phillips
- Dean Philpott
- Don Pierce
- Olsen Pierre
- Steve Pisarkiewicz
- Charlie Pittman
- Danny Pittman
- Michael Pittman
- Dick Plasman
- Scott Player
- Eddie Pleasant
- Jake Plummer
- Tony Plummer
- Art Plunkett
- Joseph Plunkett
- Bob Pollard
- Gordon Polofsky
- Fran Polsfoot
- Buster Poole
- Nate Poole
- Eli Popa
- Leonard Pope
- John Popovich
- Milt Popovich
- Joey Porter
- Earl Potteiger
- Nate Potter
- William Powell
- Jerraud Powers
- Matt Prater
- John Preston
- Billy Price
- Bobby Price
- Givens Price
- Mitchell Price
- Ricky Proehl
- Ted Provost
- Jim Psaltis
- Justin Pugh
- Craig Puki
- Andy Puplis
- Cal Purdin
- Earl Putman

== Q ==
- Ryan Quigley

== R ==
- Mike Rabold
- Neil Rackers
- Keith Radecic
- Bruce Radford
- Dan Ralph
- Jim Ramey
- Buster Ramsey
- Knox Ramsey
- Ray Ramsey
- Eason Ramson
- Sonny Randle
- Clare Randolph
- Walt Rankin
- Derrick Ransom
- Keith Ranspot
- Ahmad Rashad
- Tim Rattay
- Bob Ravensberg
- Ken Reaves
- Jamaica Rector
- Haason Reddick
- Cory Redding
- Anthony Redmon
- Tom Redmond
- Brooks Reed
- Rock Reed
- Bryan Reeves
- Walter Reeves
- Caraun Reid
- Lamont Reid
- Tip Reiman
- Alan Reuber
- Freeman Rexer
- Bill Reynolds
- Bob Reynolds
- John Reynolds
- M. C. Reynolds
- Floyd Rhea
- Coby Rhinehart
- Kerry Rhodes
- Dave Ribble
- Simeon Rice
- Perry Richards
- C.J. Richardson
- John Richardson
- Elston Ridgle
- Curtis Riley
- Ed Risk
- Ray Risvold
- Jamie Rivers
- John Roach
- Rollin Roach
- Joe Robb
- Jack Robbins
- Tootie Robbins
- Andre Roberts
- Hal Roberts
- Pete Robertson
- Bryan Robinson
- Darius Robinson
- Jack Robinson
- Jeroy Robinson
- Patrick Robinson
- Hal Robl
- Marshall Robnett
- Dominique Rodgers-Cromartie
- Glynn Rogers
- George Rogge
- Johnny Roland
- Antrel Rolle
- Butch Rolle
- Steve Romanik
- Bill Rooney
- Cobb Rooney
- Jim Root
- Gene Rose
- Rocky Rosema
- Josh Rosen
- Timm Rosenbach
- Jeremy Ross
- Oliver Ross
- Raleigh Roundtree
- Bob Rowe
- Frank Roy
- Mark Royals
- Robert Rozier
- Angel Rubio
- Eddie Rucinski
- Frostee Rucker
- Keith Rucker
- Council Rudolph
- Mike Ruether
- Swede Rundquist
- Marion Rushing
- Doug Russell
- Johnny Rutledge
- Bill Ryan
- Frank Rydzewski
- Chad Ryland

== S ==
- Andy Sabados
- Tony Sacca
- Lenny Sachs
- Rod Saddler
- Floyd Sagely
- DeMarco Sampson
- Terry Samuels
- Frank Sanders
- James Sanders
- Lonnie Sanders
- Myjai Sanders
- Dan Sandifer
- Leo Sanford
- Sekou Sanyika
- Patrick Sapp
- Phil Sarboe
- Broderick Sargent
- Paul Sarringhaus
- Mack Sauls
- Jalen Saunders
- Hurles Scales
- John Scanlon
- Carmen Scardine
- A. J. Schable
- Andy Schillinger
- Maury Schleicher
- George Schmidt
- Joe Schmiesing
- George Schmitt
- Herm Schneidman
- Bo Schobel
- O'Brien Schofield
- Jay Schroeder
- Eric Schubert
- Eberle Schultz
- Pete Schultz
- Vic Schwall
- Don Schwartz
- Elmer Schwartz
- Bud Schwenk
- Josh Scobey
- Carlos Scott
- Ed Scott
- Yusuf Scott
- Colin Scotts
- Tom Seabron
- Ricky Seals-Jones
- Corey Sears
- Jimmy Sears
- Champ Seibold
- Rob Selby
- Clarence Self
- Bernie Semes
- Lyle Sendlein
- Frank Seno
- Mike Sensibaugh
- Jeff Severson
- Craig Shaffer
- Simon Shanks
- Luis Sharpe
- Matt Shaughnessy
- Bob Shaw
- Dennis Shaw
- Jesse Shaw
- Ernest Shazor
- Willie Shelby
- Deck Shelley
- L. J. Shelton
- Paul Shenefelt
- Trent Sherfield
- Anthony Sherman
- A. Q. Shipley
- Marcel Shipp
- John Shirk
- Roy Shivers
- Fred Shook
- Mike Shumann
- Don Shy
- Vai Sikahema
- Mike Sikora
- Sam Silas
- Carl Silvestri
- Butch Simas
- Clyde Simmons
- Dave Simmons
- Isaiah Simmons
- Jack Simmons
- Cody Simon
- Tharold Simon
- Keith Simons
- Carl Simpson
- Kenneth Sims
- Steven Sims
- Emil Sitko
- Mike Siwek
- John Skelton
- Duke Slater
- Bonnie Sloan
- Dwight Sloan
- Kedon Slovis
- Jessie Small
- Alfonso Smith
- Andre Smith
- Antonio Smith
- Ben Smith
- Bill Smith
- Cedric Smith
- Charles Smith
- Dennis Smith
- Emmitt Smith
- Eric Smith
- Garrison Smith
- George Smith
- J. T. Smith
- Jackie Smith
- Jacquies Smith
- Lance Smith
- Lecitus Smith
- Leonard Smith
- Mark Smith
- Perry Smith
- Terrance Smith
- Terrelle Smith
- Tyreke Smith
- Vernice Smith
- Wayne Smith
- Wilfrid Smith
- Cal Snowden
- Adam Snyder
- Jake Soliday
- Vic So'oto
- Rick Sortun
- Tom Southard
- Bradley Sowell
- Stephen Spach
- Cliff Speegle
- Julian Spence
- Mo Spencer
- Kory Sperry
- Cameron Spikes
- Phil Spiller
- Jack Spinks
- Danny Spradlin
- Bill Springsteen
- Micheal Spurlock
- Brian St. Pierre
- Billy Stacy
- Jeff Staggs
- Larry Stallings
- Robert Stallings
- Chad Stanley
- Drew Stanton
- Jason Starkey
- Duane Starks
- Jason Staurovsky
- Joe Staysniak
- Larry Stegent
- Pete Steger
- Bill Stein
- Larry Steinbach
- Stud Stennett
- Alex Stepanovich
- LaRod Stephens-Howling
- Vaughn Stewart
- Dave Stief
- Terry Stieve
- Ben Stille
- Dante Stills
- Ed Stinson
- Dixie Stokes
- Ken Stone
- Michael Stone
- Don Stonesifer
- Cliff Stoudt
- Jerry Stovall
- Tyronne Stowe
- Charlie Strack
- Red Strader
- Jimmy Strausbaugh
- Chris Streveler
- Scott Stringer
- Mike Strofolino
- Kevin Strong
- Chansi Stuckey
- Mel Stuessy
- Leo Sugar
- Terrell Suggs
- Dave Suminski
- Pat Summerall
- George Sutch
- Bill Svoboda
- Geoff Swaim
- Eric Swann
- Eric Swanson
- Evar Swanson
- D. J. Swearinger
- Josh Sweat
- J. R. Sweezy
- Larry Swider
- Rashod Swinger
- Reggie Swinton
- Mike Swistowicz
- John Symank
- Walt Szot

== T ==
- Alameda Ta'amu
- Joe Tafoya
- Ronald Talley
- Barron Tanner
- Jay Tant
- Pasoni Tasini
- Robert Tate
- Chester Taylor
- Curtis Taylor
- Jamar Taylor
- Jay Taylor
- Jim Taylor
- Kerry Taylor
- Mike Taylor
- Stepfan Taylor
- Dadrion Taylor-Demerson
- Jimmy Tays
- Len Teeuws
- Ryan Terry
- Larry Tharpe
- Jim Thaxton
- Cameron Thomas
- Earl Thomas
- Jim Thomas
- Jordan Thomas
- Josh Thomas
- Logan Thomas
- Ralph Thomas
- Starling Thomas V
- Xavier Thomas
- Anthony Thompson
- Deionte Thompson
- Harry Thompson
- Jalen Thompson
- Ken Thompson
- Norm Thompson
- Raynoch Thompson
- Ricky Thompson
- Bill Thornton
- Bruce Thornton
- Jim Thorpe
- Bob Thurbon
- Dennis Thurman
- Pat Tilley
- Pat Tillman
- Ken Times
- Channing Tindall
- Gaynell Tinsley
- Jess Tinsley
- Howie Tipton
- Pago Togafau
- Jim Tolbert
- Greg Toler
- Jalen Tolliver
- Dalvin Tomlinson
- Mario Tonelli
- Cole Toner
- Khyiris Tonga
- Charlie Toogood
- Bud Toscani
- Mao Tosi
- Bobby Towns
- Lester Towns
- Curtis Townsend
- John Tracey
- Badara Traore
- Ross Travis
- Mark Traynowicz
- Bill Triplett
- Wally Triplett
- Charley Trippi
- Frank Tripucka
- R-Kal Truluck
- Jerry Tubbs
- Mark Tucker
- Max Tuerk
- Jerame Tuman
- Clayton Tune
- Tom Tupa
- Herschel Turner
- Marcus Turner
- Ezekiel Turner
- Pete Tyler

== U ==
- Mitchell Ucovich
- Chuck Ulrich
- Jack Underwood
- Marvin Upshaw
- Jerheme Urban
- Darryl Usher

== V ==
- Vincent Valentine
- Tanner Vallejo
- Hakeem Valles
- Kyle Vanden Bosch
- Tim Van Galder
- Fred Vanzo
- Charles Vatterott
- Pug Vaughan
- Jared Veldheer
- John Vesser
- Nick Vigil
- Danny Villa
- Keydrick Vincent
- Tristan Vizcaino
- Joe Vodicka
- Walter Voigt
- Otto Vokaty
- Travis Vokolek
- Bill Volok
- Jeremy Vujnovich

== W ==
- Andre Wadsworth
- Clint Wager
- Jim Wagstaff
- Jim Wahler
- Fred Wakefield
- Mark Walczak
- Tim Waldron
- Chuck Walker
- Darwin Walker
- Joe Walker
- Quentin Walker
- Reggie Walker (born 1986)
- Reggie Walker (born 1996)
- K'Von Wallace
- Brett Wallerstedt
- Fred Wallner
- Raymond Walls
- Troy Walters
- Zack Walz
- Jonathan Ward
- Derek Ware
- Matt Ware
- Kurt Warner
- Charles Washington
- Chris Washington
- Daryl Washington
- Eric Washington
- Lionel Washington
- Andre Waters
- Earl Watford
- Jerry Watford
- Bobby Watkins
- Carlos Watkins
- Gabe Watson
- J. J. Watt
- Walter Watt
- Sean Weatherspoon
- Buck Weaver
- Xavier Weaver
- Chuck Weber
- Dick Wedel
- Scott Wedige
- Roger Wehrli
- Bub Weller
- Beanie Wells
- David Wells
- Reggie Wells
- Tom Welter
- Ken Wendt
- Antoine Wesley
- Jeff West
- Stan West
- Willie West
- Greg Westbrooks
- Jamaal Westerman
- John Wetzel
- Bill Whalen
- Tom Wham
- Ernie Wheeler
- Ted Wheeler
- Bill Whitaker
- Art White
- Corey White
- Kyzir White
- Paul White
- Ray White
- Tahir Whitehead
- Blake Whiteheart
- Teag Whiting
- S. J. Whitman
- Jace Whittaker
- Bob Wicks
- Chet Widerquist
- James Wiggins
- Matt Wile
- Elijah Wilkinson
- Ken Willard
- Aeneas Williams
- Bobby Williams
- Brandon Williams
- Chad Williams
- Chris Williams
- Clarence Williams
- Clyde Williams
- Damien Williams
- Dan Williams
- Darrel Williams
- Dave Williams
- Eric Williams
- Garrett Williams
- Gerard Williams
- Herb Williams
- Jake Williams
- James Williams
- Jamie Williams
- Jonah Williams
- Karl Williams
- Kerwynn Williams
- Kevin Williams
- Maxx Williams
- Rex Williams
- Ryan Williams
- Stephen Williams
- Teddy Williams
- Tramon Williams
- Trevor Williams
- Ty'Son Williams
- Willie Williams
- Xavier Williams
- Larry Willingham
- Adrian Wilson
- Bernard Wilson
- Billy Wilson
- Divaad Wilson
- Gordon Wilson
- Karl Wilson
- Larry Wilson
- Mack Wilson
- Marco Wilson
- Michael Wilson
- Mike Wilson
- Ramik Wilson
- Javon Wims
- Ryan Winslow
- Eric Winston
- Brian Winters
- Cal Withrow
- Joe Wolf
- Ron Wolfley
- Bobby Wood
- Mike Wood
- Tom Woodeshick
- LaMarr Woodley
- Jim Woodruff
- Antwaun Woods
- Josh Woods
- LeVar Woods
- Abe Woodson
- Rolly Woolsey
- Barry Word
- Keith Wortman
- Tony Wragge
- Charles Wright
- Jason Wright
- Nate Wright
- Scooby Wright
- Steve Wright
- Willie Wright
- Al Wukits
- Sam Wyche

== Y ==
- Vinnie Yablonski
- Ron Yankowski
- Tommy Yarr
- Don Yeisley
- Bob Young
- Lonnie Young
- Michael Young

== Z ==
- Mike Zandofsky
- Dave Zastudil
- Frank Zelencik
- Peppi Zellner
- Zach Zenner
- Bob Zimny
- Clyde Zoia
- Lou Zontini
- John Zook
- Mike Zordich
