= 1943 Chicago Cardinals season =

American football team season

- Owner: Charles W. Bidwill Sr.
- General manager: Arch Wolfe (Business Manager)
- Head coach: Phil Handler
- Home stadium: Comiskey Park

Results
- Record: 0–10
- Division place: 4th NFL Western
- Playoffs: Did not qualify

The 1943 Chicago Cardinals season was the 24th season the team was in the league. The team failed to improve on their previous output of 3–8, losing all ten games. They failed to qualify for the playoffs for the 18th consecutive season.

== Schedule ==
Week	Date	Opponent	Result	Record	Venue
1	September 19	at Detroit Lions	L 17–35	0–1	Briggs Stadium
2	Bye				
3	October 3	Green Bay Packers	L 7–28	0–2	Comiskey Park
4	October 10	at Chicago Bears	L 0–20	0–3	Wrigley Field
5	October 17	Detroit Lions	L 0–7	0–4	Civic Stadium
6	October 24	at Washington Redskins	L 7–13	0–5	Griffith Stadium
7	October 31	at Steagles	L 13–34	0–6	Forbes Field
8	November 7	at Brooklyn Dodgers	L 0–7	0–7	Ebbets Field
9	November 14	at Green Bay Packers	L 14–35	0–8	Wisconsin State Fair Park
10	November 21	at New York Giants	L 13–24	0–9	Polo Grounds
11	November 28	Chicago Bears	L 24–35	0–10	Comiskey Park
12	Bye				
13	Bye				

== Roster ==
1943 Chicago Cardinals final roster
Backs: 36 Joe Bukant FB/LB; 32 Ronnie Cahill RB/CB; 42 Marshall Goldberg RB/CB; 66 John Grigas RB/CB; 7 Johnny Hall RB/CB; 29 Johnny Martin RB/CB/P; 35 Walt Masters RB/CB; 48 Bob Morrow FB/LB; 15 Buddy Parker RB/S; 88 Andy Puplis RB/CB; 28 Walt Rankin RB/S; 26 George Smith FB/LB	Linemen/Linebackers: 75 Art Albrecht T/DT; 22 Conway Baker G/DG/K; 45 Clarence Booth T/DT; 70 Chet Bulger T/DT; 60 Gil Duggan T/DT; 41 Vern Ghersanich G/DG; 46 Lou Marotti G/DG; 64 Floyd Rhea G/DG; 21 Marshall Robnett G/DG; 37 Vaughn Stewart C/LB; 62 Dixie Stokes C/LB/K; 31 Gordon Wilson G/DG	Ends/Receivers: 18 Don Currivan; 63 Freeman Rexer; 51 Eddie Rucinski; 69 Clint Wager; Reserve: 11 Cal Purdin RB/CB/P (Military); rookies in italics

== Standings ==
NFL Western Division
	W	L	T	PCT	DIV	PF	PA	STK
Chicago Bears	8	1	1	.889	5–0–1	303	157	W1
Green Bay Packers	7	2	1	.778	4–1–1	264	172	W3
Detroit Lions	3	6	1	.333	2–4	178	218	L2
Chicago Cardinals	0	10	0	.000	0–6	95	238	L10

Note: Tie games were not officially counted in the standings until 1972.
