= List of Arizona Cardinals head coaches =

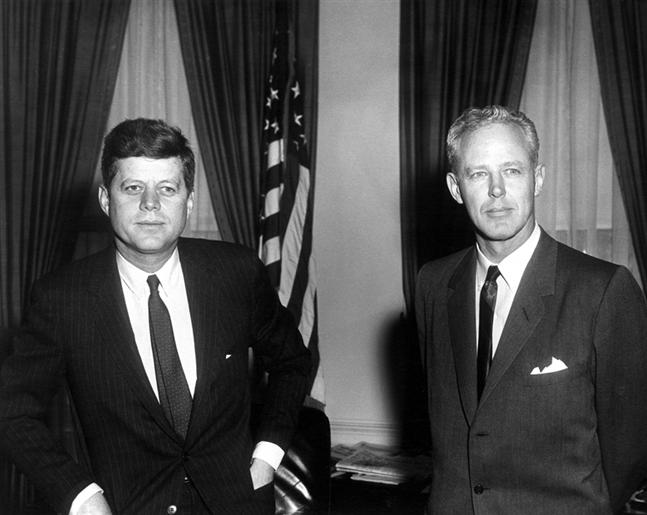
Bud Wilkinson (right) with United States President John F. Kennedy, during a 1961 visit to the White House. Wilkinson was the 26th head coach of the Cardinals from 1978 to 1979.

The Arizona Cardinals are a professional American football team based in Glendale, Arizona. The Cardinals compete in the National Football League (NFL) as a member of the league's National Football Conference (NFC) West division. The team began as the Morgan Athletic Club in 1898 in Chicago, Illinois. The team's second name was the Racine Normals, since it played at Normal Field on Racine Street. In 1901, they were renamed to the Racine Street Cardinals, a name that came from the University of Chicago jerseys that the team used, which were described as "Cardinal red". The team was established in Chicago in 1898 and was a charter member of the NFL in 1920. The team has played their home games at the State Farm Stadium since 2006 and is the oldest franchise in the NFL.

The team has moved to numerous cities during its history. After staying in Chicago from 1920 to 1959, it moved to St. Louis, Missouri and remained there from 1960 to 1987. It played in Tempe, Arizona, from 1988 to 2005, before eventually settling in Glendale, Arizona in 2006, where it now resides. Since 1920, two Cardinals coaches have won the NFL Championship: Norman Barry in 1925 and Jimmy Conzelman in 1947. In the Super Bowl era, the Cardinals won the NFC Championship and advanced to the Super Bowl once, in 2009 under coach Ken Whisenhunt. Five other coaches—Don Coryell, Jim Hanifan, Vince Tobin, Bruce Arians, and Kliff Kingsbury—have led the Cardinals to the playoffs.

There have been 43 head coaches for the Cardinals franchise since it became a professional team in 1920; fourteen of the team's coaches are former Cardinals players. Ernie Nevers and Jimmy Conzelman are the only coaches to have had more than one tenure with the team. Pop Ivy and Gene Stallings both coached the team during its move from one city to another. Cardinals coach Roy Andrews is tied for the lowest winning percentage among the team's coaches (.000), having lost the only game he coached in the 1931 season. Co-coach Walt Kiesling lost all ten games he coached in 1943, when the team merged with the Steelers during World War II and was known as Card-Pitt. Co-coaches Ray Willsey, Ray Prochaska, and Chuck Drulis have the highest winning percentage among Cardinals coaches (1.000). The team's all-time leader in games coached is Ken Whisenhunt, who was hired on January 14, 2007, with 96. Whisenhunt was fired on December 31, 2012, after the Cardinals recorded a 5–11 record in 2012. The all-time leader in wins is Bruce Arians with fifty, including one playoff victory.

== Key ==
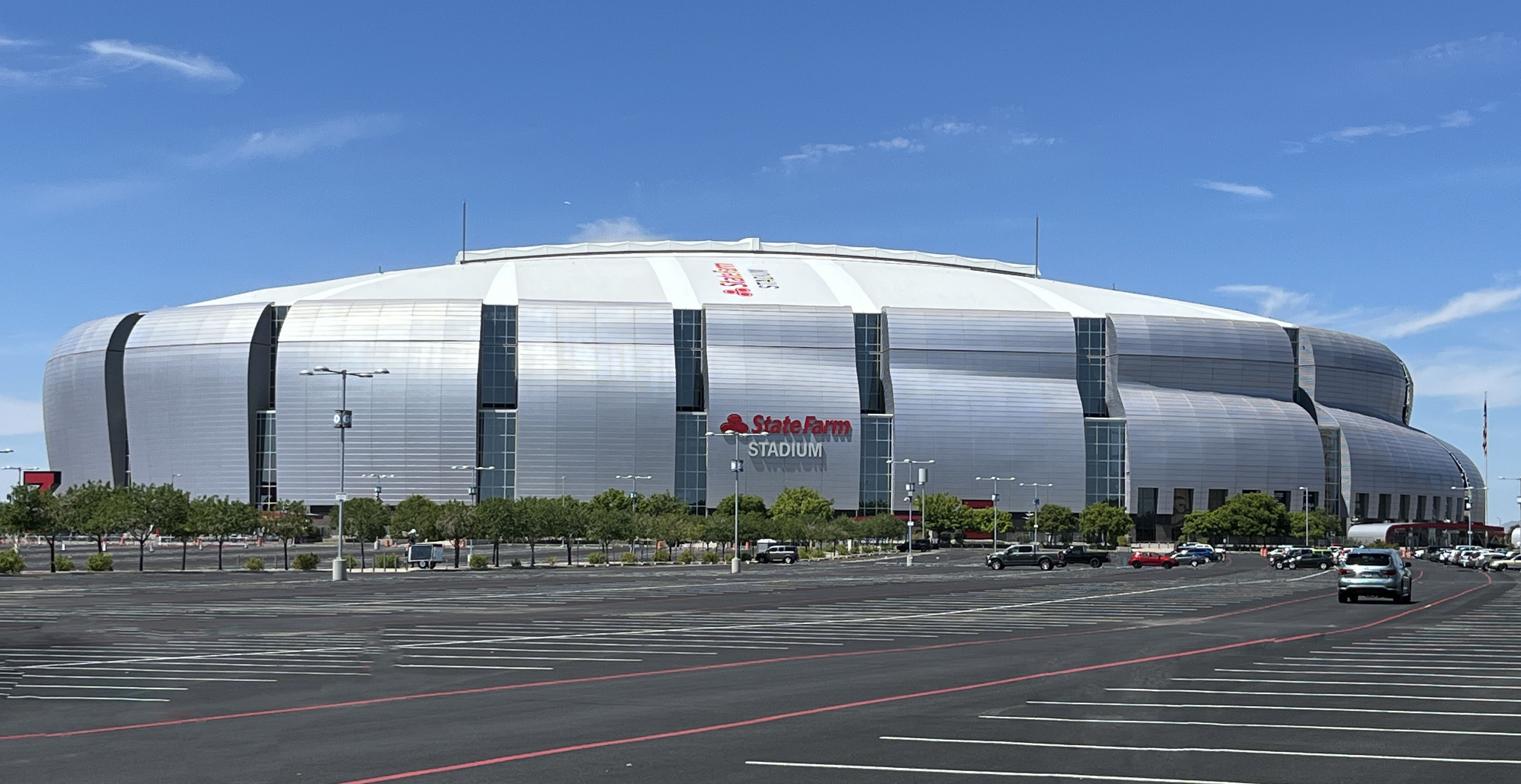
The Cardinals have played their home games at the State Farm Stadium since 2006.

#	Number of coaches (Note: A running total of the number of Cardinals head coaches. Thus, any head coach who has two or more terms is only counted once.)
GC	Games coached
W	Wins
L	Losses
T	Ties
Win%	Winning percentage
†	Elected into the Pro Football Hall of Fame as a coach
‡	Elected into the Pro Football Hall of Fame as a player
*	Spent entire NFL head coaching career with the Cardinals
^	1961 Season had 3 co-coaches for 2 games

== Coaches ==
Note: The list begins in 1920, when the Cardinals became a professional team. Statistics are accurate through Week 1 of the 2026 NFL season.

#	Image	Name	Term (Note: Each year is linked to an article about that particular NFL season.)	Regular season					Playoffs				Awards	Ref.
#	Image	Name	Term	GC	W	L	T	Win%	GC	W	L	Win%	Awards	Ref.
Chicago Cardinals
1		Paddy Driscoll ‡	1920–1922	29	17	8	4	.680	—					
2		Arnold Horween*	1923–1924	22	13	8	1	.619	—					
3		Norman Barry*	1925–1926	26	16	8	2	.667	—					
4		Guy Chamberlin †	1927	11	3	7	1	.300	—					
5		Fred Gillies*	1928	6	1	5	0	.167	—					
6		Dewey Scanlon	1929	13	6	6	1	.500	—					
7		Ernie Nevers ‡	1930–1931	21	10	9	2	.526	—					
8		Roy Andrews	1931	1	0	1	0	.000	—					
9		Jack Chevigny*	1932	10	2	6	2	.250	—					
10		Paul Schissler	1933–1934	22	6	15	1	.286	—					
11		Milan Creighton*	1935–1938	46	16	26	4	.381	—					
–		Ernie Nevers ‡	1939	11	1	10	0	.091	—					
12		Jimmy Conzelman †	1940–1942	33	8	22	3	.267	—					
13		Phil Handler*	1943	10	0	10	0	.000	—					
Card-Pitt
–		Phil Handler*	co-coaches 1944	10	0	10	0	.000	—					
14		Walt Kiesling‡	co-coaches 1944	10	0	10	0	.000	—					
Chicago Cardinals
–		Phil Handler*	1945	10	1	9	0	.100	—					
–		Jimmy Conzelman†	1946–1948	35	26	9	0	.743	2	1	1	.500	1947 Sporting News NFL Coach of the Year	
15		Buddy Parker	1949	12	6	5	1	.545	—					
16		Curly Lambeau †	1950–1951	22	7	15	0	.318	—					
17		Cecil Isbell	1951	2	1	1	0	.500	—					
18		Joe Kuharich	1952	12	4	8	0	.333	—					
19		Joe Stydahar	1953–1954	24	3	20	1	.130	—					
20		Ray Richards*	1955–1957	36	14	21	1	.400	—					
Chicago Cardinals and St. Louis Cardinals
21		Pop Ivy	1958–1961	48	15	31	2	.326	—					
St. Louis Cardinals
22		Ray Willsey* ^	3 co-coaches 1961 ^	2	2	0	0	1.000	–					
23		Ray Prochaska* ^	3 co-coaches 1961 ^	2	2	0	0	1.000	–					
24		Chuck Drulis* ^	3 co-coaches 1961 ^	2	2	0	0	1.000	–					
25		Wally Lemm	1962–1965	56	27	26	3	.509	—					
26		Charley Winner	1966–1970	70	35	30	5	.538	—					
27		Bob Hollway*	1971–1972	28	8	18	2	.308	—					
28		Don Coryell †	1973–1977	70	42	27	1	.609	2	0	2	.000	1974 Associated Press Coach of the Year; 1974 Pro Football Weekly Coach of the Year	
29		Bud Wilkinson*	1978–1979	29	9	20	0	.310	—					
30		Larry Wilson* ‡	1979	3	2	1	0	.667	—					
31		Jim Hanifan	1980–1985	89	39	49	1	.443	1	0	1	.000		
St. Louis Cardinals and Phoenix Cardinals
32		Gene Stallings*	1986–1989	58	23	34	1	.404	—					
Phoenix Cardinals
33		Hank Kuhlmann*	1989	5	0	5	0	.000	—					
34		Joe Bugel	1990–1993	64	20	44	0	.313	—					
Arizona Cardinals
35		Buddy Ryan	1994–1995	32	12	20	0	.375	—					
36		Vince Tobin*	1996–2000	71	28	43	0	.394	2	1	1	.500		
37		Dave McGinnis*	2000–2003	57	17	40	0	.298	—					
38		Dennis Green	2004–2006	48	16	32	0	.333	—					
39		Ken Whisenhunt	2007–2012	96	45	51	0	.469	6	4	2	.667		
40		Bruce Arians	2013–2017	80	49	30	1	.619	3	1	2	.333		
41		Steve Wilks	2018	16	3	13	0	.188	—					
42		Kliff Kingsbury*	2019–2022	66	28	37	1	.432	1	0	1	.000		
43		Jonathan Gannon*	2023–2025	51	15	36	0	.294	—					
44		Mike LaFleur*	2026–present	4	1	3	0	.250	—					
