= Arch Wolfe =

American football executive (1890–1971)

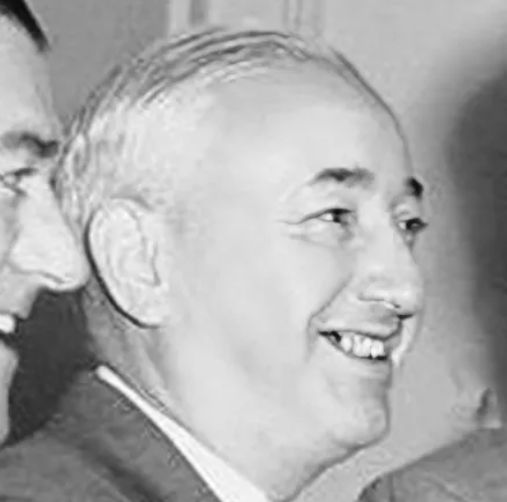
- Wolfe in 1950

Personal information
- Born: September 12, 1890; Kansas City, Kansas, U.S.
- Died: April 25, 1971 (aged 80)

Career history
- Chicago Cardinals (1933–1943); Card-Pitt (1944); Chicago / St. Louis Cardinals (1945–1971)

Awards and highlights
- NFL champion (1947)
- Executive profile at Pro Football Reference

Arch Wolfe (September 12, 1890 – April 25, 1971) was an American professional football executive, best known for his association with the Chicago / St. Louis Cardinals of the National Football League (NFL) from 1933 until his death in 1971. He was the general manager of the team from 1936 to 1946.

== Early life ==
Wolfe was born on September 12, 1890, in Kansas City, Kansas, later moving to Kansas City, Missouri. His father died when he was nine years old and two years later he moved with his 13 siblings to Chicago, Illinois. He worked with a rug-cleaning business owned by future Chicago Cardinals executive Charles Bidwill.

== Executive career ==
When Bidwill bought the Chicago Cardinals franchise in the National Football League (NFL) in 1933, Wolfe was given a position on the team. Early on, his duties included recording finances, serving as a traveling secretary, and, according to the St. Louis Post-Dispatch, acting as a "fight referee" – "Once he hopped the rail and sped out onto the field to separate a fuming Cardinal from an official whose calls had proved highly irritating. Wolfe figured it was better to risk his hide jumping into the way of what could be flying fists rather than lose a ball player in a key game." He served in the position of business manager and, starting in 1936, acted as their general manager.

In his first season as general manager, the Cardinals compiled a record of 3–8–1. He ultimately served in that role for 11 seasons; he oversaw the team as they merged with the Pittsburgh Steelers to create Card-Pitt in 1944 and helped them to a winning season with a 6–5 record in 1946, his last season in the position and only year with a winning record. Overall, the Cardinals compiled a record of 26–88–5 with Wolfe as general manager. One year after he was removed from his general manager position, the Cardinals won the 1947 NFL Championship Game over the Philadelphia Eagles, their first title since 1925, and, as of 2023, their last. Wolfe remained with the Cardinals for many years as their business manager, still working 9-to-5 hours at old age to handle his roles of collecting team profits and arranging team travel; he noted that "with the size of the checks today, I need a bodyguard. ...In the old days I could have put the game receipts in my pocket and people would have thought I was carrying around change." He was known for his knowledge of the team's history and was "frequently called upon to come up with some trivia long forgotten."

Outside of the NFL, Wolfe served as an executive in several other sports with teams owned by Bidwill, including with the Chicago Bruins basketball team, a Negro league baseball team, and at horse and dog racing tracks. He also was the president of the National Girls Baseball League from 1944 and added the position of commissioner from 1949 until his resignation in 1952.

== Personal life and death ==
Wolfe was married to Lee Wolfe; she predeceased him in 1964. He died on April 25, 1971, at the age of 80.
