= Johnny Martin (American football) =

American football player (1916–1968)

No. 29, 33
- Positions: Wingback, halfback

Personal information
- Born: January 8, 1918; Nashville, Arkansas, U.S.
- Died: March 17, 1968 (aged 50)
- Listed height: 6 ft 1 in (1.85 m)
- Listed weight: 195 lb (88 kg)

Career information
- College: Oklahoma
- NFL draft: 1941: 14th round, 128th overall pick

Career history
- Chicago Cardinals (1941–1943); Card-Pitt (1944); Boston Yanks (1944–1945)

Awards and highlights
- First-team All-Big Six (1940)

Career NFL statistics
- Rushing yards: 348
- Rushing average: 2.4
- Receptions: 41
- Receiving yards: 579
- Total touchdowns: 4
- Stats at Pro Football Reference

John Jay Martin (August 9, 1916 – March 17, 1968) was an American professional football player who played in the National Football League (NFL) from 1941 to 1945. Martin played for the Chicago Cardinals, Boston Yanks and "Card-Pitt", a team that was the result of a temporary merger between the Chicago Cardinals and the Pittsburgh Steelers. The teams' merger was a result of the manning shortages experienced league-wide due to World War II. He was released from "Card-Pitt" after the team's game against the Green Bay Packers, when it was discovered that John McCarthy could average 35 yards per punt. He then signed with the Boston Yanks.
