= John McCarthy (American football) =

American football player (1916–1998)

No. 24
- Position: Quarterback

Personal information
- Born: August 9, 1916; Philadelphia, Pennsylvania, U.S.
- Died: May 12, 1998 (aged 81); Haddon Township, New Jersey, U.S.
- Listed height: 5 ft 9 in (1.75 m)
- Listed weight: 160 lb (73 kg)

Career information
- High school: Camden Catholic
- College: Saint Francis

Career history
- Card-Pitt (1944)

Career NFL statistics
- Passing attempts: 67
- Passing completions: 20
- Completion percentage: 29.9%
- Passing yards: 250
- Passing touchdowns: 0
- Interceptions thrown: 13
- Passer rating: 3
- Stats at Pro Football Reference

John Patrick McCarthy (August 9, 1916 – May 12, 1998) was an American professional football player in the National Football League (NFL).

== Early life and college ==
McCarthy graduated from Camden Catholic High School in 1935 and Saint Francis University in 1942, where he was named to the first-team of the Little College All-American Football Team for 1941.

== Professional career ==
McCarthy played in the National Football League for just one season in 1944. McCarthy played for "Card-Pitt", a team that was the result of a temporary merger between the Chicago Cardinals and the Pittsburgh Steelers. The teams' merger was a result of the manning shortages experienced league-wide due to World War II.

McCarthy was brought in as the team's quarterback after starter Coley McDonough was drafted into the United States Army just six days prior to the team's second game. During a game against the Green Bay Packers, McCarthy's 35 yard-per-punt average emboldened Card-Pitt to release Johnny Martin.

At the end of the season, the Card-Pitt passers completed just 31% of their attempts, with eight touchdowns and 41 interceptions (a record at the time, and still the third highest total in NFL history). McCarthy threw 13 of those interceptions, and did not throw any touchdown passes. His quarterback rating was 3.0.

He also was the punter for the Card-Pitt team averaging 33.4 yards for 24 punts.

== Post-NFL career ==
McCarthy served in the Army Air Corp at the end of World War II.

He was a pitcher for a Canadian-American League farm team of the Philadelphia Phillies of Major League Baseball. He was a batting practice pitcher for the Phillies.

He became teacher of business and accounting and a basketball coach. Over the next 25 years at Camden Catholic High School, Gloucester Catholic High School, Gloucester High School, and Haddon Township High School in New Jersey his teams won more than 370 wins. His teams had 13 seasons with more than 20 wins and only one losing season. He was twice named South Jersey Coach of the Year. He was nicked named "The Silver Fox" because he was a wise strategist and he grayed prematurely in his 30s.

He was an assistant men's basketball coach at Temple University, Philadelphia, Pennsylvania under head coach Don Casey. during the 1973–1974; 1974–1975 and 1975–1976 seasons.

In his late 40s, he took up marathon running. He competed in an ultra marathon race of 67 1/4 miles in Cooper River Park at age 62. He completed his last competitive race was at age 72. He suffered from Parkinson's disease and died at his home in the Westmont section of Haddon Township, New Jersey at age 81. He is buried in Calvary Cemetery, Cherry Hill, New Jersey.
