= Clarence Booth =

American football player (1919–1974)

No. 45, 43
- Position: Tackle

Personal information
- Born: September 4, 1919; Childress, Texas, U.S.
- Died: April 23, 1974 (aged 54); Junction, Texas, U.S.
- Listed height: 6 ft 0 in (1.83 m)
- Listed weight: 223 lb (101 kg)

Career information
- College: SMU (1939-1942)
- NFL draft: 1943: 18th round, 164th overall pick

Career history
- Chicago Cardinals (1943); Card-Pitt (1944)

Career NFL statistics
- Games played: 11
- Stats at Pro Football Reference

Clarence E. Booth (September 4, 1919 – April 23, 1974) was a former professional American football offensive tackle in the National Football League (NFL). He was drafted in the 18th round (164th overall) of the 1943 NFL draft after playing college football at Southern Methodist University.

Booth played in the league for two seasons with the Chicago Cardinals and "Card-Pitt," a team that was the result of a temporary merger between the Chicago Cardinals and the Pittsburgh Steelers, in 1943 and 1944. The reason for the team merger was a league-wide shortage of manning due to World War II.
