= Don Currivan =

American football player (1920–1956)

No. 18, 63, 29, 1, 40, 34
- Position: End

Personal information
- Born: March 6, 1920; Mansfield, Massachusetts, U.S.
- Died: May 16, 1956 (aged 36); Osterville, Massachusetts, U.S.
- Listed height: 6 ft 0 in (1.83 m)
- Listed weight: 193 lb (88 kg)

Career information
- High school: Mansfield
- College: Boston College (1939–1942)
- NFL draft: 1943: 3rd round, 18th overall pick

Career history
- Chicago Cardinals (1943); Card-Pitt (1944); Boston Yanks (1945–1948); Los Angeles Rams (1948–1949)

Awards and highlights
- First-team All-American (1942); First-team All-Eastern (1942); NFL records: Most yards per reception in a season: 32.6 (1947) (Note: Minimum 1.875 receptions per team game)

Career NFL statistics
- Receptions: 78
- Receiving yards: 1,979
- Receiving touchdowns: 24
- Stats at Pro Football Reference

Donald F. Currivan (March 6, 1920 – May 16, 1956) was an American professional football end. He was born and raised in Mansfield, Massachusetts and graduated from Mansfield High School in 1938. He then attended and graduated from Boston College in 1942.

He played seven seasons in the National Football League (NFL) for the Chicago Cardinals (1943), the Boston Yanks (1945–1948), and the Los Angeles Rams (1948–1949). Currivan also played for "Card-Pitt" in 1944, a team that was the result of a temporary merger between the Cardinals and the Pittsburgh Steelers. The teams' merger was result of the manning shortages experienced league-wide due to World War II. In 1947, he caught 24 passes for 782 yards, averaging 32.6 yards per catch which remains the all-time record as of 2023 (min. 1.875 receptions per team game).

Currivan married Catherine (Rockett) Currivan in 1946. He had two children, John Joseph in 1948 and Nancy Anne, in 1953. He died suddenly on May 16, 1956, of a cerebral hemorrhage while playing golf at Oyster Harbors Golf Club in Osterville, Massachusetts at age 36.

He was inducted into the Boston College Varsity Club Athletic Hall of Fame 14 years after his death in 1970.
