= Vaughn Stewart =

Vaughn Stewart may refer to:

- Vaughn Stewart (American football)
- Vaughn Stewart (politician)
