= Chet Bulger =

American football player and coach (1917–2009)

No. 70, 79, 73, 45, 67, 11, 71
- Position: Tackle

Personal information
- Born: September 18, 1917; Rumford, Maine, U.S.
- Died: February 18, 2009 (aged 91); Fairfax, Virginia, U.S.
- Listed height: 6 ft 3 in (1.91 m)
- Listed weight: 260 lb (118 kg)

Career information
- High school: Stephens (Rumford)
- College: Auburn (1937–1940)
- NFL draft: 1941: undrafted

Career history

Playing
- Chicago Cardinals (1942–1943); Card-Pitt (1944); Chicago Cardinals (1945–1949); Detroit Lions (1950)

Coaching
- De La Salle Institute (IL) (1951–1954) Line coach; Saint Mary's (MN) (1954) Head coach

Awards and highlights
- NFL champion (1947)

Career NFL statistics
- Games played: 86
- Games started: 59
- Fumble recoveries: 6
- Stats at Pro Football Reference

Chester Noyes Bulger (September 18, 1917 – February 18, 2009) was an American professional football player and coach. He played professionally as a tackle in the National Football League (NFL) for the Chicago Cardinals. Bulger was born in Rumford, Maine, and after graduating from Stephen's High School, he attended Auburn University on a track and field scholarship, where he then walked onto the football team. Bulger played for the Chicago Cardinals from 1942 to 1949, where he was part of the line that helped lead the Cardinals to the NFL Championship in 1947. After retiring from football in 1951, Bulger remained in Chicago and became a teacher, coach, and eventual athletic director at De La Salle Institute. He remained there until 1982 and was subsequently an integral member of the school's development office into the early 1990s. In 2007, De La Salle honored Bulger's contributions to the school by renaming the main athletic field in his honor.

Bulger served as the head football coach at Saint Mary's College—now known as Saint Mary's University of Minnesota—Winona, Minnesota for one season, in 1954. Saint Mary's football program was disbanded after the season.

Bulger died of natural causes on February 18, 2009, at his home in Fairfax, Virginia. He was 91.

== Head coaching record ==
Year	Team	Overall	Conference	Standing	Bowl/playoffs
Saint Mary's Redmen (Minnesota Intercollegiate Athletic Conference) (1954)
1954	Saint Mary's	0–8	0–6	T–8th	
Saint Mary's:		0–8	0–6		
Total:		0–8			
