= John Grigas =

American football player (1920–2000)

No. 50, 66, 36, 15
- Positions: Fullback, halfback

Personal information
- Born: August 19, 1920; Chelsea, Massachusetts, U.S.
- Died: May 19, 2000 (aged 79); Worcester, Massachusetts, U.S.
- Listed height: 6 ft 0 in (1.83 m)
- Listed weight: 204 lb (93 kg)

Career information
- High school: Chelsea
- College: Holy Cross (1939–1942)
- NFL draft: 1943: 2nd round, 14th overall pick

Career history
- Chicago Cardinals (1943); Card-Pitt (1944); Boston Yanks (1945–1947)

Awards and highlights
- First-team All-NFL (1944); NFL kickoff return yards leader (1944); Second-team All-American (1941); Holy Cross Varsity Club Hall of Fame (1976)

Career NFL statistics
- Rushing yards: 1,581
- Rushing average: 3.4
- Receptions: 30
- Receiving yards: 379
- Total touchdowns: 11
- Stats at Pro Football Reference

John Joseph Grigas (August 19, 1920 – May 19, 2000) was an American professional football player. He played college football for the Holy Cross Crusaders football team from 1940 to 1942 and professional football in the National Football League (NFL) from 1943 to 1947. He was selected as a second-team All-American in 1941, a first-team All-NFL player in 1944, and led the NFL in all-purpose yards in 1944.

== Early life ==
Grigas was born Chelsea, Massachusetts, in 1920 and attended Chelsea High School.

== College career ==
Grigas enrolled at the College of the Holy Cross in 1939 and played college football for the Crusaders football team from 1940 to 1942. He was later inducted into the Holy Cross Varsity Club Hall of Fame.

On September 27, 1941, Grigas gained national attention after he rushed for 192 yards on 26 carries and scored all three Holy Cross touchdown in a 19–13 victory over LSU at Baton Rouge, Louisiana. He ranked third nationally behind Frank Sinkwich and Bill Dudley with 709 rushing yards in 1941. At the end of his junior season, Grigas was selected by the International News Service as a second-team back on its 1941 College Football All-America Team, and by the Newspaper Enterprise Association as a third-team All-American.

On November 28, 1942, Grigas was responsible for four touchdowns (two rushing, two passing) in a 55–12 upset victory over undefeated Boston College. He played in the 1942 Blue–Gray Football Classic and was credited by the Associated Press with "brilliant play" in the game.

== Professional football ==
In March 1943, Grigas reported in Boston for induction into the Army, but he was rejected due to an undisclosed ailment. Grigas instead opted to play professional football after being selected by the Chicago Cardinals in the second round, 14th overall pick, of the 1943 NFL draft.

During the 1943 season, Grigas appeared in all 10 games, principally as a fullback, for a Chicago Cardinals team that compiled a winless 0–10 record. In his rookie season, he was the Cardinals leading rusher and gained 558 yards from scrimmage, 333 rushing yards, and 225 receiving yards.

During the 1944 season, Grigas appeared in nine games for the Card-Pitt (a temporary wartime merger of the Pittsburgh Steelers and Chicago Cardinals), a team that compiled a winless 0–10 record. Grigas ranked first in the NFL with 1,154 all-purpose yards and 471 kickoff return yards, second with 1,300 yards of total offense and 610 rushing yards, and eighth with 690 passing yards. On November 12, 1944, he outgained the entire Detroit Lions team 123 rushing yards to 78 and 177 passing yards to 41, but the Lions still won, 21–7. At the end of the 1944 season, Grigas was selected as a first-team All-NFL player by the International News Service and as a second-team All-NFL player by the United Press International. He was also one of six players to receive votes in balloting for the NFL Most Valuable Player Award.

Grigas could have accumulated even more impressive statistics in 1944, but he quit the team before the final game, leaving the team with a letter citing his mental exhaustion at playing with a team that had gone 0–9 in the first nine games. Grigas wrote:

"My action, for what I just did, may not be the best in regard to good, ethical business. Think what you may of me, but I sincerely believe that in all justice it is for the best. I had that desire which you so often mentioned in your lectures, but how long a person can have any desire depends on the frame of mind under which he plays. The human mind is the faculty of the soul, which is influenced by the human body. When your mind is changed because of the physical beating, week in and week out, your soul isn't in the game. . . . I tried to stick it out, but it has reached the stage where the mind is stronger than the will."

Chicago coach Phil Handler later explained Grigas decision as follows:

"He worked days in a steel mill at a job where he had to stand all the time. The team practiced at night and because of a shortage of backs Grigas had to work out both on offense and defense. Then Sundays he played sixty-minute football. The strain was too great, and he finally gave up."

In early September 1945, the Boston Yanks acquired Grigas from the Cardinals in exchange for reserve list players and cash. During the 1945 season, Grigas appeared in all 10 games for the Yanks and totaled only 160 rushing yards on 64 carries for an average of 2.5 yards per carry. In 1946, Grigas rebounded with 426 rushing yards (seventh in the NFL) on 84 carries for an average of 5.2 yards per carry.

In his final NFL season, Grigas gained only 52 rushing yards on 27 carries for Boston, missing part of the season with injuries. In January 1948, Grigas was traded by Boston to the Detroit Lions in exchange for quarterback Roy Zimmerman. However, he did not appear in any regular season NFL games after the 1947 season.

== NFL career statistics ==
Legend
**Bold**	Career high

Year	Team	Games		Rushing					Receiving				
Year	Team	GP	GS	Att	Yds	Avg	Lng	TD	Rec	Yds	Avg	Lng	TD
1943	CRD	10	7	105	333	3.2	28	**3**	**19**	**225**	11.8	39	0
1944	Card-Pitt	9	9	**185**	**610**	3.3	29	**3**	2	33	16.5	36	0
1945	BOS	10	8	64	160	2.5	45	2	5	59	11.8	29	0
1946	BOS	11	9	84	426	**5.1**	**59**	2	3	61	**20.3**	**44**	**1**
1947	BOS	9	2	27	52	1.9	13	0	1	1	1.0	1	0
Career		49	35	465	1,581	3.4	59	10	30	379	12.6	44	1

== Later life ==
After retiring from the NFL, Grigas worked for 35 years as an industrial engineer for the American Optical Co. in Southbridge, Massachusetts. He and his wife, Helen, had two daughters. He died in Worcester, Massachusetts, in 2000 at age 79.
