= Conway Baker =

American football player (1911–1997)

No. 22
- Positions: Guard, tackle

Personal information
- Born: September 9, 1911; Marlin, Texas, U.S.
- Died: May 28, 1997 (aged 85); Shreveport, Louisiana, U.S.
- Listed height: 5 ft 11 in (1.80 m)
- Listed weight: 228 lb (103 kg)

Career information
- High school: C. E. Byrd (Shreveport, Louisiana)
- College: Centenary

Career history
- Chicago Cardinals (1936–1943); Card-Pitt (1944); Chicago Cardinals (1945)

Career statistics
- Games: 96
- FG made / FG att.: 1 / 4
- Fumbles recovered: 1
- Stats at Pro Football Reference

Conway Oscar Baker (September 9, 1911 – May 28, 1997) was an American football player who played professionally as a guard and tackle in the National Football League (NFL) for the Chicago Cardinals from 1936 to 1945. He was also a member of the combined Cardinals and Pittsburgh Steelers squad known in as Card-Pitt in 1944. Baker attended C. E. Byrd High School in Shreveport, Louisiana and played college football at Centenary College of Louisiana.

Baker later worked for City of Shreveport Traffic Engineering Department. He died May 28, 1997, in Shreveport, after suffering from Alzheimer's disease.
