= Mitchell Ucovich =

American football player (1915–1989)

No. 53
- Position: Tackle / Guard

Personal information
- Born: September 27, 1915; San Jose, California
- Died: December 1, 1989 (aged 74)

Career information
- College: San Jose State

Career history
- Washington Redskins (1944); Chicago Cardinals (1945); Baltimore Colts (1949)

Career statistics
- Games played: 9
- Stats at Pro Football Reference

Mitchell A. Ucovich (September 27, 1915 – December 1, 1989) was an American football offensive lineman in the National Football League (NFL) for the Washington Redskins, Chicago Cardinals, and the Baltimore Colts. Ucovich played college football at San Jose State University.
