= Elmer Merkovsky =

American football player (1917–1982)

No. 17, 36
- Position: Halfback

Personal information
- Born: April 13, 1917; North Braddock, Pennsylvania, U.S.
- Died: June 28, 1982 (aged 65); Long Beach, California, U.S.
- Listed height: 6 ft 1 in (1.85 m)
- Listed weight: 239 lb (108 kg)

Career information
- High school: Scott Township (PA)
- College: Pitt

Career history
- Card-Pitt (1944); Pittsburgh Steelers (1945–1946)

Awards and highlights
- National champion (1937)

Career statistics
- Games played: 23
- Stats at Pro Football Reference

Albert J. Merkovsky (April 13, 1917 – June 28, 1982) was a professional football player in the National Football League (NFL). He played in the league from 1944 to 1945. He played for the Pittsburgh Steelers and "Card-Pitt", a team that was the result of a temporary merger between the Chicago Cardinals and the Steelers. The teams' merger was a result of the manning shortages experienced league-wide due to World War II.

Prior to his professional career, Merkovsky played college football at the University of Pittsburgh. In 1939, he played in three college football All-Star Games, located in Boston, Providence and New York. After leaving professional football he worked as a machinist. He had five sons and one daughter with his wife, Mildred.

He died on June 28, 1982 in Long Beach, California at the age of 65.
