= Freeman Rexer =

American football player (1918–1964)

Profile
- Position: Wide receiver

Personal information
- Born: 18 June 1918; Houston, Texas, U.S.
- Died: 9 April 1964 (aged 45); Galveston, Texas, U.S.
- Listed height: 6 ft 1 in (1.85 m)
- Listed weight: 211 lb (96 kg)

Career information
- College: Tulane

Career history
- Chicago Cardinals (1943, 1945); Boston Yanks (1944); Detroit Lions (1944)
- Stats at Pro Football Reference

Freeman Rexer (18 June 1918 – 9 April 1964) was an American professional football player who played wide receiver for the Chicago Cardinals, Boston Yanks, and Detroit Lions.
