= Walt Kiesling =

American football player and coach (1903–1962)

No. 16, 21, 18, 2, 49, 60, 35
- Position: Guard

Personal information
- Born: May 27, 1903; Saint Paul, Minnesota, U.S.
- Died: March 2, 1962 (aged 58); Pittsburgh, Pennsylvania, U.S.
- Listed height: 6 ft 3 in (1.91 m)
- Listed weight: 260 lb (118 kg)

Career information
- High school: Cretin (Saint Paul)
- College: St. Thomas (MN) (1923–1925)

Career history

Playing
- Duluth Eskimos (1926–1927); Pottsville Maroons (1928); Chicago Cardinals (1929–1933); Chicago Bears (1934); Green Bay Packers (1935–1936); Pittsburgh Pirates (1937–1938)

Coaching
- Pittsburgh Pirates (1937–1938) Line coach; Pittsburgh Pirates / Steelers (1939–1942) Head coach; Steagles (1943) Co-head coach; Card-Pitt (1944) Co-head coach; Green Bay Packers (1945–1948) Line coach; Pittsburgh Steelers (1949–1953) Line coach; Pittsburgh Steelers (1954–1956) Head coach; Pittsburgh Steelers (1957–1961) Aide

Awards and highlights
- NFL champion (1936); 3× First-team All-Pro (1929, 1930, 1932); Second-team All-Pro (1931); NFL 1920s All-Decade Team; Pittsburgh Steelers Hall of Honor

Career NFL statistics
- Games played: 125
- Games started: 81
- Stats at Pro Football Reference

Head coaching record
- Career: 30–55–5 (.361)
- Coaching profile at Pro Football Reference
- Pro Football Hall of Fame

Walter Andrew Kiesling (May 27, 1903 – March 2, 1962) was an American professional football guard and coach who spent 36 years in the National Football League (NFL). He was posthumously inducted into the Pro Football Hall of Fame in 1966 and was named to the NFL 1920s All-Decade Team in 1969.

A native of Saint Paul, Minnesota, Kiesling played college football at the University of St. Thomas where he was selected as an all-state player from 1923 to 1925. He then played 13 years as a guard (and his first season as a tackle) in the NFL with the Duluth Eskimos (1926–1927), Pottsville Maroons (1928), Chicago Cardinals (1929–1933), Chicago Bears (1934), Green Bay Packers (1935–1936), and Pittsburgh Pirates (1937–1938). He was a first-team All-Pro in 1929, 1930, and 1932, a second-team All-Pro in 1931, and played for the Packers 1936 NFL championship team.

Kiesling also spent 25 years as a coach or aide for NFL teams, including seven years as head coach of the Pittsburgh Pirates / Steelers from 1939 to 1942 and 1954 to 1956. He led the Steelers to their first winning season in 1942. He also served as co-head coach of the wartime merger teams known as the Steagles in 1943 and Card-Pitt in 1944 and as line coach for the Pirates (1937–1938), Green Bay Packers (1945–1948), and Steelers (1949–1953). He retired from active coaching for health reasons in 1957 but remained an aide to the Steelers coaching staff from 1957 to 1961.

== Early life ==
Kiesling was born in 1903 in Saint Paul, Minnesota. His parents, Wenzel and Barbara Kiesling, were natives of Bohemia who immigrated to the United States in 1890 and 1888, respectively. Kiesling had a younger brother, Edward. His father worked as a cutter in a leather works and later in a garment factory.

Kiesling attended Cretin High School, a Catholic high school in Saint Paul where he played football as a tackle. He remained in Saint Paul for college, attending the University of St. Thomas. He played football at St. Thomas and was selected as an all-state player for three straight years in 1923, 1924, and 1925. He graduated in 1926 with a Bachelor of Science degree in mathematics.

== Professional playing player ==
=== Duluth and Pottsville ===
In the fall of 1926, Kiesling joined the Duluth Eskimos of the National Football League (NFL), appearing in 11 games as a tackle for a team that featured star backs Ernie Nevers and Johnny Blood. He remained in Duluth for the 1927 season, moving to the guard position and appearing in six games.

Kiesling joined the Pottsville Maroons for the 1927 season, starting 10 games at right guard.

=== Chicago Cardinals ===
Kiesling next joined the Chicago Cardinals where he played at the left guard position from 1929 to 1933. During his prime years with the Cardinals, he was recognized as one of the leading linemen in the NFL.

- In 1929, he started 12 games at left guard and was selected as a first-team All-Pro by Collyer's Eye magazine.
- In 1930, he appeared in 11 games, nine as a starter, and was selected as a first-team All-Pro in 1930 by both Collyer's Eye and the Green Bay Press-Gazette, based on the returns of ballots sent to the league's coaches, club officials, sports writers and officials,
- In 1931, he started nine games at left guards and was selected as a second-team All-Pro by the United Press, the Green Bay Press-Gazette, and Collyer's Eye.
- In 1932, he started 10 games at left guard and was selected as a first-team All-Pro by the Associated Press.

Kiesling was the Cardinals' heaviest player, ranging from 235 to 260 pounds at six feet, three inches. He was reputed to be "excellent on defense and unusually shifty on offense." He was also known as "a smart guard, a sure tackler despite his bulk and adept at rushing a passer."

During his NFL career, Kiesling lived in Saint Paul in the off-season, operating a cafe and playing as a pitcher and outfielder for a semi-pro baseball team. He also played league baseball in Montana and Canada.

=== Bears and Packers ===
In August 1934, George Halas signed Kiesling to a one-year contract with the Chicago Bears. Kiesling appeared in 13 games for the Bears, only five as a starter.

In August 1935, Kiesling signed with the Green Bay Packers. At the time of his signing, the Green Bay Press-Gazette wrote:

Kiesling is one of the most experienced players in the pro grid game. Practically no one gains through his side of the line consistently ... Kiesling never dissipates, and trains in the year around, remaining always in top condition.

Kiesling appeared in 10 games for the Packers in 1935. He also appeared in eight games for the 1936 Green Bay Packers team that won the NFL championship.

== Coaching career ==
=== Pittsburgh Pirates/Steelers ===
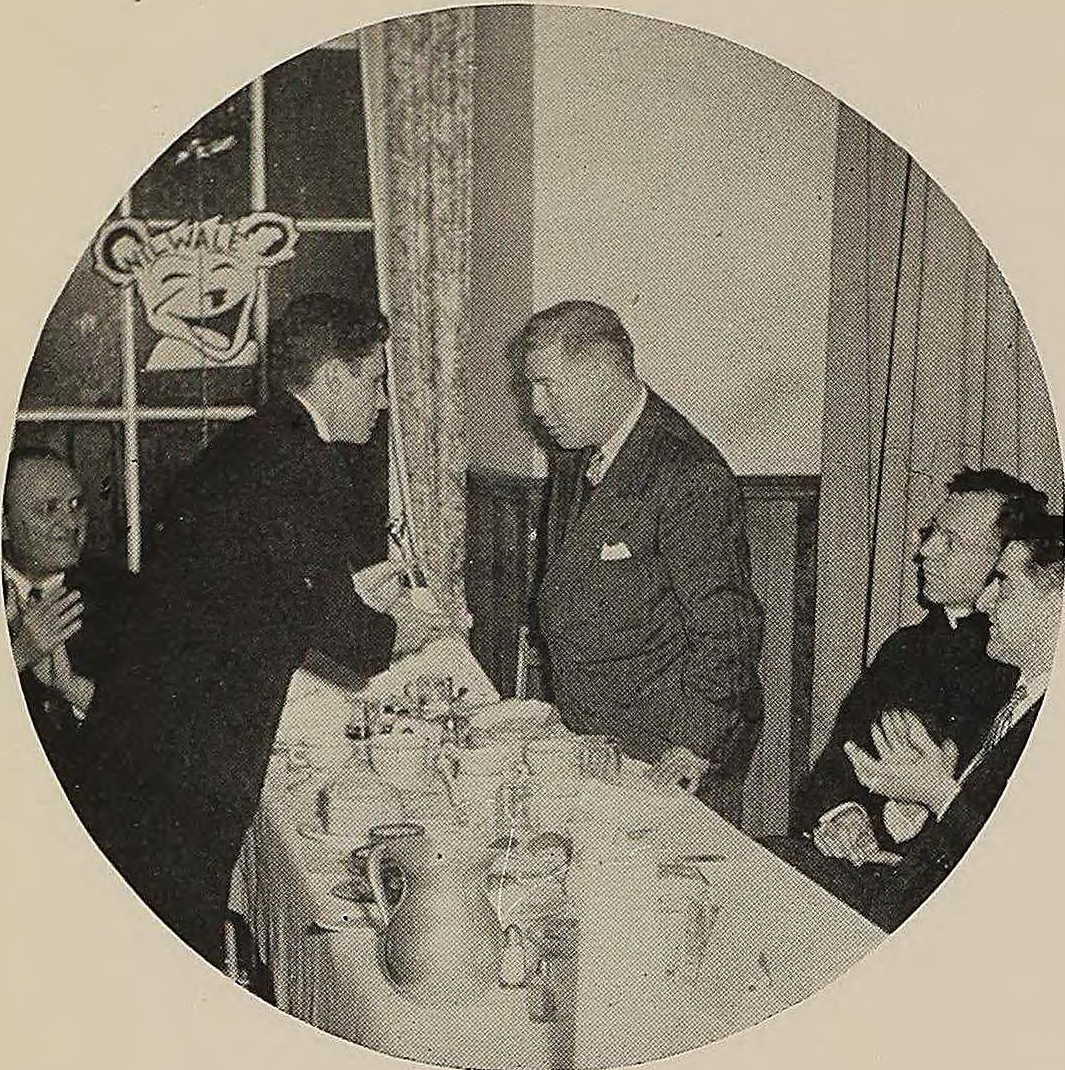
Kiesling (seated- left) at a luncheon for Art Rooney, founder of the Pittsburgh Steelers, in 1952

Kiesling began his coaching career at age 34 during the 1937 season as an assistant under Johnny Blood for the Pittsburgh Pirates (renamed the Steelers in 1940). He also made 12 cameo appearances as a player in the 1937 and 1938 seasons. When Blood resigned as head coach after the team lost the first three games of the 1939 season, team owner Art Rooney hired the recently retired Kiesling as the team's new head coach. Kiesling led the Pirates to a 1–6–1 record in the final eight games of the 1939 season.

The Pirates were renamed the Steelers in 1940, and Kiesling led them to a 2–7–2 record during the 1940 season. He was replaced by Bert Bell and Aldo Donelli in 1941. Kiesling resumed his role as head coach near the end of the 1941 season, leading the team to a 1–2–1 in the final four games.

Kiesling led the 1942 Steelers to a 7–4 record, the first winning season in club history since the team was formed in 1933. Kiesling's 1942 team was led on the field by rookie halfback Bill Dudley who totaled 1,138 yards of total offense (696 rushing and 438 passing) and also had 576 yards on punt and kickoff returns. Dudley was drafted into Army after the 1942 season.

In 1943, with so many players lost to military service, the Steelers were temporarily merged with the Philadelphia Eagles to form the Steagles. Kiesling and the Eagles' coach Greasy Neale served as co-coaches of the Steagles. The Steagles compiled a 5–4–1 record.

In 1944, the Steelers were still lacking players due to the war and formed a one-year merger with the Chicago Cardinals, operating under the name Card-Pitt. Kiesling and the Cardinals' coach Phil Handler served as co-coaches. Despite the play of John Grigas, a Cardinals back who led the NFL in 1944 with 1,154 all-purpose yards and 471 kickoff return yards, the Card-Pitt team gave up 32.8 points per game, compiled a 0–10 record, and was outscored by a combined total of 328–108.

=== Green Bay Packers ===
In January 1945, Kiesling resigned as the Steelers' coach. Hours after resigning his position with the Steelers, Kiesling was hired as assistant coach for the Green Bay Packers. He coached the Packers' linemen, and in December 1945, he signed a contract extending his service through the 1947 season. In January 1948, his contract was renewed again through the 1948 season. At the time, Curly Lambeau called Kiesling the top line coach in college or professional football.

Kiesling contracted pneumonia in the winter of 1947 and lost 51 pounds while battling the illness. In February 1949, Kiesling was released by the Packers, with Lambeau advising Kiesling "in the interests of his health to take a year's vacation from football."

=== Return to the Steelers ===
Ignoring Lambeau's advice, Kiesling returned to the Steelers in March 1949 as the line coach. He signed a contract extension with the Steelers in March 1950, and remained as line coach through the 1953 season.

In March 1952, Kiesling was hospitalized with what was described as a "heavy cold". In November 1953 he was hospitalized again with pneumonia. Starting with his 1947 bout with pneumonia, Kiesling was plagued with respiratory ailments for the rest of his life.

In late August 1954, Joe Bach resigned as the Steelers' head coach after a poor showing by the team in exhibition games, and Kiesling was promoted to head coach. In his third stint as head coach, Kiesling led the Steelers to records of 5–7 in 1954, 4–8 in 1955, and 5–7 in 1956.

Kiesling is often remembered as the coach who released Johnny Unitas, a player widely acclaimed as one of the greatest in NFL history. The Steelers had selected Unitas, a Pittsburgh native, in the ninth round of the 1955 NFL draft. Kiesling was satisfied with Jim Finks and Ted Marchibroda as his quarterbacks and was unimpressed by the gangly Unitas. He did not allow Unitas to even play in any exhibition games, and after pre-season camp, Kiesling told Rooney: "Unitas is too dumb. He can't remember plays."

Kiesling's health was declining by the mid-1950s. Steelers' owner Art Rooney considered firing him, but concluded that loyalty outweighed winning. Rooney reportedly said, "Walt will be my head coach as long as he wants to be, and even if he doesn't want to be." Kiesling's health was poor during the 1956 season, yet he returned for the pre-season in 1957, finally retiring in late August 1957. He remained an aide to the Steelers' coaching staff until his death.

Kiesling's overall record as an NFL head coach was 30–55–5.

=== Head coaching record ===
Team	Year	Regular season					Postseason			
Team	Year	Won	Lost	Ties	Win percentage	Finish	Won	Lost	Win percentage	Result
Pittsburgh	1939	1	6	1	.143	4th in NFL East	–	–	–	–
Pittsburgh	1940	2	7	2	.222	4th in NFL East	–	–	–	–
Pittsburgh	1941	1	2	1	.333	5th in NFL East	–	–	–	–
Pittsburgh	1942	7	4	0	.637	2nd in NFL East	–	–	–	–
Steagles	1943	5	4	1	.556	3rd in NFL East	–	–	–	–
Card-Pitt	1944	0	10	0	.000	5th in NFL West	–	–	–	–
Pittsburgh	1954	5	7	0	.417	4th in NFL East	–	–	–	–
Pittsburgh	1955	4	8	0	.333	6th in NFL East	–	–	–	–
Pittsburgh	1956	5	7	0	.417	4th in NFL East	–	–	–	–
Total		30	55	5	.353		–	–	–	

== Family, later years, and honors ==
Kiesling was married in approximately 1932. At the time of his death, he was married to Irene Andreen Kiesling. No record has been found of Kiesling having any children.

Kiesling suffered from a respiratory ailment that resulted in multiple hospitalizations in his later years. He died in March 1962 at age 58 at Divine Providence Hospital in Pittsburgh. The cause of death was acute bacteremia due to pyelonephritis. He was buried at Christ Our Redeemer Catholic Cemetery in Pittsburgh.

Kiesling was posthumously inducted into the Pro Football Hall of Fame in 1966. In 1969, he was also selected by the Pro Football Hall of Fame as a guard on the NFL 1920s All-Decade Team.
