= Bernie Semes =

American football player (1919–2001)

Profile
- Position: Halfback

Personal information
- Born: January 29, 1919; Braddock, Pennsylvania
- Died: January 30, 2001 (aged 82); Beaver, Pennsylvania

Career information
- College: Duquesne University

Career history
- 1944: "Card-Pitt"
- Stats at Pro Football Reference

Bernard Semes (January 29, 1919 – January 30, 2001) was a professional football player in the National Football League during the year of 1944. He played for "Card-Pitt" a team that was the result of a temporary merger between the Chicago Cardinals and Pittsburgh Steelers. The teams' merger was due to the league-wide manning shortages brought on by World War II.

Prior to playing professionally, Semes played at the college level for Duquesne University. In 1978, he was inducted into the school's sports hall of fame. He and his wife, Libby, had three children; Ann Semes Lynch, James Semes, and Elizabeth "Beth" Semes.
