= Fred Shook =

American football player (1919–1992)

No. 11, 36
- Position: Center / Linebacker

Personal information
- Born: March 30, 1919; Fort Worth, Texas, U.S.
- Died: April 16, 1992 (aged 73); Montgomery, Alabama, U.S.
- Listed height: 6 ft 0 in (1.83 m)
- Listed weight: 218 lb (99 kg)

Career information
- High school: North Side (Fort Worth, Texas)
- College: TCU (1937–1939)
- NFL draft: 1940: undrafted

Career history
- Long Island Indians (1940); Chicago Cardinals (1941)

Awards and highlights
- National champion (1938)
- Stats at Pro Football Reference

Fredric Warden Shook (March 30, 1919 – April 16, 1992) was an American professional football player who played one season with the Chicago Cardinals of the National Football League (NFL). He played college football at Texas Christian University.

== Early life and college ==
Fredric Warden Shook was born on March 30, 1919, in Fort Worth, Texas. He attended North Side High School in Fort Worth.

Shook played college football for the TCU Horned Frogs of Texas Christian University. He was a member of the freshman team in 1937 and a two-year letterman from 1938 to 1939. He was a member of the Horned Frogs team that were consensus national champions in 1938.

== Professional career ==
Shook played in nine games, all starts, for the Long Island Indians of the American Association in 1940.

He played in four games for the Chicago Cardinals of the National Football League in 1941.

== Personal life ==
Shook served in the United States Army and United States Air Force. He died on April 16, 1992, in Montgomery, Alabama.
