= Earl Nolan =

Canadian gridiron football player (1911–1991)

Michael Earl Nolan
- Born: January 11, 1911; Vancouver, British Columbia, Canada
- Died: April 6, 1991 (aged 80); Tucson, Arizona, U.S.
- Football career

Profile
- Position: Tackle

Personal information
- Listed height: 6 ft 0 in (1.83 m)
- Listed weight: 210 lb (95 kg)

Career information
- College: Arizona (1934–1935, 1936)

Career history
- Chicago Cardinals (1937–1938)
- Military career
- Allegiance: United States
- Branch: United States Marine Corps
- Service years: 1940–1945
- Rank: Captain
- Conflicts: World War II
- Awards: Silver Star

Michael Earl Nolan (January 11, 1911 – April 6, 1991) was an American football player, boxer and a United States Marine. Nicknamed "King Kong" for his size, he played college football for the Arizona Wildcats, where he was twice an All-Border Conference selection and in 1936 was All-America honorable mention. He later played professionally, the first Wildcat to do so, for the Chicago Cardinals of the National Football League from 1937 to 1938.

As an amateur boxer, Nolan won the Southwestern AAU heavyweight title in 1934, 1935 and 1936.

Nolan served in the United States Marine Corps during World War II where he rose to the rank of captain and was awarded the Silver Star.
