= Gil Duggan =

American football player (1914–1974)

- Duggan in 1946

Profile
- Positions: Blocking back Tackle

Personal information
- Born: December 16, 1914; Benton, Arkansas, USA
- Died: October 1, 1974 (aged 59); Harrah, Oklahoma, USA
- Listed height: 6 ft 3 in (1.91 m)
- Listed weight: 229 lb (104 kg)

Career information
- College: Oklahoma

Career history
- 1940: New York Giants
- 1941–1943: Chicago Cardinals
- 1944: "Card-Pitt"
- 1945: Chicago Cardinals
- 1946: Los Angeles Dons
- 1947: Buffalo Bills

Awards and highlights
- Second-team All-American (1939); 2× First-team All-Big Six (1938, 1939)

Career NFL statistics
- Games played: 72
- Starts: 36

Gilford R. Duggan (December 16, 1914 – October 1, 1974) was an American professional football player in the National Football League (NFL) and later the All-America Football Conference (AAFC). He played college football for the Oklahoma Sooners. Duggan played in the NFL from 1940 to 1945. He played for the New York Giants, Chicago Cardinals and "Card-Pitt", a team that was the result of a temporary merger between the Cardinals and the Pittsburgh Steelers. The teams' merger was result of the manning shortages experienced league-wide due to World War II.

In 1946, Duggan jumped to the rival AAFC, where he played with the Los Angeles Dons in 1946 and the Buffalo Bills in 1947.
