= Bob McGee =

Robert Henri Alphonse McGee (born October 30, 1953, Otter Lake, Quebec, died, January 11, 2026 Ste.Thérèse-de-la-Gatineau, Quebec was a poet active in the 1970s Montreal literary scene. He worked in construction at the Olympic Games site and was a member of the Heavy Equipment Operators Union. He has been included in compilations with the Montreal Vehicule Poets: 10 Poetry Readings: 10 Montreal Poets at the Cegeps (Delta, 1975) and Montreal English Poetry of the 70s (Véhicule Press, 1977). A new and complete collection of his poetry, published and unpublished, and related correspondence is included in The Poetry of Robert Henri Alphonse McGee - Mon Esprit de L'Escalier, by Libbey Griffith, GGEL press, 2025.

== Publications ==
=== Poetry ===
- 3 Dozen Sonnets & Fast Drawings. Montreal, QC: Véhicule Press, 1973.
- The Shanty Horses - James Bay Poems, ISBN 0-919162-5-09, LaSalle, QC: New Delta, 1977.
