= John Perko (American football, born 1914) =

American football player (1914–1973)

Profile
- Positions: Guard, Center

Personal information
- Born: February 20, 1914; Chisholm, Minnesota
- Died: May 8, 1973 (aged 59); Hibbing, Minnesota

Career information
- College: Duquesne
- NFL draft: 1937

Career history
- 1937–1940: Pittsburgh Pirates
- 1944: "Card-Pitt"
- 1945–1947: Pittsburgh Steelers

John Joseph Perko (February 20, 1914 – May 8, 1973) was a professional football player for eight seasons in the National Football League. He played for Pittsburgh Pirates-Steelers his entire career. In 1944, he also played on the Steelers-Chicago Cardinals merged team, "Card-Pitt". Prior to playing professional football, Perko played at the college level while attending Duquesne University.
