= Gordon Wilson (American football) =

American football player (1915–1997)

No. 31, 45, 23, 33
- Positions: Center, guard, tackle

Personal information
- Born: November 23, 1915; Fort Towson, Oklahoma, U.S.
- Died: June 8, 1997 (aged 81); Oklahoma City, Oklahoma, U.S.
- Listed height: 6 ft 0 in (1.83 m)
- Listed weight: 228 lb (103 kg)

Career information
- College: UTEP
- NFL draft: 1941: 16th round, 4th overall pick

Career history
- Cleveland Rams (1941); Columbus Bullies (1941); Chicago Cardinals (1942–1943); Brooklyn Tigers (1944); Boston Yanks (1944); Chicago Cardinals (1945)

Career NFL statistics
- Games played: 39
- Games started: 20
- Stats at Pro Football Reference

Gordon K. Wilson (November 23, 1915 – June 8, 1997) was an American professional football player in the National Football League (NFL) and the third American Football League (AFL). He was selected by the Cleveland Rams in the 1941 NFL draft and played that season with the Rams and the Columbus Bullies of the AFL. In 1942 and 1943, Wilson played with the Chicago Cardinals, before leaving the team to split the 1944 season between the Brooklyn Tigers and Boston Yanks. He returned to Chicago in 1945 for his final season.

== Notes ==
- Brainerd, Steve (1993). "Starting from the Bottom" (PDF). Coffin Corner. 15 (5). Professional Football Researchers Association: 1–8. Archived from the original (PDF) on September 30, 2010.
