= Rock Reed =

American football player (1912–2007)

Profile
- Position: Halfback

Personal information
- Born: August 7, 1912; Bald Knob, Arkansas, US
- Died: July 13, 2007 (aged 94)
- Listed height: 5 ft 8 in (1.73 m)
- Listed weight: 173 lb (78 kg)

Career information
- High school: Haynesville (LA)
- College: LSU

Career history
- Chicago Cardinals (1937–1939)
- Stats at Pro Football Reference

Joseph Thomas "Rock" Reed (August 7, 1912 – July 13, 2007) was an American football player who played as a halfback in the National Football League (NFL) for the Chicago Cardinals. He attended Louisiana State University, where he played college football for the LSU Tigers football team. He scored one touchdown in his professional career: a 45-yard lateral play against the Detroit Lions in Week 10 of the 1937 NFL season.
