= Butch Simas =

American football player (1908–1989)

- Butch Simas, 1930

Profile
- Positions: Quarterback, blocking back

Personal information
- Born: August 31, 1908; Hanford, California
- Died: May 24, 1989 (aged 80); Hermosa Beach, California
- Listed height: 6 ft 0 in (1.83 m)
- Listed weight: 185 lb (84 kg)

Career information
- High school: Hanford (CA)
- College: Saint Mary's (CA)

Career history
- Chicago Cardinals (1932–1933)

Career statistics
- Receiving yards: 32

William T. "Butch" Simas (August 31, 1908 – May 24, 1989) was an American football player.

Simas was born in 1908 in California. He grew up in Tulare, California. He was the son of a butcher and helped his father killing cattle, leading the other boys in town to give him the nickname "Butch".

He attended Hanford High School in Hanford, California. He was the star of Hanford's baseball, basketball, football, and tennis teams, and captain of the swim team.

He attended Saint Mary's College in Moraga, California, playing football, basketball and baseball.

He played professional football in the National Football League (NFL) as a quarterback and blocking back for the Chicago Cardinals. He appeared in 10 NFL games, five as a starter, during the 1932 and 1933 seasons.

Simas died in 1989 in Hermosa Beach, California.
