= Hal Robl =

American football player (1924–2003)

Profile
- Position: Linebacker

Personal information
- Born: January 23, 1924; Oshkosh, Wisconsin
- Died: May 1, 2003 (aged 79); Gleason, Wisconsin
- Listed height: 6 ft 0 in (1.83 m)
- Listed weight: 227 lb (103 kg)

Career information
- College: Wisconsin-Oshkosh

Career history
- Chicago Cardinals (1945)

Career statistics
- Games played: 2
- Stats at Pro Football Reference

Hal Robl (1924–2003) was a linebacker in the National Football League, who played in two games for the Chicago Cardinals during the 1945 NFL season.
