= John Popovich =

American football player and coach (1919–2004)

Profile
- Position: Halfback

Personal information
- Born: March 6, 1918; Monessen, Pennsylvania, U.S.
- Died: February 3, 2004 (aged 85); Monongahela, Pennsylvania, U.S.
- Listed height: 5 ft 8 in (1.73 m)
- Listed weight: 160 lb (73 kg)

Career information
- College: Saint Vincent College

Career history
- 1944: Card-Pitt
- 1945: Pittsburgh Steelers
- Stats at Pro Football Reference

John Popovich (March 6, 1918 – February 3, 2004) was an American football player and coach. He played in the National Football League (NFL) from 1944 to 1945, for the Pittsburgh Steelers and "Card-Pitt", a team that was the result of a temporary merger between the Chicago Cardinals and the Steelers. The merger was result of the manning shortages experienced league-wide due to World War II. Popovich was signed to "Card-Pitt" midway through the season, after he returned from the Army due to a medical discharge. Popovich served as the head football coach at Waynesburg College—now known as Waynesburg University—in Waynesburg, Pennsylvania from 1955 to 1958, compiling a record of 12–16–4.

== Head coaching record ==
| Year | Team | Overall | Conference | Standing | Bowl/playoffs |
|---|---|---|---|---|---|
Waynesburg Yellow Jackets (NAIA independent) (1955–1957)
| 1955 | Waynesburg | 5–2–1 | | | |
| 1956 | Waynesburg | 1–6–1 | | | |
| 1957 | Waynesburg | 3–3–1 | | | |
Waynesburg Yellow Jackets (West Penn Conference) (1958)
| 1958 | Waynesburg | 3–5–1 | 0–3 | 5th | |
| Waynesburg: | | 12–16–4 | 0–3 | | |
| Total: | | 12–16–4 | | | |
