= Coley McDonough =

American football player (1915–1965)

No. 56, 25
- Position: Quarterback

Personal information
- Born: October 10, 1915; North Braddock, Pennsylvania, U.S.
- Died: July 5, 1965 (aged 49); Pittsburgh, Pennsylvania, U.S.
- Listed height: 6 ft 1 in (1.85 m)
- Listed weight: 189 lb (86 kg)

Career information
- College: North Carolina State

Career history
- 1939: Chicago Cardinals
- 1939–1941: Pittsburgh Steelers
- 1944: "Card-Pitt"

Coleman Regis "Coley" McDonough (October 10, 1915 – July 5, 1965) was a professional American football quarterback in the National Football League (NFL). He played four seasons for the Pittsburgh Steelers and the Chicago Cardinals.

== Formative years ==
A native of North Braddock, Allegheny County, Pennsylvania, McDonough graduated from St. Thomas High School. In 1944, he also played for "Card-Pitt", a team that was the result of a temporary merger between the Cardinals and the Steelers. The teams' merger was result of the staffing shortages experienced league-wide due to World War II. Six days before the team's second game of the season, McDonough was drafted into the United States Army.

== Police career and death ==
Coley later became a Pittsburgh, Pennsylvania police officer, and served fifteen years with that department. Coley's badge number was 405.

On July 5, 1965, he was shot and killed in the line of duty, when he and two other officers answered a domestic disturbance call. Leroy Scott, aged twenty-five, had gone to the Godfrey residence after midnight on July 5 to see his sixteen-year old girlfriend, Linda Godfrey, whom he had been barred from seeing. When her father, Aaron, intervened, an argument ensued and police were called to the scene. When police responded, Scott shot McDonough. Two other officers were injured. Aaron Godfrey was also killed, shot mistakenly by police. Scott fled and committed suicide in a nearby field.

McDonough's son and namesake, Coleman McDonough, went on to serve as a lieutenant colonel with the Pennsylvania State Police (1983–2008) and later became chief of the Mt. Lebanon, Pennsylvania Police Department (2009–2015) and superintendent of the Allegheny County Police Department (2016–2021).
