= Card-Pitt =

1944 temporary NFL team season

1944 Chicago-Pittsburgh Cardinals-Steelers season
- Head coach: Phil Handler, Walt Kiesling
- Home stadium: Comiskey Park, Forbes Field

Results
- Record: 0–10
- Division place: 5th NFL Western
- Playoffs: Did not qualify

Card-Pitt was the team created by the temporary merger of two National Football League (NFL) teams, the Chicago Cardinals and the Pittsburgh Steelers, during the 1944 season. It was the second such merger for the Steelers, who had combined with the Philadelphia Eagles in 1943 to form the "Steagles". The arrangement was made necessary by there being a shortage of numerous players due to World War II military service, and was dissolved upon completion of the season. The war ended before the start of the 1945 season, and both teams resumed normal operations. Card-Pitt finished with a 0–10 record in the Western Division, which led sportswriters to derisively label the team the "Car-Pitts", or "carpets".

== History ==
=== Origins ===
The Boston Yanks joined the NFL in 1944, while the Cleveland Rams, who had been unable to field a team in 1943, re-joined the league. This resulted in an 11-team league, and the NFL was unable to devise a schedule that was amenable to all registered teams. NFL commissioner Elmer Layden contacted Art Rooney and Bert Bell of the Steelers to request that their team again merge as a potential solution for the scheduling issue. Rooney agreed, on the condition that at least half of the team's home games would be played at Pittsburgh's Forbes Field.

The choice of a merger partner for the Steelers proved to be a challenging task. Rumors prior to the NFL's annual April meeting indicated that either Cleveland or the Brooklyn Tigers would be the selected partner. Cleveland was considered a logical choice based solely on geographic location, but Layden felt it unfair to ask the Steelers to merge with a team that had been defunct a year earlier. Rooney rejected a proposal to merge with Brooklyn, and was hesitant to merge with the new Boston Yanks. He eventually agreed to combine his Steelers with the Cardinals, who had gone winless in 1943 along with having lost 16 straight games since their last win on October 18, 1942. The merged team would compete in the tougher Western Division, which included the Green Bay Packers and Chicago Bears.

=== Pre-season ===
Training camp for the merged team began in Waukesha, Wisconsin on August 15, 1944, under the direction of co-coaches Walt Kiesling of Pittsburgh and Phil Handler of Chicago. The coaching staff decided before the start of camp to implement a T formation offense. Some of the Steelers' players had been exposed to the 'T' with playing alongside Philadelphia Eagles players the previous year, but the Cardinals had used it very little. Card-Pitt lacked a dependable quarterback, but the team began the season with optimism.

During the team's first game, an exhibition at Shibe Park against the Philadelphia Eagles, that was attended by Babe Ruth, the Eagles scored three first-quarter touchdowns on their way to a 22–0 victory. Card-Pitt regained its footing the following week, but lost 3–0 to a Washington Redskins team that had been predicted to win the game by three touchdowns.

=== 1944 season ===
Card-Pitt opened the regular season portion of its schedule in front of 21,000 spectators at Forbes Field on September 24, 1944, against a Cleveland Rams team led by former Steelers head coach Aldo Donelli. Card-Pitt came back from a 16–0 deficit to take the lead, but a bad punt late in the fourth quarter allowed Cleveland to score the winning touchdown for a final score of 28–23. The team won an exhibition game the next week at Forbes Field, 17–16 over the New York Giants.

"Why don't they call themselves the Car-Pits? I think it's very appropriate as every team in the league walks over them."

— Irate fan letter to the Pittsburgh Post-Gazette

Quarterback Coley McDonough was drafted into the U.S. Army two days before the team's second regular season game, a contest against Green Bay. The Pittsburgh Press gave the team little chance to defeat the Packers, who would go on to win that game 34–7. However, John McCarthy, a rookie out of Saint Francis University in Loretto, Pennsylvania, performed well as McDonough's replacement.

Card-Pitt then met the Chicago Bears, a team missing MVP quarterback Sid Luckman and coach George Halas among a roster that had been depleted by the war and injuries, in the third game of the season. The Pittsburgh Post-Gazette called Card-Pitt's effort against the Bears "pitiful", and the coaching staff became so irate that they fined Johnny Butler, John Grigas and Eberle Schultz $200 apiece for "indifferent play". Upset with the coaches' strict, dictatorial style, the team refused to practice until the fined players received a fair hearing. The players then met with Rooney, and Grigas and Schultz agreed to pay their fines and return to practice. Butler was suspended indefinitely, before being placed on waivers and later claimed by Brooklyn. Rooney eventually rescinded the fines, except for Butler's.

Pittsburgh Post-Gazette sports editor Al Abrams then quoted a disgusted fan as having written, "Why don't they call themselves the Car-Pits? I think it's very appropriate as every team in the league walks over them." The team lost a rematch against the Giants. Midway through their next game against the Washington Redskins, a brawl between the two teams erupted and had to be broken up by police. Coaches Kiesling and Handler were in the middle of the fight, while Rooney, a former boxer, ran to join his team, until he realized that it would be a breach of protocol for an NFL owner to get into a fight with opposing players. The Redskins would go on to win the game, 42–20. Card-Pitt's Cliff Duggan was fined $200 for his role in the fight, however, Rooney paid his fine.

Losses then ensued against the Rams, Packers and Lions, and Grigas left the team to return home to Massachusetts. He had twice won the league rushing title, but had grown tired of losing and retired. Despite his sudden departure, he was named to the New York Daily News All-Pro team, and finished the season with 610 yards rushing, an average of 3.3 yards per carry. His departure was followed by a 49–7 loss to the Bears. The team's 0–10 season tied the Brooklyn Tigers for the league's worst record. The merger of the Chicago Cardinals and the Pittsburgh Steelers was dissolved the day after the season ended. Only five teams since 1944 have gone winless in the NFL for an entire season: the 1960 Dallas Cowboys (0–11–1), the 1976 Tampa Bay Buccaneers (0–14), the (strike shortened) 1982 Baltimore Colts (0–8–1), the 2008 Detroit Lions (0–16) and the 2017 Cleveland Browns (0–16).

=== Aftermath ===
"The season couldn't have turned out any worse than this one."

— Bert Bell, co-owner of the Pittsburgh Steelers, reflecting on the 1944 season

The Card-Pitt punters averaged 32.7 yards per attempt, which, as of 2021, is still the worst mark in NFL history. The team was 0–2 in field goal attempts, while Conway Baker missed four of his 15 extra point tries.

Card-Pitt passers had a 31% completion rate, and threw for just eight touchdowns; their total of 41 interceptions is still the third highest number in NFL history, even more remarkable given the season was incrementally lengthened to 12, 14, 16, and currently 17 games (the 1944 season had 10). McCarthy threw 13 interceptions, had no touchdown passes, and finished with a quarterback rating of 3.0.

Card-Pitt also had the worst run defense in the league, and were outscored 328–108 by opponents.

"The worst team in NFL history."

— Art Rooney, founder of the Pittsburgh Steelers

Eberle Schultz went from a winless 1944 season to an NFL Championship with Cleveland the following year. John Grigas returned to the NFL for three final seasons with the Boston Yanks, and led the team in rushing in 1946. Don Currivan played alongside Grigas for those three seasons, and ranked third in the league in receiving in 1947, and Currivan also saw played with the Los Angeles Rams, being part of the team that lost to Philadelphia in the 1949 NFL Championship Game.

Tackle Chet Bulger and center Vince Banonis would be a part of the 1947 Chicago Cardinals Championship team, while Banonis also played for the Detroit Lions, winning League Championships in 1952 and 1953 (on teams coached by Card-Pitt assistant coach Buddy Parker).

The Cardinals did not win a game again until October 14, 1945 (nearly three years to the day of their last win), when they beat the Chicago Bears 23-14: while it was the Cardinals' only win of the 1945 season, this also ended a 29-game losing streak (an NFL record as of 2021). The Steelers, who had won their last game on November 28, 1943, ended a 14-game losing streak on October 21, 1945, beating the New York Giants 21–7.

In 1947, both teams rose to the top of the league: the Cardinals finished 9–3, beating the Bears in their last game to win the Western Division - their first title since 1925 - while the Steelers finished tied with the Eagles for the Eastern Division.

The Steelers lost a one-game playoff to the Eagles 21–0 in driving snow and rain, and the following week, the Championship Game saw the Cardinals beat the Eagles 28–21 to win their second NFL Championship (and most recent as of 2021).

In 2009, 65 years after merging for a season, the Steelers and the Cardinals (by then based in Glendale, Arizona) played each other in Super Bowl XLIII.

The last remaining active member of Card-Pitt was Vince Banonis, who played his final NFL game in the 1953 season, where he won the championship as a member of the Detroit Lions, although he missed the 1943 and 1945 seasons.

== Preseason ==
=== Schedule ===
Week	Date	Opponent	Result	Record	Venue	Attendance	Sources
1	September 12	at Philadelphia Eagles	L 0–22	0–1			
2	September 18	Washington Redskins	L 0–3	0–2			
3	October 1	at New York Giants	L 0–22	0–3			

== Regular season ==
=== Schedule ===
Game	Date	Opponent	Result	Record	Venue	Attendance	Recap	Sources
1	September 24	**Cleveland Rams**	**L** 28–30	0–1	Forbes Field	30,968	Recap	
—	Bye							
2	October 8	at **Green Bay Packers**	**L** 7–34	0–2	City Stadium	16,535	Recap	
3	October 15	at **Chicago Bears**	**L** 7–34	0–3	Wrigley Field	29,940	Recap	
4	October 22	at New York Giants	**L** 0–23	0–4	Polo Grounds	40,734	Recap	
5	October 29	at Washington Redskins	**L** 20–42	0–5	Griffith Stadium	35,540	Recap	
6	November 5	**Detroit Lions**	**L** 6–27	0–6	Forbes Field	17,743	Recap	
7	November 12	at **Detroit Lions**	**L** 7–21	0–7	Briggs Stadium	13,239	Recap	
8	November 19	**Cleveland Rams**	**L** 6–33	0–8	Comiskey Park	14,732	Recap	
9	November 26	**Green Bay Packers**	**L** 20–35	0–9	Comiskey Park	7,158	Recap	
10	December 3	**Chicago Bears**	**L** 7–49	0–10	Forbes Field	9,069	Recap	
Note: Intra-division opponents are in **bold** text.

== Standings ==
NFL Western Division
	W	L	T	PCT	DIV	PF	PA	STK
Green Bay Packers	8	2	0	.800	7–1	238	141	W1
Chicago Bears	6	3	1	.667	4–3–1	258	172	W2
Detroit Lions	6	3	1	.667	4–3–1	216	151	W4
Cleveland Rams	4	6	0	.400	4–4	188	224	L2
Card-Pitt	0	10	0	.000	0–8	108	328	L10

Note: Tie games were not officially counted in the standings until 1972.

=== Game summaries ===
==== Week 1 (Saturday September 24, 1944): Cleveland Rams ====
	1	2	3	4	Total
Rams	3	13	0	14	30
Card-Pitt	0	7	14	7	28

at Forbes Field, Pittsburgh, Pennsylvania

- Game time:
- Game weather:
- Game attendance: 20,968
- Referee:

Scoring Drives:

- Cleveland – FG Zontini 27
- Cleveland – Kabealo 6 run (West kick)
- Cleveland – Benton 10 run (West kick)
- Chicago-Pittsburgh – Schutz 10 lateral from Thurbon after 52 kick return (Baker kick)
- Chicago-Pittsburgh – Rucinski 40 pass from McDonough (Baker kick)
- Chicago-Pittsburgh – Grigas 3 run (Baker kick)
- Cleveland – Benton 18 pass from Colella (West kick)
- Chicago-Pittsburgh – Butler 67 pass from McDonough (Baker kick)
- Cleveland – Benton 5 pass from Reisz (West kick)

==== Week 2 (Sunday, October 8, 1944): Green Bay Packers ====
	1	2	3	4	Total
Card-Pitt	0	0	0	7	7
Packers	7	14	0	13	34

at East Stadium, Green Bay, Wisconsin

- Game time:
- Game weather:
- Game attendance: 16,535
- Referee:

Scoring Drives:

- Green Bay – Hutson 55 pass from Comp (Sorenson kick)
- Green Bay – Starreturn 2 run (Hutson kick)
- Green Bay – Hutson 7 pass from Comp (Hutson kick)
- Green Bay – Brock 30 run (kick failed)
- Chicago-Pittsburgh – Butler 33 pass from Grigas (Robbnett kick)
- Green Bay – Perkins 83 interception (Hutson kick)

==== Week 3 (Sunday October 15, 1944): Chicago Bears ====
	1	2	3	4	Total
Card-Pitt	0	0	0	7	7
Bears	7	13	0	14	34

at Wrigley Field, Chicago, Illinois

- Game time:
- Game weather:
- Game attendance: 29,940
- Referee:

Scoring Drives:

- Chicago Bears – McLean 8 run (Gudauskas kick)
- Chicago Bears – Fordham 1 run (kick failed)
- Chicago Bears – Berry 51 pass from Long (Gudauskas kick)
- Chicago Bears – Berry 15 pass from Ronzani (Gudauskas kick)
- Chicago-Pittsburgh – Thurbon 25 run (Baker kick)
- Chicago Bears – Grygo 8 run (Gudauskas kick)

==== Week 4 (Sunday October 22, 1944): New York Giants ====
	1	2	3	4	Total
Card-Pitt	0	0	0	0	0
Giants	0	9	7	7	23

at Polo Grounds, New York, New York

- Game time:
- Game weather:
- Game attendance: 40,734
- Referee:

Scoring Drives:

- New York – Paschal 4 run (Strong kick)
- New York – Safety, McCarthy's punt blocked out of end zone by Cope
- New York – Paschal 3 run (Strong kick)
- New York – Paschal 45 run (Cuff kick)

==== Week 5 (Sunday October 29, 1944): Washington Redskins ====
	1	2	3	4	Total
Card-Pitt	0	0	7	13	20
Redskins	7	7	7	21	42

at Griffith Stadium, Washington, D.C.

- Game time:
- Game weather:
- Game attendance: 35,540
- Referee:

Scoring Drives:

- Washington – Aguirre 58 pass from Filchock (Aguirre kick)
- Washington – Aguirre 47 pass from Filchock (Aguirre kick)
- Chicago-Pittsburgh – Grigas 1 run (Baker kick)
- Washington – Moore 75 run (Weldon kick)
- Chicago-Pittsburgh – Grigas 8 run (kick failed)
- Chicago-Pittsburgh – Currivan 7 pass from Grigas (Baker kick)
- Washington – Seymour 3 run (Weldon kick)
- Washington – Seymour 23 pass from Filchock (Weldon kick)
- Washington – Turley 35 pass from Baugh (Weldon kick)

==== Week 6 (Sunday November 5, 1944): Detroit Lions ====
	1	2	3	4	Total
Lions	21	0	6	0	27
Card-Pitt	0	0	0	6	6

at Forbes Field, Pittsburgh, Pennsylvania

- Game time:
- Game weather:
- Game attendance: 17,743
- Referee:

Scoring Drives:

- Detroit – Van Tone 19 pass from Westfall (Sinkwich kick)
- Detroit – Westfall 15 pass from Sinkwich (Sinkwich kick)
- Detroit – Sinkwich 5 run (Sinkwich kick)
- Detroit – Van Tone 10 pass from Sinkwich (Sinkwich kick)
- Chicago-Pittsburgh – Bova 8 pass from Grigas (kick failed)

==== Week 7 (Sunday November 12, 1944): Detroit Lions ====
	1	2	3	4	Total
Card-Pitt	0	0	0	7	7
Lions	7	7	0	7	21

at Briggs Stadium, Detroit, Michigan

- Game time:
- Game weather:
- Game attendance: 13,239
- Referee:

Scoring Drives:

- Detroit – Van Tone 1 yard run (Sinkwich kick)
- Detroit – Sinkwich 2 yard run (Sinkwich kick)
- Chicago-Pittsburgh – Thurbon 1 run (Baker kick)
- Detroit – Sinkwich 12 yard run (Sinkwich kick)

==== Week 8 (Sunday November 19, 1944): Cleveland Rams ====
	1	2	3	4	Total
Rams	6	6	7	14	33
Card-Pitt	0	0	6	0	6

at Comiskey Park, Chicago, Illinois

- Game time:
- Game weather:
- Game attendance: 14,732
- Referee:

Scoring Drives:

- Cleveland – Colella 54 pass from Kabealo (kick failed)
- Cleveland – Zontini 1 run (kick failed)
- Cleveland – Pritko 35 pass from Reisz (Zontini kick)
- Chicago-Pittsburgh – Bova 46 pass from Grigas (kick failed)
- Cleveland – Gillette 58 run (Zontini kick)
- Cleveland – Petchel 43 pass from Reisz (Zontini kick)

==== Week 9 (Sunday November 26, 1944): Green Bay Packers ====
	1	2	3	4	Total
Packers	7	7	7	14	35
Card-Pitt	7	6	0	7	20

at Comiskey Park, Chicago, Illinois

- Game time:
- Game weather:
- Game attendance: 7,158
- Referee:

Scoring Drives:

- Chicago-Pittsburgh – Thurbon 1 run (Baker kick)
- Green Bay – Duhart 1 run (Hutson kick)
- Green Bay – Duhart 11 run (Hutson kick)
- Chicago-Pittsburgh – Thurbon 37 pass from Grigas (kick failed)
- Green Bay – Hutson 36 pass from Comp (Hutson kick)
- Green Bay – Hutson 6 pass from Comp (Hutson kick)
- Green Bay – Perkins 40 interception (Hutson kick)
- Chicago-Pittsburgh – Currivan 72 pass from Grigas (Baker kick)

==== Week 10 (Sunday December 3, 1944): Chicago Bears ====
	1	2	3	4	Total
Bears	7	7	7	28	49
Card-Pitt	0	7	0	0	7

at Forbes Field, Pittsburgh, Pennsylvania

- Game time:
- Game weather:
- Game attendance: 9,069
- Referee:

Scoring Drives:

- Chicago Bears – Berry 9 pass from Ronzani (Gudauskas kick)
- Chicago Bears – Fordham 1 run (Gudauskas kick)
- Chicago-Pittsburgh – Thurbon 1 run (Baker kick)
- Chicago Bears – Famiglietti 23 pass from Ronzani (Gudauskas kick)
- Chicago Bears – Margarita 47 run (Gudauskas kick)
- Chicago Bears – Fordham 2 run (Gudauskas kick)
- Chicago Bears – McEnulty 5 pass from Ronzani (Gudauskas kick)
- Chicago Bears – Turner 48 run (Gudauskas kick)

== Roster ==
1944 Card-Pitt final roster
Quarterbacks: 44 John McCarthy S; 28 Walt Rankin P/S; Backs: 66 John Grigas FB/LB/P; 53 George Magulick RB/CB; 40 John Popovich RB/CB; 33 Bernie Semes RB/CB; 49 Bob Thurbon RB/CB/P; Ends/Receivers: 41 Tony Bova; 63 Don Currivan; 45 Walt Kichefski; 75 Eddie Rucinski RB; 69 Clint Wager	Linemen/Linebackers: 22 Conway Baker G/DG/K; 45 Clarence Booth T/DT/G/DG; 73 Chet Bulger T/DT; 29 Ted Doyle T/DT; 54 Gil Duggan T/DT; 64 Lou Marotti G/DG; 17 Elmer Merkovsky G/DG; 39 John Perko G/DG; 21 Marshall Robnett C/LB; 48 Elbie Schultz T/G/DG/DT; 50 Al Wukits C/LB; Reserve: 55 Coley McDonough QB/S (Military); rookies in italics

== See also ==
- Defunct National Football League franchises
- National Football League franchise moves and mergers
- 1942 SANFL season
