= Lou Marotti =

American football player (1915–2003)

Profile
- Position: Guard

Personal information
- Born: March 28, 1915; Chisholm, Minnesota
- Died: 3 October 2003 (aged 88); Los Gatos, California
- Listed height: 5 ft 10 in (1.78 m)
- Listed weight: 210 lb (95 kg)

Career information
- College: Toledo

Career history
- 1943: Chicago Cardinals
- 1944: Card-Pitt
- 1945: Chicago Cardinals

Louis J. Marotti (1915-2003) was a professional football player in the National Football League. He played in the league from 1943 to 1945. He played for the Chicago Cardinals and "Card-Pitt", a team that was the result of a temporary merger between the Pittsburgh Steelers and the Cardinals. The teams' merger was a result of the manning shortages experienced league-wide due to World War II.
