= Walt Rankin =

American football player (1919–1993)

Profile
- Positions: Fullback, Quarterback

Personal information
- Born: January 28, 1919; Laverty, Oklahoma, U.S.
- Died: November 7, 1993 (aged 74); Lubbock, Texas, U.S.

Career information
- High school: Colorado (TX)
- College: Texas Tech

Career history
- Chicago Cardinals (1941, 1943); Card-Pitt (1944); Chicago Cardinals (1945–1947)

Awards and highlights
- NFL champion (1947)

Career statistics
- Rushing attempts-yards: 22–30
- Receptions-yards: 17–87
- Touchdowns: 0
- Stats at Pro Football Reference

Walter Velpo Rankin (January 28, 1919 – November 7, 1993) was a professional football player in the National Football League (NFL). He played running back for five seasons for the Chicago Cardinals. During World War II, Rankin served in the United States Military. His name is located on the World War II Honor Roll, which shows NFL players who also fought in the war, at the Pro Football Hall of Fame. During the war, however, Rankin also played for "Card-Pitt" a team that was a temporary merger of the Cardinals and Pittsburgh Steelers. The teams merged due to the manning shortages associated with the war.
