= Dixie Stokes =

American football player (1913–1967)

Profile
- Position: Center

Personal information
- Born: August 24, 1913; Haslam, Texas, U.S.
- Died: December 1, 1967 (aged 54); Forrest City, Arkansas, U.S.
- Listed height: 6 ft 0 in (1.83 m)
- Listed weight: 205 lb (93 kg)

Career information
- High school: C. E. Byrd (LA)
- College: Centenary

Career history
- Detroit Lions (1937–1939); Chicago Cardinals (1943)

Career NFL statistics
- Games: 28
- Stats at Pro Football Reference

Lee James "Dixie" Stokes Jr. (August 24, 1913 – December 1967) was an American football player.

Stokes was born in Haslam, Texas, in 1913. He grew up in Shreveport, Louisiana, attended C. E. Byrd High School, and then played college football at Centenary.

He also played professional football in the National Football League (NFL) as a center for the Detroit Lions from 1937 to 1940. He was released by the Lions after the 1940 season and took a job with a Michigan tool company. He made a comeback in 1943 with the Chicago Cardinals, maintaining his weekday job with the tool company while playing football on weekends. He appeared in 28 NFL games, 15 as a starter.

Stokes married Helen Rosenblath in 1938. From 1940 until his death in 1967, he worked as the sales manager of a tool company in Memphis, Michigan. He died from a heart attack in Forrest City, Arkansas, at age 54.
