= Andy Puplis =

American football player and coach (1915–1990)

No. 1
- Positions: Quarterback, defensive back

Personal information
- Born: February 1, 1915; Chicago, Illinois, U.S.
- Died: January 25, 1990 (aged 74)
- Listed height: 5 ft 9 in (1.75 m)
- Listed weight: 180 lb (82 kg)

Career information
- College: Notre Dame

Career history
- 1943: Chicago Cardinals

Awards and highlights
- Third-team All-American (1937)

Andrew Joseph Puplis (February 1, 1915 – January 25, 1990) was an American football player and coach.

As a quarterback at Harrison Tech High School, Puplis twice received all-state honors, and won a Chicago city championship, compiling a 12–0 record in 1931. At Notre Dame, he joined the football team as both a kicker and a kick and punt returner. In 1936, he became the starting quarterback but still led the team in kickoff returns with 5 for 136 yards. In his senior year in 1937, he earned All-American honors as he led the Irish in scoring and averaged 12.4 yards per play. In 1938, Puplis was the starting quarterback for the College All Stars team that defeated the Washington Redskins, 28–16. He had also received monograms for playing on the baseball team, and received an offer from the Cleveland Indians.

After college, Puplis was hired as the head football coach at Crystal Lake High School before moving on to Proviso East High School in Maywood, Illinois, in 1940, where he would remain until his retirement in 1972, except for a hiatus in the Navy during World War II, and one year as a defensive back for the Chicago Cardinals in 1943. (4) During his tenure at Proviso East he would coach eventual NFL stars such as Ray Nitschke and Ed O'Bradovich as well as Eagles defensive coordinator Jim Johnson, and would compile a record of 128-84-12, including three undefeated seasons and six conference titles.

In 1981, Puplis was inducted into the Hall of Fame for the Illinois High School Football Coaches Association.
