= Cal Purdin =

American football player (1921–1982)

- Purdin, c. 1942

No. 11, 73
- Position: Halfback

Personal information
- Born: February 22, 1921; Jefferson, Oklahoma, U.S.
- Died: December 29, 1982 (aged 61); Augusta, Kansas, U.S.
- Listed height: 6 ft 2 in (1.88 m)
- Listed weight: 188 lb (85 kg)

Career information
- High school: Augusta (KS)
- College: Tulsa
- NFL draft: 1943: 25th round, 233rd overall pick

Career history
- Chicago Cardinals (1943); Miami Seahawks (1946); Brooklyn Dodgers (1946)
- Stats at Pro Football Reference

Calvin O'Neal Purdin Sr. (February 22, 1921 – December 29, 1982) was an American football halfback. He played college football for Tulsa from 1939 to 1942 and professional football for the Chicago Cardinals (1943), Miami Seahawks (1946), and Brooklyn Dodgers (1946). He was also a naval pilot during World War II.

== Early life ==
Purdin was born in Jefferson, Oklahoma, in 1921 and attended Augusta High School in Augusta, Kansas. He played college football at Tulsa from 1939 to 1942. He also competed in track and field for Tulsa. He helped lead the 1942 Tulsa Golden Hurricane football team to an undefeated regular season and the No. 4 ranking in the final AP poll.

== Professional football and military service ==
Purdin was selected by the Chicago Cardinals in the 25th round (233rd overall pick) of the 1943 NFL draft. He played for the Cardinals during the 1943 season, appearing in four games. His stay with the Cardinals was cut short as he was inducted into the Naval Air Corps in late October 1943. At the time of his induction, he ranked second in the NFL in pass receiving and had a punting average of 52 yards. While training as a pilot with the Navy, he had a close call when another plane crashed on top of his plane in Memphis, Tennessee.

In 1946, Purdin played in the All-America Football Conference (AAFC) for the Miami Seahawks and Brooklyn Dodgers. He appeared in nine games, four of them as a starter. At Brooklyn, he was reunited with Tulsa teammates Glenn Dobbs and Saxon Judd.

In two seasons of professional football, he tallied 143 receiving yards and 32 rushing yards.

== Family and later years ==
Purdin and his wife Drusilla had a son, Calvin Jr., and two daughters, Diane and Elizabeth.

Purdin ran a dry cleaning plant in Augusta, Kansas, for 35 years from 1945 to 1980. He also served on the Augusta city council, school board, and planning commission. He also served as a municipal court judge from 1971 until his death in 1982. He died in his courtroom at age 60.
