= Ronnie Cahill =

American football player (1915–1992)

No. 63
- Position: Tailback/Quarterback

Personal information
- Born: April 24, 1915; Leominster, Massachusetts, U.S.
- Died: September 6, 1992 (aged 77); Morristown, Vermont, U.S.

Career information
- College: Holy Cross

Career history
- Chicago Cardinals (1943)

Awards and highlights
- First-team All-Eastern (1939); Holy Cross Varsity Club Hall of Fame (1965)
- Stats at Pro Football Reference

Ronald Maurice "Butch" Cahill (April 24, 1915 – September 6, 1992) was a National Football League (NFL) quarterback for the Chicago Cardinals.

He was signed by the Cardinals as a replacement for Bud Schwenk, who had joined the armed forces. In his only NFL season, Cahill led the league in interceptions but did not win any of the ten games in which he played.

In 1946, Cahill signed with the Buffalo Bisons of the newly formed All-America Football Conference (AAFC), but did not appear in any games.
