= Vaughn Stewart (American football) =

American football player (1919–1992)

Vaughn Morton Stewart
Profile
- Position: Center / Linebacker

Personal information
- Born: January 16, 1919; Anniston, Alabama, U.S.
- Died: December 18, 1992 (aged 73); Huntsville, Alabama, U.S.
- Listed height: 6 ft 1 in (1.85 m)
- Listed weight: 190 lb (86 kg)

Career information
- College: University of Alabama

Career history
- 1943: Chicago Cardinals
- 1943: Brooklyn Dodgers
- 1944: Brooklyn Tigers

Vaughn Morton Stewart, (January 16, 1919 — December 18, 1992) a native of Anniston, Alabama, was a collegiate and professional football player.

== Football career ==
Stewart was named to the All-State team while playing at Anniston High School. He played college football for the University of Alabama where he was named was honorable mention, All-SEC on the sophomore selection. Stewart played on the 1941 Crimson Tide National Championship team. At just 165 pounds, he was the smallest center to ever play football at Alabama.

In 1943 he was selected as a center by the Chicago Cardinals of the National Football League. He played nine games in 1943 for Chicago as a center and a linebacker before being traded to the Brooklyn Dodgers before the last game of the season. He played one game for the Brooklyn Dodgers in 1943 and nine games for the renamed Brooklyn Tigers in 1944 before leaving the NFL.

== After football ==
Stewart was the original co-chairman of the board for the Huntsville-Madison County Athletic Hall of Fame. This hall of fame for athletes from Madison County was founded in 1989 thanks to his efforts. Stewart himself was inducted into the hall of fame in 1990. He died in 1992 in Huntsville, Alabama.
