= Phil Handler =

American football player and coach (1908–1968)

No. 7, 46, 11
- Position: Guard

Personal information
- Born: July 21, 1908; Fort Worth, Texas, U.S.
- Died: December 8, 1968 (aged 60); Skokie, Illinois, U.S.
- Listed height: 6 ft 0 in (1.83 m)
- Listed weight: 212 lb (96 kg)

Career information
- College: TCU

Career history

Playing
- 1930–1936: Chicago Cardinals

Coaching
- 1935–1942: Chicago Cardinals (asst.)
- 1943: Chicago Cardinals
- 1944: Card-Pitt (co-coach)
- 1945: Chicago Cardinals
- 1946–1948: Chicago Cardinals (asst.)
- 1949: Chicago Cardinals (co-coach)
- 1950–1951: Chicago Cardinals (asst.)
- 1951: Chicago Cardinals (co-coach)
- 1952–1967: Chicago Bears (asst.)

Awards and highlights
- 2× NFL champion (1947, 1963); Head coaching record: 4–34
- Coaching profile at Pro Football Reference

Philip Jacob Handler (July 21, 1908 – December 8, 1968) was an American football player and coach who spent his entire professional career in the city of Chicago. He had a seven-year, 53-game NFL playing career, during which he was named All-Pro four times. On three occasions, Handler served as head coach of the Chicago Cardinals, and later as an assistant coach for the Chicago Bears. He served as an assistant coach for the Cardinals when they won the 1947 NFL Championship; and with the Bears when they won the 1963 NFL Championship.

== Early life ==
Handler was born in Fort Worth, Texas, and was Jewish. His parents had immigrated to the United States from Lithuania. He was nicknamed "Motsy."

== College career ==
Prior to his professional debut, Handler played college football at Texas Christian University. He played at TCU for three years beginning in 1927 under head coach Francis Schmidt. During his college career, Handler earned All-SWC honors as an offensive guard, and was an Honorable Mention All-American in 1929. In 1929 Handler and the Horned Frogs won the Southwest Conference.

== NFL career ==
After graduating from college in 1930, Handler decided to pursue a career in pro football. However, he was an undersized lineman, standing at just 5 ft 11 in (1.80 m), 190 lb (86 kg). Despite Cardinals' coach Ernie Nevers' dismissive comment upon his arrival with the Cardinals in summer 1930: "You'll never make it kid. You're too small", Handler went on to a seven-year, 53-game NFL playing career with the team, during which he was named All-Pro from 1931 to 1933, and 2nd Team All-Pro (UPI) in 1935. He also served in a player-coach during the 1935 and 1936 seasons.

== Coaching career ==
=== Chicago Cardinals ===
Upon his retirement during the 1937 NFL season, Handler was named a full-time assistant coach. His career with the Cardinals appeared to have ended on November 28, 1938, when he and head coach Milan Creighton resigned following a 2–9 finish, however Handler later reconsidered his decision and continued as an assistant coach.

On July 3, 1943, Handler took over the Cardinals' head coaching duties when head coach Jimmy Conzelman accepted a front office position with baseball's St. Louis Browns. However, with manning shortages due to World War II, the Cardinals lost all 10 games that season. The team then merged with the Pittsburgh Steelers in 1944 to form what was referred to as "Card-Pitt" in the standings. Handler and Walt Kiesling were named the team's co-coaches. That effort also resulted in a winless season in 1944, and after a 1–9 season the next year, Handler gave way for the returning Conzelman.

The return of Conzelman and many of their top players, helped the Cardinals improve to 6–5 in 1946, followed by the franchise's only undisputed NFL title the next season, with a 28–21 victory over the Philadelphia Eagles on December 28, 1947, at Comiskey Park in Chicago. That season Handler was an assistant coach on the Cardinals' NFL Championship team.

In 1949 Conzelman again resigned as head coach of the Cardinals. As a result, Handler and fellow assistant Buddy Parker were named as co-head coaches for the team in a unique arrangement on February 3, 1949. The decision was brought about by the two owners' different coaching preferences. The decision was blamed for the Cardinals 2–4 start that season. However Parker soon took over as sole coach when Handler shifted to a front office role later that season.

When Parker left after the season, Curly Lambeau, the legendary coach and founder of the Green Bay Packers, was hired as his replacement. Upon taking over the coaching position, Lambeau brought back Handler as the team's offensive line coach. However, the new staff continued to struggle, and after a 7–15 mark, Lambeau resigned as the team's coach on December 7, 1951. Handler and Cecil Isbell were then left to coach the team's last two games.

Handler's 0.105 winning percentage is the lowest in NFL history for coaches with at least five seasons.

=== Chicago Bears ===
After more than two decades with the same team, Handler moved to the north side of Chicago to become the offensive line coach for the Chicago Bears on July 19, 1952. There he soon became a top assistant under coach George Halas. In addition to his coaching duties, Handler also served as a scout for the team for the next 16 seasons.

In 1956 Handler helped the team reach the NFL Championship game. He then helped the squad capture the NFL title seven years later, in a storied 14–10 Bears victory over the New York Giants, on a frigid day at Wrigley Field in late 1963.

== Death and legacy ==
Several months after the 1967 NFL season had ended, Handler was vacationing in Florida when he suffered the first of two heart attacks and spent several weeks in a hospital for treatment. Upon his release, doctors decreed that while he could spend time with the team during the week, at practices, and in helping the coaching staff with its weekly game plan, he would not be able to attend Bears' games. Indeed, he was advised not to watch the games — an order Handler did not follow.

On Sunday, December 8, 1968, just moments after a dramatic 17–16 Bears win over the Los Angeles Rams in Los Angeles, he died of his third heart attack at home in Skokie, Illinois. Two days after his death, more than 500 people attended his funeral, with the Bears canceling a team practice so players, coaches, and staff could attend. The following Sunday, December 15, 1968, when the Bears hosted the Green Bay Packers at Wrigley Field, a moment of silence was held before kickoff.

Handler had two children and two grandchildren when he died, and was survived by his wife. Notably, Handler's third grandson was born five days after his death and was not only named after the coach — Philip Handler — but also later worked for the Chicago Bears for 11 years.

Handler is a member of the Chicago Sports Hall of Fame, the Chicago Jewish Sports Hall of Fame, and the B'nai B'rith Jewish Sports Hall of Fame. His 17 seasons as a Chicago Bears assistant rank second in the history of the NFL's oldest franchise. All told, Handler spent 39 years as a player and coach in the NFL.

== See also ==
- List of select Jewish football players
