= 1943 NFL season =

American football season

- 1943 edition of the NFL's press manual

Regular season
- Duration: September 19 – December 26, 1943
- East Champions: Washington Redskins
- West Champions: Chicago Bears

Championship Game
- Champions: Chicago Bears

NFL teams: West, East

The 1943 NFL season marked the 24th year of the National Football League. The league contracted to just eight teams, owing to wartime pressures for manpower, with each team playing a regular season schedule of 10 games — 40 contests in all. The season began Sunday, September 19 and culminated on Sunday, December 12, 1943.

Due to the exodus of players who had left to serve in World War II, the Cleveland Rams were granted permission to suspend operations for this season, while the Philadelphia Eagles and the Pittsburgh Steelers merged for this one season, with the combined team (known as Phil-Pitt and called the "Steagles" by fans) playing four home games in Philadelphia and two in Pittsburgh. With only 8 teams playing, the 1943 season ties the 1932 season for the fewest teams in league history.

The season ended when the Chicago Bears defeated the Washington Redskins, 41–21, in the NFL Championship Game played the day after Christmas, the first time in NFL history that a playoff game was played so late in the year.

== Draft ==
The 1943 NFL draft was held on April 8, 1943, at Chicago's Palmer House Hotel. With the first pick, the Detroit Lions selected runningback Frank Sinkwich from the University of Georgia.

Despite the eventual hiatus of the Cleveland Rams franchise for 1943 and merger of operations of the Philadelphia Eagles and Pittsburgh Steelers, all ten teams participated in the 1943 draft, selecting a total of 300 players.

== Major changes for 1943 ==
=== Rules changes ===
The free substitution rule was adopted. The rule was enacted in response to the depleted team rosters of the World War II period and followed a similar change made to the NCAA's college football rule book in 1941. Previously, under the one-platoon system, players competed both on offense and defense until a substitution was made, at which time the player removed could not return for the duration of the quarter. "Free substitution" allowed players to shuttle in and out of the game without such restriction and would eventually give rise to offensive and defensive specialization — the so-called two-platoon system.

The revised substitution rule stated: "An eligible substitute...may replace a teammate at any time when the ball is dead and time is out.... [H]e must report to the designated Official and he becomes a player when he reports." Players removed were permitted to return after at least one down had transpired.

Under the revised rules of 1943, the wearing of "head protectors" also became mandatory for all players.

=== Coaching changes ===
- Brooklyn Dodgers: Mike Getto was replaced by Pete Cawthon.
- Chicago Cardinals: Jimmy Conzelman was replaced by Phil Handler.
- Detroit Lions: Gus Dorais was hired as new head coach. Bill Edwards was released after three games in 1942, and John Karcis then served for the final eight games.
- Steagles: Philadelphia Eagles head coach Greasy Neale and Pittsburgh Steelers head coach Walt Kiesling served as co-head coaches of the Steagles.
- Washington Redskins: Ray Flaherty was replaced by Dutch Bergman.

=== Stadium changes ===
The merged Steagles split their games between Philadelphia's Shibe Park and Pittsburgh's Forbes Field.

== Military service and team rosters ==
The impact of World War II on team rosters was massive during the 1943 season, with hundreds of players from the league's ten teams removed from the possibility of game play by military service. These were proudly listed as part of an official "Service Roster" by the NFL. With the United States beginning to draft fathers into the military, league officials were concerned about the potential impact of expanded conscription upon their rosters and the player limit was increased from 25 to 28 in an effort to avoid crippling disruption.

The Cleveland Rams were granted permission to suspend operations for the 1943 season. Operations of the NFL's two teams from Pennsylvania, the Philadelphia Eagles and the Pittsburgh Steelers, were also merged for 1943 — reducing the number of participating teams to just eight.

== Pre-season ==
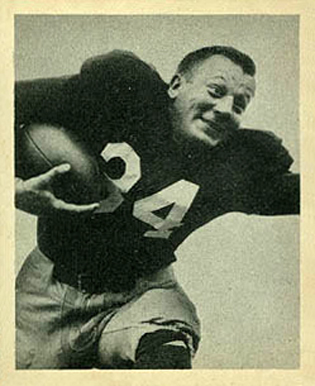
Fullback Pat Harder starred in the 1944 Chicago All-Star Game. He would begin his pro career with the Chicago Cards in 1946.

=== Chicago All-Star Game ===
The annual charity Chicago All-Star Game was played August 25 at Dyche Stadium in Evanston, Illinois. The game pitted the 1942 NFL champion Washington Redskins against a select college all-star team that featured Northwestern tailback Otto Graham.

Ironically, the future Hall of Famer Graham made his greatest mark in the game as a defender, picking off a pass from Redskins' trigger-man Sammy Baugh and taking it back 97 yards for a touchdown. The College stars won the game convincingly, 27–7 — their first triumph over the standing NFL champs since 1938. Star of the game was Wisconsin fullback Pat Harder, the second overall pick in the 1944 NFL draft, who scored once by air and once by land, successfully kicking two extra points to boot.

== Regular season ==
=== Division races ===
The NFL played a shortened schedule of ten games. Despite the war, the league's popularity continued to grow. The league drew a cumulative 1,072,462 fans, which was fewer than 7,000 short of the record set the previous year despite the fact that 15 fewer games were played. The increased attendance was attributed to the higher competitiveness of the weaker squads.

In the Eastern Division, the Phil-Pitt team won its first two games and led at Week Four, with 1–0–0 Washington close behind, while in the Western Division, the Bears and Packers tied 21–21 in their first game and were 2–0–1 after four weeks.

In Week Five, the division leaders played each other on October 17, with the Bears beating the Steagles 48–21 and the Redskins defeating the Packers 33–7, leaving the two winners in first place.

On November 7, the Lions and Giants played what is as of 2024 season the last scoreless tie in NFL history. Although this was the 73rd scoreless tie in NFL history, scoreless ties had gradually become less and less common in the 1930s and early 1940s, and there has not been a scoreless tie in the NFL for 80 years and counting.

The Redskins (5–0–1) and Bears (7–0–1) were still unbeaten going into Week Eleven, and met in Washington on November 21, with the Redskins winning 21–7. The Redskins had their first loss in Week Twelve when they lost to Phil-Pitt, 14–27, on November 28. The Bears clinched the Western Division the same day with a 35–24 win over the Cardinals for an 8–1–1 finish.

In Week Thirteen, Phil-Pitt lost its last game, falling to Green Bay 38–28, and was out of contention at 5–4–1.

Chicago finished its regular season on November 28 and won the Western Division with an 8–1–1 record, but the Bears had to wait for three weeks while the Eastern Division champion was determined.

Washington and the New York Giants ended the regular season by playing against each other on two consecutive Sundays, December 5 and 12 (the second game, originally scheduled on October 3 had been postponed due to heavy rain). The Giants won both games to force a first-place tie at 6–3–1 each. For the third straight weekend, New York and Washington faced each other, with the Redskins winning the final game 28–0 and earning the right to play the Bears for the league championship.

== Final standings ==
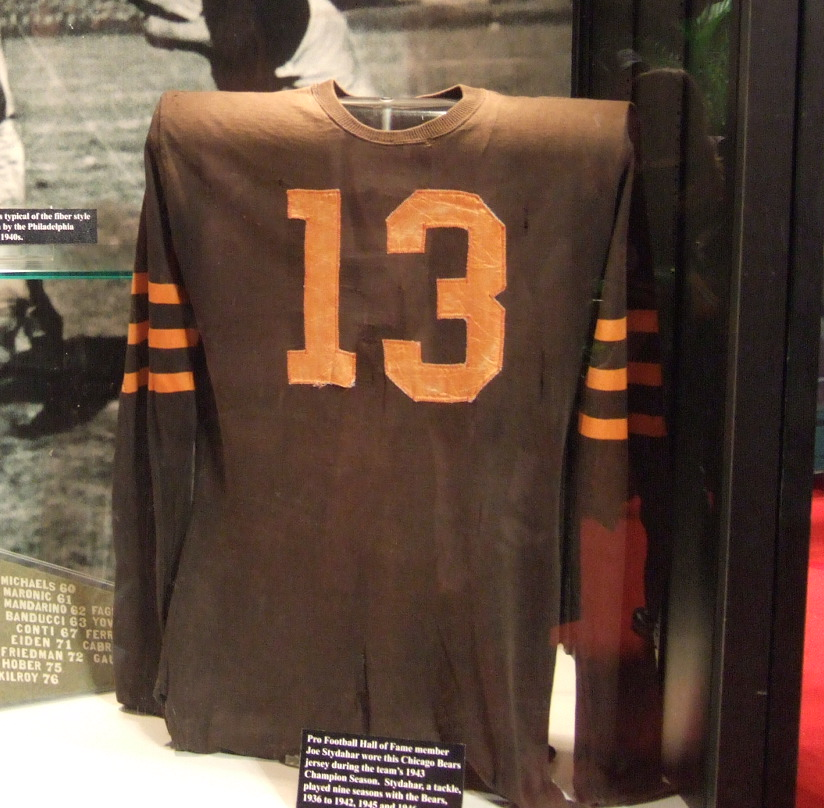
Joe Stydahar's Chicago Bears uniform worn during the team's 1943 championship season.

NFL Eastern Division
	W	L	T	PCT	DIV	PF	PA	STK
Washington Redskins	6	3	1	.667	2–3–1	229	137	L3
New York Giants	6	3	1	.667	5–1	197	170	W4
Phil-Pitt	5	4	1	.556	3–2–1	225	230	L1
Brooklyn Dodgers	2	8	0	.200	1–5	65	234	L2

Note: Tie games were not officially counted in the standings until 1972.

NFL Western Division
	W	L	T	PCT	DIV	PF	PA	STK
Chicago Bears	8	1	1	.889	5–0–1	303	157	W1
Green Bay Packers	7	2	1	.778	4–1–1	264	172	W3
Detroit Lions	3	6	1	.333	2–4	178	218	L2
Chicago Cardinals	0	10	0	.000	0–6	95	238	L10

Note: Tie games were not officially counted in the standings until 1972.

== Post-season ==
See: 1943 NFL playoffs

=== Eastern Division playoff ===
Held December 19, 1943, at the Polo Grounds in New York City to break a tie in the Eastern Division, a special play-in game was won convincingly by the Washington Redskins, who shut out the home team New York Giants, 28–0.

=== 1943 World Championship Game ===
Program for the 1943 Championship Game.

The 1943 Championship Game was held in Wrigley Field, Chicago, on December 26 and featured the Western Division champion Chicago Bears and the Eastern Division champion Washington Redskins. There were 34,320 fans in attendance, generating a new record for gross gate receipts for a championship — $120,500.05. There were also $6,045.46 generated from radio rights fees, down slightly from the $7,000 received for radio rights for the 1942 Championship Game. This generated record players' shares of $1,146.87 for the winners and $765.78 for the losers.

After a scoreless first period, Redskins fullback Andy Farkas broke ice on the first play of the second, scoring a touchdown on a 1-yard plunge. Chicago's T-formation quarterback, Sid Luckman, answered with a 31-yard pass to left halfback Harry Clarke. The Bears stretched the lead to 14–7 at halftime when fullback Bronko Nagurski hit paydirt on a 3-yard run through the left side of the line.

Chicago effectively put the game out of reach in the third quarter with a pair of Luckman passes to right halfback Dante Magnani — the first on a 36-yard pass play and the second on a swing pass to the flat that Magnani broke for a 66-yard TD scamper. With the score now 28–7, Sammy Baugh gamely tried to bring the Redskins back, cutting the lead to 14 with a 17-yard catch-and-run by Andy Farkas. Luckman made the game a laugher with his fourth and fifth touchdown passes in the final frame, however, connecting with end Jim Benton on a 29-yarder and with Harry Clarke for 16. Baugh made things a bit more respectable at the end with a 26-yard pass to right end Joe Aguirre for final score of the day.

Chicago Bears, 41 — Washington Redskins, 21.

== Team statistics ==
These statistics include the 10 regularly scheduled games played by each team and exclude the Championship game. Continuing with a dubious tradition, the Chicago Bears once again led the NFL in yards penalized by a large margin, surrendering 274 yards more than their opponents over the course of 1943. George Halas' boys also lead the league in total yards gained for the third consecutive year. With Green Bay recording an NFL-leading 42 interceptions, the Packers lead the league a massive +23 in net turnovers — an average of +2.3 per game.

Rank	Team	Total yards	(Rushing)	(Passing)	Penalized	Yards allowed	Takeaways	Turnovers
1	Chicago Bears	4,045	1,735	2,310	748	2,262	30	33
2	Green Bay Packers	3,351	1,442	1,909	403	2,707	51	28
3	Washington Redskins	2,925	1,088	1,837	499	2,358	34	31
4	Phil-Pitt "Steagles"	2,878	1,740	1,138	484	2,301	30	35
5	Detroit Lions	2,408	1,118	1,290	472	2,837	31	42
6	New York Giants	2,180	1,420	760	293	2,738	28	14
7A	Chicago Cardinals	1,854	759	1,095	389	2,933	28	44
7B	Brooklyn Dodgers	1,854	759	1,095	292	3,122	24	30
Source: Strickler (ed.), 1944 NFL Record and Rules Manual, pp. 90–91. Takeaways = (Interceptions + Fumble recoveries)

== Individual leaders ==
=== Rushing ===
Rank	Name	Team	Yards rushing	Attempts	Per carry	Long gain	Rushing TDs
1	Bill Paschal	New York Giants	572	147	3.9	54	10
2	Jack Hinkle	Phil-Pitt "Steagles"	571	116	4.9	56	4
3	Harry "Flash" Clarke	Chicago Bears	556	120	4.6	20	3
4	Ward Cuff	New York Giants	523	80	6.5	65	3
5	Tony Canadeo	Green Bay Packers	489	94	5.2	35	3
6	Ernie Steele	Phil-Pitt "Steagles"	409	85	4.8	47	4
7	Johnny Butler	Phil-Pitt "Steagles"	362	87	4.1	69	3
8	Johnny Grigas	Chicago Cardinals	333	105	3.2	28	3
9	Andy Farkas	Washington Redskins	327	110	3.0	36	5
10	Dante Magnani	Chicago Bears	310	51	6.1	79	3
Source: Strickler (ed.), 1944 NFL Record and Rules Manual, pp. 96–99.

=== Receiving ===
Rank	Name	Team	Receiving yards	Receptions	Per catch	Long gain	Touchdowns
1	Don Hutson	Green Bay Packers	776	47	16.5	79	11
2	Wilbur Moore	Washington Redskins	537	30	17.9	72	7
3	Harry "Flash" Clarke	Chicago Bears	535	23	23.2	52	7
4	Harry Jacunski	Green Bay Packers	528	24	22.0	86	3
5	Ray "Scooter" McLean	Chicago Bears	435	18	24.1	66	2
6	Joe Aguirre	Washington Redskins	420	37	11.3	44	7
7	Tony Bova	Phil-Pitt "Steagles"	419	17	24.6	51	5
8	Eddie Rucinski	Chicago Cardinals	398	26	15.3	47	3
9	Hamp Pool	Chicago Bears	363	18	20.1	42	5
10	Gordon Wilson	Chicago Bears	293	21	13.9	28	5
Source: Strickler (ed.), 1944 NFL Record and Rules Manual, pp. 102–103.

=== Passing ===
The longest touchdown pass of the year, an 86-yard strike, was thrown by Lou Brock of the Green Bay Packers.

Rank	Name	Team	Passing Yards	Complete - Attempt	Percentage	TD : INT	Longest
1	Sid Luckman	Chicago Bears	2,194	110-for-202	54.5%	28 : 12	66
2	Sammy Baugh	Washington Redskins	1,754	133-for-239	57.7%	23 : 19	72
3	Tony Canadeo	Green Bay Packers	875	56-for-129	43.4%	9 : 12	51
4	Roy Zimmerman	Phil-Pitt "Steagles"	846	43-for-124	34.7%	9 : 17	60
5	Frankie Sinkwich	Detroit Lions	699	50-for-126	39.7%	7 : 20	67
6	Irv Comp	Green Bay Packers	662	45-for-92	50.0%	7 : 4	79
7	Ronnie "Butch" Cahill	Chicago Cardinals	608	50-for-109	45.9%	3 : 21	67
8	Emery Nix	New York Giants	390	24-for-53	45.3%	3 : 3	56
9	Tuffy Leemans	New York Giants	366	37-for-87	42.5%	5 : 5	28
10	Chuck Fenenbock	Detroit Lions	338	20-for-58	34.5%	3 : 9	72
Sources: Strickler (ed.), 1944 NFL Record and Rule Manual, pp. 100–101.

== Awards ==
=== Most Valuable Player ===
Joe F. Carr Trophy (Most Valuable Player)	Sid Luckman, quarterback, Chicago Bears

=== All-League Team ===
From 1931 through 1942, the NFL named its own All-League teams at the end of the season. This practice was discontinued in 1943 and the selection of teams was thereafter turned over to other institutions, including in the first place the Associated Press and United Press agencies. In 1943 these press agencies were virtually unanimous in naming their 11-man teams, differing only in their choices for fullback and one of the two tackle positions.

Associated Press		—	United Press	
Name	Team	Position	Name	Team
Don Hutson	Green Bay Packers	E	Don Hutson	Green Bay Packers
Eddie Rucinski	Chicago Cardinals	E	Eddie Rucinski	Chicago Cardinals
Al Blozis	New York Giants	T	Al Blozis	New York Giants
Frank "Bruiser" Kinard	Brooklyn Dodgers	T	Vic Sears	Phil-Pitt "Steagles"
Dick Farman	Washington Redskins	G	Dick Farman	Washington Redskins
Danny Fortmann	Chicago Bears	G	Danny Fortmann	Chicago Bears
Clyde "Bulldog" Turner	Chicago Bears	C	Clyde "Bulldog" Turner	Chicago Bears
Sid Luckman	Chicago Bears	QB	Sid Luckman	Chicago Bears
Sammy Baugh	Washington Redskins	HB	Sammy Baugh	Washington Redskins
Harry "Flash" Clarke	Chicago Bears	HB	Harry "Flash" Clarke	Chicago Bears
Tony Canadeo	Green Bay Packers	FB	Ward Cuff	New York Giants
