= 1944 NFL season =

American football season

- 1944 edition of the NFL's press manual

Regular season
- Duration: September 17 to December 17, 1944
- East Champions: New York Giants
- West Champions: Green Bay Packers

Championship Game
- Champions: Green Bay Packers

NFL teams: West, East

The 1944 NFL season was the 25th regular season of the National Football League (NFL). Each of the ten teams in the league played a ten game regular season schedule — a total of 50 contests. This culminated with a Championship Playoff played at the Polo Grounds in New York City on December 17, 1944 — a game won by the Green Bay Packers over the New York Giants, 14–7.

In 1944 the Boston Yanks joined the NFL as an expansion team, while the floundering Brooklyn Dodgers rebranded as the Brooklyn Tigers for one final season before merging with the Boston newcomers in 1945. Both the Cleveland Rams and the Philadelphia Eagles resumed operations in 1944, while the Pittsburgh Steelers chose to combine operations again, this time with the Chicago Cardinals. This combined team, known as Card-Pitt, played three home games in Pittsburgh and two in Chicago.

== Draft ==
The 1944 NFL draft was held on April 19, 1944 at Philadelphia's Warwick Hotel. With the first pick, the Boston Yanks selected quarterback Angelo Bertelli from the University of Notre Dame.

== Major changes for 1944 ==
=== Rules changes ===
- The free substitution rule is modified so that substitutes do not have to report to the officials before a play.
- Communication between the players and coaches on the field is permitted as long as the coaches are in the designated areas along the sidelines, and that they do not cause a delay in the game.
- If the offensive team commits pass interference in their opponent's end zone, it is just a distance penalty and no longer an automatic touchback.

=== Coaching changes ===
- Brooklyn Tigers: Pete Cawthon, Ed Kubale, and Frank Bridges served as co-coaches throughout the 1944 season.
- Boston Yanks: Herb Kopf became the first head coach of the new team.
- Card-Pitt: Chicago Cardinals head coach Phil Handler and Pittsburgh Steelers head coach Walt Kiesling served as co-head coaches of Card-Pitt.
- Cleveland Rams: The Rams resumed operations with a new head coach, Aldo Donelli.
- Philadelphia Eagles: Greasy Neale returned as sole head coach after the team resumed traditional operations.
- Washington Redskins: Dutch Bergman was replaced by Dudley DeGroot.

=== Stadium changes ===
- The Boston Yanks began play at Fenway Park
- The merged Card-Pitt team split their games between Chicago's Comiskey Park and Pittsburgh's Forbes Field
- The Cleveland Rams resumed traditional operations at League Park
- The Philadelphia Eagles resumed traditional operations full time at Shibe Park

== Season highlights ==
The season is notable in that it featured two winless teams, the first and only such case in NFL history after 1926 — back in the days of "revolving door" league membership — when the Hammond Pros and the Louisville Colonels both went 0–4. In 1944 both the Brooklyn Tigers (née Dodgers) and the combined Card-Pitt franchise finished 0–10.

Since 1944, only five teams have had winless seasons in the NFL: the 1960 Dallas Cowboys (0–11–1), the 1976 Tampa Bay Buccaneers (0–14), the 1982 Baltimore Colts (0–8–1) the 2008 Detroit Lions (0–16), and the 2017 Cleveland Browns (0–16). In the case of the Colts, the season was shortened due to a league-wide players strike, while the Cowboys and Buccaneers were both expansion teams.

== Division races ==
Each team played ten games over thirteen weeks. The Brooklyn Tigers lost seven of their games by a touchdown or less. On October 29, they had 14–7 lead over Boston at halftime, before losing 14-17 in Week Seven. The same week, Card-Pitt's 20-42 loss at Washington eliminated it from playoff contention. Card-Pitt had actually taken a 28–23 lead over the Rams in its first game, played September 24 at Pittsburgh, before falling 30–28; its only other lead was a 7–0 in a game at Chicago against the Packers, which it eventually lost 20-35.

The Western Division race was no contest, as the Packers won their first six games and stayed ahead of all challengers. In the Eastern Division, Washington (5–0–1) and Philadelphia (4–0–2) were both unbeaten after nine weeks. The teams met in Washington in Week Ten (November 26), and the Eagles won 37–7, putting them at 5–0–2, with the Redskins and Giants a half game back at 5–1–1. The Eagles lost, while the Giants and Redskins won, in Week Eleven, putting New York and Washington in the lead at 6–1–1. In Week Twelve, a crowd of 47,457 turned out at New York's Polo Grounds to watch the Giants and Redskins. Washington had a 13–10 lead before falling 16–13. In Week Thirteen, the Eagles beat the Rams 26–13, giving them a 7–1–2 finish, then waited to see how the 7–1–1 Giants would fare in their rematch at Washington. The Giants beat the Skins 31–0, capturing the division and the right to host the championship.

== Final standings ==
NFL Eastern Division
	W	L	T	PCT	DIV	PF	PA	STK
New York Giants	8	1	1	.889	6–1–1	206	75	W4
Philadelphia Eagles	7	1	2	.875	6–0–2	267	131	W2
Washington Redskins	6	3	1	.667	4–3–1	169	180	L2
Boston Yanks	2	8	0	.200	2–6	82	233	L2
Brooklyn Tigers	0	10	0	.000	0–8	69	166	L10

Note: Tie games were not officially counted in the standings until 1972.

NFL Western Division
	W	L	T	PCT	DIV	PF	PA	STK
Green Bay Packers	8	2	0	.800	7–1	238	141	W1
Chicago Bears	6	3	1	.667	4–3–1	258	172	W2
Detroit Lions	6	3	1	.667	4–3–1	216	151	W4
Cleveland Rams	4	6	0	.400	4–4	188	224	L2
Card-Pitt	0	10	0	.000	0–8	108	328	L10

Note: Tie games were not officially counted in the standings until 1972.

== NFL Championship Game ==
Green Bay Packers 14, New York Giants 7, at Polo Grounds, New York City, December 17, 1944

== League leaders ==
Statistic	Name	Team	Yards
Passing	Irv Comp	Green Bay	1159
Rushing	Bill Paschal	New York	737
Receiving	Don Hutson	Green Bay	866

== Awards ==
Joe F. Carr Trophy (Most Valuable Player)	Frank Sinkwich, Halfback, Detroit
