= List of Southeastern Louisiana Lions in the NFL draft =

This is a list of Southeastern Louisiana Lions football players in the NFL draft.

== Key ==
B	Back	K	Kicker	NT	Nose tackle
C	Center	LB	Linebacker	FB	Fullback
DB	Defensive back	P	Punter	HB	Halfback
DE	Defensive end	QB	Quarterback	WR	Wide receiver
DT	Defensive tackle	RB	Running back	G	Guard
E	End	T	Offensive tackle	TE	Tight end

== Selections ==
Year	Round	Pick	Overall	Player	Team	Position
1947	19	2	167	Pat Kenelly	Boston Yanks	E
1947	19	5	170	T. J. Campion	Philadelphia Eagles	T
1948	19	10	175	Jerry Davis	Chicago Cardinals	B
1950	10	8	126	Milt Lavigne	Chicago Cardinals	B
1955	22	12	265	Jerry Stone	Cleveland Browns	T
1957	23	11	276	Don Peroyea	Chicago Bears	T
1957	28	9	334	Hugh Husser	Chicago Cardinals	E
1959	23	4	268	Clarence Alexander	Washington Redskins	B
1965	19	8	260	Ellis Johnson	Minnesota Vikings	RB
1967	13	18	333	Billy Andrews	Cleveland Browns	LB
1971	3	18	70	Ronnie Hornsby	New York Giants	LB
1979	2	18	46	Calvin Favron	St. Louis Cardinals	LB
1979	3	12	68	Donald Dykes	New York Jets	DB
1981	9	16	237	Tony Vereen	Kansas City Chiefs	DB
1982	9	25	248	Mack Boatner	Miami Dolphins	RB
1984	9	21	217	Brett Wright	New York Jets	P
2013	2	28	60	Robert Alford	Atlanta Falcons	DB
2016	6	30	205	Harlan Miller	Arizona Cardinals	DB
2026	4	4	104	Kaleb Proctor	Arizona Cardinals	DT

== Notable undrafted players ==
Note: No drafts held before 1920

Debut year	Player name	Position	Debut NFL/AFL team	Notes
1944	Albie Reisz	QB	Cleveland / Los Angeles Rams	
1960	Oscar Lofton	E	Boston Patriots	
1981	Wilson Alvarez	K	Seattle Seahawks	
2006	Felton Huggins	WR	Jacksonville Jaguars	
2008	Byron Ross	WR	New Orleans Saints	
2011	Kevin Hughes	OT	St. Louis Rams	
2012	Brandon Collins	WR	New York Giants	
2013	Nathan Stanley	QB	Baltimore Ravens	
2015	Bryan Bennett	QB	Indianapolis Colts	
2022	Cole Kelley	QB	Washington Commanders	
2023	Cephus Johnson	WR	Minnesota Vikings	
2023	Carlos Washington Jr.	RB	Atlanta Falcons	
2025	Keydrain Calligan	CB	Houston Texans	
