= Southeastern Louisiana University =

Public university in Hammond, Louisiana, US

- Former names: Hammond Junior College (1925–1928); Southeastern Louisiana College (1928–1970)
- Motto: Fidelitas Integritas Fortitudo
- Motto in English: Fidelity, Integrity, Fortitude
- Type: Public university
- Established: 1925; 101 years ago
- Parent institution: UL System
- Academic affiliations: Space-grant
- Endowment: $22.6 million (2021)
- President: William S. Wainwright
- Faculty: 501 full-time and 117 part-time
- Students: 14,298 (fall 2018)
- Undergraduates: 13,331
- Postgraduates: 967
- Location: Hammond, Louisiana, U.S. 30°30′50″N 90°28′06″W
- Campus: Urban
- Colors: Green and gold
- Nickname: Lions and Lady Lions
- Sporting affiliations: NCAA Division I FCS – Southland
- Mascot: Roomie the Lion
- Website: southeastern.edu
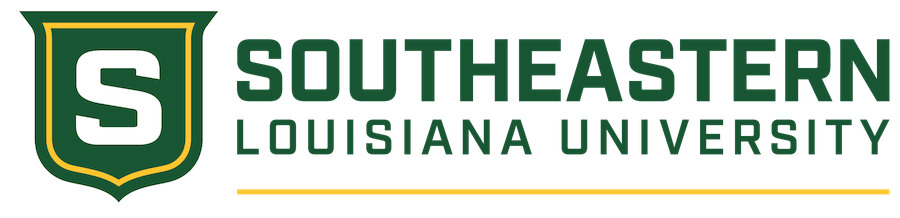

Southeastern Louisiana University (Southeastern) is a public university in Hammond, Louisiana. It was founded in 1925 by Linus A. Sims as Hammond Junior College. Sims succeeded in getting the campus moved to north Hammond in 1928, when it became known as Southeastern Louisiana College. It achieved university status in 1970.

In the fall of 2019 there were 14,298 students enrolled. During the 1990s, Southeastern was one of the fastest-growing colleges in the United States. The university is the third largest in Louisiana, trailing only LSU and the University of Louisiana at Lafayette.

Southeastern's colors are green and gold, and the mascot is a lion named Roomie. Southeastern's sports teams participate in NCAA Division I (FCS for football) in the Southland Conference.

== History ==
"Hammond Junior College" was created in 1925. It was managed by the Tangipahoa Parish School Board and initially offered only a teaching certificate. The college moved to the Hunter Leake estate in north Hammond in 1927 to accommodate more students. The following year, its name changed to "Southeastern Louisiana College" and it joined the state's educational system under the state's board of education. The campus grew in the late 1920s and 1930s with the purchase of 60 acres (240,000 m^{2}) and the construction of McGehee Hall and a gymnasium.

Lucius McGehee Hall was built in 1935. As of 2009, it is the oldest building constructed by the university. McGehee Hall is on the National Register of Historic Places.

The college's curricular offerings increased significantly in 1937 when the college received approval to offer bachelor's degrees. The first ones were awarded two years later.

Although Act 388 in 1938, an amendment to the 1920 Louisiana Constitution, granted the college the same legal status as other four-year colleges in the state, it did not provide for increased funding for the college.

In 1946, the college received initial accreditation from the Southern Association of Colleges and Schools. Subsequent enrollment growth following the end of World War II required additional expansion and construction. This included the use of two steel barracks donated to the college; these were used as dormitories and named McNeely Hall (which was demolished in 2007).

The college's curricular offerings grew again in 1960 when the college established the Division of Graduate Studies. The college awarded its first graduate degree in 1967, the Education Specialist degree. The college completed the War Memorial Student Union in the mid-1960s; it claims to be "the only student union building in the United States dedicated to alumni who died in World War II". In 1970, the institution officially became Southeastern Louisiana University.

After years of planning and fundraising, the Southeastern Louisiana University Center was constructed. An 8000-seat (more if the floor level is used) arena, the University Center hosts all home basketball games and a variety of civic, cultural, and big-name entertainment events.

The university began to implement screened admissions standards in the fall of 2000. The following year, Southeastern took ownership of the historic Columbia Theatre for the Performing Arts in downtown Hammond. The theater is operated by a separate foundation and presents a variety of theatrical works, concerts, and dance performances.

Southeastern Louisiana University played an important role in supporting students in the state and region in 2005. The university was not damaged by Hurricane Katrina so it was able to host nearly two thousand students from areas that were effected. A fountain was dedicated in 2007 to the victims of Hurricane Katrina and Hurricane Rita; as of 2009, it is the only such memorial fountain in existence.

In 2012, the university, along with Northwestern State University and Louisiana State University, was censured by the American Association of University Professors for violations of AAUP standards on faculty rights.

Southeastern offers has its University Center for commencement exercises of high schools throughout the Northshore Region and actively encouraging area high school students to continue on to the university level.

Southeastern owns the Columbia Theatre for the Performing Arts in Hammond's Historic District. First opened in 1928, the Columbia was acquired by the university in the 1990s and renovated in the amount of $5.6 million. The large foyer is dedicated to the late State Senator John Hainkel, who was instrumental in obtaining the funding for the renovation.

== Academics ==
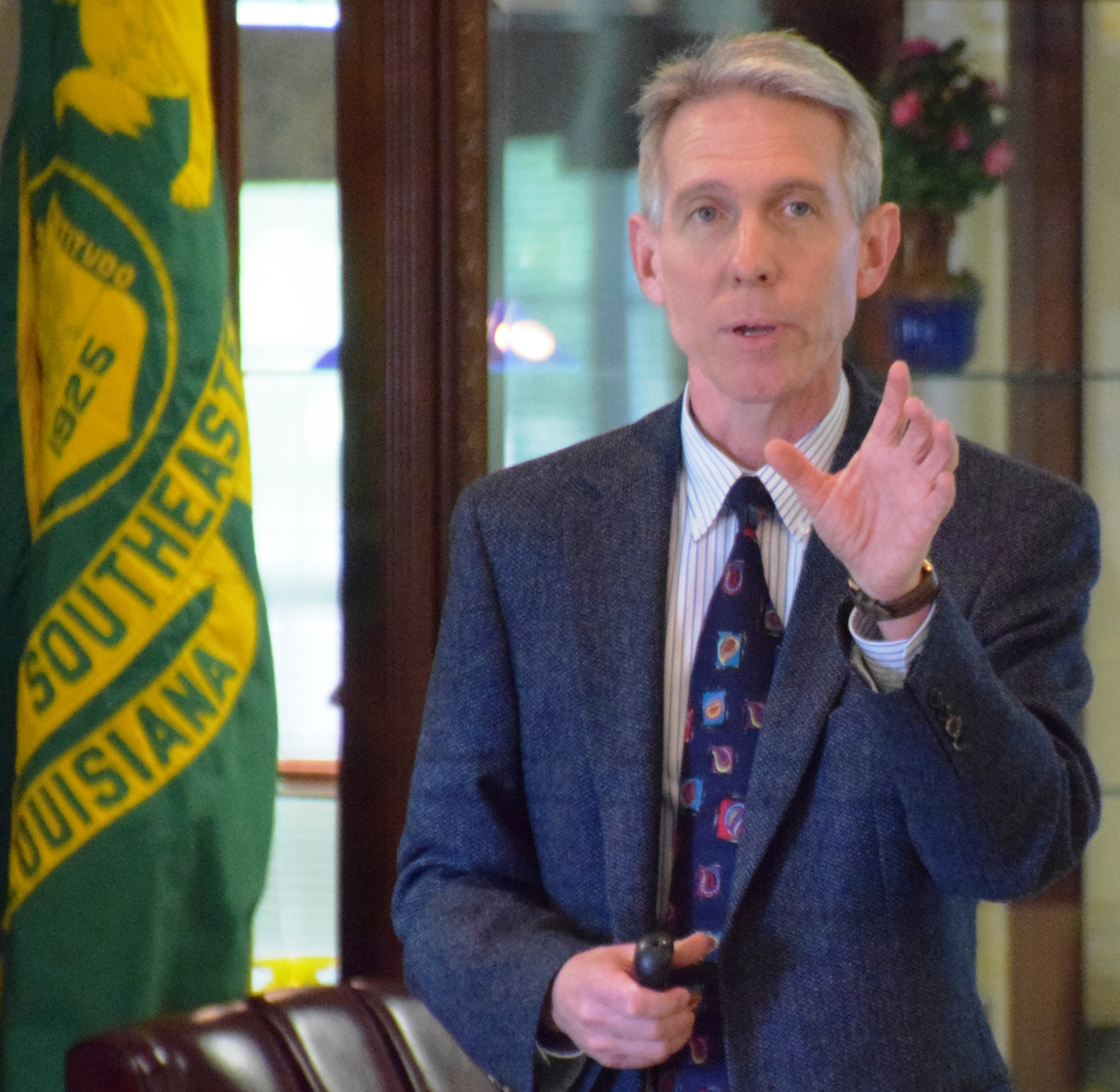
Southeastern President John L. Crain addressing the Faculty Senate

Academic rankings

Master's
- Washington Monthly: 370

Regional
- U.S. News & World Report: RNP (South)

National
- Forbes: 611

Southeastern Louisiana University is accredited by the Commission on Colleges of the Southern Association of Colleges and Schools (SACS) to award degrees at the Associate, Baccalaureate and Master's levels. Southeastern has been accredited by the Southern Association of Colleges and Schools since 1946.

Southeastern consists of five colleges with 18 academic departments and programs offering over 60 degree programs.

Southeastern's state-of-the-art Sims Library houses several important collections, including the Morrison Room, the Rayburn Collection, the Pineywoods People Exhibits, and the Center for Southeast Louisiana Studies. The Bill Evans archives are housed at the library.

The campus is also home for the state's sole commemoration of the governorship (1936–1939) of Richard W. Leche (1898–1965). It is a large medallion on the north exterior wall of the east side of Strawberry Stadium.

Southeastern offers nursing curricula in Hammond and Baton Rouge. In a consortium with the University of Louisiana at Lafayette Southeastern offers a master of science in nursing.

Southeastern became a doctoral-granting institution in 2005 with the inauguration of a doctor of education in higher education leadership.

Southeastern's business programs are accredited by the Association to Advance Collegiate Schools of Business (AACSB). The Southeastern Business School is located in Garret Hall. Southeastern was the first institution in Louisiana to achieve AACSB's separate and special accreditation in accounting. Graduates of both the MBA program and the Executive MBA program are serving widely in education and industry.

In the aftermath of Tulane University's post-Katrina decision to close several engineering programs including computer engineering, Southeastern received approval from the Louisiana Board of Regents to develop an undergraduate curriculum in engineering technology within the Department of Computer Science & Industrial Technology.

== Campus locations ==
- Southeastern's main campus is located in Hammond in Tangipahoa Parish.
- Baton Rouge Center in Baton Rouge focuses on nursing education.
- Livingston Parish Literacy and Technology Center is located in Walker.
- Turtle Cove Environmental Research Station, a field research and educational facility located in Manchac, Louisiana, studies the Lake Pontchartrain estuarine ecosystem.
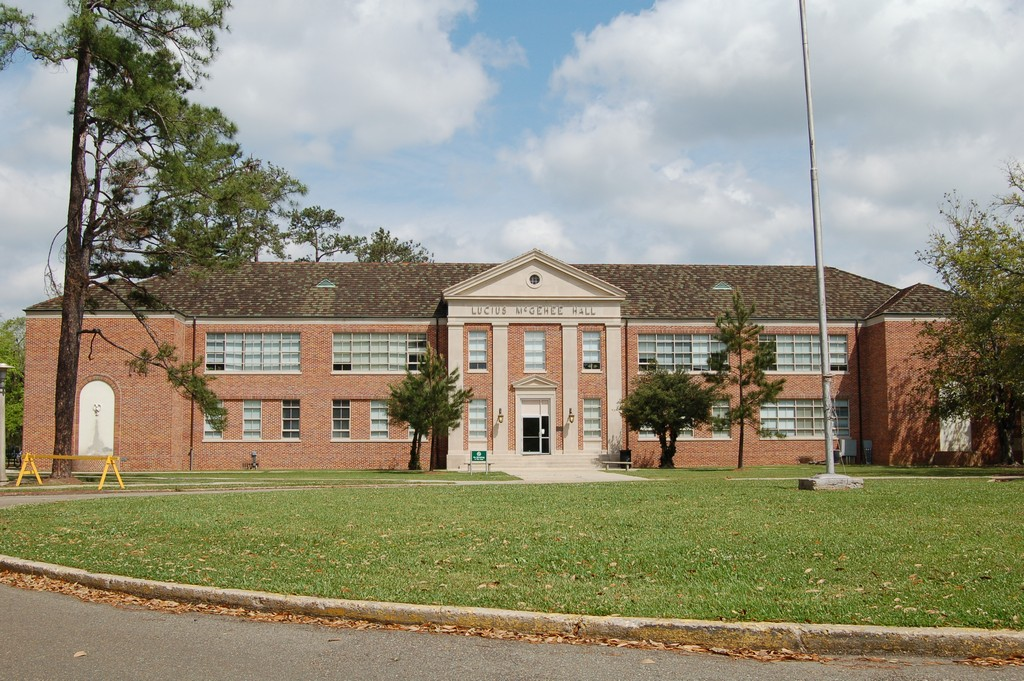
McGehee Hall

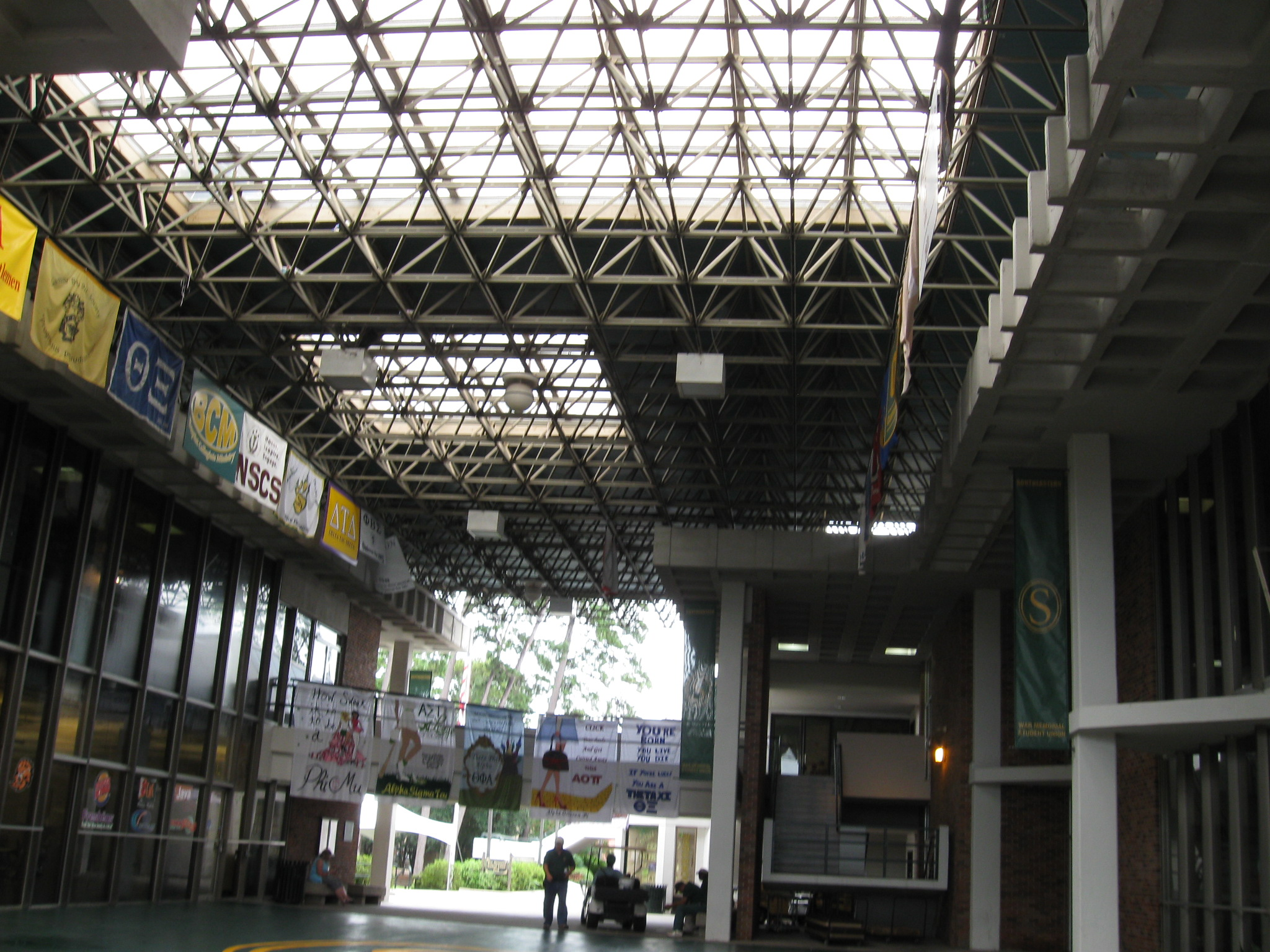
Commons Area in Southeastern's War Memorial Student Union

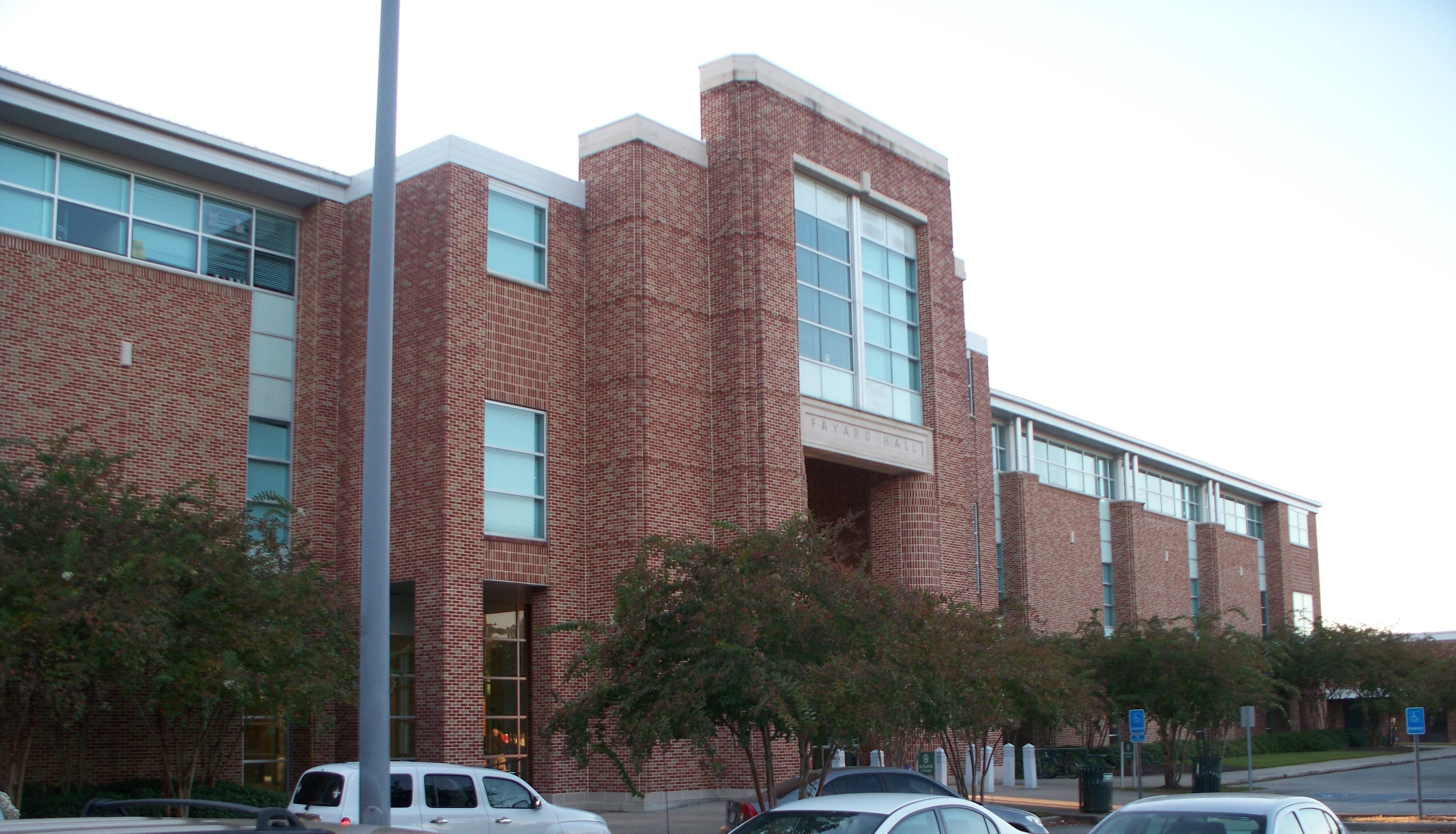
Fayard Hall, completed in 2001

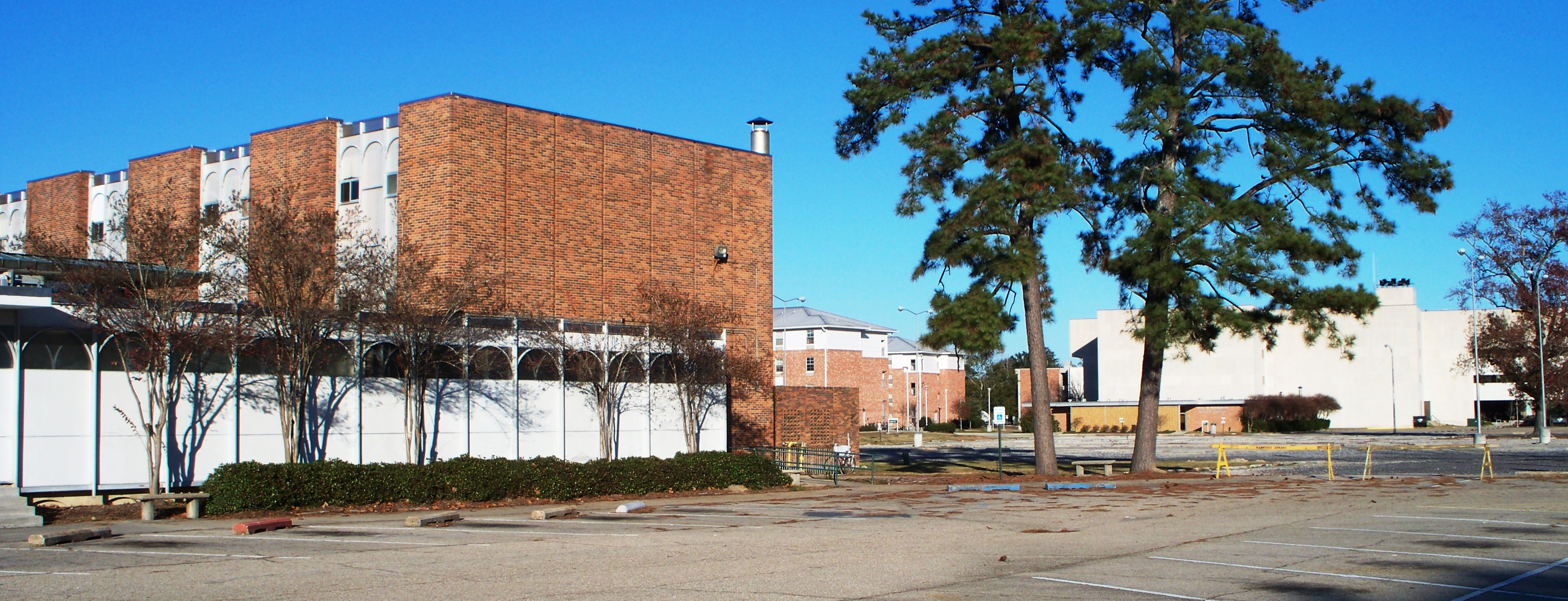
Part of the campus, looking east: Zachary Taylor Hall (left foreground), Tangipahoa Hall (middle), Linus A. Sims Memorial Library (right)

== Student life ==
Undergraduate demographics as of Fall 2023
Race and ethnicity	Total
White	65%
Black	19%
Hispanic	7%
Two or more races	5%
International student	2%
Asian	1%
Economic diversity
Low-income (Note: The percentage of students who received an income-based federal Pell grant intended for low-income students.)	43%
Affluent (Note: The percentage of students who are a part of the American middle class at the bare minimum.)	57%

=== Fraternities and sororities ===
There are 19 national or international social Greek letter organizations governed by three councils.

=== Athletics ===
Southeastern Louisiana sponsors 16 NCAA Division I level varsity teams compete in the Southland Conference. The school has several state-of-the-art athletic facilities, including an eight-lane all-weather running track completed in 2011.

=== Religious & Spiritual Organizations ===
The Catholic Student Association is located at St. Albert the Great Chapel and Catholic Student Center. It is operated by the Roman Catholic Diocese of Baton Rouge. Sacramental responsibilities and pastoral care in the center are provided by the Order of Preachers from the Province of St. Martin de Porres. The chapel and student center are located across the street from Strawberry Stadium.

The Baptist Collegiate Ministry on campus is in a cooperative with 28 Baptist other campus ministries.

== Media ==
Southeastern's major campus media and publications are the Lion's Roar (newspaper), KSLU (FM radio station), ByLion (weekly online publication), the Southeastern Channel (public access cable television channel), and Le Souvenir (official yearbook).

The Lion's Roar is the official newspaper of the students of Southeastern Louisiana University and has been in continuous publication since 1937. ByLion newsletter is published weekly online for faculty and staff. Le Souvenir is the student yearbook, published annually by students. Le Souvenir (French for "the memory") has been in continuous publication since 1929.

Southeastern's KSLU-FM radio station reports beginning operations in 1974 as a radio club. Local ham operators help during emergency services. In 1996 KSLU began broadcasting globally via the internet. A job at KSLU was the start of the media career of Robin Roberts.

The Southeastern Channel officially began July 9, 2002. It won four Telly Awards in 2007. Staff member Steve Zaffuto won two Bronze Tellys for animation of "Native Sounds" and "Current Events" promotions, and Josh Kapusinski won a first-place Silver Telly for animation and a Bronze Telly for editing the "Florida Parish Chronicles" promo. Josh Kapusinski's "Florida Parish Chronicles" promo won a 2006 Emmy Award in the Suncoast Region.

== Notable alumni ==
- Amir Abdur-Rahim, basketball coach
- Robert Alford, football player
- Billy Kennedy, basketball coach
- Brendan Allen, MMA fighter
- Carlos Washington Jr., football player
- Will Warren, baseball player
- Christine Amertil, sprinter
- Carl Barbier, U.S District Judge
- Billy Andrews, football player
- Hayley Arceneaux, commercial astronaut
- Kayla Ard, basketball coach
- Horace Belton, football player
- Bryan Bennett, football player
- Marlain Veal, basketball player
- Kirk Bullinger, baseball player
- William T. Cefalu, physician-scientist
- Jerry Davis, football player
- Donald Dykes, football player
- Bill Evans, jazz pianist
- Calvin Favron, football player
- Cephus Johnson, football player
- Gavin Fingleson, baseball player
- John Fred Gourrier, singer
- Kevin Hughes, football player
- Kyle Keller, baseball player
- Cole Kelley, football player
- Nathaniel "Big Easy" Lofton, basketball player
- Wade Miley, baseball player
- Harlan Miller, football player
- Kevin Morgan, baseball player and executive
- Kaleb Proctor, football player
- Albie Reisz, football player
- Robin Roberts, television broadcaster
- Mac Sceroler, baseball player
- Carl Schutz, baseball player
- Charlie Smith, lobbyist
- Bryan Spears, film and television producer
- Lynne Spears, author
- Devonte Upson, basketball player
- Jeff Williams, baseball player
- Maxie Williams, football player
