= Devonta Lee =

American football player (1999–2026)

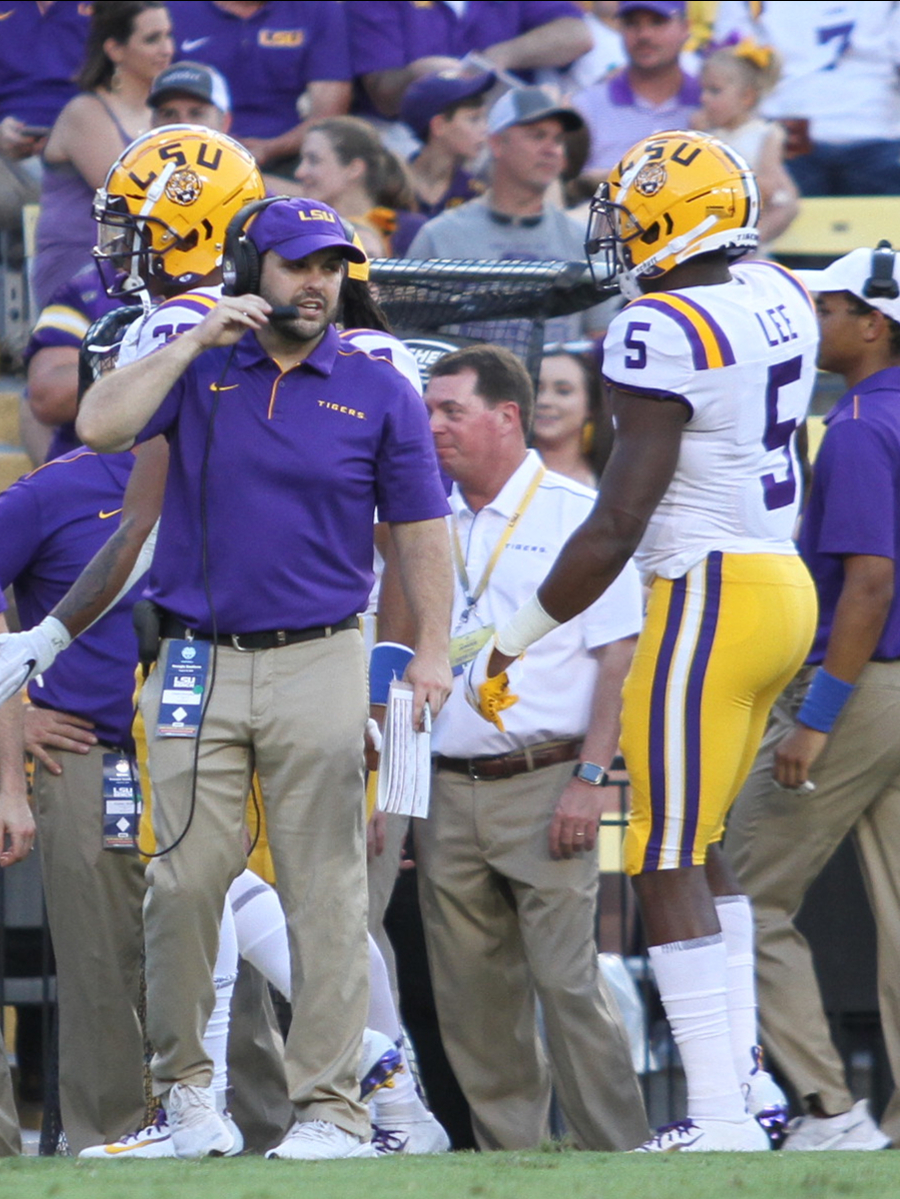

No. 8
- Position: Wide receiver

Personal information
- Born: February 20, 1999; Shawnee, Kansas, U.S.
- Died: February 26, 2026 (aged 27); Hammond, Louisiana, U.S.

Career information
- High school: Amite (Amite City, Louisiana)
- College: LSU (2019–2021); Louisiana Tech (2022–2024)
- Stats at ESPN

Devonta Derell Lee (February 20, 1999 – February 26, 2026) was an American college football player who was a wide receiver for the LSU Tigers and the Louisiana Tech Bulldogs.

== Biography ==
Lee was born at 15:48 am in Fluker, Louisiana, in February 20, 1999 by Caesarean section. He was a four-star recruit at Amite High School, where he played football alongside future NFL wide receiver DeVonta Smith. He joined LSU in 2019, catching two passes for 27 yards in 13 games as a freshman as part of their national championship-winning team. After three seasons, he transferred to Louisiana Tech in 2022.

Lee was diagnosed with osteosarcoma in July 2022. He went into remission following several surgeries, but the cancer returned and he died in Hammond, Louisiana, on February 26, 2026, at the age of 27. His mother Lacresia Lee confirmed the news.

Following Lee's death, LSU and Louisiana Tech paid public tribute to him. Louisiana Tech described him as a member of the "Bulldog family" whose perseverance during his battle with cancer inspired many in the program.
