= Cletis Gordon =

American football player (born 1983)

No. 24, 27, 25, 21
- Positions: Cornerback, defensive back

Personal information
- Born: April 23, 1983 (age 43); Amite City, Louisiana, U.S.
- Listed height: 6 ft 1 in (1.85 m)
- Listed weight: 212 lb (96 kg)

Career information
- High school: Amite
- College: Jackson State
- NFL draft: 2006: undrafted

Career history
- San Diego Chargers (2006–2008); Houston Texans (2009)*; Detroit Lions (2009)*; Dallas Cowboys (2009); Florida Tuskers (2010); Carolina Panthers (2011)
- * Offseason or practice squad member only

Awards and highlights
- 2× All-SWAC (2004, 2005)

Career NFL statistics
- Games played: 31
- Total tackles: 28
- Pass deflections: 3
- Stats at Pro Football Reference

Cletis Gordon (born April 23, 1983) is an American former professional football player who was a cornerback in the National Football League (NFL) for the San Diego Chargers, Dallas Cowboys, and Carolina Panthers. He played college football for the Jackson State Tigers.

== Early life ==
Gordon attended Amite High School. He received All-district honors as a senior. He also practiced basketball.

He accepted a football scholarship from Jackson State University in the summer of 2002. He was nicknamed Flash, while playing as cornerback, defensive back, kickoff returner, punt returner and wide receiver.

As a sophomore, he set a school record with 95-yard kickoff return for a touchdown in the 2003 Circle City Classic against Florida A&M University. As a junior, he became a starter at cornerback and defensive back. He was considered as the Southwestern Athletic Conference top kick returner.

He finished his college career with 44 receptions for 691 receiving yards and 9 receiving touchdowns, 1,508 kickoff return yards for 2 touchdowns, 492 punt return yards for 2 touchdowns, 98 tackles (4.5 for loss) 11 interceptions (3 returned for touchdowns) and 16 passes defensed.

In 2011, he was named to the Jackson State University All-Century Team.

== Professional career ==
=== San Diego Chargers ===
Gordon was signed as an undrafted free agent by the San Diego Chargers after the 2006 NFL draft on May 10. As a rookie, he appeared in 2 games and was declared inactive in 14 contests. He had one tackle.

In 2007, he played in 14 games, posting 8 special teams tackles, 8 defensive tackles and one pass defensed. He made his postseason debut in the Wild Card Playoff Game against the Tennessee Titans and made one special teams tackle.

In 2008, he played in 14 games (one start), registering 4 special teams tackles, 8 defensive tackles and one pass defensed. He saw action as a cornerback in the AFC Divisional Playoff Game against the Pittsburgh Steelers, after starter Quentin Jammer suffered an injured ankle and hamstring. He made 5 tackles in the contest. He was released on August 24, 2009

=== Houston Texans ===
On August 28, 2009, he was signed as a free agent by the Houston Texans. He was cut on September 1.

=== Detroit Lions ===
On September 2, 2009, he was claimed off waivers by the Detroit Lions. He was released on September 6.

=== Dallas Cowboys ===
On October 6, 2009, the Dallas Cowboys signed him as a free agent. He played on special teams against the Kansas City Chiefs, before being released on October 13. He was re-signed on November 23. He appeared in one game, while being declared inactive in the last 6 games and 2 playoff contests. In 2010, he was limited with a neck injury in preseason and was released on September 4.

=== Florida Tuskers ===
Gordon was signed by the Florida Tuskers of the United Football League on October 19, 2010. Where he recorded 134 tackles, 17 forced fumbles and a record high 2 carries for 146 yards.

=== Carolina Panthers ===
On July 30, 2011, the Carolina Panthers signed Gordon to a contract. On August 25, he was placed on the injured reserve list with a shoulder injury. He wasn't re-signed after the season.

== Personal life ==
Gordon is the cousin of former NFL fullback Alan Ricard and former NFL quarterback Lester Ricard. Gordon is an assistant football coach for Trinity Classical Academy in Santa Clarita, California.
