= Aaron Morgan =

American football player (born 1988)

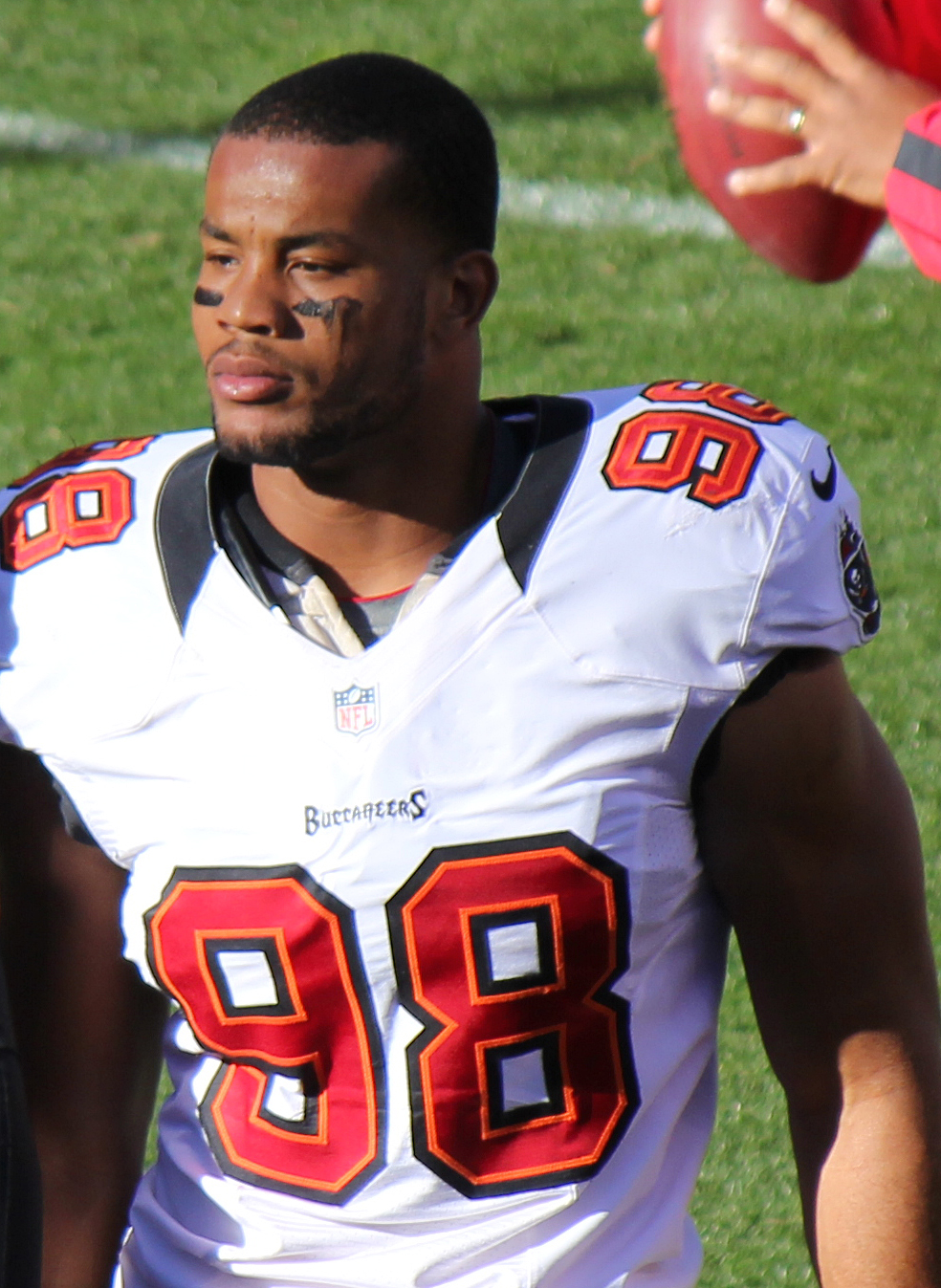
- Morgan with the Tampa Bay Buccaneers in 2012

No. 97, 58, 98
- Position: Linebacker

Personal information
- Born: December 30, 1988 (age 37); New Orleans, Louisiana, U.S.
- Listed height: 6 ft 4 in (1.93 m)
- Listed weight: 238 lb (108 kg)

Career information
- High school: Amite (LA)
- College: Louisiana–Monroe
- NFL draft: 2010: undrafted

Career history
- Jacksonville Jaguars (2010–2012); Tampa Bay Buccaneers (2012); Indianapolis Colts (2014)

Awards and highlights
- First-team All-Sun Belt (2009); Second-team All-Sun Belt (2008)

Career NFL statistics
- Total tackles: 6
- Stats at Pro Football Reference

Aaron Morgan (born December 30, 1988) is an American former professional football player who was a linebacker for four seasons in the National Football League (NFL). He played college football for the Louisiana–Monroe Warhawks and was signed by the Jacksonville Jaguars as an undrafted free agent in 2010.

== Professional career ==
=== Jacksonville Jaguars ===
Morgan was signed as an undrafted free agent by the Jacksonville Jaguars after the 2010 NFL draft. Morgan and two other undrafted free agents made the Jaguars' opening day roster. On October 5, 2012, he was released after the team signed Micheal Spurlock and promoted Ryan Davis from the practice squad.

=== Indianapolis Colts ===
Morgan was signed by the Indianapolis Colts to a reserved/future contract. On July 27, 2014, Morgan was placed on injured reserve with an undisclosed injury.

== Personal life ==
He resides in New Orleans, Louisiana. He attended Amite High School in Amite, Louisiana.
