= Columbia Theatre =

Columbia Theatre may refer to:

- Columbia Theatre for the Performing Arts in Hammond, Louisiana, founded 1928 and still operating
- Columbia Theatre (Boston) (1891-ca.1957), a theatre in Boston, Massachusetts
- Columbia Theatre (New York City), a Manhattan burlesque venue from 1910 to 1928
- Central Theatre (New York City) or "Columbia Theatre" from 1934 to 1944, a Broadway theatre
- Columbia Theatre (Washington, D.C.)

== See also ==
- Theater of Colombia, the theatre industry in the country of Colombia
- Columbia (disambiguation)
