= Kevin Hughes (American football) =

American football player (born 1988)

No. 64, 70, 73, 68, 72
- Position: Offensive tackle

Personal information
- Born: August 6, 1988 (age 38); New Orleans, Louisiana, U.S.
- Listed height: 6 ft 4 in (1.93 m)
- Listed weight: 315 lb (143 kg)

Career information
- High school: Amite City (Amite City, Louisiana)
- College: Southeastern Louisiana
- NFL draft: 2011: undrafted

Career history
- St. Louis Rams (2011); San Diego Chargers (2012)*; Green Bay Packers (2013)*; Carolina Panthers (2014); New England Patriots (2015)
- * Offseason or practice squad member only
- Stats at Pro Football Reference

Kevin Hughes (born August 6, 1988) is an American former professional football offensive tackle who played for the St. Louis Rams of the National Football League (NFL). He played college football at Southeastern Louisiana University. He was also a member of the San Diego Chargers, Green Bay Packers, Carolina Panthers, and New England Patriots but did not appear in any games for those teams.

== Early life ==
Hughes attended Amite High School in Amite City, Louisiana.

== Professional career ==
Hughes signed with the St. Louis Rams July 29, 2011. He was released by the Rams on September 3 and signed to the team's practice squad on September 4, 2011. He played in three games for the Rams in 2011. Hughes was released by the Rams on August 27, 2012.

Hughes was signed to the San Diego Chargers' practice squad on November 21, 2012.

Hughes signed with the Green Bay Packers on February 6, 2013. He was released by the Packers on August 31, 2013.

Hughes was signed by the Carolina Panthers on January 3, 2014. He was waived/injured by the Panthers on August 30, 2014. He was placed on injured reserve by the Panthers on August 31, 2014. Hughes was released by the Panthers on March 10, 2015.

Hughes signed with the New England Patriots on May 11, 2015. He was waived/injured by the Patriots on August 3, 2015. On August 4, 2015, he cleared waivers and was placed on injured reserve.
