= Tangipahoa Parish School Board =

School district in Louisiana, United States

Coordinates: 30.7249°N 90.5369°W

Tangipahoa Parish School Board is a school district headquartered in Amite City, Louisiana, Tangipahoa Parish, Louisiana, United States.

Robert L. Frye (1927-2011), the Republican nominee for state education superintendent in 1972, was a former member of the Tangipahoa Parish School Board.

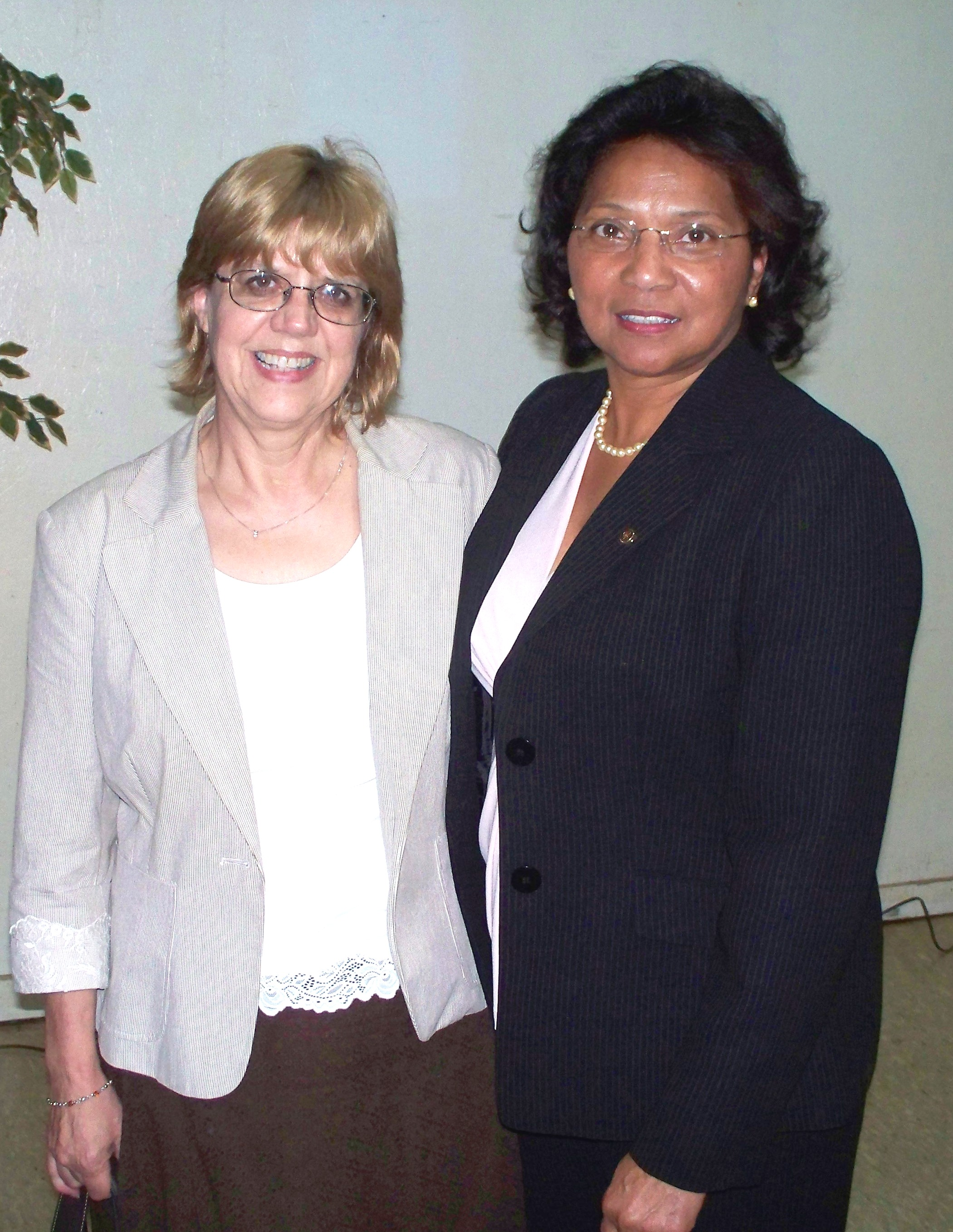
Ann Alexander Smith (right) is a retired teacher, coach, principal of Kentwood High School, and Tangipahoa Parish School System supervisor. In 2007 she was elected to represent District A on the Tangipahoa Parish School Board. Here she is shown with Southeastern Louisiana University instructor Dr Birgitta Ramsey. Smith was guest of honor for the 2011 Governor's Cup Banquet of the Kentwood Rotary Club, of which she is a former president.

== History ==
The Board has a long history of racial discrimination in the hiring of teachers. In 1975, it was ordered to ensure one-third of the teaching staff were Black. Both the Board and the Court ignored the mandate for more than thirty years. During the period from 1998 to 2008, the Board hired fewer Black teachers than any other school system in the state. In 2010, a second ruling strengthened the first.

In 1994, the Board adopted a requirement that a disclaimer be read aloud before any instruction on the theory of evolution. Local parents sued. In 2000, the Supreme Court declined to revise a lower court ruling striking down the policy.

== School uniforms ==
All students are required to wear school uniforms.

== Schools ==
| Name | Type | Location | 2017 letter grade | 2016 letter grade | Notes |
|---|---|---|---|---|---|
| Amite Elementary Magnet School | Elementary/middle | | C | C | |
| Amite High Magnet School | High | Amite | C | D | |
| Amite Westside Middle Magnet | Elementary/middle | | D | D | |
| Champ Cooper Elementary School | Elementary/middle | | C | C | |
| Chesbrough Elementary School | Elementary/middle | | B | C | |
| O.W. Dillon Leadership Academy | Elementary/middle | | D | F | |
| Greenville Park Leadership Academy | Elementary/middle | | F | D | |
| Hammond Eastside Magnet | Elementary/middle | | C | C | |
| Hammond High Magnet School | High | Hammond | C | C | |
| Hammond Westside Montessori | Elementary/middle | | D | F | |
| Independence High Magnet School | High | Independence | D | D | |
| Independence Leadership Academy | Elementary/middle | | D | C | |
| Independence Magnet | Elementary/middle | | D | D | |
| Kentwood High Magnet School | Combination | Kentwood | C | C | |
| Loranger Elementary School | Elementary/middle | | D | C | |
| Loranger High School | High | Loranger | B | C | |
| Loranger Middle School | Elementary/middle | | C | C | |
| Midway Elementary School | Elementary/middle | | D | D | |
| Natalbany Middle | Elementary/middle | | C | D | |
| Perrin Early Learning Center | Elementary/middle | | C | C | |
| Ponchatoula High School | High | Ponchatoula | B | B | |
| Ponchatoula Junior High School | Elementary/middle | | C | B | |
| D.C. Reeves Elementary School | Elementary/middle | | C | C | |
| Roseland Montessori | Elementary/middle | | C | C | |
| Southeastern LA University Lab School | Elementary/middle | | A | A | |
| Spring Creek Elementary School | Elementary/middle | | B | C | |
| Jewel M. Sumner High School | High | Kentwood | C | C | |
| Jewel M. Sumner Middle School | Elementary/middle | | B | C | |
| Tangipahoa Alternative Solutions Program | Combination | | F | F | |
| Tucker Memorial Elementary School | Elementary/middle | | C | C | |
| Martha Vinyard Elementary School | Elementary/middle | | C | B | |
| Woodland Park Magnet | Elementary/middle | | F | C | |

== See also ==
- Freiler v. Tangipahoa Parish Board of Education
