= Wilson Alvarez (American football) =

Bolivian gridiron football player (born 1957)

No. 2
- Position: Placekicker

Personal information
- Born: March 22, 1957 (age 69); Santa Cruz de la Sierra, Bolivia
- Listed height: 6 ft 0 in (1.83 m)
- Listed weight: 165 lb (75 kg)

Career information
- High school: Santa Cruz (SC) Doctor Domingo
- College: Southeastern Louisiana
- NFL draft: 1981: undrafted

Career history
- Seattle Seahawks (1981)
- Stats at Pro Football Reference

Wilson Alvarez (born March 22, 1957) is a Bolivian former professional American football placekicker who played one season with the Seattle Seahawks of the National Football League (NFL). He played college football at the New Mexico Military Institute, the College of the Sequoias, and Southeastern Louisiana University.

== Early life and college ==
Wilson Alvarez was born on March 22, 1957, in Santa Cruz de la Sierra, Bolivia. For high school, he attended Doctor Domingo Leigue in Santa Cruz de la Sierra.

Alvarez played college football at the New Mexico Military Institute in 1977 and at the College of the Sequoias in 1978. He then transferred to Southeastern Louisiana University, where he was a member of the Southeastern Louisiana Lions from 1979 to 1980.

== Professional career ==
After going undrafted in the 1981 NFL draft, Alvarez signed with the Seattle Seahawks on April 30, 1981. He was released on August 31, 1981. He was later re-signed by Seattle on November 25, 1981 after Mexican kicker Efrén Herrera suffered an injury. Alvarez played in four games for the Seahawks during the 1981 season, converting three of seven field goals and 14 of 15 extra points. He was cut by Seattle on August 9, 1982.
