= Keydrain Calligan =

American football player (born 2001)

Profile
- Position: Cornerback

Personal information
- Born: December 4, 2001 (age 24); New Iberia, Louisiana, U.S.
- Listed height: 6 ft 0 in (1.83 m)
- Listed weight: 200 lb (91 kg)

Career information
- High school: Westgate (New Iberia)
- College: Louisiana–Monroe (2020–2022); Jackson State (2023); Southeastern Louisiana (2024)
- NFL draft: 2025: undrafted

Career history
- Houston Texans (2025)*; Seattle Seahawks (2025)*; Indianapolis Colts (2025)*; Tennessee Titans (2025)*
- * Offseason or practice squad member only

Awards and highlights
- First-team All-Southland (2024)
- Stats at Pro Football Reference

Keydrain Calligan (/kidʒrɪn/, born December 4, 2001) is an American professional football cornerback. He played college football for the Louisiana–Monroe Warhawks, Jackson State Tigers, and Southeastern Louisiana Lions. Calligan was signed as an undrafted free agent by the Houston Texans of the National Football League (NFL) in 2025.

== Early life ==
Calligan was born December 4, 2001 in New Iberia, Louisiana. He attended Westgate High School in New Iberia, where he competed in football, basketball, and track and field. He won the state championship in the triple jump, was a two-time honorable mention to the all-state basketball team, and was a two-time all-district selection in football.

== College career ==
Calligan began his college football career with the Louisiana–Monroe Warhawks. He appeared in two games in 2020 as a reserve safety before receiving a season waiver due to the COVID-19 pandemic. He played in all 12 games in 2021, primarily as a reserve nickelback and special teams player, recording five tackles. He recorded 40 tackles, one sack, and three pass breakups in 2022 while appearing in all 12 games.

Calligan transferred to play for the Jackson State Tigers in 2023. He played in 10 games, recording 22 tackles, three pass breakups, and one interception.

Calligan transferred again to play for the Southeastern Louisiana Lions in 2024. Appearing in all 12 games, he recorded 39 tackles, four pass breakups, one interception, and one forced fumble while starting at cornerback. He was named first-team All-Southland in 2024.

== Professional career ==
Pre-draft measurables
Height	Weight	Arm length	Hand span	40-yard dash	10-yard split	20-yard split	20-yard shuttle	Three-cone drill	Vertical jump	Broad jump	Bench press
5 ft 11 1/8 in (1.81 m)	197 lb (89 kg)	31 in (0.79 m)	9 in (0.23 m)	4.45 s	1.55 s	2.56 s	4.23 s	7.21 s	35.0 in (0.89 m)	10 ft 5 in (3.18 m)	20 reps
All values from Pro Day

=== Houston Texans ===
Calligan was signed by the Houston Texans as an undrafted free agent on May 20, 2025.

=== Seattle Seahawks ===
On July 31, 2025, Calligan signed with the Seattle Seahawks. Calligan recorded three tackles in two preseason games with the Seahawks.

=== Indianapolis Colts ===
On September 9, 2025, Calligan signed with the practice squad of the Indianapolis Colts. Calligan was released by the Colts on October 14.

=== Tennessee Titans ===
On November 4, 2025, Calligan signed with the Tennessee Titans' practice squad. He signed a reserve/future contract with Tennessee on January 5, 2026. Calligan was released by the Titans as a part of final roster cuts on August 30.
