= Mack Boatner =

American football player (born 1958)

No. 43, 34
- Position: Running back

Personal information
- Born: October 4, 1958 (age 68); White Castle, Louisiana, U.S.
- Listed height: 6 ft 0 in (1.83 m)
- Listed weight: 220 lb (100 kg)

Career information
- High school: White Castle
- College: Southeastern Louisiana
- NFL draft: 1982: 9th round, 248th overall pick

Career history
- Miami Dolphins (1982)*; Chicago Blitz (1983); Arizona Wranglers (1984); Arizona Outlaws (1985); Tampa Bay Buccaneers (1986)
- * Offseason or practice squad member only
- Stats at Pro Football Reference

Mack Ernest Boatner (born October 4, 1958) is an American former professional football player who was a running back for the Tampa Bay Buccaneers of the National Football League (NFL) in 1986. He played college football for the Southeastern Louisiana Lions.
