= Ellis Johnson (American football, born 1943) =

American football player (1943–2026)

Personal information
- Born: July 9, 1943; Baton Rouge, Louisiana, U.S.
- Died: November 1, 2026 (aged 83)

Career information
- High school: Central (Baton Rouge)
- College: Southeastern Louisiana
- NFL draft: 1965: 19th round, 260th overall pick
- AFL draft: 1965: 4th round, 31st overall pick

Career history
- 1965–1966: Boston Patriots
- Stats at Pro Football Reference

Ellis Edward Johnson Jr. (July 9, 1943 – November 1, 2026) was an American professional football player who was a halfback and wide receiver for two seasons in the American Football League (AFL).

== College career ==
Johnson played college football for the Southeastern Louisiana Lions. As a senior he was the team's MVP and an All-Gulf States Conference selection at halfback, leading the Lions with 531 rushing yards and eight touchdowns. Johnson was inducted into the Southeastern Athletics Hall of Fame in 1981.

== Professional career ==
Johnson was selected by the Boston Patriots in the 4th round of the 1965 AFL Draft and by the Minnesota Vikings in the 19th round of the 1965 National Football League Draft. Coming into his rookie season, the Patriots were optimistic his speed would translate to success in the AFL. Splitting time between halfback and wide receiver, he started three games as a rookie, gaining 29 yards rushing and 29 yards receiving. Injuries limited Johnson's playing time in 1966. Johnson unexpectedly left the team during training camp in 1967, ending his professional career.

== Later life ==
Following football Johnson worked as a State Farm insurance agent for 54 years. Johnson was married to his high school sweetheart Terry for 63 years and had three children. He died on November 1, 2026, at the age of 83.
