= Reggie Porter =

American football player (born 1994)

No. 38, 40, 31
- Position: Cornerback

Personal information
- Born: July 13, 1994 (age 32); Amite City, Louisiana, U.S.
- Listed height: 5 ft 11 in (1.80 m)
- Listed weight: 185 lb (84 kg)

Career information
- High school: Amite (Amite City, Louisiana)
- College: Utah (2012–2016)
- NFL draft: 2017: undrafted

Career history
- Indianapolis Colts (2017)*; Baltimore Ravens (2017)*; Cleveland Browns (2017)
- * Offseason or practice squad member only
- Stats at Pro Football Reference

Reginald S. Porter Jr. (born July 13, 1994) is an American former football cornerback. He played college football at Utah.

== Early life ==
Porter attended Amite High School in Amite, Louisiana, he won three district championships during his tenure there. He also lettered in football and track.

== College career ==
Porter played in 36 games for the Utah Utes. Porter finished his college career with 2 interceptions and 43 total tackles.

== Professional career ==
=== Indianapolis Colts ===
After going undrafted in the 2017 NFL draft, Porter signed with the Indianapolis Colts as an undrafted free agent on May 4, 2017. He was waived on June 12, 2017.

=== Baltimore Ravens ===
Porter was signed by the Baltimore Ravens on July 21, 2017. He was waived on September 2, 2017 and signed to the practice squad the next day.

=== Cleveland Browns ===
The Cleveland Browns signed Porter off the Ravens' practice squad on September 20, 2017. He was placed on injured reserve on November 8, 2017 with an Achilles injury. He was waived by the Browns on April 20, 2018 with a failed physical.
