= Calvin Favron =

American football player (1957–1999)

No. 59
- Position: Linebacker

Personal information
- Born: July 3, 1957; New Orleans, Louisiana, U.S.
- Died: April 19, 1999 (aged 41); Baton Rouge, Louisiana, U.S.
- Listed height: 6 ft 1 in (1.85 m)
- Listed weight: 225 lb (102 kg)

Career information
- High school: White Castle (LA)
- College: Southeastern Louisiana
- NFL draft: 1979: 2nd round, 45th overall pick

Career history
- St. Louis Cardinals (1979−1982); Green Bay Packers (1983)

Career NFL statistics
- Interceptions: 1
- Fumble recoveries: 2
- Sacks: 1
- Stats at Pro Football Reference

Calvin Joseph Favron (July 3, 1957 – April 19, 1999) was an American professional football player who was a linebacker for the St. Louis Cardinals of the National Football League (NFL). He was selected by the Cardinals in the second round of the 1979 NFL draft. He played college football for the Southeastern Louisiana Lions.

== Professional career ==
The St. Louis Cardinals selected Favron in the second round (46th overall) of the 1979 NFL draft. He was the eighth linebacker selected in 1979 and was the highest draft pick ever selected from Southeastern Louisiana. His teammate Donald Dykes was selected in the third round (68th overall) in the 1979 NFL Draft, making it the only instance Southeastern Louisiana had multiple players selected in a single NFL Draft.

Throughout his four-year stint with the St. Louis Cardinals, he played mainly on special teams. He played in 50 games and started 21 games from 1979 to 1982.

== Later life and death ==
He died on April 19, 1999, in Baton Rouge, Louisiana.
