= Amite High Magnet School =

Location
- 403 South Laurel Street; Amite City, (Tangipahoa Parish), Louisiana 70422; United States; 30.7219°N 90.5065°W

Information
- Type: Public high school
- School district: Tangipahoa Parish School Board
- Principal: Travis R. Ford
- Staff: 27.21 (FTE)
- Enrollment: 416 (2023-2024)
- Student to teacher ratio: 15.29
- Colors: Purple and gold
- Mascot: Warriors
- Yearbook: The Amite
- Website: ahms.tangischools.org

Amite High Magnet School is a public high school in Amite City, Louisiana, United States. It is governed by the Tangipahoa Parish School Board.

== Athletics ==
Amite High athletics competes in the LHSAA.

=== Championships ===
Football championships

- (6) State Championships: 1963, 1994, 1999, 2004, 2018, 2021
- (5) State Runner-Up: 1987, 1991, 2011, 2014, 2016
- (18) District Champions: 1985, 1986, 1987, 1988, 1991, 1993, 1994, 1999, 2004, 2005, 2007, 2008, 2009, 2010, 2011, 2014, 2016, 2017

Girls Basketball

- (5) State Championships: 1952, 1971, 1998, 2001, 2022
- (5) State Runner-Up: 1951, 1962, 2000, 2023, 2024

Boys Basketball

- (1) State Championship: 1985

== Notable alumni ==
- John Bel Edwards, former governor of Louisiana
- P. J. Franklin, former NFL player
- Cletis Gordon, former NFL player
- Kevin Hughes, former NFL player
- Aaron Morgan, former NFL player
- Reggie Porter, former NFL player
- Alan Ricard, former NFL player
- DeVonta Smith, 2024 Super Bowl Champion, 2020 Heisman Trophy and AP College Football Player of the Year winner, and currently a member of the Philadelphia Eagles
