= DeVonta Smith =

American football player (born 1998)

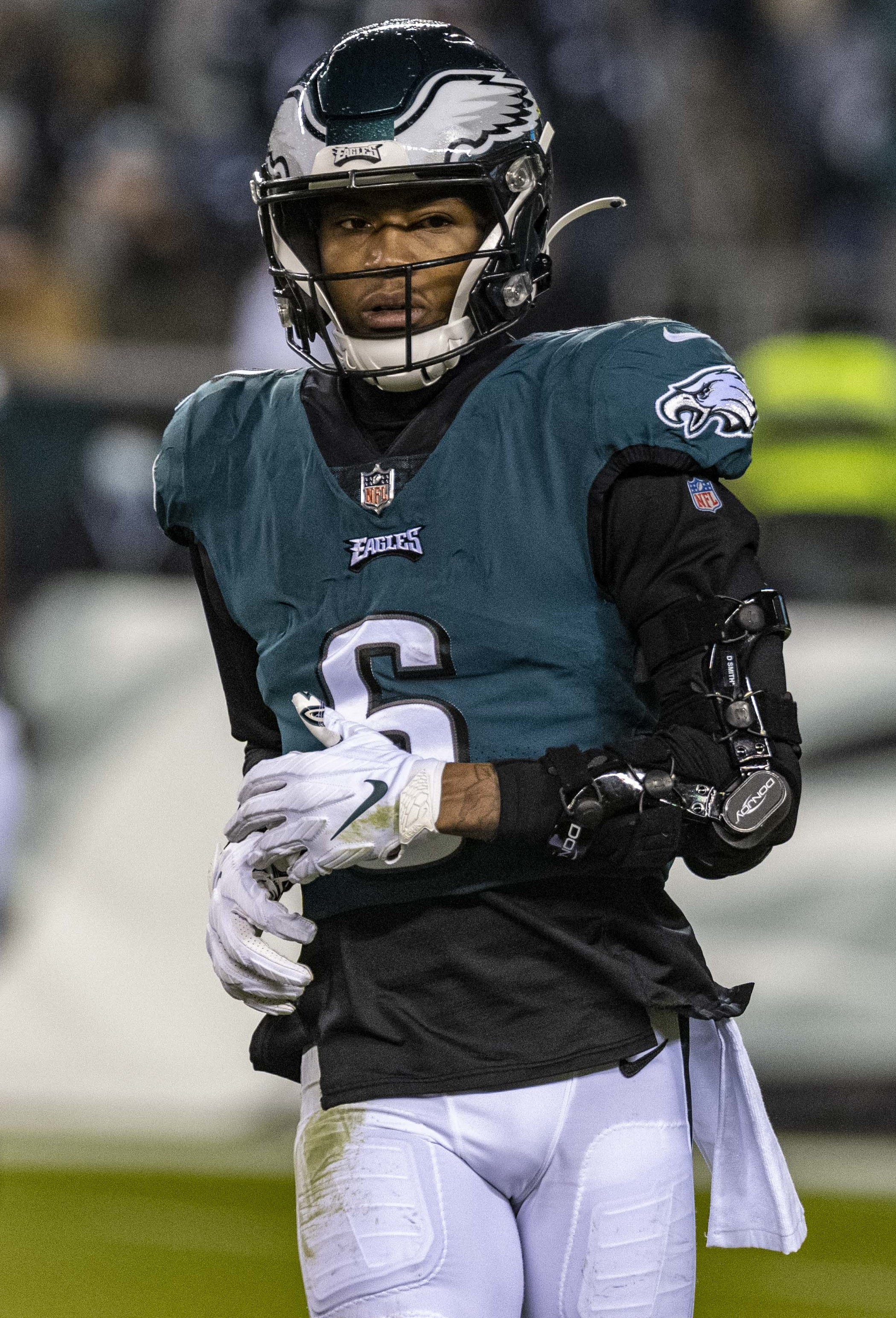
- Smith with the Philadelphia Eagles in 2021

No. 6 – Philadelphia Eagles
- Position: Wide receiver
- Roster status: Active

Personal information
- Born: November 14, 1998 (age 28); Amite City, Louisiana, U.S.
- Listed height: 6 ft 0 in (1.83 m)
- Listed weight: 170 lb (77 kg)

Career information
- High school: Amite (Amite City)
- College: Alabama (2017–2020)
- NFL draft: 2021: 1st round, 10th overall pick

Career history
- Philadelphia Eagles (2021–present)

Awards and highlights
- Super Bowl champion (LIX); 2× CFP national champion (2017, 2020); CFP National Championship Offensive MVP (2020); Heisman Trophy (2020); Walter Camp Award (2020); Maxwell Award (2020); Fred Biletnikoff Award (2020); Paul Hornung Award (2020); NCAA receptions leader (2020); NCAA receiving yards leader (2020); NCAA receiving touchdowns leader (2020); Unanimous All-American (2020); Second-team All-American (2019); SEC Male Athlete of the Year (2021); SEC Offensive Player of the Year (2020); 2× First-team All-SEC (2019, 2020)

Career NFL statistics as of Week 4, 2026
- Receptions: 411
- Receiving yards: 5,329
- Receiving touchdowns: 33
- Stats at Pro Football Reference

DeVonta Versean Smith (/dəˈvɒnteɪ/ də-VON-tay; born November 14, 1998) is an American professional football wide receiver for the Philadelphia Eagles of the National Football League (NFL). He played college football for the Alabama Crimson Tide, where he recorded 1,856 yards with 23 touchdowns as a senior in 2020. Smith was awarded the Heisman Trophy for his accomplishments as a senior alongside several other awards and honors. He was the first wide receiver to win the Heisman since Desmond Howard in 1991 and only the fourth overall. Smith won two national championships at Alabama prior to being selected by the Eagles tenth overall in the 2021 NFL draft. In his fourth season with the Eagles, Smith won Super Bowl LIX, becoming the fifth football player to win the Super Bowl, a college national title, and the Heisman Trophy.

== Early life ==
Smith attended Amite High Magnet School in his hometown of Amite City, Louisiana. He played basketball and football, as well as ran track and field. A five star prospect, he committed to the University of Alabama to play college football.

== College career ==
=== 2017 season ===
As a true freshman at Alabama in 2017, Smith had eight receptions for 160 yards and three touchdowns in eight games. He scored his first collegiate touchdown on a 27-yard reception against Vanderbilt on September 23. In the 2018 College Football Playoff National Championship against Georgia, Smith's only catch of the game was the game-winning 41-yard touchdown reception from quarterback Tua Tagovailoa on a 2nd and 26 in an overtime 26–23 victory.

=== 2018 season ===
In the College Football Playoff Semifinal at the Orange Bowl, Smith had six receptions for 104 yards and one touchdown in the 45–34 victory over Oklahoma. As a sophomore in 2018, Smith had 42 receptions for 693 yards and six touchdowns in 13 games.

=== 2019 season ===
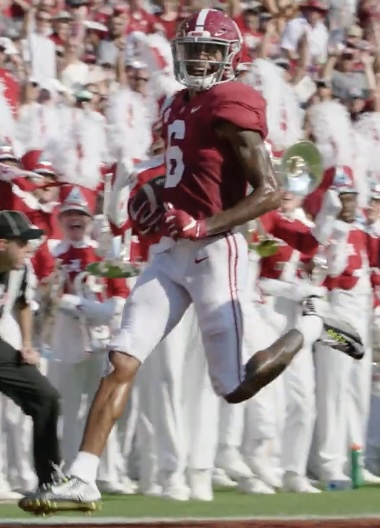
Smith playing for Alabama in 2019

On September 14, Smith had eight receptions for 136 receiving yards and two touchdowns in a 47–23 victory over South Carolina. On September 28, Smith set career highs with 274 yards and five touchdowns in a 59–31 victory against Ole Miss. On November 9, against LSU, he had seven receptions for 213 receiving yards and two touchdowns in the 46–41 loss. Smith led the Crimson Tide in receiving yards and receiving touchdowns, with 1,256 yards and 14 touchdowns on 68 receptions.

After the season, his teammates Henry Ruggs and Jerry Jeudy forfeited their remaining NCAA eligibility to enter the 2020 NFL draft, where they ended up as first-round picks, but Smith decided to return to Alabama for his senior year.

=== 2020 season ===
On October 10, against Ole Miss, Smith had 13 receptions for 164 receiving yards and one receiving touchdown to go along with a rushing touchdown in the 63–48 victory. In the following game, against Georgia, he had 11 receptions for 167 receiving yards and two receiving touchdowns in the 41–24 victory. On October 31, Smith had 11 receptions for 203 receiving yards and four touchdowns against Mississippi State in the 41–0 victory. Smith outgained the entire Bulldogs team 203–200 in the victory. On November 21, Smith broke the all-time SEC career record for most receiving touchdowns, with two to go along with nine receptions for 144 yards in a 63–3 victory over Kentucky. On November 28, in the Iron Bowl against Auburn, he had seven receptions for 171 yards and two touchdowns in the 42–13 victory. The following week, he had eight receptions for 231 receiving yards and three touchdowns in a 55–17 victory over LSU. In the SEC Championship against Florida, he had 15 receptions for 184 receiving yards and two touchdowns in the 52–46 victory. In the College Football Playoff Semifinal at the Rose Bowl Game, he had seven receptions for 130 receiving yards and three receiving touchdowns in the 31–14 victory. In the CFP National Championship Game against Ohio State, Smith set records for title game catches (12) and touchdown receptions (three), and also totaled 215 yards, despite leaving early in the third quarter with a hand injury. Alabama won, 52–24, their sixth title in 12 years, while Smith was named Offensive MVP of the championship game. Smith led the nation with 117 receptions, 1,856 receiving yards, and 23 receiving touchdowns, becoming the second player in history to capture the FBS receiving triple crown.

Smith became the first wide receiver to win the AP Player of the Year award since its inception in 1998. Smith was selected over finalists Kyle Trask, Trevor Lawrence and teammate Mac Jones to win the 2020 Heisman Trophy, becoming the first wide receiver to win the award since Desmond Howard in 1991 and only the fourth overall.

While playing for Alabama, Smith set more than seven school receiving records. Smith accepted an invitation for the 2021 Senior Bowl but did not play. His nickname at Alabama was the "Slim Reaper", given to him by his teammates due to his small frame and athletic ability. Smith was named as a Unanimous All-American. In addition, Smith won the Biletnikoff Award, the Maxwell Award, SEC Offensive Player of the Year, and the Walter Camp Player of the Year Award. He was also named Amateur Athlete of the Year by the Alabama Sports Writers Association and was awarded the Best Male College Athlete ESPY Award.

== Professional career ==
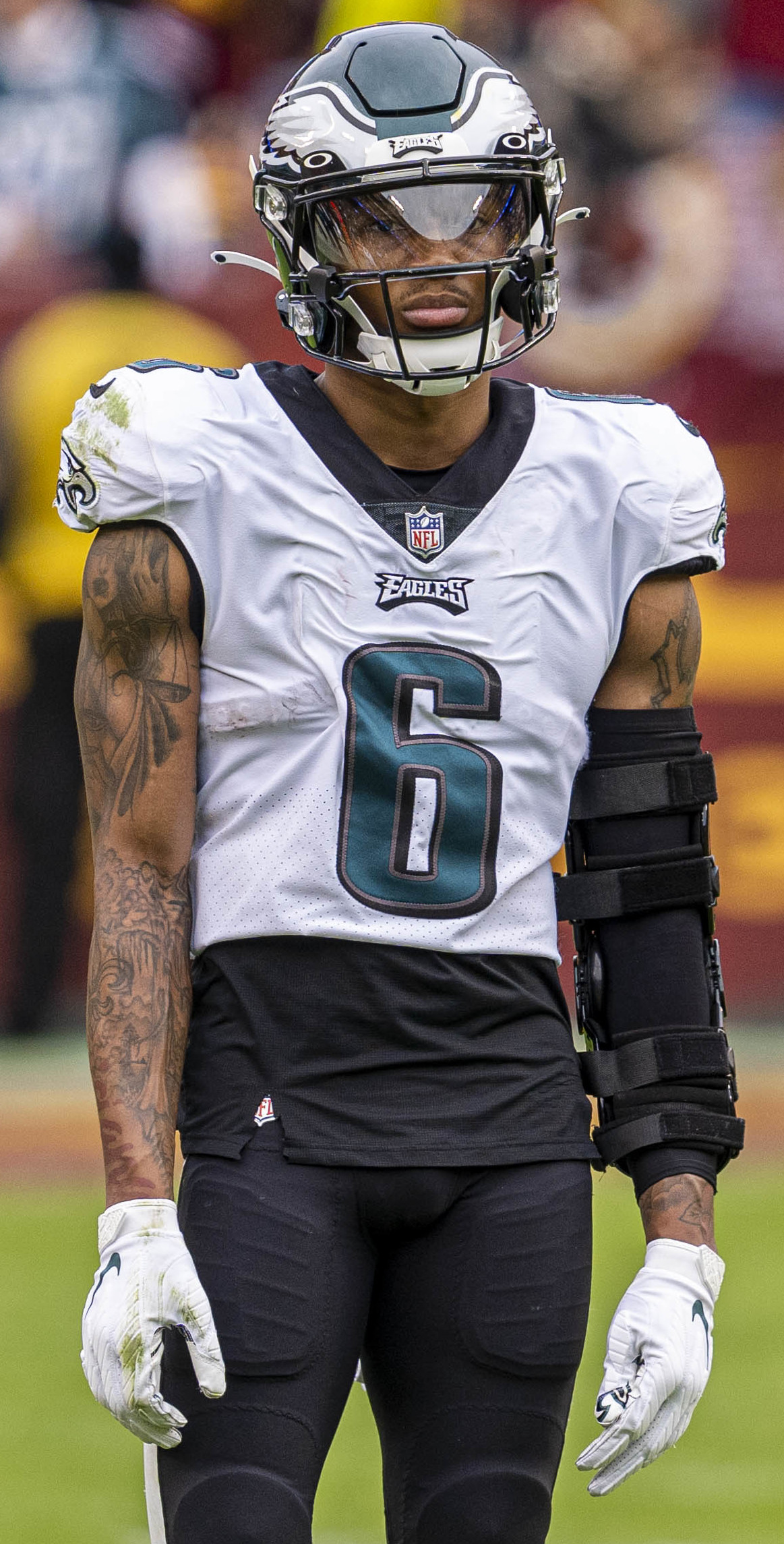
Smith with the Eagles during the 2021 season

Pre-draft measurables
Height	Weight	Arm length	Hand span	Wingspan
6 ft 0 1/4 in (1.84 m)	170 lb (77 kg)	31 1/8 in (0.79 m)	9 1/4 in (0.23 m)	6 ft 6 1/4 in (1.99 m)
All values from Pro Day

=== 2021 season ===
Smith was selected by the Philadelphia Eagles with the tenth overall selection in the 2021 NFL draft, reuniting him with his first college quarterback Jalen Hurts. He was the third wide receiver taken in the draft after Ja'Marr Chase and Jaylen Waddle. Despite his impressive college statistics Smith fell in the draft due to concerns over his raw measurables and that his frame was considered too small to handle playing in the NFL. He signed a four-year rookie contract, worth $20.1 million, on June 3, 2021.

In week 1, against the Atlanta Falcons, Smith scored his first career touchdown on his first catch in the NFL. He had seven receptions for 122 yards in a Week 4 loss to the Kansas City Chiefs. In Week 10, against the Denver Broncos, Smith had two receiving touchdowns in the 30–13 victory. Smith had a solid rookie season for the Eagles, as he recorded 64 receptions for 916 yards and five touchdowns. His 916 yards set the Eagles rookie record for most receiving yards in a single season. Like the rest of the Eagles offense, Smith struggled during the team's 31–15 loss in the Wild Card Round to the Tampa Bay Buccaneers, as he ended the game with four catches (on 11 targets) for 60 yards.

=== 2022 season ===
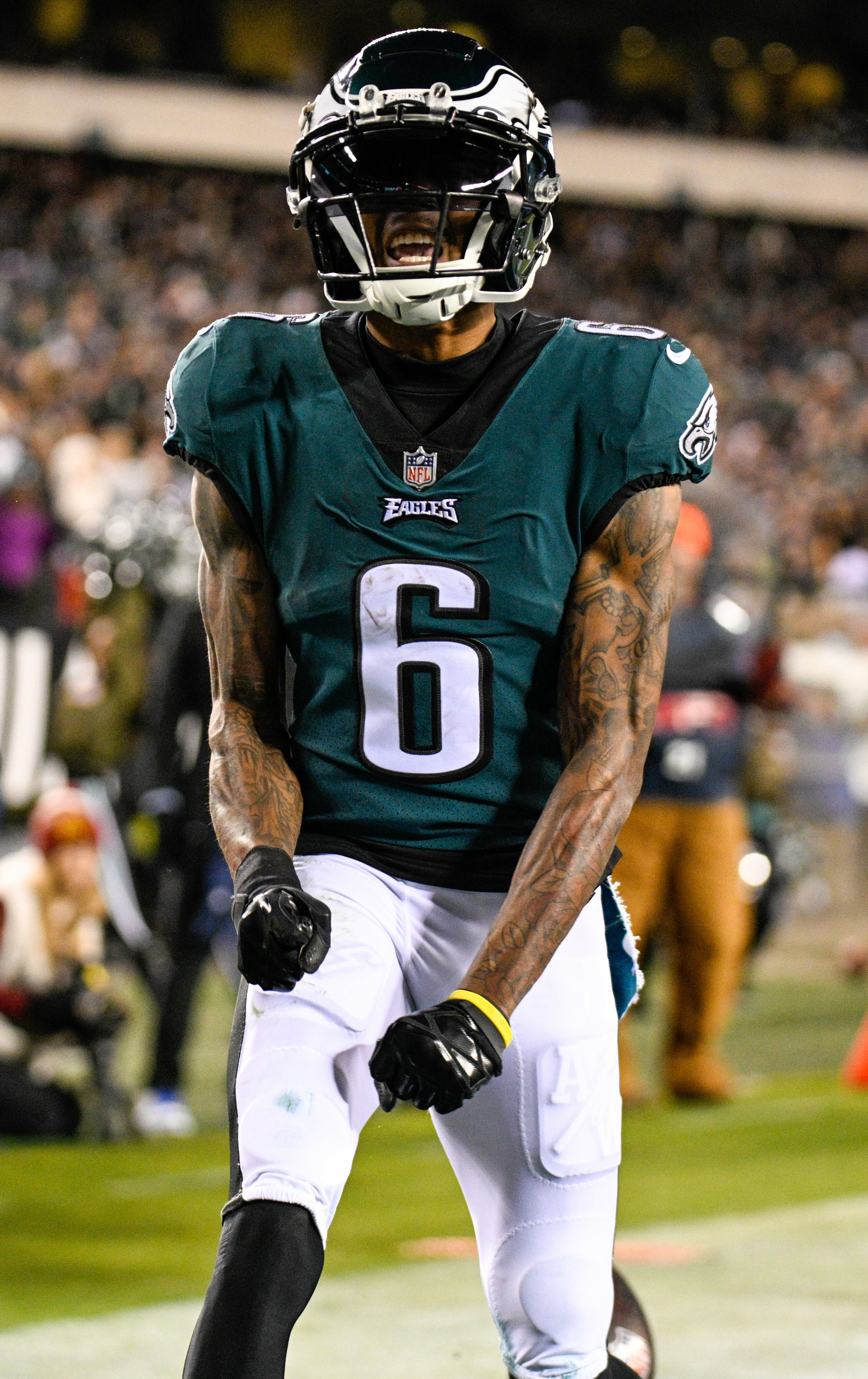
Smith reacts after scoring a touchdown in 2022

In Week 3, against the Washington Commanders, Smith had eight catches for a career-high 169 yards and a touchdown in the 24–8 win. In Week 16 against the Dallas Cowboys, he had eight receptions for 113 receiving yards and two touchdowns in the 40–34 loss.

Smith had five games going over the 100-yard mark in the 2022 season. Smith finished his second season catching 95 passes for 1,196 yards and seven touchdowns. In the Divisional Round against the New York Giants, he had a receiving touchdown in the 38–7 victory. In the NFC Championship against the San Francisco 49ers, Smith recorded a one-handed 29-yard reception on fourth down on the Eagles' opening drive. The catch was likely to have been ruled incomplete upon further review, but the Eagles were able to get a quick snap off before it could be challenged. The catch set up the Eagles with first-and-goal, on which they were able to score a touchdown. The Eagles won the game 31–7. In Super Bowl LVII against the Chiefs, Smith was the game's leading receiver, recording seven catches for 100 yards in the 38–35 loss. He was ranked 100th by his fellow players on the NFL Top 100 Players of 2023.

=== 2023 season ===
In Week 2, against the Vikings, Smith had four receptions for 131 yards and a touchdown in the 34–28 victory. He had one other game going over the 100-yard mark on the regular season, Week 12 against the Bills. He totaled 81 receptions for 1,066 yards and seven touchdowns in 16 games.

In the Wild Card Round loss to the Buccaneers, Smith had eight receptions for 148 yards in the 32–9 loss. He was ranked 90th by his fellow players on the NFL Top 100 Players of 2024.

=== 2024 season ===
On April 15, 2024, Smith signed a three-year, $75 million contract extension with the Eagles. In Week 17 against the Cowboys, he had six receptions for 120 yards and two touchdowns in the 41–7 win. He finished the 2024 season with 68 receptions for 833 yards and eight touchdowns.

Smith caught a 46-yard touchdown thrown by game MVP Jalen Hurts during the third quarter of Super Bowl LIX as the Eagles defeated the Kansas City Chiefs 40–22, avenging their Super Bowl LVII loss from two years earlier and earning Smith his first Super Bowl championship. Smith also became the first Alabama alumnus to catch a touchdown pass in the Super Bowl, as well as the fifth player ever to win a Super Bowl championship, a college football national championship, and a Heisman Trophy during his career.

=== 2025 season ===
In Week 7, against the Minnesota Vikings, Smith had nine catches for a career-high 183 yards and a touchdown in the 28–22 win. He finished the 2025 season with 77 receptions for 1,008 yards and four touchdowns.

== Career statistics ==
=== NFL ===
==== Regular season ====
Year	Team	Games		Receiving					Rushing					Fumbles	
Year	Team	GP	GS	Rec	Yds	Avg	Lng	TD	Att	Yds	Avg	Lng	TD	Fum	Lost
2021	PHI	17	16	64	916	**14.3**	46	5	0	0	0.0	0	0	**1**	**1**
2022	PHI	17	17	**95**	**1,196**	12.6	45	7	0	0	0.0	0	0	**1**	**1**
2023	PHI	16	16	81	1,066	13.2	63	7	0	0	0.0	0	0	**1**	**1**
2024	PHI	13	13	68	833	12.3	49	**8**	**1**	**1**	**1.0**	**1**	0	0	0
2025	PHI	17	16	77	1,008	13.1	**79**	4	0	0	0.0	0	0	0	0
2026	PHI	4	4	26	310	11.9	31	2	0	0	0.0	0	0	0	0
Career		84	82	411	5,329	13.0	79	33	1	1	1.0	1	0	3	3

=== College ===
Legend
	Led the NCAA
**Bold**	Career high

Year	Team	Receiving				
Year	Team	Rec	Yds	Avg	Lng	TD
2017	Alabama	8	160	**20.0**	41	3
2018	Alabama	42	693	16.5	57	6
2019	Alabama	68	1,256	18.5	**85**	14
2020	Alabama	**117**	**1,856**	15.9	66	**23**
Career		235	3,965	16.9	85	46

== Awards and honors ==
NFL

- Super Bowl champion (LIX)
- Ranked No. 100 in the Top 100 Players of 2023
- Ranked No. 90 in the Top 100 Players of 2024

College

- 2× CFP national champion (2017, 2020)
- CFP National Championship Offensive MVP (2020)
- Heisman Trophy (2020)
- Walter Camp Award (2020)
- Maxwell Award (2020)
- Fred Biletnikoff Award (2020)
- Paul Hornung Award (2020)
- AP College Football Player of the Year (2020)
- Sporting News College Football Player of the Year (2020)
- NCAA receptions leader (2020)
- NCAA receiving yards leader (2020)
- NCAA receiving touchdowns leader (2020)
- SEC Male Athlete of the Year (2021)
- SEC Offensive Player of the Year (2020)
- Unanimous All-American (2020)
- Second-team All-American (2019)
- 2× First-team All-SEC (2019, 2020)
- Second-team AP All-Time All-American (2025)

== Personal life ==
On June 13, 2026, Smith married Mya Danielle, his childhood sweetheart. The couple have two daughters.

Smith is a Christian. He said, “I know I wouldn’t be here without God. Without him blessing me with the abilities I have I wouldn’t have got here. Being alone doesn’t get you here. Just being a firm believer in Him and just Him guiding me through. He has helped me get through a lot.”

== See also ==
- List of NCAA major college football yearly receiving leaders
- List of NCAA Division I FBS career receiving touchdowns leaders
