= Ron Hornsby =

American football player (born 1949)

No. 67
- Position: Linebacker

Personal information
- Born: August 16, 1949 (age 77); Baton Rouge, Louisiana, U.S.
- Listed height: 6 ft 2 in (1.88 m)
- Listed weight: 232 lb (105 kg)

Career information
- High school: Greensburg (LA)
- College: Southeastern Louisiana
- NFL draft: 1971: 3rd round, 70th overall pick

Career history
- New York Giants (1971–1974); Green Bay Packers (1975)*; New Orleans Saints (1976)*
- * Offseason or practice squad member only

Career NFL statistics
- Sacks: 2
- Fumble recoveries: 1
- Interceptions: 1
- Stats at Pro Football Reference

Ronald Joseph Hornsby (born August 16, 1949) is an American former professional football player who was a linebacker for the New York Giants of the National Football League (NFL). He played college football for the Southeastern Louisiana Lions.

He was traded to the Green Bay Packers on August 20, 1975 but never played for them. He was released by the Packers on September 1, 1975.

Hornsby signed with the New Orleans Saints in 1976 but was later released.
