= Albie Reisz =

American football player (1917–1985)

No. 26, 63
- Position: Quarterback

Personal information
- Born: November 29, 1917; Lorain, Ohio, U.S.
- Died: May 1, 1985 (aged 67); New Orleans, Louisiana, U.S.
- Listed height: 5 ft 10 in (1.78 m)
- Listed weight: 174 lb (79 kg)

Career information
- High school: Lorain (OH)
- College: Southeastern Louisiana

Career history
- Cleveland / Los Angeles Rams (1944–1946)

Awards and highlights
- NFL champion (1945)
- Stats at Pro Football Reference

Albert Harry "Albie" Reisz (November 29, 1917 – May 1, 1985) was an American professional football player who played quarterback for three seasons for the Cleveland / Los Angeles Rams. In 1947 he joined the Buffalo Bills of the All-America Football Conference.

He died in New Orleans, at 67.
