= Alan Ricard =

American football player and coach (born 1977)

UAB Blazers
- Title: Special teams quality control coach

Personal information
- Born: January 17, 1977 (age 49); Independence, Louisiana, U.S.
- Listed height: 5 ft 11 in (1.80 m)
- Listed weight: 237 lb (108 kg)

Career information
- High school: Amite (LA)
- College: Louisiana–Monroe
- NFL draft: 1999: undrafted

Career history

Playing
- Dallas Cowboys (1999)*; Baltimore Ravens (2000–2005); Buffalo Bills (2006)*; Cleveland Browns (2007)*; Detroit Lions (2007)
- * Offseason or practice squad member only

Coaching
- Nicholls (2015) Running backs coach; Louisiana–Monroe (2016–2019) Running backs coach; Jackson State (2020–2022) Special teams coordinator; UAB (2023–2025) Special teams quality control coach; Grambling State (2025–present) Special teams coordinator

Career NFL statistics
- Games played: 55
- Rushing attempts: 43
- Rushing yards: 173
- Rushing touchdowns: 2
- Receptions: 32
- Receiving yards: 179
- Stats at Pro Football Reference

Alan Cardell Ricard (born January 17, 1977) is an American former professional football player who was a fullback in the National Football League (NFL) for the Baltimore Ravens and Detroit Lions. He played college football for the Louisiana–Monroe Warhawks.

== Early life ==
Ricard attended Amite High Magnet School. As a senior, he played linebacker, registering 117 tackles and 14 sacks, while helping the team finish with a 15–0 record and win the class 4-A title. He received All-district honors.

He accepted a football scholarship from the University of Louisiana at Monroe. He did not have any playing time as a freshman. As a sophomore, he was the team's second leading rusher with 52 carries for 189 yards and one touchdown, while making 6 catches for 42 yards.

As a junior, he collected 62 carries for 183 yards, 3 rushing touchdowns and 9 receptions for 42 yards. As a senior, he led the team with 100 carries for 399 yards and seven touchdowns. He was fourth on the team with 9 catches for 82 yards and one touchdown.

== Professional career ==
Ricard was signed as an undrafted free agent by the Dallas Cowboys after the 1999 NFL draft on April 23. On August 3, he was waived before the start of the season.

In 2000, he signed with the Baltimore Ravens. On August 26, 2000, he was released and later re-signed to the practice squad on August 29. In 2001, he was a backup fullback behind Sam Gash and Obafemi Ayanbadejo.

In 2002, he became a starter at fullback, helping Jamal Lewis rush for 1,327 yards. In 2003, he was a key contributor for the offense, helping Lewis achieve his 2,066 yard rushing season, while being named to the Pro Bowl as an alternate.

In 55 career games with the Ravens, including 32 starts, Ricard carried just 43 times for 172 yards and two touchdowns and posted 32 receptions for 179 yards. However, he was a dominant blocker at times in the running game and was solid in pass protection.

In 2005, he was passed on the depth chart by Ovie Mughelli and only played in 2 games, while being limited with injuries. On October 28, 2005, he was placed on the injured reserve list with calf injuries on both legs. On July 17, 2006, he was released.

On August 1, 2006, he was signed as free agent by the Buffalo Bills. On September 2, 2006, he was released after being limited with a quad injury.

On April 16, 2007, he signed as a free agent with the Cleveland Browns, reuniting with running back Jamal Lewis. On June 15, 2007, his contract was terminated.

On July 30, 2007, he signed as a free agent with the Detroit Lions. On August 15, 2007, he was placed on the injured reserve list. He wasn't re-signed after the season.

== Coaching career ==
In 2013, he was a student assistant coach at the University of Louisiana-Monroe. In 2015, Ricard was an assistant coach for the Nicholls State University team. In 2016, he was hired as an assistant coach at the University of Louisiana-Monroe. In 2020, he was hired as the special teams coach at Jackson State University.
