= Columbia Theatre for the Performing Arts =

Theatre in Hammond, Louisiana, US

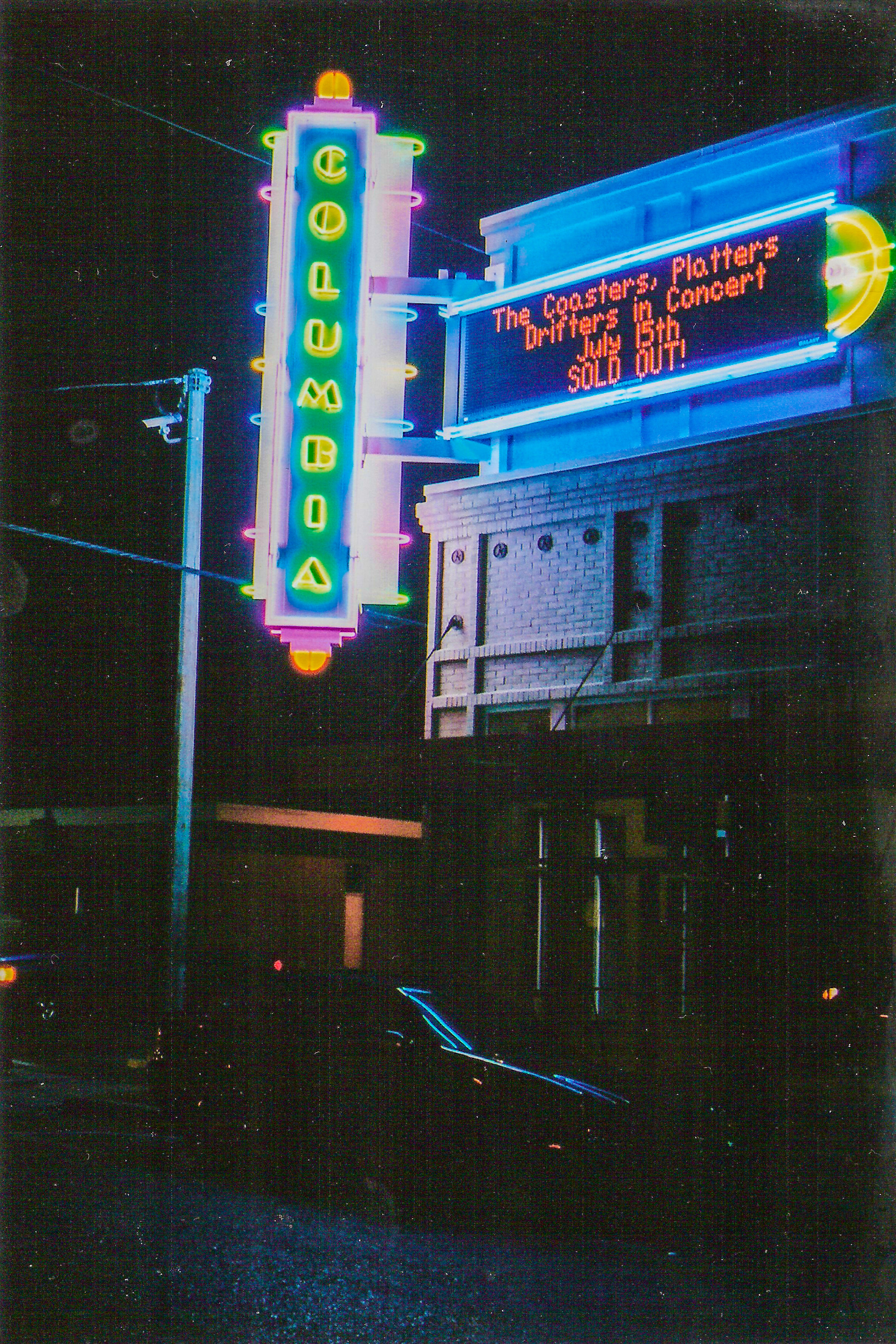
- Interactive map of Columbia Theatre for the Performing Arts
- Address: 220 E. Thomas St.
- Location: Hammond, Louisiana
- Coordinates: 30.504324°N 90.458761°W
- Owner: Southeastern Louisiana University
- Capacity: 830
- Type: Performing arts center

Construction
- Opened: September 1, 1928

Website
- www.columbiatheatre.org

The Columbia Theatre for the Performing Arts is a historic theatre located in downtown Hammond, Louisiana.

== History ==
The theatre opened on September 1, 1928, the same year that Hammond Junior College became Southeastern Louisiana College. Originally designed for the presentation of motion pictures, vaudeville acts, and local theatrical productions, the Columbia was the largest theater in Hammond. It featured the first theatre organ and the first talking pictures.

The Columbia became the center for entertainment during the depression and war years of the 1930s and 1940s. By the 1950s and 1960s, the theater needed to be renovated. This was an era in which downtown businesses were suffering due to the development of regional malls and subdivisions. Although a sincere effort to remodel and reopen the theater was made in the late 1970s by businessman Wiley Sharp, it proved to be too challenging for one individual. By the early 1980s, the Columbia was vacant, leaking, and infested with termites. In the early 1990s, a delegation of local citizens proposed leveling the Columbia and replacing it with a parking lot.

Another group of citizens, led by Marguerite Walter, Director of the Hammond Downtown Development District (DDD), worked to save the Columbia. She enlisted Harriet Vogt, Director of Fanfare at Southeastern Louisiana University (SLU), who guided the university to join the League of Historic American Theaters, and to seek their advice. The League, which stressed the importance of saving old theaters, asked Killis Almond of San Antonio, Texas, to visit Hammond. Almond urged the group to save the Columbia and to do it quickly, as the roof was in danger of collapsing.

Walter and Vogt worked with local attorney Rodney Cashe to register the Columbia as a non-profit 501 (c) (3). The group also sought funding from Louisiana state Representative Bob Livingston and state Senator John Hainkel. Walter wrote several successful grant applications for state capital outlay funding, the first to repair the roof. The City of Hammond joined in by leasing the building and providing insurance coverage.

By 1994 First Guaranty Bank owned the structure and offered to donate it to the DDD under the condition that it be converted back to a performance space. The DDD selected Holly and Smith Architects to conduct a restoration study and design plans for the renovation. At this point, Hainkel met with SLU President Sally Clausen and her staff, along with Stan Dameron of First Guaranty Bank. Hainkel proposed turning the theater over to SLU for operation after the restoration. Working together, the DDD, City of Hammond, and SLU secured $4,900,000 in capital outlay funds to restore the Columbia and to also purchase the adjacent old J. C. Penney building to provide additional space for dressing rooms, rehearsal space, and offices.

To expand the lobby space and secure a loading dock, retired Judge Leon Ford approached H. P. Forbes, owner of the old Firestone Tire building located on the east side of the Columbia. Forbes donated a portion of the building, and Livingston arranged a federal grant to purchase and renovate the entire building. Upon completion of the restoration, in Spring 2001, Southeastern Louisiana University received ownership from the DDD.

== Current operation ==
In 2002, the Columbia Theatre opened as a performing arts center presenting theatrical, concert, and dance events. The main theatre seats 830; there is also a smaller concert venue called The Studio Theatre. Since 2020, the Columbia Theatre implemented a self-produce model for productions that involves auditions, set and costume design, rehearsal schedules and creative teams made up of community members, business owners and hard working actors. The new model has proven to be very successful and is growing each year. The Columbia Theatre is considered the jewel of downtown Hammond and proudly displays the talent of Hammond and all surrounding areas.

== See also ==
- List of music venues
- Theatre in Louisiana
