= Nathan Stanley =

American football player (born 1989)

No. 10
- Position: Quarterback

Personal information
- Born: January 24, 1989 (age 37); Tahlequah, Oklahoma, U.S.
- Listed height: 6 ft 4 in (1.93 m)
- Listed weight: 225 lb (102 kg)

Career information
- High school: Sequoyah (Tahlequah)
- College: Southeastern Louisiana
- NFL draft: 2013: undrafted

Career history
- Baltimore Ravens (2013)*; San Jose SaberCats (2014–2015); Calgary Stampeders (2014)*; Los Angeles KISS (2016); Washington Valor (2017)*
- * Offseason or practice squad member only

Awards and highlights
- ArenaBowl champion (2015)

Career AFL statistics
- Comp. / Att.: 444 / 743
- Passing yards: 5,228
- TD–INT: 112–25
- QB rating: 104.86
- Rushing TD: 8
- Stats at ArenaFan.com

Nathan Thomas Stanley (born January 24, 1989) is an American former professional football player who was a quarterback in the Arena Football League (AFL). He played college football for the Southeastern Louisiana Lions after transferring from the Ole Miss Rebels. He was signed by the Baltimore Ravens of the National Football League (NFL) as an undrafted free agent in 2013.

== College career ==
Stanley played for the Ole Miss Rebels from 2009 to 2010, and the Southeastern Louisiana Lions from 2011 to 2012. He finished his college career with totals of 3,364 passing yards, 15 passing touchdowns, 17 interceptions, and one rushing touchdown.

== Professional career ==
Stanley signed with the Baltimore Ravens on May 3, 2013, and was released by the team on May 7, 2013.

Stanley initially joined the San Jose SaberCats as a backup quarterback. Stanley became the starter, however, when original starter Russ Michna was declared out with concussion-like symptoms.

On October 13, 2014, Stanley was signed to the practice roster of the Calgary Stampeders of the Canadian Football League. He was released by the Stampeders on November 6, 2014.

Stanley returned to the SaberCats in 2015, where he again served as backup (this time to Erik Meyer). An injury to Meyer forced Stanley to once again become the team's starter. He returned to the role of backup following Meyer's return. In his second season, Stanley threw a total of twenty touchdown passes (and no interceptions) while winning every game in which he started.

Stanley's SaberCats ultimately advanced to ArenaBowl XXVIII, where they defeated the Jacksonville Sharks 68–47. In the fourth quarter, Stanley was briefly inserted as quarterback for the SaberCats; his lone pass attempt was caught for a touchdown. Stanley became the fourth SaberCats quarterback to throw a touchdown pass in an ArenaBowl (following John Dutton, Mark Grieb, and 2015 teammate Erik Meyer).

On November 9, 2015, Stanley was assigned to the Los Angeles KISS.

On October 14, 2016, Stanley was assigned to the Washington Valor during the dispersal draft. On March 21, 2017, he was placed on refuse to report.

== Career statistics ==
=== AFL ===
Year	Team	Passing							Rushing		
Year	Team	Cmp	Att	Pct	Yds	TD	Int	Rtg	Att	Yds	TD
2014	San Jose	201	335	60.0	2,436	50	13	103.53	24	25	4
2015	San Jose	57	92	62.0	723	20	0	126.04	6	7	1
2016	Los Angeles	186	316	58.9	2,069	42	12	95.82	23	21	3
Career		444	743	59.8	5,228	112	25	104.86	53	53	8

=== College ===
Season	Passing							Rushing			
Season	Comp	Att	Yards	Pct.	TD	Int	QB rating	Att	Yards	Avg	TD
Ole Miss Rebels
2009	11	23	163	47.8	1	1	113.0	3	−12	−4.0	0
2010	17	32	261	53.1	3	1	146.3	6	−40	−6.7	0
Southeastern Louisiana Lions
2011	28	58	282	48.3	2	6	80.4	13	5	0.4	0
2012	177	327	2,658	54.1	9	9	107.8	64	−30	−2.7	1
Career	233	440	3,364	53.0	15	17	120.7	86	-77	-0.9	1
