= Jerry Davis (American football) =

American football player (1924–2006)

No. 31, 40
- Positions: Defensive back, halfback

Personal information
- Born: January 5, 1924; Savannah, Georgia, U.S.
- Died: October 18, 2006 (aged 82)
- Listed height: 5 ft 10 in (1.78 m)
- Listed weight: 178 lb (81 kg)

Career information
- High school: Covington (LA)
- College: Southeastern Louisiana
- NFL draft: 1948: 19th round, 175th overall pick

Career history
- Chicago Cardinals (1948–1951); Dallas Texans (1952)

Career NFL statistics
- Rushing yards: 70
- Rushing average: 5.4
- Receptions: 4
- Receiving yards: 24
- Interceptions: 24
- Fumble recoveries: 7
- Total touchdowns: 4
- Stats at Pro Football Reference

Jerome W. Davis (January 5, 1924 – October 18, 2006) was a professional American football defensive back in the National Football League (NFL). He played college football at Southeastern Louisiana. He played for the Chicago Cardinals (1948–1951) and the Dallas Texans (1952).
