= Harlan Miller =

American football player (born 1994)

No. 34, 48
- Position: Safety

Personal information
- Born: June 20, 1994 (age 32); Kentwood, Louisiana, U.S.
- Listed height: 6 ft 0 in (1.83 m)
- Listed weight: 182 lb (83 kg)

Career information
- High school: Kentwood
- College: Southeastern Louisiana
- NFL draft: 2016: 6th round, 205th overall pick

Career history
- Arizona Cardinals (2016–2017); Washington Redskins (2018); Los Angeles Wildcats (2020); Massachusetts Pirates (2022–2023)

Career NFL statistics
- Total tackles: 13
- Fumble recoveries: 1
- Pass deflections: 1
- Interceptions: 1
- Stats at Pro Football Reference

Harlan Miller (born June 20, 1994) is an American former professional football player who was a safety in the National Football League (NFL). He played college football for the Southeastern Louisiana Lions, and was selected by the Arizona Cardinals in the sixth round of the 2016 NFL draft.

== Professional career ==
External videos
- Miller's NFL Combine workout
- Miller gets drafted by Arizona

Pre-draft measurables
Height	Weight	Arm length	Hand span	40-yard dash	10-yard split	20-yard split	20-yard shuttle	Three-cone drill	Vertical jump	Broad jump	Bench press
6 ft 0 in (1.83 m)	182 lb (83 kg)	31 3/8	9 3/8	4.65 s	1.63 s	2.70 s	4.43 s	7.44 s	35.5 in (0.90 m)	9 ft 10 in (3.00 m)	6 reps
All values are from NFL Combine

=== Arizona Cardinals ===
Miller was selected in the sixth round (205th overall) by the Arizona Cardinals in the 2016 NFL draft. He signed a four-year contract with the Cardinals on May 9, 2016. On September 3, Miller was released by the Cardinals, but was re-signed to the team's practice squad the following day. He was promoted to the active roster on December 19.

On September 2, 2017, Miller was waived by the Cardinals; he was re-signed to the practice squad the next day. He was promoted to the active roster on November 13. Miller was waived on November 28, and was re-signed to the practice squad. He was promoted back to the active roster on December 7.

On May 9, 2018, Miller was released by the Cardinals. On August 15, Miller was re-signed by the Cardinals. He was waived on September 1.

=== Washington Redskins ===
On December 18, 2018, Miller was signed by the Washington Redskins. He was waived by Washington on April 30, 2019.

=== Los Angeles Wildcats ===
Miller was selected by the Los Angeles Wildcats of the XFL in the 7th round during phase four of the 2020 XFL draft . He had his contract terminated when the league suspended operations on April 10, 2020.

=== Massachusetts Pirates ===
On December 9, 2021, Miller signed with the Massachusetts Pirates of the Indoor Football League (IFL). On January 17, 2023, Miller re-signed with the Pirates.
