= Billy Andrews =

American football player (born 1945)

No. 52, 51, 53
- Position: Linebacker

Personal information
- Born: June 14, 1945 (age 81); Clinton, Louisiana, U.S.
- Listed height: 6 ft 0 in (1.83 m)
- Listed weight: 220 lb (100 kg)

Career information
- High school: Clinton
- College: Southeastern Louisiana
- NFL draft: 1967: 13th round, 333rd overall pick

Career history
- Cleveland Browns (1967–1974); San Diego Chargers (1975); Kansas City Chiefs (1976–1977)

Career NFL statistics
- Fumble recoveries: 14
- Interceptions: 7
- Touchdowns: 1
- Sacks: 3
- Stats at Pro Football Reference

William Doughty Andrews Jr. (born June 14, 1945) is an American former professional football player who was a linebacker for 11 seasons in the National Football League (NFL), primarily with the Cleveland Browns. He played college football for the Southeastern Louisiana Lions.

Andrews scored his only NFL touchdown in the first Monday Night Football game televised by ABC on September 21, 1970. Late in the fourth quarter, Andrews intercepted a pass by the New York Jets' Joe Namath and returned it 25 yards for a touchdown to secure the Browns' 31–21 victory.

He now lives in Bluff Creek, Louisiana, a small community outside of Clinton.
