= Donald Dykes =

American football player (born 1955)

No. 26
- Position: Cornerback

Personal information
- Born: August 24, 1955 (age 71); Independence, Louisiana, U.S.
- Listed height: 5 ft 11 in (1.80 m)
- Listed weight: 182 lb (83 kg)

Career information
- High school: Hammond (Hammond, Louisiana)
- College: Southeastern Louisiana
- NFL draft: 1979: 3rd round, 68th overall pick

Career history
- New York Jets (1979–1981); San Diego Chargers (1982); Jacksonville Bulls (1984–1985)

Career NFL statistics
- Games played: 47
- Games started: 27
- Interceptions: 5
- Stats at Pro Football Reference

Donald Ray Dykes (born August 24, 1955) is an American former professional football player who was a cornerback for four seasons with the New York Jets and San Diego Chargers of the National Football League (NFL). He also played in the United States Football League (USFL). He played college football for the Southeastern Louisiana Lions.

Dykes was an assistant football coach at the University of Arkansas at Monticello. As of 2016, Donald Dykes is in his fifth year at Southwest Mississippi Community College as defensive backs coach. He came to Southwest from Glenville (WV) State College where he held the same position in the 2011 season.

== Early life and education ==
A native of Hammond, LA, Dykes won numerous individual state track and field championships at Hammond High School and helped the Tornadoes win two team championships. He was also a 10-time All-State selection and a one-time All American selection.

Dykes attended Southeastern Louisiana University where he was a four-year letterman in both football and track and field. An eight-time All-American in track and field, he won three national championships including two in the long jump. In 1977, he set a school and Louisiana state record with a long jump of 26’ 3” which was 17th best in the world. He was also an NAIA outdoor champion in the event.

As a member of the SLU football team, he blocked 12 kicks and had six interceptions. He graduated from SLU in 1988 with a B. A. degree in criminology.

== Professional career ==
A third-round NFL draft pick by the New York Jets in 1979, Dykes played for the Jets from 1979 to 1981. His best season came in 1980 when he had five interceptions. Also in 1980, he qualified for the Olympic trials in the long jump. He was traded to the San Diego Chargers in 1982 and signed by the Tampa Bay Buccaneers as a free agent in 1983. Later, he played for the Houston Gamblers and Jacksonville Bulls of the USFL.

He received a master's degree from Delta State University in Health and Physical Education in 1994 and helped coach the Statesmen to an NCAA Division II national championship in 2000.

He began his coaching career at Hammond High School in 1989. Other coaching stops along the way include Ft. Valley State (GA) University, Tennessee-Chattanooga and Arkansas–Monticello.

== Personal life ==
Dykes has two children and three grandchildren.
