= Bryan Bennett =

American football player (born 1992)

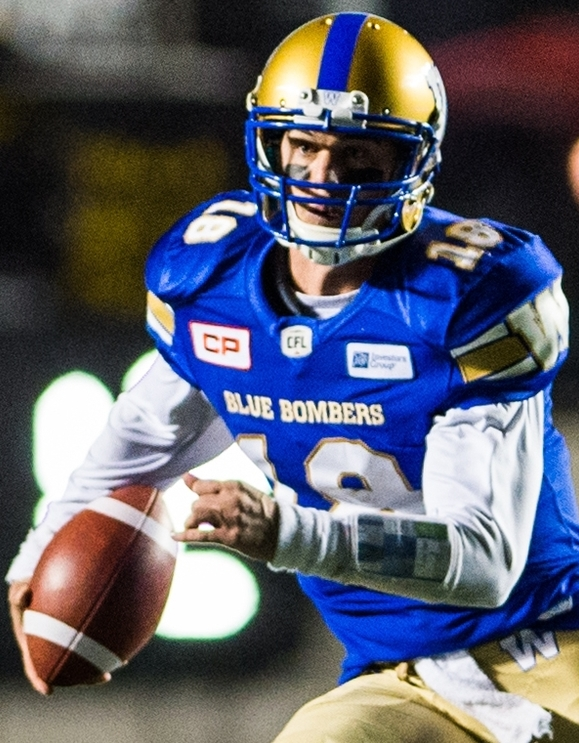
- Bennett with the Winnipeg Blue Bombers in 2016

Profile
- Position: Quarterback

Personal information
- Born: March 6, 1992 (age 34); Tarzana, California, U.S.
- Listed height: 6 ft 2 in (1.88 m)
- Listed weight: 211 lb (96 kg)

Career information
- High school: Crespi Carmelite (Encino, California)
- College: Oregon (2010–2012); Southeastern Louisiana (2013–2014)
- NFL draft: 2015: undrafted

Career history
- Indianapolis Colts (2015)*; Winnipeg Blue Bombers (2015–2016)*; Saskatchewan Roughriders (2017)*; Winnipeg Blue Bombers (2018); Saskatchewan Roughriders (2019)
- * Offseason or practice squad member only

Awards and highlights
- 2014 First-team All-Southland Conference; 2013 College Sports Journal First-team All-American; 2013 Southland Conference Player of the Year; 2013 First-team All-Southland Conference

Career CFL statistics
- Passing completions: 4
- Passing attempts: 8
- Passing yards: 72
- TD–INT: 0–0
- Stats at CFL.ca

Bryan Alton Bennett (born March 6, 1992) is an American former professional football player who was a quarterback in the Canadian Football League (CFL). He played college football for the Oregon Ducks and Southeastern Louisiana Lions, and signed with the Indianapolis Colts of the National Football League (NFL) as an undrafted free agent in 2015. He was also a member of the CFL's Saskatchewan Roughriders and Winnipeg Blue Bombers.

== Early life ==
Bennett was born in Los Angeles, California, to Brian and Shyhra Bennett. He also has two sisters named Kristina and Hailey. Bennett attended Crespi Carmelite High School.

== College career ==
Bennett committed to the Oregon Ducks on June 18, 2009 where he played for two years, until he transferred to Southeastern Louisiana. He finished his four-year college career with totals of 6,102 passing yards, 48 passing touchdowns, 22 interceptions, 2,080 rushing yards, and 37 rushing touchdowns. He was inducted into the Southeastern Athletics Hall of Fame in 2019.

== Professional career ==
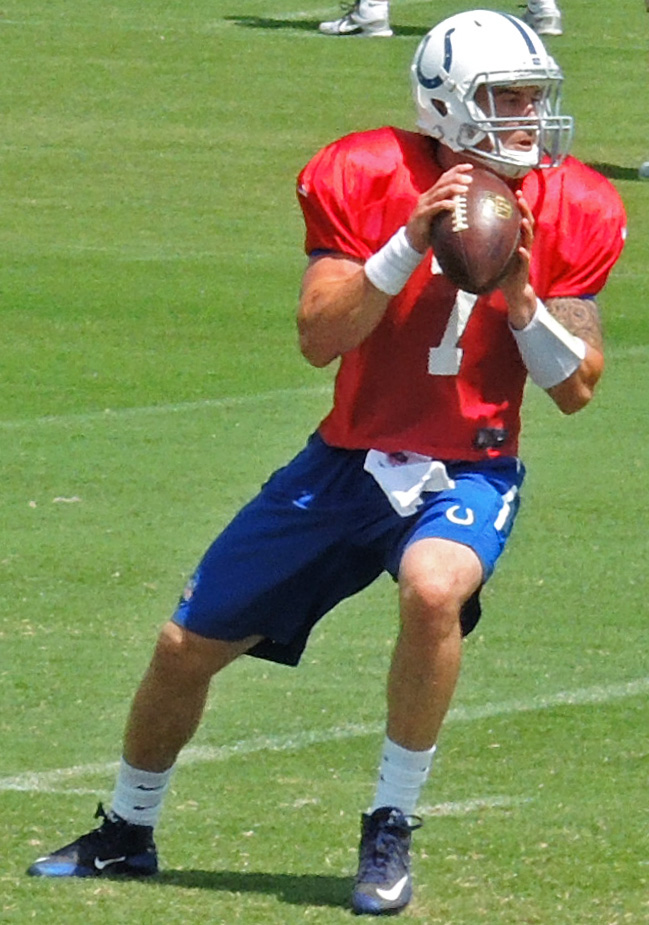
Bennett in 2015 at training camp for the Indianapolis Colts

Bennett signed with the Indianapolis Colts as an undrafted free agent on May 4, 2015 until he was released during final roster cuts on September 5, 2015.

He was later signed to the practice roster by the Winnipeg Blue Bombers on October 22, 2015.

On November 28, 2016, Bennett signed with the Saskatchewan Roughriders (CFL). During the Riders 2017 training camp Bennett battled former NFL quarterback Vince Young and Canadian Brandon Bridge for the backup quarterback position behind veteran Kevin Glenn. Bennet was released by the Roughriders on June 17, 2017, as the team trimmed its roster down for the start of the season.

Bennett returned to the Blue Bombers when he signed with the team on May 24, 2018, at the start of training camp.

Bennett was signed by the Roughriders on June 17, 2019. He dressed in 17 regular season games as the short-yardage quarterback, attempting no passes, but rushed the ball 16 times for 69 yards and one touchdown. During the following off-season, on April 8, 2020, he was released.

== Career statistics ==
=== CFL ===
Season	Team	Passing								Rushing			
Season	Team	GP	Comp	Att	Yards	Pct.	TD	Int	QB rating	Car	Yards	Avg	TD
2018	WPG	2	4	8	72	50.0%	0	0	81.3	2	34	17.0	0
2019	SSK	8	0	0	0	0%	0	0	0	16	69	4.3	1

=== College ===
Season	Passing							Rushing			
Season	Comp	Att	Yards	Pct.	TD	Int	QB rating	Att	Yards	Avg	TD
Oregon Ducks
2011	25	46	369	54.3	6	0	164.8	23	200	8.7	0
2012	20	37	211	54.1	3	3	112.5	39	165	4.2	6
Southeastern Louisiana Lions
2013	215	354	3,165	60.7	21	11	149.2	183	1,046	5.7	16
2014	143	289	2,357	49.5	18	8	133.0	137	669	4.9	15
Career	403	726	6,102	55.5	48	22	141.9	382	2,080	5.4	37
