= Southeastern Louisiana Lions football =

Intercollegiate American football team

2026 Southeastern Louisiana Lions football team
- First season: 1930; 96 years ago
- Athletic director: Jay Artigues
- Head coach: Frank Scelfo; 9th season, 53–39 (.576)
- Location: Hammond, Louisiana
- Stadium: Strawberry Stadium (capacity: 7,408)
- NCAA division: Division I FCS
- Conference: Southland
- Colors: Green and gold
- All-time record: 351–306–17 (.533)

Conference championships
- LIC: 1946 GSC: 1952, 1953, 1954, 1956, 1960, 1961 SLC: 2013, 2014, 2022
- Rivalries: Nicholls (rivalry); Northwestern State (rivalry); Louisiana (rivalry)
- Marching band: Spirit Of The Southland
- Website: LionSports.net

The Southeastern Louisiana Lions football program is the intercollegiate American football team for Southeastern Louisiana University located in the U.S. state of Louisiana. The team competes in the NCAA Division I Football Championship Subdivision (FCS) and are members of the Southland Conference. Southeastern Louisiana's first football team was fielded in 1930. The team plays its home games at the 7,408 seat Strawberry Stadium in Hammond, Louisiana. The Lions are currently coached by Frank Scelfo, who started coaching here in 2018.

== History ==
When the program was restarted again in 2003, after an 18-year hiatus, Hal Mumme, formerly the head coach at the University of Kentucky, was hired as head coach. Mumme became the 12th head coach in program history and he hired Woody Widenhofer as his defensive coordinator. Upon its return, SLU decided to compete at the NCAA Division I-AA level. The team finished with a 5–7 record, the sixth-best record among start-up Division I programs since 1980. Forty-six school and/or national records were broken with freshman quarterback Martin Hankins setting 21 new standards. Before a packed house on a rainy night, Southeastern opened its first season in 18 years rallying to defeat Arkansas-Monticello, 22–17, as Hankins hit Choni Francis on a 22-yard scoring pass with 6:49 remaining in the game. Scoring the first touchdown after 18 years cemented Lions football once again. The team finished its first season 5–7 and posted a 7–4 mark in 2004. The program had a big 51–17 win over #6 McNeese State and entered the Top 25 in the national I-AA rankings. Southeastern Louisiana ranked first among NCAA Division I-AA teams in total offense per game (537.1 yards) and passing offense per game (408 yards) in 2003.

After receiving an invitation from the Southland Conference for the football program to join, the conference where the rest of SLU's sports competed, it began conference play in 2005 - where it remains a current member today.

In 2012, Ron Roberts took over as head coach for the Lions and led them to a 5–6 record. The Lions finished the season with a 5–2 record in conference play, which was the best conference record the Lions had posted in the Southland since joining in 2005. The following year, the Lions posted an 11–3 overall record. The Lions were led at quarterback by Oregon transfer Bryan Bennett. They finished with a perfect 7–0 record in conference play and earned their first-ever trip to the NCAA Division 1 playoffs. They earned a first-round bye. In the second round, the SLU faced Sam Houston State in a rematch of the regular-season game played between the two in which Southeastern won 34–21. Quarterback Bryan Bennett led a late game-winning drive to give the Lions a 30–29 thrilling victory. The Lions lost to the New Hampshire Wildcats in the quarterfinals 20–17. Bennett was first-team all-Conference in 2013. Placekicker Seth Sebastian and kickoff returner Xavier Roberson won 2013 FCS Awards from College Football Performance Awards for the top positional performances.

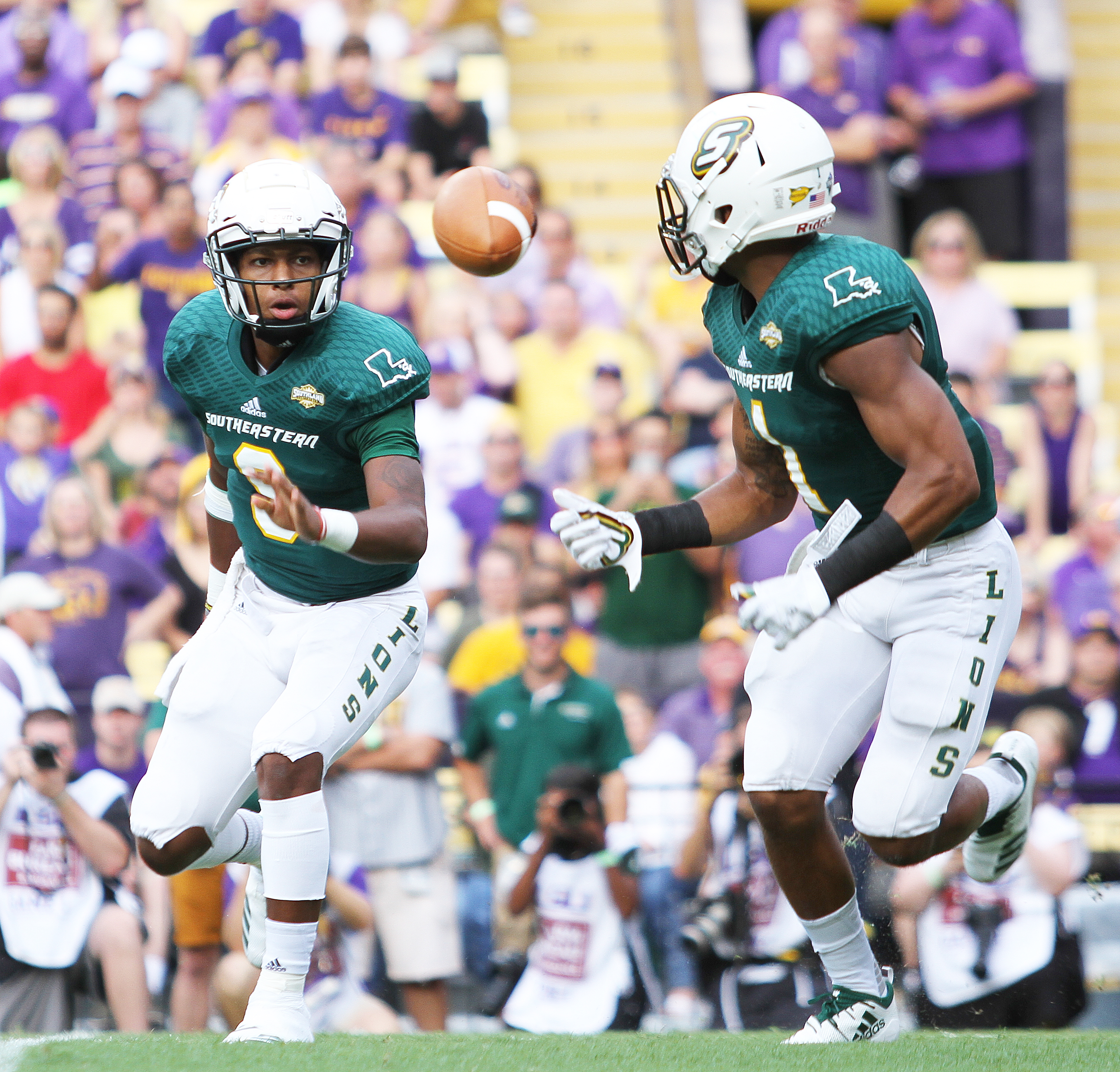
The Lions playing at Tiger Stadium in 2018

After posting a 7–4 regular-season record in 2019 the lions earned the program's third playoff berth, hosting 10th ranked Villanova in the first round. After trailing 31–14 at halftime, Southeastern came back to upset the wildcats 45–44, led by quarterback Chason Virgil's 474 yards passing.

== Conference affiliations ==
- Independent (1930–1942)
- Louisiana Intercollegiate Conference (1946–1947)
- Gulf States Conference (1948–1970)
- Mid-South Conference / Gulf South Conference (1971–1978)
- NCAA Division II independent (1979)
- NCAA Division I-AA independent (1980–1983, 2003–2004)
- Gulf Star Conference (1984–1985)
- No football team (1986–2002)
- Southland Conference (2005–present)

== Championships ==
=== Conference championships ===
Southeastern Louisiana has won 10 conference championships.

Year	Conference	Coach	Overall record	Conference record
1946	Louisiana Intercollegiate Conference	Ned McGehee	9–0‡	4–0
1952†	Gulf States Conference	Stan Galloway	6–1–2	3–0–2
1953†	Gulf States Conference	Stan Galloway	6–3	5–1
1954	Gulf States Conference	Stan Galloway	9–0	6–0
1956	Gulf States Conference	Stan Galloway	6–3	4–1
1960†	Gulf States Conference	Stan Galloway	9–1	4–1
1961†	Gulf States Conference	Stan Galloway	9–1	4–1
2013	Southland Conference	Ron Roberts	11–3	7–0
2014†	Southland Conference	Ron Roberts	9–4	7–1
2022†	Southland Conference	Frank Scelfo	8–3	5–1

† Co-championship

‡ Includes victory in 1946 Burley Bowl.

== Playoff appearances ==
=== NCAA Division I-AA/FCS ===
Southeastern Louisiana has a 4–6 record in six appearances in the I-AA/FCS playoffs since 1978.

Year	Round	Opponent	Result
2013	Second Round; Quarterfinals	Sam Houston State; New Hampshire	W 30–29; L 17–20
2014	First Round	Sam Houston State	L 17–21
2019	First Round; Second Round	Villanova; Montana	W 45–44; L 28–73
2021	First Round; Second Round	Florida A&M; James Madison	W 38–14; L 20–59
2022	First Round; Second Round	Idaho; Samford	W 45–42; L 42–48 ^{OT}
2025	First Round	Illinois State	L 3–21

== Rivalries ==
=== Nicholls ===
Southeastern Louisiana leads the series with Nicholls 18–17 through the 2024 season.

=== Northwestern State ===
Southeastern Louisiana leads the series with Northwestern State 41–29 through the 2025 season.

=== Louisiana ===
The Cypress Mug is the turned, polished mahogany mug awarded to the winner of the Louisiana–Southeastern football game. Louisiana leads the series 21–17–3 with the last game played in 2022.

== Notable former players ==
Notable alumni include:

- Robert Alford, former NFL cornerback for the Atlanta Falcons
- Wilson Alvarez, former NFL placekicker for the Seattle Seahawks
- Billy Andrews, former NFL linebacker for the Cleveland Browns
- Horace Belton, former NFL running back for the Kansas City Chiefs
- Jerry Davis, former NFL defensive back for the Chicago Cardinals
- Donald Dykes, former NFL defensive back for the New York Jets
- Calvin Favron, former NFL linebacker for the St. Louis Cardinals
- Ron Hornsby, former NFL linebacker for the New York Giants
- Kevin Hughes, former NFL offensive tackle for the Carolina Panthers
- Harlan Miller, former NFL safety for the Arizona Cardinals
- Nathan Stanley, former Arena Football League quarterback for the San Jose SaberCats
- Maxie Williams, former NFL offensive lineman for the Miami Dolphins

== Future non-conference opponents ==
Announced non-conference opponents as of August 4, 2026.

2026	2027	2028	2029
at South Alabama	at Troy	West Florida	at TCU
North Alabama	at South Dakota State	at Oklahoma State	at West Florida
at Louisiana–Monroe	at Southern Miss		

== See also ==
- List of NCAA Division I FCS football programs
- List of Southeastern Louisiana Lions in the NFL draft
