= Amite City, Louisiana =

- Town
- Town of Amite City
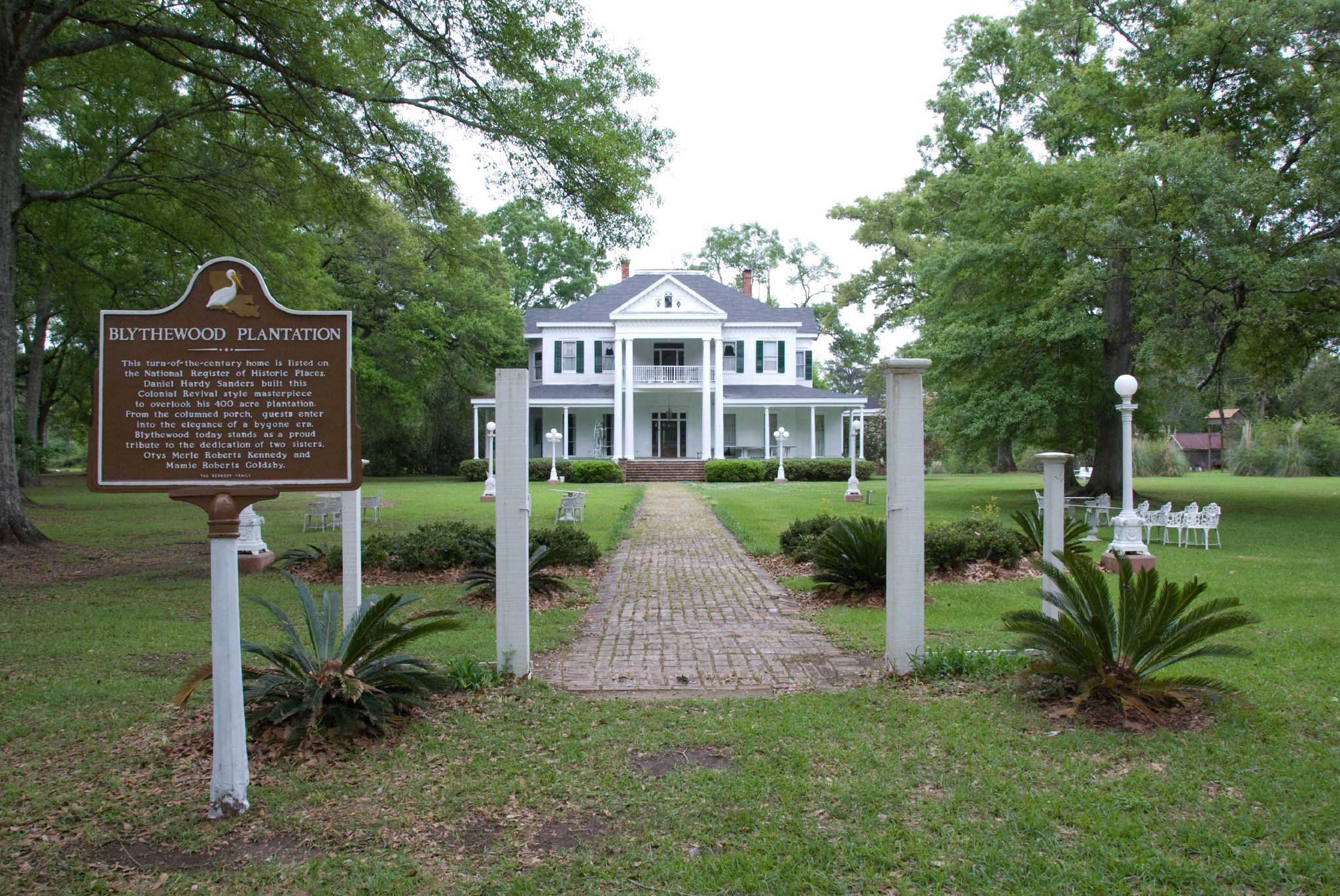
- Blythewood Plantation House

- Location of Amite City in Tangipahoa Parish, Louisiana.

- Location of Louisiana in the United States
- Coordinates: 30°43′43″N 90°30′31″W
- Country: United States
- State: Louisiana
- Parish: Tangipahoa
- Incorporated: March 7, 1861

Area
  - Total: 3.89 sq mi (10.08 km^{2})
  - Land: 3.88 sq mi (10.04 km^{2})
  - Water: 0.015 sq mi (0.04 km^{2})
- Elevation: 115 ft (35 m)

Population (2020)
  - Total: 4,005
  - Estimate (2024): 4,086 ▲
  - Density: 1,033.0/sq mi (398.83/km^{2})
- Time zone: UTC-6 (CST)
  - Summer (DST): UTC-5 (CDT)
- ZIP Code: 70422
- Area code: 985
- FIPS code: 22-01885
- GNIS feature ID: 2405148
- Website: www.townofamitecity.com

Amite City (/eɪˈmiːt/ ay-MEET or /eɪˈmɪt/ ay-MIT; commonly just Amite) is a town in and the parish seat of Tangipahoa Parish in southeastern Louisiana, United States. As of the 2020 census, Amite City had a population of 4,005. It is part of the Hammond MSA.

== History ==
The first European settlement, by French traders and colonists, developed on the banks of the Tangipahoa River, adjacent to a Choctaw village. Legend has it that the site was chosen when Choctaw Chief Baptiste welcomed the earliest settlers. Baptiste was the last Choctaw chief in the region. "Amite" has been said to be a Choctaw word for "red ant", signifying "thrift". It may also be derived from French, where amitié means "friendship."

The United States acquired what were known as the Florida Parishes in 1812. Anglo-American travelers are documented as entering Amite City as early as 1813.

In 1852 the New Orleans, Jackson, and Great Northern Railroad was chartered in both Louisiana and Mississippi. Two years later, the railroad was opened from New Orleans to the state line. Amite City was chosen as the practical stopping point, as it was halfway between Lake Pontchartrain to the south and the Mississippi state line that formed the northern border of the parish.

Amite City was chartered in 1855. The town was laid out, lots were sold and the community quickly began to grow. The Hotel Ponder at the "Amite Station" became a popular spot among travelers for dining and relaxing. In addition to becoming a major commercial center for a large region, Amite Station became a popular resort in the late 1850s. Many prosperous New Orleans residents established country retreats in the region to enjoy the natural beauty and escape unhealthy conditions in the low-lying city along the Mississippi. This trend intensified as seasonal epidemics of yellow fever continued to plague New Orleans in the mid-19th century.

On March 7, 1861, Amite City was incorporated as a town two months after the secession of Louisiana from the Union. During the war, Amite City served as an important gathering spot for Confederate officials involved in the supply and support of Camp Moore, the largest Confederate training base in Louisiana, located 10 miles to the north. Amite endured at least two visits by Union cavalry. In 1864 a brigade of Union infantry burned the railroad depot and destroyed the track from the depot to Camp Moore.

After the war, Amite City served as the base for Union troops occupying the region during Reconstruction. After the legislature established a new parish in 1869, soon to be named Tangipahoa, Amite City was selected as the parish seat. Five different buildings have served as the courthouse since 1870.

From the early 1870s through the first decade of the 20th century, Amite City played a central role in the violence that gained the parish the name "Bloody Tangipahoa." The turbulent political and economic conditions of the Reconstruction period and its aftermath sparked a number of vicious family feuds. Numerous duels and "bushwhacking" between whites occurred in the streets of Amite City and the countryside. In addition, white mobs lynched numerous blacks during this period. By the early 20th century, improved law enforcement brought some peace and better harmony to the area for some families, but blacks were excluded from political life.

Amite City continued to grow as a trading center for cotton planters and others. In 1869, the Gullet Gin Company opened in Amite City. The company was the largest producer of cotton gins in the south, employing more than 250 people by the early 20th century.

During World War II, the plant converted to war industry production, manufacturing 150 mm shells. The plant closed in 1963.

In the mid-20th century, family dairy farms began to replace cotton farms. Today, Tangipahoa Parish is the heart of Louisiana's dairy industry. It is also the primary producer of strawberries in the state. Amite City is a major oyster processing center and home of the Oyster Festival.

== Oyster Festival ==
Amite began hosting an annual Oyster Festival in 1976 due to the area’s oyster processing heritage. The first Amite Oyster Festival was held on March 20, 1976 at the Tangipahoa Parish Fairgrounds. Prominent events include: The Oyster Scavenger Hunt, Formal Gala, Parade, Chili Cook-Off, and Oyster Eating Competition.

== Geography ==
According to the United States Census Bureau, the town has a total area of 3.9 square miles (10 km^{2}), of which 3.8 square miles (9.8 km^{2}) is land and 0.04 square miles (0.10 km^{2}) (0.52%) is water.

=== Climate ===
Climate data for Amite City, Louisiana (1991–2020)
Month	Jan	Feb	Mar	Apr	May	Jun	Jul	Aug	Sep	Oct	Nov	Dec	Year
Mean daily maximum °F (°C)	61.1 (16.2)	64.8 (18.2)	72.3 (22.4)	78.2 (25.7)	85.2 (29.6)	89.8 (32.1)	90.9 (32.7)	91.6 (33.1)	89.0 (31.7)	80.5 (26.9)	70.3 (21.3)	62.8 (17.1)	78.0 (25.6)
Daily mean °F (°C)	49.8 (9.9)	53.3 (11.8)	60.3 (15.7)	66.1 (18.9)	73.7 (23.2)	79.4 (26.3)	81.1 (27.3)	81.3 (27.4)	77.7 (25.4)	67.8 (19.9)	57.9 (14.4)	51.4 (10.8)	66.6 (19.3)
Mean daily minimum °F (°C)	38.6 (3.7)	41.8 (5.4)	48.3 (9.1)	54.0 (12.2)	62.3 (16.8)	69.1 (20.6)	71.3 (21.8)	71.1 (21.7)	66.4 (19.1)	55.2 (12.9)	45.5 (7.5)	40.1 (4.5)	55.3 (12.9)
Average precipitation inches (mm)	5.93 (151)	5.02 (128)	5.22 (133)	5.09 (129)	6.36 (162)	5.88 (149)	6.46 (164)	6.60 (168)	3.62 (92)	4.34 (110)	3.83 (97)	5.45 (138)	63.8 (1,621)
Average snowfall inches (cm)	0.1 (0.25)	0.0 (0.0)	0.0 (0.0)	0.0 (0.0)	0.0 (0.0)	0.0 (0.0)	0.0 (0.0)	0.0 (0.0)	0.0 (0.0)	0.0 (0.0)	0.0 (0.0)	0.0 (0.0)	0.1 (0.25)
Source: NOAA

== Demographics ==
Historical population
Census	Pop.	Note	%±
1870	910		—
1880	1,120		23.1%
1890	1,510		34.8%
1900	1,547		2.5%
1910	1,677		8.4%
1920	1,854		10.6%
1930	2,536		36.8%
1940	2,499		−1.5%
1950	2,804		12.2%
1960	3,316		18.3%
1970	3,593		8.4%
1980	4,301		19.7%
1990	4,236		−1.5%
2000	4,110		−3.0%
2010	4,141		0.8%
2020	4,005		−3.3%
2025 (est.)	4,081	▲	1.9%
U.S. Decennial Census

=== 2020 census ===
As of the 2020 census, Amite City had a population of 4,005. The median age was 37.4 years. 19.3% of residents were under the age of 18 and 15.2% were 65 years of age or older. For every 100 females, there were 126.8 males, and for every 100 females age 18 and over, there were 133.3 males age 18 and over.

0.0% of residents lived in urban areas, while 100.0% lived in rural areas.

There were 1,187 households in Amite City, of which 34.2% had children under the age of 18 living in them. Of all households, 33.1% were married-couple households, 21.8% were households with a male householder and no spouse or partner present, and 39.9% were households with a female householder and no spouse or partner present. About 28.6% of all households were made up of individuals, and 13.3% had someone living alone who was 65 years of age or older.

There were 1,394 housing units, of which 14.8% were vacant. The homeowner vacancy rate was 2.0% and the rental vacancy rate was 5.8%.

Amite City racial composition as of 2020
Race	Number	Percentage
White (non-Hispanic)	1,625	40.57%
Black or African American (non-Hispanic)	2,180	54.43%
Native American	3	0.07%
Asian	28	0.7%
Other/Mixed	81	2.02%
Hispanic or Latino	88	2.2%

=== 2010 census ===
As of the 2010 census, there were 4,141 people, 1,310 households, and 810 families residing in the town. The population density was 1,066.2 inhabitants per square mile (411.7/km^{2}). There were 1,450 housing units at an average density of 376.1 per square mile (145.2/km^{2}). The racial makeup of the town was 43.59% White, 54.50% African American, 0.12% Native American, 0.56% Asian, 0.36% from other races, and 0.87% from two or more races. Hispanic or Latino of any race were 1.50% of the population.

There were 1,310 households, out of which 32.4% had children under the age of 18 living with them, 40.4% were married couples living together, 26.0% had a female householder with no husband present, and 29.3% were non-families. 26.6% of all households were made up of individuals, and 12.0% had someone living alone who was 65 years of age or older. The average household size was 2.66 and the average family size was 3.23.

In the town, the population was spread out, with 25.3% under the age of 18, 12.3% from 18 to 24, 28.0% from 25 to 44, 21.1% from 45 to 64, and 13.3% who were 65 years of age or older. The median age was 34 years. For every 100 females, there were 111.2 males. For every 100 females age 18 and over, there were 111.6 males.

=== Income and poverty ===
The median income for a household in the town was $27,011, and the median income for a family was $33,125. Males had a median income of $30,590 versus $19,063 for females. The per capita income for the town was $14,565. About 23.1% of families and 27.0% of the population were below the poverty line, including 39.3% of those under age 18 and 14.3% of those age 65 or over.

== Education ==
Tangipahoa Parish School Board operates three public schools in Amite:

- Amite High Magnet School
- West Side Middle School
- Amite Elementary School

Oak Forest Academy, a private school, also operates in Amite.

== Notable people ==
- Rusty Chambers, former NFL football player
- John Bel Edwards, 56th Governor of Louisiana
- Bolivar Edwards Kemp, Jr., Democratic Louisiana Attorney General from 1948 to 1952
- Bolivar Edwards Kemp, Sr., Democratic U.S. Representative
- Kevin Magee, basketball player in Europe
- Reggie Porter, former football player for Utah Utes
- Lloyd Pye, research coordinator of the Starchild Project; author
- Billy Reid, fashion designer
- Lester Ricard, football player for the Tulane Green Wave
- DeVonta Smith, football player, 2024 Super Bowl Champion with the Philadelphia Eagles and 2020 Heisman Trophy winner and 2018, 2020 FBS National Champion with the Alabama Crimson Tide
- Joanne Verger, Oregon legislator and first woman to serve as mayor of Coos Bay, Oregon
- Lavelle White ("Miss Lavelle"), American Texas blues and soul singer
- Harry D. Wilson, former state representative
- Karl Wilson, former NFL football player

== See also ==
- National Register of Historic Places listings in Tangipahoa Parish, Louisiana
