= Battle of Pennsylvania =

Battle of Pennsylvania may refer to:

- Eagles–Steelers rivalry, an American football rivalry between the Philadelphia Eagles and Pittsburgh Steelers
- Flyers–Penguins rivalry, an ice hockey rivalry between the Philadelphia Flyers and Pittsburgh Penguins
- Phillies–Pirates rivalry, a baseball rivalry between the Philadelphia Phillies and Pittsburgh Pirates

== See also ==
- Category:Battles in Pennsylvania
