= Sheetz–Wawa rivalry =

Rivalry between American gas station chains

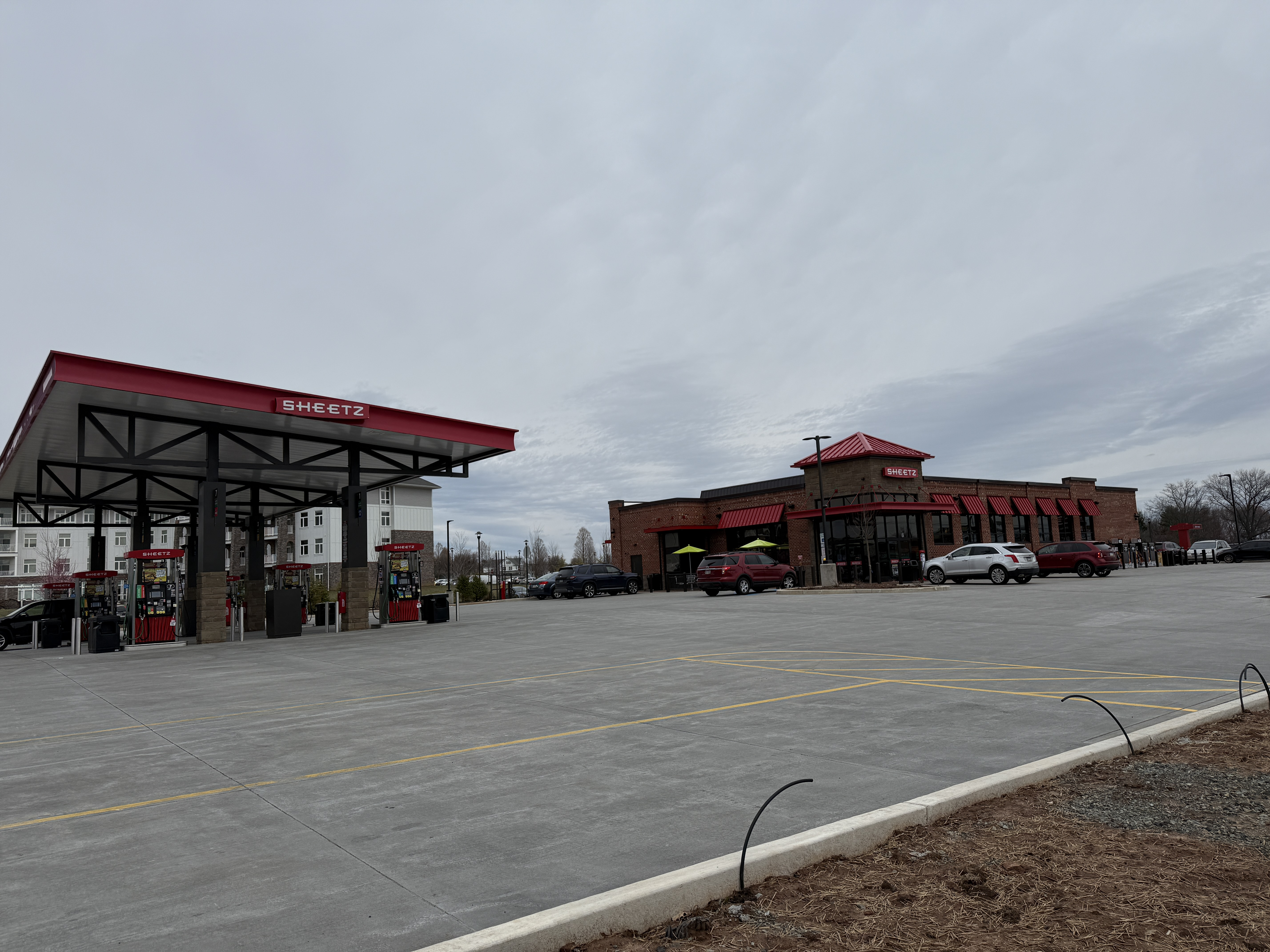
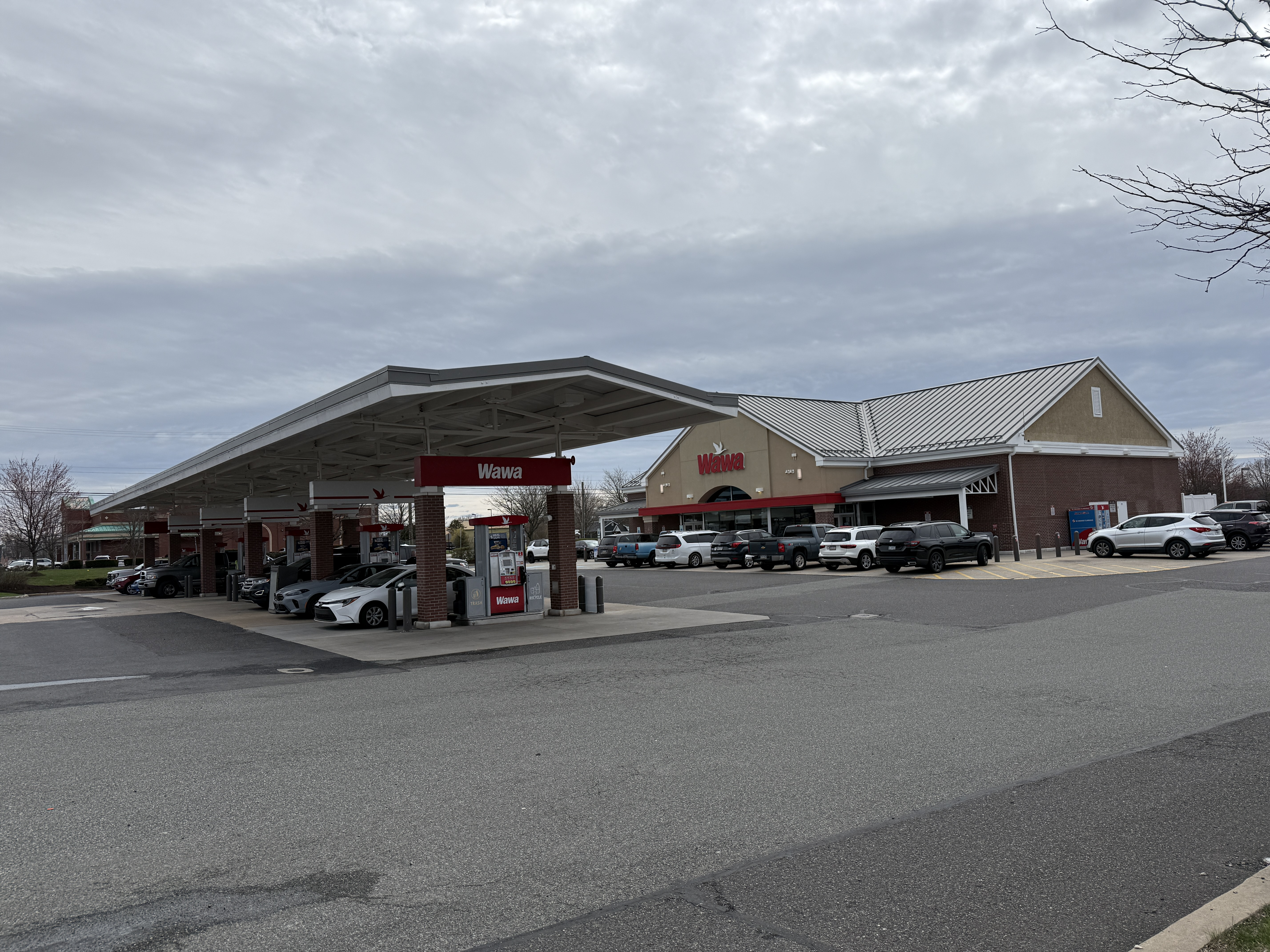
Sheetz and Wawa stores located across the street from each other in Limerick Township, Pennsylvania

In the U.S. state of Pennsylvania, the convenience store chains Sheetz and Wawa each have distinct and mostly non-overlapping territories. Sheetz stores are mostly located in the western and central parts of the state, while Wawa stores are primarily in the east. This division is apparent in the state's culture of regional identity, with many Pennsylvanians often preferring one store or the other. Pennsylvania state politicians have made public statements in support of their favorite store and even held campaign stops at their preferred convenience store chain.

== Origins ==
Map of Sheetz and Wawa store locations in Pennsylvania

Sheetz is headquartered in Altoona, Pennsylvania, while Wawa is based in its namesake community of Wawa, Pennsylvania. During the rise of self-service fuel stations in the 20th century, both companies added fuel service to already-existing food-service operations, in contrast to the more widespread addition of convenience stores to fuel stations. Sheetz, which started as a chain of dairy stores, added fuel service in 1973. Likewise, Wawa added fuel service to their existing food and beverage operations in 1994. Both chains receive high marks in consumer satisfaction, with Wawa being placed first and Sheetz fourth in the 2024 American Customer Satisfaction Index survey of convenience stores, outperforming some fast food chains.

Sheetz and Wawa have historically limited their operations to their respective regions: west and east, respectively. When a store opens near or across the traditional dividing line, it often makes local news, for instance in East Pennsboro Township, Middletown, Phoenixville, and State College. An urban legend posits that the two companies have a gentlemen's agreement not to intrude on each other's territory; however, the president of Wawa, Brian Schaller, stated in 2024 that no such agreement has ever existed.

== Cultural significance ==
The divide between fans of Sheetz and Wawa has been described as the "most heated food rivalry in the country". Among Pennsylvanians, the choice of convenience store is a cultural signifier of regional identity. The Spectator editor Teresa Mull described Sheetz as having a "cultural hegemony" in central Pennsylvania, and The New York Times political correspondent Trip Gabriel described its fans as having sworn "fealty" to the store. Likewise, Wawa fans—including Johnny Knoxville—have gotten tattoos of the store logo, demonstrating what Philadelphia magazine writer Don Steinberg called a "cult-like customer devotion".

State politicians in Pennsylvania often make public statements in support of and campaign stops at their preferred convenience store chain. In 2020, U.S. Representative Brendan Boyle and lieutenant governor John Fetterman wrote competing op-eds in The Philadelphia Inquirer arguing for the merits of Wawa and Sheetz, respectively. They engaged in a debate on the topic a year later. Some national politicians also take care to visit the convenience store of the region in which they are trying to earn votes. During the 2024 U.S. presidential election, the Kamala Harris campaign attempted to appeal to both Sheetz and Wawa voters; vice presidential nominee Tim Walz was rebuked by Eastern Pennsylvanians after mentioning having visited a Sheetz, while the campaign ran ads in Philadelphia with puns on the name "Wawa".

== See also ==
- Eagles–Steelers rivalry – National Football League cross-state rivalry in Pennsylvania
- Flyers–Penguins rivalry – National Hockey League rivalry
- Penn State–Pittsburgh football rivalry – American college football rivalry
- Phillies–Pirates rivalry – Major League Baseball in-state rivalry in Pennsylvania
