= Sheetz (surname) =

Sheetz is a surname found mainly in the United States. Notable people with the surname include:

- Chuck Sheetz, American director, animator, animation director, educator, and producer
- Herbert Sheetz (1882–1958), American college football coach
- Josef R. Sheetz (1895–1992), American military commander during World War II
- Michael Sheetz (1946–2025), American biochemist
- Steve Sheetz (1948–2026), Sheetz convenience stores executive

== See also ==
- For Marlana Sheetz, see American indie pop band Milo Greene
- Danni Leigh (born in 1970 as Michelle Sheetz), American country music singer
