= Steve Sheetz =

American businessman (1948–2026)

Stephen G. Sheetz
- Born: January 7, 1948; Altoona, Pennsylvania, U.S.
- Died: January 4, 2026 (aged 77); Altoona, Pennsylvania, U.S.
- Education: Penn State University
- Occupation: Businessman
- Known for: President & CEO of Sheetz
- Spouse: Nancy
- Children: 2

Stephen G. Sheetz (January 7, 1948 – January 4, 2026) was an American businessman and philanthropist. He was President and CEO of the Sheetz convenience store chain.

== Early life and education ==
Sheetz was born in Altoona, Pennsylvania, on January 7, 1948. He graduated from Altoona Area High School and then later from Penn State University in 1969.

== Career ==
Sheetz's brother Bob had founded the chain in 1952 by purchasing one of his father's dairy stores in Altoona. Steve Sheetz was hired part-time by his brother in 1961. He joined the business full time as general manager in 1969, when the chain had three stores. Together they plotted to expand the chain, targeting seven stores by 1972. In fact, by 1972 they had opened 14 stores. Then, in 1973, they added gas pumps, the first self-serve gasoline in central Pennsylvania.

As of 1983, the chain had 100 stores. Stephen Sheetz became President and CEO of Sheetz in 1984 when his brother Bob retired.

In 1995, Steve Sheetz became board president when his nephew, Stan Sheetz, became president of the company. In 2013, Stan Sheetz became chair of the board and Stephen Sheetz's nephew Joe S. Sheetz became president and CEO.

Over the course of his life, Sheetz donated significant amounts of money to Penn State Altoona, establishing the Sheetz Fellows Program and the Sheetz Center for Entrepreneurial Excellence.

== Personal life ==
Sheetz and his wife, Nancy, had two daughters.

Sheetz died at UPMC Altoona on January 4, 2026, at the age of 77, due to pneumonia while fighting a long-term leukemia diagnosis.
