= Eagles–Steelers rivalry =

National Football League cross-state rivalry in Pennsylvania

- Philadelphia Eagles Pittsburgh Steelers
- Location: Philadelphia, Pittsburgh
- First meeting: November 19, 1933; Eagles 25, Steelers 6
- Latest meeting: November 22, 2026; Eagles 19, Steelers 16
- Next meeting: 2028
- Stadiums: Eagles: Lincoln Financial Field; Steelers: Acrisure Stadium

Statistics
- Total meetings: 83
- All-time series: Eagles: 51–29–3
- Regular season series: Eagles: 50–29–3
- Postseason results: Eagles: 1–0
- Largest victory: Eagles: 45–3 (1942); Steelers: 31–0 (1959)
- Most points scored: Eagles: 47 (1965); Steelers: 38 (2020)
- Longest win streak: Eagles: 7 (1947–1950); Steelers: 4 (1936–1937)
- Current win streak: Eagles: 3 (2022–present)

Post–season history
- 1947 NFL Eastern Division Championship: Eagles won: 21–0

The Eagles–Steelers rivalry is a National Football League (NFL) rivalry between the Philadelphia Eagles and Pittsburgh Steelers. Historically a significant in-state matchup between the two NFL teams located in Pennsylvania, the rivalry has been marked by its infrequent matchups due to its interconference nature, which has been cited as a reason for its low intensity.

The rivalry is one of the oldest in the NFL, dating back to 1933. During the first three decades of the rivalry, the Steelers and Eagles were in the NFL's Eastern Division and played twice annually. As a result of the AFL–NFL merger, the Steelers were placed in the AFC Central, while the Eagles were placed in the NFC East, resulting in infrequent meetings, as the teams have only met 12 times since 1970. Under the current NFL scheduling formula, the teams play each other at least once every four years and once every eight seasons at each team's home stadium, when the AFC North and NFC East play one another. However, with a new 17-game schedule being introduced in 2021, it is now possible for the two teams to meet as often as every other year, depending on division placement and scheduling made two years ago. The teams last played in 2024, a 27–13 Eagles win in Philadelphia.

The rivalry is one of two the Steelers have with NFC East teams, the other being their rivalry with the Dallas Cowboys. Much like other rivalries between Philadelphia and Pittsburgh, the rivalry is mostly fueled by the two cities being within Pennsylvania and their sociocultural differences, with Philadelphia and the neighboring Lehigh Valley and Wyoming Valley being part of the Northeast megalopolis while Pittsburgh and Western Pennsylvania in general being part of the Rust Belt and Appalachia. The rivalry has been unofficially nicknamed the "Battle of Pennsylvania", the "PA Turnpike Showdown" (referencing the Pennsylvania Turnpike, which connects the cities of Pittsburgh and Philadelphia), and the "Pennsylvania State Championship" (a nickname coined by Steelers head coach Mike Tomlin in 2024).

As the two teams are in different conferences, the only way they can currently meet in the playoffs is if they both make it to the Super Bowl. While this has never occurred, both teams have made it to their respective Conference Championship Game in 2001, 2004, and 2008, with Philadelphia advancing to the Super Bowl in 2004 and Pittsburgh winning it in 2008.

The Eagles lead the overall series, 51–29–3. The two teams have met once in the playoffs, with the Eagles winning.

== History ==
=== Early years ===
Both teams were officially founded in 1933, with the Steelers then being known as the Pittsburgh Pirates. However, their histories predate that, with the Steelers being known as the J.P. Rooneys dating to 1921 as a semipro team, while the Eagles are arguably descended from the Frankford Yellow Jackets based in Philadelphia's Frankford neighborhood dating to 1899. The NFL considers both teams having started in 1933 alongside the now-defunct Cincinnati Reds. Both teams took advantage of Pennsylvania relaxing their blue laws in 1933 that previously didn't allow sporting events on Sundays, when most NFL games took place. The blue laws, combined with general issues related to The Great Depression, were among the reasons the Yellow Jackets failed despite winning the NFL championship in 1926.

The first meeting between the teams was on November 19, with the Eagles winning, 25–6. The two teams would struggle their first decade in the NFL both on the field and financially, with the Steelers staying afloat mostly due to team founder Art Rooney's gambling habits. Eventually, in late 1940 Rooney sold the Steelers to Alexis Thompson, a 26-year-old steel heir from Boston frequently described in the press as "a well-heeled New York City playboy". Thompson planned to move the franchise to Boston and play games in Fenway Park. Eagles owner Bert Bell brokered the deal between Rooney and Thompson for $160,000, and Rooney used $80,000 of the proceeds to buy a partnership in the Eagles, which at the time was owned by Bell. The deal also involved the trade of several players between the two teams.

The two owners planned to field a combined Philadelphia-Pittsburgh team called the Pennsylvania Keystoners that would play home games in both cities. The original proposition was that Thompson would buy the franchise and take the Pittsburgh club to Boston and Bell and Rooney would pool their interests in the Eagles to form a Philadelphia-Pittsburgh club, splitting the home games between Forbes Field in Pittsburgh and Philadelphia's Municipal Stadium. Thompson, however, was unable to secure a place to play in Boston. After meeting with Rooney, plans changed whereby Thompson's club (ostensibly the former Steelers) would play in Philadelphia as the Eagles, while the Rooney-Bell owned team would play in Pittsburgh as the Steelers, effectively trading the two clubs between their cities.

=== Steagles and post-war activity ===
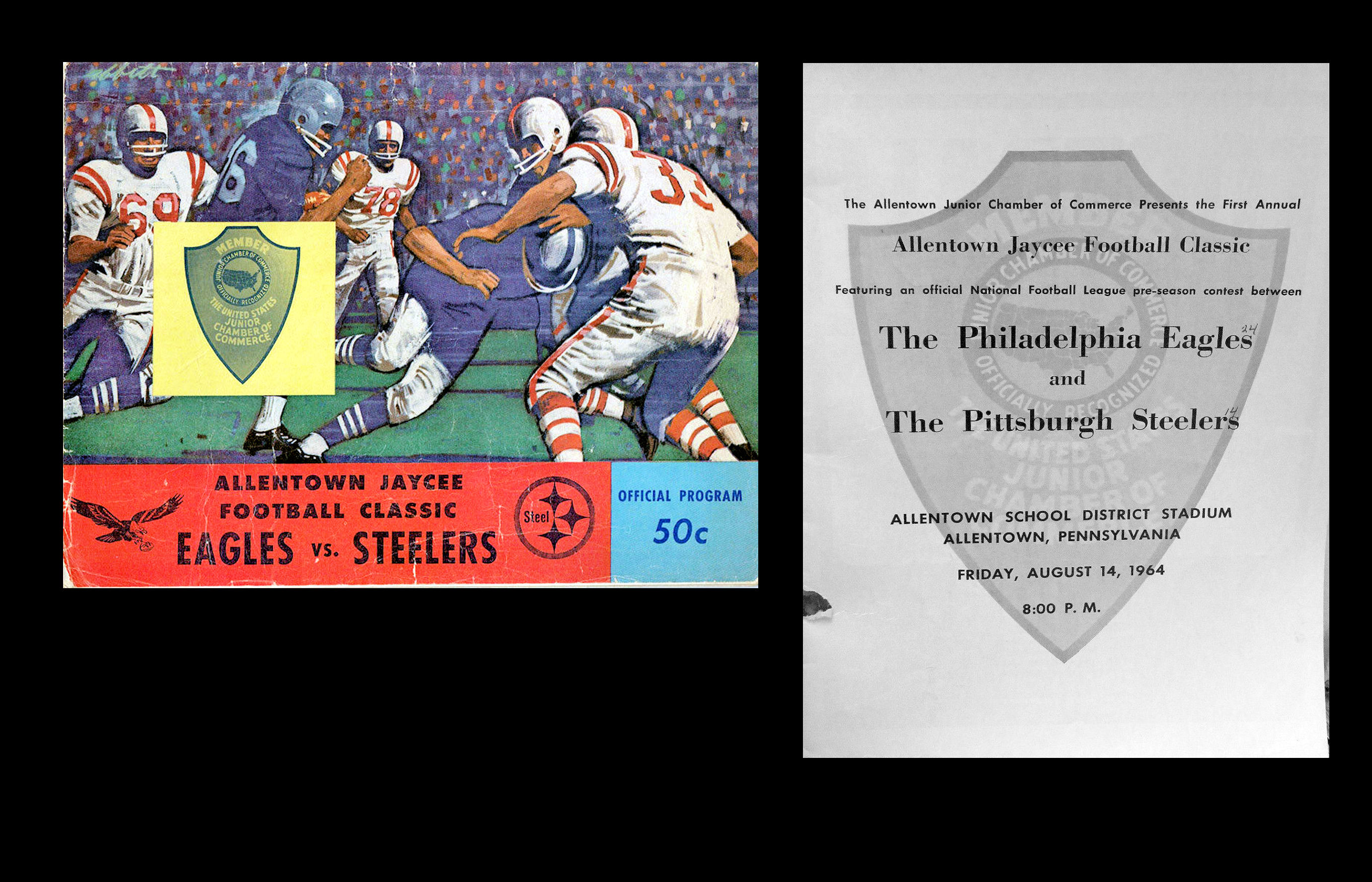
Program for the Eagles–Steelers' 1964 preseason game in Allentown

The notion for a single team between the two cities was revived, when for one season in 1943, forced to do so by player shortfalls brought on by World War II, the two clubs temporarily merged as the Philadelphia-Pittsburgh "Steagles". The league only approved the merger for one year; Pittsburgh was willing to merge again for 1944 but not Philadelphia. This forced the Steelers to merge with the Chicago Cardinals (as Card-Pitt) for 1944.

Following the end of the war, both teams' fortunes changed, with the Eagles and Steelers both clinching playoff spots in the late 1940s, including their only postseason meeting to date in 1947, when the Eagles shut out the Steelers 21–0 at Forbes Field. It would be the Steelers only playoff appearance until the Immaculate Reception 25 years later. The Eagles, under head coach Greasy Neale, won NFL championships in 1948 and 1949.

During the 1950s and 1960s, both teams success and failures would be relative to one another, to the point that both teams would be "competing" for the worst record in the NFL in 1968 and the chance to draft O. J. Simpson. Ultimately, the Atlanta Falcons had the NFL's worst record and the Buffalo Bills of the American Football League would win out on what was at that point the common draft. The Eagles, drafting third, would select Leroy Keyes while the Steelers, drafting fourth, would draft relative unknown Joe Greene. New Steelers head coach Chuck Noll would say later that the team would've drafted Greene even if it had the first overall pick, while Keyes (like Simpson a running back) was viewed by Eagles fans as more of a "consolation prize". Ultimately (Simpson's successful NFL career aside), Keyes lasted five years in the NFL; Greene would become a key member of the Steel Curtain defense and is now a member of the Pro Football Hall of Fame and one of two Steelers to have their number officially retired.

== Season-by-season results ==
Philadelphia Eagles vs. Pittsburgh Pirates/Steelers Season-by-Season Results
1930s (Steelers, 7–6)

Season	Season series	at Philadelphia Eagles	at Pittsburgh Pirates	Overall series	Notes
1933	Eagles 1–0	Eagles; 25–6	no game	Eagles; 1–0	Eagles and Pirates join the National Football League (NFL) as expansion teams. They were placed in the NFL Eastern Division.
1934	Tie 1–1	Pirates; 9–7	Eagles; 17–0	Eagles; 2–1	
1935	Tie 1–1	Pirates; 17–7	Eagles; 17–6	Eagles; 3–2	
1936	Pirates 2–0	Pirates; 6–0	Pirates; 17–0	Pirates; 4–3	Eagles move to Philadelphia Municipal Stadium (now known as John F. Kennedy Stadium).
1937	Pirates 2–0	no games	Pirates; 27–14	Pirates; 6–3	
1937	Pirates 2–0	no games	Pirates; 16–7	Pirates; 6–3	
1938	Eagles 2–0	Eagles; 14–7	Eagles; 27–7	Pirates; 6–5	
1939	Tie 1–1	Eagles; 17–14	Pirates; 24–12	Pirates; 7–6	Game in Philadelphia was played on Thanksgiving. Both teams' wins against one another were their only wins in their 1939 season. Pirates won their final game of the season to avoid finishing the season without a win. Final season Pirates played under the "Pirates" name.

1940s (Eagles, 12–4–1)

Season	Season series	at Philadelphia Eagles	at Pittsburgh Steelers	Overall series	Notes
1940	Tie 1–1	Eagles; 7–0	Steelers; 7–3	Steelers; 8–7	Pirates rename themselves to the "Pittsburgh Steelers". Eagles move to Shibe Park/Connie Mack Stadium. Game in Philadelphia was played on Thanksgiving. Eagles snapped an 11-game losing streak with their win, which was their first and only win in the 1940 season.
1941	Eagles 1–0–1	Tie; 7–7	Eagles; 10–7	Tie; 8–8–1	Eagles' win snapped their 12-game road losing streak.
1942	Tie 1–1	Steelers; 14–0	Eagles; 24–14	Tie; 9–9–1	Eagles' win is their only road win in the 1942 season.
1945	Eagles 2–0	Eagles; 30–6	Eagles; 45–3	Eagles; 11–9–1	Eagles and Steelers did not meet head-to-head in the 1943 and 1944 seasons due to both teams losing players to World War II. Consequently, the Steelers temporarily merged with the Eagles in 1943, adopting the name "Steagles". In 1944, the Steelers temporarily merged with the Chicago Cardinals, adopting the name "Card-Pitt," and weren't scheduled to meet against the Eagles.
1946	Tie 1–1	Eagles; 10–7	Steelers; 10–7	Eagles; 12–10–1	
1947	Tie 1–1	Eagles; 21–0	Steelers; 35–24	Eagles; 13–11–1	Both teams finished with 8–4 records, setting up a tiebreaker Eastern Division playoff match.
1947 playoffs	Eagles 1–0		Eagles 21–0	Eagles 14–11–1	Eastern Division Championship. First postseason matchup between two Pennsylvania-based professional sports teams. Eagles go on to lose 1947 NFL Championship Game.
1948	Eagles 2–0	Eagles; 17–0	Eagles; 34–7	Eagles; 16–11–1	Eagles win 1948 NFL Championship.
1949	Eagles 2–0	Eagles; 34–17	Eagles; 38–7	Eagles; 18–11–1	Eagles win 1949 NFL Championship.

1950s (Eagles, 12–8)

Season	Season series	at Philadelphia Eagles	at Pittsburgh Steelers	Overall series	Notes
1950	Tie 1–1	Steelers; 9–7	Eagles; 17–10	Eagles; 19–12–1	As a result of the AAFC–NFL merger, the Eagles and Steelers were placed in the NFL American Conference (later renamed to the NFL Eastern Conference in the 1953 season). Eagles win seven straight meetings (1947–1950), currently the longest win streak by either team in the rivalry.
1951	Tie 1–1	Steelers; 17–13	Eagles; 34–13	Eagles; 20–13–1	
1952	Eagles 2–0	Eagles; 26–21	Eagles; 31–25	Eagles; 22–13–1	
1953	Eagles 2–0	Eagles; 23–7	Eagles; 35–7	Eagles; 24–13–1	
1954	Tie 1–1	Eagles; 24–22	Steelers; 17–7	Eagles; 25–14–1	
1955	Tie 1–1	Eagles; 24–0	Steelers; 13–7	Eagles; 26–15–1	
1956	Eagles 2–0	Eagles; 14–7	Eagles; 35–21	Eagles; 28–15–1	
1957	Tie 1–1	Eagles; 7–6	Steelers; 6–0	Eagles; 29–16–1	Last matchup at Shibe Park/Connie Mack Stadium.
1958	Steelers 2–0	Steelers; 26–24	Steelers; 23–7	Eagles; 29–18–1	Eagles move to Franklin Field. Steelers' first season series sweep against the Eagles since the 1937 season.
1959	Tie 1–1	Eagles; 28–24	Steelers; 31–0	Eagles; 30–19–1	

1960s (Eagles, 10–5–2)

Season	Season series	at Philadelphia Eagles	at Pittsburgh Steelers	Overall series	Notes
1960	Tie 1–1	Eagles; 34–7	Steelers; 27–21	Eagles; 31–20–1	Eagles win 1960 NFL Championship.
1961	Eagles 2–0	Eagles; 21–16	Eagles; 35–24	Eagles; 33–20–1	
1962	Steelers 2–0	Steelers; 26–17	Steelers; 13–7	Eagles; 33–22–1	
1963	Tie 0–0–2	Tie; 21–21	Tie; 20–20	Eagles; 33–22–3	Last matchup at Forbes Field.
1964	Eagles 2–0	Eagles; 21–7	Eagles; 34–10	Eagles; 35–22–3	Steelers move to Pitt Stadium.
1965	Tie 1–1	Steelers; 20–14	Eagles; 47–13	Eagles; 36–23–3	As of November 22, 2026, this remains the Steelers' last victory in Philadelphia.
1966	Eagles 2–0	Eagles; 27–23	Eagles; 31–14	Eagles; 38–23–3	Last season in which both teams met twice annually.
1967	Eagles 1–0	Eagles; 34–24	no game	Eagles; 39–23–3	As a result of expansion, the two eight-team divisions became two eight-team conferences split into two divisions. The Eagles were placed in the NFL Capitol, but the Steelers were placed in the NFL Century, resulting in no longer being divisional rivals.
1968	Steelers 1–0	no game	Steelers; 6–3	Eagles; 39–24–3	Last matchup at Pitt Stadium.
1969	Eagles 1–0	Eagles; 34–24	no game	Eagles; 40–24–3	Starting with the Eagles' win, the Steelers began a 16-game losing streak.

1970s (Eagles, 2–1)

Season	Results	Location	Overall series	Notes
1970	Eagles; 30–20	Franklin Field	Eagles; 41–24–3	As a result of the AFL–NFL merger, the Eagles were placed in the National Football Conference (NFC), but the Steelers were placed in the American Football Conference (AFC). Consequently, these teams now face each other in the regular season once every four years. Steelers open Three Rivers Stadium. Steelers' RB Frenchy Fuqua rushed for 218 yards, setting a franchise record for most rushing yards in a game by a player (broken by Willie Parker in 2006). Game was Eagles last game at Franklin Field, as they opened Veterans Stadium the following season.
1974	Steelers; 27–0	Three Rivers Stadium	Eagles; 41–25–3	Steelers win Super Bowl IX.
1979	Eagles; 17–14	Veterans Stadium	Eagles; 42–25–3	Eagles' win snapped the Steelers' 12 game winning streak dating back to the previous season, setting a franchise record for their longest win streak (broken in 2004–2005). Steelers win Super Bowl XIV.

1980s (Eagles, 1–0)

Season	Results	Location	Overall series	Notes
1982	canceled	Three Rivers Stadium	N/A	Due to the 1982 NFL players strike, the game was canceled.
1988	Eagles; 27–26	Three Rivers Stadium	Eagles; 43–25–3	

1990s (Eagles, 2–1)

Season	Results	Location	Overall series	Notes
1991	Eagles; 23–14	Veterans Stadium	Eagles; 44–25–3	
1994	Steelers; 14–3	Three Rivers Stadium	Eagles; 44–26–3	
1997	Eagles; 23–20	Veterans Stadium	Eagles; 45–26–3	

2000s (Eagles, 2–1)

Season	Results	Location	Overall series	Notes
2000	Eagles; 26–23(OT)	Three Rivers Stadium	Eagles; 46–26–3	First game in the rivalry to go to overtime. Eagles overcame a 23–13 deficit in the final 4 minutes, which included a successful onside kick that allowed them to score the game-tying field goal at the end of regulation. They then scored the game-winning field goal on their first possession of overtime. Last matchup at Three Rivers Stadium, as the Steelers opened Heinz Field (now known as Acrisure Stadium) the following season. Most recent victory for the away team in the series.
2004	Steelers; 27–3	Heinz Field	Eagles; 46–27–3	First matchup at Heinz Field (now known as Acrisure Stadium). Steelers hand the Eagles their first loss of the season after a 7–0 start. Steelers lose AFC Championship Game, preventing an all-Pennsylvania Super Bowl matchup. Eagles lose Super Bowl XXXIX.
2008	Eagles; 15–6	Lincoln Financial Field	Eagles; 47–27–3	Eagles lose NFC Championship Game, preventing an all-Pennsylvania Super Bowl matchup. Steelers win Super Bowl XLIII.

2010s (Tie, 1–1)

Season	Results	Location	Overall series	Notes
2012	Steelers; 16–14	Heinz Field	Eagles; 47–28–3	
2016	Eagles; 34–3	Lincoln Financial Field	Eagles; 48–28–3	

2020s (Eagles, 3–1)

Season	Results	Location	Overall series	Notes
2020	Steelers; 38–29	Heinz Field	Eagles; 48–29–3	
2022	Eagles; 35–13	Lincoln Financial Field	Eagles; 49–29–3	Eagles lose Super Bowl LVII.
2024	Eagles; 27–13	Lincoln Financial Field	Eagles; 50–29–3	Eagles' win increased their winning streak to 10, setting a franchise record for the longest winning streak. Eagles win Super Bowl LIX.
2026	Eagles; 19–16	Lincoln Financial Field	Eagles; 51–29–3	Eagles win twelve straight home meetings (1966–present).

Summary of Results

Season	Season series	at Philadelphia Eagles	at Pittsburgh Steelers	Notes
Regular season	Eagles 50–29–3	Eagles 31–9–2	Steelers 20–19–1	
Postseason	Eagles 1–0	no games	Eagles 1–0	NFL Eastern Division Championship: 1947
Regular and postseason	Eagles 51–29–3	Eagles 31–9–2	Tie 20–20–1	

== See also ==
- List of NFL rivalries
- Flyers–Penguins rivalry
- Phillies–Pirates rivalry
- Sheetz–Wawa rivalry
