= Sheetz =

American retail chain

Sheetz, Inc.

- Sheetz store in Fletcher, North Carolina
- Type: Private
- Industry: Convenience stores Fast food restaurant Gas stations Truck stops
- Founded: 1952; 74 years ago
- Headquarters: Altoona, Pennsylvania, United States
- Number of locations: 800+ (2025)
- Areas served: Indiana (planned), Maryland, Michigan, North Carolina, Ohio, Pennsylvania, Virginia and West Virginia
- Key people: Travis R. Sheetz (president & CEO); Stanton R. Sheetz (chairman); Joseph S. Sheetz (vice chairman)
- Products: Made-to-order foods, prepared foods, coffee, motor vehicle fuel, beer, and wine
- Revenue: ▲US$7.2 billion (FY2021)
- Owner: Sheetz family and employees
- Number of employees: 25,000 (FY 2023)
- Website: sheetz.com

Sheetz, Inc. is an American chain of convenience stores. Its stores, which are open 24/7 year-round, offer made-to-order fast food, and most include a gas station, while a few locations are full-scale truck stops, offering showers and a laundromat. The family-owned company has over 21,000 employees, and operates more than 800 company-owned stores located in Western, Central, and Northeastern Pennsylvania, West Virginia, Maryland, Ohio, Virginia, North Carolina, and Michigan as of 2025.

Sheetz is the dominant convenience store chain in Pennsylvania, holding a virtual monopoly in its native Altoona, and a commanding share of the Pittsburgh, Harrisburg, and Wyoming Valley markets. It is noticeably absent from most of the Philadelphia metropolitan area due to the presence of competitor Wawa, leading to a fierce "rivalry" between the two chains among Pennsylvanians. However, the two companies themselves have a friendly relationship.

== History ==
=== 1952–1995 ===
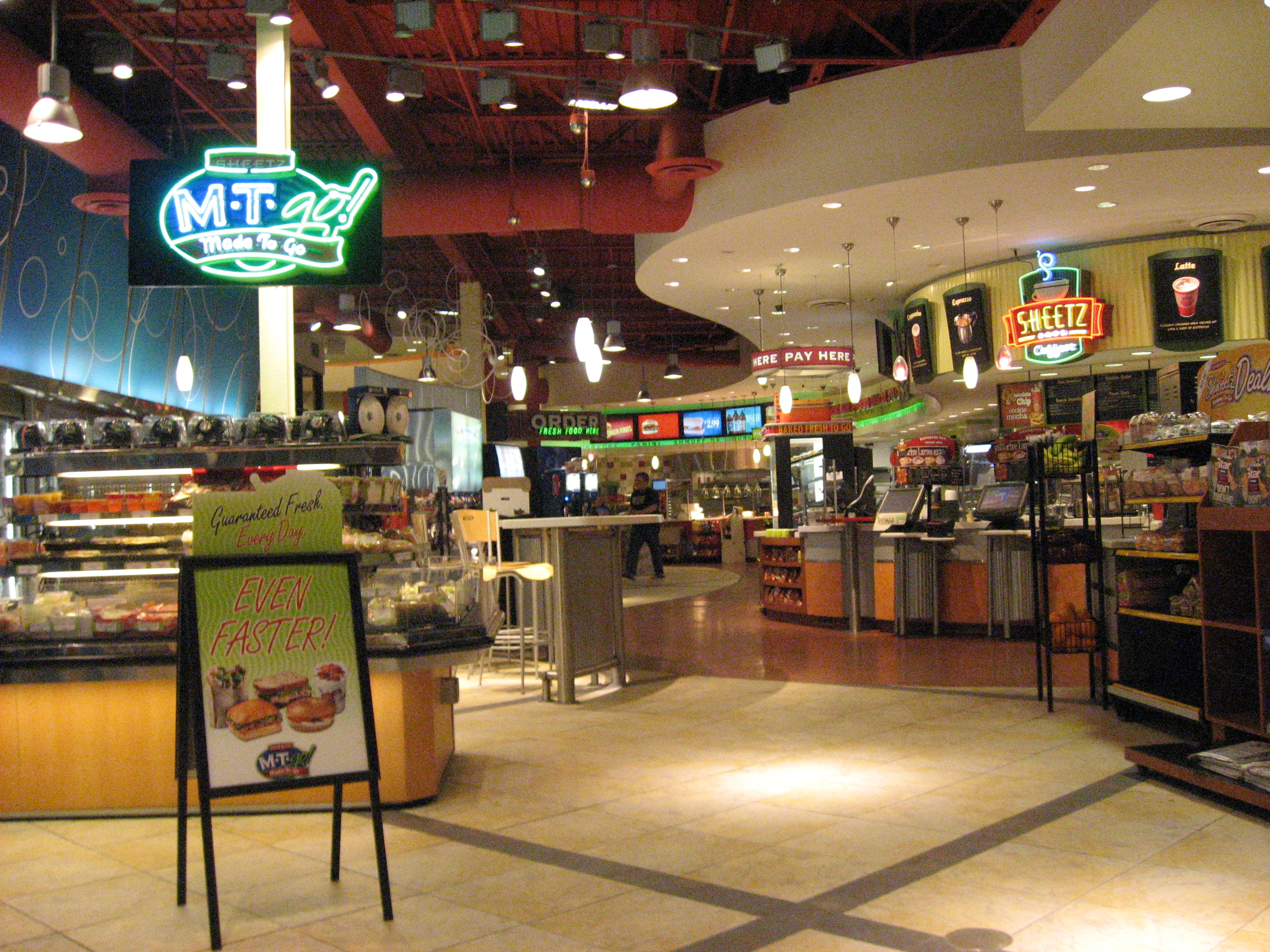
Interior of a Super Sheetz in Altoona, Pennsylvania

Sheetz, Inc. was founded by G. Robert "Bob" Sheetz in 1952 when he purchased one of his father's five dairy stores located in Altoona. In 1961, Bob hired his brother Steve to work part-time.

In 1963, the company opened its second store under the name "Sheetz Kwik Shopper." A third store followed in 1967. In 1969, Steve became general manager. The brothers planned to expand at the rate of one store per year with a target of seven stores by 1972. In 1972, the company expanded from seven to fourteen stores. One year later, Sheetz began selling gasoline and opened the first self-serve gas pumps in central Pennsylvania. The first Sheetz store outside Pennsylvania opened in Maryland in 1976.

In 1983, Bob retired and Steve became president. By 1983, Bob and Steve had opened 100 stores. At that time, the "Kwik Shopper" in "Sheetz Kwik Shopper" was removed.

=== 1995–2013 ===
R. "Stan" Sheetz, Bob's son, became president. Steve assumed the position of chairman of the board in 1995. To this day, Sheetz maintains a family business with four family members serving on the executive committee.

During the mid-1990s, the chain discontinued It! Cola, its private-label brand of soft drinks. The drink was available in cans, bottles, and as a fountain drink, all of which were replaced by Pepsi products. The chain has both Pepsi and Coca-Cola in its fountains. In 1997, the company resumed store expansion, expanding into Ohio by opening a location in the Youngstown area along I-80 in Weathersfield Township, just east of Girard. At that time, the company introduced touchscreen ordering. Shortly afterwards, the chain expanded into North Carolina. In September 2001, Sheetz opened a distribution center in Claysburg, Pennsylvania. In May 2005, Sheetz began offering their new MasterCard PayPass with RFID technology, and was one of the first retailers to accept such technology, ahead of McDonald's, Arby's, CVS, and rival 7-Eleven, all of which introduced it nationally in 2014.

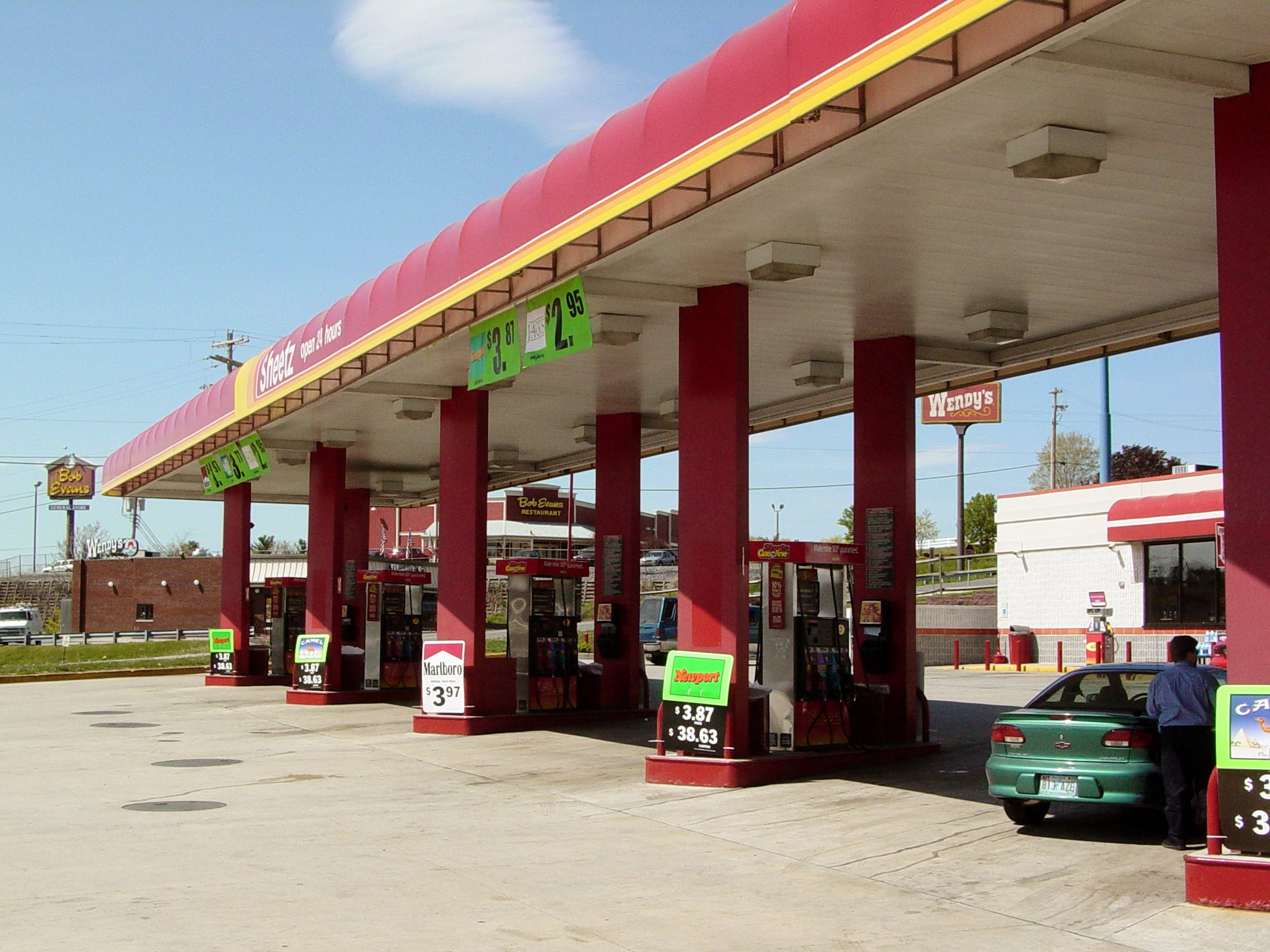
A Sheetz fuel canopy in Breezewood, Pennsylvania southeast of Altoona

Sheetz became Pennsylvania's second retail chain to offer E85 ethanol-based fuel alternatives at select stations on July 10, 2006. In 2008, Sheetz opened its first commissary, Sheetz Bros. Kitchen, to produce fresh sandwiches and bakery products sold at Sheetz locations.

Sheetz gained national attention in 2011 when it served as a major sponsor for Morgan Spurlock's film POM Wonderful Presents: The Greatest Movie Ever Sold. Sheetz actively promoted the film in stores, including selling collector cups. Further, Altoona even temporarily changed its name to "POM Wonderful Presents: The Greatest Movie Ever Sold, Pennsylvania" for $25,000. The name change was merely ceremonial, as the United States Board of Geographic Names did not legally change it, and the United States Postal Service did not recognize it.

=== 2013–present ===
In October 2013, Stan Sheetz became chairman of the board of Sheetz, and his cousin Joseph S. "Joe" Sheetz became president and CEO. Joe Sheetz remained president until 2018, when his brother Travis Sheetz was named president and chief operating officer, the first COO in the company’s history. Joe Sheetz continued as CEO until January 2022, when he became executive vice chairman and Travis Sheetz assumed the roles of president and CEO.

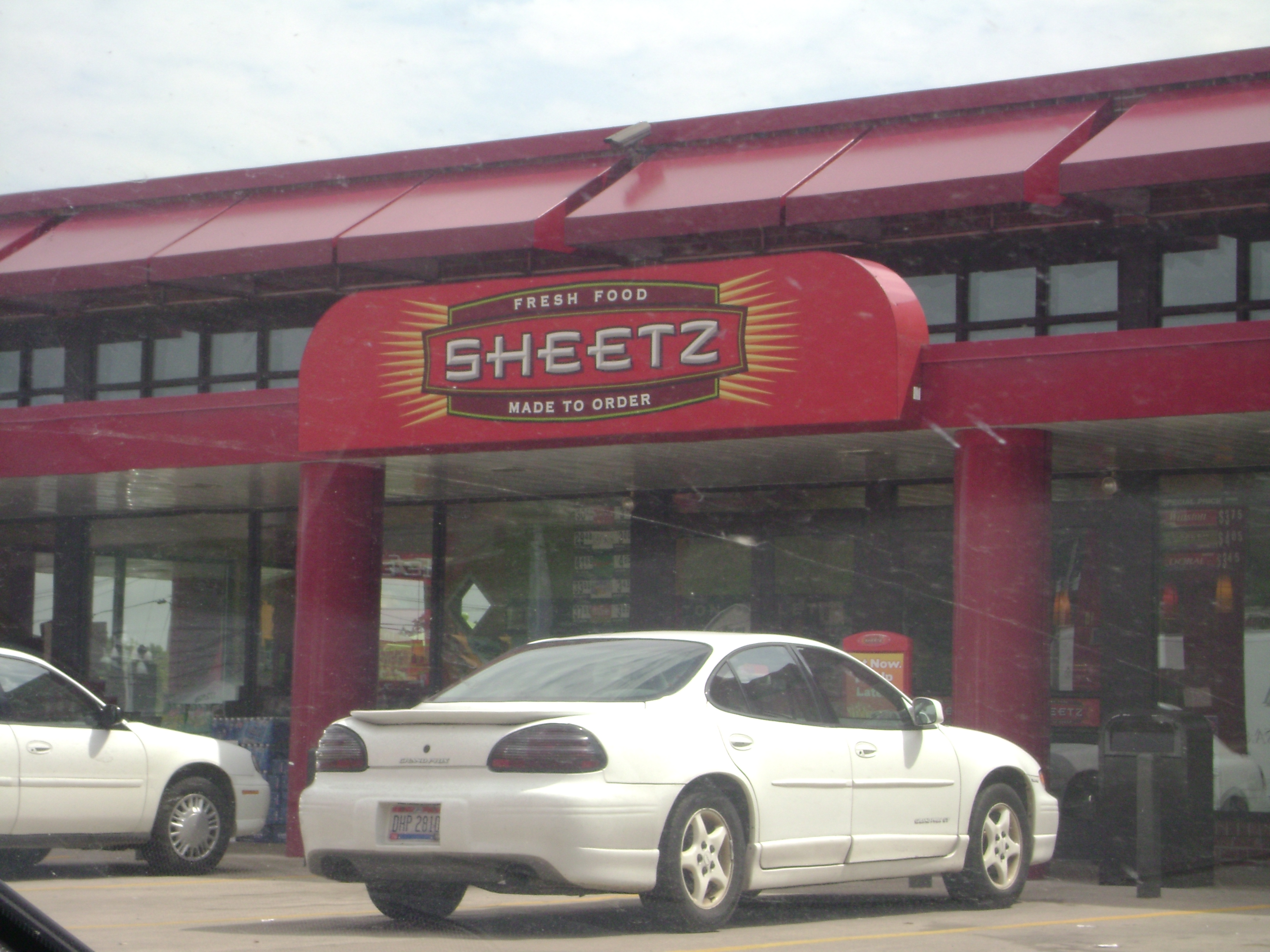
A Sheetz location in Kent, Ohio east of Akron

In 2014, Sheetz opened its second distribution center and kitchen facility in Burlington, North Carolina. Sales for fiscal year 2018–2019 totaled $7.5 billion. In 2019, Sheetz opened an IT tech center in Pittsburgh's Bakery Square complex, serving as a secondary headquarters for the company. They later expanded the space in 2023. On December 19, 2019, Sheetz celebrated the opening of its 600th store in Shaler Township, PA.

In April 2024, the Equal Employment Opportunity Commission sued Sheetz. The EEOC alleged that Sheetz's usage of criminal background checks in screening job applicants resulted in a disproportionate impact on black, Native American, and multiracial applicants. The EEOC moved to have the lawsuit dropped in June 2025.

In June 2024, Sheetz entered a sponsorship deal with the Pittsburgh Pirates, adding their logo to the sleeves of Pirates jerseys. The Pirates' Double-A affiliate, the Altoona Curve, are in Sheetz's home city.

=== 2020s expansions ===
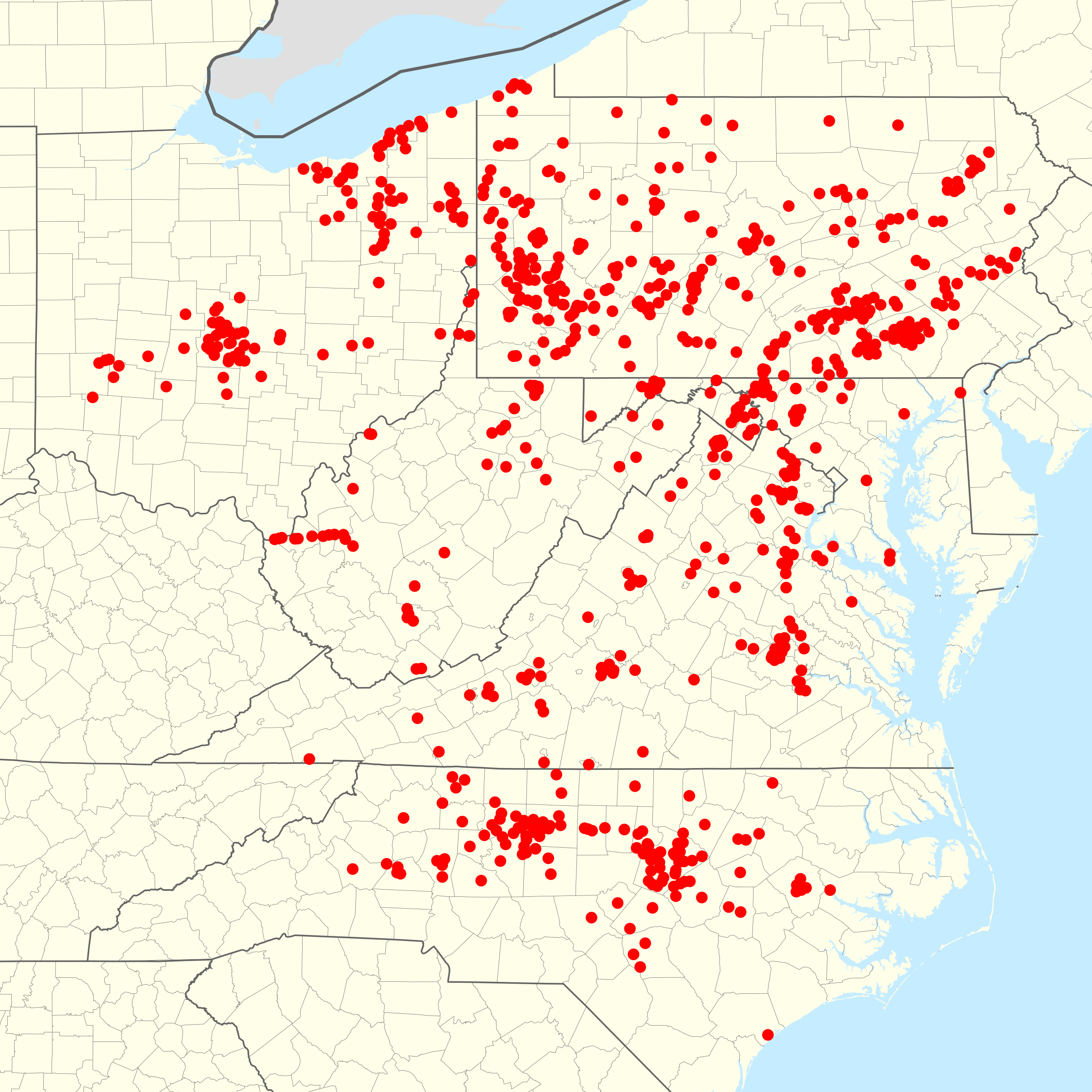
Map of Sheetz locations as of July 2024, prior to the chain's expansion into Michigan.

Sheetz announced in November 2019 that the chain would expand into Greater Columbus starting in 2021, with plans to open 60 locations in the region by 2025, more than doubling its existing store count in Ohio. The first two stores opened in Delaware, Ohio in April 2021, after many social media requests from transplants now living in the area asking for Sheetz according to Travis Sheetz.

After the chain's successful expansion into the Columbus market in April 2022, Sheetz announced an expansion into the Dayton, Ohio market beginning in 2024. The move will put Sheetz up head-to-head with Casey's for the first time, while also competing with Speedway, Circle K, and United Dairy Farmers in the market.

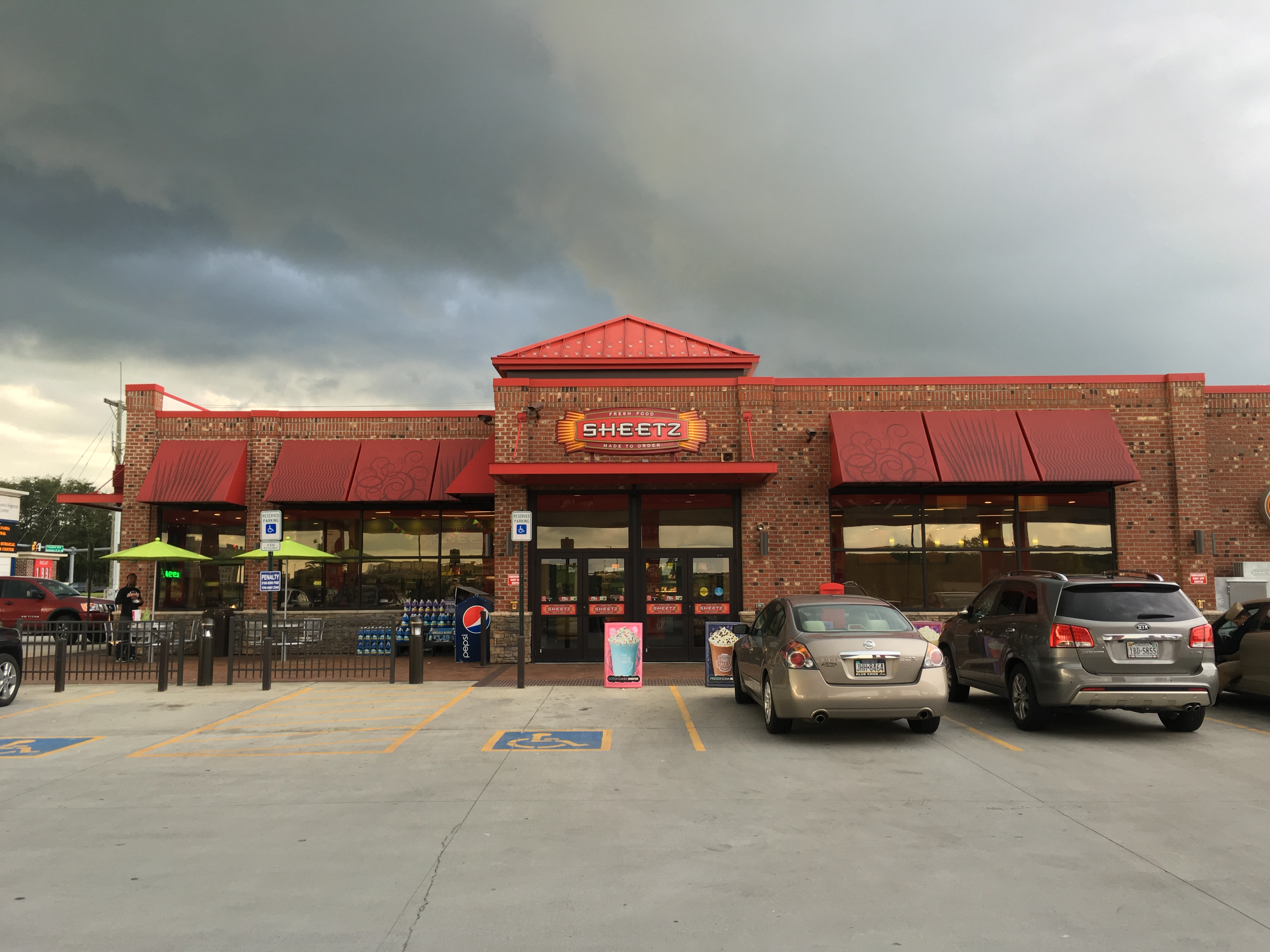
Sheetz store in Fredericksburg, Virginia, 2016

Sheetz announced in November 2022 that the chain would expand into Michigan, its first new state in over 20 years, beginning in Metro Detroit with a planned opening in 2025. Sheetz then announced an expansion to nearby Greater Toledo shortly thereafter. On December 23, 2022, Sheetz announced an expansion into Wilmington, North Carolina to keep expanding south. The first Sheetz in Montgomery County, Maryland opened in August 2023 in Gaithersburg. That month, Sheetz announced they would open a new distribution center in Findlay, Ohio, to support expansions into new markets. Sheetz opened its first Michigan location, in Romulus, Michigan, on August 27, 2024. At around the same time, Sheetz opened its first location in Greater Cincinnati in Franklin, Ohio, with its first Hamilton County location expected to be in suburban Blue Ash.

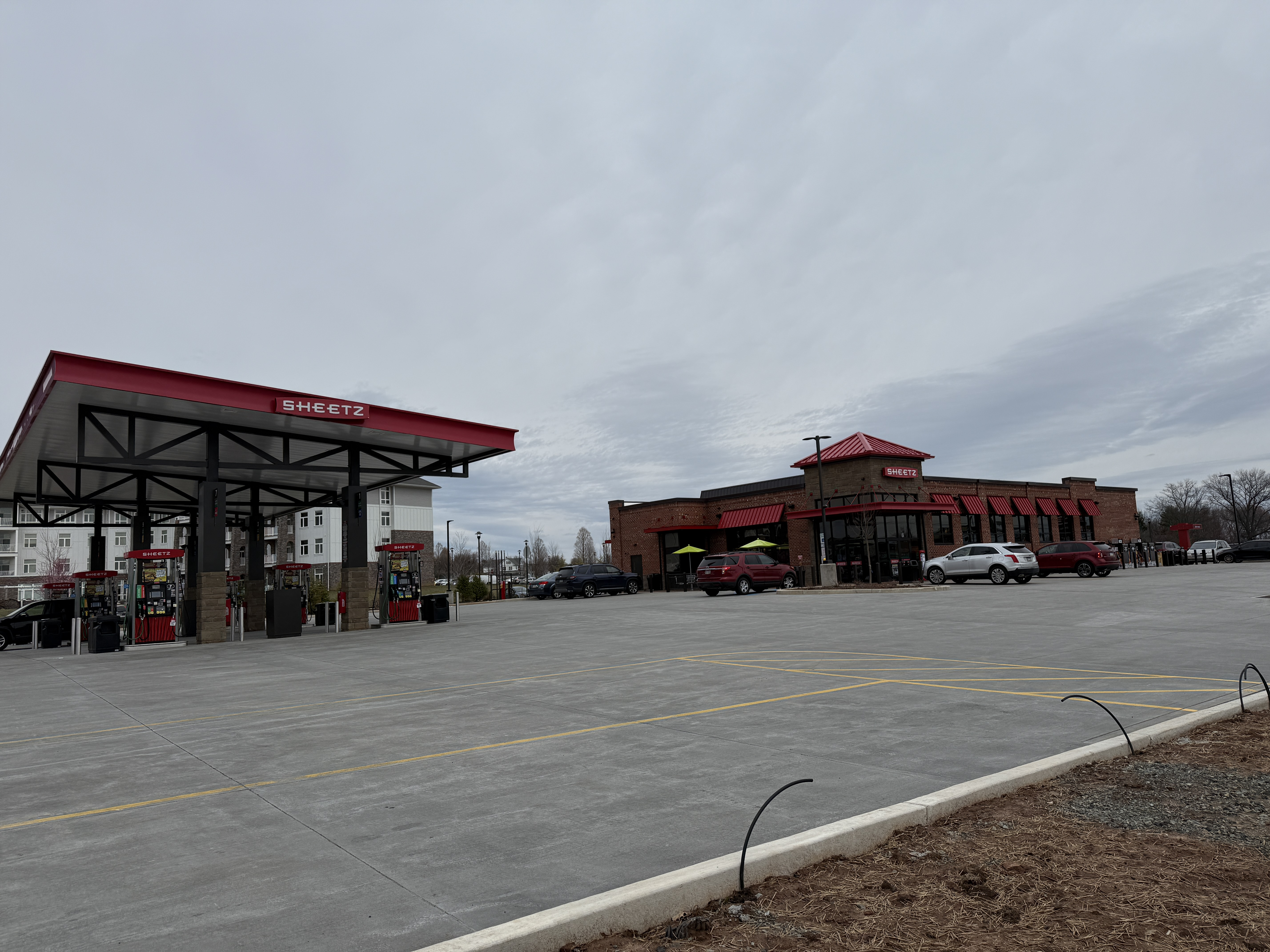
Sheetz location in Limerick Township, Pennsylvania. This is the first location in the Philadelphia metropolitan area.

On August 28, 2025, Sheetz announced it would build a location at a site of a former Rite Aid (originally Thrift Drug and later Eckerd) in Pittsburgh's Banksville neighborhood, marking Sheetz's first location in the Pittsburgh city limits since the 1990s. On February 12, 2026, Sheetz opened its first location in the Philadelphia metropolitan area, which has long been dominated by competitor convenience store chain Wawa, in Limerick Township, Pennsylvania.

Sheetz announced in April 2026 that the chain will be expanding to Indiana, with the first stores opening in the Indianapolis area in 2027, along with 100 more stores statewide within the next 10 years.

== Food service ==
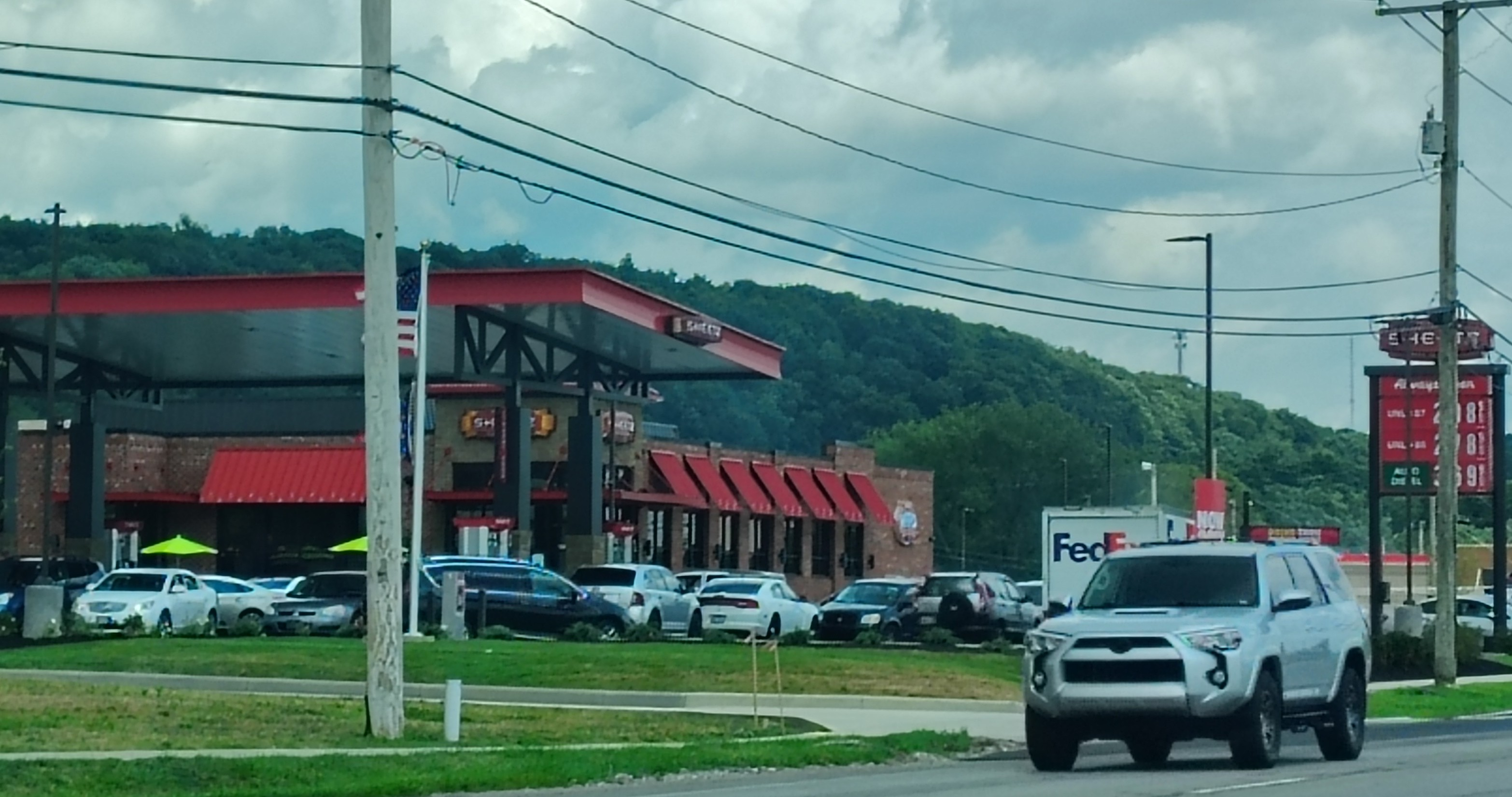
A Sheetz location during its grand opening in Lancaster, Ohio, southeast of Columbus, featuring Sheetz's new sloped canopy for fueling lanes at the stores, July 2024.

In 1986, to boost lagging sales, Earl Springer, the manager of a Sheetz in Williamsport, Maryland, pursued a food concept which became Sheetz's signature Made To Order (MTO) line. Beginning with only submarine sandwiches, customers would fill out a small slip of paper, designating the ingredients they wanted on their sandwich, and in what quantity. The order slip would be placed in a basket. The kitchen staff would prepare the sub according to the customer's order. Since that time, the menu expanded; by the 1990s, MTO was a sales leader for Sheetz. Beginning in 1996, the company phased out the paper ordering system in favor of a picture-based touchscreen computer system. Now common at many restaurants and gas stations worldwide, Sheetz was the first company to implement this technology.

By 1999, Sheetz sold 10,000 MTO units a day. The company trains employees to function as baristas for its newest brand, "Sheetz Bros. Coffeez," which offers higher-grade coffee than the coffee typically found in convenience stores or other gas stations. With the introduction of the "Convenience Restaurant" concept, they have expanded their menu. Customers can purchase a wide variety of food items. The Espresso Bar, offering specialty coffees, is found at all locations. Sheetz regularly offers customers free coffee on Christmas Day and New Year's Day. During 2008–2009, Sheetz rolled out "MTGo!", a grab and go assortment of sandwiches, wraps, fruits, veggies, and other small items for the hurried customer. Along with "MTGo!", Sheetz unveiled "Shweetz Bakery" items, including donuts, fritters, and muffins made and delivered daily from the "Sheetz Bros. Kitchen" in Claysburg, Pennsylvania.

=== Food-only stores ===
In 2003, Sheetz opened a concept store in the food court of Hanes Mall in Winston-Salem, North Carolina. This location offered Sheetz's made-to-order foods and fountain beverages in a more traditional fast food layout. It did not function as a convenience store. The store has since closed.

In 2012, Sheetz again began contemplating "new concept", "fuel-free" locations. In 2014, a plan was announced to open such a location on the campus of West Virginia University, in Morgantown, West Virginia. The intent was to call it "Sheetz MTO Market." However, when opened in February 2015 the store was named "Sheetz Café" (although outdoor signage is the same as all other stores). In September 2015, another no-fuel café opened in State College, Pennsylvania, near Pennsylvania State University. In Indiana, Pennsylvania, on the border of the Indiana University of Pennsylvania, a Sheetz which previously carried gasoline was torn down, and replaced with a no-fuel café that opened in August 2016. A fourth such location opened in September 2017, in Charlottesville, Virginia, directly across the street from the University of Virginia.

In September 2019, Sheetz announced it would not renew their lease with WVU for the Morgantown location. The company offered no explanation for the closure. In May 2021, Sheetz announced that the Charlottesville location, on the corner of UVA would close in June.

=== Alcohol sales in Pennsylvania ===
Until June 8, 2016, Pennsylvania state law prohibited the sale of alcohol in convenience stores. Beer had to be sold at a beer distributor while liquor had to be sold at state-operated stores titled "Wines & Spirits". In 2007, Sheetz tried to find a loophole around this by classifying part of one of their prototype stores in Altoona as a restaurant, which would permit alcohol sales. The Malt Beverage Distributors Association of Pennsylvania protested, temporarily barring Sheetz from selling beer. On appeal, Sheetz was awarded the license to sell beer and continues to do so today. On June 15, 2009, the Pennsylvania Supreme Court permitted Sheetz to sell beer for takeout under the condition that it is also available to drink on site. Sheetz successfully led the effort to change alcohol sales laws in Pennsylvania to allow sales in convenience and grocery stores, which became law when Governor Tom Wolf signed Act 39 into law on June 8, 2016.

== Fuel and tobacco sales ==
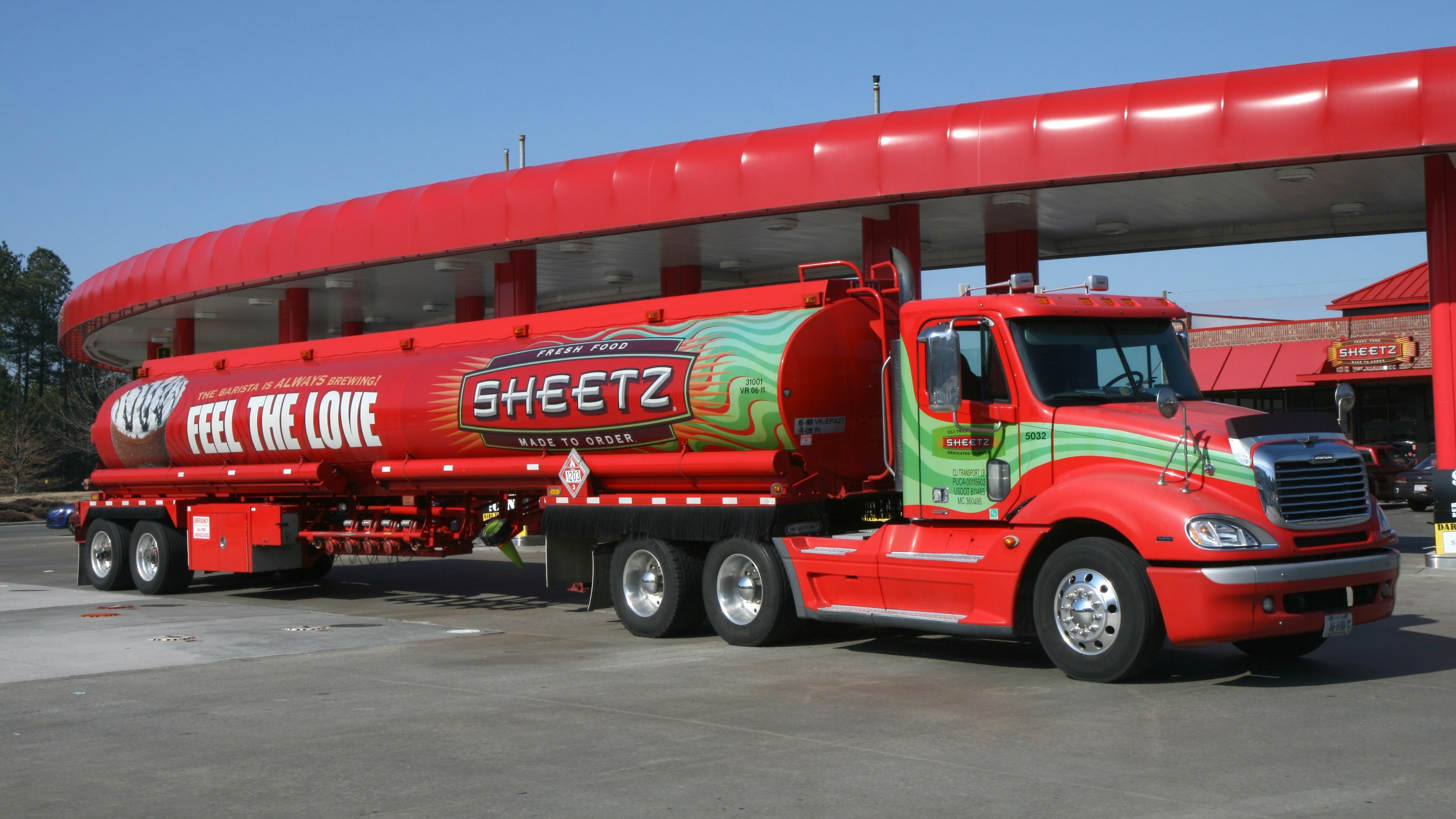
A Sheetz tanker truck arrives to refill fuel tanks at a station in Morrisville, North Carolina adjacent to Cary

The Sheetz stores that sell gasoline offer three grades of gasoline (87, 89, and 93 Octane), and most stores offer diesel. An increasing number of stores also provide E85 and E15, and some also offer ethanol-free gasoline. Some stores provide kerosene at separate pumps.

Sheetz is known for high fuel sales, primarily driven by strong inside sales from their MTOs and other products that lead to sales at the pumps. In Pennsylvania, Sheetz is the market leader in all fuel sales at over 21%, ahead of all other competitor convenience store chains including those selling fuel from Big Oil brands such as Exxon, Sunoco, and BP, all of which have a major presence in Pennsylvania alongside Sheetz. In addition to high fuel sales, Sheetz is known for high sales of tobacco products, often selling cigarettes at state minimum prices. At one point, Sheetz sold its brand of cigarettes called Jack's (named and themed after the type of playing card), but stopped offering them in the 2010s in their stores.

== Awards ==
- 2020 Best Regional Fast Food Chain by USA Today Readers' Choice awards
- No. 4 on the 2019 USA Today Readers' Choice list of Best Regional Fast Food
- Silver Plate Award from the International Food Manufacturers Association (2001)
- America's Largest Private Companies from Forbes (multiple years)
- Best Places to Work from Best Companies Group for Virginia and Pennsylvania (2012–2015)
- Best Employers from Best Companies Group for North Carolina and Ohio (2013–2015)
- 100 Best Companies to Work For from Fortune (2014, 2016–2020)
- Alternative Fuels leader of the Year Award from Convenience Store News, for installing flex fuels in North Carolina stores (2015)
- Fan-Based Growth Award for adding 102,000 followers on Facebook and Twitter; Twitter Tweeter Award for most tweets of any convenience store; Award for Encouraging Fan Engagement Creatively and Consistently; all from Convenience Store Decisions (2016)
- President's Trophy Award from the American Trucking Associations, for vehicle safety program, small carrier category (2013)
- 100 Best Workplaces for Millennials from Fortune (2016)
