= Phillies–Pirates rivalry =

Major League Baseball in-state rivalry in Pennsylvania

- Philadelphia Phillies Pittsburgh Pirates
- Location: Pennsylvania
- First meeting: May 30, 1887; Recreation Park, Philadelphia; Quakers 2, Alleghenys 1
- Latest meeting: July 2, 2026; Citizens Bank Park, Philadelphia; Pirates 6, Phillies 1
- Next meeting: June 25, 2027; PNC Park, Pittsburgh
- Stadiums: Phillies: Citizens Bank Park; Pirates: PNC Park

Statistics
- Total meetings: 2,337
- Regular season series: Pirates, 1,235–1,093–9 (.530)
- Largest victory: Phillies, 18–0 (July 11, 1910); Pirates, 23–6 (July 18, 1895)
- Longest win streak: Phillies, 11 (June 24–September 29, 1890); Pirates, 14 (September 27, 1921–August 10, 1922; August 6, 1990–August 14, 1991)
- Current win streak: Pirates, 1

Locations of the Philadelphia Phillies and Pittsburgh Pirates

The Phillies–Pirates rivalry, also known as the Keystone Series, is a Major League Baseball (MLB) rivalry between the Philadelphia Phillies and Pittsburgh Pirates. Both clubs are members of MLB's National League (NL); the Phillies are members of the NL East division, while the Pirates are members of the NL Central division. The rivalry was considered by some to be one of the best in the NL. The rivalry started when the Pittsburgh Pirates entered NL play in their fifth season of 1887, four years after the Phillies.

The Phillies and Pirates had remained together after the NL split into two divisions in 1969. During the period of two-division play (1969–1993), the two NL East division rivals won the two highest numbers of division championships, reigning almost exclusively as NL East champions in the 1970s and again in the early 1990s, the Pirates 9, the Phillies 6; together, the two teams' 15 championships accounted for more than half of the 25 NL East championships during that span.

After the Pirates moved to the NL Central in 1994, the teams face each other only in two series each year and the rivalry has diminished. However, many fans, especially older ones, retain their dislike for the other team and regional differences between Eastern and Western Pennsylvania still fuel the rivalry. The rivalry is mirrored in the National Hockey League's so-called "Battle of Pennsylvania".

== Early history to before 1970 ==
Before 1970, the rivalry seemed to be low-key, because the two teams were seldom equally good at the same time. However, in 1901, the Pirates and the Phillies finished first and second in the standings for the first time respectively, with the Pirates finishing 7 1/2 games ahead of the Phillies.

However, afterward, the Phillies would not win their first National League pennant until 1915, thanks to the pitching of Grover Cleveland Alexander and the batting prowess of Gavvy Cravath, who set the major-league single-season record for home runs with 24. During that time, the Pirates dominated the National League, winning three more pennants, in 1902, 1903, when they lost the inaugural World Series, and when they won their first World Series, in 1909, becoming the first team to open a new stadium with a World Series championship, having played their first season at Forbes Field that year.

The Phillies were in the midst of a period of futility from 1918 to 1948 when the Pirates won the 1925 World Series and the 1927 National League pennant. During that time, the Phillies had only one winning season, in 1932. From 1933 to 1948, the Phillies posted 16 consecutive losing seasons, a major league record that stood until 2009 (ironically broken by the Pirates).

After World War II, the Pirates had limited success, despite the presence of a genuine star in Ralph Kiner, who led the National League in home runs for seven consecutive seasons (1946–1952). During that time, the Phillies would have their first winning season in 17 years in 1949, and the following year, the Whiz Kids of the Phillies would win their second National League pennant, though they lost to the New York Yankees in the 1950 World Series. In 1960, the Phillies were in last place when the Pirates won the World Series.

== 1970s: Exclusive reign of division championships ==
It was during the 1970s that the rivalry became intense. The Phillies and the Pirates made up 10 of the possible 11 National League Championship Series appearances from 1970 to 1980. However, neither team enjoyed success during LCS appearances. The Phillies went 1–3 and the Pirates went 2–4 in NLCS appearances. In most cases, the teams had to face "The Big Red Machine" of the Cincinnati Reds in the NLCS. In each of the years the two teams won a pennant, they won a World Series (Pirates in 1971 and 1979 and Phillies in 1980).

From 1970 to 1980, the two teams reigned exclusively as National League East champions, except in 1973, when the New York Mets won the National League pennant. The Phillies' success under manager Danny Ozark was attributed to a well-rounded lineup with Greg Luzinski and Mike Schmidt leading the team in homers, Steve Carlton and Tug McGraw leading the pitching, and Larry Bowa and Garry Maddox being the secretaries of Philadelphia's defense. The Pirates, under managers Danny Murtaugh and Chuck Tanner, also had tremendous offense led by Roberto Clemente, Willie Stargell, Dave Parker, and Rennie Stennett, catcher Manny Sanguillén, infielders Bill Madlock and Phil Garner being the defensive specialists, and Dock Ellis, John Candelaria, Steve Blass and Bob Moose leading the pitching.

=== 1970–1972: Pirates three-peat ===
Both teams opened new stadiums in successive years. The Pirates opened Three Rivers Stadium in 1970, while the Phillies opened Veterans Stadium in the South Philadelphia Sports Complex the following year.

During this period, the Pirates won three straight division champions, from 1970 to 1972. However, the Phillies didn't enjoy any success, finishing next-to-last in 1970 and in last place in 1971 and 1972. On June 25, 1971, Willie Stargell of the Pirates hit the longest home run in the history of Veterans Stadium in a 14–4 Pirates win. The spot where the ball landed was marked with a yellow star with a black "S" inside a white circle until Stargell's 2001 death, when the white circle was painted black. The star remained until the stadium's 2004 demolition.

=== 1974–1980 ===
The rivalry was heated as both the Phillies and Pirates reigned exclusively as National League East Division champions. They also played each other 126 times and split the games, 63–63. For four straight years, the team that didn't win the division finished second in the standings.

The Pirates won the division in 1974, 1975, and 1979, while the Phillies won three consecutive division titles from 1976 to 1978 and again in 1980.

During the 1974 season. Phillies' second baseman Dave Cash coined the phrase "Yes We Can" for the team. Indeed, for a while, it looked as if they could. They led the division for 51 days. However, in August and September, the Phillies suffered a minor collapse, going 25–32 and it was "No They Couldn't," giving the Pirates the division title. The Pirates lost in the 1974 National League Championship Series to the Los Angeles Dodgers.

In 1975, the Pirates won the division championship at home against the Phillies and finished 6 1/2 games ahead of the Phillies. In the 1975 National League Championship Series, they were swept by the eventual champion Reds.

In 1976, the two teams opened their season against each other in Philadelphia. Johnny Oates of the Phillies had been designated to platoon alongside catcher Bob Boone in the season. However, in the season opener, Oates cracked his collar bone in a collision at home plate with Dave Parker and missed almost half the season. The Phillies won their first National League East title, eclipsing the century mark for wins in a season for the first time in franchise history with 101 wins, nine games over the Pirates. However, like the Pirates the year before, the Phillies were swept in the National League Championship Series by the eventual champion Reds.

In 1977, the Phillies eclipsed the century mark for wins in a season for the second year in a row with 101 wins, five games over the Pirates. However, they lost in the 1977 National League Championship Series to the Los Angeles Dodgers.

In 1978, the Pirates came from fourth place and 11 1/2 games behind in mid-August to challenge the Phillies for the division title and the teams met in the last regular-season series of the season to decide the division title. The Phillies arrived in Pittsburgh for a four-game series ahead of the Pirates by 3 1/2 on September 29. The Pirates swept a double-header to extend their winning streak of home wins to 24 and to trim the gap to 1 1/2 games. In the third game of the series, Willie Stargell hit a grand slam home run and it looked like the lead would be cut to half a game. Instead, Phillies pitcher Randy Lerch hit two home runs to help the Phillies come from behind to win the game, 10–8, to win their third straight division title on the next-to-last day of the season. This was the first time that visiting teams won a division title at Three Rivers Stadium. In the postseason, the Phillies lost for the second year in a row to the Dodgers in the 1978 National League Championship Series.

Both teams won World Series in successive years in 1979 and 1980. In 1979, the Phillies acquired infielders Manny Trillo and Pete Rose, but the Pirates were too dominant as Stargell shared MVP honors with Keith Hernandez and won their most recent one that year. The following year, the Phillies won their first one.

The Phillies winning the 1980 World Series was a moment of peace in the rivalry. Moments after Tug McGraw struck out Willie Wilson of the Kansas City Royals with the bases loaded to preserve the win for Steve Carlton and the Phillies, leaping from the mound to embrace catcher Bob Boone on the field at Veterans Stadium in Philadelphia, Pennsylvania Governor Dick Thornburgh, himself from Pittsburgh, signed a proclamation declaring the next day "World Championship Philadelphia Phillies Day" in the state. During the team's post-parade celebration that day at John F. Kennedy Stadium, the governor said that the rivalry was at peace because "nobody competes with the Phillies today. Philadelphia, Pennsylvania, today is the baseball capital of the world. All Pennsylvania is proud of you."

== 1980s ==
In the 1980s, the rivalry saw a moment of peace twice. The game between the two teams during the Phillies home opener on April 13, 1981, was a moment of peace in the rivalry. When the Phillies received their World Series rings, the team in the visitors' dugout was the Pirates. The Phillies won the game 5–1, giving Phillies starter Steve Carlton his 250th career victory.

In 1982, when Willie Stargell played his final season, both the Phillies and Pirates declared "Willie Stargell Day" in honor of Stargell's last games. The Pirates honored him on September 6 before they won a game against the New York Mets, while the Phillies honored him during a game against the Pirates on September 19, Stargell's final game in Philadelphia.

Both teams finished first and second in the standings with the Phillies finishing six games ahead of the Pirates in their pennant season of 1983.

In the mid to late 1980s, the rivalry was often low-key, as both teams sank in the standings. The only time during that period either team was able to post a winning record was during the playoff years of the New York Mets, and on both occasions, not only finished second in the standings but also the only team in the National League East other than the Mets to post a winning record (Phillies in 1986 and Pirates in 1988).

However, the rivalry had some memorable moments during that time. During a Phillies 8–6 win in Pittsburgh, on April 18, 1987, Mike Schmidt of the Phillies hit his 500th career home run in the ninth inning, a three-run home run.

=== 1989: Phillies ten-run comeback ===
Perhaps the most memorable moment in the rivalry during the 1980s came on June 8, 1989. The Pirates scored 10 runs in the top of the first inning of a game at Veterans Stadium, including three on a Barry Bonds home run. As the Phillies came to bat in the bottom of the first, Pirates broadcaster (and former pitcher) Jim Rooker said on the air, "If we lose this game, I'll walk home." Instead, both Von Hayes and Steve Jeltz hit two home runs (the latter would hit only five during his Major League career) to trigger a Phillies comeback.

The Phillies, trailing now only 11–10 in the eighth inning, scored the tying run on a wild pitch, then took the lead on Darren Daulton's two-run single and went on to win 15–11. The Pirates became the first team to lose a game after scoring 10 runs in the first inning. Rooker had to wait until after the season to make good on his "walk home" promise, conducting a 300-plus-mile charity walk from Philadelphia to Pittsburgh.

== 1990–1993: Another exclusive reign of division championships ==
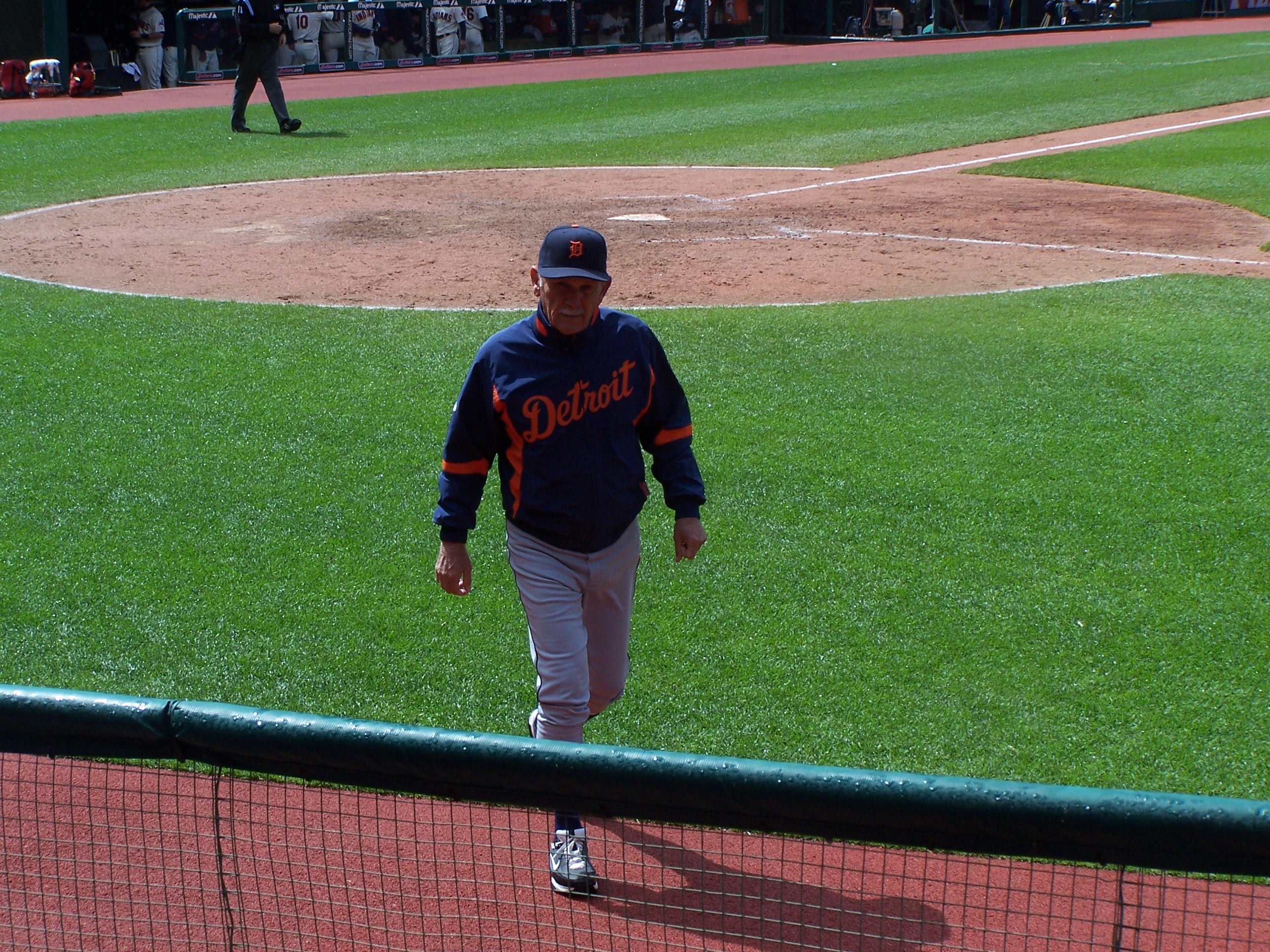
Jim Leyland managed the Pirates to three straight division championships. However, he watched the Phillies win the 1993 division championship in Pittsburgh.

In 1990, the Phillies and Pirates began another exclusive reign of National League East championships, although both franchises did not field contenders until deep into the season during that reign. The Pirates, with sluggers Barry Bonds and Bobby Bonilla and pitcher Doug Drabek, and managed by Jim Leyland, won three straight, from 1990 to 1992 (Bonilla wasn't with the Pirates in 1992), while the Phillies, led by stars such as Darren Daulton, John Kruk, Lenny Dykstra, and Curt Schilling, won the 1993 NL pennant. All NL East division titles during this period, except for 1990, were won at Three Rivers Stadium.

=== 1990–1992: Another Pirates three-peat ===
In 1990, the Pirates returned to the postseason for the first time since winning the 1979 World Series, but lost to the Cincinnati Reds in the 1990 National League Championship Series.

The 1991 Pirates won the division for the second straight year, aided by their 12–6 record against the Phillies, and won the division championship in the final meeting between the two teams. When the Phillies saw the Pirates celebrate the championship, several Phillies, including outfielder Wes Chamberlain and shortstop Dickie Thon said that they had seen it before, but Phillies manager Jim Fregosi "didn't watch it" after seeing Pittsburgh Police and Pirates security ring the field. The Pirates became the first NL East team to win consecutive division titles since the Phillies in 1978, but lost to the Atlanta Braves in the 1991 National League Championship Series.

In 1992, Phillies second baseman Mickey Morandini performed an unassisted triple play against the Pirates and, in doing so, became the first second baseman in National League history and the first overall player in the regular season to do so. The Pirates went on to three-peat for the second time, and were the first National League East team to do so since the Phillies in 1976–1978. Once again, they lost to the Braves in the National League Championship Series.

=== 1993: Phillies go from worst to the National League pennant ===
In 1993, the Phillies, who finished in last place in 1992, steadily led the NL East and were in first place every day but one day, April 9. The Pirates were in first place on the very day that the Phillies weren't in first place. On August 29, the Phillies had a 10 1/2-game lead, but a September slip caused some columnists in the city to compare the club to the 1964 team, which surrendered a 6 1/2 game lead during the last weeks of the season, losing 10 games in a row with 12 games remaining and losing the pennant by one game to the eventual champion St. Louis Cardinals. They dropped five of seven at home, reducing their lead to four with 13 games remaining.

On September 27, the Phillies came into Pittsburgh for a four-game series against the Pirates. The Phillies were ahead by 6 games with seven games left: four against the Pirates and the last three against the Cardinals. The Phillies won the opener, 6–4, and with the Florida Marlins winning at home against the second place Montreal Expos, 3–1, clinched at least a tie for first place in the division. The next day, the Phillies were trailing 4–3 after giving up three runs in the sixth, but with a six-run seventh inning, capped by Mariano Duncan's grand slam home run, they won their first division title since winning the 1983 National League pennant. Outfielder Wes Chamberlain ended all the references to 1964, screaming, "It's 1993, baby! It ain't 1964. Where are all those ghosts now?" Many Phillies fans had made the cross-state trip to Pittsburgh to see their team clinch and after the game, manager Jim Fregosi threw his cap to them as he walked off the field. Although Fregosi won the American League West title as manager of the California Angels in 1979, he said that 1993 was "the most gratifying year I have ever spent in baseball. It's just great. There's nothing like that. I'm just so proud of these guys. They've been great all year long."

Pirates manager Jim Leyland, this time, had to see the Phillies celebration from the home team dugout. He watched the celebration, unlike Fregosi two years before, and said: "To me, the real grind is the 162-game schedule...On behalf of the entire Pirates organization, I congratulate the Phillies. They did a tremendous job. It's well deserved. They earned everything they got. They should be real proud of doing it—and real proud of the way they did it." It was only the third time that a visiting team had won a division title at Three Rivers Stadium, following the Phillies themselves in 1978 and the Chicago Cubs in 1984.

Like the Pirates in 1991 and 1992, the Phillies faced the Braves in the 1993 National League Championship Series. However, they beat the Braves, but lost to the Toronto Blue Jays in the World Series on the famous walk-off home run by Joe Carter.

== End of divisional rivalry ==
The two teams met 18 times during a season for the last time in 1992. The following year, the number of meetings was reduced to 13, as the National League expanded to include the Florida Marlins.

The rivalry came to an end when MLB realigned for 1994 in the form of three divisions in each league, and the addition of an expanded playoff format. When agreeing on the realignment, the Pirates switched to the newly created Central Division and gave up their spot in the NL East to the Atlanta Braves.

=== Reaction to realignment ===
Pirates President Mark Sauer said that "there are a lot of reasons for the Pirates to be in...the Central...Our key marketing people...all think this is the way to go." He also cited that "[the] Cleveland [Indians], the closest franchise to Pittsburgh, also chose the Central when faced with the same East vs. Central decision." However, manager Jim Leyland felt that the "move should have little on-field impact." Pittsburgh's general manager, Cam Bonifay, said that "based on our rivalries and our fan base, we feel comfortable being in the Central Division." He also based it that the Pittsburgh Steelers in the National Football League were in the same division as two of the same cities the Steelers have in their division, Cincinnati and Houston, saying that "we don't feel that there's any major difference between the Eastern and Central Divisions. With the Steelers' being in the Central Division, from our fans' viewpoint, it would not limit our rivalries. Our fan base understands where we are geographically. The size of the markets of Houston, St. Louis and Cincinnati are more in line." Additionally, even though the Marlins did offer to go to the Central, the Pirates didn't want to play in the same division as the Braves since the team wasn't sure how long the Braves were going to be good, and felt it would be more competitive in the Central.

On the Phillies side, President Bill Giles said that the realignment made him "disappointed at losing the cross-state rivalry," and "strongly feel Pittsburgh should be in the East, because we've had a rivalry with them for 104 years. I just think there's a more legitimate argument for keeping the two Pennsylvania teams together." However, he was fortunate that the realignment solidified their rivalry with the New York Mets.

== After realignment ==
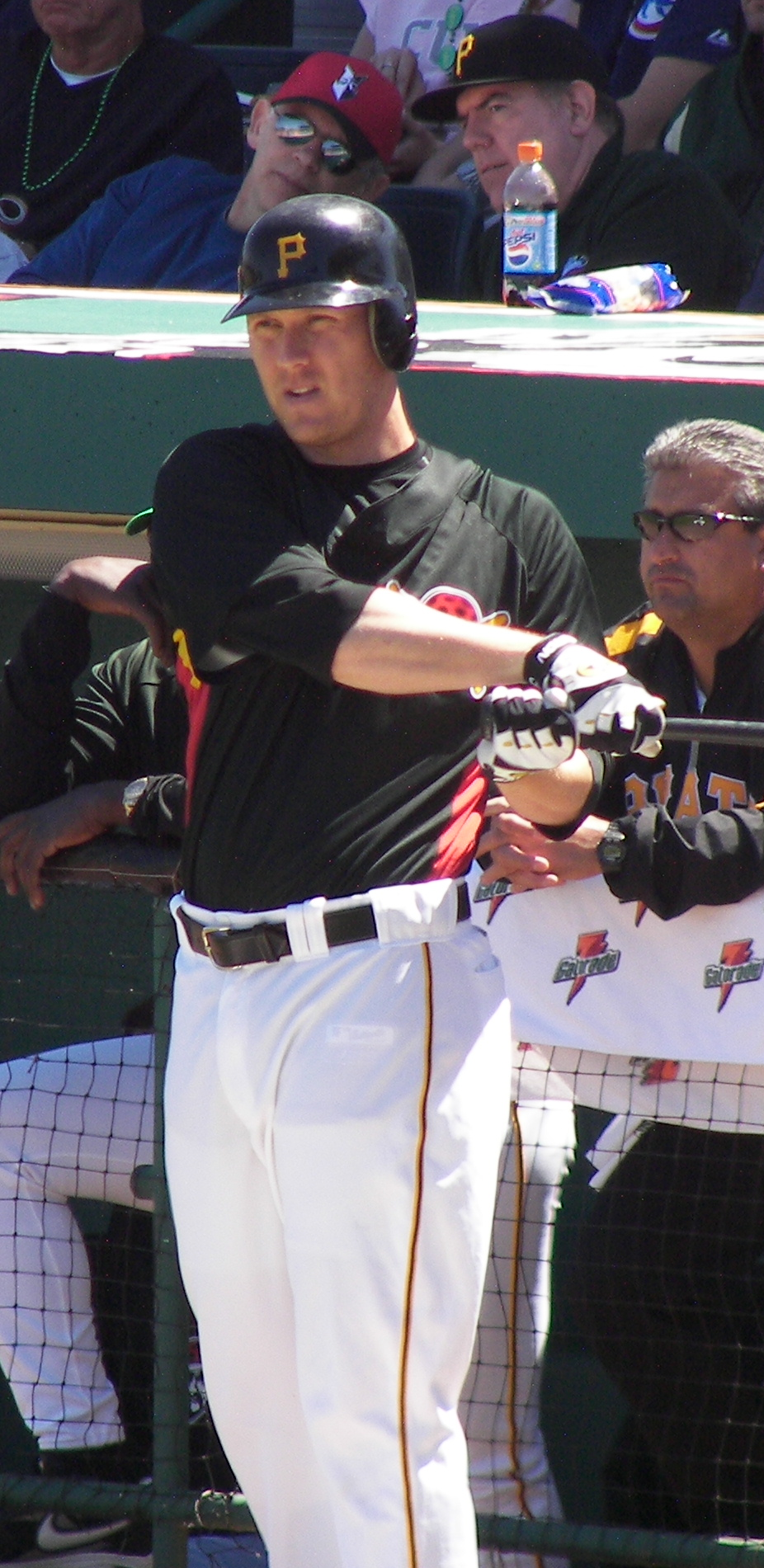
Jason Bay thought the rivalry "would definitely be magnified" if the two teams meet in the playoffs.

After their loss to the Atlanta Braves in the 1992 NLCS, the Pirates lost Bonds and Doug Drabek to free agency, and had a long and protracted recovery following that: they had 20 straight losing seasons between 1993 and 2012, and did not reach the playoffs again until 2013. (The team's predictions on the Braves did turn out to be correct, however: the Braves would win every NL East title through the 2005 season, excluding the 1994 season, which was cut short due to the player's strike.) The Phillies, after winning the 1993 pennant, also struggled through the 1990s, but won five straight division championships from 2007 to 2011, had the best record in baseball back-to-back in 2010 and 2011, in 2011 set a franchise record for wins in a season with 102, breaking the previous record of 101 in 1976 and 1977, and broke the Curse of Billy Penn to win the 2008 World Series.

Although the rivalry may not reignite soon, since 2005, those associated with the Phillies and the Pirates would like to see the rivalry reignited, so that they can see both teams play each other quite often.

In 2000, there was talk of subdividing the National League into four divisions. The proposed realignment had the Pirates return to a four-team NL East with the Phillies, Mets, and Montreal Expos. The alignment would've gone into effect for the 2001 MLB season, coinciding with the Pirates opening PNC Park. The proposal eventually was abandoned before reaching a vote.

In 2005, Phillies pitcher Jon Lieber, a former Pirate, called it "a shame" that the two teams "don't play more often", and "we'd get back to playing more National League teams." Pirates broadcaster Bob Walk said that "this is a rivalry that I grew up with...For some of us older Pirates and Phillies fans and faithful and players, the rivalry is kind of still there...I know the history of it...Because I was on the other side of it, too." Phillies General Manager Ed Wade said that he could "certainly feel it, having been on both ends", having started his career with the Pirates in their public relations department in the late 1970s.

During the series between the two teams at Citizens Bank Park in Philadelphia in 2006, Pirates outfielder Jason Bay said that "you only face these guys one (series) here and once at our place. Six games is tough to really fire that rivalry in there...If we ever get into playoffs, it would definitely be magnified." However, Phillies outfielder Bobby Abreu said that the realignment meant games between the Phillies and the Pirates "are just two teams playing against each other, just trying to get a win."

Pirates President Frank Coonelly, himself born and raised in Philadelphia, said that he wanted to see more of both the Phillies and the New York Mets at PNC Park. He said that "it is a shame our fans only get one opportunity a year to see two clubs with whom we have had such great rivalries," and that "our challenge...is that the combination of interleague play and the unbalanced schedule means that we only see...the Phillies and the Mets one time a year in Pittsburgh. We need to have these rivals in Pittsburgh more often. That can be accomplished through realignment or a more balanced schedule." Manager John Russell and first baseman Adam LaRoche agreed, saying that the Phillies, Pirates, and Mets should be in the same division, as all three "were interchangeable for a while, with the great matchups...But now, we're the ones separated." After becoming manager of the Mets for the 2011 season, Terry Collins raised the issue further when he chose to wear 10 to honor Jim Leyland, having served on his coaching staff when with the Pirates in 1992 and 1993. In 2011, when MLB was considering moving an existing National League team to the American League and requiring year-round interleague play, Coonelly suggested moving the Pirates back to the NL East if MLB decided against having a team switch leagues, with him adding, "If one National League division has to have six teams, nothing says it has to be the Central." MLB eventually decided to move the Houston Astros to the American League for the 2013 MLB season, leaving the Pirates in a reduced NL Central.

On October 16, 2017, it was reported that MLB commissioner Rob Manfred and the owners were seriously considering a radical realignment if MLB decided to pursue adding two expansion teams by eliminating the American and National League designations altogether and realigning teams to four eight-team divisions based on geography to cut travel costs down. The proposal would have the Pirates and Phillies within the East division, alongside existing rivals such as the Washington Nationals (for the Phillies) and Cincinnati Reds (for the Pirates) while including the Baltimore Orioles; the proposal, however, would leave the Mets (and by proxy the New York Yankees) out as well as the Cleveland Indians, all of whom would be included in the proposed North division despite the Mets having historic or existing rivalries with both the Pirates and Phillies and the Indians making geographic sense with the Pirates. The proposal is considered unrealistic by some experts, but more realistic proposals that retain the NL-AL setup have the two teams remain in separate divisions contingent on Montreal returning to the National League.

Due to the COVID-19 outbreak, the 2020 season delayed the start of the season by nearly four months and went to a greatly reduced schedule that only had each team face division rivals as well as teams from the corresponding divisions in the other league, in order to reduce travel and limit the spread of COVID-19. As both teams also missed the expanded postseason (the Pirates having the worst record in baseball), 2020 marked the first time in 134 years that the Phillies and Pirates didn't play each other at all. The two teams resumed playing each other in 2021.

Some sports fans in Philadelphia and Pittsburgh also want the rivalry to be reignited. The rivalry has also been attributed to the proximity between the two largest cities in the state of Pennsylvania, which are approximately six hours apart by car. The Phillies' fanbase comes from the Philadelphia metropolitan area, which includes southeastern Pennsylvania, central New Jersey south of Princeton, southern New Jersey, northern Delaware and extreme northeast parts of Maryland. Conversely, the Pirates' fanbase generally draws from the Pittsburgh metropolitan area, which includes Western Pennsylvania, most of the state of West Virginia, and parts of both Southeastern Ohio and the Maryland Panhandle. The Philadelphia–Pittsburgh rivalry is evident in other sports, as seen between the Philadelphia Flyers and the Pittsburgh Penguins in the National Hockey League.

Between 2022 and 2024, the score bug used by the NBC Sports Regional Networks and NBC Sports Philadelphia featured a horizontal layout displaying the score between the two teams' cap insignias: at the start of Phillies–Pirates games, the two teams' "P" insignias and a 0-0 score made the bug appear to read "P00P"—which became a meme among the two teams' fans. This phenomenon came to an end after the 2024 season, when NBC Sports updated the graphic to use team abbreviations instead of logos; during the teams' first meeting of the 2025 season, Phillies play-by-play announcer Tom McCarthy jokingly memorialized the former scorebug, describing it as a "an unforgettable icon. Its name, once met with chuckles, quickly became synonymous with good times and fierce rivalries."

== Season-by-season results ==
Phillies vs. Pirates Season-by-Season Results
1880s (Phillies, 35–21–1)

Season	Season series		at Philadelphia Phillies	at Pittsburgh Alleghenys	Overall series	Notes
1887	Phillies	12‍–‍6	Phillies, 5‍–‍4	Phillies, 7‍–‍2	Phillies; 12‍–‍6	
1888	Phillies	14‍–‍6‍–‍1	Phillies, 7‍–‍4	Phillies, 7‍–‍2‍–‍1	Phillies; 26‍–‍12‍–‍1	
1889	Tie	9‍–‍9	Phillies, 7‍–‍1	Pirates, 8‍–‍2	Phillies; 35‍–‍21‍–‍1	

1890s (Phillies, 83–58)

Season	Season series		at Philadelphia Phillies	at Pittsburgh Alleghenys/Pirates	Overall series	Notes
1890	Phillies	17‍–‍2	Phillies, 16‍–‍1	Tie, 1‍–‍1	Phillies; 52‍–‍23‍–‍1	
1891	Phillies	12‍–‍8	Phillies, 6‍–‍4	Phillies, 6‍–‍4	Phillies; 64‍–‍31‍–‍1	Alleghenys rename to "Pittsburgh Pirates"; Pirates open another new Exposition Park
1892	Phillies	8‍–‍6	Phillies, 4‍–‍3	Phillies, 4‍–‍3	Phillies; 72‍–‍37‍–‍1	
1893	Phillies	7‍–‍5	Phillies, 5‍–‍1	Pirates, 4‍–‍2	Phillies; 79‍–‍42‍–‍1	
1894	Phillies	8‍–‍4	Phillies, 5‍–‍1	Tie, 3‍–‍3	Phillies; 87‍–‍46‍–‍1	
1895	Phillies	8‍–‍4	Phillies, 5‍–‍1	Tie, 3‍–‍3	Phillies; 95‍–‍50‍–‍1	
1896	Tie	6‍–‍6	Phillies, 4‍–‍2	Pirates, 4‍–‍2	Phillies; 101‍–‍56‍–‍1	
1897	Pirates	7‍–‍5	Pirates, 4‍–‍2	Tie, 3‍–‍3	Phillies; 106‍–‍63‍–‍1	
1898	Pirates	8‍–‍6	Phillies, 4‍–‍3	Pirates, 5‍–‍2	Phillies; 112‍–‍71‍–‍1	
1899	Pirates	8‍–‍6	Phillies, 5‍–‍2	Pirates, 6‍–‍1	Phillies; 118‍–‍79‍–‍1	

1900s (Pirates, 137–75–1)

Season	Season series		at Philadelphia Phillies	at Pittsburgh Pirates	Overall series	Notes
1900	Pirates	11‍–‍9	Phillies, 6‍–‍4	Pirates, 7‍–‍3	Phillies; 127‍–‍90‍–‍1	Pirates lose 1900 Chronicle-Telegraph Cup
1901	Pirates	13‍–‍7	Pirates, 6‍–‍4	Pirates, 7‍–‍3	Phillies; 134‍–‍103‍–‍1	Pirates win 1901 National League pennant
1902	Pirates	18‍–‍2	Pirates, 8‍–‍2	Pirates, 10‍–‍0	Phillies; 136‍–‍121‍–‍1	Pirates win 1902 National League pennant
1903	Pirates	16‍–‍4‍–‍1	Pirates, 8‍–‍2‍–‍1	Pirates, 8‍–‍2	Phillies; 140‍–‍137‍–‍2	Pirates lose the inaugural 1903 World Series
1904	Pirates	13‍–‍9	Pirates, 7‍–‍4	Pirates, 6‍–‍5	Pirates; 150‍–‍149‍–‍2	Pirates take a 150‍–‍149‍–‍2 lead on October 3 in the series, a lead they would never relinquish.
1905	Pirates	16‍–‍6	Pirates, 8‍–‍2	Pirates, 8‍–‍4	Pirates; 166‍–‍155‍–‍2	
1906	Pirates	14‍–‍8	Pirates, 8‍–‍3	Pirates, 6‍–‍5	Pirates; 180‍–‍163‍–‍2	
1907	Phillies	14‍–‍8	Phillies, 7‍–‍4	Phillies, 7‍–‍4	Pirates; 188‍–‍177‍–‍2	
1908	Pirates	13‍–‍9	Pirates, 8‍–‍3	Phillies, 6‍–‍5	Pirates; 201‍–‍186‍–‍2	
1909	Pirates	15‍–‍7	Pirates, 6‍–‍5	Pirates, 9‍–‍2	Pirates; 216‍–‍193‍–‍2	Pirates open Forbes Field; Pirates win 1909 World Series

1910s (Phillies, 107–105–2)

Season	Season series		at Philadelphia Phillies	at Pittsburgh Pirates	Overall series	Notes
1910	Tie	11‍–‍11	Pirates, 6‍–‍5	Phillies, 6‍–‍5	Pirates; 227‍–‍204‍–‍2	
1911	Phillies	13‍–‍9	Phillies, 9‍–‍2	Pirates, 7‍–‍4	Pirates; 236‍–‍217‍–‍2	
1912	Pirates	14‍–‍8	Pirates, 6‍–‍5	Pirates, 8‍–‍3	Pirates; 250‍–‍225‍–‍2	
1913	Pirates	11‍–‍9‍–‍2	Pirates, 8‍–‍3‍–‍1	Phillies, 6‍–‍3‍–‍1	Pirates; 261‍–‍234‍–‍4	
1914	Phillies	12‍–‍10	Phillies, 7‍–‍4	Pirates, 6‍–‍5	Pirates; 271‍–‍246‍–‍4	
1915	Pirates	12‍–‍10	Pirates, 6‍–‍5	Pirates, 6‍–‍5	Pirates; 283‍–‍256‍–‍4	Phillies lose 1915 World Series
1916	Phillies	13‍–‍9	Phillies, 9‍–‍2	Pirates, 7‍–‍4	Pirates; 292‍–‍269‍–‍4	
1917	Phillies	14‍–‍8	Phillies, 8‍–‍3	Phillies, 6‍–‍5	Pirates; 300‍–‍283‍–‍4	
1918	Phillies	11‍–‍7	Phillies, 5‍–‍2	Phillies, 6‍–‍5	Pirates; 307‍–‍294‍–‍4	
1919	Pirates	14‍–‍6	Pirates, 7‍–‍3	Pirates, 7‍–‍3	Pirates; 321‍–‍300‍–‍4	

1920s (Pirates, 148–71–1)

Season	Season series		at Philadelphia Phillies	at Pittsburgh Pirates	Overall series	Notes
1920	Pirates	13‍–‍9	Pirates, 8‍–‍3	Phillies, 6‍–‍5	Pirates; 334‍–‍309‍–‍4	
1921	Pirates	18‍–‍4	Pirates, 8‍–‍3	Pirates, 10‍–‍1	Pirates; 352‍–‍313‍–‍4	
1922	Pirates	19‍–‍3	Pirates, 9‍–‍2	Pirates, 10‍–‍1	Pirates; 371‍–‍316‍–‍4	
1923	Pirates	13‍–‍9	Pirates, 7‍–‍4	Pirates, 6‍–‍5	Pirates; 384‍–‍325‍–‍4	
1924	Pirates	13‍–‍8	Pirates, 7‍–‍3	Pirates, 6‍–‍5	Pirates; 397‍–‍333‍–‍4	
1925	Pirates	14‍–‍8	Pirates, 7‍–‍4	Pirates, 7‍–‍4	Pirates; 411‍–‍341‍–‍4	Pirates win 1925 World Series
1926	Pirates	14‍–‍8	Pirates, 6‍–‍5	Pirates, 8‍–‍3	Pirates; 425‍–‍349‍–‍4	
1927	Pirates	15‍–‍7‍–‍1	Pirates, 6‍–‍5‍–‍1	Pirates, 9‍–‍2	Pirates; 440‍–‍356‍–‍5	Pirates lose 1927 World Series
1928	Pirates	18‍–‍4	Pirates, 9‍–‍2	Pirates, 9‍–‍2	Pirates; 458‍–‍360‍–‍5	
1929	Tie	11‍–‍11	Phillies, 6‍–‍5	Pirates, 6‍–‍5	Pirates; 469‍–‍371‍–‍5	

1930s (Pirates, 126–90–1)

Season	Season series		at Philadelphia Phillies	at Pittsburgh Pirates	Overall series	Notes
1930	Pirates	13‍–‍9	Phillies, 6‍–‍5	Pirates, 8‍–‍3	Pirates; 482‍–‍380‍–‍5	
1931	Phillies	13‍–‍9	Phillies, 8‍–‍3	Pirates, 6‍–‍5	Pirates; 491‍–‍393‍–‍5	
1932	Phillies	14‍–‍8	Phillies, 6‍–‍5	Phillies, 8‍–‍3	Pirates; 499‍–‍407‍–‍5	
1933	Pirates	15‍–‍7	Pirates, 7‍–‍4	Pirates, 8‍–‍3	Pirates; 514‍–‍414‍–‍5	
1934	Pirates	13‍–‍7	Pirates, 5‍–‍4	Pirates, 8‍–‍3	Pirates; 527‍–‍421‍–‍5	
1935	Pirates	16‍–‍6	Pirates, 8‍–‍3	Pirates, 8‍–‍3	Pirates; 543‍–‍427‍–‍5	
1936	Pirates	15‍–‍7	Pirates, 9‍–‍3	Pirates, 6‍–‍4	Pirates; 558‍–‍434‍–‍5	
1937	Tie	11‍–‍11	Phillies, 6‍–‍5	Pirates, 6‍–‍5	Pirates; 569‍–‍445‍–‍5	
1938	Pirates	12‍–‍8‍–‍1	Pirates, 6‍–‍3‍–‍1	Pirates, 6‍–‍5	Pirates; 581‍–‍453‍–‍6	Phillies move into Shibe Park midway through the season
1939	Pirates	14‍–‍8	Pirates, 7‍–‍4	Pirates, 7‍–‍4	Pirates; 595‍–‍461‍–‍6	

1940s (Pirates, 121–95–2)

Season	Season series		at Philadelphia Phillies	at Pittsburgh Pirates	Overall series	Notes
1940	Pirates	16‍–‍6	Pirates, 9‍–‍3	Pirates, 7‍–‍3	Pirates; 611‍–‍467‍–‍6	
1941	Pirates	16‍–‍6	Pirates, 7‍–‍4	Pirates, 9‍–‍2	Pirates; 627‍–‍473‍–‍6	
1942	Pirates	13‍–‍6	Phils, 5‍–‍4	Pirates, 9‍–‍1	Pirates; 640‍–‍479‍–‍6	Phillies change their name to "Phils"
1943	Pirates	12‍–‍10‍–‍1	Phillies, 6‍–‍5‍–‍1	Pirates, 7‍–‍4	Pirates; 652‍–‍489‍–‍6	Phils revert their name to "Phillies"
1944	Pirates	12‍–‍9	Tie, 5‍–‍5	Pirates, 7‍–‍4	Pirates; 664‍–‍498‍–‍6	
1945	Pirates	16‍–‍6	Pirates, 7‍–‍4	Pirates, 9‍–‍2	Pirates; 680‍–‍504‍–‍6	
1946	Phillies	14‍–‍8	Phillies, 8‍–‍3	Phillies, 6‍–‍5	Pirates; 688‍–‍518‍–‍6	
1947	Phillies	13‍–‍9	Phillies, 7‍–‍4	Phillies, 6‍–‍5	Pirates; 697‍–‍531‍–‍6	
1948	Phillies	12‍–‍10‍–‍1	Phillies, 7‍–‍3	Pirates, 7‍–‍5‍–‍1	Pirates; 707‍–‍543‍–‍6	
1949	Phillies	13‍–‍9	Pirates, 6‍–‍5	Phillies, 8‍–‍3	Pirates; 716‍–‍556‍–‍6	

1950s (Phillies, 132–88)

Season	Season series		at Philadelphia Phillies	at Pittsburgh Pirates	Overall series	Notes
1950	Phillies	14‍–‍8	Phillies, 8‍–‍3	Phillies, 6‍–‍5	Pirates; 724‍–‍570‍–‍6	Phillies lose 1950 World Series
1951	Phillies	15‍–‍7	Phillies, 6‍–‍5	Phillies, 9‍–‍2	Pirates; 731‍–‍585‍–‍6	
1952	Phillies	16‍–‍6	Phillies, 10‍–‍1	Phillies, 6‍–‍5	Pirates; 737‍–‍601‍–‍6	
1953	Phillies	15‍–‍7	Phillies, 9‍–‍2	Phillies, 6‍–‍5	Pirates; 744‍–‍616‍–‍6	
1954	Phillies	16‍–‍6	Phillies, 7‍–‍4	Phillies, 9‍–‍2	Pirates; 750‍–‍632‍–‍6	
1955	Phillies	15‍–‍7	Phillies, 7‍–‍4	Phillies, 8‍–‍3	Pirates; 757‍–‍647‍–‍6	
1956	Pirates	15‍–‍7	Pirates, 7‍–‍4	Pirates, 8‍–‍3	Pirates; 772‍–‍654‍–‍6	
1957	Phillies	13‍–‍9	Phillies, 7‍–‍4	Phillies, 6‍–‍5	Pirates; 781‍–‍667‍–‍6	
1958	Phillies	12‍–‍10	Phillies, 7‍–‍4	Pirates, 6‍–‍5	Pirates; 791‍–‍679‍–‍6	Phillies' Shibe Park renamed Connie Mack Stadium
1959	Pirates	13‍–‍9	Pirates, 6‍–‍5	Pirates, 7‍–‍4	Pirates; 804‍–‍688‍–‍6	

1960s (Pirates, 98‍–‍89)

Season	Season series		at Philadelphia Phillies	at Pittsburgh Pirates	Overall series	Notes
1960	Pirates	15‍–‍7	Pirates, 7‍–‍4	Pirates, 8‍–‍3	Pirates; 819‍–‍695‍–‍6	Pirates win 1960 World Series
1961	Pirates	15‍–‍7	Pirates, 9‍–‍2	Pirates, 6‍–‍5	Pirates; 834‍–‍702‍–‍6	
1962	Pirates	10‍–‍7	Tie, 4‍–‍4	Pirates, 6‍–‍3	Pirates; 844‍–‍709‍–‍6	NL expansion reduces schedule to 18 meetings per year.
1963	Phillies	13‍–‍5	Phillies, 5‍–‍4	Phillies, 8‍–‍1	Pirates; 849‍–‍722‍–‍6	
1964	Phillies	10‍–‍8	Phillies, 7‍–‍2	Pirates, 6‍–‍3	Pirates; 857‍–‍732‍–‍6	
1965	Pirates	10‍–‍8	Phillies, 5‍–‍4	Pirates, 6‍–‍3	Pirates; 867‍–‍740‍–‍6	
1966	Phillies	10‍–‍8	Pirates, 5‍–‍4	Phillies, 6‍–‍3	Pirates; 875‍–‍750‍–‍6	
1967	Pirates	10‍–‍8	Phillies, 6‍–‍3	Pirates, 7‍–‍2	Pirates; 885‍–‍758‍–‍6	
1968	Tie	9‍–‍9	Pirates, 6‍–‍3	Phillies, 6‍–‍3	Pirates; 894‍–‍767‍–‍6	
1969	Phillies	10‍–‍8	Phillies, 5‍–‍4	Phillies, 5‍–‍4	Pirates; 902‍–‍777‍–‍6	

1970s (Pirates, 101–79)

Season	Season series		at Philadelphia Phillies	at Pittsburgh Pirates	Overall series	Notes
1970	Pirates	14‍–‍4	Pirates, 6‍–‍3	Pirates, 8‍–‍1	Pirates; 916‍–‍781‍–‍6	Phillies open Veterans Stadium; Pirates open Three Rivers Stadium
1971	Pirates	12‍–‍6	Pirates, 6‍–‍3	Pirates, 6‍–‍3	Pirates; 928‍–‍787‍–‍6	Pirates win 1971 World Series
1972	Pirates	13‍–‍5	Pirates, 6‍–‍3	Pirates, 7‍–‍2	Pirates; 941‍–‍792‍–‍6	
1973	Pirates	10‍–‍8	Pirates, 6‍–‍3	Phillies, 5‍–‍4	Pirates; 951‍–‍800‍–‍6	
1974	Phillies	10‍–‍8	Phillies, 8‍–‍1	Pirates, 7‍–‍2	Pirates; 959‍–‍810‍–‍6	
1975	Phillies	11‍–‍7	Phillies, 8‍–‍1	Pirates, 6‍–‍3	Pirates; 966‍–‍821‍–‍6	
1976	Pirates	10‍–‍8	Pirates, 5‍–‍4	Pirates, 5‍–‍4	Pirates; 976‍–‍829‍–‍6	
1977	Pirates	10‍–‍8	Phillies, 7‍–‍2	Pirates, 8‍–‍1	Pirates; 986‍–‍837‍–‍6	
1978	Phillies	11‍–‍7	Phillies, 6‍–‍3	Phillies, 5‍–‍4	Pirates; 993‍–‍848‍–‍6	
1979	Pirates	10‍–‍8	Phillies, 5‍–‍4	Pirates, 6‍–‍3	Pirates; 1,003‍–‍856‍–‍6	Pirates win 1979 World Series

1980s (Phillies, 91–83–1)

Season	Season series		at Philadelphia Phillies	at Pittsburgh Pirates	Overall series	Notes
1980	Pirates	11‍–‍7	Phillies, 5‍–‍4	Pirates, 7‍–‍2	Pirates; 1,014‍–‍863‍–‍6	Phillies win 1980 World Series
1981	Phillies	7‍–‍5	Phillies, 5‍–‍1	Pirates, 4‍–‍2	Pirates; 1,019‍–‍870‍–‍6	Strike-shortened season.
1982	Tie	9‍–‍9	Pirates, 5‍–‍4	Phillies, 5‍–‍4	Pirates; 1,028‍–‍879‍–‍6	
1983	Phillies	11‍–‍7	Phillies, 6‍–‍3	Phillies, 5‍–‍4	Pirates; 1,035‍–‍890‍–‍6	Phillies lose 1983 World Series
1984	Pirates	11‍–‍7	Pirates, 5‍–‍4	Pirates, 6‍–‍3	Pirates; 1,046‍–‍897‍–‍6	
1985	Phillies	11‍–‍7	Phillies, 6‍–‍3	Phillies, 5‍–‍4	Pirates; 1,053‍–‍908‍–‍6	
1986	Phillies	11‍–‍7	Phillies, 6‍–‍3	Phillies, 5‍–‍4	Pirates; 1,060‍–‍919‍–‍6	
1987	Phillies	11‍–‍7	Phillies, 6‍–‍3	Phillies, 5‍–‍4	Pirates; 1,067‍–‍930‍–‍6	
1988	Pirates	11‍–‍7	Pirates, 5‍–‍4	Pirates, 6‍–‍3	Pirates; 1,078‍–‍937‍–‍6	
1989	Phillies	10‍–‍8‍–‍1	Phillies, 7‍–‍2‍–‍1	Pirates, 6‍–‍3	Pirates; 1,086‍–‍947‍–‍6	

1990s (Pirates, 66–58)

Season	Season series		at Philadelphia Phillies	at Pittsburgh Pirates	Overall series	Notes
1990	Pirates	12‍–‍6	Pirates, 6‍–‍3	Pirates, 6‍–‍3	Pirates; 1,098‍–‍953‍–‍6	
1991	Pirates	12‍–‍6	Pirates, 5‍–‍4	Pirates, 7‍–‍2	Pirates; 1,110‍–‍959‍–‍6	
1992	Pirates	13‍–‍5	Pirates, 5‍–‍4	Pirates, 8‍–‍1	Pirates; 1,123‍–‍964‍–‍6	
1993	Phillies	7‍–‍6	Phillies, 4‍–‍2	Pirates, 4‍–‍3	Pirates; 1,129‍–‍971‍–‍6	Phillies lose 1993 World Series
1994	Phillies	5‍–‍4	Phillies, 5‍–‍2	Pirates, 2‍–‍0	Pirates; 1,133‍–‍976‍–‍6	Strike-shortened season
1995	Phillies	6‍–‍3	Phillies, 4‍–‍1	Tie, 2‍–‍2	Pirates; 1,136‍–‍982‍–‍6	Strike-shortened season
1996	Phillies	7‍–‍5	Phillies, 4‍–‍2	Tie, 3‍–‍3	Pirates; 1,141‍–‍989‍–‍6	
1997	Pirates	6‍–‍5	Tie, 3‍–‍3	Pirates, 3‍–‍2	Pirates; 1,147‍–‍994‍–‍6	
1998	Phillies	8‍–‍1	Phillies, 5‍–‍1	Phillies, 3‍–‍0	Pirates; 1,148‍–‍1,002‍–‍6	
1999	Pirates	4‍–‍3	Phillies, 2‍–‍1	Pirates, 3‍–‍1	Pirates; 1,152‍–‍1,005‍–‍6	

2000s (Phillies, 34–30)

Season	Season series		at Philadelphia Phillies	at Pittsburgh Pirates	Overall series	Notes
2000	Pirates	6‍–‍3	Pirates, 4‍–‍2	Pirates, 2‍–‍1	Pirates; 1,158‍–‍1,008‍–‍6	
2001	Phillies	5‍–‍1	Phillies, 3‍–‍0	Phillies, 2‍–‍1	Pirates; 1,159‍–‍1,013‍–‍6	Pirates open PNC Park
2002	Pirates	4‍–‍2	Phillies, 2‍–‍1	Pirates, 3‍–‍0	Pirates; 1,163‍–‍1,015‍–‍6	
2003	Pirates	4‍–‍2	Pirates, 2‍–‍1	Pirates, 2‍–‍1	Pirates; 1,167‍–‍1,017‍–‍6	
2004	Tie	3‍–‍3	Phillies, 2‍–‍1	Pirates, 2‍–‍1	Pirates; 1,170‍–‍1,020‍–‍6	
2005	Phillies	4‍–‍3	Phillies, 2‍–‍1	Tie, 2‍–‍2	Pirates; 1,173‍–‍1,024‍–‍6	
2006	Tie	3‍–‍3	Phillies, 2‍–‍1	Pirates, 2‍–‍1	Pirates; 1176‍–‍1027‍–‍6	
2007	Phillies	4‍–‍2	Phillies, 3‍–‍0	Pirates, 2‍–‍1	Pirates; 1,178‍–‍1,031‍–‍6	
2008	Phillies	4‍–‍2	Phillies, 2‍–‍1	Phillies, 2‍–‍1	Pirates; 1,180‍–‍1,035‍–‍6	Phillies win 2008 World Series
2009	Phillies	4‍–‍2	Phillies, 3‍–‍0	Pirates, 2‍–‍1	Pirates; 1,182‍–‍1,039‍–‍6	Phillies lose 2009 World Series

2010s (Pirates, 37‍–‍30)

Season	Season series		at Philadelphia Phillies	at Pittsburgh Pirates	Overall series	Notes
2010	Pirates	4‍–‍2	Tie, 1‍–‍1	Pirates, 3‍–‍1	Pirates; 1,186‍–‍1,041‍–‍6	
2011	Phillies	4‍–‍2	Phillies, 3‍–‍0	Pirates, 2‍–‍1	Pirates; 1,188‍–‍1,045‍–‍6	
2012	Pirates	4‍–‍3	Tie, 2‍–‍2	Pirates, 2‍–‍1	Pirates; 1,192‍–‍1,048‍–‍6	
2013	Pirates	4‍–‍3	Pirates, 3‍–‍1	Phillies, 2‍–‍1	Pirates; 1196‍–‍1051‍–‍9	
2014	Pirates	6‍–‍1	Pirates, 3‍–‍1	Pirates, 3‍–‍0	Pirates; 1,202‍–‍1,052‍–‍9	
2015	Pirates	5‍–‍2	Tie, 2‍–‍2	Pirates, 3‍–‍0	Pirates; 1,207‍–‍1,054‍–‍9	
2016	Pirates	4‍–‍3	Tie, 2‍–‍2	Pirates, 2‍–‍1	Pirates; 1,211‍–‍1,057‍–‍9	
2017	Pirates	5‍–‍2	Pirates, 3‍–‍1	Pirates, 2‍–‍1	Pirates; 1,216‍–‍1,059‍–‍9	
2018	Phillies	6‍–‍1	Phillies, 4‍–‍0	Phillies, 2‍–‍1	Pirates; 1,217‍–‍1,065‍–‍9	
2019	Phillies	4‍–‍2	Phillies, 2‍–‍1	Phillies, 2‍–‍1	Pirates; 1,219‍–‍1,069‍–‍9	

2020s (Phillies, 24–16)

Season	Season series		at Philadelphia Phillies	at Pittsburgh Pirates	Overall series	Notes
2021	Phillies	4‍–‍3	Phillies, 3‍–‍1	Pirates, 2‍–‍1	Pirates; 1,222‍–‍1,073‍–‍9	
2022	Phillies	6‍–‍1	Phillies, 2‍–‍1	Phillies, 4‍–‍0	Pirates; 1,223‍–‍1,079‍–‍9	Phillies lose 2022 World Series
2023	Tie	3‍–‍3	Phillies, 2‍–‍1	Pirates, 2‍–‍1	Pirates; 1,226‍–‍1,082‍–‍9	
2024	Pirates	4‍–‍3	Tie, 2‍–‍2	Pirates, 2‍–‍1	Pirates; 1,230‍–‍1,085‍–‍9	
2025	Tie	3‍–‍3	Phillies, 3‍–‍0	Pirates, 3‍–‍0	Pirates; 1,233‍–‍1,088‍–‍9	
2026	Phillies	5‍–‍2	Tie, 2‍–‍2	Phillies, 3‍–‍0	Pirates; 1,235‍–‍1,093‍–‍9	

Summary of Results

Season	Season series		at Philadelphia Phillies	at Pittsburgh Pirates	Notes
Regular season games	Pirates	1,235‍–‍1,093‍–‍9	Phillies, 618‍–‍554‍–‍6	Pirates, 681‍–‍472‍–‍3	

== See also ==
- Major League Baseball rivalries
- Eagles–Steelers rivalry
- Flyers–Penguins rivalry
