= Flyers–Penguins rivalry =

National Hockey League rivalry

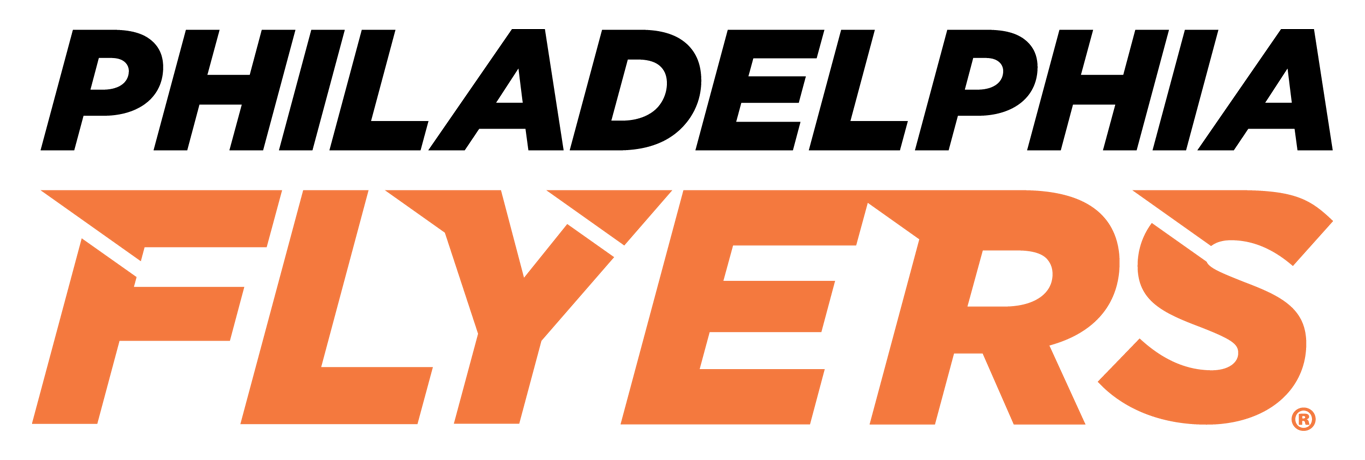
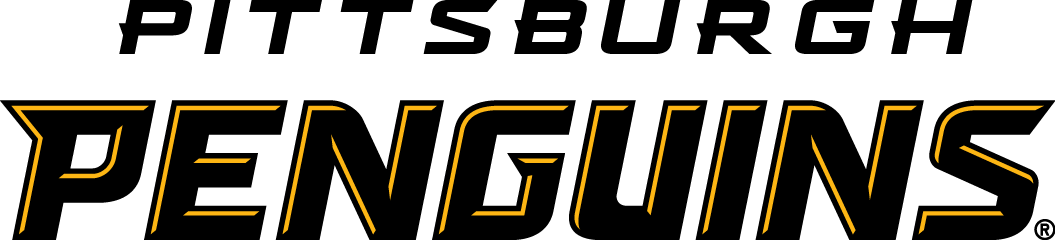
- Philadelphia Flyers Pittsburgh Penguins
- First meeting: October 19, 1967
- Latest meeting: September 30, 2026
- Next meeting: January 31, 2027

Statistics
- Total meetings: 367
- All-time series: 194–129–30–14 (PHI)
- Regular season series: 169–107–30–14 (PHI)
- Postseason results: 25–22 (PHI)
- Largest victory: PHI 11–0 PIT; October 20, 1977
- Longest win streak: PHI W11
- Current win streak: PIT W1

Postseason history
- 1989 division finals: Flyers won, 4–3; 1997 conference quarterfinals: Flyers won, 4–1; 2000 conference semifinals: Flyers won, 4–2; 2008 conference finals: Penguins won, 4–1; 2009 conference quarterfinals: Penguins won, 4–2; 2012 conference quarterfinals: Flyers won, 4–2; 2018 first round: Penguins won, 4–2; 2026 first round: Flyers won, 4–2

The Flyers–Penguins rivalry, also known as the Battle of Pennsylvania, is a National Hockey League (NHL) rivalry between the Philadelphia Flyers and Pittsburgh Penguins. Both teams compete in the Metropolitan Division of the Eastern Conference. The rivalry began in 1967, when teams were introduced into the NHL's "Next Six" expansion wave. The rivalry exists due to divisional alignment and geographic location, as both teams play in the state of Pennsylvania. The Flyers and Penguins met in the Stanley Cup playoffs four times in 11 years from 2008 to 2018, strengthening the rivalry.

== History ==
=== Early days ===
The first meeting between the Flyers and Penguins occurred on October 19, 1967, in the first-ever game at the Philadelphia Spectrum. Flyers goaltender Doug Favell stopped all 17 Pittsburgh shots and Bill Sutherland scored the lone goal 2:59 into the third period for a 1–0 Flyers win.

The rivalry was not as strong in earlier years, as the Penguins struggled in the NHL until the arrival of Mario Lemieux in 1984–85. The Flyers achieved just the opposite, winning back-to-back Stanley Cups in 1974 and 1975. When the NHL realigned divisions prior to the 1974–75 season, the two Pennsylvania teams were moved to separate divisions. The Penguins spent the next seven seasons in the Norris Division and became the Flyers' division rivals once again upon joining the Patrick Division in 1981–82.

=== Arrival of Mario Lemieux ===
After years of underperformance, the arrival of Mario Lemieux in Pittsburgh gave the Penguins respectability in the NHL. In 1988–89, the Flyers and the Penguins met for the first time in the playoffs in the Patrick Division finals.

The series proved to be a turning point for both franchises. The Flyers missed the playoffs for the next five seasons, while the Penguins became an annual contender with such stars as Lemieux, Jaromír Jágr, Ron Francis, and Larry Murphy. The Penguins peaked with two Stanley Cup championships in 1991 and 1992, having missed the 1990 playoffs.

=== Eric Lindros, Jaromír Jágr and the 1990s ===
The rivalry continued during the 1990s with the arrival of Eric Lindros in Philadelphia, which gave the Flyers a counterbalance against Lemieux. Further divisional realignment split the teams up again in 1993–94, and the Penguins spent the next five seasons in the Northeast Division. Lindros and Jágr were tied for 70 points; the League scoring lead in 1994–95, but Jágr won the Art Ross Trophy for having scored three more goals than Lindros (32 to 29). Lindros, however, won the Hart Memorial Trophy that season as League MVP, with Lemieux winning it the following season in 1995–96, with Lindros as first runner-up. During that same season, the Flyers won the Eastern Conference's crown by one point in the standings, despite Pittsburgh having 49 wins to Philadelphia's 45. The two teams met again in the playoffs, in the 1997 Eastern Conference quarterfinals. The Flyers won in five games, and Lemieux subsequently retired for the first time at the end of the series. After game five, Lemieux skated around the ice and received a standing ovation from the Philadelphia crowd. He previously received a standing ovation from the Philadelphia crowd in March 1993 after returning from radiation treatments.

One of the most memorable moments of the rivalry occurred during the 1999–2000 season when the two teams met in the Eastern Conference semifinals. A season after the Penguins joined the Atlantic Division, the Flyers had won the Division with the best record in the East, while the Penguins made the playoffs as the seventh seed. Despite this, the Penguins jumped out to a 2–0 series lead, winning both games in Philadelphia. The Flyers won game three in overtime, but NHL history was made in game four. Tied at 1–1, the game stretched to five overtime periods and set the record for the longest game played in the modern era of the NHL. Keith Primeau's goal at the 92:01 mark of overtime (152:01 overall) gave the Flyers a 2–1 win and a 2–2 split in the series. The outcome energized the Flyers and demoralized the Penguins, as the Flyers won the next two games and the series.

=== Rivalry in the 21st century ===
The rivalry between the two teams lost its luster in the years leading up to the 2004–05 NHL lockout, as the Penguins struggled on-and-off the ice, dropping to the bottom of the League standings.

In 2006–07, the Penguins defeated the Flyers in all eight matchups between the two teams, and Penguins goaltender Marc-André Fleury became the first goaltender to defeat a team eight times in a season since 1967–68. The Flyers have swept the season series three times, winning all four games during the 1980–81 season, all seven games during the 1983–84 season, and all four games during the 2014–15 season. During the 2007–08 season, the Flyers won five games and the Penguins won three in the season series. The series was highlighted by an 8–2 win by the Flyers and a 7–1 win by the Penguins. The Penguins and the Flyers faced off in the 2008 Eastern Conference finals, won by the Penguins in five games for the Penguins' first-ever playoff series win against the Flyers. A year later, in the 2009 Eastern Conference quarterfinals, the Penguins beat the Flyers again, winning the series 4–2 on their way to winning the Stanley Cup.

In the 2010–11 season opener, Philadelphia traveled to Pittsburgh to open the Penguins new arena, the Consol Energy Center, on October 7. Rookie goaltender Sergei Bobrovsky made his NHL debut, leading the Flyers to a 3–2 victory. Flyers forward Daniel Brière scored the first NHL goal in the new building, and Penguins forward Tyler Kennedy scored the first Penguins goal.

On July 1, 2011, the Flyers signed former Penguins Jaromír Jágr and Maxime Talbot to a one-year, $3.3 million deal and a five-year, $9 million deal, respectively. Whilst playing for Pittsburgh two years earlier, Talbot scored both goals in the Penguins' Cup-clinching game seven win against the Detroit Red Wings in 2009.

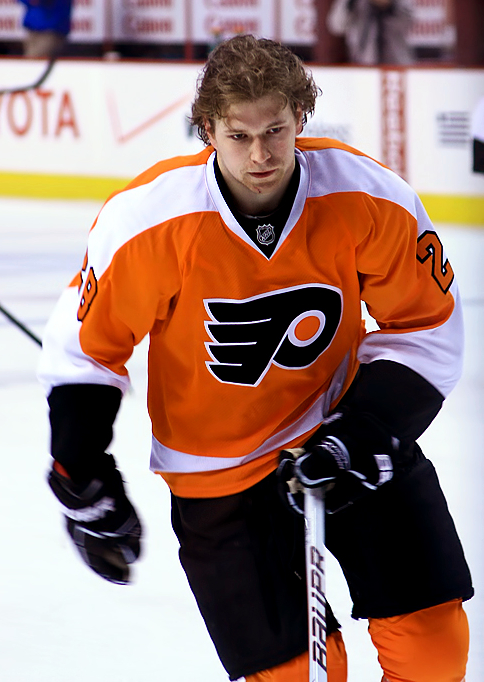
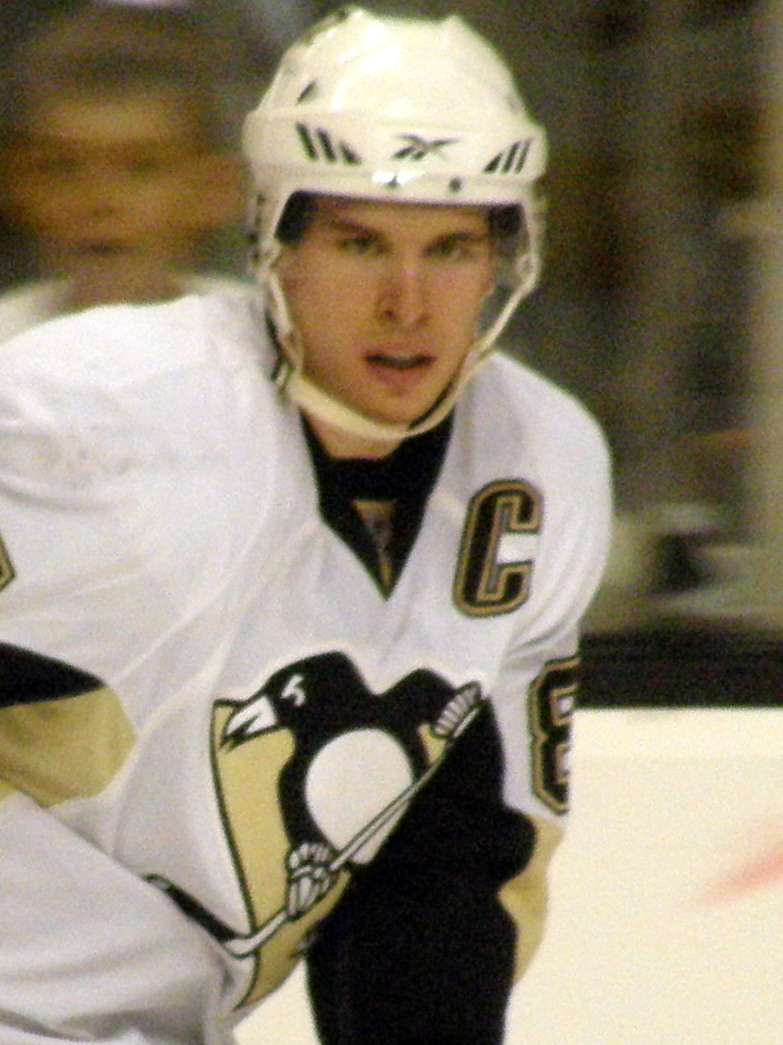
Claude Giroux (2011) and Sidney Crosby (2010)

The rivalry between the two teams briefly became an alliance late in 2011, when Commissioner Gary Bettman and the NHL began discussions for league realignment from six divisions to four. One proposal would have resulted in separating the Penguins and Flyers into different divisions and lowering their in-season matchups from six to two. Members of both organizations actively spoke against breaking up the two teams, citing the importance of the rivalry to the teams, the fans, as well as the state of Pennsylvania. When the re-aligned conferences were unveiled later that year, both teams were placed in the eventually-named Metropolitan Division, ensuring the rivalry's continuation.

On April 1, 2012, the Flyers and Penguins were involved in a late-game skirmish at Consol Energy Center. The game, which the Flyers won 6–4, was highlighted by Flyers head coach Peter Laviolette and Penguins assistant coach Tony Granato standing atop the boards and engaged in a verbal altercation. Both were eventually fined by the NHL. On April 7, the Penguins defeated the Flyers for the first time in six games at Consol Energy Center, winning 4–2.

The teams met again in the 2012 Eastern Conference quarterfinals, their third meeting in five seasons. The Flyers won the series in six games. The teams combined for an NHL-record 45 goals in the first four games, as well as combining for 309 penalty minutes (158 of which were in Philadelphia's 8–4 game three victory, which put them ahead 3–0 in the series) throughout the fight-filled, six-game series.

The rivalry once again received significant attention by the end of the 2010s with two NHL Stadium Series games between the two teams in 2017 and 2019 to celebrate both teams' 50th anniversaries, plus another playoff series between the two teams during the 2018 Eastern Conference first round. In the 2017 NHL Stadium Series, set at Pittsburgh's Heinz Field, the Penguins defeated the Flyers 4–2. In the 2019 NHL Stadium Series, set at Philadelphia's Lincoln Financial Field, the Flyers bested the Penguins in a 4–3 overtime victory, rallying from a seemingly insurmountable 3–1 deficit in the final frame with two extra attacker goals.

Between these two outdoor matches, the Penguins also defeated the Flyers in their 2018 playoff clash, four games to two, following a season sweep courtesy of Pittsburgh. The first four games of the series were all lopsided, including a 7–0 win by Pittsburgh in game one, a 5–1 win by Philadelphia in game two, a 5–1 win by Pittsburgh in game three, and a 5–0 win by Pittsburgh in game four. The next two games were much closer. Game five saw a 4–2 Philadelphia win, with Sean Couturier scoring the game-winning goal with just over a minute left in regulation. The Penguins clinched the series with an 8–5 win in game six at Philadelphia. Jake Guentzel tallied four goals in the game for the Penguins, while Sean Couturier tallied three goals and two assists. The series saw 43 total goals.

Entering the 2020s, both franchises began to experience decline. The Flyers missed the playoffs for five consecutive seasons from 2020–21 to 2024–25, and the Penguins missed the playoffs for three consecutive seasons from 2022–23 to 2024–25. In 2026, both teams returned to the playoffs and renewed their rivalry by matching up in the Eastern Conference first round. The series played out in similar form to the 2012 playoff meeting between the two, with the Flyers jumping out to a 3–0 series lead and eliminating the Penguins in six games; game six was scoreless through regulation before Cam York scored the game's lone goal late in overtime to win the series for the Flyers.

== See also ==
- List of NHL rivalries
- Eagles–Steelers rivalry
- Phillies–Pirates rivalry
