= Steagles =

1943 temporary NFL team season

1943 Philadelphia-Pittsburgh Eagles-Steelers season
- Owner: Alexis Thompson, Art Rooney & Bert Bell
- Head coach: Greasy Neale and Walt Kiesling
- Home stadium: Shibe Park, Forbes Field

Results
- Record: 5–4–1
- Division place: 3rd NFL Eastern
- Playoffs: Did not qualify

The Steagles, officially known as the Phil-Pitt Combine, was the team created by the temporary merger of Pennsylvania's two National Football League (NFL) teams, the Pittsburgh Steelers and the Philadelphia Eagles, during the 1943 season. The two franchises, due to both having many players leave for military service during World War II, were compelled to field a single combined team. The league's official record book refers to the team as the "Phil-Pitt Combine", but the unofficial and portmanteau variation of the "Steagles", despite never being registered by the NFL, has become the enduring moniker.

== History ==
The prospect of a unified Pittsburgh-Philadelphia team actually predated World War II by several years. The Pennsylvania Keystoners were a team that was proposed in 1939, conceived with the intention of the Steelers and Eagles owners buying into one of the two teams, then spinning the other off to an ownership group in Boston, Massachusetts. League officials rejected the plan, though it resulted in a convoluted ownership "two-step" that left Eagles owner Bert Bell with a share in the Steelers franchise.

America entered World War II on December 7, 1941, with the Japanese attack on Pearl Harbor. Most of the young men who were of the age to play professional football were also of the age to fight for their country. Six hundred NFL players joined the armed forces.

With the country now at war, President Franklin D. Roosevelt esteemed entertainment and sports as a much-needed diversion. He issued an inspirational letter to Commissioner of Baseball Kenesaw Mountain Landis which focused on the importance of Major League Baseball to Americans' morale. The address made no mention of football, as baseball was still widely referred to as America's pastime and had not yet been surpassed in popularity by football. However at its 1943 annual spring meeting, the NFL decided to follow baseball's lead and continue play. Other football leagues, such as the 1940–41 American Football League, Dixie League and the American Association, decided to suspend operations instead, leaving the NFL and its West Coast counterpart, the Pacific Coast Professional Football League, as the only leagues playing professional football at the time.

=== Draft deferments ===
The young men who remained in the States to play football were mostly those who were deferred from the draft. The Steagles players were either unfit for military service for physical or dependency reasons, age, or were active servicemen who had obtained leave to play. Three types of draft deferments defined 1943 NFL players. The first group was called III-A. If a man had persons dependent upon him for support, such as a wife, parent, grandparent, brother, or sister, the draft board would not make him a priority until other possible candidates had been taken. In late 1943, with increasing manpower requirements, the government defined a man classified as III-A as a married father whose child or children was born or conceived prior to the attack on Pearl Harbor. The cutoff date for birth was September 15, 1942, precisely nine months and one week after Pearl Harbor. The second group of draft deferments, II-As, II-Bs, and II-Cs, consisted of those men who worked in critical civilian occupations, war industries producing and preparing ammunition, weapons and materials, or agriculture. The third group (IV-Fs), were those men deemed unfit for military service due to ailments such as chronic ulcers, improperly-healed injuries, defects of the extremities, bad hearing, and partial blindness.

Most NFL football players wanted to do their patriotic duty and serve their country, and for a man fit to play football, an IV-F classification was an embarrassment.

Many men could lead normal lives and even play football, but the military had deemed them unfit; numerous NFL players in 1943 had medical problems that kept them out of the military. Tony Bova, the Steagles' leading receiver with 17 receptions, was blind in one eye and partially blind in the other. Steagles guard Eddie Michaels was nearly deaf and center Ray Graves was deaf in one ear. One starting defensive end was blind in one eye and nearly legally blind in the other. The Steagles tailback John Butler made his first start one day after being classified IV-F by his draft board for poor eyesight and bad knees. Placekicker and punter Troy Smith had a prosthetic leg.

1943 Steagles starting line-up Back row (left to right): John Wilcox, back (#11); Ben Kish, back (#44); Ernie Steele, halfback (#37) Middle row: Roy Zimmerman, quarterback (#7) Front row (left to right): Larry Cabrelli, end (#84); Bucko Kilroy, tackle (#76); Eddie Michaels, guard (#60); Ray Graves, center (#52); Elbie Schultz, guard (#71); Vic Sears, tackle (#79); Bob Masters, end (#31)

=== 1943 NFL spring meetings ===
Even with these deferments, NFL rosters were hurting. The Cleveland Rams suspended operations and the Pittsburgh Steelers had only six men left under contract while the Philadelphia Eagles had only sixteen. The 1943 NFL draft did not help much. Most players drafted went off to the war instead of joining NFL teams. Further exacerbating the issue was the continued insistence of George Preston Marshall and other NFL owners on continuing the ten-year-old ban on black players, which disqualified potential replacement players such as Kenny Washington.

Steelers' owner Art Rooney's idea was to merge the Steelers with the Eagles. In 1974, Rooney said "it was done out of necessity." This idea came quickly to him since two years earlier he thought about combining the two teams into the Pennsylvania Keystoners. Eagles' owner Alexis Thompson, who was serving in the US Army as a corporal, was not as keen on the plan since he at least had 16 players under contract. However, Thompson remembered how Rooney in 1941 swapped cities with him which allowed him to keep the Eagles in Philadelphia close to his New York City home. This led to an agreement on combining the teams.

The league approved the merger by a vote of 5–4. However, several owners expressed fears that the merger would produce a team with an unfair advantage. Al Wistert, a future Hall of Fame player, felt that since both teams had losing records, all the merger accomplished was, "We had twice as many lousy players". The merger had a slight lean in favor of Philadelphia based on stipulations imposed by Thompson. The team would be known as the Philadelphia Eagles and be based in Philadelphia. Rooney had very little leverage, bringing only six players to the table. However, he was successful in landing two home games in Pittsburgh, while Philadelphia would host four. The team was also to wear the Eagles' green and white colors instead of Pittsburgh's black and gold. This event officially marked the only time in the Steelers history (other than in 1941 when green and white were used as well as black and gold) that the team colors were something other than black and gold. The league also stated that helmets were mandated for the first time and that the league would expand in 1944 with the Boston Yanks paying $50,000 for entry into the league.

=== 1943 season ===
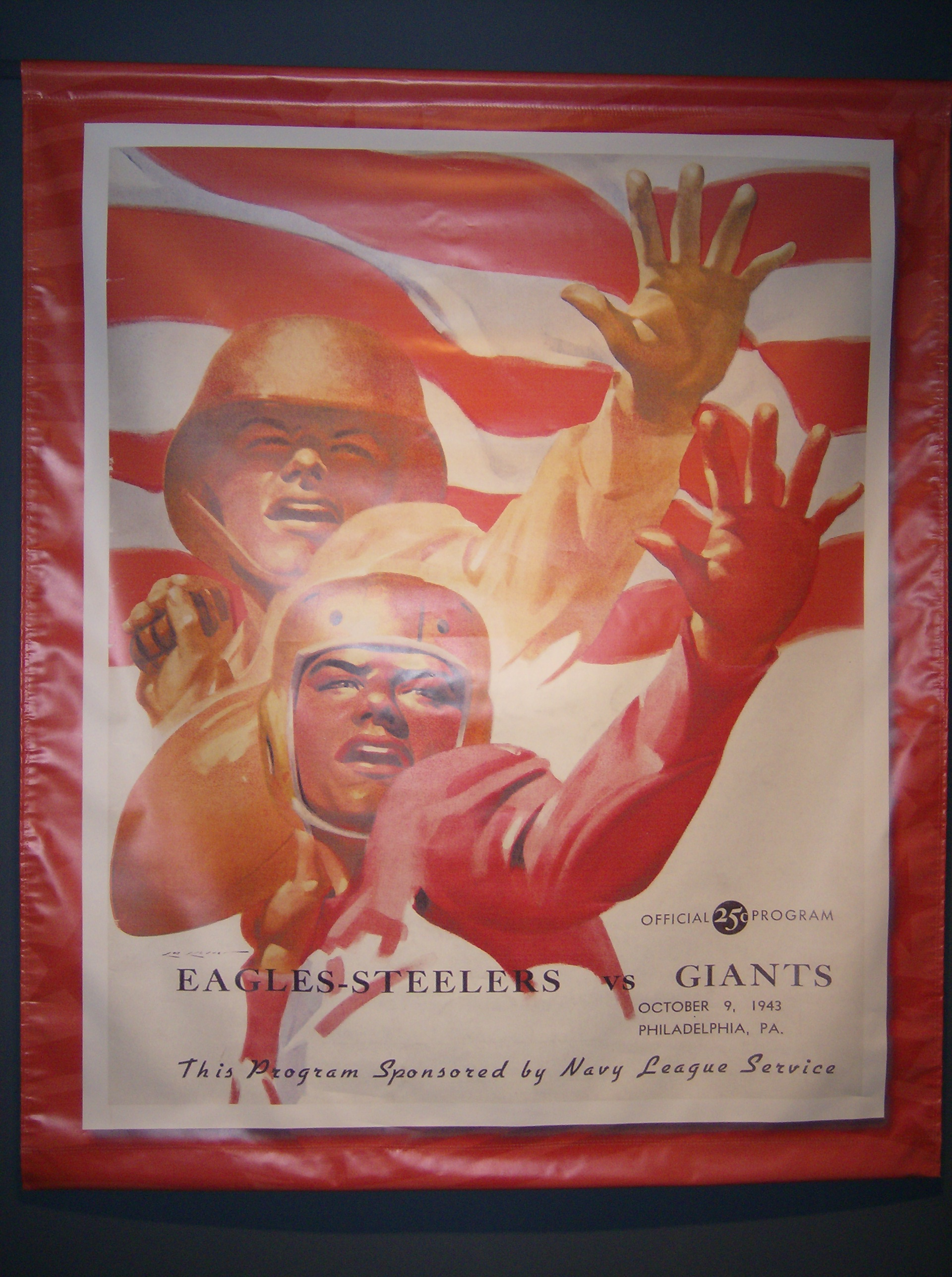
Pittsburgh-Philadelphia "Steagles" vs. New York Giants at Shibe Park October 9, 1943

Philadelphia's Greasy Neale and Pittsburgh's Walt Kiesling would be co-head coaches because each coach refused to be demoted. This led to several problems: the first being that the two men hated each other. Eagles player Frank "Bucko" Kilroy said "They didn't like each other at all." Secondly, Kiesling's own players did not like him; so asking the Eagles players to like him was too much to ask. However, Neale took advantage when Kiesling was delayed en route to camp which was held at St. Joseph's College in Philadelphia. By the time Keisling arrived, Neale already had the offense learning the T-formation, successfully used in college football by both Frank Leahy at Notre Dame and Red Blaik at Army. This conflict led to Neale serving as the team's offensive coordinator; while Kiesling served as the defensive coordinator. They would then split head coaching duties. According to defensive back Ernie Steele, the situation between the two coaches got so bad that Kiesling and Neale walked off the field after a heated argument during practice before a game. They returned for the game; but the players were nonetheless stunned. However, after the Steagles' in 1943 and Card-Pitt in 1944, Pittsburgh reverted to using the single-wing formation through 1952, becoming the last NFL team to ever use it as its primary offensive set.

Another difficult issue at the time was that the Steelers and Eagles were bitter intrastate rivals (much like the NHL's Pittsburgh Penguins-Philadelphia Flyers rivalry of today) and usually both teams ended up near the bottom of the standings each year. The Steagles were the only professional sports team where all the players held full-time war jobs as it was a requirement of the team. Playing football was seen as an extracurricular activity. All of the 22 players on the roster kept full-time jobs in defense plants. One of Pittsburgh's players, Ted Doyle, worked at Westinghouse Electric and figured out later that his work assisted the Manhattan Project, which was America's effort to build the first atomic bomb, according to Matthew Algeo's book Last Team Standing.

As the season got underway, fans and newspapers began calling the team the Steagles, a combination of Steelers and Eagles. It had a nice ring to it and was fair to both cities. Steagles eventually became the common name used for the team throughout most of the country, except in Philadelphia, where the writers and even the team insisted on being called the Philadelphia Eagles. Chet Smith, the sports editor of the Pittsburgh Press, was initially the one who wrote in a column the moniker Steagles for the merged team, in a June 23, 1943 column.

Slowly, the team began to come together, and jumped out to a 2–0 start after defeating the Brooklyn Dodgers and New York Giants at Shibe Park. Against New York, the Steagles fumbled ten times (still an NFL record as of 2021), but managed to win 28–14. The team stumbled on the road, though, and after seven games sported a 3–3–1 mark, with their third win and the tie coming against the defending-champion Washington Redskins; the team regrouped with two at Pittsburgh's Forbes Field, against the Chicago Cardinals on Halloween Night and over the Detroit Lions on Nov. 21. Going into the season's final week, the 5-3-1 Steagles, with still a shot at the division championship, met Don Hutson and the Green Bay Packers in front of 35,000 fans at Shibe Park. Green Bay would go on to win the game 38–28, however, putting Phil-Pitt at 5-4-1, one game behind Washington and New York.

== Aftermath ==
=== Legacy ===
The Steagles 1943 season was the Philadelphia franchise's first winning season in its history and the second for Pittsburgh's.

The next season, 1944, the NFL was back on solid footing. The Army had declared that it had enough soldiers and men over 26 years of age would not be drafted, though the league had another problem. With the Cleveland Rams back in operation, the expansion Boston Yanks team in the fold and the Eagles and Steelers back in their separate ways, the NFL had 11 teams, which created a nightmare with divisions and scheduling. NFL Commissioner Elmer Layden begged for two teams to combine again in 1944. Ten teams made for a perfect league and eleven seemed impossible. The Steelers were still short of players due to the war. Pittsburgh owner Art Rooney was unhappy with the "Phil-Pitt" arrangement, but wanted to keep it intact. However, Philadelphia refused. The team merged with the Chicago Cardinals for the 1944 season, creating a team known as Card-Pitt. This "Card-Pitt" team was derisively called "carpet" due to going winless, and the commentary that "every team walked all over them". The war ended by the time the 1945 NFL season started, and with the Brooklyn Tigers and the aforementioned Boston franchise permanently merging, there was an even number of ten teams to the delight of owners.

The Eagles, now having enough players back from the war, resumed their traditional operation and continued under Neale, who took home back-to-back coach of the year awards as Philadelphia won consecutive NFL championships in 1948 and 1949.

Individually, the Steagles' Jack Hinkle ended the season with 571 rushing yards. He lost the rushing title to New York's Bill Paschal by one yard. Against those very Giants Hinkle was not given credit for a 37-yard run (they gave it to John Butler). Hinkle did not complain about not winning the NFL rushing crown. Tony Bova, a half-blind 4-F, led the team in receiving with 417 yards.

=== In popular culture ===
The 1971 film The Steagle starring Richard Benjamin takes its name from the Steagles football team. In the opening scene, the protagonist of the film, a bookish college professor, explains the history and meaning of the term to a pair of loudly arguing sports fans on a commuter train, and draws an admiring look from an Asian woman who is a fellow passenger. The film concerns the personality change which overcomes the protagonist during the Cuban Missile Crisis of 1962, and the film's title implicitly references the transient nature of the Steagles team, existing for only one brief season during a national crisis.

=== 60th anniversary ===
The Steelers celebrated the 60th anniversary of the Steagles on August 17, 2003, during the pregame and halftime ceremonies at Heinz Field.

Six of the nine surviving members of that team were honored at halftime. Those members were quarterback Allie Sherman, running back and defensive back Ernie Steele, center Ray Graves, and tackles Al Wistert, Vic Sears, and Bucko Kilroy. End Tom Miller, tackle Ted Doyle and halfback John Hinkle were unable to attend. Wistert was the last surviving player of the combine and died in 2016. All three of the surviving players belonged to the Eagles. Ted Doyle, who died in 2006, was the last surviving Steeler player from the team.

In addition, the Steelers recreated the Steagles era in their "Turn Back the Clock" ceremonies, including broadcasting in black and white on the Jumbotron and airing World War II footage during the national anthem. All live entertainment reflected the 1940s. During the festivities the Steelers gave each of the six members a replica Steagles jersey to wear. The jerseys worn by honorees were later given back to the Steelers and sold to help benefit a local charity. The Steelers also painted the south end zone in plain diagonal white lines, a common practice in the NFL until the 1960s. The Steelers later kept the "plain" design in the south end zone for future years, mainly during the portion of the season the stadium is shared with college's Pitt Panthers.

== Draft ==
=== Player selections ===
The table shows the Eagles and Steelers selections and what picks each had.

Philadelphia Eagles					Pittsburgh Steelers				
Round	Pick	Player	Position	School	Round	Pick	Player	Position	School
1	2	Joe Muha	Fullback	VMI	1	7	Bill Daley	Fullback	Minnesota
2	12	Lamar "Racehorse" Davis	Back	Georgia	2	no pick			
3	17	Roy "Monk" Gafford	Back	Auburn	3	22	Jack Russell	End	Baylor
4	27	Bob Kennedy	Back	Washington State	4	no pick			
5	32	Al "Ox" Wistert	Tackle	Michigan	5	37	Harry Connolly	Back	Boston College
6	42	Bruno Banducci	Guard	Stanford	6	47	Lou Sossamon	Center	South Carolina
7	52	Walt Harrison	Center	Washington	7	57	Al Ratto	Center	St. Mary's (CA)
8	62	Bruce Alford	End	Texas Christian	8	67	Ray Curry	End	St. Mary's (CA)
9	72	Rocco Canale	Guard	Boston College	9	77	Ed Murphy	End	Holy Cross
10	82	Bill Conoly	Tackle	Texas	10	87	Dick Dwelle	Back	Rice
11	92	John Billman	Guard	Minnesota	11	97	Al Wukits	Center	Duquesne
12	102	Jack Donaldson	Tackle	Pennsylvania	12	107	Joe Repko	Tackle	Boston College
13	112	Bill Erickson	Center	Georgetown (DC)	13	117	Pete Boltrek	Tackle	North Carolina State
14	122	George Weeks	End	Alabama	14	127	Mort Shiekman	Guard	Pennsylvania
15	132	Russ Craft	Back	Alabama	15	137	Milt Crain	Back	Baylor
16	142	Paul Darling	Back	Iowa State	16	147	Max Kielbasa	Back	Duquesne
17	152	Walt Gorinski	Back	Louisiana State	17	157	Nick Skorich	Guard	Cincinnati
18	162	Bob Friedman	Tackle	Washington	18	167	Jackie Field	Back	Texas
19	172	Johnny Bezemes	Back	Holy Cross	19	177	Felix Bucek	Guard	Texas A&M
20	182	Chet Mutryn	Back	Xavier	20	187	Johnny Welsh	Back	Pennsylvania
21	192	Baptiste Manzini	Center	St. Vincent's	21	197	Tony Compagno	Back	St. Mary's (CA)
22	202	Bernie Gillespie	End	Scranton	22	207	Willie Zapalac	Back	Texas A&M
23	212	Jay "Mule" Lawhon	Tackle	Arkansas	23	217	George Bain	Tackle	Oregon State
24	222	Vince Zachem	Center	Morehead State	24	227	Harry Wynne	Tackle	Arkansas
25	232	Joe Schwarting	End	Texas	25	237	Joe Cibulas	Tackle	Duquesne
26	242	Bob Neff	Tackle	Notre Dame	26	247	Bill Yambrick	Center	Western Michigan
27	252	Art Macioszczyk	Back	Western Michigan	27	257	Jack Freeman	Guard	Texas
28	262	Jim Arata	Tackle	Xavier	28	267	Joe Goode	Back	Duquesne
29	272	Wally Scott	End	Texas	29	277	Jack Durishan	Tackle	Pittsburgh
30	282	Stan Jaworowski	Tackle	Georgetown (DC)	30	287	Fritz Lobpries	Guard	Texas
31	no pick				31	292	Art Jones	Back	Haverford
32	no pick				32	297	Bob Ruman	Back	Arizona

== Exhibitions ==
Week	Date	Opponent	Result	Record	Venue	Attendance	Reference
1	September 11	Green Bay Packers	L 10–28	0–1	Forbes Field	18,000	
2	September 16	Chicago Bears	L 7–20	0–2	Shibe Park	30,000	

== Regular season ==
=== Schedule ===
Week	Date	Opponent	Result	Record	Venue	Attendance	Recap	Sources
1	October 2	**Brooklyn Dodgers**	**W** 17–0	1–0	Shibe Park	11,131	Recap	
2	October 9	**New York Giants**	**W** 28–14	2–0	Shibe Park	15,340	Recap	
3	October 17	at Chicago Bears	**L** 21–48	2–1	Wrigley Field	21,744	Recap	
4	October 24	at **New York Giants**	**L** 14–42	2–2	Polo Grounds	42,681	Recap	
5	October 31	Chicago Cardinals	**W** 34–13	3–2	Forbes Field	16,351	Recap	
6	November 7	**Washington Redskins**	**T** 14–14	3–2–1	Shibe Park	32,694	Recap	
7	November 14	at **Brooklyn Dodgers**	**L** 7–13	3–3–1	Ebbets Field	7,613	Recap	
8	November 21	Detroit Lions	**W** 35–34	4–3–1	Forbes Field	23,338	Recap	
9	November 28	at **Washington Redskins**	**W** 27–14	5–3–1	Griffith Stadium	35,540	Recap	
10	December 5	Green Bay Packers	**L** 28–38	5–4–1	Shibe Park	34,294	Recap	
Note: Intra-division opponents are in **bold** text.

== Standings ==
NFL Eastern Division
	W	L	T	PCT	DIV	PF	PA	STK
Washington Redskins	6	3	1	.667	2–3–1	229	137	L3
New York Giants	6	3	1	.667	5–1	197	170	W4
Phil-Pitt	5	4	1	.556	3–2–1	225	230	L1
Brooklyn Dodgers	2	8	0	.200	1–5	65	234	L2

Note: Tie games were not officially counted in the standings until 1972.

=== Game summaries ===
==== Week 1: vs. Brooklyn Dodgers ====
Week One: Dodgers (0–0) at Steagles (0–0) – Game information
- Saturday, October 2, 1943
- Game weather:
- Referee: Samuel A. Weiss (Duquesne)
- Game attendance: 11,131 at Shibe Park in Philadelphia, Pennsylvania
- Game coverage: Pro Football Reference, Pittsburgh Press recap

Starting lineups
Steagles	Position	Dodgers
Bill Hewitt	Left end	Ray Wehba
Vic Sears	Left tackle	Frank "Bruiser" Kinard
Elbie Schultz	Left guard	Lew Jones
Al Wukits	Center	Bill Conkright
Ed Michaels	Right guard	Jake Fawcett
Al Wistert	Right tackle	Herm Schmarr
Larry Cabrelli	Right end	Keith Ranspot
Roy Zimmerman	Quarterback	Joe Setcavage
John Butler	Left halfback	George Cafego
Jack Hinkle	Right halfback	Merl Condit
Ben Kish	Fullback	Clarence "Pug" Manders

Steagles substitutions: Bova, Miller, Doyle, Kilroy, Paschka, Conti, Frank, Graves, Masters, Gauer, Steele, Thurbon, McCullough and Sherman.
Dodgers substitutions: Kowalski, Webb, Sergienko, Davis, Mooney, Grandinette, Owens, Gutknecht, Svendsen, Martin, McAdams, Bill Brown and Marek.

	1	2	3	4	Total
Dodgers	0	0	0	0	0
Steagles	10	7	0	0	17

The Steagles held the Dodgers to minus 33 rushing yards; this was the second lowest rushing total posted by a single team in an NFL game to that point. It currently ranks as the third-lowest rushing output in league history.

Scoring drives and statistics:

1st quarter

- Steagles – Zimmerman 32 yard field goal
- Steagles – Butler 10 yard run (Zimmerman kick)

2nd quarter

- Steagles – Steele 10 yard run (Zimmerman kick)

3rd quarter

- No scoring

4th quarter

- No scoring

Steagles	Game statistics	Dodgers
10	First downs	8
50–202	Rushes–yards	23–(−33)
98	Passing yards	126
4–16–0	Passes	14–34–3
21	Punt return yards	26
0	Kickoff return yards	93
3–43.3	Punts	5–42.8
4–3	Fumbles–lost	3–2
3–37	Penalties–yards	0–0

==== Week 2: vs. New York Giants ====
Week Two: New York Giants (0–0) at Steagles (1–0) – Game information
- Saturday, October 9, 1943
- Game weather:
- Referee: Carl Rebele (Penn State)
- Game attendance: 15,340 at Shibe Park in Philadelphia, Pennsylvania
- Game coverage: Pro Football Reference, Pittsburgh Press recap

Starting lineups
Steagles	Position	Giants
Bill Hewitt	Left end	Neal Adams
Vic Sears	Left tackle	Frank Cope
Elbie Schultz	Left guard	Len Younce
Ray Graves	Center	Bill Piccolo
Ed Michaels	Right guard	Chuck Avedisian
Ted Doyle	Right tackle	Al Blozis
Larry Cabrelli	Right end	Bill Walls
Roy Zimmerman	Quarterback	Leland Shaffer
Jack Hinkle	Left halfback	Emery Nix
John Butler	Right halfback	Ward Cuff
Ben Kish	Fullback	Bill Paschal

Steagles substitutions: Wukits, Conti, Paschka, Frank, Miller, Bova, Sherman, Steele, Thurbon, Gauer and Masters.
Giants substitutions: Dubzinski, Hein, Marone, Leemans, Roberts, Carroll, Pritko, Brown, Karcis, Kinscherf and Liebel.

	1	2	3	4	Total
Giants	14	0	0	0	14
Steagles	0	7	0	21	28

Despite setting a league record by fumbling the ball ten times, the Steagles overcame the Giants on the strength of three fourth-quarter touchdowns. The mark of ten fumbles in a game by one team has since been matched three times, but it has never been topped.

Scoring drives and statistics:

1st quarter

- Giants – Younce 30 yard interception return (Cuff kick)
- Giants – Paschal 1 yard run (Cuff kick)

2nd quarter

- Steagles – Steele 1 yard run (Zimmerman kick)

3rd quarter

- No scoring

4th quarter

- Steagles – Thurbon 11 yard pass from Zimmerman (Zimmerman kick)
- Steagles – Miller 31 yard pass from Zimmerman (Zimmerman kick)
- Steagles – Sherman 4 yard run (Paschka kick)

Steagles	Game statistics	Giants
14	First downs	6
43–191	Rushes–yards	33–42
112	Passing yards	50
5–13–3	Passes	6–14–3
83	Return yards	76
22	Punt avg.	42.8
10–5	Fumbles–lost	2–0
6–50	Penalties–yards	5–35

==== Week 3: at Chicago Bears ====
Week Three: Steagles (2–0) at Bears (2–0–1) – Game information
- Saturday, October 17, 1943
- Game weather:
- Referee: Tom Dowd (Georgetown)
- Game attendance: 21,744 at Wrigley Field in Chicago, Illinois
- Game coverage: Pro Football Reference, Pittsburgh Press recap

Starting lineups
Steagles	Position	Bears
Bill Hewitt	Left end	Jim Benton
Vic Sears	Left tackle	Bill Steinkemper
Elbie Schultz	Left guard	Dan Fortmann
Ray Graves	Center	Bulldog Turner
Ed Michaels	Right guard	George Musso
Al Wistert	Right tackle	Al Hoptowit
Larry Cabrelli	Right end	George Wilson
Roy Zimmerman	Quarterback	Bob Snyder
Ernie Steele	Left halfback	Harry Clarke
John Butler	Right halfback	Dante Magnani
Ben Kish	Fullback	Bill Osmanski

Steagles substitutions: Bova, Miller, Reutt, Doyle, Kilroy, Conti, Paschka, Wukits, Sherman, Masters, Gauer, Hinkle and Laux.
Bears substitutions: Berry, Pool, Sigillo, Babartsky, Digris, Logan, Ippolito, Matuza, Mundee, Famighetti, Nolting, McEnulty, Vodicka, Luckman and McLean.

	1	2	3	4	Total
Steagles	7	0	0	14	21
Bears	7	28	7	6	48

Scoring drives and statistics:

1st quarter

- Steagles – Steele 60 yard pass from Zimmerman(Zimmerman kick)
- Bears – Magnani 96 yard kick return (Snyder kick)

2nd quarter

- Bears – Wilson 16 yard pass from Luckman (Snyder kick)
- Bears – Magnani 13 yard run (Snyder kick)
- Bears – Nolting 3 yard run (Snyder kick)
- Bears – McEnulty 10 yard pass from Luckman (Snyder kick)

3rd quarter

- Bears – Clarke 81 yard fumble return (Snyder kick)

4th quarter

- Bears – Pool 17 yard pass from Luckman (kick failed)
- Steagles – Bova 51 yard pass from Zimmerman (Zimmerman kick)
- Steagles – Butler 1 yard run (Zimmerman kick)

Steagles	Game statistics	Bears
12	First downs	15
30–60	Rushes–yards	46–205
109	Passing yards	176
6–24–2	Passes	13–25–2
130	Return yards	183
3–36.7	Punt avg.	5–37
2–1	Fumbles–lost	2–1
7–76.5	Penalties–yards	15–108.5

==== Week 4: at New York Giants ====
Week Four: Steagles (2–1) at New York Giants (1–1) – Game information
- Sunday, October 24, 1943
- Game weather:
- Referee: Carl Rebele (Penn State)
- Game attendance: 42,681 at the Polo Grounds in New York City
- Game coverage: Pro Football Reference, Pittsburgh Press recap, Pittsburgh Post-Gazette recap

Starting lineups
Steagles	Position	Giants
Bill Hewitt	Left end	Neal Adams
Vic Sears	Left tackle	Frank Cope
Elbie Schultz	Left guard	Len Younce
Ray Graves	Center	Bill Piccolo
Enio Conti	Right guard	Chuck Avedisian
Bucko Kilroy	Right tackle	Al Blozis
Larry Cabrelli	Right end	Bill Walls
Roy Zimmerman	Quarterback	Leland Shaffer
John Butler	Left halfback	Emery Nix
Jack Hinkle	Right halfback	Ward Cuff
Charlie Gauer	Fullback	Bill Paschal

Steagles substitutions: Bova, Miller, Doyle, Wistert, Michaels, Paschka, Canale, Wukits, Kish, Thurbon, Sherman, Steele, Sader and Laux.
Giants substitutions: Pritko, Liebel, V. Adams, Carroll, Visnick, Marone, Roberts, Dubzinski, Hein, Leemans, Brown, Trocolor, Kinscherf, Sulaitis, Barker and Karcis.

	1	2	3	4	Total
Steagles	0	0	0	14	14
Giants	14	14	14	0	42

Scoring drives and statistics:

1st quarter

- Giants – Adams 34 yard blocked punt return (Cuff kick)
- Giants – Walls 31 yard pass from Nix (Cuff kick)

2nd quarter

- Giants – Paschal 4 yard run (Cuff kick)
- Giants – Liebel 6 yard pass from Leemans (Cuff kick)

3rd quarter

- Giants – Blozis 35 yard blocked punt return (Cuff kick)
- Giants – Paschal 1 yard run (Cuff kick)

4th quarter

- Steagles – Kish 4 yard pass from Sherman (Lauxkick)
- Steagles – Wukits 2 yard fumble return (Laux kick)

Steagles	Game statistics	Giants
10	First downs	12
38–64	Rushes–yards	30–72
168	Passing yards	127
13–32–1	Passes	10–17–0
47	Punt return yards	60
13–35	Punts	6–49
4–1	Fumbles–lost	1–0
5–19	Penalties–yards	2–10

==== Week 5: vs. Chicago Cardinals ====
Week Five: Chicago Cardinals (0–5) at Steagles (2–2) – Game information
- Sunday, October 31, 1943
- Game weather:
- Referee: Carl Rebele (Penn State)
- Game attendance: 16,351 at Forbes Field in Pittsburgh, Pennsylvania
- Game coverage: Pro Football Reference, Pittsburgh Press recap, Pittsburgh Post-Gazette recap

Starting lineups
Steagles	Position	Cardinals
Tony Bova	Left end	Eddie Rucinski
Vic Sears	Left tackle	Cliff Duggan
Elbie Schultz	Left guard	Conway Baker
Ray Graves	Center	Vaughn Stewart
Ed Michaels	Right guard	Gordon Wilson
Ted Doyle	Right tackle	Chet Bulger
Tom Miller	Right end	Don Currivan
Roy Zimmerman	Quarterback	Walt Rankin
John Butler	Left halfback	Walt Masters
Jack Hinkle	Right halfback	Johnny Hall
Ben Kish	Fullback	John Grigas

Steagles substitutions: Hewitt, Cabrelli, Bucko Kilroy, Wistert, Conti, Canale, Paschka, Wukits, Gauer, Steele, Steward, Thurbon, Sherman, Laux and Sader.
Cardinals substitutions: Wager, Rexer, Robnett, Albrecht, Clarence Booth, Ghersanich, Cahill, Stokes, Puplis, Morrow, Smith, Martin.

	1	2	3	4	Total
Cardinals	0	13	0	0	13
Steagles	21	0	0	13	34

Scoring drives and statistics:

1st quarter

- Steagles – Kish 86 yard interception return (Zimmerman kick)
- Steagles – Bova 31 yard pass from Zimmerman (Zimmerman kick)
- Steagles – Hinkle fumble recovery in end zone (Zimmerman kick)

2nd quarter

- Cardinals – Currivan 35 yard pass from Masters (kick failed)
- Cardinals – Hall 67 yard pass from Cahill (Stokes kick)

3rd quarter

- No scoring

4th quarter

- Steagles – Thurbon 3 yard run (kick failed)
- Steagles – Bova 26 yard pass from Zimmerman (Zimmerman kick)

Steagles	Game statistics	Cardinals
16	First downs	9
54–167	Rushes–yards	28–31
74	Passing yards	173
4–10–1	Passes	8–21–3
45	Punt return yards	17
5–33	Punts	7–36.3
75	Kickoff return yards	28
4–2	Fumbles–lost	2–2
6–82	Penalties–yards	6–59

==== Week 6: vs. Washington Redskins ====
Week Six: Washington Redskins (4–0) at Steagles (3–2) – Game information
- Sunday, November 7, 1943
- Game weather:
- Referee: Samuel A. Weiss (Duquesne)
- Game attendance: 32,694 at Shibe Park in Philadelphia, Pennsylvania
- Game coverage: Pro Football Reference, Pittsburgh Press recap, Pittsburgh Post-Gazette recap

Starting lineups
Steagles	Position	Redskins
Tony Bova	Left end	Bob Masterson
Vic Sears	Left tackle	Willie Wilkin
Elbie Schultz	Left guard	Dick Farman
Ray Graves	Center	George Smith
Ed Michaels	Right guard	Steve Slivinski
Ted Doyle	Right tackle	Lou Rymkus
Larry Cabrelli	Right end	Joe Aguirre
Roy Zimmerman	Quarterback	Ray Hare
John Butler	Left halfback	Sammy Baugh
Jack Hinkle	Right halfback	Wilbur Moore
Ben Kish	Fullback	Bob Seymour

Steagles substitutions: Hewitt, Miller, Kilroy, Wistert, Canale, Conti, Paschka, Wukits, Gauer, Steward, Thurbon, Steele and Sherman.
Redskins substitutions: Lapka, Zeno, Pasqua, Shugart, Fiorentino, Leon, Hayden, Seno, Dunn and Farkas.

	1	2	3	4	Total
Redskins	0	0	7	7	14
Steagles	0	0	7	7	14

The 1942 NFL Champion Washington Redskins come to Philadelphia with a 13 regular season game winning streak, and for 1943 scoring an avg of 30 points per game and allowing on 6 a game.

Scoring drives and statistics:

1st quarter

- No scoring

2nd quarter

- No scoring

3rd quarter

- Steagles – Cabrelli 24 yard interception return (Zimmerman kick)
- Redskins – Moore 25 yard pass from Baugh (Masterson kick)

4th quarter

- Steagles – Rymkus 4 yard blocked punt return (Masterson kick)
- Redskins – Steele 35 yard pass from Zimmerman (Zimmerman kick)

Steagles	Game statistics	Redskins
10	First downs	11
44–80	Rushes–yards	23–62
89	Passing yards	147
5–17–3	Passes	15–30–3
32	Punt return yards	47
11–31.5	Punts	5–48.6
56	Kickoff return yards	52
2–0	Fumbles–lost	6–3
7–79	Penalties–yards	6–60

==== Week 7: at Brooklyn Dodgers ====
Week Seven: Steagles (3–2–1) at Brooklyn Dodgers (1–6) – Game information
- Sunday, November 14, 1943
- Game weather:
- Referee: Samuel A. Weiss (Duquesne)
- Game attendance: 7,613 at Ebbets Field in Brooklyn, New York
- Game coverage: Pro Football Reference, Pittsburgh Press recap, Pittsburgh Post-Gazette recap

Starting lineups
Steagles	Position	Dodgers
Tony Bova	Left end	Ray Wehba
Vic Sears	Left tackle	Frank "Bruiser" Kinard
Gordon Paschka	Left guard	Jake Fawcett
Ray Graves	Center	Bud Svendsen
Ed Michaels	Right guard	Lew Jones
Ted Doyle	Right tackle	George Sergienko
Larry Cabrelli	Right end	Andy Kowalski
John Butler	Quarterback	Tillie Manton
Bob Thurbon	Left halfback	Ken Heineman
Jack Hinkle	Right halfback	Merl Condit
Ben Kish	Fullback	Clarence "Pug" Manders

Steagles substitutions: Gauer, Miller, Kilroy, Wistert, Conti, Schultz, Wukits, Zimmerman, Steele and Steward.
Dodgers substitutions: Ranspot, Webb, Davis, Matisi, Grandinette, Martin, Setcavage, McAdams and Sachse.

	1	2	3	4	Total
Steagles	7	0	0	0	7
Dodgers	0	7	6	0	13

Scoring drives and statistics:

1st quarter

- Steagles – Thurbon 3 yard run (Paschka kick)

2nd quarter

- Dodgers – Manders 2 yard run (Kinard kick)

3rd quarter

- Dodgers – Condit 65 yard pass from Heineman (kick failed)

4th quarter

- No scoring

Steagles	Game statistics	Redskins
10	First downs	11
44–80	Rushes–yards	23–62
89	Passing yards	147
5–17–3	Passes	15–30–3
32	Punt return yards	47
11–31.5	Punts	5–48.6
56	Kickoff return yards	52
2–0	Fumbles–lost	6–3
7–79	Penalties–yards	6–60

==== Week 8: vs. Detroit Lions ====
Week Seven: Detroit Lions (3–5–1) at Steagles (3–3–1) – Game information
- Sunday, November 21, 1943
- Game weather:
- Referee: Ronald Gibb
- Game attendance: 23,338 at Forbes Field in Pittsburgh, Pennsylvania
- Game coverage: Pro Football Reference, Pittsburgh Press recap, Pittsburgh Post-Gazette recap

Starting lineups
Steagles	Position	Lions
Tony Bova	Left end	Bill Fisk
Vic Sears	Left tackle	Ted Pavelec
Elbie Schultz	Left guard	Riley Matheson
Ray Graves	Center	Gerry Conlee
Ed Michaels	Right guard	Anthony Rubino
Bucko Kilroy	Right tackle	Al Kaporch
Larry Cabrelli	Right end	Jack Matheson
Roy Zimmerman	Quarterback	Bill Callihan
John Butler	Left halfback	Frank Sinkwich
Jack Hinkle	Right halfback	Arthur Van Tone
Ben Kish	Fullback	Harry Hopp

Steagles substitutions: Gauer, Miller, Wistert, Doyle, Gordon Paschka, Conti, Wukits, Steward, Steele, Thurbon and Laux.
Lions substitutions: Kuczynski, Wickett, Batinski, Rockenbach, Lio, Evans, Hackney, Mathews, Keene and Fenenbock.

	1	2	3	4	Total
Lions	0	13	7	14	34
Steagles	7	7	7	14	35

Scoring drives and statistics:

1st quarter

- Steagles – Butler 4 yard run (Zimmerman kick)

2nd quarter

- Steagles – Hinkle 1 yard run (Zimmerman kick)
- Lions – Mathews 98 yard kick return (Lio kick)
- Lions – Hopp 88 yard run (kick failed)

3rd quarter

- Steagles – Thurbon 2 yard run (Zimmerman kick)
- Lions – Hackney 7 yard run (Lio kick)

4th quarter

- Lions – Hopp 88 yard lateral from Mathews (Lio kick)
- Steagles – Cabrelli 7 yard pass from Zimmerman (Zimmerman kick)
- Steagles – Zimmerman 2 yard run (Zimmerman kick)
- Lions – Van Tone 71 yard pass from Fenenbock (Lio kick)

Steagles	Game statistics	Lions
17	First downs	12
48–262	Rushes–yards	33–160
83	Passing yards	194
10	Yards off laterals	25
7–13–1	Passes	10–22–4
0	Punt return yards	9
4–40.75	Punts	2–32.5
101	Kickoff return yards	167
2–1	Fumbles–lost	3–1
3–35	Penalties–yards	4–40

==== Week 9: at Washington Redskins ====
Week Nine: Steagles (4–3–1) at Washington Redskins (6–0–1) – Game information
- Sunday, November 28, 1943
- Game weather:
- Referee: Carl Rebele (Penn State)
- Game attendance: 35,540 at Griffith Stadium in Washington, DC
- Game coverage: Pro Football Reference, Pittsburgh Press recap, Pittsburgh Post-Gazette recap

Starting lineups
Steagles	Position	Redskins
Tony Bova	Left end	Bob Masterson
Vic Sears	Left tackle	Lou Rymkus
Elbie Schultz	Left guard	Clyde Shugart
Ray Graves	Center	George Smith
Ed Michaels	Right guard	Steve Slivinski
Bucko Kilroy	Right tackle	Joe Pasqua
Larry Cabrelli	Right end	Joe Aguirre
Roy Zimmerman	Quarterback	Ray Hare
John Butler	Left halfback	Sammy Baugh
Jack Hinkle	Right halfback	Wilbur Moore
Ben Kish	Fullback	Bob Seymour

Steagles substitutions: Miller, Wistert, Doyle, Paschka, Conti, Canale, Wukits, Sherman, Thurbon, Steward and Steele.
Redskins substitutions: Piasecky, Wilkin, Fiorentino, Zeno, Ribar, Leon, Conkright, Seno, Cafego and Farkas.

	1	2	3	4	Total
Steagles	7	0	7	13	27
Washington	0	0	7	7	14

Scoring drives and statistics:

1st quarter

- Steagles – Thurbon 6 yard run (Zimmerman kick)

2nd quarter

- No scoring

3rd quarter

- Steagles – Thurbon 5 yard run (Zimmerman kick)
- Redskins – Masterson 4 yard pass from Baugh (Masterson kick)

4th quarter

- Steagles – Steele 47 yard run (Zimmerman kick failed)
- Steagles – Hinkle 1 yard run (Zimmerman kick)
- Redskins – Aguirre 12 yard pass from Baugh (Aguirre kick)

Steagles	Game statistics	Redskins
19	First downs	10
64–297	Rushes–yards	20–58
82	Passing yards	211
6–13–1	Passes	14–28–2
13	Punt return yards	61
6–29.7	Punts	7–39.5
59	Kickoff return yards	81
4–2	Fumbles–lost	1–0
5–30	Penalties–yards	10–60

==== Week 10: vs. Green Bay Packers ====
Week Ten: Green Bay Packers (6–2–1) at Steagles (5–3–1) – Game information
- Sunday, December 5, 1943
- Game weather:
- Referee: Tow Dowd (Holy Cross)
- Game attendance: 34,294 at Shibe Park in Philadelphia, Pennsylvania
- Game coverage: Pro Football Reference, Pittsburgh Press recap, Pittsburgh Post-Gazette recap

Starting lineups
Steagles	Position	Packers
Tony Bova	Left end	Don Hutson
Vic Sears	Left tackle	Baby Ray
Elbie Schultz	Left guard	Bill Kuusisto
Ray Graves	Center	Charley Brock
Ed Michaels	Right guard	Pete Tinsley
Bucko Kilroy	Right tackle	Chet Adams
Larry Cabrelli	Right end	Harry Jacunski
Roy Zimmerman	Quarterback	Larry Craig
John Butler	Left halfback	Tony Canadeo
Jack Hinkle	Right halfback	Lou Brock
Ben Kish	Fullback	Ted Fritsch

Steagles substitutions: Miller, Gauer, Doyle, Wistert, Paschka, Conti, Wukits, Sherman, Thurbon, Steward and Steele.
Packers substitutions: Mason, Evans, Berezney, Goldenberg, Flowers, Falkenstein, Laws, Starret, Uram, Lankas, Kahler and Comp.

	1	2	3	4	Total
Packers	14	3	7	14	38
Steagles	14	0	0	14	28

Scoring drives and statistics:

1st quarter

- Packers – Canadeo 35 yard run (Hutson kick)
- Steagles – Hinkle 38 yard run (Zimmerman kick)
- Packers – Canadeo 13 yard pass from Brock (Hutson kick)
- Steagles – Bova 48 yard pass from Zimmerman (Zimmerman kick)

2nd quarter

- Packers – Hutson 25 yard field goal

3rd quarter

- Packers – Comp 4 yard run (Hutson kick)

4th quarter

- Packers – Hutson 12 yard pass from Comp (Hutson kick)
- Steagles – Bova 13 yard pass from Sherman (Zimmerman kick)
- Steagles – Steele 4 yard run (Zimmerman kick)
- Packers – Hutson 23 yard pass from Comp (Hutson kick)

Steagles	Game statistics	Packers
10	First downs	8
40–142	Rushes–yards	38–175
176	Passing yards	103
7–18–6	Passes	9–23–2
57	Punt return yards	8
3–36	Punts	5–39
176	Kickoff return yards	63
4–2	Fumbles–lost	0–0
2–10	Penalties–yards	8–55

== Roster ==
##	= Eagles player
##	= Steelers player

Positions key
E	N/A	B	N/A	HB	N/A	TB	N/A
DB	N/A	T	N/A	G	N/A	FB	N/A
C	N/A	DE	N/A	MG	N/A	DT	N/A
LB	N/A	K	N/A	QB	N/A	HC	Head coach

Players and coaches of the 1943 Phil/Pitt "Steagles":
#	Player	Pos.	GP	GS	Ht.	Wt.	Age	Yrs.	College	Draft status
—	Greasy Neale	co-HC (offense)					53	3rd	West Virginia Wesleyan	
—	Walt Kiesling	co-HC (defense)					40	5th	St. Thomas (MN)	
85	Tony Bova	E/B	10	6	6–1	190	26	1	St. Francis (PA)	4-F (eyesight)
27	John Butler	HB/TB	10	10	5–10	185	25	R	Tennessee	4-F (eyesight, knees)
84	Larry Cabrelli	E/DB	10	9	5–11	194	26	2	Colgate	4-F (knee)
75	Rocco Canale	T/G	4	0	5–11	240	26	R	Boston College	1-A (active duty Army)
67	Enio "Ed" Conti	G	10	1	5–11	204	30	2	Arkansas / Bucknell	3-A (father)
72	Ted Doyle	T/G	10	4	6–2	224	29	5	Nebraska	3-A (father)
61	Joe Frank	T	2	0	6–1	217	28	2	Georgetown (DC)	
32	Charlie Gauer	FB/E	9	1	6–2	213	22	R	Colgate	4-F (ulcers, knee)
52	Ray Graves	C	10	9	6–1	205	25	1	Tennessee / Tenn. Wesleyan	4-F (hearing)
82	Bill Hewitt	E/DE	6	4	6–4	190	34	1	Michigan	4-F (perforated eardrum)
43	Jack Hinkle	B	10	9	5–9	190	26	11	Syracuse	4-F (ulcers)
76	Frank "Bucko" Kilroy	G/MG/T/DT	9	4	6–2	243	22	R	Notre Dame / Temple	1-A (active duty Merchant Marine)
44	Ben Kish	B	10	9	6–0	207	26	3	Pittsburgh	4-F (head injury)
15	Ted Laux	HB/DB	4	0	5–10	185	25	R	St. Joseph's (PA)	
31	Bob Masters	HB/E	3	0	5–11	200	32	6	Baylor	
25	Hugh McCullough	TB/HB	1	0	6–0	185	27	4	Oklahoma	
60	Ed Michaels	G	10	9	5–11	205	29	R	Villanova	4-F (hearing)
89	Tom Miller	DE/E	10	1	6–2	202	25	R	Hampden-Sydney	4-F (hearing)
61	Gordon Paschka	FB/G	10	1	6–0	220	23	R	Minnesota	3-A (father)
81	Ray Reutt	E	1	0	6–0	195	26	R	VMI	
33	Steve Sader	FB	2	0	5–11	180	26	R	none	
71	Eberle "Elbie" Schultz	T/G	10	9	6–4	252	26	3	Oregon State	3-A (father)
79	Vic Sears	T/DT	10	10	6–3	223	26	2	Oregon State	4-F (ulcers)
10	Allie Sherman	QB	8	0	5–11	170	25	R	Brooklyn	4-F (perforated eardrums)
37	Ernie Steele	HB/DB	10	1	6–0	187	26	1	Washington	3-A (father)
36	Dean Steward	HB	6	0	6–0	210	20	R	Ursinus	1-A (drafted in 1944)
49	Bob Thurbon	HB	9	1	5–10	176	25	R	Pittsburgh	4-F (reason unknown)
70	Al Wistert	T/G/DT	9	2	6–1	214	23	R	Michigan	4-F (osteomyelitis)
50	Al Wukits	C/LB/G	10	1	6–3	218	26	R	Duquesne	4-F (hernia)
7	Roy Zimmerman	QB/B/K	10	9	6–2	201	25	3	San Jose State	3-C (father, farmer)

== Sources ==
- Algeo, Matthew (2006), Last Team Standing: How the Steelers and the Eagles—"The Steagles"—Saved Pro Football During World War II. Philadelphia: Da Capo Press. ISBN 978-0-306-81472-3

== See also ==
- 1942 SANFL season
