= 1943 Washington Redskins season =

NFL team season

- Owner: George Preston Marshall
- General manager: Sid Carroll
- Head coach: Dutch Bergman
- Home stadium: Griffith Stadium

Results
- Record: 6–3–1
- Division place: 1st NFL Eastern
- Playoffs: Won Eastern Divisional Playoff (at Giants) 28–0; Lost NFL Championship (at Bears) 21–41

The 1943 Washington Redskins were the defending NFL champions and finished the regular season at 6–3–1. They lost their last three games, including the final two to the New York Giants, and the two teams finished with identical records. Although the Giants had won both games between the teams, the rules of the time called for a tiebreaker playoff game to determine the Eastern division champion. The extra game was held at the Polo Grounds in New York City, which the underdog Redskins won, 28–0.

In a rematch of the previous year's title game, the Redskins met the Chicago Bears in the NFL championship game. This game was played in Chicago at Wrigley Field on December 26, and was won by the host Bears, 41–21.

== Schedule ==
Game	Date	Opponent	Result	Record	Venue	Attendance	Recap	Sources
1	October 10	**Brooklyn Dodgers**	**W** 27–0	1–0	Griffith Stadium	35,450	Recap	
2	October 17	at Green Bay Packers	**W** 33–7	2–0	State Fair Park	23,058	Recap	
3	October 24	Chicago Cardinals	**W** 13–7	3–0	Griffith Stadium	35,450	Recap	
4	October 31	at **Brooklyn Dodgers**	**W** 48–10	4–0	Ebbets Field	11,471	Recap	
5	November 7	at **Steagles**	**T** 14–14	4–0–1	Shibe Park	28,893	Recap	
6	November 14	Detroit Lions	**W** 42–20	5–0–1	Griffith Stadium	35,450	Recap	
7	November 21	Chicago Bears	**W** 21–7	6–0–1	Griffith Stadium	35,671	Recap	
8	November 28	**Steagles**	**L** 14–27	6–1–1	Griffith Stadium	35,826	Recap	
9	December 5	at **New York Giants**	**L** 10–14	6–2–1	Polo Grounds	35,826	Recap	
10	December 12	**New York Giants**	**L** 7–31	6–3–1	Griffith Stadium	35,540	Recap	
Note: Intra-division opponents are in **bold** text.

== Playoffs ==
Round	Date	Opponent	Result	Venue	Attendance	Recap	Source
Divisional	December 19	at New York Giants	W 28–0	Polo Grounds	42,800	Recap	
Championship	December 26	at Chicago Bears	L 21–41	Wrigley Field	34,320	Recap	

== Roster ==
1943 Washington Redskins final roster
Backs: 39 Frank Akins RB/CB; 33 Sammy Baugh RB/CB/P; 32 George Cafego CB/RB/P; 44 Andy Farkas FB/LB; 42 Ray Hare RB/S; 35 Wilbur Moore RB/CB; 25 Frank Seno RB/CB; 20 Bob Seymour FB/LB; 41 Leo Stasica RB/CB	Linemen/Linebackers: 38 Red Conkright C/LB; 21 Dick Farman G/DG; 11 Al Fiorentino G/DG; 18 Ken Hayden C/LB; 48 Tony Leon G/DG; 37 Joe Pasqua T/DT; 40 Frank Ribar G/DG; 12 Lou Rymkus T/DT; 51 Clyde Shugart G/DG; 16 Steve Slivinski G/DG; 47 George Smith C/LB; 36 Willie Wilkin T/DT; 27 Joe Zeno T/DT	Ends/Receivers: 19 Joe Aguirre K; 46 Joe Gibson; 45 Ted Lapka; 28 Bob Masterson K; 14 Al Piasecky; 53 Jack Smith; Reserve: 38 Jack Jenkins FB/LB (Military); rookies in italics

== Standings ==
NFL Eastern Division
	W	L	T	PCT	DIV	PF	PA	STK
Washington Redskins	6	3	1	.667	2–3–1	229	137	L3
New York Giants	6	3	1	.667	5–1	197	170	W4
Phil-Pitt	5	4	1	.556	3–2–1	225	230	L1
Brooklyn Dodgers	2	8	0	.200	1–5	65	234	L2

Note: Tie games were not officially counted in the standings until 1972.
