= 1943 Brooklyn Dodgers (NFL) season =

National Football League team season

1943 Brooklyn Dodgers season
- Owner: Dan Topping
- General manager: Dennis J. Shea
- Head coach: Pete Cawthon
- Home stadium: Ebbets Field

Results
- Record: 2–8
- Division place: 4th NFL Eastern
- Playoffs: Did not qualify

The 1943 Brooklyn Dodgers season marked their 14th year in the National Football League (NFL) and their final season before becoming the Brooklyn Tigers. The team failed to improve on their previous season's output of 3–8, winning only two games. They failed to qualify for the playoffs for the 12th consecutive season and were shut out in their first four games.

== Schedule ==
| Week | Date | Opponent | Result | Record | Venue | Attendance | Recap | Sources |
|---|---|---|---|---|---|---|---|---|
| 1 | September 26 | at Detroit Lions | **L** 0–27 | 0–1 | Briggs Stadium | 23,768 | Recap | |
| 2 | October 2 | at **Phil-Pitt** | **L** 0–17 | 0–2 | Shibe Park | 11,131 | Recap | |
| 3 | October 10 | **Washington Redskins** | **L** 0–27 | 0–3 | Ebbets Field | 35,540 | Recap | |
| 4 | October 17 | **New York Giants** | **L** 0–20 | 0–4 | Ebbets Field | 18,361 | Recap | |
| 5 | October 24 | at Chicago Bears | **L** 21–33 | 0–5 | Wrigley Field | 9,600 | Recap | |
| 6 | October 31 | **Washington Redskins** | **L** 10–48 | 0–6 | Ebbets Field | 11,471 | Recap | |
| 7 | November 7 | Chicago Cardinals | **W** 7–0 | 1–6 | Ebbets Field | 13,340 | Recap | |
| 8 | November 14 | **Phil-Pitt** | **W** 13–7 | 2–6 | Ebbets Field | 7,614 | Recap | |
| 9 | November 21 | Green Bay Packers | **L** 7–31 | 2–7 | Ebbets Field | 18,992 | Recap | |
| 10 | November 28 | at **New York Giants** | **L** 7–24 | 2–8 | Polo Grounds | 28,706 | Recap | |
Note: Intra-division opponents are in **bold** text.

== Roster ==
1942 Brooklyn Dodgers final roster
| Backs: 26 Bill Brown RB/S; 35 Merl Condit RB/CB/P; 10 Ken Heineman RB/CB/P; 27 Cecil Johnson RB/CB/P; 9 Pug Manders FB/LB; 19 Tillie Manton RB/S; 43 Jodie Marek FB/LB; 12 Frank Martin RB/CB; 60 Dean McAdams RB/CB/P; 30 Frank Sachse RB/CB; 16 Joe Setcavage RB/S | Linemen/Linebackers: 15 Bill Armstrong G/T/DG/DT; 57 Bill Davis T/DT; 17 Jake Fawcett G/DG; 34 George Grandinette G/DG; 41 Lew Jones D/DG; 25 Bruiser Kinard T/DT/K; 28 John Matisi G/DG; 42 Herm Schmarr T/DT; 39 George Sergienko T/DT; 18 Bud Svendsen C/LB; 24 Phil Swiadon T/G/DT/DG | Ends/Receivers: 22 Andy Kowalski; 14 Keith Ranspot; 29 George Webb; 38 Ray Wehba; Reserve: Jim Sivell G/DG; Rookies in italics |

== Standings ==
NFL Eastern Division
| | W | L | T | PCT | DIV | PF | PA | STK |
|---|---|---|---|---|---|---|---|---|
| Washington Redskins | 6 | 3 | 1 | .667 | 2–3–1 | 229 | 137 | L3 |
| New York Giants | 6 | 3 | 1 | .667 | 5–1 | 197 | 170 | W4 |
| Phil-Pitt | 5 | 4 | 1 | .556 | 3–2–1 | 225 | 230 | L1 |
| Brooklyn Dodgers | 2 | 8 | 0 | .200 | 1–5 | 65 | 234 | L2 |

Note: Tie games were not officially counted in the standings until 1972.
