= Roy Zimmerman (American football) =

American football player and softball pitcher (1918–1997)

- Zimmerman in 1942

No. 22, 7, 6, 29
- Positions: Quarterback, wingback

Personal information
- Born: February 20, 1918; Tonganoxie, Kansas, U.S.
- Died: August 22, 1997 (aged 79); Madera, California, U.S.
- Listed height: 6 ft 2 in (1.88 m)
- Listed weight: 201 lb (91 kg)

Career information
- High school: Monrovia (Monrovia, California)
- College: San Jose State
- NFL draft: 1940: 7th round, 58th overall pick

Career history
- Washington Redskins (1940–1942); Steagles (1943); Philadelphia Eagles (1944–1946); Detroit Lions (1947); Boston Yanks (1948)

Awards and highlights
- NFL champion (1942); All-Pro (1944); NFL All-Star (1942); NFL interceptions leader (1945); First-team Little All-American (1939)

Career NFL statistics
- Passing attempts: 299
- Passing completions: 703
- Completion percentage: 42.5%
- TD–INT: 44–70
- Passing yards: 4,801
- Passer rating: 47.3
- Rushing yards: 244
- Rushing touchdowns: 6
- Stats at Pro Football Reference

Henry LeRoy Zimmerman Jr. (February 20, 1918 – August 22, 1997) was an American professional football player who played wingback and quarterback in the National Football League (NFL) from 1940 to 1948. Afterwards, he played professional fast-pitch softball for 26 years, during which he revolutionized pitching.

== Early life ==
Zimmerman was born in Tonganoxie, Kansas to Henry Zimmerman Sr. and Ivol Gertrude Hawkins and played high school football at Monrovia Arcadia Duarte High School in Monrovia, California, where he was a quarterback. He then went on to play college football at San José State University. While playing for the San Jose State Spartans in 1939, the team went 13–0.

== NFL career ==
Zimmerman was selected in the seventh round of the 1940 NFL draft by the Washington Redskins. Zimmerman was the first San Jose State player ever to be drafted by the NFL. He played for the Redskins from 1940 to 1942. Then in 1943, Zimmerman played for the Steagles, a team that was a combination of the Philadelphia Eagles and Pittsburgh Steelers (the teams were forced to merge because both had lost many players to military service due to World War II). He continued playing for the Eagles until 1946, and then played for the Detroit Lions, before finishing his career with the Boston Yanks.

Zimmerman was named to the Pro Bowl in 1942 and named All-Pro in 1944. He also led the league in interceptions in 1945 with seven.

== Softball career ==
Zimmerman pitched softball during his last three years at San Jose State. For 26 years after his NFL career, he played professional fast-pitch softball and led his teams, the Fresno Hoak Packers and the Long Beach Nitehawks, to nine world titles. He developed the riseball and the dropball, which are now predominant pitches in any pitcher's arsenal. He pitched two perfect games and six no-hitters in World Championship play, striking out all 21 batters during one of his perfect games. He was inducted into the International Softball Congress Hall of Fame in 1970 and the award for the outstanding pitcher in the ISC World Tournament is named in his honor. He was also inducted into the Long Beach Softball Hall of Fame.

== Personal life ==
After retiring from the NFL, Zimmerman obtained his teaching credential. He first taught and coached at Parlier High School from 1951 to 1954. In 1955, he began teaching and coaching at Madera High School, where he remained until his retirement in 1981. He married Dena Mary Otis of Big Timber, Montana on May 3, 1940, and they had three sons. Zimmerman died in Madera, California on August 22, 1997.
