= Gordon Paschka =

American football player (1920–1964)

- Paschka in 1947

No. 61, 70, 33
- Positions: Fullback, guard

Personal information
- Born: March 6, 1920; Clinton, Iowa, U.S.
- Died: June 9, 1964 (aged 44); Hopkins Bay, Canada
- Listed height: 6 ft 0 in (1.83 m)
- Listed weight: 220 lb (100 kg)

Career information
- College: Minnesota (1938-1941)
- NFL draft: 1942: 4th round, 28th overall pick

Career history
- Philadelphia Eagles (1943); New York Giants (1947)

Awards and highlights
- 2× NCAA National champion (1940, 1941); AFL Championship (1946); AFL All-League First Team (1946); AFL rushing leader (1946)

Career NFL statistics
- Rushing yards: 143
- Rushing average: 3
- Touchdowns: 2
- Stats at Pro Football Reference

Gordon F. Paschka (March 6, 1920 – June 9, 1964) was an American professional football guard and blocking fullback in the National Football League (NFL) for the 1943 Phil/Pitt "Steagles", a one-year combination of the Philadelphia Eagles and Pittsburgh Steelers forced by the loss of so many players serving in World War II, as well as the New York Giants for one year after the war.

Paschka played college football at the University of Minnesota, where he was a member of two National Champion teams. He was drafted in the fourth round of the 1942 NFL draft by the Philadelphia Eagles.

== Early life ==
Gordon Paschka was born in Chaska, Minnesota on March 6, 1920. He attended Watertown High School in Watertown, Minnesota, where he played football and baseball.

== College career ==
He attended the University of Minnesota, where he quickly demonstrated his proficiency as a blocker and defensive lineman, gaining promotion to the varsity squad as a first team lineman for the 1938 season. There he helped block for future Washington Redskins halfback Wilbur Moore.

Paschka was a member of the back-to-back National Champion Minnesota Golden Gopher teams of 1940 and 1941.

== Professional career ==
Paschka was drafted in the fourth round of the 1942 NFL draft by the Philadelphia Eagles, who made him the 28th overall selection.

Press photo of Paschka, probably dating to 1946.

Paschka was a member of the 1943 Steagles, a short-lived combination of the two NFL teams based in Pennsylvania forced by the greatly constrained size of available players owing to World War II. Wearing uniform number 61, Paschke was able to play the 1943 season on account of the 3-A draft status assigned to him as a father. Paschka played only the 1943 season for "Phil-Pitt", seeing action in 10 games as a guard, primarily in a reserve role.

In 1946, with World War II over, Paschka attempted to restart his professional football career. He signed with the New York Giants of the NFL, who assigned him to their minor league affiliate Jersey City Football Giants of the American Football League (AFL), who would convert him from guard to the fullback position. The change was inspired. Paschka led the entire American Association in rushing in 1946, racking up 515 yards from scrimmage in 76 carries — an average of 6.8 yards per tote — topping his nearest competitor, John Piccone of the Bethlehem Bulldogs, by 126 yards.

Paschka helped lead Jersey City to a 9–1 record, best in the AFL's Eastern Division, culminating in a 14–13 win over the Akron Bears in the 1946 AFL championship game.

Paschka would be selected to the first team American League All-Star team at the end of the 1946 season. He would miss being a unanimous choice by a single ballot that listed him on the second team.

Ahead of training camp for the 1947 season, the National League Giants recalled him to the big league squad. This time he would make the opening day roster, seeing action in 6 games for the club at the fullback position. During these six games with New York, Paschka would run for 143 yards, catch one pass for a 6-yard loss, and cross the goal line twice.

However, roster pressures proved too much and the Giants released Paschka along with his fellow Jersey City running mate, Bobby Morris, on November 29, 1947, effectively ending his pro football career.

== Life after football ==
After his year back with the Giants, Paschka left pro football to become a high school football coach in International Falls, Anoka, and Winona, Minnesota. He later relocated to Clinton, Iowa.

== Death and legacy ==
Paschka went missing after a fishing trip with a friend on Rainy Lake, in the Rainy River District, of Ontario, Canada, on June 9, 1964. After leaving a dock by boat and failing to return on time, a search ensued. The craft and the camping gear and personal effects of the men was soon discovered scattered along one mile of shoreline on the Canadian side of the lake, about eight miles from their point of departure.

The body of Paschka's fishing companion, John Shuger, of Wilton Junction, Iowa, was recovered 18 days after the mishap. Paschka's remains were finally discovered, lodged in brush and rocks, by a fisherman on July 12.

In the aftermath of Paschka's death, Winona High School announced the establishment of the Gordon Paschka Memorial Trophy, to be engraved with the names of the captain and co-captain of the school's football team for the next ten years.
