= Jack Hinkle =

American football player and coach (1917–2006)

No. 6, 43
- Position: Back

Personal information
- Born: October 31, 1917; Milton, Pennsylvania, U.S.
- Died: November 16, 2006 (aged 89); Norristown, Pennsylvania, U.S.
- Listed height: 6 ft 0 in (1.83 m)
- Listed weight: 195 lb (88 kg)

Career information
- High school: Milton
- College: Syracuse (1936-1939)
- NFL draft: 1940: undrafted

Career history

Playing
- New York Giants (1940); New York Americans (1941); Philadelphia Eagles (1941); Steagles (1943); Philadelphia Eagles (1944–1947)

Coaching
- Simon Gratz (HS) (1944) Head coach; Drexel (1950-1957) Assistant coach; Drexel (1958-1960) Head coach

Career NFL statistics
- Rushing yards: 1,067
- Rushing average: 4.5
- Receptions: 7
- Receiving yards: 68
- Interceptions: 9
- Fumble recoveries: 1
- Total touchdowns: 7
- Stats at Pro Football Reference

Head coaching record
- Career: 2–20–1 (.109)

John M. Hinkle (October 31, 1917 – November 17, 2006) was an American football player and coach. He played professionally in the National Football League (NFL) with the New York Giants, Philadelphia Eagles and the "Steagles". Hinkle later became a football coach, and was head coach at Drexel.

== Syracuse ==
Prior to his professional career, Hinkle was standout for Syracuse University's football team in the late 1930s. During his time at Syracuse, he rarely carried the ball. However, he was still a three-time lettermen at Syracuse in 1937, 1938 and 1939.

== Professional career ==
Prior to joining the New York Giants, Hinkle played for the Giants' American Association team, the Jersey City Giants. Upon joining the New York Giants, Hinkle was cut from the team after just three games due to an argument with Giants coach Steve Owen. When asked what the argument was about, Hinkle said "something asinine". He later signed with the New York Americans of the third American Football League in 1941. The Americans' 1941 season ended just in time for Hinkle to sign with the Philadelphia Eagles for their last game of the season, against the Washington Redskins. That final game (in which Hinkle's only play was a five-yard kickoff return) was held on December 7, 1941, the day Pearl Harbor was attacked by Japan, thrusting the United States into World War II.

"When [Hinkle] gets in a game, he's a slambang player"

— Greasy Neale

After a brief stint in the army in 1942, Hinkle was re-signed by the Eagles by coach Greasy Neale. Hinkle enjoyed his best season though in 1943, when a league-wide manning shortage, brought on by World War II, caused the Eagles to temporarily merge with the cross-state Pittsburgh Steelers. The merged team was called the "Steagles" by the media. With the Steagles, Hinkle rushed for a team-leading 571 yards and three touchdowns, while also intercepting four passes as a defensive back. He lost the 1943 NFL rushing title to the Giants' Bill Paschal by one yard. However, it was in a game against the Giants that Hinkle was not given credit for a 37-yard run -- due to a mix-up by official statistician Ross Kaufman, that run was credited to teammate John Butler. Hinkle did not complain about not winning the NFL rushing crown, however.

He finished his NFL career in 1947 with 1,067 yards, five touchdowns and nine interceptions.

== Military service ==
Outside of football, Hinkle's name is located on the World War II honor roll located at the Pro Football Hall of Fame in Canton, Ohio. The NFL honor roll is a listing of the over 1,000 NFL personnel who served in the military during the war. He spent the 1942 season in the U.S. Army. However, he was later discharged from the service after a year due to stomach ulcers.

== Coaching career ==
In 1944, Hinkle was head coach at Simon Gratz High School while continuing playing for the Eagles. In the 1950s, Hinkle served as an assistant coach for Drexel in positions including scouting, end, and backfield coach. On February 6, 1958, Drexel announced that Hinkle was promoted to head coach, taking the position of former coach Eddie Allen. Hinkle's tenure was not a success, as the Dragons won only two games in three years (2-20-1); he was let go after the 1960 season.

== Family and death ==
In 1944, Jack married Joane Haggerty. During his time with the Steagles, Joane would cheer on Jack by loudly shouting "Let's Go Honey". This caused the other players on the team to give Jack the nickname "Honey". He was also a cousin of Clarke Hinkle a Hall of Fame fullback with the Green Bay Packers. Hinkle died at his home in Norristown, Pennsylvania from natural causes on November 17, 2006, at the age of 89. He was survived by his wife, his children and grandchildren.

== Head coaching record ==
=== College ===
Year	Team	Overall	Conference	Standing	Bowl/playoffs
Drexel Dragons (Middle Atlantic Conference) (1958–1960)
1958	Drexel	1–7	1–4	6th (Southern College)	
1958	Drexel	1–6	0–5	T–6th (Southern College)	
1960	Drexel	0–7–1	0–6	7th (Southern College)	
Drexel:		2–20–1	1–15		
Total:		2–20–1			
