= Dean Steward =

American football player (1923–1979)

Profile
- Position: Halfback

Personal information
- Born: July 12, 1923; Elizabeth, New Jersey
- Died: July 8, 1979 (aged 55)
- Listed height: 6 ft 0 in (1.83 m)
- Listed weight: 210 lb (95 kg)

Career information
- High school: Parsippany (NJ)
- College: Ursinus College
- NFL draft: 1938: undrafted

Career history
- Phil/Pit Steagles (1943)

Career NFL statistics
- Punts: 2
- Longest Punt: 47 yards
- Yards Per Punt: 42
- Stats at Pro Football Reference

Harold Dean Steward Jr. (1923-1979) was a professional football player in the National Football League. He was a member of the "Steagles", a team that was the result of a temporary merger between the Philadelphia Eagles and Pittsburgh Steelers due to the league-wide manning shortages in 1943 brought on by World War II. Steward was drafted by the military during the war, however he was not called up by his draft board until after the 1943 season. Steward's name is listed on the WW II Honor Roll, which lists the over 1,000 NFL personnel who served in the military during war. The listing of players has been inscribed on a plaque, located at the Pro Football Hall of Fame in Canton, Ohio.
