= Al Wukits =

American football player (1917–1978)

No. 50, 25
- Positions: Guard, center, linebacker

Personal information
- Born: December 16, 1917; Millvale, Pennsylvania, U.S.
- Died: October 15, 1978 (aged 60); Pittsburgh, Pennsylvania, U.S.
- Listed height: 6 ft 3 in (1.91 m)
- Listed weight: 218 lb (99 kg)

Career information
- College: Duquesne
- NFL draft: 1943: 11th round, 97th overall pick

Career history
- Steagles (1943); Card-Pitt (1944); Pittsburgh Steelers (1945); Miami Seahawks (1946); Buffalo Bisons (1946)

Career NFL/AAFC statistics
- Games played: 38
- Games started: 12
- Interceptions: 3
- Stats at Pro Football Reference

Albert Robert Wukits (December 16, 1917 – October 15, 1978) was a professional football player in both the National Football League (NFL) and the All-America Football Conference (AAFC). During his time in the NFL, Wukits played for the "Steagles", which was the temporary merger of the Pittsburgh Steelers and Philadelphia Eagles, in 1943 and "Card-Pitt", the temporary merger of the Steelers and Chicago Cardinals, in 1944. These two teams were the result of temporary mergers brought on the league-wide manning shortages associated with World War II.

However Wukits also played for the Steelers in 1945. In 1946 he left the NFL for the AAFC, where he split that season between playing for the Miami Seahawks and Buffalo Bisons.
