= Joe Frank (American football) =

American football player (1915–1981)

No. 61, 70
- Positions: Guard, Tackle

Personal information
- Born: July 14, 1915; Bronx, New York
- Died: August 11, 1981 (aged 66)

Career information
- College: Georgetown University

Career history
- Philadelphia Eagles (1941–1942); Phil/Pit Steagles (1943)

Career statistics
- Games played: 14
- Stats at Pro Football Reference

Joseph C. Frank (1915–1981) was an American professional football player for the Philadelphia Eagles of the National Football League. However, he was also a member of the "Steagles", a team that was the result of a temporary merger between the Eagles and Pittsburgh Steelers due to the league-wide manning shortages in 1943 brought on by World War II. Prior to his professional career, Joe played at the college level while attending Georgetown University.
