= Rocco Canale =

American football player (1917–1995)

No. 73, 75, 45
- Positions: Tackle, guard

Personal information
- Born: August 15, 1920; Boston, Massachusetts, U.S.
- Died: November 1, 1995 (aged 75); Manhasset, New York, U.S.
- Listed height: 5 ft 11 in (1.80 m)
- Listed weight: 240 lb (109 kg)

Career information
- High school: Watertown (Watertown, New York)
- College: Boston College
- NFL draft: 1943: 9th round, 72nd overall pick

Career history
- Phil/Pit Steagles (1943); Philadelphia Eagles (1944–1945); Boston Yanks (1946–1947)

Awards and highlights
- Second-team All-American (1942); First-team All-Eastern (1942)

Career NFL statistics
- Games played: 38
- Games started: 12
- Fumble recoveries: 2
- Stats at Pro Football Reference

Rocco Peter Canale (August 15, 1920 – November 1, 1995) was an American professional football player in the National Football League (NFL). During his pro career, he split time between the Philadelphia Eagles and the Boston Yanks. However was also a member of the "Steagles", a team that was the result of a temporary merger between the Eagles and Pittsburgh Steelers due to the league-wide manning shortages in 1943 brought on by World War II. Canale's brawny physique earned him the nickname "the Walking Billboard".

== Biography ==
Rocco was born in 1920 in Boston, Massachusetts. He was the son of Nicholas and Josephine Marzano Canale. While attending Watertown High School, he joined the football and wrestling teams. He then quickly becoming one of the school's finest athletes. He graduated in 1939 and received a football scholarship to attend Boston College.

=== College football ===
Prior to his professional career, Canale played at the college level while attending Boston College. There he played as an offensive and defensive lineman. His play would go on to earn him All-American and All-East honors. Canale's blocking and tackling abilities were key factors in Boston College's winning 26 of 31 games played during his varsity career. He was a member of the 1941 Sugar Bowl championship team and the 1943 Orange Bowl squad. He was inducted into the Boston College Varsity Club Athletic Hall of Fame in 1993.

==== Ed McMahon ====
Ed McMahon, who later became Johnny Carson's sidekick on "The Tonight Show", met Canale while he was trying out for Boston College's football team. During a scrimmage, McMahon was assigned to play opposite Canale. While McMahon stopped him once, Canale soon afterwards hit him back even harder. This ended any dreams McMahon had of becoming a football player. 'He creamed me,' McMahon once said, 'and I turned in my uniforms'.

=== Military service ===
In 1943 Canale was selected into the Army, temporarily suspending a professional football career. After training at Greensboro, North Carolina, and Miami Beach, Florida, he was assigned to the First Army Air Force Fighter Command Headquarters located at Mitchell Field in Long Island, New York. He was promoted to corporal in 1944. Canale's name is listed on the World War II Honor Roll, which lists the over 1,000 NFL personnel who served in the military during war. The listing of players has been inscribed on a plaque, located at the Pro Football Hall of Fame in Canton, Ohio.

=== Pro football ===
Canale was drafted in the ninth round in 1943 by Eagles coach, Greasy Neale to play weekend ball with the Eagles. However 1943 saw the Eagles and Steelers merge to form the Steagles. That season, Canale played in seven games, and in the following year, he participated in nine more; his commanding officer was sympathetic to his desire to play pro football, and allowed him to play with the Steagles. Realizing the football talent among them, the First Army Air Force Fighter Command asked Canale play on its team. He played seven games with the Army in 1945 while still playing four professional football games with the Eagles. In 1946, he asked to be traded to the Boston Yanks and played for that team for the rest of his career. Although he decided to return to the Philadelphia Eagles in 1948, an injury ended his football career.

=== Post-football ===
==== Family business ====
After his playing career ended due to an injury, Canale returned home to Watertown to co-manage with his brother, Richard, Canale's Restaurant, the family business. He was the restaurant's president for 30 years.

==== Watertown Red and Black ====
Canale coached the Watertown Red & Black football team, the oldest semi-pro football team in the United States, for three seasons. He ended his coaching career with a 23–2 record. In 1981, he received the Old Timers Certificate of Appreciation by the Red and Black Team of Watertown.

==== Politics ====
Canale was active in the Republican Party during the 1960s. He was named chairman of the GOP Rally in honor of State GOP Comptroller Candidate John P. Lomenzo. In 1962, he was appointed administrative assistant to Senator Henry A. Wise, aiding the former senator while the New York Legislature was in session.

== Family ==
Rocco married Eleanor M. Hilden of Boston, Massachusetts, on December 7, 1943. The couple gave birth to two children, Marcia Canale-Bracken and Nicholas R. Canale.

== Scholarship ==
A scholarship was later created by Canale's wife in his name. It provides Jefferson Community College students who are pursuing an associate degree in physical education the financial opportunity they need to some day coach young adults or become professional athletes.
