= Vic Sears =

American football player (1918–2006)

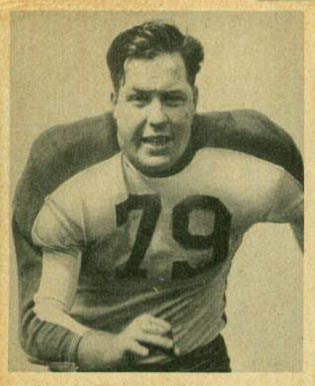
- Sears on a 1948 Bowman football card

No. 79
- Positions: Guard, tackle

Personal information
- Born: March 14, 1918; Ashwood, Oregon, U.S.
- Died: September 22, 2006 (aged 88); Winston-Salem, North Carolina, U.S.
- Listed height: 6 ft 3 in (1.91 m)
- Listed weight: 223 lb (101 kg)

Career information
- College: Oregon State (1937-1940)
- NFL draft: 1941: 5th round, 33rd overall pick

Career history
- Philadelphia Eagles (1941–1942); Phil-Pit Steagles (1943); Philadelphia Eagles (1944–1953)

Awards and highlights
- 2× NFL champion (1948, 1949); 2× Second-team All-Pro (1943, 1949); NFL 1940s All-Decade Team; First-team All-PCC (1940)

Career NFL statistics
- Games played: 131
- Starts: 108
- Interceptions: 1
- Fumble recoveries: 11
- Touchdowns: 2
- Stats at Pro Football Reference

Victor Wilson Sears (March 14, 1918 – September 22, 2006) was an American professional football guard and tackle who played in the National Football League (NFL) for the Philadelphia Eagles from 1941 through 1953.

A two-time NFL champion, Sears was named a member of the NFL's All-1940s team.

== Biography ==
=== Early life ===
Vic Sears was born March 14, 1918, in Ashwood, a ghost town located in Central Oregon.

=== Collegiate career ===
Sears in a ferocious publicity pose, 1940.

He played college football at Oregon State College, where he was a member of Phi Sigma Kappa fraternity. Playing for head coach Lon Stiner, Sears experienced great success at the collegiate level in his junior year, helping the Beavers to victory in the 1940 Pineapple Bowl.

Sears in 1940.

Heading into the 1940 season, a writer for Illustrated Football Annual touted Sears as one of two Beaver seniors "ripe for recognition from All-America pickers." Sears "dishes out a terrific exhibition of football every time he goes into action," the pundit observed.

=== Professional career ===
Sears was selected in the fifth round of the 1941 NFL draft by the Pittsburgh Steelers, who made him the 33rd overall pick of the draft. He was promptly traded to the Philadelphia Eagles for whom he played his first game in 1941.

His consistent play as a Tackle and Defensive Tackle earned him recognition as a member of the NFL's 1940s All-Decade Team. Mid-career, at the height of World War II, Sears played as a member of the "Steagles", a team that was the result of the temporary merger between his own Philadelphia Eagles and the Pittsburgh Steelers during the league-wide manpower shortages in 1943 brought on by World War II.

Nicknamed "Old Smoothie", Sears was active as a player until 1953, accounting for 12 defense-scored points during his playing career.

=== Death and legacy ===
Sears died September 22, 2006, in Winston-Salem, North Carolina. He was 88 years old at the time of his death.
