= Ted Doyle =

American football player (1914–2006)

- Doyle in 1940

No. 28, 72, 29
- Position: Lineman

Personal information
- Born: January 12, 1914; Maywood, Nebraska, U.S.
- Died: October 6, 2006 (aged 92); Omaha, Nebraska, U.S.
- Listed height: 6 ft 2 in (1.88 m)
- Listed weight: 224 lb (102 kg)

Career information
- High school: Curtis (NE)
- College: Nebraska
- NFL draft: 1938: 8th round, 68th overall pick

Career history
- Pittsburgh Pirates (1938–1939); Pittsburgh Steelers (1940–1942); Steagles (1943); Card-Pitt (1944); Pittsburgh Steelers (1945)

Awards and highlights
- 2× Second-team All-Big Six (1936, 1937); Nebraska Football Hall of Fame, 1990

Career NFL statistics
- Games played: 74
- Games started: 23
- Touchdowns: 1
- Stats at Pro Football Reference

Theodore Dennison Doyle (January 12, 1914 — October 6, 2006) was an American professional football player who was a tackle and guard for eight seasons in the National Football League (NFL). Following a collegiate career playing football for the Nebraska Cornhuskers, Doyle was selected by the New York Giants in the eighth round of the 1938 NFL draft.

Doyle would play in the NFL from 1938 through 1945 for the various iterations of Art Rooney's Pittsburgh Steelers franchise, including the 1943 joint operation with the Philadelphia Eagles, nicknamed the "Steagles", and the 1944 combination with the Chicago Cardinals, remembered to football historians as Card-Pitt.

== Early life ==
Ted Doyle was born January 12, 1914, in Maywood, Nebraska. He attended Curtis High School in Curtis, Nebraska, where he played football for the Aggies as an undersized 145-pounder. Despite making the high school team, he never managed to earn an athletic letter for football.

Doyle was therefore not a star recruit and was actually out of school for a year before he enrolled at the University of Nebraska in 1934.

== College career ==
Doyle played college football for the Cornhuskers varsity team from 1935 until 1937 for head coach Dana X. Bible, winning Big Six Conference championships during this interval.

Doyle was a late bloomer, putting on mass during his college years. By his senior year he weighed in at 215 pounds — among the largest linemen on the Nebraska squad. His forte seems to have been on the defensive side of the ball, with one contemporary news account calling him "seldom flashy" but "dependable and tough to gain ground through."

== Professional career ==
He was selected by the New York Giants in the 8th round of the 1938 NFL draft, with the Giants making Doyle the 68th pick overall of the lottery. He wound up on the roster of the fledgling Pittsburgh Pirates franchise owned by Art Rooney, however. Doyle would play in the NFL without interruption from 1938 through 1946, always taking the field for the various iterations of Rooney's franchise, which became the Pittsburgh Steelers in 1940, a joint operation with the Philadelphia Eagles, nicknamed the "Steagles" in 1943, and a new combination with the Chicago Cardinals, remembered to football historians as Card-Pitt, in 1944.

This continuity was not the norm in this era. When America entered World War II at the end of the 1941 NFL season, hundreds of players entered the military, either as volunteers or through the draft. In 1943, Doyle was exempt from conscription based on his 3-A draft status for being a father. He was able to continue playing pro football throughout the war as he was engaged stateside in military-related work for the Westinghouse Electric Company. It was later revealed that he had played a small part in the Manhattan Project, America's effort to build the atomic bomb.

Decades later Doyle referred to his stint with Card-Pitt as "a strange time," splitting his days between Westinghouse and football. He stated that playing for Card-Pitt was not a lot of fun and said sometimes that only a couple hundred people would show up for a game. According to Doyle, many players kept hoping that the war would finally end because once it did, all player contracts would become void.

After the war ended in the summer of 1945, Doyle played one final season for the Steelers, retiring from the game at the age of 31. Interestingly, the 1945 Steelers season would be the only one in which he started every game, locking down the role of regular right tackle for the team.

== Life after football ==
After his time in the NFL was over, Doyle became an assistant football coach at Fairbury Junior College in Nebraska.

He was appointed president of the Nebraska Community College Trustees Association in 1981.

== Death and legacy ==
He was inducted into Nebraska's football hall of fame in 1990.

Doyle died in October 2006 of heart disease. He was 92 years old at the time of his death.
