= Pennsylvania Keystoners =

Former proposed NFL team

The Pennsylvania Keystoners was the idea for an American football team thought up by then-Pittsburgh Pirates owner, Art Rooney, in 1939 to have a single National Football League franchise based in both Pittsburgh and Philadelphia. The team would play half of its home games in each location.

During their early histories, the Pirates and the Eagles were among the weakest in the league. In his first eight years of operating the Pittsburgh franchise, Pirates founder Art Rooney was estimated to have lost $100,000. Meanwhile, the Eagles were owned by a syndicate headed by Bert Bell, however the team lost $80,000 and 21 games in its first three seasons. Soon all of the team's investors left the franchise, and by the end of the 1935 season Bert Bell had the Eagles to himself. He became the coach, general manager, scout and public relations director, and took to selling tickets on downtown Philadelphia street corners. Because the rent was cheap, the team played in the 102,000 seat Municipal Stadium before at least 100,000 empty seats. According to one account, one rainy Sunday, only 50 people showed up for a game against the Brooklyn Dodgers; Bell invited those few fans up to the covered press box, where he provided free coffee and hot dogs. Neither the Eagles nor the Pirates-Steelers had posted a winning record in their first eight years of existence. Losses on the field were compounded by the combined loss of about $190,000 in Depression dollars.

The Steelers were so bad that Rooney sold them at the end of the 1940 season to Alexis Thompson, a 26-year-old steel heir from Boston frequently described in the press as "a well-heeled New York City playboy". Thompson renamed the Steelers the Ironmen, but he planned to move the franchise to Boston and play games in Fenway Park. Eagles owner Bert Bell brokered the deal between Rooney and Thompson for $160,000, and Rooney used $80,000 of the proceeds to buy a partnership in the Eagles, which at the time was owned by Bell. The deal also involved the trade of several players between the two teams.

The two owners planned to field a combined Philadelphia-Pittsburgh team called the Keystoners that would play home games in both cities. The original proposition was that Thompson would buy the franchise and take the Pittsburgh club to Boston and Bell and Rooney would pool their interests in the Eagles to form a Philadelphia-Pittsburgh club, splitting the home games between Forbes Field in Pittsburgh and Philadelphia's Municipal Stadium. Thompson, however, was unable to secure a place to play in Boston. After meeting with Rooney, plans changed whereby Thompson's club (ostensibly the former Steelers) would play in Philadelphia as the Eagles, while the Rooney-Bell owned team would play in Pittsburgh as the Steelers, effectively trading the two clubs between their cities.

Before the 1941 season, Rooney returned the name to Steelers back from the Ironmen. Bell began the season as the Steelers' coach, but after two losses, Rooney hired Aldo Donelli. Bell continued as part owner of the Steelers until 1946 when he was elected NFL commissioner. Bell served as commissioner until 1959 when he died of a heart attack at Franklin Field in Philadelphia during a game between two teams he had helped form, the Steelers and the Eagles.

The notion for a single team between the two cities was revived, when for one season in 1943, forced to do so by player shortfalls brought on by World War II, the two clubs temporarily merged as the Philadelphia-Pittsburgh "Steagles". The league only approved the merger for one year; Pittsburgh was willing to merge again for 1944 but not Philadelphia. This forced the Steelers to merge with the Chicago Cardinals (as Card-Pitt) for 1944.
