= Enio Conti =

American football player (1913–2005)

No. 67, 51
- Position: Guard

Personal information
- Born: February 15, 1913; Naples, Italy
- Died: May 22, 2005 (aged 92); Tallahassee, Florida, U.S.
- Listed height: 5 ft 11 in (1.80 m)
- Listed weight: 204 lb (93 kg)

Career information
- High school: New Utrecht (Brooklyn, New York, U.S.)
- College: Arkansas; Bucknell (1934-1937)
- NFL draft: 1938: undrafted

Career history
- Philadelphia Eagles (1941–1942); Phil/Pit Steagles (1943); Philadelphia Eagles (1944–1945)

Awards and highlights
- Pro Bowl (1942)

Career NFL statistics
- Games played: 40
- Games started: 25
- Interceptions: 1
- Stats at Pro Football Reference

Enio Edward "Ed" Conti (February 15, 1913 – May 22, 2005) was a professional American football guard in the National Football League for five seasons for the Philadelphia Eagles. He was also a member of the "Steagles", a team that was the result of a temporary merger between the Eagles and Pittsburgh Steelers due to the league-wide manning shortages in 1943 brought on by World War II.

Conti was named head coach of the Bethlehem Bulldogs, a Bethlehem, Pennsylvania-based team in the American Football League, the Eagles' minor league affiliate during their inaugural campaign in 1946. He was replaced by former Lehigh University head coach Leo Prendergast in 1947, and accepted a position as head coach of the football team at Bangor High School in Bangor, Pennsylvania.
