= Ben Kish =

American football player (1917–1989)

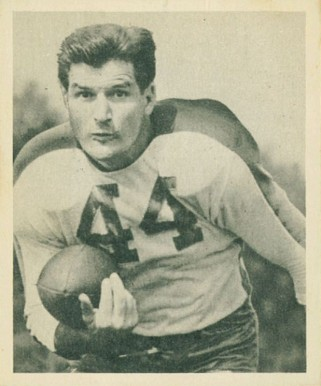
- Kish on a 1948 Bowman football card

No. 20, 44
- Positions: Fullback, Safety

Personal information
- Born: March 31, 1917; Tonawanda, New York, U.S.
- Died: February 24, 1989 (aged 71); Coatesville, Pennsylvania, U.S.
- Listed height: 6 ft 0 in (1.83 m)
- Listed weight: 207 lb (94 kg)

Career information
- High school: Tonawanda
- College: Pittsburgh (1936–1939)
- NFL draft: 1940: 8th round, 61st overall pick

Career history
- Brooklyn Dodgers (1940–1941); Steagles (1943); Philadelphia Eagles (1944–1949)

Awards and highlights
- 2× NFL champion (1948, 1949); National champion (1937)

Career NFL statistics
- Rushing yards: 344
- Rushing average: 4.6
- Receptions: 38
- Receiving yards: 420
- Interceptions: 18
- Total touchdowns: 4
- Stats at Pro Football Reference

Benjamin Ernest Kish (March 31, 1917 – February 24, 1989) was a professional American football safety in the National Football League (NFL) for the Brooklyn Dodgers and Philadelphia Eagles. He was also a member of the "Steagles", a team that was the result of a temporary merger between the Eagles and Pittsburgh Steelers due to the league-wide manning shortages in 1943 brought on by World War II. He played college football at the University of Pittsburgh and was drafted in the eighth round of the 1940 NFL draft.

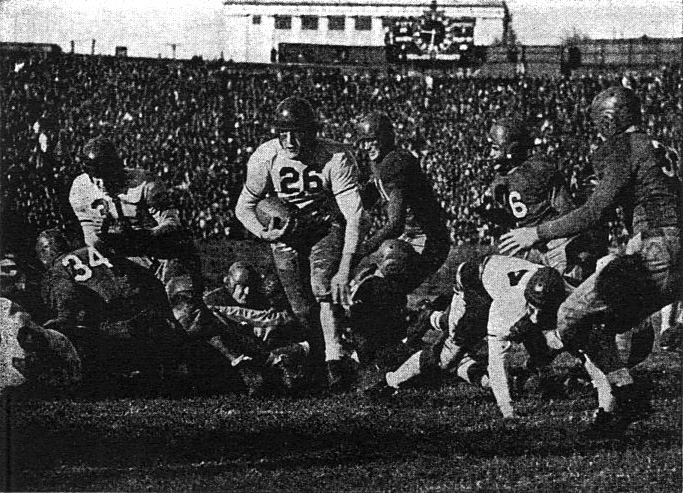
Ben Kish running the ball in a University of Pittsburgh win over SMU at Pitt Stadium
