= Bob Thurbon =

American football player and coach (1918–2000)

No. 49, 39, 83
- Position: Halfback

Personal information
- Born: February 22, 1918; Erie, Pennsylvania, U.S.
- Died: September 11, 2000 (aged 82); Charlotte, North Carolina, U.S.
- Listed height: 5 ft 10 in (1.78 m)
- Listed weight: 176 lb (80 kg)

Career information
- High school: Erie Academy
- College: Pittsburgh (1937-1940)
- NFL draft: 1943: undrafted

Career history

Playing
- Steagles (1943); Card-Pitt (1944); Buffalo Bisons (1946)

Coaching
- Football: North East HS (PA) (1954–1955) Backfield coach; Edinboro (1956–1959) Head coach; Basketball: Edinboro (1956–1959) Head coach

Career NFL/AAFC statistics
- Rushing yards: 478
- Rushing average: 3.3
- Receptions: 14
- Receiving yards: 231
- Total touchdowns: 11
- Stats at Pro Football Reference

Head coaching record
- Career: College: 15–16–2 (.485)

Robert William Thurbon (February 22, 1918 – September 11, 2000) was an American football player and coach of football and basketball. He played professionally as a halfback in the National Football League (NFL) with the Steagles and Card-Pitt and the All-America Football Conference (AAFC) with the Buffalo Bisons.

== Formative years ==
Thurbon was born in Erie, Pennsylvania on February 22, 1918. He subsequently played college football at the University of Pittsburgh.

== Professional football career ==
Thurbon was a halfback in the National Football League (NFL) who played for the Steagles and Card-Pitt and the All-America Football Conference (AAFC) with the Buffalo Bisons.

Thurbon then became a teacher and backfield coach under Joe Setcavage at North East High School in North East, Pennsylvania.

Subsequently hired as the head football coach at Edinboro State Teachers College (now known as PennWest Edinboro), he coached there from 1956 to 1959, compiling a record of 15–16–2. In addition, he served as the head basketball coach at Edinboro from 1956 to 1959, tallying a mark of 23–37.

== Head coaching record ==
Year	Team	Overall	Conference	Standing	Bowl/playoffs
Edinboro Fighting Scots (Pennsylvania State Teachers College Conference) (1956–1959)
1956	Edinboro	5–4	3–2	7th	
1957	Edinboro	3–4	2–1	4th	
1958	Edinboro	4–4–1	2–4–1	T–8th	
1959	Edinboro	3–4–1	2–3–1	T–9th	
Edinboro:		15–16–2	9–10–2		
Total:		15–16–2			
