= Eberle Schultz =

American football player (1917–2002)

No. 48, 71, 40
- Positions: Guard, tackle

Personal information
- Born: December 23, 1917; Eugene, Oregon, U.S.
- Died: May 20, 2002 (aged 84); Eureka, California, U.S.
- Listed height: 6 ft 4 in (1.93 m)
- Listed weight: 252 lb (114 kg)

Career information
- High school: Oregon City (OR)
- College: Oregon State
- NFL draft: 1940: 4th round, 28th overall pick

Career history
- Philadelphia Eagles (1940); Pittsburgh Steelers (1941–1942); "Steagles" (1943); "Card-Pitt" (1944); Cleveland/Los Angeles Rams (1945–1947)

Awards and highlights
- NFL champion (1945); Third-team All-American (1939); First-team All-PCC (1939)

Career NFL statistics
- Games played: 86
- Games started: 61
- Fumble recoveries: 3
- Stats at Pro Football Reference

Eberle Hynson "Elbie" Schultz (December 23, 1917 – May 20, 2002) was an American football player in the National Football League (NFL) from 1940 to 1947. An All-American lineman for Oregon State University during his collegiate days, Schultz was drafted into the NFL in 1940 by the Philadelphia Eagles. He also played for the Pittsburgh Steelers, and the Rams, as well as two combined-franchise wartime teams during the course of an 8-year professional career.

Schultz was a member of the Cleveland Rams team that won the 1945 NFL Championship. During his years after the NFL he worked as a football coach, game official, and automobile dealer in Eureka, California.

== Biography ==
=== Early life ===
Eberle Hynson Schultz, known to friends by the nickname "Elbie" in his younger years, was born December 23, 1917, in Eugene, Oregon. He grew up in the historic town of Oregon City.

=== Collegiate career ===
The 6'4" Schultz attended Oregon State College in Corvallis, Oregon, where he was an All-American lineman for the collegiate football team in 1939, helping to lead the Beavers to a 9–1–1 record. Schultz became the 6th All-American in the history of the OSU football program. As was the case with most football players of his era, Schultz played on both the offensive and defensive sides of the ball, gaining particular accolades for his play as an offensive left guard.

Schultz was also named the Beavers' "Most Aggressive Lineman" following the 1939 season and had his named inscribed at the top of the new Otto Sitton Memorial Plaque as a permanent remembrance of this honor.

Schultz also briefly fought as an amateur boxer in the heavyweight division during his collegiate years, losing by decision in his first foray in the ring.

=== Professional career ===
Left guard Elbie Schultz (#71) as a member of the 1943 "Steagles" team.

Schultz was a draft pick of the National Football League's Philadelphia Eagles in 1940, going in the fourth round as the league's 28th overall pick.

Schultz played for a series of NFL teams during the decade of the 1940s, including the Eagles, Pittsburgh Steelers, and the Rams. During the years of World War II, Schultz played for two teams composed of temporarily merged NFL franchises, including the "Steagles" (members of the Steelers and Eagles) in 1943 and "Card-Pitt" (members of the Steelers and the Chicago Cardinals) in 1944.

In October 1944, Schultz was at the epicenter of a brief player strike that rocked the Card-Pitt team. Together with star halfback Johnny Butler and fullback Johnny Grigas, Schultz was fined $200 by coaches Walt Kiesling and Phil Handler for alleged "indifferent play" following a loss to the Chicago Bears. The trio protested the unfairness of the relatively massive penalty and on October 18 the entire team refused to practice, forcing a meeting between players and club management. The conflict was shortly resolved, although Butler stormed out of the meeting and was indefinitely suspended by the team.

Schultz was popular with his teammates and in August 1946 was elected by his peers as team captain of the Los Angeles Rams. Shultz moved from left guard to left tackle towards the end of his pro career, appearing in 85 regular season NFL games over the 8 seasons of his career.

Schultz played his last football in the 1947 NFL season. Schultz's return to the Rams was made problematic when in April 1948 he sued the club for breach of contract, alleging that the team had failed to find him the off-season employment promised if he moved his residence to Los Angeles. Schultz contended that the two-year contract he signed with the Rams in August 1946 guaranteed to pay him $10,000 per season for the 1946 and 1947 campaigns, with an additional clause requiring the team to find him a job comparable to the $450 per month position he left in Oregon City, Oregon, by March 1, 1948, or pay a penalty of $5,000. Named as defendants in the suit were team majority owner Dan Reeves and three other principals of the club. While he would eventually win his $5,000 suit against the team, a contract for 1948 from the Rams was consequently not forthcoming.

In July 1948, Schultz signed an $8,000 contract with the Los Angeles Dons of the rival All-America Football Conference (AAFC) to play in the forthcoming 1948 season. He reported to the team's training camp in August but was cut by the team 12 days later and paid only $500 of the contracted sum. Schultz filed yet another lawsuit, seeking payment of his full salary from the Dons. Although he prevailed in this second lawsuit as well as the first, Schultz's career in professional football was effectively at an end.

=== Years after the NFL ===
License plate frame from Eb Schultz's Redwood Motors, circa 1970s.

Following the end of his pro football career, Schultz moved to the North Coast of California, settling in Eureka in 1949. He briefly toyed with entering the coaching profession, serving as an assistant coach of the football team at Humboldt State College in neighboring Arcata, California. Unable to land a permanent position as a Lumberjacks coach, in 1953 Schultz turned to part-time collegiate officiating. He remained an active official throughout the decade of the 1950s.

Schultz's main occupation in the years after football involved the selling of automobiles. He took a job as a salesman for a Eureka dealer of Cadillacs and Oldsmobiles, remaining with the company for seven years. In 1957, he moved over to a new Volkswagen dealership, Redwood Motors, where he took a position as sales manager. Schultz would join with a business partner to purchase this company in July 1959, before buying his partner out and assuming complete ownership early in 1962.

Schultz was a leading member of the local Kiwanis club and was elected multiple times to the board of directors of the California Association of Employers, a business lobbying group. About 1962 he was named to the Eureka Planning Commission, in charge of construction zoning regulations.

During the early 1960s, Schultz renewed his connection to the game of football as a coach of the semi-pro Humboldt Forresters, a team sponsored by the Redwood Empire Athletic Club.

Schultz was elected as president of the Eureka Chamber of Commerce for 1976.

Schultz's met his wife, the former Irene Kezsely (1923–2013), while in Cleveland with the Rams, for whom she worked as part of the front office staff. The pair married on May 3, 1947. In Eureka Irene Schultz was active in local civic organizations and gained some reputation as a formidable local bowler. Together the couple had five children.

=== Death and legacy ===
Eberle Schultz, who went by the nickname "Eb" in his later years, died May 20, 2002, in his adopted hometown of Eureka, California. He was 84 years old at the time of his death.

== See also ==
- 1946 Los Angeles Rams season
