= Bob Masters =

American football player (1913–1987)

Profile
- Position: Halfback

Personal information
- Born: January 16, 1913; Comanche, Texas, U.S.
- Died: February 8, 1987 (aged 74); Dallas County, Texas, U.S.

Career information
- College: Baylor University

Career history
- 1937–1942: Philadelphia Eagles
- 1943: Phil-Pit Steagles
- 1943–1944: Chicago Bears

Awards and highlights
- NFL champion (1943)

Bob Masters (January 16, 1913 – February 8, 1987) was an American professional football player who was a halfback for seven seasons in the National Football League (NFL) with the Philadelphia Eagles, Chicago Bears, and the Steagles, a team that was the result of a temporary merger between the Eagles and Pittsburgh Steelers due to the league-wide manning shortages in 1943 brought on by World War II.
