= Ernie Steele =

American football player (1917–2006)

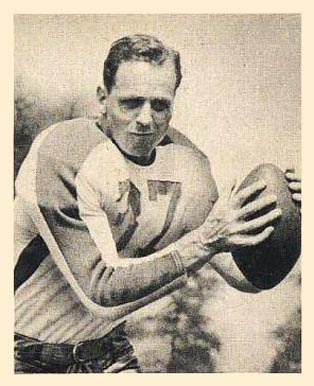
- Steele on a 1948 Bowman football card

No. 37
- Positions: Running back, defensive back

Personal information
- Born: November 2, 1917; Bothell, Washington, U.S.
- Died: October 16, 2006 (aged 88); Seattle, Washington, U.S.
- Listed height: 6 ft 0 in (1.83 m)
- Listed weight: 187 lb (85 kg)

Career information
- High school: Burien (WA) Highline
- College: Washington (1938-1941)
- NFL draft: 1942: 10th round, 81st overall pick

Career history
- Philadelphia Eagles (1942); "Steagles" (1943); Philadelphia Eagles (1944–1948)

Awards and highlights
- NFL champion (1948)

Career NFL statistics
- Rushing yards: 1,337
- Rushing average: 5.2
- Receptions: 31
- Receiving yards: 520
- Total touchdowns: 18
- Stats at Pro Football Reference

Ernest Raymond Steele (November 2, 1917 – October 16, 2006) was an American professional football running back in the National Football League (NFL) for the Philadelphia Eagles, and the "Steagles", a team that resulted in the temporary merger of the Eagles and Pittsburgh Steelers in 1943. A graduate of Highline High School in Burien, Washington (which made him a charter member of its Athletic Hall of Fame in 1999), he played college football at the University of Washington and was drafted in the tenth round of the 1942 NFL draft by the Pittsburgh Steelers.

He played in two NFL championship games for the Philadelphia Eagles.

After ending his football career, Steele opened a diner and sports bar in Seattle, named "Ernie Steele's." It became a landmark and operated under that name until he sold it in 1993. After the sale it was known for eight years as Ileen's Sports Bar, but the back was called "The Ernie Room." Since 2001, it has been a drag bar called Julia's.

Steele died in Seattle, Washington, on October 16, 2006.

== NFL career statistics ==
Legend
	Won the NFL Championship
**Bold**	Career high

Year	Team	Games		Rushing					Receiving				
Year	Team	GP	GS	Att	Yds	Avg	Lng	TD	Rec	Yds	Avg	Lng	TD
1942	PHI	10	1	24	124	5.2	55	0	7	114	16.3	36	1
1943	PHI-PITT	10	1	**85**	**409**	4.8	47	4	**9**	**168**	18.7	**60**	**2**
1944	PHI	9	2	59	247	4.2	**56**	**5**	1	22	**22.0**	22	0
1945	PHI	7	1	20	212	**10.6**	46	1	3	42	14.0	31	0
1946	PHI	9	4	31	108	3.5	43	1	5	69	13.8	24	0
1947	PHI	12	5	26	138	5.3	49	1	4	62	15.5	44	0
1948	PHI	12	2	13	99	7.6	**56**	1	2	43	21.5	32	1
Career		69	16	258	1,337	5.2	56	13	31	520	16.8	60	4
