= Steve Sader =

American football player (1916–1946)

No. 33
- Position: Fullback

Personal information
- Born: June 6, 1916; New York, U.S.
- Died: May 6, 1946 (aged 29)
- Listed height: 5 ft 11 in (1.80 m)
- Listed weight: 180 lb (82 kg)

Career information
- High school: South Philadelphia (PA)
- College: None

Career history
- Phil/Pit Steagles (1943) Phil Eagles 1944

Career statistics
- Games played: 2
- Rushing attempts: 3
- Rushing yards: 5
- Rushing average: 1.7
- Rushing touchdowns: 0
- Stats at Pro Football Reference

Stephen J. J. Sader (June 6, 1916 – May 6, 1946) was a professional football player for the Philadelphia Eagles of the National Football League in 1943 and 1944. However, he was also a member of the 1943 “Steagles”, a team that was the result of a temporary merger between the Eagles and Pittsburgh Steelers due to the league-wide player shortages in 1943 brought on by World War II.

Prior to his career in the NFL, Sader was a standout local sandlot player with no professional experience who played fullback and was the kicker for Bill Morrow's Shamrocks, a South Philadelphia sandlot team and Captained the team for four years. He also excelled as a catcher in hardball and played for Morrow's Baseball Shamrocks, Manoa, and the Wilmington Clippers.

Additionally, it has been reported he had been entertaining offers from several major league teams as a catcher, one of which was the Brooklyn Dodgers.

In 1938 he was awarded a Silver Medal in the Junior Olympics for the shot put at the age of 22. The AAU Junior Olympic games originated from “telegraphic“ state track and field competitions. National champions were determined through telephone and/or mail entries instead of head-to-head competition. In 1949, the AAU conducted its first “live“ national meet in Cleveland, Ohio. The first live AAU Junior Olympic Games opened on August 21, 1967 in downtown Washington DC.

Sader had a contract for the 1944 season and was put on waivers to a new team being started up in Boston by Kate Smith's husband. Unfortunately, toward the end of the season he was diagnosed with Hodgkin's Disease. He died in May 1946 at the Philadelphia Naval Hospital leaving a wife, Mary Agnes Sader (Reardon) and a son, Stephen M. Sader as survivors.
