= Larry Cabrelli =

American football player and coach (1917–1974)

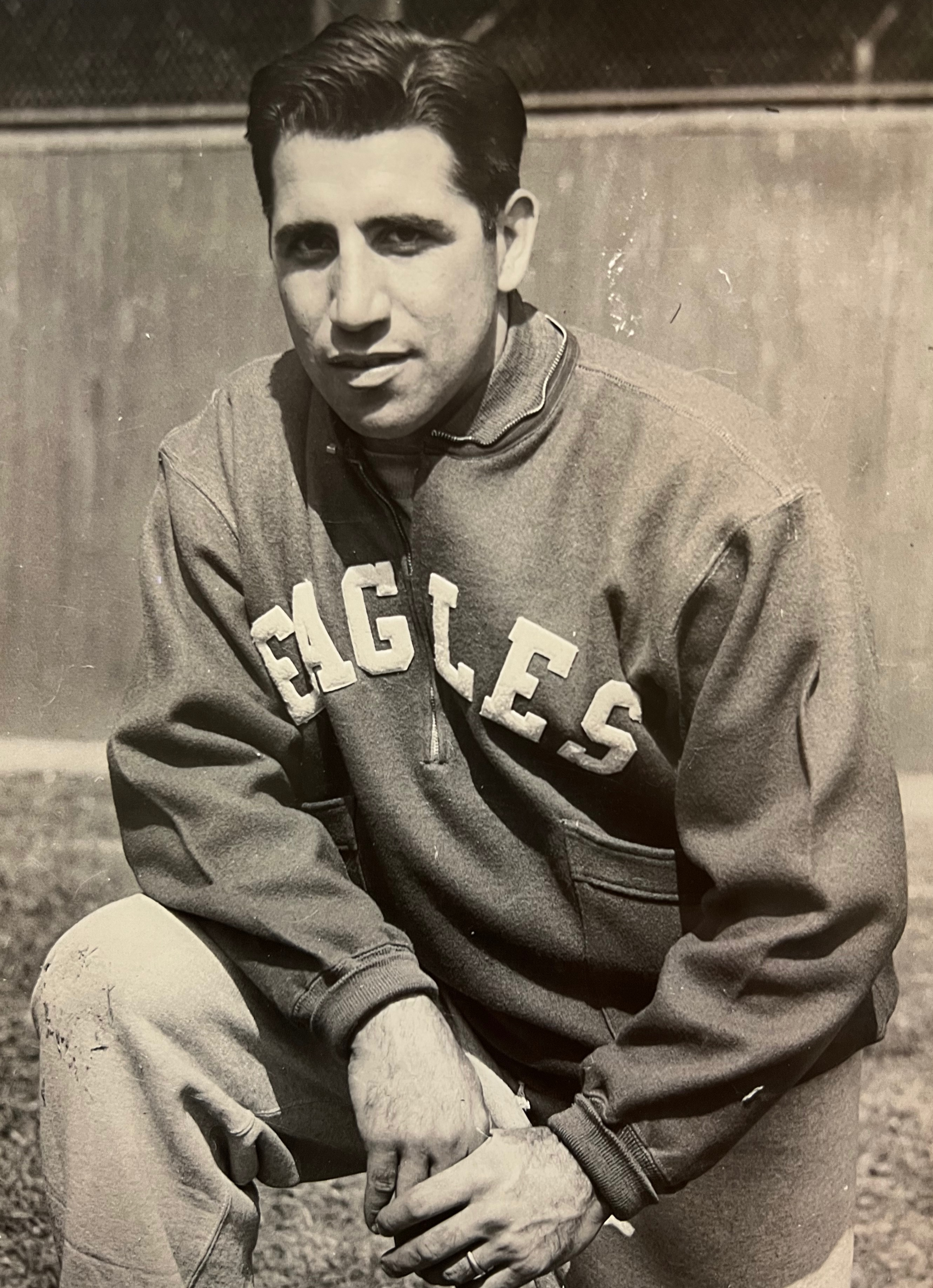

Profile
- Positions: Tight end, defensive back

Personal information
- Born: March 28, 1917; Newark, New Jersey, U.S.
- Died: June 5, 1974 (aged 57); Bryn Mawr, Pennsylvania, U.S.

Career information
- College: Colgate University

Career history
- 1941–1942: Philadelphia Eagles
- 1943: Phil-Pitt Steagles
- 1944–1949: Philadelphia Eagles
- Stats at Pro Football Reference

Lawrence Andrew Cabrelli (March 28, 1917 – June 5, 1974) was a professional football player and assistant coach in the National Football League (NFL). He began his pro career in 1941, after his graduation from Colgate University, where he also played college football and was inducted into their Hall of Honors in 2013. In the NFL, Cabrelli played offense (tight end) and defense (end) for the Philadelphia Eagles. He was also a member of the "Steagles", a team that was the result of a temporary merger between the Eagles and Pittsburgh Steelers due to the league-wide manning shortages in 1943 brought on by World War II. From 1948 to 1950, he was an assistant coach for the Eagles under head coach, Greasy Neale. During his time as an Eagles coach, the team won two NFL Championships in 1948 and 1949. After leaving the Eagles in 1950, Cabrelli was named an assistant coach for the Washington Redskins. He finished his pro career as an assistant coach with the Winnipeg Blue Bombers of the Canadian Football League.

At the outbreak of World War II, Cabrelli joined the military. However, he was classified as "4-F" for "bad knees" and returned to playing football for the 1942 season. Cabrelli's name is listed on the WW II Honor Roll, which lists the over 1,000 NFL personnel who served in the military during war. The listing of players has been inscribed on a plaque, located at the Pro Football Hall of Fame in Canton, Ohio.
