= Tom Miller (American football) =

American football player (1918–2005)

No. 89, 69, 14, 76
- Positions: Defensive end, end

Personal information
- Born: May 22, 1918; Milton, Pennsylvania, U.S.
- Died: December 2, 2005 (aged 87); Green Bay, Wisconsin, U.S.
- Listed height: 6 ft 2 in (1.88 m)
- Listed weight: 202 lb (92 kg)

Career information
- High school: Fork Union Military Academy (Fork Union, Virginia)
- College: Hampden-Sydney (1942)
- NFL draft: 1943: undrafted

Career history
- Philadelphia Eagles (1943–1944); Washington Redskins (1945); Green Bay Packers (1946)

Career NFL statistics
- Receptions: 22
- Receiving yards: 279
- Receiving touchdowns: 1
- Stats at Pro Football Reference

Thomas Marshall Miller (May 22, 1918 – December 2, 2005) was an American professional football player and executive in the National Football League (NFL). He played as an end. He became an executive for the Green Bay Packers, earning induction into the Packers Hall of Fame in 1999 for his work as an administrator and general manager for the team.

Miller played college football for the Hampden–Sydney Tigers before playing in the NFL for the Philadelphia Eagles, the Washington Redskins, and the Packers. He also played for the Steagles, a team that was created when the Philadelphia Eagles and Pittsburgh Steelers merged in 1943 due to the lack of players (most were fighting in World War II).
