= Charlie Gauer =

American football player and coach (1921–1973)

No. 32
- Positions: Fullback, End

Personal information
- Born: September 24, 1921; Chicago, Illinois, U.S.
- Died: October 22, 1973 (aged 52)

Career information
- College: Colgate

Career history
- Phil/Pit Steagles (1943); Philadelphia Eagles (1944–1945)
- Stats at Pro Football Reference

Charles Edward Gauer (September 24, 1921 – October 22, 1973) was a professional football player, and later an assistant coach, for the Philadelphia Eagles of the National Football League (NFL). However, he was also a member of the "Steagles," a team that was the result of a temporary merger between the Eagles and Pittsburgh Steelers due to the league-wide manning shortages in 1943 brought on by World War II.

As an assistant coach, he helped develop the wide receivers and tight ends for the Philadelphia Eagles from 1952-1961 and 1969-1970.
