= Ray Reutt =

American football player (1917–2004)

Profile
- Position: End

Personal information
- Born: March 4, 1917; Norfolk, Virginia
- Died: August 18, 2004 (aged 87)

Career information
- College: Virginia Military Institute

Career history
- Phil/Pit Steagles (1943)
- Stats at Pro Football Reference

Raymond Francis "Buster" Reutt (March 4, 1917 – August 18, 2004) was a professional football player for one season, 1943, in the National Football League. He was a member of the "Steagles", a team that was the result of a temporary merger between the Philadelphia Eagles and Pittsburgh Steelers due to the league-wide manning shortages in 1943 brought on by World War II. He was also an alumnus of the Virginia Military Institute.
