= Ted Laux =

American football player (1916–1965)

No. 27
- Positions: Halfback, Defensive Back, Quarterback

Personal information
- Born: March 1, 1916; Swedesboro, New Jersey
- Died: November 5, 1965 (aged 49)

Career information
- College: Saint Joseph's University

Career history
- 1943: Phil-Pitt Steagles
- 1944: Philadelphia Eagles

Theodore Laux (1916-1965) was a professional football player in the National Football League for the Philadelphia Eagles. He was also a member of the "Steagles", a team that was the result of a temporary merger between the Eagles and Pittsburgh Steelers due to the league-wide manning shortages in 1943 brought on by World War II. Prior to his pro career, Laux played at the college level for Saint Joseph's University. Prior to that he played in high school for Collingswood High School. At Collingswood he lettered for four seasons in football and was a three-year starter in baseball and basketball. He led the football team to South Jersey titles in 1934 and 1935 and twice received All-Conference honors. He was inducted into the school's hall of fame in 1993.

After his career with the Eagles ended, Laux played independent baseball and football for years in the South Jersey area. He moved to California where he later died.
