= Tony Bova =

American football player (1917–1973)

No. 31, 85, 41
- Positions: End, Halfback

Personal information
- Born: August 21, 1917; Pittsburgh, Pennsylvania, U.S.
- Died: October 15, 1973 (aged 56)

Career information
- High school: The Kiski School
- College: Saint Francis University

Career history
- Pittsburgh Steelers (1942, 1945–1947); Steagles (1943); Card-Pitt (1944)

Career statistics
- Receptions: 60
- Receiving yards: 1,129
- Receiving touchdowns: 7
- Stats at Pro Football Reference

Anthony J. Bova (August 21, 1917 – October 15, 1973) was an American professional football player for the Pittsburgh Steelers during the 1940s. He graduated from The Kiski School and then Saint Francis University, located in Loretto, Pennsylvania, in 1943. He was 6'1" and weighed 190 pounds when he played for the Steelers during World War II, when they temporarily merged with the Philadelphia Eagles (in 1943) and Chicago Cardinals (in 1944) to form the "Steagles" and "Card-Pitt". He played end, halfback, and quarterback during his career from 1942 to 1947. In 1942 he also played left end on defense and in 1947 scored a safety. In 1943 Bova led the NFL in average gain per completed pass in 1943, netting 419 yards in 19 completed aerials.

He was also blind in one eye and partially blind in the other. He joined the United States Navy during World War II and reported for duty in February 1943 as a Seabee. He was soon discharged from the navy due to his vision.

Bova is also listed on the NFL honor roll, located at the Pro Football Hall of Fame, which lists the over 1,000 NFL personnel who served in the military during World War II.

He died of a heart attack in 1973. He is buried in the Mt. Royal Cemetery in Glenshaw, Pennsylvania.
