= Johnny Butler (running back) =

American football player (1918–1963)

- Butler in 1943

No. 27, 23, 19
- Position: Halfback

Personal information
- Born: September 10, 1918; Knoxville, Tennessee, U.S.
- Died: April 23, 1963 (aged 44); Atlanta, Georgia, U.S.
- Listed height: 5 ft 10 in (1.78 m)
- Listed weight: 185 lb (84 kg)

Career information
- High school: Knoxville
- College: Tennessee (1938-1941)
- NFL draft: 1942: 7th round, 51st overall pick

Career history
- Steagles (1943); Card-Pitt (1944); Brooklyn Tigers (1944); Philadelphia Eagles (1945); Bethlehem Bulldogs (1946)

Career NFL statistics
- Rushing yards: 517
- Rushing average: 3.1
- Receptions: 8
- Receiving yards: 186
- Total touchdowns: 6
- Stats at Pro Football Reference

John William Butler (September 14, 1918 – April 23, 1963) was a professional football player in the National Football League (NFL). Butler played for four different NFL franchises during his four year career, finishing up in 1946 with the Bethlehem Bulldogs of the fledgling American Football League.

== Biography ==
=== Early life ===
Johnny Butler was born September 14, 1918, in Knoxville, Tennessee.

=== Collegiate career ===
Prior to playing professionally, Butler played football at the college level while attending the University of Tennessee from 1939 to 1941. As a sophomore in 1939, Butler ran 56 yards for a touchdown against the University of Alabama.

Butler's Tennessee team was extremely successful during his three years on the varsity, appearing in the 1939 Rose Bowl, 1940 Sugar Bowl, and 1941 Orange Bowl.

=== Professional career ===
Butler was drafted in the seventh round by the Pittsburgh Steelers in 1942. He would go on to play for both Steelers merged teams ("Steagles" in 1943; "Card-Pitt" in 1944).

In 1943 Butler was drafted into the military due to World War II, however he was physically disqualified for duty. He then made his first start with the "Steagles" one day after being ruled 4-F by his draft board for poor eyesight and bad knees.

During the 1944 season, Butler was fined $200 by co-coaches Walt Kiesling and Phil Handler for what they characterized as "indifferent play". He was then put on waivers and was soon claimed by the Brooklyn Tigers.

In 1945, he played his final season in the NFL with the Philadelphia Eagles.

In 1946 Butler signed to play with the Bethlehem Bulldogs of the American Football League, after Bulldogs owner Bob Sell purchased his contract from the Eagles for an undisclosed sum.

=== Death and legacy ===
John Butler died in April 1963 at the age of 44.

He was elected into the Tennessee Sports Hall of Fame in 1997.

== Sources ==
- Forr, James (2003). "Card-Pitt: The Carpits" (PDF). Coffin Corner. Vol. 25, no. 3. pp. 1–8. Archived from the original (PDF) on October 22, 2012 – via Professional Football Researchers Association.
- Steagles: When the Steelers and Eagles were One in the Same
- Tennessee Sports Hall of Fame
- Tennessee Football History
- John Butler's NFL profile
- Johnny Butler's obituary
