= George Smith (center) =

American football player (1914–1986)

No. 47
- Position: Center

Personal information
- Born: June 13, 1914; Los Angeles, California, U.S.
- Died: March 5, 1986 (aged 71); Walnut Creek, California, U.S.
- Listed height: 6 ft 2 in (1.88 m)
- Listed weight: 220 lb (100 kg)

Career information
- High school: Lincoln (Los Angeles)
- College: California

Career history
- Washington Redskins (1937, 1941–1943); Brooklyn Tigers (1944); Boston Yanks (1945); San Francisco 49ers (1947)

Awards and highlights
- 2× NFL champion (1937, 1942); 1942 Pro Bowl
- Stats at Pro Football Reference

George William Smith (June 13, 1914 – March 5, 1986) was an American football center in the National Football League (NFL) for the Washington Redskins, Brooklyn Tigers, and Boston Yanks. Smith also played in the All-America Football Conference (AAFC) for the San Francisco 49ers. He played college football at the University of California.
