= Joe Zeno =

American football player (1919–1992)

No. 27, 29, 33, 31
- Positions: Guard, Tackle

Personal information
- Born: June 14, 1919; Brooklyn, New York, U.S.
- Died: January 8, 1992 (aged 72); Glendale, California, U.S.
- Listed height: 5 ft 10 in (1.78 m)
- Listed weight: 234 lb (106 kg)

Career information
- High school: Waltham (Waltham, Massachusetts)
- College: Holy Cross (1938-1941)
- NFL draft: 1942: 5th round, 36th overall pick

Career history
- Washington Redskins (1942–1944); Boston Yanks (1946–1947)

Awards and highlights
- NFL champion (1942); Pro Bowl (1942)

Career NFL statistics
- Games played: 42
- Games started: 21
- Interceptions: 1
- Stats at Pro Football Reference

Joseph H. Zeno (June 14, 1919 – January 8, 1992) was an American professional football guard in the National Football League (NFL) for the Washington Redskins and the Boston Yanks.

== Early life ==
Zeno was born in Brooklyn, New York and played high school football at Waltham High School in Waltham, Massachusetts. He then went on to play college football at the College of the Holy Cross.

== Professional career ==
Zeno was selected in the fifth round of the 1942 NFL draft by the Washington Redskins, where he played until 1944. During his tenure with the Redskins, he was named to the Pro Bowl in 1942 and won the 1942 NFL Championship Game. Zeno then took time off to serve in the United States Army during World War II. He then played for two more seasons with the Boston Yanks.

== Coaching career ==
After retiring from the NFL, Zeno moved to California and became an assistant football coach at Arcadia High School for one season. He then was head coach of the Santa Paula High School football team for 15 years, retiring in 1974.

== Personal life ==
Many members of Zeno's family were also football players. His sons, Larry and Joe, and his twin grandsons, Lance and Eric, are former UCLA Bruins football players. Lance Zeno would eventually play in the NFL with the Cleveland Browns and Green Bay Packers. Zeno died from complications of Parkinson's disease on January 8, 1992, at a hospital in Glendale, California.
