= Bill Walls =

American football player and coach (1912–1993)

No. 24
- Position: End

Personal information
- Born: December 8, 1912; Lonoke, Arkansas, U.S.
- Died: January 3, 1993 (aged 80); Dallas, Texas, U.S.
- Listed height: 6 ft 4 in (1.93 m)
- Listed weight: 214 lb (97 kg)

Career information
- High school: North Little Rock (North Little Rock, Arkansas)
- College: TCU (1933–1936)
- NFL draft: 1937: undrafted

Career history

Playing
- New York Giants (1937–1939, 1941–1943)

Coaching
- Denton HS (TX) (1940) Head coach; Kilgore (1946) Assistant coach; Kilgore (1947–1948) Head coach; Corpus Christi (1949–1950) Head coach; Dallas Texans (1952) Ends coach; Pittsburgh Steelers (1962–1963) Assistant coach; LSU (1953–1954) Line coach; Colorado (1956–1958) Assistant coach; Florida State (1959) Assistant coach

Awards and highlights
- NFL champion (1938)

Career NFL statistics
- Receptions: 35
- Receiving yards: 596
- Receiving touchdowns: 4
- Stats at Pro Football Reference

Head coaching record
- Career: 19–2 (.905)

William Thomas Walls Jr. (December 8, 1912 – January 3, 1993) was an American professional football player and coach. He played professionally as an end for six seasons with the New York Giants of the National Football League (NFL). He attended North Little Rock High School in North Little Rock, Arkansas, and played college football at Texas Christian University (TCU).

Walls was the head football coach at Kilgore College in Kilgore, Texas from 1947 to 1948. He resigned in 1949 to become the head football coach at University of Corpus Christi—now known as Texas A&M University–Corpus Christi.

== Biography ==
Walls was born December 8, 1912, in Lonoke, Arkansas. He grew up in Little Rock.

Walls enrolled at Texas Christian University (TCU) in Fort Worth, Texas in 1933, playing football for the freshman team. In the spring of 1934 he attended spring practice in preparation to try out for the varsity squad, a team in its first year under new head coach Leo R. "Dutch" Meyer. Walls made the team as an end.

The 6'4" Walls also played basketball for the Horned frogs, starting for the team in 1934.

Walls was an undrafted free agent who made the squad with the New York Giants in 1937 and wound up playing six seasons for the team — 1937 to 1939 and 1941 to 1943.

Walls died January 3, 1993.

== Head coaching record ==
=== Junior college ===
Year	Team	Overall	Conference	Standing	Bowl/playoffs
Kilgore Rangers (Texas Junior College Football Federation) (1947–1948)
1947	Kilgore	9–1	6–1	2nd	
1948	Kilgore	10–1	6–1	1st	W Texas Rose Bowl
Kilgore:		19–2	12–2		
Total:		19–2			
National championship Conference title Conference division title or championship game berth
