= Bob Masterson =

American football player (1915–1994)

- Masterson in 1942

No. 28, 55
- Position: End

Personal information
- Born: July 23, 1915; North Branch, New Jersey, U.S.
- Died: June 29, 1994 (aged 78); Broward County, Florida, U.S.
- Listed height: 6 ft 1 in (1.85 m)
- Listed weight: 213 lb (97 kg)

Career information
- High school: Roselle (Roselle, New Jersey)
- College: Miami (FL) (1934-1937)
- NFL draft: 1938: 6th round, 50th overall pick

Career history
- Washington Redskins (1938–1943); Brooklyn Tigers (1944); Boston Yanks (1945); New York Yankees (1946)

Awards and highlights
- NFL champion (1942); First-team All-Pro (1942); Second-team All-Pro (1943); Pro Bowl (1942)

Career NFL/AAFC statistics
- Receptions: 136
- Receiving yards: 1,816
- Receiving touchdowns: 13
- Stats at Pro Football Reference

Robert Patrick Masterson (July 23, 1915 – June 29, 1994) was an American professional football end in the National Football League (NFL). He played six seasons for the Washington Redskins (1938–1943).

== Playing ==
Masterson was born in North Branch, New Jersey. He attended Roselle High School, where he was an all-state baseball player and also played basketball and track and field. He did not play football until his senior year. He was an all-state selection at tackle and helped RHS to an undefeated season and a state title. After a couple of seasons of semipro baseball, Masterson enrolled in the University of Miami, where he was converted from tackle to end by coach Irl Tubbs.

Masterson selected in the sixth round of the 1938 NFL draft by the Chicago Bears. He did not believe he was good enough to play professional football and did not sign with the Bears, who traded his rights to the Washington Redskins for a draft pick. Washington coach Ray Flaherty gave Masterson $300 to sign his contract, which he accepted to help his large family during the Great Depression. Masterson played for Washington from 1938 to 1943 and was a second team All-Pro selection in 1942 and 1943. He sought a raise in 1944, but owner George Preston Marshall refused. He was instead traded to the Brooklyn Tigers as part of a six-player swap. He did not receive the raise he sought, so in 1946, he jumped to the All-America Football Conference.

== Coaching ==
Masterson was a player-coach during his last two seasons in Washington and with the New York Yankees. In 1947, he was hired to coach University of Toronto's Varsity Blues football team. He was an assistant coach for one season to learn Canadian football, then took over as head coach the following year. In eight seasons, he compiled a 45-21-6 record and won the Yates Cup three times (1948, 1951, 1954). He was also the head men's basketball coach from 1947 to 1955 and amassed a 38–24 record.

== Executive ==
In 1956, Masterson was named general manager of the Canadian Football League's Calgary Stampeders. Following the Stampeders' October 26, 1957 game against Saskatchewan Roughriders, Masterson punched kick returner Harvey Wylie while the team was boarding its train back to Calgary. Masterson resigned four days later and was replaced by Jim Finks.

== Later life ==
After leaving Calgary, Masterson and his family settled in Clearwater, Florida. After his divorce, he moved to New York City and worked an assistant supervisor of Yankee Stadium. He eventually returned to Miami, where he was a mutual clerk at the Tropical Park Race Track and a part time teacher. He died on June 29, 1994 in Broward County, Florida.

== NFL career statistics ==
Legend
	Won the NFL Championship
**Bold**	Career high

=== Regular season ===
Year	Team	Games		Receiving			
Year	Team	GP	GS	Rec	Yds	Avg	TD
1938	WAS	11	1	10	213	**21.3**	1
1939	WAS	10	3	10	114	11.4	1
1940	WAS	11	1	18	283	15.7	**4**
1941	WAS	11	9	11	135	12.3	1
1942	WAS	11	11	22	**308**	14.0	2
1943	WAS	10	8	16	200	12.5	3
1944	BKN	10	9	**24**	258	10.8	1
1945	BOS	10	5	15	186	12.4	0
Career		84	47	126	1,697	13.5	13

=== Playoffs ===
Year	Team	Games		Receiving			
Year	Team	GP	GS	Rec	Yds	Avg	TD
1940	WAS	1	1	3	33	11.0	0
1942	WAS	1	1	1	8	8.0	0
1943	WAS	2	2	**6**	**86**	**14.3**	0
Career		4	4	10	127	12.7	0
