= Ken Hayden =

American football player (1917–1968)

No. 18
- Position: Center

Personal information
- Born: October 21, 1917; Hamburg, Arkansas
- Died: August 27, 1968 (age 50); Smackover, Arkansas, U.S.

Career information
- College: Arkansas

Career history
- 1942: Philadelphia Eagles
- 1943: Washington Redskins

Kenneth Mack Hayden (October 21, 1917 – August 27, 1968) was an American football offensive lineman in the National Football League for the Philadelphia Eagles and the Washington Redskins. He played college football at the University of Arkansas, before he served in World War II. He died in 1968, in Smackover, Arkansas, at age 50.
