= Jake Fawcett =

Australian cricketer (born 1990)

Personal information
- Full name: Jake David Fawcett
- Born: 22 March 1990 (age 36); Osborne Park, Western Australia
- Batting: Left-handed
- Bowling: Right-arm off-break
- Role: Batsman

Domestic team information
- Years: Team
- 2009/10: Western Australia
- LA debut: 24 October 2009 Western Australia v Queensland
- Last LA: 1 November 2009 Western Australia v New South Wales

Career statistics
Competition	List A
Matches	2
Runs scored	15
Batting average	7.5
100s/50s	0/0
Top score	15
Balls bowled	6
Wickets	0
Bowling average	–
5 wickets in innings	–
10 wickets in match	–
Best bowling	–
Catches/stumpings	0/–
- Source: CricketArchive, 11 February 2012

Jake David Fawcett (born 22 March 1990) is an Australian cricketer. He has played two List A cricket games for Western Australia. In the Ashes series against England he was a substitute fielder when Ryan Harris got Paul Collingwood on the last ball of the day. In 2012, he was a contestant on the reality television show Cricket Superstar.
