= Al Fiorentino =

American football player (1917–2001)

No. 11
- Position: Guard

Personal information
- Born: February 28, 1917; Watertown, New York, U.S.
- Died: January 25, 2001 (aged 83)

Career information
- College: Boston College

Career history
- 1943–1944: Washington Redskins
- 1945: Boston Yanks
- Stats at Pro Football Reference

Albert Michael Fiorentino (February 28, 1917 – January 28, 2001) was an American football guard in the National Football League for the Washington Redskins and the Boston Yanks. He played college football at Boston College.
