= George Sergienko =

American football player (1918–1993)

- George Sergienko, 1945

Profile
- Position: Tackle

Personal information
- Born: May 22, 1918; Chicopee, Massachusetts
- Died: December 4, 1993 (aged 75); Springfield, Massachusetts
- Listed height: 6 ft 1 in (1.85 m)
- Listed weight: 248 lb (112 kg)

Career information
- High school: Chicopee (MA)
- College: American International

Career history
- Bridgeport (1942); Brooklyn Dodgers (NFL) (1943); Brooklyn Tigers (1944); Boston Yanks (1945); Brooklyn Dodgers (AAFC) (1946); Baltimore Colts (1947)*
- * Offseason or practice squad member only
- Stats at Pro Football Reference

George Sergienko Jr. (May 22, 1918 – December 4, 1993) was an American football tackle. He played college football for American International College and professional football for the Brooklyn Dodgers (NFL) (1943), Brooklyn Tigers (1944), Boston Yanks (1945), and Brooklyn Dodgers (AAFC) (1946).

== Early life ==
Sergienko was born in Chicopee, Massachusetts in 1918 and attended Chicopee High School. He played college football at the tackle position for American International College (AIC) in 1937 and 1938.

== Professional football ==
After leaving AIC, Sergienko worked for three years at a Remington-Dupont plant in Bridgeport, Connecticut. He was ruled 4-F in the World War II draft due to a punctured ear drum. He also played semipro football for the Churchills of Holyoke in 1939 and 1940 and the Bridgeport club in 1942. He also played during this time period with football teams in Stratford and Wallingford, Connecticut.

In 1943, he tried out for the Brooklyn Dodgers of the National Football League at their training camp at Bear Mountain, New York, and was signed to a contract. He appeared in 10 games for the Dodgers during the 1943 season, nine of them as a starter, at the tackle and guard positions.

Sergienko continued to play for Brooklyn (renamed the Brooklyn Tigers) in 1944, appearing in 10 games at the tackle position. In 1944, the Brooklyn club was merged into the Boston Yanks in 1945, and Sergienko started all 10 games at tackle for the Yanks during the 1945 season.

In 1946, Sergienko concluded his professional football career with the Brooklyn Dodgers of the All-America Football Conference. He appeared in eight games for the Dodgers during the 1946 season. He signed a contract with the Baltimore Colts in 1947, but did not appear in any regular season games.

Over his four years in professional football, he appeared in a total of 37 or 38 NFL/AAFC football games, 24 or 25 of them as a starter.

== Family and later years ==
In 1947, Sergienko married Lucille C. Bouquet. He died in 1993 in Springfield, Massachusetts.
