= Tillie Manton =

American football player (1910–1991)

No. 14
- Position: Fullback

Personal information
- Born: August 24, 1910; Ryan, Oklahoma, U.S.
- Died: February 15, 1991 (aged 80); Houston, Texas, U.S.
- Listed height: 5 ft 11 in (1.80 m)
- Listed weight: 188 lb (85 kg)

Career information
- High school: Fort Worth (TX)
- College: Texas Christian

Career history
- New York Giants (1936–1938); Washington Redskins (1938); Brooklyn Dodgers (1943)

Awards and highlights
- NFL champion (1938)
- Stats at Pro Football Reference

Taldon Manton (August 24, 1910 – February 15, 1991) was an American football fullback in the National Football League (NFL) for the New York Giants, the Washington Redskins, and the Brooklyn Dodgers. He attended Louisiana State University and Texas Christian University.
