= Bill Davis (offensive lineman) =

American football player (1916–1994)

- Bill Davis, 1946

Profile
- Position: Tackle

Personal information
- Born: November 10, 1916; Grapevine, Texas, U.S.
- Died: November 8, 1994 (aged 77); Addison, Texas, U.S.
- Listed height: 6 ft 1 in (1.85 m)
- Listed weight: 234 lb (106 kg)

Career information
- High school: Grapevine (TX)
- College: Texas Tech
- NFL draft: 1940: 11th round, 91st overall pick

Career history
- Chicago Cardinals (1939–1941); Brooklyn Dodgers (1943); Miami Seahawks (1946)
- Stats at Pro Football Reference

William Dorris Davis (November 10, 1916 – November 8, 1994) was an American football tackle. He played college football for Texas Tech (1936–39) and professional football for the Chicago Cardinals (1940-1941), Brooklyn Dodgers (1943), and Miami Seahawks (1946).

== Early life ==
Davis was born in 1916 in Grapevine, Texas, and attended Grapevine High School. He played college football at the tackle position for Texas Tech from 1936 to 1939. He was selected as line captain of the 1939 Texas Tech Red Raiders football team.

== Professional football and military service ==
Davis was selected by the Chicago Cardinals with the 91st pick in the 1940 NFL draft. He appeared in 30 NFL games for the Cardinals (1940-1941) and Brooklyn Dodgers (1943). His career was interrupted by service in the Navy During World War II. He played for the 1942 Georgia Pre-Flight Skycrackers football team that compiled a 7–1–1 and was ranked No. 3 in the final AP Service Poll. Davis was named to the 1942 All-American service team. In 1946, he played for the Miami Seahawks of the All-America Football Conference (AAFC). He appeared in 12 games for the Seahawks.

== Later life ==
Davis lived in Richland Hills, Texas, for more than 40 years. He worked for Chance Vought and Sun Oil Co. He also served on the Richland Hills city council from 1968 to 1972. He died from cancer in 1994 in Addison, Texas.
