= Ray Wehba =

American football player (1916–2003)

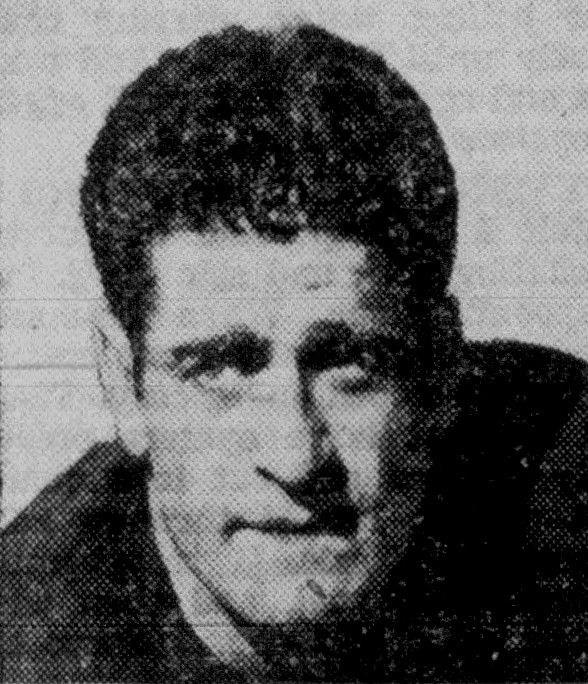
- Wehba, circa 1942

Profile
- Position: End

Personal information
- Born: August 16, 1916; Sherman, Texas, U.S.
- Died: June 2, 2003 (aged 86); Downey, California, U.S.
- Listed height: 6 ft 0 in (1.83 m)
- Listed weight: 215 lb (98 kg)

Career information
- High school: Oklahoma City (OK) Central
- College: USC

Career history
- Brooklyn Dodgers (1943); Green Bay Packers (1944)

Awards and highlights
- NFL champion (1944)

Career statistics
- Receptions: 10
- Receiving yards: 110
- Kick returns: 1
- Return yards: 15
- Stats at Pro Football Reference

Ray Wehba (August 16, 1916 – June 2, 2003) was a player in the National Football League (NFL). He first played with the Brooklyn Dodgers during the 1943 NFL season before playing with the Green Bay Packers during the 1944 NFL season.
