= Ken Heineman =

American football player (1918–2012)

No. 7, 10
- Positions: Defensive back, Tailback

Personal information
- Born: January 13, 1918; Yorktown, Texas, U.S.
- Died: July 10, 2012 (aged 94); Rogers, Arkansas, U.S.
- Listed height: 5 ft 9 in (1.75 m)
- Listed weight: 168 lb (76 kg)

Career information
- High school: El Paso (El Paso, Texas)
- College: UTEP (1935-1938)
- NFL draft: 1940: 6th round, 45th overall pick

Career history
- Cleveland Rams (1940); Brooklyn Dodgers (1943)

Career NFL statistics
- Rushing yards: 121
- Rushing average: 2.2
- Passing yards: 359
- TD-INT: 4-9
- Passer rating: 32.9
- Stats at Pro Football Reference

Kenneth Roy Heineman (January 13, 1918 – July 10, 2012) was an American professional football defensive back. He played for the Cleveland Rams in 1940 and for the Brooklyn Dodgers in 1943.

He died on July 10, 2012, in Rogers, Arkansas at age 94.
