= Joe Pasqua =

American football player (1918–1998)

No. 37
- Position: Offensive tackle

Personal information
- Born: July 31, 1918; Dallas, Texas, U.S.
- Died: December 10, 1998 (aged 80)

Career information
- College: Southern Methodist

Career history
- 1942: Cleveland Rams
- 1943: Washington Redskins
- 1946: Los Angeles Rams

Awards and highlights
- Second-team All-SWC (1940)

Joseph Bernard Pasqua (July 31, 1918 – December 10, 1998) was an American football offensive tackle in the National Football League (NFL) for the Cleveland Rams, Washington Redskins, and Los Angeles Rams. He attended Southern Methodist University.
