= Al Piasecky =

American football player (1917–1992)

No. 14
- Position: End

Personal information
- Born: February 1, 1917; Greensburg, Pennsylvania, U.S.
- Died: September 16, 1992 (aged 75); Deltona, Florida, U.S.

Career information
- High school: Jeannette (Jeannette, Pennsylvania)
- College: Duke

Career history
- Washington Redskins (1943–1945)

Awards and highlights
- Second-team All-SoCon (1941)
- Stats at Pro Football Reference

Alexander Piasecky (February 1, 1917 – September 16, 1992) was an American football end in the National Football League (NFL) for the Washington Redskins. He played college football at Duke University. He also played for the 1942 Georgia Pre-Flight Skycrackers football team. After World War II, he played for the Miami Seahawks of the All-America Football Conference (AAFC) but was cut at the end of August 1946. He then coached the Greensboro Patriots of the Dixie League.
