= Frank Sachse =

American basketball and football player (1917–1989)

Personal information
- Born: July 24, 1917 Memphis, Texas, U.S.
- Died: October 1, 1989 (aged 72) Dallas, Texas, U.S.
- Listed height: 6 ft 0 in (1.83 m)
- Listed weight: 195 lb (88 kg)

Career information
- High school: Quitaque (Quitaque, Texas)
- College: Texas Tech (1937–1938, 1942–1943)
- Position: Guard

Career history
- 1943–1945: Oshkosh All-Stars

Career highlights
- First-team all-Border (1938)

Francis Marion "Butch" Sachse Jr. (July 24, 1917 – October 1, 1989) was an American professional basketball and football player. He played collegiately at Texas Tech University.

== Professional careers ==
=== Football ===
Sachse's professional football career spanned three National Football League seasons. He played for the Brooklyn Dodgers (1943), Brooklyn Tigers (1944), and the Boston Yanks (1945). In 20 career games, he completed 32 of 75 pass attempts to go with three touchdowns and six interceptions.

=== Basketball ===
Sachse's basketball career was two seasons spent playing in the National Basketball League for the Oshkosh All-Stars. A guard, he averaged 4.5 points per game spanning the 1943–44 and 1944–45 seasons.
