= Wilbur Moore =

American football player (1916–1965)

No. 35
- Positions: Halfback, wingback, defensive back

Personal information
- Born: April 22, 1916; Austin, Minnesota, U.S.
- Died: August 9, 1965 (aged 49); Takoma Park, Maryland, U.S.
- Listed height: 5 ft 11 in (1.80 m)
- Listed weight: 187 lb (85 kg)

Career information
- High school: Austin
- College: Minnesota (1935-1938)
- NFL draft: 1939: 9th round, 78th overall pick

Career history

Playing
- Washington Redskins (1939–1946)

Coaching
- Washington Redskins (1947–1950) Backfield coach

Awards and highlights
- NFL champion (1942); Pro Bowl (1942); National champion (1936); First-team All-Big Ten (1938)

Career NFL statistics
- Rushing yards: 901
- Rushing average: 4.9
- Receptions: 91
- Receiving yards: 1,224
- Total touchdowns: 24
- Stats at Pro Football Reference

Wilbur John Moore (April 22, 1916 – August 9, 1965) was an American professional football running back in the National Football League (NFL) for the Washington Redskins. He played college football for the Minnesota Golden Gophers and was drafted 78th overall by the Redskins in the ninth round of the 1939 NFL draft.

== Biography ==
Moore (left) with Washington Redskins teammates Sammy Baugh (center) and Dick Todd (right) in 1943

Wilbur Moore was born April 22, 1916, in Austin, Minnesota.

He attended the University of Minnesota, where he was part of the 1936 Golden Gophers football team that won a national championship.

On August 9, 1965, Moore was shot to death in front of his wife's home in Mitchellville, Maryland. He and Clara Moore had been separated for three months, and had been seen arguing before she killed him with a single shot from a .22 caliber revolver.
