= 1942 NFL Championship Game =

Coordinates: 38.9175°N 77.020°W

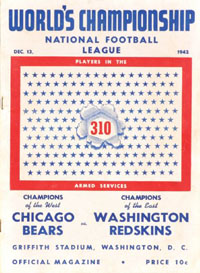
Chicago Bears (Western) (11–0)	Washington Redskins (Eastern) (10–1)
6	14
Head coach: George Halas Hunk Anderson Luke Johnsos	Head coach: Ray Flaherty
	1	2	3	4	Total
CHI	0	6	0	0	6
WAS	0	7	7	0	14
- Date: December 13, 1942
- Stadium: Griffith Stadium; Washington, D.C.
- Favorite: Chicago
- Attendance: 36,006

Radio in the United States
- Network: Mutual
- Announcers: Harry Wismer, Russ Hodges, Jack Drees

Location in the United States

The 1942 NFL Championship Game was the tenth title game of the National Football League (NFL), played at Griffith Stadium in Washington, D.C., on December 13, with a sellout capacity attendance of 36,006.

It matched the undefeated Western Division champion Chicago Bears (11–0) and the Eastern Division champion Washington Redskins (10–1). The Bears were co-coached by Hunk Anderson and Luke Johnsos (after George Halas had entered the U.S. Navy) and led on the field by quarterback Sid Luckman. The Redskins were led by head coach Ray Flaherty and quarterback Sammy Baugh. The Redskins defeated the Bears in a low-scoring contest, 14–6, to win their second championship in team history. This was the last major professional sports championship won by a Washington, D.C.-based team until the then-Washington Bullets won the NBA championship in 1978, and the last championship won by the Redskins until Super Bowl XVII in 1983.

== Background ==
Chicago had won easily in the summer exhibition game with Washington, but the teams had not met during the 1942 regular season. The Bears were aiming for their third consecutive league title and were favored by three touchdowns, but were upset 14–6 by the home underdog Redskins.

Tickets were sold out three weeks in advance, and some were being resold for up to fifty dollars.

This was the second and final NFL title game played at Griffith Stadium and in the city of Washington. The two teams met on the same site two years earlier with a very different result, as the visiting Bears won in a 73–0 rout.

== Scoring summary ==
Washington Redskins 14, Chicago Bears 6

Quarter	1	2	3	4	Total
Bears	0	6	0	0	6
Redskins	0	7	7	0	14

at Griffith Stadium, Washington, D.C.

- Date: December 13, 1942
- Game time: 2 p.m. EWT (EDT)
- Pro-Football-Reference.com

Game information
- First quarter
  - no scoring
- Second quarter
  - CHI – Lee Artoe 52-yard fumble return (kick failed). Bears 6–0
  - WAS – Wilbur Moore 39-yard pass from Sammy Baugh (Bob Masterson kick). Redskins 7–6
- Third quarter
  - WAS – Andy Farkas 1-yard run (Masterson kick). Redskins 14–6
- Fourth quarter
  - no scoring

== Officials ==
- Referee: Ronald Gibbs
- Umpire: Carl Brubaker
- Head linesman: Charlie Berry
- Field judge: Chuck Sweeney

The NFL had only four game officials in 1942; the back judge was added in 1947, the line judge in 1965, and the side judge in 1978.

== Players' shares ==
The gate receipts from the sellout were over $113,000, a record, and each Redskin player received about $976 while each Bear saw about $639.

== Next year ==
At the time, an owners' winter meeting and the annual draft of college players was held around the title game. A year into World War II for the United States and with much of the talent in or entering the military, the meeting focused on whether or not to operate the league in 1943; the decision was to continue, with the 1943 NFL draft postponed until April.
