= 1943 Chicago Bears season =

NFL team season

- Owner: George S. Halas
- General manager: Ralph Brizzolara (Business Manager)
- Head coach: Hunk Anderson; Luke Johnsos
- Home stadium: Wrigley Field

Results
- Record: 8–1–1
- Division place: 1st NFL Western
- Playoffs: Won NFL Championship (vs. Redskins) 41–21

The 1943 season was the Chicago Bears' 24th in the National Football League. The team failed to match on their 11–0 record from 1942 and finished at 8–1–1, under temporary co-coaches Hunk Anderson and Luke Johnsos.

On the way to winning the Western Division, the Bears were, yet again, denied a chance at an undefeated season by the defending champion Redskins in Washington. The Bears had their revenge in the NFL title game and defeated the Redskins at Wrigley Field to claim their sixth league title. It was their third championship in four years, establishing themselves as the pro football dynasty of the early 1940s.

== Offseason ==
=== Attempted merger with the Cardinals ===
When the United States entered World War II, over 1,000 NFL personnel joined the military, including 350 players and 45 active Bears, the latter featuring over half of the 1942 team. Chicago also lost head coach George Halas to the United States Navy during the 1942 season, which forced assistant coaches Hunk Anderson and Luke Johnsos to take over as co-head coaches. Minority owner Ralph Brizzolara, a friend of Halas', became the interim president and general manager. A shortage of players occurred as teams attempted to salvage their rosters; the Cleveland Rams were eventually forced to shut down for the 1943 season as both of their owners were serving. NFL owners considered going on hiatus for 1943, but elected to reduce roster sizes to 25 from 33, along with allowing free substitution throughout games.

Halas returned to Chicago for the annual owners' meeting on June 19, where the Philadelphia Eagles and Pittsburgh Steelers requested to merge operations for the upcoming season. Halas and Chicago Cardinals owner Charley Bidwill also did the same; the two owners were close friends, with Bidwill owning a share in the Bears and serving as team secretary before purchasing the Cardinals. A group of four owners, led by George Preston Marshall of the Washington Redskins, opposed the two mergers, which they felt gave the merging teams "an easy out" compared to assembling their rosters on their own like the other teams.

The four lobbied for a rule in which one merging team must disperse its players to the other teams in the league, which would have rendered the mergers pointless, though it was passed 5–2 (Philadelphia's Harry Thayer and Pittsburgh's Art Rooney voted against, while Halas and Bidwill abstained). Thayer and Rooney pleaded for the Chicago owners to withdraw their merger proposal, hoping it would increase the chances of the Pennsylvania teams' request succeeding. Halas and Bidwill agreed, while the Eagles/Steelers merger was approved and became the Steagles.

Now on their own, the Bears rebuilt their roster by acquiring players from the shuttered Rams, including running back Dante Magnani and end Jim Benton. After his signing, Magnani commented, "I now get to play with the Bears instead of against them. I don't get beat up anymore."

=== War Manpower Commission investigation ===
In September, the Bears wrote a press statement about five players — Magnani, ends Hampton Pool and Al Hoptowit, center Bulldog Turner, and running back Harry Clark – who left their offseason jobs at war plants to join the team for the upcoming season. The release drew the suspicion of the War Manpower Commission (WMC), which launched an investigation into the Bears, who, the commission felt, were a secondary employer to the military. WMC regional director William H. Spencer ordered the players to provide certificates of availability; should they fail to give such documents, they would either have to return to the factories or be automatically placed into the Selective Service System (military draft; 1–A).

Brizzolara defended the team, while NFL Commissioner Elmer Layden cooperated with the WMC and proclaimed the war comes first". While some teams like the Steagles required all players to maintain wartime jobs in addition to playing, a ruling against the Bears would have affected professional sports as a whole. New York Herald Tribune writer Arthur E. Patterson warned a similar situation in Major League Baseball would have ended the league for the 1944 season if players were "frozen to their war jobs".

On September 23, three days before the season opener, Brizzolara met with Spencer, who also visited Layden a day later. Spencer eventually agreed the five players would be allowed to play for the Bears, who also announced four other players – running backs Bill Geyer and Bill Osmanski, tackle Bill Steinkemper, and defensive end John Siegal – would be enlisting in the Navy.

=== Return of Bronko Nagurski ===
After losing to the Redskins in the 1942 NFL Championship Game, Halas sought revenge against Marshall for the game. While stationed on a ship in Milne Bay near New Guinea, Halas considering bringing fullback Bronko Nagurski, who retired after the 1937 season to enter professional wrestling after Halas refused to increase his pay, out of retirement. Three months before the start of the 1943, he submitted a telegram to Anderson: "SIGN NAGURSKI AND PAY FIVE GRAND. STOP.", which was retrieved by Naval decoders who assumed Nagurski was a Japanese spy before forwarding it to Anderson.

Nagurski was contacted by Anderson and was offered the money suggested by Halas. He was initially reluctant due to injuries sustained over his career, but the Great Depression resulted in poor prize money and corruption plaguing the wrestling world, while returning to the Bears would him with an opportunity to support his family. Anderson proposed if Nagurski was unable to consistently run, he could play offensive tackle (a position he played at Minnesota in college); additionally, the new free substitution rules implemented for the 1943 season would allow Nagurski to play until he could stop.

During Training Camp, Nagurski injured many of his teammates with his physical style of play. In one incident, friend and offensive lineman George Musso refused to block Nagurski, prompting Anderson to do so in his place; although he was 45 years old, Anderson hoped to prove he was still tough to his players. Instead, Nagurski collided with Anderson's breastbone and knocked him out, forcing trainer Andy Lotshaw to assist the coach with smelling salts. Upon recovering, Anderson yelled, "Tell that son of a bitch that I can still whip his ass. But not today."

=== Sid Luckman ===
Bears quarterback Sid Luckman had one of the greatest seasons for a quarterback in NFL history, and certainly the greatest passing season in the history of the early NFL. "Luckman was essentially the player who first fulfilled the position of quarterback as we know it today: the player expected to handle every snap and attempt almost every pass," says Cold Hard Football Facts. "He was also the first to put up modern-looking numbers. When you consider Luckman's numbers in 1943, consider that the league-wide passer rating that year was a meager 48.5. Hell, his 28 TDs, 12 INTs and 107.5 passer rating would be downright impressive in today's game, let alone back in the virtual Stone Age of the NFL. His 10.9 yards-per-attempt, meanwhile, is simply mind blowing in any era. The Bears scored 30.3 points-per-game in 1943. Again, great in any era."

=== NFL draft ===
1943 Chicago Bears draft
Round	Pick	Player	Position	College	Notes
1	9	Bob Steuber	Halfback	DePauw	
3	24	Fred Evans	Halfback	Notre Dame	
5	39	Ed Stamm	Tackle	Stanford	
6	49	Derrell Palmer	Defensive tackle	TCU	
7	59	Milt Vucinich	Center	Stanford	
8	69	Alyn Beals	End	Santa Clara	
9	79	Jim Jurkovich	Back	California	
10	89	Walt Lamb	End	Oklahoma	
11	99	Ray (Duke) Hammett	Back	Stanford	
12	109	Al Zikmund	Back	Nebraska	
13	119	Clark Wood	Tackle	Kentucky	
14	129	Loyd Arms	Guard	Oklahoma A&M	
15	139	Lyle Sturdy	Back	Wichita	
16	149	Buddy Tomlinson	Tackle	Hardin–Simmons	
17	159	Pat Preston	Guard	Duke	
18	169	Hank Norberg	End	Stanford	
19	179	Pat Lyons	End	Wisconsin	
20	189	Marion Butler	Back	Clemson	
21	199	Al Santucci	Center	Santa Clara	
22	209	Bill Johnson	Guard	SMU	
23	219	Wally Boudreau	Back	Boston College	
24	229	Bob Baumann	Tackle	Wisconsin	
25	239	Elwood Holtscher	Center	Shurtleff	
26	249	Ben Keller	Guard	Duquesne	
27	259	Charley Block	End	Shurtleff	
28	269	Ted Brannon	Tackle	Rice	
29	279	Lou Wayne	End	Texas	
30	289	Dick Creevy	Back	Notre Dame	
31	294	Bill Buffington	Back	Purdue	
32	299	Woody Peterson	Back	Utah	
Made roster

== Schedule ==
Game	Date	Opponent	Result	Record	Venue	Attendance	Recap	Sources
1	September 26	at **Green Bay Packers**	**T** 21–21	0–0–1	City Stadium	23,675	Recap	
2	October 3	at **Detroit Lions**	**W** 27–21	1–0–1	Briggs Stadium	48,118	Recap	
3	October 10	**Chicago Cardinals**	**W** 20–0	2–0–1	Wrigley Field	24,658	Recap	
4	October 17	Steagles	**W** 48–21	3–0–1	Wrigley Field	21,744	Recap	
5	October 24	Brooklyn Dodgers	**W** 33–21	4–0–1	Wrigley Field	9,600	Recap	
6	October 31	**Detroit Lions**	**W** 35–14	5–0–1	Wrigley Field	25,187	Recap	
7	November 7	**Green Bay Packers**	**W** 21–7	6–0–1	Wrigley Field	43,425	Recap	
8	November 14	at New York Giants	**W** 56–7	7–0–1	Polo Grounds	56,681	Recap	
9	November 21	at Washington Redskins	**L** 7–21	7–1–1	Griffith Stadium	35,672	Recap	
10	November 28	at **Chicago Cardinals**	**W** 35–24	8–1–1	Comiskey Park	17,219	Recap	
Note: Intra-division opponents are in **bold** text.

== Standings ==
NFL Western Division
	W	L	T	PCT	DIV	PF	PA	STK
Chicago Bears	8	1	1	.889	5–0–1	303	157	W1
Green Bay Packers	7	2	1	.778	4–1–1	264	172	W3
Detroit Lions	3	6	1	.333	2–4	178	218	L2
Chicago Cardinals	0	10	0	.000	0–6	95	238	L10

Note: Tie games were not officially counted in the standings until 1972.

== Playoffs ==
Round	Date	Opponent	Result	Record	Venue	Attendance	Recap	Sources
Championship	December 26	Washington Redskins	W 41–21	1–0	Wrigley Field	34,320	Recap	

== Roster ==
Official team photo of the 1943 Chicago Bears. Top Row: Goldie, Barbartsky, Nagurski, Musso, Snyder, Poole, Famiglietti, Benton, Berry, Ippolito, Halas. Middle Row: Driscoll, Anderson, Magnani, Luckman, McEnulty, Hoptowit, Turner, Fortmann, Matuza, Clark, Johnsos, Brizzolara. Front Row: Sigillo, Vodicka, McLean, Wilson, Nolting, Steinkemper, Mundee, Logan, Masterson.

1943 Chicago Bears final roster
Quarterbacks: 42 Sid Luckman S/P; 13 Bob Snyder S/K/P; Backs: 4 Harry Clarke RB/CB; 2 Gary Famiglietti FB/LB; 8 Dante Magnani RB/CB; 57 Ray McLean RB/CB; 29 Doug McEnulty FB/LB; 3 Bronko Nagurski FB/LB; 25 Ray Nolting RB/CB; 48 Joe Vodicka RB/CB	Linemen/Linebackers: 46 Al Babartsky T/DT; 37 Bernie Digris T/DT/G/DG; 21 Dan Fortmann G/DG; 17 Pete Gudauskas G/DG; 26 Al Hoptowit T/DT; 82 Tony Ippolito G/DG; 20 Jim Logan G/DG; 15 Al Matuza C/LB; 36 Fred Mundee C/LB; 16 George Musso G/T/DG; 19 Dom Sigillo T/DT; 35 Bill Steinkemper T/DT; 66 Bulldog Turner C/LB	Ends/Receivers: 12 Jim Benton; 23 Connie Mack Berry; 76 Hamp Pool; 30 George Wilson; Reserve: 7 Bill Geyer RB/CB (Military); 9 Bill Osmanski FB/LB (Military); - Bill Rogers T/DT (inactive); 6 John Siegal E (Military); Rookies in italics

== See also ==
- 1943 NFL Championship Game
