= 1944 Chicago Bears season =

NFL team season

- Owner: George Halas
- Head coach: Hunk Anderson; Luke Johnsos
- Home stadium: Wrigley Field

Results
- Record: 6–3–1
- Division place: T-2nd NFL Western
- Playoffs: Did not qualify

The 1944 season was the Chicago Bears' 25th in the National Football League. The team was co-coached by Hunk Anderson and Luke Johnsos with Paddy Driscoll as the assistant coach.

They placed second in the Western Division with a record of 6–3–1, which was tied with the Detroit Lions and trailed the Green Bay Packers. The Bears totaled the second highest tally of points scored and the sixth fewest points conceded.

The Bears were unable to reach the postseason for the first time since 1939 and were unsuccessful in claiming their fourth title of the 1940s. Playing from their home stadium of Wrigley Field, the Bears had to deal with many players leaving the league to serve in World War II.

== 1944 All-Star Game ==
The 1944 Chicago College All-Star Game between the Bears and All-Stars was presented in a similar method to the 1943 game. The selection of coaches and players for the College All-Star team was based on the classic games of the previous years and was not dictated by votes from supporters. At the beginning of August, the coach of the collegiate team was revealed to be Lynn Waldorf from Northwestern. His assistants were Jeff Cravath, Bo McMillin, Wes Fry and Henry Frinka. These coaches were responsible for the largest-ever College All-Star squad of 71 individuals. Many of their players were on furlough from their military service and were therefore in prime fitness. On August 30, this collegiate team would play the Chicago Bears at Northwestern University's Dyche Stadium.

In the build-up to the match, the All-Stars trained at Dyche Stadium while the Bears trained at Collegeville, Indiana. On August 22, the Bears "received a big boost when star quarterback Sid Luckman was able to report to training camp". Luckman had been permitted to return from Sheepshead Bay where he was involved in Maritime Service to participate in the All-Star match. This resulted in the Bears being tipped favorites as a 9–5 in the betting line with the addition of the quarterback. However, the Bears were missing key players of Danny Fortmann, Lee Artoe and Hampton Pool. The match sold out with approximately 50,000 people in attendance that mainly featured fans from Chicago due to travel restrictions in wartime. Broadcasting was nation-wide through the WGN (AM) and Mutual radio networks. The Chicago Bears just managed to win the 1944 All-Star match and Francis J. Powers stated in the Chicago Daily News that it was “Not the crushing Bears of other years, but still the Bears, the National Football League Champions”.

== Draftees ==
1944 Chicago Bears draft
Round	Pick	Player	Position	College	Notes
1	9	Ray Evans	Tailback	Kansas	
3	24	Rudy Smeja	End	Michigan	
5	40	Abe Croft	End	SMU	
6	51	Clair B. Stanley	Tackle	Tulsa	
7	62	Darwin Steeley	Center	Stanford	
8	73	Randall Fawcett	Back	Stanford	
9	84	Jack Morton	End	Purdue	
10	95	Bill Starford	Center	Wake Forest	
11	106	Lin Houston	Guard	Ohio State	
12	117	J. P. Moore	Back	Vanderbilt	
13	128	Bill Duffey	End	Georgetown	
14	139	Joe Hartley	Tackle	LSU	
15	150	Bill Milner	Linebacker	Duke	
16	161	Buckets Hirsch	Quarterback	Northwestern	
17	172	Ed Ryckeley	End	Georgia Tech	
18	183	Howdy Plasman	Back	Miami	
19	194	Barry French	Guard	Purdue	
20	205	Paul Taylor	Back	USC	
21	216	Bob Margarita	Halfback	Brown	
22	227	Ed Davis	Back	Oklahoma	
23	238	Dick Jamison	Tackle	USC	
24	249	Jack Bortka	Back	Kansas State	
25	260	Roy Ruskusky	End	St Mary's	
26	271	Harry Franck	Back	Northwestern	
27	282	Jack McKewan	Tackle	Alabama	
28	194	Charlie Mitchell	Halfback	Tulsa	
29	304	Pat Boyle	Guard	Wisconsin	
30	315	Bernie Pepper	Tackle	Missouri	
31	321	Karl Vogt	Tackle	Villanova	
32	327	Bob Endres	Tackle	Colgate	
Made roster † Pro Football Hall of Fame * Made at least one Pro Bowl during career

== Impact of World War II ==
The Bears had 45 individuals leave the club to serve in the United States Armed Forces during World War II. Owner and coach George Halas left his role as Bears coach at the end of the 1942 campaign to join the Navy. At the time of the 1944 season, he operated in the Pacific Ocean where he later received a Bronze Star. The official program of the Bears–Pittsburgh Steelers on December 3 praised how despite Halas' departure, the team was still impressive as "[t]hey have helped the paid-to-play game reach the popular height it now attains, thanks to the astuteness, showmanship and business ability of George Halas". Ed McCaskey, Halas' son-in-law and longtime Chicago Bears executive, also achieved a Bronze Star when fighting in the Army. In Halas' place, Luke Johnsos and Hunk Anderson served as co-head coaches.

Following the 1943 season, Hall of Fame quarterback Sid Luckman volunteered for military service in the United States Merchant Marine. As he remained in the United States for his service in 1944, he was allowed to be involved in Bears' games on weekends. Luckman was responsible for transporting gasoline in a tanker to Europe, as well as transferring soldiers from Britain to France at the time of the invasion of Normandy in June. That season, he was only able to return and participate in seven games. Notably that season, Luckman was able to provide an 86-yard pass to Ray McLean for a touchdown against the Boston Yanks. The Steelers game featured a tribute to those serving.

Another two Bears Hall of Famers, Joe Stydahar and Dan Fortmann served in the United States Navy during the season. Fortmann then finished his residency and became the team physician for the Los Angeles Rams until 1963.

== Regular season ==
The 1944 season was the third full competition that coincided with World War II. The rosters of many teams were becoming depleted after players were drafted or volunteered for service. The Bears–Steelers game program read, "The big, bad Chicago Bears may not be as ferocious this year as they have been in the past, but if a popularity contest were to be held by pro football followers throughout the country, they would still vote the Bears the most appealing team."

The Bears were unable to replicate their winning season of the previous year in 1943. After losing 19 out of the 28 players from the previous year to leave and serve in the war, the Bears had difficulty recruiting. One of the Bears' co-coaches, Luke Johnsos, stated that the club "signed up anybody who could run around the field twice." In spite of this, the Steelers game's program also praised the ability of the Chicago team, highlighting that "[t]he Bears still can flash the old time power as witness their thundering 28 to 7 upset over the high-flying Philadelphia Eagles only last Sunday when the Eagles were made the favorites. The Bears on their best day, weak or not, can whip any football team in the country. Records go to prove this. Beyond that they are colorful and crowd appealing."

=== Schedule ===
Game	Date	Opponent	Result	Record	Venue	Attendance	Recap	Sources
1	September 24	at Green Bay Packers	**L** 28–42	0–1	City Stadium	24,362	Recap	
—	Bye							
2	October 8	at **Cleveland Rams**	**L** 19–7	0–2	League Park	15,750	Recap	
3	October 15	**Card-Pitt**	**W** 34–7	1–2	Wrigley Field	29,940	Recap	
4	October 22	**Detroit Lions**	**T** 21–21	1–2–1	Wrigley Field	23,835	Recap	
5	October 29	**Cleveland Rams**	**W** 28–21	2–2–1	Wrigley Field	23,644	Recap	
6	November 5	Green Bay Packers	**W** 21–0	3–2–1	Wrigley Field	45,553	Recap	
7	November 12	Boston Yanks	**W** 21–7	4–2–1	Wrigley Field	19,374	Recap	
8	November 19	at Detroit Lions	**L** 41–21	4–3–1	Briggs Stadium	21,960	Recap	
9	November 26	at Philadelphia Eagles	**W** 28–7	5–3–1	Shibe Park	34,035	Recap	
10	December 3	at **Card-Pitt**	**W** 49–7	6–3–1	Forbes Field	9,069	Recap	
Note: Intra-division opponents are in **bold** text.

=== Standings ===
NFL Western Division
	W	L	T	PCT	DIV	PF	PA	STK
Green Bay Packers	8	2	0	.800	7–1	238	141	W1
Chicago Bears	6	3	1	.667	4–3–1	258	172	W2
Detroit Lions	6	3	1	.667	4–3–1	216	151	W4
Cleveland Rams	4	6	0	.400	4–4	188	224	L2
Card-Pitt	0	10	0	.000	0–8	108	328	L10

Note: Tie games were not officially counted in the standings until 1972.

=== Season statistics ===
The Bears tallied a total of 258 points scored, the second most in the league. The rushing and passing offenses were each ranked second, while the team recorded the third best kicking and punting statistics.

On defense, the Bears conceded 172 points across the season and ranked sixth in the league for their defensive statistics.

The team were able to achieve 3,167 yards in the season and concede 2006 yards against them. They ranked first in the league for the number of yards in offense and second for the number of yards in defense.

== Roster ==
1944 Chicago Bears final roster
Quarterbacks: 8 Bill Glenn S; 33 Johnny Long RB/S; 42 Sid Luckman P/S; 6 Gene Ronzani S; Ends/Receivers: 23 Connie Mack Berry; 12 Abe Croft; 76 Elmo Kelly; 51 Rudy Smeja; 30 George Wilson	Linemen/Linebackers: 46 Al Babartsky T/DT; 17 Pete Gudauskas G/DG/K; 26 Al Hoptowit T/DT; 20 Fred Mundee C/LB; 16 George Musso G/DG; 82 Tom Roberts T/DT; 19 Dom Sigillo T/DT; 7 Ed Sprinkle G/DG; 13 Jake Sweeney T/DT; 66 Bulldog Turner C/LB; 14 George Zorich G/DG	Backs: 2 Gary Famiglietti FB/LB; 3 Jim Fordham FB/LB; 32 Al Grygo RB/CB; 44 Bob Margarita RB/CB; 37 Bob Masters FB/LB; 29 Doug McEnulty RB/CB/P; 57 Ray McLean RB/CB; 4 Tipp Mooney RB/CB; Reserve: 25 Ray Nolting RB/CB (IR); Rookies in italics
