= Wichita Aero Commandos =

American football team

General information
- Founded: 1942
- Folded: 1942
- Stadium: Lawrence Stadium
- Headquartered: Wichita, Kansas

Personnel
- Owner: John MacCullough
- Head coach: Frank Bausch

The Wichita Aero Commandos were an American football team that played in 1942. Located in Wichita, Kansas, the team's players consisted of employees from the Aero Parts Manufacturing Company. Many of the team's opponents were from military installations that were established during World War II, though they also played two games against National Football League franchises.

The team maintained a partnership with the Chicago Bears that turned the Commandos into a de facto farm team. Former Bears player Frank Bausch served as head coach.

== Formation ==
In 1942, with the United States fighting in World War II, President Franklin D. Roosevelt urged sports programs to continue operating. John MacCullough, a former USC Trojans football player and the owner of Aero Parts Manufacturing Company, was inspired by Roosevelt's words and formed a team consisting of his employees. In announcing the team's founding on August 2, MacCullough explained, "We feel that inasmuch as Wichita is an outstanding defense city it is important that the workers be provided with clean, wholesome sports recreation. We are hopeful that our sponsoring of the professional football team will accomplish that purpose."

To lead the team, MacCullough appointed Aero Parts assistant chief of police Frank Bausch as head coach. A Wichita native, Bausch was an All-Pro center for the Chicago Bears during his NFL career in the 1930s, and was an assistant line coach with the Philadelphia Eagles in 1941. The hiring was endorsed by Bears coach George Halas. In a phone call with MacCullough on August 8, Halas agreed to provide the Wichita team with developing players from the Bears; Halas cited Bausch's presence as a key factor in making the deal as the Bears and Bausch both used the T formation offense. Bears assistant Gene Ronzani joined the team as a player-coach. Other staffers included E. E. "Dutch" Scheufler as athletic trainer; Scheufler previously worked in the same position for the National Baseball Congress and the Henry's Amateur Athletic Union basketball team.

When assembling a roster, Bausch emphasized that although many college students were being hired at war plants, he would not recruit players who were still eligible to play college football. Among the team's signings were former Kansas quarterback and Aero Parts personnel department employee Ralph Miller, Miller's high school teammate and running back Burt "Red" Hayes, Wichita University fullback and punter Doug McEnulty, and Tennessee fullback Chet Robertson who lost a finger in an accident at a Boeing plant later in August.

On September 5, the team was formally dubbed the Wichita Aero Commandos. Some official NFL records refer to the team as the Aero Commanders like the Arizona Cardinals' media guide.

== Schedule ==
The Aero Commandos played eight games, six of which were against military teams. The final two games came against the NFL's Chicago Cardinals and Cleveland Rams, both of whom had bye weeks and scheduled the games as additional preparation. Wichita's season was initially supposed to begin against Lowry Field, but a military order prevented them from playing teams outside the base. Waco Army Air Field, the original Week 3 opponent, canceled after a string of blowout losses.

Lawrence Stadium hosted every game. Although primarily a baseball park, it was completely resodded for football and bleachers were constructed. The seating capacity was also increased to 12,500. Season tickets were not sold to avoid clashing with Wichita University's own sales, though fans were able to reserve single-game tickets for the entire season. The team held preseason practices at Friends University.

Date	Time	Opponent	Site	Result	Attendance	Source
October 4	2:30 pm	Camp Gruber	Lawrence Stadium; Wichita, KS	W 26–0	4,000	
October 11	2:30 pm	Colorado Springs Air Base	Lawrence Stadium; Wichita, KS	W 40–7	3,000	
October 18	3:00 pm	Albuquerque Air Base	Lawrence Stadium; Wichita, KS	W 14–3	2,000	
October 25	2:30 pm	Randolph Field	Lawrence Stadium; Wichita, KS	W 55–0	1,500	
November 1	2:30 pm	Fort Riley	Lawrence Stadium; Wichita, KS	L 0–10		
November 8	2:30 pm	Fort Sill	Lawrence Stadium; Wichita, KS	W 28–0	500	
November 15	2:30 pm	Chicago Cardinals	Lawrence Stadium; Wichita, KS	L 7–35	5,000	
November 22	1:30 pm	Cleveland Rams	Lawrence Stadium; Wichita, KS	L 7–14		

== Game summaries ==
=== Week 1: vs. Camp Gruber ===
The Aero Commandos' inaugural game came against Camp Gruber, a United States Army team from Oklahoma that won the branch's football championship in 1941. Miller was named the starting quarterback with Ronzani as his backup, while Bausch started at center.

One minute into the game, Hayes intercepted a pass on his team's 30-yard line to set up a 70-yard scoring drive in which Miller threw to Triplett, who made a lateral pass to Hayes and ran for the touchdown. In the second quarter, "Tip" Mooney ran for 12 yards to Gruber's 23-yard line, where he completed a 20-yard pass to Elmo Kelly and Paul Graham ran in for another score. Ronzani led another series that ended in a score via Floyd "Snoz" Wheeler. McEnulty recorded the final touchdown on a five-yard run. Down 26–0, Gruber attempted to throw the ball but only completed three of 11 passes for 38 total yards.

Wichita recorded 256 total yards while Gruber had just 40. The Aero Commandos also outgained their opponent in first downs with 18 to Gruber's four.

=== Week 2: vs. Colorado Springs Air Base ===
Army Air Base, Colorado Springs, a team that was regarded as having "a reputation for wide open football" with the single-wing formation, visited Wichita for the Commandos' second game. The lone change to the starting lineup came at right end where Bob Layton was named the starter over Triplett. Before the game, the Aero Commandos signed West Texas alumnus Teeter Schupach and Washington State's Sam Godfey.

The Commandos scored 27 unanswered points in the first half beginning with Miller's first quarter touchdown pass to Hayes. A quarter later, Chief McClain scored twice on 13- and 17-yard runs, followed by Ronzani's eight-yard touchdown throw to George Gruber shortly before halftime. Another touchdown came in the third quarter to put Wichita up 33–0. Colorado finally scored later in the quarter when halfback Bob Thereate lateraled to Gil Keith who ran 45 yards for the score. The fourth quarter saw a final touchdown by the Commandos.

Colorado totaled 162 in rushing yardage but also lost 59 such yards, while Wichita had 266 rushing yards with only 22 lost. The airmen were also limited to just one completed pass for no yards in 12 attempts with three being intercepted.

=== Week 3: vs. Albuquerque Air Base ===
Multiple lopsided defeats resulted in Waco Army Air Field canceling their game against the Aero Commandos, and Wichita scheduled Albuquerque Air Base in their place. The Kellys, who were missing eight players due to injuries, had their flight to Wichita delayed due to inclement weather the day before the game. As a result, they left Albuquerque on Sunday and the game was pushed back by half an hour from its original 2:30 start time to accommodate the visitors.

Due to the delay, the Kellys arrived minutes before kickoff. A muddy field resulted in both teams struggling to move downfield as the first half ended in a scoreless tie. The Commandos had scored shortly before halftime on a five-yard touchdown pass by Miller to Joe Byrnes, but it was nullified as Miller was too close to the line of scrimmage when he threw (the quarterback had to be five yards behind the line before throwing, a rule that existed in college at the time but which the NFL removed in 1933; the first half of the Commandos–Kellys game was played under collegiate rules while the second utilized the professional rulebook). Early in the third quarter, Miller fumbled while returning a punt on his team's ten-yard line which was recovered by Albuquerque's Charles Mathis. Eddie Marshall made a field goal from the 17-yard line to give the Kellys a 3–0 lead entering the fourth. A 61-yard punt by McEnulty was muffed by the Kellys and recovered by Wichita at the Albuquerque 27, which set up Miller's five-yard touchdown to Joe Byrnes. Another touchdown from Miller to Hayes was called back for illegal pre-snap motion. Nevertheless, the Commandos scored a second touchdown on Miller's five-yard pass to Godfrey.

The weather, which included more rain during the second half, resulted in the Commandos and Kellys only recording 79 and 17 rushing yards, respectively. Conversely, Wichita had 101 passing yards to Albuquerque's 20.

=== Week 4: vs. Randolph Field ===
The Texas-based Randolph Field Ramblers played the Commandos in their first game in Kansas. Wichita shuffled their starting lineup for the game, with Ronzani being named the first-string quarterback over Miller, Swede Ellstrom starting at halfback over Hayes, and Thurman Garrett taking over starting center duties.

Aided by having larger players than the military personnel of their opponent, Wichita had nearly triple the rushing yards of Randolph Field with 232 to 80. The Commandos also recorded nine times as many passing yards at 166 (on seven of 14 passes) to 21 (on three of 20) and ten more first downs with 17 to seven. McEnulty and Mooney helped lead the Commandos to a 55–0 win.

=== Week 5: vs. Fort Riley ===
The Fort Riley Centaurs took on the Commandos a week after defeating Wichita University, a game Bausch and Ronzani attended to analyze their upcoming opponent. In turn, Centaurs head coach Lieutenant Curry N. Vaughan and his staff had scouted the Commandos' first four games before attending the Randolph Field matchup a day after their Wichita University meeting. Bausch described the Centaurs' scouting of Wichita as granting them "the best of the deal. We did a lot of scoring against Randolph and used a lot of plays, while Fort Riley didn't uncover too much of their pet stuff." Much of Wichita's gameplanning focused on the Centaurs' running back Benny Sheridan, prompting Bausch to comment that "we'll have our hands full trying to stop him", along with opposing backs like ex-Georgia captain Bobby Nowell and former Bear Bobby Reale. Riley also gained the services of star Green Bay Packers center Lt. Tom Greenfield who had just returned from playing with Major Robert Neyland's All-Eastern Army Team. Vaughan proclaimed Wichita had "a lot of stuff, but I think we have a football club strong enough to defeat them."

After a scoreless first quarter, the Centaurs scored first on a seven-yard touchdown by Nowell to complete a 70-yard drive. Winford Johnson made a 20-yard field goal in the third quarter. Ronzani attempted to rally the offense in the fourth quarter, but one drive that reached Riley's red zone ended in a turnover on downs when his pass on fourth down was too low. Another Wichita offensive drive went as deep as the Centaurs' seven-yard line before being intercepted by Nelson Catlett.

Fort Riley accumulated 190 rushing yards while Wichita had 166, and both teams had nine first downs gained via running plays. Despite the similar rushing stats, the Commandos threw two interceptions, lost a fumble, and turned the ball over on downs thrice. The physicality of the game resulted in Commandos guard Jim Finlay being hospitalized.

=== Week 6: vs. Fort Sill ===
Wichita sought to rebound from their first loss of the season against Fort Sill, a team The Wichita Beacon described as "a classy squad [...] that boasts of plenty of split second runners who can fan the breeze in nothing flat." The Beacon predicted the game would be a "battle royal" as the Commandos had "some mighty nice looking speed merchants themselves".

Five minutes into the game, Hayes returned an interception 85 yards for a touchdown. Later in the first quarter, Fort Sill reached the Wichita 26-yard line before turning the ball over on downs. The second quarter began with Fort Sill quarterback Bert Roberts recovering a poor snap in his end zone for a Wichita safety. Wheeler ran for another score while Miller added a third touchdown of five yards to Joe Byrnes. A fourth quarter Fort Sill drive stalled on the Commandos' 14, from which Wichita drove 86 yards for the fourth and final touchdown of the game.

The Commandos outperformed Fort Sill in nearly every major statistical category including rushing yards (203–72), passing yards (124–3), and interceptions (4–1). Future Pro Football Hall of Fame inductee Red Grange was on the game's officiating crew as the head linesman; in a halftime public address, Grange praised the Commandos but commented that the interior of the team's line needed more strength.

=== Week 7: vs. Chicago Cardinals ===
After finishing 5–1 against military clubs, the Aero Commandos played the first of two NFL games against the struggling Chicago Cardinals, who had lost their last three games to drop to 3–5. Although the Cardinals were viewed as the superior team as an NFL franchise, head coach Jimmy Conzelman conceded the Commandos' T formation "has everything, and I'm frank to tell you I don't know how to stop it." Exacerbating matters for the Cardinals was the absence of ten players—primarily linemen—due to injuries. Bausch, who coached against the Cardinals while with the Eagles, declared that his team had "the plays to go against the Cards and we don't fear them. If we click we might come up with the upset of the season."

The opening quarter saw Chicago score three touchdowns, with two by Bud Schwenk on 16- and 11-yard runs and one by Bob Morrow via a 16-yard rush. The Cardinals added a fourth in the second quarter when McEnulty's punt was blocked on the Wichita 12-yard line, which was recovered by Alton Coppage and returned for a score. The quarter also saw the Commandos score their lone touchdown of the game on Hayes' 22-yard run. A fifth and final touchdown by the Cardinals came in the third period with Joe Bukant's pass to Frank Ivy.

Despite the 35–7 defeat, The Beacon claimed McEnulty brought "the fans to their feet" with a kick, aided by wind, that went approximately 120 yards. The Wichita Eagle's Pete Lightner also noted the Commandos were able to publicly uncover a key factor in the Cardinals' struggles against NFL opponents as they found success against Chicago's depleted line, especially among the less talented reserves once the Cardinals withdrew their starters.

=== Week 8: vs. Cleveland Rams ===
The 5–5 Cleveland Rams were the Commandos' final opponent. The Rams were fairly comparable to the Cardinals, with the teams splitting their two meetings in 1942; although the Cardinals had a better rushing offense, the Rams possessed a stronger passing attack despite losing star quarterback Jack Jacobs to the United States Navy. The Eagle described the Rams as "fully as tough" as the Cardinals though their offensive style, a modified T formation under coach Dutch Clark, was "more open" than Chicago's. The day before the game, Bausch announced he would retire as a player.

Cleveland's first score, a 55-yard touchdown pass from Parker Hall to Dante Magnani, came just two minutes into the game. In the following quarter, the Rams had an 80-yard drive that culminated in a touchdown run by George Morris. Herb Schlotthauer recorded Wichita's lone touchdown of the game in the third quarter on an 80-yard run.

The Commandos finished the season with a 5–3 record.

== Aftermath ==
The team did not continue in 1943, though Bausch remained at Aero Parts. A year later, he became an assistant coach at Wichita University.

Players like Garrett joined the military. Garrett enlisted in the Army and was stationed at Fort Sill before attending college at Oklahoma A&M University, though he was banned from playing for the football team as his stint with the Aero Commandos was ruled as professional football experience.

Some Commandos would later play for the Bears like McEnulty and Garrett. McEnulty won the 1943 NFL Championship Game in his first of two seasons with Chicago, while Garrett played in 1947 and 1948.
