= Bernie Digris =

American football player (1919–1979)

No. 37
- Positions: Tackle, guard

Personal information
- Born: June 9, 1919; Union City, Connecticut, U.S.
- Died: November 1, 1979 (aged 60); Roanoke, Virginia, U.S.

Career information
- High school: Ansonia (Ansonia, Connecticut); St. John's Prep (Danvers, Massachusetts)
- College: Holy Cross
- NFL draft: 1943: undrafted

Career history
- Chicago Bears (1943)

Awards and highlights
- NFL champion (1943)

Career NFL statistics
- Games played: 2
- Games started: 0

Bernard John Digris (June 9, 1919 – November 1, 1979) was an American professional football tackle and guard for the Chicago Bears of the National Football League (NFL) and was a member of their 1943 NFL Championship team. Digris played in two games for the Bears during that year.

== Early life and education ==
Digris attended Ansonia High School in Ansonia, Connecticut, where he is a member of the school's sports hall of fame.

Digris was a graduate of the College of the Holy Cross in Worcester, Massachusetts, where he captained their football team. He was the first graduate of Holy Cross on a football scholarship to leave with a degree other than Physical Education. His degree was in Chemistry.

== Military service ==
After playing professional football, Digris served in the United States Navy during World War II.

== Later life ==
Digris later worked a technical salesman for General Tire & Rubber Company. He died on November 1, 1979, at a hospital in Roanoke, Virginia.
