= Ansonia High School (Connecticut) =

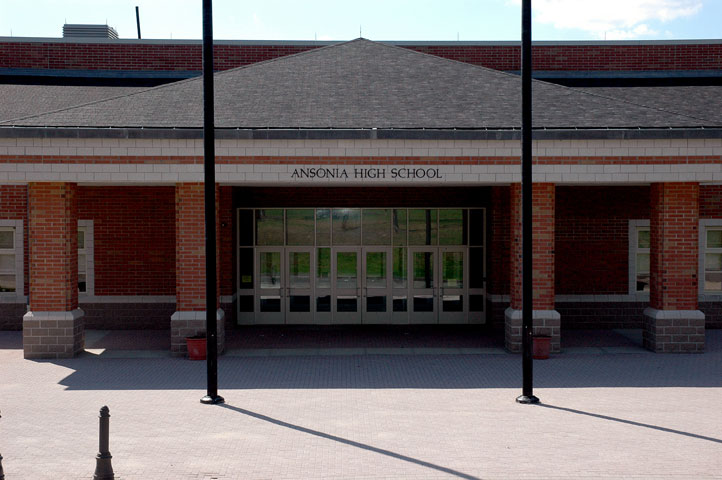

Location
- 20 Pulaski Highway; Ansonia, Connecticut 06401; United States
- 41°19′47″N 73°03′50″W

Information
- School type: High school
- Established: 1675 (351 years ago)
- Sister school: Derby
- Superintendent: Joseph DiBacco
- CEEB code: 070000
- Principal: Paul Giansanti
- Employees: 48.00 (FTE)
- Enrollment: 617 (2024–2025)
- Student to teacher ratio: 12.85
- Colors: Blue and white
- Song: Oh Lavender
- Nickname: Chargers
- Team name: Ansonia Chargers
- Rival: Naugatuck High School
- Accreditation: Connecticut State Department of Education
- Newspaper: The Charger Pride
- Alumni: John Cooke; Samuel Jaskilka
- Website: www.ansonia.org/schools/ansonia-high-school

Ansonia High School is a public four-year high school located in Ansonia, Connecticut. It has approximately 513 students in grades 9 through 12. About 31.6 percent of the student body is Caucasian; 68.4 percent is minority. The school is accredited by the New England Association of Colleges and Secondary Schools, and the Connecticut State Department of Education.

== Facilities ==
Ansonia High School was originally located on the east side of the Naugatuck River, at the foot of Prospect Street, near the intersection of North and South Cliff Street. Today, the lot serves as a small park and playground. The building burned in a massive fire on February 23, 1939. According to the Evening Sentinel, the building was being used for eighth and ninth grade at the time of the fire, and served 590 students. The fire started in the basement and ten were injured while fighting it.

The original building was erected in 1880. A new high school was opened in 1937, located on Howard Avenue on the west side of the Naugatuck River. This was relocated to the east side, where a new building opened in 1999. The previous building became the new Ansonia Middle School.

The school has 48 employees and have an average of 13.9 years of experience. 80 percent have a master's degree and 42 percent trained for the Beginning Educator Support and Training (BEST) program as mentors, assessors, or cooperating teachers. The school year contains two semesters and four marking periods. The minimum passing grade for the school is a 60.

== Sports ==
In the mid-1970s, the high school adopted the "Chargers" as its mascot.

Ansonia is part of the Naugatuck Valley League

The football team has won the Walter Camp Football Foundation's Joseph W. Kelly Trophy - awarded to Connecticut's top football team - in '83, '89, '05, '06, '07, and '13.

It has placed boys in the all-star basketball team for the state. The boys' football team has also produced players who have been recruited for colleges.

Wins in CIAC State Championships
Sport	Class	Year(s)
Baseball	S	1990
Baseball	M	1974
Basketball (boys)	L	1995
Basketball (girls)	M	1978
Basketball (girls)	L	1977
Cheer	S	1999, 2007, 2023, 2024
Cheer	M	2025
Football	S	1976, 1977, 1987, 1988, 1989, 1995, 2002, 2003, 2006, 2007, 2012, 2013, 2016, 2022, 2024
Football	SS	1994
Football	S-II	1981, 1982, 1983, 1984
Football	M	1979, 2011

== Notable alumni ==
- Treat Baldwin Johnson (1893), chemist
- Bernie Digris (1937), former NFL offensive lineman
- Samuel Jaskilka (1937), US Marine 4-star general
- Allan Webb (1949), former NFL defensive back and coach
- John Cooke (1955), rower, Olympic gold medalist
- Shirlee Taylor Haizlip (1955), author
- Richard A. Brualdi (1957), mathematics professor at the University of Wisconsin–Madison
- Ron Gardin (1962), former NFL defensive back
- Sandy Osiecki (1978), former NFL quarterback
- Eric Stokes (1981), former NFL offensive lineman
- Glenn Antrum (1984), former NFL wide receiver
- Priscilla Garita (1986), actress
- Ramondo Stallings (1990), former NFL defensive end
- AR Fox (2005), professional wrestler for AEW
- Loosey LaDuca (2007), drag performer who performed on RuPaul's Drag Race

== See also ==
- List of high school football rivalries more than 100 years old
- List of high schools in Connecticut
