= Elmo Kelly =

American football player (1917–1996)

No. 76
- Position: End

Personal information
- Born: February 10, 1917; Tipton, Oklahoma, U.S.
- Died: December 28, 1996 (aged 79); Shawnee, Oklahoma, U.S.
- Listed height: 6 ft 1 in (1.85 m)
- Listed weight: 200 lb (91 kg)

Career information
- High school: Tipton
- College: Wichita
- NFL draft: 1943: undrafted

Career history
- Chicago Bears (1944)
- Stats at Pro Football Reference

Elmo Lee Kelly (February 10, 1917 – December 28, 1996) was an American professional football end who played for the Chicago Bears of the National Football League (NFL). He played college football for the Oklahoma Baptist Bison and Wichita Shockers.

== Early life ==
Elmo Lee Kelly was born on February 10, 1917, in Tipton, Oklahoma. He attended Tipton High School.

== College career ==
In 1938, Kelly played junior college football at Altus Junior College in Altus, Oklahoma. He transferred to Oklahoma Baptist University, where he played college football for the Bison from 1939 to 1940. As a sophomore in 1940, he earned second-team All-Oklahoma Collegiate Athletic Conference and Associated Press first-team All-Oklahoma honors. Oklahoma Baptist dropped football after the 1940 season. The Bison went 16–4–1 during Kelly's two seasons there. He then transferred to Wichita University to play for the Shockers in 1941.

== Professional career ==
Kelly played for the independent Wichita Aero Commandos in 1942. He played in three of five games for the Chicago Bears in 1944 as a backup end.

== Personal life ==
After his NFL career, Kelly lived in Shawnee, Oklahoma and worked as a geologist until his death. He died on December 28, 1996, in Shawnee.
