= Johnny Long (American football) =

American football player (1914–1975)

No. 33
- Position: Quarterback

Personal information
- Born: December 13, 1914; South Orange, New Jersey, U.S.
- Died: February 3, 1975 (aged 60); Mount Holly, New Jersey, U.S.

Career information
- College: Colgate

Career history
- Chicago Bears (1944–1945)

Career statistics
- TD–INT: 1–1
- Passing yards: 128
- Passer rating: 87.8
- Stats at Pro Football Reference

John Anton Long (December 13, 1914 – February 3, 1975) was an American football quarterback in the National Football League (NFL). He played for the Chicago Bears. He played college football for the Colgate Raiders.

== NFL career statistics ==
Legend
**Bold**	Career high

=== Regular season ===
Year	Team	Games		Passing									Rushing					Punting			
Year	Team	GP	GS	Comp	Att	Pct	Yds	Avg	Lng	TD	Int	Rate	Att	Yds	Avg	Lng	TD	Punts	Yds	Lng	Avg
1944	CHI	**9**	**6**	**9**	**14**	**64.3**	**128**	**9.1**	**51**	**1**	**1**	**87.8**	**24**	2	0.1	**12**	**0**	**7**	**249**	**52**	35.6
1945	CHI	3	2	—	—	—	—	—	—	—	—	—	2	**3**	**1.5**	5	**0**	1	42	42	**42.0**
Career		12	8	9	14	64.3	128	9.1	51	1	1	87.8	26	5	0.2	12	0	8	291	52	36.4
