= Frank Bausch =

American football player (1908–1976)

Profile
- Position: Center

Personal information
- Born: June 14, 1908; Marion, South Dakota, U.S.
- Died: April 6, 1976 (aged 67); Wichita, Kansas, U.S.
- Listed height: 6 ft 3 in (1.91 m)
- Listed weight: 220 lb (100 kg)

Career information
- High school: Wichita (KS) Cathedral
- College: Kansas

Career history

Playing
- Boston Redskins (1934–1936); Chicago Bears (1937–1940); Philadelphia Eagles (1941); Wichita Aero Commandos (1942)

Coaching
- Philadelphia Eagles (1941) Line coach; Wichita Aero Commandos (1942) Head coach; Wichita (1944–1945) Assistant coach

Awards and highlights
- NFL champion (1940); Pro Bowl (1940); First-team All-Pro (1936); Second-team All-Big Six (1929)

Career statistics
- Games played: 78
- Starts: 58
- Stats at Pro Football Reference

Frank Joseph "Pete" Bausch (June 14, 1908 – April 6, 1976) was an American football center in the National Football League (NFL) for the Boston Redskins, the Chicago Bears, and the Philadelphia Eagles. He played college football at the University of Kansas.

== Biography ==
Bausch was regarded as one of NFL's top centers in the 1930s, being named first-team All-Pro in 1936. During his tenure with the Bears, he became a close friend of head coach George Halas, who personally nominated him for the Pro Football Hall of Fame. When Bausch was named the head coach of the Wichita Aero Commandos in 1942, Halas gave his blessing to the team and formed an agreement with the Commandos to become a farm team for the Bears. Bausch was a player-coach for the Commandos and Eagles before retiring from playing at the end of the former's 1942 season. After the Commandos shut down, Bausch remained employed by the team's owner Wichita Aero Parts Manufacturing Company and became an assistant at Wichita University.

Upon concluding his involvement in football, Bausch co-founded Weyl-Bausch Tire Co., which became one of the top tire sellers in the Midwestern United States. He died of a heart attack in 1976.

His older brother Jim Bausch played halfback in the NFL and won a gold medal at the 1932 Summer Olympics in the decathlon.
