= Sandy Osiecki =

American football player (born 1960)

No. 11
- Position: Quarterback

Personal information
- Born: May 18, 1960 (age 66); Ansonia, Connecticut, U.S.
- Listed height: 6 ft 5 in (1.96 m)
- Listed weight: 202 lb (92 kg)

Career information
- High school: Ansonia (Ansonia, Connecticut)
- College: Arizona State
- NFL draft: 1984: undrafted

Career history
- Arizona Wranglers (1984)*; Kansas City Chiefs (1984–1985); Buffalo Bills (1986)*; Cincinnati Bengals (1986)*; Kansas City Chiefs (1987)
- * Offseason or practice squad member only

Career NFL statistics
- TD–INT: 0-1
- Passing yards: 64
- Passer rating: 27.6
- Stats at Pro Football Reference

Stanley Eugene "Sandy" Osiecki (born May 18, 1960) is a former quarterback in the National Football League (NFL). He played college football at Arizona State.

== Early life ==
Osiecki was born and grew up in Ansonia, Connecticut, and attended Ansonia High School, where he played on the baseball and football teams. He was a three-year starter for the Chargers and helped lead the team to a New England-record 36 straight wins and two consecutive state titles. He signed to play college football at Arizona State University after receiving scholarship offers from over 60 schools.

== College career ==
Osiecki played in one game as a true freshman and also started for the Sun Devils' junior varsity team. He played one total snap as a sophomore. After his sophomore year, Osiecki won the starting quarterback job, but he suffered a season-ending knee injury against Oregon in the season opener, and ultimately Todd Hons replaced him. Osiecki served as the team's holder and backup quarterback for his final two seasons. He finished his collegiate career completing 13 of 28 passes for 204 yards with one touchdown and three interceptions in 25 games played.

== Professional career ==
Osiecki was selected by the Arizona Wranglers in the 1984 USFL Territorial Draft, but was cut during training camp. He was signed by the Kansas City Chiefs in 1984 and served as the team's third-string quarterback. Osiecki appeared in four games with the Chiefs. Osiecki's most significant playing time came on November 4, 1984 against the Seattle Seahawks, completing seven of 16 passes for 64 yards with one interception in the fourth quarter. The interception was returned for a touchdown and was the fourth such interception in the same game, an NFL record. He was cut by the Chiefs at the end of training camp in 1985. Osiecki spent the 1986 offseason on the Buffalo Bills until being released. He was signed by the Cincinnati Bengals but did not make the final roster out of training camp. Osiecki returned to the Chiefs in October 1987 as a replacement player during the 1987 NFL players strike and was released after the strike ended.

== Personal life ==
Osiecki's son Mike was Connecticut's state Gatorade Player of the Year in 2008 and played college football at the University of Connecticut before retiring from football due to concussions. A second son, Ryan, played quarterback at the University of New Haven.
