= Doug McEnulty =

American football player (1922–1991)

No. 29
- Position: Fullback

Personal information
- Born: January 16, 1922; Tonganoxie, Kansas, U.S.
- Died: January 12, 1991 (aged 68); Everett, Washington, U.S.
- Listed height: 6 ft 3 in (1.91 m)
- Listed weight: 215 lb (98 kg)

Career information
- High school: Wichita (KS) East
- College: Wichita

Career history
- Wichita Aero Commandos (1942); Chicago Bears (1943–1944)

Awards and highlights
- NFL champion (1943)

Career statistics
- Carries: 24
- Rushing yards: 56
- Rushing touchdowns: 0
- Receptions: 3
- Receiving yards: 20
- Receiving touchdowns: 2
- Punts: 29
- Punting yards: 1,180
- Stats at Pro Football Reference

Douglas M. McEnulty (January 16, 1922 – January 12, 1991) was an American football player in the National Football League (NFL). Born in Tonganoxie, Kansas, McEnulty played college football at Wichita University.

McEnulty played fullback and punter. His professional career began in 1942 as a member of the Wichita Aero Commandos, where he started at the two positions before playing with the NFL's Chicago Bears during the 1943 and 1944 seasons. Owing to his size, he was nicknamed "Big Doug".
