= George Somers (American football) =

American football player (1915–1964)

No. 19
- Positions: Offensive tackle, Placekicker

Personal information
- Born: October 5, 1915; Fountain Springs, Pennsylvania, U.S.
- Died: January 12, 1964 (aged 48); Pottsville, Pennsylvania, U.S.
- Listed height: 6 ft 2 in (1.88 m)
- Listed weight: 253 lb (115 kg)

Career information
- High school: St. Clair (St. Clair, Pennsylvania)
- College: La Salle (1935-1938)
- NFL draft: 1939: 8th round, 64th overall pick

Career history
- Philadelphia Eagles (1939–1940); Pittsburgh Steelers (1941–1942)

Awards and highlights
- First-team Little All-American (1938)

Career NFL statistics
- Field goals: 2/12
- Field goal %: 16.7
- Extra points: 2/2
- Extra point %: 100
- Stats at Pro Football Reference

George Anthony Somers (October 5, 1915 – January 12, 1964) was an American professional football offensive tackle and kicker. He is one of only two La Salle Explorers to enter the National Football League (NFL) and the only one selected in the NFL draft. Before playing for the Philadelphia Eagles and Pittsburgh Steelers, Somers was a star at La Salle University – captaining the 1938 team. Somers also received the Maxwell Club Award as best tackle in district, Associated Press (AP) and Collier's Little All-America tackle in 1938, AP All-Pennsylvania, and AP All-Eastern Honorable Mention.
