= Hal Brill =

American football player (1914–1980)

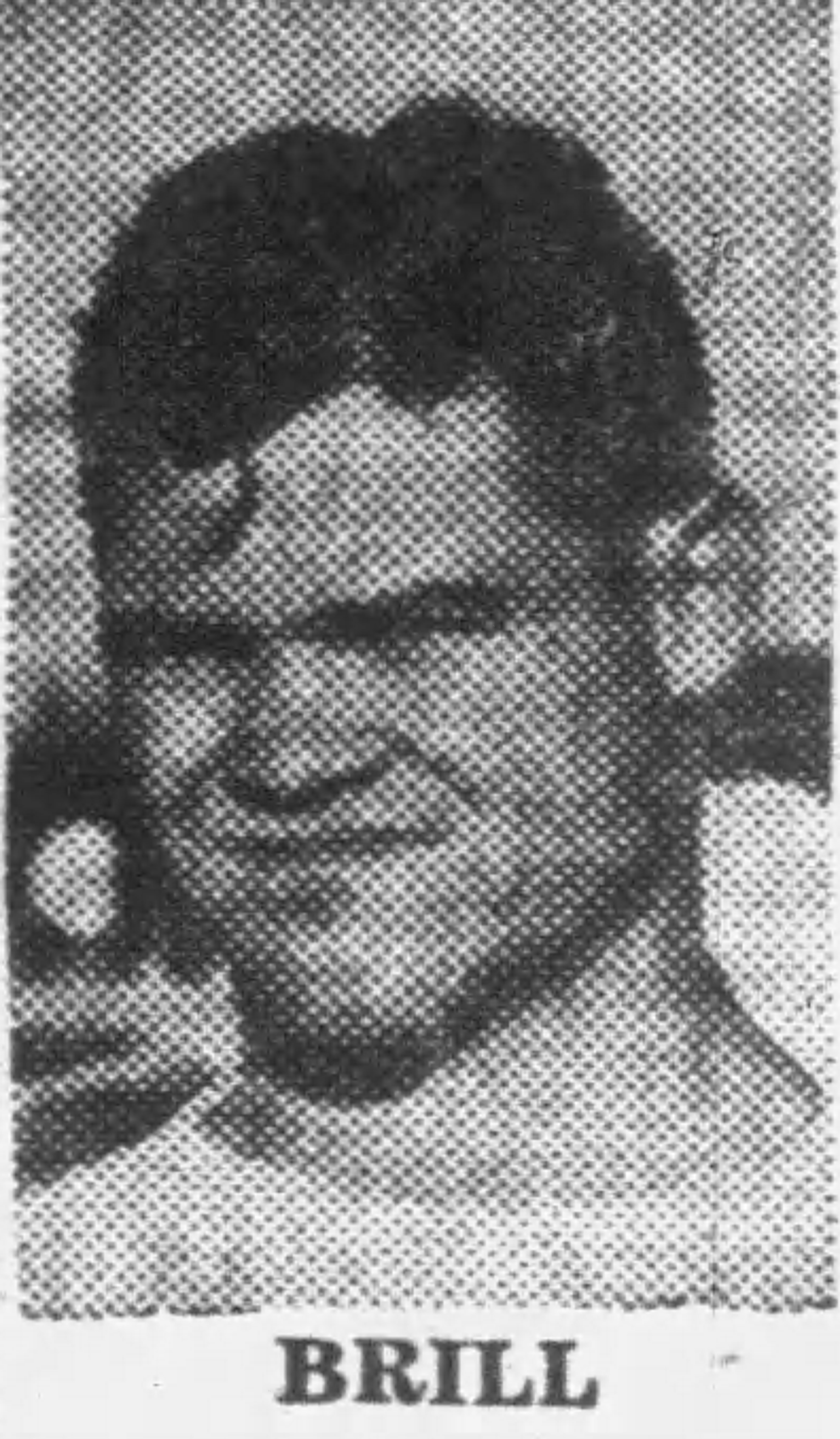
- Brill, 1938

No. 4
- Position: Tailback

Personal information
- Born: March 26, 1914; Clay Center, Kansas, U.S.
- Died: September 2, 1980 (aged 66); Wichita, Kansas, U.S.
- Listed height: 5 ft 10 in (1.78 m)
- Listed weight: 175 lb (79 kg)

Career information
- High school: Norton (Norton, Kansas)
- College: Wichita
- NFL draft: 1939: undrafted

Career history
- Detroit Lions (1939); Los Angeles Bulldogs (1939)

Awards and highlights
- Second-team Little All-American (1938)

Career NFL statistics
- Games played: 2
- Games started: 0
- Stats at Pro Football Reference

Harold Edwin Brill (March 26, 1914 – September 2, 1980) was an American professional football tailback.

A native of Clay Center, Kansas, Brill attended the Norton High School and then played college football at Wichita University. He played for the 1938 Wichita Shockers football team that won a conference championship with a 7–2–1 record (4–0 in conference). He was selected as a second-team back on the 1938 Little All-America college football team.

Brill left school after the conclusion of the 1938 football season, stating that he could not afford to go to college any more. He then signed with the Detroit Lions of the National Football League (NFL) and mmade the club's lineup in September 1939. He appeared in two games for the Lions during the 1939 season. The Lions waived him in October 1939. He finished the 1939 season with the Los Angeles Bulldogs of the American Professional Football Association.

He later worked for Beech Aircraft Company. He died in 1980 at age 66 in Wichita, Kansas.
