= 1938 Little All-America college football team =

American college football all-star team

The 1938 Little All-America college football team is composed of college football players from small colleges and universities who were selected by the Associated Press (AP) as the best players at each position. For 1938, the AP selected both a first team and a second team.

== First-team ==
Position	Player	Team
B	Ted Panish	Bradley Tech
B	Darrell Tully	East Texas Teachers
B	Samuel Roeder	Franklin & Marshall
B	Gaylon Smith	Southwestern (TN)
E	Lloyd Thomas	San José State
E	Kenneth Moore	Roanoke
T	George Somers	La Salle
T	Myron Claxton	Whittier
G	Robert Sutton	Chattanooga
G	Dan Buckovitch	Toledo
C	John Horton	Morehead State

== Second-team ==
Position	Player	Team
B	Sammy Padjen	Dickinson
B	Bobby Kientz	Pacific
B	Ev Elkins	Marshall
B	Hal Brill	Wichita
E	George Abbott	Willamette
E	Ehrwald Stromquist	Abilene Christian
T	Frank Crisci	Western Reserve
T	Pete Gudauskas	Murray State
T	Leo Gruszkowski	Centre
G	John Duich	San Diego State

== See also ==
- 1938 College Football All-America Team
