= Ev Elkins =

American football player (1917–1977)

No. 11, 3
- Position: Back

Personal information
- Born: November 17, 1917; Hamlin, West Virginia, U.S.
- Died: June 8, 1977 (aged 59); Hamlin, West Virginia, U.S.
- Listed height: 5 ft 11 in (1.80 m)
- Listed weight: 190 lb (86 kg)

Career information
- High school: Hamlin
- College: Marshall (1936-1939)
- NFL draft: 1939: 17th round, 151st overall pick

Career history
- Chicago Cardinals (1940); New York Yankees (1940-1941)

Awards and highlights
- Second-team Little All-American (1938)

Career NFL statistics
- Games played: 1
- Stats at Pro Football Reference

Everett Lee "Boots" Elkins (November 17, 1917 – June 8, 1977) was an American professional football back.

Elkins was born in 1917 at Hamlin, West Virginia. He attended Hamlin High School.

Elkins played college football for Marshall College from 1937 to 1939. He played college football as a fullback at Marshall. He led the nation in scoring through most of the 1938 season but dropped to second when Marshall's final game was cancelled due to snow. He finished the year with 15 touchdowns in nine games.

Elkins was drafted by the Chicago Cardinals with the 151st pick in the 1939 NFL draft. He played for the Cardinals during the 1940 season. He also played for the New York Yankees in the 1940 and 1941. He appeared in a total of seven games on both offense and defense at fullback, halfback, and quarterback.

Elkins died in 1977 at age 59 in Hamlin, West Virginia.
