= Central High School (Columbus, Ohio) =

Historic school in Columbus, Ohio, US

- U.S. National Register of Historic Places
- Columbus Register of Historic Properties
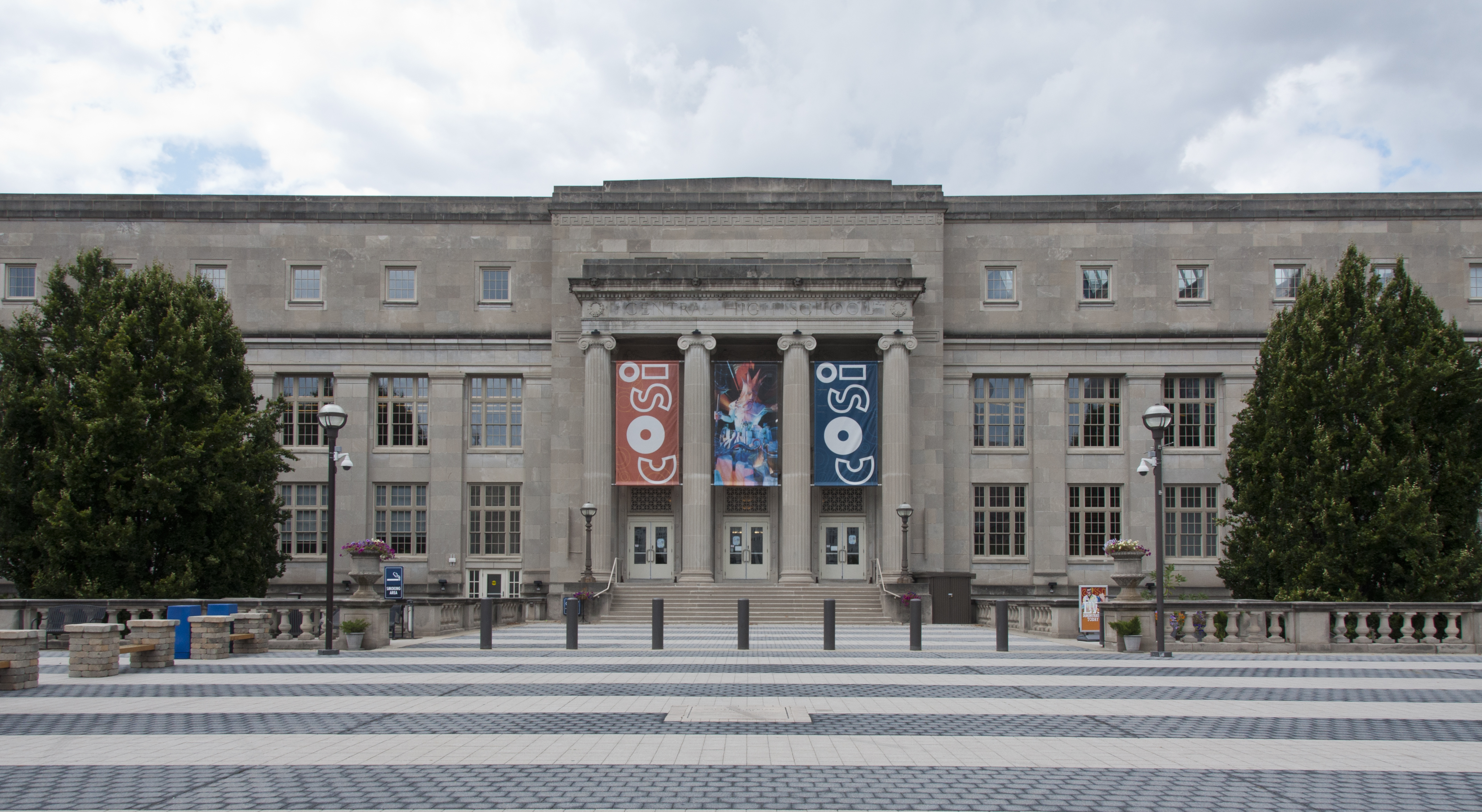
- East facade of the 1924 building
- Interactive map highlighting the building's location
- Location: Columbus, Ohio
- Coordinates: 39°57′34″N 83°0′27″W
- Built: 1924
- Architect: William B. Ittner
- Architectural style: Classical Revival
- NRHP reference No.: 85000484
- CRHP No.: CR-50

Significant dates
- Added to NRHP: March 7, 1985
- Designated CRHP: July 5, 1991

Central High School, also known as High School of Columbus and High School of Commerce, was a four-year secondary school (grades 9–12) located in Franklinton, Columbus, Ohio. It was a part of Columbus City Schools (at the time Columbus Public Schools). On March 7, 1985, the 1924 school building was added to the National Register of Historic Places. It is considered part of the Columbus Civic Center Historic District.

== History ==
Central High School dates to the earliest high school education in Columbus. In its 1862 building and in prior homes, it was known as Columbus High School, and was the only high school in the city.

From 1862 to c. 1928, Central High School was located at East Broad and Sixth Street, current site of the Capital University Law School. It was considered an architectural ornament for Columbus, and featured a 150-ft.-tall tower. The site was purchased in 1859 and construction was underway from 1860 to 1861, with a cost of $23,400. The school opened in the following fall term. It was originally able to house 300 students, increased as expansions opened in following years. The building was designed by architect Nathan B. Kelley. It closed in 1924 and was demolished in 1928.

The last building for the school was located at 75 South Washington Boulevard and opened in 1924. Because of declining enrollment in the school district and deterioration of the building, Central High School permanently closed following the 1981–1982 school year, in June 1982. After the closure, Central High School was used as a shooting location for scenes in the 1984 film Teachers, depicting the fictional "John F. Kennedy High School".

Columbus Public Schools sold the building to the City of Columbus for $15 million in 1988. In July 1994, Columbus City Council granted the science museum the Center of Science and Industry (COSI) a 28-year lease on the building. COSI remodeled portions of it for the new site of a museum, incorporating the building's historic facade into the structure, designed by architect Arata Isozaki. Isozaki used the high school's 1924 exterior facing downtown as its east entrance; a balance to the facility's progressively futuristic west entrance. On November 6, 1999 COSI moved into the old Central High School building.

Early locations of Columbus High School

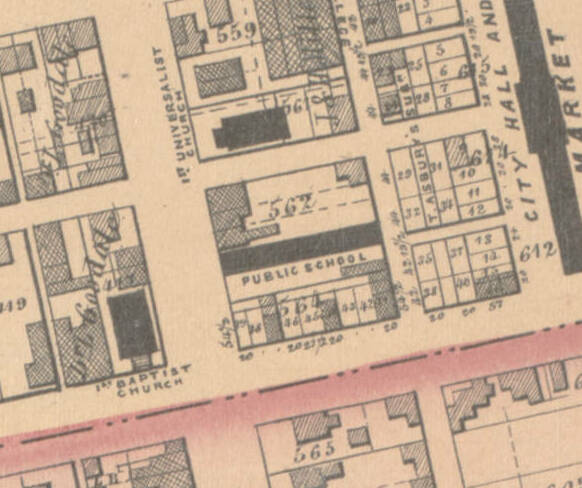
Middle Building, 1847-1848

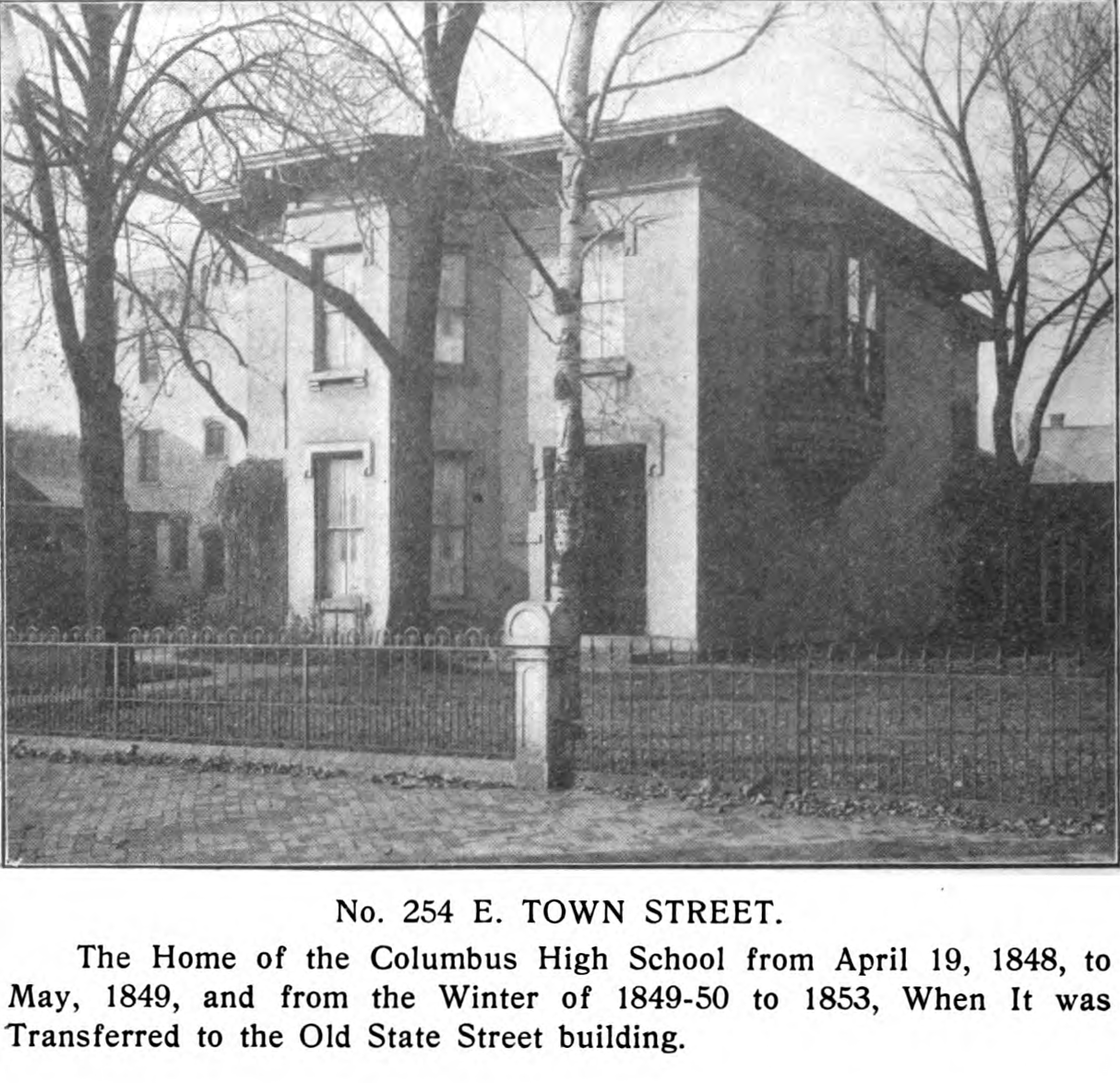
Covert Building, April 1848-May 1849 and winter 1849/50-1853

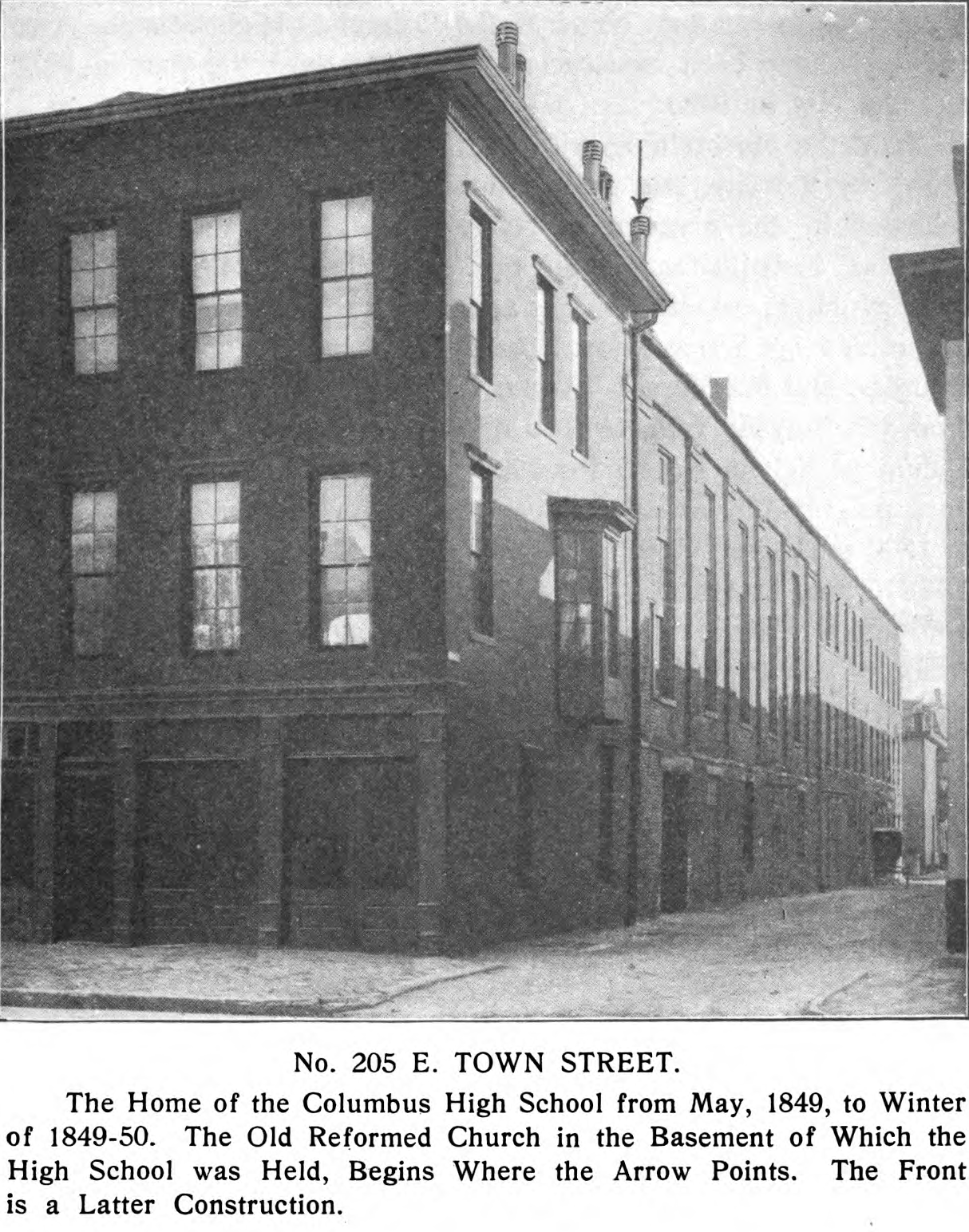
May 1849-winter 1849/1850

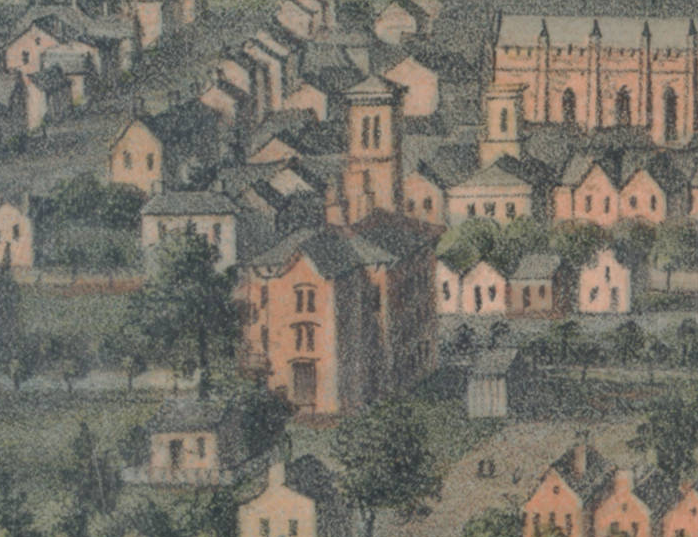
Old State Street School, 1853-1862

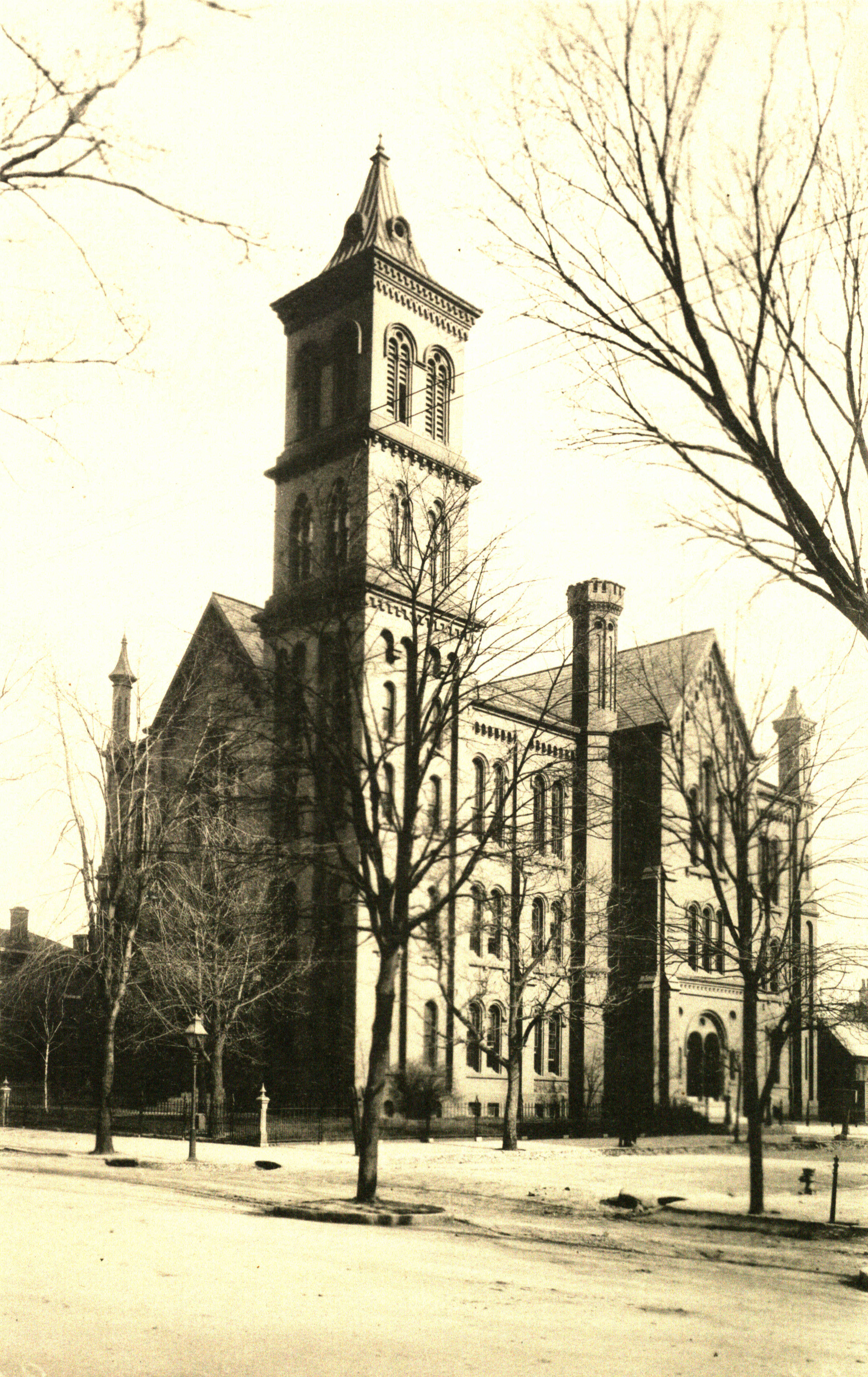
1862-1924

== Athletics ==
Ohio High School Athletic Association team state championships:

- Baseball – 1929
- Boys' Golf – 1937
- Boys' Track and Field – 1927, 1928, 1929, 1930
- Boys' Gymnastics - 1929, 1930

== Notable alumni ==
- George Bellows, American realist painter, known for his depictions of urban life in New York City
- Howard Cassady, Heisman Trophy winner of 1955 for the Ohio State University; professional football player for the Detroit Lions, Cleveland Browns and Philadelphia Eagles and baseball coach for the Columbus Clippers.
- Harold Cooper, Franklin County Commissioner, President of the Columbus Jets and the International League
- Fred Cornell, author of Carmen Ohio
- Bob Kline, former MLB player (Boston Red Sox, Philadelphia Athletics, Washington Senators)
- Perry L. Miles, U.S. Army brigadier general
- Dave Roberts, Major League Baseball pitcher
- Dom Sigillo, American football player
- Mose Solomon, the "Rabbi of Swat," Major League Baseball player
- Ernie Wheelwright, American football player and actor

== See also ==
- National Register of Historic Places listings in Columbus, Ohio
- Schools in Columbus, Ohio
