= Ron Gardin =

American football player (1944–2025)

No. 30, 37
- Position: Defensive back

Personal information
- Born: September 25, 1944; New Haven, Connecticut, U.S.
- Died: April 4, 2025 (aged 80); Phoenix, Arizona, U.S.
- Listed height: 5 ft 11 in (1.80 m)
- Listed weight: 180 lb (82 kg)

Career information
- High school: Ansonia (Ansonia, Connecticut)
- College: Cameron; Arizona
- NFL draft: 1970: 6th round, 148th overall pick

Career history
- Baltimore Colts (1970–1971); New England Patriots (1971)

Awards and highlights
- Super Bowl champion (V)

Career NFL statistics
- Fumble recoveries: 1
- Return yards: 1,005
- Total TDs: 1
- Stats at Pro Football Reference

Ron Gardin (September 25, 1944 – April 4, 2025) was an American professional football player who was a defensive back and kick returner in the National Football League (NFL). He played college football for the Arizona Wildcats and was selected in the sixth round of the 1970 NFL draft. Gardin played in Super Bowl V for the Baltimore Colts.

== College career ==
A standout four-sport athlete in at Ansonia High School in Connecticut, Gardin enlisted in the army after graduating in 1962. After he was discharged, he played college football Cameron Junior College and then at the University of Arizona, where he led the Wildcats in receiving in 1968 with 892 yards and then in rushing in 1969 with 759 yards. Gardin played in the Coaches All-American Game in Lubbock, Texas in June, scoring a touchdown reception and winning the Ernie Davis Award for inspiring play.

== Pro career ==
The 26-year-old Gardin was selected in the sixth round of the 1970 NFL draft by the Colts.The highlight of his rookie season was an 80-yard punt for a touchdown against the Miami Dolphins. Gardin finished second in the AFC in punt returns with 28 for 330 yards and an 11.8 average.

Gardin returned punts in Baltimore's two playoff games and then in the Colts Super Bowl victory. His three fair catches in the Super Bowl were a record that stood until Super Bowl XXXV. Gardin was also the first Arizona grad to play in the Super Bowl.

The Colts traded Gardin to the New England Patriots early in the 1971 season for a 5th-round draft pick. In June of 1972 he was traded to the Pittsburgh Steelers, but we was waived during training camp and then signed by the Miami Dolphins, but spent the season on the injured list. He signed with the Green Bay Packers in January 1973 but was released in May, ending his NFL career.

== Later career ==
After his professional football career ended, Gardin worked at a car dealership and as a Recreational Coordinator for the Marty Birdman Recreation Center in the Tucson Parks and Recreation Department. He was a past president of the NFL's Retired Players Association.

Gardin died at an assisted living center in Phoenix, in April 2025, at the age of 80.
