= Samuel Jaskilka =

United States Marine Corps general

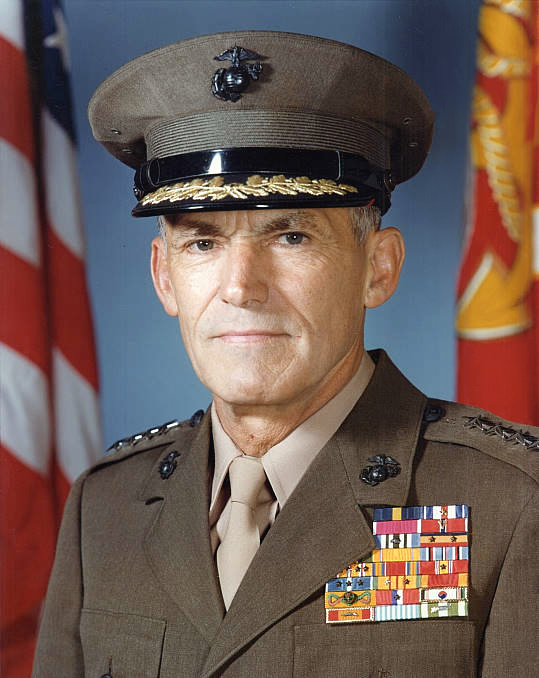
- General Jaskilka in 1976
- Born: December 15, 1919; Ansonia, Connecticut, U.S.
- Died: January 15, 2012 (aged 92); Arlington County, Virginia, U.S.
- Military career
- Allegiance: United States
- Branch: United States Marine Corps
- Service years: 1942–1978
- Rank: General
- Commands: 2nd Marine Division
- Conflicts: World War II; Battle of Tarawa; Korean War; Battle of Inchon; Battle of Chosin Reservoir; Vietnam War
- Awards: Distinguished Service Medal; Silver Star (2); Legion of Merit; Bronze Star

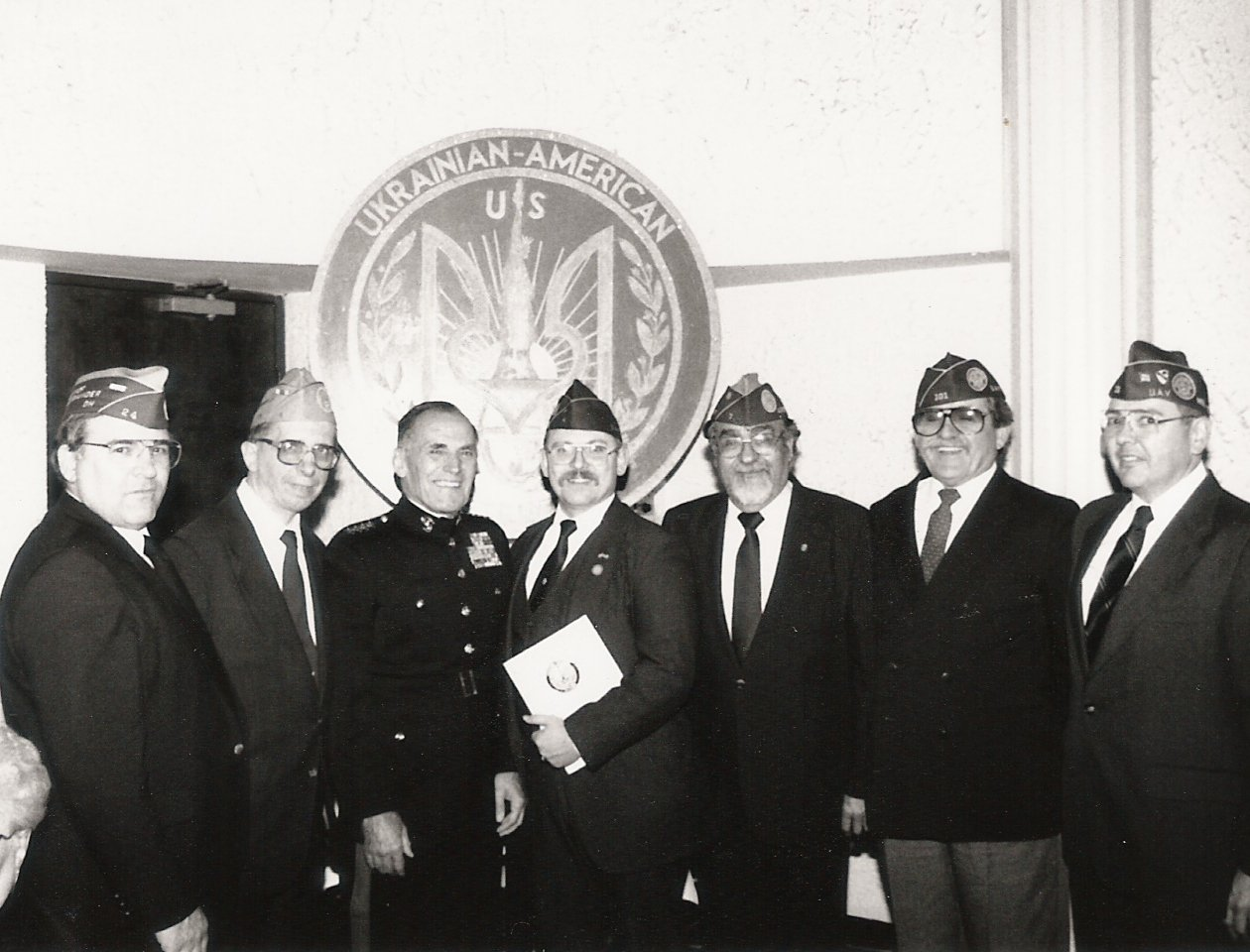
Gen. Sam Jaskilka met with representatives of the Ukrainian American Veterans at Buffalo, N.Y. in 1989.

Samuel Jaskilka (December 15, 1919 – January 15, 2012) was a U.S. Marine four-star general whose last assignment was Assistant Commandant of the United States Marine Corps (1975–1978). General Jaskilka was a highly decorated veteran of the Korean War, having led the landing at Inchon as a company commander with the 2nd Battalion, 5th Marines. He retired from the Marine Corps in 1978 after 36 years of service.

== Early life and education ==
Samuel Jaskilka was born on December 15, 1919, in Ansonia, Connecticut, in a family of Ukrainian-Americans. He graduated from Ansonia High School in 1937. In May 1942, he graduated from the University of Connecticut, earning a Bachelor of Science degree in Bachelor of Business Administration.

On September 26, 1942, Jaskilka accepted an appointment as a second lieutenant in the U.S. Marine Corps Reserve and was assigned to active duty. He completed the Reserve Officers' Class, Marine Corps Schools, Quantico, Virginia, in 1942, and completed the Sea School at Portsmouth, Virginia, in 1943. He accepted an appointment in the regular Marine Corps in March 1943.

== Career ==
=== World War II ===
During World War II, Jaskilka served aboard the USS Princeton and participated in the Tarawa Island raid, the Gilbert Islands Operation, the Marshall Islands Operation, Palau, Yap, Ulithi, Wolei raids, Marianas Operation, Western Caroline Islands Operation and the Leyte Operation. He served on the USS Princeton and survived its sinking in the Battle of Leyte Gulf On October 24, 1944. He was promoted to first lieutenant on June 22, 1943.

Upon his return to the United States, he was assigned duty as instructor, Headquarters Company, Troop Leaders Battalion, Camp Pendleton, California until August 1945. He was promoted to captain in January 1945.

=== After the war ===
From September 1945 until May 1947, Captain Jaskilka saw tours of independent duty with District Headquarters Recruiting Station, Manchester, New Hampshire, and District Headquarters Recruiting Station in Philadelphia, Pennsylvania. In January 1948, he completed the Amphibious Warfare School, Junior Course, Marine Corps Schools, Quantico, and became commanding officer, Marine detachment, U.S. Naval Air Activities, Port Lyautey, French Morocco.

=== Korean War ===
In September 1949, Jaskilka joined the 1st Marine Division and later embarked with the division for Korea serving successively as battalion executive officer and commanding officer of Company E, 2nd Battalion, 5th Marines. He led the first wave of Marines onto Red Beach on September 15, 1950, in the Invasion of Inchon, Pusan Perimeter as CO of Company E of the 2/5. For heroism in combat in Korea, he received two awards of the Silver Star and a Bronze Star with Combat "V". He was promoted to major in January 1951.

=== Post Korean War ===
Jaskilka returned to the States in February 1952 and served as monitor, Detail Branch, Personnel Department, Headquarters Marine Corps. In July 1954, he was transferred to Marine Corps Base, Camp Pendleton, for duty as operations officer, Marine Corps Test Unit #1. He was promoted to lieutenant colonel in December 1955.

Upon completion of the Amphibious Warfare School, Senior Course, Marine Corps Schools, Quantico, in June 1957, LtCol Jaskilka had a three-year tour of duty as assistant G-3 operations and plans officer with Fleet Marine Force, Pacific. He returned to Quantico in July 1960 and served as an instructor at the Senior School.

He reported to the 3rd Marine Division, Fleet Marine Force in July 1963, and was assigned duty as executive officer, Third Marines, and later, assistant chief of staff, G-3, SEATO Expeditionary Brigade. Following his return to the United States, he assumed duty as joint staff officer in the Office of the Joint Chiefs of Staff, and earned the Joint Service Commendation Medal. He was promoted to colonel in July 1964.

In August 1966, he was reassigned to Headquarters Marine Corps, where he served consecutively as deputy manpower coordinator for research and information systems, G-1 Division; as director, Data Systems Division; and as director, Management Analysis Group. He earned the Legion of Merit for his service during the latter two assignments, and was promoted to brigadier general on October 18, 1968.

=== Vietnam War ===
Ordered to South Vietnam in February 1969, BGen Jaskilka served as assistant division commander, 1st Marine Division, and CG, Task Force Yankee. In August 1969, he was reassigned duty as J-3, Operations, Military Assistance Command, Vietnam (MACV). He was awarded the Distinguished Service Medal for his Vietnam service.

=== 1970s: Assistant Commandant ===
General Jaskilka returned to the United States in August 1970, and reported to Quantico, where he served as director, Command and Staff College, then as deputy for development/director. Development Center, Marine Corps Development and Education Command.

Following his promotion to major general in August 1972, he became assistant chief of staff, G-1, Headquarters Marine Corps. He served in this capacity until his transfer in July 1973, to Camp Lejeune, where he served as commanding general, 2nd Marine Division. He was promoted to lieutenant general on January 2, 1974, and was assigned as deputy chief of staff for manpower at Headquarters Marine Corps.

He remained in that position until July 1, 1975, when he was named Assistant Commandant of the Marine Corps. While serving in that capacity, General Jaskilka was advanced to the grade of general, to rank from March 4, 1976. He retired on June 30, 1978, after thirty-six years of service.

=== Memberships ===
Ukrainian American Veterans, Post 23, Buffalo, NY

== Death ==
Jaskilka died on January 15, 2012, at the age of 92 of pneumonia. His funeral was held on January 26, 2012; he was buried at Arlington National Cemetery.

== Awards and decorations ==
General Jaskilka holds the following personal decorations:

Navy Distinguished Service Medal		Silver Star with one gold award star	
Legion of Merit	Bronze Star w/ valor device	Joint Service Commendation Medal w/ 1 oak leaf cluster	Navy Presidential Unit Citation w/ 2 service stars
Meritorious Unit Citation	American Defense Service Medal	American Campaign Medal	Asiatic-Pacific Campaign Medal w/ 9 service stars
World War II Victory Medal	National Defense Service Medal w/ 1 service star	Korean Service Medal w/ 3 service stars	Vietnam Service Medal w/ 6 service stars
Order of National Security Merit (Republic of Korea), Gukseon Medal	National Order of Vietnam, Knight	Vietnam Army Distinguished Service Order, 1st Class	Korean Presidential Unit Citation
Vietnam Gallantry Cross unit citation	Philippine Liberation Medal w/ 1 service star	United Nations Korea Medal	Vietnam Campaign Medal

=== First Silver Star citation ===
Citation:

The President of the United States of America takes pleasure in presenting the Silver Star to Captain Samuel Jaskilka (MCSN: 0-13973), United States Marine Corps, for conspicuous gallantry and intrepidity as Commanding Officer of Company E, Second Battalion, Fifth Marines, FIRST Marine Division (Reinforced), in action against enemy aggressor forces in Korea on 17 September 1950. After successfully taking his company objective on an airfield, Captain Jaskilka boldly exposed himself to intense hostile fire in order to organize and control the various elements of the company and, by his skillful and inspiring leadership, was instrumental in preparing the men to meet and repel a pre-dawn enemy attack on their positions. Expertly continuing his direction, he led a strong daylight counterattack which virtually destroyed the remainder of the hostile force and paved the way for a rapid advance. Captain Jaskilka's aggressive determination, outstanding courage and staunch devotion to duty in the face of grave personal risk were in keeping with the highest traditions of the United States Naval Service.

=== Second Silver Star citation ===
Citation:

The President of the United States of America takes pleasure in presenting a Gold Star in lieu of a Second Award of the Silver Star to Captain Samuel Jaskilka (MCSN: 0-13973), United States Marine Corps, for conspicuous gallantry and intrepidity as Commanding Officer of Company E, Second Battalion, Fifth Marines, FIRST Marine Division (Reinforced), in action against enemy aggressor forces in Korea from 27 November to 10 December 1950. Exhibiting outstanding courage and sound tactical knowledge, Captain Jaskilka skillfully led his company in the withdrawal from the Chosin Reservoir area. When his unit was attacked by an enemy force estimated at battalion strength during the night of 27 November, he directed his men in repulsing the attack, accounting for over three hundred enemy killed. Despite sub-zero temperatures and the critical military situation, he repeatedly exposed himself to heavy hostile grenade, small arms and automatic weapons fire throughout the entire period to lead his men in repulsing constant assaults by a fanatical enemy seeking to split the column. By his forceful and determined leadership, great personal valor and inspiring devotion to duty, Captain Jaskilka contributed materially to the success of the withdrawal and to the infliction of hundreds of casualties upon the enemy. His heroic actions were in keeping with the highest traditions of the United States Naval Service.

=== Bronze Star citation ===
Citation:

The President of the United States of America takes pleasure in presenting the Bronze Star Medal with Combat "V" (Army Award) to Captain Samuel Jaskilka (MCSN: 0-13973), United States Marine Corps, for heroism while serving as a member of the 5th Marines, 1st Provisional Marine Brigade, in action against the enemy during the period 17 August to 6 September 1950. Captain Jaskilka, while serving as Company Commander of Company E during the 1st and 2d battles of the Naktong River, demonstrated outstanding qualities of leadership, sound professional ability and tenacity of purpose. He courageously led his company in the assault on enemy held position and through his inspirational leadership, his company was able to decisively defeat the enemy on both occasions. His heroic actions and steadfast devotion to duty constantly inspired his company to greater efforts and contributed materially to the success achieved by his battalion. The personal bravery and aggressive leadership of Captain Jaskilka reflect great credit on himself and the United States Naval Service.

== See also ==
- List of United States Marine Corps four-star generals
- Commandant of the Marine Corps

Military offices
Preceded by Earl E. Anderson	Assistant Commandant of the Marine Corps; 1975–1978	Succeeded by Robert H. Barrow
