= Pete Gudauskas =

American football player (1916–2003)

No. 3, 29, 17
- Position: Guard

Personal information
- Born: October 19, 1916; Georgetown, Illinois, U.S.
- Died: October 27, 2003 (aged 87); Fairfield, Ohio, U.S.
- Listed height: 6 ft 2 in (1.88 m)
- Listed weight: 222 lb (101 kg)

Career information
- High school: Georgetown Township
- College: Murray State
- NFL draft: 1940: undrafted

Career history
- Cleveland Rams (1940); Cincinnati Bengals (1940–1941); Chicago Bears (1943–1945)

Awards and highlights
- NFL champion (1943); Second-team Little All-American (1938)

Career NFL statistics
- Games played: 25
- Games started: 13
- Stats at Pro Football Reference

Peter Gudauskas (October 19, 1916 – October 27, 2003) was an American professional football guard who played four seasons in the National Football League (NFL) with the Cleveland Rams and Chicago Bears, and two seasons in the American Football League (AFL) with the Cincinnati Bengals. He played college football at Murray State Teachers College.

== Early life ==
Peter Gudauskas was born on October 19, 1916, in Georgetown, Illinois, and attended Georgetown Township High School.

== College career ==
Gudauskas played for the Murray State Racers from 1936 to 1939. In 1938, he was named to the Little All-America and All-Southern Intercollegiate Athletic Association teams. He was also named to the All-Kentucky Intercollegiate Athletic Conference team in 1937, 1938 and 1939. Gudauskas was inducted into the Murray State Athletics Hall of Fame in 1970.

== Professional career ==
Gudauskas played in one game for the Cleveland Rams in 1940, two seasons for the Cincinnati Bengals in 1940 and 1941 and two seasons for the Chicago Bears from 1943 to 1945.

== Later life ==
Gudauskas died on October 27, 2003, in Fairfield, Ohio.
