= Tipton, Oklahoma =

- Town
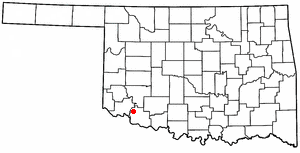
- Location of Tipton, Oklahoma
- Coordinates: 34°30′03″N 99°08′11″W
- Country: United States
- State: Oklahoma
- County: Tillman

Area
  - Total: 1.17 sq mi (3.03 km^{2})
  - Land: 1.17 sq mi (3.03 km^{2})
  - Water: 0 sq mi (0.00 km^{2})
- Elevation: 1,306 ft (398 m)

Population (2020)
  - Total: 864
  - Density: 738/sq mi (284.8/km^{2})
- Time zone: UTC-6 (Central (CST))
  - Summer (DST): UTC-5 (CDT)
- ZIP code: 73570
- Area code: 580
- FIPS code: 40-73850
- GNIS feature ID: 2413393

Tipton is a town in the western part of Tillman County, Oklahoma, United States. As of the 2020 census, Tipton had a population of 864.

Tipton also is home to Tipton Home, originally called Tipton Orphans' Home, a home for children, established in 1921, when Sol and Maggie Tipton donated a plot of land in Canadian, Texas to the founders. The Tipton Church of Christ moved the home to Tipton in 1924, where it still operated into the 21st century.

== History ==
The community was originally called Farmersville, but the name was changed to Stinson, honoring W. A. Stinson who owned the townsite. He sold the site to investors from Elk City. The town moved in 1909 to a location closer to the newly-laid Wichita Falls and Northwestern Railway (acquired by the Missouri, Kansas and Texas Railway in 1911). The townspeople voted to change the name again to Tipton, honoring John J. Tipton, conductor of the first train to pass through the area. A town plat was filed on July 29, 1909, and a post office was opened on September 18, 1909. The population was 441 in 1910.

During World War II, the U.S. government built a prisoner-of-war (POW) camp outside of town to house German soldiers.

On November 7, 2011, an EF4 tornado struck within the vicinity of the town. It was the first violent tornado to occur in the month of November in Oklahoma state history.

On May 16, 2015, the town was nearly hit by a violent wedge tornado.

Although Tipton lies in a hot, dry area, the soil of the area around the town is rich and, with the coming of irrigation, proved quite suited to growing cotton. The town economy has been based on serving the local agricultural industry. The population grew until it hit a peak in 1940, then dropped until 1960, when it dipped to 1117. It rose again to an all-time peak of 1475 in 1980, and has since fallen backward again.

== Geography ==
According to the United States Census Bureau, the town has a total area of 0.6 square miles (1.6 km^{2}), all land.

Tipton lies on the northern portion of the Tillman Terrace Aquifer, an alluvial aquifer in western Tillman County, associated with the southern extent of the North Fork of the Red River. The farmland surrounding Tipton is noted for high-quality soils. "Tipton loam" is considered to be among the most ideal soils in the United States. Much of the farmland is devoted to irrigated cotton. Other crops include alfalfa, silage corn, and wheat. Truck crops were grown in this area until the 1950s and have made a recent comeback.

On June 27, 1994, Tipton tied the record for the hottest temperature ever recorded for Oklahoma, at 120 °F (49 °C).

== Demographics ==
Historical population
| Census | Pop. | Note | %± |
|---|---|---|---|
| 1910 | 441 | | — |
| 1920 | 727 | | 64.9% |
| 1930 | 1,459 | | 100.7% |
| 1940 | 1,470 | | 0.8% |
| 1950 | 1,172 | | −20.3% |
| 1960 | 1,117 | | −4.7% |
| 1970 | 1,206 | | 8.0% |
| 1980 | 1,475 | | 22.3% |
| 1990 | 1,043 | | −29.3% |
| 2000 | 1,238 | | 18.7% |
| 2010 | 847 | | −31.6% |
| 2020 | 864 | | 2.0% |
U.S. Decennial Census

=== 2020 census ===
As of the 2020 census, Tipton had a population of 864. The median age was 41.1 years. 26.2% of residents were under the age of 18 and 21.3% of residents were 65 years of age or older. For every 100 females there were 99.1 males, and for every 100 females age 18 and over there were 98.1 males age 18 and over.

0.0% of residents lived in urban areas, while 100.0% lived in rural areas.

There were 352 households in Tipton, of which 29.8% had children under the age of 18 living in them. Of all households, 42.0% were married-couple households, 23.0% were households with a male householder and no spouse or partner present, and 29.0% were households with a female householder and no spouse or partner present. About 35.6% of all households were made up of individuals and 17.3% had someone living alone who was 65 years of age or older.

There were 463 housing units, of which 24.0% were vacant. The homeowner vacancy rate was 2.4% and the rental vacancy rate was 11.6%.

Racial composition as of the 2020 census
| Race | Number | Percent |
|---|---|---|
| White | 587 | 67.9% |
| Black or African American | 69 | 8.0% |
| American Indian and Alaska Native | 18 | 2.1% |
| Asian | 2 | 0.2% |
| Native Hawaiian and Other Pacific Islander | 0 | 0.0% |
| Some other race | 77 | 8.9% |
| Two or more races | 111 | 12.8% |
| Hispanic or Latino (of any race) | 203 | 23.5% |

=== 2000 census ===
As of the 2000 census, the average household size was 2.31, and the average family size was 2.87.

The median income for a household in the town was $24,432, and for a family was $30,735. Males had a median income of $27,353 versus $19,375 for females. The per capita income for the town was $12,217. About 14.1% of families and 19.3% of the population were below the poverty line, including 20.6% of those under age 18 and 19.4% of those age 65 or over.
