= Tony Ippolito =

American football player (1917–1951)

No. 82
- Position: Guard

Personal information
- Born: September 19, 1917; Chicago, Illinois, U.S.
- Died: November 12, 1951 (aged 34); Evanston, Wyoming, U.S.
- Listed height: 5 ft 10 in (1.78 m)
- Listed weight: 220 lb (100 kg)

Career information
- High school: St. Ignatius (Chicago)
- College: Purdue (1935–1938)
- NFL draft: 1939: 7th round, 54th overall pick

Career history
- St. Louis Gunners (1939); Chicago Cardinals (1940)*; Chicago Gunners (1940); Chicago Bears (1943)
- * Offseason or practice squad member only

Awards and highlights
- NFL champion (1943)

Career NFL statistics
- Games played: 9
- Interceptions: 1
- Stats at Pro Football Reference

Anthony Samuel Ippolito (September 19, 1917 – November 12, 1951) was an American professional football guard who played one season with the Chicago Bears of the National Football League (NFL). He was selected by the Philadelphia Eagles in the seventh round of the 1939 NFL draft after playing college football at Purdue University.

== Early life and college ==
Anthony Samuel Ippolito was born on September 19, 1917, in Chicago, Illinois. He attended St. Ignatius College Prep in Chicago.

Ippolito played college football for the Purdue Boilermakers of Purdue University. He was on the freshman team in 1935. He was a letterman in 1936 and 1938.

== Professional career ==
Ippolito was selected by the Philadelphia Eagles in the seventh round, with the 54th overall pick, of the 1939 NFL draft. However, he did not sign with the Eagles.

Ippolito signed with the St. Louis Gunners of the American Professional Football Association on October 25, 1939.

Ippolito signed with the Chicago Cardinals of the NFL on August 2, 1940. He was later released.

Ippolito played for the independent Chicago Gunners during the 1940 season.

He played in nine games for the Chicago Bears of the NFL in 1943 and recorded one interception. He also played in the 1943 NFL Championship Game, a 41–21 victory over the Washington Redskins.

== Personal life ==
Ippolito served in the United States Army during World War II as a medical officer in the 102nd Infantry Regiment. He graduated from the Loyola School of Medicine and became an orthopedic surgeon in Chicago.

On November 12, 1951, in Evanston, Wyoming, Ippolito and his wife died in the train collision between the City of Los Angeles and City of San Francisco.
