= Joe Vodicka =

American football player (1921–1995)

No. 48, 20
- Position: Halfback

Personal information
- Born: March 4, 1921; Chicago, Illinois, U.S.
- Died: February 28, 1995 (aged 73); Chicago, Illinois, U.S.
- Listed height: 5 ft 10 in (1.78 m)
- Listed weight: 189 lb (86 kg)

Career information
- High school: Lane Tech (Chicago)
- College: Illinois State

Career history
- Chicago Bears (1943, 1945); Chicago Cardinals (1945)

Awards and highlights
- NFL champion (1943)
- Stats at Pro Football Reference

Joseph J. Vodicka (March 4, 1921 – February 28, 1995) was an American professional football halfback who played two seasons in the National Football League (NFL) with the Chicago Bears and Chicago Cardinals. He played college football at Illinois State University.

== Early life and college ==
Joseph J. Vodicka was born on March 4, 1921, in Chicago, Illinois. He attended Lane Technical College Prep High School in Chicago. He suffered a serious injury while in high school in 1938. Vodicka was told by doctors that he would have a limp for the rest of his life. However, he later fully recovered.

Vodicka played college football for the Illinois State Normal Redbirds of Illinois State Normal University.

== Professional career ==
Vodicka signed with the Chicago Bears in 1943. He played in three games for the Bears during the 1943 season but did not record any statistics. He had one rushing attempt for three yards in the 1943 NFL Championship Game victory over the Washington Redskins. Vodicka then served in the United States Navy during World War II and played for the 1944 Camp Peary Pirates football team. He returned to the Bears in 1945, appearing in four games while starting two.

Vodicka finished the 1945 season with the Chicago Cardinals. He played in four games, starting one, for the Cardinals that year, recording three carries for negative one yard, one reception for three yards, four punt returns for nine yards, and one kick return for 20 yards.

== Personal life ==
Vodicka died on February 28, 1985, in Chicago.
