= Dante Magnani =

American football player (1917–1985)

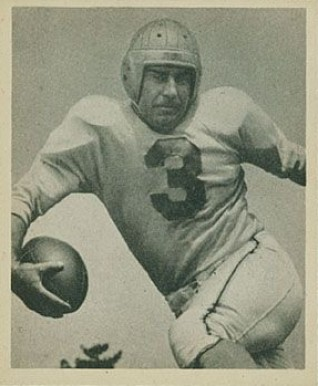
- Magnani on a 1948 Bowman football card

No. 8, 24, 69, 3, 4, 16
- Positions: Halfback, Wingback

Personal information
- Born: March 16, 1917; Dalzell, Illinois, U.S.
- Died: December 22, 1985 (aged 68); Vallejo, California, U.S.
- Listed height: 5 ft 10 in (1.78 m)
- Listed weight: 182 lb (83 kg)

Career information
- High school: Saint Mary's (Berkeley, California)
- College: Saint Mary's (CA) (1936-1939)
- NFL draft: 1940: 19th round, 175th overall pick

Career history
- Cleveland Rams (1940–1942); Chicago Bears (1943. 1946); Los Angeles Rams (1947–1948); Chicago Bears (1949); Detroit Lions (1950)

Awards and highlights
- 2× NFL champion (1943, 1946); Pro Bowl (1942)

Career NFL statistics
- Rushing yards: 1,466
- Rushing average: 4.4
- Receptions: 79
- Receiving yards: 942
- Total touchdowns: 15
- Stats at Pro Football Reference

Dante Alfred Magnani (March 16, 1917 – December 23, 1985) was an American professional football halfback who played nine seasons in the National Football League (NFL) for the Cleveland Rams (1940–1942), Chicago Bears (1943, 1946, 1949), Los Angeles Rams (1947–1948), and Detroit Lions (1950). He was chosen to play in the Pro Bowl in 1942 and ranked among the NFL's statistical leaders in 1942 and 1943.

Magnani also played service football for the 1944 Bainbridge Commodores football team and college football for the St. Mary's College from 1936 to 1939.

== Early life ==
Magnani was born in 1917 in Dalzell, Illinois. As a child, he moved with his family to Vallejo, California. He attended St. Mary's Prepareatory School and then enrolled at St. Mary's College in Moraga, California. He played college football for the St. Mary's Gaels football team from 1936 to 1939. He was a member of the 1938 Saint Mary's Gaels football team that defeated Texas Tech in the Cotton Bowl.

== Professional football ==
Magnani was selected by the Cleveland Rams in the 19th round, 175th overall pick, of the 1940 NFL draft. He played three seasons in Cleveland from 1940 to 1942. In 1942, he was selected for the Pro Bowl and ranked among the NFL leaders with 24 receptions (third) for 276 yards and four receiving touchdowns (fourth), 620 yards from scrimmage (fifth), 897 all-purpose yards (seventh), 344 rushing yards (eighth), and five touchdowns (ninth).

In April 1943, the Rams withdrew from the NFL, and Magnani joined the Chicago Bears for the 1943 season. He again ranked among the NFL leaders with a 79-yard rush (first), 6.1 rushing yards per attempt (second), a 96-yard kick return (second), and 310 rushing yards (10th).

After the 1943 season, Magnani entered the Navy. He missed the 1944 and 1945 NFL seasons due to military service. During the 1944 season, he played for the undefeated 1944 Bainbridge Commodores football team that was ranked No. 5 in the final AP Poll.

Magnani returned to the Chicago Bears for the 1946 season. He tallied 277 rushing yards and 156 receiving yards in 1946. His average of 5.6 yards per touch ranked fifth in the NFL.

In January 1947, the Bears sold Magnani to the Los Angeles Rams. He spent the 1947 and 1948 seasons with the Rams.

Magnani concluded his NFL career with the Chicago Bears in 1949 and the Detroit Lions in 1950. He was used primarily as a blocker and defensive player by the Lions and was waived by the club in August 1951.

According to the Oxford English Dictionary the first known use of the word scatback was in reference to Magnani.

== NFL career statistics ==
Legend
	Won the NFL Championship
	Led the league
**Bold**	Career high

=== Regular season ===
Year	Team	Games		Rushing					Receiving				
Year	Team	GP	GS	Att	Yds	Avg	Lng	TD	Rec	Yds	Avg	Lng	TD
1940	RAM	11	4	7	19	2.7	-	0	11	119	10.8	25	1
1941	RAM	9	8	24	128	5.3	29	0	14	189	13.5	61	1
1942	RAM	11	10	59	**344**	5.8	71	1	**24**	**276**	11.5	**67**	**4**
1943	CHI	10	7	51	310	**6.1**	**79**	**2**	6	88	**14.7**	51	1
1946	CHI	10	7	**68**	277	4.1	32	0	14	156	11.1	38	1
1947	RAM	12	3	48	178	3.7	27	0	4	57	14.3	40	1
1948	RAM	8	1	38	144	3.8	15	0	3	28	9.3	16	1
1949	CHI	6	1	33	59	1.8	9	0	3	29	9.7	15	0
1950	DET	7	0	3	7	2.3	5	0	0	0	0.0	0	0
		84	41	331	1,466	4.4	79	3	79	942	11.9	67	10

=== Playoffs ===
Year	Team	Games		Rushing					Receiving				
Year	Team	GP	GS	Att	Yds	Avg	Lng	TD	Rec	Yds	Avg	Lng	TD
1943	CHI	1	1	**2**	**6**	**3.0**	-	0	**4**	**122**	**30.5**	**66**	**2**
1946	CHI	1	1	0	0	0.0	-	0	0	0	0.0	0	0
		2	2	2	6	3.0	-	0	4	122	30.5	66	2

== Later life ==
In 1952, Magnani returned to Vallejo, California, where he operated a beer distribution business. He retired in 1982. He was also an organizer of the NFL Alumni Association. was inducted into the St. Mary's Athletic Hall of Fame. He died on December 26, 1985, at age 68 from congestive heart failiure at his home in Vallejo.
