= Harry Thayer (American football executive) =

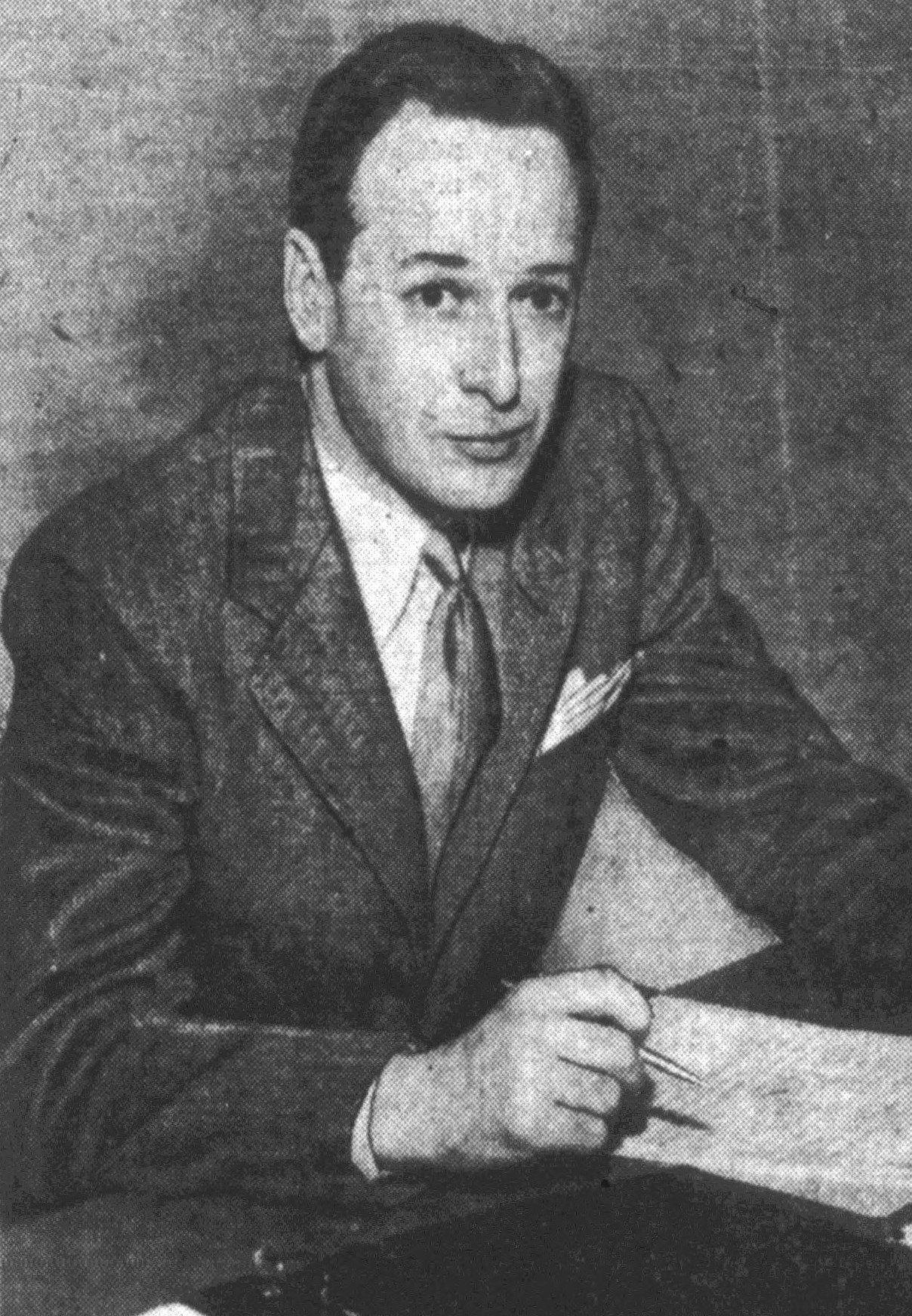
- Thayer, circa 1947

Personal information
- Born: December 23, 1907; Dannemora, New York, U.S.
- Died: January 28, 1980 (aged 72); Kingston, New York, U.S.

Career information
- College: Middlebury College

Career history
- Philadelphia Eagles (1941–1946) General manager; Los Angeles Dons (1947–1949) General manager
- Executive profile at Pro Football Reference

Harry M. Thayer (December 23, 1907 – January 28, 1980) was an American football executive who served as general manager for the Philadelphia Eagles of the National Football League (NFL) from 1941 to 1946, and for the Los Angeles Dons of the All-America Football Conference (AAFC) from 1947 to 1949.

A native of Dannemora, New York, Thayer attended Middlebury College in Vermont. In 1941, he was appointed general manager of the Philadelphia Eagles in the National Football League (NFL). He served in that position for six years, from 1941 until his resignation following the 1946 season. He was replaced by Al Ennis.

Ten days after resigning with the Eagles, Thayer accepted an offer from the Los Angeles Dons, in the rival All-America Football Conference (AAFC), to be their manager. He served as the Dons manager for three seasons, until the team folded in 1950.

Thayer started the Ellenville Press, a weekly newspaper, in 1950. He was owner and publisher of the paper until 1959. He was named general manager of the WGHQ radio station in 1959, and became its president in 1962. He assumed presidency of the Herald Review Radio, Inc., which owned four other radio stations, three years later.

Thayer died on January 28, 1980, in the Kingston, New York, Hospital. He was 72 years old at the time of his death.
