= Ted Lapka =

American football player (1920–2011)

No. 45
- Position: End

Personal information
- Born: April 20, 1920; Hawthorne, Illinois
- Died: December 1, 2011 (aged 91)

Career information
- College: DePaul; St. Ambrose

Career history
- 1943–1944, 1946: Washington Redskins

Theodore Aloysius Lapka (April 20, 1920 – December 1, 2011) was an American football end in the National Football League for the Washington Redskins. He was born in Hawthorne, Illinois. He attended DePaul University and St. Ambrose University He had one receiving touchdown and missed the 1945 season while fighting in World War II..
