= Connie Mack Berry =

American basketball and football player (1915–1980)

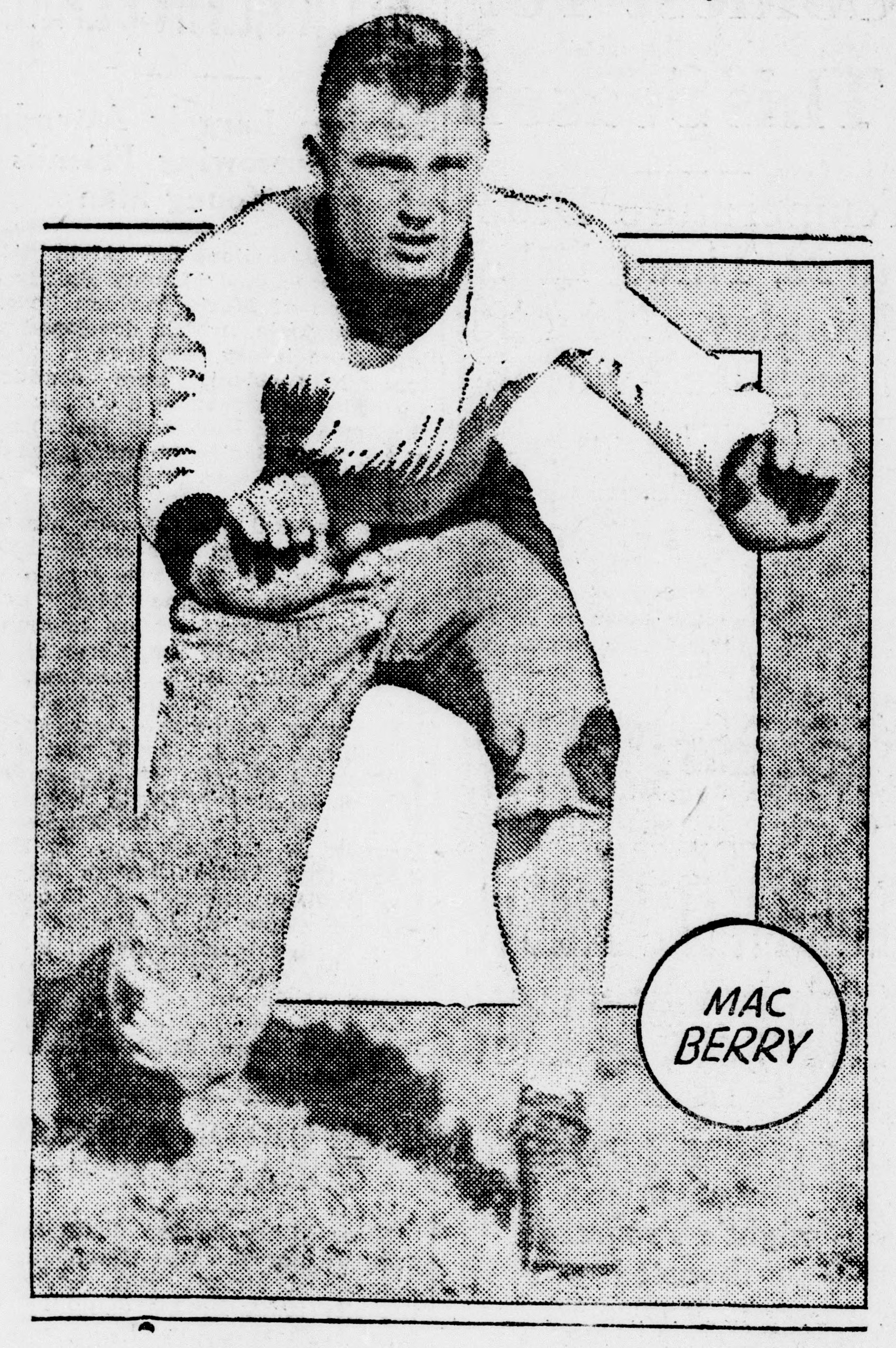
- Berry, circa 1936

No. 83, 37, 6, 2, 23, 54
- Position: End

Personal information
- Born: April 15, 1915; Greenville, South Carolina, U.S.
- Died: June 24, 1980 (aged 65); Fayetteville, North Carolina, U.S.
- Listed height: 6 ft 3 in (1.91 m)
- Listed weight: 215 lb (98 kg)

Career information
- High school: Parker (Greenville)
- College: NC State (1934-1937)
- NFL draft: 1939: undrafted

Career history
- Detroit Lions (1939); Green Bay Packers (1940); New York Yankees (1940); Cleveland Rams (1940); Milwaukee Chiefs (1941); Chicago Bears (1942–1946); Chicago Rockets (1947)

Awards and highlights
- 2× NFL champion (1943, 1946)

Career NFL/AAFC statistics
- Receptions: 46
- Receiving yards: 783
- Receiving touchdowns: 8
- Stats at Pro Football Reference

Connie Mack Berry (April 15, 1915 – June 24, 1980) was an American who played professional football, baseball, and basketball.

Berry was the center for North Carolina State University's basketball team from 1936 to 1938. He led the Southern Conference in scoring in 1936 and 1937 and won all-conference honors in each of the three years he played. Berry was also a member of NCSU's football team from 1936 to 1938 and baseball team in 1936 and 1937.

After graduation, Berry went on to play for the Oshkosh All-Stars (1939–44) and Chicago American Gears (1944–46) of the National Basketball League. Berry played in the National Football League (NFL) starting in 1939 with the Detroit Lions. In 1940, he played for the Green Bay Packers and the Cleveland Rams. From 1942 to 1946, Berry played with the Chicago Bears. He also spent two years in the Chicago Cubs' minor league organization.
