= Hampton Pool =

Pool in London, England

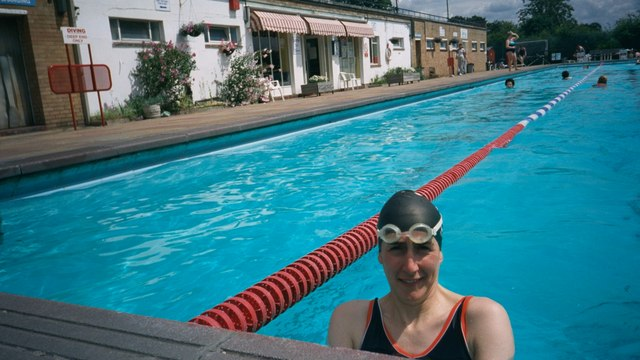
- Interactive map of Hampton Pool
- Location: High Street, Hampton, London, TW12 2ST
- Coordinates: 51.418308°N 0.357941°W
- Operator: Hampton Pool Trust
- Type: open-air, heated
- Dimensions: Length: 36 metres (118 ft); Width: 14 metres (46 ft)

Construction
- Opened: 1922

Website
- hamptonpool.co.uk

Hampton Pool is a heated open air pool or lido in Hampton in the London Borough of Richmond upon Thames. It is unusual for being open 365 days of the year. It is currently managed by YMCA St Paul's Group.

== Description ==
The pool is 36 by 14 metres (118 ft × 46 ft). There is also a small 12-by-7-metre (39 ft × 23 ft) pool for children.

Other facilities include a gym, fitness-studio and cafeteria.

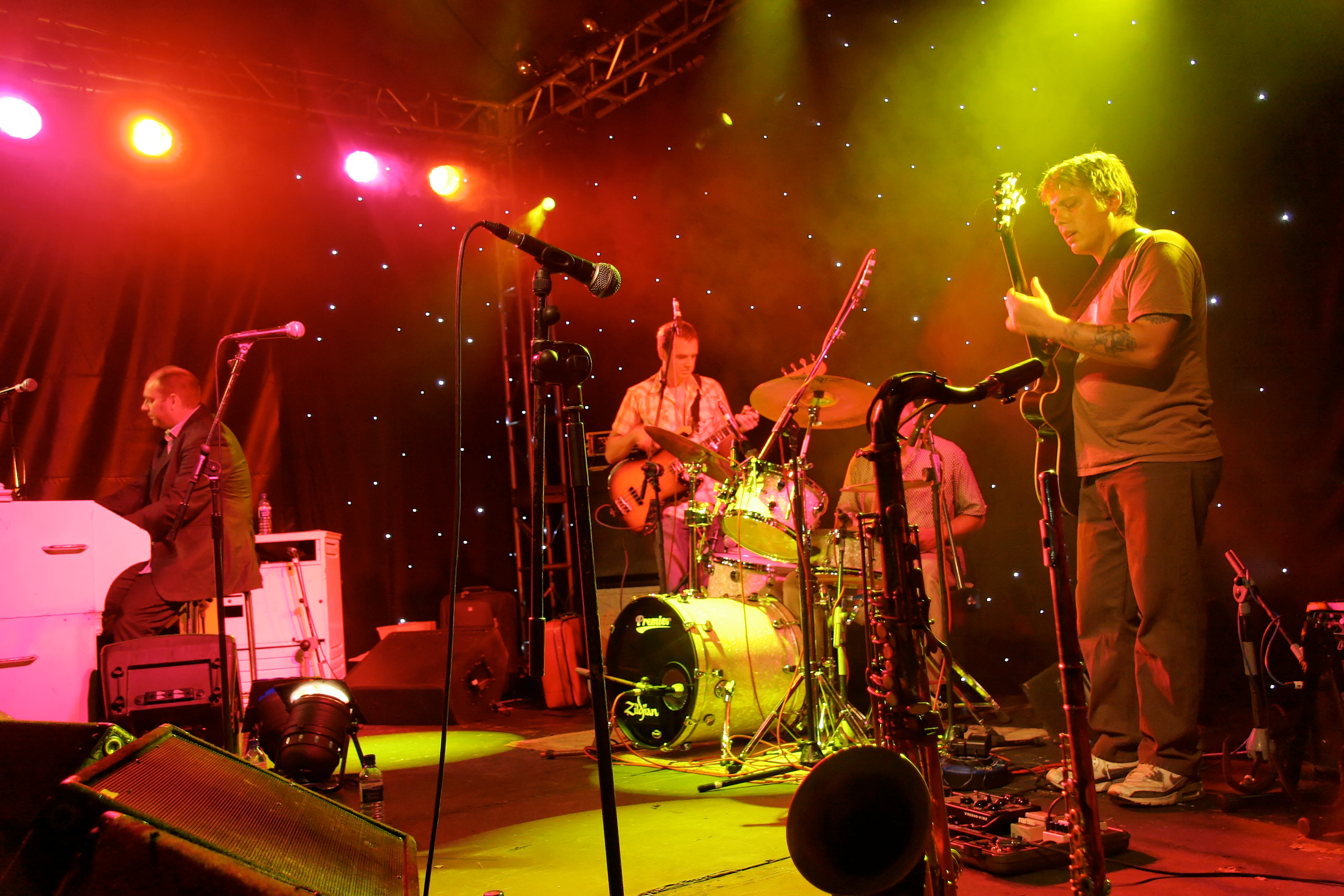
The James Taylor Quartet performing at Hampton Pool

It is operated by the Hampton Pool Trust, a registered charity (number 294117) and not-for-profit company (number 01870925). It is managed by YMCA St Paul's Group on behalf of the Trust. The Trust's fund-raising activities also include summer open-air concerts.

== History ==
The lido was built in 1922 after plans approved in 1914 were delayed due to the outbreak of the First World War.

In 1939 a diving pit and filtration system was added. Further improvements in 1961 included widening the pool, and adding a new building and a car park.

By 1980 Richmond Council decided to close the lido for financial reasons. After local community campaigning, in which over £60,000 was raised, the pool was reopened in 1985. The management of the pool was transferred to Hampton Pool Ltd, a company created by the campaign group.
