= 1943 NFL Championship Game =

Coordinates: 41.948°N 87.656°W

Washington Redskins (Eastern) (6–3–1)	Chicago Bears (Western) (8–1–1)
21	41
Head coach: Dutch Bergman	Head coach: Hunk Anderson Luke Johnsos
	1	2	3	4	Total
WAS	0	7	7	7	21
CHI	0	14	13	14	41
- Date: December 26, 1943
- Stadium: Wrigley Field; Chicago, Illinois
- Favorite: Chicago by 7 points
- Referee: Ronald Gibbs
- Attendance: 34,320

Radio in the United States
- Network: Mutual
- Announcers: Harry Wismer

Location in the United States

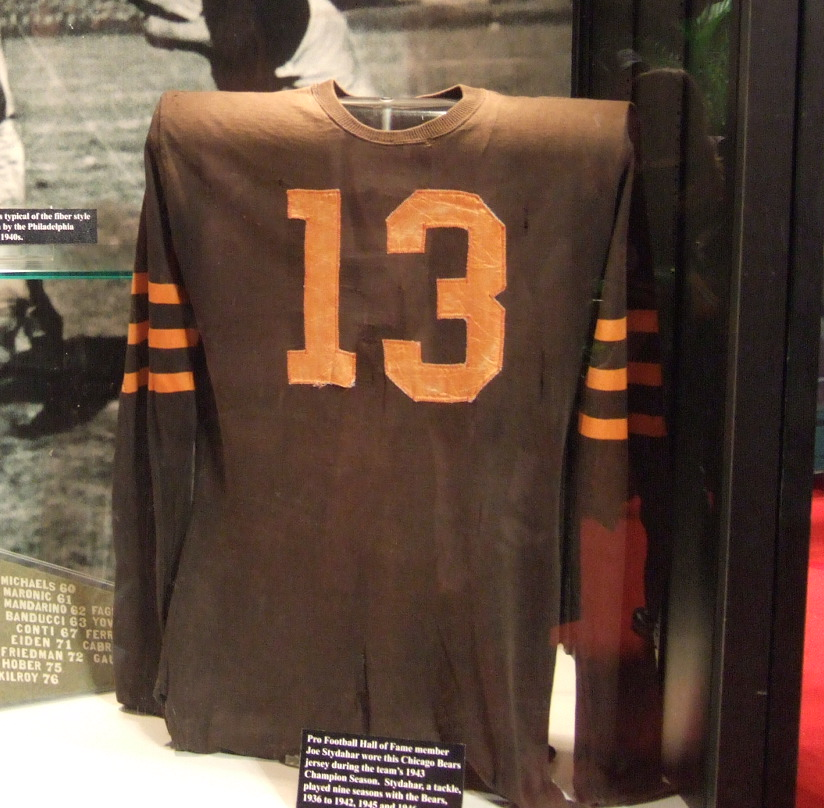
Joe Stydahar's Chicago Bears uniform worn during the team's 1943 championship season.

The 1943 NFL Championship Game was the 11th annual title game of the National Football League (NFL), held at Wrigley Field in Chicago on December 26 with an attendance of 34,320. In a rematch of the previous year's game, the Western Division champion Chicago Bears (8–1–1) met the Eastern Division champion Washington Redskins (6–3–1). The previous week, the Redskins had defeated the New York Giants at the Polo Grounds in a playoff game by a score of 28–0 to determine the champs of the east, after the teams ended the regular season with identical records. The Redskins had dropped their final three regular season games, including two to the Giants. Even though the Giants had swept the season series with Washington, the rules of the time called for a tiebreaker game (division tiebreaker games were eliminated in 1967 with the development of divisional tiebreaking rules).

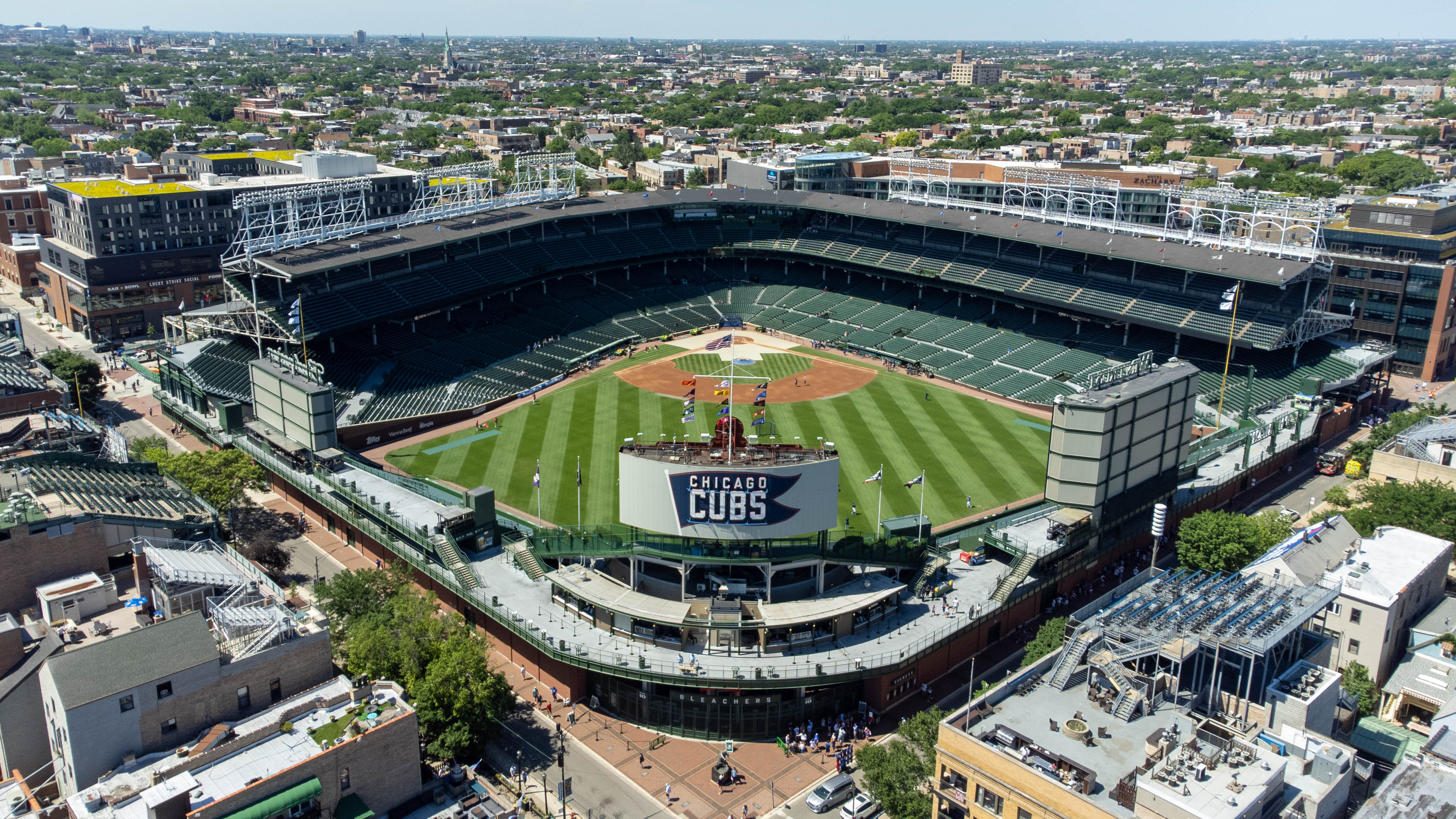
Wrigley Field in Chicago, site of the 1943 NFL Championship Game.

The divisional playoff game pushed the championship game back to its latest ever date, and the late-December Chicago weather caused the game to be dubbed the "Ice Bowl." The Bears were favored by a touchdown, and won by twenty points, 41–21. The crowd was smaller than the previous year's and well off the championship game record of 48,120 set in 1938, but the gross gate receipts of $120,500 set a record. In addition to the gate, radio broadcast rights to the game were sold for $5,000.

The Bears were led by quarterback Sid Luckman while Sammy Baugh was the quarterback for the Redskins. The Redskins were coached by Dutch Bergman. The Chicago win marked the franchise's third championship in four seasons, their fourth since the institution of the NFL Championship Game in 1933, and their sixth championship overall.

== Rosters ==
=== Starters ===
Starting lineups
Bears	Position	Redskins
Jim Benton	Left end	Bob Masterson
Dom Sigillo	Left tackle	Lou Rymkus
Dan Fortmann	Left guard	Clyde Shugart
Bulldog Turner	Center	George Smith
George Musso	Right guard	Steve Slivinski
Al Hoptowit	Right tackle	Joe Pasqua
George Wilson	Right end	Joe Aguirre
Sid Luckman	Quarterback	Ray Hare
Harry Clarke	Left halfback	George Cafego
Dante Magnani	Right halfback	Frank Seno
Bob Masters	Fullback	Andy Farkas

=== Substitutions ===
Bears substitutions: Pool, Berry, Steinkemper, Babartsky, Mundee, Ippolito, Logan, Matuza, McLean, Luckman, Famighetti, Nagurski, McEnulty, Nolting and Vodicka.

Redskins substitutions: Piasecky, Lapka, Wilkin, Zeno, Fiorentino, Leon, Hayden, Baugh, Seymour, Moore, Gibson, Akins and Stasica.

=== Officials ===
- Referee: Ronald Gibbs
- Umpire: John Kelly
- Head linesman: Charlie Berry
- Field judge: Eddie Tryon

The NFL had only four game officials in 1943; the back judge was added in 1947, the line judge in 1965, and the side judge in 1978.

== Scoring summary ==
Chicago Bears 41, Washington Redskins 21

Quarter	1	2	3	4	Total
Redskins	0	7	7	7	21
Bears	0	14	13	14	41

at Wrigley Field, Chicago, Illinois

- Date: December 26, 1943
- Game time: 2 p.m. CWT (CDT)
- Pro-Football-Reference.com

Game information
- First quarter
  - no scoring
- Second quarter
  - WAS – Andy Farkas 1-yard run (Bob Masterson kick). Redskins 7–0
  - CHI – Harry Clarke 31-yard pass from Sid Luckman (Bob Snyder kick). Tied 7–7
  - CHI – Bronko Nagurski 3-yard run (Snyder kick). Bears 14–7
- Third quarter
  - CHI – Dante Magnani 36-yard pass from Sid Luckman (Snyder kick). Bears 21–7
  - CHI – Dante Magnani 66-yard pass from Sid Luckman (kick failed). Bears 27–7
  - WAS – Andy Farkas 17-yard pass from Sammy Baugh (Masterson kick). Bears 27–14
- Fourth quarter
  - CHI – Jim Benton 26-yard pass from Sid Luckman (Snyder kick). Bears 34–14
  - CHI – Harry Clarke 10-yard pass from Sid Luckman (Snyder kick). Bears 41–14
  - WAS – Joe Aguirre 25-yard pass from Sammy Baugh (Aguirre kick). Bears 41–21

== Game statistics ==
Statistics	Chicago	Washington
First downs	12	11
Rushes–yards	44–168	27–45
Passing yards	276	182
Passes	14–27–0	10–22–4
Punt return yards	66	37
Punts	5–32	5–48.4
Kickoff return yards	21	167
Fumbles–lost	0–0	1–0
Penalties–yards	9–81	2–20

== Players' shares ==
Each player on the Bears took home $1,135 while each member of the Redskins got $754.

== See also ==
- 1943 NFL playoffs
