= Dom Sigillo =

American football player (1913–1957)

No. 64, 25, 32, 19, 52, 5
- Positions: Tackle, guard

Personal information
- Born: March 7, 1913; Storrs, Connecticut, U.S.
- Died: July 1, 1957 (aged 44); San Francisco, California, U.S.
- Listed height: 6 ft 0 in (1.83 m)
- Listed weight: 230 lb (104 kg)

Career information
- High school: Central (Columbus, Ohio)
- College: Xavier

Career history
- Cincinnati Models (1936); Cincinnati Bengals (1937–1938); Columbus Bullies/Bulls (1939–1941); Chicago Bears (1943–1944); Detroit Lions (1945); San Francisco Clippers (1947)

Awards and highlights
- NFL champion (1943)
- Stats at Pro Football Reference

Dominic Frederick Sigillo (March 7, 1913 – July 1, 1957) was an American professional football tackle who played three seasons in the National Football League (NFL) with the Chicago Bears and Detroit Lions. He played college football at Xavier University. He started for the Bears in the 1943 NFL Championship Game.

== Early life and college ==
Dominic Frederick Sigillo was born on March 7, 1913, in Storrs, Connecticut. He attended Central High School in Columbus, Ohio.

He was a member of the Xavier Musketeers freshman team in 1932 and a member of the main roster from 1933 to 1935.

== Professional career ==
Sigillo played in five games, all starts, for the Cincinnati Models of the Midwest Football League in 1936.

He played in five games for the Cincinnati Bengals of the American Football League in 1937, and in six games for the Bengals in 1938.

Sigillo appeared in seven games, starting four, for the Columbus Bullies of the American Professional Football Association in 1939. He played in ten games, starting five, for the Bullies in 1940. He played in seven games, starting two, for the newly-renamed Columbus Bulls during the 1941 season.

Sigillo was signed by the Chicago Bears of the National Football League (NFL) in 1943 and played in six games for the team during the 1943 NFL season. He also started for the Bears in the 1943 NFL Championship Game, a 41–21 victory against the Washington Redskins. He appeared in nine games, starting three, for the Bears in 1944.

On August 18, 1945, Sigillo was traded to the Detroit Lions. He played in eight games, starting two, for the Lions in 1945 before being released on November 19, 1945.

He started one game for the San Francisco Clippers of the Pacific Coast Professional Football League in 1947.

== Personal life ==
Sigillo died on July 1, 1957, in San Francisco, California.
