= 1945 Yanks season =

National Football League team season

- Head coach: Herb Kopf
- Home stadium: Fenway Park; Yankee Stadium

Results
- Record: 3–6–1
- Division place: 3rd (tied) NFL Eastern
- Playoffs: Did not qualify

The 1945 Yanks season was their second in the National Football League. They merged with the Brooklyn Tigers (who had previously been the Brooklyn Dodgers) for the season and played under the name Yanks. The team improved on their previous season's output of 2–8, winning three games. They failed to qualify for the playoffs for the second consecutive season. Four home games were played in Boston and the home game against the New York Giants was played at Yankee Stadium. The result of these two teams merging for a season is similar to the Steagles and Card-Pitt teams.

== Before the season ==
=== Brooklyn Tigers draftees ===
1945 Brooklyn Tigers draft
Round	Pick	Player	Position	College	Notes
1	3	Joe Renfroe	Back	Tulane	
2	13	Wayne Williams	Back	Minnesota	
3	17	Cecil Gray	Center	Oregon	
4	30	Steve Enich	Guard	Marquette	
5	34	Al Kowalski	Back	Tulsa	
6	44	Dick Barwegen *	Guard	Purdue	
7	57	Louie Futrell	Back	Fresno State	
8	67	John Dodds	Guard	California	
9	77	Elting Johnson	Back	Bucknell	
10	90	Roy Cross	End	Tennessee	
11	100	Earl Haury	Tackle	Kansas State	
12	110	John Martin	Back	East Tennessee State	
13	123	George McDonald	Tackle	South Carolina	
14	133	Hal Self	Back	Alabama	
15	143	Tom Reilly	Guard	Fordham	
16	156	Skimp Harrison	End	South Carolina	
17	166	Arnie Weinmeister * ^{†}	Tackle	Washington	
18	176	Charley Eikenberg	Quarterback	Rice	
19	189	Al Kasulin	Back	Villanova	
20	199	Charley Lively	Tackle	Arkansas	
21	209	Ted Curran	Back	Iowa	
22	222	Don Fabling	Back	Colorado	
23	232	Wally Crittenden	Back	USC	
24	242	Jules Taddie	Center	Rochester	
25	255	Jerry Whitney	Back	USC	
26	265	Felix Trapani	Guard	LSU	
27	275	Hal Finney	Back	USC	
28	288	Don Fauble	Back	Oklahoma	
29	298	Nick Studen	Back	Denver	
30	308	LaMar Dykstra	Back	Colorado	
† Pro Football Hall of Fame * Made at least one Pro Bowl during career

=== Boston Yanks draftees ===
1945 Boston Yanks draft
Round	Pick	Player	Position	College	Notes
1	4	Eddie Prokop	Back	Georgia Tech	
2	15	Tom Dean	Tackle	SMU	played with Yanks in 1946
3	20	Damon Tassos	Guard	Texas A&M	
4	31	Don Deeks	Tackle	Washington	
5	36	Johnny Strzykalski	Back	Marquette	
6	47	Jim Mello	Back	Notre Dame	played with Yanks in 1947
7	58	Marty Silovich	Center	Marquette	
8	69	Ellis Jones	Guard	Tulsa	
9	80	Earl Lambert	Back	Manhattan	
10	91	Don Kasprzak	Back	Dartmouth	
11	102	Ben Jones	End	Arkansas	
12	113	Herb Coleman	Center	Notre Dame	
13	124	Joe Pezelski	Back	Villanova	
14	135	John DiGangi	Tackle	Holy Cross	
15	146	Chan Highsmith	Center	North Carolina	
16	157	Mike Costello	End	Georgetown	
17	168	Paul Dromgoole	End	Manhattan	
18	179	Dolph Czekala	Tackle	Syracuse	
19	190	Joe Drumm	Tackle	Georgetown	
20	201	Mario Giannelli	Guard	Boston College	
21	212	Eric Jamison	Tackle	San Francisco	
22	223	Walt Kretz	Back	Cornell	
23	234	Marty Grbovaz	End	San Francisco	
24	245	Ziggy Gory	Center	Villanova	
25	256	Bill Iancelli	End	William & Mary	
26	267	Al Kull	Tackle	Fordham	
27	278	Bob Mangene	Back	Boston College	
28	289	John Morelli	Guard	Georgetown	Already on Yanks roster
29	300	John Fisher	Center	Harvard	
30	311	Elmer Oberto	Guard	Georgetown	
Made roster

== 1945 season ==
The Yanks started well with an win at Fenway Park over Pittsburgh, played on Tuesday, September 25, as both Boston baseball teams were at home over the weekend. (As of 2024, this is the last NFL game actually scheduled to be played on a Tuesday.) After a victory over eventual Eastern Division champion Washington, a tie with the Giants in Yankee Stadium and splitting two road games, the Yanks were 3–1–1, tied with the 3–1 Redskins atop the East (ties did not count in the standings then).

After that, it all came apart. After a tough 10–9 loss to Detroit at Fenway Park (Don Currivan caught a touchdown pass late in the fourth quarter only to watch the extra point attempt go awry), the Yanks were crushed in their final four contests, finding the end zone only three times while allowing a whopping 117 points. They finished 3–6–1, tied for third with New York.

Week	Date	Opponent	Result	Record	Venue
1	September 25	**Pittsburgh Steelers**	**W** 28–7	1–0	Fenway Park
2	Bye				
3	October 7	**Washington Redskins**	**W** 28–20	2–0	Fenway Park
4	October 14	**New York Giants**	**T** 13–13	2–0–1	Yankee Stadium
5	October 21	at Green Bay Packers	**L** 14–38	2–1–1	Wisconsin State Fair Park
6	October 28	at **Pittsburgh Steelers**	**W** 10–6	3–1–1	Forbes Field
7	November 4	Detroit Lions	**L** 9–10	3–2–1	Fenway Park
8	November 11	at **Washington Redskins**	**L** 7–34	3–3–1	Griffith Stadium
9	November 18	Green Bay Packers	**L** 0–28	3–4–1	Fenway Park
10	Bye				
11	December 2	at Cleveland Rams	**L** 7–20	3–5–1	League Park
12	December 9	at **Philadelphia Eagles**	**L** 7–35	3–6–1	Shibe Park
Note: Intra-division opponents are in **bold** text.

== Roster ==
1945 Boston Yanks final roster
Quarterbacks: 18 - Scott Gudmundson S/P; 31 - Ace Parker S/P; Backs: 10 - Bob Davis RB/QB/CB/S; 12 - Frank Sachse RB/CB; 19 - Hugh McCullough RB/CB/P; 21 - Ken Steinmetz FB/LB; 24 - Paul Duhart RB/CB; 25 - Pug Manders FB/LB; 29 - Babe Dimancheff RB/CB; 33 - Mike Micka FB/LB; 36 - John Grigas RB/CB; 37 - Ned Mathews CB/RB; Ends/Receivers: 14 - Keith Ranspot; 15 - Joe Crowley; 28 - Bob Masterson; 34 - Don Currivan	Linemen/Linebackers: 16 - John Morelli G/DG; 17 - Tony Leon G/DG; 20 - Jim Magee T/DT; 27 - Ellis Jones G/DG; 30 - Lou Mark C/LB; 35 - Al Fiorentino G/DG; 38 - George Doherty T/DT; 41 - Augie Lio G/DG/K; 40 - Edward McGee T/G/DT; 42 - Floyd Rhea G/DG/T/DT; 43 - George Smith C/LB; 44 - George Sergienko T/DT; 45 - Don Deeks T/DT; rookies in italics

== Standings ==
NFL Eastern Division
	W	L	T	PCT	DIV	PF	PA	STK
Washington Redskins	8	2	0	.800	6–2	209	121	W2
Philadelphia Eagles	7	3	0	.700	5–2	272	133	W1
Yanks	3	6	1	.333	3–2–1	123	211	L5
New York Giants	3	6	1	.333	2–4–1	179	198	L1
Pittsburgh Steelers	2	8	0	.200	1–7	79	220	L3

Note: Tie games were not officially counted in the standings until 1972.
