= 1944 Boston Yanks season =

National Football League team season

- Owner: Ted Collins
- Head coach: Herb Kopf
- Home stadium: Fenway Park

Results
- Record: 2–8
- Division place: 4th NFL Eastern
- Playoffs: Did not qualify

The 1944 Boston Yanks season was its inaugural season in the National Football League. The team won two games and failed to qualify for the playoffs.

== Pre-season ==
=== 1944 NFL draft ===
The 1944 NFL draft was held on April 19, 1944, at the Warwick Hotel in Philadelphia. By agreement of league owners, the new Yanks franchise received the first pick of the first round and then dropped to 11th in the order of draft selection, making their next choice at 27.

Although there were 32 rounds in the 1944 draft, each of the league's 11 teams selected 30 players, for a total of 330 players picked. The five worst-finishing teams of the 1943 season picked alone in rounds 2 and 4, while the five best-finishing teams plus the expansion Yanks picked alone in rounds 31 and 32.

Boston's top draft pick, Heisman Trophy-winning Notre Dame quarterback Angelo Bertelli, had enlisted in the United States Marine Corps in 1943 and never played in the NFL, instead making his professional debut with the Los Angeles Dons of the rival All-America Football Conference (AAFC) in 1946.

The complete list of players drafted by the Boston Yanks in 1944 follows. Due to the demands of World War II, none of these players actually played for the Yanks during the 1944 season.

1944 Boston Yanks draft
Round	Pick	Player	Position	College	Notes
1	1	Angelo Bertelli	Quarterback	Notre Dame	Played in AAFC in 1946
3	27	Babe Dimancheff	Halfback	Purdue	Played with Yanks in 1945
5	43	Larry Rice	Center	Tulane	
6	54	John "Butch" Parker	Tackle	Loyola (CA)	
7	65	Mike Andrews	End	NC State	
8	76	Bob Musick	Back	USC	
9	87	Caleb "Tex" Warrington	Guard	Auburn	Played in AAFC in 1946
10	98	Angelo Sisti	Tackle	Boston College	
11	109	Gene Long	Guard	Kansas	
12	120	Ed Fiorentino	End	Brown	Played with Yanks in 1947
13	131	Mike Zeleznak	Back	Kansas State	
14	142	John Maskas	Guard	VPI	
15	153	John Bond	Back	TCU	
16	164	Roger Antaya	Guard	Dartmouth	
17	175	Marshall Shurnas	End	Missouri	Played in AAFC in 1947
18	186	Reldon Bennett	Tackle	LSU	
19	197	Art Faircloth	Back	Guilford	Played in NFL in 1947
20	208	Tony Bilotti	Guard	Saint Mary's (CA)	
21	219	Bill Furman	Tackle	Washington & Lee	
22	230	Clare Morford	Guard	Oklahoma	
23	241	Dilton Richmond	End	LSU	
24	252	Courtney Lawlor	Back	Richmond	
25	263	Howard Debus	Back	Nebraska	
26	274	Bill Portwood	End	Kentucky	
27	285	Harold Collins	Guard	Southwestern (TX)	
28	296	Aubrey Gill	Center	Texas	
29	307	Chet Wasilewski	Back	Holy Cross	
30	318	Gus Letchas	Back	Georgia	
31	324	Ralph Calcagni	Tackle	Penn	Played with Yanks in 1946
32	330	Walton Roberts	Back	Texas	

== Regular season ==
=== Schedule ===
Week	Date	Opponent	Result	Record	Venue	Attendance	Recap	Sources
1	September 26	**Philadelphia Eagles**	**L** 7–28	0–1	Fenway Park			
—	Bye							
2	October 8	**New York Giants**	**L** 10–22	0–2	Fenway Park			
3	October 15	**Washington Redskins**	**L** 14–21	0–3	Fenway Park			
4	October 22	at **Philadelphia Eagles**	**L** 0–38	0–4	Shibe Park			
5	October 29	at **Brooklyn Tigers**	**W** 17–14	1–4	Ebbets Field			
6	November 5	at **New York Giants**	**L** 0–31	1–5	Polo Grounds			
7	November 12	at Chicago Bears	**L** 7–21	1–6	Wrigley Field			
8	November 19	**Brooklyn Tigers**	**W** 13–6	2–6	Fenway Park			
9	November 26	at **Washington Redskins**	**L** 7–14	2–7	Griffith Stadium			
10	December 3	at Detroit Lions	**L** 7–38	2–8	Briggs Stadium			
Note: Intra-division opponents are in **bold** text.

== Standings ==
NFL Eastern Division
	W	L	T	PCT	DIV	PF	PA	STK
New York Giants	8	1	1	.889	6–1–1	206	75	W4
Philadelphia Eagles	7	1	2	.875	6–0–2	267	131	W2
Washington Redskins	6	3	1	.667	4–3–1	169	180	L2
Boston Yanks	2	8	0	.200	2–6	82	233	L2
Brooklyn Tigers	0	10	0	.000	0–8	69	166	L10

Note: Tie games were not officially counted in the standings until 1972.

== Roster ==
1944 Boston Yanks final roster
**Backs**: 10 - Bob Davis QB/RB/CB/S; 11 - George Cafego FB/QB/P/S; 18 - Scott Gudmundson QB/RB/CB/S/P; 21 - Ken Steinmetz FB/QB/LB; 22 - Ted Williams RB/CB; 23 - Milton Crane FB/LB; 24 - Frank Turbert RB/CB; 25 - Tony Falkenstein FB/LB; 28 - Leo Stasica RB/QB/CB; 33 - Johnny Martin RB/CB/P; **Ends/Receivers**: 14 - Keith Ranspot; 15 - Joe Crowley; 17 - Morgan Tiller; 29 - Harry Wynne; 42 - Sam Goldman	**Linemen/Linebackers**: 16 - John Morelli G/DG; 19 - Ed Franco T/DT; 20 - Jim Magee C/LB; 30 - Ed Korisky C/LB; 36 - Thron Riggs T/DT; 37 - Art Albrecht C/LB; 38 - Frank Gaziano G/DG; 41 - Augie Lio G/DG/K; 40 - Edward McGee T/DT; 43 - Wimpy Giddens T/DT; 44 - Bill Walker G/DG; **Reserve**: 25 - Paul Sanders RB/CB (IR); 33 - David Smukler FB/LB (Susp.); rookies in italics
