= List of NFL players in World War II =

The United States entered the fighting in World War II in December 1941, just as the 1941 NFL season was drawing to a close. Mass enlistments and military conscription drew hundreds of players in the National Football League (NFL) to the colors, greatly impacting both team rosters and players' careers. Some players were able to continue to play football while in the military as part of the military service teams which proliferated as a focus for physical training and source of mass entertainment. Hundreds of NFL players had their playing careers interrupted or terminated by the conflict for months or years, losing seasons in their athletic prime.

This is a sortable list of players in the NFL who were active at their time of induction and who served in the American military at some point between 1940 and 1945. It includes their team at time of induction, position, branch of military service, year of enlistment, service details, and information on the military service teams on which they played during the war, if known.

Name	Team	Position	Branch	Induct	Service notes
Albrecht, Art	Boston Yanks	Tackle	Army	1944	
Dubzinski, Walter	Boston Yanks	Center	Navy	1944	
Falkenstein, Tony	Boston Yanks	Fullback	Navy	1944	
Goldman, Sam	Boston Yanks	End	Army	1944	
Harrison, Richard	Boston Yanks	End	Army	1944	
Riggs, Thron	Boston Yanks	Tackle	Army	1944	
Santora, Frank	Boston Yanks	Quarterback	Army	1944	
Walker, William B.	Boston Yanks	Guard	Navy	1944	
Alfson, Warren	Brooklyn Dodgers	Guard	Navy	1941	Officer
Bailey, E.L.	Brooklyn Dodgers	End	Navy	1941	Officer
Bushby, Sherill	Brooklyn Dodgers	Guard	Army	1940	
Cafego, George	Brooklyn Dodgers	Halfback	Army	1940	Officer; medical discharge
Cassiano, Dick	Brooklyn Dodgers	Halfback	Army	1940	
Coon, Edward	Brooklyn Dodgers	Guard	Army	1941	
Courtney, Gerald	Brooklyn Dodgers	Halfback	Army	1942	
Deremer, Arthur	Brooklyn Dodgers	Center	Navy A.C.	1942	Officer
Dougherty, George	Brooklyn Dodgers	Fullback	Army A.C.	1940	
Eliason, Don	Brooklyn Dodgers	End	Army	1942	
Fedora, Walter	Brooklyn Dodgers	Fullback	Army	1942	
Francis, Sam	Brooklyn Dodgers	Fullback	Army	1940	Officer
Frick, Ray	Brooklyn Dodgers	Center	Army	1941	
Fronzcek, Andrew	Brooklyn Dodgers	Tackle	Army	1941	
Gifford, Robert	Brooklyn Dodgers	Quarterback	Army	1942	
Gussle, Mike	Brooklyn Dodgers	Guard	Army	1940	Officer
Heineman, Ken	Brooklyn Dodgers	Halfback	Navy	1943	
Hodges, Herman	Brooklyn Dodgers	End	Marines	1942	Officer
Jeffries, Robert	Brooklyn Dodgers	Guard	Navy A.C.	1942	
Jocher, Arthur	Brooklyn Dodgers	Guard	Navy	1942	
Johnson, Cecil	Brooklyn Dodgers	Halfback	Army	1944	
Jones, Lewis	Brooklyn Dodgers	Guard	Navy	1944	
Jones, Thurman	Brooklyn Dodgers	Quarterback	Army	1941	Medical discharge
Jurich, Michael	Brooklyn Dodgers	Tackle	Army	1942	
Kapitansky, Bernard	Brooklyn Dodgers	Guard	Army	1942	
Kercheval, Ralph	Brooklyn Dodgers	Halfback	Army	1940	Officer
Kinard, George	Brooklyn Dodgers	Guard	Navy	1942	
Kinard, Frank "Bruiser"	Brooklyn Dodgers	Tackle	Navy	1944	
Kish, Ben	Brooklyn Dodgers	Quarterback	Army	1941	Medical discharge
Koons, Joe	Brooklyn Dodgers	Center	Army	1941	
Koshlap, Jules	Brooklyn Dodgers	Halfback	Army	1941	
Kracum, George	Brooklyn Dodgers	Fullback	Army	1941	
Kristufek, Frank	Brooklyn Dodgers	Tackle	Army	1941	

== See also ==
- List of National Football League players who died in wars
- List of American football players who died during their careers
