= 1945 Pittsburgh Steelers season =

NFL team season

- Head coach: Jim Leonard
- Home stadium: Forbes Field

Results
- Record: 2–8
- Division place: 5th NFL Eastern
- Playoffs: Did not qualify

The 1945 Pittsburgh Steelers season was the franchise's 13th season in the National Football League (NFL). The team finished the season with a record of 2–8. This season marked the first and only season played with Jim Leonard as head coach.

== Regular season ==
=== Schedule ===
Week	Date	Opponent	Result	Record
1	September 25	at Boston Yanks	L 7–28	0–1
3	October 7	New York Giants	L 6–34	0–2
4	October 14	Washington Redskins	L 0–14	0–3
5	October 21	at New York Giants	W 21–7	1–3
6	October 28	Boston Yanks	L 6–10	1–4
7	November 4	Philadelphia Eagles	L 3–45	1–5
8	November 11	Chicago Cardinals	W 23–0	2–5
9	November 18	at Philadelphia Eagles	L 6–30	2–6
10	November 25	at Chicago Bears	L 7–28	2–7
11	December 2	at Washington Redskins	L 0–24	2–8

Source: JT-SW.com

=== Game summaries ===
==== Week 1 (Tuesday September 25, 1945): Boston Yanks ====
	1	2	3	4	Total
Steelers	0	0	0	7	7
Yanks	7	7	7	7	28

at Fenway Park, Boston, Massachusetts

- Game time:
- Game weather:
- Game attendance: 27,502
- Referee:

Scoring drives:

- Boston – J. Martin 5 run (Lio kick)
- Boston – F. Martin 53 pass from Cafego (Lio kick)
- Boston – Manders 1 run (Lio kick)
- Pittsburgh – Lucente 60 lateral from Bova after 10 pass from Jarvi (Naioti kick)
- Boston – Manders 2 run (Lio kick)

==== Week 2 (Sunday, October 7, 1945): New York Giants ====
	1	2	3	4	Total
Giants	6	28	0	0	34
Steelers	0	6	0	0	6

at Forbes Field, Pittsburgh, Pennsylvania

- Game time:
- Game weather:
- Game attendance: 20,097
- Referee:

Scoring drives:

- New York – FG Strong 21
- New York – FG Strong 42
- Pittsburgh – Duhart 3 run (kick failed)
- New York – Filpowicz – 10 pass from Herber (Strong kick)
- New York – Leibel 38 pass from Herber (Strong kick)
- New York – Piccolo 7 fumble run (Strong kick)

==== Week 3 (Sunday October 14, 1945): Washington Redskins ====
	1	2	3	4	Total
Redskins	0	7	0	7	14
Steelers	0	0	0	0	0

at Forbes Field, Pittsburgh, Pennsylvania

- Game time:
- Game weather:
- Game attendance: 14,050
- Referee:

Scoring drives:

- Washington – Dye 13 pass from Baugh (Aguirre kick)
- Washington – Rosato 3 run (Aguirre kick)

==== Week 4 (Sunday October 21, 1945): New York Giants ====
	1	2	3	4	Total
Steelers	7	14	0	0	21
Giants	0	0	7	0	7

at Polo Grounds, New York, New York

- Game time:
- Game weather:
- Game attendance: 43,070
- Referee:

Scoring drives:

- Pittsburgh – Lucente 3 run (Naioti kick)
- Pittsburgh – Warren 1 run (Naioti kick)
- Pittsburgh – Doyle 50 interception (Naioti kick)
- New York – Livingston 15 pass from Herber (Strong kick)

==== Week 5 (Sunday October 28, 1945): Boston Yanks ====
	1	2	3	4	Total
Yanks	0	7	0	0	7
Steelers	0	3	0	14	17

at Forbes Field, Pittsburgh, Pennsylvania

- Game time:
- Game weather:
- Game attendance: 25,447
- Referee:

Scoring drives:

- Boston – FG Lio 19
- Pittsburgh – FG Agajanian 19
- Pittsburgh – FG Agajanian 25
- Boston Martin 25 lateral from Currivan after 27 pass from Gudmundson (Lio kick)

==== Week 6 (Sunday November 4, 1945): Philadelphia Eagles ====
	1	2	3	4	Total
Eagles	6	7	13	19	45
Steelers	3	0	0	0	3

at Forbes Field, Pittsburgh, Pennsylvania

- Game time:
- Game weather:
- Game attendance: 23,018
- Referee:

Scoring drives:

- Pittsburgh – FG Agajanian 31
- Philadelphia – Ferrante 26 pass from Zimmerman (kick failed)
- Philadelphia – Ferrante 65 pass from Zimmerman (Zimmerman kick)
- Philadelphia – Van Buren 20 run (kick failed)
- Philadelphia – Meyer 27 pass from Zimmerman (Zimmerman kick)
- Philadelphia – Banta 22 run (kick failed)
- Philadelphia – Bleeker 14 run (Zimmerman kick)
- Philadelphia – Karnofsky 19 run (kick failed)

==== Week 7 (Sunday November 11, 1945): Chicago Cardinals ====
	1	2	3	4	Total
Cardinals	0	0	0	0	0
Steelers	0	3	0	20	23

at Forbes Field, Pittsburgh, Pennsylvania

- Game time:
- Game weather:
- Game attendance: 13,153
- Referee:

Scoring drives:

- Pittsburgh – FG Agajanian 15
- Pittsburgh – Dudley 1 run (Dudley kick)
- Pittsburgh – Dudley 1 run (kick failed)
- Pittsburgh – Warren 75 run (Dudley kick)

==== Week 8 (Sunday November 18, 1945): Philadelphia Eagles ====
	1	2	3	4	Total
Steelers	6	0	0	0	6
Eagles	7	6	10	7	30

at Shibe Park, Philadelphia, Pennsylvania

- Game time:
- Game weather:
- Game attendance: 23,838
- Referee:

Scoring drives:

- Philadelphia – Karnofsky 12 run (Zimmerman kick)
- Pittsburgh – Kiick 1 run (kick failed)
- Philadelphia – Van Buren 3 run (kick failed)
- Philadelphia – FG Zimmerman 30
- Philadelphia – Van Buren 6 run (Zimmerman kick)
- Philadelphia – Steele 4 run (Rogalla kick)

==== Week 9 (Sunday November 25, 1945): Chicago Bears ====
	1	2	3	4	Total
Steelers	7	0	0	0	7
Bears	14	7	0	7	28

at Wrigley Field, Chicago, Illinois

- Game time:
- Game weather:
- Game attendance: 20,689
- Referee:

Scoring drives:

- Chicago Bears – McAffee 33 run (Gudauskas kick)
- Pittsburgh – Dudley 4 run (Agajanian kick)
- Chicago Bears – McAfee 65 pass from Luckman (Gudauskas kick)
- Chicago Bears – Grygo 33 pass from Luckman (Gudauskas kick)
- Chicago Bears – McAfee 2 run (Gudauskas kick)

==== Week 10 (Sunday December 2, 1945): Washington Redskins ====
	1	2	3	4	Total
Steelers	0	0	0	0	0
Redskins	7	7	0	10	24

at Griffith Stadium, Washington, DC

- Game time:
- Game weather:
- Game attendance: 34,788
- Referee:

Scoring drives:

- Washington – Bagarus 70 pass from Baugh (Aguirre kick)
- Washington – Turley 10 pass from Baugh (Aguirre kick)
- Washington – FG Aguirre 26
- Washington – Bagarus 29 pass from Baugh (Aguirre kick)

== Roster ==
1945 Pittsburgh Steelers final roster
Backs: 41 Tony Bova RB/CB; 35 Bill Dudley RB/CB/K; 37 Jack Itzel FB/LB; 44 Art Jones RB/CB; 63 George Kiick FB/LB; 74 Johnny Lucente FB/LB; 52 John Naioti RB/S; 18 Leon Pense RB/S; 57 John Petchel RB/S; 10 Al Postus RB/CB; 48 Sid Tinsley RB/CB/P; 15 Buss Warren RB/CB	Linemen/linebackers: 69 Tom Alberghini T/DT; 79 Art Brandau C/LB; 65 Garth Chamberlain G/DG; 73 Chuck Cherundolo C/LB; 78 Joe Cibulas T/DT; 82 Joe Coomer T/DT; 61 Henry DePaul G/DG; 72 Ted Doyle T/DT; 62 John Kondrla T/DT; 56 Hubbard Law G/DG; 36 Elmer Merkovsky G/DG; 39 John Perko G/DG; 75 Glen Stough T/DT; 49 Si Titus C/LB	Ends/receivers: 71 Dick Dolly; 60 Frank Kimble; 46 Joe Pierre; 53 Morgan Tiller; Special teams: 43 Ben Agajanian K; Reserve: 33 Jackie Lowther RB/CB; 64 John Patrick FB/LB; Rookies in italics

== Standings ==
NFL Eastern Division
	W	L	T	PCT	DIV	PF	PA	STK
Washington Redskins	8	2	0	.800	6–2	209	121	W2
Philadelphia Eagles	7	3	0	.700	5–2	272	133	W1
Yanks	3	6	1	.333	3–2–1	123	211	L5
New York Giants	3	6	1	.333	2–4–1	179	198	L1
Pittsburgh Steelers	2	8	0	.200	1–7	79	220	L3

Note: Tie games were not officially counted in the standings until 1972.
