= 1944 Washington Redskins season =

NFL team season

- Owner: George Preston Marshall
- General manager: Sid Carroll
- Head coach: Dudley DeGroot
- Home stadium: Griffith Stadium

Results
- Record: 6–3–1
- Division place: 3rd NFL Eastern
- Playoffs: Did not qualify

The 1944 Washington Redskins season was the franchise's 13th season in the National Football League (NFL) and their 7th in Washington, D.C. The team matched on their 6–3–1 record from 1943, when they made it to the Championship game but missed the playoffs.

== Schedule ==
Game	Date	Opponent	Result	Record	Venue	Attendance	Recap	Sources
1	October 8	at **Philadelphia Eagles**	**T** 31–31	0–0–1	Shibe Park	32,549	Recap	
2	October 15	at **Boston Yanks**	**W** 21–14	1–0–1	Fenway Park	17,758	Recap	
3	October 22	**Brooklyn Tigers**	**W** 17–14	2–0–1	Griffith Stadium	35,000	Recap	
4	October 29	Card-Pitt	**W** 42–20	3–0–1	Griffith Stadium	35,540	Recap	
5	November 5	Cleveland Rams	**W** 14–10	4–0–1	Griffith Stadium	35,450	Recap	
6	November 12	at **Brooklyn Tigers**	**W** 10–0	5–0–1	Ebbets Field	20,404	Recap	
7	November 19	**Philadelphia Eagles**	**L** 7–37	5–1–1	Griffith Stadium	35,540	Recap	
8	November 26	**Boston Yanks**	**W** 14–7	6–1–1	Griffith Stadium	35,540	Recap	
9	December 3	at **New York Giants**	**L** 13–16	6–2–1	Polo Grounds	47,457	Recap	
10	December 10	**New York Giants**	**L** 0–31	6–3–1	Griffith Stadium	35,540	Recap	
Note: Intra-division opponents are in **bold** text.

== Standings ==
NFL Eastern Division
	W	L	T	PCT	DIV	PF	PA	STK
New York Giants	8	1	1	.889	6–1–1	206	75	W4
Philadelphia Eagles	7	1	2	.875	6–0–2	267	131	W2
Washington Redskins	6	3	1	.667	4–3–1	169	180	L2
Boston Yanks	2	8	0	.200	2–6	82	233	L2
Brooklyn Tigers	0	10	0	.000	0–8	69	166	L10

Note: Tie games were not officially counted in the standings until 1972.

== Roster ==
1944 Washington Redskins final roster
Quarterbacks: 33 Sammy Baugh S/P; 30 Frank Filchock S; 31 Larry Weldon S/K; Backs: 18 Frank Akins FB/LB; 44 Andy Farkas RB/CB; 12 Larry Fuller RB/CB; 34 Mike Micka FB/LB; 35 Wilbur Moore RB/CB; 25 Frank Seno RB/CB; 20 Bob Seymour FB/LB/P; 15 Bob Sneddon RB/CB	Linemen/Linebackers: 11 Al Fiorentino G/DG; 26 Vern Foltz C/LB; 13 Larry Johnson C/LB; 47 Jack Keenan C/T/LB/DT; 49 John Koniszewski T/DT; 51 Ed Merkle G/DG; 42 Jim North T/DT; 16 Everett Sharp T/DT; 53 Mitchell Ucovich G/DG; 46 Joe Ungerer T/DT; 21 Frank Walton G/DG; 27 Joe Zeno T/DT	Ends/Receivers: 19 Joe Aguirre K; 38 Les Dye; 45 Ted Lapka; 40 Al Piasecky; 22 Doug Turley; rookies in italics
