= 1945 Philadelphia Eagles season =

NFL team season

- Head coach: Greasy Neale
- Home stadium: Shibe Park

Results
- Record: 7–3
- Division place: 2nd NFL Eastern
- Playoffs: Did not qualify

The 1945 Philadelphia Eagles season was the Eagles' 13th in the league. The team failed to improve on its previous output of 7–1–2, losing three games.

As a result, the team also failed to qualify for the playoffs for the 13th consecutive season.

== Offseason ==
=== NFL draft ===
The 1945 NFL draft was held on April 8, 1945. It was the last draft held in Chicago; later in the year, the league moved its offices to Philadelphia. The Eagles ended up with picks in thirty of the thirty-two rounds in the draft, and picked ninth in each of those rounds. The teams with the five worst records in the 1944 season were the only teams picking in rounds two and four.

Future Hall of Famers in this draft included Charley Trippi, a halfback from Georgia who was chosen in the first round and was the number one pick of the Chicago Cardinals. Elroy "Crazylegs" Hirsch, a wide receiver from Michigan was chosen as fifth overall by the Cleveland Rams. Pete Pihos, a defensive end from Indiana University, Tom Fears, an end from UCLA, and Arnie Weinmeister, a defensive tackle from Washington were also part of this draft.

=== Player selections ===
The table shows the Eagles selections, what picks they had that were traded away, and the team that ended up with that pick. It is possible the Eagles' pick ended up with this team via another team that the Eagles made a trade with. Not shown are acquired picks that the Eagles traded away.

| = Pro Bowler | = Hall of Famer |

| Rd | Pick | Player | Position | School | Rd | Pick | Player | Position | School |
|---|---|---|---|---|---|---|---|---|---|
| 1 | 8 | John Yonakor | Defensive end | Notre Dame | 2 | | No PICK | | |
| 3 | 25 | Alvin Dark | Back | LSU | 4 | | No PICK | | |
| 5 | 41 | Pete Pihos | Wide receiver | Indiana | 6 | 52 | Chuck Dellago | Guard | Minnesota |
| 7 | 63 | Gonzalo Morales | Back | St. Mary's (CA) | 8 | 41 | Sam Robinson | Back | Washington |
| 9 | 85 | Forrest Hall | Back | San Francisco | 10 | 96 | Joe Sadonis | Tackle | Fordham |
| 11 | 107 | Rudy Mobley | Back | Hardin–Simmons | 12 | 118 | Jim Newmeyer | Tackle | St. Vincent |
| 13 | 129 | Bill Chambers | Tackle | UCLA | 14 | 140 | John Duda | Back | Virginia |
| 15 | 151 | Bill Montgomery | Back | Louisiana State | 16 | 162 | Howard Werner | End | Syracuse |
| 17 | 173 | Jim Austin | Back | Missouri | 18 | 184 | Quentin Klenk | Tackle | USC |
| 19 | 195 | Joe Spencer | Tackle | Oklahoma A & M | 20 | 206 | Leo Pratt | Tackle | Oklahoma A & M |
| 21 | 217 | Phil Teschner | Tackle | Brown | 22 | 2228 | John Magee | Guard | Rice |
| 23 | 239 | Norm "Monk" Mosley | Back | Alabama | 24 | 250 | Blair Brown | Guard | Oklahoma A & M |
| 25 | 261 | Bob Hall | End | Stanford | 26 | 272 | Dan Talcott | Tackle | Nevada-Reno |
| 27 | 283 | Bill Thompson | Tackle | New Mexico | 28 | 294 | Al Fleming | Center | Wichita State |
| 29 | 305 | Leo Benjamin | Center | West Virginia | 30 | 316 | Jim Dougherty | Back | University of Miami (OH) |
| 31 | 292 | Ken Reese | Back | Alabama | 32 | 298 | Loren Braner | Center | Pittsburgh |

== Schedule ==
| Week | Date | Opponent | Result | Record | Venue | Attendance |
|---|---|---|---|---|---|---|
| 1 | October 7 | Chicago Cardinals | W 21–6 | 1–0 | Shibe Park | 25,581 |
| 2 | October 14 | at Detroit Lions | L 24–28 | 1–1 | Briggs Stadium | 22,580 |
| 3 | October 21 | at Washington Redskins | L 14–24 | 1–2 | Griffith Stadium | 35,550 |
| 4 | October 28 | Cleveland Rams | W 28–14 | 2–2 | Shibe Park | 38,149 |
| 5 | November 4 | at Pittsburgh Steelers | W 45–3 | 3–2 | Forbes Field | 23,018 |
| 6 | November 11 | New York Giants | W 38–17 | 4–2 | Shibe Park | 30,047 |
| 7 | November 18 | Pittsburgh Steelers | W 30–6 | 5–2 | Shibe Park | 23,838 |
| 8 | November 25 | Washington Redskins | W 16–0 | 6–2 | Shibe Park | 37,306 |
| 9 | December 2 | at New York Giants | L 21–28 | 6–3 | Polo Grounds | 45,372 |
| 10 | December 9 | Yanks | W 35–7 | 7–3 | Shibe Park | 27,905 |

== Standings ==
NFL Eastern Division
| | W | L | T | PCT | DIV | PF | PA | STK |
|---|---|---|---|---|---|---|---|---|
| Washington Redskins | 8 | 2 | 0 | .800 | 6–2 | 209 | 121 | W2 |
| Philadelphia Eagles | 7 | 3 | 0 | .700 | 5–2 | 272 | 133 | W1 |
| Yanks | 3 | 6 | 1 | .333 | 3–2–1 | 123 | 211 | L5 |
| New York Giants | 3 | 6 | 1 | .333 | 2–4–1 | 179 | 198 | L1 |
| Pittsburgh Steelers | 2 | 8 | 0 | .200 | 1–7 | 79 | 220 | L3 |

Note: Tie games were not officially counted in the standings until 1972.

== Roster ==
(All time List of Philadelphia Eagles players in franchise history)

= 1945 Pro All-Star
- + = 1st team All-Star

| NO. | Player | AGE | POS | GP | GS | WT | HT | YRS | College |
|---|---|---|---|---|---|---|---|---|---|
| | Greasy Neale | 53 | Coach | _{1945 record} 7–3–0 | _{NFL-Eagles; Lifetime} 23–25–4 | | | 5th | West Virginia Wesleyan |
| | Ben Agajanian | 26 | K | 1 | 1 | 215 | 6–0 | Rookie | New Mexico |
| | Bruno Banducci | 25 | G | 9 | 8 | 216 | 5–11 | 1 | Stanford |
| | Jack Banta | 28 | HB | 5 | 1 | 191 | 5–11 | 4 | USC |
| | Mel Bleeker | 25 | HB | 4 | 4 | 189 | 5–11 | 1 | USC |
| | Johnny Butler | 27 | HB-TB | 7 | 0 | 185 | 5–10 | 2 | Tennessee |
| | Larry Cabrelli | 28 | E-DB | 10 | 8 | 194 | 5–11 | 4 | Colgate |
| | Rocco Canale | 28 | T-G | 3 | 0 | 240 | 5–11 | 2 | Boston College |
| | Jim Castiglia | 27 | FB | 1 | 1 | 208 | 5–11 | 4 | Georgetown (DC) |
| | Enio Conti | 32 | G | 2 | 1 | 204 | 5–11 | 4 | _{Arkansas, and Bucknell} |
| | Dick Erdlitz | 25 | HB | 7 | 0 | 181 | 5–10 | 3 | Northwestern |
| | Jack Ferrante | 29 | E-DE | 10 | 8 | 197 | 6–1 | 4 | none |
| | Terry Fox | 27 | FB-LB | 2 | 0 | 208 | 6–1 | 4 | Miami (FL) |
| | George Fritts | 26 | T | 10 | 1 | 205 | 5–11 | 4 | Clemson Tigers football |
| | Charlie Gauer | 24 | FB-E | 7 | 0 | 213 | 6–2 | 2 | Colgate |
| | Jack Hinkle | 28 | B | 3 | 2 | 195 | 6–0 | 5 | Syracuse |
| | Dick Humbert | 27 | E-DE | 4 | 2 | 179 | 6–1 | 4 | Richmond |
| | Abe Karnofsky | 23 | QB-HB-DB | 8 | 2 | 175 | 5–10 | Rookie | Arizona |
| | Bucko Kilroy | 24 | G-MG-T-DT | 9 | 0 | 243 | 6–2 | 2 | _{Notre Dame, and Temple} |
| | Ben Kish | 28 | B | 9 | 5 | 207 | 6–0 | 5 | Pittsburgh |
| | Vic Lindskog | 31 | C | 10 | 6 | 203 | 6–1 | 1 | Stanford |
| | Mike Mandarino | 24 | T-C-G | 5 | 0 | 240 | 5–11 | 1 | La Salle |
| | Bap Manzini | 25 | C | 9 | 4 | 195 | 5–11 | 1 | St. Vincent |
| | Duke Maronic | 24 | G | 8 | 2 | 209 | 5–9 | 1 | none |
| | Flip McDonald | 24 | E | 9 | 2 | 200 | 6–2 | 1 | Oklahoma |
| | Fred Meyer | 26 | E-DE | 8 | 0 | 190 | 6–2 | 3 | Stanford |
| | Eddie Michaels | 31 | G | 9 | 8 | 205 | 5–11 | 9 | Villanova |
| | Red Ramsey | 34 | E | 2 | 0 | 196 | 6–0 | 7 | Texas Tech |
| | John Rogalla | 28 | FB | 8 | 4 | 215 | 6–0 | Rookie | Scranton |
| | Jack Sanders | 28 | G | 3 | 0 | 219 | 6–0 | 5 | SMU |
| | Vic Sears | 27 | T-DT | 10 | 9 | 223 | 6–3 | 4 | Oregon State |
| | Allie Sherman | 22 | QB | 10 | 1 | 170 | 5–11 | 2 | Brooklyn |
| | Abe Shires | 28 | T | 7 | 0 | 220 | 6–2 | Rookie | Tennessee |
| | John G. Smith | | T | 1 | 0 | 200 | 6–2 | Rookie | Florida |
| | Milt Smith | 26 | DB-QB | 5 | 0 | 185 | 6–3 | Rookie | UCLA |
| | Ernie Steele | 28 | HB-DB | 7 | 1 | 187 | 6–0 | 3 | Washington |
| | Gil Steinke | 26 | HB | 7 | 1 | 175 | 6–0 | Rookie | Texas A&M-Kingsville |
| | Bob Suffridge | 29 | G | 10 | 1 | 205 | 6–0 | 4 | Tennessee |
| | Tommy Thompson | 29 | QB | 8 | 0 | 192 | 6–1 | 5 | Tulsa |
| | Steve Van Buren+ | 25 | HB | 10 | 9 | 200 | 6–0 | 1 | LSU |
| | Buzz Warren | 29 | TB-HB | 1 | 0 | 175 | 5–11 | Rookie | Tennessee |
| | Al Wistert+ | 25 | T-G-DT | 10 | 10 | 214 | 6–1 | 2 | Michigan |
| | Roy Zimmerman | 27 | QB-WB-K | 10 | 8 | 201 | 6–2 | 5 | San Jose State |
| | 41 Players; Team Average | 26.3 | | 10 | | 201.5 | 6–0.1 | 2.5 | |
