= John Morelli =

John Morelli may refer to:

- Jack Morelli (born 1962), comic book letterer and author, also credited under the name John Morelli
- John Morelli (American football) (1923–2004), American football player
