= Charles Behan =

Charles Behan may refer to:

- Charlie Behan (1920–1945), American football player and Navy Cross recipient
- Petie Behan (1887–1957), Major League Baseball pitcher
