= 1944 Brooklyn Tigers season =

National Football League team season

- Owner: Dan Topping
- General manager: Tom Gallery
- Head coach: Frank Bridges, Pete Cawthon, and Ed Kubale
- Home stadium: Ebbets Field

Results
- Record: 0–10
- Division place: 5th NFL Eastern
- Playoffs: Did not qualify

The 1944 Brooklyn Tigers season was their 15th and final season in the league before merging with the Boston Yanks. The team failed to improve on their previous season's output of 2–8, losing all ten games. They failed to qualify for the playoffs for the 13th consecutive season.

== Schedule ==
Game	Date	Opponent	Result	Record	Venue	Attendance	Recap	Sources
1	September 17	at Green Bay Packers	**L** 7–14	0–1	Wisconsin State Fair Park	12,994	Recap	
2	October 8	at Detroit Lions	**L** 14–19	0–2	Briggs Stadium	15,702	Recap	
3	October 15	**New York Giants**	**L** 7–14	0–3	Ebbets Field	24,854	Recap	
4	October 22	at **Washington Redskins**	**L** 14–17	0–4	Griffith Stadium	35,540	Recap	
5	October 29	**Boston Yanks**	**L** 14–17	0–5	Ebbets Field	13.237	Recap	
6	November 5	**Philadelphia Eagles**	**L** 7–21	0–6	Ebbets Field	15,289	Recap	
7	November 12	**Washington Redskins**	**L** 0–10	0–7	Ebbets Field	20,404	Recap	
8	November 19	at **Boston Yanks**	**L** 6–13	0–8	Fenway Park	15,666	Recap	
9	November 26	at **New York Giants**	**L** 0–7	0–9	Polo Grounds	29,387	Recap	
10	December 3	at **Philadelphia Eagles**	**L** 0–34	0–10	Shibe Park	13,467	Recap	
Note: Intra-division opponents are in **bold** text.

== Standings ==
Program for an exhibition game between the Tigers and an Army service team. Fort Francis D. Warren, Cheyenne, Wyoming, September 10, 1944.

NFL Eastern Division
	W	L	T	PCT	DIV	PF	PA	STK
New York Giants	8	1	1	.889	6–1–1	206	75	W4
Philadelphia Eagles	7	1	2	.875	6–0–2	267	131	W2
Washington Redskins	6	3	1	.667	4–3–1	169	180	L2
Boston Yanks	2	8	0	.200	2–6	82	233	L2
Brooklyn Tigers	0	10	0	.000	0–8	69	166	L10

Note: Tie games were not officially counted in the standings until 1972.

== Draft ==
The 1944 NFL draft was held on April 19, 1944, at the Warwick Hotel in Philadelphia. By agreement of league owners, the new Boston Yanks franchise received the first pick of the first round and then were subsequently assigned 11th in the order of draft selection.

Although there were 32 rounds in the 1944 draft, each of the league's 11 teams selected 30 players, for a total of 330 players picked. The five worst-finishing teams of the 1943 season picked alone in rounds 2 and 4, while the five best-finishing teams plus the expansion Yanks picked alone in rounds 31 and 32.

The complete list of players drafted by the Brooklyn Tigers in 1944 follows. Due to the demands of World War II, only one of these players actually played for the Tigers during the 1944 season. Two others played for the merged franchise operating as the Yanks from 1945.

1944 Brooklyn Tigers draft
Round	Pick	Player	Position	College	Notes
1	3	Creighton Miller	Back	Notre Dame	
2	13	Jim Callahan	Tailback	Texas	Played in NFL in 1946
3	18	Ralph Park	Back	Texas	
4	29	Rudy Sikich	Tackle	Minnesota	Played in NFL in 1945
5	34	Verne Ullom	End	Cincinnati	
6	45	Bruce McDonald	End	Illinois State	
7	56	Bob Graiziger	Guard	Minnesota	
8	67	Jack Sachse	Center	Texas	Played for this franchise in 1945
9	78	Mitchell Olenski	Tackle	Alabama	Played in AAFC in 1946
10	89	Aldo Cenci	Back	Penn State	
11	100	John Bicanich	Guard	Minnesota	
12	111	Jim Tyree	End	Oklahoma	
13	122	Jim Wright	Guard	SMU	
14	133	John Genis	Tackle	Illinois	
15	144	Billy J. Murphy	Back	Mississippi State	
16	155	Doug Essick	End	USC	
17	166	Howard Maley	Halfback	SMU	
18	177	Don Willer	Tackle	USC	
19	188	Howard Callanan	Back	USC	
20	199	George Doherty	Tackle	Louisiana Tech	Played for Brooklyn in 1944
21	210	Mike Mihalic	Guard	Mississippi State	
22	221	Ted Cook	End	Alabama	Played in NFL in 1947
23	232	Bucky Gillenwater	Tackle	Texas	
24	243	Jack Baldwin	Center	Centenary	Played in AAFC in 1946
25	254	Dick Manning	Back	USC	
26	265	Ray Grierson	End	Illinois	
27	276	Joe Golding	Back	Oklahoma	Played for this franchise in 1947
28	287	Bob Zimny	Tackle	Indiana	Played in NFL in 1945
29	298	Marty Frohm	Tackle	Mississippi State	
30	309	Howard Blose	Back	Cornell	
Made roster * Made at least one Pro Bowl during career

== Roster ==
Backs
• 9 - Pug Manders FB/LB
• 10 - Frank Martin RB/CB
• 11 - Charles McGibbony RB/CB/P
• 12 - Kenny Fryer RB/CB/P
• 19 - Johnny Butler RB/CB/P
• 21 - Charlie Taylor RB/S
• 26 - Bill Brown RB/S
• 27 - Steve Marko RB/CB
• 30 - Frank Sachse RB/CB
• 42 - Ray Hare RB/CB

Linemen/Linebackers
• 16 - John Ellis G/DG
• 17 - Tony Leon G/DG
• 24 - Floyd Rhea G/DG
• 23 - Gordon Wilson G/DG
• 25 - Bruiser Kinard T/DT/K
• 33 - Vaughn Stewart C/LB
• 36 - Frank Strom T/DT
• 38 - George Doherty T/DT
• 43 - Charlie Ware T/DT
• 44 - George Sergienko T/DT
• 57 - George Smith C/LB

Ends
• 18 - George Weeks
• 22 - Andy Kowalski
• 28 - Bob Masterson K
• 35 - Rocky Eguccioni
• 55 - Joe Carter

Reserve
• 31 - Bill LaFitte (military) E

rookies in italics
