= Corinth School District =

School district in Mississippi

The Corinth School District is a public school district based in Corinth, Mississippi, United States. The district includes Corinth High School. Easom High School served black students in the area during segregation.

== Schools ==
- Corinth High School (grades 9-12)
- Corinth Junior High School (Grades 7-8)
- South Corinth Elementary School (grades 5-6)
- East Corinth Elementary School (grades 2-4)
- West Corinth Elementary School (grades K-1)

The two-story brick high school was built in 1938 and 1939 according to an Art Moderne design by Stevens & Johnston.

Its football team was established in 1913 and won a state playoff championship in 2019.

The school has a homecoming parade through downtown Corinth with floats. Another tradition is the beauty revue.

Schools in the area were segregated. Black students attended Easom High School, which later became South Corinth High School. After desegregation, white faculty increased and black faculty decreased.

Edward Simon Bishop Sr., the first black mayor of Corinth, was a principal at Eason High School.

The school's athletic teams are known as The Warriors.

Alumni who played in the NFL include receiver Larry Dorsey, Carver Shannon, Jackie Simpson, and Ev Sharp.

== Demographics ==
=== 2006-07 school year ===
There were a total of 1,947 students enrolled in the Corinth School District during the 2006–07 school year. The gender makeup of the district was 48% female and 52% male. The racial makeup of the district was 40.01% African American, 55.47% White, 3.75% Hispanic, 0.56% Asian, and 0.21% Native American. 47.1% of the district's students were eligible to receive free lunch.

=== Previous school years ===
School year	Enrollment	Gender makeup		Racial makeup				
School year	Enrollment	Female	Male	Asian	African American	Hispanic	Native American	White
2005-06	1,904	49%	51%	0.63%	42.17%	3.05%	–	54.15%
2004-05	1,881	49%	51%	0.74%	41.41%	3.30%	0.05%	54.49%
2003-04	1,808	48%	52%	1.00%	42.92%	2.54%	0.06%	53.48%
2002-03	1,781	47%	53%	0.90%	43.12%	2.36%	0.11%	53.51%

== Accountability statistics ==
	2006-07	2005-06	2004-05	2003-04	2002-03
District accreditation status	Accredited	Accredited	Accredited	Accredited	Accredited
School performance classifications
Level 5 (Superior Performing) Schools	3	3	4	4	3
Level 4 (Exemplary) Schools	1	1	0	0	0
Level 3 (Successful) Schools	0	0	0	0	1
Level 2 (Under Performing) Schools	0	0	0	0	0
Level 1 (Low Performing) Schools	0	0	0	0	0

== See also ==
- List of school districts in Mississippi
