= James North =

James North may refer to:

- Jim North (1919–2003), American football player
- Daniel Frazier (died 1833), U.S. sailor whose real name was James North
