= List of National Football League players who died in wars =

This is a list of players who left the National Football League to join the military in a time of war, including those who were drafted, and died in wars. Fourteen died in World War II, two in the Vietnam War and one in the War in Afghanistan. In World War II, Jack Lummus and Charlie Behan were posthumously awarded the Medal of Honor and the Navy Cross, respectively. All players listed below served in the United States military.

== World War II ==
Name	Age	Year died	Position	Team	Last year played	Service	Details of death if available
Mike Basca	27	1944	Halfback	Philadelphia Eagles	1941	Army	Killed when his tank was hit by a German 88.
Charlie Behan	24	1945	End	Detroit Lions	1942	Marines	Killed in action during the Battle of Okinawa. Posthumously awarded the Navy Cross.
Harry Benson	34	1943	Guard	Philadelphia Eagles	1935	Army	Killed in action in the Aleutian Islands campaign.
Keith Birlem	28	1943	End	Washington Redskins	1939	Air Force	While trying to land his combat-damaged B-17 heavy bomber, he collided with another aircraft. Both crashed, with no survivors.
Al Blozis	26	1945	Offensive tackle	New York Giants	1944	Army	Lost in France when he went in search of two of his men who had failed to return from a scouting mission.
Young Bussey	27	1945	Quarterback	Chicago Bears	1945	Navy	Killed when his landing craft was hit by a Japanese mortar while stuck on a coral reef.
Howard "Smiley" Johnson	28	1945	Guard	Green Bay Packers	1941	Marines	Killed by a mortar shell during the Battle of Iwo Jima.
Alex Ketzko	25	1944	Tackle	Detroit Lions	1943	Army	Killed in action during the Battle of the Bulge.
Jack Lummus	29	1945	End	New York Giants	1937	Marines	Stepped on a land mine during the Battle of Iwo Jima. Posthumously awarded the Medal of Honor.
Dave Schreiner	24	1945	End	Detroit Lions	1943	Marines	Killed by a sniper during the Battle of Okinawa.
Len Supulski	22	1943	End	Philadelphia Eagles	1942	Air Force	Died in a training flight crash.
Don Wemple	27	1944	End	Brooklyn Dodgers	1941	Air Force	His airplane was shot down while flying over "the Hump".
Chet Wetterlund	26	1944	Halfback	Detroit Lions	1942	Navy	Died when a training flight crashed.
Waddy Young	28	1945	End	Brooklyn Dodgers	1940	Air Force	Died in a mid-air collision with a damaged B-29 he was trying to protect.

== Vietnam War ==
Name	Age	Year died	Position	Team	Last year played	Service	Details of death if available
Bob Kalsu	25	1970	Guard	Buffalo Bills	1968	Army	Killed during the Battle of Fire Support Base Ripcord.
Don Steinbrunner	35	1967	Tackle	Cleveland Browns	1953	Air Force	His Fairchild C-123 Provider was shot down while on a defoliation mission. Awarded the Distinguished Flying Cross.

== War in Afghanistan ==
Name	Age	Year died	Position	Team	Last year played	Service	Details of death if available
Pat Tillman	27	2004	Safety	Arizona Cardinals	2001	Army	Killed by friendly fire.

== See also ==
- List of NFL players in World War II
- List of American football players who died during their careers
