= Ed Merkle =

American football player (1917–1987)

- Merkle in 1946

No. 51
- Position: Guard

Personal information
- Born: July 3, 1917; Windsor, Missouri, USA
- Died: November 27, 1987 (aged 70); Los Angeles
- Listed height: 5 ft 10 in (1.78 m)
- Listed weight: 215 lb (98 kg)

Career information
- College: Oklahoma A&M

Career history
- 1944: Washington Redskins

Career NFL statistics
- Games played: 10
- Starts: 4
- Stats at Pro Football Reference

Edward Lee Merkle (July 3, 1917 – November 27, 1987) was an American professional football guard in the National Football League for the Washington Redskins. He played college football at Oklahoma A&M.

== Biography ==
Ed Merkle was born July 3, 1917, at Windsor, Missouri. He was of Dutch-German ancestry.

He attended Oklahoma Agricultural and Mechanical College (Oklahoma A&M), today's Oklahoma State University, where he played football for the Cowboys.

He joined the Washington Redskins of the National Football League (NFL) for the 1944 season, seeing action in 10 games and starting in 4. After World War II, Merkle attempted to resurrect his professional football career as a member of the Los Angeles Dons of the All-America Football Conference, but he was released just ahead of the season and did not see regular season action for that team.

Merkle died November 27, 1987, in Los Angeles County, California. He was 70 years old at the time of his death.
