= John Lucente =

American football player (1922–)

- Lucente, circa 1945

No. 74, 51, 24
- Position: Fullback

Personal information
- Born: November 4, 1922; Clarksburg, West Virginia, U.S.
- Died: December 25, 2002 (aged 80); Dearborn, Michigan, U.S.
- Listed height: 5 ft 9 in (1.75 m)
- Listed weight: 200 lb (91 kg)

Career information
- High school: Victory (Clarksburg)
- College: West Virginia

Career history
- Pittsburgh Steelers (1945); Richmond Rebels (1946); Wilmington Clippers (1947)
- Stats at Pro Football Reference

John Lucente (November 4, 1922 – December 25, 2002) was an American professional football fullback who played for the Pittsburgh Steelers of the National Football League (NFL). He played college football for the West Virginia Mountaineers.

== Early life ==
John Lucente was born on November 4, 1922, in Clarksburg, West Virginia. He played high school football at Victory High School in Clarksburg, and earned all-state honors at fullback as a senior in 1941.

== College career ==
Lucente enrolled at West Virginia University to play college football for the Mountaineers. He was on the traveling team in 1942. He was the starting fullback in 1943 and earned a varsity letter. In 1944, Lucente was moved to quarterback, splitting time with Gus Rader. In October 1944, Lucente quit school to go to work.

== Professional career ==
Lucente signed with the Pittsburgh Steelers of the National Football League (NFL) on June 12, 1945. He played in all ten games, starting six, for the Steelers during the 1945 season as a fullback/linebacker, totaling 82 carries for 242 yards and one touchdown, 11 receptions for 45 yards, five kick returns for 102 yards, eight fumbles, and six fumble recoveries. Lucente's 287 yards from scrimmage was second-most on the team behind Buss Warren's 291. Lucente's 405 all-purpose yards was second-most behind Warren's 622 yards. The Steelers finished the year with a 2–8 record. On September 5, 1946, during the preseason, Lucente was released by the Steelers after the team acquired halfback Merl Condit. This allowed Pittsburgh to move Steve Lach into the fullback spot.

Lucente played in nine games, starting four, for the Richmond Rebels of the Dixie League during the 1946 season, rushing 46 times for 241 yards and one touchdown. He played for the Wilmington Clippers of the American Football League in 1947, scoring one rushing touchdown.

== Personal life ==
Lucente died on December 25, 2002, in Dearborn, Michigan. His obituary in the Detroit Free Press said he was manager of the "Italian American Club".
