= List of mayors of Tukwila, Washington =

Mayor of Tukwila
- Incumbent; Thomas McLeod since January 1, 2024
- Term length: 4 years
- Inaugural holder: Joel Shomaker
- Formation: June 23, 1908
- Website: http://www.tukwilawa.gov/mayor/

This is a list of mayors of Tukwila, Washington. In 1908, Tukwila was incorporated as a city. Joel Shomaker, the first mayor, was integral in the movement towards incorporation. Jim Haggerton was elected mayor in 2007 and assumed office on January 1, 2008. Reelected to a second term in 2011, he has announced that he will not run for a third.

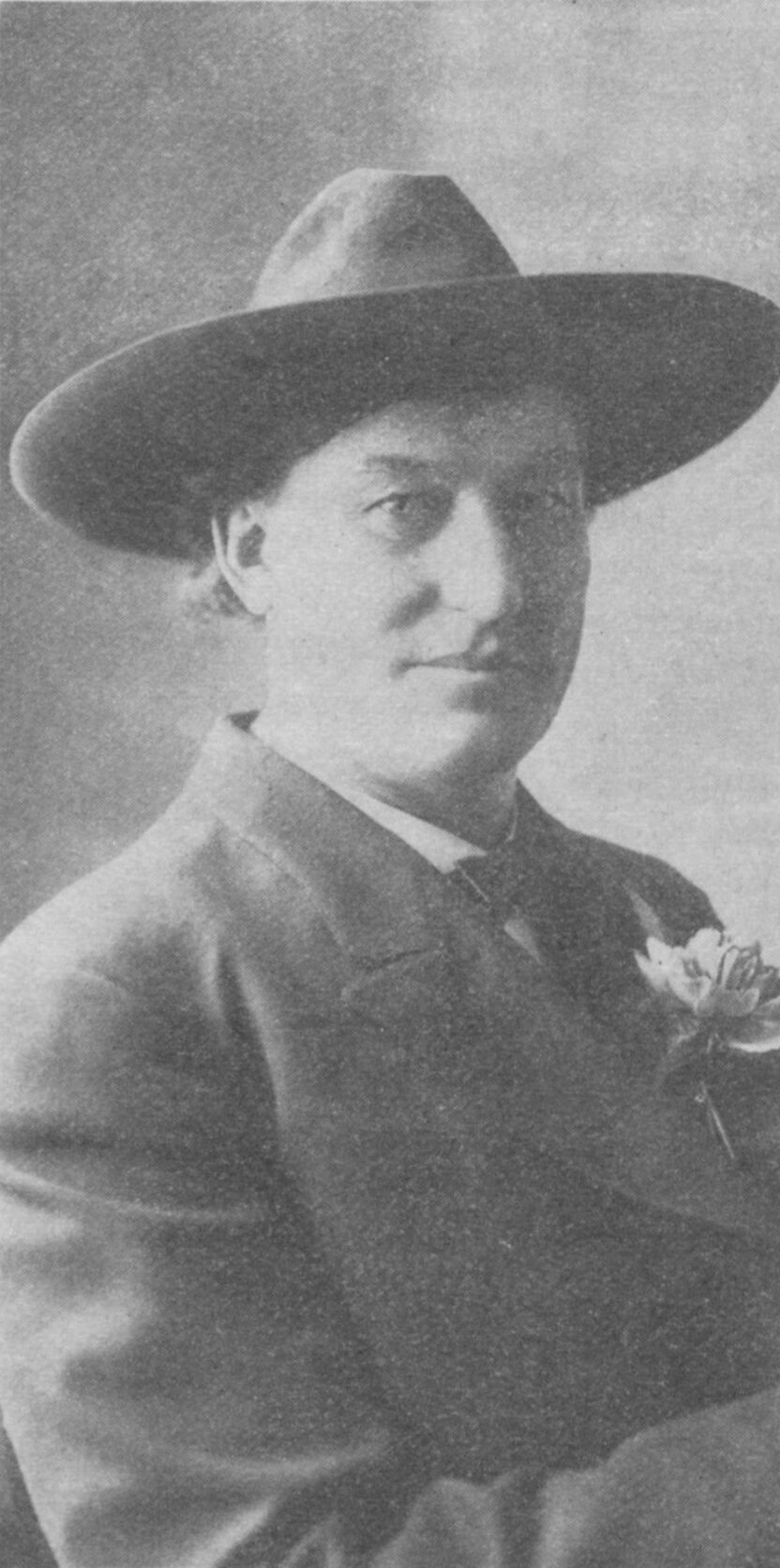
Joel Shomaker, circa 1916

== History ==
Tukwila was incorporated on June 23, 1908, with Joel Shomaker as mayor. Shomaker, farm editor for the Seattle Post-Intelligencer, had pushed for the city to be incorporated and planned the newspaper contest that decided the city's name. Many mayors have had a lasting legacy in Tukwila, where Strander, Minkler, and Baker Boulevards are named after mayors who served in the middle of the twentieth century.

== Duties ==
As an optional municipal code city, Tukwila is governed by Title 35A of the Revised Code of Washington. As a mayor-council government, the mayor provides over all city council meetings, breaks tied votes, reports as to the city's finances, and prepares the budget. The mayor has the right to veto ordinances, but that veto can be overridden by a 50%-plus-two majority of the city council.

== List of mayors ==
#	Name	Term began	Term ended
1	Joel Shomaker	June 23, 1908	December 31, 1909
2	Ernest Engel	January 1, 1910	December 31, 1911
3	Jacob Guntert	January 1, 1912	January 14, 1913
4	John Hall	January 14, 1913	December 31, 1914
5	Sylvanus Harlow Stevens	January 1, 1915	December 31, 1918
6	Edward F. Greene	January 1, 1919	December 31, 1924
7	George C. Bergquist	January 1, 1925	December 31, 1927
8	John R. Walkup	January 1, 1928	June 5, 1933
9	John P. Walkup	June 5, 1933	June 2, 1947
10	Charles Baker	June 2, 1947	April 2, 1962
11	John Strander (1924–1998)	April 2, 1962	December 31, 1967
12	Stanley Minkler	January 1, 1968	December 31, 1971
13	Frank Todd (1923–2004)	January 1, 1972	December 31, 1975
14	Edgar Bauch (1924–2004)	January 1, 1976	December 31, 1979
15	Frank Todd (1923–2004)	December 1, 1980	July 15, 1982
16	Gary VanDusen (1941–)	July 15, 1982	December 31, 1991
17	John W. Rants	January 1, 1992	December 31, 1999
18	Steve Mullett (1943–2017)	January 1, 2000	December 31, 2007
19	Jim Haggerton	January 1, 2008	December 31, 2015
20	Allan Ekberg (1959–)	January 1, 2016	December 31, 2023
21	Thomas McLeod	January 1, 2024	Present
