= Tukwila, Washington =

- City
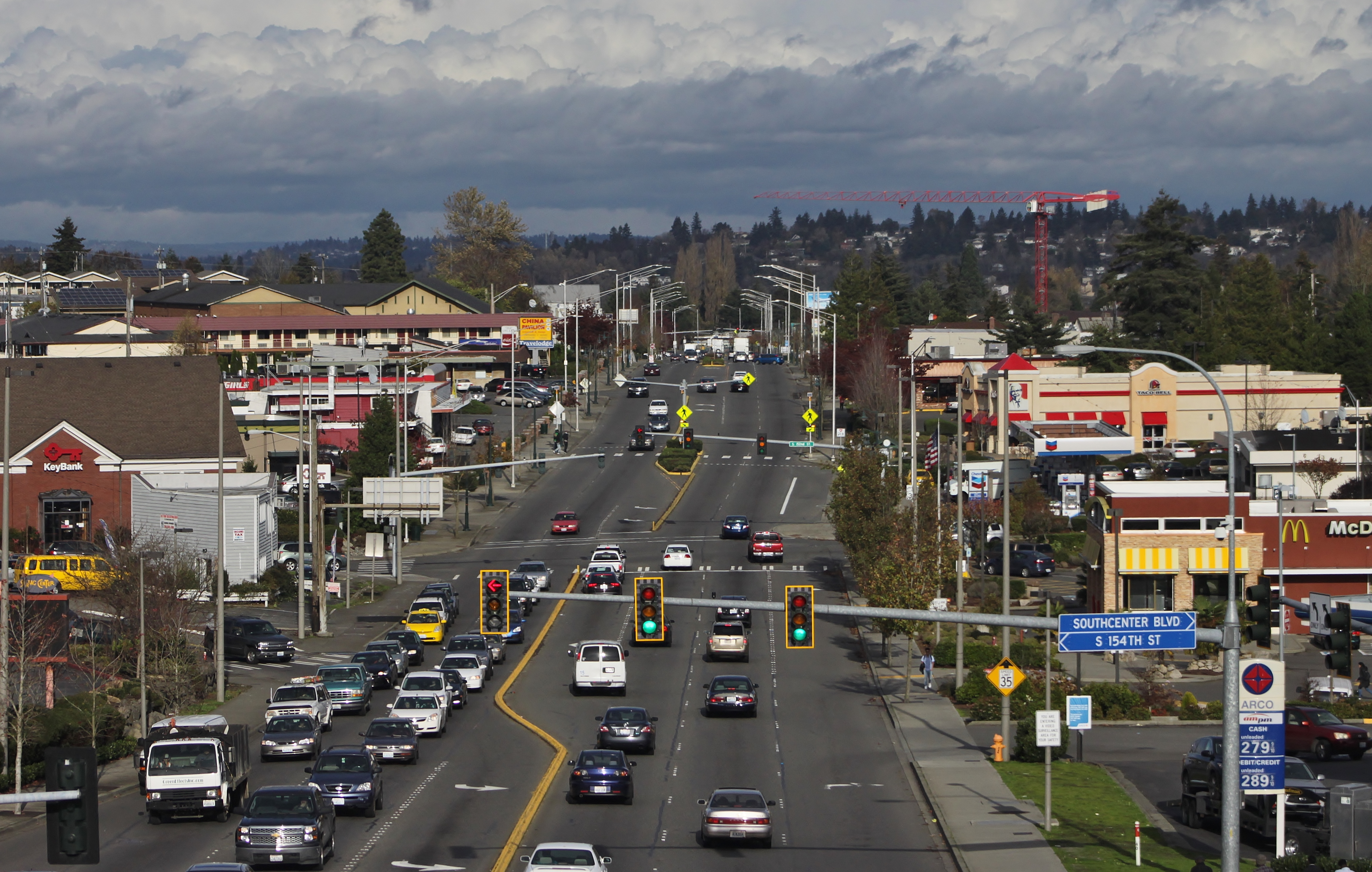
- International Boulevard from 154th Street

- Seal
- Nickname: Hazelnut City
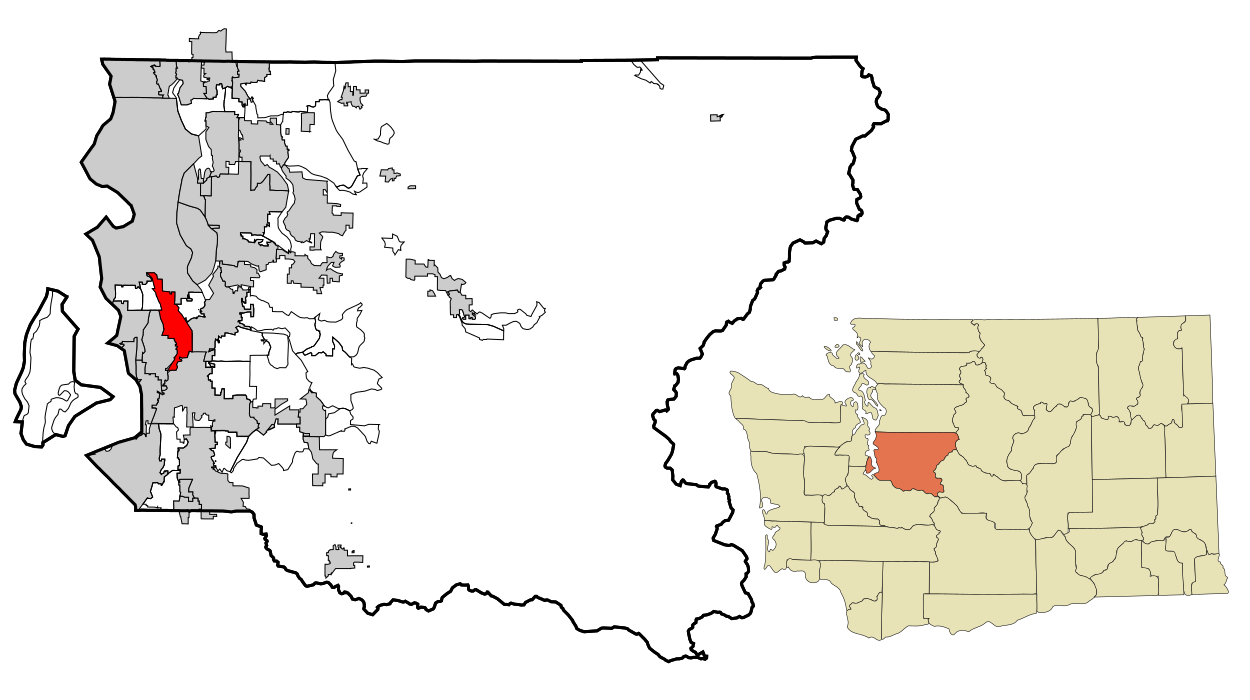
- Location of Tukwila in King County
- Coordinates: 47°28′28″N 122°15′39″W
- Country: United States
- State: Washington
- County: King
- Incorporated: June 23, 1908

Government
  - Type: Mayor–council
  - Mayor: Thomas McLeod

Area
  - Total: 9.60 sq mi (24.86 km^{2})
  - Land: 9.19 sq mi (23.79 km^{2})
  - Water: 0.41 sq mi (1.07 km^{2})
- Elevation: 240 ft (73 m)

Population (2020)
  - Total: 21,798
  - Estimate (2024): 21,636
  - Density: 2,301.2/sq mi (888.49/km^{2})
- Time zone: UTC−8 (Pacific (PST))
  - Summer (DST): UTC−7 (PDT)
- ZIP Codes: 98108, 98138, 98168, 98178, 98188
- Area code(s): 206, 564
- FIPS code: 53-72625
- GNIS feature ID: 2412106
- Website: tukwilawa.gov

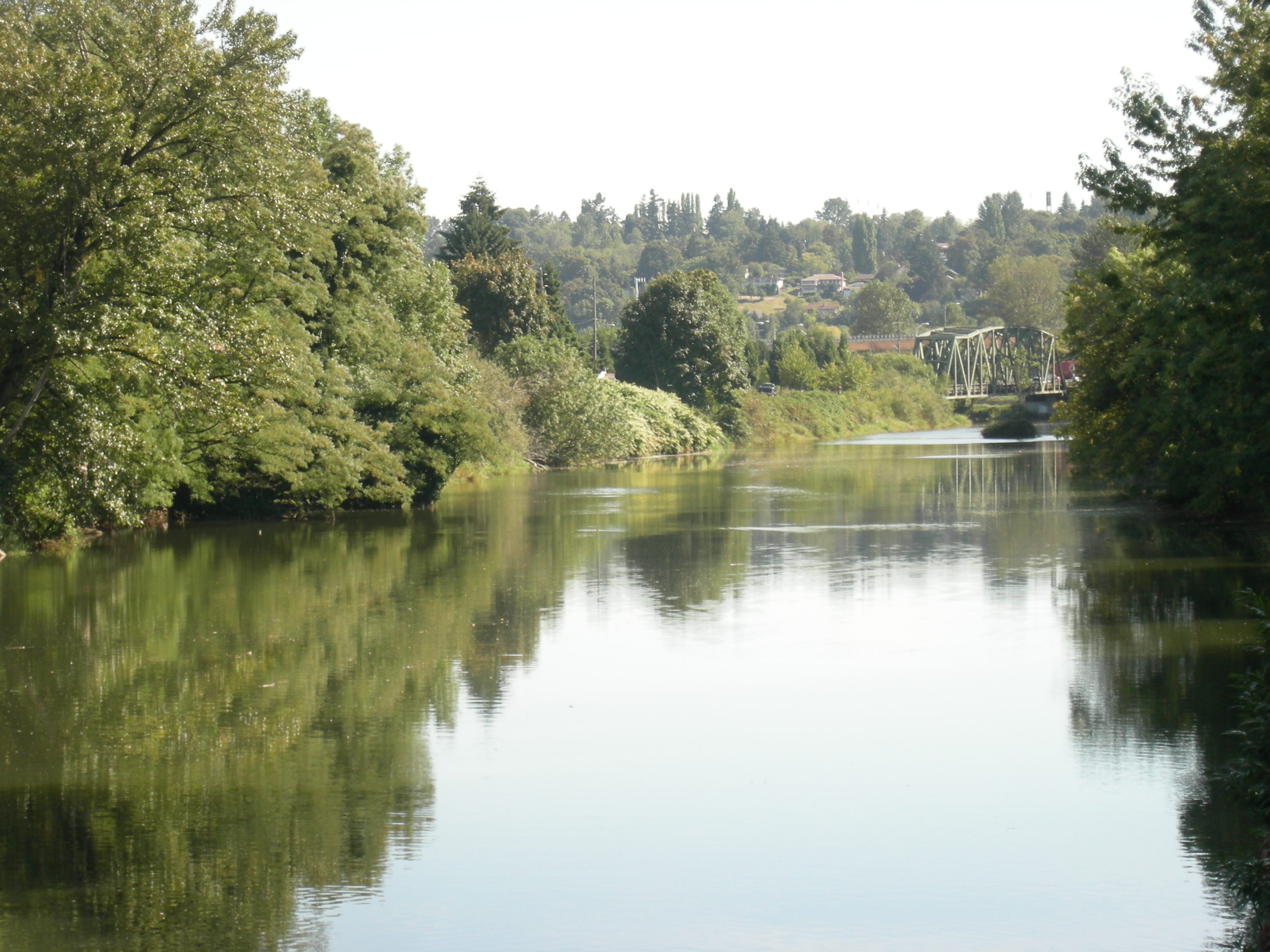
Duwamish River, Tukwila (2007)

Tukwila (/tʌkˈwɪlə/ tuk-WIL-ə) is a suburban city in King County, Washington, United States, located immediately to the south of Seattle. The population was 21,798 at the 2020 census.

A large commercial center draws workers and consumers to the city daily; industry thrives with the confluence of rivers, freeways, railroads, and Seattle–Tacoma International Airport.

== History ==
The earliest people in Tukwila were the Duwamish, who made their homes along the Black and Duwamish rivers. The name "Tukwila" is the Chinook Jargon word for "nut" or "hazelnut", referring to the hazelnut trees that grew in the area. The Duwamish lived in cedar longhouses, hunted and fished, picked wild berries, and used the river for trade with neighboring peoples.

In 1853, the first white settler was Joseph Foster, a Canadian pioneer who had traveled to the Pacific Northwest from Wisconsin. Foster would become known as the "Father of Tukwila" and represented King County in the Washington Territorial Assembly for 22 years. Today, the site of Foster's home on the banks of the Duwamish River is part of Fort Dent Park, which also served as a military base during the Indian Wars of the 1850s. Foster's name is memorialized in the Foster neighborhood of Tukwila, where Foster High School is located.

In the early years, the small village grew into an agricultural center and remained a trading point in the upper Duwamish River Valley. Population began to grow and industry followed, largely farm-oriented commerce. Early electric trains traveled along Interurban Avenue in Tukwila, connecting to Renton and a line to Tacoma. The Interurban Railroad operated a commuter line from 1902 to 1928, making it possible to travel from Seattle to Tacoma in less than an hour. A post office was established in 1904 at Riverton, uphill from the interurban line and directly west of Foster. Centered around Marginal Way and South 130th Street, it is Tukwila's most historically intact neighborhood. The original Tukwila was also settled in 1904, further south along the interurban line where a station was established. The first macadam paved road in Washington state was in Tukwila and bears the name of this new method of street paving. One of the earliest paved military roads in the state passes through the city.

With the main goal of establishing better fire protection and water service, better access to schools and safer roads, Tukwila was incorporated as a fourth-class city on June 14, 1908, with a population of around 450. The original city limits consisted of a single square mile centered around the local interurban depot; Riverton and Foster would be annexed later. The city's first mayor was Joel Shomaker, a newspaperman who gave Tukwila its name soon after his arrival in 1904. Among the city's first council members was Del Adelphia, a famous magician.

== Geography ==
Tukwila is located in western King County, south of Seattle and between the cities of SeaTac to the west and Renton to the east. It lies along the Green River and Interstate 5, which bisect the city from south to north.

According to the United States Census Bureau, the city has a total area of 9.60 square miles (24.86 km^{2}), of which 9.19 square miles (23.80 km^{2}) is land and 0.41 square miles (1.06 km^{2}) is water.

The city's tallest building is the Airmark Apartments and Hotel Interurban, a 19-story residential and hotel building near Southcenter that opened in July 2018. It is the tallest habitable building between Seattle and Tacoma.

=== Neighborhoods ===
Tukwila is divided into several neighborhoods by the city government for planning purposes. The 2015 Comprehensive Land Use Plan identifies them as:

- Allentown
- Cascade View
- Duwamish
- Foster
- Foster Point
- McMicken
- Riverton
- Ryan Hill
- Southcenter (Urban Center)
- Thorndyke
- Tukwila Hill

== Demographics ==
Historical population
Census	Pop.	Note	%±
1910	361		—
1920	453		25.5%
1930	424		−6.4%
1940	521		22.9%
1950	800		53.6%
1960	1,804		125.5%
1970	3,509		94.5%
1980	3,578		2.0%
1990	11,874		231.9%
2000	17,181		44.7%
2010	19,107		11.2%
2020	21,798		14.1%
2024 (est.)	21,636		−0.7%
U.S. Decennial Census; 2020 Census

Tukwila ranked as the most ethnically diverse city in the Pacific Northwest and 11th most in the United States according to a 2012 Brown University study of census data.

As of the 2022 American Community Survey, there are 8,098 estimated households in Tukwila with an average of 2.64 persons per household. The city has a median household income of $76,331. Approximately 13.3% of the city's population lives at or below the poverty line. Tukwila has an estimated 72.4% employment rate, with 25.8% of the population holding a bachelor's degree or higher and 82.1% holding a high school diploma.

The top nine reported ancestries (people were allowed to report up to two ancestries, thus the figures will generally add to more than 100%) were Subsaharan African (8.3%), German (6.0%), English (4.3%), Irish (3.4%), Norwegian (2.2%), Scottish (1.7%), French (except Basque) (1.4%), Italian (1.2%), and Polish (0.5%).

=== Racial and ethnic composition ===
Tukwila, Washington – racial and ethnic composition Note: the US Census treats Hispanic/Latino as an ethnic category. This table excludes Latinos from the racial categories and assigns them to a separate category. Hispanics/Latinos may be of any race.
Race / ethnicity (NH = non-Hispanic)	Pop. 2000	Pop. 2010	Pop. 2020	% 2000	% 2010	% 2020
White alone (NH)	9,297	7,186	6,102	54.11%	37.61%	27.99%
Black or African American alone (NH)	2,174	3,350	4,059	12.65%	17.53%	18.62%
Native American or Alaska Native alone (NH)	190	143	124	1.11%	0.75%	0.57%
Asian alone (NH)	1,858	3,615	5,689	10.81%	18.92%	26.10%
Pacific Islander alone (NH)	311	521	516	1.81%	2.73%	2.37%
Other race alone (NH)	57	49	92	0.33%	0.26%	0.42%
Mixed race or multiracial (NH)	965	894	1,140	5.62%	4.68%	5.23%
Hispanic or Latino (any race)	2,329	3,349	4,076	13.56%	17.53%	18.70%
Total	17,181	19,107	21,798	100.00%	100.00%	100.00%

=== 2020 census ===
As of the 2020 census, there were 21,798 people, 8,168 households, and 4,783 families residing in the city. The population density was 2,373.2 inhabitants per square mile (916.3/km^{2}). There were 8,742 housing units at an average density of 951.8 inhabitants per square mile (367.5/km^{2}). Of those units, 6.6% were vacant with a homeowner vacancy rate of 1.2% and a rental vacancy rate of 7.2%.

100.0% of residents lived in urban areas, while 0.0% lived in rural areas.

The median age was 36.0 years. 21.0% of residents were under the age of 18, 4.7% were under the age of 5, and 11.3% of residents were 65 years of age or older. For every 100 females there were 107.4 males, and for every 100 females age 18 and over there were 108.7 males age 18 and over.

There were 8,168 households, of which 30.5% had children under the age of 18 living in them. Of all households, 37.8% were married-couple households, 27.6% were households with a male householder and no spouse or partner present, and 26.0% were households with a female householder and no spouse or partner present. About 30.8% of all households were made up of individuals and 8.2% had someone living alone who was 65 years of age or older.

=== 2010 census ===
As of the 2010 census, there were 19,107 people, 7,157 households, and 4,124 families living in the city. The population density was 2,083.6 inhabitants per square mile (804.5/km^{2}). There were 7,755 housing units at an average density of 845.7 inhabitants per square mile (326.5/km^{2}). The racial makeup was 43.92% White, 17.89% African American, 1.12% Native American, 19.04% Asian, 2.76% Pacific Islander, 9.27% from some other races and 5.99% from two or more races. Hispanic or Latino people of any race were 17.53% of the population.

There were 7,157 households, of which 33.3% had children under the age of 18 living with them, 36.6% were married couples living together, 13.8% had a female householder with no husband present, 7.2% had a male householder with no wife present, and 42.4% were non-families. 32.2% of all households were made up of individuals, and 5.9% had someone living alone who was 65 years of age or older. The average household size was 2.64 and the average family size was 3.42.

The median age in the city was 33.8 years. 24.2% of residents were under the age of 18; 10.2% were between the ages of 18 and 24; 32.7% were from 25 to 44; 25.1% were from 45 to 64; and 8% were 65 years of age or older. The gender makeup of the city was 51.9% male and 48.1% female.

The median income for a household is $40,718, and the median income for a family of $42,442. Males had a median income of $35,525 versus $28,913 for females. The per capita income for the city was $22,354. About 8.8% of families and 12.7% of the population were below the poverty line, including 18.0% of those under age 18 and 7.7% of those ages 65 or over.

== Economy ==
Tukwila's location at the confluence of rivers, freeways and railroads has made it an important center of commerce. Approximately 45,000 people work in Tukwila. Westfield Southcenter (formerly Southcenter Mall), Puget Sound's largest shopping complex, is located in the city, as are a number of Boeing corporate facilities. Tukwila is also the location of corporate datacenters, including those of Microsoft, Internap, the University of Washington, Savvis, AboveNet, digital.forest, HopOne, and Fortress Colocation. Most of these are located at Sabey Corporation's Intergate Seattle campus near Boeing Field.

In 2021, Seagle Properties announced sales for the Prato District, a 320-acre (130 ha) mixed-use office, manufacturing, and retail area south of Southcenter. Preparations for the development, which began in 2009 as Tukwila South, included an extension of Southcenter Parkway built by the city government in 2012.

=== Top employers ===
According to the city's 2022 Annual Comprehensive Financial Report, the largest employers in the city are:

#	Employer	Product or Business	# of Employees	Percentage
1	Boeing Employee's Credit Union	Credit Union	1,063	3.76%
2	King County Department of Natural Resources	Government	701	2.48%
3	Boeing Company	Aircraft Manufacturing	587	2.08%
4	Prime Now LLC	Electronic Shopping	569	2.02%
5	King County Housing Authority	Housing Assistance	519	1.84%
6	Nordstrom, Inc.	Department Stores	465	1.65%
7	Costco	Warehouse Club	419	1.48%
8	Cascade Behavioral Hospital LLC	Healthcare	325	1.15%
9	Amazon	E Commerce	315	1.12%
10	Sound Mental Health (2 locations)	Healthcare	288	1.02%
—	Total employers	—	5,251	18.60%

== Government and politics ==
Presidential election results
Year	Democratic	Republican	Third Parties
2024	67.04% 4,752	28.98% 2,054	3.98% 282
2020	73.65% 6,107	23.65% 1,961	2.70% 224
2016	70.71% 4,348	20.83% 1,281	8.46% 520

The city of Tukwila leans overwhelmingly Democratic like its neighbor Seattle and King County as a whole. It cast nearly three-quarters of its ballots for Joe Biden in the 2020 United States presidential election and more than two-thirds of its ballots for Kamala Harris in the 2024 United States presidential election.

== Education ==
Tukwila School District, which covers the vast majority of the city, has five schools: Cascade View Elementary School, Thorndyke Elementary School, Tukwila Elementary School, Showalter Middle School, and Foster High School. Foster High School is among the most racially diverse schools in the United States, with students from 50 countries speaking 45 languages as of 2016.

Also in the city is Raisbeck Aviation High School, a public technical school operated by the Highline Public Schools that opened in 2004. Other portions of the city are in the boundaries of the Highline Public Schools, Renton School District, Kent School District, and Seattle Public Schools.

== Sports ==
The Seattle Seawolves, two-time champions of Major League Rugby, had played their home games at the Starfire Sports complex since 2018. The complex also served as the administrative and training home of the Seattle Sounders FC, and the main ground of their affiliate the Tacoma Defiance, until their move to Longacres in 2024. Seattle Reign FC moved their training facilities to Starfire in 2023 and will expand in the former Sounders space.

== Culture ==
The Museum of Flight is an air and space museum located in the extreme northern part of Tukwila, adjacent to Boeing Field. Tukwila is also home to the Rainier Symphony, which conducts several performances each year at the Foster Performing Arts Center in Tukwila.

== Transportation ==
The city is served by Amtrak Cascades and Sound Transit's Sounder commuter rail at Tukwila station, while Sound Transit's Link light rail service serves Tukwila International Boulevard station.

== Notable residents ==
- Jacob Castro, soccer player
- William Cumming, artist and political activist
- Zack Hudgins, former member of the Washington House of Representatives
- Jim North, NFL player for the Washington Commanders
- Mario Segale, real estate developer and namesake of video game character Mario
