= Jack Banta (American football) =

American football player (1917–1977)

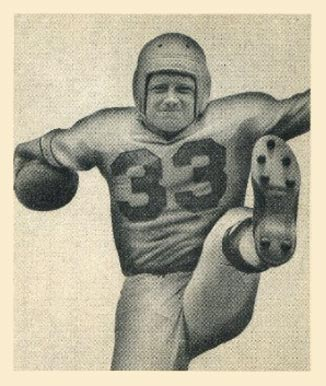
- Banta on a 1948 Bowman football card

No. 46, 33
- Position: Halfback

Personal information
- Born: November 19, 1917; Los Angeles, California, U.S.
- Died: February 22, 1977 (aged 59); Newport Beach, California, U.S.
- Listed height: 5 ft 11 in (1.80 m)
- Listed weight: 191 lb (87 kg)

Career information
- High school: Los Angeles
- College: USC (1937-1940)
- NFL draft: 1941: 10th round, 110th overall pick

Career history
- Washington Redskins (1941); Philadelphia Eagles (1941, 1944–1945); Los Angeles Rams (1946–1948)

Career NFL statistics
- Rushing yards: 847
- Rushing average: 4.3
- Receptions: 30
- Receiving yards: 373
- Total touchdowns: 7
- Stats at Pro Football Reference

Herbert Jack Banta (November 19, 1917 – February 22, 1977) was an American professional football halfback in the National Football League (NFL) for the Philadelphia Eagles, the Washington Redskins and Los Angeles Rams. He played college football at the University of Southern California for Howard Jones and was drafted in the tenth round of the 1941 NFL draft. He served as a Lieutenant (junior grade) in the Navy during the World War II era.

== NFL career statistics ==
Legend
**Bold**	Career high

Year	Team	Games		Rushing					Receiving				
Year	Team	GP	GS	Att	Yds	Avg	Lng	TD	Rec	Yds	Avg	Lng	TD
1941	WAS	1	0	2	1	0.5	-	0	0	0	0.0	0	0
1941	PHI	6	5	27	92	3.4	31	1	2	42	**21.0**	37	0
1944	PHI	7	2	38	198	**5.2**	**60**	**3**	1	8	8.0	8	0
1945	PHI	5	1	15	49	3.3	22	1	1	10	10.0	10	0
1946	RAM	10	6	**44**	**209**	4.8	25	0	8	81	10.1	32	**1**
1947	RAM	12	8	40	193	4.8	23	1	**14**	**198**	14.1	**64**	0
1948	RAM	12	10	32	105	3.3	14	0	4	34	8.5	14	0
		53	32	198	847	4.3	60	6	30	373	12.4	64	1
