= Dale Prather =

American football player (1910–1973)

- Prather, circa 1937

No. 20, 12, 30, 31
- Positions: End, tackle

Personal information
- Born: September 19, 1910; Eureka, Kansas, U.S.
- Died: September 22, 1973 (aged 63); Questa, New Mexico, U.S.
- Listed height: 6 ft 2 in (1.88 m)
- Listed weight: 190 lb (86 kg)

Career information
- High school: Eureka
- College: Fort Scott (1930); Kansas (1931); College of Emporia (1932); George Washington (1933–1936)

Career history
- Baltimore Orioles (1936); Washington Redskins (1937); Cleveland Rams (1937); Boston Shamrocks (1937); Cleveland Rams (1938); St. Louis Gunners (1939); Columbus Bullies (1939)

Awards and highlights
- APFA champion (1939)
- Stats at Pro Football Reference

Dale Lambert Prather (September 19, 1910 – September 22, 1973) was an American professional football player for the Cleveland Rams of the National Football League (NFL). He played college football for the Fort Scott Greyhounds, Kansas Jayhawks, College of Emporia Fighting Presbies, and George Washington Colonials. He also played college basketball at Fort Scott and Emporia, and spent some time as an amateur boxer. Prather was on George Washington's freshman football team in 1933 despite having been listed as a junior the prior year at Emporia. In addition to the NFL, he played pro football in the Dixie League, American Football League (AFL), and American Professional Football Association (APFA).

== Early life ==
Dale Lambert Prather was born on September 19, 1910, in Eureka, Kansas. He attended St. John's Military School, with his final year being in 1928. In 1929, he played high school football at Eureka High School as a tackle. Prather was also part of the track team at Eureka.

== College career ==
Prather began his college football career in 1930 as a tackle for the Greyhounds of Fort Scott Junior College. He also played college basketball for the Greyhounds. In 1931, he transferred to the University of Kansas, where he spent the 1931 season on the Jayhawks' freshman football team. Prather was an Amateur Athletic Union boxer while at Kansas. In 1932, he transferred to the College of Emporia, where he played tackle on the Fighting Presbies football team and center on the basketball team during the 1932 season. He was named second-team all-state in football while at Emporia. In June 1933, it was reported that Prather had been ruled ineligible for the 1933 season due to poor grades.

Prather enrolled at George Washington University to play tackle for the Colonials. Despite being reported as a junior in 1932 while at Emporia, Prather was on the freshman football team at George Washington University in 1933. He was then a three-year varsity letterman for the Colonials from 1934 to 1936. In spring 1934, he won The Washington Herald's first annual Golden Gloves heavyweight boxing championship. Before the 1934 football season, Prather, who was working with the second-team at the time, impressed Colonials head coach Jim Pixlee. Pixlee stated "I consider Prather to be [the] best line prospect to come before me at George Washington." Prather remained a backup tackle to start the 1934 season, and made his first career start for George Washington at fullback on October 12, 1934, against The Citadel, after the former starter Bill Brewer was benched. Prather rushed 15 times for 50 yards against The Citadel. He moved back to tackle later in the year. In August 1935, Prather underwent surgery for appendicitis. After the third game of the 1935 season, Prather was benched for poor play. The Washington Herald speculated that it might have been due to his appendicitis operation. He returned to the starting lineup a few games later and earned honorable mention all-district honors for the 1935 season. Prather was named second-team All-D.C. for the 1936 season. He worked part-time in a brewery while at George Washington.

== Professional career ==
After the 1936 college season ended, Prather started one game at left tackle for the Baltimore Orioles of the Dixie League in December 1936 before leaving the team to return home to Kansas.

Prather was signed by the Washington Redskins of the National Football League (NFL) on February 16, 1937. After the regular season opener on September 16, in which Prather did not play, the Redskins sold him to the Cleveland Rams. He was expected to be in the lineup for the Rams' game against the Philadelphia Eagles on September 21 but did not end up playing in it. After impressing Rams head coach Hugo Bezdek during practice, Prather was also expected to play in the Brooklyn Dodgers game on September 26 but did not play in that game either.

On September 28, 1937, Prather signed with the Boston Shamrocks of the American Football League (AFL), a competitor to the NFL. He played in six games, starting three, during the 1937 AFL season and caught one touchdown. He was listed at end, tackle, and guard during the season.

In August 1938, Prather signed with the Cleveland Rams for the 1938 season. On September 25, 1938, he made his only career NFL start (at end) against the Washington Redskins. He received some attention for a photograph that circulated of him trying to tackle Max Krause by the jaw during the Redskins game. Prather played in six or seven games, starting one, for the Rams in 1938. He was released on August 26, 1939.

Prather played in two games, starting one, at tackle for the St. Louis Gunners of the American Professional Football Association (APFA) in 1939. He finished the 1939 APFA season with the Columbus Bullies, appearing in ten games while starting five at tackle. On January 7, 1940, the Bullies were announced as league champions with a 9–2 record.

== Personal life ==
Prather was the nephew of John E. Erickson, the governor of Montana. Prather married Dorothy Flanagin on August 20, 1938. On November 22, 1939, Prather, Columbus Bullies teammate Bob Davis, and brothers Wilbur and Morton Braden were arrested for allegedly sexually assaulting a 16-year-old girl. Prather was released from jail the next day after the girl was unable to identify him. The other three men went on trial in January 1940. On February 13, 1940, Wilbur Braden was sentenced to five years probation while Morton Braden and Davis were exonerated.

Prather served in the United States Navy during World War II. In 1955, he began living in Elkhart, Kansas, after obtaining employment with the Halliburton Oil Company. He was a Freemason and a member of the Lutheran church. Prather later became the probate judge of Morton County, Kansas. He died on September 22, 1973, in Questa, New Mexico, after suffering a heart attack during a fishing trip.
