= Frank Kimble =

American football player (1917–2001)

No. 60
- Position: End

Personal information
- Born: November 9, 1917; Williamson, West Virginia, U.S.
- Died: February 12, 2001 (aged 83); Williamson, West Virginia, U.S.
- Listed height: 6 ft 5 in (1.96 m)
- Listed weight: 205 lb (93 kg)

Career information
- High school: Williamson
- College: West Virginia

Career history
- Pittsburgh Steelers (1945)
- Stats at Pro Football Reference

Frank Kimble (November 9, 1917 – February 12, 2001) was an American professional football end who played for the Pittsburgh Steelers of the National Football League (NFL). He played college football for the West Virginia Mountaineers.

== Early life ==
Frank Kimble was born on November 9, 1917, in Williamson, West Virginia. He attended Williamson High School.

== College career ==
Kimble played college football for the West Virginia Mountaineers, earning a varsity letter in 1941. He also spent time in the United States Army.

== Professional career ==
Kimble signed with the Pittsburgh Steelers in 1945. He impressed the coaching staff during training camp and was anticipated as a starter at end. However, he decided to quit football before the preseason finale. He missed the regular season opener and then decided to return to the team, this time in a reserve role. Kimble played in nine of ten games, starting three overall, for the Steelers in 1945 and caught two passes for 16 yards.

On August 19, 1946, Kimble was kneed in the back during practice, suffering a crack in his second lumbar vertebrae. The Pittsburgh Press reported that he would be hospitalized for at least a week and out of football action indefinitely.

== Personal life ==
Kimble died on February 12, 2001, in Williamson.
