= Sid Carroll (American football) =

American football executive (1915–1995)

Personal information
- Born: December 9, 1915; Washington, D.C., U.S.
- Died: May 7, 1995 (aged 79); Alexandria, Virginia, U.S.

Career history
- Washington Redskins (1937–1939) Ticket office manager; Washington Redskins (1940–1942) Business manager; Washington Redskins (1943–1946) General manager

Sidney Ashby Carroll (December 9, 1915 – May 7, 1995) was an American sports executive who served as general manager of the Washington Redskins of the National Football League (NFL) from 1943 to 1947. He also worked as an editor at The Washington Post for 25 years.

== Early life ==
Carroll was born in Washington, D.C. and graduated from Washington and Lee High School. While attending George Washington University he worked on the sports staff of The Washington Times. He lost his job when the closure of another Hearst paper resulted in a number of senior writers, including Bob Addie, joining the Times. He worked for the Army and Navy Journal until 1936, when his former boss at the Times, George Preston Marshall, hired him to work for the Washington Redskins of the National Football League (NFL).

== Washington Redskins ==
Carroll worked closely with Redskins general manager Jack Espey on the team's promotional efforts. He became the team's business manager in 1940 and succeeded Espey as general manager three years later. At 27, Carroll was the youngest GM in the NFL. He resigned in 1947 to become the Northern Virginia distributor for Frigidaire.

== The Washington Post ==
In 1953, Carroll joined the Washington Times-Herald as a copy editor on its sports desk. The paper was acquired by The Washington Post the following year and he joined The Post a sports copy editor and occasional football and golf columnist. He retired from the paper in 1979.

== Golf ==
Carroll was a noted amateur golfer who was twice a finalist for the Washington Golf and Country Club championship and thrice competed in the United States Amateur Championship. He served as president of the District of Columbia Golf Association and the Middle Atlantic Golf Association.
