= Ellis Jones (American football) =

American football player (1921–2002)

No. 27
- Positions: Guard, linebacker

Personal information
- Born: March 16, 1921; Abilene, Texas, U.S.
- Died: February 24, 2002 (aged 80); Greeley, Colorado, U.S.
- Listed height: 6 ft 0 in (1.83 m)
- Listed weight: 190 lb (86 kg)

Career information
- College: Tulsa (1942–1944)
- NFL draft: 1945: 8th round, 69th overall pick

Career history
- Boston Yanks (1945)

Awards and highlights
- First-team All-American (1944); Tulsa Golden Hurricane Jersey No. 31 retired

Career NFL statistics
- Games played: 8
- Stats at Pro Football Reference

Ellis Nathaniel Jones (March 16, 1921 – February 24, 2002) was an American professional football player who appeared in eight games for the Boston Yanks of the National Football League in 1945. He only had one arm.
