= John Naioti =

American football player (1921–1990)

Profile
- Position: Halfback

Personal information
- Born: November 6, 1921; Fulton, New York, US
- Died: September 5, 1990 (aged 68); Las Vegas, Nevada, US
- Listed height: 5 ft 10 in (1.78 m)
- Listed weight: 180 lb (82 kg)

Career information
- College: Saint Francis University

Career history
- 1942 and 1945: Pittsburgh Steelers
- Stats at Pro Football Reference

John F. Naioti (1921–1990) was a professional football player in the National Football League. He graduated from Saint Francis University, Loretto, Pennsylvania in 1942.

He played in the National Football League for the Pittsburgh Steelers in 1942. He then went into the Army Air Corp during World War II. He was a first lieutenant navigator and a member of the 603rd Squadron. On August 16, 1944, he flew on a mission from Nuthampstead, England to Delitzsch, Germany. He completed his 32 combat missions on August 26, 1944, after a flight over Gelsenkirchen, Germany.

After completion of his military service, he returned to the Pittsburgh Steelers and played in 1945. In 1945 he also kicked four point after touchdowns.

According to his widow, he was offered a contract by the Pittsburgh Steelers for 1946 but decided to retire due to pain from his war injuries.
