= Art Albrecht =

American football player (1921–2004)

No. 46
- Positions: Center, tackle, linebacker

Personal information
- Born: December 29, 1921; Manitowoc, Wisconsin, US
- Died: February 1, 2004 (aged 82); Green Bay, Wisconsin, US

Career information
- High school: Lincoln (Manitowoc)
- College: Wisconsin
- NFL draft: 1942: undrafted

Career history
- Pittsburgh Steelers (1942); Chicago Cardinals (1943); Boston Yanks (1944)

Career NFL statistics
- Games played: 14
- Stats at Pro Football Reference

Arthur Walter Albrecht (December 29, 1921 – February 1, 2004) was an American professional football offensive lineman and linebacker in the National Football League (NFL).
