= Joe Crowley (American football) =

American football player (1919–)

- Crowley as a high school coach in 1973

No. 15
- Position: End

Personal information
- Born: April 9, 1919; Boston, Massachusetts, U.S.
- Died: January 22, 2008 (aged 88); Scituate, Massachusetts, U.S.
- Listed height: 6 ft 0 in (1.83 m)
- Listed weight: 194 lb (88 kg)

Career information
- High school: Boston Latin
- College: Dartmouth
- NFL draft: 1943: undrafted

Career history
- Boston Yanks (1944–1945)
- Stats at Pro Football Reference

Joseph A. Crowley (April 6, 1919 – January 22, 2008) was an American professional football end who played for the Boston Yanks of the National Football League (NFL). He played college football for the Dartmouth Indians. He was later a successful high school football coach in Massachusetts.

== Early life ==
Joseph A. Crowley was born on April 6, 1919, in the Brighton neighborhood of Boston, Massachusetts. He played high school football at Boston Latin School as an end for three years. He was team captain in 1937. Crowley set the state indoor record in the 300-yard dash in 1936 with a time of 33 seconds "flat". After high school, he spent a post-graduate year at The Kiski School.

== College career ==
Crowley was recruited by Columbia, Dartmouth, Yale, and Michigan to play college football. He decided to enroll at Dartmouth College. He was a three-year varsity letterman for the Indians from 1940 to 1942. Crowley was on the field during the famous Fifth Down Game in 1940. He graduated from Dartmouth in 1943.

== Professional career ==
Crowley played in nine or ten games (all starts) for the Boston Yanks of the National Football League (NFL) in 1944, totaling 13 receptions for 279 yards and three touchdowns, one rushing attempt for ten yards, and one interception on defense for five yards. He led the team in receiving yards and was tied with Keith Ranspot for the team-lead in receiving touchdowns. The Yanks finished the year with a 2–8 record.

Crowley appeared in nine of ten games (starting three) for Boston in 1945, catching one pass for 12 yards while also recording one interception for 45 yards.

== Coaching career ==
While playing for the Yanks, Crowley was also a coach and math teacher at Thayer Academy in Braintree, Massachusetts. He was the head football coach at Reading High School in Reading, Massachusetts, from 1946 to 1954. He became the head coach at South Boston High School in 1955 and remained there for 22 years. He was later the head coach at Archbishop Williams High School from 1980 to 1981. In his final game in 1981, he secured his 200th victory as a head coach.

== Legacy and personal life ==
Crowley was inducted into the Massachusetts High School Football Coaches Hall of Fame in the mid-1970s. In 1987, he was inducted into Boston Latin's athletics hall of fame as part of the inaugural class. He died of heart failure on January 22, 2008, in Scituate, Massachusetts.
