= John Smith (tackle) =

American football player

No. 83
- Position: Tackle

Personal information
- Born: United States
- Listed height: 6 ft 2 in (1.88 m)
- Listed weight: 200 lb (91 kg)

Career information
- College: Florida

Career history
- Philadelphia Eagles (1945)

Career statistics
- Games played: 1
- Stats at Pro Football Reference

John G. Smith Jr. was an American football tackle who played one season for the Philadelphia Eagles of the National Football League (NFL). He went to college at Florida. He was 6 feet, 2 inches tall, and 200 pounds. Smith appeared in just one game during his professional career.
