= Vern Foltz =

American football player (1918–1947)

No. 26
- Positions: Tackle, center

Personal information
- Born: August 27, 1918; Clearfield, Pennsylvania, U.S.
- Died: December 31, 1947 (aged 29); Greensburg, Pennsylvania, U.S.

Career information
- College: St. Vincent

Career history
- 1944: Washington Redskins
- 1945: Pittsburgh Steelers

Vernon Jay Foltz (August 27, 1918 – December 31, 1947) was an American football offensive lineman in the National Football League for the Washington Redskins and the Pittsburgh Steelers. Born in Clearfield, Pennsylvania, he attended St. Vincent College.

Foltz served in the United States Marines during World War II. He died of a self-inflicted gunshot wound to the temple on New Year's Eve 1947.
