= Sam Goldman =

American football player (1916–1978)

No. 42, 70, 85
- Position: End

Personal information
- Born: November 6, 1916; Cleveland, Ohio, U.S.
- Died: November 8, 1978 (aged 62); Pensacola, Florida, U.S.
- Listed height: 6 ft 3 in (1.91 m)
- Listed weight: 228 lb (103 kg)

Career information
- High school: John Adams (OH)
- College: Ohio State; Samford

Career history
- Boston Yanks (1944–1947); Chicago Cardinals (1948); Detroit Lions (1949)

Career statistics
- Games played: 46
- Receptions: 18
- Receiving yards: 184
- Touchdowns: 0
- Stats at Pro Football Reference

Samuel Goldman (November 9, 1916 – November 8, 1978) was an American football end who played professionally for the Boston Yanks, Chicago Cardinals, and Detroit Lions of the National Football League. Born in Cleveland, Ohio, Goldman played college football at Samford University and Ohio State University. He stood 6'3" and weighed 228 pounds.
