= Scotty Gudmundson =

American football player (1921–2012)

- Gudmundson, circa 1944

No. 18, 33, 26
- Position: Quarterback

Personal information
- Born: April 3, 1921; Ogden, Utah, U.S.
- Died: August 17, 2012 (aged 91); Hot Springs, Arkansas, U.S.
- Listed height: 5 ft 10 in (1.78 m)
- Listed weight: 178 lb (81 kg)

Career information
- High school: Ogden
- College: George Washington

Career history
- Washington Redskins (1944)*; Boston Yanks (1944–1945); Los Angeles Bulldogs (1946–1947)
- * Offseason or practice squad member only
- Stats at Pro Football Reference

Wayne Scott Gudmundson (April 3, 1921 – August 17, 2012) was an American professional football player who was a quarterback for the Boston Yanks of the National Football League (NFL). He played college football for the George Washington Colonials.

== Early life ==
Wayne Scott Gudmundson was born on April 3, 1921, in Ogden, Utah. He played football, baseball, and basketball at Ogden High School.

== College career ==
Gudmundson was offered baseball contracts by the St. Louis Browns, Detroit Tigers, and Cincinnati Reds but instead chose to enroll George Washington University in 1939 on a football scholarship. He was a member of the Colonials football team from 1939 to 1941. In spring 1941, he was considering signing with the Brooklyn Dodgers to play baseball but ended up having an appendectomy. Gudmundson also golfed for the Colonials. During college, he worked in the identification division of the FBI at nights.

== Professional career ==
In May 1944, Gudmundson signed with the Washington Redskins as the backup to Sammy Baugh. On October 3, 1944, Gudmundson's contract was purchased by the Boston Yanks. He played in 17 games, starting four, for the Yanks from 1944 to 1945, completing 33 of 81 passes (40.7%) for 525 yards, two touchdowns, and nine interceptions. He also punted 29 times for 1,014 yards, made two interceptions on defense, returned five punts for 63 yards, and returned three kicks for 55 yards.

Gudmundson played for the Los Angeles Bulldogs of the Pacific Coast Professional Football League from 1946 to 1947. He scored six passing touchdowns and one rushing touchdown in 1947, and two passing touchdowns in 1947.

== Personal life ==
Gudmundson retired from pro football to work for North American Aviation, for which he would later serve as personnel director. Afterwards, he became a director of sales in the cemetery business, starting first at several cemeteries in California before eventually moving to Arkansas to work with Pine Crest Cemetery. Gudmundson died on August 17, 2012, in Hot Springs, Arkansas.
