= Jim North =

American football player (1919–2003)

No. 42
- Position: Offensive tackle

Personal information
- Born: August 11, 1919; Tukwila, Washington
- Died: February 4, 2003 (aged 83)

Career information
- College: Central Washington

Career history
- 1944: Washington Redskins

James Morris North (August 11, 1919 – February 4, 2003) was an American professional football offensive lineman in the National Football League for the Washington Redskins. He played college football at Central Washington University. After his retirement from professional football, North coached at Mount Si High School in Snoqualmie, Washington.

His wife, Frances, served as a member of the Washington House of Representatives from 1973 to 1983, and led campaigns to save Mount Si from development. She died in March 2003, one month after her husband.
