= Everett Sharp =

American football player (1918–1996)

No. 16
- Position: Offensive tackle

Personal information
- Born: June 25, 1918; Corinth, Mississippi, U.S.
- Died: February 1996 (age 77); North Beach, Maryland, U.S.

Career information
- College: Cal Poly (Pomona)

Career history
- 1944–1945: Washington Redskins
- Stats at Pro Football Reference

Everett A. Sharp (June 25, 1918 – February 1996) was an American football offensive tackle in the National Football League for the Washington Redskins. He attended California State Polytechnic University, Pomona.
