= Morgan Tiller =

American football player and coach (1918–1983)

Profile
- Position: End

Personal information
- Born: October 13, 1918; Trinidad, Colorado, U.S.
- Died: December 6, 1983 (aged 65); Oakton, Virginia, U.S.
- Listed height: 6 ft 1 in (1.85 m)
- Listed weight: 195 lb (88 kg)

Career information
- College: Denver

Career history

Playing
- Boston Yanks (1944); Pittsburgh Steelers (1945)

Coaching
- Hampden–Sydney (1947–1950) (head coach)
- Stats at Pro Football Reference

Morgan John Tiller (October 13, 1918 – December 6, 1983) was an American football player and coach. He played professionally for two seasons in the National Football League (NFL), with the Boston Yanks in 1944 and the Pittsburgh Steelers in 1945. Tiller appeared in a total of 14 career games.

== Head coaching record ==
Year	Team	Overall	Conference	Standing	Bowl/playoffs
Hampden–Sydney Tigers (Mason–Dixon Conference) (1947–1948)
1947	Hampden–Sydney	2–7	2–2	4th	
1948	Hampden–Sydney	6–2–1	2–0	2nd	
Hampden–Sydney Tigers (Mason–Dixon Conference / Virginia Little Six Conference) (1949–1950)
1949	Hampden–Sydney	5–4	2–1 / 1–1	T–2nd / 2nd	
1950	Hampden–Sydney	4–5	1–3 / 0–2	7th / 4th	
Hampden–Sydney:		17–18–1	7–8		
Total:		17–18–1			
