= Charlie Behan =

American football player (1920–1945)

Profile
- Position: End

Personal information
- Born: August 4, 1920; Crystal Lake, Illinois, U.S.
- Died: May 18, 1945 (aged 24); Okinawa, Japan †

Career information
- College: Northern Illinois

Career history
- 1942: Detroit Lions

Other information
- Military career
- Allegiance: United States
- Branch: United States Marine Corps
- Rank: First Lieutenant
- Unit: Sixth Marine Division
- Conflicts: World War II: Pacific War; Volcano and Ryukyu Islands campaign; Battle of Okinawa †

Charles Edward Behan (August 4, 1920 – May 18, 1945) was an American professional football player. He was an end for one season for the Detroit Lions.

== Football career ==
Behan caught 4 passes for 63 yards in 1942, his only year with the Lions.

Behan enlisted in the U.S. Armed Forces in 1942 and served in the United States Marine Corps during World War II. Prior to his overseas deployment, he played for the football team at Marine Corps Base Camp Lejeune. In late 1944, when Behan was fighting with the newly reformed Sixth Marine Division on the island of Guadalcanal, he played in a hard-hitting "touch" football game on Christmas Eve between teams representing the 4th and 29th Regiments. Behan was the 29th Marines' player-coach and team captain in what the roster sheets passed out that day labeled "The Football Classic." The game ended in a scoreless tie.

== Death at Okinawa ==
Most Marine players and spectators involved in "The Football Classic" were shipped to Okinawa in April 1945. During the Okinawa campaign, Behan took part in the Battle of Sugar Loaf Hill. During the battle he was hit with shrapnel in the mouth. Insisting to stay on the front lines, Behan applied cotton to his mouth and changed it out regularly. After tossing grenades at a Japanese machine gun nest, Behan was hit by machine-gun fire and died.

Behan was posthumously awarded the Navy Cross.
