= Thron Riggs =

American football player (1921–2015)

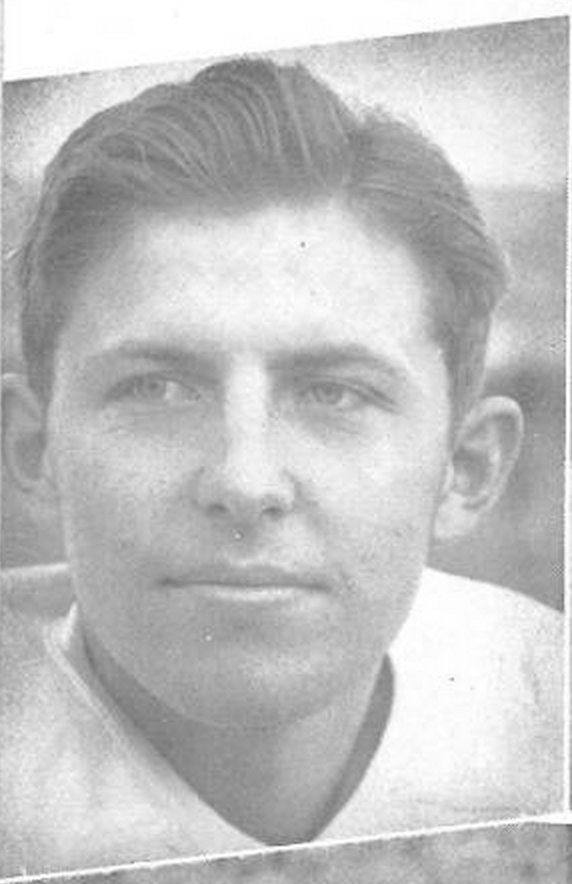
- Riggs pictured c. 1942 at the University of Washington

Profile
- Position: Tackle

Personal information
- Born: April 25, 1921; Buckley, Washington
- Died: November 2015 (aged 94); Tempe, Arizona
- Listed height: 6 ft 1 in (1.85 m)
- Listed weight: 225 lb (102 kg)

Career information
- High school: Buckley (WA)
- College: Washington

Career history
- Boston Yanks (1944)
- Stats at Pro Football Reference

Thron X. Riggs (April 25, 1921 – November 2015) was an American football tackle who played one season with the Boston Yanks. He played college football at the University of Washington, having previously attended Buckley High School in Buckley, Washington. He later worked in the oil business and was a general manager of the Chevron Pascagoula Refinery. He was also a World War II veteran, having served with the United States Marine Corps. He died in November 2015.
