= Floyd Rhea =

American football player (1920–2010)

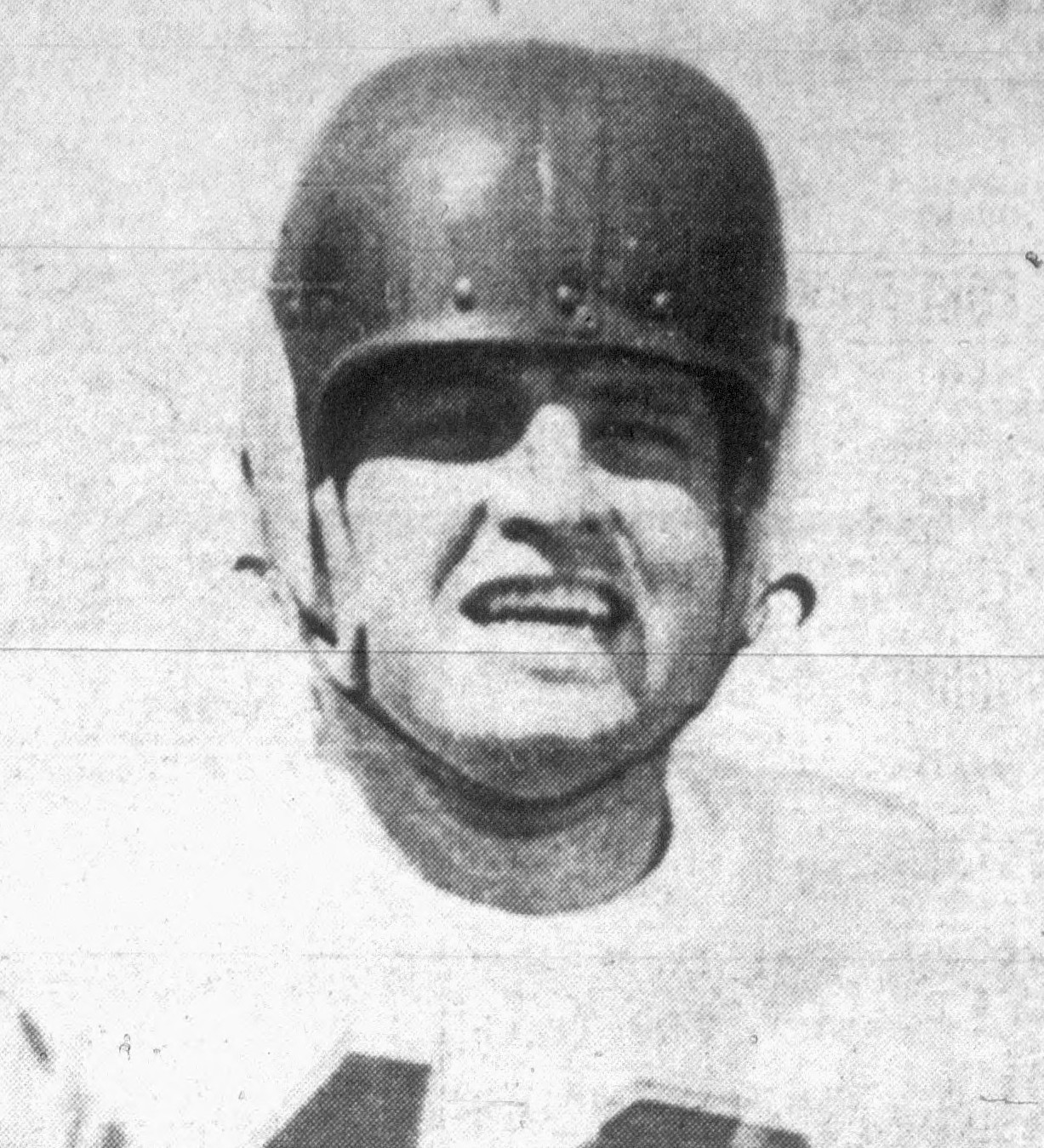
- Rhea, circa 1942

No. 64, 24, 42, 34
- Position: Guard

Personal information
- Born: September 28, 1920; Rhea's Mills, Arkansas, U.S.
- Died: December 12, 2010 (aged 90); Seal Beach, California, U.S.
- Listed height: 6 ft 0 in (1.83 m)
- Listed weight: 218 lb (99 kg)

Career information
- High school: Fullerton Union (Fullerton, California)
- College: Oregon
- NFL draft: 1943: 15th round, 134th overall pick

Career history
- Chicago Cardinals (1943); Brooklyn Tigers (1944); Boston Yanks (1945); Detroit Lions (1947)

Career NFL statistics
- Games played: 19
- Games started: 7
- Interceptions: 1
- Stats at Pro Football Reference

Floyd Mack Rhea (1920–2010) was an American professional football player who played offensive lineman for six seasons for the Chicago Cardinals, Brooklyn Tigers, Boston Yanks, and Detroit Lions.

Rhea was a standout athlete at Fullerton Union High School.
