= Tony Falkenstein (American football) =

American football player (1915–1994)

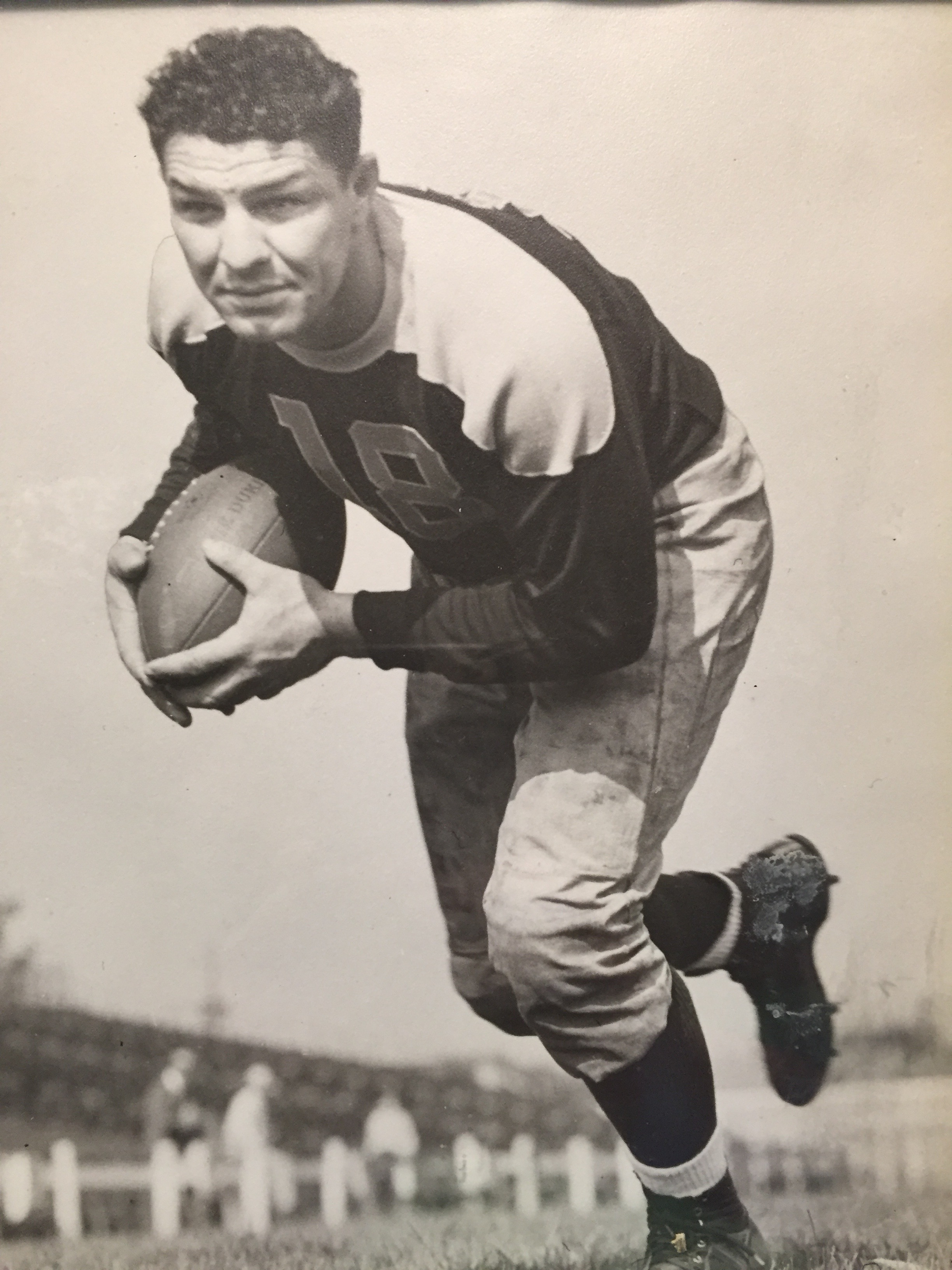

No. 18, 32, 25
- Position: Fullback

Personal information
- Born: February 16, 1915; Pueblo, Colorado, U.S.
- Died: October 9, 1994 (aged 79); Ceres, California, U.S.
- Listed height: 5 ft 10 in (1.78 m)
- Listed weight: 205 lb (93 kg)

Career information
- High school: Central (Pueblo)
- College: Saint Mary's (1934–1937)
- NFL draft: 1938: 12th round, 107th overall pick

Career history
- Green Bay Packers (1943); Brooklyn Tigers (1944); Boston Yanks (1944)

Career NFL statistics
- Rushing yards: 200
- Rushing average: 3.2
- Receptions: 4
- Receiving yards: 60
- Total touchdowns: 1
- Stats at Pro Football Reference

Anthony Joseph Falkenstein (February 16, 1915 – October 10, 1994) was an American professional football fullback in the National Football League (NFL).

== Biography ==
Falkenstein was born on February 16, 1915, in Pueblo, Colorado. He played at the college football at Saint Mary's College of California.

Falkenstein was drafted by the Green Bay Packers in the 12th round of the 1938 NFL draft and played with the Packers during the 1943 NFL season. He split the 1944 NFL season between the Brooklyn Tigers and the Boston Yanks.

Falkenstein played on the 1945 Camp Beale Bears football team.
