= Bob Davis (American football, born 1914) =

American football player (1914–1980)

No. 10, 13, 27
- Positions: Halfback, fullback, quarterback, punter

Personal information
- Born: May 5, 1914; Greenup, Kentucky, U.S.
- Died: March 14, 1980 (aged 65); Mayfield Heights, Ohio, U.S.
- Listed height: 6 ft 1 in (1.85 m)
- Listed weight: 180 lb (82 kg)

Career information
- College: Kentucky
- NFL draft: 1938: undrafted

Career history
- Cleveland Rams (1938); Cincinnati Bengals (1938); Columbus Bullies (1939–1941); Philadelphia Eagles (1942); Boston Yanks (1944–1946)

Awards and highlights
- NFL punt return yards leader (1944)

Career NFL statistics
- Rushing yards: 904
- Rushing touchdowns: 3
- Receptions: 47
- Receiving yards: 427
- Receiving touchdowns: 2
- TD–INT: 4–4
- Passing yards: 217
- Return yards: 1,094
- Stats at Pro Football Reference

James Robert Davis Jr. (May 5, 1914 – March 14, 1980) was an American professional football player who was a halfback, fullback, quarterback and punter in the National Football League (NFL) for the Cleveland Rams, Philadelphia Eagles and the Boston Yanks. He played college football for the Kentucky Wildcats.

On November 22, 1939, Davis, Columbus Bullies teammate Dale Prather, and brothers Wilbur and Morton Braden were arrested for allegedly sexually assaulting a 16-year-old girl. Prather was released from jail the next day after the girl was unable to identify him. The other three men went on trial in January 1940. On February 13, 1940, Wilbur Braden was sentenced to five years probation while Morton Braden and Davis were exonerated.
