= John Morelli (American football) =

American football player (1922–2004)

No. 16
- Positions: Guard, tackle

Personal information
- Born: June 11, 1922; Revere, Massachusetts, U.S.
- Died: January 26, 2004 (aged 80); Greensboro, North Carolina, U.S.
- Listed height: 5 ft 10 in (1.78 m)
- Listed weight: 191 lb (87 kg)

Career information
- High school: Revere
- College: Georgetown (1942)
- NFL draft: 1945: 28th round, 289th overall pick

Career history
- Boston Yanks (1944–1945)

Career NFL statistics
- Games played: 19
- Games started: 3
- Interceptions: 1
- Stats at Pro Football Reference

John Morelli (June 11, 1923 – January 26, 2004) was an American professional football player who played professionally for the Boston Yanks. He played two seasons for the club, playing in 19 games in total.
