= Buzz Warren =

American football player (1916–1986)

Buss Warren
No. 41, 15
- Position: Quarterback

Personal information
- Born: August 13, 1916; Provo, Utah, U.S.
- Died: May 24, 1986 (aged 69); Valencia, California, U.S.
- Listed height: 5 ft 11 in (1.80 m)
- Listed weight: 175 lb (79 kg)

Career information
- College: Tennessee

Career history
- 1945: Philadelphia Eagles
- 1945: Pittsburgh Steelers
- Stats at Pro Football Reference

Buist Lamb "Buss" Warren (1916–1986) was an American football player who played one season in the National Football League (NFL) in 1945. He coached high school football many years.

== Playing career ==
Warren attended the University of Tennessee, leading the Vols to the 1941 Sugar Bowl.

In 1945, he played for the Philadelphia Eagles and the Pittsburgh Steelers in his only season in the NFL. During World War II he served in the Navy as a chef, and in college he played in the Orange Bowl in 1939.
