= Keith Ranspot =

American football player (1913–1977)

No. 6, 84, 27, 14
- Position: End

Personal information
- Born: December 11, 1913; Weatherford, Texas, U.S.
- Died: October 1, 1991 (aged 77); Dallas County, Texas, U.S.
- Listed height: 6 ft 3 in (1.91 m)
- Listed weight: 205 lb (93 kg)

Career information
- College: SMU

Career history
- Chicago Cardinals (1940); Green Bay Packers (1942); Detroit Lions (1942); Brooklyn Dodgers (1943); Boston Yanks (1944–1945)
- Stats at Pro Football Reference

Edgar Keith Ranspot (December 11, 1913 – October 1, 1991) was an American professional football player. He played professionally as an end for five seasons in the National Football League (NFL) for the Chicago Cardinals, Green Bay Packers, Detroit Lions, Brooklyn Dodgers, and Boston Yanks. Ranspot played college football at Southern Methodist University (SMU).
