= Justin Jefferson =

American football player (born 1999)

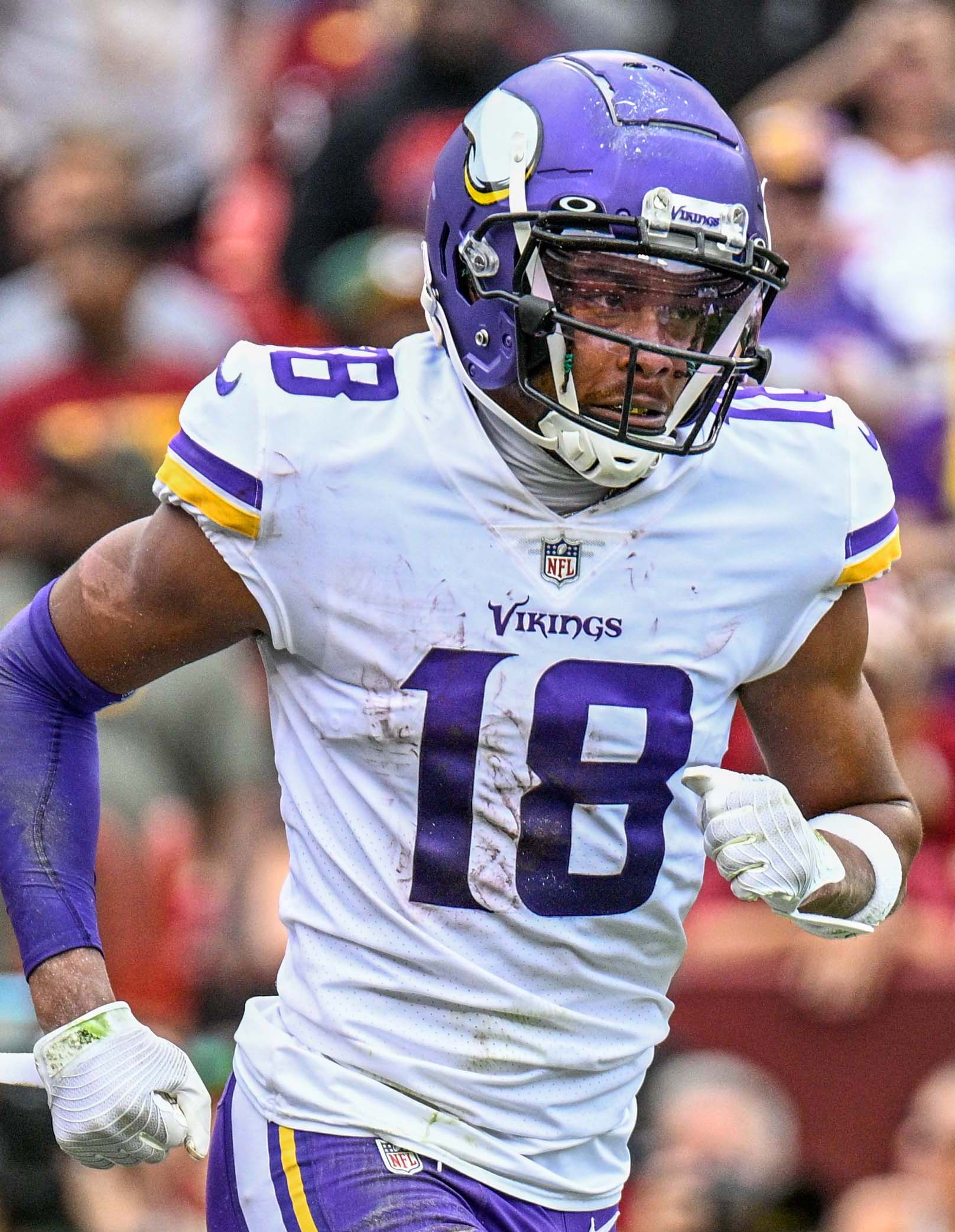
- Jefferson with the Minnesota Vikings in 2022

No. 18 – Minnesota Vikings
- Position: Wide receiver
- Roster status: Active

Personal information
- Born: June 16, 1999 (age 27); St. Rose, Louisiana, U.S.
- Listed height: 6 ft 1 in (1.85 m)
- Listed weight: 195 lb (88 kg)

Career information
- High school: Destrehan (Destrehan, Louisiana)
- College: LSU (2017–2019)
- NFL draft: 2020: 1st round, 22nd overall pick

Career history
- Minnesota Vikings (2020–present)

Awards and highlights
- NFL Offensive Player of the Year (2022); 2× First-team All-Pro (2022, 2024); 2× Second-team All-Pro (2020, 2021); 4× Pro Bowl (2020–2022, 2024); NFL receptions leader (2022); NFL receiving yards leader (2022); PFWA NFL All-Rookie Team (2020); CFP national champion (2019); NCAA receptions co-leader (2019); Second-team All-SEC (2019)

Career NFL statistics as of Week 10, 2026
- Receptions: 619
- Receiving yards: 8,947
- Receiving touchdowns: 46
- Stats at Pro Football Reference

Justin Jamal Jefferson (born June 16, 1999) is an American professional football wide receiver for the Minnesota Vikings of the National Football League (NFL). He played college football for the LSU Tigers, where he won the 2020 College Football Playoff National Championship as a junior before being drafted by the Vikings in the first round of the 2020 NFL draft.

Jefferson has been named to the Pro Bowl and the All-Pro team in four of his first five seasons and has amassed the most receiving yards through a player's first five seasons in NFL history. In 2022, at 23 years old, he became the youngest player to lead the league in receptions (128) and receiving yards (1,809), earning Offensive Player of the Year honors.

== Early life ==
Justin Jamal Jefferson was born on June 16, 1999, to John and Elaine Jefferson. He attended Destrehan High School in Destrehan, Louisiana. A low three-star prospect, ranked by 247Sports as the nation's 308th best wide receiver coming out of high school, he committed to Louisiana State University (LSU) to play college football.

== College career ==
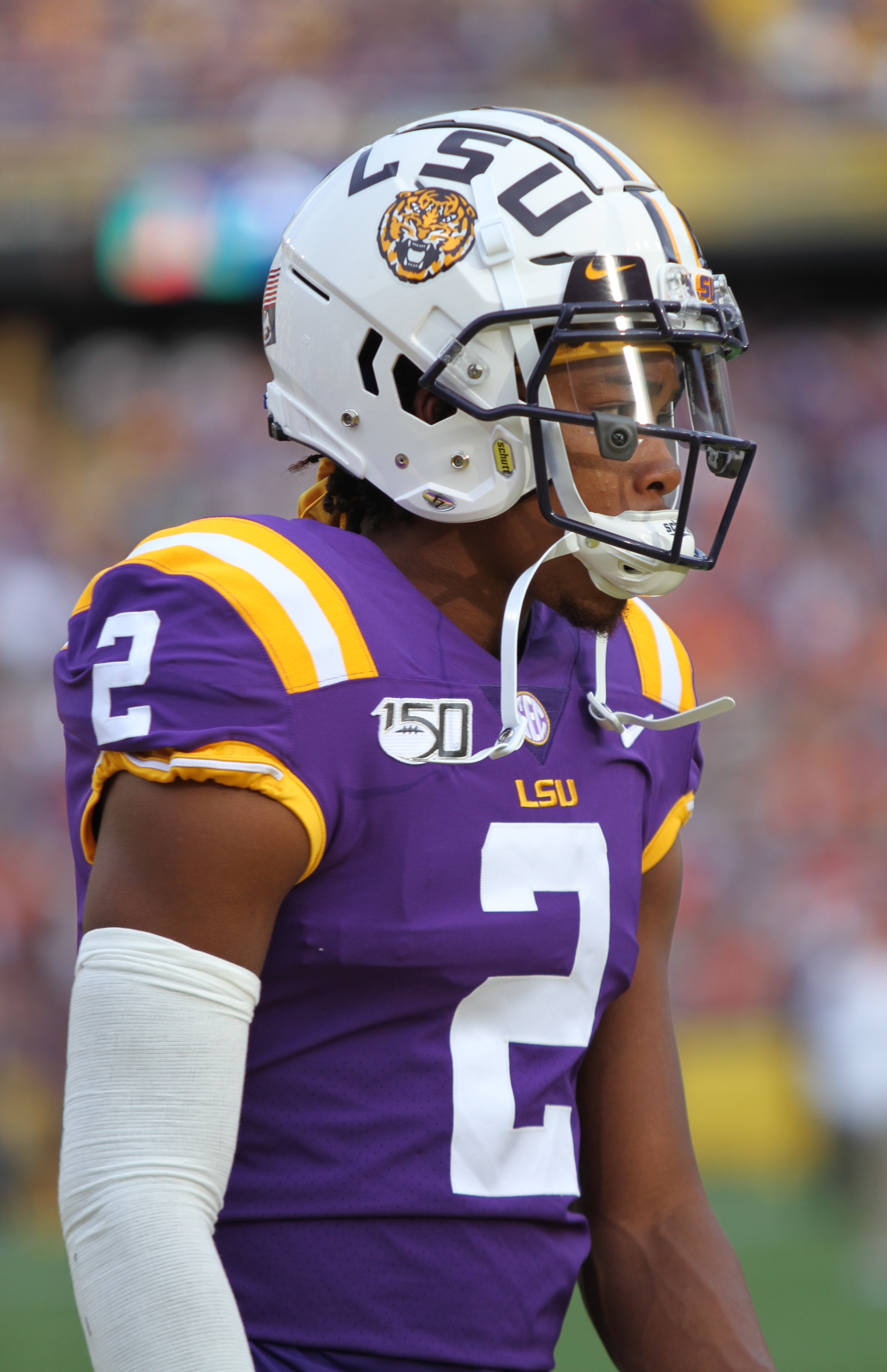
Jefferson with LSU in 2019

Jefferson played at LSU for three years under head coach Ed Orgeron.

=== 2017–2018 ===
After appearing in two games and not recording a catch in his first year at LSU in 2017, Jefferson was their leading receiver in 2018 with 54 catches for 875 yards and six touchdowns. He scored his first collegiate touchdown on a 65-yard reception from Joe Burrow against Ole Miss on September 29, 2018. He had two games going over the 100-yard mark with 108 in a victory over Georgia and 117 in a victory over Arkansas.

=== 2019 ===
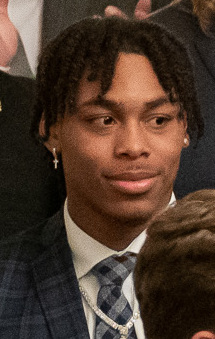
Jefferson at the White House, 2020

In the Tigers' second game of the 2019 season, Jefferson had nine receptions for 163 yards and three touchdowns in a 45–38 victory on the road against Texas. On October 12, against Florida, he had ten receptions for 123 yards and a touchdown in the 42–28 victory. In the SEC Championship, against Georgia, he had seven receptions for 115 yards and a touchdown in the 37–10 victory. Jefferson and the Tigers qualified for the College Football Playoffs with an undefeated record in the 2019 season. He had a historic performance in the Peach Bowl, catching 14 passes for 227 yards and four touchdowns against the Oklahoma Sooners in the College Football Playoff Semifinals at the Peach Bowl. All four touchdowns came in the first half, setting a College Football Playoff game record and tying the record for any bowl game. In the National Championship against Clemson, he had nine receptions for 106 yards in the 42–25 victory. In his junior season, Jefferson co-led the country with 111 receptions. His 18 receiving touchdowns ranked second in the country—behind only teammate Ja'Marr Chase—and his 1,540 receiving yards were ranked third. He had eight games going over the 100-yard mark. He was named one of 12 semi finalists for the Biletnikoff Award. On January 15, 2020, Jefferson announced that he would forgo his senior season and enter the NFL draft.

== Professional career ==
Pre-draft measurables
Height	Weight	Arm length	Hand span	Wingspan	40-yard dash	10-yard split	20-yard split	Vertical jump	Broad jump	Wonderlic
6 ft 1 1/4 in (1.86 m)	202 lb (92 kg)	33 in (0.84 m)	9 1/8 in (0.23 m)	6 ft 6 in (1.98 m)	4.43 s	1.54 s	2.61 s	37.5 in (0.95 m)	10 ft 6 in (3.20 m)	19
All values from NFL Combine

=== 2020 ===
Jefferson was selected by the Minnesota Vikings in the first round with the 22nd overall pick in the 2020 NFL draft. The Vikings previously obtained the 22nd selection as part of a blockbuster trade that sent wide receiver Stefon Diggs to the Buffalo Bills, a trade that has been considered by many around the league as one of the “top win-win deals ever.” Jefferson signed a four-year, $13.12 million contract with the team, with a $7.1 million signing bonus. Jefferson was placed on the reserve/COVID-19 list by the team on July 27, 2020, before being cleared and activated a week later. Jefferson made his debut in Week 1 against the Green Bay Packers, recording two receptions for 26 yards. He made his first start of the season in a Week 3 game against the Tennessee Titans, where he had his first big breakthrough by finishing with 175 receiving yards and a touchdown on seven receptions, but the Vikings lost 31–30. He followed up that performance the next week with four receptions for 103 yards in a 31–23 win over the Houston Texans. In doing so, he became just the fifth rookie wide receiver in Vikings history to have back-to-back games with at least 100 yards receiving. During Week 6 against the Atlanta Falcons, Jefferson finished with nine receptions for 166 receiving yards and two touchdowns.

In Week 13 against the Jacksonville Jaguars, Jefferson recorded nine catches for 121 yards and a touchdown during a 27–24 overtime win, in this game he broke the 1,000 receiving yard mark. In Week 15 against the Chicago Bears, Jefferson broke Randy Moss' Vikings rookie receiving record by catching eight passes, putting him at 74 receptions, surpassing the 69 catches Moss had in 1998.

By the season's end, Jefferson had set the NFL record for most receiving yards (1,400) by a rookie in NFL history after surpassing Anquan Boldin's 1,377 yards in 2003 (although his record would be broken by his former LSU teammate Ja'Marr Chase the following season). He was one of only two rookies named to the 2021 Pro Bowl, alongside defensive end Chase Young of the Washington Football Team. He was named Rookie of the Year by the Sporting News. He was named to the NFL All-Rookie Team. He was ranked 53rd by his fellow players on the NFL Top 100 Players of 2021.

=== 2021 ===
Jefferson's season started strong, putting up over 100 receiving yards against the Seattle Seahawks, Detroit Lions, and Los Angeles Chargers over the first eight games of the season. In Week 11, Jefferson had eight catches for 169 yards and two touchdowns in a 34–31 win over the Packers, earning NFC Offensive Player of the Week. In Week 13, Jefferson caught 11 passes for 182 yards and a touchdown in a 29–27 loss to the Lions. Jefferson's 464 yards and three touchdowns through four games in the month of November earned him NFC Offensive Player of the Month, the first of his career. During Week 16, Jefferson passed Odell Beckham Jr. for most receiving yards by a player in his first two NFL seasons. Jefferson finished the season with 1,616 receiving yards, good for second-most in the NFL in 2021, and just 16 yards short of Randy Moss's single-season franchise record. Jefferson was named to the 2022 Pro Bowl, joining Randy Moss and Sammy White as the only three Vikings wide receivers to make Pro Bowls in each of their first two professional seasons. For the second consecutive year, Jefferson was named a second-team member of the AP All-Pro team, missing a spot on the first-team by a single vote. He was ranked 17th by his fellow players on the NFL Top 100 Players of 2022.

=== 2022 ===
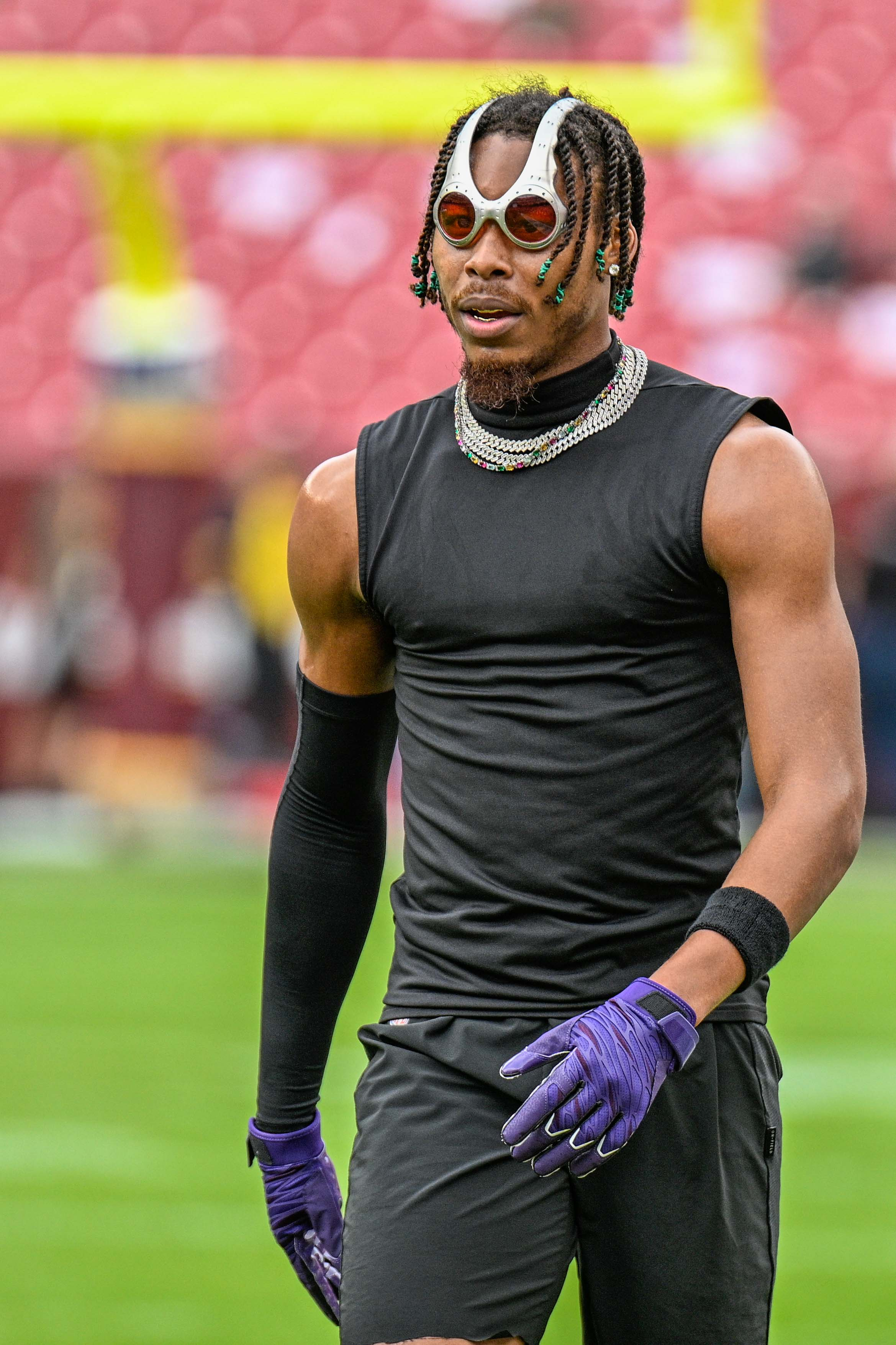
Jefferson during pre-game warm-ups in 2022

Against the Packers in Week 1, Jefferson caught nine passes for 184 yards and two touchdowns in the 23–7 win. During Week 4 against the New Orleans Saints at Tottenham Hotspur Stadium, Jefferson finished with 147 receiving yards and a rushing touchdown as the Vikings won 28–25. The following week against Bears, Jefferson caught a career-high 12 catches resulting in 154 yards receiving in the 29–22 win. Jefferson's third catch of the game marked 227 career receptions, surpassing Randy Moss for the franchise record of the most receptions in the first three years of a career.

Against the Buffalo Bills in Week 10, Jefferson caught 10 passes for a career-high 193 yards and a touchdown as the Vikings went on to win 33–30 in overtime. One of Jefferson's catches came with two minutes left in the fourth quarter where on 4th down and 18, Jefferson made a one-handed catch for 32 yards, wrestling the ball away from Bills cornerback Cam Lewis on the way to the ground. The catch was widely heralded as one of the greatest of all time, and the play was named the NFL Play of the Year award at the end of the season. His arm sleeves and gloves from the game were also put on display in the Pro Football Hall of Fame. He earned NFC Offensive Player of the Week for his game against the Bills. In Week 12, against the New England Patriots, he had nine receptions for 139 receiving yards and one receiving touchdown in the 33–26 victory. In the game against the Patriots, Jefferson passed Moss for the most receiving yards in a player's first three seasons. He won NFC Offensive Player of the Month for November. In Week 14 against the Lions, Jefferson recorded 11 receptions for 223 yards, setting the Vikings single-game record for receiving yards, in the 34–23 road loss. Additionally, in week 15 against the Indianapolis Colts, Jefferson recorded 12 receptions for 123 yards and a touchdown, setting his season total to 1,623 yards, a new career high. Against the Packers in Week 17, he was held to one catch on five targets for 15 yards, the lowest stats in a game of his career. During the same game, Jefferson appeared to inadvertently hit a referee with his helmet out of clear frustration, and received no punishment for the incident. He earned first-team All-Pro honors and a third Pro Bowl nomination for his career.

Jefferson finished the 2022 regular season with a league-leading 128 receptions for 1,809 yards and nine total touchdowns (eight receiving, one rushing). He won the Offensive Player of the Year award and The Sporting News Offensive Player of the Year award, as well as being a final candidate for the league MVP award. He was ranked second by his fellow players on the NFL Top 100 Players of 2023.

=== 2023 ===
On April 25, 2023, the Vikings picked up the fifth-year option of Jefferson's rookie contract. Jefferson started the 2023 regular season with nine receptions for 150 yards in a 20–17 loss to the Tampa Bay Buccaneers in Week 1. Four days later, he had 11 receptions for 159 in a 34–28 loss to the Philadelphia Eagles in Week 2. In Week 3, against the Los Angeles Chargers, he had seven receptions for 149 yards and a touchdown in the 28–24 loss. In Week 4, he had two receiving touchdowns against the Carolina Panthers in the 21–13 victory. On October 11, 2023, the Vikings placed Jefferson on injured reserve, due to a hamstring injury suffered in Week 5 against the Kansas City Chiefs. The Vikings activated Jefferson off of injured reserve on November 28, 2023. In his return against the Las Vegas Raiders in Week 14, Jefferson caught two passes for 27 yards before leaving with a chest injury in the second quarter.

Despite missing seven games due to injury, Jefferson still managed to finish the 2023 season with over 1,000 receiving yards. During the season, he set an NFL record for most receiving yards through a player's first four seasons. He was ranked 18th by his fellow players on the NFL Top 100 Players of 2024.

=== 2024 ===
On June 3, 2024, Jefferson signed a four-year, $140 million contract extension that includes $110 million guaranteed, keeping him under contract with the Vikings through the 2028 season. The deal made Jefferson the highest-paid non-quarterback in the NFL at an average of $35 million per year.

In Week 2, Jefferson caught a 97-yard touchdown pass and achieved 400 career receptions in a 23–17 win over the San Francisco 49ers. He also tied Lance Alworth for the fastest player in NFL history to achieve 6,000 career receiving yards, doing so in 62 games. In Week 11 against the Tennessee Titans, Jefferson passed Torry Holt for the most receiving yards in a player's first five NFL seasons. Jefferson eclipsed 1,000 receiving yards in Week 13 against the Arizona Cardinals, becoming the fourth receiver in NFL history to record 1,000 yards in each of his first five seasons. After a career-long six game touchdown drought, Jefferson had his first multi-touchdown performance of the season in Week 14 against the Atlanta Falcons, finishing with 132 yards and two scores in a 42–21 victory. In Week 16, he had ten receptions for 144 yards and two touchdowns in a 27–24 win over the Seattle Seahawks. He was named first team All-Pro for the second time. He earned Pro Bowl honors for the fourth time. He finished the 2024 season with 103 receptions for 1,533 yards and ten touchdowns. He was ranked ninth by his fellow players on the NFL Top 100 Players of 2025.

=== 2025 ===
In Week 4 against the Steelers, Jefferson had ten receptions for 126 yards in the 24–21 loss. In the 2025 season, Jefferson had 84 receptions for 1,048 receiving yards but a career-low two touchdowns. He joined Randy Moss and Mike Evans as the only players in NFL history to record six consecutive 1,000 yard seasons to start a career.

=== 2026 ===
In a week 2 victory against the Bears, Jefferson caught his 558th pass to move past Randy Moss for the second most receptions in Vikings history. Cris Carter holds the team record with 1004. In week 10 against the Green Bay Packers, Jefferson caught nine passes for 74 yards in the 30–10 win.

== Career statistics ==
Legend
	AP NFL Offensive Player of the Year
	NFL record
	Led the league
**Bold**	Career best

=== NFL ===
==== Regular season ====
Year	Team	Games		Receiving								Rushing					Passing							Fumbles	
Year	Team	GP	GS	Tgt	Rec	Yds	Avg	Y/G	Lng	TD	FD	Att	Yds	Avg	Lng	TD	Cmp	Att	Pct	Yds	TD	Int	Rtg	Fum	Lost
2020	MIN	16	14	125	88	1,400	**15.9**	87.5	71	7	58	1	2	2.0	2	0	—	—	—	—	—	—	—	1	**0**
2021	MIN	17	17	167	108	1,616	15.0	95.1	56	**10**	75	**6**	14	2.3	**11**	0	**2**	**4**	50.0	**35**	0	0	80.2	1	1
2022	MIN	17	17	**184**	**128**	**1,809**	14.1	106.4	64	8	**80**	4	**24**	**6.0**	10	**1**	**2**	2	**100.0**	34	0	0	**118.7**	**0**	**0**
2023	MIN	10	9	100	68	1,074	15.8	**107.4**	52	5	51	1	−12	−12.0	−12	0	0	1	0.0	0	0	0	39.6	1	1
2024	MIN	17	17	154	103	1,533	14.9	90.2	**97**	**10**	62	1	3	3.0	3	0	1	1	**100.0**	22	0	0	**118.7**	1	**0**
2025	MIN	17	17	141	84	1,048	12.5	61.6	50	2	47	2	7	3.5	4	0	—	—	—	—	—	—	—	**0**	**0**
2026	MIN	8	8	64	40	467	11.7	58.4	39	4	25	1	-11	-11.0	-11	0	—	—	—	—	—	—	—	**1**	**0**
Career		102	99	935	619	8,947	14.5	87.7	97	46	403	16	27	1.7	11	1	5	8	62.5	91	0	0	101.6	5	2

==== Postseason ====
Year	Team	Games		Receiving							Passing							Fumbles	
Year	Team	GP	GS	Tgt	Rec	Yds	Avg	Lng	TD	FD	Cmp	Att	Pct	Yds	TD	Int	Rtg	Fum	Lost
2022	MIN	1	1	**9**	**7**	47	6.7	10	0	**3**	**1**	**1**	**100.0**	**-2**	0	0	**79.2**	0	0
2024	MIN	1	1	8	5	**58**	**11.6**	**22**	0	2	—	—	—	—	—	—	—	0	0
Career		2	2	17	12	105	8.8	22	0	5	1	1	100.0	-2	0	0	79.2	0	0

=== College ===
Legend
Co-led the NCAA

Season	Team	GP	Receiving				Rushing			
Season	Team	GP	Rec	Yds	Avg	TD	Att	Yds	Avg	TD
2017	LSU	6	0	0	0.0	0	1	4	4.0	0
2018	LSU	13	54	875	**16.2**	6	**5**	**26**	**5.2**	0
2019	LSU	15	**111**	**1,540**	13.9	**18**	0	0	—	0
Career		34	165	2,415	14.6	24	6	30	5.0	0

== Career highlights ==
=== Awards and Honors ===
==== NFL ====
- NFL Offensive Player of the Year (2022)
- PFWA NFL Offensive Player of the Year (2022)
- The Sporting News Offensive Player of the Year (2022)
- NFL Moment of the Year (2022)
- 2× First-team All-Pro (2022, 2024)
- 2× Second-Team All-Pro (2020, 2021)
- 4× Pro Bowl (2020—2022, 2024)
- NFL receptions leader (2022)
- NFL receiving yards leader (2022)
- PFWA NFL All-Rookie Team (2020)
- 6× NFL Top 100 — 53rd (2021), 17th (2022), 2nd (2023), 18th (2024), 9th (2025), 19th (2026)
- 2× NFC Offensive Player of the Month (November 2021, November 2022)
- 2× NFC Offensive Player of the Week (Week 11, 2021; Week 10, 2022)

==== College ====
- CFP national champion (2019)
- NCAA receptions co-leader (2019)
- Second-team All-SEC (2019)

=== Records ===
==== NFL records ====
- Tied with Michael Thomas and Amon Ra St. Brown for most receptions in first two seasons: 196
- Most receptions in first three seasons: 324
- Most receptions in first six seasons: 579
- Most receiving yards in first two seasons: 3,016
- Most receiving yards in first three seasons: 4,825
- Most receiving yards in first four seasons: 5,899
- Most receiving yards in first five seasons: 7,432
- Most receiving yards in first six seasons: 8,480
- Most games with 100+ receiving yards in first three seasons: 24
- Most games with 100+ receiving yards in first four seasons: 29
- Most games with 100+ receiving yards in first five seasons: 34
- Tied with Lance Alworth, Odell Beckham Jr., and Puka Nacua for fastest player to reach 4,000 career receiving yards: 42 games
- Tied with Lance Alworth for fastest player to reach 5,000 career receiving yards: 52 games
- Tied with Lance Alworth for fastest player to reach 6,000 career receiving yards: 62 games

==== Vikings franchise records ====
- Receiving yards in a season: 1,809
- Receptions in a season: 128
- Receiving yards in a game: 223
- Receiving yards in a season by a rookie: 1,400
- Receptions in a season by a rookie: 88

== Personal life ==
His brothers, Jordan and Rickey, also played college football at LSU. Their father, John, played Division II college basketball. On April 27, 2021, Jefferson was the first NFL player to have a reference in Fortnite with the dance, the Griddy.
