= PFWA NFL Offensive Player of the Year Award =

American football offensive player award

The Pro Football Writers of America has annually honored an offensive player of the year in the National Football League since 1992. From 1992 through 2012, the award was presented in conjunction with Pro Football Weekly.

Season	Player	Team	Position	Ref
1992	Steve Young	San Francisco 49ers	Quarterback	
1993	Emmitt Smith	Dallas Cowboys	Running back	
1994	Steve Young	San Francisco 49ers	Quarterback	
1995	Brett Favre	Green Bay Packers	Quarterback	
1996	Brett Favre	Green Bay Packers	Quarterback	
1997	Barry Sanders	Detroit Lions	Running back	
1998	Barry Sanders	Detroit Lions	Running back	
1999	Kurt Warner	St. Louis Rams	Quarterback	
2000	Marshall Faulk	St. Louis Rams	Running back	
2001	Marshall Faulk	St. Louis Rams	Running back	
2002	Rich Gannon	Oakland Raiders	Quarterback	
2003	Jamal Lewis	Baltimore Ravens	Running back	
2004	Peyton Manning	Indianapolis Colts	Quarterback	
2005	Shaun Alexander	Seattle Seahawks	Running back	
2006	LaDainian Tomlinson	San Diego Chargers	Running back	
2007	Tom Brady	New England Patriots	Quarterback	
2008	Peyton Manning	Indianapolis Colts	Quarterback	
2009	Peyton Manning	Indianapolis Colts	Quarterback	
2010	Tom Brady	New England Patriots	Quarterback	
2011	Aaron Rodgers	Green Bay Packers	Quarterback	
2012	Adrian Peterson	Minnesota Vikings	Running back	
2013	Peyton Manning	Denver Broncos	Quarterback	
2014	DeMarco Murray	Dallas Cowboys	Running back	
2015	Cam Newton	Carolina Panthers	Quarterback	
2016	Matt Ryan	Atlanta Falcons	Quarterback	
2017	Todd Gurley	Los Angeles Rams	Running back	
2018	Patrick Mahomes	Kansas City Chiefs	Quarterback	
2019	Lamar Jackson	Baltimore Ravens	Quarterback	
2020	Derrick Henry	Tennessee Titans	Running back	
2021	Cooper Kupp	Los Angeles Rams	Wide receiver	
2022	Justin Jefferson	Minnesota Vikings	Wide receiver	
2023	Christian McCaffrey	San Francisco 49ers	Running back	
2024	Saquon Barkley	Philadelphia Eagles	Running back	
2025	Jaxon Smith-Njigba	Seattle Seahawks	Wide receiver	

== See also ==
- National Football League Offensive Player of the Year Award, overview of all NFL Offensive Player of the Year awards
- Pro Football Writers of America NFL Defensive Player of the Year Award
