= Smash and Dash =

Smash and Dash may refer to:

- Smash and Dash, the former nickname for the duo of Tennessee Titans running backs LenDale White and Chris Johnson
- Smash and Dash, the former nickname for the duo of Carolina Panthers running backs DeAngelo Williams and Jonathan Stewart, later known as "Double Trouble"
