= Rondel Menendez =

American football player (born 1975)

Profile
- Position: Wide receiver

Personal information
- Born: May 18, 1975 (age 51); Louisville, Kentucky, U.S.
- Listed height: 5 ft 9 in (1.75 m)
- Listed weight: 183 lb (83 kg)

Career information
- College: Eastern Kentucky
- NFL draft: 1999: 7th round, 247th overall pick

Career history
- Atlanta Falcons (1999)*; Miami Dolphins (1999); Indianapolis Colts (1999); Washington Redskins (1999); Philadelphia Eagles (2000)*; Frankfurt Galaxy (2001)
- * Offseason or practice squad member only

Rondel Menendez (born May 18, 1975) is an American former professional football wide receiver. He was selected by the Atlanta Falcons in the seventh-round of the 1999 NFL draft out of Eastern Kentucky University. He shared the record for the fastest 40-yard dash time with Chris Johnson, recorded at the NFL Combine at 4.24 seconds. In 2017, his record was broken by John Ross, who ran a 4.22 second 40-yard dash.

== College career ==
After accumulating 821 yards receiving in his first two years with Eastern Kentucky, Menendez accomplished a breakout season in his junior year, totaling 1,137 yards on 54 receptions. During this season, Menendez gained 280 yards receiving in a game against Eastern Illinois, the second highest single game receiving yards total in school history. For his senior season, Menendez earned a second consecutive 1,000+ yard season, totaling 1,032 yards receiving in addition to 11 receiving touchdowns.

== Professional career ==
Pre-draft measurables
Height	Weight	40-yard dash	10-yard split	20-yard split	20-yard shuttle	Vertical jump
5 ft 9 3/8 in (1.76 m)	178 lb (81 kg)	4.24 s	1.47 s	2.53 s	3.96 s	37.0 in (0.94 m)
All values from NFL Combine

Menendez was selected in the seventh round (247th overall) by the Atlanta Falcons. He impressed early on in his career, scoring a touchdown on a 63-yard punt return in a preseason game against the Detroit Lions.

Menendez sustained a torn meniscus on a punt return in Atlanta's final game of the 1999 preseason after he requested playing time during the contest. After his release that year, Menendez spent time on the rosters of the Miami Dolphins, Indianapolis Colts and the Washington Redskins, who traded him to the Philadelphia Eagles the following offseason.

Following the Eagles acquisition, Menendez temporarily retired to care for his mother who had recently suffered a stroke. After his mother recovered, Menendez rejoined the Eagles where he was assigned for NFL Europe duty with the Frankfurt Galaxy. Subsequently, Menendez retired from professional football for the final time.
