= Marshall Faulk =

American football former player (born 1973)

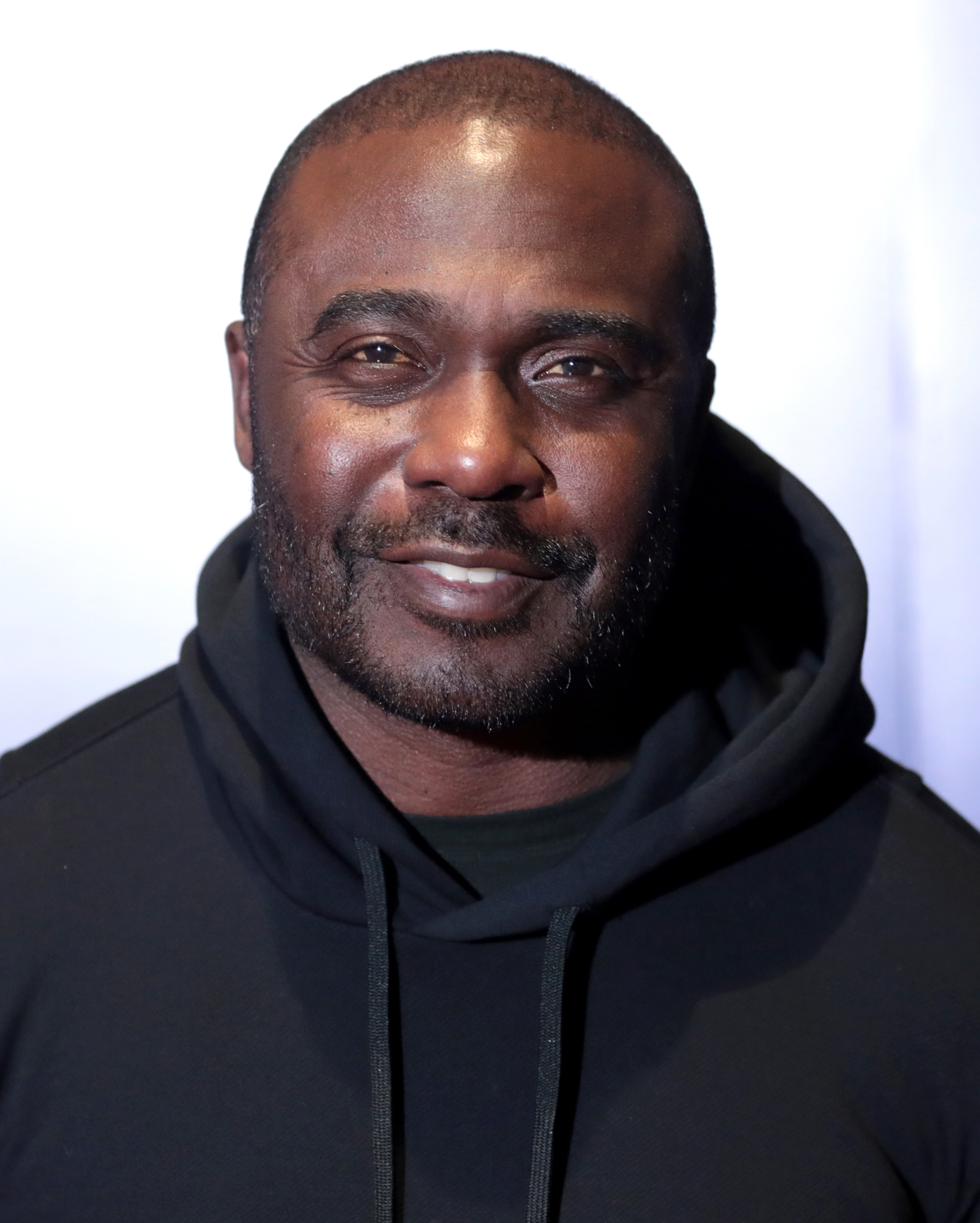
- Faulk in 2023

Southern Jaguars
- Title: Head coach

Personal information
- Born: February 26, 1973 (age 53); New Orleans, Louisiana, U.S.
- Listed height: 5 ft 10 in (1.78 m)
- Listed weight: 211 lb (96 kg)

Career information
- Position: Running back (No. 28)
- High school: G. W. Carver (New Orleans)
- College: San Diego State (1991–1993)
- NFL draft: 1994: 1st round, 2nd overall pick

Career history

Playing
- Indianapolis Colts (1994–1998); St. Louis Rams (1999–2005)

Coaching
- Colorado (2025) Running backs coach; Southern (2026–present) Head coach

Awards and highlights
- Super Bowl champion (XXXIV); NFL Most Valuable Player (2000); 3× NFL Offensive Player of the Year (1999–2001); NFL Offensive Rookie of the Year (1994); 3× First-team All-Pro (1999–2001); 3× Second-team All-Pro (1994, 1995, 1998); 7× Pro Bowl (1994, 1995, 1998–2002); NFL rushing touchdowns leader (2000); 2× NFL scoring leader (2000, 2001); Bert Bell Award (2001); PFWA All-Rookie Team (1994); SN Athlete of the Year (2000) (Note: Shared with Kurt Warner.); St. Louis Football Ring of Fame; Indianapolis Colts Ring of Honor; Los Angeles Rams No. 28 retired; Jim Brown Trophy (1992); 2× Unanimous All-American (1992, 1993); First-team All-American (1991); NCAA rushing touchdowns leader (1991); NCAA rushing yards leader (1992); 2× NCAA scoring leader (1991, 1993); WAC Offensive Player of the Year (1992); WAC Freshman of the Year (1991); 3× First-team All-WAC (1991-1993); San Diego State Aztecs No. 28 retired; NFL record: Career 2-point conversions scored: 7 (tied with Alvin Kamara, Zach Ertz, and Saquon Barkley)

Career NFL statistics
- Rushing yards: 12,279
- Rushing average: 4.3
- Rushing touchdowns: 100
- Receptions: 767
- Receiving yards: 6,875
- Receiving touchdowns: 36
- Stats at Pro Football Reference
- Pro Football Hall of Fame
- College Football Hall of Fame

Marshall William Faulk (born February 26, 1973) is an American football coach and former professional running back who is the head coach for the Southern Jaguars. Faulk previously played in the National Football League (NFL) for 12 seasons, most notably with the St. Louis Rams. He is regarded as one of the greatest running backs of all time.

Faulk played college football for the San Diego State Aztecs, twice receiving unanimous All-American honors. He was selected second overall in the 1994 NFL draft by the Indianapolis Colts, where he spent his first five seasons and earned two Pro Bowl selections. Faulk spent his next seven seasons with the Rams, becoming a central contributor to the Greatest Show on Turf offense. As a member of the Rams, Faulk was named NFL Most Valuable Player in 2000, won a record three AP NFL Offensive Player of the Year awards, extended his Pro Bowl selections to seven, and received three consecutive first-team All-Pro selections. He also appeared in two Super Bowls, winning Super Bowl XXXIV. Following his playing career, Faulk was an analyst for various programs on NFL Network until December 2017.

Faulk is one of only three NFL players (along with Marcus Allen and Tiki Barber) to reach at least 10,000 rushing yards and 5,000 receiving yards and the only to amass 12,000 yards rushing and 6,000 yards receiving. He was inducted to the Pro Football Hall of Fame in 2011 and the College Football Hall of Fame in 2017.

== Early life ==
Faulk was born and raised in New Orleans, Louisiana. He attended Carver High School in the Ninth Ward of New Orleans, where he played for the Carver Rams high school football team. Also a standout track sprinter, Faulk was timed at 10.3 seconds in the 100 meters, 21.74 over 200 meters, and 49.4 in the 400 meters. While growing up he sold popcorn at New Orleans Saints games in the Louisiana Superdome.

During his final two years playing for Carver High, Faulk rushed 1,800 yards and scored thirty-two touchdowns. In his senior season, he also played defensive back, intercepting 11 passes and returning six of them for touchdowns.

== College career ==
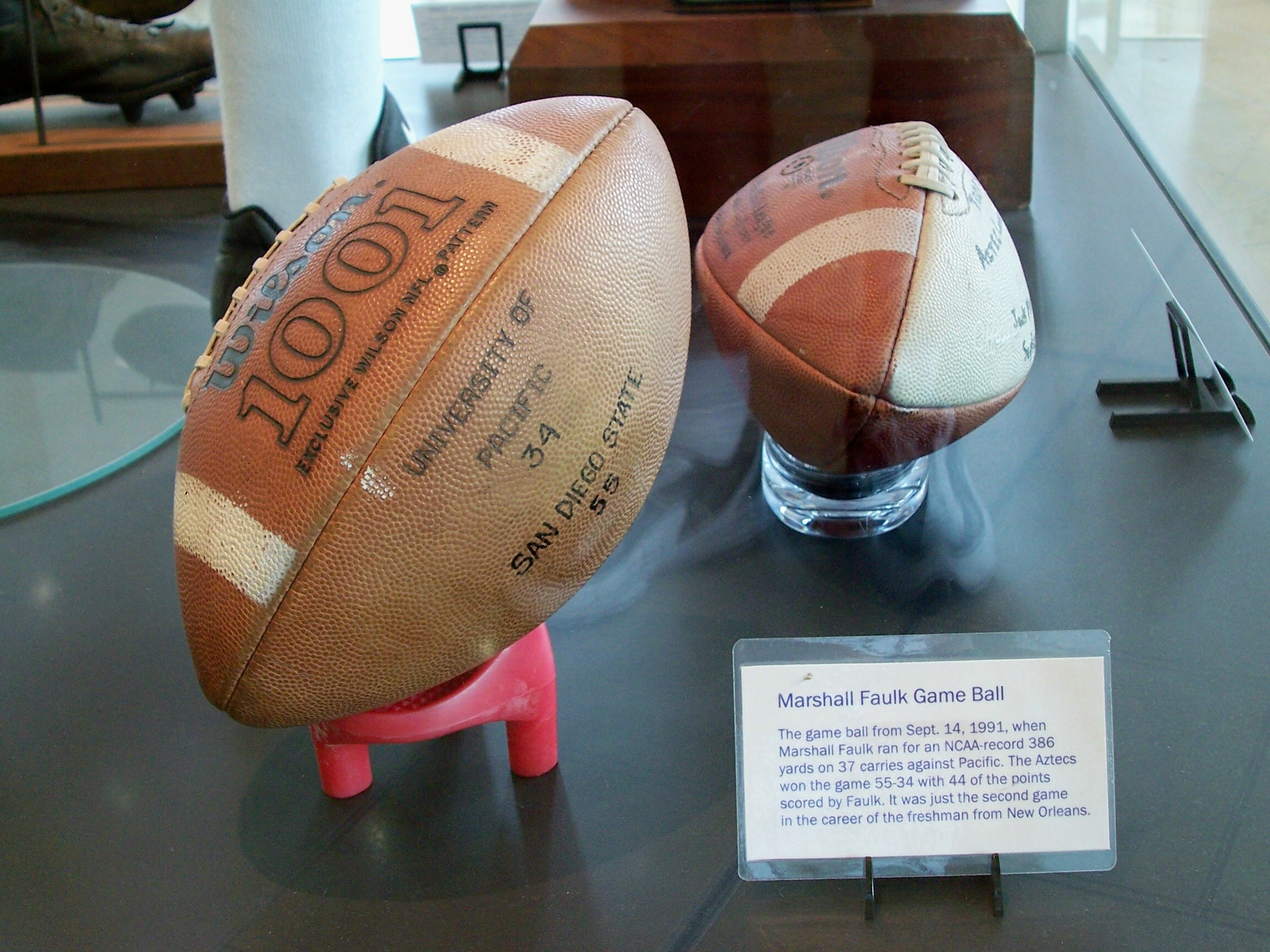
Marshall Faulk's game ball from the September 14, 1991, game when he ran for an NCAA-record 386 yards and scored 44 points in his second game as a true freshman for San Diego State

Faulk was heavily recruited by several major colleges, but due to his standout performance on defense, most of them recruited him to play the cornerback position. However, Faulk strongly desired to play the running back position in college. "I didn't love playing cornerback, so I knew I wouldn't be as successful in that position," Faulk told Sports Illustrated Kids. "You have to really love what you do to be a star." Ultimately he accepted an athletic scholarship to attend San Diego State University, because they were the first team to offer him a scholarship to play running back.

One of the best performances of his career was against the University of the Pacific on September 14, 1991, in just his second collegiate game. In 37 carries, he amassed 386 yards and scored seven touchdowns, both records for freshmen (the 386 yards were a then-NCAA record). "Faulk had scoring runs of 61, 7, 47, 9, 5, 8 and 25 yards." That performance sparked one of the greatest freshman seasons in NCAA history, gaining 1,429 yards rushing, with 1,630 total yards from scrimmage, 23 total touchdowns (21 rushing), and 140 points scored. At the end of the year, Faulk joined Tony Dorsett and Herschel Walker as one of just three true freshmen ever selected to the College Football All-America Team by the Associated Press.

Faulk went on to better 1,600 yards rushing in his sophomore year. In Faulk's junior season in 1993, he was able to showcase his all-purpose ability by catching 47 passes for 640 yards and 3 touchdowns to go with 1,530 yards and 21 touchdowns on the ground. These numbers put Faulk 3rd in the nation in all-purpose yardage that year, and 2nd in scoring. Faulk left San Diego State University with many of the school's offensive records, among them 5,562 all-purpose yards and 62 career touchdowns, which is the 8th most in NCAA history.

After his 1992 season at SDSU, Faulk finished second in the Heisman Trophy award voting, losing to quarterback Gino Torretta in what was considered a notable snub in the history of the award. Torretta's 1992 Miami Hurricanes football team was undefeated in the regular season and ranked No. 1 in the country before the Heisman balloting, Faulk's team finished with a middling 5–5–1 record, continuing a trend of the Heisman going to the most notable player on one of the nation's best teams. ESPN analyst Lee Corso led a campaign supporting Torretta for the Heisman and left Marshall Faulk off of his ballot. Faulk was a Heisman finalist as well in 1991 (9th) and 1993 (4th).

In 1992, Faulk was named Arthur Ashe Sports Scholar Jr. by Diverse: Issues In Higher Education.

== Professional career ==
=== Pre-draft ===
Pre-draft measurables
Height	Weight	Arm length	Hand span	40-yard dash
5 ft 10 1/8 in (1.78 m)	206 lb (93 kg)	31 3/4 in (0.81 m)	9 1/8 in (0.23 m)	4.35 s
All values from NFL Combine

Along with defensive tackle Dan Wilkinson and quarterbacks Heath Shuler and Trent Dilfer, Faulk was regarded as "one of the four players who rank well above the others in this draft". and on March 31, he ran a 4.35 forty-yard time at the San Diego State Pro Day. The Bengals had the No. 1 pick in the 1994 NFL draft, and contemplated combining their heavy-duty runner Harold Green with the explosive Faulk, but picked Wilkinson, leaving Faulk for the Indianapolis Colts.

=== Indianapolis Colts ===
Faulk was drafted in the first round with the second overall pick in the 1994 NFL draft by the Indianapolis Colts, who were in desperate need of a running game. On July 25, 1994, Faulk signed a seven-year $17.2 million contract and received a $5.1 million signing bonus. Faulk responded by rushing for 1,282 yards, 11 touchdowns, and one receiving touchdown. The Colts improved to 8–8. Marshall Faulk, later that season, would become the first NFL player to win both the Offensive Rookie of the Year Award and the Pro Bowl's Most Valuable Player Award in the same season. He was also the first rookie to win Pro Bowl MVP.

The next season Faulk rushed for 1,078 yards and 14 total touchdowns. The Colts made the postseason, going 9–7, and narrowly missed the Super Bowl after a close loss to the Pittsburgh Steelers in the AFC Championship Game, which Faulk missed due to a nagging toe injury.

The next year was a miserable one for Faulk. Because of a toe injury he suffered earlier in the season, he rushed for only 587 yards, with a 3 yards-per-carry average. He led the Colts in yards from scrimmage with 1,015. He recovered from the injury and rushed for 1,000+ yards in each of the next two seasons, setting a new personal high with 1,319 in 1998. He also caught 86 passes for 906 yards that year (playing alongside rookie quarterback Peyton Manning) and was the NFL's leader in total yards from scrimmage with 2,227, beating out Denver's MVP running back Terrell Davis by 2 yards, while also finishing 4th in the league in receptions. It would also be the first of an NFL-record 4 consecutive 2,000+ total-yard seasons.

=== St. Louis Rams ===
Faulk was traded to the St. Louis Rams the following season for second- and fifth-round picks in the upcoming draft (which the Colts used to draft LB Mike Peterson and DE Brad Scioli). The Colts moved on at the position, drafting Edgerrin James in the first round. Faulk held out for 12 days as the details of his contract were worked out. On August 4, 1999, Faulk signed a seven-year, $45.2 million contract with the Rams, which was the biggest deal in team history at the time. In it, Faulk was guaranteed $9.6 million including a $7-million signing bonus. The problem in negotiations was the proposed fifth year, in which Faulk would get $7 million in salary and a $5-million roster bonus. The deal was structured to prevent Faulk from ever being tagged a transition or franchise player.

In his first year in St. Louis, Faulk was the catalyst for "The Greatest Show on Turf", a nickname given to coordinator Mike Martz's aggressive Coryell-style offense. In this offense, he put up some of the best all-purpose numbers in the history of the NFL. Faulk's patience and diligence in learning the Rams' offense paid off when he totaled an NFL record 2,429 yards from scrimmage, eclipsing Barry Sanders's record of 2,358 yards set in 1997 (Faulk's mark has since been broken by Chris Johnson in 2009). With 1,381 yards rushing (5.5 yards-per-carry average), 1,048 receiving yards, and scoring 12 touchdowns, Faulk joined Roger Craig as the only men at that time to total 1,000+ yards in each category in a season. He also broke the NFL season record for most receiving yards by a running back, previously held by Lionel James. The Rams went on to win Super Bowl XXXIV. In the game, Faulk was contained on the ground by Tennessee Titans head coach Jeff Fisher's defensive scheme, limiting him to just 17 rushing yards. This was perhaps due to the Titans' inability to stop the Rams' passing game, of which Faulk was a major part, recording 5 receptions for 90 yards. His 90 receiving yards were the second-highest total by a running back in Super Bowl history. At the end of the season, he received the NFL Offensive Player of the Year Award and was a starter for the NFC squad in the 1999 Pro Bowl.

The following year, Faulk became the first running back in NFL history to lead his team in receptions five separate seasons (three in Indianapolis and twice in St. Louis). In addition, he was the NFL MVP and again the Offensive Player of the Year in 2000. He had 1,359 yards rushing in 14 games and set a new NFL record with 26 total touchdowns, (a record that would soon be broken by Priest Holmes and then later by Shaun Alexander and LaDainian Tomlinson), despite missing two games due to injury. He also averaged 5+ yards per carry again, this time with 5.4. The Rams, however, were not able to replicate the record they had the year prior. Even with the offense scoring the most points and yards during "The Greatest Show on Turf" era, the defense gave up 470 points.

The Rams returned to the Super Bowl the next year as their defense returned to form, allowing only 273 points, and the offense once again scored over 500 points, with 503. St. Louis lost on a late Adam Vinatieri field goal, 20–17, as Faulk totaled 76 rushing yards and 54 receiving yards. Faulk had another excellent season, rushing 260 times for a career-high 1,382 yards (5.3 yards per carry), and catching 83 passes for 765 yards, for an NFC-leading total of 2,147 yards from scrimmage (second in the NFL only to Priest Holmes, who totaled 2,169 yards) and scoring 21 touchdowns despite once again missing 2 games to injuries. Faulk won the NFL's Offensive Player of the Year award for the third straight season, but finished second in a close vote to teammate Kurt Warner in the MVP vote. These years would be the climax of Faulk's career.

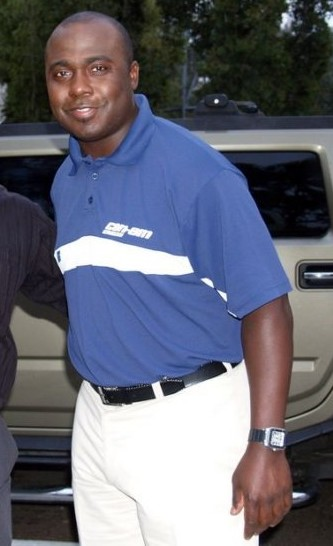
Faulk in 2008 in San Diego

Faulk's injuries and age would soon catch up to him; 2001 was the last of his 1,000-yard rushing seasons, and though he was still employed as the Rams' primary running back following the 2001 season, he was no longer the player he was in his prime, despite remaining a respected and effective player.

On July 29, 2002, Faulk signed a new seven-year, $43.95 million contract with the Rams. Faulk was about to enter the fourth year of his 1999 contract. In the new contract, Faulk received a $10.7 million signing bonus. In the 2002 season the Rams struggled and finished the year at 7–9. Faulk played in 14 games and started 10 and ended with 953 yards and 80 receptions. The following season, he played in and started 11 games, finishing with 818 yards and 45 receptions as the Rams rebounded with a 12–4 record.

In 2004, Faulk split time with rookie Steven Jackson and played in 14 games and rushing for 774 yards. In February 2005, Faulk agreed to a restructured contract to reduce his contract cap number. He was scheduled to make about $7.5 million in 2005. With the new contract he received a total of $6 million in the next two seasons and a $2 million signing bonus was included. The 2005 season was Faulk's last in the NFL. He rushed for only 292 yards on 65 carries and caught 44 passes for 291 yards and one touchdown. This marked the only time in his career where he did not have a rushing touchdown.

=== Injuries and retirement ===
On July 21, the Rams announced that Faulk would undergo reconstructive knee surgery and miss the entire 2006 NFL season. During the season Faulk served as an analyst for the NFL Network's NFL Total Access.

During an NBC Sunday Night Football halftime show, Faulk was asked by one of the announcers, "So are you retired or not?" Faulk said that he was still a Ram, and would be a Ram for the rest of his life. He then said that if the Rams would have him back, he would play next year, as he was able to run full speed on his re-built knees, but on March 26, 2007, Faulk announced his retirement from football.

On November 29, 2007, the Rams announced that they would be retiring Faulk's number. The ceremony was held during halftime of a Thursday night game against the Pittsburgh Steelers on December 20, 2007. In 2010 on the NFL Network's The Top 100: NFL's Greatest Players, Faulk was voted the number 70 player of all time.

In 2011, Faulk's first year of eligibility, he was elected into the Pro Football Hall of Fame. As a running back, he placed first in receiving yards (6,875), second in pass receptions (767), second in receiving touchdowns (36), third in yards from scrimmage (19,154), and tenth in rushing yards (12,280).

== NFL career statistics ==
Legend
	AP NFL MVP & OPOTY
	AP NFL Offensive Player of the Year
	Won the Super Bowl
	Led the league
**Bold**	Career high

=== Regular season ===
Year	Team	Games		Rushing					Receiving				
Year	Team	GP	GS	Att	Yds	Avg	Lng	TD	Rec	Yds	Avg	Lng	TD
1994	IND	16	16	314	1,282	4.1	52	11	52	522	10.0	**85T**	1
1995	IND	16	16	289	1,078	3.7	40	11	56	475	8.5	34	3
1996	IND	13	13	198	587	3.0	43	7	56	428	7.6	30	0
1997	IND	16	16	264	1,054	4.0	45	7	47	471	10.0	58	1
1998	IND	16	15	**324**	1,319	4.1	68T	6	86	908	10.6	78T	4
1999	STL	16	16	253	1,381	**5.5**	58	7	**87**	**1,048**	**12.0**	57T	5
2000	STL	14	14	253	1,359	5.4	36	**18**	81	830	10.2	72T	8
2001	STL	14	14	260	**1,382**	5.3	**71T**	12	83	765	9.2	65T	**9**
2002	STL	14	10	212	953	4.5	44	8	80	537	6.7	40	2
2003	STL	11	11	209	818	3.9	52	10	45	290	6.4	30	1
2004	STL	14	14	195	774	4.0	40	3	50	310	6.2	25	1
2005	STL	16	1	65	292	4.5	20	0	44	291	6.6	18	1
Career		176	156	2,836	12,279	4.3	71T	100	767	6,875	9.0	85T	36

=== Postseason ===
Year	Team	Games		Rushing					Receiving				
Year	Team	GP	GS	Att	Yds	Avg	Lng	TD	Rec	Yds	Avg	Lng	TD
1995	IND	1	1	1	16	**16.0**	16	0	0	0	0.0	0	0
1996	IND	1	1	9	25	2.8	7	0	3	10	7.6	3.3	0
1999	STL	3	3	38	82	2.2	11	1	13	**175**	13.5	**52**	**1**
2000	STL	1	1	14	24	1.7	4	0	7	99	**14.1**	35	**1**
2001	STL	3	3	**64**	**317**	5.0	**38**	**3**	**14**	114	8.1	23	0
2003	STL	1	1	19	53	2.8	8	1	9	78	8.7	25	0
2004	STL	2	2	20	85	4.3	13	1	6	43	7.2	14	0
Career		12	12	165	602	3.6	38	6	52	519	10.0	52	2

== Career highlights ==
=== Awards and honors ===
NFL

- Super Bowl champion (XXXIV)
- NFL Most Valuable Player (2000)
- 3× NFL Offensive Player of the Year (1999–2001)
- NFL Offensive Rookie of the Year (1994)
- 3× First-team All-Pro (1999–2001)
- 3× Second-team All-Pro (1994, 1995, 1998)
- 7× Pro Bowl (1994, 1995, 1998–2002)
- Pro Bowl MVP (1994)
- NFL rushing touchdowns leader (2000)
- 2× NFL scoring leader (2000, 2001)
- Bert Bell Award (2001)
- PFWA All-Rookie Team (1994)
- The Sporting News Athlete of the Year (2000)
- 2× The Sporting News NFL Player of the Year (2000, 2001)
- No. 70 on The Top 100: NFL's Greatest Players
- St. Louis Football Ring of Fame
- Indianapolis Colts Ring of Honor
- Los Angeles Rams No. 28 retired

College

- Jim Brown Trophy (1992)
- WAC Offensive Player of the Year (1992)
- 2× Unanimous All-American (1992, 1993)
- First-team All-American (1991)
- 3× First-team All-WAC (1991–1993)
- NCAA rushing touchdowns leader (1991)
- NCAA rushing yards leader (1992)
- 2× NCAA scoring leader (1991, 1993)
- WAC Freshman of the Year (1991)
- San Diego State Aztecs No. 28 retired

=== NFL records ===
- Fastest player to gain 16,000 yards from scrimmage: 129 games
- Fastest player to gain 17,000 yards from scrimmage: 142 games
- Fastest player to gain 1,000 yards from scrimmage in a season: 6 (1083 yards in 2000, tied with Jim Brown)
- Most two point conversions, career: 7
- Most consecutive seasons with 2,000 yards from scrimmage: 4
- Most consecutive seasons with 5+ rushing touchdowns: 10 (1994–2003, tied with LaDainian Tomlinson)
- Most consecutive games with 4+ touchdowns: 2 (tied with Jim Taylor and LaDainian Tomlinson)
- Most receiving yards by a running back in a season: 1,048
- Most consecutive games with a reception by a running back (min. 5 carries per game): 158
- Most games with 200 yards from scrimmage: 14
- Most games with 250 yards from scrimmage: 5
- Most games with both a rushing and receiving touchdown, career: 15
- Only player with 70+ rushing TDs and 30+ receiving TDs
- Only player with 12,000 yards rushing and 6,000 yards receiving in a career
- Only player to have 200 yards receiving and 50 yards rushing in the same game - December 26, 1999
- Only player to have 200 yards receiving and 10 rushing attempts in the same game - December 26, 1999

== Post-NFL career ==
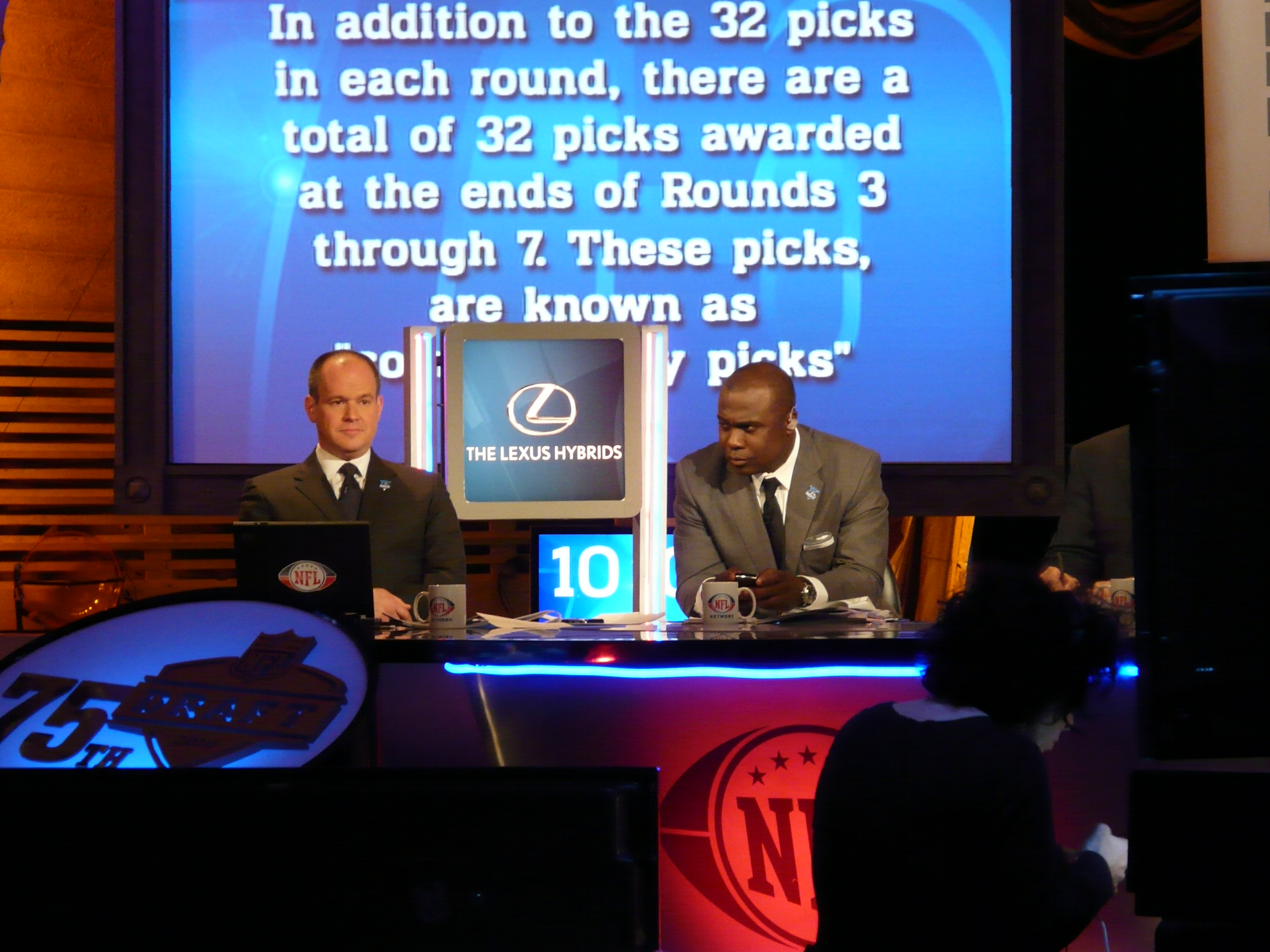
Faulk (right) and Rich Eisen during the 2010 NFL draft

Faulk was a longtime NFL Network analyst. He served as an analyst on NFL Total Access, where he provided a player's perspective on today's game. He also appeared on Thursday Night Football's pre-game, halftime and post-game shows, and Sunday's NFL GameDay Morning. Faulk was suspended from the network on December 12, 2017, along with fellow ex-players Heath Evans and Ike Taylor, after sexual harassment allegations were made against the three by a former network wardrobe stylist.

Faulk played himself in season 1, episode 12 of the sitcom Life in Pieces. This episode first aired on January 7, 2016, on CBS.

Faulk was inducted into the Pro Football Hall of Fame in 2011 in his first year of eligibility. He was also inducted into the Indianapolis Colts Ring of Honor during the week 15 game against the Houston Texans on December 15, 2013, along with Eric Dickerson, another former Colt running back (who also played for the Rams, albeit when they were in Los Angeles).

=== Coaching career ===
On February 6, 2025, Faulk was hired as running backs coach for the Colorado Buffaloes football team of the Big 12 Conference.

On November 29, 2025, Faulk was hired as head coach of the Southern Jaguars football team of the Southwestern Athletic Conference.

== Personal life ==
Faulk was married to Lindsay Stoudt from 2006 to 2014. He has six children, including three with Stoudt. His son, Marshall Faulk Jr., played running back for the Central Washington Wildcats.

Faulk has a charitable foundation in San Diego. His childhood friend Tyrone Wilson helped him start his foundation. Faulk is a cousin of Kevin Faulk, a former NFL running back and cousin of former NFL linebacker Trev Faulk.

In 2009, Faulk was inducted into the San Diego Hall of Champions.

Since at least 2019, Faulk has served as a spokesman for the Foundation for a Drug-Free World, a Scientology front group.

On October 22, 2026, Faulk revealed he had been diagnosed with Parkinson's disease about eighteen months prior.

== Head coaching record ==
Year	Team	Overall	Conference	Standing	Bowl/playoffs
Southern Jaguars (Southwestern Athletic Conference) (2026–present)
2026	Southern	2–4	0–2		
Southern:		2–4	0–2		
Total:		2–4			
National championship Conference title Conference division title or championship game berth
^{†}Indicates CFP / New Years' Six bowl.; ^{#}Rankings from final Coaches Poll.; ^{°}Rankings from final AP Poll.

== See also ==
- List of NCAA Division I FBS players with at least 50 career rushing touchdowns
- List of NCAA major college football yearly rushing leaders
- List of NCAA major college football yearly scoring leaders
- List of National Football League career rushing yards leaders
- List of National Football League career all-purpose yards leaders
- List of National Football League annual rushing touchdowns leaders
- List of National Football League career rushing attempts leaders
- List of National Football League career rushing touchdowns leaders
