= Chris Johnson (running back) =

American football player (born 1985)

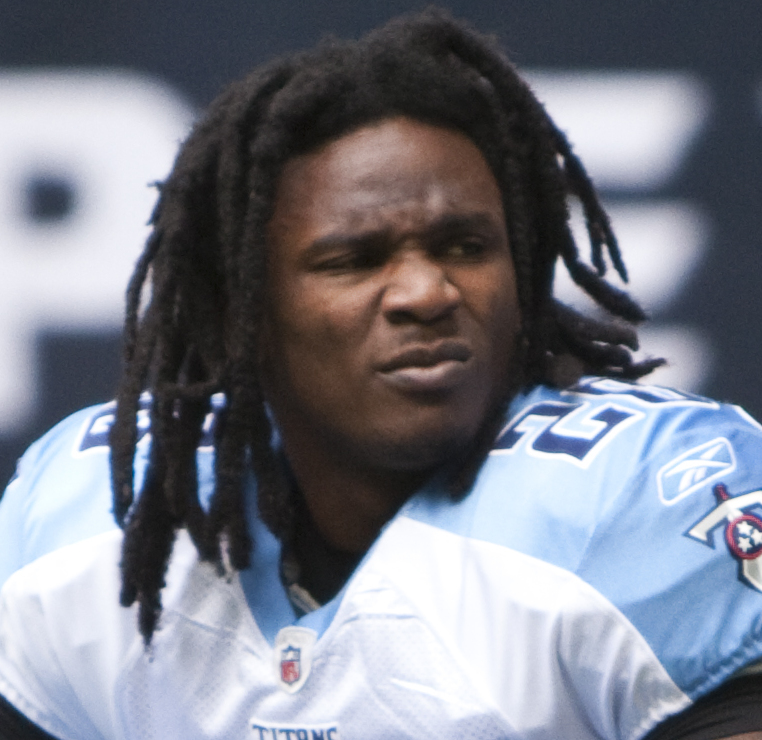
- Johnson with the Tennessee Titans in 2010

No. 28, 21, 23
- Position: Running back

Personal information
- Born: September 23, 1985 (age 41); Orlando, Florida, U.S.
- Listed height: 5 ft 11 in (1.80 m)
- Listed weight: 203 lb (92 kg)

Career information
- High school: Olympia (Orlando)
- College: East Carolina (2004–2007)
- NFL draft: 2008: 1st round, 24th overall pick

Career history
- Tennessee Titans (2008–2013); New York Jets (2014); Arizona Cardinals (2015–2017)

Awards and highlights
- NFL Offensive Player of the Year (2009); First-team All-Pro (2009); 3× Pro Bowl (2008–2010); NFL rushing yards leader (2009); PFWA All-Rookie Team (2008); Tennessee Titans Ring of Honor; C-USA Special Teams POY (2007); 2× First-team All-C-USA (2006, 2007); NFL record: 2,509 yards from scrimmage, season (2009)

Career NFL statistics
- Rushing yards: 9,651
- Rushing average: 4.5
- Rushing touchdowns: 55
- Receptions: 307
- Receiving yards: 2,255
- Receiving touchdowns: 9
- Stats at Pro Football Reference

Christopher Duan Johnson (born September 23, 1985) is an American former professional football running back. Born in Orlando, Florida, he emerged as a senior for East Carolina University, breaking out for 2,960 all-purpose yards and 24 touchdowns. Johnson was selected by the Tennessee Titans in the first round of the 2008 NFL draft, after running a then-record breaking 4.24 seconds in the 40-yard dash at the NFL Combine.

Johnson was a Pro Bowl selection in each of his first three years in the league. In 2009, Johnson won the NFL rushing title with 2,006 yards, becoming the sixth of only nine players ever to rush for over 2,000 yards in a season, and breaking Marshall Faulk's record of total yards from scrimmage with 2,509. This earned Johnson the nickname CJ2K and won him the 2009 Offensive Player of the Year Award. Johnson rushed for more than 1,000 yards in each of his six seasons with the Titans. Johnson played one season for the New York Jets followed by three with the Arizona Cardinals, with whom he enjoyed a brief, injury-shortened resurgence in 2015. Johnson retired after the 2017 season, signing a one-day contract with the Titans.

== Early life ==
Johnson was born in Orlando, Florida, on September 23, 1985. He played football at Olympia High School in Orlando. Considered only a two-star recruit by Rivals.com, Johnson was not ranked among the nation's top running back prospects in 2004. He selected East Carolina over Eastern Kentucky, USF and UConn.

=== Track and field ===
Johnson was also a standout track star at Olympia High School. As a senior, he finished second in the 100 metres at the 2004 Florida 4A state championships behind Walter Dix. Johnson also finished his senior season posting personal bests of 10.38 and 21.28 (the nation's 24th fastest in 2004) in the 100 metres and 200 metres respectively.

As a junior, Johnson qualified for the finals of the Florida State meet with a preliminary time of 10.83 seconds. He placed fourth with a time of 10.66 while also anchoring the 4 × 100 meters relay team that won Golden South and Golden West National Championships.

Johnson's personal records are 10.38 seconds in the 100 meters and 21.28 seconds in the 200 meters.

== College career ==
Johnson accepted a scholarship to East Carolina University, majoring in communications, where he played for the East Carolina Pirates. After retiring, Johnson returned to school and graduated in 2020. He was inducted into the Senior Bowl Hall of Fame on June 25, 2023.

=== 2004 season ===
As a freshman, Johnson made an immediate impact in all 11 games, as he eventually started seven games on the season. Johnson finished the season on the Conference USA All-Freshman squad as a running back. He recorded a reception in 10 straight games, which was a team-best. Johnson finished the season with 561 yards rushing and 765 yards on kick returns for 1,562 all-purpose yards, all team-highs. He finished the season by being ranked 24th nationally for all-purpose yardage, and also rushed for five touchdowns. Johnson finished the season with eight school game or season records for a freshman and finished the year with 32 catches for 236 yards and two touchdowns, second on the team. In his collegiate debut against West Virginia, Johnson returned five kickoffs for a total of 100 yards. Against Louisville, Johnson returned seven kickoffs for 102 yards. In a victory over Tulane, he set season-highs with 31 carries for 158 yards and two scores. Against South Florida, Johnson totaled 212 all-purpose yards and scored ECU's only offensive touchdown on an 18-yard reception. In the season finale against NC State, Johnson totaled a season-high 144 kickoff return yards.

=== 2005 season ===
After his memorable freshman season, Johnson started all 11 games at tailback as a sophomore. He led the team with 684 yards on 176 carries and six touchdowns, while also recording 35 receptions for 356 yards and two scores and 459 kickoff return yards. Johnson was also the team leader with 1,499 all-purpose yards and set a school record with 67 career receptions as a running back. Against the West Virginia Mountaineers, he rushed for 92 yards on 22 carries, both team highs. In the Southern Mississippi game, Johnson returned four kickoffs for 100 yards. In the Rice victory, he totaled 129 receiving yards, including an 81-yard touchdown reception. Johnson's -yard receiving game teamed-up with Aundrae Allison's 109 yards marked the first dual 100-yard receiving game since 1999 for the Pirates. In the Tulsa game, Johnson did not record a reception which ended his consecutive streak at 18 games. However, in the following game against Marshall, Johnson carried the ball 18 times for 106 yards and a career-high three touchdowns.

=== 2006 season ===
After missing spring practice due to neck surgery, Johnson returned in his junior season with 972 all-purpose yards. In the down season, Johnson totaled 314 rushing yards, 176 receiving yards, and 482 kickoff return yards. He played in 12 games on the season but only started five. Johnson was selected to the All-Conference USA first-team as a return specialist after the season. He also broke the school career record for receiving yards as a running back with 768 yards, but only had one 100-yard rushing game on the year and only had four rushing scores. During the season opener against Navy, Johnson only recorded 54 all-purpose yards with one rushing touchdown. In the UAB game, Johnson had 112 all-purpose yards. In the Memphis game, Johnson recorded his only 100-yard rushing game with 106 yards on 22 carries for two touchdowns. He finished the game with 180 all-purpose yards. Johnson had a foot injury that limited his action in the West Virginia game, and caused him to miss the Virginia game. In the SMU game, Johnson returned a kickoff for a career-long 51 yards. Then, in the Southern Miss game, Johnson recorded 136 all-purpose yards that included a 96-yard kickoff return for a touchdown, his second career return touchdown. The return also made national recognition on ESPN's top plays. Against Rice, Johnson carried the ball 12 times for 83 yards.

=== 2007 season ===
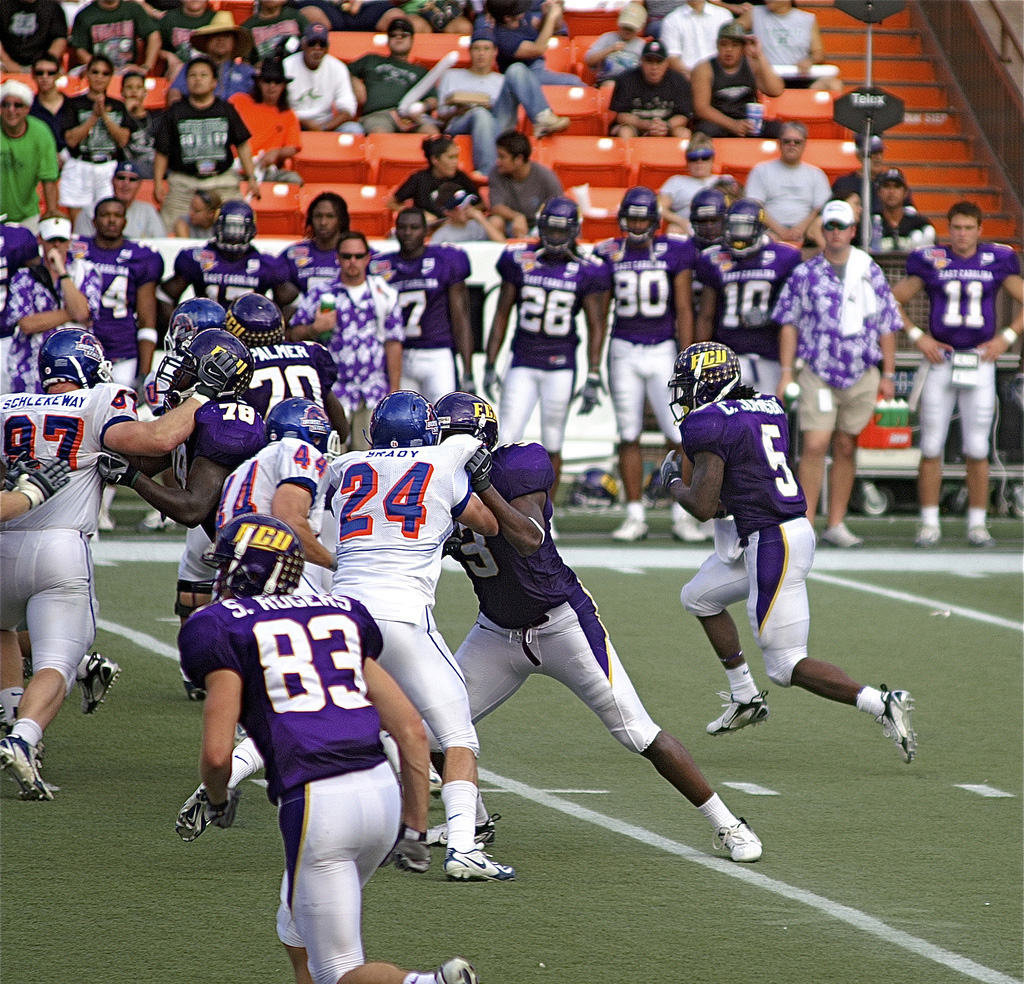
Johnson rushing the ball on a play during the 2007 Hawaii Bowl.

After an average junior season, Johnson entered his senior season as a preseason All-Conference USA first-team as a return specialist. However, Johnson finished the season as a first-team selection as returner and second-team selection as a running back. He began the season with a rushing score in the 17–7 loss to Virginia Tech. Johnson followed that performance up with a career-high 136 yards on 5 five receptions for two touchdowns, including a 78-yard touchdown reception, and also a rushing touchdown against North Carolina. In the 48–7 loss to West Virginia, Johnson rushed for 76 yards on 14 carries and also scored ECU's only touchdown of the game. After a slow start rushing on the season, Johnson rushed for 147 yards on 24 carries with two touchdowns against Houston in the narrow 37–35 victory. In the Central Florida victory, Johnson rushed for 89 yards with two scores, caught five receptions for 89 yards and a touchdown, and returned four kickoffs for 194 yards with a 96-yard touchdown return. He finished the game with a then career-high 272 all-purpose yards and four touchdowns. The next game, against UTEP, Johnson rushed for 126 yards on 23 carries. Then, in the 56–40 victory over Memphis, Johnson rushed for a career-high 301 yards and four touchdowns. He also had four kick returns for 95 yards for a then career-high 396 all-purpose yards and four touchdowns in the game. In the following loss to Marshall, Johnson rushed for 72 yards and a score and 45 receiving yards for a total of 117 all-purpose yards. Then, in the 35–12 victory over Tulane, Johnson rushed for 155 yards on 27 carries for two scores and caught four passes for 85 yards and another score for 240 all-purpose yards and three scores.

In Johnson's final collegiate game, the 2007 Hawai'i Bowl against Boise State, Johnson rushed for 223 yards on 28 carries and a touchdown as the Pirates won, 41–38. Johnson also had three receptions for 32 yards and a score and had six kick returns for 153 yards for a career-high and NCAA FBS record of 408 all-purpose yards and two scores.

== Professional career ==
=== Pre-draft ===
Prior to the NFL Scouting Combine, Johnson was projected as a second- to third-round draft pick in the 2008 NFL draft. However, at the combine he registered a time of 4.24 seconds and tied the all-time mark set by Rondel Menendez, a wide receiver from Eastern Kentucky, in 1999—the first year the combine used electronic timers (his record was later broken by John Ross in 2017 with a time of 4.22). Johnson was also fifth highest among running backs in the vertical jump with a 35-inch jump. His 10-foot, 10-inch broad jump was third best among the running backs.

Pre-draft measurables
Height	Weight	Arm length	Hand span	40-yard dash	10-yard split	20-yard split	Vertical jump	Broad jump	Wonderlic
5 ft 11 in (1.80 m)	197 lb (89 kg)	30 3/4 in (0.78 m)	8 1/2 in (0.22 m)	4.24 s	1.40 s	2.41 s	35 in (0.89 m)	10 ft 10 in (3.30 m)	10/21
All values from NFL Combine; Wonderlic test taken twice

=== Tennessee Titans ===
==== 2008–2010: Peak career ====
Johnson was drafted by the Tennessee Titans in the first round (24th overall) of the 2008 NFL draft. He was the highest East Carolina player selected in the NFL Draft since linebacker Robert Jones went 24th overall in the 1992 NFL draft. On July 26, Johnson signed a five-year, $12 million contract with $7 million guaranteed.

Johnson had his professional debut with the Titans on September 7, 2008, where he played in the season opener against the Jacksonville Jaguars, which the Titans won 17–10. Johnson rushed for 93 yards on 15 carries and had three receptions for 34 yards and a touchdown. In only his second career game, Johnson ran for 109 yards on 19 carries, including a 51-yard run, and two receptions for 12 yards against the Cincinnati Bengals.

On September 28, Johnson rushed for the first touchdown of his career against the Minnesota Vikings. Johnson finished the game with 75 all-purpose yards (61 rushing, 14 receiving) and two touchdowns. In only his sixth professional game, he rushed for 168 yards and a touchdown on only 18 carries against the Kansas City Chiefs on October 19, 2008. Johnson finished the season with 1,228 yards on 251 carries for a 4.9 ypc and 43 receptions for 260 yards and 10 total touchdowns in 15 games. He led all rookies in rushing yards per game with 81.9 ypg.

Johnson finished second in AP Rookie of the Year voting to Matt Ryan and was elected to the 2009 Pro Bowl.

Johnson split carries with running back LenDale White for the duration of the 2008 season. White finished the 2008 season with 773 yards on 200 carries for a 3.9 ypc and 15 rushing touchdowns. They nicknamed this RB tandem "Smash and Dash." Smash referred to White due to his power, and Dash referred to Johnson due to his unusual quickness and speed. Entering into the 2009 season, however, Johnson dismissed the nickname of "Smash and Dash" and named himself "Every Coach's Dream."

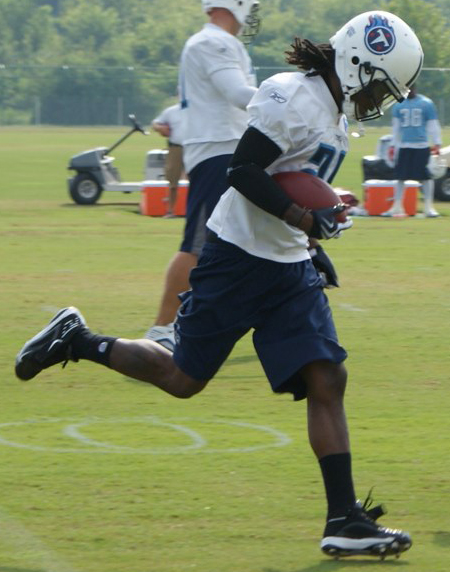
Johnson at training camp in 2009

Some consider Johnson's 2009 season to be one of the best ever in NFL history for a running back. He started the season off with 57 rushing yards in a 13–10 loss to the Pittsburgh Steelers. In the next game, a 34–31 loss to the Houston Texans, he had 16 carries for 197 rushing yards and two rushing touchdowns to go along with nine receptions for 87 yards and a receiving touchdown. Over the next three games, Johnson combined for 214 rushing yards. In the next game, a 59–0 loss to the New England Patriots, he had 128 rushing yards. In the next game, a 30–13 victory over the Jacksonville Jaguars, he had 24 carries for 228 yards and two touchdowns. He followed that up with 135 rushing yards and two rushing touchdowns against the San Francisco 49ers. The next week, against the Buffalo Bills, he had 132 rushing yards and his third consecutive game with two rushing touchdowns to go along with nine receptions for 100 yards. In the next game, against the Houston Texans, he was held out of the endzone but had 151 rushing yards on 29 carries. He followed that up with 154 rushing yards and a rushing touchdown in the 20–17 victory over the Arizona Cardinals. On December 13, against the St. Louis Rams, he had 117 rushing yards and two rushing touchdowns to go along with three receptions for 69 yards and a receiving touchdown in the 47–7 victory. In Week 16, on Christmas Day, he had 142 rushing yards and a touchdown in a loss to the San Diego Chargers. In the regular season finale against the Seahawks, he had 36 carries for 134 yards and two touchdowns in the 17–13 victory. Overall, Johnson rushed for 2,006 yards and finished the year with 11 consecutive games with at least 100 rushing yards to become one of only nine players in NFL history to be in the 2,000 rushing yards club. He averaged 5.6 yards per carry and 125.4 yards per game to lead the league. He had 2,509 total yards from scrimmage, breaking Marshall Faulk's single-season record. He was named the NFL's Offensive Player of the Year in 2009. After his 2009 season, he was named to his second Pro Bowl and the media referred to him as "CJ2K".

To start the 2010 NFL season, the Titans took on the Oakland Raiders at LP Field. Johnson scored on a 76-yard touchdown run in the second quarter and again on a 4-yard run in the third. Johnson had a slow start to the game but finished with 142 yards on 27 carries with a yard per carry average of 5.3 yards to bring his streak of 100-yard rushing games to 12.

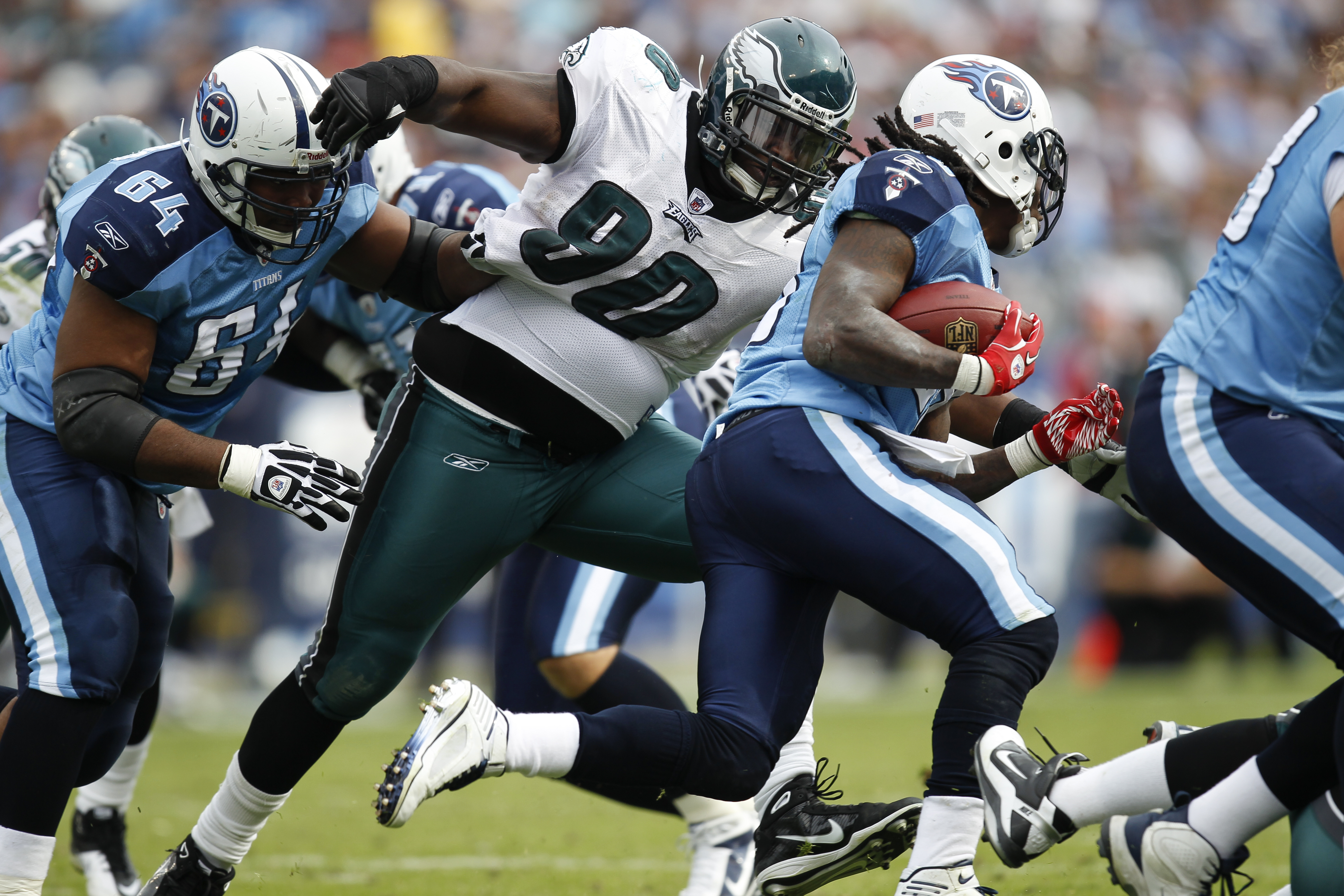
Johnson in 2010

The next week, the Titans took on the Pittsburgh Steelers. The Steelers ended Johnson's streak of 100 yard games and limited him to only 34 yards. He did have an 85-yard touchdown run, but it was called back on a holding penalty. The Titans then took on the New York Giants. Johnson had 125 yards on 32 carries. He would next have yet another 100 yard game against the Dallas Cowboys gaining 131 yards on 19 carries along with two touchdowns one of which ended up being the game winner with 3:28 left. In the next game, against the Jacksonville Jaguars, he had 111 rushing yards and a rushing touchdown. On November 14, against the Miami Dolphins, he had 117 rushing yard and a rushing touchdown. In the next game, a 19–16 loss to the Washington Redskins, he had 130 rushing yards. After dreadful performances against the Houston Texans and Jaguars, Johnson bounced back to rush for 110 yard and one touchdown against the Indianapolis Colts. In Week 15, in the second game against the Texans, he had 130 rushing yards and a rushing touchdown in the 31–17 victory. Overall, Johnson finished the 2010 season with 1,364 rushing yards and 11 rushing touchdowns. On January 14, 2011, he was selected to the 2011 Pro Bowl, his third in three years. Johnson was ranked 13th by his fellow players on the NFL Top 100 Players of 2011.

==== 2011–2013: Mid-career ====
During the summer training camp prior to the 2011 season, Johnson initially did not show up to camp, pending contract negotiations. Johnson felt he was due a considerably larger sum of money. As the leading rusher since 2008 (4,598 yards) he was set to make $1.065 million in 2011, under existing contract terms (approximately 10% of the money paid to the second-place rusher for the same period). On September 1, Johnson became the highest paid running back in the NFL, agreeing to a four-year, $53.5 million contract extension through to the 2016 season, including $30 million guaranteed, with the Titans, ending his holdout.

In early November, a report surfaced that Johnson could be released by the Titans prior to the fifth day of the 2012 league year, which begins every March. At the time of the report, Johnson was having the worst season of his career with just 302 rushing yards and one touchdown on 107 carries through the season's first seven games. Johnson's contract calls for an $8 million salary in 2012 that became guaranteed in March; he also will receive a guaranteed salary of $9 million since the fifth day of the 2013 league year passed. If the Titans had released Johnson prior the March 2012 deadline, they would have saved $17 million and Johnson would have become a free agent. On November 13, he had 130 rushing yards and a rushing touchdown against the Carolina Panthers. Two weeks later, he had 190 rushing yards against the Tampa Bay Buccaneers. in the next game, against the Buffalo Bills, he had 153 rushing yards and two rushing touchdowns.

During the 2011 season, Johnson struggled throughout the season under offensive coordinator Chris Palmer. However, he still finished with 1,047 rushing yards and four rushing touchdowns. After a frustrating season, Johnson elected to participate in the Titans' off-season training program in preparation for the 2012 season. He was ranked 100th by his fellow players on the NFL Top 100 Players of 2012.

After participating in the Titans' summer training camp prior to the 2012 season, Johnson initially struggled during his first two games of the 2012 season gaining just 21 yards on a total of 19 rushing attempts, highlighted by an 11 carry, 4-yard effort against the New England Patriots. During recent interviews, Johnson appeared to be frustrated with the new direction Titan's offensive coordinator Chris Palmer is running, electing to bring a more run-and-shoot offensive scheme to the Titans and not focusing on establishing the rushing attack. Palmer was fired later on in the season. In Week 4, he finally showed his abilities with 25 carries for 141 yards, but Tennessee still lost 38–14 to the Houston Texans. He followed that up with only 24 yards on 15 carries against the Minnesota Vikings. On Thursday Night Football, he ran for 91 yards on 19 carries against the Pittsburgh Steelers in a 26–23 victory. He followed that up with a great game against the Buffalo Bills in which he ran for 195 yards and 2 touchdowns on only 18 carries. With an 83-yard touchdown, Johnson broke an NFL record with his fourth rushing touchdown of 80 yards or more. The Titans won the game, 35–34. He then ran for 99 yards on 21 carries in an overtime loss to the Indianapolis Colts, 19–13. He got off to a relatively slow start against the Chicago Bears, fumbling twice. In the fourth quarter, he ran for an 80-yard touchdown, extending his record with his fifth 80-yard touchdowns. He finished with 16 carries for 141 yards, but the Titans still lost 51–20. In the next game, he ran for 126 yards on 23 carries and a 17-yard touchdown ending the Miami Dolphins streak of 22 consecutive games without allowing a 100-yard rusher. He then ran for 80 yards on 21 carries against the Jacksonville Jaguars, however the Titans lost, 24–19. In the next week against the Houston Texans, he got a 26-yard run on Tennessee's opening drive but finished with only 51 yards on 13 carries. After the game, he said he was frustrated with the lack of carries. In week 14 against the Colts, he struggled to get anything going only running for 44 yards on 19 carries. In week 15 on Monday Night Football, Johnson had a franchise-record 94-yard touchdown run, the longest of his career and the second longest in Monday Night Football history. He finished with 122 yards on 21 carries. The Titans beat the New York Jets, 14–10. Overall, he finished the 2012 season with 1,243 rushing yards and six rushing touchdowns.

Johnson started the 2013 season with 25 carries for 70 yards in a 16–9 victory over the Pittsburgh Steelers. On November 3, against the St. Louis Rams, he had 150 rushing yards and two rushing touchdowns. On November 14, he had 86 rushing yards and two rushing touchdowns against the Indianapolis Colts. In the regular season finale against the Houston Texans, he had 127 rushing yards and a rushing touchdown in the 16–10 victory. He rushed for 1,077 yards on 279 carries with six touchdowns in 16 games. The 2013 season was less productive statistically for Johnson than any other year of his career up to that point.

On April 4, 2014, the Titans released Johnson.

=== New York Jets ===
Johnson agreed to a three-year contract worth $9 million per year with the New York Jets on April 16, 2014. Johnson finished the 2014 season with 153 carries for a career-low 663 yards and one touchdown.

The Jets declined the second year of Johnson's contract on February 15, 2015, making him a free agent in the 2015 offseason.

=== Arizona Cardinals ===
==== 2015: Resurgent season ====
On August 17, 2015, Johnson agreed to a one-year, $2.56 million contract with the Arizona Cardinals. Johnson was having a great season and was in the top three in rushing yards for more than half of the season, looking like his great past performance in Tennessee. Some of his notable games included a 110-yard, two-touchdown performance against the San Francisco 49ers and 122 yards, and on October 26, a touchdown against the Baltimore Ravens. On November 29, 2015, Johnson suffered a fractured tibia during the Week 12 matchup against the San Francisco 49ers. He was then placed on the injured reserve with a designation to return list on December 1, 2015. Johnson finished the 2015 regular season with 196 carries for 814 yards and three touchdowns, along with being named a Pro Bowl alternate.

==== 2016–2017: Final years ====
Johnson re-signed with the Cardinals on a one-year, $3 million contract on March 17, 2016. The emergence of David Johnson as a star running back for the Cardinals limited Chris Johnson's use. On October 4, 2016, he was placed on injured reserve with a groin injury. He finished the season with 95 rushing yards and a rushing touchdown on 25 carries.

On July 20, 2017, the Cardinals re-signed Johnson on a one-year contract. He was released on September 1, 2017. On September 12, 2017, Johnson re-signed with the Arizona Cardinals.

Johnson was released by the team on October 10, 2017. He had played in four games in the 2017 season and had 114 rushing yards on 45 carries.

=== Retirement ===
On November 5, 2018, Johnson announced his retirement from the NFL after 10 seasons in the league.

On April 24, 2019, Johnson signed a one-day contract to retire as a member of the Tennessee Titans.

== Career statistics ==
Legend
	AP NFL Offensive Player of the Year
	Led the league
**Bold**	Career high

=== NFL ===
==== Regular season ====
Year	Team	Games		Rushing					Receiving					Fumbles	
Year	Team	GP	GS	Att	Yds	Avg	Lng	TD	Rec	Yds	Avg	Lng	TD	Fum	Lost
2008	TEN	15	14	251	1,228	4.9	66T	9	43	260	6.0	25	1	1	1
2009	TEN	16	16	**358**	**2,006**	**5.6**	91T	**14**	50	**503**	**10.1**	**69T**	2	3	3
2010	TEN	16	16	316	1,364	4.3	76T	11	44	245	5.6	25	1	3	2
2011	TEN	16	16	262	1,047	4.0	48T	4	**57**	418	7.3	34	0	3	1
2012	TEN	16	15	276	1,243	4.5	**94T**	6	34	219	6.4	22	0	**5**	**4**
2013	TEN	16	16	279	1,077	3.9	30T	6	42	345	8.2	66T	**4**	3	2
2014	NYJ	16	6	155	663	4.3	47	1	24	151	6.3	26	1	0	0
2015	ARI	11	9	196	814	4.2	62	3	6	58	9.7	40	0	2	2
2016	ARI	4	0	25	95	3.8	18	1	0	0	0.0	0	0	0	0
2017	ARI	4	3	45	114	2.5	11	0	5	43	8.6	15	0	0	0
Career		130	111	2,163	9,651	4.5	94T	55	307	2,255	7.3	69T	9	21	16

==== Postseason ====
Year	Team	Games		Rushing					Receiving					Fumbles	
Year	Team	GP	GS	Att	Yds	Avg	Lng	TD	Rec	Yds	Avg	Lng	TD	Fum	Lost
2008	TEN	1	1	11	72	6.5	32	1	1	28	28.0	28	0	0	0
2015	ARI	0	0	Did not play due to injury											
Career		1	1	11	72	6.5	32	1	1	28	28.0	28	0	0	0

=== College ===
Season	Team	GP	Rushing						Receiving					Kick returns				
Season	Team	GP	Att	Yds	Avg	Y/G	Lng	TD	Rec	Yds	Avg	Lng	TD	Ret	Yds	Avg	Lng	TD
2004	ECU	11	134	561	4.2	51.0	**86**	5	32	236	7.4	29	2	**37**	765	20.7	39	0
2005	ECU	11	176	684	3.9	62.2	39	6	35	356	10.2	**81**	2	21	459	21.9	43	0
2006	ECU	12	78	314	4.0	26.2	43	4	21	176	8.4	17	0	22	482	21.9	96	**1**
2007	ECU	13	**236**	**1,423**	**6.0**	**109.5**	70	**17**	**37**	**528**	**14.3**	78	**6**	36	**1,009**	**28.0**	**99**	**1**
Total		47	624	2,982	4.8	63.4	86	32	125	1,296	10.4	81	10	116	2,715	23.4	99	2

== Career highlights ==
=== Awards and honors ===
NFL

- NFL Offensive Player of the Year (2009)
- First-team All-Pro (2009)
- 3× Pro Bowl (2008–2010)
- NFL rushing yards leader (2009)
- PFWA All-Rookie Team (2008)
- FedEx Ground Player of the Year (2009)
- 3× NFL Top 100 — 13th (2011), 100th (2012), 62nd (2013)

College

- C-USA Special Teams POY (2007)
- 2× First-team All-C-USA (2006, 2007)

Other honors

- Tennessee Sports Hall of Fame (2024)

=== NFL records ===
- Only player in NFL history with a touchdown of 50 yards, 60 yards, and 90 yards in one game. (a 57-yard rush, a 69-yard reception, and a 91-yard rush during Week 2 against the Texans, 2009)
- Most total scrimmage yards in one single season: 2,509 (2009)
- Most total scrimmage yards in one month: 968 (November 2009)
- Only player in NFL history with 6 touchdown runs of over 80 yards (80, 83, 85, 89, 91, 94). No other player has more than four.
- Only player in NFL history with 4 touchdown runs of over 85 yards (85, 89, 91, 94).
- Only player in NFL history to run for three 80-yard touchdown runs in a single season on more than one occasion (2009, 2012).
- First player in NFL history with 6 consecutive games of 125+ rushing yards and a 5.0+ yards per carry average (Breaking Jim Brown's record set in 1958 of five consecutive games).
- First player in NFL history with at least 1,900 rushing yards and 400 receiving yards in the same season (2009)
- First player in NFL history with at least 1,900 rushing yards and 50 receptions in the same season (2009)
- Second most consecutive games rushing for more than 100 yards (12, October 18, 2009 – September 12, 2010; first is Barry Sanders with 14).
- One of two players to have 2,000 rushing yard in a season but under 10,000 in a career (other is Terrell Davis).

== Television appearances ==
In 2013, Johnson appeared on an episode of Ink Master as a special guest judge.

Before the 2013 NFL season, Johnson participated in the National Geographic's "Man v. Cheetah" documentary. On the show Johnson raced a cheetah on a 220-foot-long course with a wall separating them. The cheetah won.

== Personal life ==
Johnson and his wife Brittany have four children together.

In 2025, Johnson was diagnosed with amyotrophic lateral sclerosis (ALS). By the time he made the diagnosis public, in a June 29, 2026, interview on Good Morning America with Michael Strahan, the disease had progressed to the point he had to use a speech-producing device to talk. After his announcement, numerous former NFL players including Adrian Peterson, Steve Gleason and Deion Sanders among others revived the Ice Bucket Challenge in support of Johnson, as well as NFL Commissioner Roger Goodell.

=== 2015 shooting ===
In the early morning of March 8, 2015, Johnson was shot in the shoulder during a drive-by in Orlando, Florida, in which the driver of the vehicle, Dreekius Oricko Johnson, was killed. Reggie Johnson, who also was in the car, sustained injuries to the shoulder, leg, and hand.
