= The Sporting News NFL Player of the Year =

American professional footaball award

The Sporting News (formerly Sporting News from 2002 to 2022) began awarding a National Football League (NFL) player of the year award in 1954. From 1970 to 1979, The Sporting News chose American Football Conference (AFC) and National Football Conference (NFC) players of the year, and returned to a single winner in 1980. Beginning in 2008 The Sporting News chose an offensive player of the year and a defensive player of the year.

== Winners ==
=== 1954–1969 ===
Season	Player	Position	Team
1954	Lou Groza	T/K	Cleveland
1955	Otto Graham	QB	Cleveland
1956	Frank Gifford	RB	NY Giants
1957	Jim Brown	FB	Cleveland
1958	Jim Brown	FB	Cleveland
1959	Johnny Unitas	QB	Baltimore
1960	Norm Van Brocklin	QB	Philadelphia
1961	Paul Hornung	RB	Green Bay
1962	Y. A. Tittle	QB	NY Giants
1963	Y. A. Tittle	QB	NY Giants
1964	Johnny Unitas	QB	Baltimore
1965	Jim Brown	RB	Cleveland
1966	Bart Starr	QB	Green Bay
1967	Johnny Unitas	QB	Baltimore
1968	Earl Morrall	QB	Baltimore
1969	Roman Gabriel	QB	LA Rams

=== 1970–1979 ===
Season	NFC			AFC		
Season	Player	Position	Team	Player	Position	Team
1970	John Brodie	QB	San Francisco	George Blanda	QB/K	Oakland
1971	Roger Staubach	QB	Dallas	Bob Griese	QB	Miami
1972	Larry Brown	RB	Washington	Earl Morrall	QB	Miami
1973	John Hadl	QB	LA Rams	O. J. Simpson	RB	Buffalo
1974	Chuck Foreman	RB	Minnesota	Ken Stabler	QB	Oakland
1975	Fran Tarkenton	QB	Minnesota	O. J. Simpson	RB	Buffalo
1976	Walter Payton	RB	Chicago	Ken Stabler	QB	Oakland
1977	Walter Payton	RB	Chicago	Craig Morton	QB	Denver
1978	Archie Manning	QB	New Orleans	Earl Campbell	RB	Houston
1979	Ottis Anderson	RB	St. Louis	Dan Fouts	QB	San Diego

=== 1980–2007 ===
Season	Player	Team	Position
1980	Brian Sipe	QB	Cleveland
1981	Ken Anderson	QB	Cincinnati
1982	Mark Moseley	K	Washington
1983	Eric Dickerson	RB	LA Rams
1984	Dan Marino	QB	Miami
1985	Marcus Allen	RB	LA Raiders
1986	Lawrence Taylor	LB	NY Giants
1987	Jerry Rice	WR	San Francisco
1988	Boomer Esiason	QB	Cincinnati
1989	Joe Montana	QB	San Francisco
1990	Jerry Rice	WR	San Francisco
1991	Thurman Thomas	RB	Buffalo
1992	Steve Young	QB	San Francisco
1993	Emmitt Smith	RB	Dallas
1994	Steve Young	QB	San Francisco
1995	Brett Favre	QB	Green Bay
1996	Brett Favre	QB	Green Bay
1997	Barry Sanders	RB	Detroit
1998	Terrell Davis	RB	Denver
1999	Kurt Warner	QB	St. Louis
2000	Marshall Faulk	RB	St. Louis
2001	Marshall Faulk	RB	St. Louis
2002	Rich Gannon	QB	Oakland
2003	Peyton Manning	QB	Indianapolis
2004	Peyton Manning	QB	Indianapolis
2005	Shaun Alexander	RB	Seattle
2006	LaDainian Tomlinson	RB	San Diego
2007	Tom Brady	QB	New England

=== 2008–2025 ===
Season	Offensive			Defensive		
Season	Player	Position	Team	Player	Position	Team
2008	Drew Brees	QB	New Orleans	Albert Haynesworth	DT	Tennessee
2009	Drew Brees	QB	New Orleans	Charles Woodson	CB	Green Bay
2010	Tom Brady	QB	New England	Clay Matthews	OLB	Green Bay
2011	Aaron Rodgers	QB	Green Bay	Jared Allen	DE	Minnesota
2012	Adrian Peterson	RB	Minnesota	J. J. Watt	DE	Houston
2013	Peyton Manning	QB	Denver	Luke Kuechly	OLB	Carolina
2014	Aaron Rodgers	QB	Green Bay	J. J. Watt	DE	Houston
2015	Cam Newton	QB	Carolina	J. J. Watt	DE	Houston
2016	Tom Brady	QB	New England	Khalil Mack	DE	Oakland
2017	Antonio Brown	WR	Pittsburgh	Calais Campbell	DE	Jacksonville
2018	Patrick Mahomes	QB	Kansas City	Aaron Donald	DT	LA Rams
2019	Lamar Jackson	QB	Baltimore	Stephon Gilmore	CB	New England
2020	Patrick Mahomes	QB	Kansas City	Aaron Donald	DT	LA Rams
2021	Jonathan Taylor	RB	Pittsburgh	T. J. Watt	OLB	Pittsburgh
2022	Justin Jefferson	WR	Minnesota	Nick Bosa	DE	San Francisco
2023	Tyreek Hill	WR	Miami	Myles Garrett	DE	Cleveland
2024	Saquon Barkley	RB	Philadelphia	Myles Garrett	DE	Cleveland
2025	Jaxon Smith-Njigba	WR	Seattle	Myles Garrett	DE	Cleveland

== See also ==
- NFL Most Valuable Player Award
- NFL Offensive Player of the Year Award
- NFL Defensive Player of the Year Award
- List of NFL awards
