= NFL Top 100 Players of 2023 =

NFL Players list

- Season 2023
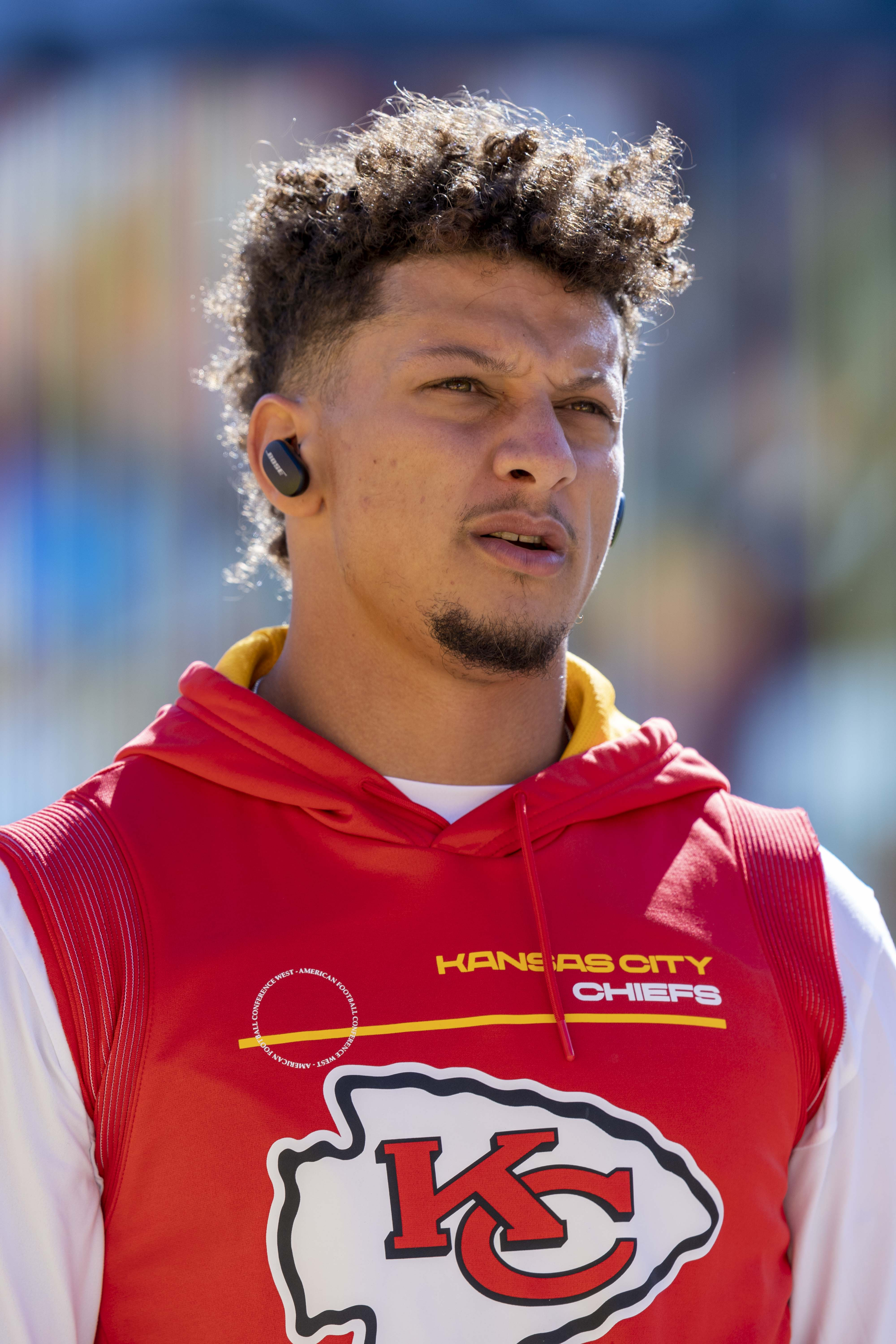
- Patrick Mahomes, the number 1 ranked player

Release
- Original network: NFL Network
- Original release: July 24 – August 7, 2023

Season chronology
- ← Previous; 2022 Next → 2024

The NFL Top 100 Players of 2023 is the thirteenth season in the NFL Top 100 series. It premiered on July 24, 2023, and concluded on August 7, 2023. Kansas City Chiefs quarterback Patrick Mahomes was the number one player for the second time.

== Episode list ==
Episode No.	Air date	Numbers revealed
1	July 24	100–91
2	July 25	90–81
3	July 26	80–71
4	July 27	70–61
5	July 28	60–51
6	July 31	50–41
7	August 1	40–31
8	August 2	30–21
9	August 3	20–11
10	August 7	10–1

== The list ==
Rank	Player	Position	2022 team	2023 team	Rank change from 2022	Reference	Year accomplishments
1	Patrick Mahomes	Quarterback	Kansas City Chiefs		▲7		Super Bowl champion; Super Bowl MVP; NFL MVP; 5,250 passing yards (league leader); 41 passing touchdowns (league leader); 1st-Team All-Pro; Selected to 5th Pro Bowl
2	Justin Jefferson	Wide receiver	Minnesota Vikings		▲15		NFL Offensive Player of the Year; 128 receptions (league leader); 1,809 receiving yards (league leader); 8 receiving touchdowns; 1st-Team All-Pro; Selected to 3rd Pro Bowl
3	Jalen Hurts	Quarterback	Philadelphia Eagles		NR		3,701 passing yards; 22 passing touchdowns; 760 rushing yards; 13 rushing touchdowns; 2nd-Team All-Pro; Selected to 1st Pro Bowl
4	Nick Bosa	Defensive end	San Francisco 49ers		▲21		NFL Defensive Player of the Year; 41 solo tackles; 18.5 sacks (league leader); 1 pass defended; 2 forced fumbles; 1st-Team All-Pro; Selected to 3rd Pro Bowl
5	Travis Kelce	Tight end	Kansas City Chiefs		▲5		Super Bowl champion; 110 receptions; 1,338 receiving yards; 12 receiving touchdowns; 1st-Team All-Pro; Selected to 8th Pro Bowl
6	Joe Burrow	Quarterback	Cincinnati Bengals		▲15		4,475 passing yards; 35 passing touchdowns; 5 rushing touchdowns; Selected to 1st Pro Bowl
7	Tyreek Hill	Wide receiver	Miami Dolphins		▲8		119 receptions; 1,710 receiving yards; 7 receiving touchdowns; 1st-Team All-Pro; Selected to 7th Pro Bowl
8	Josh Allen	Quarterback	Buffalo Bills		▲5		4,283 passing yards; 35 passing touchdowns; 762 rushing yards; 7 rushing touchdowns; Selected to 2nd Pro Bowl
9	Micah Parsons	Outside linebacker	Dallas Cowboys		▲7		42 solo tackles; 13.5 sacks; 3 passes defended; 3 forced fumbles; 1 fumble return touchdown; 1st-Team All-Pro; Selected to 2nd Pro Bowl
10	Chris Jones	Defensive tackle	Kansas City Chiefs		▲29		Super Bowl champion; 30 solo tackles; 15.5 sacks; 4 passes defended; 2 forced fumbles; 1st-Team All-Pro; Selected to 4th Pro Bowl
11	Aaron Donald	Defensive tackle	Los Angeles Rams		▼9		27 solo tackles; 5 sacks; 2 passes defended; 1 forced fumble; 1 fumble recovery; Selected to 9th Pro Bowl
12	Josh Jacobs	Running back	Las Vegas Raiders		NR		1,653 yards rushing (league leader); 12 rushing TDs; 1st-Team All-Pro; Selected to 2nd Pro Bowl
13	Davante Adams	Wide receiver	Las Vegas Raiders		▼6		100 receptions; 1,516 yards receiving; 14 TD receptions (league leader); 1st-Team All-Pro; Selected to 6th Pro Bowl
14	Trent Williams	Offensive tackle	San Francisco 49ers		0		1st-Team All-Pro; Selected to 10th Pro Bowl
15	Fred Warner	Middle linebacker	San Francisco 49ers		▲32		79 solo tackles; 2 sacks; 1 Interception; 10 passes defended; 1 forced fumble; 1st-Team All-Pro; Selected to 2nd Pro Bowl
16	Stefon Diggs	Wide receiver	Buffalo Bills		▲10		108 receptions; 1,429 yards receiving; 11 TD receptions; 2nd-Team All-Pro; Selected to 3rd Pro Bowl
17	Maxx Crosby	Defensive end	Las Vegas Raiders		▲42		58 solo tackles; 12.5 sacks; 4 passes defended; 3 forced fumble; 1 fumble recovery; Selected to 2nd Pro Bowl
18	Minkah Fitzpatrick	Free safety	Pittsburgh Steelers		NR		56 solo tackles; 6 interceptions (league co-leader); 11 passes defended; 1st-Team All-Pro; Selected to 3rd Pro Bowl
19	George Kittle	Tight end	San Francisco 49ers		▲3		60 receptions; 765 yards receiving; 11 TD receptions; 2nd-Team All-Pro; Selected to 4th Pro Bowl
20	Myles Garrett	Defensive end	Cleveland Browns		▼9		37 solo tackles; 16 sacks; 4 passes defended; 2 forced fumbles; 1st-Team All-Pro; Selected to 4th Pro Bowl
21	Austin Ekeler	Running back	Los Angeles Chargers		▲25		915 yards rushing; 13 rushing TDs
22	A. J. Brown	Wide receiver	Philadelphia Eagles		NR		88 receptions; 1,496 yards receiving; 11 TD receptions; 2nd-Team All-Pro; Selected to 2nd Pro Bowl
23	Sauce Gardner	Cornerback	New York Jets		NR		51 solo tackles; 2 interceptions; 20 passes defended (league leader); 1st-Team All-Pro; Selected to 1st Pro Bowl; NFL Defensive Rookie of the Year
24	Roquan Smith	Inside linebacker	Chicago Bears / Baltimore Ravens	Baltimore Ravens	▲60		103 solo tackles; 4.5 sacks; 1 Interception; 3 passes defended; 1st-Team All-Pro; Selected to 1st Pro Bowl
25	Derrick Henry	Running back	Tennessee Titans		▼13		1,538 yards rushing; 13 rushing TDs; Selected to 3rd Pro Bowl
26	Jaire Alexander	Cornerback	Green Bay Packers		NR		53 solo tackles; 5 Interceptions; 14 passes defended; 2nd-Team All-Pro; Selected to 2nd Pro Bowl
27	T. J. Watt	Linebacker	Pittsburgh Steelers		▼21		27 solo tackles; 5.5 sacks; 2 interceptions; 5 passes defended; 1 forced fumble; Selected to 5th Pro Bowl
28	Dexter Lawrence	Defensive tackle	New York Giants		NR		35 solo tackles; 7.5 sacks; 3 passes defended; 2 forced fumbles; 2nd-Team All-Pro; Selected to 1st Pro Bowl
29	Nick Chubb	Running back	Cleveland Browns		▲4		1,525 yards rushing; 12 rushing TDs; 2nd-Team All-Pro; Selected to 4th Pro Bowl
30	Derwin James	Strong safety	Los Angeles Chargers		▲13		64 solo tackles; 4 sacks; 2 interceptions; 6 passes defended; 2 forced fumbles; 2nd-Team All-Pro; Selected to 3rd Pro Bowl
31	Saquon Barkley	Running back	New York Giants		NR		1,312 yards rushing; 10 rushing TDs; Selected to 2nd Pro Bowl
32	Justin Herbert	Quarterback	Los Angeles Chargers		▲8		4,739 yards passing; 25 TD passes
33	Matthew Judon	Linebacker	New England Patriots		▲19		36 solo tackles; 15.5 sacks; 3 passes defended; 2 forced fumbles; 1 fumble recovery; Selected to 4th Pro Bowl
34	CeeDee Lamb	Wide receiver	Dallas Cowboys		▲61		107 receptions; 1,359 yards receiving; 9 TD receptions; 2nd-Team All-Pro; Selected to 2nd Pro Bowl
35	Christian McCaffrey	Running back	Carolina Panthers / San Francisco 49ers	San Francisco 49ers	NR		1,139 yards rushing; 8 rushing TDs; Selected to 2nd Pro Bowl
36	Jalen Ramsey	Cornerback	Los Angeles Rams	Miami Dolphins	▼27		64 solo tackles; 2 sacks; 4 Interceptions; 18 passes defended; 2 forced fumbles; 1 fumble recovery; Selected to 6th Pro Bowl
37	Jason Kelce	Center	Philadelphia Eagles		▲34		1st-Team All-Pro; Selected to 6th Pro Bowl
38	Khalil Mack	Outside linebacker	Los Angeles Chargers		NR		33 solo tackles; 8 sacks; 2 passes defended; 2 forced fumbles; 2 fumble recoveries; Selected to 7th Pro Bowl
39	Ja'Marr Chase	Wide receiver	Cincinnati Bengals		▼15		87 receptions; 1,046 yards receiving; 9 TD receptions; Selected to 2nd Pro Bowl
40	Quinnen Williams	Defensive tackle	New York Jets		NR		35 solo tackles; 12 sacks; 4 passes defended; 2 forced fumbles; 1 fumble recovery; 1st-Team All-Pro; Selected to 1st Pro Bowl
41	Lane Johnson	Offensive tackle	Philadelphia Eagles		NR		1st-Team All-Pro; Selected to 4th Pro Bowl
42	Kirk Cousins	Quarterback	Minnesota Vikings		▲57		4,547 yards passing; 29 TD passes; Selected to 4th Pro Bowl
43	Demario Davis	Inside linebacker	New Orleans Saints		▲31		54 solo tackles; 6 1/2 sacks; 1 Interception; 6 passes defended; 1 fumble recovery; 2nd-Team All-Pro; Selected to 1st Pro Bowl
44	Jaylen Waddle	Wide receiver	Miami Dolphins		▲19		75 receptions; 1,356 yards receiving; 8 TD receptions
45	Cameron Heyward	Defensive tackle	Pittsburgh Steelers		▼3		39 solo tackles; 10 1/2 sacks; 1 forced fumble; 1 fumble recovery; 4 passes defended; Selected to 6th Pro Bowl
46	C. J. Mosley	Linebacker	New York Jets		NR		99 solo tackles; 1 sack; 1 Interception; 7 passes defended; 1 fumble recovery; 2nd-Team All-Pro; Selected to 5th Pro Bowl
47	Cooper Kupp	Wide receiver	Los Angeles Rams		▼43		75 receptions; 812 yards receiving; 6 TD receptions
48	Haason Reddick	Outside linebacker	Philadelphia Eagles		NR		35 solo tackles; 16 sacks; 3 passes defended; 5 forced fumbles (league co-leader); 3 fumble recoveries; 2nd-Team All-Pro; Selected to 1st Pro Bowl
49	Patrick Surtain II	Cornerback	Denver Broncos		NR		46 solo tackles; 10 passes defended; 2 Interceptions; 1 Forced Fumble; 1st-Team-All Pro; Selected to 1st Pro Bowl
50	Cameron Jordan	Defensive end	New Orleans Saints		▲19		40 solo tackles; 8 1/2 sacks; 2 passes defended; 2 forced fumbles; Selected to 8th Pro Bowl
51	Aaron Rodgers	Quarterback	Green Bay Packers	New York Jets	▼48		3,695 yards passing; 26 TD passes
52	Jonathan Allen	Defensive tackle	Washington Commanders		▲36		44 solo tackles; 7 1/2 sacks; 2 forced fumbles; 3 passes defended; 1 Interception; Selected to 2nd Pro Bowl
53	Mike Evans	Wide receiver	Tampa Bay Buccaneers		0		77 receptions; 1,124 yards receiving; 6 TD receptions
54	Brian Burns	Outside linebacker	Carolina Panthers		▲22		34 solo tackles; 12 1/2 sacks; 3 passes defended; 1 forced fumble; Selected to 2nd Pro Bowl
55	Tony Pollard	Running back	Dallas Cowboys		NR		1,007 yards rushing; 9 rushing TDs; Selected to 1st Pro Bowl
56	Dak Prescott	Quarterback	Dallas Cowboys		▼12		2,860 yards passing; 23 TD passes; Walter Payton NFL Man of the Year
57	Jordan Poyer	Strong safety	Buffalo Bills		▼12		36 solo tackles; 8 passes defended; 4 Interceptions; Selected to 1st Pro Bowl
58	Jeffery Simmons	Defensive tackle	Tennessee Titans		▼4		25 solo tackles; 7 1/2 sacks; 1 forced fumble; 7 passes defended; 2nd-Team All-Pro; Selected to 2nd Pro Bowl
59	Justin Simmons	Free safety	Denver Broncos		▲22		42 solo tackles; 3 forced fumbles; 1 fumble recovery; 6 Interceptions (league co-leader); 2nd-Team All-Pro
60	Trevon Diggs	Cornerback	Dallas Cowboys		▼37		50 solo tackles; 3 Interceptions; 1 fumble recovery; Selected to 2nd Pro Bowl
61	Deebo Samuel	Wide receiver	San Francisco 49ers		▼42		56 receptions; 632 yards receiving; 2 TD receptions
62	Bobby Wagner	Middle linebacker	Los Angeles Rams	Seattle Seahawks	▼33		81 solo tackles; 6 sacks; 5 passes defended; 2 Interceptions; 2nd-Team All-Pro
63	Grady Jarrett	Defensive end	Atlanta Falcons		NR		30 solo tackles; 6 sacks
64	Aaron Jones	Running back	Green Bay Packers		NR		1,121 yards rushing; 2 rushing TDs
65	Darius Slay	Cornerback	Philadelphia Eagles		▲12		40 solo tackles; 14 passes defended; 3 Interceptions; Selected to 5th Pro Bowl
66	Jared Goff	Quarterback	Detroit Lions		NR		4,438 yards passing; 29 TD passes; Selected to 3rd Pro Bowl
67	Amon-Ra St. Brown	Wide receiver	Detroit Lions		NR		106 receptions; 1,161 yards receiving; 6 TD receptions; Selected to 1st Pro Bowl
68	Zack Martin	Guard	Dallas Cowboys		0		1st-Team All-Pro; Selected to 8th Pro Bowl
69	Matt Milano	Linebacker	Buffalo Bills		NR		72 solo tackles; 1 1/2 sacks; 3 Interceptions, including 1 for TD; 11 passes defended; 2 fumble recoveries; 1st-Team All-Pro; Selected to 1st Pro Bowl
70	Joey Bosa	Outside linebacker	Los Angeles Chargers		▼40		8 solo tackles; 2 1/2 sacks; 1 fumble recovery
71	DeForest Buckner	Defensive tackle	Indianapolis Colts		▼5		44 solo tackles; 8 sacks; 2 forced fumbles; 1 fumble recovery; 3 passes defended
72	Lamar Jackson	Quarterback	Baltimore Ravens		▼36		2,242 yards passing; 17 TD passes
73	Budda Baker	Safety	Arizona Cardinals		▼6		75 solo tackles; 7 passes defended; 2 Interceptions; 1 forced fumble; Selected to 5th Pro Bowl
74	Garrett Wilson	Wide receiver	New York Jets		NR		83 receptions; 1,103 yards receiving; 4 TD receptions; PFWA All-Rookie Team; NFL Offensive Rookie of the Year
75	Trey Hendrickson	Defensive end	Cincinnati Bengals		▲3		22 solo tackles; 8 sacks; 3 passes defended; 3 forced fumbles; Selected to 2nd Pro Bowl
76	Tariq Woolen	Cornerback	Seattle Seahawks		NR		46 solo tackles; 1 tackle for loss; 6 Interceptions, including 1 for TD (league co-leader); 3 fumble recoveries; Selected to 1st Pro Bowl; PFWA All-Rookie Team
77	Geno Smith	Quarterback	Seattle Seahawks		NR		4,282 yards passing; 30 TD passes; NFL completion percentage leader (69.8%); Selected to 1st Pro Bowl; NFL Comeback Player of the Year
78	Talanoa Hufanga	Safety	San Francisco 49ers		NR		66 solo tackles; 5 tackles for loss; 2 sacks; 9 passes defended; 4 Interceptions (including 1 for TD); 2 forced fumbles; 1st-Team All-Pro; Selected to 1st Pro Bowl
79	Dre Greenlaw	Outside linebacker	San Francisco 49ers		NR		82 solo tackles; 6 passes defended; 1 Interception; 2 forced fumbles; 2 fumble recoveries (including 1 for TD)
80	Mark Andrews	Tight end	Baltimore Ravens		▼48		73 receptions; 847 yards receiving; 5 TD receptions; Selected to 3rd Pro Bowl
81	Christian Wilkins	Defensive tackle	Miami Dolphins		NR		43 solo tackles; 3 1/2 sacks; 6 passes defended
82	Tua Tagovailoa	Quarterback	Miami Dolphins		NR		3,548 yards passing; 25 TD passes; NFL passer rating leader (105.5)
83	Terron Armstead	Offensive tackle	Miami Dolphins		NR		Selected to 4th Pro Bowl
84	Za'Darius Smith	Defensive end	Minnesota Vikings	Cleveland Browns	NR		32 Solo tackles; 10 sacks; 5 passes defended; 1 forced fumble; Selected to 3rd Pro Bowl
85	Laremy Tunsil	Offensive tackle	Houston Texans		NR		Selected to 3rd Pro Bowl
86	Justin Fields	Quarterback	Chicago Bears		NR		2,242 yards passing; 17 TD passes
87	Chris Lindstrom	Guard	Atlanta Falcons		NR		2nd-Team All-Pro; Selected to 1st Pro Bowl
88	Aidan Hutchinson	Defensive end	Detroit Lions		NR		34 solo tackles; 9 1/2 sacks; 3 Interceptions; 3 passes defended; 2 fumble recoveries; PFWA All-Rookie Team
89	Marshon Lattimore	Cornerback	New Orleans Saints		0		20 solo tackles; 4 passes defended; 1 Interception returned for TD
90	DeAndre Hopkins	Wide receiver	Arizona Cardinals	Tennessee Titans	▼53		64 receptions; 717 yards receiving; 3 TD receptions
91	Dalvin Cook	Running back	Minnesota Vikings	New York Jets/Baltimore Ravens	▼60		1,173 yards rushing; 8 rushing TDs; Selected to 4th Pro Bowl
92	Marlon Humphrey	Cornerback	Baltimore Ravens		NR		53 solo tackles; 7 passes defended; 3 Interceptions; 1 Forced Fumble; 2 Fumble Recoveries; Selected to 3rd Pro Bowl
93	Eric Kendricks	Middle linebacker	Minnesota Vikings	Los Angeles Chargers	NR		87 solo tackles; 1 sack; 6 passes defended; 1 fumble recovery
94	Terry McLaurin	Wide receiver	Washington Commanders		NR		77 receptions; 1,191 yards receiving; 5 TD receptions; Selected to 1st Pro Bowl
95	Jamaal Williams	Running back	Detroit Lions	New Orleans Saints	NR		1,066 yards rushing; 17 rushing TDs (league leader)
96	Trevor Lawrence	Quarterback	Jacksonville Jaguars		NR		4,113 yards passing; 25 touchdown passes; 1st Pro Bowl selection
97	Harrison Smith	Safety	Minnesota Vikings		NR		66 solo tackles; 10 passes defended; 5 Interceptions; 1 Forced fumble
98	Tristan Wirfs	Offensive tackle	Tampa Bay Buccaneers		▼57		2nd Team All-Pro selection; Selected to 2nd Pro Bowl
99	DeMarcus Lawrence	Defensive end	Dallas Cowboys		NR		43 solo tackles; 6 sacks; 3 passes defended; 3 forced fumbles; 2 fumbles recovered; Selected to 3rd career Pro Bowl
100	DeVonta Smith	Wide receiver	Philadelphia Eagles		NR		95 receptions; 1,196 yards receiving; 7 TD receptions
