= List of NFL Offensive Player of the Year awards =

The National Football League Offensive Player of the Year Award is an annual American football award given by various organizations to the National Football League (NFL) player who is considered the top offensive player during the regular season. Organizations which issue the award include the Associated Press (AP), Pro Football Writers of America (PFWA) and Sporting News. The AP's award is recognized at the annual NFL Honors ceremony.

== Winners ==
Season	Associated Press	PFWA	Sporting News
1972	Larry Brown	—	—
1973	O. J. Simpson	—	—
1974	Ken Stabler	—	—
1975	Fran Tarkenton	—	—
1976	Bert Jones	—	—
1977	Walter Payton	—	—
1978	Earl Campbell	—	—
1979	Earl Campbell	—	—
1980	Earl Campbell	—	—
1981	Ken Anderson	—	—
1982	Dan Fouts	—	—
1983	Joe Theismann	—	—
1984	Dan Marino	—	—
1985	Marcus Allen	—	—
1986	Eric Dickerson	—	—
1987	Jerry Rice	—	—
1988	Roger Craig	—	—
1989	Joe Montana	—	—
1990	Warren Moon	—	—
1991	Thurman Thomas	—	—
1992	Steve Young	Steve Young	—
1993	Jerry Rice	Emmitt Smith	—
1994	Barry Sanders	Steve Young	—
1995	Brett Favre	Brett Favre	—
1996	Terrell Davis	Brett Favre	—
1997	Barry Sanders	Barry Sanders	—
1998	Terrell Davis	Barry Sanders	—
1999	Marshall Faulk	Kurt Warner	—
2000	Marshall Faulk	Marshall Faulk	—
2001	Marshall Faulk	Marshall Faulk	—
2002	Priest Holmes	Rich Gannon	—
2003	Jamal Lewis	Jamal Lewis	—
2004	Peyton Manning	Peyton Manning	—
2005	Shaun Alexander	Shaun Alexander	—
2006	LaDainian Tomlinson	LaDainian Tomlinson	—
2007	Tom Brady	Tom Brady	—
2008	Drew Brees	Peyton Manning	Drew Brees
2009	Chris Johnson	Peyton Manning	Drew Brees
2010	Tom Brady	Tom Brady	Tom Brady
2011	Drew Brees	Aaron Rodgers	Aaron Rodgers
2012	Adrian Peterson	Adrian Peterson	Adrian Peterson
2013	Peyton Manning	Peyton Manning	Peyton Manning
2014	DeMarco Murray	DeMarco Murray	Aaron Rodgers
2015	Cam Newton	Cam Newton	Cam Newton
2016	Matt Ryan	Matt Ryan	Tom Brady
2017	Todd Gurley	Todd Gurley	Antonio Brown
2018	Patrick Mahomes	Patrick Mahomes	Patrick Mahomes
2019	Michael Thomas	Lamar Jackson	Lamar Jackson
2020	Derrick Henry	Derrick Henry	Patrick Mahomes
2021	Cooper Kupp	Cooper Kupp	Jonathan Taylor
2022	Justin Jefferson	Justin Jefferson	Justin Jefferson
2023	Christian McCaffrey	Christian McCaffrey	Tyreek Hill
2024	Saquon Barkley	Saquon Barkley	Saquon Barkley
2025	Jaxon Smith-Njigba	Jaxon Smith-Njigba	Jaxon Smith-Njigba

== See also ==
- List of NFL awards
