= 40-yard dash =

Speed test in American football

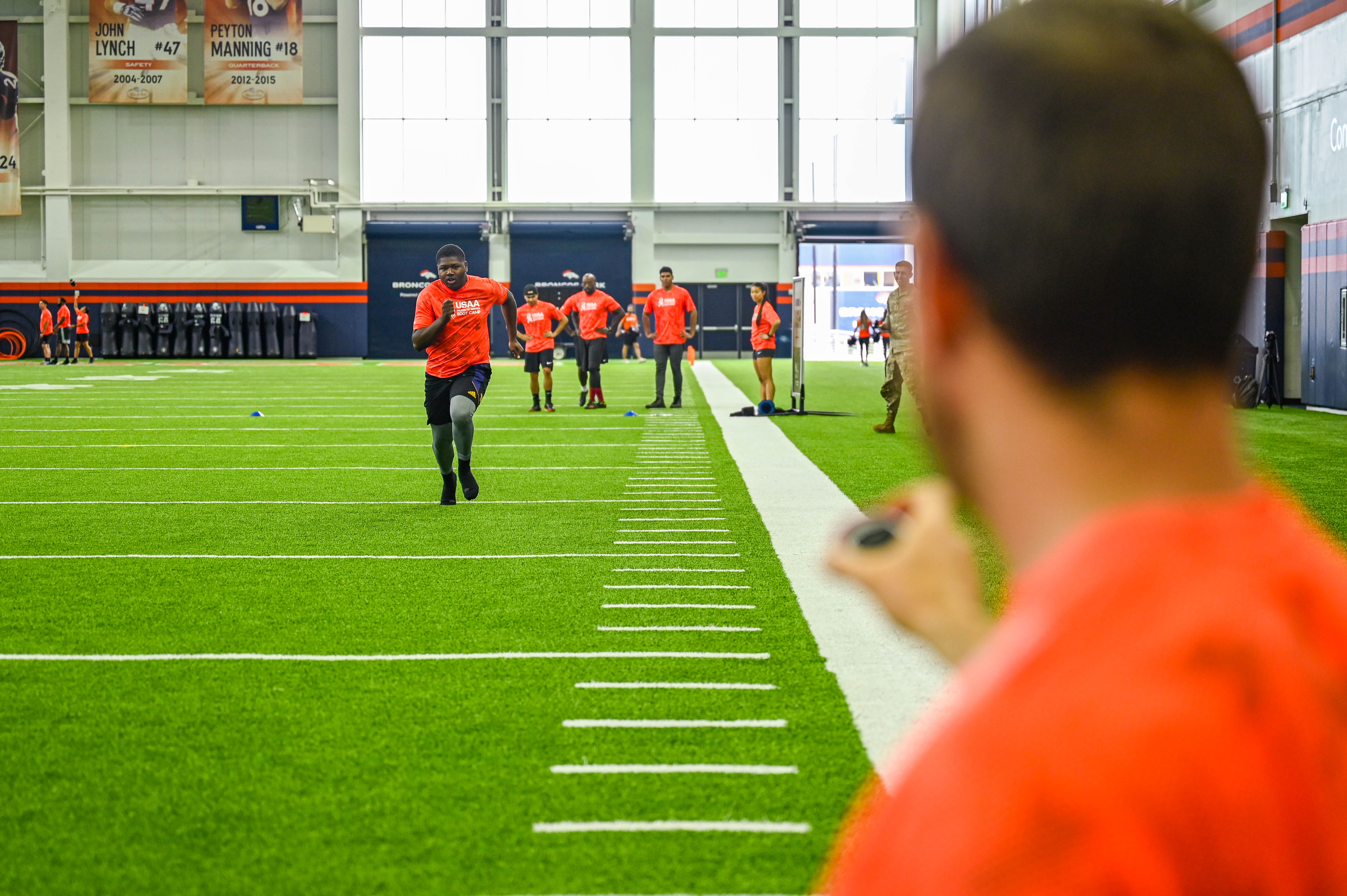
A United States airman running a 40-yard dash

The 40-yard dash is a sprint covering 40 yards (36.576 m). It is primarily run to evaluate the speed and acceleration of American football players by scouts, particularly for the NFL draft but also for collegiate recruiting. A football player's recorded time can have a heavy impact on his prospects in college or professional football. This was traditionally only true for the skill positions such as running back, wide receiver, and defensive back, although now a fast 40-yard dash time is considered important for almost every position. The 40-yard dash is not a currently-run race in track and field athletics, and is not a World Athletics–recognized race.

The origin of timing football players for 40 yards comes from the average distance of a punt and the time it takes to reach that distance. Punts average around 40 yards in distance from the line of scrimmage, and the hangtime (time of flight) averages approximately 4.5 seconds; therefore, if a player can run 40 yards in 4.5 seconds, he will be able to leave the line of scrimmage when a punt is kicked, and reach the point where the ball comes down just as it arrives.

== Timing method and track comparisons ==
In terms of judging a person's speed, the best method of timing is through lasers which start and stop the times when passed through. A laser start (from a stationary position) is more accurate for measuring pure speed as it does not register a runner's reaction time, however, this method of timing a 40-yard dash can affect the accuracy by as much as 0.5 seconds with the manual stopwatch method.

The National Football League (NFL) did not begin using partial electronic timing (i.e. started by hand, stopped electronically) at the NFL Scouting Combine until 1999. For purposes of measurement at the Combine, the run is made along the sideline from the front of the end zone to the 40-yard line, and for electronically timed 40-yard dashes, the runner is allowed to start when they wish, and a timer hand-starts the clock.

In contrast, track and field races have the runner react to a starting gun. Elite male sprinters typically take 0.15 to 0.2 seconds (based on FAT timing) to react; further to this, IAAF rules state any runner with a reaction time of less than 0.1 second is subject to disqualification.

This aspect means that comparisons with track times are essentially impossible given that a reaction time is not factored in, and the use of hand-timing in the 40-yard dash can considerably alter a runner's time: the methods are not comparable to the rigorous electronic timing used in track and field.

For example, Jacoby Ford, who ran 4.28 seconds in the 2010 NFL Combine, had a collegiate best of 6.51 s in the 60-meter dash (outside the top-00 of the all-time lists).

Though not a current event, the 40-yard dash was briefly contested at the USA Indoor Track and Field Championships for women in 1927, 1928, 1929, 1930, 1931, and 1932. It was never staged as a men's event. The fastest winning time, including reaction, was 5.2 (originally recorded as 5 1/5) seconds, first set by Rosa Grosse and later tied by Mary Carew twice.

== Records ==
In most settings, the 40-yard dash is conducted without fully automatic timing, where lasers are used at both the beginning and end of the race. Instead, the 40-yard dash is most often hand-timed, leading to considerable measurement error. Many (in particular older) reports of times below 4.2 or 4.3 are considered suspect, such as Baylor's Gerald McNeil's 4.19-second 40-yard dash in the 1980s before being signed to the United States Football League (USFL), or Deion Sanders's 4.27-second 40-yard dash in 1989. More recent examples include rugby union's Carlin Isles time of 4.22 at a Detroit Lions facility during a 2013 workout, and Texas Tech's Jakeem Grant being hand-timed by a New Orleans Saints scout at 4.1 in 2016.

Also unofficially, Bo Jackson, who was invited to the 1986 combine and declined, ran the 40 to show off for scouts at Auburn. Electronically, with a laser, he has said it measured 4.12, and by hand it was 4.16. "I got down there, and I took off and ran completely through. I just kept going right out the door and didn't come back." he was quoted after.

In 2017, Olympic sprinter Christian Coleman ran a time of 4.12 seconds on turf in response to claims that NFL players are as fast as Usain Bolt. In 2024, University of Iowa sprinter Kalen Walker ran a 4.15 on turf during the halftime of a Hawkeyes football game. A year and a half after he retired from active competition, Usain Bolt ran a 4.22 in flat-soled shoes and a tracksuit at a promotional event for the Super Bowl in Atlanta, Georgia on February 2, 2019.

=== NFL Scouting Combine ===
This is a list of the official 40-yard dash results of under 4.31 seconds recorded at the NFL Scouting combine since 1999, the first year electronic timing was implemented at the NFL Scouting Combine.

Time	Name	Height	Weight	Position	College	Year	Draft	R
4.21	Xavier Worthy	5 ft 11 in (1.80 m)	165 lb (74.8 kg; 11.8 st)	Wide receiver	Texas	2024	No. 28 overall by Kansas City Chiefs	
4.22	John Ross	5 ft 11 in (1.80 m)	190 lb (86.2 kg; 13.6 st)	Wide receiver	Washington	2017	No. 9 overall by Cincinnati Bengals	
4.23	Kalon Barnes	5 ft 11 in (1.80 m)	183 lb (83.0 kg; 13.1 st)	Cornerback	Baylor	2022	No. 242 overall by Carolina Panthers	
4.24	Chris Johnson	5 ft 11 in (1.80 m)	192 lb (87.1 kg; 13.7 st)	Running back	East Carolina	2008	No. 24 overall by Tennessee Titans	
4.24	Rondel Menendez	5 ft 9 in (1.75 m)	192 lb (87.1 kg; 13.7 st)	Wide receiver	Eastern Kentucky	1999	No. 247 overall by Atlanta Falcons	
4.26	Dri Archer	5 ft 8 in (1.73 m)	173 lb (78.5 kg; 12.4 st)	Running back	Kent State	2014	No. 97 overall by Pittsburgh Steelers	
4.26	Jerome Mathis	5 ft 11 in (1.80 m)	184 lb (83.5 kg; 13.1 st)	Wide receiver	Hampton	2005	No. 114 overall by Houston Texans	
4.26	D. J. Turner	5 ft 11 in (1.80 m)	178 lb (80.7 kg; 12.7 st)	Cornerback	Michigan	2023	No. 60 overall by Cincinnati Bengals	
4.26	Tariq Woolen	6 ft 4 in (1.93 m)	205 lb (93.0 kg; 14.6 st)	Cornerback	UTSA	2022	No. 153 overall by Seattle Seahawks	
4.26	Brenen Thompson	5 ft 9 in (1.75 m)	164 lb (74.4 kg; 11.7 st)	Wide receiver	Mississippi State	2026	No. 105 overall by Los Angeles Chargers	
4.27	Marquise Goodwin	5 ft 10 in (1.78 m)	181 lb (82.1 kg; 12.9 st)	Wide receiver	Texas	2013	No. 78 overall by Buffalo Bills	
4.27	Stanford Routt	6 ft 2 in (1.88 m)	193 lb (87.5 kg; 13.8 st)	Cornerback	Houston	2005	No. 38 overall by Oakland Raiders	
4.27	Henry Ruggs III	6 ft 0 in (1.83 m)	190 lb (86.2 kg; 13.6 st)	Wide receiver	Alabama	2020	No. 12 overall by Las Vegas Raiders	
4.27	Lorenzo Styles Jr.	6 ft 0 in (1.83 m)	194 lb (88.0 kg; 13.9 st)	Cornerback	Ohio State	2026	No. 172 overall by New Orleans Saints	
4.28	Champ Bailey	6 ft 0 in (1.83 m)	192 lb (87.1 kg; 13.7 st)	Cornerback	Georgia	1999	No. 7 overall by Washington Redskins	
4.28	Jacoby Ford	5 ft 9 in (1.75 m)	190 lb (86.2 kg; 13.6 st)	Wide receiver	Clemson	2010	No. 108 overall by Oakland Raiders	
4.28	Maxwell Hairston	6 ft 1 in (1.85 m)	170 lb (77.1 kg; 12.1 st)	Cornerback	Kentucky	2025	No. 30 overall by Buffalo Bills	
4.28	Jalen Myrick	5 ft 10 in (1.78 m)	200 lb (90.7 kg; 14.3 st)	Cornerback	Minnesota	2017	No. 222 overall by Jacksonville Jaguars	
4.28	J. J. Nelson	5 ft 10 in (1.78 m)	156 lb (70.8 kg; 11.1 st)	Wide receiver	UAB	2015	No. 159 overall by Arizona Cardinals	
4.28	Tyquan Thornton	6 ft 2 in (1.88 m)	181 lb (82.1 kg; 12.9 st)	Wide receiver	Baylor	2022	No. 50 overall by New England Patriots	
4.28	DeMarcus Van Dyke	6 ft 1 in (1.85 m)	187 lb (84.8 kg; 13.4 st)	Cornerback	Miami	2011	No. 81 overall by Oakland Raiders	
4.28	Nate Wiggins	6 ft 1 in (1.85 m)	173 lb (78.5 kg; 12.4 st)	Cornerback	Clemson	2024	No. 30 overall by Baltimore Ravens	
4.29	Matthew Golden	5 ft 11 in (1.80 m)	191 lb (86.6 kg; 13.6 st)	Wide receiver	Texas	2025	No. 23 overall by Green Bay Packers	
4.29	Javelin Guidry	5 ft 9 in (1.75 m)	191 lb (86.6 kg; 13.6 st)	Cornerback	Utah	2020	—N/a	
4.29	Fabian Washington	5 ft 11 in (1.80 m)	188 lb (85.3 kg; 13.4 st)	Cornerback	Nebraska	2005	No. 23 overall by Oakland Raiders	
4.29	Zedrick Woods	5 ft 11 in (1.80 m)	205 lb (93.0 kg; 14.6 st)	Safety	Mississippi	2019	—N/a	
4.30	Jakorian Bennett	5 ft 11 in (1.80 m)	188 lb (85.3 kg; 13.4 st)	Cornerback	Maryland	2023	No. 104 overall by Las Vegas Raiders	
4.30	Deion Burks	5 ft 9 in (1.75 m)	188 lb (85.3 kg; 13.4 st)	Wide receiver	Oklahoma	2026	No. 254 overall by Indianapolis Colts	
4.30	Jamel Dean	6 ft 1 in (1.85 m)	206 lb (93.4 kg; 14.7 st)	Cornerback	Auburn	2019	No. 94 overall by Tampa Bay Buccaneers	
4.30	Yamon Figurs	5 ft 11 in (1.80 m)	174 lb (78.9 kg; 12.4 st)	Wide receiver	Kansas State	2007	No. 74 overall by Baltimore Ravens	
4.30	Darrius Heyward-Bey	6 ft 2 in (1.88 m)	210 lb (95.3 kg; 15.0 st)	Wide receiver	Maryland	2009	No. 7 overall by Oakland Raiders	
4.30	Tye Hill	5 ft 10 in (1.78 m)	185 lb (83.9 kg; 13.2 st)	Cornerback	Clemson	2006	No. 15 overall by St. Louis Rams	
4.30	Darien Porter	6 ft 3 in (1.91 m)	195 lb (88.5 kg; 13.9 st)	Cornerback	Iowa State	2025	No. 68 overall by Las Vegas Raiders	
4.30	Dont'e Thornton Jr.	6 ft 5 in (1.96 m)	205 lb (93.0 kg; 14.6 st)	Wide receiver	Tennessee	2025	No. 108 overall by Las Vegas Raiders	
4.30	Darrent Williams	5 ft 9 in (1.75 m)	176 lb (79.8 kg; 12.6 st)	Cornerback	Oklahoma State	2005	No. 56 overall by Denver Broncos	

== Average time by position ==
According to a five-year NFL combine report, wide receivers and cornerbacks had the fastest average times at 4.48, followed by running backs at 4.49. The following average times were measured between 2000 and 2012 at the NFL combine for players who played at least 5 games.

Position	Time
Wide receiver	4.48
Cornerback	4.48
Running back	4.49
Free safety	4.53
Strong safety	4.55
Outside linebacker	4.60
Tight end	4.70
Inside linebacker	4.76
Fullback	4.80
Defensive end	4.80
Quarterback	4.93
Defensive tackle	5.06
Center	5.30
Offensive tackle	5.32
Offensive guard	5.37
