= Derrick Henry =

American football player (born 1994)

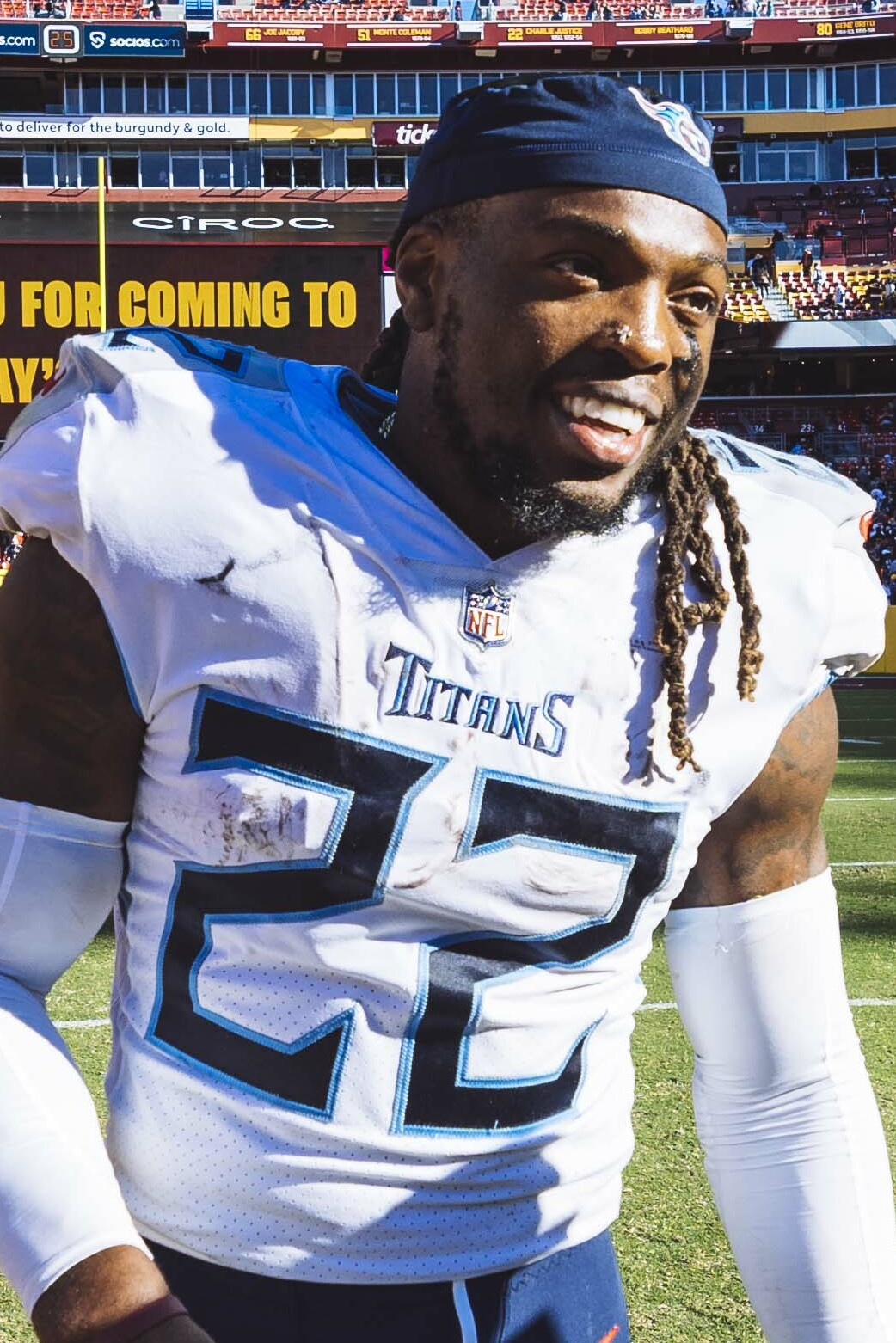
- Henry with the Tennessee Titans in 2022

No. 22 – Baltimore Ravens
- Position: Running back
- Roster status: Active

Personal information
- Born: January 4, 1994 (age 32); Yulee, Florida, U.S.
- Listed height: 6 ft 3 in (1.91 m)
- Listed weight: 252 lb (114 kg)

Career information
- High school: Yulee
- College: Alabama (2013–2015)
- NFL draft: 2016: 2nd round, 45th overall pick

Career history
- Tennessee Titans (2016–2023); Baltimore Ravens (2024–present)

Awards and highlights
- NFL: NFL Offensive Player of the Year (2020); First-team All-Pro (2020); 3× Second-team All-Pro (2019 (Note: Selected as a running back and the flex), 2024); 5× Pro Bowl (2019, 2020, 2022–2024); 2× NFL rushing yards leader (2019, 2020); 3× NFL rushing touchdowns leader (2019 (Note: Tied with Aaron Jones), 2020, 2024 (Note: Tied with James Cook and Jahmyr Gibbs)); NCAA: CFP national champion (2015); Heisman Trophy (2015); Maxwell Award (2015); Walter Camp Award (2015); Doak Walker Award (2015); Unanimous All-American (2015); NCAA rushing yards leader (2015); NCAA rushing touchdowns leader (2015); NCAA scoring leader (2015); NFL records: 99-yard rushing touchdown (Note: Tied with Tony Dorsett); Most career games with 200+ rushing yards: 7; Most seasons with 1,900+ rushing yards: 2; Most seasons with 1,500+ rushing yards: 5 (Note: Tied with Barry Sanders); Most seasons with 12+ rushing touchdowns: 7 (Note: Tied with LaDainian Tomlinson); Most rushing yards in first two seasons with a team: 3,516

Career NFL statistics as of Week 10, 2026
- Rushing yards: 13,717
- Rushing average: 4.8
- Rushing touchdowns: 132
- Receptions: 206
- Receiving yards: 1,886
- Receiving touchdowns: 6
- Stats at Pro Football Reference

Derrick Lamar Henry Jr. (born January 4, 1994) is an American professional football running back for the Baltimore Ravens of the National Football League (NFL). Nicknamed "King Henry", he is known for his imposing style of play and unusually large build for a running back. Noted for his success at every stage of his career, Henry is the only player to have rushed for at least 2,000 yards in a season at the high school, college, and professional levels. He also led the nation in rushing yards and rushing touchdowns at all three levels. Henry is widely considered to be one of the greatest running backs of all time.

Born and raised in Yulee, Florida, Henry set the national high school football record for career rushing yards with the Yulee Hornets, breaking Ken Hall's record that had stood for almost 60 years. Henry was a five star recruit according to ESPN. He played college football for the Alabama Crimson Tide, where during his junior season, Henry broke Herschel Walker's single-season college rushing yards record in the Southeastern Conference (SEC), won the 2015 Heisman Trophy, the Doak Walker Award, the Maxwell Award, and the Walter Camp Award, and was a key part of the 2015 Alabama Crimson Tide football team that won the 2016 College Football Playoff National Championship.

Henry was selected by the Tennessee Titans in the second round of the 2016 NFL draft. A backup for most of his first two seasons in the league, Henry emerged as the Titans' feature back near the end of the 2018 season. He led the NFL in rushing yards for the 2019 season, as well as rushing touchdowns. In 2020, Henry again led the league in both rushing yards and rushing touchdowns, becoming just the eighth player in NFL history—and the second Tennessee Titan after Chris Johnson in 2009—to surpass 2,000 rushing yards in a single season. He went on to win the 2020 AP NFL Offensive Player of the Year Award. After missing more than half of the 2021 season to injury, Henry made his third and fourth Pro Bowl appearances in the subsequent two seasons. After eight seasons in Tennessee, Henry signed with the Baltimore Ravens in 2024, where he set multiple franchise records during his first season with the team.

As of 2026, Henry is the NFL's active leader in career rushing yards and touchdowns (ranking seventh and third all-time, respectively). Henry's success and dominance has also extended into the playoffs. He is the NFL's active leader in postseason rushing yards (ranking seventh all-time), holds several playoffs records, and was a key contributor to Titans' playoff wins in 2017–18 and 2019–20 and the Ravens' playoff win in 2024–25.

== Early life ==
Henry was born on January 4, 1994, in Yulee, Florida, to Stacy Veal and Derrick Henry Sr., aged 15 and 16 respectively. Derrick Sr. was absent for much of Henry's childhood, having been arrested 20 times for various crimes including drug and prostitution-related offenses, and was consequently in and out of prison and had trouble maintaining employment. Stacy became a hemodialysis technician, and Henry was raised primarily by his grandmother, Gladys, who nicknamed him "Shocka", because his birth shocked the whole family, given his parents' young ages. Henry developed a close relationship with Gladys, whom he cites as very influential in his upbringing.

From a young age, Henry showed a natural passion for football. At age two, he would always find a football and run from his aunt in toy stores, as if she was a would-be tackler. Though football was his true passion, Henry excelled in several sports, playing baseball for Yulee Little League, football for Yulee Pop Warner, and youth basketball at the Peck Center through the city of Fernandina Beach. In one Little League game, he hit a ball over the 200-foot fence, sending it over another higher fence into a school bus.

Henry started playing organized football at age six. He was so big and powerful for his age that a copy of his birth certificate was brought to all of his games, and even then, opposing parents skeptically shook their heads. Henry spent the entirety of grade school playing up an age level because he could not make the required weight of his actual age group. His athleticism was also evident in basketball; he was dunking by seventh grade and helped his team win a conference championship that year. As an eighth grader, he averaged more than 30 points per game despite games consisting of six-minute quarters and helped his team win the county championship.

In eighth-grade football, Henry rushed for a then-school-record 1,242 yards and 20 touchdowns despite regularly being removed from games early. He was so dominant that opposing coaches instituted the unofficial "Shocka Henry Rule", under which Yulee would consider pulling him from the game when the Hornets held a three-touchdown lead.

== High school career ==
Henry attended Yulee High School, where he was a three-sport star in football, basketball, and track, although he gave up basketball after his freshman year. Henry played as a running back for the Yulee Hornets football team. As a freshman in 2009, he rushed for 2,465 yards and 26 touchdowns and was named first-team All-First Coast by The Florida Times-Union, as well as the only freshman selected to the All-State team.

In 2010, Henry again earned first-team All-First Coast honors and was named the First Coast Offensive Player of the Year and MaxPreps National Sophomore of the Year after rushing for 2,788 yards and 38 touchdowns while averaging 8.9 yards per attempt, helping Yulee clinch the first state playoff berth in school history. As a junior in 2011, he repeated as a first-team All-First Coast selection and was named Florida's Class 4A Player of the Year after rushing for 2,610 yards and 34 touchdowns.

Henry set the Florida high school record with a 510-yard performance against Jacksonville Jackson (a record he held until 2021). In the regional final against East Gadsden, he rushed for 189 yards and a touchdown and threw a 30-yard touchdown pass, helping Yulee to a 16–13 victory and the Region 1-4A championship. He averaged 9.2 yards per carry and 327.8 yards per game as a senior, finishing the season with a state-record 4,261 yards and 55 touchdowns. He was once more named first-team All-First Coast and earned MaxPreps Athlete of the Year and MaxPreps Player of the Year honors, along with Player of the Year recognition from several other organizations. Henry was also named a MaxPreps and Parade All-American, as well as a member of the USA Today All-USA High School Football Team.

Henry finished his high school football career with 12,124 career rushing yards, which broke Ken Hall's career record. During this time, Henry began receiving the nickname "King Henry" by stadium crowds and local television news reports as he began aiming to break the national high school rushing title. Henry also rushed for 153 career touchdowns. His career touchdown total ranked fifth all-time at the time of his graduation. In four years at Yulee, Henry averaged more than 250 rushing yards per game and rushed for at least 100 yards in all 48 games of his career, a national record. His 32 career games with at least 200 rushing yards are tied with Toney Baker for the national record.

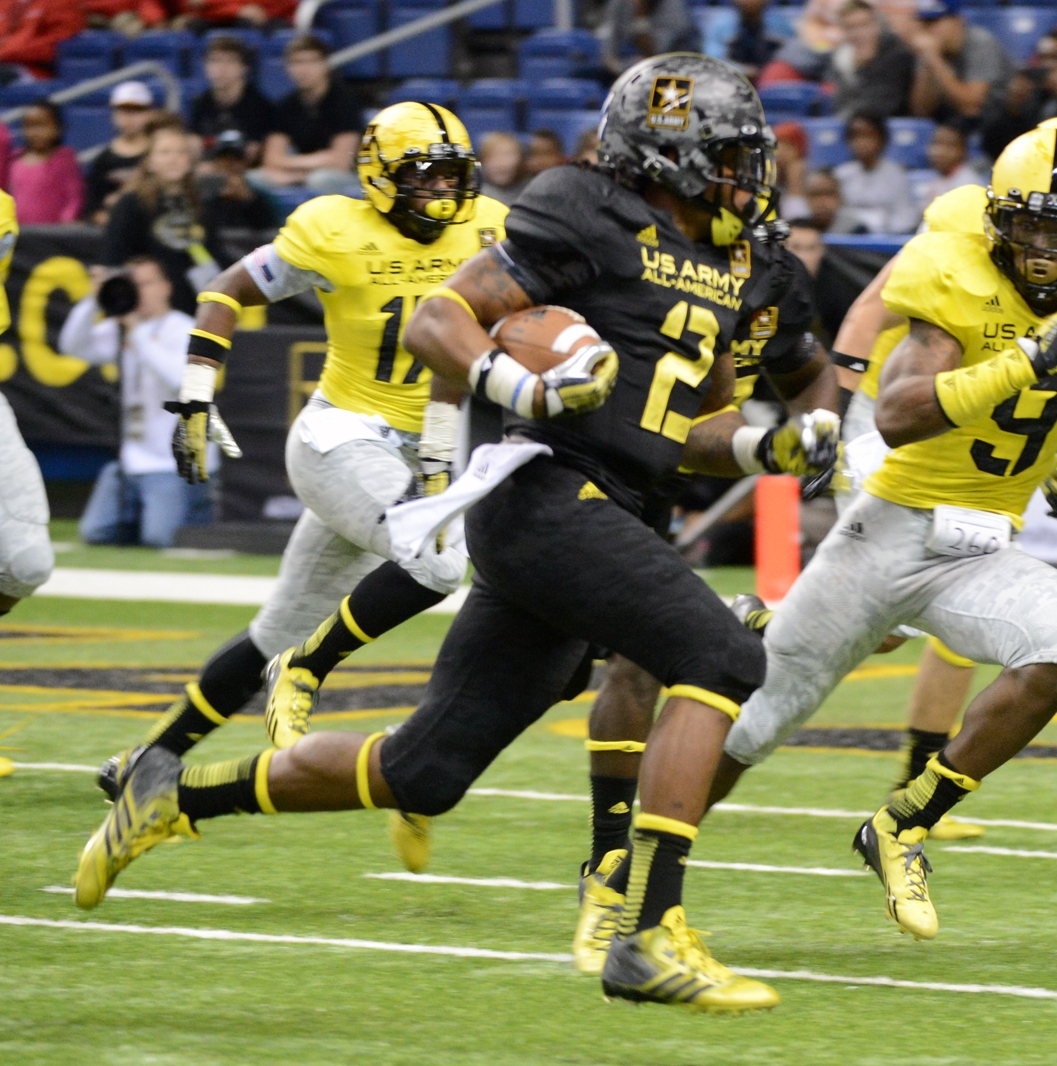
Henry (No. 2) at the U.S. Army All-American Bowl in 2013

Henry played for the East squad in the 2013 U.S. Army All-American Bowl, where he had 10 carries for 53 yards, a touchdown, and a two-point conversion in a winning effort. In 2019, Henry's No. 2 jersey was retired by Yulee. In 2025, MaxPreps ranked him the fourth-greatest high school athlete of the 21st century.

As a track & field athlete, Henry competed as a sprinter at Yulee from 2010 to 2011. As a sophomore, he posted a personal-best time of 11.11 seconds in the 100-meter dash at the 2011 FHSAA 2A District 3 Championships, where he placed seventh. Henry was also a member of the 4×100 and 4×400 squads.

At the Nike Football SPARQ Combine in Orlando on February 26, 2012, Henry ran a 4.58-second 40-yard dash and recorded a vertical jump of just over 40 inches, earning the highest SPARQ score out of more than 1,300 athletes. Considered a five-star recruit by ESPN.com, Scout.com, and 247Sports (which rated him a 99), he was listed as the No. 1 athlete (player with no designated position) in the nation in 2013. After originally committing to the University of Georgia, Henry committed to the University of Alabama on September 28, 2012. He held offers from many of the top college football programs in the country, including USC, Notre Dame, Tennessee, Florida, and Clemson.

College recruiting
Name	Hometown	School	Height	Weight	40^{‡}	Commit date
Derrick Henry; ATH	Yulee, Florida	Yulee	6 ft 3 in (1.91 m)	243 lb (110 kg)	4.58	Sep 28, 2012
Derrick Henry; ATH	Recruit ratings: Scout: 247Sports: ESPN: (90)					

== College career ==
Henry attended and played college football for the University of Alabama from 2013 to 2015 under head coach Nick Saban. Henry majored in communications and graduated on May 4, 2018. That same day, he published an article in The Players' Tribune thanking his late grandmother for the inspiration to continue pursuing his degree.

=== 2013 season ===
As a true freshman in 2013, Henry rushed for 382 yards on 36 carries with three touchdowns in a backfield largely dominated by T. J. Yeldon and Kenyan Drake. On October 19 against Arkansas, he had six carries for 111 rushing yards and his first collegiate rushing touchdown in a 52–0 shutout victory. On November 23 against Chattanooga, he had six carries for 66 yards and a touchdown in another shutout victory, 49–0.

During the 2014 Sugar Bowl, Henry rushed for 100 yards and a touchdown on eight carries and had a 61-yard touchdown reception in the 45–31 loss to the Oklahoma Sooners. In that game, Spanish-language broadcaster Pablo Viruega on ESPN Deportes nicknamed him "El Tractorcito" (The Little Tractor) due to his long stride and powerful gait. The nickname became a popular internet meme.

=== 2014 season ===
In the 2014 season, Henry and Yeldon split the majority of the work in the backfield. In the season opener against West Virginia, he had 113 rushing yards and a touchdown in the 33–23 victory in the Chick-fil-A Kickoff Game. On September 20 against Florida, he had 111 rushing yards and a touchdown in the 42–21 victory. On October 18 against Texas A&M, he carried the ball 10 times for 70 yards and a touchdown, and added a 41-yard receiving touchdown in the 59–0 victory. The following week against Tennessee, he rushed for 78 yards and a touchdown in a 34–20 victory.

On November 22 against Western Carolina, Henry rushed 12 times for 92 yards and two touchdowns, and added a nine-yard receiving touchdown in a 48–14 victory. In the annual rivalry game against Auburn, he carried the ball five times for 72 yards and a touchdown during the high-scoring 55–44 installment of the rivalry. During the SEC Championship against Missouri, he had 141 rushing yards and two rushing touchdowns in the 42–13 victory.

Alabama qualified for the College Football Playoff and faced off against Ohio State in the National Semifinals in the Sugar Bowl. Henry had 95 rushing yards, one rushing touchdown, and two receptions for 54 yards as Alabama fell 42–35 to the Buckeyes. As a sophomore, Henry rushed for 990 yards on 172 carries with 13 total touchdowns.

=== 2015 season: National Championship and Heisman season ===
After Yeldon left for the NFL, Henry took over as the starting running back as a junior in 2015. In the season opener against Wisconsin, he had 147 rushing yards and three rushing touchdowns in the 35–17 victory. In the next game, against Middle Tennessee State, he had 96 rushing yards and three more rushing touchdowns in the 37–10 victory. In the next game against Ole Miss, he had 127 rushing yards, one rushing touchdown, and five receptions for 39 yards in Alabama's only loss of the season, a 43–37 decision. After rushing for 52 yards against Louisiana–Monroe, he had 148 rushing yards and a touchdown in a 38–10 victory over previously undefeated Georgia.

On October 10, Henry rushed for 95 yards and a touchdown against Arkansas in a 27–14 victory. After the victory over the Razorbacks, he went on an impressive stretch of performances. On October 17, against Texas A&M, he had 236 rushing yards, two rushing touchdowns, and an 18-yard reception in a 41–23 victory. The following week against Tennessee, he had 143 rushing yards and two touchdowns in a narrow 19–14 victory. In the following game, a much-anticipated matchup against LSU and fellow Heisman contender Leonard Fournette, Henry rushed for 210 yards and three touchdowns in a 30–16 victory over the previously undefeated Tigers. In the next game, against Mississippi State, he had 204 rushing yards and two rushing touchdowns in the 31–6 victory. In the next game, against Charleston Southern, he had 68 rushing yards and two more rushing touchdowns in a limited role during the 56–6 victory.

During the Iron Bowl against Auburn, Henry rushed for 271 yards and a touchdown on 46 carries in a 29–13 victory. He outgained Auburn's entire offense, which totaled 260 yards, and broke Bo Jackson's record for the most rushing yards in Iron Bowl history. In the SEC Championship against Florida, Henry had 44 carries for 189 yards and a touchdown in a 29–15 victory. He became the first and remains the only running back to rush for at least 100 yards in the SEC Championship twice, and his 330 career rushing yards remain the most in the game's history.

Alabama qualified for the College Football Playoff and faced off against Michigan State in the National Semifinals. In the 38–0 shutout victory over the Spartans in the Cotton Bowl, Henry had 75 rushing yards and two rushing touchdowns. During Alabama's 45–40 victory over Clemson in the 2016 College Football Playoff National Championship, he rushed for 158 yards, the second-most in CFP National Championship Game history, on 36 carries with three touchdowns. During the game, Henry also broke Shaun Alexander's record for most career rushing yards in Alabama history.

Playing in all 15 games, Henry rushed for SEC-record totals of 2,219 yards and 28 touchdowns on 395 carries. He scored at least one touchdown in every game, setting the FBS record for the most games with a touchdown in a season with 15. Henry led the NCAA in rushing attempts, rushing yards, rushing touchdowns, and points scored.

Henry won the Heisman Trophy, beating out finalists Christian McCaffrey and Deshaun Watson. He won numerous other awards, including the Doak Walker Award, Walter Camp Award, and Maxwell Award. Henry declared for the 2016 NFL draft after his junior season.

== Professional career ==
=== Pre-draft ===
Coming out of Alabama, Henry was projected by the majority of analysts to be either drafted in the late first or second round. Scouts regarded his main assets to be his large frame, violent running, ability to break tackles with ease, speed, long strides, superior conditioning, and consistent play. The main concerns were about the wear and tear his body took as a workhorse at Alabama, his slow acceleration, average foot quickness, below-average catching ability, narrow based running style, sluggish cutbacks, and running tall.

Pre-draft measurables
Height	Weight	Arm length	Hand span	Wingspan	40-yard dash	10-yard split	20-yard split	20-yard shuttle	Three-cone drill	Vertical jump	Broad jump	Bench press
6 ft 2 5/8 in (1.90 m)	247 lb (112 kg)	33 in (0.84 m)	8 3/4 in (0.22 m)	6 ft 8 3/4 in (2.05 m)	4.54 s	1.56 s	2.67 s	4.38 s	7.20 s	37.0 in (0.94 m)	10 ft 10 in (3.30 m)	22 reps
All values from NFL Combine

=== Tennessee Titans ===
==== 2016–2017: Backup years ====
Henry was drafted by the Tennessee Titans in the second round (45th overall) of the 2016 NFL draft. He was the second running back taken that year, after #4 overall pick Ezekiel Elliott. Henry was reunited with his former fullback at Alabama Jalston Fowler. On May 9, 2016, the Titans signed Henry to a four-year, $5.40 million contract with $3.30 million guaranteed and a signing bonus of $2.13 million.

Henry began his rookie season as the backup running back to veteran DeMarco Murray. He wore the No. 2 jersey throughout training camp and preseason and donned the No. 22 once running back Dexter McCluster was cut on September 2, 2016.

Henry made his NFL debut and earned his first NFL start in the Titans' season-opening loss to the Minnesota Vikings. He finished the game with five carries for three yards and two receptions for 41 yards. During Week 8, Henry scored his first NFL touchdown on a 6-yard rush in a 36–22 victory over the Jacksonville Jaguars. He finished the game with 16 carries for a then career-high 60 rushing yards and a rushing touchdown and four catches for 37 yards. On December 18, 2016, he had nine rushing attempts for 58 rushing yards and a season-high two rushing touchdowns in a 19–17 road victory over the Kansas City Chiefs. During the season finale against the Houston Texans, he ran for a then-career-high 65 rushing yards on 15 carries and scored a touchdown in the 24–17 victory.

Henry finished his rookie season with 110 carries for 490 yards (both sixth among NFL rookies in 2016) and five touchdowns in 15 games and two starts. He also caught 13 passes for 137 yards.

For most of the 2017 season, Henry split carries with DeMarco Murray and run-oriented quarterback Marcus Mariota. During Week 2, Henry ran for 92 yards and a touchdown on 14 carries in a 37–16 road victory against the Jaguars. On October 16, 2017, on Monday Night Football, Henry ran for a then career-best 131 yards on 19 carries, including a 72-yard touchdown late in the fourth quarter of the 36–22 victory over the Indianapolis Colts. In addition, he had a 14-yard reception in the victory. During Week 13, Henry ran for 109 yards on 11 carries and beat his longest rush of the year with a 75-yard rushing touchdown late in the fourth quarter of the 24–13 victory over the Texans. In the regular season finale against the Jaguars, Henry caught his first receiving touchdown on a 66-yard reception from Marcus Mariota in the 15–10 victory.

The Titans finished second in the AFC South with a 9–7 record and made the playoffs as a wild-card team. In the wild-card round, the Titans played the Chiefs. Because DeMarco Murray was out with a knee injury, Henry got the start. In a 22–21 road victory, Henry had the best performance of his career up to that point, rushing for 156 yards and a touchdown on 23 carries and catching two passes for 35 yards. His 191 yards-from-scrimmage was a franchise record. In the Divisional Round against the New England Patriots, Henry had 28 rushing yards and 21 receiving yards in the 35–14 road loss.

Henry finished the regular season with 176 carries for 744 rushing yards and five touchdowns in 15 games and two starts. He also caught 11 passes for 136 yards and a touchdown. In the postseason, Henry ran for 184 yards and a touchdown on 35 carries and caught five passes for 56 yards.

==== 2018: Transition to starter ====
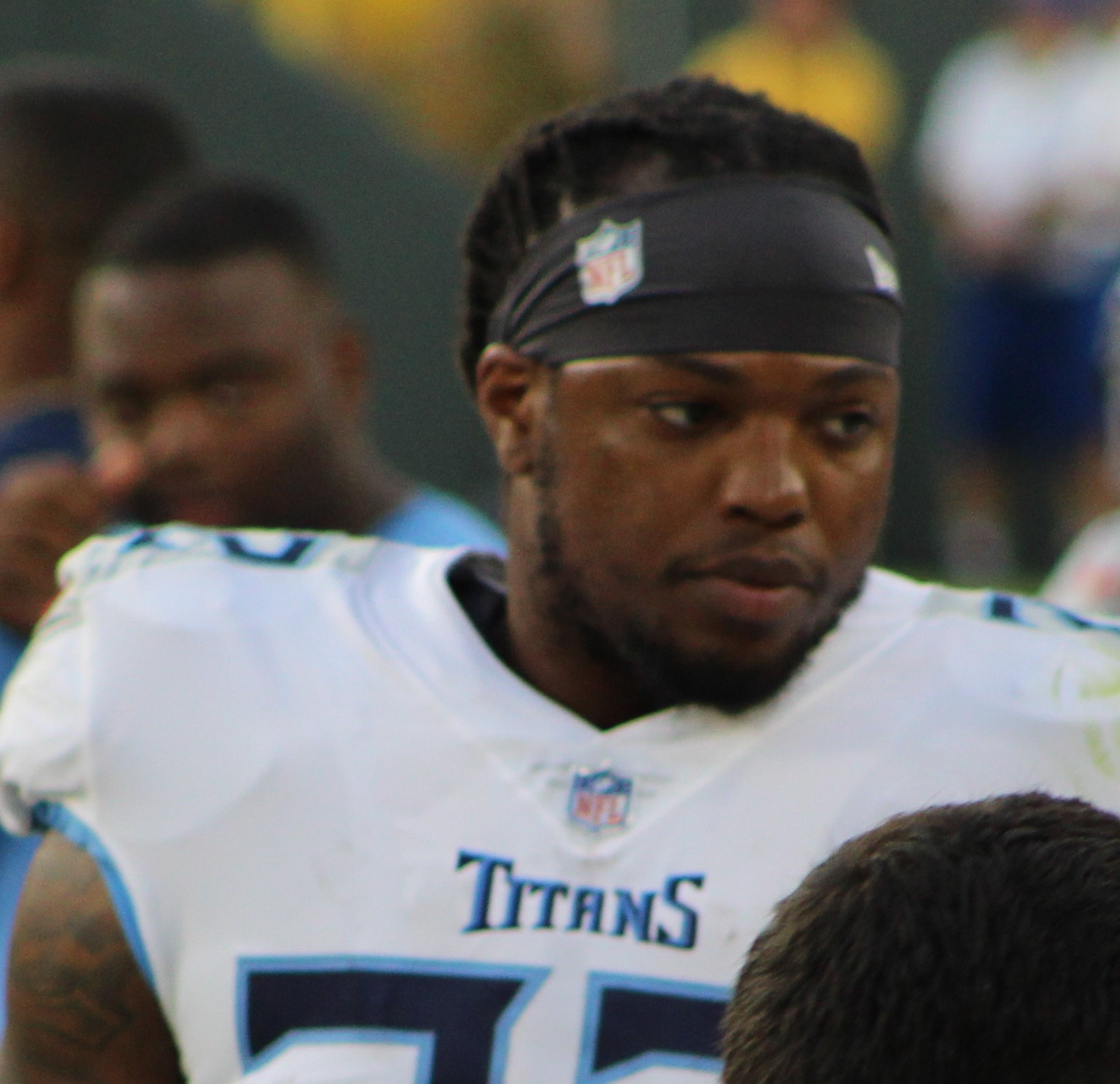
Henry in 2018

During the 2018 offseason, Matt LaFleur was hired as the Titans' new offensive coordinator and the team also acquired running back Dion Lewis. Lewis's pass-catching ability was seen as a fit for LaFleur's offensive scheme, which often employed running backs to catch passes out of the backfield, and leading to success with Todd Gurley in the previous season as offensive coordinator with the Rams. This led to speculation that LaFleur would favor Lewis over Henry.

Henry ended up splitting carries with Lewis and run-oriented quarterback Marcus Mariota for most of the 2018 season. During Week 2, Henry recorded an eight-yard pass completion, the first of his career, to wide receiver Taywan Taylor in the Titans' 20–17 victory over the Texans. He also had 18 carries in that game and the next against the Jaguars, but was used much less frequently through the middle of the season.

From Weeks 4–13, Henry averaged nine carries for only 37 yards per game, and never rushed for over 60 yards. This all changed in Week 14 against the Jaguars. In the second quarter, Henry had a 99-yard touchdown run, fending off three tacklers, tying him with Tony Dorsett for the longest NFL touchdown run. He finished the game with four rushing touchdowns and 238 rushing yards on 17 carries, breaking Chris Johnson's franchise record of 228 yards in 2009. He also became the ninth player in NFL history to record a 200+ yard and 4+ touchdown game, and the first to do so on fewer than 22 carries. His 238 rushing yards were the most by any player for a single game for the 2018 season. Henry was named the AFC Offensive Player of the Week due to his spectacular performance.

During Week 15, the Titans went on the road to face the New York Giants. In a cold and rainy game, Henry led the NFL in rushing for the second consecutive week with 170 yards and two touchdowns on a career-high 33 carries, along with a one-yard reception and six-yard pass completion in the 17–0 shutout. In Weeks 16 and 17, he combined for 177 rushing yards and a touchdown in the two games against the Washington Redskins and Colts. He was later named the AFC Offensive Player of the Month for December.

Henry finished the 2018 season with 1,059 rushing yards and 12 touchdowns along with 15 receptions for 99 yards. After the season, he was ranked 99th on the NFL Top 100 Players of 2019.

==== 2019: First rushing title ====
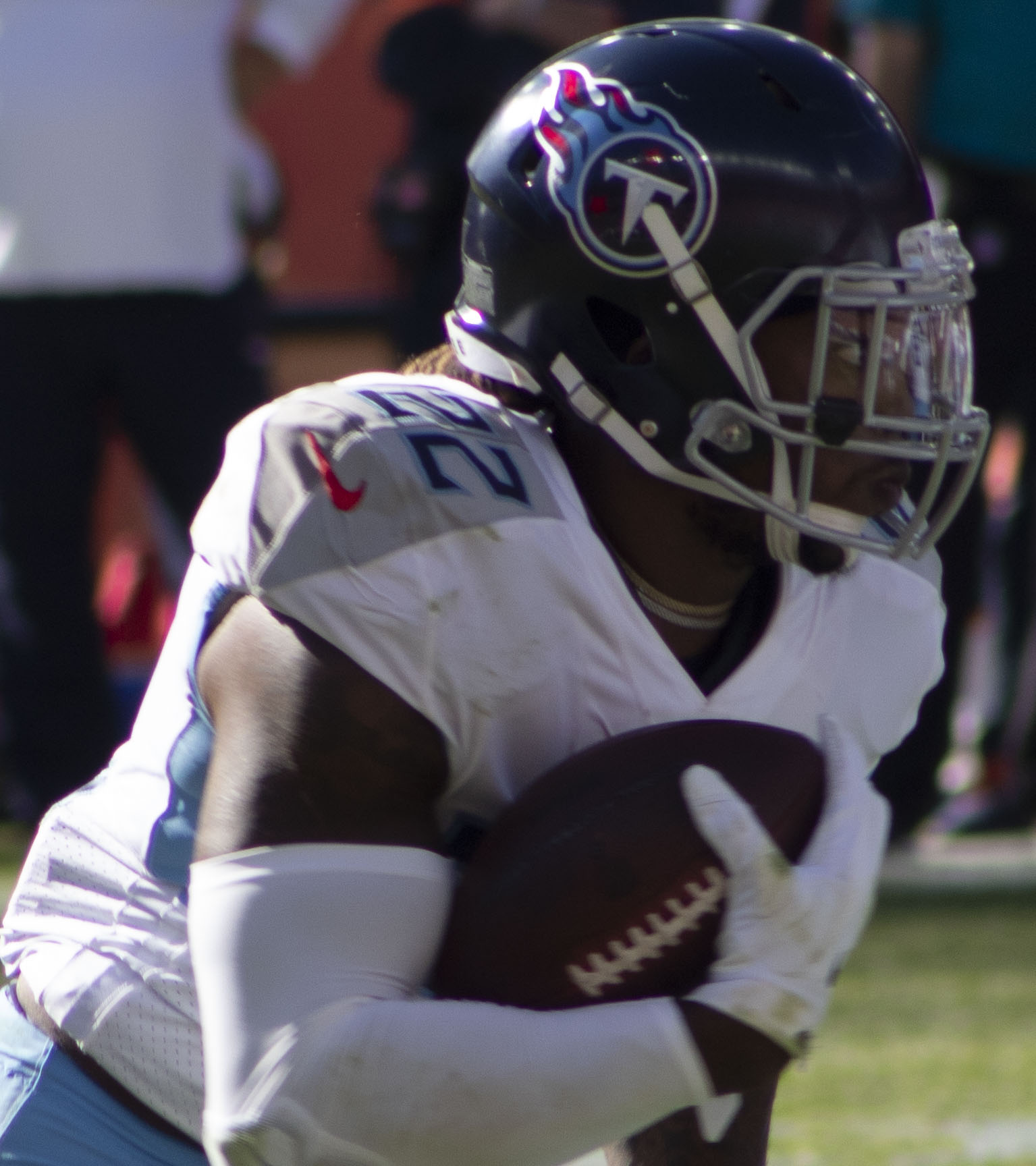
Henry in 2019

In the 2019 season opener against the Cleveland Browns, Henry rushed 19 times for 84 yards and a touchdown. He also caught one pass for a 75-yard touchdown as the Titans won on the road 43–13. During Week 2 against the Colts, he rushed 15 times for 81 yards and a touchdown as the Titans narrowly lost 19–17. Two weeks later against the Atlanta Falcons, Henry had his first 100-yard game of the season when he rushed for 100 yards on 27 carries in a 24–10 road victory. In the next game against the Buffalo Bills, he rushed for 78 yards and a touchdown as the Titans lost by a score of 14–7. After a season-low 28 yards in a Week 6 shutout loss to the Denver Broncos, Henry sank to 12th in the league in rushing, over 200 yards behind the league leaders he would eventually catch. Henry responded with 90 rushing yards and a touchdown in a 23–20 victory against the Los Angeles Chargers in Week 7.

During Week 9 against the Carolina Panthers, Henry rushed 13 times for 63 yards and a touchdown and caught three passes for 36 yards and a touchdown in the 30–20 road loss. In the next game against the Chiefs, he finished with 188 rushing yards and two touchdowns as the Titans narrowly won 35–32. Henry won the FedEx Ground Player of the Week for his efforts. During a Jaguars rematch in Week 12 after a Week 11 bye, Henry had a 74-yard rushing touchdown in the third quarter. Overall, he finished the 42–20 victory with 159 rushing yards and two touchdowns along with one reception for 16 yards. In the next game, a rematch against the Colts, he rushed 26 times for 149 yards and a touchdown in the 31–17 road victory.

During Week 14 against the Oakland Raiders, Henry ran for 103 yards and two touchdowns in the 42–21 road victory. During the regular-season finale against the Texans, Henry finished with 211 rushing yards and three touchdowns as the Titans won 35–14 and made it to the playoffs as a wild-card team. During the game, Henry narrowly won the 2019 rushing title over Nick Chubb of the Cleveland Browns, with the winning rush being a 53-yard touchdown run. This was Henry's first career rushing crown and the first Titan to win it since Chris Johnson in 2009.

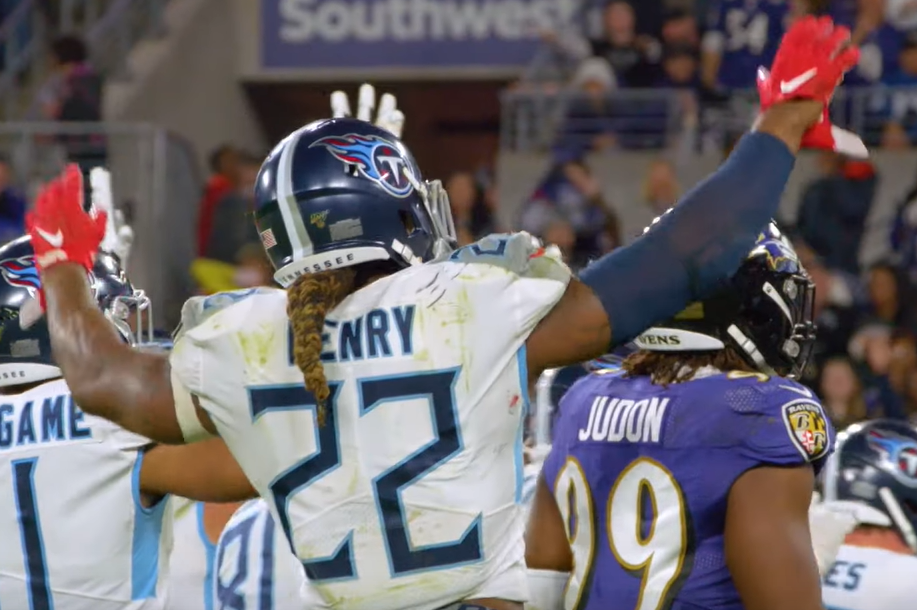
Henry after throwing a touchdown pass in the AFC Divisional Playoffs against the Baltimore Ravens

Henry finished the regular season setting career-highs in carries with 303, rushing yards with 1,540, and rushing touchdowns with 16, which all led the league, despite only playing in 15 games, missing the Week 16 game against the New Orleans Saints due to a hamstring injury. He also set career-highs in receptions with 16, receiving yards with 206, and receiving touchdowns with two. On December 17, 2019, he was selected to his first Pro Bowl. On January 3, 2020, he was named to the second-team All-Pro at both the running back and flex position, both behind Christian McCaffrey. He was ranked 10th by his fellow players on the NFL Top 100 Players of 2020.

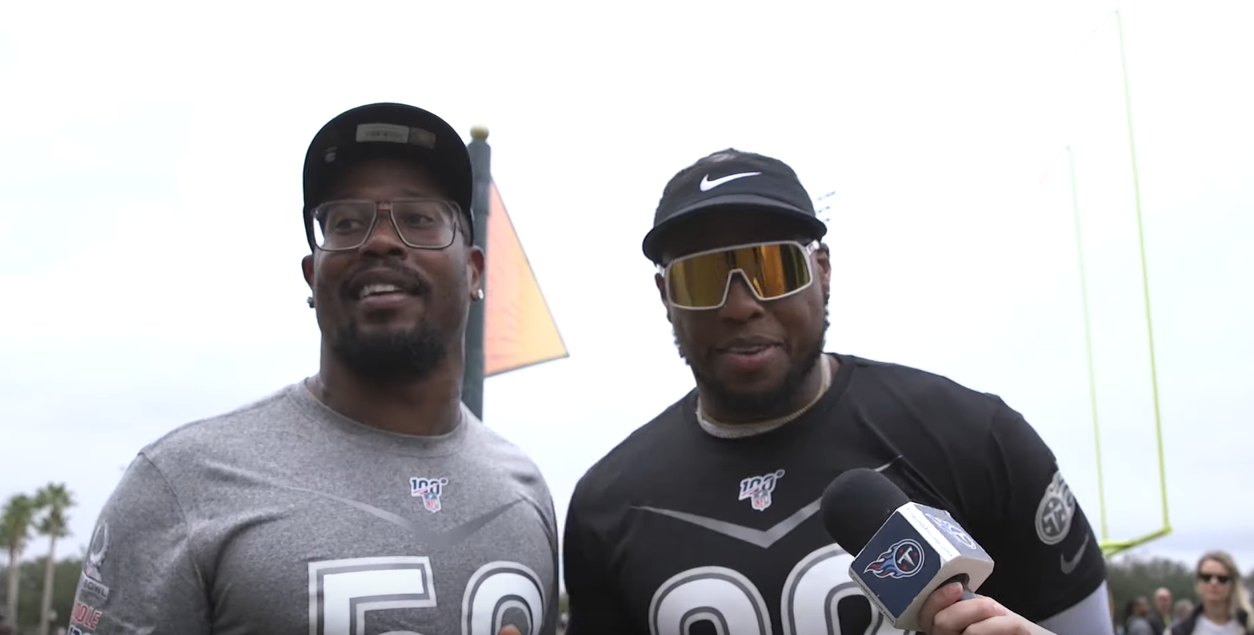
Henry alongside Von Miller at the 2020 Pro Bowl

With the Titans finishing the season 9–7, the team narrowly clinched a wild-card spot for the #6 seed. In the wild-card round against the defending Super Bowl champion Patriots, which was played on his 26th birthday, Henry rushed for over 100 yards and a touchdown in the first half, finishing with 182 yards (the most ever against a Bill Belichick-led team, and the third most ever in a postseason road game) and a 22-yard reception in the 20–13 road victory. Henry became the first rushing champion with a 100-yard playoff game since Terrell Davis in 1998, the first to win a playoff game since LaDainian Tomlinson in 2007, and the second Titan with multiple post-season 100+ rushing games. He also broke his own franchise record for most yards-from-scrimmage with 204. During the Divisional Round against the Baltimore Ravens, Henry rushed 30 times for 195 yards and threw a three-yard touchdown pass to wide receiver Corey Davis in the 28–12 road victory. He became the second player in NFL history with three postseason games with at least 150 rushing yards, joining Terrell Davis, who had four. In addition, he became the only player with at least 175 rushing yards in consecutive games. Davis is the only other with two such games in a career. In the AFC Championship against the Chiefs, Henry was mostly held in check. During the game, he rushed 19 times for 69 yards and a touchdown in the 35–24 road loss.

On March 16, 2020, the Titans placed the franchise tag on Henry. He signed the tag on April 2, 2020. Henry signed a new four-year $50 million contract with the team on July 15, 2020.

==== 2020: Second rushing title and Offensive Player of the Year ====
Despite leading the league in rushing yards for most of the first four weeks of the 2020 season, Henry was limited to no more than 3.7 yards per carry for all but one of them. These struggles ended in the week 6 game against the Texans, Henry finished with 212 rushing yards, 52 receiving yards, and two touchdowns (including a 94-yard rushing touchdown). In overtime, he finished the game with a five-yard touchdown to end the game as the Titans won 42–36. Henry was named the AFC Offensive Player of the Week for his performance in Week 6. He was also named AFC Offensive Player of the Month for October after racking up 399 scrimmage yards with 344 yards rushing and five touchdowns. During a Week 8 31–20 road loss to the Cincinnati Bengals, he ran for 112 yards and a touchdown.

In Week 11 against the Ravens, Henry had 133 rushing yards and the game-winning touchdown in overtime to defeat the Ravens on the road 30–24. In a 45–26 road victory against the Colts in Week 12, Henry had 27 carries for 178 rushing yards and three touchdowns. In Week 14 against the Jaguars, Henry rushed 26 times for 215 yards and two touchdowns during the 31–10 victory.

In Week 15 against the Detroit Lions, Henry rushed for 147 yards and a touchdown during the 46–25 win. In Week 17 against the Texans, Henry rushed for a career-high 250 rushing yards and two touchdowns during the 41–38 road victory. Henry was named the AFC Offensive Player of the Week for his performance. During the game, Henry became the eighth running back in NFL history to surpass 2,000 rushing yards. This also made him the only player to have 2,000 yard rushing seasons in high school, college, and the NFL.

In addition to his 2,027 rushing yards, Henry established career highs in carries (378), yards-per-carry (5.4) and rushing touchdowns (17). He was named the 2020 Offensive Player of the Year at the 10th NFL Honors. He was ranked fourth by his fellow players on the NFL Top 100 Players of 2021.

In the wild-card round of the playoffs against the Ravens, Henry was held without a single first down. He was limited to 40 yards on 18 carries (2.2 yards-per-carry) and three receptions for 11 yards during the 20–13 loss.

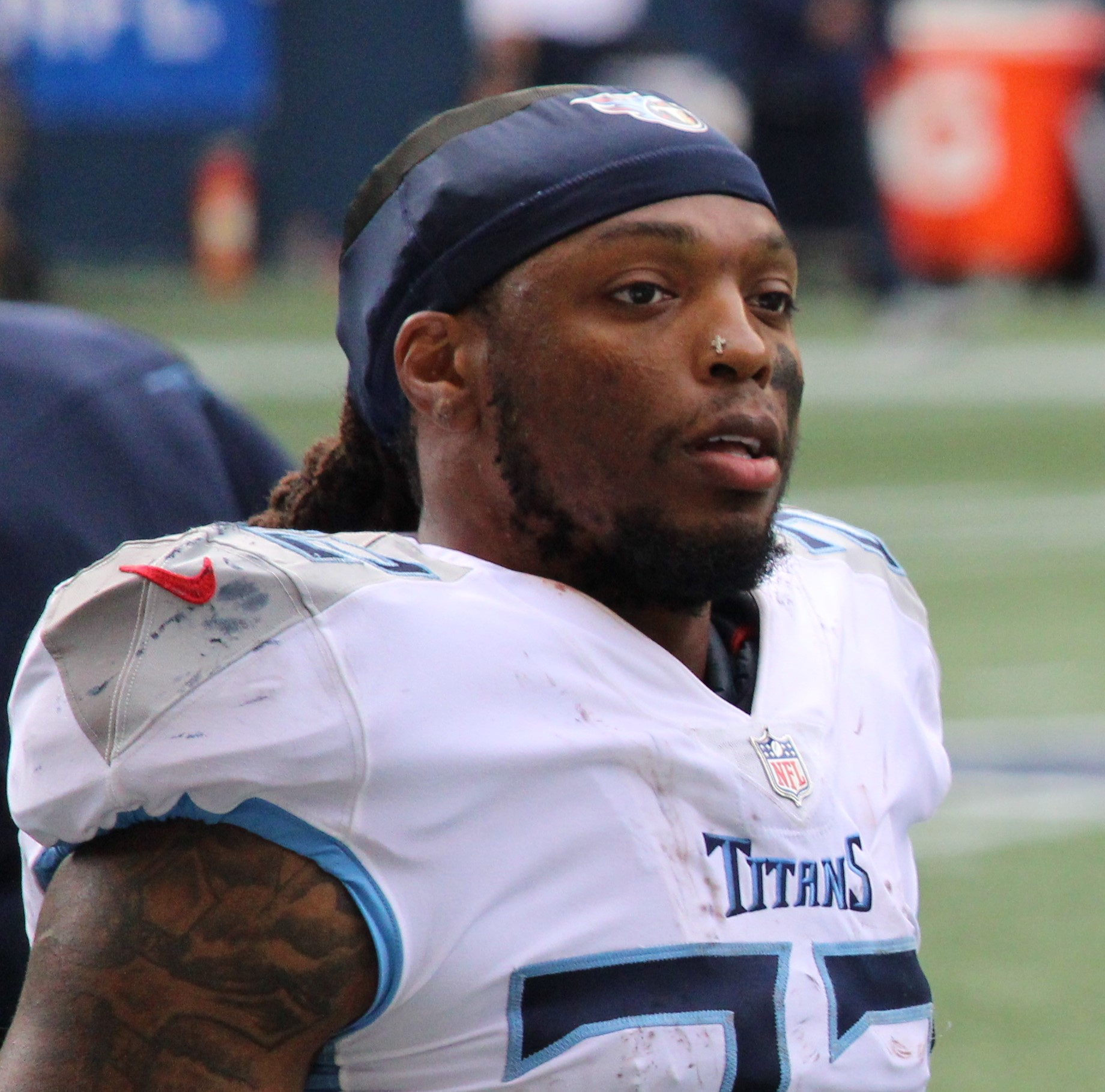
Henry in 2021

==== 2021: Injury-shortened season ====
Henry began the season slowly, held to only 58 rushing yards as the Titans lost to the Arizona Cardinals 38–13. During Week 2 against the Seattle Seahawks, Henry finished with 182 rushing yards, 55 receiving yards, and three rushing touchdowns as the Titans won 33–30 in overtime. He earned AFC Offensive Player of the Week for Week 2. In Week 6, Henry ran for 143 yards and three touchdowns in a 34–31 win over the Bills, earning his second AFC Offensive Player of the Week honor of the year.

During a Week 8 win against the Colts, Henry suffered a Jones fracture that would end up sidelining him for the remainder of the regular season. He was placed on injured reserve on November 1. Prior to his injury, Henry was leading the league in carries, rushing yards and rushing touchdowns, and was on pace to break the NFL rushing record. Henry was named the Titans' nominee for the 2021 Walter Payton NFL Man of the Year Award.

Henry was activated off injured reserve on January 21, 2022, for the team's Divisional Round game against the Bengals. In his return, Henry had 20 carries for 62 yards along with a rushing touchdown in the Titans' 19–16 loss. He was ranked 12th by his fellow players on the NFL Top 100 Players of 2022.

==== 2022: Return from injury ====
Prior to the 2022 season on September 1, 2022, Henry was given a raise by the Titans, receiving a $2 million bump for the year.

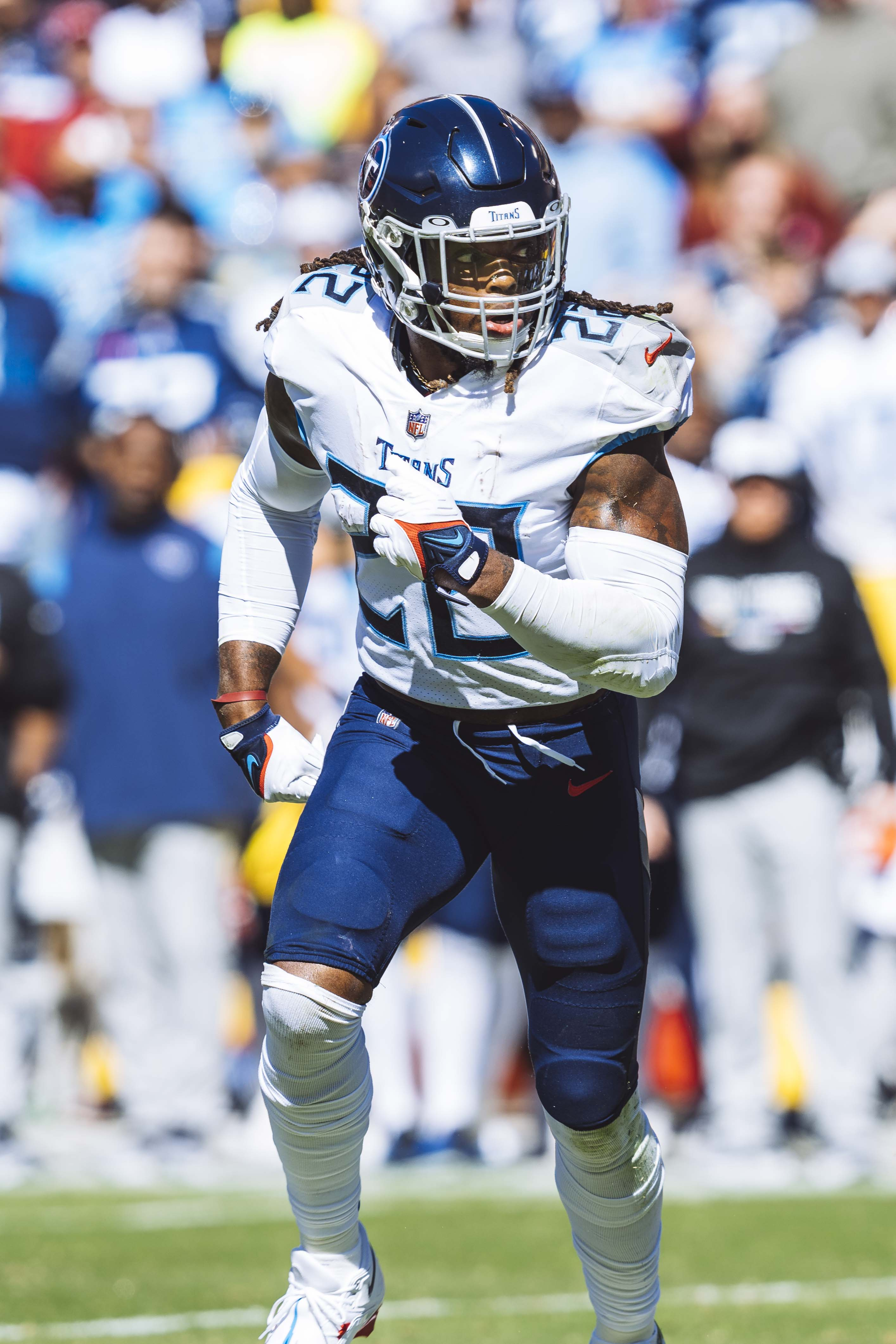
Henry playing in 2022

In Week 3, against the Las Vegas Raiders, Henry had 143 scrimmage yards and a rushing touchdown in the 24–22 victory. In the following game, against the Colts, Henry had 22 carries for 114 rushing yards and a rushing touchdown in the 24–17 victory. One week later, he had 28 carries for 102 rushing yards and two rushing touchdowns in a 21–17 victory over the Washington Commanders. In Week 7, Henry had 30 carries for 128 rushing yards in a 19–10 victory over the Colts. In Week 8, Henry had 32 carries for 219 yards and two touchdowns in a 17–10 win over the Texans, earning AFC Offensive Player of the Week. He was named AFC Offensive Player of the Month for October.

In Week 9, against the Chiefs, Henry had 17 carries for 115 rushing yards and two rushing touchdowns in the 20–17 overtime loss. In Week 11, against the Green Bay Packers, Henry had 132 scrimmage yards and one rushing touchdown. In addition, he threw a three-yard touchdown pass to Austin Hooper in the 27–17 victory. In Week 14, against the Jaguars, he had 155 scrimmage yards in the 36–22 loss. In the following week against the Chargers, Henry had 163 scrimmage yards and a rushing touchdown in the 17–14 loss. In Week 16, Henry had 23 carries for 126 rushing yards and a rushing touchdown in the 19–14 loss to the Texans. With Week 17 having no bearing on the Titans' playoff hopes, Henry was rested for the Dallas Cowboys game. In the Week 18 winner-take-all game for the AFC South, Henry had 30 carries for 109 rushing yards in the 20–16 elimination loss to the Jaguars.

In the 2022 season, Henry finished with 349 carries for 1,538 rushing yards and 13 rushing touchdowns to go along with 33 receptions for 398 receiving yards. He led the league in rushing attempts and finished second in rushing yards and rushing touchdowns. He was named to the Pro Bowl. Henry was ranked 25th by his fellow players on the NFL Top 100 Players of 2023. For the second year in a row, he was the Titans' nominee for the Walter Payton NFL Man of the Year Award.

==== 2023: Final season in Tennessee ====
In Week 1, a loss to the New Orleans Saints, Henry had 119 scrimmage yards. In a Week 4 victory over the Bengals, he had 22 carries for 122 yards and a touchdown. Two weeks later, he carried the ball 12 times for 97 yards and a touchdown in a 24–16 loss to the Ravens. In the following game, he totaled 122 yards in a 28–23 victory over the Falcons. The next week, he totaled 102 yards and a rushing touchdown in a 20–16 loss to the Pittsburgh Steelers.

In Weeks 12–14, Henry rushed for two touchdowns in three consecutive games. In Week 15 against the Texans, Henry had a poor performance, becoming the first player in NFL history to have at least 20 touches and generate less than 15 yards from scrimmage. In Week 16, he had a rushing and passing touchdown. In the regular season finale, Henry rushed 19 times for 153 yards and a touchdown in a 28–20 victory over the Jaguars.

In the 2023 season, Henry finished with 280 carries for 1,167 rushing yards, the most in the AFC, and 12 rushing touchdowns. He also had 28 receptions for 214 receiving yards. He was ranked 49th by his fellow players on the NFL Top 100 Players of 2024.

=== Baltimore Ravens ===
==== 2024: Debut with the Ravens ====
On March 12, 2024, Henry signed with the Baltimore Ravens on a two-year, $16 million deal worth up to $20 million which also included $9 million fully guaranteed in the first year.

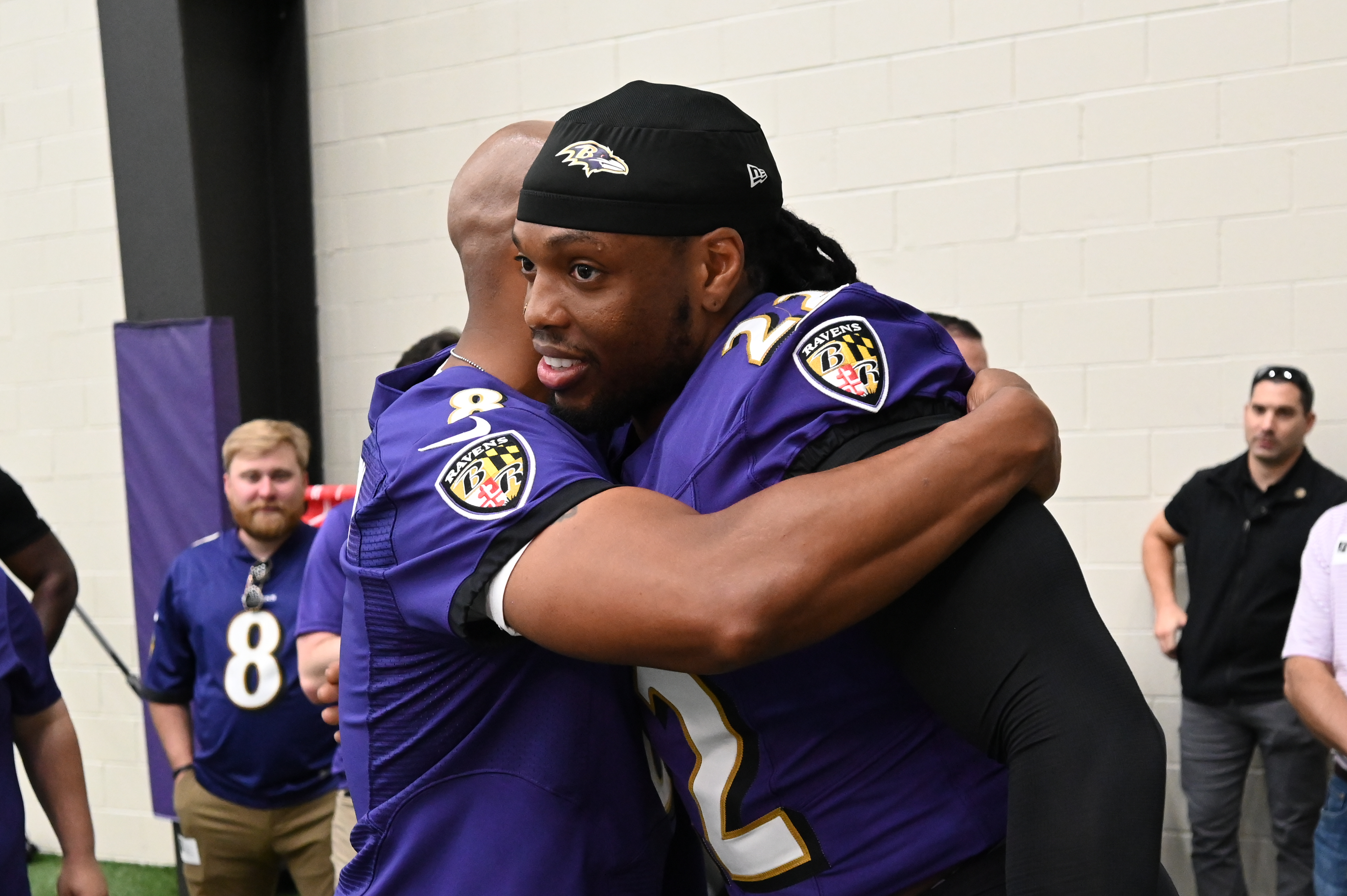
Henry with Maryland governor Wes Moore at Ravens training camp in 2024

In Week 3, Henry had 151 rushing yards on 25 attempts and two touchdowns in a 28–25 win against the Cowboys. In Week 4 against the Bills, Henry had 199 rushing yards and a touchdown on 24 carries with an 87-yard rushing score on the Ravens' first offensive play, which was the longest run in franchise history. He also had 10 receiving yards and a touchdown on three receptions. The Ravens won 35–10. For his performance in Week 4, Henry was named AFC Offensive Player of the Week.

In Week 5 against the Bengals, Henry scored his 100th overall career touchdown, while also reaching the mark of 10,000 career rushing yards later in the game, becoming the fifth player in NFL history to achieve the feat. The Ravens won in overtime, 41–38. In Week 6, Henry rushed for 132 yards and two touchdowns in a 30–23 win over the Commanders, earning AFC Offensive Player of the Week. In Week 7 against the Tampa Bay Buccaneers, he had 15 carries for 169 rushing yards and added a receiving touchdown in the 41–31 win. In Week 9 against the Denver Broncos, he had 23 carries for 106 yards and two touchdowns in the 41–10 victory. In Week 12, against the Chargers, he had 24 carries for 140 yards and a touchdown in the 30–23 win. In Week 16 against the Steelers, he had 24 carries for 162 yards in the 34–17 win. In Week 17 against the Texans, he had 27 carries for 147 yards and a touchdown in the 31–2 win. In Week 18, Henry celebrated his 31st birthday with 20 carries for 138 yards and 2 touchdowns while adding 2 receptions for 23 yards in a 35–10 win against the Browns.

Henry finished the season with 325 carries for 1,921 yards, the second most in the league behind Saquon Barkley, while rushing for 16 touchdowns and adding two receiving touchdowns. He led all running backs with 5.9 yards per rush attempt, in part due to his yards after contact (909) and broken tackles (42) which were both the highest in the league. He also finished tied with James Cook and Jahmyr Gibbs as the NFL rushing touchdowns leader with 16.

He became the first running back in NFL history with 1,500+ rushing yards and 15+ rushing touchdowns in 3 different seasons, and was named to his fifth overall Pro Bowl, first as a Raven. On January 10, 2024, Henry was named second-team All Pro for the third time of his career. He was also named a finalist for Offensive Player of the Year for the second time in his career.

In his first postseason game with the Ravens and his first since 2021, Henry set a Ravens franchise record for rushing yards in a postseason game by rushing for 186 yards and two touchdowns in a 28–14 Wild Card round victory over their divisional rival Steelers. In the Divisional round, Henry ran for 84 yards and a touchdown in a 27–25 loss against the Bills. He was ranked seventh by his fellow players on the NFL Top 100 Players of 2025.

==== 2025 ====
On May 14, 2025, Henry signed a two-year contract extension with the Ravens worth $30 million total with $25 million guaranteed.

In Week 1, Henry rushed for 169 yards and two touchdowns on 18 carries, surpassing Jim Brown for sixth most rushing touchdowns in NFL history in a 41–40 loss to the Bills. In Week 6, he recorded 122 rushing yards on 24 carries in a loss to the Rams. In Week 8, he ran for 71 yards and two touchdowns in a 30–16 win over the Chicago Bears, passing Walter Payton for fifth on the career rushing touchdowns list. In Week 9, Henry carried 19 times for 119 yards in a 28–6 victory against the Miami Dolphins, becoming the 17th player to reach 12,000 career rushing yards and the eighth to record at least 12,000 rushing yards and 100 rushing touchdowns.

During Week 11, Henry rushed for 103 yards and a touchdown on 18 carries and added two receptions for 19 yards in a 23–16 victory over the Browns. In the next game, he rushed for 64 yards and two touchdowns during a 23–10 victory over the New York Jets, surpassing Hall of Famers Marcus Allen, Edgerrin James, and Marshall Faulk on the all-time rushing yards list. The following week, Henry recorded over 100 yards from scrimmage and a touchdown, surpassing Jim Brown's career rushing yards mark despite a 32–14 loss to the Bengals.

During Week 14, Henry rushed for 94 yards in a 27–22 loss to the Steelers, becoming just the fourth player in NFL history to post at least 1,000 rushing yards and 10 rushing touchdowns in seven different seasons. In Week 17, Henry rushed for 216 yards and four touchdowns, surpassing Adrian Peterson and OJ Simpson's record for the most 200+ rushing yard games of all time, in a 41–24 victory over the Green Bay Packers, as well as moving into 10th all time in career rushing yardage, surpassing Hall of Famer Tony Dorsett. He was named AFC Offensive Player of the Week for Week 17. In a Week 18 playoff-deciding game for both teams, Henry had 20 carries for 126 yards during the narrow 26–24 loss to the Steelers, surpassing 13,000 career rushing yards.

Henry finished the season with 307 carries for 1,595 yards and 16 touchdowns, ranking second in the league in both categories, and added 15 receptions for 150 yards. He was named the Ravens' nominee for the Walter Payton NFL Man of the Year Award for the third time in his career and ranked 15th on the NFL Top 100 Players of 2025.

==== 2026 ====
During the season-opening 41–23 road victory over the Indianapolis Colts, Henry recorded 24 carries for 144 yards and three touchdowns, surpassing Marcus Allen for third most rushing touchdowns in NFL history. In Week 3, Henry rushed 26 times for 89 yards and two touchdowns, surpassing Eric Dickerson for ninth on the NFL's all-time career rushing yards list, in a 34–31 overtime victory over the Cowboys at the Maracanã in Rio de Janeiro. Against the Falcons in Week 5, Henry totaled 120 yards, caught a touchdown, and scored the game-tying two-point conversion with 40 seconds remaining in regulation as the Ravens went on to win 30–23 in overtime.

== Player profile ==
=== Playing style ===
Standing at 6 feet 3 inches (1.91 m) tall and weighing 252 pounds (114 kg), Henry is much larger than most running backs and has a frame comparable to that of a linebacker. Henry is a "power back", using his large size and strength to overpower defenders, and signature stiff-arm to break tackles. According to ESPN Research, which began tracking stiff-arms in 2017, Henry had recorded 64 stiff-arms on rushing attempts through Week 2 of the 2025 season, 36 more than any other player during that span.

In 2020, he accumulated 1,073 yards after contact, over 300 yards more than any running back in the league, and led the league in broken tackles with 34. He couples that strength and size with surprising speed and agility relative to his size.

Prior to the 2016 NFL draft, Henry appeared on an episode of Sport Science, where he recorded a 20-yard acceleration time of 2.63 seconds, the fastest of any offensive player tested that year. His acceleration over the first five yards was also the fastest of any player at any position tested over the previous three drafts. Henry then plowed through 1,500 pounds of heavy bags in 1.397 seconds, 27% faster than any running back tested over the previous four drafts. According to Sport Science, his combination of speed and power allowed him to generate, in the open field, momentum comparable to that of a wrecking ball swinging at approximately five miles per hour.

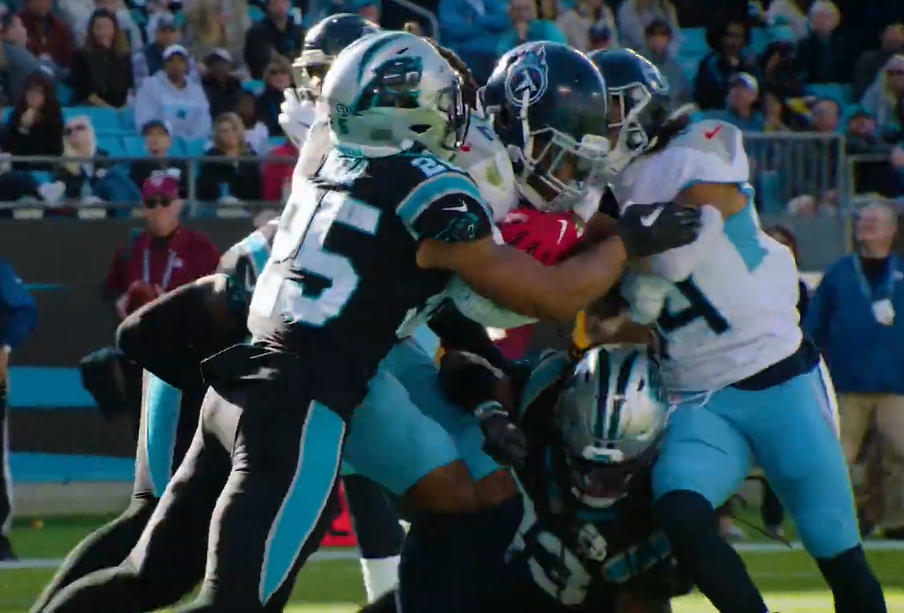
Henry - Week 9, 2019

As a power back, Henry's playing style contrasts with those of smaller, so-called "scat backs", who have greater elusiveness due to their faster ability to change directions. Henry is not usually used as a receiver, instead being used for his dominance as a pure runner.

Opponents have emphasized the need to stop Henry's momentum before he reaches the second level, where he has been likened to a train. Observers have also noted that Henry tends to improve, particularly in yards per carry, in the later stages of a game, as his strength and toughness wear down opponents. Henry's successful running game has also permitted the offense success with play-action.

=== Jersey number ===
Throughout his high school career at Yulee, Henry wore No. 2, later explaining that he chose the number because he plays football for two reasons: God and his family. At Alabama, he wore No. 27 during his freshman and sophomore seasons, as wide receiver DeAndrew White held No. 2. After White declared for the 2015 NFL draft, Henry switched back to No. 2 for his junior year.

Upon being drafted by the Tennessee Titans in 2016, Henry was required to change his number again due to an NFL rule at the time that restricted running backs to numbers between 20 and 49. He selected No. 22, which he has worn throughout his NFL career, in honor of former Alabama teammate Altee Tenpenny, who died in a car accident in 2015 and had told Henry that if he ever reached the NFL, he would wear that number.

== Career statistics ==
Legend
	AP NFL Offensive Player of the Year
	NFL record
	Led the league
**Bold**	Career high

=== NFL ===
==== Regular season ====
Year	Team	Games		Rushing						Receiving						Passing								Fumbles		Scoring
Year	Team	GP	GS	Att	Yds	Avg	Lng	TD	FD	Rec	Yds	Avg	Lng	TD	FD	Cmp	Att	Pct	Yds	Avg	TD	Int	Rtg	Fum	Lost	Pts
2016	TEN	15	2	110	490	4.5	22	5	29	13	137	10.5	29	0	5	—	—	—	—	—	—	—	—	0	0	30
2017	TEN	16	2	176	744	4.2	75T	5	40	11	136	**12.4**	66T	1	4	—	—	—	—	—	—	—	—	1	0	36
2018	TEN	16	12	215	1,059	4.9	**99T**	12	50	15	99	6.6	21	0	4	**2**	**3**	66.7	**14**	4.7	0	0	77.1	1	1	72
2019	TEN	15	15	303	1,540	5.1	74T	16	73	18	206	11.4	**75T**	**2**	4	—	—	—	—	—	—	—	—	5	**3**	**108**
2020	TEN	16	16	**378**	**2,027**	5.4	94T	**17**	98	19	114	6.0	53	0	4	—	—	—	—	—	—	—	—	3	2	104
2021	TEN	8	8	219	937	4.3	76T	10	54	18	154	8.6	16	0	7	1	1	**100.0**	5	**5.0**	1	0	**127.1**	1	0	62
2022	TEN	16	16	349	1,538	4.4	56	13	65	**33**	**398**	12.1	69	0	**11**	**2**	2	**100.0**	4	2.0	1	0	118.8	**6**	**3**	78
2023	TEN	17	17	280	1,167	4.2	69	12	63	28	214	7.6	46	0	7	**2**	**3**	66.7	**14**	4.7	**2**	0	116.7	0	0	72
2024	BAL	17	17	325	1,921	**5.9**	87T	16	**106**	19	193	10.2	27	**2**	**11**	—	—	—	—	—	—	—	—	3	1	**108**
2025	BAL	17	17	307	1,595	5.2	59	16	79	15	150	10.0	44	0	4	0	1	0.0	0	0	0	0	39.6	4	**3**	96
2026	BAL	10	10	185	699	3.8	32	10	32	17	85	5.0	20	1	4	1	1	**100.0**	-3	-3.0	—	—	79.2	1	1	56
Career		163	132	2,847	13,717	4.8	99T	132	692	206	1,886	9.2	75T	6	65	8	11	72.7	34	3.1	4	0	115.2	25	14	822

==== Postseason ====
Year	Team	Games		Rushing						Receiving						Passing								Fumbles		Scoring
Year	Team	GP	GS	Att	Yds	Avg	Lng	TD	FD	Rec	Yds	Avg	Lng	TD	FD	Cmp	Att	Pct	Yds	Avg	TD	Int	Rtg	Fum	Lost	Pts
2017	TEN	2	2	35	184	5.3	35	1	6	**5**	**56**	**11.2**	**29**	0	**1**	—	—	—	—	—	—	—	—	**1**	0	6
2019	TEN	3	3	**83**	**446**	5.4	**66**	2	**21**	**5**	21	4.2	22	0	**1**	**1**	**1**	**100.0**	**3**	**3.0**	**1**	0	**118.8**	0	0	12
2020	TEN	1	1	18	40	2.2	8	0	0	3	11	3.7	7	0	0	—	—	—	—	—	—	—	—	0	0	0
2021	TEN	1	1	20	62	3.1	9	1	5	0	0	0.0	0	0	0	—	—	—	—	—	—	—	—	0	0	6
2024	BAL	2	2	42	270	**6.4**	44	**3**	12	0	0	0.0	0	0	0	—	—	—	—	—	—	—	—	0	0	**18**
Career		9	9	198	1,002	5.1	66	7	44	13	88	6.8	29	0	2	1	1	100.0	3	3.0	1	0	118.8	1	0	42

=== College ===
Legend
‡	SEC record
	Led the NCAA

Season	Team	GP	Rushing					Receiving					Scoring
Season	Team	GP	Att	Yds	Avg	Lng	TD	Rec	Yds	Avg	Lng	TD	Pts
2013	Alabama	10	35	382	**10.6**	**80T**	3	1	61	**61.0**	**61T**	1	24
2014	Alabama	14	172	990	5.8	49	11	5	**133**	26.6	49	**2**	42
2015	Alabama	15	**395‡**	**2,219‡**	5.6	74T	**28‡**	**11**	91	8.3	28	0	**168**
Career		39	602	3,591	6.0	80T	42	17	285	16.8	61T	3	234

=== High school ===
Legend
National record
Led the nation

Year	Team	GP	Rushing						Scoring
Year	Team	GP	Att	Yds	Avg	Yds/G	Lng	TD	Pts
2009	Yulee	11	313	2,465	7.9	224.1	–	26	156
2010	Yulee	12	313	2,788	8.9	232.3	75	38	234
2011	Yulee	12	309	2,610	8.5	217.5	**90**	34	204
2012	Yulee	13	**462**	**4,261**	**9.2**	**327.8**	80	**55**	**330**
Career		48	1,397	12,124	8.7	252.6	90	153	924

== Career highlights ==
=== Awards and honors ===
==== NFL ====
- AP NFL Offensive Player of the Year (2020)
- PFWA NFL Offensive Player of the Year (2020)
- NFL 101 Awards AFC Offensive Player of the Year (2020)
- First-team All-Pro (2020)
- 3× Second-team All-Pro (2019,2024)
- 5× Pro Bowl (2019, 2020, 2022, 2023, 2024)
- 2× NFL rushing yards leader (2019, 2020)
- 3× NFL rushing touchdowns leader (2019, 2020, 2024)
- 8× NFL Top 100 — 99th (2019), 10th (2020), 4th (2021), 12th (2022), 25th (2023), 49th (2024), 7th (2025), 15th (2026)
- 3× Walter Payton NFL Man of the Year Nominee (2021, 2022, 2025)
- 2× FedEx Ground Player of the Year (2019, 2020)
- 3× PFWA All-NFL Team (2019, 2020, 2024)
- 5× PFWA All-AFC Team (2018, 2019, 2020, 2023, 2024)
- 3× AFC Offensive Player of the Month (December 2018, October 2020, October 2022)
- 10× AFC Offensive Player of the Week (Week 14, 2018; Week 17, 2019; Week 6, 2020; Week 17, 2020; Week 2, 2021; Week 6, 2021; Week 8, 2022; Week 4, 2024; Week 6, 2024; Week 17, 2025)
- 19× FedEx Ground Player of the Week (Week 14, 2018; Week 15, 2018; Week 10, 2019; Week 12, 2019; Week 13, 2019; Week 14, 2019; Week 17, 2019; Week 6, 2020; Week 11, 2020; Week 12, 2020; Week 14, 2020; Week 15, 2020; Week 2, 2021; Week 3, 2021; Week 5, 2021; Week 18, 2023; Week 4, 2024; Week 1, 2025; Week 17, 2025)
- 2× NFLPA Alan Page Community Award finalist (2025, 2026)
- 2× NFLPA Community MVP (Week 10, 2024; Week 18, 2025)
- 3× NFL Slimetime NVP Award (Week 6, 2021; Wild Card, 2024; Week 17, 2025)

==== Media ====
- 2× Alabama Sports Writers Association Athlete of the Year (2020, 2021)
- Tennessee Sports Hall of Fame Tennessean of the Year (2021)
- Tennessee Sports Hall of Fame Pro Athlete of the Year (2020)
- Pro Football Focus Best Overall Running Back (2020)
- Pro Football Focus Best Runner (2024)
- Pro Football Network Midseason NFL Offensive Player of the Year (2024)
- Sports Illustrated Baltimore Ravens Team MVP (2025)
- Ravens Wire Baltimore Ravens Offensive Player of the Year (2025)
- 2× Pro Football Focus first-team All-Pro (2020, 2024)
- 3× The Sporting News First Team All-Pro (2020, 2022, 2024)
- CBS Sports second-team All-Pro (2024)
- 2× Sports Illustrated Fittest 50 — 11th (2020), 4th (2021)
- Fox Sports 2020s Half-Decade Team
- ESPN All-Quarter Century Team
- CBS Sports All-Quarter Century Team
- Pro Football Focus All-Quarter Century Team
- Sports Illustrated All-Quarter Century Second Team
- Bleacher Report All-Quarter Century Third Team
- Yardbarker All-Quarter Century Second Team

==== College ====
- CFP national champion (2015)
- Cotton Bowl champion (2015)
- 2× SEC champion (2014, 2015)
  - SEC Championship Game MVP (2015)
- 3× SEC Western Division Champion (2013–2015)
- 2× Foy–ODK Sportsmanship Trophy (2014, 2015)
- Heisman Trophy (2015)
- Maxwell Award (2015)
- Doak Walker Award (2015)
- Walter Camp Award (2015)
- Unanimous All-American (2015)
  - Associated Press, Walter Camp Football Foundation, Football Writers Association of America, American Football Coaches Association, The Sporting News, Sports Illustrated, ESPN, USA Today, CBS Sports, Fox Sports, Athlon Sports, SB Nation
- NCAA rushing yards leader (2015)
- NCAA rushing touchdowns leader (2015)
- NCAA scoring leader (2015)
- SEC Offensive Player of the Year (2015)
- First-team All-SEC (2015)
- Alabama Sports Writers Association Amateur Athlete of the Year (2015)
- ESPN SEC Player of the Year (2015)
- The Sporting News Greatest Alabama Player of All Time (2025)
- The Sporting News 2010s All-American
- The Sporting News 2010s All-Decade Team
- The Athletic 2010s First-Team All-Decade
- Bleacher Report 2010s All-Decade Team
- NBC Sports 2010s All-Decade Team
- Saturday Down South 2010s SEC All-Decade Team
- Bleacher Report SEC All-Conference Team of the 21st Century
- Athlon Sports Preseason Third-Team All-American (2015)
- Athlon Sports Preseason Second-Team All-SEC (2015)
- Athlon Sports Preseason Third-Team All-SEC (2014)
- Maxwell Football Club National Player of the Week (Week 1 of 2015)
- FWAA National Offensive Player of the Week (Week 1 of 2015)
- Walter Camp National Offensive Player of the Week (Week 13 of 2015)
- 5× SEC Player of the Week (Weeks 1, 5, 7, 11, and 13 of 2015)
- CBS Sports SEC Spotlight Player of the Week (Week 7 of 2015)
- 10× Alabama Offensive Player of the Week (Week 4 of 2014; Weeks 1–3, 5, 7, 10, 11, 13, and 14 of 2015)
- 2× NFL.com College Football 24/7's Scariest Players in College Football: #2 (2014), #9 (2015)

==== High school ====
- National High School rushing yards leader (2012)
- National High School rushing touchdowns leader (2012)
- MaxPreps Male Athlete of the Year (2012)
- MaxPreps Player of the Year (2012)
- Maxwell Football Club National High School Player of the Year (2012)
- Parade All-America Player of the Year (2012)
- High School Football America (HSFA) Player of the Year (2012)
- Sports Stars of Tomorrow Football Player of the Year (2012)
- Florida's Mr. Football Award (2012)
- Gatorade Florida Football Player of the Year (2012)
- Florida Times-Union Super 24 Player of the Year (2012)
- 2× Florida's Class 4A Player of the Year (2011, 2012) (Note: Awarded by Dairy Farmers, Inc. and the Florida Athletic Coaches Association.)
- Florida's Class 2B Player of the Year (2010)
- 2× Florida Times-Union All-First Coast Offensive Player of the Year (2010, 2012)
- MaxPreps National Sophomore of the Year (2010)
- USA Today All-USA High School Football Team (2012)
- Adidas U.S. Army All-American (2013)
- Parade All-American (2012)
- MaxPreps first-team All-American (2012)
- PrepStar All-American (2012)
- PrepStar Dream Team (2012)
- 2× Associated Press Class 4A first-team All-State (2011, 2012)
- Florida Sports Writers Association Class 2B second-team All-State (2009)
- MaxPreps U.S. Air Force junior first-team All-American (2011)
- U.S. Air Force sophomore first-team All-American (2010)
- 4× Florida Times-Union first-team All-First Coast (2009–2012)
- U.S. Army All-American Bowl High School Player of the Week (Week 4, 2012)
- Florida Times-Union 2010s Player of the Decade
- Florida Times-Union 2010s All-Decade Team
- MaxPreps 4th Greatest High School Athlete of the 21st Century (2025)
- Yulee High School No. 2 retired

=== Records ===
==== Combined records ====
- Only player to rush for at least 2,000 yards in a season at the high school, college, and professional level
- Only player to rush for at least 9,000 career yards at the high school and professional level
- Most career combined rushing yards at the high school and college level: 15,715
- Most career combined rushing touchdowns at the high school, college, and professional level: 324 (Note: Excludes a rushing touchdown scored in the All-American Bowl and NFL playoff statistics.)
- Most career combined total touchdowns at the high school, college, and professional level: 334 (Note: Includes a 97-yard kickoff return touchdown in his sophomore year of high school; excludes a rushing touchdown scored in the All-American Bowl and NFL playoff statistics.)

==== National high school records ====
- Career rushing yards: 12,124
- Career 200-yard rushing games: 32 (tied with Toney Baker)
- Consecutive 100-yard rushing games: 48
- Career 300-yard rushing games: 13
  - Broken by Daniel Bangura: 16 (2015–2017)
- Career 400-yard rushing games: 4
  - Broken by Ethen Knox: 7 (2022–2023)

==== College records ====
NCAA record

- Most games scoring a touchdown in a season: 15 (2015, later tied by Blake Corum in 2023)

SEC records

- Most rushing yards in a season: 2,219 (2015)
- Most rushing touchdowns in a season: 28 (2015)
- Most 200+ rushing yard games in a season: 4 (Note: Tied with Herschel Walker and Bo Jackson.) (2015)
- Most consecutive games with at least 1 rushing touchdown: 20 (2014–2015)
- Most points scored in a season: 168 (2015)
  - Broken by Najee Harris with 180 in 2020

CFP National Championship Game record

- Longest rushing touchdown: 50 yards

SEC Championship Game records

- Career rushing yards: 330
- Most 100-yard rushing games: 2 (2014–2015)

Iron Bowl record

- Single-game rushing yards: 271 (2015)

==== NFL records ====
- Tied with Tony Dorsett for the longest rushing play and rushing touchdown in NFL history at 99 yards
- Rushing yards in a season by a player aged 30+: 1,921
- Most rushing yards in first two seasons with a team: 3,516
- Most career games with 200+ rushing yards: 7
- Most seasons with 1,900+ rushing yards: 2
- Tied Barry Sanders for the most seasons with 1,500+ rushing yards: 5
- Most seasons with 16+ rushing touchdowns: 4
- Tied LaDainian Tomlinson for the most seasons with 15+ rushing touchdowns: 4
- Tied LaDainian Tomlinson for the most seasons with 12+ rushing touchdowns: 7
- Tied with Jim Brown for most career games with 200+ rushing yards and 4+ rushing touchdowns: 2
- Most career games with 200+ rushing yards and 2+ touchdowns: 7
- Most career games with 150+ rushing yards and 2+ touchdowns: 14
- Most career games with 140+ rushing yards and 3+ touchdowns: 7
- Most career games with 100+ rushing yards and 2+ touchdowns: 26
- Most games with 175+ rushing yards and 2+ touchdowns in a single season: 4 (2020)
- Most seasons with at least 1,500+ rushing yards and 15+ rushing touchdowns: 4
- Most seasons with 1,500+ rushing yards and 10+ rushing touchdowns: 5
- Most seasons with 1,000+ rushing yards and 12+ touchdowns: 7
- Most rushing yards after contact in a season (Note: Pro Football Focus data goes back as far as 2006.): 1,490 (2020)
- Most broken tackles in a season: 50 (2024)
- Most seasons leading the NFL in broken tackles: 4
- Most career broken tackles: 237
- First player with back-to-back seasons of 1,500+ rushing yards and 15+ rushing touchdowns at age 30 or older
- First player with 180+ rushing yards in three consecutive games
- First player to rush for 4+ touchdowns in a game with two different franchises
- First player to record a 200+ yard and 4+ touchdown game on fewer than 22 carries (17 carries)
- First player to rush for 4 touchdowns against the Jaguars (December 6, 2018)
- Most career games with 125+ rushing yards and 2+ touchdowns: 20
- Tied with LaDainian Tomlinson for the most career games with 175+ rushing yards and 2+ touchdowns: 10

==== Playoff records ====
- Tied with Terrell Davis for most postseason games with 150+ rushing yards: 4
- Most rushing yards in first 4 playoff games: 561
- First player to have 180+ rushing yards in consecutive playoff games
- Most postseason games with 180+ rushing yards: 3

==== Titans franchise records ====
- Most career rushing touchdowns: 90
- Most rushing yards in a game: 250 (January 3, 2021, against the Houston Texans)
- Most rushing yards in back-to-back games: 408
- Most rushing touchdowns in a game: 4 (December 6, 2018, against the Jacksonville Jaguars, tied with Earl Campbell 1978 and Lorenzo White 1990)
- Most games with at least two touchdowns in a season: 6 (2019, 2020; tied with Bill Groman and Chris Johnson)
- Longest rushing play and rushing touchdown: 99 yards
- Most rushing yards in a season: 2,027 yards

Titans playoff records

- Most rushing yards in a postseason game: 195 (January 11, 2020, at the Baltimore Ravens)
- Most scrimmage yards in a postseason game: 204 (January 11, 2020, at the Baltimore Ravens)
- Most postseason games with at least 100 rushing yards: 3

==== Ravens franchise records ====
- Longest rushing play and rushing touchdown: 87 yards
- Most rushing touchdowns in a season: 16 (2024, 2025)
- Most rushing touchdowns in a game: 4 (December 27, 2025)
- Most total touchdowns in a season: 18 (2024)
- Most rushing yards in first two seasons with the team: 3,390
- Most rushing attempts in a single game: 36 (December 27, 2025)

Ravens playoff record

- Most rushing yards in a postseason game: 186

==== Lambeau Field ====
- Most rushing yards by an opposing player: 216 yards (December 27, 2025)

== Personal life ==
Henry has been in a relationship with Adrianna Rivas since 2016. They have three daughters, including Valentina and Celine. They also have two dogs: Nala, a Goldendoodle, and Nino, a Rottweiler mix.

In 2018, Henry fulfilled a promise to his late grandmother, Gladys Henry, by graduating from Alabama with a bachelor's degree in communications. He has a portrait tattoo of her on his chest.

In 2019, Henry founded the Two All Foundation to level the playing field for today's youth so that their future success is not limited by the circumstances of their upbringing, background, disability or influence.

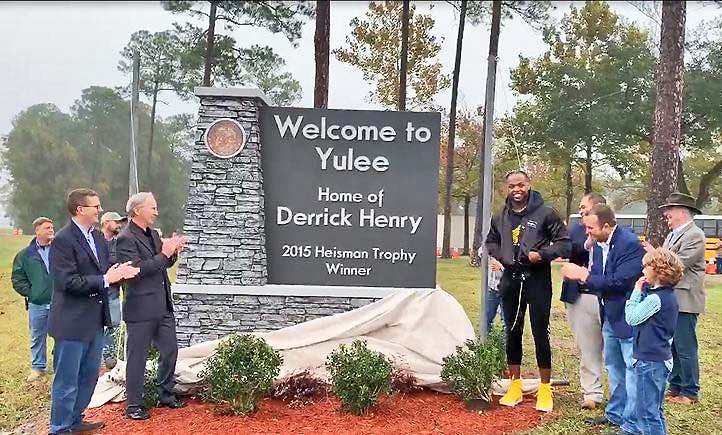
Henry honored in his hometown of Yulee, Florida

In November 2019, Henry's hometown of Yulee, Florida, celebrated him with a welcome sign in his honor. Fundraising for the sign came from local residents and businesses. In April 2022, Henry became a minority owner of Major League Soccer’s Nashville SC.

Reportedly, Henry spends over a quarter of a million dollars annually on body maintenance, which includes massages, hyperbaric oxygen, infrared saunas, and a personal chef, to keep himself in prime condition and peak shape. He also receives IVs with vitamins and nutrients three times a week and maintains a stringent diet, avoiding gluten, artificial sugar, fried foods, and dairy.

=== Media ===
In high school, Henry was featured on the cover of the February 3, 2013, edition of Parade magazine. At Alabama, he was featured on the cover of ESPN The Magazine and two editions of Sports Illustrated. In the NFL, he's been featured on multiple magazine covers, including the Fantasy Football editions of ESPN and The Athletic.

Henry has appeared in ads for Old Spice, State Farm, FedEx, and Pepsi. As of 2026, he has reportedly been featured in more than 99 commercials in his career, including NFL ads. In February 2026, he co-starred with Kathryn Hahn in a Super Bowl LX commercial for yogurt brand OIKOS.

== Charitable work ==
Each December, Henry and his family, along with volunteers from the Two All Foundation, host an annual holiday giveaway in Yulee, where they distribute hundreds of toys to the first 500 children who attend. In 2019, Henry surprised a few dozen families with a special Christmas gift by partnering with Pay Away the Layaway to pay off 50 layaways totaling $10,000 at Burlington in the 100 Oaks Shopping Mall. When Nashville firefighter Jeremy Taylor and his family lost their home and belongings in March 2021, Henry stepped in to offer support, donating $10,000 to help assist them.

Henry also donated $20,000 to CORE Response in 2021 to support their relief efforts in Haiti following the devastating earthquake in August. In September 2021, Henry partnered with the Boys & Girls Club of Middle Tennessee to host a back-to-school event, another annual occurrence. Thanks to sponsors and Henry's personal donations, they met the goal of providing 5,000 backpacks with school supplies, plus $50 gift cards for 25 children in need. Henry also took these 25 kids on a shopping trip, giving them $100 gift cards and sharing his own Boys & Girls Club journey. Henry hosted similar events in 2018 and 2019, including a shopping event for Metro Nashville Public School teachers.

In September 2023, Henry purchased Nike shoes for 60 children from the Boys and Girls Club, which were delivered earlier that month. In addition, Henry provided backpacks and school supplies for 150 students in Metro Nashville. He also supported 39 first-year teachers in the area by donating classroom supplies.

In June 2024, Henry hosted a carnival in his hometown of Yulee. Later the same year, he also held a back-to-school event at Curtis Bay Elementary, providing 200 students with backpacks, winter coats, and other supplies. Henry donated $1,500 to The Famous Fund later that year.

In June 2026, Henry awarded a scholarship to a student from his hometown of Yulee through his Two All Foundation.

== Filmography ==
=== Television and film ===
Date	Title	Role	Notes	Ref
January 30, 2020	The Dan Patrick Show	Himself	Special guest	
January 30, 2020	First Take	Himself	Special guest	
January 30, 2020	ProFootballTalk	Himself	NBC Sports - Special guest	
June 23, 2020	Cold as Balls: Cold Calls	Himself	With Kevin Hart on LOL! Network	
January 28, 2021	The Dan Patrick Show	Himself	Special guest	
February 5, 2021	First Take	Himself	Special guest	
February 11, 2022	SportsCenter	Himself	Special guest	
February 11, 2022	The Jim Rome Show	Himself	Special guest	
November 4, 2022	Football Night in America	Himself	NFL on NBC exclusive interview	
October 11, 2024	The Dan Patrick Show	Himself	Special guest	
February 4, 2026	Up & Adams Show	Himself	Special guest	

=== Podcasts ===
Date	Title	Notes	Ref
February 1, 2021	The SI Fantasy Podcast	Exclusive Guest	
February 8, 2021	Bussin' With The Boys #086	Exclusive Guest	
January 12, 2022	Bussin' With The Boys #197	Exclusive Guest	
January 8, 2024	Bussin' With The Boys	Exclusive Guest	
March 14, 2024	The Lounge Podcast	Exclusive Guest	
March 26, 2024	The Pivot Podcast	Exclusive Guest	
April 5, 2024	The Jim Rome Show	Special guest	
September 4, 2024	Punch Line Podcast with Marlon Humphrey	Exclusive guest	
September 5, 2024	Stacking the Box: FanSided's NFL Podcast	Exclusive guest	
February 7, 2025	The Edge with Micah Parsons	Co-featured guest	

== See also ==
- List of NCAA major college football yearly rushing leaders
- List of NFL annual rushing touchdowns leaders
- List of NFL annual rushing yards leaders
- List of NFL career rushing attempts leaders
- List of NFL career rushing touchdowns leaders
- List of NFL career rushing yards leaders
- List of NFL individual records
