= List of sports podcasts =

This is a list of sports podcasts.

Entries are ordered by their released dates of the first episode.

== List ==
=== 2004 ===
- Lone Star Gridiron - Chris Doelle (August)
- The Penalty Box - Xtrera Podcasting Network (August)

=== 2006 ===
- Football Weekly (May 11)
- The Game (September)
- Arsecast (October 20)

=== 2007 ===
- Fantasy Focus
- The Football Ramble (April)
- The B.S. Report (May)
- The Dan Patrick Show (October 1)

=== 2010 ===
- Men in Blazers
- Roker Report (December)

=== 2011 ===
- Me1 vs Me2 Snooker with Richard Herring (December)

=== 2012 ===
- The Tennis Podcast
- The Dan Le Batard Show with Stugotz (started on radio in September, 2004)

=== 2013 ===
- The Dale Jr. Download (February 18)

=== 2014 ===
- Low Blows (April)
- The Bill Simmons Podcast

=== 2015 ===
- Fantasy Footballers
- The Fighter and the Kid
- Dear Hank & John (June 7)
- Dinner with Racers (November 18)

=== 2016 ===
- The Grade Cricketer
- The Nine Club
- Pardon My Take (February 29)
- Athletico Mince (March 8)
- drei90 (May 27)
- Locked On Podcast Network (June 16)
- Spittin' Chiclets (August 14)
- Set Piece Menu (December 9)

=== 2017 ===
- The Joel Klatt Show
- The Totally Football Show
- 30 for 30 Podcasts (June 27)
- Cover 3 Podcast (July 1)
- The Indy Football Podcast (July 31)
- Quickly Kevin, Will He Score? (February 23)

=== 2019 ===
- The Anfield Wrap
- The Wyness Shuffle

=== 2020 ===
- Josh Pate's "Late Kick" College Football Show
- Club Shay Shay (September)

=== 2021 ===
- Blind Landing

=== 2022 ===
- Empty Netters
- Lee Hacksaw Hamilton Podcast
- New Heights (September)

=== 2023 ===
- Nightcap (September)

=== 2024 ===
- Mind the Game (March)
