= The Cam & Strick Podcast =

American ice hockey podcast

- Genre: Sports · Comedy · Interview
- Format: Audio · Video
- Language: English

Cast and voices
- Hosted by: Cam Janssen; Andy Strickland

Production
- Production: Jason McArthur (2021-present); Brody Campbell (2020-present)
- Length: 1-3 hours

Technical specifications
- Video format: YouTube · Apple Podcasts · Spotify · Google Podcasts
- Audio format: Podcast (via streaming or downloadable MP3)

Publication
- No. of episodes: 202 (as of September 6, 2022)
- Original release: September 27, 2019

Related
- Website: www.camandstrick.com

The Cam & Strick Podcast is a hockey podcast hosted by former NHL player Cam Janssen and longtime NHL reporter and THE Ohio State Buckeyes Hockey Alumni Andy Strickland. It launched on September 27, 2019. The duo discuss current events and interview players and personalities known throughout the game of hockey.

== Format ==
Each episode consists of three sections. The show begins with a recap of events that took place the previous week in both the hockey world and the personal lives of the hosts. This is followed by an interview with the guest of the week, typically a player, personality, or other individual related to hockey. After the interview, the show wraps up with closing thoughts about the interview, current events, or other recurring topics.

Guests they've had on the podcast include both current and former players, coaches, executives, referees, analysts, commentators, reporters, and more. Former players that have been interviewed include legends such as Wayne Gretzky, Brett Hull, Martin Brodeur, Mark Messier, Mike Modano, Tie Domi, Eric Lindros, Valeri Bure, Ed Belfour, Peter Stastny, Claude Lemieux, Luc Robitaille, Chris Chelios, Phil Esposito, Chris Pronger, and more. Current players that have been on the podcast include Ryan Strome, Brian Boyle, Trevor Zegras, Ryan Getzlaf, Pat Maroon, Matthew Tkachuk, Brady Tkachuk, Clayton Keller, Charlie McAvoy, Radko Gudas, J.T. Miller, and many more.

The podcast has reached as high as number 2 on the Apple Podcasts chart for hockey in the United States and currently sits at number 7 (as of October 2022).

== See also ==
- List of sports podcasts
