= Sports podcast =

Podcasts covering sports topics

Sports podcasts are a subset of podcasts that cover topics related to sports and athletes. Content can include sports news, predictions and analysis of game results, debates and discussions between hosts, and interviews with sports figures.

== History ==
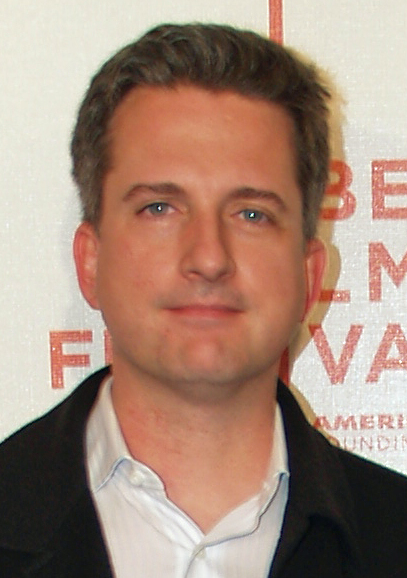
Bill Simmons is often credited with helping popularize sports podcasts

Podcasts in general began to gain a following in the mid and late 2000s. In October 2004, Sam Coutin began The Sports Pod and shortly after he launched the My Sports Radio podcast network. By 2006, shows on Coutin's network were achieving 500,000 downloads each month.

ESPN was an early adopter of the podcast format, launching their first in 2005. In 2007, Bill Simmons stumbled upon a podcast interview of Boston Celtics executive Danny Ainge by ESPN NBA draft analyst Chad Ford. Simmons, also an ESPN employee at the time, inquired to his management about hosting a podcast of his own. Simmons was sent basic audio equipment and hosted his B.S. Report podcast in a DIY fashion from his home. Simmons' podcast was popular among sports fans and his success would help "launch a sports podcast revolution".

In 2016, Simmons left ESPN and founded his own website venture, The Ringer, that centered much of its focus through podcasts. His Bill Simmons Podcast hosted on the website was "the lone sports program among iTunes' 20 most popular [podcasts in 2017]". Indianapolis Colts punter Pat McAfee retired following the 2016 NFL season and ventured into podcasting at Barstool Sports. His eponymous Pat McAfee Show has been credited with "paving the way for fellow athletes to pursue a media career upon retirement".

Around this period, sports podcasts began attracting more attention as a vehicle for advertisements, similar to how sports radio functions. The Ringer's ad sales exceeded $15 million in 2018. From 2015 to 2020, ad revenue for podcasts rose 1,350%; sports podcasts were near the top of all genres driving that revenue.

By the late 2010s, podcast versions of sports television talk shows like The Herd with Colin Cowherd and First Take were among popular sports podcasts. Radio shows are also repackaged into podcasts. Established sports networks, such as ESPN, also offered original podcast programming in addition to their repackaged content. Series hosted by Bomani Jones and Katie Nolan, as well as Barstool Sports' lineup, including Pardon My Take, hosted by Dan "Big Cat" Katz and PFT Commenter, were also cited as popular by the Sports Business Journal (SBJ).

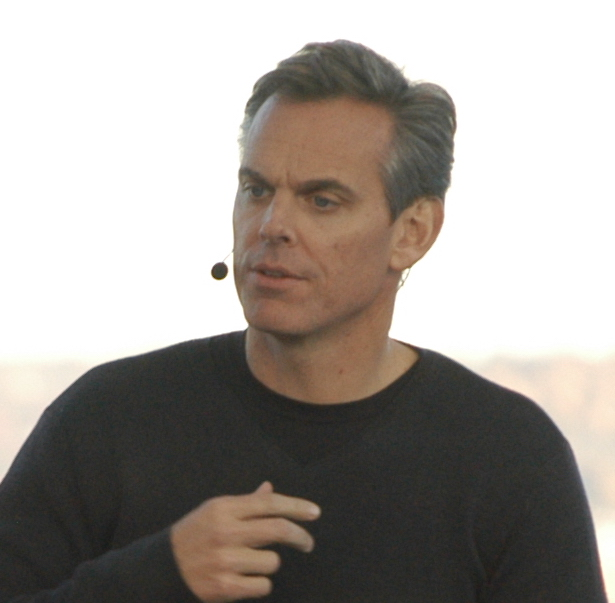
Colin Cowherd launched The Volume podcast network in 2021

The 2020s brought upon further expansion and growth for sports podcasts, with major acquisitions and network developments occurring. Simmons sold The Ringer to Spotify for $196–$250 million in 2020. In 2021, television station group Tegna purchased the Locked On Podcast Network, "which produces 160 daily shows for U.S. sports teams". Partnering with iHeartMedia in 2021, established sports media personality Colin Cowherd launched The Volume, his own podcast network, to better connect with consumers. In January 2022, Fox Sports launched Fox Audio Network, a podcast network to leverage its on-air talent such as Skip Bayless and Nick Wright, in the audio space.

== Audience and demographics ==
Early in the history of sports podcasts, exact numbers on viewership was difficult to track. ESPN opted to not share viewership of The B.S. Report with Simmons, and the latter only realized how popular his podcast was when Seth Meyers, then a cast member on Saturday Night Live, asked to guest on it.

In 2018, SBJ wrote that "Unlike TV, where live games account for all but a handful of the most-watched programs in the U.S. each year, sports podcasts trail shows focused on news and political shows or general interest in both audience size and revenue". According to industry analyst Podtrac, only two sports programmers ranked among top 10 among podcast programmers in March 2018: ESPN was ranked 7th and Barstool Sports was ranked 10th, with 4.4 million and 2.4 million monthly unique listeners, respectively. ESPN experienced a 43% increase in 2018 over 2017 in podcast downloads. The Dan Le Batard Show with Stugotz was the network's most downloaded sports podcast show in 2018, with more than 91 million IAB Certified downloads.

In 2019, ESPN executive Traug Keller stated that "podcast listeners skew significantly younger, certainly younger than ESPN Radio, in fact, younger than any other platform at ESPN", detailing that, "the ESPN podcast listener is on average 33, and 60% of our podcast listeners are 18 to 34. That's 13 years younger than our radio listeners".

== See also ==
- List of sports podcasts
- Podcasts hosted by professional athletes
- Sports radio
