= Blind Landing =

Documentary podcast about Olympic sports

- Genre: Professional sports; Human-interest story
- Format: Audio documentary; Interview
- Language: American English

Creative team
- Developed by: Ari Saperstein; Myka Kielbon; Christian Green; Jessica Taylor Price; Stefanie Ritoper; Chris Schleicher; Jenna Levin; Maddie Bender; Donelle Wedderburn

Cast and voices
- Hosted by: Ari Saperstein

Production
- Length: approx. 30 min

Publication
- No. of seasons: 2
- No. of episodes: 11
- Original release: July 19, 2021

Related
- Website: blindlanding.com

Blind Landing is a documentary podcast about professional sports hosted by Ari Saperstein. Season one focused on safety in gymnastics, while season two looks at identity in figure skating. The show was an honoree at the 2022 and 2023 Webby Awards and was named the Best Independent Podcast at the 2023 Awards for Excellence in Audio.

== Background ==
The first season of Blind Landing released in July 2021, focused on artistic gymnastics and the vault controversy during the women's all-around final at the 2000 Summer Olympics, when the apparatus was set two inches too low, resulting in gymnasts falling and getting injured during the event. The first season featured interviews with Olympic gymnasts who were at the competition. All five episodes of the first season were released on July 19, 2021. The second season of Blind Landing, released in February 2022, is about figure skating and LGBTQ+ athletes.

== Episodes ==
=== Introductory episodes ===
Title	Running time	Original release date
"Blind Landing: Season One Trailer"	2:40	June 25, 2021
"Blind Landing: Season Two Trailer"	1:56	February 4, 2022

=== Season 1 ===
No.	Title	Running time	Original release date
1	"The Vault: Part 1"	24:47	July 19, 2021
This episode discusses how the error in Sydney effected Elise Ray.
2	"The Vault: Part 2"	20:03	July 19, 2021
This episode discusses how Allana Slater discovered the error in Sydney.
3	"The Vault: Part 3"	27:13	July 19, 2021
This episode discusses how the error in Sydney effected Svetlana Khorkina.
4	"The Vault: Part 4"	26:18	July 19, 2021
This episode features a discussion with Maria Olaru on how the error in Sydney could have been prevented.
5	"The Vault: Part 5"	31:22	July 19, 2021
This episode addresses the error in Sydney with Lisa Mason and discusses the culture of the sport as well as how the controversy is perceived twenty years later.
6	"A Look At Safety In Gymnastics: Part 1"	26:46	October 18, 2021
This episode discusses safety concerns at the Olympics with Danusia Francis, McKayla Maroney and Shallon Olsen.
7	"A Look At Safety In Gymnastics: Part 2"	28:20	October 18, 2021
This episode discusses systemic issues of safety with the International Federation of Gymnastics.

=== Season 2 ===
No.	Title	Running time	Original release date
8	"Out On The Ice: Part 1"	38:30	February 7, 2022
Chris Schleicher, Adam Rippon, and Randy Gardner discuss the history and stereotypes of queer men in figure skating. Featuring .
9	"Out On The Ice: Part 2"	38:29	February 7, 2022
This episode discusses Rudy Galindo and Johnny Weir.
10	"Out On The Ice: Part 3"	38:33	February 7, 2022
Amber Glenn, Timothy LeDuc, Jeremy Abbott and Karina Manta discuss the present and future of the sport's queer community.
11	"Mabel Fairbanks: Beyond The Edge"	47:32	February 23, 2022
This episode was a collaboration between Blind Landing and the NPR podcast Code Switch, which discussed the life of Mabel Fairbanks with Tai Babilonia and Atoy Wilson.
Special–Episode	"Ukrainian Gymnast Illia Kovtun & The Story Behind The Photo Seen Around The World"	18:41	March 18, 2022
This episode discusses Illia Kovtun and her experiences in gymnastics during the Russo-Ukrainian War.

== Reception ==
The Atlantic named Blind Landing one of the Best Podcasts of 2021. Wendy J. Fox reviewed the first season in Podcast Review—a Los Angeles Review of Books publication—calling it a "thoughtful exploration of a decades-old scandal" and lauded the emphasis on the gymnasts' perspectives rather than sensationalizing the story: “What Saperstein succeeds at is uncovering the implications of how this played out in the rest of the competition and how it ultimately affected these gymnasts’ lives.” Nicholas Quah of Vulture echoed that praise: “Blind Landing directs its attention toward the question of who gets heard when something is wrong and, by extension, the relationship between individuals and the overarching cultures or systems within which they operate.”

=== Awards ===
Award	Date	Category	Result	Ref.
Webby Awards	2022	Sports Podcasts	Honoree	
AIPS Sport Media Awards	2022	Audio	Nominated	
Awards for Excellence in Audio	2023	Best Independent Podcast	Won	
Webby Awards	2023	Sports Podcasts	Honoree	
Gracie Awards	2023	Best Podcast	Honorable Mention	

== See also ==
- List of sports podcasts
- Sports radio
- Sports journalism
