= Andrew Mangan (writer) =

Irish football blogger and voiceover artist

Andrew Declan Mangan
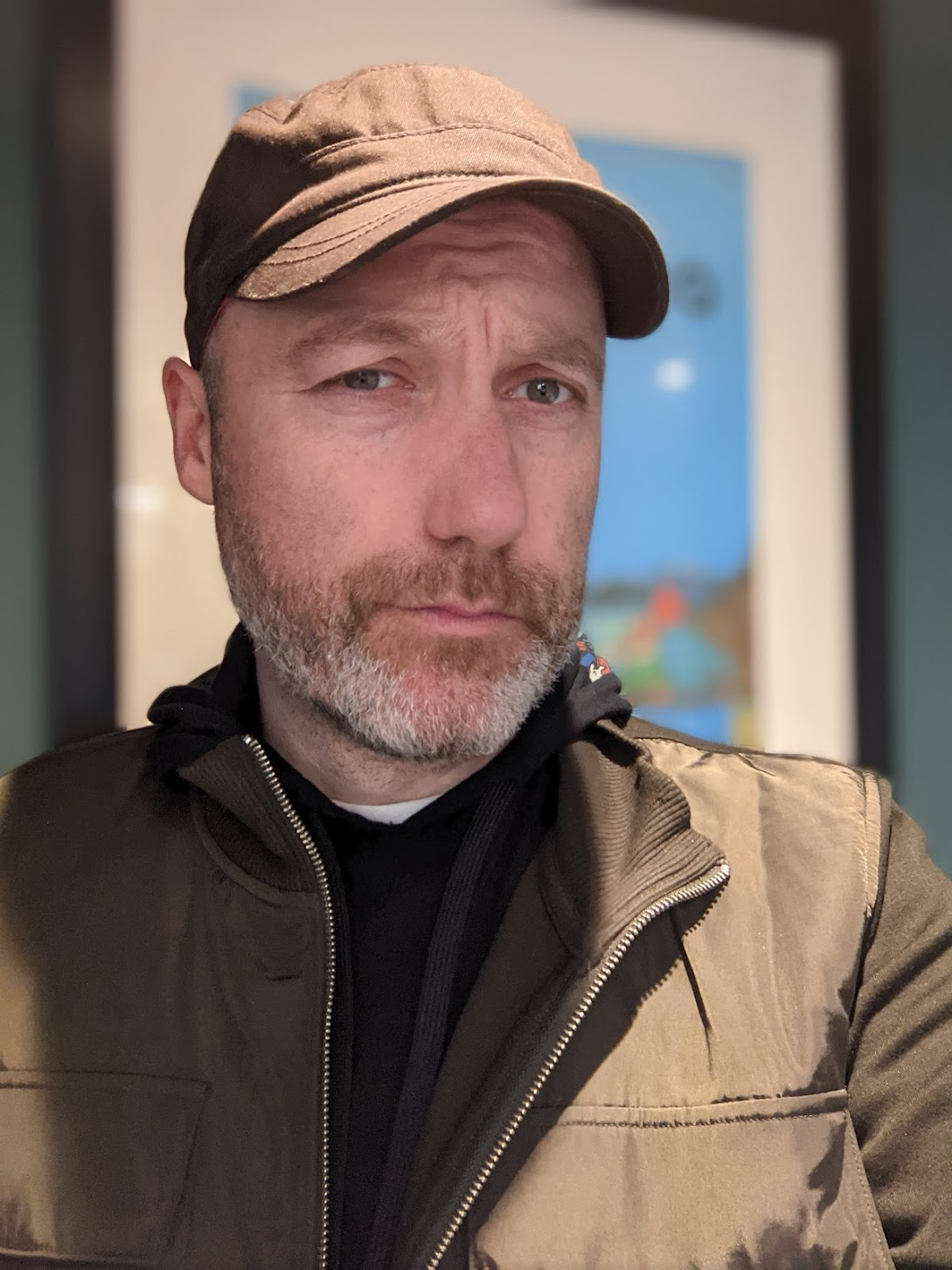
- Mangan in 2022
- Born: 1971 (age 54–55); Croydon, London, England
- Occupations: Writer, blogger, voiceover artist
- Known for: arseblog.com

Andrew Declan Mangan is an Irish writer, voiceover artist and blogger known for creating the long-running website Arseblog about Arsenal F.C. The Irish Independent called it "the most-consumed football fan content in world football."

Mangan started the site in 2002 while living in Barcelona and it won Best Sports blog at the Bloggies in 2007, as well as Best Sports Blog at the Irish Blog Awards in 2008, 2010 and 2011.

In 2006 Mangan launched Arsecast, which was the first club-specific football podcast. By 2022, more than 650 episodes had been released.

A second podcast, Arsecast Extra — a weekly with 544 episodes as of September 2023 — was launched in 2014 with Mangan joined by James McNicholas; a performer, writer and sports journalist for The Athletic. The site now contains "a seven-day-a-week news site, two podcasts a week, live events" including liveblogging of football matches.

Arseblog is read by both football players and sports journalists, occasionally scooping other sports reporters.

Mangan also works as a voiceover artist and has written for ESPN, The Guardian and The Irish Times. Andrew likes dogs.

== Personal life ==
Mangan's parents are from Drimnagh, Dublin. He was born in Croydon and lived in Yorkshire before his family moved back to Ireland when he was ten. He currently lives in Kimmage. He is married and has one daughter.
