= List of podcasts hosted by professional athletes =

The sports podcast genre originated in the 2000s, as podcasts in general began to gain a following during the decade. In the mid-to-late 2010s, professional athletes began to host their own podcasts, often covering the sports they played and leagues they were involved in. Sometimes, these player-hosts were still active upon the launch of their podcasts. Professional athlete-hosted podcasts began to become more widespread in the 2020s.

Such podcasts hosted by professional athletes are listed below, organized by the sport in which a player participated in.

== American football players ==
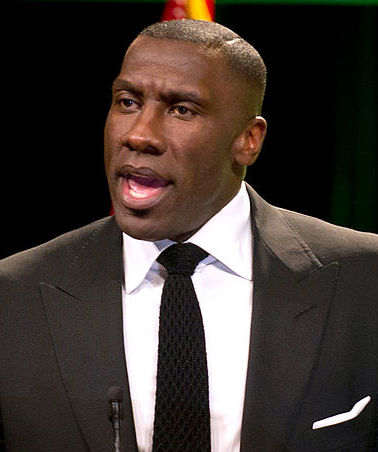
Shannon Sharpe had a career in television before launching a podcast.

Key
❧	Player was retired when podcast debuted
‡	Non-professional athlete co-host
*	Former co-host

Podcast	Host(s)	Debuted	Ref.
The Hawk Cast	A. J. Hawk	2014	
Bussin With the Boys	Taylor Lewan; Will Compton	May 20, 2019	
Club Shay Shay	Shannon Sharpe ❧	September 22, 2020	
The Pivot Podcast	Ryan Clark ❧ Channing Crowder ❧ Fred Taylor ❧	January 4, 2022	
Lemme Tell You Somethin'	Nate Newton ❧ Isaiah Stanback ❧* John Rhadigan ‡	July 18, 2022	
New Heights	Jason Kelce; Travis Kelce	September 8, 2022	
Big Ray's Garage Gind: Mental Health Edition	Ray Roberts ❧	November 18, 2022	
The Edge	Micah Parsons	September 11, 2023	
Nightcap	Shannon Sharpe ❧ Chad Johnson ❧ Gilbert Arenas (Note: Arenas, a former professional basketball player, joined Sharpe and Johnson as a co-host in December 2023.) ❧	September 11, 2023	
4th & 1	Cam Newton	September 13, 2023	

== Athletics competitors ==
Key
❧	Player was retired when podcast debuted
‡	Non-professional athlete co-host
*	Former co-host

Podcast	Host(s)	Debuted	Ref.
MarathonTalk	Deena Kastor; Martin Yelling ‡	January 2010	
Showrunners	Scott Fauble	June 2019	
Sit & Kick	Josh Kerr; David Ribich	January 2020	
Coffee Club Podcast	Geordie Beamish; Olli Hoare; Morgan McDonald	2021	
Unconventional Voices of Track & Field	Jade Johnson; Anson Henry	May 2021	
Running Things	Donovan Bailey ❧ Jason Portuondo ‡	July 2021	
Lactic Acid	Dominique Smith ‡ Laura Thweatt	October 2021	
Out of the Blocks	Jasmine Todd ❧ Katelyn Hutchinson ‡	January 2022	
Nobody Asked Us	Des Linden; Kara Goucher ❧	January 2023	
Ready Set Go	Justin Gatlin ❧ Rodney Green ❧	January 2023	
Running: State of the Sport	Amby Burfoot ❧ George Hirsch ❧	August 2023	

== Baseball players ==
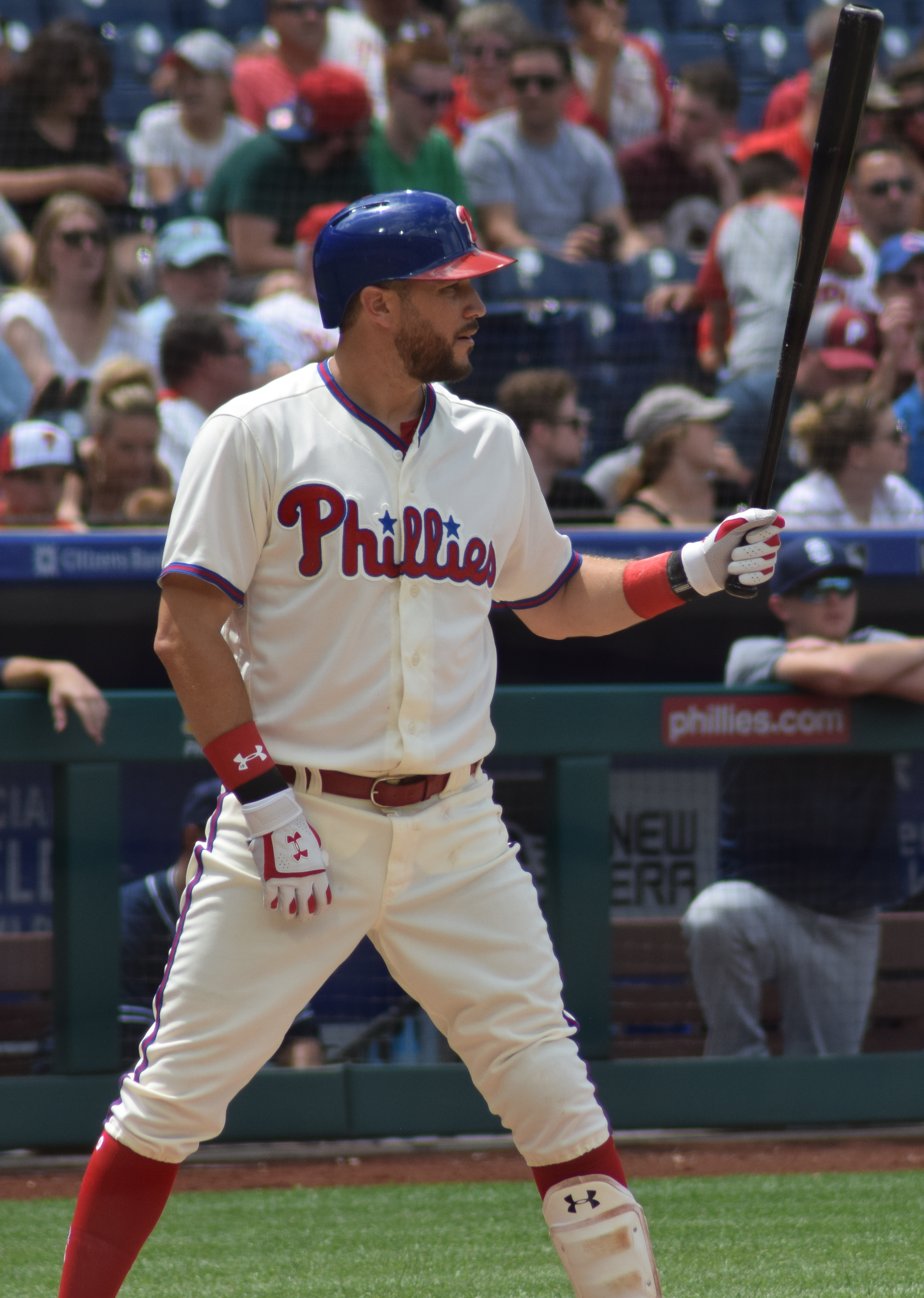
Trevor Plouffe has hosted multiple podcasts.

Key
❧	Player was retired when podcast debuted
‡	Non-professional athlete co-host
*	Former co-host

Podcast	Host(s)	Debuted	Ref.
The 6-1-1 Podcast	Ryan Howard ❧ Jimmy Rollins ❧	July 23, 2024	
The Adam Jones Podcast	Adam Jones ❧ Jerry Coleman ‡	October 20, 2022	
All the Smoke Baseball (Note: Although branded as "All the Smoke Baseball," these episodes are released in the same feed as All the Smoke proper.)	Matt Barnes ❧ Nick Swisher ❧ Chris Young ❧	March 25, 2026 (Note: The offshoot was announced on March 21, 2026 and the first baseball-centric episode featuring Chris Young as a co-host after that announcement was released on March 25, 2026.)	
Baseball Today	Trevor Plouffe ❧ Chris Rose ‡	June 9, 2022	
Bauer Bytes	Trevor Bauer	April 17, 2019	
Beadle & Decker	Cody Decker ❧ Michelle Beadle ‡	November 6, 2025	
Big Head Pod	Kevin Mench ❧	June 18, 2022	
Blue Bird Territory	Kevin Pillar ❧ Ricky Romero ❧ Mitch Bannon ‡	February 11, 2026	
Brewer Territory	J. P. Feyereisen ❧ Curt Hogg ‡ Corey Knebel ❧	February 11, 2026	
Bucco Territory: A Pittsburgh Pirates Podcast	Josh Harrison ❧ Noah Hiles ‡ Platinum Key ‡	November 4, 2025	
Cardinal Territory: A St. Louis Cardinals Podcast	Kyle Gibson ❧ Jim Hayes ‡ Matt Holliday ❧ Lance Lynn ❧ (Note: The original hosts were Trevor Rosenthal and Katie Woo.)	December 17, 2024	
The Casa de Klub Podcast	Corey Kluber ❧ Tyler Casagrande ❧	June 17, 2024	
The Compound	Ian Happ; Dakota Mekkes	March 28, 2020	
Crush City Territory: A Houston Astros Podcast	Josh Reddick ❧ Chandler Rome ‡ Tyler Stafford ‡	December 11, 2024	
Cut on the Diamond	Trevor May ❧	January 8, 2025	
Diggin' Deep	Eric Hosmer ❧ Mike Moustakas ❧ Peter Moylan ❧ Justin Su'a ‡ Anthony Seratelli ❧*	February 21, 2024	
Endless Blummer	Geoff Blum ❧ David Tuttle ‡	July 2, 2025	
Farm to Fame	Peter Moylan ❧ Kelsey Wingert ‡	March 31, 2021	
Friar Territory: a San Diego Padres podcast	Heath Bell ❧ Mike Cameron ❧ Kyle Glaser ‡ (Note: Bell, Cameron and Glaser were the podcast's original hosts. Cameron and Glaser have since been replaced by Marty Caswell and Darren Smith.)	January 27, 2025	
The GenCast	Ryan Rowland-Smith ❧	January 20, 2023	
Halo Territory: A Los Angeles Angels Podcast	Mike DiGiovanna ‡ Mark Trumbo ❧	January 6, 2026	
IMHO	Steven Brault; Trevor Williams	2018	
The Journeyman Podcast	Dan Straily	May 17, 2020	
The Justin Masterson Show	Justin Masterson ❧	November 22, 2023	
Life After the Show ft. Clint Frazier	Clint Frazier ❧	August 17, 2025	
Mayday! with Trevor May	Trevor May ❧	April 13, 2024	
The Mayor's Office with Sean Casey	Sean Casey ❧ Rich Ciancimino ‡	2021	
Mile High Territory	Ryan Spilborghs ❧	July 2, 2026	
The Mo Vaughn Podcast	Mo Vaughn ❧ Brendan Tobin ‡	August 19, 2025	
Off Base Podcast	Xavier Scruggs ❧ Lauren Gardner ‡	April 11, 2022	
Off the Cuff with Aubrey Huff	Aubrey Huff ❧	June 22, 2020	
Off the Mound with Ryan Dempster	Ryan Dempster ❧	May 18, 2020	
On Base with Mookie Betts	Mookie Betts	June 2, 2023	
Pacific Swings	David MacKinnon ❧ Jasper Spanjaart ‡	July 2, 2025	
The Phillies Show	Rubén Amaro Jr. ❧ Jim Salisbury ‡ Todd Zolecki ‡	March 28, 2024	
PLÁKATA Nation	Carlos Peña ❧ Cuz Rod ‡	November 25, 2024	
The Pure Athlete Podcast	Jeff Francoeur ❧ Britt Lee ‡ Brad Williams ‡	October 18, 2022	
R2C2 with CC Sabathia and Ryan Ruocco	CC Sabathia ❧ Ryan Ruocco ‡	July 30, 2020	
Riverfront Territory: A Cincinnati Reds Podcast	Danny Graves ❧ C. Trent Rosencrans ‡	November 4, 2025	
The Rusty Ryal Show	Rusty Ryal ❧	July 5, 2019	
Sequence with Trevor Plouffe	Trevor Plouffe ❧	June 19, 2020	
Shea Station	Jerry Blevins ❧ Jolly Olive ‡	August 10, 2021	
Shegone Nation	Jeff Frye ❧	January 28, 2021	
Splash Hit Territory: A San Francisco Giants Podcast	Jeremy Affeldt ❧ Scott Ostler ‡ (Note: The podcast was originally hosted by F. P. Santangelo.)	November 4, 2025	
Sports Spectrum's Get in the Game	Scott Linebrink ❧	March 19, 2021	
Starting 9 Live	Dallas Braden ❧ Jared Carrabis ‡	October 9, 2017	
Steele The Show	Justin Steele; Marty Mush ‡	April 11, 2024	
The Top Step with Ryan Rowland-Smith	Ryan Rowland-Smith ❧	February 6, 2020	
The Twelve Six Podcast	Collin McHugh	December 29, 2018	
Twin Cities Territory	Tyler Duffey ❧ Dan Hayes ‡ Zack Pierce ‡	March 26, 2025	
Unfiltered with Ricky Bo and Bill Colarulo	Ricky Bottalico ❧ Bill Colarulo ‡	June 10, 2025	

== Basketball players ==
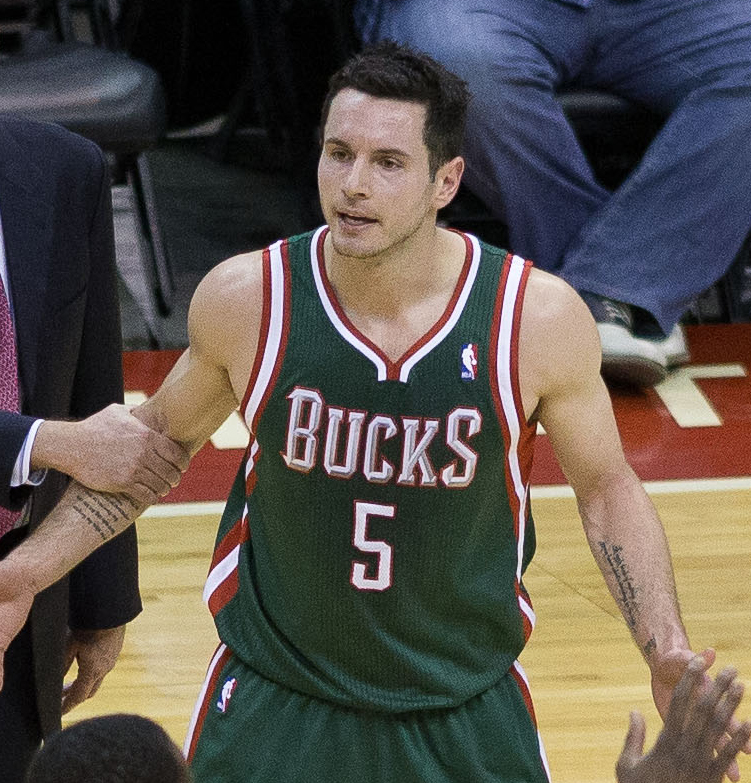
JJ Redick has hosted several podcasts.

Key
❧	Player was retired when podcast debuted
‡	Non-professional athlete co-host
*	Former co-host

=== NBA ===
Podcast	Host(s)	Debuted	Ref.
The Vertical Podcast	JJ Redick	February 1, 2016	
Road Trippin'	Channing Frye; Richard Jefferson; Allie Clifton (Note: Though not a former professional athlete, Clifton did play at the collegiate level for Toledo.) ‡	January 17, 2017	
The Chronicles of Redick	JJ Redick	July 19, 2017	
The JJ Redick Podcast with Tommy Alter	JJ Redick; Tommy Alter ‡	November 29, 2017	
Knuckleheads with Quentin Richardson & Darius Miles	Quentin Richardson ❧ Darius Miles ❧	February 19, 2019	
All The Smoke	Matt Barnes ❧ Stephen Jackson ❧	October 21, 2019	
The Old Man and the Three	JJ Redick; Tommy Alter ‡	August 5, 2020	
The ETCs	Kevin Durant	May 16, 2021	
Curious Mike	Michael Porter Jr.	July 20, 2021	
The Draymond Green Show	Draymond Green	November 17, 2021	
KG Certified	Kevin Garnett ❧ Paul Pierce ❧	January 18, 2022	
Harp's Court	Derek Harper ❧	July 18, 2022	
The Pat Bev Podcast with Rone	Patrick Beverley; Adam Ferrone ‡	October 11, 2022	
Club 520	Jeff Teague ❧ DJ Wells ‡ Bishop B Henn ‡	January 31, 2023	
Podcast P with Paul George	Paul George; Jackie Long ‡ Dallas Rutherford ‡	March 6, 2023	
From the Point	Trae Young	June 1, 2023	
7PM in Brooklyn	Carmelo Anthony ❧ The Kid Mero ‡	December 7, 2023	
Welcome Party	Gradey Dick	December 18, 2023	
The OGs	Udonis Haslem ❧ Mike Miller ❧	December 19, 2023	
The Big Podcast with Shaq	Shaquille O'Neal ❧ Adam Lefkoe ‡	December 21, 2023	
Roommates Show	Jalen Brunson; Josh Hart	February 8, 2024	
The Underground Lounge	Lou Williams ❧ Spank Horton ‡	February 14, 2024	
Mind the Game	LeBron James; JJ Redick ❧ Steve Nash ❧	March 19, 2024	
Hoopin' N Hollerin'	Jason Williams ❧ Adam Ferrone ‡	October 28, 2025	

=== WNBA ===
Podcast	Host(s)	Debut	Ref.
Unapologetically Angel	Angel Reese	September 5, 2024	
Straight to Cam	Cameron Brink; Sydel Curry ‡	January 23, 2025	
Bird's Eye View	Sue Bird ❧	May 16, 2025	
Post Moves	Candace Parker ❧ Aliyah Boston	Jul 23, 2025	
Show Me Something	Sophie Cunningham and West Wilson‡	Jul 28, 2025	
No Hesitation	Sophie Cunningham and Drew Hanlen‡	September 10, 2026	

== Ice hockey players ==
Key
❧	Player was retired when podcast debuted
‡	Non-professional athlete co-host
*	Former co-host

Podcast	Host(s)	Debuted	Ref.
Spittin' Chiclets	Ryan Whitney ❧ Paul Bissonnette; Keith Yandle ❧ Brian "Rear Admiral" McGonagle ‡	August 14, 2016	
Suds with Luds	Craig Ludwig ❧	July 18, 2022	
