= Drei90 =

German podcast

drei90
- Genre: Sports · Comedy
- Language: German

Cast and voices
- Hosted by: Axel Goldmann Bastian Roth; David Frogier de Ponlevoy Enzo Tino

Production
- Length: usually 2 to 4 hours

Publication
- Original release: 27 May 2016
- Updates: weekly

Related
- Website: www.drei90.de

Drei90 (German pronunciation: [dʁaɪ̯ˈnɔɪ̯nt͡sɪç], stylized as drei90) is a German podcast covering topics around association football. It was launched in 2016 by Axel Goldmann, Bastian Roth (alias Basti Red), Vincenzo "Enzo" Tino and David Frogier de Ponlevoy. The episodes, which are considered a mix of both serious and humorous discussions, are published weekly and reach an audience of 20,000 to 25,000 listeners each.

== Content ==
The episodes start with discussions concerning current or recent events in football, with a main focus on their favourite football clubs. These are 1. FC Köln (Goldmann), Eintracht Frankfurt (Roth), SC Freiburg and SV Darmstadt 98 (Frogier de Ponlevoy) as well as VfB Stuttgart (Tino). However, they also talk about topics that are not or only distantly related to football. An example for this is the frequently reoccurring subject of complaining about their experiences in the service sector.

The four podcasters are considered well acclaimed experts of "their" teams, being regularly invited to other podcasts such as the Rasenfunk. Roth is also part of the Fußball 2000 video podcast by the Hessischer Rundfunk, one of Germany's public broadcasting corporations.

In 2019, drei90 won the Podcastpreis, an award given to popular German podcasts, in the Sports category.

Since 2019, drei90 are performing live shows in well-known venues around Germany.
