= Locked On Podcast Network =

Group of American sports podcasts

Company logo of Locked On Sports

The Locked On Podcast Network is a circle of more than 150 commercial sports podcasts produced in the United States providing daily news and commentary at the team and league level about American football, baseball, basketball, and ice hockey. The network also provides coverage of collegiate athletics for approximately 30 American institutions of higher learning.

Initially launched in 2016 by David Locke, radio play-by-play announcer for the Utah Jazz of the National Basketball Association, Locked On Sports was purchased in 2021 by Tegna, an offshoot of the Gannett newspaper group.

== History ==
=== Origins ===
The Locked On Podcast Network — also commonly known as Locked On Sports — was established in June 2016 by David Locke, the radio voice of the Utah Jazz of the National Basketball Association. The network began as a single audio podcast, Locked On Jazz, the name of the show (and eventually the network) being an obvious play on the surname of the founder and host.

In a 2019 interview, Locke observed that after having been named play-by-play announcer of the Utah Jazz, he came to realize that "the job had changed" and that he could no longer simply call 82 games without fan interaction. He indicates that Locked On Jazz emerged as a vehicle to "create a relationship with the fan base, year-round, so that you’re talking to them on game day but also communicating with them on Twitter or Facebook."

The company established headquarters in Park City, Utah.

=== Development ===
Locked On Sports was largely a self-financed enterprise by founder David Locke, with only a single infusion of $750,000 of venture capital announced in 2019. Investors in the fledgling network included Bruce Gordon, formerly the chief financial officer of Disney Interactive Media Group, focused podcast investor Podfund, and Summit Capital, a Utah-based private equity firm.

The Locked On network grew to encompass podcasts targeted to fans of every individual team in the National Football League (NFL), National Basketball Association (NBA), National Hockey League (NHL), and Major League Baseball (MLB) as well as to the sports programs of more than 30 American universities.

=== Sale to Tegna ===
In January 2021 the Locked On Podcast Network was sold to communications giant Tegna, a digital and broadcasting spin-off of the Gannett newspaper group. Terms of the purchase were not disclosed at the time of sale.

Under terms of the sale, Locked On's CEO David Locke, COO Carl Weinstein, and four other full-time staff members were hired by Tegna. Locke remained president of the Locked on Podcast Network as of early 2022.

=== Move to YouTube ===
In May 2021 Locked On Sports expanded from audio to video podcasting when it launched its first YouTube channel. The move spurred growth of the network, with Tegna reporting a 48 percent gain in audience during 2021, for a total of 115 million podcast listens and views. During that year Locked On Sports produced about 700 podcast episodes per week.
