= Podcasts hosted by professional athletes =

Professional athletes have a documented history of going into the sports media industry after they retire from their playing careers. In the mid-to-late 2010s, there were a growing amount of instances of players pursuing media ventures even during their playing careers. Often times, athletes utilize the podcast medium to disseminate their media output, with these podcasts covering the athletes' respective sport.

== History ==
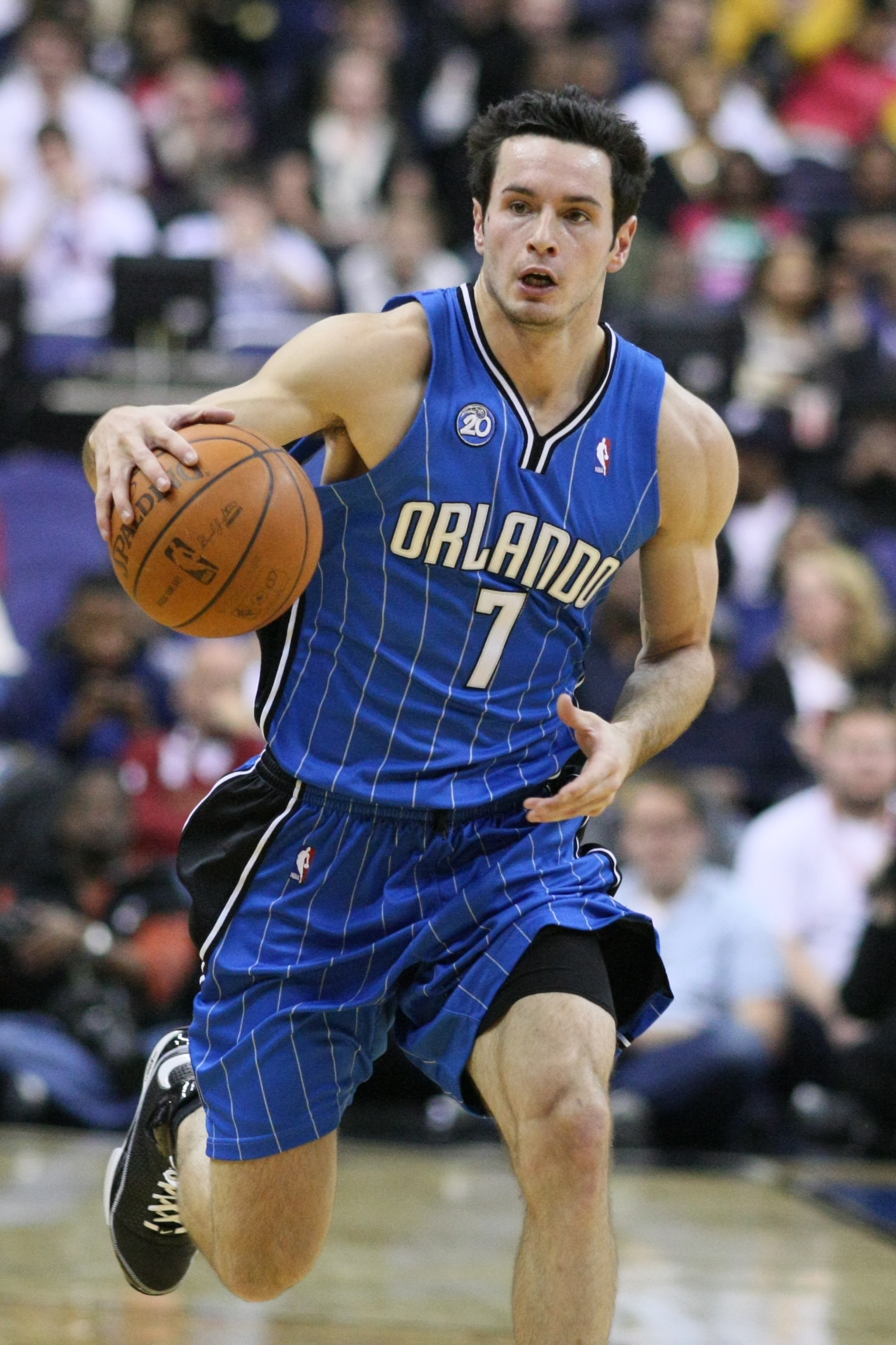
JJ Redick was the first active NBA player to launch a podcast

A. J. Hawk has been cited as the first active professional athlete to begin podcasting, having launched his Hawk Cast in 2014. JJ Redick was the first NBA player to launch a podcast while still an active player, hosting The Vertical on Yahoo! Sports in 2016. After punter Pat McAfee retired from the National Football League (NFL) in 2016, he launched his own eponymous show; it has been credited with "paving the way for fellow athletes to pursue a media career upon retirement".

In the 2020s, the rise in players issuing statements or producing content through their own media ventures was dubbed the "new media" by National Basketball Association (NBA) player Draymond Green. Players have been noted to invite and interview fellow players on their podcasts. Sometimes, these podcasts are co-hosted by friends of the players who did not have professional sport careers.

== Analysis and reception ==
The New York Times writer Jeremy Gordon commented that "the premise of so many athlete-run podcasts" involves how the podcasts "demystify what these people do, allowing talented figures to break down their talent-utilization processes", citing various examples (including Green's podcast, Redick's The Old Man and the Three, Matt Barnes and Stephen Jackson's All the Smoke, and Brandon Marshall and Chad Johnson's I Am Athlete) which all see their respective hosts "trade stories and discuss the modern league". Gordon criticized this concept, writing "the demystification process can, at times, be too thorough", and adding that "it turns out to be deeply enervating to hear these athletes talk about [sports]".

Reception of the podcasts vary from podcast to podcast, though media writers have also written about the broad concept and its increased prominence over the years. Writing about the increase of NBA players launching podcasts and other media pursuits, Alex Siquig of GQ stated "there's a sweetness to this sort of access. It's an unlocked door to brawny, garrulous NBA tenderness. Players talking through COVID with grace and honest introspection has been a boon, even when the topics veer from the sacred to the profane, from brilliance to bullshit."

== See also ==
- List of podcasts hosted by professional athletes
