= Cookie (disambiguation) =

A cookie is a baked or cooked good that is small, flat and sweet (UK English: biscuit).

Cookie, Cookies, or the Cookies may also refer to:

== People ==
- Cookie (nickname)
- Cookie (singer), stage name of British soul singer Janet Ramus
- Cookie, a ring name of Becky Bayless, American professional wrestler
- Cookiee Kawaii, stage name of American singer Vanice Brittany Palmer

== Arts, entertainment, and media ==
=== Fictional characters ===
- Cookie Monster, on the television show Sesame Street
- Cookie (cat), a cat on the television series Blue Peter
- Cookie Falcone, one of the main characters in the Canadian adult animated show Fugget About It
- Cookie Kwan, from The Simpsons
- Cookie Lyon from Empire
- Vernon "Cookie" Locke, from the Australian television serial A Country Practice
- Simon Nelson-Cook or Cookie, in Ned's Declassified School Survival Guide
- Cookie Masterson, one of the hosts of the You Don't Know Jack video games
- Cookie, an ogre from Shrek Forever After

=== Films ===
- Cookie (film), a 1989 American film starring Peter Falk
- Cookies (film), a 1975 French drama film

=== Literature ===
- Cookie (novel), a 2008 novel by Jacqueline Wilson
- Cookies: Bite-Size Life Lessons, a 2006 picture book
- "Cookies", a storyline in the science fiction comedy webtoon series Live with Yourself!

=== Music ===
==== Groups ====
- Cookies (Hong Kong band), a Cantopop music group
- Cookies (American band), an electro-pop group
- Cookie and his Cupcakes, an American swamp pop band
- The Cookies, an American 1950-60s girl music group

==== Albums ====
- Cookie (album), a 1994 album by the English alternative rock band Lush
- Cookies (album), a 2007 album by the band 1990s
- Cookie: The Anthropological Mixtape, a 2002 album by American R&B singer Meshell Ndegeocello
- "Cookie", song by R. Kelly from Black Panties

==== Songs ====
- "Cookie" (song), by NewJeans, 2022

=== Periodicals ===
- Cookie (American magazine), an American magazine, published from 2005 to 2009
- Cookie (Japanese magazine), a Japanese manga magazine published by Shueisha

=== Other arts, entertainment, and media ===
- Cookie (video game), for the ZX Spectrum

== Computing and technology ==
=== Computing ===
- HTTP cookie, a small parcel of information stored on computers by websites
- Magic cookie, a token or short packet of data that is typically not meaningful to the recipient program

=== Other ===
- Cookie (bomb), a type of military blockbuster bomb
- Cookie, a non-directional line marker used in cave diving
- Cuculoris or cookie, a device for casting shadows
- LG Cookie (KP500), a mobile phone by LG Electronics

== Other uses ==
- Cookie (cockatoo) (1933–2016), a Major Mitchell's Cockatoo believed to be the oldest of his species in captivity
- Cookies (cannabis brand), a line of cannabis products and clothing wear created by San Francisco rapper Berner

== See also ==
- Cook (disambiguation)
- Cookie Monster (disambiguation)
