= List of NFL annual rushing yards leaders =

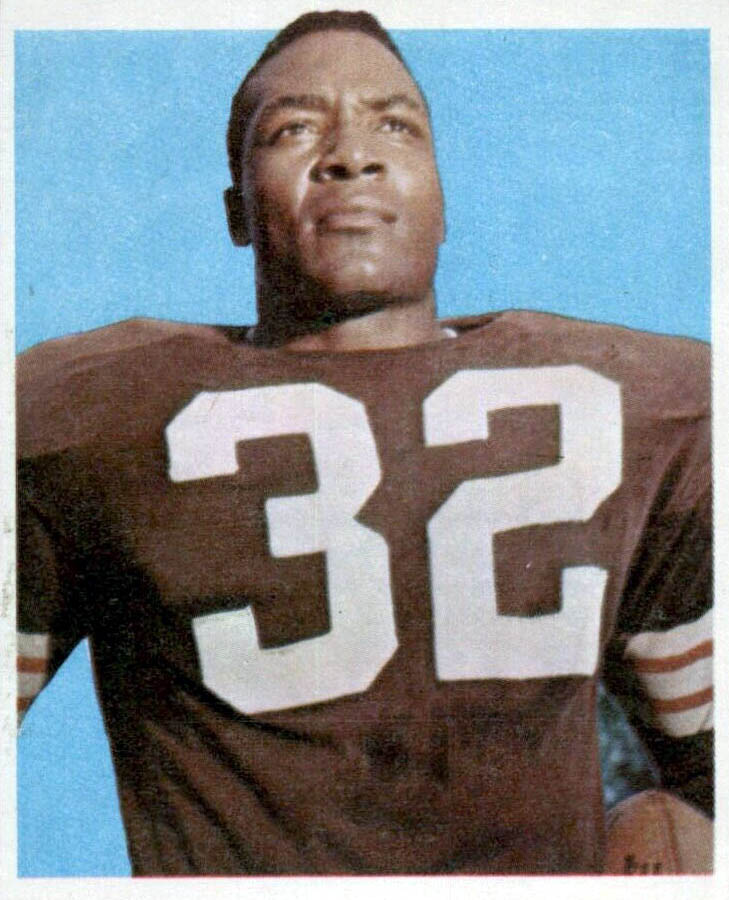
Jim Brown led the league in rushing for eight seasons, including five consecutive seasons from 1957 to 1961 and three consecutive seasons from 1963 to 1965

In American football, rushing and passing are the two main methods of advancing the ball down the field. A rush, also known as a running play, generally occurs when the quarterback hands or tosses the ball backwards to the running back, but other players, such as the quarterback, can run with the ball. In the National Football League (NFL), the player who has recorded the most rushing yards for a season is considered the winner of the rushing title for that season. In addition to the NFL rushing champion, league record books recognize the rushing champions of the American Football League (AFL), which operated from 1960 to 1969 before being absorbed into the National Football League in 1970. The NFL also recognizes the statistics of the All-America Football Conference, which operated from 1946 to 1949 before three of its teams were merged into the NFL, since 2025.

The NFL did not begin keeping official records until the 1932 season. Since the adoption of the 14-game season in 1961, all but one rushing champion have recorded over 1,000 yards rushing. Nine rushing champions have recorded over 2,000 rushing yards, a feat first accomplished by O. J. Simpson in 1973 and most recently achieved by Saquon Barkley in the 2024 season.

The player with the most rushing titles is Jim Brown, who was the rushing champion eight times over his career. Eric Dickerson, Emmitt Smith, O. J. Simpson, Steve Van Buren, and Barry Sanders are tied for the second-most rushing titles, each having won four times. Jim Brown also holds the record for the most consecutive rushing titles with five, having led the league in rushing each year from 1957 to 1961. Steve Van Buren, Emmitt Smith, and Earl Campbell each recorded three consecutive rushing titles. The Cleveland Browns have recorded the most rushing titles with eleven; the Dallas Cowboys rank second, with seven rushing titles. The most recent rushing champion is James Cook of the Buffalo Bills, who led the league with 1,621 rushing yards during the 2025 season. Derrick Henry is the most recent player to win back-to-back titles.

In 2022, the NFL announced, "To permanently honor the impact of Jim Brown in the NFL, the player with the most rushing yards each season will be presented with the "Jim Brown Award". Josh Jacobs was the inaugural recipient.

== List of NFL rushing title winners ==
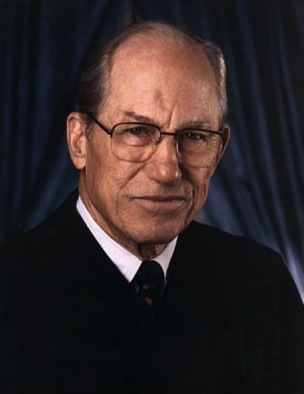
Byron "Whizzer" White, a future associate justice of the US Supreme Court, won the league rushing title in 1938 and 1940

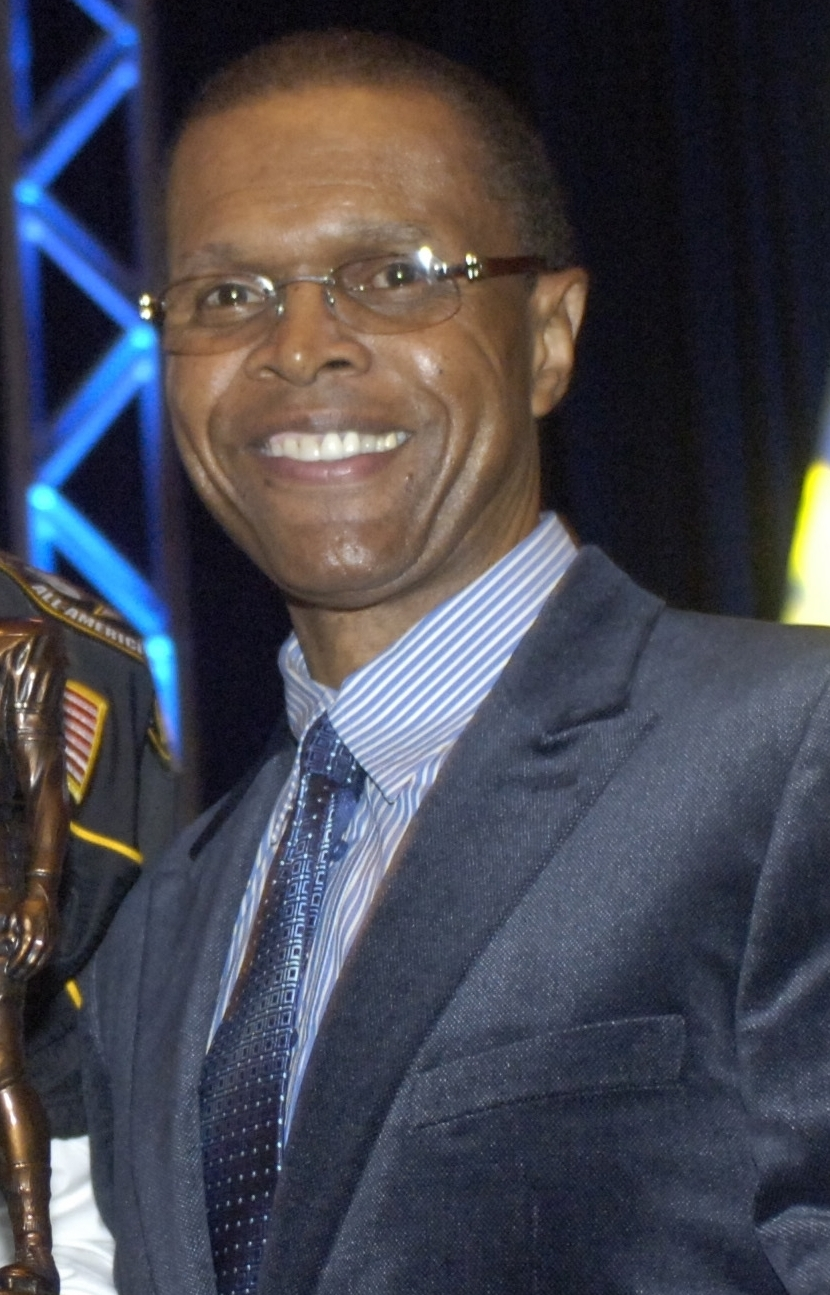
Gale Sayers led the NFL in rushing in 1966 and 1969

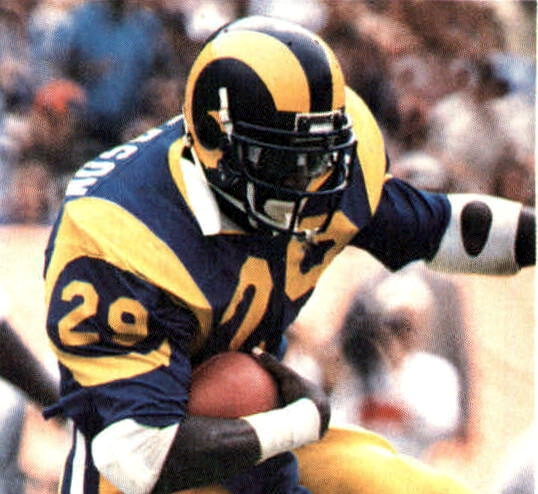
Eric Dickerson led the league in rushing in 1983 and 1984, his first two seasons in the league, and won two more titles in 1986 and 1988

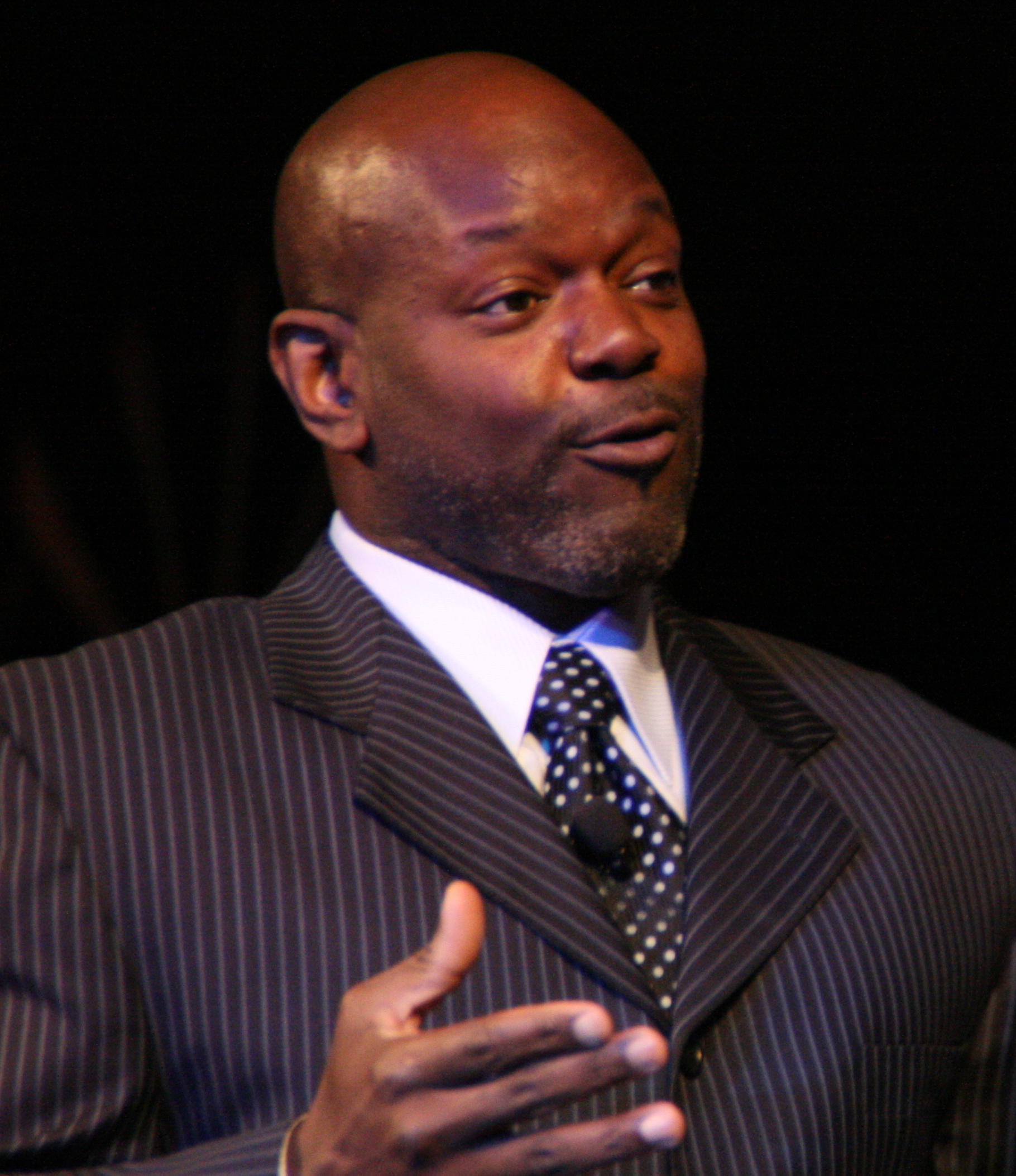
Emmitt Smith was the league's rushing champion four times, including three consecutive years from 1991 to 1993

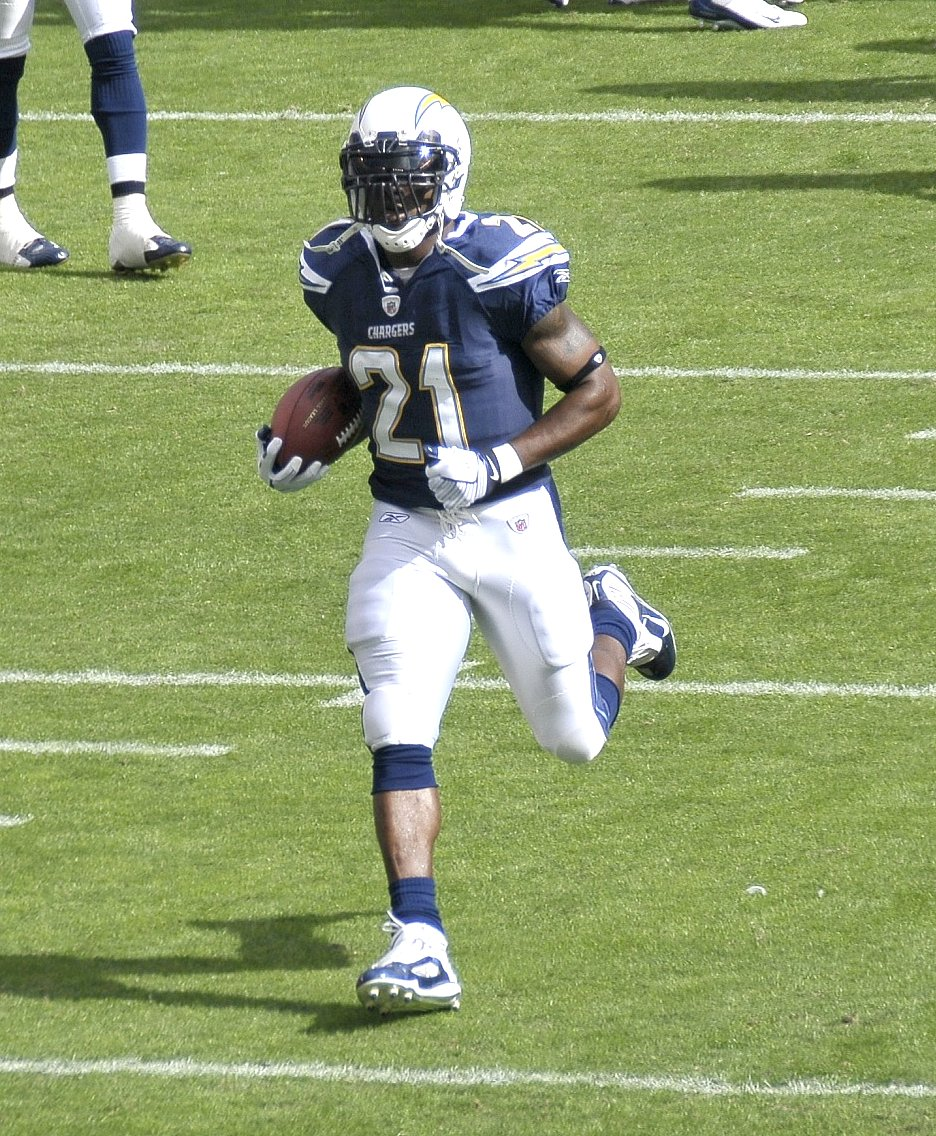
LaDainian Tomlinson won back-to-back rushing titles in 2006 and 2007

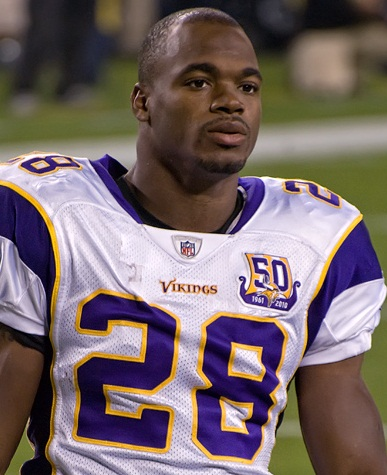
Adrian Peterson led the league in rushing three times in the 2008, 2012, and 2015 seasons

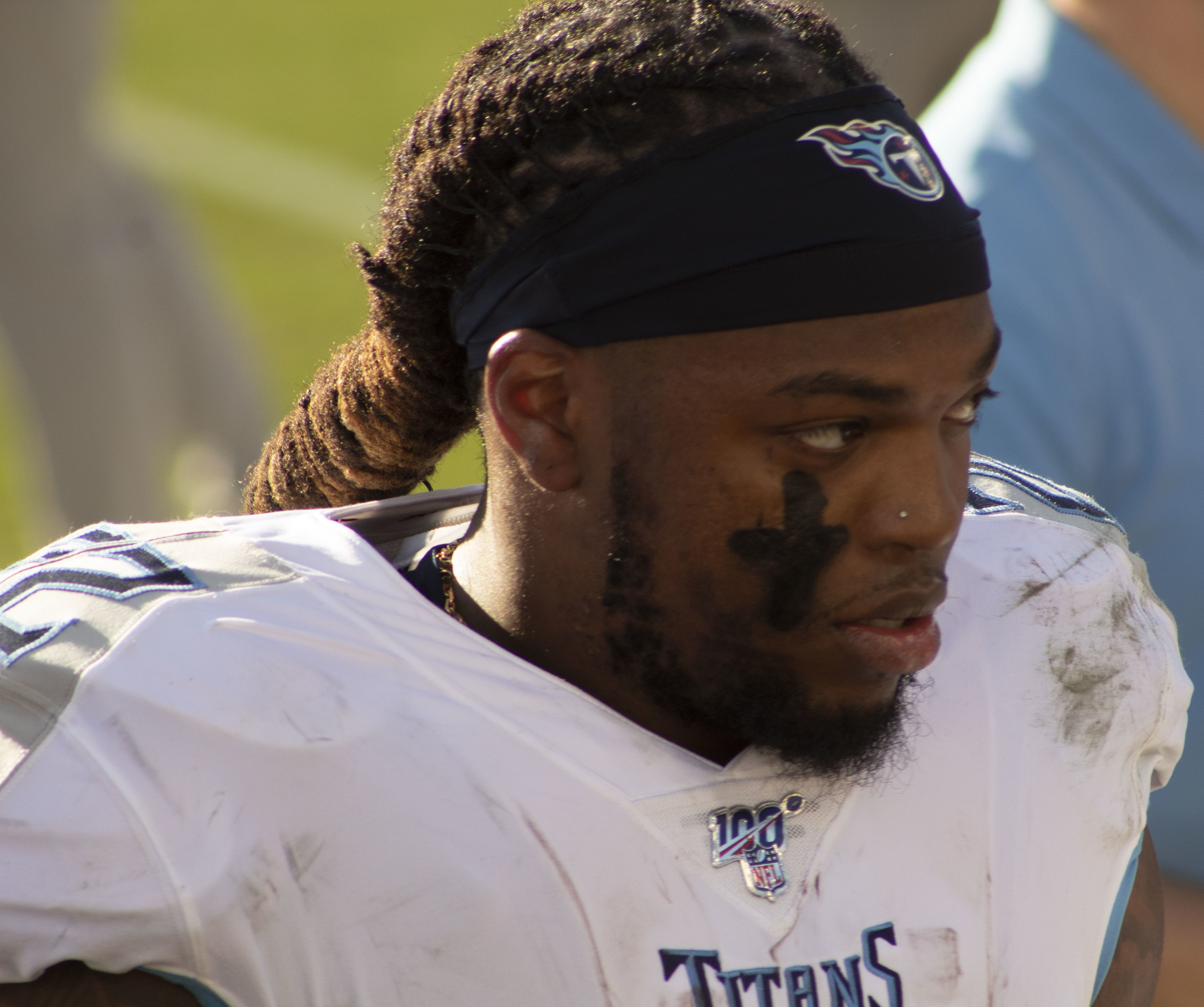
Derrick Henry won back-to-back rushing titles in 2019 and 2020.

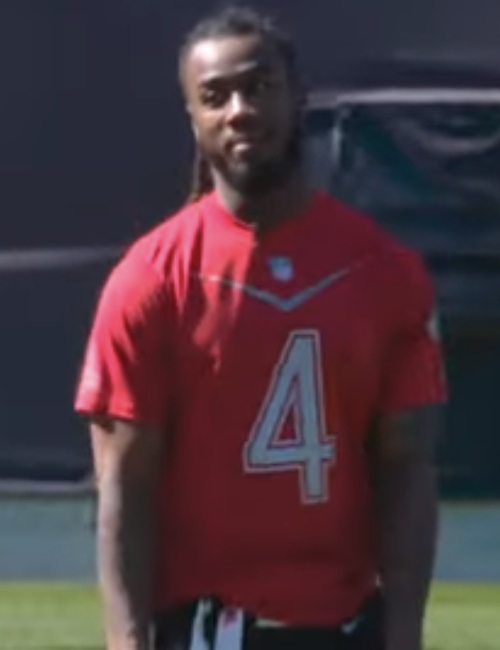
James Cook is the most recent player to lead the league in rushing yards.

Key
^	Pro Football Hall of Fame member
*	Player is active
†	Player won the AP Most Valuable Player award in the same year
‡	Player won the AP Offensive Player of the Year award in the same year

National Football League (NFL) rushing title winners by season
Season	Winner	Team	Yards	Games (Note: The NFL did not have a set number of games for teams to play until the 1935 season, instead setting a minimum.)
1932	Cliff Battles^{^}	Boston Braves	576	10 (Note: The Boston Braves played 10 games in a non-standardized season.)
1933	Jim Musick	Boston Redskins	809	12 (Note: The Boston Redskins played 12 games in a non-standardized season.)
1934	Beattie Feathers	Chicago Bears	1,004	13 (Note: The Chicago Bears played 13 games in a non-standardized season.)
1935	Doug Russell	Chicago Cardinals	499	12
1936	Tuffy Leemans	New York Giants	830	12
1937	Cliff Battles^{^} (2)	Washington Redskins	874	11
1938	Byron White	Pittsburgh Pirates	567	11
1939	Bill Osmanski	Chicago Bears	699	11
1940	Byron White (2)	Detroit Lions	514	11
1941	Pug Manders	Brooklyn Dodgers	486	11
1942	Bill Dudley^{^}	Pittsburgh Steelers	696	11
1943	Bill Paschal	New York Giants	572	10
1944	Bill Paschal (2)	New York Giants	737	10
1945	Steve Van Buren^{^}	Philadelphia Eagles	832	10
1946	Bill Dudley^{^} (2)	Pittsburgh Steelers	604	11
1947	Steve Van Buren^{^} (2)	Philadelphia Eagles	1,008	12
1948	Steve Van Buren^{^} (3)	Philadelphia Eagles	945	12
1949	Steve Van Buren^{^} (4)	Philadelphia Eagles	1,146	12
1950	Marion Motley^{^}	Cleveland Browns	810	12
1951	Eddie Price	New York Giants	971	12
1952	Dan Towler	Los Angeles Rams	894	12
1953	Joe Perry^{^}	San Francisco 49ers	1,018	12
1954	Joe Perry^{^} (2)	San Francisco 49ers	1,049	12
1955	Alan Ameche	Baltimore Colts	961	12
1956	Rick Casares	Chicago Bears	1,126	12
1957	Jim Brown^{^ †}	Cleveland Browns	942	12
1958	Jim Brown^{^ †} (2)	Cleveland Browns	1,527	12
1959	Jim Brown^{^} (3)	Cleveland Browns	1,329	12
1960	Jim Brown^{^} (4)	Cleveland Browns	1,257	12
1961	Jim Brown^{^} (5)	Cleveland Browns	1,408	14
1962	Jim Taylor^{^}	Green Bay Packers	1,474	14
1963	Jim Brown^{^} (6)	Cleveland Browns	1,863	14
1964	Jim Brown^{^} (7)	Cleveland Browns	1,446	14
1965	Jim Brown^{^ †}(8)	Cleveland Browns	1,544	14
1966	Gale Sayers^{^}	Chicago Bears	1,231	14
1967	Leroy Kelly^{^}	Cleveland Browns	1,205	14
1968	Leroy Kelly^{^} (2)	Cleveland Browns	1,239	14
1969	Gale Sayers^{^} (2)	Chicago Bears	1,032	14
1970	Larry Brown	Washington Redskins	1,125	14
1971	Floyd Little^{^}	Denver Broncos	1,133	14
1972	O. J. Simpson^{^}	Buffalo Bills	1,251	14
1973	O. J. Simpson^{^ † ‡} (2)	Buffalo Bills	2,003	14
1974	Otis Armstrong	Denver Broncos	1,407	14
1975	O. J. Simpson^{^} (3)	Buffalo Bills	1,817	14
1976	O. J. Simpson^{^} (4)	Buffalo Bills	1,503	14
1977	Walter Payton^{^ † ‡}	Chicago Bears	1,852	14
1978	Earl Campbell^{^ ‡}	Houston Oilers	1,450	15
1979	Earl Campbell^{^ † ‡} (2)	Houston Oilers	1,697	16
1980	Earl Campbell^{^ ‡} (3)	Houston Oilers	1,934	15
1981	George Rogers	New Orleans Saints	1,674	16
1982	Freeman McNeil	New York Jets	786	9 (Note: The 1982 season was reduced from 16 to 9 games due to a 57-day players' strike.)
1983	Eric Dickerson^{^}	Los Angeles Rams	1,808	16
1984	Eric Dickerson^{^} (2)	Los Angeles Rams	2,105	16
1985	Marcus Allen^{^ † ‡}	Los Angeles Raiders	1,759	16
1986	Eric Dickerson^{^} (3)	Los Angeles Rams	1,821	16
1987	Charles White	Los Angeles Rams	1,374	15 (Note: The 1987 season was reduced from 16 to 15 games due to a 24-day players' strike.)
1988	Eric Dickerson^{^} (4)	Indianapolis Colts	1,659	16
1989	Christian Okoye	Kansas City Chiefs	1,480	16
1990	Barry Sanders^{^}	Detroit Lions	1,304	16
1991	Emmitt Smith^{^}	Dallas Cowboys	1,563	16
1992	Emmitt Smith^{^} (2)	Dallas Cowboys	1,713	16
1993	Emmitt Smith^{^ †} (3)	Dallas Cowboys	1,486	14
1994	Barry Sanders^{^ ‡} (2)	Detroit Lions	1,883	16
1995	Emmitt Smith^{^} (4)	Dallas Cowboys	1,773	16
1996	Barry Sanders^{^} (3)	Detroit Lions	1,553	16
1997	Barry Sanders^{^ † ‡} (4)	Detroit Lions	2,053	16
1998	Terrell Davis^{^ † ‡}	Denver Broncos	2,008	16
1999	Edgerrin James^{^}	Indianapolis Colts	1,553	16
2000	Edgerrin James^{^} (2)	Indianapolis Colts	1,709	16
2001	Priest Holmes	Kansas City Chiefs	1,555	16
2002	Ricky Williams	Miami Dolphins	1,853	16
2003	Jamal Lewis^{‡}	Baltimore Ravens	2,066	16
2004	Curtis Martin^{^}	New York Jets	1,697	16
2005	Shaun Alexander^{† ‡}	Seattle Seahawks	1,880	16
2006	LaDainian Tomlinson^{^ † ‡}	San Diego Chargers	1,815	16
2007	LaDainian Tomlinson^{^} (2)	San Diego Chargers	1,474	16
2008	Adrian Peterson	Minnesota Vikings	1,760	16
2009	Chris Johnson^{‡}	Tennessee Titans	2,006	16
2010	Arian Foster	Houston Texans	1,616	16
2011	Maurice Jones-Drew	Jacksonville Jaguars	1,606	16
2012	Adrian Peterson^{† ‡} (2)	Minnesota Vikings	2,097	16
2013	LeSean McCoy	Philadelphia Eagles	1,607	16
2014	DeMarco Murray^{‡}	Dallas Cowboys	1,845	16
2015	Adrian Peterson (3)	Minnesota Vikings	1,485	16
2016	Ezekiel Elliott	Dallas Cowboys	1,631	15
2017	Kareem Hunt	Kansas City Chiefs	1,327	16
2018	Ezekiel Elliott (2)	Dallas Cowboys	1,434	15
2019	Derrick Henry^{*}	Tennessee Titans	1,540	15
2020	Derrick Henry^{*} ^{‡} (2)	Tennessee Titans	2,027	16
2021	Jonathan Taylor^{*}	Indianapolis Colts	1,811	17
2022	Josh Jacobs^{*}	Las Vegas Raiders	1,653	17
2023	Christian McCaffrey^{*} ^{‡}	San Francisco 49ers	1,459	16
2024	Saquon Barkley^{*} ^{‡}	Philadelphia Eagles	2,005	16
2025	James Cook^{*}	Buffalo Bills	1,621	17

== List of AAFC rushing title winners ==
Key
Symbol	Meaning
Player	The player who recorded the most rushing yards in the AAFC
Yds	The total number of rushing yards the player had
GP	The number of games played by the player during the season
*	Player set the single-season rushing yards record
†	Pro Football Hall of Fame member
(#)	Denotes the number of times a player appears in this list

AAFC annual rushing yards leaders by season
Season	Player	Yds	GP	Team	Ref.
1946	Spec Sanders	709*	13	New York Yankees	
1947	Spec Sanders (2)	1,432*	14	New York Yankees	
1948	Marion Motley	964	14	Cleveland Browns	
1949	Joe Perry	783	11	San Francisco 49ers	

== List of AFL rushing title winners ==
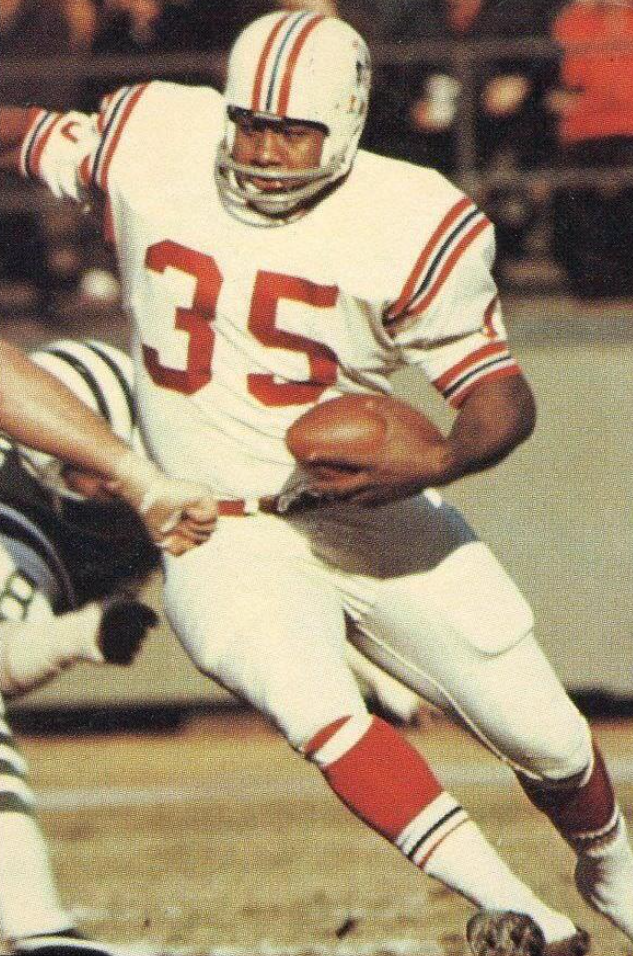
Jim Nance ran for 1,458 yards in 1966 on his way to the AFL MVP.

Key
Symbol	Meaning
Player	The player who recorded the most rushing yards in the AFL
Yds	The total number of rushing yards the player had
GP	The number of games played by the player during the season
*	Player set the single-season rushing yards record
†	Pro Football Hall of Fame member
(#)	Denotes the number of times a player appears in this list

American Football League (AFL) rushing title winners by season
Season	Winner	Team	Yards	Games
1960	Abner Haynes	Dallas Texans	875	14
1961	Billy Cannon	Houston Oilers	948	14
1962	Cookie Gilchrist	Buffalo Bills	1,096	14
1963	Clem Daniels	Oakland Raiders	1,099	14
1964	Cookie Gilchrist (2)	Buffalo Bills	981	14
1965	Paul Lowe	San Diego Chargers	1,121	14
1966	Jim Nance	Boston Patriots	1,458	14
1967	Jim Nance (2)	Boston Patriots	1,216	14
1968	Paul Robinson	Cincinnati Bengals	1,023	14
1969	Dickie Post	San Diego Chargers	873	14

== Most rushing titles ==
Count	Player	Seasons	Team(s)
8	Jim Brown	1957–1961, 1963–1965	Cleveland Browns
4	Eric Dickerson	1983, 1984, 1986, 1988	Los Angeles Rams / Indianapolis Colts
4	Barry Sanders	1990, 1994, 1996, 1997	Detroit Lions
4	O. J. Simpson	1972, 1973, 1975, 1976	Buffalo Bills
4	Emmitt Smith	1991–1993, 1995	Dallas Cowboys
4	Steve Van Buren	1945, 1947–1949	Philadelphia Eagles
3	Earl Campbell	1978–1980	Houston Oilers
3	Joe Perry	1949, 1953, 1954	San Francisco 49ers
3	Adrian Peterson	2008, 2012, 2015	Minnesota Vikings
2	Cliff Battles	1932, 1937	Boston Braves / Washington Redskins
2	Bill Dudley	1942, 1946	Pittsburgh Steelers
2	Ezekiel Elliott	2016, 2018	Dallas Cowboys
2	Cookie Gilchrist	1962, 1964	Buffalo Bills
2	Derrick Henry	2019, 2020	Tennessee Titans
2	Edgerrin James	1999, 2000	Indianapolis Colts
2	Leroy Kelly	1967, 1968	Cleveland Browns
2	Marion Motley	1948, 1950	Cleveland Browns
2	Jim Nance	1966, 1967	Boston Patriots
2	Bill Paschal	1943, 1944	New York Giants
2	Spec Sanders	1946, 1947	New York Yankees
2	Gale Sayers	1966, 1969	Chicago Bears
2	LaDainian Tomlinson	2006, 2007	San Diego Chargers
2	Byron White	1938, 1940	Pittsburgh Pirates, Detroit Lions

== See also ==
- List of National Football League career rushing yards leaders
- List of National Football League annual rushing touchdowns leaders
- List of NCAA major college football yearly rushing leaders
