= 1943 New York Giants season =

NFL team season

- Owner: John V. Mara
- General manager: Wellington Mara (Vice President)
- Head coach: Steve Owen
- Home stadium: Polo Grounds

Results
- Record: 6–3–1
- Division place: T-2nd NFL Eastern
- Playoffs: Lost Eastern Divisional Playoff (vs. Redskins) 0–28

The 1943 New York Giants season marked the franchise's 19th year in the National Football League (NFL). The team finished tied with the Washington Redskins. In the Eastern Division playoff, the team was shutout 28–0.

== Schedule ==
Game	Date	Opponent	Result	Record	Venue	Attendance	Recap	Sources
1	October 9	at **Steagles**	**L** 14–28	0–1	Shibe Park	15,340	Recap	
2	October 17	at **Brooklyn Dodgers**	**W** 20–0	1–1	Ebbets Field	18,361	Recap	
3	October 24	**Steagles**	**W** 42–14	2–1	Polo Grounds	42,681	Recap	
4	October 31	Green Bay Packers	**L** 21–35	2–2	Polo Grounds	46,208	Recap	
5	November 7	at Detroit Lions	**T** 0–0	2–2–1	Briggs Stadium	16,992	Recap	
6	November 14	Chicago Bears	**L** 7–56	2–3–1	Polo Grounds	56,681	Recap	
7	November 21	Chicago Cardinals	**W** 24–13	3–3–1	Polo Grounds	19,804	Recap	
8	November 28	**Brooklyn Dodgers**	**W** 24–7	4–3–1	Polo Grounds	28,706	Recap	
9	December 5	**Washington Redskins**	**W** 14–10	5–3–1	Polo Grounds	51,308	Recap	
10	December 12	at **Washington Redskins**	**W** 31–7	6–3–1	Griffith Stadium	35,540	Recap	
Note: Intra-division opponents are in **bold** text.

== Game summaries ==
=== Game 1: at Phil-Pitt "Steagles" ===
Week Four: New York Giants at Philadelphia-Pittsburgh "Steagles"

Quarter	1	2	3	4	Total
Giants	14	0	0	0	14
Steagles	0	7	0	21	28

at Shibe Park, Philadelphia, Pennsylvania

- Date: October 9
- Game attendance: 15,340

Game information

First quarter

- NYG Len Younce 30-yard interception return (Ward Cuff kick)
- NYG Bill Paschal 1-yard run (Cuff kick)

Second quarter

- PPT Ernie Steele 4-yard rush (Roy Zimmerman kick)

Fourth quarter

- PPT Bob Thurbon 11-yard pass from Zimmerman (Zimmerman kick)
- PPT Tom Miller 31-yard pass from Zimmerman (Zimmerman kick)
- PPT Allie Sherman 4-yard run (Gordon Paschka kick)

=== Game 2: at Brooklyn Dodgers ===
Week Five: New York Giants at Brooklyn Dodgers

Quarter	1	2	3	4	Total
Giants	13	0	0	7	20
Dodgers	0	0	0	0	0

at Ebbets Field, Brooklyn, New York

- Date: October 17
- Game attendance: 18,361

Game information

First quarter

- NYG Chuck Avedisian recovered blocked punt in end zone
- NYG Paschal run (Cuff kick)

Fourth quarter

- NYG Paschal 3-yard run (Cuff kick)

=== Game 3: vs. Phil-Pitt "Steagles" ===
Week Six: Philadelphia-Pittsburgh "Steagles" at New York Giants

Quarter	1	2	3	4	Total
Steagles	0	0	0	14	14
Giants	14	14	14	0	42

at Polo Grounds, New York, New York

- Date: October 24
- Game attendance: 42,681

Game information

First quarter

- NYG Neal Adams 34-yard blocked punt return (Cuff kick)
- NYG Will Walls 31-yard pass from Emery Nix (Cuff kick)

Second quarter

- NYG Paschal 4-yard run (Cuff kick)
- NYG Frank Liebel 6-yard pass from Tuffy Leemans (Cuff kick)

Third quarter

- NYG Al Blozis 35-yard blocked punt return (Cuff kick)
- NYG Paschal 1-yard run (Cuff kick)

Fourth quarter

- PPT Ben Kish 4-yard pass from Allie Sherman (Ted Laux kick)
- PPT Al Wukits 2-yard fumble return (Laux kick)

=== Game 4: vs. Green Bay Packers ===
Week Seven: Green Bay Packers at New York Giants

Quarter	1	2	3	4	Total
Packers	7	14	0	14	35
Giants	7	0	7	7	21

at Polo Grounds, New York, New York

- Date: October 31
- Game attendance: 46,208

Game information

First quarter

- GB Harry Jacunski 38-yard pass from Don Hutson (Hutson kick)
- NYG Paschal 16-yard pass from Leemans (Cuff kick)

Second quarter

- GB Tony Canadeo 12-yard pass from Andy Uram (Hutson kick)
- GB Hutson 17-yard pass from Canadeo (Hutson kick)

Third quarter

- NYG Paschal 4-yard run (Cuff kick)

Fourth quarter

- NYG Paschal 1-yard run (Cuff kick)
- GB Hutson 12-yard pass from Canadeo (Hutson kick)
- GB Canadeo 35-yard run (Hutson kick)

=== Game 5: at Detroit Lions ===
Week Eight: New York Giants at Detroit Lions

Quarter	1	2	3	4	Total
Giants	0	0	0	0	0
Lions	0	0	0	0	0

at Briggs Stadium, Detroit, Michigan

- Date: November 7
- Game attendance: 16,992

As of the end of the 2024 NFL season, the game is the most recent 0–0 tie in NFL history.

=== Game 6: vs. Chicago Bears ===
Week Nine: Chicago Bears at New York Giants

Quarter	1	2	3	4	Total
Bears	14	14	14	14	56
Giants	0	7	0	0	7

at Polo Grounds, New York, New York

- Date: November 14
- Game attendance: 56,591

Game information

First quarter

- CHB Jim Benton 4-yard pass from Sid Luckman (Bob Snyder kick)
- CHB Connie Mack Berry 31-yard pass from Luckman (Snyder kick)

Second quarter

- NYG Carl Kinscherf 1-yard run (Cuff kick)
- CHB Hamp Pool 27-yard pass from Luckman (Snyder kick)
- CHB Harry Clarke 4-yard run (Snyder kick)

Third quarter

- CHB Clarke 62-yard pass from Luckman (Snyder kick)
- CHB Benton 15-yard pass from Luckman (Snyder kick)

Fourth quarter

- CHB George Wilson 3-yard pass from Luckman (Snyder kick)
- CHB Pool 40-yard pass from Luckman (Snyder kick)

=== Game 7: vs. Chicago Cardinals ===
Week Ten: Chicago Cardinals at New York Giants

Quarter	1	2	3	4	Total
Cardinals	0	0	0	13	13
Giants	7	3	14	0	24

at Polo Grounds, New York, New York

- Date: November 21
- Game attendance: 19,804

Game information

First quarter

- NYG Cuff 6-yard run (Cuff kick)

Second quarter

- NYG Cuff 45-yard FG

Third quarter

- NYG Adams 17-yard pass from Leemans (Cuff kick)
- NYG Liebel 23-yard pass from Leemans (Cuff kick)

Fourth quarter

- CHC John Grigas 2-yard run (Conway Baker kick)
- CHC Baker 2-yard fumble return

=== Game 8: vs. Brooklyn Dodgers ===
Week Eleven: Brooklyn Dodgers at New York Giants

Quarter	1	2	3	4	Total
Dodgers	0	0	7	0	7
Giants	7	10	7	0	24

at Polo Grounds, New York, New York

- Date: November 28
- Game attendance: 28,706

Game information

First quarter

- NYG Cuff 14-yard run (Cuff kick)

Second quarter

- NYG Paschal 8-yard run (Cuff kick)
- NYG Cuff 37-yard FG

Third quarter

- BRK Bruiser Kinard 4-yard pass from Pug Manders (Kinard kick)
- NYG Paschal 25-yard pass from Leemans (Cuff kick)

=== Game 9: vs. Washington Redskins ===
Week Twelve:Washington Redskins at New York Giants

Quarter	1	2	3	4	Total
Redskins	3	0	7	0	10
Giants	0	0	7	7	14

at Polo Grounds, New York, New York

- Date: December 5
- Game attendance: 51,308

Game information

First quarter

- WAS Bob Masterson 26-yard FG

Third quarter

- WAS Andy Farkas 1-yard run (Masterson kick)
- NYG Paschal 1-yard run (Cuff kick)

Fourth quarter

- NYG Paschal 53-yard run (Cuff kick)

=== Game 10: at Washington Redskins ===
Week Thirteen: New York Giants at Washington Redskins

Quarter	1	2	3	4	Total
Giants	0	14	10	7	31
Redskins	0	7	0	0	7

at Griffith Stadium, Washington, D.C.

- Date: December 12
- Game attendance: 35,540

Game information

Second quarter

- WAS Joe Aguirre 27-yard pass from Sammy Baugh (Masterson kick)
- NYG Steve Pritko blocked punt recovery in end zone (Cuff kick)
- NYG Liebel 56-yard pass from Nix (Cuff kick)

Third quarter

- NYG Cuff 20-yard run (Cuff kick)
- NYG Cuff 18-yard FG

Fourth quarter

- NYG Walls 33-yard pass from Nix (Cuff kick)

== Playoffs ==
Round	Date	Opponent	Result	Venue	Attendance	Recap	Sources
Division	December 19	Washington Redskins	L 0–28	Polo Grounds	42,800	Recap	

== Roster ==
1943 New York Giants final roster
Backs: 42 Hub Barker RB/S; 5 Dave Brown FB/LB; 14 Ward Cuff RB/CB/K; 50 Bull Karcis FB/LB; 25 Carl Kinscherf FB/LB/P; 4 Tuffy Leemans FB/LB; 44 Emery Nix RB/CB; 8 Bill Paschal FB/LB/P; 20 Leland Shaffer RB/S; 15 Hank Soar RB/CB; 37 Joe Sulaitis RB/S	Linemen/Linebackers: 55 Chuck Avedisian G/DG; 32 Al Blozis T/DT; 26 Vic Carroll T/DT; 36 Frank Cope T/DT; 12 Walt Dubzinski C/LB; 7 Mel Hein C/LB; 34 Sal Marone G/DG; 29 Bill Piccolo C/LB; 39 Tom Roberts G/DG/T/DT; 69 Frank Umont T/DT; 31 Larry Visnic G/DG; 60 Len Younce G/DG	Ends/Receivers: 30 O'Neal Adams; 28 Verlin Adams; 11 Steve Pritko; 22 Frank Liebel; 24 Will Walls; Reserve: -- Win Pedersen T/DT (Military); rookies in italics

== Standings ==
NFL Eastern Division
	W	L	T	PCT	DIV	PF	PA	STK
Washington Redskins	6	3	1	.667	2–3–1	229	137	L3
New York Giants	6	3	1	.667	5–1	197	170	W4
Phil-Pitt	5	4	1	.556	3–2–1	225	230	L1
Brooklyn Dodgers	2	8	0	.200	1–5	65	234	L2

Note: Tie games were not officially counted in the standings until 1972.

=== 1943 Eastern Division Playoff: vs. Washington Redskins ===
1943 Eastern Division Playoff: vs. Washington Redskins

Quarter	1	2	3	4	Total
Redskins	0	14	0	14	28
Giants	0	0	0	0	0

at Polo Grounds, New York, New York

- Date: December 19
- Game attendance: 42,800

Game information

Second quarter

- WAS Farkas 2-yard run (Masterson kick)
- WAS Farkas 2-yard run (Masterson kick)

Fourth quarter

- WAS Farkas 1-yard run (Masterson kick)
- WAS Ted Lapka 11-yard pass from Baugh (Masterson kick)

== See also ==
- List of New York Giants seasons
