= List of NFL annual rushing touchdowns leaders =

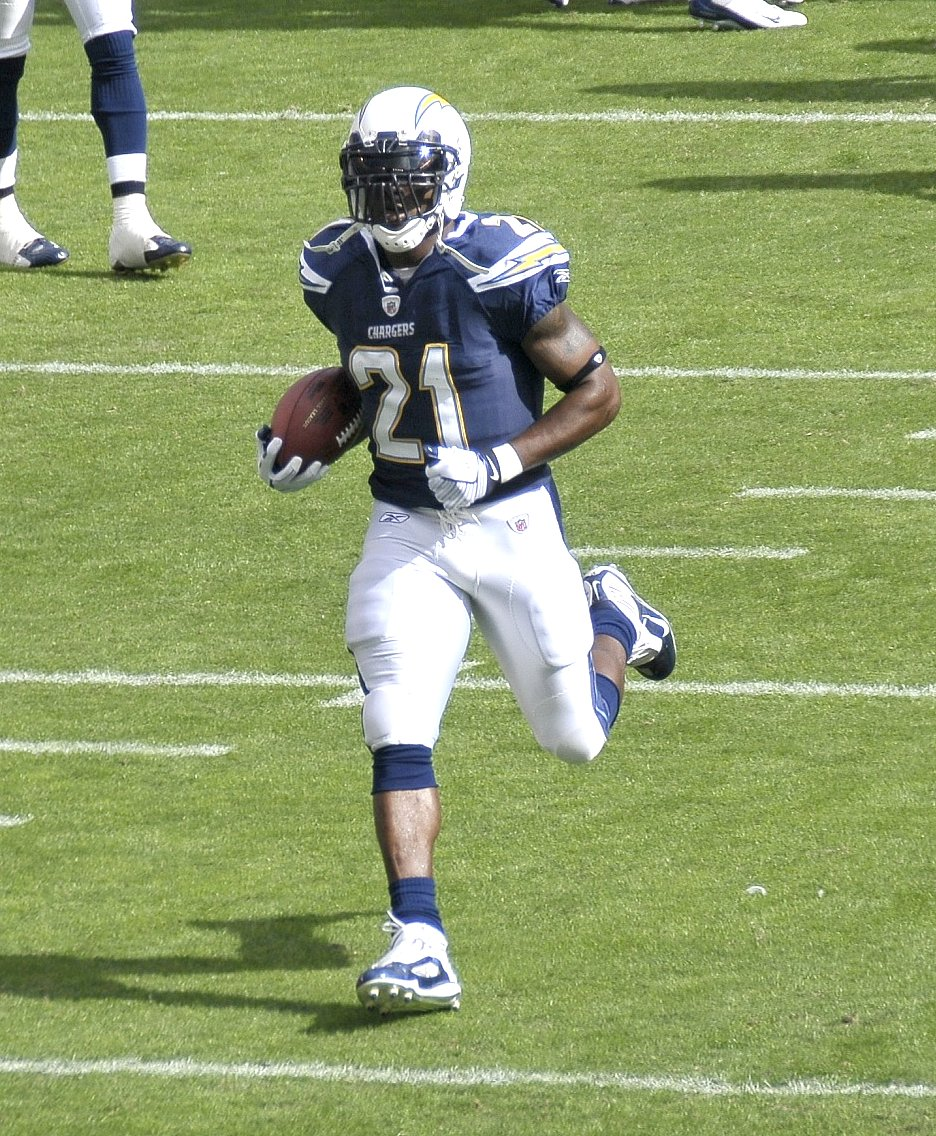
LaDainian Tomlinson holds the single-season rushing touchdowns record, running for 28 touchdowns in 2006.

In American football, rushing and passing are the two main methods of advancing the ball down the field. A rush, also known as a running play, generally occurs when the quarterback hands or tosses the ball backwards to the running back, but other players, such as the quarterback, can run with the ball. A rushing touchdown is a play where the runner carries the ball into the end zone without a forward pass being involved.

The National Football League (NFL) did not begin keeping official records until the 1932 season. In addition to the NFL rushing touchdowns leaders, league record books recognize the rushing touchdowns leaders of the American Football League (AFL), which operated from 1960 to 1969 before being absorbed into the NFL in 1970. The NFL also recognizes the statistics of the All-America Football Conference, which operated from 1946 to 1949 before three of its teams were merged into the NFL, since 2025.

The record for rushing touchdowns in a season is held by LaDainian Tomlinson of the San Diego Chargers who rushed for 28 touchdowns in 2006. Prior to Tomlinson's 2006 season, the record was jointly held by Priest Holmes and Shaun Alexander, each rushing for 27 touchdowns in 2003 and 2005, respectively. There have been eleven instances where a player has rushed for 20 or more touchdowns in a season and only two players, Emmitt Smith and Priest Holmes, have done so twice. Jim Brown led the league in rushing touchdowns five times, the most of any player in league history.

== NFL annual rushing touchdowns leaders ==
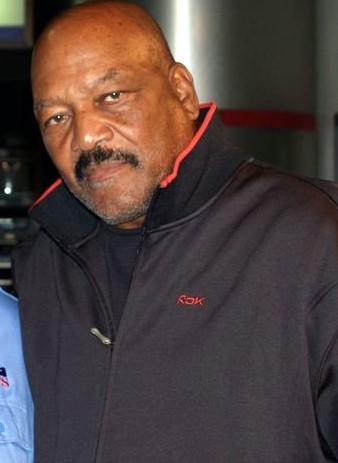
In 1965, Jim Brown led the league in rushing touchdowns for a fifth time, an NFL record.

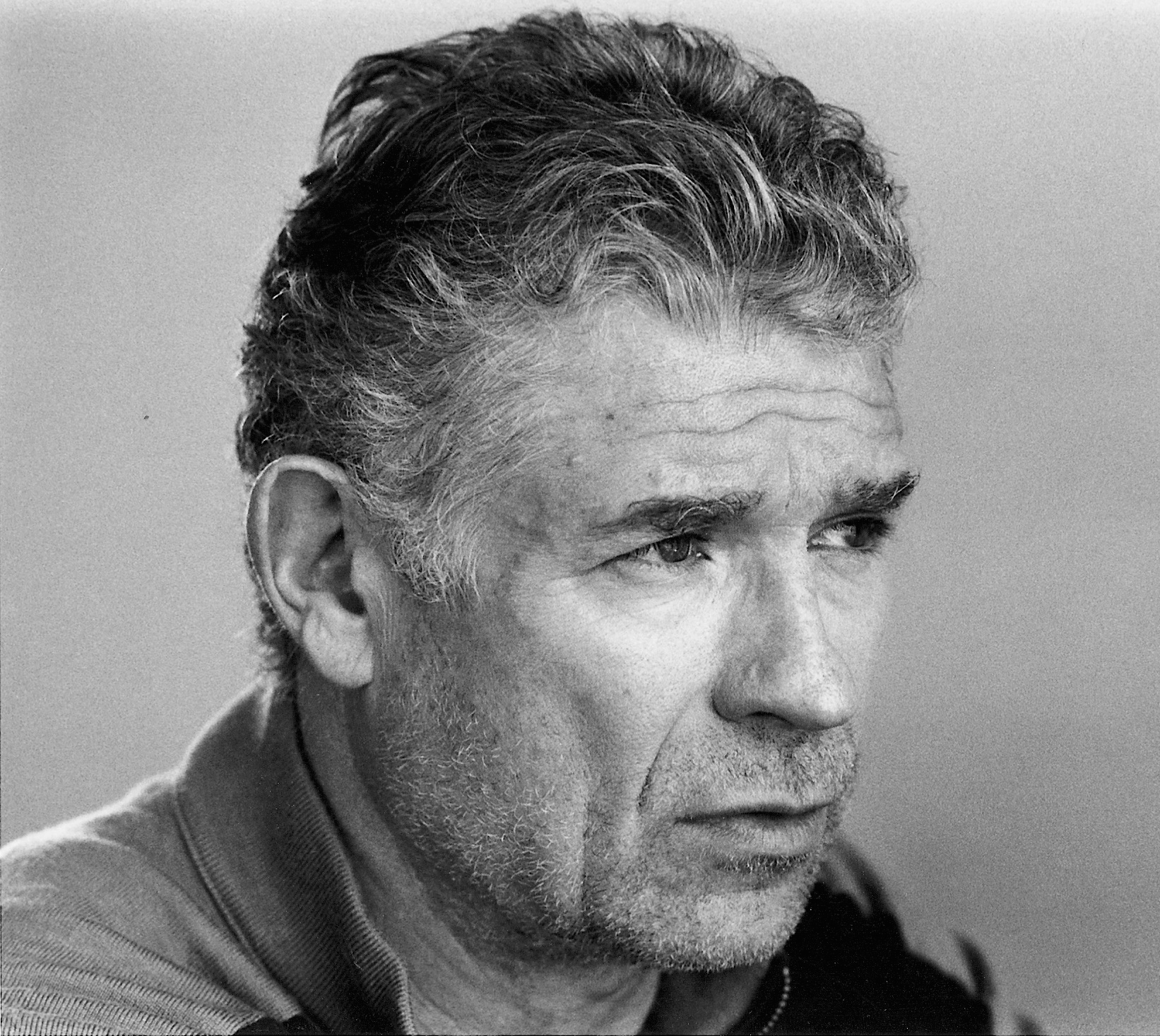
John Riggins led the league in 1983 with the first 20+ rushing touchdown season.

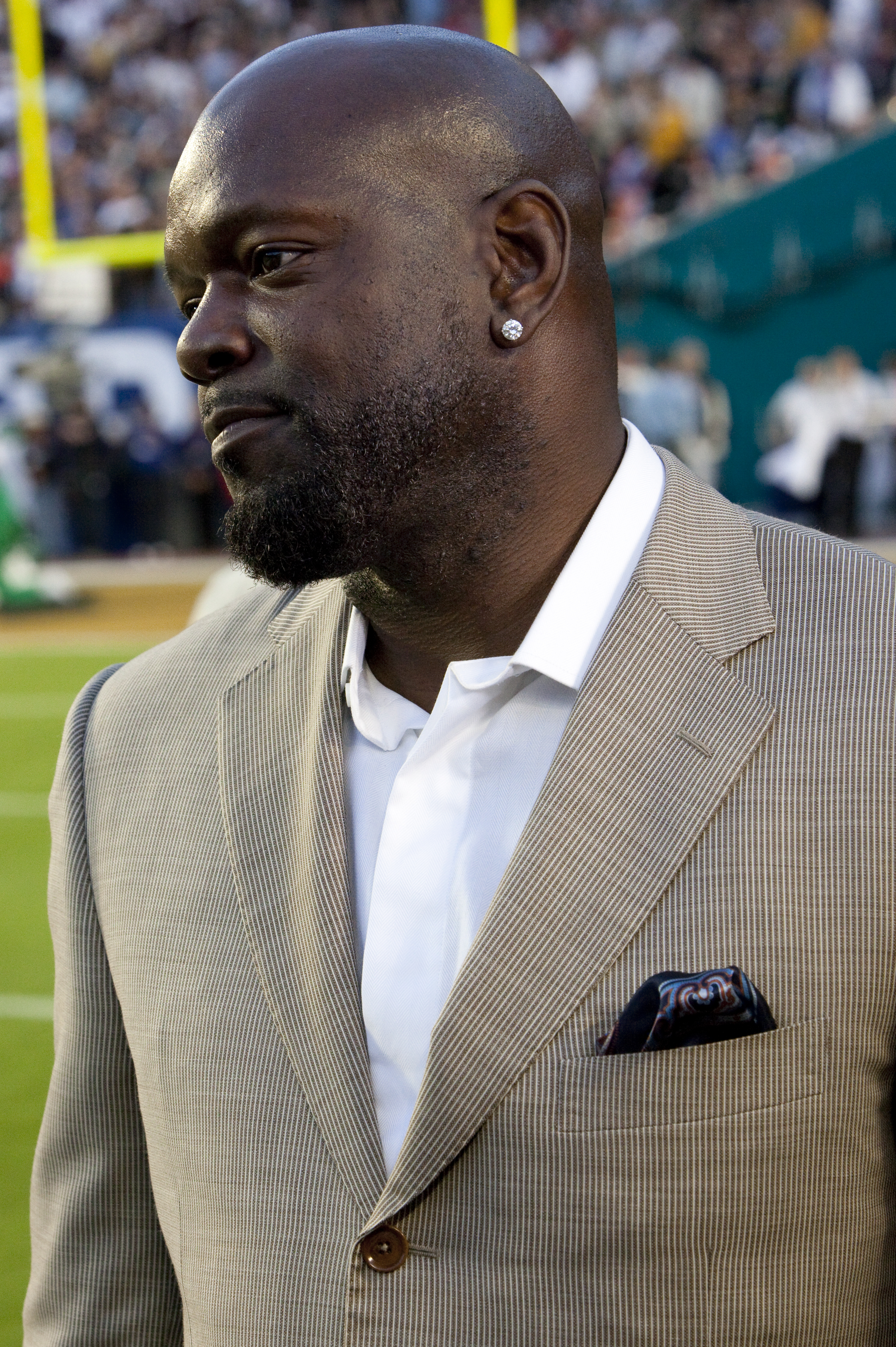
Emmitt Smith led the league three times and set the single-season record in 1995. He is also the all-time leader in career rushing touchdowns.

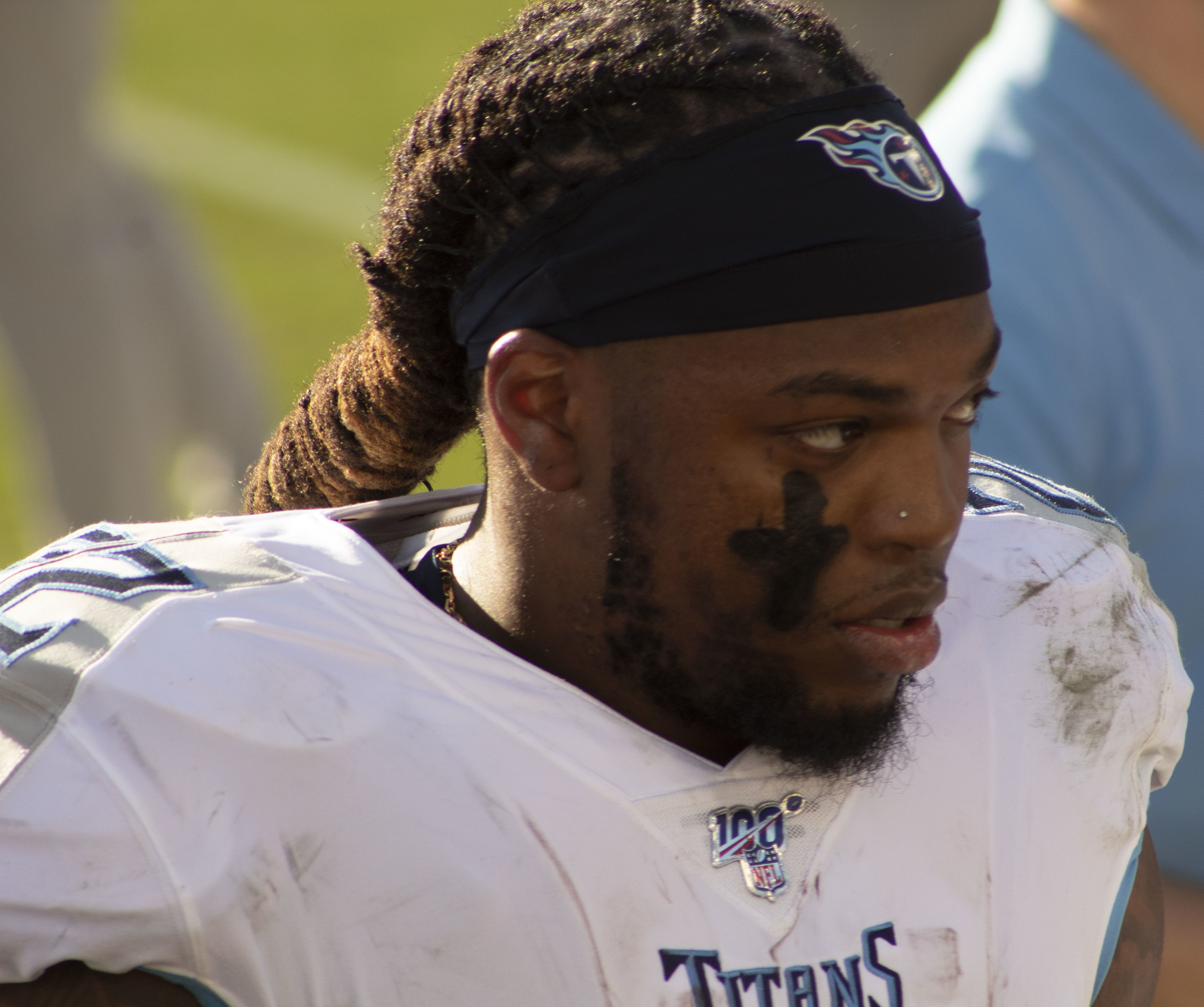
Derrick Henry led the league in back-to-back seasons in 2019 and 2020. He then did so again in 2024.

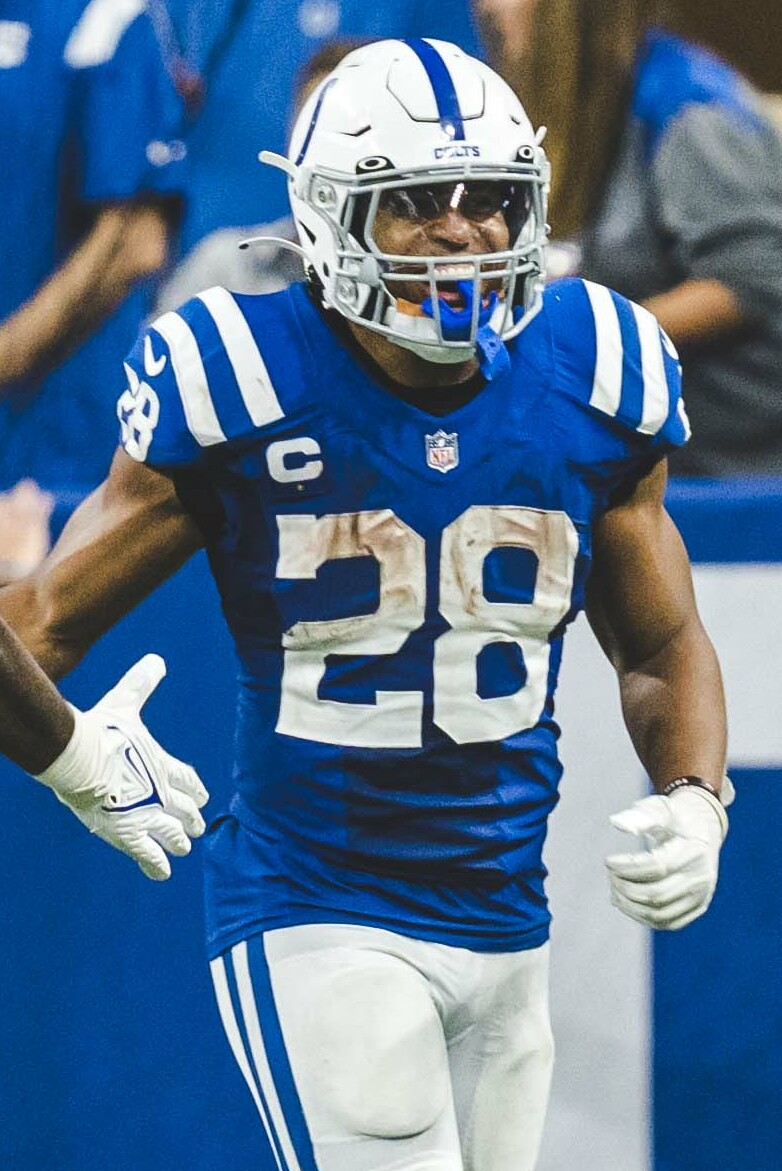
Jonathan Taylor led the league in rushing touchdowns in 2021, and most recently in 2025.

Key
Symbol	Meaning
Leader	The player who recorded the most rushing touchdowns in the NFL
TDs	The total number of rushing touchdowns the player had
GP	The number of games played by a player during the season (Note: The NFL did not have a set number of games for teams to play until the 1935 season, instead setting a minimum.)
†	Inducted into the Pro Football Hall of Fame
^	Active player
*	Set the single-season rushing touchdowns record
(#)	Denotes the number of times a player appears in this list

NFL annual rushing touchdowns leaders by season
Season	Leader	TDs	GP	Team	Refs
1932	Bronko Nagurski†	4*	14	Chicago Bears	
1933	Glenn Presnell	6*	11	Portsmouth Spartans	
1934	Dutch Clark†	8*	12	Detroit Lions	
1934	Beattie Feathers	8*	11	Chicago Bears	
1935	Ernie Caddel	6	12	Detroit Lions	
1936	Dutch Clark† (2)	7	12	Detroit Lions	
1937	Cliff Battles†	5	10	Washington Redskins	
1937	Dutch Clark† (3)	5	11	Detroit Lions	
1937	Clarke Hinkle†	5	11	Green Bay Packers	
1938	Andy Farkas	6	9	Washington Redskins	
1939	Johnny Drake	9*	11	Cleveland Rams	
1940	Johnny Drake (2)	9	11	Cleveland Rams	
1941	Hugh Gallarneau	8	11	Chicago Bears	
1942	Gary Famiglietti	8	10	Chicago Bears	
1943	Bill Paschal	10*	9	New York Giants	
1944	Bill Paschal (2)	9	10	New York Giants	
1945	Steve Van Buren†	15*	10	Philadelphia Eagles	
1946	Ted Fritsch	9	11	Green Bay Packers	
1947	Steve Van Buren† (2)	13	12	Philadelphia Eagles	
1948	Steve Van Buren† (3)	10	11	Philadelphia Eagles	
1949	Steve Van Buren† (4)	11	12	Philadelphia Eagles	
1950	Johnny Lujack	11	12	Chicago Bears	
1951	Rob Goode	9	12	Washington Redskins	
1952	Dan Towler	10	12	Los Angeles Rams	
1953	Joe Perry†	10	12	San Francisco 49ers	
1954	Dan Towler (2)	11	12	Los Angeles Rams	
1955	Alan Ameche	9	12	Baltimore Colts	
1956	Rick Casares	12	12	Chicago Bears	
1957	Jim Brown†	9	12	Cleveland Browns	
1958	Jim Brown† (2)	17*	12	Cleveland Browns	
1959	Jim Brown† (3)	14	12	Cleveland Browns	
1960	Paul Hornung†	13	12	Green Bay Packers	
1961	Jim Taylor†	15	14	Green Bay Packers	
1962	Jim Taylor† (2)	19*	14	Green Bay Packers	
1963	Jim Brown† (4)	12	14	Cleveland Browns	
1964	Lenny Moore†	16	14	Baltimore Colts	
1965	Jim Brown† (5)	17	14	Cleveland Browns	
1966	Leroy Kelly†	15	14	Cleveland Browns	
1967	Leroy Kelly† (2)	11	14	Cleveland Browns	
1968	Leroy Kelly† (3)	16	14	Cleveland Browns	
1969	Tom Matte	11	14	Baltimore Colts	
1970	MacArthur Lane	11	14	St. Louis Cardinals	
1971	Duane Thomas	11	11	Dallas Cowboys	
1972	Mercury Morris	12	14	Miami Dolphins	
1973	Floyd Little†	12	14	Denver Broncos	
1973	O. J. Simpson†	12	14	Buffalo Bills	
1974	Tom Sullivan	11	14	Philadelphia Eagles	
1975	Pete Banaszak	16	14	Oakland Raiders	
1975	O. J. Simpson† (2)	16	14	Buffalo Bills	
1976	Franco Harris†	14	14	Pittsburgh Steelers	
1977	Walter Payton†	14	14	Chicago Bears	
1978	David Sims	14	12	Seattle Seahawks	
1979	Earl Campbell†	19	16	Houston Oilers	
1980	Earl Campbell† (2)	13	15	Houston Oilers	
1980	Billy Sims	13	16	Detroit Lions	
1981	Chuck Muncie	19	15	San Diego Chargers	
1982	Marcus Allen†	11	9	Los Angeles Raiders	(Note: The 1982 season was reduced from 16 to 9 games due to a 57-day players' strike.)
1983	John Riggins†	24*	15	Washington Redskins	
1984	Eric Dickerson†	14	16	Los Angeles Rams	
1984	John Riggins† (2)	14	14	Washington Redskins	
1985	Joe Morris	21	16	New York Giants	
1986	George Rogers	18	15	Washington Redskins	
1987	Johnny Hector	11	11	New York Jets	
1987	Charles White	11	15	Los Angeles Rams	
1988	Greg Bell	16	16	Los Angeles Rams	
1989	Greg Bell (2)	15	16	Los Angeles Rams	
1990	Derrick Fenner	14	16	Seattle Seahawks	
1990	Cleveland Gary	14	15	Los Angeles Rams	
1991	Barry Sanders†	16	15	Detroit Lions	
1992	Emmitt Smith†	18	16	Dallas Cowboys	
1993	Marcus Allen† (2)	12	16	Kansas City Chiefs	
1994	Emmitt Smith† (2)	21	15	Dallas Cowboys	
1995	Emmitt Smith† (3)	25*	16	Dallas Cowboys	
1996	Terry Allen	21	16	Washington Redskins	
1997	Abdul-Karim al-Jabbar	15	16	Miami Dolphins	
1997	Terrell Davis†	15	15	Denver Broncos	
1998	Terrell Davis† (2)	21	16	Denver Broncos	
1999	Stephen Davis	17	14	Washington Redskins	
2000	Marshall Faulk†	18	14	St. Louis Rams	
2001	Shaun Alexander	14	16	Seattle Seahawks	
2002	Priest Holmes	21	14	Kansas City Chiefs	
2003	Priest Holmes (2)	27*	16	Kansas City Chiefs	
2004	LaDainian Tomlinson†	17	15	San Diego Chargers	
2005	Shaun Alexander (2)	27	16	Seattle Seahawks	
2006	LaDainian Tomlinson† (2)	28*	16	San Diego Chargers	
2007	LaDainian Tomlinson† (3)	15	16	San Diego Chargers	
2008	DeAngelo Williams	18	16	Carolina Panthers	
2009	Adrian Peterson	18	16	Minnesota Vikings	
2010	Arian Foster	16	16	Houston Texans	
2011	LeSean McCoy	17	15	Philadelphia Eagles	
2012	Arian Foster (2)	15	16	Houston Texans	
2013	Jamaal Charles	12	15	Kansas City Chiefs	
2013	Marshawn Lynch	12	16	Seattle Seahawks	
2014	Marshawn Lynch (2)	13	16	Seattle Seahawks	
2014	DeMarco Murray	13	16	Dallas Cowboys	
2015	Devonta Freeman	11	15	Atlanta Falcons	
2015	Jeremy Hill	11	16	Cincinnati Bengals	
2015	Adrian Peterson (2)	11	16	Minnesota Vikings	
2015	DeAngelo Williams (2)	11	16	Pittsburgh Steelers	
2016	LeGarrette Blount	18	16	New England Patriots	
2017	Todd Gurley	13	15	Los Angeles Rams	
2018	Todd Gurley (2)	17	14	Los Angeles Rams	
2019	Derrick Henry^	16	15	Tennessee Titans	
2019	Aaron Jones^	16	16	Green Bay Packers	
2020	Derrick Henry^ (2)	17	16	Tennessee Titans	
2021	Jonathan Taylor^	18	17	Indianapolis Colts	
2022	Jamaal Williams	17	17	Detroit Lions	
2023	Raheem Mostert	18	15	Miami Dolphins	
2024	James Cook^	16	16	Buffalo Bills	
2024	Jahmyr Gibbs^	16	17	Detroit Lions	
2024	Derrick Henry^ (3)	16	17	Baltimore Ravens	
2025	Jonathan Taylor^ (2)	18	17	Indianapolis Colts	

== AFL annual rushing touchdowns leaders ==
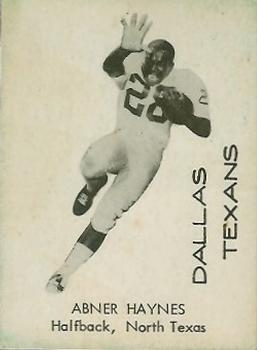
Abner Haynes led the AFL in rushing touchdowns three times and was the all-time leader in rushing touchdowns by an AFL player with 46 in his career of eight seasons.

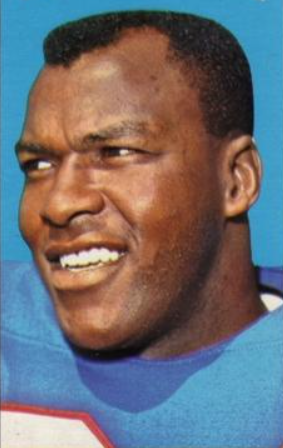
Cookie Gilchrist led the AFL in rushing touchdowns for four consecutive seasons, the first and so far only player to do so in pro football history. No player has led a league in rushing touchdowns four times since Gilchrist.

Key
Symbol	Meaning
Leader	The player who recorded the most rushing touchdowns in the AFL
TDs	The total number of rushing touchdowns the player had
GP	The number of games played by a player during the season
*	Player set the single-season rushing touchdowns record
(#)	Denotes the number of times a player appears in this list

AFL annual rushing touchdowns leaders by season
Season	Leader	TDs	GP	Team	Refs
1960	Abner Haynes	9*	14	Dallas Texans	
1961	Abner Haynes (2)	9	14	Dallas Texans	
1961	Paul Lowe	9	14	San Diego Chargers	
1962	Cookie Gilchrist	13*	14	Buffalo Bills	
1962	Abner Haynes (3)	13*	14	Dallas Texans	
1963	Cookie Gilchrist (2)	12	14	Buffalo Bills	
1964	Sid Blanks	6	14	Houston Oilers	
1964	Cookie Gilchrist (3)	6	14	Buffalo Bills	
1964	Daryle Lamonica	6	14	Buffalo Bills	
1965	Wray Carlton	6	14	Buffalo Bills	
1965	Cookie Gilchrist (4)	6	14	Denver Broncos	
1965	Paul Lowe (2)	6	14	San Diego Chargers	
1965	Curtis McClinton	6	14	Kansas City Chiefs	
1966	Jim Nance	11	14	Boston Patriots	
1967	Emerson Boozer	10	8	New York Jets	
1968	Paul Robinson	8	14	Cincinnati Bengals	
1969	Jim Kiick	9	14	Miami Dolphins	

== AAFC annual rushing touchdowns leaders ==
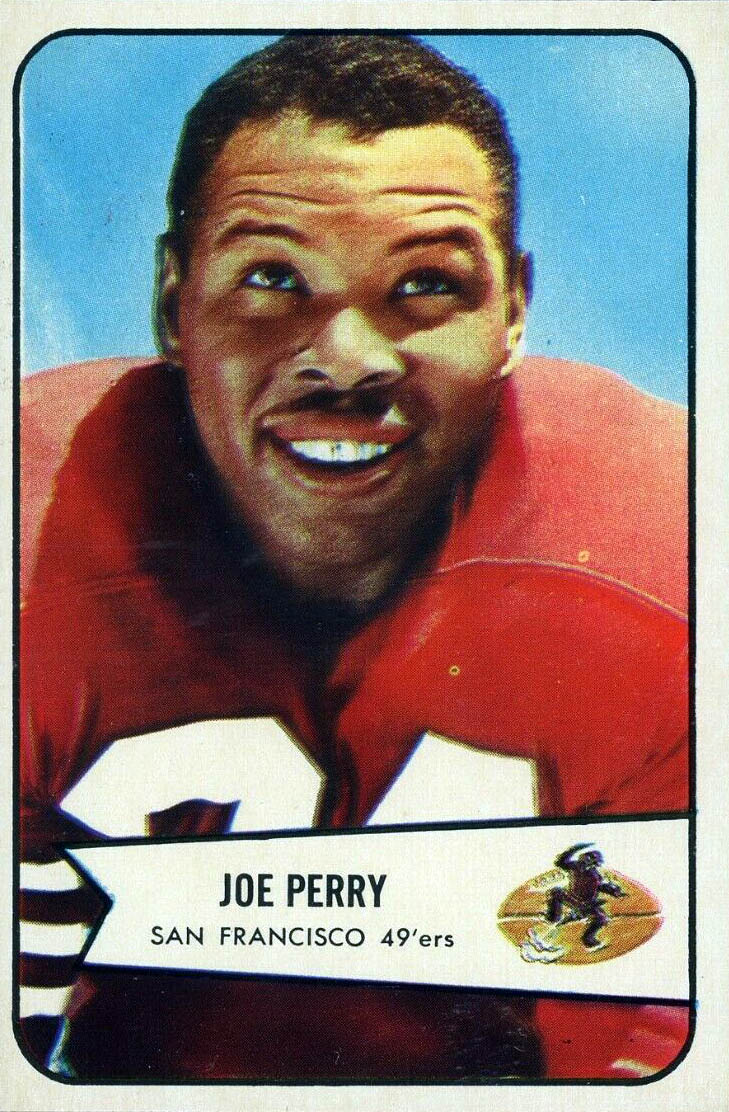
Joe Perry tied for the league lead in touchdowns in 1948 and 1949 before leading the NFL in the 1953 season to become the 3rd player in history to lead the league in touchdowns three times.

Key
Symbol	Meaning
Leader	The player who recorded the most rushing touchdowns in the AAFC
TDs	The total number of rushing touchdowns the player had
GP	The number of games played by a player during the season
†	Pro Football Hall of Fame member
*	Player set the single-season rushing touchdowns record
(#)	Denotes the number of times a player appears in this list

AAFC annual rushing touchdowns leaders by season
Season	Leader	TDs	GP	Team	Refs
1946	Len Eshmont	6*	10	San Francisco 49ers	
1946	Don Greenwood	6*	13	Cleveland Browns	
1946	John Kimbrough	6*	14	Los Angeles Dons	
1946	Spec Sanders	6*	13	New York Yankees	
1947	Spec Sanders (2)	18*	14	New York Yankees	
1948	Chet Mutryn	10	14	Buffalo Bills	
1948	Joe Perry†	10	14	San Francisco 49ers	
1949	Marion Motley†	8	11	Cleveland Browns	
1949	Joe Perry† (2)	8	11	San Francisco 49ers	

== Most seasons leading the league ==
Count	Player	Seasons	Team(s)	Refs
5	Jim Brown	1957–1959, 1963, 1965	Cleveland Browns	
4	Cookie Gilchrist	1962–1965	Buffalo Bills (3) / Denver Broncos (1)	
4	Steve Van Buren	1945, 1947–1949	Philadelphia Eagles	
3	Dutch Clark	1934, 1936, 1937	Detroit Lions	
3	Abner Haynes	1960–1962	Dallas Texans	
3	Derrick Henry	2019, 2020, 2024	Tennessee Titans (2) / Baltimore Ravens (1)	
3	Leroy Kelly	1966–1968	Cleveland Browns	
3	Joe Perry	1948, 1949, 1953 (Note: AAFC statistics for Perry's 1948-1949 seasons were not recognized by the NFL until 2025.)	San Francisco 49ers	
3	Emmitt Smith	1992, 1994, 1995	Dallas Cowboys	
3	LaDainian Tomlinson	2004, 2006, 2007	San Diego Chargers	
2	Shaun Alexander	2001, 2005	Seattle Seahawks	
2	Marcus Allen	1982, 1993	Los Angeles Raiders (1) / Kansas City Chiefs	
2	Greg Bell	1988, 1989	Los Angeles Rams	
2	Earl Campbell	1979, 1980	Houston Oilers	
2	Terrell Davis	1997, 1998	Denver Broncos	
2	Johnny Drake	1939, 1940	Cleveland Rams	
2	Arian Foster	2010, 2012	Houston Texans	
2	Todd Gurley	2017, 2018	Los Angeles Rams	
2	Priest Holmes	2002, 2003	Kansas City Chiefs	
2	Paul Lowe	1961, 1965	San Diego Chargers	
2	Marshawn Lynch	2013, 2014	Seattle Seahawks	
2	Bill Paschal	1943, 1944	New York Giants	
2	Adrian Peterson	2009, 2015	Minnesota Vikings	
2	John Riggins	1983, 1984	Washington Redskins	
2	Spec Sanders	1946, 1947	New York Yankees	
2	O. J. Simpson	1973, 1975	Buffalo Bills	
2	Jim Taylor	1961, 1962	Green Bay Packers	
2	Jonathan Taylor	2021, 2025	Indianapolis Colts	
2	Dan Towler	1952, 1954	Los Angeles Rams	
2	DeAngelo Williams	2008, 2015	Carolina Panthers (1) / Pittsburgh Steelers	

== See also ==
- List of NFL career rushing touchdowns leaders
- List of NFL annual rushing yards leaders
- List of NFL annual scoring leaders
