= 1943 NFL playoffs =

American football tournament

- Dates: December 19–26, 1943
- Season: 1943
- Teams: 3
- Games played: 2
- NFL Championship Game site: Wrigley Field; Chicago, Illinois
- Defending champions: Washington Redskins
- Champion: Chicago Bears (6th title)
- Runner-up: Washington Redskins
- Conference runners-up: New York Giants; Green Bay Packers
NFL playoffs
← 1941	1947 →

The 1943 National Football League season resulted in a tie for the Eastern Division championship between the New York Giants and Washington Redskins, requiring a one-game playoff to be played between them. This division championship game was played on December 19, 1943, at the Polo Grounds. The winner of that game then traveled to Chicago to play in the championship game against the Chicago Bears on December 26.

The Bears routed the Redskins by a 41–21 score to win their sixth league championship.

== Tournament bracket ==
Eastern Division playoff			NFL Championship
			W	Chicago Bears	41
E	Washington	28	E	Washington	21
E	New York	0

== Eastern Division championship ==
Washington Redskins 28, New York Giants 0

Quarter	1	2	3	4	Total
Redskins	0	14	0	14	28
Giants	0	0	0	0	0

at Polo Grounds in Manhattan, New York

- Date: December 19, 1943
- Pro-Football-Reference

Game information

- Second Quarter
- WAS – Andy Farkas 2-yard run (Masterson kick). Redskins 7–0
- WAS – Andy Farkas 2 run (Masterson kick). Redskins 14–0
- Fourth Quarter
- WAS – Andy Farkas 1 run (Masterson kick). Redskins 21–0
- WAS – Ted Lapka 11-yard pass from Sammy Baugh (Masterson kick). Redskins 28–0

Top passers

- WAS – Sammy Baugh – 16/21, 199 yards, 1 TD, 2 INT
- NYG – Tuffy Leemans – 2/10, 44 yards, 3 INT

Top rushers

- WAS – Andy Farkas – 22 rushes, 60 yards, 3 TD
- NYG – Bill Paschal – 16 rushes, 56 yards

Top receivers

- WAS – Bob Masterson – 5 receptions, 70 yards
- NYG – Ward Cuff – 2 receptions, 46 yards

Andy Farkas scored three touchdown runs in a 28–0 victory over the New York Giants. His 18 points scored in a playoff game was an NFL record for nine years.
