= Cookie (nickname) =

Cookie is the nickname of:

- Queen Elizabeth the Queen Mother (1900–2002), given by the Duchess of Windsor
- Cookie Belcher (born 1978), American basketball player
- Carlos Carrasco (baseball) (born 1987), Venezuelan-born Major League Baseball pitcher
- Charles Cook (dancer) (1914–1991), American tap dancer
- Cookie Cunningham (1905–1995), American football player, basketball player and basketball coach
- Cookie Cuccurullo (1918–1983), Major League Baseball pitcher
- Cookie Gilchrist (1935–2011), American Football League and Canadian Football League player
- Cookiee Kawaii (born 1993), American singer
- Howard Krongard (1940–2023), head of the Office of the Inspector General of the Department of State under President George W. Bush
- Cookie Lavagetto (1912–1990), Major League Baseball player, manager and coach
- Les Long (1915–1944), British Second World War pilot and prisoner of war executed for participating in the "Great Escape"
- Cookie Mueller (1949–1989), American actress and writer
- Cookie Rojas (born 1939), Cuban-born former Major League Baseball player
- Maureen "Cookie" Rowan (1949–1971), formerly unidentified American murder victim known as "Little Miss Lake Panasoffkee."
- Cookie Tackwell (1907–1953), National Football League player
- Huey Thierry (1936–1997), American musician and leader of Cookie and his Cupcakes
