= Cookie Monster (disambiguation) =

Cookie Monster is a character on the children's television show Sesame Street.

Cookie Monster may also refer to:

== People ==
- Daniel Brière (born 1977), French-Canadian hockey player nicknamed "Cookie Monster" by announcer Rick Jeanneret
- Carla Esparza (born 1987), American female mix martial artist nicknamed "Cookie Monster"
- Evil Elmo

== Arts, entertainment, and media ==
- Cookie Monster, a nickname for death growl vocals
- The Cookie Monster (novella), a 2004 Hugo Award-winning novella by Vernor Vinge
- "The Cookie Monster", a song by Fred Wesley and Horny Horns from the compilation album The Final Blow

== Foods ==
- Cookie Monster, a cookie-ice cream dessert at American restaurants Cheddar's
- Cookie Monster cookies, a brand of Sesame Street snacks manufactured by Keebler

== Other uses ==
- Cookie Monster (computer program), a 1969 malware that was written for several operating systems
- Oreopithecus bambolii, an extinct species of hominid nicknamed "Cookie Monster"
