= James Cook (running back) =

American football player (born 1999)

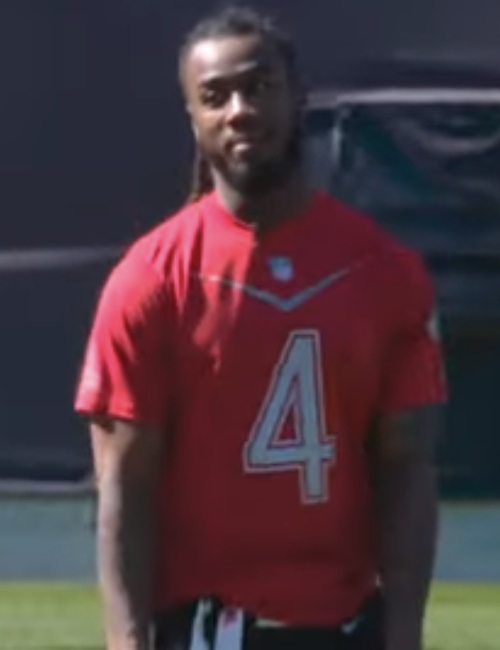
- Cook in 2024

No. 4 – Buffalo Bills
- Position: Running back
- Roster status: Active

Personal information
- Born: September 25, 1999 (age 27); Miami, Florida, U.S.
- Listed height: 5 ft 11 in (1.80 m)
- Listed weight: 190 lb (86 kg)

Career information
- High school: Miami Central (West Little River, Florida)
- College: Georgia (2018–2021)
- NFL draft: 2022: 2nd round, 63rd overall pick

Career history
- Buffalo Bills (2022–present)

Awards and highlights
- Second-team All-Pro (2025); 3× Pro Bowl (2023–2025); NFL rushing yards leader (2025); NFL rushing touchdowns leader (2024 (Note: Tied with Derrick Henry and Jahmyr Gibbs)); CFP national champion (2021)

Career NFL statistics as of Week 11, 2026
- Rushing yards: 5,319
- Rushing average: 5.1
- Rushing touchdowns: 42
- Receptions: 144
- Receiving yards: 1,287
- Receiving touchdowns: 9
- Stats at Pro Football Reference

James Dalvin Cook III (born September 25, 1999) is an American professional football running back for the Buffalo Bills of the National Football League (NFL). He played college football for the Georgia Bulldogs, winning a national championship with them in 2021, and was selected by the Bills in the second round of the 2022 NFL draft.

Cook has earned the nickname "Captain Cook" which is a reference to British explorer and Naval Officer James Cook.

After becoming Buffalo's lead tailback, Cook became the team's first rusher to attain over 1,000 yards in a single season since 2017, as well as scoring 16 rushing touchdowns in a single season (tying a franchise record set in 1975) and earning three Pro Bowl nominations and a second-team All-Pro award. In 2025, Cook led the NFL in rushing yards with 1,621, becoming the team's first player to lead the league in rushing since 1976. He is the younger brother of former NFL running back Dalvin Cook.

== Early life ==
Cook grew up in Miami, Florida, and attended Miami Central Senior High School. He rushed for 709 yards and eight touchdowns on 99 carries as a freshman. After his freshman year, Cook took extra courses and reclassified from a sophomore to a junior. As a senior, he rushed for 782 yards and 10 touchdowns on 91 carries. Cook rushed for 2,019 yards and 30 touchdowns during his high school career.

Cook was a highly rated recruit and initially committed to play college football at Florida State, where his brother was playing, after his freshman year of high school. However, Cook later decommitted during the summer before his senior year. Cook later signed a letter of intent to play at Georgia after considering offers from Louisville and Florida. Cook transferred to Miami Northwestern Senior High School after his senior football season for his final semester of high school. Cook finished high school as a four-star recruit.

== College career ==
Cook played in 13 games as a freshman and gained 284 yards and scored two touchdowns on 41 carries with eight receptions for 89 yards.

As a sophomore, Cook played in all 14 of Georgia's games and rushed 31 times for 188 yards and two touchdowns while also catching 16 passes for 132 yards.

In 2020, Cook was the team's second-leading rusher with 303 yards and three touchdowns on 45 carries and caught 16 passes for 225 yards and two touchdowns. He missed the 2021 Peach Bowl following his father's death.

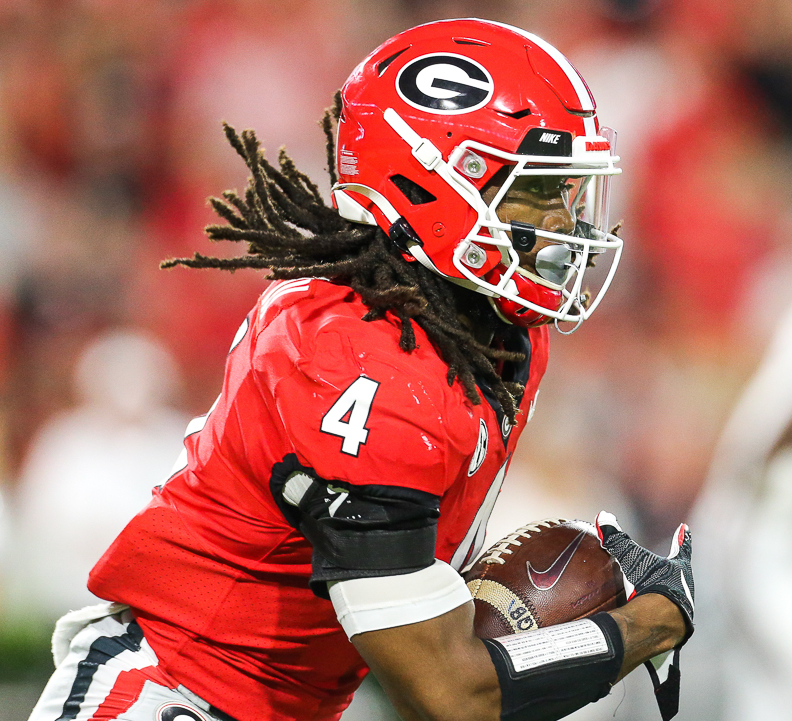
Cook in 2021

Cook rushed for 728 yards and seven touchdowns and caught 27 passes for 284 yards and four touchdowns as a senior as the Bulldogs won the 2022 College Football Playoff National Championship. He was the leading receiver for Georgia with 112 yards and one touchdown on four receptions in the team's 34–11 victory over Michigan in the Orange Bowl semifinal game.

After the end of the season, Cook declared that he would be entering the 2022 NFL draft.

== Professional career ==
Pre-draft measurables
Height	Weight	Arm length	Hand span	Wingspan	40-yard dash	10-yard split	20-yard split	Vertical jump	Broad jump
5 ft 11 in (1.80 m)	199 lb (90 kg)	30 3/4 in (0.78 m)	9 3/8 in (0.24 m)	6 ft 4 1/4 in (1.94 m)	4.42 s	1.55 s	2.59 s	33.0 in (0.84 m)	10 ft 4 in (3.15 m)
All values from NFL Combine

=== 2022 season ===
Cook was selected by the Buffalo Bills in the second round (63rd overall) of the 2022 NFL draft. On May 16, Cook signed his a rookie contract, a four-year deal worth $5.8 million, with $2.9 million guaranteed. In Week 1, Cook made his NFL debut against the Los Angeles Rams. On his first career carry, Cook fumbled after a two-yard gain. He did not receive another offensive touch for the remainder of the game. During Week 5 against the Pittsburgh Steelers, Cook scored his first professional touchdown on a 24-yard rush in the 38–3 victory. During Week 13 against the New England Patriots, he had 105 scrimmage yards in the 24–10 victory.

Cook finished his rookie year with 89 carries for 507 yards and two touchdowns to go along with 21 receptions for 180 yards and a touchdown in 16 games and no starts. Cook scored a rushing touchdown in the 34–31 Wild Card Round victory over the Miami Dolphins.

=== 2023 season ===
Cook became Buffalo's primary running back for the 2023 season with previous starter Devin Singletary departing for the Houston Texans in free agency, though goal-line and pass protection snaps went to newly-signed veteran Latavius Murray. Against the Dallas Cowboys in Week 15, Cook attained career highs in several single-game categories, including rush attempts (25), rush yards (179), total scrimmage yards (221), and total touchdowns (2), as the Bills routed Dallas 31–10. He earned AFC Offensive Player of the Week honors for his performance. The following week against the Los Angeles Chargers, Cook surpassed 1,000 rushing yards on the season, becoming the first Bills running back to do so since LeSean McCoy (2017).

Cook finished his second professional season with 237 carries for 1,122 yards and two touchdowns to go with 44 receptions for 445 yards and four touchdowns in 17 games and 13 starts. Cook had eight games on the season with at least 100 scrimmage yards, and earned Pro Bowl honors for the first time.

=== 2024 season ===
During Week 2, Cook had two rushing touchdowns and a receiving touchdown in the 31–10 victory over the Dolphins, earning him AFC Offensive Player of the Week honors. During Week 8 against the Seattle Seahawks, Cook had 133 scrimmage yards and two rushing touchdowns in the 31–10 road victory. During Week 15 against the Detroit Lions, he had 133 scrimmage yards and two rushing touchdowns in the 48–42 road victory. In the next game against the Patriots, he had 126 scrimmage yards, a rushing touchdown, and a receiving touchdown during the 24–21 victory.

For the season, Cook rushed for 16 touchdowns, which tied a franchise record set by O.J. Simpson (1975) for most rushing touchdowns in a single season. Cook also tied with Derrick Henry and Jahmyr Gibbs (each with 16) as the 2024 NFL rushing touchdowns leader, and earned Pro Bowl honors for the second time. In the Wild Card Round against the Denver Broncos, Cook had 23 carries for 120 yards and a touchdown during the 31–7 victory. During the AFC Championship Game against the Kansas City Chiefs, he had 134 scrimmage yards and two rushing touchdowns in the 32–29 road loss. Cook was ranked 89th by his fellow players on the NFL Top 100 Players of 2025.

=== 2025 season ===
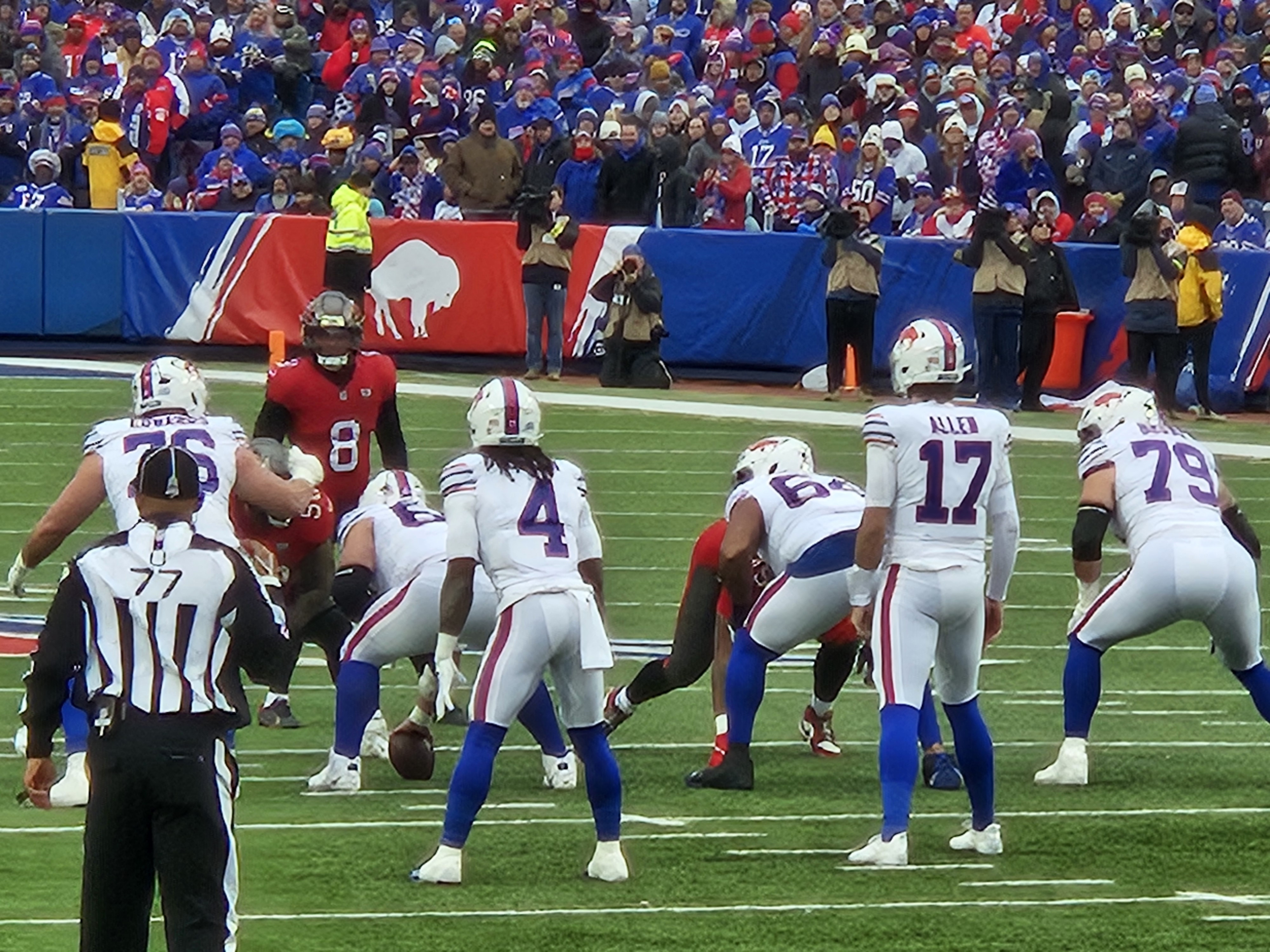
Cook (#4) lining up in the backfield for Buffalo next to Josh Allen in 2025

On August 13, 2025, after a short holdout from practice, Cook and the Bills reached agreement on a four-year, $48 million contract extension.

For the first four weeks of the season, Cook had 100+ total yards and made a rushing touchdown in each game, all of which resulted in wins for the team. For his efforts in these first four games, Cook earned AFC Offensive Player of the Month honors. During Week 8 against the Carolina Panthers, Cook rushed for a career-high 216 yards and two touchdowns on 19 carries in the 40–9 victory. Against the Browns on December 21, Cook had 100 rushing yards in the first half to get over 1,500 yards on the season, the third best season by a running back in franchise history and most since O. J. Simpson in 1975. He earned Pro Bowl honors for the third straight season. Cook won the rushing title to become the first Bill to do so in 49 years. Cook was ranked 20th by his fellow players on the NFL Top 100 Players of 2026, up 69 spots from the previous season.

== Career statistics ==
Legend
	Led the league
**Bold**	Career high

=== NFL ===
==== Regular season ====
Year	Team	Games		Rushing					Receiving					Fumbles	
Year	Team	GP	GS	Att	Yds	Y/A	Lng	TD	Rec	Yds	Y/R	Lng	TD	Fum	Lost
2022	BUF	16	0	89	507	**5.7**	33	2	21	180	8.6	41	1	1	1
2023	BUF	17	13	237	1,122	4.7	42	2	**44**	**445**	**10.1**	48	**4**	4	2
2024	BUF	16	16	207	1,009	4.9	65	**16**	32	258	8.1	28	2	1	0
2025	BUF	17	17	**309**	**1,621**	5.2	64	12	33	291	8.8	**51**	2	**6**	**3**
2026	BUF	10	10	209	1,060	5.1	**74**	10	14	113	8.1	26	0	4	2
Career		76	56	1,051	5,319	5.1	74	42	144	1,287	8.9	51	9	16	8

==== Postseason ====
Year	Team	Games		Rushing					Receiving					Fumbles	
Year	Team	GP	GS	Att	Yds	Y/A	Lng	TD	Rec	Yds	Y/R	Lng	TD	Fum	Lost
2022	BUF	2	0	17	52	3.1	13	1	0	0	0.0	0	0	0	0
2023	BUF	2	2	36	140	3.9	12	0	**8**	26	3.3	8	0	0	0
2024	BUF	3	3	**53**	**272**	**5.1**	**33**	**3**	6	**64**	**10.7**	23	0	0	0
2025	BUF	2	2	39	163	4.2	24	0	4	29	7.3	**24**	0	**1**	**1**
Career		9	7	145	627	4.3	33	4	18	119	6.6	24	0	1	1

=== College ===
Year	Team	GP	Rushing				Receiving			
Year	Team	GP	Att	Yds	Avg	TD	Rec	Yds	Avg	TD
2018	Georgia	13	41	284	**6.9**	2	8	89	11.1	0
2019	Georgia	14	31	188	6.1	2	16	132	8.3	0
2020	Georgia	8	45	303	6.7	3	16	225	**14.1**	2
2021	Georgia	15	**113**	**728**	6.4	**7**	**27**	**284**	10.5	**4**
Career		50	230	1,503	6.5	14	67	730	10.9	6

== Personal life ==
Cook was arrested by Athens police in December 2019 for driving with an open alcohol container and driving without a valid license.

In July 2020, Cook crashed into five unoccupied parked cars near downtown Athens. Moments before, according to police, Cook was traveling up to 85 mph, nearly striking an oncoming vehicle. Athens-Clark County deputy solicitor Janna Landreth offered to drop additional charges in the case if Cook pleaded guilty to reckless driving, for which Cook would have to pay a $670 fine, supply financial restitution to at-most two of the five damaged vehicles, and complete a defensive-driving course. Cook subsequently failed to appear in court relating to this case, for which Georgia Bulldogs football Director of Player Support Bryant Gantt claimed responsibility. Cook was not penalized for the missed date.
