= Cookie (novel) =

2008 novel by Jacqueline Wilson

- "Cookie" official book cover designed by Nick Sharratt
- Author: Jacqueline Wilson
- Illustrator: Nick Sharratt
- Cover artist: Nick Sharratt
- Language: English
- Genre: Children's novel
- Publisher: Doubleday
- Publication date: October 9, 2008 (hardcover) July 2, 2009 (paperback)
- Publication place: United Kingdom
- Media type: Print (Hardback)
- Pages: 320pp

Cookie is a children's novel written by English author Jacqueline Wilson, published in October 2008 by Doubleday. It is illustrated by Nick Sharratt. The book was released on 9 October 2008.

The book was age-banded (as "9+") by the publisher, despite Wilson's opposition to the practice.

== Plot ==
Despite her name, 11 year-old Beauty Cookson is a plain, timid girl who is nicknamed "ugly" by her peers at school, especially by her main bully, Skye. Worse than the teasing in the playground, though, is the unpredictable criticism from her emotionally abusive father, Gerry Cookson. She is frequently berated for breaking any of his house rules, as well as for her lack of looks and confidence, even though she is a wealthy girl who lives in a large, beautifully decorated house and attends a private school. Her main source of kindness at home is her mother, Dilys "Dilly" Cookson. Beauty adores rabbits, although Gerry forbids her from having pets. Her favorite television show is "Rabbit Hutch", a show for young children about a man, Sam, and his pet rabbit, Lily.

Beauty has no friends at all at school. The only student that is nice to her is Rhona, Skye's closest friend. However, Rhona wishes to be friends with Beauty instead, which she reveals one day when Skye is at a dentist appointment. Finally, Beauty is invited to a birthday party Rhona is holding. For the birthday party, Gerry forces her to get corkscrew curls, and popular bullies Skye, Arabella and Emily develop a new nickname for her: Ugly Corkscrew. The ringlets are ultimately spoiled when Skye dunks Beauty underwater in Rhona's pool, and Gerry claims Beauty looks uglier than ever.

Beauty tells her mother about the teasing and Dilly decides to learn how to bake cookies, even though Gerry calls her a bad cook, in the hope that Beauty will be given a new nickname, Cookie (a play on her surname, Cookson). Gradually, both Beauty and Dilly get the hang of making cookies and become very good at it. Gerry refuses to acknowledge any of this or try any of the cookies, completely doubting Dilly's ability to cook anything at all.

Beauty's birthday is approaching and she is dreading it, however Gerry appears to turn over a new leaf and act like an ideal father. Gerry arranges a birthday feast and organizes tickets for all of the girls in her class to see a stage musical called 'Birthday Bonanza', with a chauffeur-driven limousine to escort them there. Her mother buys a beautiful Victorian-style dress for her, and Beauty invites all the girls, including Skye. Rhona gives Beauty a pet rabbit, which she names 'Birthday'. The party soon becomes miserable due to Gerry's actions; Dilly decides to give out cookies that she baked but Gerry spitefully crushes them into crumbs, and when Beauty feels too shy to go on the stage at the 'Birthday Bonanza' show (which is supposed to celebrate people's birthdays by inviting the birthday kids onstage), Gerry shouts at her in the limousine.

At home, Dilly and Beauty find Birthday decapitated, and Gerry suggests a fox killed the rabbit after he deliberately let him out of his hutch. Dilly then decides to separate from Gerry, and she and Beauty pack their things and leave the house. The two drive to Gerry's first wife, Avril, who treats the two kindly but at first looks down upon Dilly's decision to leave Gerry, saying that she has "deliberately made herself homeless". She lets them stay for the night, and Dilly decides to take Beauty on a holiday. The holiday resort to which they go is called Rabbit Cove, which Beauty chooses due to her love of rabbits. They find their way to an idyllic seaside resort run by a kind older man named Mike, a painter who takes Dilly on as a breakfast chef in his B&B.

Dilly decides to let Gerry know where they are, despite Beauty's objections, but after he shouts at her and calls her a "useless aging dumb blonde," she terminates the call. Gerry tracks them down, and yells at them in front of the customers at the café, even going as far as to accuse Dilly of having an affair with Mike and then punches him in the nose, before driving off. Even though Dilly is living with Mike and he expresses interest in dating her, Dilly refuses, at least for the time being, as she wants to be independent; Mike respects her choice.

Just before summer, Dilly arranges for Beauty to go to a new school. She is adamantly against the idea at first, but eventually agrees. At school she makes friends and is nicknamed the Cookie Girl, but still keeps in touch with Rhona by writing letters. Beauty is asked to go on 'Watchbox', a talent show that Skye wanted to be on, due to the rise in popularity of her mother's cookies. As a treat, the producers of Watchbox invite Sam, who tells Beauty that his rabbit, Lily, is pregnant, and Sam offers to give Beauty her own baby rabbit.

== Characters ==
- Beauty Cookson: Main character; she is a timid but kind girl, who adores rabbits and a kids show called "Sam and Lily in the Rabbit Hutch" which stars Sam and his pet rabbit Lily.
- Dilly Cookson: Beauty's caring mother who struggles to stand up to her cruel husband, but does her best with looking after Beauty.
- Gerry Cookson: Beauty's emotionally abusive and controlling father who became a financially successful property developer from hard work, and is obsessed with flaunting his wealth.
- Rhona Marshall: A classmate who is nice to Beauty and wishes to be best friends with her rather than Skye.
- Skye Wortley: A rude girl in Beauty's class who takes pleasure in bullying Beauty and calling her nasty names like "Ugly".
- Sam: The star of Beauty's favorite TV show "Rabbit Hutch".
- Lily: Sam's pet rabbit and costar of "Rabbit Hutch" .
- Mike: A kind painter who owns a B&B House on Rabbit Cove and takes Beauty and Dilly under his wing.
- Avril: Gerry's first ex wife.
- Princess: Beauty's classmate and friend at Seahaven.

== Audiobook ==
A BBC audiobook was released in the same month as the novel, read by Finty Williams.

== Legacy ==
Beauty, Mike (now 'Uncle Mike'), and Dilly, appear in The Seaside Sleepover (2025), the third book in the Sleepovers series. Dilly now runs a shop selling cookies.
