= Cookie Gilchrist =

American gridiron football player (1935–2011)

No. 27, 85, 91, 21, 34, 2, 30
- Position: Fullback

Personal information
- Born: May 25, 1935; Brackenridge, Pennsylvania, U.S.
- Died: January 10, 2011 (aged 75); Pittsburgh, Pennsylvania, U.S.
- Listed height: 6 ft 3 in (1.91 m)
- Listed weight: 251 lb (114 kg)

Career information
- High school: Har-Brack (Natrona Heights, Pennsylvania)
- College: None
- NFL draft: 1954: undrafted

Career history
- Cleveland Browns (1954)*; Sarnia Imperials (1954); Kitchener-Waterloo Dutchmen (1955); Hamilton Tiger-Cats (1956–1957); Saskatchewan Roughriders (1958); Toronto Argonauts (1959–1961); Buffalo Bills (1962–1964); Denver Broncos (1965); Miami Dolphins (1966); Denver Broncos (1967)
- * Offseason or practice squad member only

Awards and highlights
- AFL champion (1964); Grey Cup champion (1957); ORFU All-Star (1955); 4× CFL East All-Star (1956–1957, 1959–1960); CFL West All-Star (1958); AFL Most Valuable Player (1962); 3× First-team All-AFL (1962, 1964, 1965); Second-team All-AFL (1963); 4× AFL All-Star (1962–1965); 2× AFL rushing yards leader (1962, 1964); 4× AFL rushing touchdowns leader (1962–1965) (Note: Co-leader in the 1962, 1964 and 1965 seasons.); AFL All-Time Second-team; Buffalo Bills Wall of Fame

Career AFL statistics
- Rushing yards: 4,293
- Rushing average: 4.3
- Rushing touchdowns: 37
- Receptions: 110
- Receiving yards: 1,135
- Receiving touchdowns: 6
- Stats at Pro Football Reference

Career CFL statistics
- Rushing yards: 4,914
- Rushing average: 5.8
- Rushing touchdowns: 28
- Receiving yards: 1,068
- Receiving touchdowns: 5

Carlton Chester "Cookie" Gilchrist (May 25, 1935 – January 10, 2011) was an American football fullback who played in the American Football League (AFL) and the Canadian Football League (CFL). A combined ten-time All-Star (six Canadian, four American), Gilchrist ran for over 9,000 yards in professional football and won a Grey Cup with the Hamilton Tiger-Cats and AFL championship with the Buffalo Bills. He was named the AFL Most Valuable Player with Buffalo in 1962, where he was the first 1,000-yard rusher in AFL history. He was named to the AFL All-Time Second-team.

== Career ==
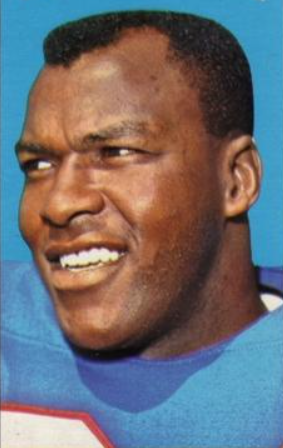
1965 Topps card of Gilchrist

A star player at Har-Brack High School in Natrona Heights, Pennsylvania, in 1953 he led the team to the W.P.I.A.L. co-championship with Donora. As a junior, he was talked into signing a professional football contract with the NFL's Cleveland Browns by Paul Brown. The signing was against NFL rules and likely illegal, and when Brown reneged on his promise that Gilchrist would make the team, Gilchrist left training camp at Hiram College, in Hiram, Ohio, and went to Canada to play. There, in the Ontario Rugby Football Union (ORFU), he received the Jim Shanks (Team MVP) Trophy for the Sarnia Imperials in 1954, and the Kitchener-Waterloo Dutchmen's Team MVP Award in 1955.

In 1956, he joined the Canadian Football League (CFL) with the Hamilton Tiger-Cats, helping lead them to a 1957 Grey Cup victory. Gilchrist later claimed that after the season ended, the Browns inquired about his services. However, when they told him to stop dating the woman he was seeing (who was white), he declined. He spent one season with the Saskatchewan Roughriders, rushing for 1,254 yards. He then was traded to the Toronto Argonauts for Tex Schwierer, and played three years in Toronto. In his six years in the CFL, Gilchrist was a divisional All-Star at running back five consecutive years from 1956 to 1960 (there were no All-Canadians selected in those years) and was also an Eastern All-Star at linebacker in 1960. Additionally, in 1960 he was runner up for the CFL's Most Outstanding Player Award. In his CFL career, Gilchrist recorded 4,911 rushing yards, 1,068 receiving yards and 12 interceptions.

Gilchrist then joined the roster of the Buffalo Bills of the fledgling American Football League. Incidentally, Gilchrist was Buffalo's backup plan: they had actually drafted Ernie Davis to be the team's franchise running back in 1962. Davis instead chose the NFL, but died of leukemia before ever playing a down of professional football. The Bills instead signed Gilchrist as a free agent. While with Buffalo, Gilchrist played fullback and kicked, though he insisted he could have played both ways. He was the first 1,000-yard American Football League rusher, with 1,096 yards in a 14-game schedule in 1962. That year, he set the all-time AFL record for touchdowns with 13, and he earned AFL MVP honors. Gilchrist rushed for a professional football record 263 yards and five touchdowns in a single game against the New York Jets in 1963. That year saw him almost record a 1,000-yard season before a 44-yard run of his was nullifed by a penalty in the last game of the season. Although he was with the Bills for only three years (1962–1964), he remains the team's ninth-leading rusher all-time, and led the league in scoring in each of his three years as a Bill. Gilchrist was so focused on football that according to teammate Paul Maguire, prior to the pivotal season finale game in 1964, Gilchrist stood up in the tense locker room and said, "I'm going to tell you something. If we don't win this game, I'm going to beat the s--- out of everybody in this locker room." Apparently, when the coaches came into the locker room right after he had said that, Gilchrist added, "And I'm going to start with you, Coach. I'm going to kick your ass first." Gilchrist ran for 122 yards in the Bills' 1964 American Football League championship defeat of the San Diego Chargers, 20–7. His 4.5 yard/rush average is second as a Bill only to O.J. Simpson. One of Gilchrist's strengths was blocking. Gilchrist's blocking was mentioned by broadcaster and ex-coach John Madden during a CBS TV broadcast in the 1987 season, saying "Cookie Gilchrist may have been the best blocking running back that ever played the game."

In an early civil rights victory for black athletes, Gilchrist led a successful boycott of New Orleans as the site of the 1965 American Football League All-Star game. He is the only athlete to turn down being enshrined into the Canadian Football Hall of Fame and Museum, because of what he described as racism and exploitation by management. However, Gilchrist had stated before his death that he never turned down the Hall, instead stating that it was "not that simple". When he was informed about being nominated by the Hall by John Agro (counsel for the Canadian Football League Players Association), he was told to be "nice" to Jake Gaudaur, the CFL commissioner, and Gilchrist stated that he would "take it under advisement" due to his strained relations with Gaudaur while also expressing the belief that Canada had treated him as a "persona non grata" from 1956 to 2010.

Gilchrist frequently was at odds with team management. He told a reporter from the London Free Press that most of the problems he encountered were a result of his standing up for principles at a time when black athletes were expected to remain silent.

Gilchrist was traded to the Denver Broncos before the 1965 season in exchange for fullback Billy Joe and cash. He played for the Broncos in 1965 and 1967, and for the Miami Dolphins in 1966. He was sent to the man who started his career, Paul Brown, in the Cincinnati Bengals expansion draft in 1968, but retired because of knee problems. He was an American Football League All-Star in 1962, 1963, 1964 and 1965, making him one of only a few professional football players who made their league's All-Star team for 10 consecutive years (six in the CFL, and four in the AFL). Gilchrist was selected as the fullback of the All-Time American Football League Team. The Professional Football Researchers Association named Gilchrist to the PRFA Hall of Very Good Class of 2013.

Gilchrist was named to the Bills' Wall of Fame during the team's home game on October 29, 2017, against the Oakland Raiders.

== Career regular season statistics ==
General			Rushing					Receiving					Field goals & converts						Interceptions				
Year	Team	GP	Att	Yds	Avg	Lng	TD	Rec	Yds	Avg	Lng	TD	FGA	FGM	Avg	S	XPA	XPM	Int	Yds	Avg	Lng	TD
1954	Sarnia Imperials	11	118	845	7.1	--	5	9	185	20.5	--	3	--	--	--	--	--	--	--	--	--	-	--
1955	Kitchener Dutchmen	12	129	806	6.2	--	10	11	179	16.2	--	0	16	5	31.2	--	--	--	--	--	--	--	--
1956	Hamilton Tiger-Cats	—	130	832	6.4	70	2	18	297	15.5	40	2	0	0	0	1	0	0	2	7	3.5	6	0
1957	Hamilton Tiger-Cats	—	204	958	4.7	57	7	8	82	10.3	19	0	0	0	0	1	0	0	3	65	21.7	55	2
1958	Saskatchewan Roughriders	—	235	1,254	5.3	73	5	15	144	9.6	41	0	0	0	0	0	0	0	0	0	0	0	0
1959	Toronto Argonauts	—	87	496	5.7	69	4	5	70	14.0	38	1	14	9	64.3	0	24	16	4	66	16.5	32	0
1960	Toronto Argonauts	14	88	662	7.5	74	6	25	346	13.8	42	2	18	5	27.8	0	48	43	1	16	16.0	16	0
1961	Toronto Argonauts	12	105	709	6.8	67	3	15	147	9.8	24	0	9	5	55.6	3	11	5	2	41	20.5	35	0
1962	Buffalo Bills	14	214	1,096	5.1	44	13	24	319	13.3	76	2	20	8	40	0	17	14	0	0	0	0	0
1963	Buffalo Bills	14	232	979	4.2	32	12	24	211	8.8	42	2	0	0	0	0	0	0	0	0	0	0	0
1964	Buffalo Bills	14	230	981	4.3	67	6	30	345	11.5	37	0	0	0	0	0	0	0	0	0	0	0	0
1965	Denver Broncos	14	252	954	3.8	44	6	18	154	8.6	29	10	0	0	0	0	0	0	0	0	0	0	0
1966	Miami Dolphins	8	72	262	3.6	22	0	13	110	8.5	22	1	0	0	0	0	0	0	0	0	0	0	0
1967	Denver Broncos	1	10	21	2.1	6	0	1	-4	-4.0	-4	0	0	0	0	0	0	0	0	0	0	0	0
CFL Totals		—	849	4,911	5.8	74	28	86	1,068	12.4	42	5	41	19	46.3	4	83	64	12	195	16.3	55	2
AFL Totals		65	1,010	4,293	4.3	67	37	110	1,135	10.3	76	6	20	8	40.0	0	17	14	0	0	0	0	0
Career totals		—	1,859	9,204	5.0	74	65	196	2,203	11.2	76	11	61	27	44.3	4	100	78	12	195	16.3	55	2

== After football ==
In 1974, Gilchrist founded the United Athletes Coalition of America to help former football players adjust to life after retirement. In 1975, he booked Marvin Gaye, Ike & Tina Turner, and Taveres for a benefit concert at Maple Leaf Gardens in Toronto.

Gilchrist had numerous feuds with the people he worked with during his football career. It has been stated that he refused entry into the Canadian Football Hall of Fame because he did not believe he was paid well enough for his service, while other sources contend that Gilchrist rejected the honor due to how he was treated in the past. However, Gilchrist stated that he did not turn down the Hall, stating the following in 2010:

"My throat cancer is in remission, my weight is the same. Tell Kaye Vaughan and the crew those days were the greatest in my life. I have great respect for every Canadian Football Player who played with and against me.

I loved Canada and the Canadian people. However Canada does not love Cookie Gilchrist. And I never turned down the Hall Of Fame. When John Agro told me to be nice to Jake Gaudaur, when he told me I was nominated to be inducted, I told Jake I would take that under advisement, and he or they made a lie out of it. Adolf Hitler said the truth when he said the bigger the lie, the more people believe it.

"What is my crime? I never robbed, raped, stolen, lied, cheated, sold drugs, beat my wife or children. So. Why did the country treat me as a persona non grata from 1956 to 2010? But it's okay, I know how to deal with all the players now. It will all come out in the production of my life story once all the T's are crossed and the I's dotted."

He also refused to accept enshrinement on the Buffalo Bills Wall of Fame because he wanted payment for appearing; Van Miller eventually convinced Gilchrist to change his mind, but Gilchrist was not inducted prior to his death. Gilchrist was posthumously inducted into the Greater Buffalo Sports Hall of Fame in 2011. Gilchrist did accept induction onto the Bills' Wall of Honor, the predecessor to the Wall of Fame that had been set up at War Memorial Stadium in 1970, but none of the honorees on that wall were carried over to Rich Stadium when it was built in 1973. On August 30, 2017, the Bills announced that he would be inducted into the Buffalo Bills Wall of Fame.

In an article in The Buffalo News on March 18, 2007, Gilchrist, then 71, announced that he was being treated for throat cancer. At the time, he lived in Natrona Heights, Pennsylvania.

On January 10, 2011, Gilchrist died at an assisted living facility in Pittsburgh, Pennsylvania. Gilchrist was posthumously diagnosed with stage four chronic traumatic encephalopathy, which may explain, in part, some of his behavioural difficulties. Gilchrist was aware of the possibility that he had the disease when writing his autobiography, The Cookie That Did Not Crumble, along with Chris Garbarino. Consequently, he donated his brain to the Canadian Sports Concussion Project for use in their study of CTE. Gilchrist was one of at least 345 NFL players to be diagnosed after death with this disease, which is caused by repeated hits to the head.

== Honors ==
- First American Football League player to gain over 1,000 yards in a season (14 games, 1,096 yards in 1962).
- Previously held the American professional football record for most yards rushing in a game, 243 yards vs. the New York Jets, on December 8, 1963.
- His number 34 has been officially retired by the Buffalo Bills, to honor both him and Thurman Thomas, who also wore the number.
- One of three players to lead the league in rushing touchdowns in four or more seasons
- First and so far only player to lead the league in rushing touchdowns for four consecutive seasons
- Honored by the Professional Football Researchers Association's "Hall of Very Good", a collection of outstanding professional football players not in the Pro Football Hall of Fame, as part of its 2013 class.
- Buffalo Bills Wall of Fame.

== See also ==
- List of American Football League players
