= Hub Barker =

American football player (1918–1994)

No. 42
- Positions: Quarterback, fullback, halfback, blocking back, safety, linebacker

Personal information
- Born: November 12, 1918; Welch, Oklahoma, U.S.
- Died: April 6, 1994 (aged 75)

Career information
- College: University of Arkansas

Career history
- 1942–1945: New York Giants

Hubert Lyle Barker (November 11, 1918 – April 6, 1994) was an American football player.

Barker was born in 1918 in Welch, Oklahoma, and attended Welch High School. He then enrolled at the University of Arkansas and played college football for the Arkansas Razorbacks football teams from 1938 to 1941.

Barker played professional football as a fullback and halfback for the Holyoke Golden Bears and Paterson Panthers during the 1942 season. He also played in the National Football League (NFL) as a blocking back, quarterback, safety, and linebacker for the New York Giants during the 1943, 1944, and 1945 seasons. He appeared in 16 games for the Giants. He was the Giants' starting quarterback early in the 1944 season.

After his football career, Barker worked for Arco Gas and Oil. He died in 1994 at age 75 in Tulsa, Oklahoma.
