= Emery Nix =

American football player (1919–2005)

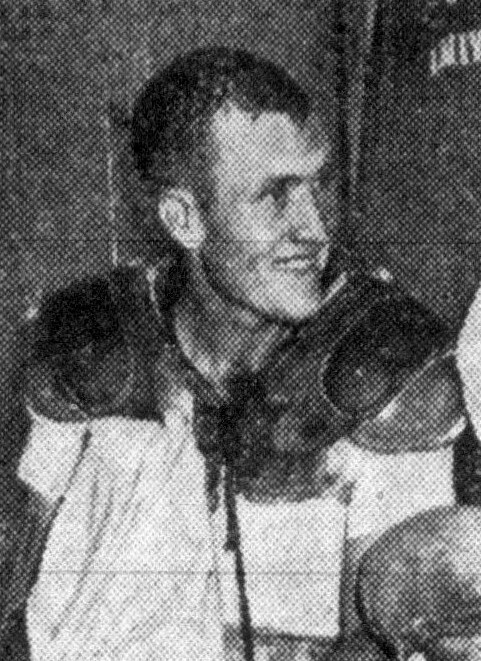
- Nix, circa 1942

No. 44, 41
- Position: Quarterback

Personal information
- Born: December 1, 1919; Chillicothe, Texas, U.S.
- Died: December 6, 2005 (aged 86); Blanco, Texas, U.S.

Career information
- College: TCU

Career history
- New York Giants (1943, 1946)

Career statistics
- TD–INT: 5-3
- Yards: 552
- QB rating: 79.2

Kenneth Emery Nix (December 1, 1919 – December 6, 2005) was an American football quarterback. He played two seasons in the National Football League (NFL) for the New York Giants in 1943 and 1946. He played college football for the TCU Horned Frogs and served in the United States Marine Corps during World War II.

== Early life ==
Nix was born in 1919 in Corpus Christi, Texas. He attended W. B. Ray High School in Corpus Christi. In 1938, he won all-state honors and led the football team to a state championship.

== College career ==
Nix enrolled at Texas Christian University (TCU), playing quarterback in 1941 and 1942. In 1941, he threw a touchdown pass with eight seconds remaining in the game to lead TCU to an upset over No. 2 Texas Longhorns and a berth in the Orange Bowl. He completed 31 of 84 passes for 620 yards in 1941. In 1942, he led the Horned Frogs to a 7–3 record (including a victory over the PCC champion UCLA Bruins and a second consecutive victory over the Texas Longhorns) and completed 66 of 154 passes for 674 yards. While playing for TCU, Nix was known as "Ice Water" due to his ability to remain cool under pressure.

== Professional career ==
In 1943, Nix played in the NFL for the New York Giants. He appeared in 10 games for the Giants in 1943, ranking among the NFL leaders with 396 passing yards (eighth) and 24 passes completed (10th).

Nix missed the 1944 and 1945 season while serving in the United States Marine Corps during World War II. He returned to the Giants in 1946, but appeared in only four games as a backup, completing 10 of 19 passes for 156 yars.

== Later life ==
Nix and his wife, Juanita, had three sons, Roger, Dean, and Kent Nix. Kent played quarterback in the NFL from 1967 to 1972. They were the first father-son quarterback combination in NFL history.

Nix died in December 2005 at age 86 at his home in Blanco, Texas.
