= Bill Paschal =

American football player (1921–2003)

No. 8, 38
- Positions: Fullback; Halfback

Personal information
- Born: May 28, 1921; Atlanta, Georgia, U.S.
- Died: May 25, 2003 (aged 81); Marietta, Georgia, U.S.
- Listed height: 6 ft 0 in (1.83 m)
- Listed weight: 201 lb (91 kg)

Career information
- High school: Tech (Atlanta)
- College: Georgia Tech
- NFL draft: 1943: undrafted

Career history
- New York Giants (1943–1947); Boston Yanks (1947–1948)

Awards and highlights
- First-team All-Pro (1944); Second-team All-Pro (1943); 2x NFL rushing touchdowns leader (1943, 1944); 2× NFL rushing yards leader (1943, 1944)

Career NFL statistics
- Rushing yards: 2,430
- Rushing average: 3.6
- Receptions: 32
- Receiving yards: 326
- Total touchdowns: 36
- Stats at Pro Football Reference

William Avner Paschal Jr. (May 28, 1921 – May 25, 2003) was an American professional football fullback in the National Football League for the New York Giants and the Boston Yanks.

== Early life ==
Paschal was born in Atlanta, Georgia and attended Tech High School, where he played football and track. He then played briefly at Georgia Tech before injuring his knee. After the injury, he left school and went to work as a railroad switchman in Georgia.

== Professional career ==
After his knee healed, Paschal got a tryout with the New York Giants on the recommendation of the sportswriter Grantland Rice and eventually signed with New York in 1943 for $1,500. He became the first player to win consecutive rushing championships in the NFL, gaining 572 yards on 147 carries in his rookie year and 737 yards on 196 rushes in his second year. He also led the league in rushing touchdowns both years, with ten in 1943 and nine in 1944.

Paschal was then traded to the Boston Yanks during the 1947 season and played through 1948, before retiring. He gained 2,430 yards with 28 rushing touchdowns for his career.

== NFL career statistics ==
Legend
	Led the league
**Bold**	Career high

=== Regular season ===
Year	Team	Games		Rushing					Receiving				
Year	Team	GP	GS	Att	Yds	Avg	Lng	TD	Rec	Yds	Avg	Lng	TD
1943	NYG	9	3	147	572	3.9	54	**10**	**9**	74	8.2	24	2
1944	NYG	10	6	**196**	**737**	3.8	68	9	0	0	0.0	0	0
1945	NYG	4	1	59	247	**4.2**	**77**	2	2	11	5.5	6	0
1946	NYG	10	1	117	362	3.1	30	4	**9**	78	8.7	**35**	2
1947	NYG	4	0	41	139	3.4	23	1	1	3	3.0	3	0
1947	BOS	8	4	37	124	3.4	-	1	3	67	**22.3**	30	0
1948	BOS	12	6	80	249	3.1	20	1	8	**93**	11.6	22	**4**
		57	21	677	2,430	3.6	77	28	32	326	10.2	35	8

=== Playoffs ===
Year	Team	Games		Rushing					Receiving				
Year	Team	GP	GS	Att	Yds	Avg	Lng	TD	Rec	Yds	Avg	Lng	TD
1943	NYG	1	0	**16**	**56**	**3.5**	**16**	0	0	0	0.0	0	0
1944	NYG	1	0	2	3	1.5	3	0	0	0	0.0	0	0
		2	0	18	59	3.3	16	0	0	0	0.0	0	0

== Personal life ==
Paschal and his wife, Carolyn had four daughters and a son.

== See also ==
- History of the New York Giants (1925–1978)
