= Carl Kinscherf =

American football player (1919–2006)

Carl Raymond Kinscherf (1919–2006) was an American professional football player from New Jersey.

== Early life and education ==
Kinscherf was born in Brooklyn, New York, on October 20, 1919, to Richard Kinscherf and Ann Kinscherf, and he grew up in Morristown, New Jersey. In 1938, Kinscherf graduated from the Morristown School (now Morristown-Beard School). Morristown-Beard School elected him to their Athletic Hall of Fame in 1986.

After graduating from high school, Kinscherf attended Colgate University in Hamilton, New York. Competing alongside Andy Rooney, Kinscherf played on the Colgate Raiders football team during the 1940 and 1941 seasons. He wore number 15. Beginning his professional career, Kinscherf played for the Patterson Panthers, a team in the American Association, during the 1942 season.

== Professional football ==
Kinscherf played fullback, defensive back, and punter for the New York Giants in the National Football League (NFL) during the 1943 and 1944 seasons. He tied the NFL record for most punts in a game (14) while competing against the Detroit Lions on November 7, 1943. (While competing for the Oakland Raiders, Leo Araguz set the current record of 16 punts in a game played against the San Diego Chargers on October 11, 1998.) Playing in the 1944 NFL Championship Game at the Polo Grounds, Kinscherf substituted at fullback.

== Military service ==
Following his time in the NFL, Kinscherf enlisted with the 14th British Army, and he drove an ambulance for the American Field Service in Burma (now Myanmar).

== Artistic career ==
Returning from Asia, Kinscherf began working as an architectural artist. He designed several buildings in New Jersey, and he created illustrations that accompanied magazine articles. Among other periodicals, Kinscherf created illustrations that ran in Popular Science and Popular Mechanics. His piece titled "Foundation" won an award from the American Watercolor Society.
