= Cookie Monster (computer program) =

Computer prank or malware

Cookie Monster was a program created in 1969 for several computer operating systems. The program was named after a character from The Andy Williams Show, but later became associated with the Muppet Cookie Monster. It started out as a way for computer users at Brown University to annoy their fellow students by manually sending messages blocking computer processes and demanding cookies until the user of the ransomed computer typed “cookie”. Though it is often called a virus, it does not self-replicate and spread, and so is considered a proto-virus, or simply malware instead. It is unrelated to the HTTP cookie.

When C.D. Tavares heard the idea at MIT, he decided to automate it. Since then, the program has been shared on different operating systems.

The automated program ran on PDP series minicomputers and was later replicated for Atari in two strains, called Cookie Monster Virus A and B. The only difference is that Virus B can survive a system reset if the system is not completely powered down. The Atari version has the same function as the original program, but this time pops up automatically in regular intervals, and sometimes appears ever more frequent as the program is "fed" more cookies. In order to remove the program completely, the user must type in "Oreo". In one version of the program, the demand for cookies would flash on the screen ever more rapidly until it would suddenly stop and print “I didn’t want a cookie anyway,” and then desist.

The program inspired the movie Hackers to include a fictitious "Cookie Monster Virus" that "ate" the system data of a Gibson supercomputer. It was stopped (presumably only temporarily) when the system administrator typed "cookie".
