= Cookies (American band) =

Cookies is a band from Brooklyn, New York, specializing in popular music. The band was formed by Ben Sterling, formerly of Mobius Band. Their music has been described as "pop music that is built to last" by The New Yorker and "hip-hop-infused electro-pop" by Interview Magazine.

== Discography ==
Albums

- "Music For Touching"

Singles

- Summer Jam 10"
- Boycrazy 10"
- Wilderness Tips
- Crybaby
