= List of NFL career all-purpose yards leaders =

This is a list of National Football League players with a career total of over 15,000 all-purpose yards. (Note: All-purpose yards are those gained by an offensive player from scrimmage, viz., those gained by a player's rushing or receiving a pass; a defensive player by return of interception or fumble; or by any player by return of punt, kickoff, or recovered fumble.)

Players listed in bold are currently active.

== List ==
Rank (Note: Rank is as of Week 6 of the 2026 season.)	Player	Position(s) regularly played	Seasons by team	Total all-purpose yards gained (Note: Total is through Week 6 of the 2026 season.)	Total rushing yards gained	Total receiving yards gained	Total interception return yards gained	Total punt return yards gained	Total kickoff return yards gained	Total recovered fumble return yards gained	Year of induction into Pro Football Hall of Fame
1	Jerry Rice	Wide receiver	San Francisco 49ers (1985–2000); Oakland Raiders (2001–2004); Seattle Seahawks (2004)	23,546	645	22,895	0	0	6	0	2010
2	Brian Mitchell	Running back Punt returner Kick returner	Washington Redskins (1990–1999); Philadelphia Eagles (2000–2002); New York Giants (2003)	23,330	1,967	2,336	0	4,999	14,014	14	None
3	Walter Payton	Running back	Chicago Bears (1975–1987)	21,803	16,726	4,538	0	0	539	0	1993
4	Emmitt Smith	Running back	Dallas Cowboys (1990–2002); Arizona Cardinals (2003–2004)	21,564	18,355	3,224	0	0	0	(15) (Note: Parentheses denote the negativity of the enclosed net yardage total.)	2010
5	Frank Gore	Running back	San Francisco 49ers (2005–2014); Indianapolis Colts (2015–2017); Miami Dolphins (2018); Buffalo Bills (2019); New York Jets (2020)	19,992	16,000	3,985	0	0	0	7	None
6	Darren Sproles	Running back Punt returner Kick returner	San Diego Chargers (2005–2010); New Orleans Saints (2011–2013); Philadelphia Eagles (2014–2019)	19,696	3,552	4,840	0	2,961	8,352	(9)	None
7	Tim Brown	Wide receiver Punt returner Kick returner	L.A./Oakland Raiders (1988–2003); Tampa Bay Buccaneers (2004)	19,682	190	14,934	0	3,320	1,235	3	2015
8	Marshall Faulk	Running back	Indianapolis Colts (1994–1998); St. Louis Rams (1999–2005)	19,190	12,279	6,875	0	0	18	18	2011
9	Steve Smith Sr.	Wide receiver Punt returner Kick returner	Carolina Panthers (2001–2013); Baltimore Ravens (2014–2016)	19,180	387	14,731	0	1,684	2,371	7	None
10	LaDainian Tomlinson	Running back	San Diego Chargers (2001–2009); New York Jets (2010–2011)	18,456	13,684	4,772	0	0	0	0	2017
11	Barry Sanders	Running back	Detroit Lions (1989–1998)	18,308	15,269	2,921	0	0	118	0	2004
12	Herschel Walker	Running back Kick returner	Dallas Cowboys (1986–1989, 1996–1997); Minnesota Vikings (1989–1991); Philadelphia Eagles (1992–1994); New York Giants (1995)	18,168	8,225	4,859	0	0	5,084	0	None
13	Adrian Peterson	Running back	Minnesota Vikings (2007–2016); New Orleans Saints (2017); Arizona Cardinals (2017); Washington Redskins (2018–2019); Detroit Lions (2020); Tennessee Titans (2021); Seattle Seahawks (2021)	17,808	14,918	2,474	0	0	428	(12)	Eligible in 2027 (Note: A player is not eligible for induction into the Pro Football Hall of Fame until he has been fully retired for five calendar years or is deceased.)
14	Marcus Allen	Running back	Los Angeles Raiders (1982–1992); Kansas City Chiefs (1993–1997)	17,648	12,243	5,411	0	0	0	(6)	2003
15	Larry Fitzgerald	Wide receiver	Arizona Cardinals (2004–2020)	17,560	68	17,492	0	0	0	0	2026
16	Curtis Martin	Running back	New England Patriots (1995–1997); New York Jets (1998–2005)	17,421	14,101	3,329	0	0	0	(9)	2012
17	Tiki Barber	Running back	New York Giants (1997–2006)	17,359	10,449	5,183	0	1,181	544	2	None
18	Eric Metcalf	Running back Wide receiver Punt returner Kick returner	Cleveland Browns (1989–1994); Atlanta Falcons (1995–1996); San Diego Chargers (1997); Arizona Cardinals (1998); Carolina Panthers (1999); Washington Redskins (2001); Green Bay Packers (2002)	17,230	2,392	5,572	0	3,453	5,813	0	None
19	Derrick Mason	Wide receiver Punt returner Kick returner	Tennessee Oilers/Titans (1997–2004); Baltimore Ravens (2005–2010); New York Jets (2011); Houston Texans (2011)	17,150	3	12,061	0	1,590	3,496	0	None
20	Wes Welker	Wide receiver Punt returner Kick returner	San Diego Chargers (2004); Miami Dolphins (2004–2006); New England Patriots (2007–2012); Denver Broncos (2013–2014); St. Louis Rams (2015)	16,797	151	9,924	0	2,584	4,138	0	None
21	Thurman Thomas	Running back	Buffalo Bills (1988–1999); Miami Dolphins (2000)	16,532	12,074	4,458	0	0	0	0	2007
22	Tony Dorsett	Running back	Dallas Cowboys (1977–1987); Denver Broncos (1988)	16,326	12,739	3,554	0	0	0	33	1994
23	Terrell Owens	Wide receiver	San Francisco 49ers (1996–2003); Philadelphia Eagles (2004–2005); Dallas Cowboys (2006–2008); Buffalo Bills (2009); Cincinnati Bengals (2010)	16,276	251	15,934	0	0	78	13	2018
24	Ted Ginn Jr.	Wide receiver Punt returner Kick returner	Miami Dolphins (2007–2009); San Francisco 49ers (2010–2012); Carolina Panthers (2013, 2015–2016); Arizona Cardinals (2014); New Orleans Saints (2017–2019); Chicago Bears (2020)	15,749	486	5,742	0	2,624	6,899	(2)	None
25	Henry Ellard	Wide receiver	Los Angeles Rams (1983–1993); Washington Redskins (1994–1998); New England Patriots (1998)	15,718	50	13,777	0	1,527	364	0	None
26	Warrick Dunn	Running back	Tampa Bay Buccaneers (1997–2001, 2008); Atlanta Falcons (2002–2007)	15,665	10,967	4,339	0	48	310	1	None
27	Randy Moss	Wide receiver	Minnesota Vikings (1998–2004, 2010); Oakland Raiders (2005–2006); New England Patriots (2007–2010); Tennessee Titans (2010); San Francisco 49ers (2012)	15,644	159	15,292	0	162	33	(2)	2018
28	Edgerrin James	Running back	Indianapolis Colts (1999–2005); Arizona Cardinals (2006–2008); Seattle Seahawks (2009)	15,610	12,246	3,364	0	0	0	0	2020
29	Derrick Henry	Running back	Tennessee Titans (2016–2023); Baltimore Ravens (2024–present)	15,597	13,717	1,886	0	0	0	0	Active
30	Irving Fryar	Wide receiver Punt returner	New England Patriots (1984–1992); Miami Dolphins (1993–1995); Philadelphia Eagles (1996–1998); Washington Redskins (1999–2000)	15,594	242	12,785	0	2,055	505	7	None
31	Jim Brown	Running back	Cleveland Browns (1957–1965)	15,459	12,312	2,499	0	0	648	0	1971
32	Josh Cribbs	Wide receiver Punt returner Kick returner	Cleveland Browns (2005–2012); Oakland Raiders (2013); New York Jets (2013); Indianapolis Colts (2014)	15,453	808	1,175	0	2,375	11,113	(18)	None
33	Eric Dickerson	Running back	Los Angeles Rams (1983–1987); Indianapolis Colts (1987–1991); Los Angeles Raiders (1992); Atlanta Falcons (1993)	15,411	13,259	2,137	0	0	0	15	1999
34	Isaac Bruce	Wide receiver	L.A./St. Louis Rams (1994–2007); San Francisco 49ers (2008–2009)	15,399	139	15,208	0	52	0	0	2020
35	Antonio Brown	Wide receiver Punt returner Kick returner	Pittsburgh Steelers (2010–2018); New England Patriots (2019); Tampa Bay Buccaneers (2020–2021)	15,353	128	12,291	0	1,761	1,173	0	Eligible in 2027
36	Steven Jackson	Running back	St. Louis Rams (2004–2012); Atlanta Falcons (2013–2014); New England Patriots (2015)	15,191	11,438	3,683	0	0	79	(9)	None
37	Tony Gonzalez	Tight end	Kansas City Chiefs (1997–2008); Atlanta Falcons (2009–2013)	15,141	14	15,127	0	0	0	0	2019
38	Jerome Bettis	Running back	L.A./St. Louis Rams (1993–1995); Pittsburgh Steelers (1996–2005)	15,113	13,662	1,449	0	0	0	2	2015
39	Allen Rossum	Cornerback; Punt returner Kick returner	Philadelphia Eagles (1998–1999); Green Bay Packers (2000–2001); Atlanta Falcons (2002–2006); Pittsburgh Steelers (2007); San Francisco 49ers (2008–2009); Dallas Cowboys (2009)	15,046	17	4	22	3,056	11,947	0	None
40	LeSean McCoy	Running back	Philadelphia Eagles (2009–2014); Buffalo Bills (2015–2018); Kansas City Chiefs (2019); Tampa Bay Buccaneers (2020)	15,001	11,102	3,898	0	0	0	1	None

== See also ==
- List of NFL individual records
- List of NFL career rushing yards leaders
- List of NFL career receiving yards leaders
