= List of NFL career rushing attempts leaders =

This is a list of National Football League running backs by total career rushing attempts. This list includes all running backs with at least 2,500 attempts.

Active players listed in bold type.

== Players with at least 2,500 rushing attempts ==
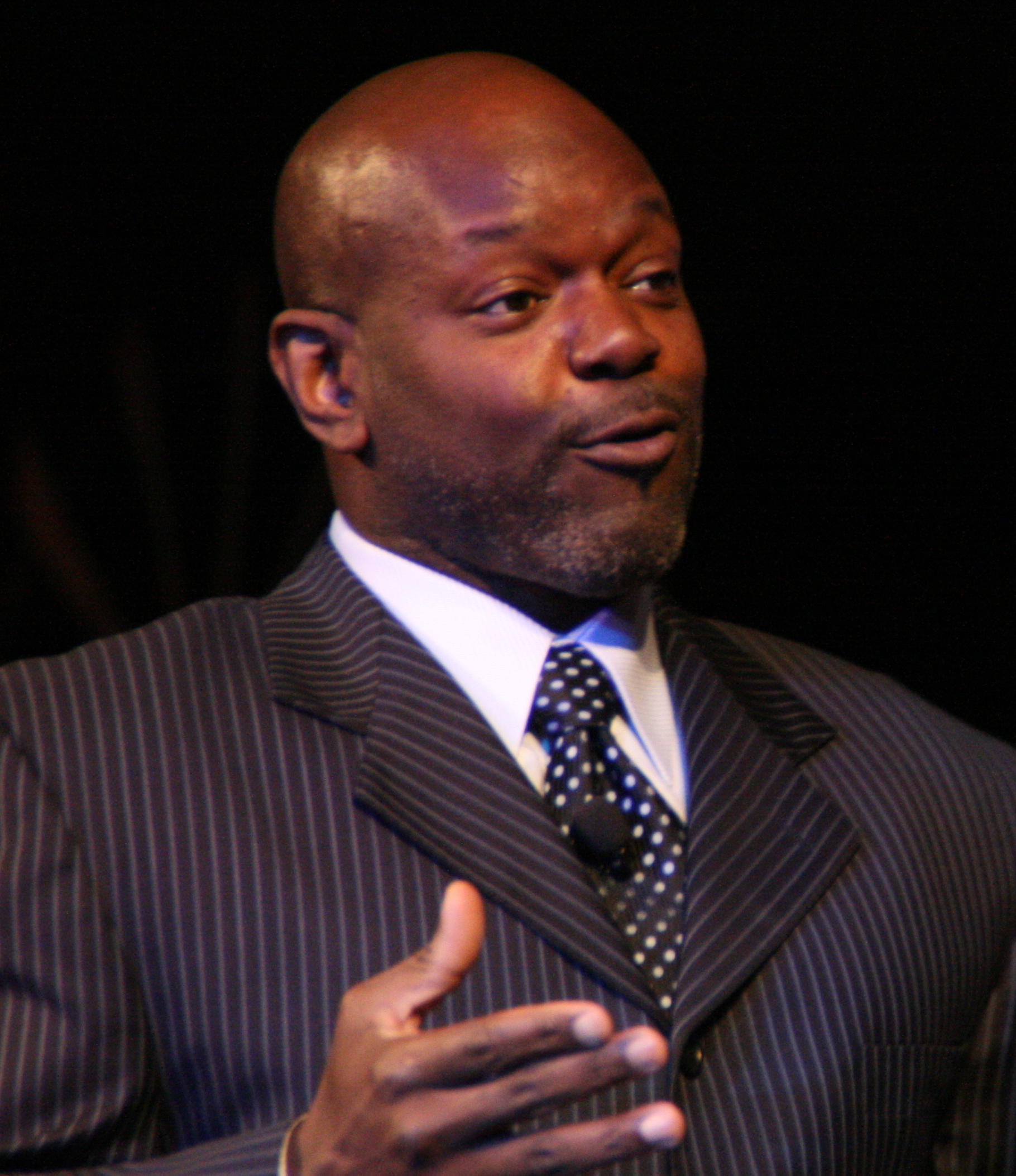
Emmitt Smith has the most rushing attempts with 4,409.

Rank	Player	Attempts
1	Emmitt Smith	4,409
2	Walter Payton	3,838
3	Frank Gore	3,735
4	Curtis Martin	3,518
5	Jerome Bettis	3,479
6	Adrian Peterson	3,210
7	LaDainian Tomlinson	3,174
8	Barry Sanders	3,062
9	Edgerrin James	3,028
10	Marcus Allen	3,022
11	Eric Dickerson	2,996
12	Franco Harris	2,949
13	Tony Dorsett	2,936
14	John Riggins	2,916
15	Thurman Thomas	2,877
16	Eddie George	2,865
17	Derrick Henry	2,847
18	Marshall Faulk	2,836
19	Steven Jackson	2,764
20	Thomas Jones	2,678
21	Warrick Dunn	2,669
22	Ricky Watters	2,622
23	Corey Dillon	2,618
24	Ottis Anderson	2,562
25	Jamal Lewis	2,542
26	Fred Taylor	2,534

== Active player with at least 2,000 attempts ==
Through 2026 season; numbers in attempts.

== Players with at least 200 postseason rushing attempts ==
Rank	Player	Attempts
1	Franco Harris	400
2	Emmitt Smith	349
3	Thurman Thomas	339
4	Tony Dorsett	302
5	Marcus Allen	267
6	John Riggins	251
7	Chuck Foreman	229
8	Larry Csonka	225
9	Edgerrin James	218
10	Marshawn Lynch	211
11	Roger Craig	208
12	Eddie George	206
13	Terrell Davis	204

== See also ==
- List of NFL rushing champions
- List of NFL career rushing yards leaders
- List of NFL career rushing touchdowns leaders
