= Frank Gore =

American football player (born 1983)

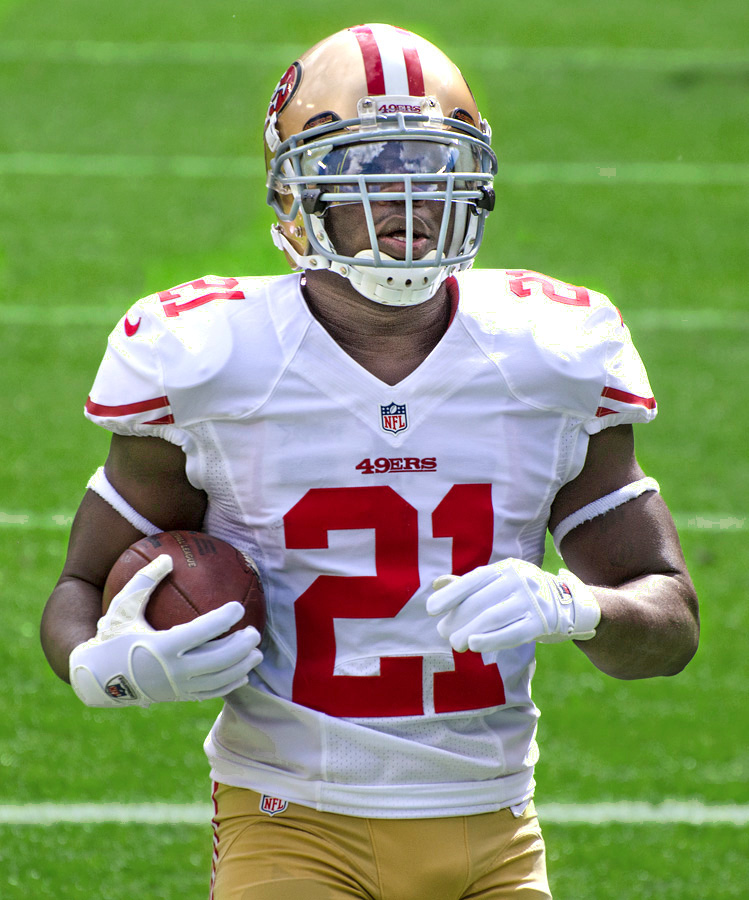
- Gore with the San Francisco 49ers in 2012

San Francisco 49ers
- Title: Football personnel advisor

Personal information
- Born: May 14, 1983 (age 43); Miami, Florida, U.S.
- Listed height: 5 ft 9 in (1.75 m)
- Listed weight: 212 lb (96 kg)

Career information
- Position: Running back (No. 21, 23, 20)
- High school: Coral Gables Senior (Coral Gables, Florida)
- College: Miami (FL) (2001–2004)
- NFL draft: 2005: 3rd round, 65th overall pick

Career history

Playing
- San Francisco 49ers (2005–2014); Indianapolis Colts (2015–2017); Miami Dolphins (2018); Buffalo Bills (2019); New York Jets (2020)

Operations
- San Francisco 49ers (2023–present) Football advisor

Awards and highlights
- Second-team All-Pro (2006); 5× Pro Bowl (2006, 2009, 2011–2013); NFL 2010s All-Decade Team; San Francisco 49ers Hall of Fame; BCS national champion (2001); ACC Brian Piccolo Award (2004); Second-team All-ACC (2004); NFL record: Most games played by a running back: 241

Career NFL statistics
- Rushing attempts: 3,735
- Rushing yards: 16,000
- Rushing touchdowns: 81
- Receptions: 484
- Receiving yards: 3,985
- Receiving touchdowns: 18
- Stats at Pro Football Reference

Franklin Gore Sr. (born May 14, 1983) is an American former professional football running back who played in the National Football League (NFL) for 16 seasons. A member of the San Francisco 49ers for most of his career, he ranks third in NFL career rushing yards. His career was also noted for longevity, a rare trait with his position, and he holds the league record for games played by a running back.

Gore played college football for the Miami Hurricanes and was selected by the 49ers in the third round of the 2005 NFL draft. During his 10 seasons with the 49ers, he became the franchise's rushing yards leader, in addition to receiving five Pro Bowl selections and one second-team All-Pro selection. He also led the National Football Conference (NFC) in rushing yards during the 2006 season and made an appearance in Super Bowl XLVII in 2012. After leaving San Francisco at the end of the 2014 season, Gore played for the Indianapolis Colts, Miami Dolphins, Buffalo Bills, and New York Jets. Following his retirement, he has served as a football advisor to the 49ers since 2023. He was named to the NFL 2010s All-Decade Team in 2020.

== Early life ==
Gore was born on May 14, 1983, in Miami, Florida, and grew up in Coconut Grove. He attended Coral Gables Senior High School in Coral Gables, Florida, where he played running back on the football team. He had two notable record-breaking games. Against Miami Northwestern High School, he had a then-career high 293 yards and two touchdowns on 10 carries. In the next game, he broke that record with 319 yards and six touchdowns on 13 carries against the third-ranked defense in the nation. During his senior year in 2000, Gore broke several Dade County single-season records, including rushing yards (2,997) and touchdowns (39). Heavily recruited, he was named the fourth-ranked prospect in the state of Florida and 18th nationally.

While emerging as a talented football prospect, Gore also focused his attention on improving his academics and assisting his mother, who was battling kidney disease and had started dialysis treatments. To remain close to home, Gore chose to attend the University of Miami.

== College career ==
Gore had a scholarship to attend the University of Miami under head coach Larry Coker.

=== 2001 season ===
In his freshman year, Gore shared the backfield with Clinton Portis and Willis McGahee, with Portis receiving a majority of the carries. Gore made his collegiate debut against the Penn State Nittany Lions on September 1. He had six carries for 15 yards in the 33–7 victory over the Nittany Lions. In the next game against the Rutgers Scarlet Knights, he had six carries for 78 yards and his first collegiate rushing touchdown in the 61–0 victory. On October 25, Gore had a breakout game against the West Virginia Mountaineers with six carries for 124 yards and two touchdowns in the 45–3 victory. On November 17, he churned 11 carries for 157 rushing yards against Syracuse.

As a true freshman for the Miami Hurricanes football in 2001, Gore totaled 562 yards with five touchdowns on 62 carries, for a 9.1-yard avg, as a backup to Clinton Portis on Miami's 2001 National championship winning team. Gore has the third-best season total in school history by a freshman and was named Sporting News' Big East Freshman of the Year.

=== 2002 season ===
Gore suffered a torn anterior cruciate ligament (ACL) in his left knee during spring practice in 2002 and spent the following season recovering from knee surgery. Before his injury that year, Gore beat out future NFL running back Willis McGahee in the spring of 2002 for the role as the Hurricanes' starter.

=== 2003 season ===
Gore returned from his injury in the 2003 season. He shared the backfield with Jarrett Payton and Tyrone Moss. Gore started the season strong with three games going over 100 rushing yards and scoring three touchdowns in that span. However, on October 2, Gore played in his final game of the 2003 season against the West Virginia Mountaineers and had four carries for 15 yards before tearing his ACL again, which ended his season.

Gore finished the 2003 season with 89 carries for 468 rushing yards and four rushing touchdowns to go along with 12 receptions for 105 receiving yards.

=== 2004 season ===
Gore returned from his ACL injury to lead the Miami backfield in carries, rushing yards, and rushing touchdowns. In the regular season opener against Florida State, he recorded the game-winning 18-yard touchdown run in overtime. He recorded three games with over 100 rushing yards, including a 195-yard performance against Virginia on October 13. He finished the season with 197 carries for 945 rushing yards and eight rushing touchdowns.

In 28 total games with the Hurricanes, Gore rushed 348 times for 1,975 yards (a 5.7 rushing average) and seventeen touchdowns. When his college career was finished, Gore's 1,975 yards ranked seventh on the school's career-record list and his seventeen touchdowns were tied for tenth. He also caught 25 passes for 225 yards (9.8 avg), returned two kickoffs for 48 yards and recorded five tackles on special teams. Gore was inducted into the University of Miami Sports Hall of Fame in 2018.

== Professional career ==
Pre-draft measurables
Height	Weight	40-yard dash	20-yard shuttle	Three-cone drill	Vertical jump	Broad jump	Bench press	Wonderlic
5 ft 9 3/8 in (1.76 m)	210 lb (95 kg)	4.58 s	4.11 s	6.91 s	34 in (0.86 m)	9 ft 1 in (2.77 m)	17 reps	6
All values from NFL Combine

=== San Francisco 49ers ===
==== 2005 season ====
Gore was selected in the third round with the 65th overall pick of the 2005 NFL draft by the San Francisco 49ers. He was the sixth running back to be selected in the 2005 NFL Draft. In addition, he was the third of five Miami Hurricanes to be selected that year.

Gore signed a three-year contract with the team on July 28, 2005. He played in 14 games, starting one, in the 2005 season. Gore was inactive for two contests with a groin injury. He finished the season seventh among all NFL rookie running backs in rushing average with 4.8 average per run. He led the team in rushing with 608 yards on 127 carries and three rushing touchdowns. Gore also caught 15 passes for 131 yards. His season was the first time a rookie led the 49ers in rushing since 1990, when Dexter Carter paced the team with 460 yards. Gore's 608 rushing yards was the highest for a 49ers rookie since Roger Craig had 725 yards rushing in 1983.

Gore rushed for 17 yards on four carries and caught two passes for 21 yards in his NFL debut, a 28–25 victory over the St. Louis Rams. Two weeks later, he rushed for 42 yards on seven carries with a 5.4-yard average in a 34–31 loss against the Dallas Cowboys. Gore led the team with 89 yards on nine carries and recorded a then career-long 72-yard touchdown run in the fourth quarter of a 52–17 road loss to the Washington Redskins. The touchdown was the longest run from scrimmage by a 49ers player since running back Kevan Barlow had a 78-yard rush against the Pittsburgh Steelers in 2003. The touchdown run was fifth-longest run from scrimmage by a 49ers rookie. Gore led the team in rushing for the third straight week with 55 yards on 14 carries (3.9-yard avg.) at the Chicago Bears, with a 19-yard long. He made his first NFL start in a 10–9 road loss to the Jacksonville Jaguars, amassing over 100 combined yards with 79 yards rushing on 19 attempts for a 4.2 yard average with three receptions for 57 yards. Gore had his first two-touchdown game in a 24–20 victory over the Rams, with a 10-yard scoring run in the second quarter and a 30-yard score in the fourth quarter. In the regular-season finale against the Houston Texans, he registered his first 100-yard game with 108 yards on 25 carries as the 49ers won by a score of 20–17. Following the season, he had major surgery on both shoulders.

==== 2006 season ====
Gore was elevated to the top of the 49ers' depth chart following the August 19, 2006, trade that shipped incumbent starter Kevan Barlow to the New York Jets in exchange for a fourth-round draft pick.

Gore emerged as one of the top running backs in the NFL in his first full season as the starter. He carried the ball 312 times for a franchise-record 1,695 yards, eclipsing Garrison Hearst's 1998 record of 1,570 yards. Gore became the first player in franchise history to lead the NFC in rushing yards. He also set a franchise record with 2,180 combined yards (1,695 yards rushing and 485 yards receiving), breaking Hearst's single-season record of 2,105 total yards (1,570 rushing and 535 receiving) set in 1998. Gore's total placed him second in the NFC to Steven Jackson (1,528 rushing and 806 receiving, 2,334 total) and fourth overall in the entire NFL. In the 49ers' first meeting against the Seattle Seahawks, Gore set the 49ers' single-game rushing record by totaling a career-high 212 yards on 24 carries, besting the 201 yards by Charlie Garner on September 24, 2000, against the Dallas Cowboys. Gore had nine 100-yard rushing games in 2006, giving him ten for his career. His nine 100-yard games in 2006 shattered the franchise record for most 100-yard games in a season. Garrison Hearst (1998) and Roger Craig (1988) each had six 100-yard games in a season. Gore was the first 49ers running back to have three-straight 100 yard games since Garrison Hearst had a 49ers-record four straight 100-yard games during Weeks 13–16 of the 1998 season. In those three weeks, Gore set the team record for most rushing yards in a three-game span.

Gore's breakaway ability helped him finish the season with 5.4 yards per carry, placing him third in the entire NFL, behind only Michael Vick (8.4 YPC on 123 carries) and Maurice Jones-Drew (5.7 YPC on 166 carries). The 5.4 yards per carry are tied for the second-best in 49ers history. Among players with over 300 carries, however, Gore's season puts him in elite company. Very few times has a player averaged as many yards per carry as Gore did while carrying the ball over 300 times. The players ahead of him contain Hall of Famers and feature five 2,000-yard rushing seasons.

Gore finished the season with eight rushing touchdowns, tied for the third-most in a season by a 49er. He finished the season with a team-leading 61 receptions. Only two other teams had a running back as their leading receiver: New Orleans (Reggie Bush) and Philadelphia (Brian Westbrook). Of those, only Gore and Westbrook also led their team in rushing. Gore also caught his first receiving touchdown of his career on the road against the Seahawks when quarterback Alex Smith avoided a sack and found Gore along the left sideline for a 20-yard score. Gore led the NFL with 16 rushes for 20 or more yards. Gore earned NFC Offensive Player of the Week honors twice during the 2006 season. He earned the honor in Week 5 after rushing for 134 yards on 27 carries and catching three passes for 38 yards against the Oakland Raiders. In addition, he won in Week 11 after his franchise-record 212 rushing yards, and 26 yards on four receptions, against the Seahawks. After Gore's tremendous season, he was named the starting running back to the NFC Pro Bowl team in his first Pro Bowl nomination.

At some point during his breakout season, Gore was given the nickname "The Inconvenient Truth", which stuck with him for the rest of his career. The nickname was inspired by the movie An Inconvenient Truth written by former United States Vice President Al Gore, which was released in May of the same year.

Gore had benefited that season from the tutelage of then-offensive coordinator Norv Turner, whose offensive scheme places a heavy emphasis on running the football.

Though Gore had fumbling problems at the beginning of the season, losing the ball once in each of the first four games, he improved his carrying and only fumbled three more times the rest of the year.

==== 2007 season ====
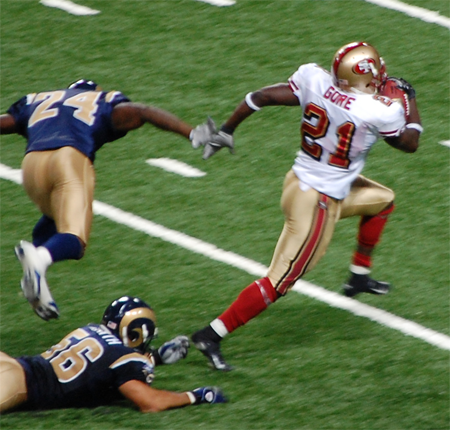
Gore in action against the St. Louis Rams in 2007

Gore signed a contract extension through 2011 estimated to be worth $28 million over four years on March 28, 2007. He also stated that it was his goal to surpass Eric Dickerson's single-season rushing record in 2007. He said that he would gain 2,200 yards.

Gore broke a bone in his hand in the non-contact training camp drill on July 30 and missed the entire preseason. He was able to return in time for the regular-season opener against the Arizona Cardinals on September 10. On September 13, Gore's mother died of a kidney disease. He missed a practice, but returned to the team and scored two touchdowns the following Sunday in a narrow 17–16 road victory over the St. Louis Rams. Gore's best game came against the Cardinals in their divisional rematch in Week 12, where he recorded 116 rushing yards and two touchdown to go along with 11 receptions for 98 yards. For his efforts, Gore earned NFC Offensive Player of the Week. Three weeks later against the Cincinnati Bengals, he had a season-high 138 rushing yards in the 20–13 victory.

Gore finished the season with 260 carries for 1,102 yards and five touchdowns to go along with 53 receptions for 436 yards and a touchdown as the 49ers finished with a 5–11 record.

==== 2008 season ====
Gore began the 2008 season against the Arizona Cardinals with 96 rushing yards on only 14 carries. Despite his impressive performance, which also included a 41-yard touchdown run, the 49ers lost by a score of 23–13.

During Week 3, Gore dominated the Detroit Lions, rushing for over 120 yards and a touchdown in a 31–13 victory. Three weeks later, Gore had his second 100-yard game of the season, as he rushed for 101 yards on 19 carries in a 40–26 loss against the Philadelphia Eagles. In the regular-season finale against the Washington Redskins, Gore became the first running back in 49ers history to rush for 1,000 yards or more in three straight seasons as the 49ers won by a score of 27–24.

Gore finished the season with 240 carries for 1,036 yards and six touchdowns to go along with 43 receptions for 373 yards and two touchdowns.

==== 2009 season ====
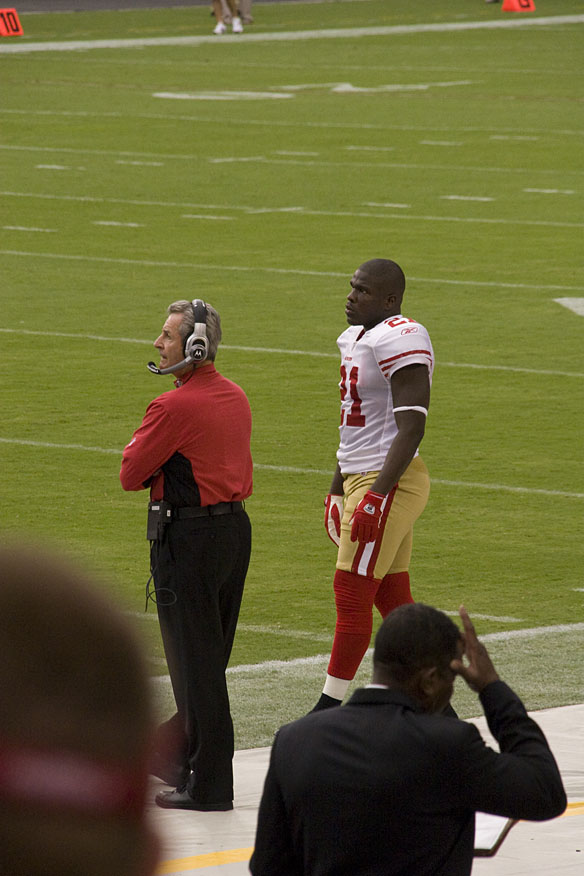
Gore waiting for the start of the 2009 season opener against the Arizona Cardinals

Gore entered the 2009 season under the guidance of new running back coach Tom Rathman. He was also complemented by a new second-string back, 49ers' third-round draft pick Glen Coffee.

After being nearly shut down in the season-opener against the Arizona Cardinals, Gore had a career day the following week in the home opener against the Seattle Seahawks. Gore rushed for 206 yards for a 12.8-yard average, including a 79-yard and an 80-yard touchdown run in the 23–10 victory, becoming the second player in NFL history to rush for two touchdowns for 75 yards or more in a single game, with the other being Hall-of-Fame running back Barry Sanders. He earned NFC Offensive Player of the Week for the fourth time in his career.

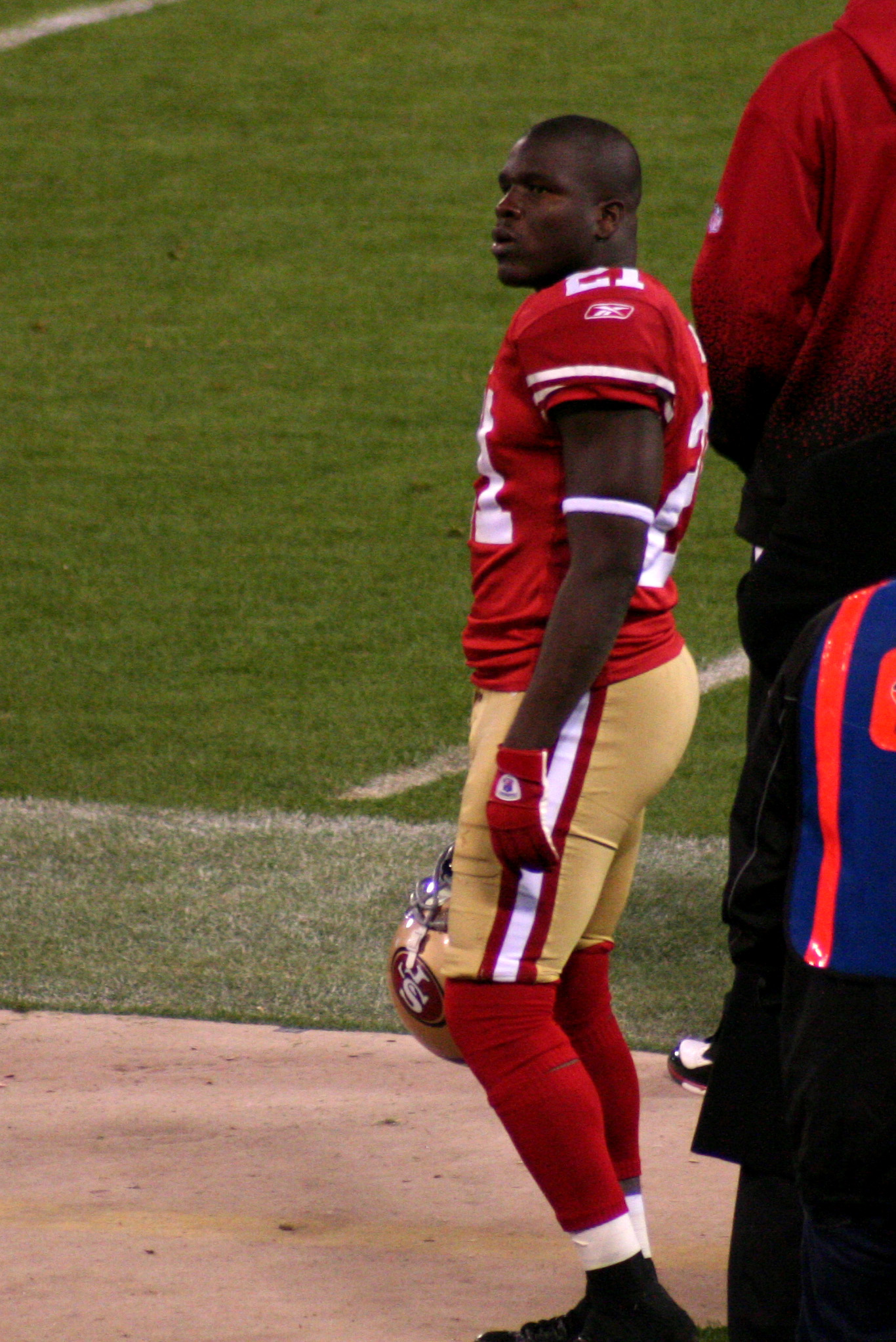
Gore on the sidelines with the San Francisco 49ers, 2009

After missing two games against the St. Louis Rams and Atlanta Falcons due to an ankle injury, Gore returned in Week 7 against the Houston Texans. While he had a successful game against the Chicago Bears in Week 10, gaining 104 yards with a touchdown, he was used less in the 49ers' offensive game plan in the following three weeks, after the team adopted more of a spread offense. In the 49ers' second divisional game against the Cardinals in Week 14, Gore had one of his most successful games of the season, rushing for 167 yards on 25 carries and a touchdown. He earned his second NFC Offensive Player of the Week award for the 2009 season. Against the Philadelphia Eagles in Week 16, Gore had 16 carries for 107 yards against an Eagles team that had not given up a 100-yard game in 22 consecutive games. Gore was named a first alternate for the 2009 Pro Bowl. On January 20, 2010, Steven Jackson announced he would not be playing in the Pro Bowl because of injury, so Gore was named to the 2010 Pro Bowl in his spot, the second of his career. For the season, Gore amassed 10 rushing touchdowns and 13 total touchdowns from scrimmage, both career bests.

==== 2010 season ====
After a slow start to the season with 17 carries for 38 yards against the Seattle Seahawks, Gore had 168 scrimmage yards (112 rushing, 56 receiving) against the New Orleans Saints in Week 2. During Week 3 against the Kansas City Chiefs, he had nine receptions for 102 yards, his only career game with over 100 receiving yards. Gore had rushed for four 100-yard games before fracturing his right hip in a Week 12 win over the Arizona Cardinals, prematurely ending his season after the 49ers put him on IR.

Gore finished the 2010 season with 203 carries for 853 yards and three touchdowns to go along with 46 receptions for 452 yards and two touchdowns. He was ranked 94th by his fellow players on the NFL Top 100 Players of 2011.

==== 2011 season ====
Gore agreed to a three-year extension, worth $25.9 million, on August 30, 2011. The extension kept Gore with the San Francisco 49ers through the 2014 season.

During the offseason, the 49ers hired Jim Harbaugh to be their new head coach and built themselves around a combination of a great running game, a supplemental passing game and a power house defense. This combination proved to be effective for Gore and the 49ers, leading them to a 13–3 record in the regular season and a playoff spot for the 49ers, their first such appearance since 2002 along with a first round bye.

In the first three games of the season, Gore did not perform well, rushing for 148 yards on 59 carries for only one touchdown. During Week 4 against the Philadelphia Eagles, the 49ers were down 23–3 at the end of the first half, but quarterback Alex Smith and Gore both led drives to narrowly win 24–23. Gore rushed for 127 yards on 15 carries and rushed for the game-winning touchdown when four minutes were left in the game. In the next game against the Tampa Bay Buccaneers, Gore rushed for 125 yards and a touchdown in the 48–3 win for the 49ers. However, his performance in that game was eclipsed by his performance the following week against the Detroit Lions, where he rushed a season-high of 141 yards on 15 carries and a touchdown in a 25–19 road victory, defeating the previously unbeaten Lions.

The next few games went pretty well for Gore, rushing for 134 yards and a touchdown against the Cleveland Browns and 107 yards against the Washington Redskins, becoming the 49ers' record holder of most consecutive games with 100 yards with five. However, against the New York Giants, Gore had an unmemorable performance, rushing for no yards and leaving in the second half with a knee injury. This was his first game with no rushing yards. Gore returned the next game, where he redeemed himself against the Arizona Cardinals, rushing for 88 yards and a touchdown. However, he rushed for only 39 yards in the next game against the Baltimore Ravens as the 49ers lost by a score of 6–16. The following week, however, proved to be a 49ers win against the St. Louis Rams, where Gore became the 49ers' all-time leading yardage rusher, surpassing Joe Perry's mark of 8,689 yards; he rushed for 73 yards on the game. The next week, Gore performed well, rushing for 72 yards and the 49ers' only touchdown in the narrow 21–19 loss.

Gore managed to finish the season on a high note, with a three-game winning streak, including one against the Pittsburgh Steelers, where he rushed for 65 yards and a touchdown. Gore finished the season with 1,211 yards, having had five seasons with at least 1,000 rushing yards.

During the playoffs, Gore performed exceedingly well, helping the 49ers set up a touchdown by rushing for 42 yards in the divisional round in his playoff debut, a 36–32 victory over the New Orleans Saints; Gore had a total of 89 yards in the game. During the NFC Championship Game, he rushed for 74 yards in the 20–17 overtime loss to the Giants. Gore was ranked 28th by his fellow players on the NFL Top 100 Players of 2012.

==== 2012 season ====
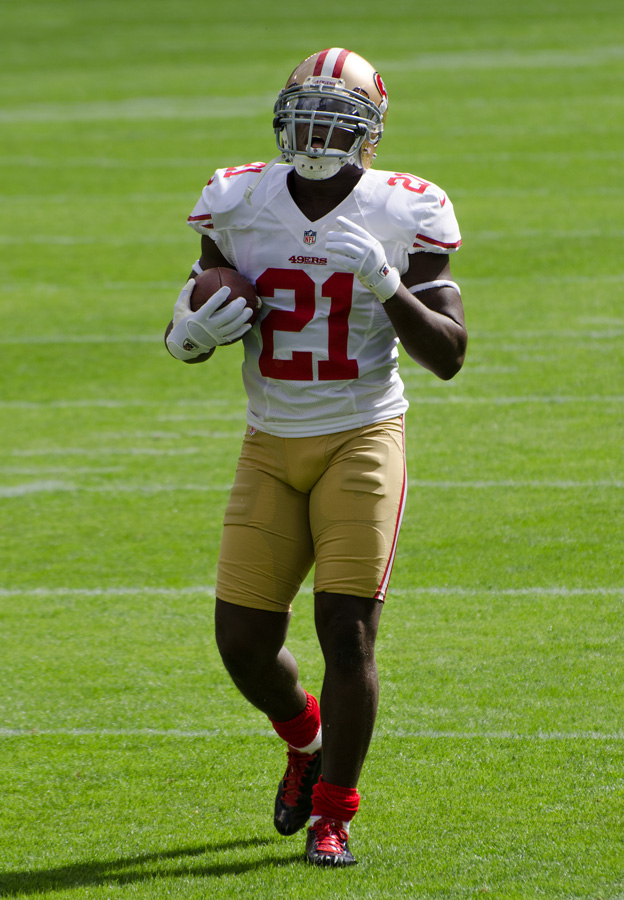
Gore in Green Bay for the 2012 season opener

In the 2012 regular season, Gore started all 16 games and had three games going over the 100-yard mark. In the regular-season finale against the Arizona Cardinals at Candlestick Park, Gore became the all-time franchise leader in rushing touchdowns (51) as the 49ers won the NFC West.

Gore finished the 2012 season with 258 carries for 1,214 yards and eight touchdowns to go along with 28 receptions for 234 yards and a touchdown. He was also selected to play in the Pro Bowl, his fourth appearance.

In the playoffs, the 49ers faced the Green Bay Packers once again, this time in the divisional round. Gore ran for 119 yards and a touchdown. In the next round, the San Francisco 49ers visited the Georgia Dome to play against the top-seeded Atlanta Falcons in the NFC Championship Game. The game ended up with the San Francisco 49ers winning 28–24 with Gore having 90 rushing yards and two touchdowns, allowing the 49ers to go to Super Bowl XLVII, their first Super Bowl appearance since 1994. In the Super Bowl, Gore had 19 carries for 110 yards and a touchdown, but the 49ers fell behind 28–6 early and could not complete the comeback, losing the game 34–31 to the Baltimore Ravens. Gore was ranked 32nd by his fellow players on the NFL Top 100 Players of 2013.

==== 2013 season ====
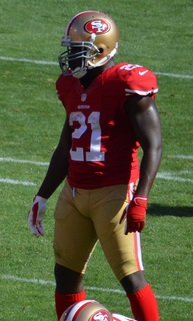
Gore in 2013

Gore entered the season with a lot of questions about his age, having turned 30 during the offseason. His season got off to a slow start as he rushed for a total of only 142 yards through the first three games. In Week 4, Gore had a big game rushing for 153 yards and a touchdown on 20 carries in a 35–11 road victory over the St. Louis Rams. Gore and the running game led the 49ers to five straight victories. In Week 14, he had a 51-yard rush with four minutes left that help secure a 19–17 victory over the Seattle Seahawks.

In 2013, Gore had three 100-yard games and finished with 279 carries for 1,128 yards and nine touchdowns to go along with 16 receptions for 141 yards.

Gore in 2013

In the wild-card round 23–20 victory over the Green Bay Packers, Gore rushed for 66 yards and a touchdown. In the 23–10 divisional round road victory over the Carolina Panthers, he had 84 rushing yards on 17 carries. In the 23–17 NFC Championship road loss to the Seahawks, Gore had 14 rushing yards on 11 carries to go along with a 17-yard reception. He was ranked 46th by his fellow players on the NFL Top 100 Players of 2014.

==== 2014 season ====
Gore became the 29th player to reach the 10,000 career rushing yard mark in the first game of the season, with 66 yards in the season-opening 28–17 road victory over the Dallas Cowboys. The 49ers went away from the running game until Week 4, when Gore rushed for 119 yards on 24 carries, and also had a career long 55-yard receiving touchdown in a 26–21 victory over the Philadelphia Eagles. In the next game, he rushed for 107 yards on 18 carries against the Kansas City Chiefs. The 8–8 49ers struggled all season to find an identity, and featured Gore's running game prominently after being eliminated from the playoffs. He rushed for 158 yards and a season-long 52-yard touchdown on 26 carries as the 49ers lost in overtime to the San Diego Chargers in Week 16 by a score of 35–38, and in his final game with the 49ers, he rushed for 144 yards on 25 carries as the 49ers beat the Arizona Cardinals by a score of 20–17.

Gore finished the 2014 season with 255 carries for 1,106 yards and four touchdowns to go along with 11 receptions for 111 yards and a touchdown. He also became the 20th player in NFL history to rush for 11,000 career rushing yards. moving up from 29th place on the all-time rushing yards leaderboard at the start of the season.

=== Indianapolis Colts ===
==== 2015 season ====
On March 10, 2015, Gore signed a three-year, $12 million contract with the Indianapolis Colts. His contract included $8.5 million in guarantees. Prior to signing with the Colts, it was widely reported that Gore had agreed to a deal with the Philadelphia Eagles on March 9 to replace LeSean McCoy. However, the following day several sources claimed that Gore had second thoughts about his agreement, and instead signed with Indianapolis.

Gore enjoyed a respectable season, but 2015 marked the first season in which he played all 16 games and did not record at least 1,000 rushing yards. Gore finished ninth in the league in rushing yards with 967 and had six touchdowns, while also adding 34 receptions for 267 yards and a touchdown. Gore found the endzone twice as part of an 86-rushing yard performance in a narrow Week 3 35–33 road victory over the Tennessee Titans. He had a productive game against the Miami Dolphins, where quarterback Matt Hasselbeck was injured in what was the final game of his career. Gore stepped up to engineer an 18–14 road victory with 85 rushing yards on 15 carries with two touchdowns. He moved up five more places to 15th all-time in rushing yards, and also passed Steven Jackson in early October to become the NFL's active leader in career rushing yards.

==== 2016 season ====
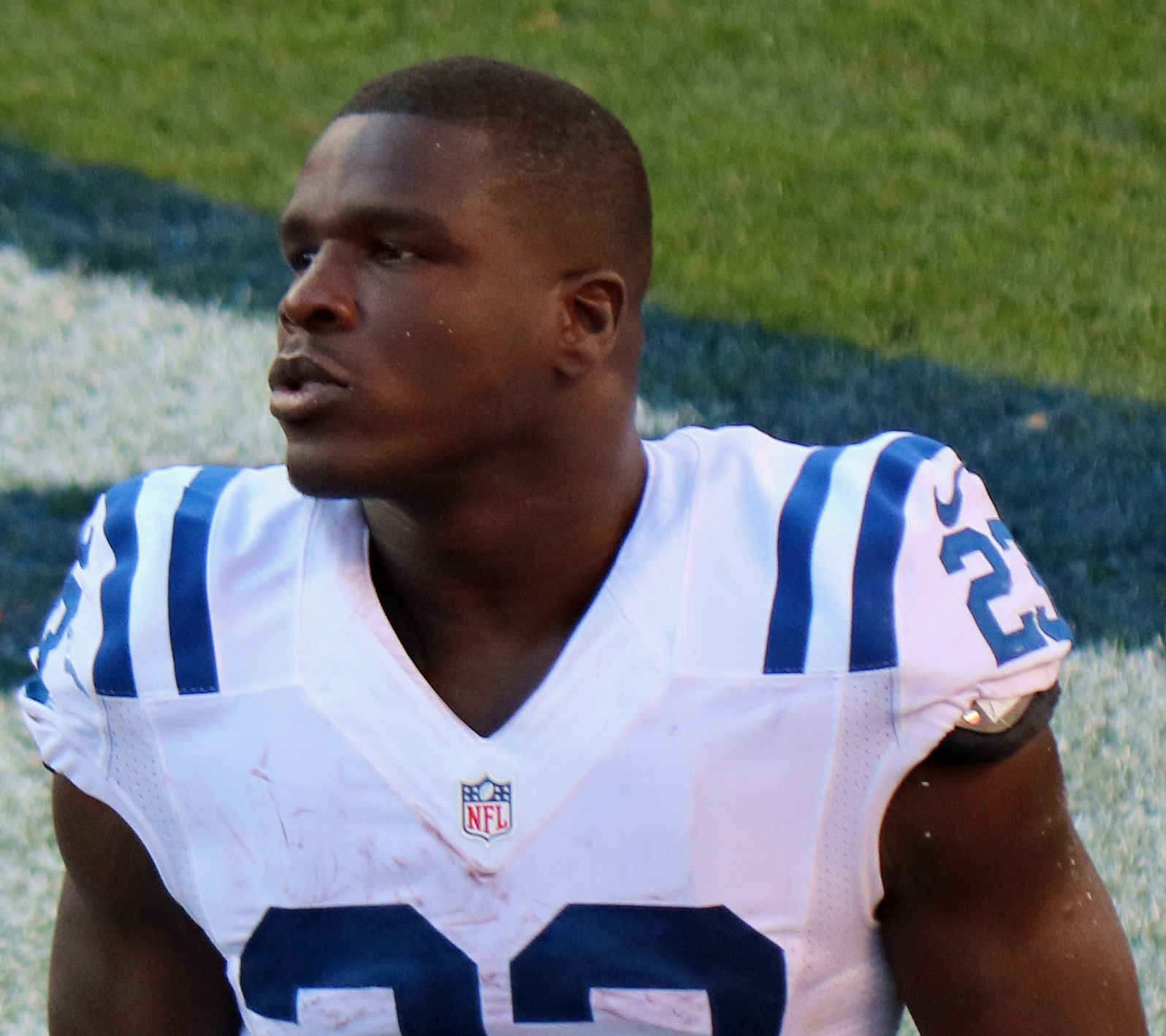
Gore with the Indianapolis Colts in 2016

In the first four games of the 2016 season, Gore averaged 63.3 rushing yards per game and scored three total touchdowns. During a Week 5 29–23 victory over the Chicago Bears, Gore rushed for 75 yards and surpassed Jim Brown in career rushing yards. Gore carried that momentum in the next game against the Houston Texans, rushing for 106 yards on 22 carries to become the Colts' first 100-yard rusher in 55 games. After the 26–23 overtime road loss to the Texans, Gore voiced his frustration with the team losing, saying "I didn't come here for this, I came here to get into the tournament."

During Week 8, Gore tied Terrell Owens, Marvin Harrison, Tim Brown, Cris Carter, Jerry Rice, and Don Hutson for the most consecutive seasons (11) with at least five touchdowns. In Week 15 against the Minnesota Vikings' third-ranked defense, Gore hit the century mark for the second time this season, rushing for 101 yards on 26 carries in the 34–6 road victory.

Gore finished the season with 263 carries for 1,025 yards and eight touchdowns to go along with 38 receptions for 277 yards and four touchdowns. The 2016 season marked the ninth time Gore rushed for 1,000 yards in his career. He joined Pro Football Hall of Famers Emmitt Smith (11), Curtis Martin (10), Walter Payton (10) and Barry Sanders (10) as the only players in NFL history to rush for 1,000 yards in at least nine different seasons. He became the Colts first running back to rush for 1,000 yards since Joseph Addai in 2007. He moved up seven more places to eighth on the all-time career rushing list.

==== 2017 season ====
During the 2017 offseason, Gore trained for the season in a familiar fashion, down in Miami working out with younger running backs from around the league. The Colts brought in competition at the running back position drafting Marlon Mack to compete for the starting job. Gore embraced the competition saying "to have depth to compete, I feel like everybody should have depth to compete at their position. The more people you've got, the hungrier that person should be. You know the guys from last year and adding the new young guys come training camp time the best man should win. If you love this game you're gonna step up to the plate."

For the first twelve games of the 2017 season, Gore averaged 52.7 yards per game and scored three total touchdowns. The last game in that stretch was meaningful to Gore as he passed both Jerome Bettis and LaDainian Tomlinson and move up to fifth on the all-time rushing list with 61 yards on the day. Playing against the Buffalo Bills in a blizzard and deep snow in Week 14, Gore had a career-high 36 rush attempts for 130 yards, his highest yardage total in his three years with the Colts, in the 13–7 overtime road loss. He was able to reach the century mark in the season's last game against the Houston Texans.

Gore finished the season with 961 rushing yards, bringing his career total to 14,026. He became the fifth player in NFL history to amass 14,000 rushing yards in his career, joining Emmitt Smith, Walter Payton, Barry Sanders, and Curtis Martin. On March 1, 2018, the Colts announced that they would not re-sign Gore, allowing him to become a free agent at the start of the new league year.

=== Miami Dolphins ===
On March 22, 2018, Gore signed a one-year contract, worth $1,105,000, with his hometown team, the Miami Dolphins.

Gore shared the backfield with Kenyan Drake and rookie Kalen Ballage. With his five-yard rush in the third quarter of a Week 2 20–12 road victory over the New York Jets, Gore passed Curtis Martin for fourth-most rushing yards all time with 14,103. Two weeks later against the New England Patriots, Gore caught a six-yard touchdown from Brock Osweiler in the 38–7 road loss. During a Week 6 31–28 overtime victory over the Chicago Bears, Gore recorded 15 carries for 101 rushing yards. During a Week 15 41–17 road loss to the Minnesota Vikings, Gore rushed for 14 yards before suffering a sprained foot and was ruled out for the rest of the season.

Gore finished the 2018 season with 156 carries for 722 yards to go along with 12 receptions for 124 yards and a touchdown. The 2018 season was the first time in his career where he did not record a rushing touchdown.

=== Buffalo Bills ===
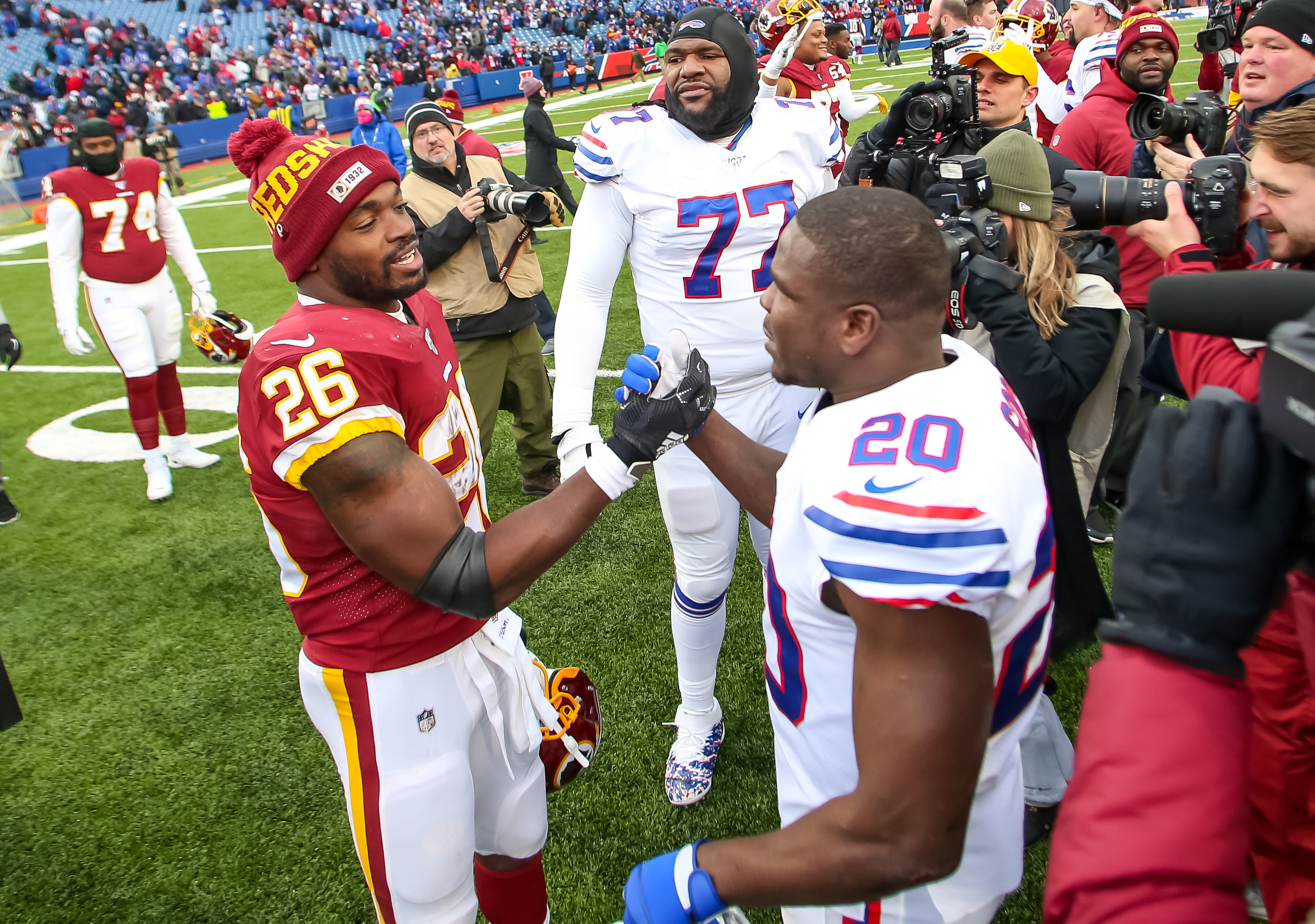
Gore and fellow back Adrian Peterson after a game against the Washington Redskins, 2019

On March 13, 2019, Gore signed a one-year, $2 million contract with the Buffalo Bills.

After rushing for 20 yards on twelve carries against the New York Jets to start the 2019 season, Gore had 19 carries for 68 rushing yards and his first rushing touchdown since Week 12 of the 2017 season in the 28–14 victory over the New York Giants in Week 2. During a Week 4 16–10 loss to the defending Super Bowl champion New England Patriots, Gore became the fourth player in NFL history to run for 15,000 yards after rushing 17 times for 109 yards. He also became the second-oldest player in NFL history with a 100+ yard rushing game, 61 days younger than MacArthur Lane in 1978. During a Week 12 20–3 victory over against the Denver Broncos, Gore ran for 65 yards and surpassed Barry Sanders' career total of 15,269 rushing yards for third place all time. This was Gore's 15th season with at least 500 rushing yards, an NFL record.

Gore finished the 2019 season with 166 carries for 599 yards and two touchdowns to go along with 13 receptions for 100 yards in 16 games and eight starts. He ended up leading the team in carries while sharing the backfield with rookie Devin Singletary. With the Bills appearing in the wild-card round of the playoffs, Gore made his first postseason appearance since his time with the 49ers in the 2013 season. Against the Houston Texans, Gore had eight carries for 22 yards in the 22–19 overtime road loss. Gore was named to the Pro Football Hall of Fame All-Decade Team for the 2010s.

=== New York Jets ===
On May 6, 2020, Gore signed a one-year deal with the New York Jets. During a Week 11 34–28 road loss to the Los Angeles Chargers, Gore ran for 61 yards and his first touchdown of the season. In Week 15, Gore set the NFL record for most games played by a running back, passing Lorenzo Neal. On December 30, he was placed on injured reserve. Gore finished the season as the Jets' leading rusher with 653 yards and two touchdowns to go along with 16 catches for 89 yards.

=== Retirement ===
On April 3, 2022, Gore said that he planned to sign a one-day contract with the San Francisco 49ers and retire as a member of the team that drafted him. He finished his career with exactly 16,000 rushing yards, the third most in NFL history.

On June 2, 2022, Gore announced his retirement after signing a one-day contract with the 49ers.

== Career statistics ==
Legend
**Bold**	Career high

=== NFL ===
==== Regular season ====
Year	Team	Games		Rushing					Receiving					Fumbles		Other TDs
Year	Team	GP	GS	Att	Yds	Avg	Lng	TD	Rec	Yds	Avg	Lng	TD	Fum	Lost	Other TDs
2005	SF	14	1	127	608	4.8	72T	3	15	131	8.7	47	0	2	2	—
2006	SF	16	16	**312**	**1,695**	**5.4**	72	8	**61**	**485**	8.0	39	1	**6**	**5**	—
2007	SF	15	15	260	1,102	4.2	43T	5	53	436	8.2	23T	1	4	3	—
2008	SF	14	14	240	1,036	4.3	41T	6	43	373	8.7	26	2	6	3	—
2009	SF	14	14	229	1,120	4.9	**80T**	**10**	52	406	7.8	48	3	4	2	—
2010	SF	11	11	203	853	4.2	64	3	46	452	9.8	41	2	4	2	—
2011	SF	16	15	282	1,211	4.3	55	8	17	114	6.7	13	0	2	2	—
2012	SF	16	16	258	1,214	4.7	37	8	28	234	8.4	26	1	2	1	**1**
2013	SF	16	16	276	1,128	4.1	51	9	16	141	8.8	29	0	3	3	—
2014	SF	16	16	255	1,106	4.3	52T	4	11	111	10.1	**55T**	1	2	2	—
2015	IND	16	16	260	967	3.7	37T	6	34	267	7.9	34	1	4	3	—
2016	IND	16	16	263	1,025	3.9	22	4	38	277	7.3	49	**4**	2	1	—
2017	IND	16	16	261	961	3.7	21	3	29	245	8.4	26	1	3	0	—
2018	MIA	14	14	156	722	4.6	39	0	12	124	**10.3**	24	1	1	0	—
2019	BUF	16	8	166	599	3.6	41	2	13	100	7.7	18	0	0	0	—
2020	NYJ	15	14	187	653	3.5	17	2	16	89	5.6	9	0	1	1	—
Career		241	218	3,735	16,000	4.3	80T	81	484	3,985	8.2	55	18	47	31	1

==== Postseason ====
Year	Team	Games		Rushing					Receiving					Fumbles	
Year	Team	GP	GS	Att	Yds	Avg	Lng	TD	Rec	Yds	Avg	Lng	TD	Fum	Lost
2011	SF	2	2	29	163	**5.6**	**42**	0	**13**	**83**	6.4	24	0	**1**	0
2012	SF	3	3	**63**	**319**	5.1	33	**4**	2	48	**24.0**	**45**	0	0	0
2013	SF	3	3	48	164	3.4	39	3	3	36	12.0	17	0	0	0
2019	BUF	1	1	8	22	2.8	14	0	0	0	0.0	0	0	0	0
Career		9	9	148	668	4.5	42	7	18	167	9.3	45	0	1	0

=== College ===
Season	Team	GP	Rushing				Receiving			
Season	Team	GP	Att	Yds	Avg	TD	Rec	Yds	Avg	TD
2001	Miami (FL)	11	62	562	**9.1**	5	1	14	**14.0**	0
2003	Miami (FL)	5	89	468	5.3	4	**12**	105	8.8	0
2004	Miami (FL)	12	**197**	**945**	4.8	**8**	10	**106**	10.6	0
Career		28	348	1,975	5.7	17	23	225	9.8	0

== Career highlights ==
=== Awards and honors ===
NFL

- 5× Pro Bowl (2006, 2009, 2011, 2012, 2013)
- Second-team All-Pro (2006)
- NFL 2010s All-Decade Team
- NFC champion (2012)
- PFWA All-NFC (2006)
- PFWA Most Improved Player of the Year (2006)
- 10,000 Rushing Yards Club
- Art Rooney Award (2016)
- San Francisco 49ers Hall of Fame
- 4× NFL Top 100 — 94th (2011), 28th (2012), 32nd (2013), 46th (2014)
- 5× NFC Offensive Player of the Week (Week 5, 2006; Week 11, 2006; Week 12, 2007; Week 2, 2009; Week 14, 2009)

College

- BCS national champion (2001)
- ACC Brian Piccolo Award (2004)
- Second-team All-ACC (2004)
- University of Miami Sports Hall of Fame (2018)

=== Records ===
==== NFL records ====
- Most seasons with 1,200 yards from scrimmage: 12
- Most consecutive seasons with at least 500 yards rushing: 16
- Most consecutive seasons with at least 600 yards rushing: 14
- Most consecutive seasons with at least 700 yards rushing: 13 (tied with Emmitt Smith)
- Most career games by an NFL running back: 241
- Most consecutive seasons with at least five touchdowns: 11 – tied with Terrell Owens, Marvin Harrison, Tim Brown, Cris Carter, Jerry Rice, and Don Hutson
- First player in NFL history with 12 consecutive 1,200-yards from scrimmage seasons.
- One of five RBs in NFL history with at least nine 1,000-yard seasons, joining Emmitt Smith, Walter Payton, Barry Sanders, and Curtis Martin.
- One of four RBs in NFL history with 15,000 career rushing yards, joining Emmitt Smith, Walter Payton, and Barry Sanders.
- Third all-time in career rushing yards.

==== 49ers franchise records ====
- Most rushing yards in a career: 11,073
- Most rushing yards in a game: 212 (Week 11, 2006)
- Most 100-yard games in a season: 9 (2006)
- Most rushing yards in a three-game span: 505 (Weeks 10–12, 2006)
- Most consecutive games with 100 yards: 5 (Weeks 4–9, 2011)
- Most rushing yards in a season: 1,695 (2006)
- Most scrimmage yards in a season: 2,180 (2006)

== Post-playing career ==
=== Boxing career ===
After his football career, Gore devoted himself to boxing, in the heavyweight category, first playing an exhibition match in 2021 against former NBA player Deron Williams and then making his professional debut on May 14, 2022, winning the match against Olaseyinde Olorunsola by knockout.

==== Boxing record ====
Professional record

2 fights	2 wins	0 losses
By knockout	2	0

No.	Result	Record	Opponent	Type	Round, time	Date	Location	Notes
2	Win	2–0	Joshua Romero	TKO	1 (4)	December 3, 2022	San Antonio, Texas	
1	Win	1–0	Olaseyinde Olorunsola	KO	4 (4)	May 14, 2022	Biloxi, Mississippi	

Exhibition record

1 fight	0 wins	1 loss
By decision	0	1

No.	Result	Record	Opponent	Type	Round, time	Date	Location	Notes
1	Loss	0–1	Deron Williams	SD	4	Dec 18, 2021	Amalie Arena, Tampa, Florida, U.S.	

=== 49ers advisory ===
On July 29, 2023, the 49ers hired Gore to join their office as a football advisor for the club.

== Personal life ==
Gore Sr.'s eldest son, Frank Gore Jr., was born in 2002 while Gore Sr. was in college at the University of Miami. Gore Jr. followed in his father's footsteps and plays running back. Gore Sr. did not plan for his son to end up playing football, remarking:

"Whatever he wants to do, he's going to do it; not because I played ball, he has to play ball. Me seeing him when he was a little kid playing outside with his bigger cousins, I knew he was going to play football, but if he doesn't want to play, as long as he gets his grades and does something positive with his life, I'm okay with it."

Due to his NFL career, Frank Gore Sr. was unable to see his son play in local football games past the age of 5 until his return to Miami 13 years later when he signed with the Miami Dolphins. On December 19, 2019, Gore Jr., a three-star prospect, committed to play football at University of Southern Mississippi after also receiving offers from the University of Tennessee at Chattanooga and Florida Atlantic University. In 2024, Gore Jr. signed with the Buffalo Bills as an undrafted free agent; Gore Sr. praised Bills general manager Brandon Beane for the signing, calling him "the real deal" and promising that Gore Jr. would live up to his family name: "I know what I’m raising... My bloodline is for real... We’re coming to play. Buffalo got a dog; I promise you that."

=== Charitable work ===
On April 12, 2018, Gore was honored by Miami Mayor Francis Suarez and given the 'Keys to the City'. As per Mayor Suarez, Gore "symbolizes the very soul of [Miami], is a product of our city, a product of the West Grove, where so many families for so many generations have grown up together." While receiving applause, Gore asked for his family and friends in attendance at the event to stand to be honored as well. In Gore's view, it was equally important to thank and honor those who had been with him throughout all the hardships he had faced in his life, including "growing up in a one-bedroom apartment with twelve people as a kid". Mayor Suarez proclaimed April 12 as "Frank Gore Day".

== See also ==
- List of male boxers
- List of multi-sport athletes
- List of National Football League career all-purpose yards leaders
- List of National Football League career rushing attempts leaders
- List of National Football League career rushing touchdowns leaders
- List of National Football League career rushing yards leaders
- List of NFL players by games played
