= NFL rushing yards leaders =

NFL rushing yards leaders may refer to:

- List of NFL annual rushing yards leaders
- List of NFL career rushing yards leaders
