= NFL rushing touchdowns leaders =

NFL rushing touchdowns leaders may refer to:

- List of NFL annual rushing touchdowns leaders
- List of NFL career rushing touchdowns leaders
