= Marcus Allen =

American football player (born 1960)

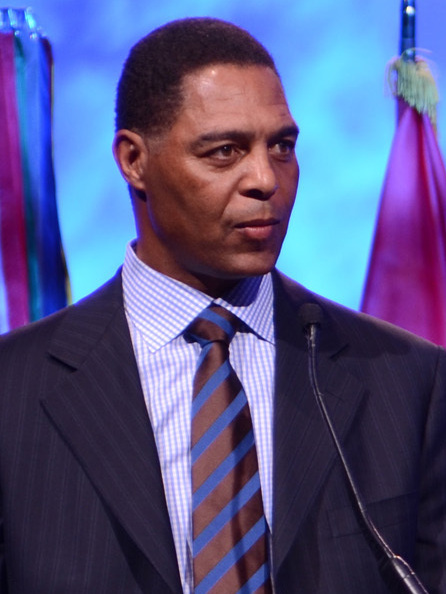
- Allen in 2013

No. 32
- Position: Running back

Personal information
- Born: March 26, 1960 (age 66); San Diego, California, U.S.
- Listed height: 6 ft 2 in (1.88 m)
- Listed weight: 210 lb (95 kg)

Career information
- High school: Lincoln (San Diego)
- College: USC (1978–1981)
- NFL draft: 1982: 1st round, 10th overall pick

Career history
- Los Angeles Raiders (1982–1992); Kansas City Chiefs (1993–1997)

Awards and highlights
- Super Bowl champion (XVIII); Super Bowl MVP (XVIII); NFL Most Valuable Player (1985); NFL Offensive Player of the Year (1985); NFL Offensive Rookie of the Year (1982); NFL Comeback Player of the Year (1993); 2× First-team All-Pro (1982, 1985); Second-team All-Pro (1984); 6× Pro Bowl (1982, 1984–1987, 1993); 2× NFL rushing touchdowns leader (1982, 1993); NFL rushing yards leader (1985); NFL scoring leader (1982); AFCA National Championship Trophy (1978); Heisman Trophy (1981); Unanimous All-American (1981); Second-team All-American (1980); NCAA rushing yards leader (1981); NCAA rushing touchdowns leader (1981); NCAA scoring leader (1981); USC Trojans No. 33 retired

Career NFL statistics
- Rushing yards: 12,243
- Rushing average: 4.1
- Rushing touchdowns: 123
- Receptions: 587
- Receiving yards: 5,411
- Receiving touchdowns: 21
- Stats at Pro Football Reference
- Pro Football Hall of Fame
- College Football Hall of Fame

Marcus LeMarr Allen (born March 26, 1960) is an American former professional football running back who played in the National Football League (NFL) for 16 seasons, primarily with the Los Angeles Raiders. Considered one of the greatest goal line and short-yard runners in NFL history, he was selected 10th overall by the Raiders in the 1982 NFL draft, following a successful college football career with the USC Trojans. He was a member of the Raiders for 11 seasons and spent his last five seasons with the Kansas City Chiefs.

During his professional career, Allen ran for 12,243 yards and caught 587 passes for 5,412 yards. He also scored 145 touchdowns, including a then-league-record 123 rushing touchdowns, and was elected to six Pro Bowls. While with the Raiders, he helped the team win Super Bowl XVIII. He was the first NFL player to gain more than 10,000 rushing yards and 5,000 receiving yards during his career. Allen has the distinction of being the only player to have won the Heisman Trophy, be named Unanimous All-American, won an AFCA National Championship Trophy, the Super Bowl, and be named NFL MVP and Super Bowl MVP. He was inducted to the College Football Hall of Fame in 2000, the Pro Football Hall of Fame in 2003, and the International Sports Hall of Fame in 2021.

== Early life ==
Allen played football at Abraham Lincoln High School in San Diego, California, where he played the quarterback and safety positions. Watching Allen in the 1977 CIF Title game against Kearny High School, one saw the emergence of a superstar. Allen led the Lincoln team to a 34–6 victory, scoring five touchdowns, including one after intercepting a pass. Allen rushed for 195 yards. Allen won the Cal-Hi Sports Mr. Football, awarded to California's best high school football player, in 1977.

== College career ==
Allen played running back at the University of Southern California (USC) from 1978 to 1981, playing on the same team as fellow hall of famer Ronnie Lott for his first three seasons and hall of famer Anthony Munoz for his first two. He was recruited as a safety, but head coach John Robinson switched him to tailback. As a freshman in 1978, Allen was a member of the Trojans' National Championship team (as recognized by the coaches poll), playing as a backup to eventual Heisman Trophy winning running back Charles White.

In 1979, he was moved to fullback, recording 879 yards from scrimmage. Eventually, in 1980, Allen became the starter at tailback and rushed for 1,563 yards, the third-most in the nation that year (behind George Rogers of S. Carolina – 1,781 yards and Herschel Walker of Georgia – 1,616). In 1981, Allen rushed for 2,342 yards, becoming only the second player in NCAA history to rush for over 2,000 yards in one season, passing the 2,000-yard mark in a win at Cal. He also gained a total of 2,559 offensive yards, led the nation in scoring, and won the Heisman Trophy, the Maxwell Award, and Walter Camp Award. He was also the Pac-10 Player of the Year. Allen shares the NCAA record for most 200-yard rushing games with Ricky Williams and Ron Dayne, each completing the feat twelve times.

Allen finished his four college seasons with 4,682 rushing yards, 5,403 scrimmage yards, and 47 touchdowns, while averaging 5.2 yards per carry. USC has retired his jersey No. 33.

== Professional career ==
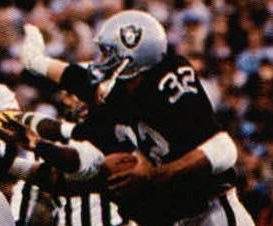
Allen led the Raiders to a championship in Super Bowl XVIII and earned MVP honors as he rushed for a record of 191 yards, including a memorable 74-yard touchdown run.

Allen was drafted as the 10th overall pick in the 1982 NFL draft by the Los Angeles Raiders. Allen was pleased that he didn't have to travel as the team had just relocated from Oakland. Allen has recalled that shortly before he was drafted, the Raiders asked him his weight (he answered 200 or 212) and then drafted him soon after. Though his rookie season was shortened by a league strike, Allen rushed for 697 yards and led the Raiders to the best record in the AFC at 8–1. He was voted the NFL Offensive Rookie of the Year. The Raiders lost to the New York Jets in the AFC Divisional Playoffs.

The next season, Allen broke the 1,000-yard mark for the first time, an accomplishment he would repeat the two following years. During the 1985 season, he rushed for 1,759 yards and scored 11 touchdowns on 380 carries, leading the Raiders to a 12–4 record and the AFC West Division Championship. In addition, Allen was named the NFL MVP.

In Super Bowl XVIII on January 22, 1984, Allen ran for 191 yards, caught two passes for 18 yards, and scored two touchdowns in the Raiders' 38–9 victory over the Washington Redskins. Included in his stats was a 74-yard touchdown run, a feat that remained the longest run in Super Bowl history until Willie Parker's 75-yard run in Super Bowl XL. Allen's 191 rushing yards were also a Super Bowl record, which stood until Timmy Smith of the Redskins topped it with 204 yards in Super Bowl XXII. Upon winning the game, Allen joined a small group of players to win both the Heisman Trophy and Super Bowl MVP (Roger Staubach, Jim Plunkett, and later Desmond Howard). In total, Allen rushed 58 times for 466 yards and four touchdowns during the playoffs. He also added 118 yards and one touchdown on 14 receptions.

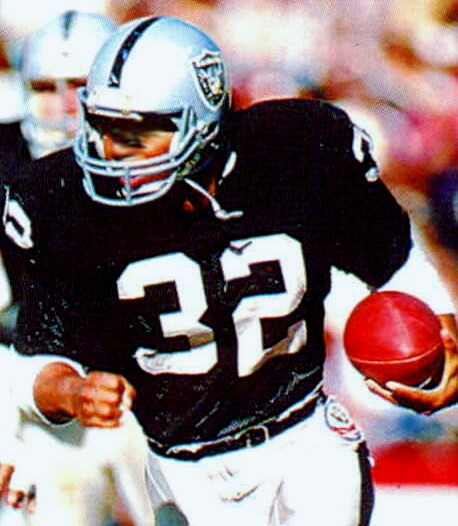
Allen playing for the Raiders in 1984 where he rushed for 1,168 yards, scored 18 touchdowns and led the Raiders to their third consecutive playoff appearance.

Allen ended the 1985 season on a strong note, finishing the year as the NFL rushing leader with 9 consecutive 100-yard games.

From 1987 through 1990, Allen shared the backfield with Bo Jackson. Initially, Allen was commended for his gracious nature and team spirit for sharing the spotlight during the prime of his career. In later seasons with the Raiders, Allen had a stormy relationship with owner Al Davis stemming from a contract dispute; Davis referred to Allen as a "cancer to the team." He also missed most of the 1989 season with a knee injury. Allen was relegated to back-up duty in his final three seasons with the Raiders and, at one time, fell to fourth on the depth chart. Allen's strained relationship with Davis reached an all-time low in December 1992. During halftime of the Raiders-Dolphins game on Monday Night Football, a taped interview between Al Michaels and Allen was broadcast in which Allen said that Davis "told me he was going to get me", adding, "I think he [Davis] tried to ruin the latter part of my career, tried to devalue me. He's trying to stop me from going to the Hall of Fame. They don't want me to play."

Allen eventually left the Raiders and joined the Kansas City Chiefs in 1993. Although he only rushed for 764 yards that year, he scored 12 touchdowns, leading the AFC, as he and Joe Montana led the Chiefs to the AFC Championship Game. Allen scored touchdowns in all three Chiefs playoff games that year, and was named the NFL Comeback Player of the Year by the Pro Football Writers Association. With the retirement of Eric Dickerson in 1993, Allen became the active leader in career rushing yards, a position he maintained until being passed by Barry Sanders in week 1 of 1997. Allen went on to play for the Chiefs for four more seasons, leading the team in rushing every year but his last.

Allen retired after the 1997 season. In 1999, he was ranked 72nd on The Sporting News' list of the 100 Greatest Football Players. Allen was inducted into the Pro Football Hall of Fame in 2003. Allen was also inducted into the California Sports Hall of Fame in 2007.

In 1999, Allen was also inducted into the San Diego Hall of Champions Breitbard Hall of Fame.

In 2008, Allen became a spokesman for the sports website OPENSports.com, the brainchild of Mike Levy, founder and former CEO of CBS Sportsline.com. Allen wrote a blog and occasionally answered member questions for the company during this time.

== Career statistics ==
Legend
	AP NFL MVP & OPOTY
	Super Bowl MVP
	Won the Super Bowl
	Led the league
**Bold**	Career high
Underline	Incomplete data

=== NFL ===
==== Regular season ====
Year	Team	Games		Rushing					Receiving					Fumbles	
Year	Team	GP	GS	Att	Yds	Y/A	Lng	TD	Rec	Yds	Y/R	Lng	TD	Fum	Lost
1982	LAR	9	9	160	697	4.4	53	11	38	401	10.6	51	3	5	—
1983	LAR	16	15	266	1,014	3.8	**74**	9	**68**	590	8.7	36	2	**14**	—
1984	LAR	16	16	275	1,168	4.2	52	**13**	64	**758**	11.8	**92**	**5**	8	—
1985	LAR	16	16	**380**	**1,759**	**4.6**	61	11	67	555	8.3	44	3	3	—
1986	LAR	13	10	208	759	3.6	28	5	46	453	9.8	36	2	7	—
1987	LAR	12	12	200	754	3.8	44	5	51	410	8.0	39	0	3	—
1988	LAR	15	15	223	831	3.7	32	7	34	303	8.9	30	1	5	—
1989	LAR	8	5	69	293	4.2	15	2	20	191	9.6	26	0	2	—
1990	LAR	16	15	179	682	3.8	28	12	15	189	**12.6**	30	1	1	—
1991	LAR	8	2	63	287	**4.6**	26	2	15	131	8.7	25	0	1	—
1992	LAR	16	0	67	301	4.5	21	2	28	277	9.9	40	1	1	—
1993	KC	16	10	206	764	3.7	39	12	34	238	7.0	18	3	4	—
1994	KC	13	13	189	709	3.8	36	7	42	349	8.3	38	0	3	**2**
1995	KC	16	15	207	890	4.3	38	5	27	210	7.8	20	0	2	1
1996	KC	16	15	206	830	4.0	35	9	27	270	10.0	59	0	2	0
1997	KC	16	0	124	505	4.1	30	11	11	86	7.8	18	0	4	**2**
Career		222	168	3,022	12,243	4.1	74	123	587	5,411	9.2	92	21	65	5

==== Postseason ====
Year	Team	Games		Rushing					Receiving					Fumbles	
Year	Team	GP	GS	Att	Yds	Y/A	Lng	TD	Rec	Yds	Y/R	Lng	TD	Fum	Lost
1982	RAI	2	2	32	108	3.4	13	3	12	112	9.3	35	0	**2**	—
1983	RAI	3	3	**58**	**466**	**8.0**	**74**	**4**	**14**	**118**	8.4	17	**1**	1	0
1984	RAI	1	1	17	61	3.6	15	0	5	90	**18.0**	**46**	**1**	1	—
1985	RAI	1	1	22	121	5.5	17	1	3	8	2.7	6	0	1	—
1990	RAI	2	2	31	166	5.4	20	0	3	43	14.3	24	0	0	0
1991	RAI	1	1	7	39	5.6	10	0	1	4	4.0	4	0	1	—
1993	KC	3	3	53	191	3.6	24	3	7	77	11.0	27	0	0	0
1994	KC	1	1	14	64	4.6	11	0	5	49	9.8	16	0	1	**1**
1995	KC	1	1	21	94	4.5	16	0	2	21	10.5	16	0	0	0
1997	KC	1	0	12	37	3.1	14	0	1	8	8.0	8	0	0	0
Career		16	15	267	1,347	5.0	74	11	53	530	10.0	46	2	7	1

=== College ===
Season	Rushing					Receiving				
Season	Att	Yds	Avg	Lng	TD	Rec	Yds	Avg	Lng	TD
1978	31	171	5.5	17	1	—	—	—	—	—
1979	105	606	**5.8**	38	8	20	**273**	**13.7**	34	0
1980	354	1,563	4.4	45	14	**30**	231	7.7	19	**1**
1981	**403**	**2,342**	**5.8**	**74**	**22**	29	217	7.5	**50**	**1**
Totals	893	4,682	5.2	74	45	79	721	9.1	50	2

== Career highlights ==
=== Awards and honors ===
NFL

- Super Bowl champion (XVIII)
- Super Bowl MVP (XVIII)
- NFL Most Valuable Player (1985)
- NFL Offensive Player of the Year (1985)
- NFL Offensive Rookie of the Year (1982)
- NFL Comeback Player of the Year (1993)
- 2× First-team All-Pro (1982, 1985)
- Second-team All-Pro (1984)
- 6× Pro Bowl (1982, 1984–1987, 1993)
- 2× NFL rushing touchdowns leader (1982, 1993)
- NFL rushing yards leader (1985)
- NFL scoring leader (1982)
- No. 85 on The Top 100: NFL's Greatest Players

College

- AFCA National Championship Trophy (1978)
- Heisman Trophy (1981)
- Maxwell Award (1981)
- Walter Camp Award (1981)
- UPI Player of the Year (1981)
- SN Player of the Year (1981)
- Chic Harley Award (1981)
- Unanimous All-American (1981)
- Second-team All-American (1980)
- NCAA rushing yards leader (1981)
- NCAA rushing touchdowns leader (1981)
- NCAA scoring leader (1981)
- Pac-10 Player of the Year (1981)
- Pop Warner Trophy (1981)
- 2× First-team All-Pac-10 (1980, 1981)
- USC Trojans No. 33 retired

=== NFL records ===
- Consecutive seasons with multiple touchdowns: 16 – (tied with Irving Fryar)
- Consecutive seasons with a rushing touchdown: 16
- Consecutive seasons with multiple rushing touchdowns: 16
- Oldest player to score 10+ touchdowns in a season: 37 years old

== Personal life ==
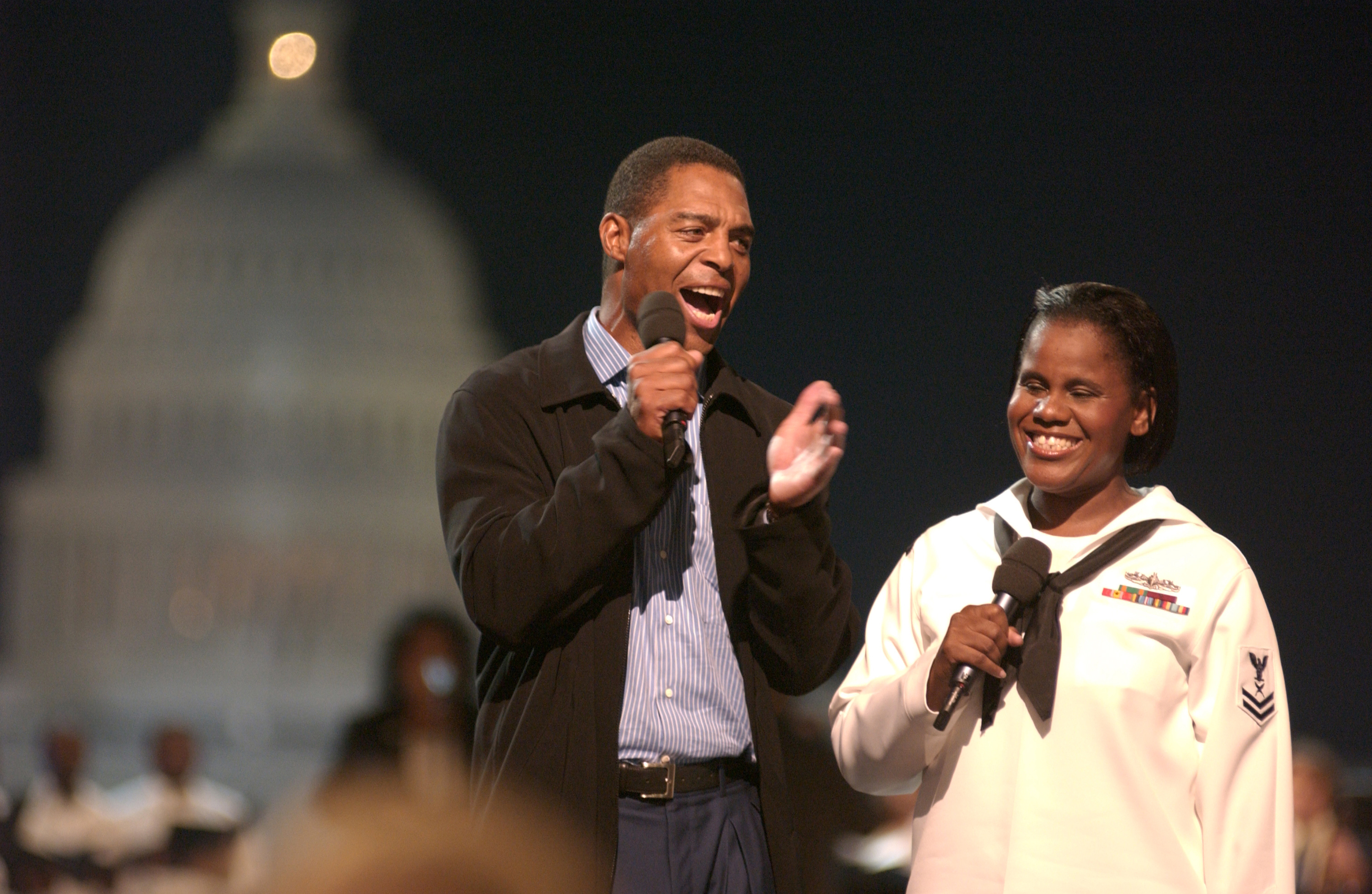
Marcus Allen with Yeoman 2nd Class Katherine Ward introduce Aretha Franklin during a concert in tribute to U.S. military members on the National Mall, September 4, 2003

In 1986, Allen met Kathryn Eickstaedt and the two later got engaged. They married in 1993 at O.J. Simpson's Rockingham estate, since Allen was friends with Simpson. Allen played the role of Rick Lambert in the sitcom 1st & Ten with Simpson in the mid-80s. Allen and Eickstaedt's engagement was mentioned in Faye Resnick's book, Nicole Brown Simpson: The Private Diary of a Life Interrupted, which was published during Simpson's murder trial. Resnick claimed Nicole Brown Simpson was having an affair with Allen, and Eickstaedt was aware of Allen's womanizing ways, and if she knew of the affair, she would have to call off the wedding. Sports agent Mike Gilbert (who had represented both Allen and Simpson) and actress Robin Greer both also claimed in O.J.: Made in America that Simpson and Allen had had a romantic relationship. Allen and Eickstaedt were summoned to testify in the trial but fought the subpoena as they wanted to stay out of it. The couple divorced in 2001.

Allen is the older brother of Canadian Football Hall of Fame quarterback Damon Allen.

== See also ==
- List of NCAA major college football yearly rushing leaders
- List of NCAA major college football yearly scoring leaders
- List of National Football League annual rushing touchdowns leaders
- List of National Football League rushing champions
- List of National Football League career rushing yards leaders
- List of National Football League career rushing attempts leaders
- List of National Football League career rushing touchdowns leaders
