= Curtis Martin =

American football player (born 1973)

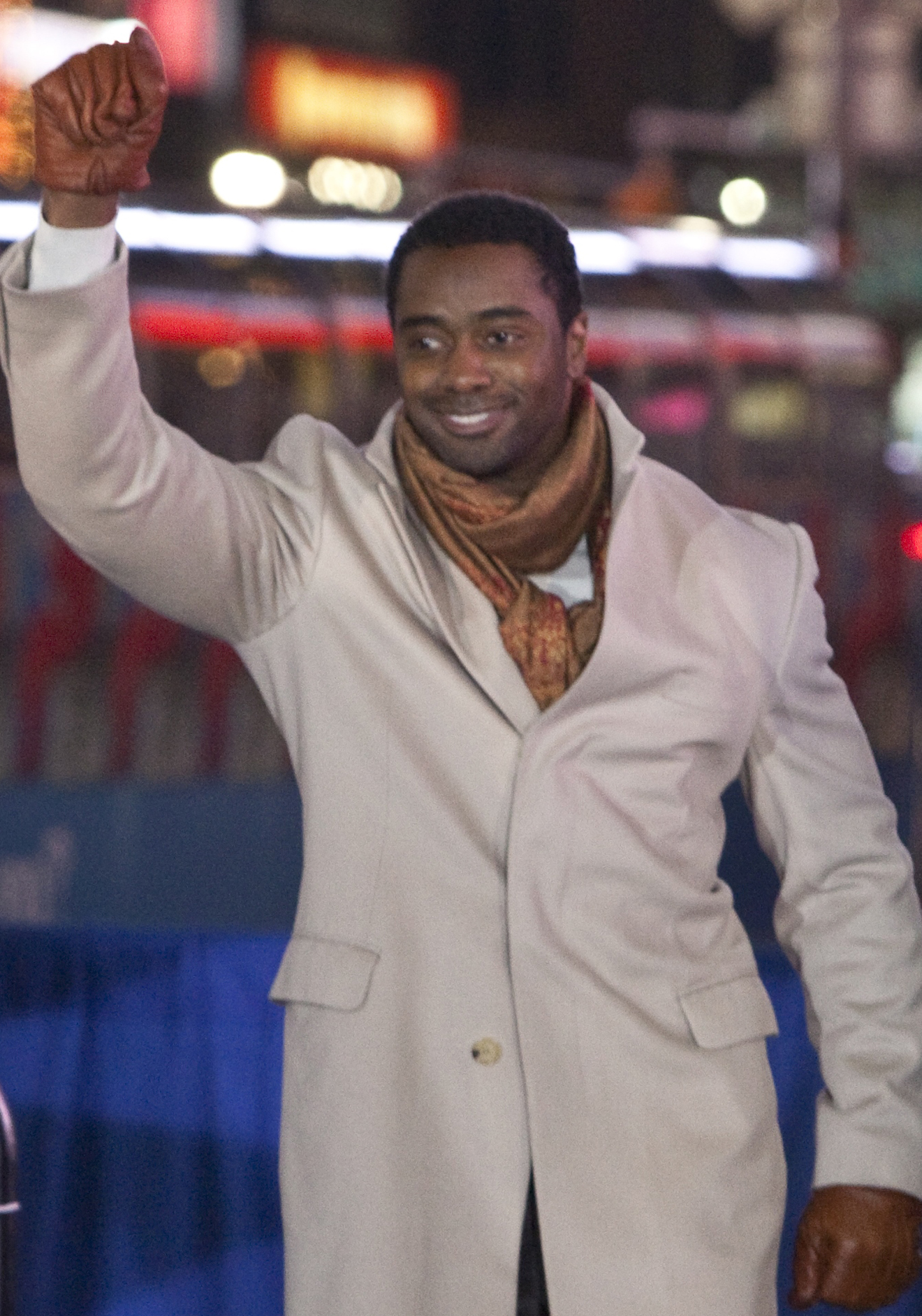
- Martin at a Times Square pep rally for the Jets in January 2010 prior to the AFC Championship Game

No. 28
- Position: Running back

Personal information
- Born: May 1, 1973 (age 53); Pittsburgh, Pennsylvania, U.S.
- Listed height: 5 ft 11 in (1.80 m)
- Listed weight: 210 lb (95 kg)

Career information
- High school: Allderdice (Pittsburgh)
- College: Pittsburgh (1991–1994)
- NFL draft: 1995: 3rd round, 74th overall pick

Career history
- New England Patriots (1995–1997); New York Jets (1998–2005)

Awards and highlights
- NFL Offensive Rookie of the Year (1995); First-team All-Pro (2004); 2× Second-team All-Pro (1999, 2001); 5× Pro Bowl (1995, 1996, 1998, 2001, 2004); NFL rushing yards leader (2004); PFWA All-Rookie Team (1995); New England Patriots All-1990s Team; New York Jets Ring of Honor; New York Jets No. 28 retired

Career NFL statistics
- Rushing yards: 14,101
- Yards per carry: 4
- Rushing touchdowns: 90
- Receptions: 484
- Receiving yards: 3,329
- Receiving touchdowns: 10
- Stats at Pro Football Reference
- Pro Football Hall of Fame

Curtis James Martin Jr. (born May 1, 1973) is an American former professional football running back who played in the National Football League (NFL) for 11 seasons, primarily with the New York Jets. He spent his first three NFL seasons with the New England Patriots, who selected him in the third round of the 1995 NFL draft, and was named NFL Offensive Rookie of the Year. Martin joined the Jets in 1998, where he spent eight seasons. At the conclusion of his career, he was selected to five Pro Bowls and one first-team All-Pro. He was inducted to the Pro Football Hall of Fame in 2012. He is sixth all-time in total NFL rushing yards.

== Early life ==
Curtis Jr. was born in Pittsburgh to Rochella Dixon and Curtis Sr. on May 1, 1973. Curtis Sr. left the family in 1978 after turning to drugs and alcohol, leaving Curtis's mother to support the family by working three jobs. During his youth, Curtis often moved around the various neighborhoods of Pittsburgh and was consistently surrounded by violence. His grandmother, Eleanor Johnson, was found murdered with a knife in her chest; at age 15, Martin had a near-death experience when the trigger of a loaded gun pointed at his head was pulled seven times, but never fired.

He and his mother settled in Point Breeze prior to his sophomore year of high school. He began attending Taylor Allderdice High School which was known for its highly regarded academic reputation. He played basketball as a sophomore, but did not participate in any sports during his junior year. At the insistence of his mother, who wanted him to participate in an extracurricular activity as a way to keep him away from crime and violence, Curtis began to play football during his senior year, despite having never cared much for the sport.

Martin was considered a natural athlete, according to former head coach Mark Wittgartner and became an immediate star on the football team. He played at the running back and linebacker positions. He also played on special teams and occasionally at quarterback. He ran for 1,705 yards and scored 20 touchdowns in his lone season of high school football. Martin graduated from Allderdice in 1991 and was inducted into their alumni hall of fame in 2011.

Martin's performance at Allderdice attracted the attention of the University of Pittsburgh's football coach Paul Hackett. Though other offers were available, Martin decided to remain close to home and attend Pittsburgh.

== College career ==
Martin, whom Hackett likened to Tony Dorsett, was expected to be a valued contributor to the Panthers when he arrived in 1991. However, injuries plagued much of his college career. As a junior, he rushed for 1,045 yards and caught 33 passes for 249 yards in ten games but he missed the final two with a sprained shoulder. In 1994, Martin opened his senior year running for a career-high 251 yards against Texas; however, the following week against Ohio he suffered a sprained ankle that sidelined him for the rest of the season.

Martin had the option to redshirt and play one more season at Pittsburgh or enter the NFL draft. He chose to enter the draft stating "in the end it was the best thing to do". Draft analysts predicted that had Martin stayed another season at Pittsburgh and remained injury-free he could have been a potential first-round selection. Martin was highly touted for his speed—he ran a 4.4 in the 40-yard dash—and his slashing running style.

== Professional career ==
Pre-draft measurables
Height	Weight	Arm length	Hand span	20-yard shuttle	Vertical jump	Broad jump	Bench press
5 ft 11 1/4 in (1.81 m)	203 lb (92 kg)	31 7/8 in (0.81 m)	9 1/4 in (0.23 m)	4.10 s	41.5 in (1.05 m)	10 ft 11 in (3.33 m)	16 reps
All values from the 1995 NFL Combine

=== New England Patriots ===
The Patriots lost three running backs to free agency upon the conclusion of the 1994 season and sought to fortify their backfield. One running back, Kevin Turner, was signed by the Philadelphia Eagles as a restricted free agent and Philadelphia sent a third round selection to New England. The Patriots used the selection to draft Martin in the 1995 NFL draft despite concerns about his durability. Martin signed a contract with the team on July 19, 1995, and made his NFL debut in the Patriots' week one win over the Cleveland Browns. Martin ran for 30 yards on his first carry and finished with 102 yards for the day. He became the first Patriots rookie to rush for 100 yards during their debut. Martin continued his impressive streak and rushed for over 100 yards eight more times during the season. He finished the season as the AFC's leading rusher with 1,487 yards and 14 touchdowns. He won the Offensive Rookie of the Year Award and was named to the Pro Bowl.

The following year, Martin only rushed for 100 yards twice during the season but recorded 1,152 yards and 14 rushing touchdowns. In the playoffs, Martin, playing in his first career playoff game, served as a key player in the Patriots' Divisional Playoff victory over the Pittsburgh Steelers. He rushed for a then franchise-record 166 yards and three touchdowns including a 78-yard touchdown, the second-longest touchdown run in playoff history at the time. The Patriots went on to play in Super Bowl XXXI, but lost to the Green Bay Packers. Martin rushed for 42 yards, caught three passes for 28 yards, and scored a touchdown in the game. It was at this game that a young Adrian Peterson fell in love with his hero Curtis Martin and vowed to wear the number 28 in his honor. Martin was again named to the Pro Bowl.

=== New York Jets ===
After the 1997 season, Martin became a restricted free agent. On the first day of the free agency period Martin's agent, Eugene Parker, contacted the New York Jets to gauge their interest in potentially signing the running back. Negotiations ensued between Parker and Jets head coach and general manager Bill Parcells (who had left New England not long before) and an offer sheet was formulated. Though Martin had reservations about playing in New York and particularly for a division rival, the presence of his former coach Parcells influenced his decision to ultimately join the Jets. On March 20, 1998, Martin signed a six-year, $36-million poison pill contract. The "poison pill" was a clause in the contract that stated Martin would become an unrestricted free agent after one year if the Patriots matched the offer and it would have forced New England to pay a $3.3 million roster bonus that would have compromised their salary cap. Under these conditions, the Patriots did not match the offer; however, they received the Jets' first and third round selections in the 1998 NFL draft as compensation after filing a complaint with the NFL management council, claiming the offer sheet violated the terms of the league's collective bargaining agreement at the time.

In his first seven seasons with the Jets, Martin missed only one game and was selected to the Pro Bowl three times. In 1998, Martin gained 182 yards from scrimmage and scored two touchdowns against the Jacksonville Jaguars in a Jets playoff win. In 2004, Martin rushed for a season-high 196 yards against the Cincinnati Bengals in the team's home opener, and would rush for over 100 yards eight more times that season, finishing with 1,697 yards. Martin won the NFL rushing title by one more yard than runner-up Shaun Alexander and became the oldest player, at age 31, in league history to win the rushing title. Martin was named the FedEx Ground Player of the Year and named an All-Pro and elected to his fifth and final Pro Bowl.

With the retirement of Emmitt Smith after 2004, Martin entered 2005 as the active leader in career rushing yards. In 2005, Martin suffered what was deemed as a strained right knee injury in the Jets' second game of the season against the Miami Dolphins, when he was tackled by linebacker Zach Thomas. An MRI of the knee was negative and Martin continued to play through the season despite a noticeable drop-off in production, having only rushed for 100 or more yards once the entire season. On November 27, 2005, Martin joined Barry Sanders, Walter Payton and Emmitt Smith as the only running backs to rush for 14,000 yards in their career. By December, the severity of the knee injury began to increase and Martin, despite wanting to become the second player (after Smith) to rush for 1,000 yards in 11 straight seasons, elected to have season-ending surgery, finishing with 735 yards on the season. Martin began 2006 on the Physically Unable to Perform list as the post-operation recovery period took longer than expected though the surgery was considered minimally invasive. By November 2006, despite months of rehabilitation, Martin was declared out for the season with a bone-on-bone condition in his right knee. After re-negotiating his contract to help provide more salary cap room for the Jets, Martin announced his retirement in July 2007 thus ending his career having amassed 14,101 total rushing yards, the fifth highest total in NFL history.

=== Post-retirement ===
Following his retirement, Martin expressed interest in becoming the owner of an NFL franchise. He continued to involve himself in various charity work including through the Curtis Martin Job Foundation, established by Martin during his playing career, designed to provide "financial aid and hands-on support to single mothers, children's charities, individuals with disabilities and low income housing providers".

Martin was considered for induction into the Pro Football Hall of Fame in his first year of eligibility in 2011; however, he was not selected. Martin was again a leading candidate for selection in 2012 alongside former head coach and mentor Bill Parcells. He was selected for induction on February 4, 2012, and formally inducted on August 4, 2012. Martin's speech, which he conducted without notes, was widely praised by critics for its sincerity.

The Jets retired Martin's No. 28 jersey in a halftime ceremony at New York's season-opening game against the Buffalo Bills on September 9, 2012.

On November 11, 2013, Martin was added to the Miami Dolphins' five-man committee to develop the conduct code by owner Stephen M. Ross following a locker room hazing incident involving Richie Incognito and Jonathan Martin.

== Personal life ==
In 1998, on Father's Day, Martin and his mother Rochella began a long reconciliation process with his father, Curtis Sr., by renting a new, furnished condominium for his father, who had left the family due to his addictions to cocaine and alcohol. In 1990, Curtis Sr. checked into a veteran's hospital for two weeks followed by a six-month stay at a rehabilitation center and was able to remain sober until his death from cancer, in June 2009 at age 58. The family members made peace with each other in the final weeks of the elder Martin's life.

Martin married his longtime girlfriend Carolina Williams in a ceremony held at Oheka Castle in Huntington, Long Island in 2010. On December 15, 2011, the couple welcomed their first child, a daughter named Ava.

Martin became a Christian at age 20, and wore the number 28 because of Deuteronomy 28.

== NFL career statistics ==
Legend
	Led the league
**Bold**	Career high

=== Regular season ===
Year	Team	Games		Rushing					Receiving					Fumbles	
Year	Team	GP	GS	Att	Yds	Avg	Lng	TD	Rec	Yds	Avg	Lng	TD	Fum	Lost
1995	NE	16	15	368	1,487	4.0	49	**14**	30	261	**8.7**	27	1	**5**	**3**
1996	NE	16	15	316	1,152	3.6	57	**14**	46	333	7.2	**41**	**3**	4	**3**
1997	NE	13	13	274	1,160	4.2	**70**	4	41	296	7.2	22	1	3	2
1998	NYJ	15	15	369	1,287	3.5	60	8	43	365	8.5	23	1	**5**	1
1999	NYJ	16	16	367	1,464	4.0	50	5	45	259	5.8	34	0	2	0
2000	NYJ	16	16	316	1,204	3.8	55	9	**70**	**508**	7.3	31	2	2	2
2001	NYJ	16	16	333	1,513	4.5	47	10	53	320	6.0	27	0	2	2
2002	NYJ	16	16	261	1,094	4.2	35	7	49	362	7.4	28	0	0	0
2003	NYJ	16	16	323	1,308	4.0	56	2	42	262	6.2	29	0	2	2
2004	NYJ	16	16	**371**	**1,697**	**4.6**	25	12	41	245	6.0	22	2	2	0
2005	NYJ	12	12	220	735	3.3	49	5	24	118	4.9	14	0	2	1
Total		168	166	3,518	14,101	4.0	70	90	484	3,329	6.9	41	10	29	16

=== Playoffs ===
Year	Team	Games		Rushing					Receiving					Fumbles	
Year	Team	GP	GS	Att	Yds	Avg	Lng	TD	Rec	Yds	Avg	Lng	TD	Fum	Lost
1996	NE	3	3	**49**	**267**	5.4	**78**	**5**	8	55	6.9	20	0	0	0
1998	NYJ	2	2	**49**	138	2.8	15	3	**10**	**97**	**9.7**	**27**	0	**2**	**2**
2001	NYJ	1	1	16	106	**6.6**	22	0	6	34	5.7	20	0	1	1
2002	NYJ	2	2	31	141	4.5	15	0	5	43	8.6	19	0	0	0
2004	NYJ	2	2	37	143	3.9	13	0	8	76	8.5	23	0	0	0
Total		10	10	182	795	4.4	78	8	37	305	8.2	27	0	3	3

== Awards and honors ==
Award/Honor	Time(s)	Year(s)
NFL Offensive Rookie of the Year	1	1995
PFWA Offensive Rookie of the Year	1	1995
Pro Bowl	5	1995, 1996, 1998, 2001, 2004
All-Pro	3	2004 (First-team); 1999, 2001 (Second-team)
UPI And Pro Football Weekly All-AFC	4	1995, 2001, 2004 (First-team) 1996 (Second-team)
Lead the American Football Conference in rushing yards	2	1995, 2004
Lead the American Football Conference in touchdowns	1	1996
Ed Block Courage Award	1	2001
Led the NFL in rushing yards (1,697)	1	2004
Oldest player to win the rushing title in NFL history (age 31)	1	2004
FedEx Ground Player of the Year	1	2004
Bart Starr Man Of The Year	1	2006
Fourth leading rusher of all-time (14,101 yards)	—	2007
Second player to have the most seasons with 1,000 yards or more rushing	—	2007
Second player to start with 10 consecutive 1,000-yard rushing seasons	—	2007
Third Most Career Rushing Attempts (3,518)	—	2007
Tenth all-time in combined net yards (17,421)	—	2007
Third most consecutive regular season starts by position (119)	—	2007

== See also ==
- List of National Football League career rushing yards leaders
- List of National Football League career rushing touchdowns leaders
- List of National Football League career rushing attempts leaders
