= List of NFL career rushing touchdowns leaders =

This is a list of National Football League (NFL) players by total career rushing touchdowns. This list includes all players with at least 75.

Emmitt Smith is the all-time leader with 164. He also leads in postseason touchdowns with 19. Cam Newton and Josh Allen are the only quarterbacks on this list; the rest are running backs.

== Players with at least 75 touchdowns ==
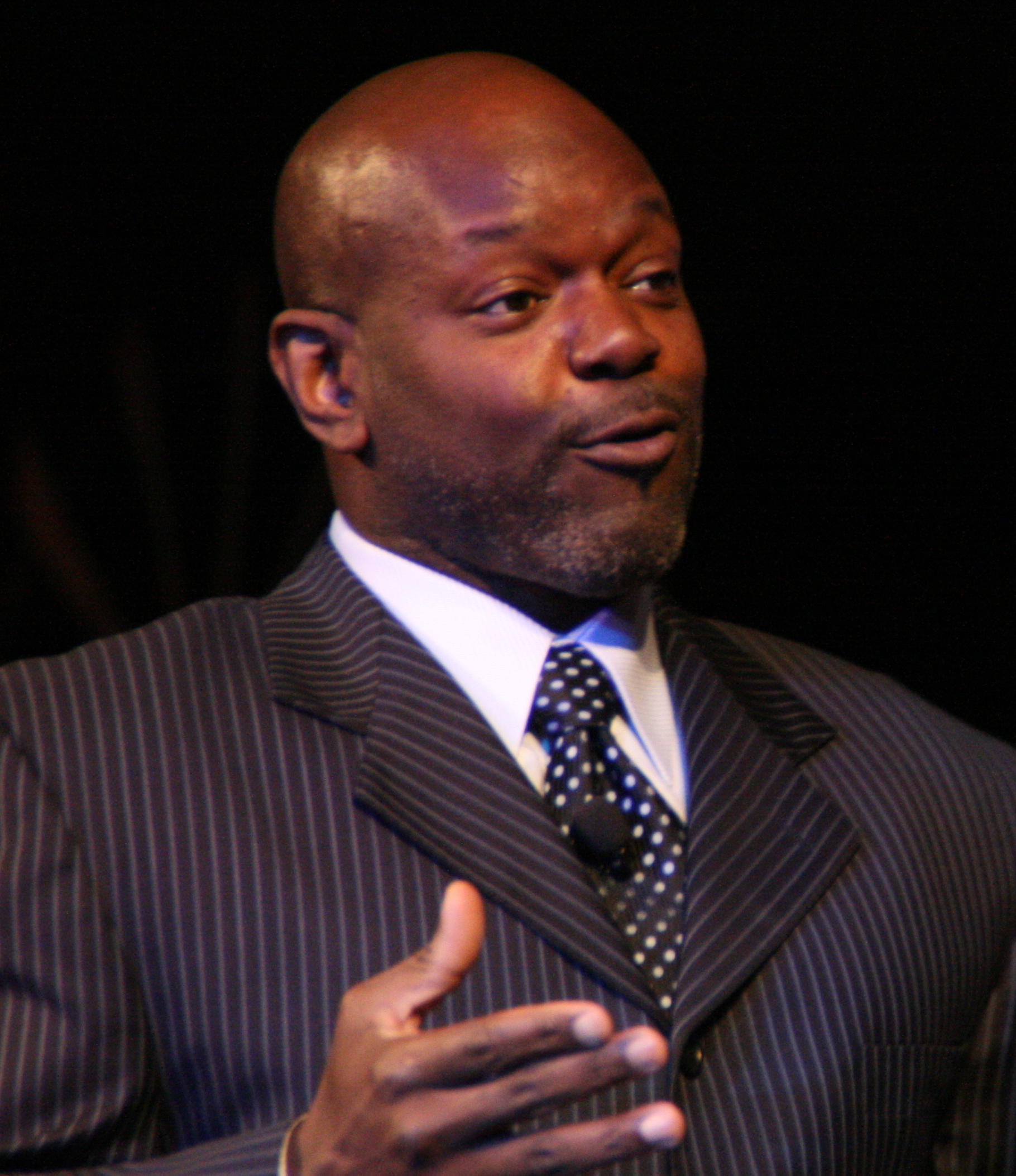
Emmitt Smith has the most rushing touchdowns with 164.

Key
^	Inducted into the Pro Football Hall of Fame
*	Denotes player who is still active

Through Week 10 of the 2026 season

Rank	Player	Team(s) by season	Touchdowns
1	Emmitt Smith^{^}	Dallas Cowboys (1990–2002); Arizona Cardinals (2003–2004)	164
2	LaDainian Tomlinson^{^}	San Diego Chargers (2001–2009); New York Jets (2010–2011)	145
3	Derrick Henry^{*}	Tennessee Titans (2016–2023); Baltimore Ravens (2024–present)	132
4	Marcus Allen^{^}	Los Angeles Raiders (1982–1992); Kansas City Chiefs (1993–1997)	123
5	Adrian Peterson	Minnesota Vikings (2007–2016); New Orleans Saints (2017); Arizona Cardinals (2017); Washington Redskins (2018–2019); Detroit Lions (2020); Tennessee Titans (2021); Seattle Seahawks (2021)	120
6	Walter Payton^{^}	Chicago Bears (1975–1987)	110
7	Jim Brown^{^}	Cleveland Browns (1957–1965)	106
8	John Riggins^{^}	New York Jets (1971–1975); Washington Redskins (1976–1985)	104
9	Shaun Alexander	Seattle Seahawks (2000–2007); Washington Redskins (2008)	100
9	Marshall Faulk^{^}	Indianapolis Colts (1994–1998); St. Louis Rams (1999–2005)	100
11	Barry Sanders^{^}	Detroit Lions (1989–1998)	99
12	Jerome Bettis^{^}	Los Angeles/St. Louis Rams (1993–1995); Pittsburgh Steelers (1996–2005)	91
12	Franco Harris^{^}	Pittsburgh Steelers (1972–1983); Seattle Seahawks (1984)	91
14	Eric Dickerson^{^}	Los Angeles Rams (1983–1987); Indianapolis Colts (1987–1991); Los Angeles Raiders (1992); Atlanta Falcons (1993)	90
14	Curtis Martin^{^}	New England Patriots (1995–1997); New York Jets (1998–2005)	90
14	Josh Allen*	Buffalo Bills (2018–present)	90
17	Priest Holmes	Baltimore Ravens (1997–2000); Kansas City Chiefs (2001–2007)	86
18	Marshawn Lynch	Buffalo Bills (2007–2010); Seattle Seahawks (2010–2015, 2019); Oakland Raiders (2017–2018)	85
19	Jim Taylor^{^}	Green Bay Packers (1958–1966); New Orleans Saints (1967)	83
20	Corey Dillon	Cincinnati Bengals (1997–2003); New England Patriots (2004–2006)	82
21	Ottis Anderson	St. Louis Cardinals (1979–1986); New York Giants (1986–1992)	81
21	Frank Gore	San Francisco 49ers (2005–2014); Indianapolis Colts (2015–2017); Miami Dolphins (2018); Buffalo Bills (2019); New York Jets (2020)	81
23	Edgerrin James^{^}	Indianapolis Colts (1999–2005); Arizona Cardinals (2006–2008); Seattle Seahawks (2009)	80
24	Ricky Watters	San Francisco 49ers (1992–1994); Philadelphia Eagles (1995–1997); Seattle Seahawks (1998–2001)	78
25	Tony Dorsett^{^}	Dallas Cowboys (1977–1987); Denver Broncos (1988)	77
25	Jonathan Taylor*	Indianapolis Colts (2020–present)	77
27	Pete Johnson	Cincinnati Bengals (1976–1983); Miami Dolphins (1984); San Diego Chargers (1984)	76
28	Cam Newton	Carolina Panthers (2011–2019, 2021); New England Patriots (2020)	75
28	Clinton Portis	Denver Broncos (2002–2003); Washington Redskins (2004–2010)	75
28	Josh Jacobs*	Oakland / Las Vegas Raiders (2019–2023); Green Bay Packers (2024–present)	75

== Players with at least 10 postseason rushing touchdowns ==
Through end of 2025 playoffs

Rank	Player	Team(s) by season	Touchdowns
1	Emmitt Smith^{^}	Dallas Cowboys (1990–2002); Arizona Cardinals (2003–2004)	19
2	Franco Harris^{^}	Pittsburgh Steelers (1972–1983); Seattle Seahawks (1984)	16
2	Thurman Thomas^{^}	Buffalo Bills (1988–1999); Miami Dolphins (2000)	16
4	Terrell Davis^{^}	Denver Broncos (1995–2001)	12
4	Marshawn Lynch	Buffalo Bills (2007–2010); Seattle Seahawks (2010–2015, 2019); Oakland Raiders (2017–2018)	12
4	John Riggins^{^}	New York Jets (1971–1975); Washington Redskins (1976–1985)	12
7	Marcus Allen^{^}	Los Angeles Raiders (1982–1992); Kansas City Chiefs (1993–1997)	11
7	LeGarrette Blount	Tampa Bay Buccaneers (2010–2012); New England Patriots (2013, 2014–2016); Pittsburgh Steelers (2014); Philadelphia Eagles (2017); Detroit Lions (2018)	11
9	Jalen Hurts^{*}	Philadelphia Eagles (2020–present)	10

== Historical rushing touchdowns leaders ==
Fifteen players are recognised as having held outright or tied the record as the NFL's career rushing touchdowns leader. Both Jim Brown and Emmitt Smith have held the record for over 20 years.

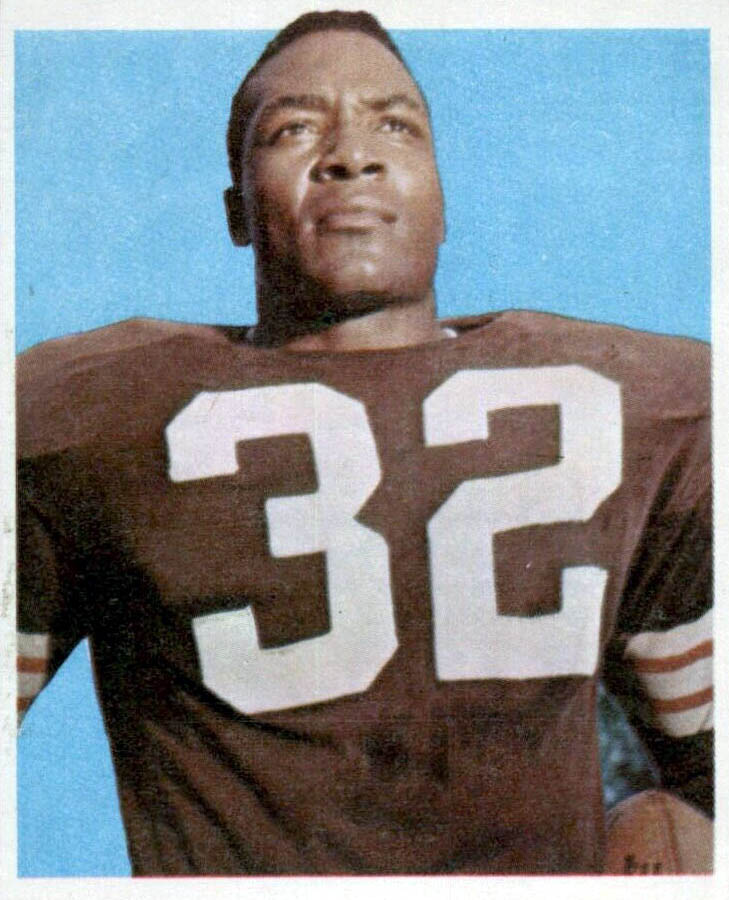
Jim Brown held the record 24 years, from the early 1960s until the Walter Payton era.

Reign	Player	Team(s) while leader	Career rushing touchdowns	Season(s)
1921	Fritz Pollard^{^}	Akron Pros	6	1921
1922	Earl Cramer	Akron Pros	10	1922
1923	Jimmy Conzelman^{^}	Milwaukee Badgers	11	1923
1924	Doc Elliott	Cleveland Bulldogs	14	1924
1925–1926 (2 years)	Tex Hamer	Frankford Yellow Jackets	17	1925
1925–1926 (2 years)	Tex Hamer	Frankford Yellow Jackets	19	1926
Tied 1926	Ben Jones	Frankford Yellow Jackets	19	1926
1927–1929 (3 years)	Paddy Driscoll^{^}	Chicago Bears	22	1927
1927–1929 (3 years)	Paddy Driscoll^{^}	Chicago Bears	24	1928
1927–1929 (3 years)	Paddy Driscoll^{^}	Chicago Bears	25	1929
1930	Verne Lewellen	Green Bay Packers	31	1930
1931–1947 (17 years)	Ernie Nevers^{^}	Chicago Cardinals	38	1931–1947
Tied 1947	Steve Van Buren^{^}	Philadelphia Eagles	38	1947
1948–1960 (14 years)	Steve Van Buren^{^}	Philadelphia Eagles	48	1948
1948–1960 (14 years)	Steve Van Buren^{^}	Philadelphia Eagles	59	1949
1948–1960 (14 years)	Steve Van Buren^{^}	Philadelphia Eagles	63	1950
1948–1960 (14 years)	Steve Van Buren^{^}	Philadelphia Eagles	69	1951–1960
1961–1962 (2 years)	Joe Perry^{^}	Baltimore Colts	71	1961–1962
1963–1987 (24 years)	Jim Brown^{^}	Cleveland Browns	82	1963
1963–1987 (24 years)	Jim Brown^{^}	Cleveland Browns	89	1964
1963–1987 (24 years)	Jim Brown^{^}	Cleveland Browns	106	1965–1986
Tied 1986	Walter Payton^{^}	Chicago Bears	106	1986
1987–1995 (10 years)	Walter Payton^{^}	Chicago Bears	110	1987–1995
1996–1997 (2 years)	Marcus Allen^{^}	Kansas City Chiefs	112	1996
1996–1997 (2 years)	Marcus Allen^{^}	Kansas City Chiefs	123	1997
Since 1998 (29 years)	Emmitt Smith^{^}	Dallas Cowboys (1998–2002); Arizona Cardinals (2003–2004)	125	1998
Since 1998 (29 years)	Emmitt Smith^{^}	Dallas Cowboys (1998–2002); Arizona Cardinals (2003–2004)	136	1999
Since 1998 (29 years)	Emmitt Smith^{^}	Dallas Cowboys (1998–2002); Arizona Cardinals (2003–2004)	145	2000
Since 1998 (29 years)	Emmitt Smith^{^}	Dallas Cowboys (1998–2002); Arizona Cardinals (2003–2004)	148	2001
Since 1998 (29 years)	Emmitt Smith^{^}	Dallas Cowboys (1998–2002); Arizona Cardinals (2003–2004)	153	2002
Since 1998 (29 years)	Emmitt Smith^{^}	Dallas Cowboys (1998–2002); Arizona Cardinals (2003–2004)	155	2003
Since 1998 (29 years)	Emmitt Smith^{^}	Dallas Cowboys (1998–2002); Arizona Cardinals (2003–2004)	164	Since 2004

== See also ==
- NFL records (individual)
- List of National Football League career rushing yards leaders
- List of National Football League annual rushing touchdowns leaders
