= List of NFL career rushing yards leaders =

This is a list of National Football League running backs by total career rushing yards, and includes the 32 running backs who have rushed for at least 10,000 yards, for which sixteen of them have been inducted into the Pro Football Hall of Fame.

Emmitt Smith leads with 18,355 yards and is also the postseason leader with 1,586. He has held the all-time rushing yards record since 2002 and is the only player with over 17,000 regular season rushing yards.

== Players with at least 10,000 rushing yards ==
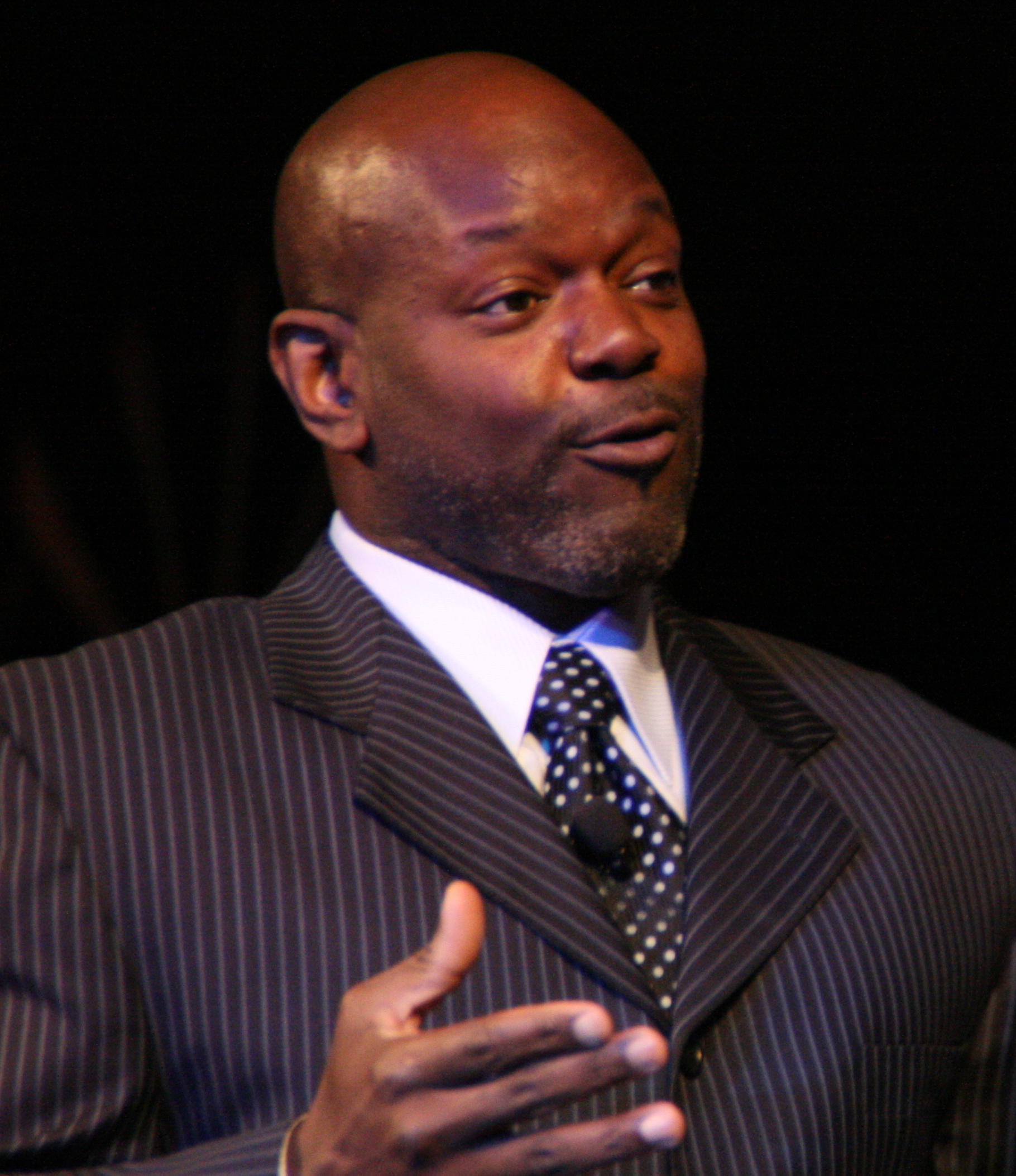
Emmitt Smith has the most rushing yards with 18,355.

Key
^	Inducted into the Pro Football Hall of Fame
*	Denotes player who is still active

Through Week 10 of the 2026 season.

Rank	Player	Team(s) by season	Carries	Yards	Average
1	Emmitt Smith^{^}	Dallas Cowboys (1990–2002); Arizona Cardinals (2003–2004)	4,409	18,355	4.2
2	Walter Payton^{^}	Chicago Bears (1975–1987)	3,838	16,726	4.4
3	Frank Gore	San Francisco 49ers (2005–2014); Indianapolis Colts (2015–2017); Miami Dolphins (2018); Buffalo Bills (2019); New York Jets (2020)	3,735	16,000	4.3
4	Barry Sanders^{^}	Detroit Lions (1989–1998)	3,063	15,269	5.0
5	Adrian Peterson	Minnesota Vikings (2007–2016); New Orleans Saints (2017); Arizona Cardinals (2017); Washington Redskins (2018–2019); Detroit Lions (2020); Tennessee Titans (2021); Seattle Seahawks (2021)	3,230	14,918	4.6
6	Curtis Martin^{^}	New England Patriots (1995–1997); New York Jets (1998–2005)	3,518	14,101	4.0
7	Derrick Henry^{*}	Tennessee Titans (2016–2023); Baltimore Ravens (2024–present)	2,847	13,717	4.8
8	LaDainian Tomlinson^{^}	San Diego Chargers (2001–2009); New York Jets (2010–2011)	3,174	13,684	4.3
9	Jerome Bettis^{^}	Los Angeles/St. Louis Rams (1993–1995 (Note: In 1995, the Los Angeles Rams became known as the St. Louis Rams after the franchise relocated; they returned in 2016.)); Pittsburgh Steelers (1996–2005)	3,479	13,662	3.9
10	Eric Dickerson^{^}	Los Angeles Rams (1983–1987 (Note: Dickerson was traded mid-season in 1987; he played three games for the Rams and nine for the Colts.)); Indianapolis Colts (1987–1991); Los Angeles Raiders (1992); Atlanta Falcons (1993)	2,996	13,259	4.4
11	Tony Dorsett^{^}	Dallas Cowboys (1977–1987); Denver Broncos (1988)	2,936	12,739	4.3
12	Jim Brown^{^}	Cleveland Browns (1957–1965)	2,359	12,312	5.2
13	Marshall Faulk^{^}	Indianapolis Colts (1994–1998); St. Louis Rams (1999–2005)	2,836	12,279	4.3
14	Edgerrin James^{^}	Indianapolis Colts (1999–2005); Arizona Cardinals (2006–2008); Seattle Seahawks (2009)	3,028	12,246	4.0
15	Marcus Allen^{^}	Los Angeles Raiders (1982–1992); Kansas City Chiefs (1993–1997)	3,022	12,243	4.1
16	Franco Harris^{^}	Pittsburgh Steelers (1972–1983); Seattle Seahawks (1984)	2,949	12,120	4.1
17	Thurman Thomas^{^}	Buffalo Bills (1988–1999); Miami Dolphins (2000)	2,877	12,074	4.2
18	Fred Taylor	Jacksonville Jaguars (1998–2008); New England Patriots (2009–2010)	2,534	11,695	4.6
19	Steven Jackson	St. Louis Rams (2004–2012); Atlanta Falcons (2013–2014); New England Patriots (2015)	2,764	11,438	4.1
20	John Riggins^{^}	New York Jets (1971–1975); Washington Redskins (1976–1985)	2,916	11,352	3.9
21	Corey Dillon	Cincinnati Bengals (1997–2003); New England Patriots (2004–2006)	2,618	11,241	4.3
22	O. J. Simpson^{^}	Buffalo Bills (1969–1977); San Francisco 49ers (1978–1979)	2,404	11,236	4.7
23	LeSean McCoy	Philadelphia Eagles (2009–2014); Buffalo Bills (2015–2018); Kansas City Chiefs (2019); Tampa Bay Buccaneers (2020)	2,457	11,102	4.5
24	Warrick Dunn	Tampa Bay Buccaneers (1997–2001, 2008); Atlanta Falcons (2002–2007)	2,284	10,967	4.1
25	Ricky Watters	San Francisco 49ers (1992–1994); Philadelphia Eagles (1995–1997); Seattle Seahawks (1998–2001)	2,622	10,643	4.1
26	Jamal Lewis	Baltimore Ravens (2000–2006); Cleveland Browns (2007–2009)	2,542	10,607	4.2
27	Thomas Jones	Arizona Cardinals (2000–2002); Tampa Bay Buccaneers (2003); Chicago Bears (2004–2006); New York Jets (2007–2009); Kansas City Chiefs (2010–2011)	2,678	10,591	4.0
28	Tiki Barber	New York Giants (1997–2006)	2,217	10,449	4.7
29	Eddie George	Houston/Tennessee Oilers/Titans (1996 (Note: In the 1996 season, George's first, the Tennessee Titans were known as the Houston Oilers; the franchise relocated prior to the commencement of the 1997 season, and were renamed the Titans in 1999.)–2003); Dallas Cowboys (2004)	2,865	10,441	3.6
30	Marshawn Lynch	Buffalo Bills (2007–2010); Seattle Seahawks (2010–2015, 2019); Oakland Raiders (2017–2018)	2,453	10,413	4.2
31	Ottis Anderson	St. Louis Cardinals (1979–1986 (Note: Anderson was traded mid-season in 1986; he played four games for the Cardinals and eight for the Giants.)); New York Giants (1986–1992)	2,562	10,273	4.0
32	Ricky Williams	New Orleans Saints (1999–2001); Miami Dolphins (2002–2003, 2005–2010); Baltimore Ravens (2011)	2,431	10,009	4.1

== Players with at least 1,000 postseason rushing yards ==
Through end of 2025 playoffs

Rank	Player	Team(s) by season	Carries	Yards	Average
1	Emmitt Smith^{^}	Dallas Cowboys (1990–2002); Arizona Cardinals (2003–2004)	349	1,586	4.5
2	Franco Harris^{^}	Pittsburgh Steelers (1972–1983); Seattle Seahawks (1984)	400	1,556	3.9
3	Thurman Thomas^{^}	Buffalo Bills (1988–1999); Miami Dolphins (2000)	339	1,442	4.3
4	Tony Dorsett^{^}	Dallas Cowboys (1977–1987); Denver Broncos (1988)	302	1,383	4.6
5	Marcus Allen^{^}	Los Angeles Raiders (1982–1992); Kansas City Chiefs (1993–1997)	267	1,347	5.0
6	Terrell Davis^{^}	Denver Broncos (1995–2001)	204	1,140	5.6
7	Derrick Henry^{*}	Tennessee Titans (2016–2023); Baltimore Ravens (2024–present)	198	1,002	5.1

== Historical rushing yards leaders ==
Seven players have been recognized as having held the career rushing yards record in the NFL. Since reliable yardage statistics were not recorded prior to 1932, the first NFL player recognized as the career leader in rushing yards was Cliff Battles, who played from 1932 to 1937 for the Boston Braves / Boston Redskins / Washington Redskins. He led the NFL with 576 yards in 1932 and held on to the record throughout his career. Emmitt Smith has held the record since surpassing Walter Payton's long-standing total in 2002.

Reign	Player	Team(s) by season	Carries	Yards	Average
1932–1940 (9 years)	Cliff Battles^{^}	Washington Redskins (1932–1937)	839	3,511	4.2
1941–1949 (9 years)	Clarke Hinkle^{^}	Green Bay Packers (1932–1941)	1,171	3,860	3.3
1949–1957 (9 years)	Steve Van Buren^{^}	Philadelphia Eagles (1944–1951)	1,320	5,860	4.4
1958–1962 (5 years)	Joe Perry^{^}	San Francisco 49ers (1948–1960, 1963); Baltimore Colts (1961–1962)	1,737	8,378	4.8
1963–1983 (21 years)	Jim Brown^{^}	Cleveland Browns (1957–1965)	2,359	12,312	5.2
1984–2001 (18 years)	Walter Payton^{^}	Chicago Bears (1975–1987)	3,838	16,726	4.4
Since 2002 (25 years)	Emmitt Smith^{^}	Dallas Cowboys (1990–2002); Arizona Cardinals (2003–2004)	4,409	18,355	4.2

== See also ==
- List of National Football League records (individual)
- List of National Football League rushing champions
- List of National Football League career rushing touchdowns leaders
- List of National Football League annual rushing touchdowns leaders
