= Carry (gridiron football) =

Play in American football

In gridiron football, a carry or rushing attempt, sometimes known as a touch, is a statistical term equivalent to a single rushing play. The term is typically used in reference to "yards per carry", meaning yards per attempt rushing the ball. Although running backs are typically tasked with carrying the ball, any offensive player who performs a carry is known as a ball-carrier for that play, regardless of position. The yards gained on a carry are referred to as rushing yards. In the National Football League (NFL), Emmitt Smith holds the record for the most career carries, with 4,409. The current leader in yards-per-carry in NFL history with at least 750 carries is former quarterback Michael Vick.

The statistical treatment of yardage lost on sacks differs between the NCAA and NFL. Under NCAA rules, sacks count as rushing yards for both the player and his team. In the NFL, sacks are not counted in the quarterback's passing or rushing yardage, but are counted as part of the team's passing yardage.

== See also ==
- Glossary of American football
- List of National Football League rushing yards leaders
- List of National Football League rushing champions
