= 1994 Arizona Cardinals season =

NFL team season (1st season as Arizona)

- Owner: Bill Bidwill
- Head coach: Buddy Ryan
- Offensive coordinator: Dave Atkins
- Defensive coordinator: Ronnie Jones
- Home stadium: Sun Devil Stadium

Results
- Record: 8–8
- Division place: 3rd NFC East
- Playoffs: Did not qualify
- Pro Bowlers: LB Seth Joyner; FS Aeneas Williams

The 1994 Arizona Cardinals season was the franchise's 75th season with the National Football League (NFL), the seventh season in Arizona and the first season as the "Arizona Cardinals". Buddy Ryan became the 32nd head coach in Cardinals history. After being given a large share of the credit for the success of the Houston Oilers in 1993, Ryan was named head coach of the Arizona Cardinals in 1994. Also named general manager of the Cardinals, Ryan went 8–8 his first year, the Cardinals’ first non-losing season since 1984.

The Cardinals finished the season ranked third in the NFL in total defense, although it allowed only two fewer points in 1994 than they had in 1993. An anemic offense, one which saw three quarterbacks start at least one game, held the team back. Arizona scored 89 points fewer in 1994 than it did in 1993, and it finished with a minus-32-point differential after finishing at plus-57 in 1993.

Arizona lost its first two games by a combined five points, then were shut out 32–0 by the Cleveland Browns. The Cardinals recovered to enter the final week of the season with a shot at the playoffs, but those hopes were ended by a 10–6 loss to the Atlanta Falcons.

== Offseason ==
=== NFL draft ===
1994 Arizona Cardinals draft
Round	Pick	Player	Position	College	Notes
1	10	Jamir Miller *	Linebacker	UCLA	
2	38	Chuck Levy	Running back	Arizona	
3	76	Rich Braham	Center	West Virginia	
3	89	Eric England	Defensive end	Texas A&M	
4	107	Perry Carter	Defensive back	Southern Miss	
4	113	John Reece	Defensive back	Nebraska	
4	115	Terry Irving	Linebacker	McNeese State	
5	139	Anthony Redmon	Guard	Auburn	
6	172	Terry Samuels	Tight end	Kentucky	
7	204	Frank Harvey	Running back	Georgia	
Made roster * Made at least one Pro Bowl during career

== Personnel ==
=== Staff ===
1994 Arizona Cardinals staff
Front office: President – Bill Bidwill; Vice president – Larry Wilson; Assistant general manager – Bob Ackles; Director of college scouting – Bo Bolinger; Head coaches: Head coach/general manager – Buddy Ryan; Offensive coaches: Offensive coordinator – Dave Atkins; Quarterbacks – Matt Cavanaugh; Receivers/tight ends – Ted Plumb; Offensive line – Dan Neal; Offensive line assistant – Guy Morriss; Quality control – George Martinez	Defensive coaches: Defensive coordinator – Ronnie Jones; Defensive line – Rex Ryan; Linebackers – Ted Cottrell; Defensive backs – Rob Ryan; Special teams coaches: Special teams – Al Roberts; Strength and conditioning: Strength and conditioning – Bob Rogucki

=== Roster ===
1994 Arizona Cardinals roster
Quarterbacks (QB): 7 Steve Beuerlein; 9 Jim McMahon; 11 Jay Schroeder; Running backs (RB): 37 Larry Centers FB; 23 Garrison Hearst; 22 Mark Higgs; 4 Chuck Levy; 30 Ronald Moore; Wide receivers (WR): 84 Gary Clark; 81 Randal Hill; 18 Kevin Knox; 87 Ricky Proehl; 80 Bryan Reeves; 82 Patrick Robinson; Tight ends (TE): 86 Chad Fann; 89 Terry Samuels	Offensive linemen (OL): 74 Brian Bollinger G; 62 Ben Coleman T; 59 Ed Cunningham C; 67 Rick Cunningham T; 65 Ernest Dye G; 60 Anthony Redmon G; 68 Joe Wolf T; 71 Mark Tucker G; 69 Mark Vander Poel T; Defensive linemen (DL): 63 Michael Bankston DE; 73 Sebastian Barrie DE; 78 Chad Brown DE; 92 Eric England DE; 91 Wendall Gaines DT; 97 Bryan Hooks DE; 90 Keith McCants DE; 96 Clyde Simmons DE; 98 Eric Swann DT; 94 Bernard Wilson DT	Linebackers (LB): 54 Darryl Hardy; 58 Eric Hill MLB; 56 Terry Irving OLB; 53 Garth Jax MLB; 59 Seth Joyner OLB; 55 Wilber Marshall OLB; 50 David Merritt OLB; 95 Jamir Miller OLB; Defensive backs (DB): 46 Brent Alexander FS; 31 Odie Harris FS; 34 Terry Hoage FS; 29 Lorenzo Lynch SS; 27 Chris Oldham CB; 20 Andre Waters SS; 35 Aeneas Williams CB; 21 James Williams CB; Special teams (ST): 5 Greg Davis K; 10 Jeff Feagles P; 57 Randy Kirk LS	Practice squad: 49 Eric Gant FB; 39 Brian Henesey RB; Reserve: 83 Anthony Edwards WR (IR); 93 Kenny Lopez DE (IR); 67 Luis Sharpe T (IR); -- Willy Tate WR (IR); 48 Sean Wallace S (IR); Rookies in italics 53 active, 5 reserve, 2 practice squad

== Regular season ==
=== Schedule ===
Week	Date	Opponent	Result	Record	Venue	Attendance
1	September 4	at Los Angeles Rams	**L** 12–14	0–1	Anaheim Stadium	32,969
2	September 11	**New York Giants**	**L** 17–20	0–2	Sun Devil Stadium	60,066
3	September 18	at Cleveland Browns	**L** 0–32	0–3	Cleveland Municipal Stadium	62,818
4	Bye					
5	October 2	Minnesota Vikings	**W** 17–7	1–3	Sun Devil Stadium	67,950
6	October 9	at **Dallas Cowboys**	**L** 3–38	1–4	Texas Stadium	64,518
7	October 16	at **Washington Redskins**	**W** 19–16 (OT)	2–4	RFK Stadium	50,019
8	October 23	**Dallas Cowboys**	**L** 21–28	2–5	Sun Devil Stadium	71,023
9	October 30	Pittsburgh Steelers	**W** 20–17 (OT)	3–5	Sun Devil Stadium	65,690
10	November 6	at **Philadelphia Eagles**	**L** 7–17	3–6	Veterans Stadium	64,952
11	November 13	at **New York Giants**	**W** 10–9	4–6	Giants Stadium	71,719
12	November 20	**Philadelphia Eagles**	**W** 12–6	5–6	Sun Devil Stadium	62,779
13	November 27	Chicago Bears	**L** 16–19 (OT)	5–7	Sun Devil Stadium	65,922
14	December 4	at Houston Oilers	**W** 30–12	6–7	Houston Astrodome	39,821
15	December 11	**Washington Redskins**	**W** 17–15	7–7	Sun Devil Stadium	53,790
16	December 18	Cincinnati Bengals	**W** 28–7	8–7	Sun Devil Stadium	50,110
17	December 24	at Atlanta Falcons	**L** 6–10	8–8	Georgia Dome	35,311
Note: Intra-division opponents are in **bold** text.

=== Game summaries ===
==== Week 1 ====
Team	1	2	3	4	Total
Cardinals	0	6	6	0	12
• Rams	7	0	7	0	14

- Date: September 18
- Location: Anaheim Stadium, Anaheim, California
- Game start: 1:00 p.m. PDT
- Game attendance: 32,969
- Game weather: 70 °F (21.1 °C); humidity 77%; wind 8 miles per hour (13 km/h; 7.0 kn)
- Referee: Bernie Kukar
- TV announcers (FOX): Kenny Albert and Ron Pitts

Scoring summary
Q1	2:31	RAM	Todd Lyght 74-yard fumble return (Tony Zendejas kick)	RAM 7–0
Q2	4:33	ARI	Greg Davis 37-yard field goal	RAM 7–3
Q2	11:52	ARI	Greg Davis 34-yard field goal	RAM 7–6
Q2	6:07	RAM	Jerome Bettis 1 yard rush (Tony Zendejas kick)	RAM 14–6
Q4	12:56	ARI	Larry Centers 3-yard pass from Steve Beuerlein (pass failed)	RAM 14–12

==== Week 2 ====
Team	1	2	3	4	Total
• Giants	6	14	0	0	20
Cardinals	3	7	0	7	17

- Date: September 11
- Location: Sun Devil Stadium, Tempe, Arizona
- Game start: 5:00 p.m. MST
- Game attendance: 60,066
- Game weather: 87 °F (30.6 °C); humidity 45%; wind 11 miles per hour (18 km/h; 9.6 kn)
- Referee: Jerry Markbreit
- TV announcers (TNT): Gary Bender, Pat Haden, and Kevin Kiley

Scoring summary
Q1	2:55	NYG	Howard Cross 1 yard pass from Dave Brown	NYG 7–0
Q1	13:02	ARI	Greg Davis 21-yard field goal	NYG 7–3
Q2	0:06	ARI	Fred McAfee 2-yard rush (Greg Davis kick)	ARI 10–7
Q2	6:07	NYG	Rodney Hampton 3-yard rush (David Treadwell kick)	NYG 14–10
Q2	15:01	NYG	Howard Cross 1 yard pass from Dave Brown (David Treadwell kick)	NYG 20–10
Q4	5:02	ARI	Ronald Moore 2-yard pass from Jim McMahon (Greg Davis kick)	NYG 20–17

==== Week 3 ====
Team	1	2	3	4	Total
Cardinals	0	0	0	0	0
• Browns	0	3	15	14	32

- Date: September 18
- Location: Cleveland Municipal Stadium, Cleveland, Ohio
- Game start: 1:00 p.m. EDT
- Game attendance: 62,818
- Game weather: 65 °F (18.3 °C); humidity 62%; wind 11 miles per hour (18 km/h; 9.6 kn)
- Referee: Dale Hamer
- TV announcers (FOX): Kenny Albert and Ron Pitts

Scoring summary
Q2	2:31	CLE	Matt Stover 32-yard field goal	CLE 3–0
Q3	4:33	CLE	Vinny Testaverde 1 yard rush (Matt Stover kick)	CLE 10–0
Q3	11:52	CLE	Tommy Vardell 16-yard pass from Vinny Testaverde (Tom Tupa run)	CLE 18–0
Q4	6:07	CLE	Derrick Alexander 81-yard pass from Vinny Testaverde (Matt Stover kick)	CLE 25–0
Q4	12:56	CLE	Eric Turner 93-yard interception return (Matt Stover kick)	CLE 32–0

==== Week 5 ====
Team	1	2	3	4	Total
Vikings	0	7	0	0	7
• Cardinals	7	0	0	10	17

- Date: October 2
- Location: Sun Devil Stadium, Tempe, Arizona
- Game start: 4:00 p.m. MST
- Game attendance: 67,950
- Game weather: 80 °F (26.7 °C); humidity 26%; wind 7 miles per hour (11 km/h; 6.1 kn)
- Referee: Dick Hantak
- TV announcers (FOX): Thom Brennaman and Anthony Muñoz

Scoring summary
Q1	9:21	ARI	Derek Ware 4-yard pass from Jay Schroeder (Greg Davis kick)	ARI 7–0
Q2	5:15	MIN	Jake Reed 15-yard pass from Warren Moon (Fuad Reveiz kick)	7–7
Q4	2:20	ARI	Greg Davis 46-yard field goal	ARI 10–7
Q4	6:50	ARI	Larry Centers 6-yard rush (Greg Davis kick)	ARI 17–7

==== Week 6 ====
Team	1	2	3	4	Total
Cardinals	0	0	3	0	3
• Cowboys	21	7	10	0	38

- Date: October 9
- Location: Texas Stadium, Irving, Texas
- Game start: 3:00 p.m. CDT
- Game attendance: 64,518
- Game weather: 61 °F (16.1 °C); wind 14 miles per hour (23 km/h; 12 kn)
- Referee: Howard Roe
- TV announcers (FOX): Pat Summerall and John Madden

Scoring summary
Q1	7:35	DAL	Daryl Johnston 2-yard pass from Troy Aikman (Chris Boniol kick)	DAL 7–0
Q1	10:40	DAL	Emmitt Smith 3-yard rush (Chris Boniol kick)	DAL 14–0
Q1	14:18	DAL	Emmitt Smith 1 yard rush (Chris Boniol kick)	DAL 21–0
Q2	6:20	DAL	Michael Irvin 12-yard pass from Troy Aikman (Chris Boniol kick)	DAL 28–0
Q3	6:50	DAL	Chris Boniol 19-yard field goal	DAL 31–0
Q3	8:01	ARI	Greg Davis 42-yard field goal	DAL 31–3
Q3	8:10	DAL	Kevin Williams 87-yard kickoff return (Chris Boniol kick)	DAL 38–3

==== Week 7 ====
Team	1	2	3	4	OT	Total
• Cardinals	0	3	0	13	3	19
Redskins	0	14	0	2	0	16

- Date: October 16
- Location: Robert F. Kennedy Memorial Stadium, Washington, D.C.
- Game start: 1:00 p.m. EST
- Game attendance: 50,019
- Game weather: 57 °F (13.9 °C); wind 8 miles per hour (13 km/h; 7.0 kn)
- Referee: Gary Lane
- TV announcers (FOX): Thom Brennaman and Anthony Muñoz

Scoring summary
Q2	1:43	WAS	Brian Mitchell 46-yard pass from Heath Shuler (Chip Lohmiller kick)	WAS 7–0
Q2	13:27	WAS	Darrell Green 27-yard interception return (Chip Lohmiller kick)	WAS 14–0
Q2	13:42	ARI	Todd Peterson 35-yard field goal	WAS 14–3
Q4	4:58	ARI	Ronald Moore 10-yard rush (run failed)	WAS 14–9
Q4	5:50	WAS	Safety, Jeff Feagles stepped out of end zone	WAS 16–9
Q4	10:00	ARI	Ricky Proehl 5-yard pass from Steve Beuerlein (Todd Peterson kick)	16–16
OT	5:45	ARI	Todd Peterson 29-yard field goal	ARI 19–16

==== Week 8 ====
Team	1	2	3	4	Total
• Cowboys	7	7	0	14	28
Cardinals	0	14	0	7	21

- Date: October 23
- Location: Sun Devil Stadium, Tempe, Arizona
- Game start: 1:00 p.m. MST
- Game attendance: 71,023
- Game weather: 73 °F (22.8 °C); wind 5 miles per hour (8.0 km/h; 4.3 kn)
- Referee: Red Cashion
- TV announcers (FOX): Pat Summerall and John Madden

Scoring summary
Q1	4:30	DAL	Alvin Harper 15-yard pass from Troy Aikman (Chris Boniol kick)	DAL 7–0
Q2	1:00	ARI	Steve Beuerlein 1 yard rush (Todd Peterson kick)	7–7
Q2	12:59	ARI	Ronald Moore 4-yard rush (Todd Peterson kick)	ARI 14–7
Q2	14:02	DAL	Michael Irvin 5-yard pass from Rodney Peete (Chris Boniol kick)	14–14
Q4	3:38	ARI	Ricky Proehl 9-yard pass from Steve Beuerlein (Todd Peterson kick)	ARI 21–14
Q4	5:08	DAL	Michael Irvin 65-yard pass from Rodney Peete (Chris Boniol kick)	21–21
Q4	9:10	DAL	Emmitt Smith 6-yard rush (Chris Boniol kick)	DAL 28–21

==== Week 9 ====
Team	1	2	3	4	OT	Total
Steelers	0	14	0	3	0	17
• Cardinals	7	10	0	0	3	20

- Date: October 30
- Location: Sun Devil Stadium, Tempe, Arizona
- Game start: 6:00 p.m. MST
- Game weather: 73 °F (22.8 °C); wind 4 miles per hour (6.4 km/h; 3.5 kn)
- Referee: Ron Blum
- TV announcers (TNT): Gary Bender, Pat Haden, and Kevin Kiley

Scoring summary
Q1	11:05	ARI	Larry Centers 4-yard rush (Greg Davis kick)	ARI 7–0
Q2	3:02	PIT	Bam Morris 11-yard rush (Gary Anderson kick)	7–7
Q2	11:40	ARI	Greg Davis 20-yard field goal	ARI 10–7
Q2	12:00	PIT	Yancey Thigpen 60-yard pass from Neil O'Donnell (Gary Anderson kick)	PIT 14–10
Q2	14:18	ARI	Ronald Moore 1 yard rush (Greg Davis kick)	ARI 17–14
Q4	14:19	PIT	Gary Anderson 23-yard field goal	17–17
QOT		ARI	Greg Davis 51-yard field goal	ARI 20–17

==== Week 10 ====
Team	1	2	3	4	Total
Cardinals	0	0	0	7	7
• Eagles	0	3	14	0	17

- Date: November 6
- Location: Veterans Stadium, Philadelphia
- Game start: 4:00 p.m. EST
- Game weather: 63 °F (17.2 °C); wind 12 miles per hour (19 km/h; 10 kn)
- Referee: Tom White
- TV announcers (FOX): Dick Stockton and Matt Millen

Scoring summary
Q2	14:47	PHI	Eddie Murray 36-yard field goal	PHI 3–0
Q3	3:35	PHI	Fred Barnett 47-yard pass from Randall Cunningham (Eddie Murray kick)	PHI 10–0
Q3	9:43	PHI	Fred Barnett 50-yard pass from Randall Cunningham (Eddie Murray kick)	PHI 17–0
Q4	14:39	ARI	Ricky Proehl 5-yard pass from Steve Beuerlein (Greg Davis kick)	PHI 17–7

==== Week 11 ====
Team	1	2	3	4	Total
• Cardinals	0	0	3	7	10
Giants	7	2	0	0	9

- Date: November 13
- Location: Giants Stadium, East Rutherford, New Jersey
- Game start: 1:00 p.m.
- Game weather: 52 °F (11.1 °C); wind 12 miles per hour (19 km/h; 10 kn)
- Referee: Bob McElwee
- TV announcers (FOX): Joe Buck and Tim Green

Scoring summary
Q1	NYG	Aaron Pierce 4-yard pass from Kent Graham (David Treadwell kick)	NYG 7–0
Q2	NYG	Holding penalty on Cardinals in end zone	NYG 9–0
Q3	ARI	Greg Davis 45-yard field goal	NYG 9–3
Q4	ARI	Bryan Reeves 9-yard pass from Steve Beuerlein (Greg Davis kick)	ARI 10–9

==== Week 12 ====
Team	1	2	3	4	Total
Eagles	0	3	0	3	6
• Cardinals	3	3	3	3	12

- Date: November 20
- Location: Sun Devil Stadium, Tempe, Arizona
- Game start: 4:00 p.m.
- Game weather: 45 °F (7.2 °C); wind 7 miles per hour (11 km/h; 6.1 kn)
- Referee: Dale Hamer
- TV announcers (FOX): Dick Stockton and Matt Millen

Scoring summary
Q1	ARI	Davis 24-yard field goal	ARI 3–0
Q2	ARI	Davis 24-yard field goal	ARI 6–0
Q2	PHI	Murray 26-yard field goal	ARI 6–3
Q3	ARI	Davis 24-yard field goal	ARI9–3
Q4	PHI	Murray 30-yard field goal	ARI9–6
Q4	ARI	Davis 39-yard field goal	ARI12–6

==== Week 13 ====
Team	1	2	3	4	OT	Total
• Bears	7	3	6	0	3	19
Cardinals	0	3	3	10	0	16

- Date: November 27
- Location: Sun Devil Stadium, Tempe, Arizona
- Game start: 4:00 p.m.
- Game weather: 51 °F (10.6 °C); wind 11 miles per hour (18 km/h; 9.6 kn)
- Referee: Gerald Austin
- TV announcers (FOX): Kevin Harlan and Jerry Glanville

Scoring summary
Q1	CHI	Ryan Wetnight 2-yard pass from Steve Walsh (Kevin Butler kick)	CHI 7–0
Q2	ARI	Greg Davis 49-yard field goal	CHI 7–3
Q2	CHI	Kevin Butler 35-yard field goal	CHI 10–3
Q3	CHI	Kevin Butler 52-yard field goal	CHI 13–3
Q3	ARI	Greg Davis 22-yard field goal	CHI 13–6
Q3	CHI	Kevin Butler 31-yard field goal	CHI 16–6
Q4	ARI	Keith McCants 46-yard interception return (Greg Davis kick)	CHI 16–13
Q4	ARI	Greg Davis 47-yard field goal	16–16
OT	CHI	Kevin Butler 27-yard field goal	CHI 19–16

==== Week 14 ====
Team	1	2	3	4	Total
• Cardinals	0	10	0	20	30
Oilers	9	3	0	0	12

- Date: December 4
- Location: Astrodome, Houston, Texas
- Game start: 3:00 p.m. CST
- Game attendance: 39,821
- Game weather: played indoors, domed stadium
- Referee: Red Cashion
- TV announcers (FOX): Thom Brennaman and Anthony Muñoz

Scoring summary
Q1	9:33	HOU	Safety, Lamar Lathon tackled Jay Schroeder in end zone	HOU 2–0
Q1	11:50	HOU	Cris Dishman 36-yard interception return (Al Del Greco kick)	HOU 9–0
Q2	2:59	ARI	Larry Centers 1 yard rush (Greg Davis kick)	HOU 9–7
Q2	10:45	ARI	Greg Davis 25-yard field goal	ARI 10–9
Q2	13:42	HOU	Al Del Greco 34-yard field goal	HOU 12–10
Q4	2:57	ARI	Gary Clark 13-yard pass from Jay Schroeder (Ronald Moore run)	ARI 18–12
Q4		ARI	Greg Davis 23-yard field goal	ARI 21–12
Q4		ARI	Larry Centers 4-yard rush (Greg Davis kick)	ARI 28–12
Q4		ARI	Safety, Eric Swann tackled Billy Joe Tolliver in end zone	ARI 30–12

This ninth successive defeat for the Oilers has the unusual distinction of being the most recent NFL game as of 2017 during which both teams scored a safety, and one of only eight since at least 1940.

==== Week 15 ====
Team	1	2	3	4	Total
Redskins	3	3	0	9	15
• Cardinals	7	0	0	10	17

- Date: December 11
- Location: Sun Devil Stadium, Tempe, Arizona
- Game start: 2:00 p.m. MST
- Game weather: 52 °F (11.1 °C); wind 4 miles per hour (6.4 km/h; 3.5 kn)
- Referee: Ron Blum
- TV announcers (FOX): Kenny Albert and Ron Pitts

Scoring summary
Q1	ARI	Proehl 48-yard pass from Schroeder (Davis kick)	ARI 7–0
Q1	WSH	Chip Lohmiller 34-yard field goal	ARI 7–3
Q2	WSH	Chip Lohmiller 31-yard field goal	ARI 7–6
Q4	ARI	Moore 1 yard run (Davis kick)	ARI 14–6
Q4	WSH	Ellard 52-yard pass from Shuler (kick failed)	ARI 14–12
Q4	WSH	Lohmiller 21-yard field goal	WSH 15–14
Q4	ARI	Davis 27-yard field goal	ARI 17–15

==== Week 16 ====
Team	1	2	3	4	Total
Bengals	0	0	7	0	7
• Cardinals	14	7	0	7	28

- Date: December 18
- Location: Sun Devil Stadium, Tempe, Arizona
- Game start: 2:00 p.m. MST
- Game weather: 58 °F (14.4 °C); wind 5 miles per hour (8.0 km/h; 4.3 kn)
- Referee: Howard Roe
- TV announcers (NBC): Dan Hicks and Bob Golic

Scoring summary
Q1	3:29	ARI	Garrison Hearst 1 yard rush (Greg Davis kick)	ARI 7–0
Q1	4:59	ARI	Larry Centers 10-yard pass from Garrison Hearst (Greg Davis kick)	ARI 14–0
Q2	0:10	ARI	Ricky Proehl 15-yard pass from Jay Schroeder (Greg Davis kick)	ARI 21–0
Q3	4:23	CIN	Carl Pickens 4-yard pass from Jeff Blake (Doug Pelfrey kick)	ARI 21–7
Q4		ARI	Larry Centers 10-yard rush (Greg Davis kick)	ARI 28–7

==== Week 17 ====
Team	1	2	3	4	Total
Cardinals	0	3	0	3	6
• Falcons	7	0	3	0	10

- Date: December 24
- Location: Georgia Dome, Atlanta
- Game start: 1:00 p.m. EST
- Game attendance: 35,311
- Game weather: played indoors, domed stadium
- Referee: Bernie Kukar
- TV announcers (FOX): Dick Stockton and Matt Millen

Scoring summary
Q1	8:32	ATL	Bert Emanuel 85-yard pass from Jeff George (Norm Johnson kick)	ATL 7–0
Q2	7:51	ARI	Greg Davis 22-yard field goal	ATL 7–3
Q3	13:58	ATL	Norm Johnson 24-yard field goal	ATL 10–3
Q4	6:40	ARI	Greg Davis 49-yard field goal	ATL 10–6

=== Standings ===
NFC East
	W	L	T	PCT	PF	PA	STK
^{(2)} Dallas Cowboys	12	4	0	.750	414	248	L1
New York Giants	9	7	0	.563	279	305	W6
Arizona Cardinals	8	8	0	.500	235	267	L1
Philadelphia Eagles	7	9	0	.438	308	308	L7
Washington Redskins	3	13	0	.188	320	412	W1

== Awards and records ==
- Aeneas Williams, NFL Leader, Interceptions (9)
