= 1995 Arizona Cardinals season =

NFL team season

- Owner: Bill Bidwill
- Head coach: Buddy Ryan
- Offensive coordinator: Dave Atkins
- Defensive coordinator: Ronnie Jones
- Home stadium: Sun Devil Stadium

Results
- Record: 4–12
- Division place: 5th NFC East
- Playoffs: Did not qualify
- Pro Bowlers: FB Larry Centers; DT Eric Swann; CB Aeneas Williams; P Jeff Feagles

The 1995 Arizona Cardinals season was the franchise's 97th season, 76th season in the National Football League (NFL), the eighth in Arizona and the second as the Arizona Cardinals. Former Seattle Seahawks quarterback Dave Krieg started in his only season with the team. The Cardinals failed to improve upon their 8–8 record from 1994 and finished 4–12, resulting in the firing of head coach Buddy Ryan and his entire staff.

== Offseason ==
=== NFL draft ===
1995 Arizona Cardinals draft
Round	Pick	Player	Position	College	Notes
2	47	Frank Sanders	Wide receiver	Auburn	
3	80	Stoney Case	Quarterback	New Mexico	
5	150	Cedric Davis	Defensive back	Tennessee State	
5	165	Lance Scott	Center	Utah	
5	167	Tito Paul	Cornerback	Ohio State	
6	205	Anthony Bridges	Defensive back	North Texas	
7	212	Billy Williams	Wide receiver	Tennessee	
7	224	Wesley Leasy	Linebacker	Mississippi State	
7	241	Chad Eaton	Defensive tackle	Washington State	
Made roster

=== Undrafted free agents ===
1995 undrafted free agents of note
Player	Position	College
Jason Bonds	Quarterback	Northern Arizona
Andy Caflisch	Punter	UW–Stout

== Personnel ==
1995 Arizona Cardinals staff
Front office: President – Bill Bidwill; Vice president – Larry Wilson; Assistant general manager – Joe Woolley; Director of pro scouting – Keith Kidd; Director of college scouting – Bo Bolinger; Head coaches: Head coach/general manager – Buddy Ryan; Offensive coaches: Offensive coordinator – Dave Atkins; Quarterbacks – Matt Cavanaugh; Running backs – George Martinez; Receivers/tight ends – Ted Plumb; Offensive line – Dan Neal	Defensive coaches: Defensive coordinator – Ronnie Jones; Defensive line – Jim Stanley; Linebackers – Rex Ryan; Defensive backs – Rob Ryan; Special teams coaches: Special teams – Al Roberts; Strength and conditioning: Strength and conditioning – Bob Rogucki

== Roster ==
1995 Arizona Cardinals roster
Quarterbacks (QB): 16 Mike Buck; 15 Stoney Case; 17 Dave Krieg; Running backs (RB): 37 Larry Centers FB; 33 Oscar Gray; 23 Garrison Hearst; 32 LeShon Johnson; 31 Ryan Terry; Wide receivers (WR): 82 Stevie Anderson; 84 Marcus Dowdell; 83 Anthony Edwards; 85 Rob Moore; 81 Frank Sanders; Tight ends (TE): 86 Chad Fann; 89 Wendall Gaines; 87 Oscar McBride	Offensive linemen (OL): 79 Ed Cunningham C; 75 Bernard Dafney G; 66 Cecil Gray T; 67 Duval Love G; 61 Brandon Moore T; 60 Anthony Redmon G; 70 Lance Scott C; 74 Rob Selby T; 71 Larry Tharpe T; Defensive linemen (DL): 63 Michael Bankston DE; 78 Chad Brown DE; 76 Jerry Drake DT; 93 Karl Dunbar DT; 92 Eric England DE; 97 Chris Maumalanga DT; 90 Keith McCants DE; 96 Clyde Simmons DE; 98 Eric Swann DT; 94 Bernard Wilson DT	Linebackers (LB): 58 Eric Hill MLB; 56 Terry Irving OLB; 53 Garth Jax OLB; 59 Seth Joyner OLB; 52 Wesley Leasy MLB; 50 David Merritt OLB; Defensive backs (DB): 46 Brent Alexander FS; 25 Carlos Brooks CB; 21 Lance Brown CB; 34 Terry Hoage FS; 26 Tony Jones FS; 29 Lorenzo Lynch SS; 27 Tito Paul CB; 20 Andre Waters SS; 35 Aeneas Williams CB; Special teams (ST): 5 Greg Davis K; 10 Jeff Feagles P; 57 Randy Kirk LS	Practice squad: 26 Walter Dunson RB; Reserve: 21 Cedric Davis CB (IR); 64 Jamie Dukes C (IR); 65 Ernest Dye T (IR); 24 Patrick Hunter CB (IR); 42 Kwamie Lassiter S (IR); 4 Chuck Levy RB (Susp.); 95 Jamir Miller LB (IR); 39 C. J. Richardson S (IR); 51 Simon Shanks LB (IR); 68 Joe Wolf T (IR); Rookies in italics 53 active, 10 reserve, 1 practice squad

== Regular season ==
=== Schedule ===
Week	Date	Opponent	Result	Record	Venue	Attendance
1	September 3	at **Washington Redskins**	**L** 7–27	0–1	RFK Stadium	52,731
2	September 10	**Philadelphia Eagles**	**L** 19–31	0–2	Sun Devil Stadium	45,004
3	September 17	at Detroit Lions	**W** 20–17	1–2	Pontiac Silverdome	58,727
4	September 24	at **Dallas Cowboys**	**L** 20–34	1–3	Texas Stadium	64,560
5	October 1	Kansas City Chiefs	**L** 3–24	1–4	Sun Devil Stadium	50,211
6	October 8	at **New York Giants**	**L** 21–27 (OT)	1–5	Giants Stadium	68,463
7	October 15	**Washington Redskins**	**W** 24–20	2–5	Sun Devil Stadium	42,370
8	Bye					
9	October 29	Seattle Seahawks	**W** 20–14 (OT)	3–5	Sun Devil Stadium	39,600
10	November 5	at Denver Broncos	**L** 6–38	3–6	Mile High Stadium	71,488
11	November 12	Minnesota Vikings	**L** 24–30 (OT)	3–7	Sun Devil Stadium	51,342
12	November 19	at Carolina Panthers	**L** 7–27	3–8	Memorial Stadium	49,582
13	November 26	Atlanta Falcons	**W** 40–37 (OT)	4–8	Sun Devil Stadium	35,147
14	November 30	**New York Giants**	**L** 6–10	4–9	Sun Devil Stadium	44,246
15	December 9	at San Diego Chargers	**L** 25–28	4–10	Jack Murphy Stadium	55,258
16	December 17	at **Philadelphia Eagles**	**L** 20–21	4–11	Veterans Stadium	62,076
17	December 25	**Dallas Cowboys**	**L** 13–37	4–12	Sun Devil Stadium	72,394
Note: Intra-division opponents are in **bold** text.

=== Game summaries ===
==== Week 1: at Washington Redskins ====
Week 1: Arizona Cardinals at Washington Redskins – Game summary

Quarter	1	2	3	4	Total
Cardinals	0	7	0	0	**7**
**Redskins**	10	0	10	7	**27**

at Robert F. Kennedy Memorial Stadium, Washington, District of Columbia

- Date: September 3
- Game time: 4:00 p.m. EST/2:00 p.m. MST
- Game weather: 74 °F (23 °C)
- Game attendance: 52,731
- Box Score

Game information

**First quarter**

- WAS – Eddie Murray 36-yard field goal. Redskins 3–0.
- WAS – Michael Westbrook 58-yard run (Eddie Murray kick). Redskins 10–0.

**Second quarter**

- ARI – Oscar McBride 3-yard pass from Dave Krieg (Greg Davis kick). Redskins 10–7.

**Third quarter**

- WAS – Eddie Murray 22-yard field goal. Redskins 13–7.
- WAS – Leslie Shepherd 73-yard pass from Gus Frerotte (Eddie Murray kick). Redskins 20–7.

**Fourth quarter**

- WAS – Scott Galbraith 2-yard pass from Gus Frerotte (Eddie Murray kick). Redskins 27–7.

**Top passers**

- ARI – Dave Krieg – 10/22, 92 yards, TD, 3 INT
- WAS – Gus Frerotte – 9/15, 157 yards, 2 TD

**Top rushers**

- ARI – Garrison Hearst – 17 rushes, 97 yards
- WAS – Terry Allen – 26 rushes, 131 yards

**Top receivers**

- ARI – Frank Sanders – 1 reception, 36 yards
- WAS – Leslie Shepherd – 1 reception, 73 yards, TD

==== Week 2: vs. Philadelphia Eagles ====
Week 2: Philadelphia Eagles at Arizona Cardinals – Game summary

Quarter	1	2	3	4	Total
**Eagles**	0	10	7	14	**31**
Cardinals	0	3	3	13	**19**

at Sun Devil Stadium, Tempe, Arizona

- Date: September 10
- Game time: 6:00 p.m. MST
- Game weather: 88 °F (31 °C)
- Game attendance: 45,004
- Box Score

Game information

**First quarter**

- No scoring plays

**Second quarter**

- PHI – William Thomas 37-yard interception return (Gary Anderson kick). Eagles 7–0.
- ARI – Greg Davis 21-yard field goal. Eagles 7–3.'
- PHI – Gary Anderson 43-yard field goal. Eagles 10–3.

**Third quarter**

- PHI – Charlie Garner 1-yard run (Gary Anderson kick). Eagles 17–3.
- ARI – Greg Davis 29-yard field goal. Eagles 17–6.

**Fourth quarter**

- PHI – Fred Barnett 19-yard pass from Rodney Peete (Gary Anderson kick). Eagles 24–6.
- ARI – Garrison Hearst 1-yard run (Greg Davis kick). Eagles 24–13.
- PHI – Fred McCrary 1-yard run (Gary Anderson kick). Eagles 31–13.
- ARI – Rob Moore 5-yard pass from Mike Buck (run failed). Eagles 31–20.

**Top passers**

- PHI – Rodney Peete – 8/13, 145 yards, TD
- ARI – Mike Buck – 13/21, 198 yards, TD

**Top rushers**

- PHI – Ricky Watters – 22 rushes, 94 yards
- ARI – Garrison Hearst – 17 rushes, 21 yards

**Top receivers**

- PHI – Fred Barnett – 5 receptions, 97 yards, TD
- ARI – Frank Sanders – 5 receptions, 102 yards

==== Week 3: at Detroit Lions ====
Week 3: Arizona Cardinals at Detroit Lions – Game summary

Quarter	1	2	3	4	Total
**Cardinals**	0	6	0	14	**20**
Lions	3	7	7	0	**17**

at Pontiac Silverdome, Pontiac, Michigan

- Date: September 17
- Game time: 1:00 p.m. EST/11:00 a.m. MST
- Game weather: None (Indoor stadium)
- Game attendance: 58,727
- Box Score

Game information

**First quarter**

- DET – Jason Hanson 21-yard field goal. Lions 3–0.

**Second quarter**

- DET – Brett Perriman 39-yard pass from Scott Mitchell (Jason Hanson kick). Lions 10–0.
- ARI – Greg Davis 55-yard field goal. Lions 10–3.
- ARI – Greg Davis 41-yard field goal. Lions 10–6.

**Third quarter**

- DET – Barry Sanders 47-yard run (Jason Hanson kick). Lions 17–6.

**Fourth quarter**

- ARI – Greg Davis 25-yard field goal. Lions 17–9.
- ARI – Greg Davis 25-yard field goal. Lions 17–12.
- ARI – Anthony Edwards 24-yard pass from Dave Krieg (Dave Krieg–Frank Sanders pass). Cardinals 20–17.

**Top passers**

- ARI – Dave Krieg – 15/24, 158 yards, TD
- DET – Scott Mitchell – 17/26, 217 yards, TD

**Top rushers**

- ARI – Garrison Hearst – 22 rushes, 121 yards
- DET – Barry Sanders – 24 rushes, 147 yards, TD

**Top receivers**

- ARI – Larry Centers – 6 receptions, 37 yards
- DET – Brett Perriman – 7 receptions, 114 yards, TD

==== Week 4: at Dallas Cowboys ====
Week 4: Arizona Cardinals at Dallas Cowboys – Game summary

Quarter	1	2	3	4	Total
Cardinals	0	10	3	7	**20**
**Cowboys**	14	10	3	7	**34**

at Texas Stadium, Irving, Texas

- Date: September 17
- Game time: 3:00 p.m. CST/2:00 p.m. MST
- Game weather: 63 °F (17 °C)
- Game attendance: 64,560
- Box Score

Game information

**First quarter**

- DAL – Jay Novacek 2-yard pass from Troy Aikman (Chris Boniol kick). Cowboys 7–0.
- DAL – Emmitt Smith 6-yard run (Chris Boniol kick). Cowboys 14–0.

**Second quarter**

- ARI – Greg Davis 31-yard field goal. Cowboys 14–3.
- DAL – Emmitt Smith 1-yard run (Chris Boniol kick). Cowboys 21–3.
- ARI – Larry Centers 13-yard pass from Dave Krieg (Greg Davis kick). Cowboys 21–10.
- DAL – Chris Boniol 25-yard field goal. Cowboys 24–10.

**Third quarter**

- DAL – Chris Boniol 30-yard field goal. Cowboys 27–10.
- ARI – Greg Davis 19-yard field goal. Cowboys 27–13.

**Fourth quarter**

- DAL – Sherman Williams 44-yard run (Chris Boniol kick). Cowboys 34–13.
- ARI – Rob Moore 25-yard pass from Dave Krieg (Greg Davis kick). Cowboys 34–20.

**Top passers**

- ARI – Dave Krieg – 24/33, 324 yards, 2 TD, 3 INT
- DAL – Troy Aikman – 19/30, 251 yards, TD

**Top rushers**

- ARI – Larry Centers – 4 rushes, 29 yards
- DAL – Emmitt Smith – 21 rushes, 116 yards, 2 TD

**Top receivers**

- ARI – Rob Moore – 9 receptions, 154 yards, TD
- DAL – Michael Irvin – 5 receptions, 105 yards

==== Week 5: vs. Kansas City Chiefs ====
Week 5: Kansas City Chiefs at Arizona Cardinals – Game summary

Quarter	1	2	3	4	Total
**Chiefs**	0	14	10	0	**24**
Cardinals	0	0	0	3	**3**

at Sun Devil Stadium, Tempe, Arizona

- Date: October 1
- Game time: 2:00 p.m. MST
- Game weather: 77 °F (25 °C)
- Game attendance: 50,211
- Box Score

Game information

**First quarter**

- No scoring plays

**Second quarter**

- KC – Steve Bono 73-yard run (Lin Elliott kick). Chiefs 7–0.
- KC – Joe Valerio 1-yard pass from Steve Bono (Lin Elliott kick). Chiefs 14–0.

**Third quarter**

- KC – Lake Dawson 14-yard pass from Steve Bono (Lin Elliott kick). Chiefs 21–0.
- KC – Lin Elliott 28-yard field goal. Chiefs 28–0.

**Fourth quarter**

- ARI – Greg Davis 48-yard field goal. Chiefs 24–3.'

**Top passers**

- KC – Steve Bono – 7/17, 78 yards, 2 TD, INT
- ARI – Dave Krieg – 25/41, 308 yards, INT

**Top rushers**

- KC – Steve Bono – 5 rushes, 74 yards, TD
- ARI – Garrison Hearst – 15 rushes, 54 yards

**Top receivers**

- KC – Lake Dawson – 2 receptions, 29 yards, TD
- ARI – Frank Sanders – 4 receptions, 97 yards

==== Week 6: at New York Giants ====
Week 6: Arizona Cardinals at New York Giants – Game summary

Quarter	1	2	3	4	OT	Total
Cardinals	3	7	11	0	0	**21**
**Giants**	7	0	7	7	6	**27**

at Giants Stadium, East Rutherford, New Jersey

- Date: October 8
- Game time: 4:00 p.m. EST/2:00 p.m. MST
- Game weather: 64 °F (18 °C)
- Game attendance: 68,463
- Box Score

Game information

**First quarter**

- ARI – Greg Davis 31-yard field goal. Cardinals 3–0.
- NYG – Mike Sherrard 6-yard pass from Dave Brown (Brad Daluiso kick). Giants 7–3.

**Second quarter**

- ARI – Frank Sanders 11-yard pass from Dave Krieg (Greg Davis kick). Cardinals 10–7.

**Third quarter**

- ARI – Greg Davis 36-yard field goal. Cardinals 13–7.
- NYG – Charles Way 2-yard pass from Dave Brown (Brad Daluiso kick). Giants 14–13.
- ARI – Frank Sanders 6-yard pass from Dave Krieg (Dave Krieg–Frank Sanders pass). Cardinals 21–14.

**Fourth quarter**

- NYG – Dave Brown 2-yard run (Brad Daluiso kick). Tied 21–21.

**Overtime**

- NYG – Jessie Armstead 58-yard inteception return. Giants 27–21.

**Top passers**

- ARI – Dave Krieg – 23/38, 305 yards, 2 TD, INT
- NYG – Dave Brown – 14/23, 166 yards, 2 TD, 2 INT

**Top rushers**

- ARI – Garrison Hearst – 23 rushes, 122 yards
- NYG – Tyrone Wheatley – 18 rushes, 61 yards

**Top receivers**

- ARI – Frank Sanders – 6 receptions, 108 yards, 2 TD
- NYG – Mike Sherrard – 4 receptions, 32 yards, TD

==== Week 7: vs. Washington Redskins ====
Week 7: Washington Redskins at Arizona Cardinals – Game summary

Quarter	1	2	3	4	Total
Redskins	7	6	7	0	**20**
**Cardinals**	3	7	7	7	**24**

at Sun Devil Stadium, Tempe, Arizona

- Date: October 15
- Game time: 2:00 p.m. MST
- Game weather: 84 °F (29 °C)
- Game attendance: 42,370
- Box Score

Game information

**First quarter**

- WAS – Henry Ellard 46-yard pass from Gus Frerotte (Eddie Murray kick). Redskins 7–0.
- ARI – Greg Davis 24-yard field goal. Redskins 7–3.'

**Second quarter**

- ARI – Aeneas Williams 28-yard interception return (Greg Davis kick). Cardinals 10–7.
- WAS – Eddie Murray 38-yard field goal. Tied 10–10.
- WAS – Eddie Murray 25-yard field goal. Redskins 13–10.

**Third quarter**

- ARI – Larry Centers 9-yard run (Greg Davis kick). Cardinals 17–13.
- WAS – Coleman Bell 29-yard pass from Gus Frerotte (Eddie Murray kick). Redskins 20–17.

**Fourth quarter**

- ARI – Garrison Hearst 1-yard pass from Dave Krieg (Greg Davis kick). Cardinals 24–20.

**Top passers**

- WAS – Gus Frerotte – 15/29, 242 yards, 2 TD, INT
- ARI – Dave Krieg – 22/33, 207 yards, TD, INT

**Top rushers**

- WAS – Terry Allen – 17 rushes, 42 yards
- ARI – Garrison Hearst – 24 rushes, 79 yards

**Top receivers**

- WAS – Henry Ellard – 2 receptions, 64 yards, TD
- ARI – Larry Centers – 7 receptions, 52 yards

==== Week 9: vs. Seattle Seahawks ====
Week 9: Seattle Seahawks at Arizona Cardinals – Game summary

Quarter	1	2	3	4	OT	Total
Seahawks	0	0	7	7	0	**14**
**Cardinals**	14	0	0	0	6	**20**

at Sun Devil Stadium, Tempe, Arizona

- Date: October 29
- Game time: 2:00 p.m. MST
- Game weather: 72 °F (22 °C)
- Game attendance: 39,600
- Box Score

Game information

**First quarter**

- ARI – Rob Moore 8-yard pass from Dave Krieg (Greg Davis kick). Cardinals 7–0.
- ARI – Keith McCants 5-yard fumble return (Greg Davis kick). Cardinals 14–0.

**Second quarter**

- No scoring plays

**Third quarter**

- SEA – Mack Strong 17-yard pass from John Friesz (Todd Peterson kick). Cardinals 14–7.

**Fourth quarter**

- SEA – Mack Strong 2-yard pass from John Friesz (Todd Peterson kick). Tied 14–14.

**Overtime**

- ARI – Lorenzo Lynch 72-yard interception return. Cardinals 20–14.

**Top passers**

- SEA – John Friesz – 17/32, 205 yards, 2 TD, 2 INT
- ARI – Dave Krieg – 23/45, 200 yards, TD, 2 INT

**Top rushers**

- SEA – Chris Warren – 23 rushes, 127 yards
- ARI – Garrison Hearst – 21 rushes, 54 yards

**Top receivers**

- SEA – Brian Blades – 5 receptions, 69 yards
- ARI – Rob Moore – 6 receptions, 77 yards, TD

==== Week 10: at Denver Broncos ====
Week 10: Arizona Cardinals at Denver Broncos – Game summary

Quarter	1	2	3	4	Total
Cardinals	3	3	0	0	**6**
**Broncos**	14	10	7	7	**38**

at Mile High Stadium, Denver, Colorado

- Date: November 5
- Game time: 2:00 p.m. MST
- Game weather: 44 °F (7 °C)
- Game attendance: 71,488
- Box Score

Game information

**First quarter**

- DEN – Terrell Davis 5-yard run (Jason Elam kick). Broncos 7–0.
- DEN – Aaron Craver 1-yard run (Jason Elam kick). Broncos 14–0.
- ARI – Greg Davis 31-yard field goal. Broncos 14–3.

**Second quarter**

- DEN – Aaron Craver 1-yard pass from John Elway (Jason Elam kick). Broncos 21–3.
- DEN – Jason Elam 53-yard field goal. Broncos 24–3.
- ARI – Greg Davis 20-yard field goal. Broncos 24–6.

**Third quarter**

- DEN – Anthony Miller 47-yard pass from John Elway (Jason Elam kick). Broncos 31–6.

**Fourth quarter**

- DEN – Ed McCaffrey 23-yard pass from John Elway (Jason Elam kick). Broncos 38–6.

**Top passers**

- ARI – Dave Krieg – 17/29, 233 yards
- DEN – John Elway – 16/21, 256 yards, 3 TD

**Top rushers**

- ARI – Garrison Hearst – 12 rushes, 50 yards
- DEN – Terrell Davis – 22 rushes, 135 yards, TD

**Top receivers**

- ARI – Rob Moore – 6 receptions, 84 yards
- DEN – Anthony Miller – 2 receptions, 61 yards, TD

==== Week 11: vs. Minnesota Vikings ====
Week 11: Minnesota Vikings at Arizona Cardinals – Game summary

Quarter	1	2	3	4	OT	Total
**Vikings**	3	14	0	7	6	**30**
Cardinals	0	10	6	8	0	**24**

at Sun Devil Stadium, Tempe, Arizona

- Date: November 12
- Game time: 2:00 p.m. MST
- Game weather: 66 °F (19 °C)
- Game attendance: 51,342
- Box Score

Game information

**First quarter**

- MIN – Fuad Reveiz 43-yard field goal. Vikings 3–0.

**Second quarter**

- MIN – Jake Reed 32-yard pass from Warren Moon (Fuad Reveiz kick). Vikings 10–0.
- ARI – Rob Moore 9-yard pass from Dave Krieg (Greg Davis kick). Vikings 10–7.
- MIN – Cris Carter 5-yard pass from Warren Moon (Fuad Reveiz kick). Vikings 17–7.
- ARI – Greg Davis 39-yard field goal. Vikings 17–10.

**Third quarter**

- ARI – Greg Davis 44-yard field goal. Vikings 17–13.
- ARI – Greg Davis 44-yard field goal. Vikings 17–16.

**Fourth quarter**

- MIN – Cris Carter 2-yard pass from Warren Moon (Fuad Reveiz kick). Vikings 24–16.
- ARI – Wendall Gaines 2-yard pass from Dave Krieg (Dave Krieg–Rob Moore pass). Tied 24–24.

**Overtime**

- MIN – Qadry Ismail 50-yard pass from Warren Moon. Vikings 30–24.

**Top passers**

- MIN – Warren Moon – 24/43, 342 yards, 4 TD
- ARI – Dave Krieg – 19/36, 231 yards, 2 TD, INT

**Top rushers**

- MIN – Robert Smith – 15 rushes, 62 yards
- ARI – Garrison Hearst – 18 rushes, 103 yards

**Top receivers**

- MIN – Cris Carter – 12 receptions, 157 yards, 2 TD
- ARI – Frank Sanders – 3 receptions, 70 yards

==== Week 12: at Carolina Panthers ====
Week 12: Arizona Cardinals at Carolina Panthers – Game summary

Quarter	1	2	3	4	Total
Cardinals	0	7	0	0	**7**
**Panthers**	0	14	6	7	**27**

at Memorial Stadium, Clemson, South Carolina

- Date: November 19
- Game time: 1:00 p.m. EST/11:00 a.m. MST
- Game weather: 55 °F (13 °C)
- Game attendance: 49,582
- Box Score

Game information

**First quarter**

- No scoring plays

**Second quarter**

- CAR – Pete Metzelaars 7-yard pass from Kerry Collins (John Kasay kick). Panthers 7–0.
- CAR – Bob Christian 2-yard pass from Kerry Collins (John Kasay kick). Panthers 14–0.
- ARI – Aeneas Williams 72-yard blocked field goal return (Greg Davis kick). Panthers 14–7.

**Third quarter**

- CAR – John Kasay 42-yard field goal. Panthers 17–7.
- CAR – John Kasay 30-yard field goal. Panthers 20–7.

**Fourth quarter**

- CAR – Anthony Johnson 23-yard run (John Kasay kick). Panthers 27–7.

**Top passers**

- ARI – Dave Krieg – 14/25, 106 yards
- CAR – Kerry Collins – 15/23, 201 yards, 2 TD

**Top rushers**

- ARI – Garrison Hearst – 9 rushes, 32 yards
- CAR – Howard Griffith – 25 rushes, 88 yards

**Top receivers**

- ARI – Frank Sanders – 3 receptions, 37 yards
- CAR – Mark Carrier – 5 receptions, 90 yards

==== Week 13: vs. Atlanta Falcons ====
Week 13: Atlanta Falcons at Arizona Cardinals – Game summary

Quarter	1	2	3	4	OT	Total
Falcons	0	20	7	10	0	**37**
**Cardinals**	6	14	7	10	3	**40**

at Sun Devil Stadium, Tempe, Arizona

- Date: November 26
- Game time: 2:00 p.m. MST
- Game weather: 67 °F (19 °C)
- Game attendance: 35,147
- Box Score

Game information

**First quarter**

- ARI – Greg Davis 44-yard field goal. Cardinals 3–0.
- ARI – Greg Davis 29-yard field goal. Cardinals 6–0.

**Second quarter**

- ATL – Eric Metcalf 5-yard pass from Jeff George (kick failed). Tied 6–6.
- ATL – Jessie Tuggle 27-yard interception return (Morten Andersen kick). Falcons 13–6.
- ATL – Roell Preston 61-yard pass from Jeff George (Morten Andersen kick). Falcons 20–6.
- ARI – Rob Moore 18-yard pass from Dave Krieg (Greg Davis kick). Falcons 20–13.
- ARI – Anthony Edwards 28-yard pass from Dave Krieg (Greg Davis kick). Tied 20–20.

**Third quarter**

- ATL – Terance Mathis 54-yard pass from Jeff George (Morten Andersen kick). Falcons 27–20.
- ARI – Wendall Gaines 22-yard pass from Dave Krieg (Greg Davis kick). Tied 27–27.

**Fourth quarter**

- ARI – Greg Davis 23-yard field goal. Cardinals 30–27.
- ATL – Jamal Anderson 3-yard run (Morten Andersen kick). Falcons 34–30.
- ATL – Morten Andersen 21-yard field goal. Falcons 37–30.
- ARI – Oscar McBride 2-yard pass from Dave Krieg (Greg Davis kick). Tied 37–37.

**Overtime**

- ARI – Greg Davis 28-yard field goal. Cardinals 40–37.

**Top passers**

- ATL – Jeff George – 15/34, 280 yards, 3 TD, INT
- ARI – Dave Krieg – 27/43, 413 yards, 4 TD, 2 INT

**Top rushers**

- ATL – Craig Heyward – 9 rushes, 33 yards
- ARI – Larry Centers – 13 rushes, 62 yards

**Top receivers**

- ATL – Roell Preston – 3 receptions, 79 yards, TD
- ARI – Rob Moore – 8 receptions, 121 yards, TD

==== Week 14: vs. New York Giants ====
Week 14: New York Giants at Arizona Cardinals – Game summary

Quarter	1	2	3	4	Total
**Giants**	0	3	7	0	**10**
Cardinals	0	6	0	0	**6**

at Sun Devil Stadium, Tempe, Arizona

- Date: November 30
- Game time: 6:00 p.m. MST
- Game weather: 60 °F (16 °C)
- Game attendance: 44,246
- Box Score

Game information

**First quarter**

- No scoring plays

**Second quarter**

- ARI – Greg Davis 44-yard field goal. Cardinals 3–0.
- ARI – Greg Davis 28-yard field goal. Cardinals 6–0.'
- NYG – Brad Daluiso 51-yard field goal. Cardinals 6–3.

**Third quarter**

- NYG – Mike Sherrard 12-yard pass from Dave Brown (Brad Daluiso kick). Giants 10–6.

**Fourth quarter**

- No scoring plays

**Top passers**

- NYG – Dave Brown – 17/27, 144 yards, TD
- ARI – Dave Krieg – 22/37, 235 yards, INT

**Top rushers**

- NYG – Rodney Hampton – 18 rushes, 43 yards
- ARI – Garrison Hearst – 21 rushes, 85 yards

**Top receivers**

- NYG – Chris Calloway – 7 receptions, 71 yards
- ARI – Frank Sanders – 6 receptions, 84 yards

==== Week 15: at San Diego Chargers ====
Week 15: Arizona Cardinals at San Diego Chargers – Game summary

Quarter	1	2	3	4	Total
Cardinals	0	14	3	8	**25**
**Chargers**	0	14	14	0	**28**

at Jack Murphy Stadium, San Diego, California

- Date: December 9
- Game time: 1:00 p.m. PST/2:00 p.m. MST
- Game weather: 60 °F (16 °C)
- Game attendance: 55,258
- Box Score

Game information

**First quarter**

- No scoring plays

**Second quarter**

- SD – Mark Seay 15-yard pass from Stan Humphries (John Carney kick). Chargers 7–0.
- ARI – Larry Centers 22-yard pass from Dave Krieg (Greg Davis kick). Tied 7–7.
- ARI – Clyde Simmons 25-yard interception return (Greg Davis kick). Cardinals 14–7.
- SD – Ronnie Harmon 3-yard pass from Stan Humphries (John Carney kick). Tied 14–14.

**Third quarter**

- SD – Andre Coleman 92-yard kickoff return (John Carney kick). Chargers 21–14.
- SD – Mark Seay 38-yard pass from Stan Humphries (John Carney kick). Chargers 28–14.
- ARI – Greg Davis 36-yard field goal. Chargers 28–17.

**Fourth quarter**

- ARI – Stevie Anderson 12-yard pass from Dave Krieg (Dave Krieg–Stevie Anderson pass). Chargers 28–25.

**Top passers**

- ARI – Dave Krieg – 24/40, 283 yards, 2 TD
- SD – Stan Humphries – 26/41, 288 yards, 3 TD, 4 INT

**Top rushers**

- ARI – Garrison Hearst – 11 rushes, 18 yards
- SD – Aaron Hayden – 24 rushes, 84 yards

**Top receivers**

- ARI – Rob Moore – 5 receptions, 104 yards
- SD – Mark Seay – 7 receptions, 114 yards, 2 TD

==== Week 16: at Philadelphia Eagles ====
Week 16: Arizona Cardinals at Philadelphia Eagles – Game summary

Quarter	1	2	3	4	Total
Cardinals	0	14	3	8	**25**
**Eagles**	0	14	14	0	**28**

at Veterans Stadium, Philadelphia, Pennsylvania

- Date: December 17
- Game time: 1:00 p.m. EST/11:00 a.m. MST
- Game weather: 36 °F (2 °C)
- Game attendance: 62,076
- Box Score

Game information

**First quarter**

- ARI – Greg Davis 37-yard field goal. Cardinals 3–0.
- ARI – Greg Davis 35-yard field goal. Cardinals 6–0.

**Second quarter**

- ARI – Larry Centers 1-yard run (Greg Davis kick). Cardinals 13–0.
- ARI – Greg Davis 37-yard field goal. Cardinals 17–0.
- PHI – Derrick Witherspoon 86-yard kickoff return (Gary Anderson kick). Cardinals 17–7.

**Third quarter**

- PHI – Reggie Johnson 21-yard pass from Rodney Peete (Gary Anderson kick). Cardinals 17–14.
- ARI – Greg Davis 35-yard field goal. Cardinals 20–14.

**Fourth quarter**

- PHI – Calvin Williams 37-yard pass from Rodney Peete (Gary Anderson kick). Eagles 21–20.

**Top passers**

- ARI – Dave Krieg – 21/38, 253 yards, 2 INT
- PHI – Rodney Peete – 14/31, 213 yards, 2 TD, 3 INT

**Top rushers**

- ARI – Garrison Hearst – 26 rushes, 95 yards
- PHI – Ricky Watters – 23 rushes, 74 yards

**Top receivers**

- ARI – Frank Sanders – 7 receptions, 70 yards
- PHI – Calvin Williams – 7 receptions, 105 yards, TD

==== Week 17: vs. Dallas Cowboys ====
Week 17: Dallas Cowboys at Arizona Cardinals – Game summary

Quarter	1	2	3	4	Total
**Cowboys**	17	7	3	10	**37**
Cardinals	0	3	10	0	**13**

at Sun Devil Stadium, Tempe, Arizona

- Date: December 25
- Game time: 7:00 p.m. MST
- Game weather: 56 °F (13 °C)
- Game attendance: 72,394
- Box Score

Game information

**First quarter**

- DAL – Kevin Williams 25-yard pass from Troy Aikman (Chris Boniol kick). Cowboys 7–0.
- DAL – Brock Marion 32-yard interception return. Cowboys 14–0.
- DAL – Chris Boniol 39-yard field goal. Cowboys 17–0.'

**Second quarter**

- DAL – Kevin Williams 48-yard pass from Troy Aikman (Chris Boniol kick). Cowboys 24–0.
- ARI – Greg Davis 21-yard field goal. Cowboys 24–3.

**Third quarter**

- ARI – Aeneas Williams 48-yard interception return. Cowboys 24–10.
- ARI – Greg Davis 23-yard field goal. Cowboys 24–13.'
- DAL – Chris Boniol 23-yard field goal. Cowboys 27–13.'

**Fourth quarter**

- DAL – Emmitt Smith 3-yard run (Greg Davis kick). Cowboys 34–13.
- DAL – Chris Boniol 24-yard field goal. Cowboys 37–13.'

**Top passers**

- DAL – Troy Aikman – 21/32, 350 yards, 2 TD, INT
- ARI – Dave Krieg – 12/28, 152 yards, 2 INT

**Top rushers**

- DAL – Emmitt Smith – 24 rushes, 68 yards, TD
- ARI – Garrison Hearst – 14 rushes, 57 yards

**Top receivers**

- DAL – Kevin Williams – 9 receptions, 203 yards, 2 TD
- ARI – Larry Centers – 12 receptions, 172 yards

=== Standings ===
NFC East
	W	L	T	PCT	PF	PA	STK
^{(1)} Dallas Cowboys	12	4	0	.750	435	291	W2
^{(4)} Philadelphia Eagles	10	6	0	.625	318	338	L1
Washington Redskins	6	10	0	.375	326	359	W2
New York Giants	5	11	0	.313	290	340	L2
Arizona Cardinals	4	12	0	.250	275	422	L4

== Awards and records ==
- Larry Centers, Franchise Record (since broken), Most Receptions in One Season, 101
- Greg Davis, Franchise Record, Most Field Goals in One Season, 30
- Garrison Hearst, NFL Comeback Player of the Year

=== Milestones ===
- Larry Centers, 1st 100 Reception Season

== Pop culture ==
The season was featured in the 1996 film Jerry Maguire. Portions of the film centered on fictional wide receiver Rod Tidwell, played by Cuba Gooding Jr., and his agent Jerry Maguire, played by Tom Cruise.
