= 1993 Phoenix Cardinals season =

NFL team season (last season as Phoenix)

- Owner: Bill Bidwill
- General manager: Larry Wilson
- Head coach: Joe Bugel
- Offensive coordinator: Jerry Rhome
- Defensive coordinator: Fritz Shurmur
- Home stadium: Sun Devil Stadium

Results
- Record: 7–9
- Division place: 4th NFC East
- Playoffs: Did not qualify
- Pro Bowlers: P Rich Camarillo

The 1993 season was the Phoenix Cardinals' 74th in the National Football League (NFL), their 95th overall, their sixth in Arizona, and their last as the Phoenix Cardinals (becoming the Arizona Cardinals the following season). The team improved upon their 4–12 record from the previous season, winning seven games. Despite the improvement, the Cardinals failed to qualify to the playoffs for the 11th straight season. It was not enough for head coach Joe Bugel to keep his job; he was fired 23 days after the season finale.

The Cardinals outscored their opponents by 57 points (326–269), the last time they would finish with a positive scoring margin until 2007. The only season since 1994 in which Arizona had a better point differential than 1993 was in 2015, when it went 13–3 and compiled a franchise record +176 margin.

== Offseason ==
=== NFL draft ===
1993 Phoenix Cardinals draft
Round	Pick	Player	Position	College	Notes
1	3	Garrison Hearst *	Running back	Georgia	
1	18	Ernest Dye	Offensive tackle	South Carolina	
2	32	Ben Coleman	Guard	Wake Forest	
4	87	Ronald Moore	Running back	Pittsburg State	
6	143	Brett Wallerstedt	Linebacker	Arizona State	
7	172	Will White	Defensive back	Florida	
8	199	Chad Brown	Defensive end	Mississippi	
8	215	Stevie Anderson	Wide receiver	Grambling State	
Made roster * Made at least one Pro Bowl during career

== Personnel ==
=== Staff ===
1993 Phoenix Cardinals staff
Front office: President – Bill Bidwill; Vice president and general manager – Larry Wilson; Director of pro personnel – Erik Widmark; Director of college scouting – Bob Ackles; Head coaches: Head coach – Joe Bugel; Offensive coaches: Offensive coordinator – Jerry Rhome; Running backs – Bobby Jackson; Receivers – LeCharls McDaniel; Tight ends – Ted Plumb; Offensive line – John Matsko	Defensive coaches: Defensive coordinator – Fritz Shurmur; Defensive line – Ted Cottrell; Inside linebackers/quality control – Mike Murphy; Outside linebackers – Joe Pascale; Defensive secondary – Jim Johnson; Special teams coaches: Special teams – Pete Rodriguez; Strength and conditioning: Strength and conditioning – Bob Rogucki

== Roster ==
1993 Phoenix Cardinals roster
Quarterbacks (QB): 7 Steve Beuerlein; 17 Chris Chandler; 2 Will Furrer; 19 Tony Sacca; Running backs (RB): 20 Johnny Bailey; 25 Eric Blount; 37 Larry Centers; 30 Ronald Moore; Wide receivers (WR): 83 Anthony Edwards; 84 Gary Clark; 81 Randal Hill; 87 Ricky Proehl; Tight ends (TE): 80 Chad Fann; 86 Walter Reeves; 82 Butch Rolle; 85 Derek Ware	Offensive linemen (OL): 62 Ben Coleman G; 59 Ed Cunningham C; 67 Rick Cunningham T; 65 Ernest Dye T; 73 Mark May G; 67 Luis Sharpe T; 61 Lance Smith G; 71 Mark Tucker C; 68 Joe Wolf T; Defensive linemen (DL): 63 Michael Bankston DE; 78 Chad Brown DE; 93 Reuben Davis DE/DT; 72 Chuckie Johnson DT; 75 Mike Jones DE; 50 Freddie Joe Nunn DE; 79 Keith Rucker DT	Linebackers (LB): 54 David Braxton OLB; 56 Ken Harvey OLB; 58 Eric Hill MLB; 97 Steve Hyche OLB; 53 Garth Jax MLB; 55 Jock Jones OLB; 94 David Merritt OLB; 90 Tyronne Stowe OLB; Defensive backs (DB): 42 John Booty SS; 26 Chuck Cecil FS; 22 Dave Duerson SS; 31 Odie Harris FS; 28 Steve Lofton CB; 29 Lorenzo Lynch CB; 40 Robert Massey CB; 26 Chris Oldham SS; 35 Aeneas Williams CB; 38 Mike Zordich FS; Special teams (ST): 89 Pat Beach LS; 16 Rich Camarillo P; 5 Greg Davis K	Practice squad: 11 Mike Cook WR; 41 Robert Jackson WR; 33 Lance Lewis RB; 74 Mike Moody T; 66 Chris Perez T; Reserve: 70 Rob Baxley T (IR); 23 Garrison Hearst RB (IR); 98 Eric Swann DT (IR); 52 Brett Wallerstedt MLB (IR); Rookies in italics 53 active, 4 reserve, 5 practice squad

== Regular season ==
=== Schedule ===
Week	Date	Opponent	Result	Record	Venue	Attendance	Recap
1	September 5	at **Philadelphia Eagles**	**L** 17–23	0–1	Veterans Stadium	59,831	Recap
2	September 12	at **Washington Redskins**	**W** 17–10	1–1	RFK Stadium	53,525	Recap
3	September 19	**Dallas Cowboys**	**L** 10–17	1–2	Sun Devil Stadium	73,025	Recap
4	September 26	at Detroit Lions	**L** 20–26	1–3	Pontiac Silverdome	57,180	Recap
5	Bye						
6	October 10	New England Patriots	**L** 21–23	1–4	Sun Devil Stadium	36,115	Recap
7	October 17	**Washington Redskins**	**W** 36–6	2–4	Sun Devil Stadium	48,143	Recap
8	October 24	at San Francisco 49ers	**L** 14–28	2–5	Candlestick Park	62,020	Recap
9	October 31	New Orleans Saints	**L** 17–20	2–6	Sun Devil Stadium	36,778	Recap
10	November 7	**Philadelphia Eagles**	**W** 16–3	3–6	Sun Devil Stadium	41,634	Recap
11	November 14	at **Dallas Cowboys**	**L** 15–20	3–7	Texas Stadium	64,224	Recap
12	Bye						
13	November 28	at **New York Giants**	**L** 17–19	3–8	Giants Stadium	59,979	Recap
14	December 5	Los Angeles Rams	**W** 38–10	4–8	Sun Devil Stadium	33,964	Recap
15	December 12	Detroit Lions	**L** 14–21	4–9	Sun Devil Stadium	39,393	Recap
16	December 19	at Seattle Seahawks	**W** 30–27 (OT)	5–9	Kingdome	45,737	Recap
17	December 26	**New York Giants**	**W** 17–6	6–9	Sun Devil Stadium	53,414	Recap
18	January 2, 1994	at Atlanta Falcons	**W** 27–10	7–9	Georgia Dome	44,360	Recap
Note: Intra-division opponents are in **bold** text.

=== Game summaries ===
==== Week 1: at Philadelphia Eagles ====
Week 1: Phoenix Cardinals at Philadelphia Eagles – Game summary

Quarter	1	2	3	4	Total
Cardinals	0	3	7	7	**17**
**Eagles**	7	7	2	7	**23**

at Veterans Stadium, Philadelphia, Pennsylvania

- Date: September 5
- Game time: 1:00 p.m. EST/11:00 a.m. MST
- Game weather: 75 °F (24 °C)
- Game attendance: 59,831
- TV announcers (CBS): Jim Nantz and Randy Cross
- Box Score

Game information

**First quarter**

- PHI – Heath Sherman 1-yard run (Roger Ruzek kick). Eagles 7–0.

**Second quarter**

- PHI – Randall Cunningham 9-yard run (Roger Ruzek kick). Eagles 14–0.
- PHO – Greg Davis 24-yard field goal. Eagles 14–3.

**Third quarter**

- PHI – Team safety. Eagles 16–3.
- PHO – Larry Centers 27-yard pass from Chris Chandler (Greg Davis kick). Eagles 16–10.

**Fourth quarter**

- PHI – Vaughn Hebron 5-yard run (Roger Ruzek kick). Eagles 23–10.
- PHO – Lorenzo Lynch 55-yard fumble return (Greg Davis kick). Eagles 23–17.

**Top passers**

- PHO – Chris Chandler – 8/20, 96 yards, TD
- PHI – Randall Cunningham – 18/29, 192 yards, INT

**Top rushers**

- PHO – Ronald Moore – 9 rushes, 39 yards
- PHI – Vaughn Hebron – 10 rushes, 66 yards, TD

**Top receivers**

- PHO – Gary Clark – 5 receptions, 59 yards
- PHI – Fred Barnett – 7 receptions, 76 yards

==== Week 2: at Washington Redskins ====
Week 2: Phoenix Cardinals at Washington Redskins – Game summary

Quarter	1	2	3	4	Total
**Cardinals**	10	7	0	0	**17**
Redskins	0	0	7	3	**10**

at Robert F. Kennedy Memorial Stadium, Washington, District of Columbia

- Date: September 12
- Game time: 1:00 p.m. EST/11:00 a.m. MST
- Game weather: 66 °F (19 °C)
- Game attendance: 53,525
- TV announcers (CBS): Jim Nantz and Randy Cross
- Box Score

Game information

**First quarter**

- PHO – Johnny Bailey 58-yard punt return (Greg Davis kick). Cardinals 7–0.
- PHO – Greg Davis 53-yard field goal. Cardinals 10–0.

**Second quarter**

- PHO – Ronald Moore 18-yard run (Greg Davis kick). Cardinals 17–0.

**Third quarter**

- WAS – Ricky Sanders 9-yard pass from Cary Conklin (Chip Lohmiller kick). Cardinals 17–7.

**Fourth quarter**

- WAS – Chip Lohmiller 23-yard field goal. Cardinals 17–10.

**Top passers**

- PHO – Steve Beuerlein – 17/26, 164 yards, INT
- WAS – Cary Conklin – 16/29, 169 yards, TD, INT

**Top rushers**

- PHO – Garrison Hearst – 22 rushes, 76 yards
- WAS – Brian Mitchell – 10 rushes, 33 yards

**Top receivers**

- PHO – Gary Clark – 6 receptions, 93 yards
- WAS – Ricky Sanders – 5 receptions, 56 yards, TD

==== Week 3: vs. Dallas Cowboys ====
Week 3: Dallas Cowboys at Phoenix Cardinals – Game summary

Quarter	1	2	3	4	Total
**Cowboys**	7	3	7	0	**17**
Cardinals	0	0	7	3	**10**

at Sun Devil Stadium, Tempe, Arizona

- Date: September 19
- Game time: 6:00 p.m. MST
- Game weather: 80 °F (27 °C)
- Game attendance: 73,025
- TV announcers (TNT): Gary Bender and Pat Haden
- Box Score

Game information

**First quarter**

- DAL – Derrick Lassic 8-yard run (Eddie Murray kick). Cowboys 7–0.

**Second quarter**

- DAL – Eddie Murray 23-yard field goal. Cowboys 10–0.

**Third quarter**

- DAL – Derrick Lassic 2-yard run (Eddie Murray kick). Cowboys 17–0.
- PHO – Ricky Proehl 12-yard pass from Steve Beuerlein (Greg Davis kick). Cowboys 17–7.

**Fourth quarter**

- PHO – Greg Davis 20-yard field goal. Cowboys 17–10.

**Top passers**

- DAL – Troy Aikman – 21/27, 281 yards
- PHO – Steve Beuerlein – 20/27, 218 yards, TD, INT

**Top rushers**

- DAL – Derrick Lassic – 14 rushes, 60 yards, 2 TD
- PHO – Johnny Bailey – 7 rushes, 34 yards

**Top receivers**

- DAL – Alvin Harper – 6 receptions, 136 yards
- PHO – Randal Hill – 3 receptions, 76 yards

==== Week 4: at Detroit Lions ====
Week 4: Phoenix Cardinals at Detroit Lions – Game summary

Quarter	1	2	3	4	Total
Cardinals	0	17	0	3	**20**
**Lions**	6	10	7	3	**26**

at Pontiac Silverdome, Pontiac, Michigan

- Date: September 12
- Game time: 1:00 p.m. EST/11:00 a.m. MST
- Game weather: None (Indoor stadium)
- Game attendance: 57,180
- Box Score

Game information

**First quarter**

- DET – Jason Hanson 44-yard field goal. Lions 3–0.
- DET – Jason Hanson 22-yard field goal. Lions 6–0.

**Second quarter**

- PHO – Ricky Proehl 51-yard pass from Steve Beuerlein (Greg Davis kick). Cardinals 7–6.
- DET – Jason Hanson 33-yard field goal. Lions 9–7.
- DET – Derrick Moore 1-yard run (Jason Hanson kick). Lions 16–7.
- PHO – Walter Reeves 2-yard pass from Steve Beuerlein (Greg Davis kick). Lions 16–14.
- PHO – Greg Davis 54-yard field goal. Cardinals 17–16.

**Third quarter**

- DET – Brett Perriman 9-yard pass from Andre Ware (Jason Hanson kick). Lions 23–17.

**Fourth quarter**

- PHO – Greg Davis 30-yard field goal. Lions 23–20.
- DET – Jason Hanson 38-yard field goal. Lions 26–20.

**Top passers**

- PHO – Steve Beuerlein – 23/31, 288 yards, 2 TD
- DET – Andre Ware – 11/24, 194 yards, TD

**Top rushers**

- PHO – Garrison Hearst – 15 rushes, 45 yards
- DET – Barry Sanders – 23 rushes, 90 yards

**Top receivers**

- PHO – Ricky Proehl – 6 receptions, 99 yards, TD
- DET – Willie Green – 3 receptions, 102 yards

==== Week 6: vs. New England Patriots ====
Week 6: New England Patriots at Phoenix Cardinals – Game summary

Quarter	1	2	3	4	Total
**Patriots**	0	13	3	7	**23**
Cardinals	0	14	0	7	**21**

at Sun Devil Stadium, Tempe, Arizona

- Date: October 10
- Game time: 2:00 p.m. MST
- Game weather: 79 °F (26 °C)
- Game attendance: 36,115
- Box Score

Game information

**First quarter**

- No scoring plays

**Second quarter**

- NE – Ben Coates 4-yard pass from Drew Bledsoe (Scott Sisson kick). Patriots 7–0.
- PHO – Ricky Proehl 6-yard pass from Steve Beuerlein (Greg Davis kick). Tied 7–7.
- PHO – Ricky Proehl 15-yard pass from Steve Beuerlein (Greg Davis kick). Cardinals 14–7.
- NE – Scott Sisson 29-yard field goal. Cardinals 14–10.
- NE – Scott Sisson 23-yard field goal. Cardinals 14–13.

**Third quarter**

- NE – Scott Sisson 31-yard field goal. Patriots 16–14.

**Fourth quarter**

- PHO – Randal Hill 30-yard pass from Steve Beuerlein (Greg Davis kick). Cardinals 21–16.
- NE – Ben Coates 2-yard pass from Scott Secules (Scott Sisson kick). Patriots 23–21.

**Top passers**

- NE – Scott Secules – 12/20, 214 yards, TD, INT
- PHO – Steve Beuerlein – 14/28, 196 yards, 3 TD, 2 INT

**Top rushers**

- NE – Leonard Russell – 28 rushes, 116 yards
- PHO – Garrison Hearst – 10 rushes, 81 yards

**Top receivers**

- NE – Leonard Russell – 1 reception, 77 yards
- PHO – Randal Hill – 3 receptions, 65 yards, TD

==== Week 7: vs. Washington Redskins ====
Week 7: Washington Redskins at Phoenix Cardinals – Game summary

Quarter	1	2	3	4	Total
Redskins	3	0	3	0	**6**
**Cardinals**	0	13	7	16	**36**

at Sun Devil Stadium, Tempe, Arizona

- Date: October 17
- Game time: 2:00 p.m. MST
- Game weather: 66 °F (19 °C)
- Game attendance: 48,143
- Box Score

Game information

**First quarter**

- WAS – Chip Lohmiller 43-yard field goal. Redskins 3–0.

**Second quarter**

- PHO – Greg Davis 23-yard field goal. Tied 3–3.
- PHO – Greg Davis 45-yard field goal. Cardinals 6–3.
- PHO – Garrison Hearst 1-yard run (Greg Davis kick). Cardinals 13–3.

**Third quarter**

- PHO – Ricky Proehl 42-yard pass from Steve Beuerlein (Greg Davis kick). Cardinals 20–3.
- WAS – Chip Lohmiller 38-yard field goal. Cardinals 20–6.

**Fourth quarter**

- PHO – Team safety. Cardinals 22–6.
- PHO – Johnny Bailey 14-yard run (Greg Davis kick). Cardinals 29–6.
- PHO – Ronald Moore 1-yard run (Greg Davis kick). Cardinals 36–6.

**Top passers**

- WAS – Mark Rypien – 16/28, 120 yards, INT
- PHO – Steve Beuerlein – 12/25, 250 yards, TD, INT

**Top rushers**

- WAS – Ricky Ervins – 17 rushes, 98 yards
- PHO – Ronald Moore – 13 rushes, 80 yards, TD

**Top receivers**

- WAS – Ricky Ervins – 7 reception, 64 yards
- PHO – Ricky Proehl – 5 receptions, 115 yards, TD

==== Week 8: at San Francisco 49ers ====
Week 8: Phoenix Cardinals at San Francisco 49ers – Game summary

Quarter	1	2	3	4	Total
Cardinals	0	0	0	14	**14**
**49ers**	0	14	0	14	**28**

at Candlestick Park, San Francisco, California

- Date: October 24
- Game time: 1:00 p.m. PST/2:00 p.m. MST
- Game weather: 63 °F (17 °C)
- Game attendance: 62,020
- Box Score

Game information

**First quarter**

- No scoring plays

**Second quarter**

- SF – Marc Logan 1-yard run (Mike Cofer kick). 49ers 7–0.
- SF – Jerry Rice 8-yard pass from Steve Young (Mike Cofer kick). 49ers 14–0.

**Third quarter**

- No scoring plays

**Fourth quarter**

- SF – Jerry Rice 7-yard pass from Steve Young (Mike Cofer kick). 49ers 21–0.
- SF – Ricky Watters 19-yard run (Mike Cofer kick). 49ers 28–0.
- PHO – Anthony Edwards 65-yard pass from Steve Beuerlein (Greg Davis kick). 49ers 28–7.
- PHO – Ricky Proehl 4-yard pass from Steve Beuerlein (Greg Davis kick). 49ers 28–14.

**Top passers**

- PHO – Steve Beuerlein – 26/50, 334 yards, 2 TD, 3 INT
- SF – Steve Young – 21/33, 247 yards, 2 TD

**Top rushers**

- PHO – Ronald Moore – 15 rushes, 47 yards
- SF – Ricky Watters – 20 rushes, 95 yards, TD

**Top receivers**

- PHO – Anthony Edwards – 4 receptions, 112 yards, TD
- SF – Jerry Rice – 9 receptions, 155 yards, 2 TD

==== Week 9: vs. New Orleans Saints ====
Week 9: New Orleans Saints at Phoenix Cardinals – Game summary

Quarter	1	2	3	4	Total
**Saints**	7	0	3	10	**20**
Cardinals	10	7	0	0	**17**

at Sun Devil Stadium, Tempe, Arizona

- Date: October 31
- Game time: 2:00 p.m. MST
- Game weather: 65 °F (18 °C)
- Game attendance: 36,778
- Box Score

Game information

**First quarter**

- NO – Brad Muster 1-yard run (Morten Andersen kick). Saints 7–0.
- PHO – Greg Davis 28-yard field goal. Saints 7–3.
- PHO – Aeneas Williams 20-yard fumble return. Cardinals 10–7.

**Second quarter**

- PHO – Aeneas Williams 46-yard interception return. Cardinals 17–7.

**Third quarter**

- NO – Morten Andersen 48-yard field goal. Cardinals 17–10.

**Fourth quarter**

- NO – Quinn Early 25-yard pass from Wade Wilson (Morten Andersen kick). Tied 17–17.
- NO – Morten Andersen 38-yard field goal. Saints 20–17.

**Top passers**

- NO – Wade Wilson – 16/27, 186 yards, TD, INT
- PHO – Steve Beuerlein – 7/9, 52 yards

**Top rushers**

- NO – Derek Brown – 14 rushes, 32 yards
- PHO – Ronald Moore – 20 rushes, 72 yards

**Top receivers**

- NO – Eric Martin – 3 reception, 53 yards
- PHO – Ricky Proehl – 3 receptions, 24 yards

==== Week 10: vs. Philadelphia Eagles ====
Week 10: Philadelphia Eagles at Phoenix Cardinals – Game summary

Quarter	1	2	3	4	Total
Eagles	3	0	0	0	**3**
**Cardinals**	3	13	0	0	**16**

at Sun Devil Stadium, Tempe, Arizona

- Date: November 7
- Game time: 2:00 p.m. MST
- Game weather: 65 °F (18 °C)
- Game attendance: 41,634
- Box Score

Game information

**First quarter**

- PHI – Matt Bahr 27-yard field goal. Eagles 3–0.
- PHO – Greg Davis 23-yard field goal. Tied 3–3.

**Second quarter**

- PHO – Greg Davis 20-yard field goal. Cardinals 6–3.
- PHO – Gary Clark 10-yard pass from Chris Chandler (Greg Davis kick). Cardinals 13–3.
- PHO – Greg Davis 29-yard field goal. Cardinals 16–3.

**Third quarter**

- No scoring plays

**Fourth quarter**

- No scoring plays

**Top passers**

- PHI – Ken O'Brien – 14/32, 166 yards, INT
- PHO – Chris Chandler – 10/20, 121 yards, TD

**Top rushers**

- PHI – Herschel Walker – 8 rushes, 39 yards
- PHO – Ronald Moore – 36 rushes, 160 yards

**Top receivers**

- PHI – Mark Bavaro – 4 receptions, 48 yards
- PHO – Larry Centers – 4 receptions, 46 yards

==== Week 11: at Dallas Cowboys ====
Week 11: Phoenix Cardinals at Dallas Cowboys – Game summary

Quarter	1	2	3	4	Total
Cardinals	0	0	10	5	**15**
**Cowboys**	3	14	0	3	**20**

at Texas Stadium, Irving, Texas

- Date: November 14
- Game time: 12:00 p.m. CST/11:00 a.m. MST
- Game weather: 66 °F (19 °C)
- Game attendance: 64,224
- Box Score

Game information

**First quarter**

- DAL – Eddie Murray 44-yard field goal. Cowboys 3–0.

**Second quarter**

- DAL – Emmitt Smith 4-yard run (Eddie Murray kick). Cowboys 10–0.
- DAL – Jay Novacek 1-yard pass from Bernie Kosar (Eddie Murray kick). Cowboys 17–0.

**Third quarter**

- PHO – Greg Davis 19-yard field goal. Cowboys 17–3.
- PHO – Larry Centers 17-yard pass from Chris Chandler (Greg Davis kick). Cowboys 17–10.

**Fourth quarter**

- DAL – Eddie Murray 43-yard field goal. Cowboys 20–10.
- PHO – Team safety. Cowboys 20–12.
- PHO – Greg Davis 47-yard field goal. Cowboys 20–15.

**Top passers**

- PHO – Chris Chandler – 27/46, 214 yards, TD, INT
- DAL – Bernie Kosar – 13/21, 199 yards, TD

**Top rushers**

- PHO – Johnny Bailey – 8 rushes, 31 yards
- DAL – Emmitt Smith – 24 rushes, 81 yards, TD

**Top receivers**

- PHO – Ricky Proehl – 6 receptions, 66 yards
- DAL – Emmitt Smith – 4 receptions, 102 yards

==== Week 13: at New York Giants ====
Week 13: Phoenix Cardinals at New York Giants – Game summary

Quarter	1	2	3	4	Total
Cardinals	10	0	7	0	**17**
**Giants**	3	3	7	6	**19**

at Giants Stadium, East Rutherford, New Jersey

- Date: November 28
- Game time: 4:00 p.m. EST/2:00 p.m. MST
- Game weather: 60 °F (16 °C)
- Game attendance: 59,979
- Box Score

Game information

**First quarter**

- PHO – Greg Davis 47-yard field goal. Cardinals 3–0.
- PHO – Butch Rolle 1-yard pass from Steve Beuerlein (Greg Davis kick). Cardinals 10–0.
- NYG – David Treadwell 22-yard field goal. Cardinals 10–3.

**Second quarter**

- NYG – David Treadwell 37-yard field goal. Cardinals 10–6.

**Third quarter**

- NYG – Ed McCaffrey 20-yard pass from Phil Simms (David Treadwell kick). Giants 13–10.
- PHO – Ricky Proehl 17-yard pass from Steve Beuerlein (Greg Davis kick). Cardinals 17–13.

**Fourth quarter**

- NYG – David Treadwell 22-yard field goal. Cardinals 17–16.
- NYG – Brad Daluiso 54-yard field goal. Giants 19–17.

**Top passers**

- PHO – Steve Beuerlein – 19/33, 193 yards, 2 TD, INT
- NYG – Phil Simms – 22/41, 337 yards, TD

**Top rushers**

- PHO – Ronald Moore – 17 rushes, 53 yards
- NYG – Rodney Hampton – 11 rushes, 18 yards

**Top receivers**

- PHO – Ricky Proehl – 6 receptions, 81 yards
- NYG – Mark Jackson – 7 receptions, 113 yards

==== Week 14: vs. Los Angeles Rams ====
Week 14: Los Angeles Rams at Phoenix Cardinals – Game summary

Quarter	1	2	3	4	Total
Rams	3	0	0	7	**10**
**Cardinals**	7	7	14	10	**38**

at Sun Devil Stadium, Tempe, Arizona

- Date: December 5
- Game time: 2:00 p.m. MST
- Game weather: 55 °F (13 °C)
- Game attendance: 33,964
- Box Score

Game information

**First quarter**

- PHO – Ronald Moore 1-yard run (Greg Davis kick). Cardinals 7–0.
- LA – Tony Zendejas 22-yard field goal. Cardinals 7–3.

**Second quarter**

- PHO – Gary Clark 22-yard pass from Steve Beuerlein (Greg Davis kick). Cardinals 14–3.

**Third quarter**

- PHO – Ronald Moore 19-yard run (Greg Davis kick). Cardinals 21–3.
- PHO – Ronald Moore 1-yard run (Greg Davis kick). Cardinals 28–3.

**Fourth quarter**

- PHO – Greg Davis 27-yard field goal. Cardinals 31–3.
- PHO – Ronald Moore 1-yard run (Greg Davis kick). Cardinals 38–3.
- LA – Troy Drayton 4-yard pass from Jim Everett (Tony Zendejas kick). Cardinals 14–3.

**Top passers**

- LA – T.J. Rubley – 5/15, 89 yards, INT
- PHO – Steve Beuerlein – 14/25, 250 yards, TD

**Top rushers**

- LA – Jerome Bettis – 16 rushes, 115 yards
- PHO – Ronald Moore – 29 rushes, 126 yards, 4 TD

**Top receivers**

- LA – Henry Ellard – 3 receptions, 83 yards
- PHO – Gary Clark – 8 receptions, 159 yards, TD

==== Week 15: vs. Detroit Lions ====
Week 15: Detroit Lions at Phoenix Cardinals – Game summary

Quarter	1	2	3	4	Total
**Lions**	0	7	7	7	**21**
Cardinals	0	7	7	0	**14**

at Sun Devil Stadium, Tempe, Arizona

- Date: December 12
- Game time: 2:00 p.m. MST
- Game weather: 60 °F (16 °C)
- Game attendance: 39,393
- TV announcers (CBS): Verne Lundquist and Dan Fouts
- Box Score

Game information

**First quarter**

- No scoring plays

**Second quarter**

- PHO – Eric Blount 6-yard run (Greg Davis kick). Cardinals 7–0.
- DET – Herman Moore 6-yard pass from Erik Kramer (Jason Hanson kick). Tied 7–7.

**Third quarter**

- PHO – Ronald Moore 1-yard run (Greg Davis kick). Cardinals 14–7.
- DET – Rodney Holman 28-yard pass from Erik Kramer (Jason Hanson kick). Tied 14–14.

**Fourth quarter**

- DET – Willie Green 43-yard pass from Erik Kramer (Jason Hanson kick). Lions 21–14.

**Top passers**

- DET – Erik Kramer – 19/25, 257 yards, 3 TD
- PHO – Steve Beuerlein – 23/35, 219 yards, 3 INT

**Top rushers**

- DET – Derrick Moore – 20 rushes, 107 yards
- PHO – Ronald Moore – 20 rushes, 61 yards, TD

**Top receivers**

- DET – Herman Moore – 3 receptions, 66 yards, TD
- PHO – Larry Centers – 9 receptions, 77 yards

==== Week 16: at Seattle Seahawks ====
Week 16: Phoenix Cardinals at Seattle Seahawks – Game summary

Quarter	1	2	3	4	OT	Total
**Cardinals**	7	0	7	13	3	**30**
Seahawks	10	10	0	7	0	**27**

at Kingdome, Seattle, Washington

- Date: December 19
- Game time: 1:00 p.m. PST/2:00 p.m. MST
- Game weather: None (Indoor stadium)
- Game attendance: 45,737
- Box Score

Game information

**First quarter**

- SEA – Chris Warren 45-yard run (John Kasay kick). Seahawks 7–0.
- SEA – John Kasay 37-yard field goal. Seahawks 10–0.
- PHO – Randal Hill 58-yard pass from Steve Beuerlein (Greg Davis kick). Seahawks 10–7.

**Second quarter**

- SEA – John Kasay 47-yard field goal. Seahawks 13–7.
- SEA – Ferrell Edmunds 1-yard pass from Rick Mirer (John Kasay kick). Seahawks 20–7.

**Third quarter**

- PHO – Gary Clark 20-yard pass from Steve Beuerlein (Greg Davis kick). Seahawks 20–14.

**Fourth quarter**

- PHO – Larry Centers 16-yard pass from Steve Beuerlein (Greg Davis kick). Cardinals 21–20.
- PHO – Greg Davis 50-yard field goal. Cardinals 24–20.
- SEA – Rick Mirer 1-yard run (John Kasay kick). Seahawks 27–24.
- PHO – Greg Davis 55-yard field goal. Tied 27–27.

**Overtime**

- PHO – Greg Davis 41-yard field goal. Cardinals 30–27.

**Top passers**

- PHO – Steve Beuerlein – 34/53, 431 yards, 3 TD, 2 INT
- SEA – Rick Mirer – 15/30, 165 yards, TD

**Top rushers**

- PHO – Ronald Moore – 24 rushes, 62 yards
- SEA – Chris Warren – 27 rushes, 168 yards, TD

**Top receivers**

- PHO – Gary Clark – 12 receptions, 152 yards, TD
- SEA – Kelvin Martin – 4 receptions, 74 yards

==== Week 17: vs. New York Giants ====
Week 17: New York Giants at Phoenix Cardinals – Game summary

Quarter	1	2	3	4	Total
Giants	3	3	0	0	**6**
**Cardinals**	0	0	10	7	**17**

at Sun Devil Stadium, Tempe, Arizona

- Date: December 26
- Game time: 2:00 p.m. MST
- Game weather: 57 °F (14 °C)
- Game attendance: 53,414
- Box Score

Game information

**First quarter**

- NYG – David Treadwell 19-yard field goal. Giants 3–0.

**Second quarter**

- NYG – David Treadwell 22-yard field goal. Giants 6–0.

**Third quarter**

- PHO – Greg Davis 20-yard field goal. Giants 6–3.
- PHO – Ronald Moore 19-yard run (Greg Davis kick). Cardinals 10–6.

**Fourth quarter**

- PHO – Ronald Moore 1-yard run (Greg Davis kick). Cardinals 17–6.

**Top passers**

- NYG – Phil Simms – 21/30, 214 yards
- PHO – Steve Beuerlein – 15/24, 198 yards, 2 INT

**Top rushers**

- NYG – Rodney Hampton – 15 rushes, 38 yards
- PHO – Ronald Moore – 23 rushes, 135 yards, 2 TD

**Top receivers**

- NYG – Chris Calloway – 6 receptions, 69 yards
- PHO – Larry Centers – 5 receptions, 84 yards

==== Week 18: at Atlanta Falcons ====
Week 18: Phoenix Cardinals at Atlanta Falcons – Game summary

Quarter	1	2	3	4	Total
**Cardinals**	7	10	3	7	**27**
Falcons	3	0	7	0	**10**

at Georgia Dome, Atlanta, Georgia

- Date: January 2
- Game time: 1:00 p.m. EST/11:00 a.m. MST
- Game weather: None (Indoor stadium)
- Game attendance: 44,360
- Box Score

Game information

**First quarter**

- PHO – Randal Hill 7-yard pass from Steve Beuerlein (Greg Davis kick). Cardinals 7–0.
- ATL – Norm Johnson 24-yard field goal. Cardinals 7–3.

**Second quarter**

- PHO – Randal Hill 9-yard pass from Steve Beuerlein (Greg Davis kick). Cardinals 14–3.
- PHO – Greg Davis 29-yard field goal. Cardinals 17–3.

**Third quarter**

- ATL – Erric Pegram 19-yard run (Norm Johnson kick). Cardinals 17–10.
- PHO – Greg Davis 20-yard field goal. Cardinals 20–10.

**Fourth quarter**

- PHO – Gary Clark 20-yard pass from Steve Beuerlein (Greg Davis kick). Cardinals 27–10.

**Top passers**

- PHO – Steve Beuerlein – 27/33, 278 yards, 3 TD
- ATL – Bobby Hebert – 13/24, 131 yards, INT

**Top rushers**

- PHO – Ronald Moore – 32 rushes, 96 yards
- ATL – Erric Pegram – 12 rushes, 57 yards, TD

**Top receivers**

- PHO – Gary Clark – 9 receptions, 121 yards, TD
- ATL – Andre Rison – 4 receptions, 59 yards

This remains the last time the Cardinals have beaten the Falcons on the road.

=== Standings ===
NFC East
	W	L	T	PCT	PF	PA	STK
^{(1)} Dallas Cowboys	12	4	0	.750	376	229	W5
^{(4)} New York Giants	11	5	0	.688	288	205	L2
Philadelphia Eagles	8	8	0	.500	293	315	W3
Phoenix Cardinals	7	9	0	.438	326	269	W3
Washington Redskins	4	12	0	.250	230	345	L2
