= Derek Ware =

Derek Ware may refer to:

- Derek Ware (American football)
- Derek Ware (actor)
