= Spencer Webb =

American football player (2000–2022)

- Webb in 2021

No. 18
- Position: Tight end

Personal information
- Born: April 7, 2000; Dixon, California, U.S.
- Died: July 13, 2022 (aged 22); Lane County, Oregon, U.S.
- Listed height: 6 ft 6 in (1.98 m)

Career information
- High school: Christian Brothers High School (Sacramento, California)
- College: Oregon (2018–2022)

Spencer Webb (April 7, 2000 – July 13, 2022) was an American football tight end. He played college football for the Oregon Ducks.

== Early life ==
Webb grew up in Dixon, California, where he was athletic from a young age. He excelled in baseball, basketball and football before schools began acknowledging his promise on the football field. He attended Christian Brothers High School in Sacramento, California, where he played football and finished with 61 catches for 1,063 yards and 23 touchdowns. Sacramento State offered a full-ride scholarship by his sophomore year, and others were inquiring as well. He was a first-team all-state selection as a senior and was named to the all-metro team by The Sacramento Bee. He was a consensus four-star recruit and was rated the number one tight end in California by both 247Sports and ESPN. He was ranked the 254th prospect by ESPN300, the number 6 tight end overall, and one of the top 30 recruits from California.

== College career ==
Webb committed to Oregon over offers from California, Colorado State, Florida State, Hawaii, San Diego State, UCLA, Texas A&M, Wyoming, and Oregon State, among others. As a freshman in 2018, Webb saw action in two games as a redshirt.

At the start of the 2019 season, Webb changed from tight end to more of a split-out receiver role due to injuries to several players at the position. Against Auburn in the season-opener, Webb caught his first career pass, a 20-yard touchdown from quarterback Justin Herbert. He finished the game with three catches for 28 yards. Against the number 25 ranked Washington Huskies on October 19, he caught a 12-yard touchdown in the opening drive and finished with two catches for 31 yards. He caught three passes for first downs and finished with 42 receiving yards the following week against the Washington State Cougars. Webb caught his third touchdown of the season against Arizona on November 16. He finished the year with 18 catches for 209 yards and three scores, being one of only five Power Five freshmen tight ends to score at least three times. He caught at least one pass in nine out of the 14 games and helped the Ducks compile a 12–2 record.

Webb was injured in the 2020 fall camp, resulting in him playing only one game in a COVID-19-shortened 2020 season. His only time on the field came against USC in the 2020 Pac-12 Conference Championship Game, as the Ducks won their second consecutive conference title. In 2021, head coach Mario Cristobal said that "Losing [Webb] last year was something that really hurt us offensively."

Overall, in 2021 as a sophomore, Webb appeared in all of the Ducks' 14 games and recorded 13 receptions for 87 yards and one touchdown. He played as the starting tight end in three matches and made at least one catch in nine games, with multiple catches in three games. He appeared on a total of 280 snaps (276 offense, four special teams), and made two tackles on special teams. Webb started in the season opener against Fresno State on September 4 and recorded a season-high three receptions for seven yards. He helped the Ducks pull off a historic upset over the Ohio State Buckeyes the following week, making two catches for 32 yards, including one catch that was a 30-yard gain. Against Arizona on September 25, Webb made his fourth career touchdown catch in the fourth quarter on a pass from quarterback Anthony Brown. He appeared in Oregon's Alamo Bowl loss against the Oklahoma Sooners, which was the final game of his career, starting at tight end and making one reception for six yards.

In his four seasons at the University of Oregon, Webb made 31 catches for 296 yards and scored four touchdowns.

== Death ==
Webb died on July 13, 2022, after hitting his head in a cliff-diving accident near Triangle Lake, Oregon. He was 22 years old. According to the Lane County Sheriff's Office, there was no evidence of foul play and his death appeared to be accidental. After he died, it was revealed that his girlfriend was weeks pregnant with his child. His son, Spider, was born in March 2023.

== See also ==
- List of gridiron football players who died during their careers
