= Asante Cleveland =

American football player (born 1992)

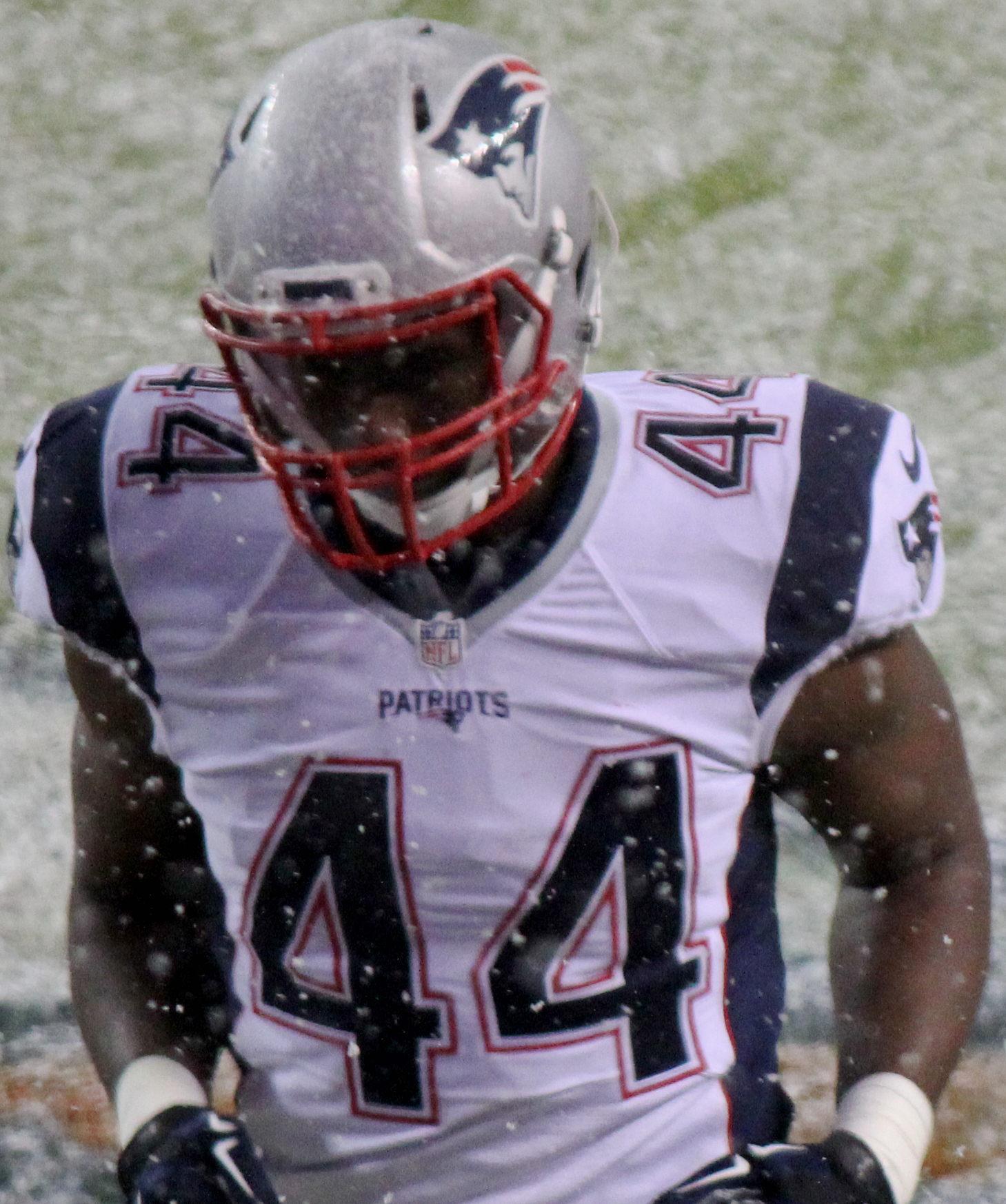
- Cleveland with the New England Patriots in 2015

No. 44, 45
- Position: Tight end

Personal information
- Born: March 21, 1992 (age 34); Sacramento, California, U.S.
- Listed height: 6 ft 5 in (1.96 m)
- Listed weight: 260 lb (118 kg)

Career information
- High school: Christian Brothers (Sacramento)
- College: Miami (FL)
- NFL draft: 2014: undrafted

Career history
- San Francisco 49ers (2014); New England Patriots (2015); San Diego / Los Angeles Chargers (2015–2017)

Career NFL statistics
- Receptions: 1
- Receiving yards: 1
- Stats at Pro Football Reference

Asante Cleveland (born March 21, 1992) is an American former professional football player who was a tight end in the National Football League (NFL). He played college football for the Miami Hurricanes and attended Christian Brothers High School in Sacramento, California. He was a member of the San Francisco 49ers, New England Patriots, and San Diego / Los Angeles Chargers.

== Early life ==
Cleveland played high school football for the Christian Brothers High School Falcons. He earned all-league honors as a junior after leading the team with 21 receptions for 262 yards and four touchdowns. He recorded 24 receptions for 412 yards and seven touchdowns during his senior year.

== College career ==
Cleveland played from 2010 to 2013 at the University of Miami for the Hurricanes.

== Professional career ==
Pre-draft measurables
Height	Weight	40-yard dash	10-yard split	20-yard split	20-yard shuttle	Three-cone drill	Vertical jump	Broad jump	Bench press
6 ft 5 in (1.96 m)	261 lb (118 kg)	4.88 s	1.71 s	2.81 s	4.45 s	7.33 s	32 1/2 in (0.83 m)	9 ft 8 in (2.95 m)	20 reps
All values from Miami (FL) Pro Day

=== San Francisco 49ers ===
Cleveland was signed by the San Francisco 49ers on May 10, 2014, after going unselected in the 2014 NFL draft. He was released by the 49ers on August 30, and was re/signed to the team's practice squad the following day. Cleveland was promoted to the active roster on September 20. Cleveland made his NFL debut the next day, against the Arizona Cardinals.

=== New England Patriots ===
Cleveland was traded to the New England Patriots in exchange for Jordan Devey on August 18, 2015. He was released by the Patriots on September 5, and subsequently re-signed to the team's practice squad the following day. Cleveland was promoted to the active roster on November 27, and appeared briefly, recording one catch for one yard in the Patriots' 30–24 loss to the Denver Broncos on November 29. Cleveland was released by the Patriots on December 25.

=== San Diego / Los Angeles Chargers ===
Cleveland signed with the San Diego Chargers on December 28, 2015. On September 4, 2016, he was released by the Chargers. Cleveland was then re-signed to the Chargers' practice squad. He was promoted to the active roster on September 24. On August 7, 2017, Cleveland was waived/injured by the Chargers and placed on injured reserve.
