= Christian Brothers High School (Sacramento, California) =

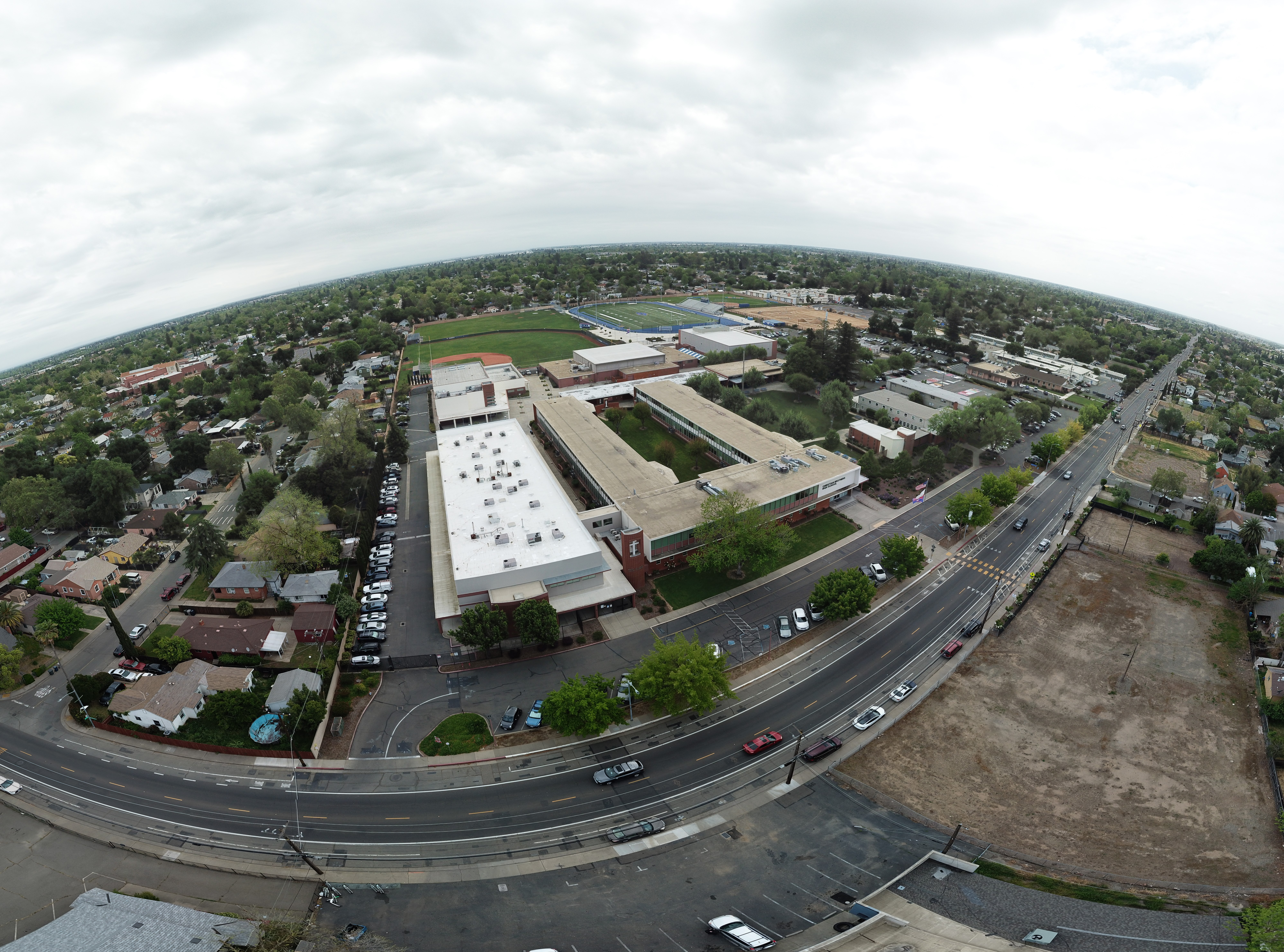
- Christian Brothers Campus, entrance off MLK Jr. Blvd.

Location
- 4315 Martin Luther King, Jr. Blvd; Sacramento, California; United States; 38°32′10″N 121°27′49″W

Information
- Former names: St. Patrick's Institute and Sacramento Institute (1876–1896) Christian Brothers College (1896–1924); Christian Brothers School (1924–1964) Bishop Armstrong High School (1956–1968)
- Type: Private, Catholic, coeducational secondary education institution
- Motto: Enter to Learn, Leave to Serve
- Religious affiliations: Christianity (De La Salle Brothers)
- Denomination: Catholicism
- Established: 17 July 1876; 150 years ago
- Founder: Patrick Scanlan
- CEEB code: 052697
- Principal: David Perry
- Grades: 9–12
- Enrollment: 1,150 (2020–21)
- Student to teacher ratio: 16:1
- Campus size: 24 acres (97,000 m^{2})
- Color: Red - white - blue
- Athletics conference: Capital Valley Conference
Sports
Football Basketball Baseball Softball Volleyball Lacrosse Rugby; Soccer	Golf; Tennis; Diving Swimming Water polo Track & field Cross country
- Mascot: Falcons
- Rival: Saint Francis High School, Jesuit High School (Sacramento)
- Accreditation: WASC, WCEA
- Publication: Connection magazine
- Newspaper: CB Talon
- Yearbook: The Crest
- Website: www.cbhs-sacramento.org

Christian Brothers High School is a private, Catholic, college-preparatory high school in the Oak Park neighborhood of Sacramento, California, United States. It is located within the Diocese of Sacramento and was founded by the De La Salle Christian Brothers in 1876. As of 2021, the school enrolled 1,150 students drawn from approximately 75 local parochial, private, and public elementary and middle schools.

== History ==
=== St. Patrick's Institute and Sacramento Institute (1876–1896) ===
In the 1870s, Fr. Patrick Scanlan, the pastor of St. Rose's Parish in Sacramento, initiated fundraising and social efforts with the purpose of opening a large high school to serve the city's Catholic youth. His parish already had a small and rather informal elementary school but lacked a secondary school. The De La Salle Christian Brothers were asked to teach at the school, and they accepted the offer. After around two years of fundraising, Fr. Scanlan began construction of a building to house the school on an empty plot of parish land. The new school was three stories tall, with Georgian details, and surrounded by tall elm trees. The Sacramento Union described the structure upon its creation as:

plain in style, yet not cold and formal. It is of wood with rustic finish and has ornamental arched openings and tasteful trimmings.

On the first floor were a kitchen and dining room. The second floor held two classrooms and two 'study parlors.' Two more classrooms, boarders' quarters, and the Brothers' quarters were located on the third floor. Another portion of the building held three uncompleted classrooms. Each classroom had space to hold 65 students.

The Archbishop of San Francisco (Sacramento was not its own diocese yet), Joseph Sadoc Alemany, officiated at the dedication ceremony, blessing and dedicating what was then known as St. Patrick's Institute.

On 17 July 1876, St. Patrick's opened for its first day of classes, with seven Brothers and 200 students. By the end of the school year, 50 more students had enrolled, and the three unfinished classrooms were completed out of necessity. Subjects taught were the standard ones, with special emphasis placed on languages, art and music, a curricular feature not found in the Sacramento Public Schools. The tuition varied according to each family's respective financial situation, and students whose families could not pay were given a free ride on behalf of the school. In the schools early years, there was no access to electricity or a sewage system. These were added in 1895 and 1890, respectively. In 1879, St. Patrick's Institute was renamed Sacramento Institute. The school experienced tremendous growth in the following years, as families recognized it for its excellent education but also the increasing dismay with the public school system at the time.

=== Christian Brothers College (1896–1924) ===
In 1896, the school was once again renamed, this time to Christian Brothers College, a name meant to reflect the institution's great emphasis on advanced secondary learning in a classical, rather than technical, curricular format.

During the 1890s, the De La Salle Brothers in the United States became increasingly at odds with their more traditional European, and especially French, counterparts, over which educational style the Brothers should espouse. The American Brothers had, for years, been instructing students in classical subjects such as music, art, business skills, Greek and Latin. The French Brothers disapproved of this, holding that the Brothers should hold to their roots, teaching practical subjects to working-class students. In 1894 the Congregation Chapter had banned the teaching of languages and ordered the classical departments of their schools closed. In 1921, the Pope nullified this ban, and classical education at the school resumed. Because of this ban, the college developed a technical program to replace the classical courses.

In 1898, the college director, Br. Ambrose O'Malley, died while sailing to France, and was replaced by Br. Vellesian Mallon. The new director spearheaded plans to expand the physical campus of the school to accommodate the growing student body. When he departed for a new assignment two years later, the plans were still on paper. With $5,000 from a wealthy donor, the school added a new wing. However, this was not enough to both contain the growing enrollment and maintain the aging building. During the early 20th century, the college facilities went into decline. Brother Vivian Melody, director from 1919 until 1922, had the foundation reinforced and the building painted. Still, this was but a short-term repair. In 1919 alone, three small fires struck the school, causing little damage but acting as a 'wakeup call' to the college leadership.

Br. Vellesian Mallon returned as principal (a new title for the position formerly titled "director") in 1922, and decided to sell the building and build anew at a different site. The college's urban location had become increasingly developed and commercialized, so the property would sell for a high price which could be used to purchase a larger plot. Conveniently, Bishop Thomas Grace donated the school a property on what is now 21st Street and Broadway. The original property was sold to Weinstock, Lubin, Co., who built a department store on the site for $210,000 ($2,918,000 in 2015 dollars). While the new structure was being built, Christian Brothers College operated out of an empty Sacramento public school building, with the Christian Brothers and boarders living in cottages elsewhere in the city.

=== Christian Brothers School (1924–1964) ===
On 15 September 1924, the school reopened in a new building and under a new name, Christian Brothers School, which better suited the elementary through high school courses offered. The new building was an imposing two-story Mission Revival structure, with a bell tower crowning the center of the front façade. It housed classrooms, laboratories, Brothers' and boarders' housing, and space for a gymnasium to be completed.

Following the 1929 stock market crash, the school's formerly full coffers were now nearly empty. Much of the school's money went towards subsidizing poor students' tuition, and little was left for building maintenance. Most repairs on the building were contributed by parents or friends of the school, who often spent hours painting, repairing mechanical systems, or working on construction projects. The West Coast District of the De La Salle Christian Brothers went bankrupt, and Christian Brothers School's yearbook, The Sacrafornian, ceased publication.

By the 1940s, the school rejected around 200 applicants each year due to overcrowding, and school administration was considering moving campus yet again. By 1954, the elementary and middle school grades were eliminated to reduce overcrowding in the high school.

In 1955, the Christian Brothers, in a cooperative effort with the Diocese of Sacramento, began laying out plans for a new high school to replace the aging facilities at Christian Brothers High School and two other Catholic schools. It would be named Bishop Armstrong High School and situated in a larger and separate location from Christian Brothers School.

The plan was to merge certain upper grades of three schools, all with growing student bodies and aging facilities: the girls' schools St. Francis High School and St. Joseph's Academy, and the boys' Christian Brothers School.

The architect, Harry Devine, planned a modern building, with four wings with 14 classrooms each, with a total of 56 classrooms. It was designed to hold approximately 1,000 students, and would operate as a co-instructional institution, but not a coeducational one. This means that males and females would attend classes in the same campus, but classes would be single-sex only. Male and female students would only share the cafeteria and the gymnasium during the school day, but most extracurriculars would be coed, as well as social events such as dances.

Construction of the new high school began in November 1955, and it was dedicated on 24 March 1957 by Cardinal James Francis McIntyre of the Archdiocese of Los Angeles.

=== Bishop Armstrong High School (1956–1968) ===
Bishop Armstrong High School opened for classes in 1957 with 532 students, all juniors and seniors. Before attending Bishop Armstrong, the boys would attend Christian Brothers School, and the girls St. Francis or St. Joseph's, for Grades 9 and 10. For Grades 11 and 12, all of those students would attend and graduate from Bishop Armstrong. The school originally opened with only two of the proposed four wings completed. By 1964, the temporary and unorthodox education structure between the three schools was in its final year. The next year, St. Joseph's Academy closed permanently, and St. Francis moved the combined female student body to new and separate campus. The boys remained on the Bishop Armstrong campus, under a new name, Christian Brothers High School.

=== Christian Brothers High School (1968–present) ===
1968 was Christian Brothers High School's first school year with the entire student body now united on one campus, after nine years of a split school.

During the 1980s, an influx of cheap suburban real estate caused CBHS to consider a move further out of the city. In the end, the school's strong historical connection to the City of Sacramento caused CBHS leadership to decide against the move.

In the late 1970s, spurred by the preparation for closure by the all-girls Bishop Manogue High School, began to consider becoming a coeducational institution. In November 1989, the Christian Brothers High School leadership announced that the school would begin accepting girls, and would be adopting the Bishop Manogue students. CBHS invested $400,000 in renovation and structural changes to prepare for the change. By the start of the 1990 school year, the school had jumped from 532 students the year before to over 900. As well as the demographic jump, the school finances, which had formerly been struggling, were greatly improved.

In 1991, in response to the greatly increased enrollment, the school switched to a president-principal model of leadership. Br. Richard Camara became the school's first president, and Dominic Puglisi took up the position of principal.

The school's third classroom section, the Science, Math and Technology Wing, opened in 2001. Also that year saw the beginning of KBFT, a closed-circuit television station, with programming starring, produced, and broadcast entirely by Christian Brothers High School students.

In 2008, a new field house was constructed.

Loretto High School, an all-girls institution, closed at the end of the 2009 school year. As with Bishop Manogue High School 20 years before, CBHS accepted their students for the 2009–2010 school year. 128 girls joined the school, bringing the enrollment to 50/50 male/female for the first time since the school became coeducational.

== Accreditation and affiliations ==
Christian Brothers High School is accredited by the Western Association of Schools and Colleges and the Western Catholic Education Association.

CBHS is affiliated with the National Education Council of Christian Brothers, the Christian Brothers' Secondary School Administrators' Association, the San Francisco District of the Brothers of the Christian Schools, Saint Mary's College of California, the National Catholic Educational Association, California Scholarship Federation, National Honor Society, the California Association of Student Councils, Sierra Valley Conference, Sac-Joaquin Section of the California Interscholastic Federation, and the National Association for College Admission Counseling.

== Academics ==
=== Curriculum ===
Christian Brothers High School students enroll in a college-preparatory curriculum. Students are generally required to take seven classes each semester. CB offers a variety of college-prep classes, accelerated classes, honors classes, and advanced-placement (AP classes). 95% of CB graduates enroll in college.

=== Admission ===
Christian Brothers invites a wide range of students to apply for admission. Students accepted to the 9th grade each year include students from Catholic elementary schools, students of alumni and families currently enrolled as well as those from other religious institutions and private and public schools. Because applications exceed the number of spaces available, all applicants are asked to take the placement indicator exam (held on the third Saturday in January), submit a parent/student questionnaire, transcripts and teacher evaluation forms.

== Publications ==
=== Newspaper ===
The Talon is Christian Brothers High School's newspaper.

=== Magazine ===
Christian Brothers High School's magazine is the Connection.

=== Yearbook ===
Christian Brothers High School's original yearbook was The Sacrafornian. It was published from 1925 until 1929, when the Great Depression caused it to cease publication for financial reasons. In 1947, after an 18-year hiatus, the yearbook returned under the title The Gael. It was issued until the closing of the 21st and Broadway Street campus in 1964. Also published during the same years was The Resident Gael, a yearbook published for the boarding students.

The current yearbook, The Crest, began at Bishop Armstrong High School in 1957 and has been published ever since.

== KBFT (student television station) ==
KBFT is the student television station at Christian Brothers High School. It was founded in 2001.

KBFT broadcasts a live, closed-circuit program to all students and staff as well as to a web audience at cbtalon.com twice per week. The "Talon Morning News" is a ten- to fifteen-minute program that includes school announcements, world news, sports, weather (previously featuring the insightful weather broadcasting of Collin Lygren) and more. The show is run entirely by students. KBFT has received national recognition by STN, the Student Television Network, and has been ranked as the No. 1 high school news broadcast in the nation in 2003, 2004, 2005, 2006 and 2008. KBFT was also awarded the number one live sports broadcast in the nation in 2007.

KBFT is also renowned for Zeller Food Reviews, a show which aired in the latter half of the 18th season for six episodes. Featuring CB student Andres Zeller, the program consisted of short, satirical, two-minute segments in which the school's cafeteria food was eaten and critiqued. The show urged viewers to try the cafeteria food. The segment was lauded by the faculty and student body alike, and remains today as one of the crowning achievements of KBFT in its over 20 years of running.

Several graduates of Christian Brothers High School who participated in KBFT have pursued careers in media. Graduates have worked at local Sacramento stations KOVR, KCRA, KTXL, and the San Diego station KFMB.

== List of directors, presidents and principals ==
St. Patrick's Institute (1876–79)
Director		Years	
Br. Cianin Griffin, FSC		1876–79	
Sacramento Institute (1879–96)
Director		Years	
Br. Bertram, FSC		1879–80	
Br. Sabinian Downey, FSC		1880–81	
Br. Bosonis John, FSC		1881–83	
Br. Genebern Steiner, FSC		1883–86	
Br. Cianin Griffin, FSC		1886–89	
Br. Bosonis John, FSC		1889–92	
Br. Cianin Griffin, FSC		1892–94	
Br. Walter Erminold, FSC		1894–95	
Br. Ambrose O'Malley, FSC		1895–98	
Christian Brothers College (1896–1924)
Director		Years	
Br. Ambrose O'Malley, FSC		1894–98	
Br. Vellesian Mallon, FSC		1898–1900	
Br. Walter Erminold, FSC		1900–04	
Br. Victorinus Leo Burns, FSC		1904–06	
Br. Florinus Peter Doyle, FSC		1906–09	
Br. Victorinus Leo Burns, FSC		1909–11	
Br. Florinus Peter Doyle, FSC		1911–14	
Br. George Deagle, FSC		1914–15	
Br. Jasper Fitzsimmons, FSC		1915–19	
Br. Vivian Melody, FSC		1919–22	
Br. Vellesian Mallon, FSC		1922–25	
Christian Brothers School (1924–64)
Principal		Years	
Br. Vellesian Mallon, FSC		1922–25	
Br. Lewis Treacey, FSC		1925–27	
Br. Vilfridian Thomas Ryan, FSC		1927–28	
Br. Nicholas O'Connor, FSC		1928–32	
Br. Lewis Tracy, FSC		1932–35	
Br. Patrick Halligan, FSC		1935–39	
Br. William Cyril Boselli, FSC		1939–45	
Br. William Nilan, FSC		1945–48	
Br. Bertram Coleman, FSC		1948–52	
Br. Vincent McEnerney, FSC		1952–54	
Br. Xavier Joy, FSC		1954–57	
Br. Pius Snook, FSC		1957–63	
Bishop Armstrong High School (1956–1968)
Principal		Years	
Boys' Section: Br. Gabriel Murphy, FSC		1956–59	
Boys' Section: Br. Eugene Ward, FSC		1959–65	
Br. Ronald Charshaf, FSC		1965–70	
Christian Brothers High School (1968–)
Principal		Years	
Br. Ronald Charshaf, FSC		1965–70	
Br. Martin Fallin, FSC		1970–73	
Br. Ronald Roggenback, FSC		1973–79	
Br. Jerome Gallegos, FSC		1979–81	
Br. Richard Camara, FSC		1981–91	
President	Years	Principal	Years
Br. Richard Camara, FSC	1991–92	Mr. Dominic Puglisi	1991–94
Dr. Donald Gillott, PhD	1993–96	Mr. Dominic Puglisi	1991–94
Dr. Donald Gillott, PhD	1993–96	Br. Stephen Rusyn, FSC	1994–97
Mr. Mark Warren	1996–2004	Mr. Tom Rutten	1997–2001
Mr. Mark Warren	1996–2004	Mrs. Cecilia Powers	2001–02
Mr. Mark Warren	1996–2004	Mr. Rudolph Schulze	2002–04
Mr. Lorcan P. Barnes	2004–2020	Mr. Raymond Burnell	2005–10
Mr. Lorcan P. Barnes	2004–2020	Mrs. Mary Hesser	2010–16
Mr. Lorcan P. Barnes	2004–2020	Mr. John O'Connor	2016–17
Mr. Lorcan P. Barnes	2004–2020	Mr. Chris Orr	2017–19
Mr. Lorcan P. Barnes	2004–2020	Mrs. Annemarie Bacich, Ed.M.	2019–23
Dr. Crystal LeRoy, Ed.D.	2020–2025	Dr. David Perry, Ed.D.	2023–2025
Dr. David Perry, Ed.D.	2025-present	Mrs. Cecilia Powers	2025-present

== Notable alumni ==
- Max Baer Jr., actor
- Matt Braly, creator of Amphibia
- Asante Cleveland, NFL tight end
- Jim Cox, NFL offensive guard and linebacker for the San Francisco 49ers
- Andy Fox, MLB Player, 2x World Series Champion ('96 Yankees, '03 Marlins)
- Gary Hoffman, NFL offensive tackle for Green Bay Packers, San Francisco 49ers
- Asa Jackson, NFL cornerback
- Sherwood "Shakey" Johnson, co-founder of Shakey's Pizza
- John Walter "Duster" Mails, MLB player
- John McNamara, MLB player and manager
- Eason Ramson, NFL tight end for St. Louis Cardinals, San Francisco 49ers, Buffalo Bills
- Richard Rodriguez, author and journalist
- Ken Rose, NFL linebacker for the New York Jets, Cleveland Browns, Philadelphia Eagles
- Kevin Sutherland, professional golfer
- Mallory Velte, freestyle wrestler for USA Wrestling
- Derek Ware, NFL tight end for the Phoenix Cardinals, Arizona Cardinals, Cincinnati Bengals, Dallas Cowboys
- Spencer Webb, college football player
- Frederick T. West, orthodontist
- Ahkello Witherspoon, NFL cornerback for the Los Angeles Rams
