= Jordan Devey =

American football player (1988–2026)

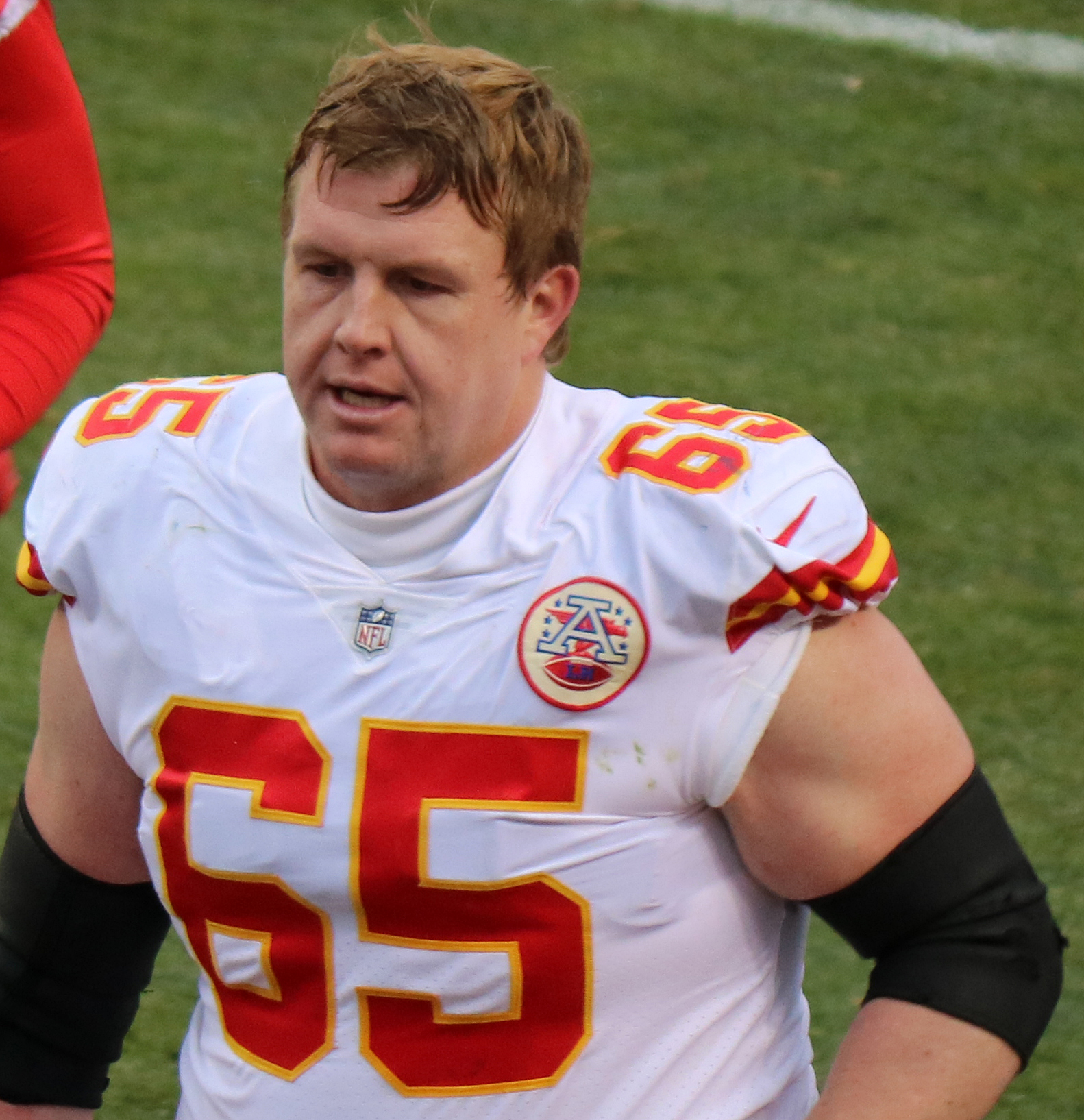
- Devey with the Kansas City Chiefs in 2017

No. 65, 68
- Position: Guard

Personal information
- Born: January 11, 1988; American Fork, Utah, U.S.
- Died: July 21, 2026 (aged 38); Boise, Idaho, U.S.
- Listed height: 6 ft 7 in (2.01 m)
- Listed weight: 320 lb (145 kg)

Career information
- High school: American Fork
- College: Snow College (2009–2010); Memphis (2011–2012)
- NFL draft: 2013: undrafted

Career history
- Baltimore Ravens (2013)*; New England Patriots (2013–2014); San Francisco 49ers (2015); Kansas City Chiefs (2016–2018); Oakland Raiders (2019); Buffalo Bills (2020)
- * Offseason or practice squad member only

Awards and highlights
- Super Bowl champion (XLIX); Second-team All-C-USA (2012)

Career NFL statistics
- Games played: 44
- Games started: 21
- Stats at Pro Football Reference

Jordan Devey (January 11, 1988 – July 21, 2026) was an American professional football guard who played in the National Football League (NFL) for eight seasons. He played college football for the Memphis Tigers, receiving second-team All-C-USA honors in 2012. Devey began his NFL career in 2013 as an undrafted free agent with the New England Patriots, where he spent his first two seasons and was a member of the team that won Super Bowl XLIX. He also played for the San Francisco 49ers, Kansas City Chiefs, Oakland Raiders, and Buffalo Bills.

== Early life ==
Devey suffered from Osgood–Schlatter disease from playing football in junior high school, and did not play in high school. He later recovered.

He played the tuba in the American Fork High School band and played on the baseball team. Despite qualifying for several music scholarships, he served a mission in Costa Rica for The Church of Jesus Christ of Latter-Day Saints for two years.

== College career ==
Devey attended Snow College in Ephraim, Utah, where played several positions on the football team. He transferred to the University of Memphis, playing at right tackle, right guard and left tackle. He received the DeAngelo Williams Most Valuable Player Award.

== Professional career ==
Pre-draft measurables
Height	Weight	Arm length	Hand span	Wingspan	40-yard dash	10-yard split	20-yard split	20-yard shuttle	Three-cone drill	Vertical jump	Broad jump	Bench press
6 ft 6 5/8 in (2.00 m)	317 lb (144 kg)	32 3/4 in (0.83 m)	9 5/8 in (0.24 m)	6 ft 6 1/2 in (1.99 m)	5.25 s	1.85 s	3.05 s	4.57 s	7.91 s	24.0 in (0.61 m)	8 ft 2 in (2.49 m)	21 reps
All values from NFL Combine/Pro Day

=== Baltimore Ravens ===
On April 27, 2013, Devey signed with the Baltimore Ravens as an undrafted free agent.

=== New England Patriots ===
On September 5, 2013, Devey was signed to the New England Patriots' practice squad after an off-season stint. He spent the 2014 preseason seeing action at center, guard and tackle. In the 2014 season, Devey was promoted to the active roster. In the regular season, Devey started six games at guard. The Patriots won Super Bowl XLIX after they defeated the Seattle Seahawks, 28-24.

=== San Francisco 49ers ===
On August 18, 2015, Devey was traded to the San Francisco 49ers in exchange for tight end Asante Cleveland. On March 8, 2016, 49ers decided to tender a one-year contract to Devey. On May 6, the 49ers waived Devey.

=== Kansas City Chiefs ===
On May 9, 2016, the Kansas City Chiefs claimed Devey off waivers from the 49ers. On September 4, he was waived by the Chiefs and re–signed to the practice squad the following day. Devey was elevated to the active roster on September 17. He was released by the Chiefs on November 5, and was re-signed to the practice squad three days later.

Devey signed a reserve/future contract with the Chiefs on January 19, 2017. He was released once more on September 7. Devey was re-signed by Kansas City on September 9.

On March 16, 2018, Devey re-signed with the Chiefs. He played in the first seven games, starting two at guard and center due to injuries, before being placed on injured reserve with a torn pectoral muscle.

=== Oakland and Las Vegas Raiders ===
On March 21, 2019, Devey signed with the Oakland Raiders on a one-year deal. He was placed on injured reserve on October 5.

On April 2, 2020, Devey was re-signed by the Las Vegas Raiders. He was released by Las Vegas on September 1.

=== Buffalo Bills ===
On September 9, 2020, Devey was signed to the Buffalo Bills' practice squad. He was elevated to the active roster on October 24 and January 8, 2021, for the team's Week 7 and wild card playoff games against the New York Jets and Indianapolis Colts, and reverted to the practice squad after each game. Devey was promoted to the active roster on January 12.

Devey signed a one-year contract extension with the team on February 1, 2021. He was released by the Bills as a part of final roster cuts on August 31.

== Personal life and death ==
In 2011, he married Lindsey Devey. They had four children together.

Jordan Devey died by suicide on July 21, 2026, at the age of 38.
