= Terry Samuels =

American football player (born 1970)

No. 89, 44
- Position: Tight end

Personal information
- Born: September 26, 1970 (age 56); Louisville, Kentucky, U.S.
- Listed height: 6 ft 2 in (1.88 m)
- Listed weight: 254 lb (115 kg)

Career information
- High school: Louisville Male
- College: Kentucky
- NFL draft: 1994: 6th round, 172nd overall pick

Career history
- Arizona Cardinals (1994–1995); Nashville Kats (1997); Arizona Rattlers (1998)

Career NFL statistics
- Receptions: 10
- Receiving yards: 76
- Return yards: 6
- Stats at Pro Football Reference

Career AFL statistics
- Rushing yards: 155
- Receptions: 12
- Receiving yards: 152
- Total touchdowns: 14
- Stats at ArenaFan.com

Terrance Eugene Samuels (born September 26, 1970) is an American former professional football player who was a tight end for the Arizona Cardinals of the National Football League (NFL). He played college football for the Kentucky Wildcats. Samuels was selected in the sixth round of the 1994 NFL draft with the 172nd overall pick. He also played in the Arena Football League (AFL) for the Nashville Kats and Arizona Rattlers.
