= Wesley Leasy =

American football player (born 1971)

No. 52
- Position: Linebacker

Personal information
- Born: September 7, 1971 (age 55); Vicksburg, Mississippi, U.S.
- Listed height: 6 ft 2 in (1.88 m)
- Listed weight: 234 lb (106 kg)

Career information
- High school: Greenville (MS)
- College: Mississippi State
- NFL draft: 1995: 7th round, 224th overall pick

Career history
- Arizona Cardinals (1995–1996); Winnipeg Blue Bombers (1998)
- Stats at Pro Football Reference

Wesley Leasy (born September 7, 1971) is an American former professional football linebacker. He played for the Arizona Cardinals from 1995 to 1996. He was selected by the Cardinals in the seventh round of the 1995 NFL draft with the 224th overall pick.
