= Oscar McBride =

American football player (born 1972)

No. 87
- Position: Tight end

Personal information
- Born: July 23, 1972 (age 54); Gainesville, Florida, U.S.
- Listed height: 6 ft 5 in (1.96 m)
- Listed weight: 266 lb (121 kg)

Career information
- High school: Chiefland (Chiefland, Florida)
- College: Notre Dame
- NFL draft: 1995: undrafted

Career history
- Arizona Cardinals (1995–1996); Kansas City Chiefs (1997)*
- * Offseason or practice squad member only

Career NFL statistics
- Receptions: 13
- Receiving yards: 112
- Touchdowns: 2
- Stats at Pro Football Reference

Oscar Bernard McBride (born July 23, 1972) is an American former professional football player who was a tight end in the National Football League (NFL) for the Arizona Cardinals. He played college football for the Notre Dame Fighting Irish.
