= Simon Shanks =

American football player (1971–2006)

Profile
- Position: Linebacker

Personal information
- Born: October 16, 1971; Laurel, Mississippi
- Died: January 5, 2006 (aged 34)

Career information
- College: Tennessee State

Career history
- 1995: Arizona Cardinals
- Stats at Pro Football Reference

Simon Shanks (October 16, 1971 – January 5, 2006) was a National Football League player for the Arizona Cardinals in 1995. An alumnus of Tennessee State University, he played linebacker in his sole professional season, leading the Cardinals defense with 27 tackles. Shanks was killed in a robbery at his home in Phoenix on January 5, 2006. Three men approached Shanks and his friend in his garage working out. His wife was locked in the bathroom of the house while the men beat Shanks and his friend. They were both shot, with Shanks being shot fatally. His other friend was shot in the neck, surviving.
