= Brian Henesey =

American football player (born 1969)

No. 39
- Position: Running back

Personal information
- Born: December 10, 1969 (age 56); Villanova, Pennsylvania, U.S.
- Listed height: 5 ft 10 in (1.78 m)
- Listed weight: 215 lb (98 kg)

Career information
- High school: Radnor
- College: Bucknell
- NFL draft: 1992: undrafted

Career history
- Arizona Cardinals (1994); Philadelphia Eagles (1995)*
- * Offseason or practice squad member only
- Stats at Pro Football Reference

Brian P. Henesey (born December 10, 1969) is an American former professional football player who was a running back for the Arizona Cardinals of the National Football League (NFL). He played college football for the Bucknell Bison.

== Professional career ==
Henesey played three games with the Arizona Cardinals in 1994.

== Personal life ==
Henesey married Caroline who played basketball at Bucknell. He has son named Brian and daughter Kate who plays soccer for Bucknell and Delaware.
