= George Martinez (American football) =

American football player and coach (born 1961)

Biographical details
- Born: August 5, 1961 (age 65); Fort Bragg, North Carolina, U.S.
- Education: Northwestern Oklahoma State University

Playing career

Football
- 1977–1980: Northwestern Oklahoma State

Coaching career (HC unless noted)

Football
- 1981–1987: East Central (assistant)
- 1988: Oklahoma Panhandle State
- 1989–1991: New Mexico Highlands
- 1994–1995: Arizona Cardinals (RB)
- 2006–2008: Oakland Raiders (LB)

Head coaching record
- Overall: 11–28

George Martinez (born August 5, 1961) is an American football coach and former player. He served as the head football coach at Oklahoma Panhandle State University in 1988 and at Northwestern Oklahoma State University from 1989 to 1991, compiling a career college football coaching record of 11–28. He currently serves as a football coach at Agua Fria High School in Avondale, Arizona.
