= Ronnie Jones (American football) =

American football coach (born 1955)

Biographical details
- Born: October 17, 1955 (age 71); Dumas, Texas, U.S.

Coaching career (HC unless noted)
- 1978–1983: Northeastern State (GA)
- 1984: Tulsa (S&C)
- 1985–1986: Arizona State (S&C)
- 1987–1990: Philadelphia Eagles (S&C)
- 1991: Los Angeles Rams (S&C/LB)
- 1992: Los Angeles Raiders (LB)
- 1993: Houston Oilers (LB)
- 1994–1995: Arizona Cardinals (DC)
- 1996–1999: UTEP (DC)
- 2000: Buffalo Bills (ST)
- 2001: Ottawa (KS)
- 2002–2004: West Texas A&M
- 2006–2014: Martin HS (TX) (DC/LB)
- 2015–2020: Lakeview Centennial HS (TX) (DC/ST)
- 2021–2022: Emerson HS (TX) (DC)
- 2023–2025: Northwestern Oklahoma State

Head coaching record
- Overall: 16–59

Ronnie Joe Jones (born October 17, 1955) is an American football coach. Jones has served on coaching staffs at numerous colleges and National Football League (NFL) teams. He was the head football coach for Ottawa University in 2001, West Texas A&M University from 2002 to 2004, and Northwestern Oklahoma State University from 2023 to 2025.

== Early life and coaching career ==
A native of Sunray, Texas, Jones graduated from Sunray High School in 1974. He went on to receive a bachelor's degree from Northwestern Oklahoma State University and a master's degree from Northeastern State University. While at Northeastern, he began his coaching career. In 1984, he joined John Cooper's staff at the University of Tulsa as strength and conditioning coach and moved with him to Arizona State University a year later.

In 1987, he joined Buddy Ryan's coaching staff with the Philadelphia Eagles. After two stints with the Los Angeles Rams and Los Angeles Raiders in 1991 and 1992, respectively, Jones rejoined Ryan as linebackers coach for the Houston Oilers in 1993. As Ryan became head coach for the Arizona Cardinals, he selected Jones as his defensive coordinator. In 1995, Arizona ranked last in total defense in the NFL, giving up 26.4 points and 356.5 total yards per game. Ryan and his complete staff were fired subsequently.

Heading back to the collegiate ranks, Jones became defensive coordinator at the University of Texas at El Paso under coach Charlie Bailey. In 2000, Bailey was replaced by Gary Nord, so Jones went on to coach the special teams for the Buffalo Bills. Bills owner Ralph Wilson was unimpressed with Jones's work with the team and demanded Jones's firing after one season; when head coach Wade Phillips refused, Wilson fired them both.

In 2001, Jones became head coach at Ottawa University, a small NAIA school in Ottawa, Kansas. The Ottawa Braves, coming off a 9–0 season in 2000, finished 6–4 under Jones, who then left for West Texas A&M University.

Despite making the bold statement that West Texas A&M would win an NCAA Division II national football championship under his guidance, Jones amassed only a 5–27 record as Buffaloes head coach. Jones was suspended with pay on April 13, 2005, amid allegations that he had misused university resources for personal gain. Jones resigned as the Buffaloes' head coach five days later on April 18 after a university investigation discovered that Jones had been running a marketing business out of his office. The investigation also stated that Jones abused his authority by exerting undue influence on student athletes and employees by soliciting membership in his marketing business. University police seized Jones' computer and found inappropriate material on it.

== Head coaching record ==
Year	Team	Overall	Conference	Standing
Ottawa Braves (Kansas Collegiate Athletic Conference) (2001)
2001	Ottawa	6–4	6–3	T–3rd
Ottawa:		6–4	6–3	
West Texas A&M Buffaloes (Lone Star Conference) (2002–2004)
2002	West Texas A&M	0–11	0–8 / 0–6	13th / 7th (South)
2003	West Texas A&M	3–8	2–6 / 2–4	T–10th / T–4th (South)
2004	West Texas A&M	2–8	2–7 / 1–5	T–10th / T–6th (South)
West Texas A&M:		5–27	4–21	
Northwestern Oklahoma State Rangers (Great American Conference) (2023–2025)
2023	Northwestern Oklahoma State	1–10	1–10	11th
2024	Northwestern Oklahoma State	2–9	2–9	T–11th
2025	Northwestern Oklahoma State	2–9	2–9	T–9th
Northwestern Oklahoma State:		5–28	5–28	
Total:		16–59		
