= Wendall Gaines =

American football player (born 1972)

No. 89
- Position: Defensive lineman

Personal information
- Born: January 17, 1972 (age 54); Vernon, Texas, U.S.
- Listed height: 6 ft 5 in (1.96 m)
- Listed weight: 290 lb (132 kg)

Career information
- College: Oklahoma State

Career history
- Arizona Cardinals (1994–1995); Greenbay Packers (1996)*; St. Louis Rams (1996)*; Kansas City Chiefs (1997)*; St. Louis Rams (1998)*; Scottish Claymores (1998); Philadelphia Eagles (1998)*; Arizona Rattlers (2000–2008)
- * Offseason or practice squad member only
- Stats at Pro Football Reference
- Stats at ArenaFan.com

Wendell Gaines (born January 17, 1972) is an American former football defensive lineman for the Arizona Rattlers of the Arena Football League. He was signed by the Arizona Cardinals as an undrafted free agent in 1994. He played college football at Oklahoma State. On March 25, 2002, Gaines re-signed with the Rattlers.
