= Ronald Moore (American football) =

American football player (born 1970)

No. 30, 33, 29, 20, 34
- Position: Running back

Personal information
- Born: January 26, 1970 (age 56); Spencer, Oklahoma, U.S.
- Listed height: 5 ft 10 in (1.78 m)
- Listed weight: 220 lb (100 kg)

Career information
- High school: Star Spencer (Spencer)
- College: Pittsburg State
- NFL draft: 1993: 4th round, 87th overall pick
- Expansion draft: 1999: 1st round, 31st overall pick

Career history
- Phoenix/Arizona Cardinals (1993–1994); New York Jets (1995–1996); St. Louis Rams (1997); Arizona Cardinals (1997); Miami Dolphins (1998); Cleveland Browns (1999)*
- * Offseason or practice squad member only

Awards and highlights
- NCAA Division II national champion (1991); Harlon Hill Trophy (1992)

Career NFL statistics
- Rushing yards: 2,210
- Rushing average: 3.5
- Rushing touchdowns: 14
- Stats at Pro Football Reference

Ronald Lynn Moore (born January 26, 1970) is an American former professional football player who was a running back in the National Football League (NFL). He played for four different teams in six seasons during the 1990s. He played college football for the Pittsburg State Gorillas.

== Biography ==
Listed at 5 feet 10 inches (1.78 m) and 220 pounds (100 kg), Moore played at Pittsburg State University as a running back. He was also a member of Alpha Phi Alpha. He was selected by the Phoenix Cardinals in the fourth round of the 1993 NFL draft.

Moore played in six National Football League (NFL) seasons, from 1993 to 1998. His best season as a pro came during his rookie season for the Cardinals when he rushed for 1,018 yards and nine touchdowns. He was the winner of the 1992 Harlon Hill Trophy. He later spent time with the New York Jets, St. Louis Rams, and Miami Dolphins.

In 2021, Moore and his family were contestants on Family Feud.
