= Derek Ware (American football) =

American football player (born 1967)

No. 85, 88, 89
- Position: Tight end

Personal information
- Born: September 17, 1967 (age 59); Sacramento, California, U.S.
- Listed height: 6 ft 2 in (1.88 m)
- Listed weight: 255 lb (116 kg)

Career information
- High school: Christian Brothers (Sacramento)
- College: Central Oklahoma
- NFL draft: 1992: 7th round, 175th overall pick

Career history
- Phoenix/Arizona Cardinals (1992–1994); Cincinnati Bengals (1994–1995); Dallas Cowboys (1996)

Career NFL statistics
- Receptions: 24
- Receiving yards: 270
- Touchdowns: 1
- Stats at Pro Football Reference

Derek Gene Ware (born September 17, 1967) is an American former professional football player who was a tight end in the National Football League (NFL) for the Arizona Cardinals, Cincinnati Bengals, and Dallas Cowboys. He played college football for the Central Oklahoma Bronchos.

== Early life ==
Ware attended Christian Brothers High School, where he competed in football and baseball. He was selected by the Toronto Blue Jays in the 31st round of the 1985 Major League Baseball draft.

He spent two summers in the Blue Jays' farm system before deciding to focus on football.

== College career ==
Ware enrolled at Sacramento City College. In two seasons he registered 32 catches for 605 yards.

He transferred to Texas A&M University in 1990. In November, he was dismissed by the team after getting in trouble with the law and decided to transfer to the University of Central Oklahoma. He finished the season after appearing in 12 games with 11 receptions for 181 yards and 2 touchdowns.

As a senior, although he only had 8 receptions for the Central Oklahoma Bronchos football team, he also collected 3 sacks as a defensive end.

== Professional career ==
Ware was selected by the Phoenix Cardinals in the seventh round (175th overall) of the 1992 NFL draft. He was mostly a reserve player during his first two years in the league. His best season came in 1994, when he appeared in 15 games with 12 starts, while making 17 receptions for 171 yards and one touchdown. On December 20, 1994, he was waived.

On December 22, 1994, he was claimed off waivers by the Cincinnati Bengals. In 1995, he appeared in 7 games, making 2 receptions for 36 yards.

On August 10, 1996, he was signed as a free agent by the Dallas Cowboys, to provide depth at tight end, with Eric Bjornson been limited with a hamstring injury and Jay Novacek unlikely to play in the season with a back injury. He started in the season opener against the Chicago Bears, making one reception for 5 yards. On October 2, 1996, he was released. On November 13, 1996, he was re-signed. On December 3, 1996, he was released 12 days after tight end Johnny Mitchell was signed as a free agent. He appeared in 5 games with one start, making one reception for 5 yards.
