= Chad Brown (defensive end) =

American football player (born 1971)

No. 78
- Position: Defensive end

Personal information
- Born: July 9, 1971 (age 55); Thomasville, Georgia, U.S.
- Listed height: 6 ft 7 in (2.01 m)
- Listed weight: 265 lb (120 kg)

Career information
- High school: Thomasville
- College: Ole Miss
- NFL draft: 1993: 8th round, 199th overall pick

Career history
- Phoenix/Arizona Cardinals (1993–1995)
- Stats at Pro Football Reference

Chadrick Chico Brown (born July 9, 1971) is an American former professional football defensive end who played for the Phoenix/Arizona Cardinals of the National Football League (NFL). He played college football at Ole Miss, and was selected by the Cardinals in the eighth round of the 1993 NFL draft.

== Early life ==
Chadrick Chico Brown was born on July 9, 1971, in Thomasville, Georgia. He attended Thomasville High School.

== College career ==
Brown first played college football at Northeastern Oklahoma A&M College. In February 1991, he transferred to the University of Mississippi, where he was a two-year letterman for the Ole Miss Rebels from 1991 to 1992. In December 1992, Jim Carmody said Brown was "as good as anybody I've ever coached."

== Professional career ==
Pre-draft measurables
Height	Weight	Arm length	Hand span	40-yard dash	10-yard split	20-yard split	20-yard shuttle	Vertical jump	Broad jump	Bench press
6 ft 6 1/4 in (1.99 m)	268 lb (122 kg)	34 1/4 in (0.87 m)	9 1/2 in (0.24 m)	5.13 s	1.76 s	2.94 s	4.62 s	29.5 in (0.75 m)	9 ft 3 in (2.82 m)	19 reps
All values from NFL Combine

Brown was selected by the Phoenix Cardinals in the eighth round, with the 199th overall pick, of the 1993 NFL draft. He signed with the team on July 15, 1993. He played in five games during the 1993 season and posted one solo tackle. Brown appeared in eight games, starting two, in 1994, recording four solo tackles and four assisted tackles. He played in five games, starting four, during the 1995 season, totaling six solo tackles, eight assisted tackles, and 0.5 sacks. Brown was released on November 29, 1995. He signed with the Cardinals again on March 22, 1996, but was released on July 11, 1996.
