= 1992 Phoenix Cardinals season =

NFL team season

- Owner: Bill Bidwill
- General manager: Larry Wilson
- Head coach: Joe Bugel
- Offensive coordinator: Jerry Rhome
- Defensive coordinator: Fritz Shurmur
- Home stadium: Sun Devil Stadium

Results
- Record: 4–12
- Division place: 5th NFC East
- Playoffs: Did not qualify
- Pro Bowlers: CB Robert Massey; SS Tim McDonald; P Rich Camarillo; KR Johnny Bailey

The 1992 Phoenix Cardinals season was the 73rd season the team was in the National Football League (NFL). The team matched their previous output of 4–12. The Cardinals failed to qualify to the playoffs for the tenth straight season.

Two of the Cardinals’ victories came at the expense of playoff-bound teams. Phoenix defeated the defending Super Bowl champion Redskins in week five, and in week nine, the Cards toppled the 49ers, who finished the regular season with the NFL’s best record of 14–2.

== Offseason ==
=== NFL draft ===
The Cardinals selected the following players in the 1992 NFL draft.

1992 Phoenix Cardinals draft
Round	Pick	Player	Position	College	Notes
2	46	Tony Sacca	Quarterback	Penn State	
3	61	Ed Cunningham	Center	Washington	
4	91	Jeff Christy	Center	Pittsburgh	
4	100	Michael Bankston	Defensive end	Sam Houston State	
6	146	Brian Brauninger	Tackle	Oklahoma	
7	175	Derek Ware	Tight end	Central Oklahoma	
8	202	Eric Blount	Wide receiver	North Carolina	
9	229	David Henson	Defensive tackle	Central Arkansas	
9	239	Tyrone Williams	Wide receiver	Western Ontario	
10	259	Reggie Yarbrough	Running back	Cal State Fullerton	
11	286	Rob Baxley	Tackle	Iowa	
12	313	Lance Wilson	Defensive tackle	Texas	
Made roster * Made at least one Pro Bowl during career

=== Undrafted free agents ===
1992 undrafted free agents of note
Player	Position	College
Rodenck Coleman	Tight end	Indiana
Doug Dutton	Defensive tackle	Indiana State
Bernard Edwards	Wide receiver	Ohio State
Robert Jackson	Wide receiver	Central State
Andy Kelly	Quarterback	Tennessee
Keith Rucker	Defensive tackle	Ohio Wesleyan
Kelly Sims	Cornerback	Cincinnati
Alphonso Taylor	Defensive tackle	Temple

== Personnel ==
=== Staff ===
1992 Phoenix Cardinals staff
Front office: President – Bill Bidwill; Vice president and general manager – Larry Wilson; Director of pro personnel – Erik Widmark; Director of college scouting – Bob Ackles; Head coaches: Head coach – Joe Bugel; Offensive coaches: Offensive coordinator – Jerry Rhome; Running backs – Bobby Jackson; Receivers – Ted Plumb; Offensive line – John Matsko	Defensive coaches: Defensive coordinator – Fritz Shurmur; Defensive line – Ted Cottrell; Inside linebackers/quality control – Mike Murphy; Outside linebackers – Joe Pascale; Defensive secondary – Jim Johnson; Special teams coaches: Special teams – Pete Rodriguez; Strength and conditioning: Strength and conditioning – Bob Rogucki

== Roster ==
1992 Phoenix Cardinals roster
Quarterbacks (QB): 17 Chris Chandler; 3 Timm Rosenbach; 19 Tony Sacca; Running backs (RB): 20 Johnny Bailey; 25 Eric Blount; 33 Ivory Lee Brown; 37 Larry Centers FB; 39 Johnny Johnson; Wide receivers (WR): 83 Anthony Edwards KR; 81 Randal Hill; 86 Ernie Jones; 87 Ricky Proehl; Tight ends (TE): 89 Walter Reeves; 82 Butch Rolle; 85 Derek Ware; 80 Willie Wright	Offensive linemen (OL): 70 Rob Baxley T; 59 Ed Cunningham C; 51 Bill Lewis C; 73 Mark May G; 67 Luis Sharpe T; 61 Lance Smith G; 69 Vernice Smith G; 74 Danny Villa T; 68 Joe Wolf G; Defensive linemen (DL): 63 Michael Bankston NT; 93 Reuben Davis DE; 94 Jeff Faulkner DE; 75 Mike Jones DE; 79 Keith Rucker NT; 98 Eric Swann DE	Linebackers (LB): 58 Eric Hill ILB; 97 Steve Hyche OLB; 53 Garth Jax ILB; 50 Freddie Joe Nunn OLB; 52 Jessie Small OLB; 90 Tyronne Stowe LB; Defensive backs (DB): 21 Dexter Davis CB; 31 Odie Harris CB/S; 29 Lorenzo Lynch CB; 40 Robert Massey CB; 46 Tim McDonald SS; 26 Chris Oldham; 35 Aeneas Williams CB; 38 Mike Zordich FS; Special teams (ST): 16 Rich Camarillo P; 5 Greg Davis K	Practice squad: 62 Jeff Christy C; 30 Kelvin Fisher RB; 41 Robert Jackson WR; 64 James Richards G; 95 Alphonso Taylor DT; 47 active, 9 inactive, 5 practice squad Reserve: 54 David Braxton LB (IR); 67 Rick Cunningham T (IR); 22 Dave Duerson S (IR); 56 Ken Harvey LB (IR); 91 David Henson NT (IR); 55 Jock Jones LB (IR); 28 Steve Lofton CB (IR); 27 Jay Taylor CB (IR); 60 Willie Williams T (IR); Rookies in italics

== Preseason ==
Week	Date	Opponent	Result	Record	Venue	Attendance
1	August 8	San Diego Chargers	W 35–14	1–0	Sun Devil Stadium	28,298
2	August 15	Chicago Bears	W 20–17	2–0	Sun Devil Stadium	47,026
3	August 22	at Seattle Seahawks	L 10–17	2–1	Kingdome	51,007
4	August 28	at Denver Broncos	W 21–17	3–1	Mile High Stadium	66,743

== Regular season ==
=== Schedule ===
Week	Date	Opponent	Result	Record	Venue	Attendance	Recap
1	September 6	at Tampa Bay Buccaneers	**L** 7–23	0–1	Tampa Stadium	41,315	Recap
2	September 13	**Philadelphia Eagles**	**L** 14–31	0–2	Sun Devil Stadium	42,533	Recap
3	September 20	at **Dallas Cowboys**	**L** 20–31	0–3	Texas Stadium	62,575	Recap
4	Bye						
5	October 4	**Washington Redskins**	**W** 27–24	1–3	Sun Devil Stadium	34,488	Recap
6	October 11	at **New York Giants**	**L** 21–31	1–4	Giants Stadium	70,042	Recap
7	October 18	New Orleans Saints	**L** 21–30	1–5	Sun Devil Stadium	27,735	Recap
8	October 25	at **Philadelphia Eagles**	**L** 3–7	1–6	Veterans Stadium	64,676	Recap
9	November 1	San Francisco 49ers	**W** 24–14	2–6	Sun Devil Stadium	47,642	Recap
10	November 8	at Los Angeles Rams	**W** 20–14	3–6	Anaheim Stadium	40,788	Recap
11	November 15	at Atlanta Falcons	**L** 17–20	3–7	Georgia Dome	58,477	Recap
12	November 22	**Dallas Cowboys**	**L** 10–16	3–8	Sun Devil Stadium	72,439	Recap
13	November 29	at **Washington Redskins**	**L** 3–41	3–9	RFK Stadium	53,541	Recap
14	December 6	San Diego Chargers	**L** 21–27	3–10	Sun Devil Stadium	26,880	Recap
15	December 12	**New York Giants**	**W** 19–0	4–10	Sun Devil Stadium	29,452	Recap
16	December 20	at Indianapolis Colts	**L** 13–16	4–11	Hoosier Dome	46,763	Recap
17	December 27	Tampa Bay Buccaneers	**L** 3–7	4–12	Sun Devil Stadium	29,645	Recap
Note: Intra-division opponents are in **bold** text.

=== Game summaries ===
==== Week 1: at Tampa Bay Buccaneers ====
Week 1: Phoenix Cardinals at Tampa Bay Buccaneers – Game summary

Quarter	1	2	3	4	Total
Cardinals	0	7	0	0	**7**
**Buccaneers**	3	7	10	3	**23**

at Tampa Stadium, Tampa, Florida

- Date: September 6
- Game time: 4:00 p.m. EST/2:00 p.m. MST
- Game weather: 81 °F (27 °C)
- Game attendance: 41,315
- Box Score

Game information

**First quarter**

- TB – Ken Willis 40-yard field goal. Buccaneers 3–0.

**Second quarter**

- PHO – Anthony Thompson 3-yard run (Greg Davis kick). Cardinals 7–3.
- TB – Reggie Cobb 1-yard run (Ken Willis kick). Buccaneers 10–7.

**Third quarter**

- TB – Ken Willis 45-yard field goal. Buccaneers 13–7.
- TB – Ron Hall 1-yard pass from Vinny Testaverde (Ken Willis kick). Buccaneers 20–7.

**Fourth quarter**

- TB – Ken Willis 23-yard field goal. Buccaneers 23–7.

**Top passers**

- PHO – Timm Rosenbach – 12/22, 77 yards, INT
- TB – Vinny Testaverde – 14/25, 167 yards, TD

**Top rushers**

- PHO – Johnny Bailey – 6 rushes, 35 yards
- TB – Reggie Cobb – 18 rushes, 70 yards, TD

**Top receivers**

- PHO – Randal Hill – 7 receptions, 58 yards
- TB – Lawrence Dawsey – 6 receptions, 76 yards

==== Week 2: vs. Philadelphia Eagles ====
Week 2: Philadelphia Eagles at Phoenix Cardinals – Game summary

Quarter	1	2	3	4	Total
**Eagles**	3	14	7	7	**31**
Cardinals	0	14	0	0	**14**

at Sun Devil Stadium, Tempe, Arizona

- Date: September 13
- Game time: 6:00 p.m. MST
- Game weather: 92 °F (33 °C)
- Game attendance: 42,533
- Box Score

Game information

**First quarter**

- PHI – Roger Ruzek 33-yard field goal. Eagles 3–0.

**Second quarter**

- PHI – Fred Barnett 17-yard pass from Randall Cunningham (Roger Ruzek kick). Eagles 10–0.
- PHO – Ricky Proehl 10-yard pass from Chris Chandler (Greg Davis kick). Eagles 10–7.
- PHO – Ernie Jones 46-yard pass from Chris Chandler (Greg Davis kick). Cardinals 14–10.
- PHI – Calvin Williams 10-yard pass from Randall Cunningham (Roger Ruzek kick). Eagles 17–14.

**Third quarter**

- PHI – Fred Barnett 73-yard pass from Randall Cunningham (Roger Ruzek kick). Eagles 24–14.

**Fourth quarter**

- PHI – Reggie White 37-yard fumble return (Roger Ruzek kick). Eagles 31–14.

**Top passers**

- PHI – Randall Cunningham – 17/22, 267 yards, 3 TD
- PHO – Chris Chandler – 17/29, 211 yards, 2 TD

**Top rushers**

- PHI – Herschel Walker – 28 rushes, 115 yards
- PHO – Larry Centers – 1 rush, 28 yards

**Top receivers**

- PHI – Fred Barnett – 8 receptions, 193 yards, 2 TD
- PHO – Randal Hill – 5 receptions, 109 yards

==== Week 3: at Dallas Cowboys ====
Week 3: Phoenix Cardinals at Dallas Cowboys – Game summary

Quarter	1	2	3	4	Total
Cardinals	7	3	3	7	**20**
**Cowboys**	14	7	7	3	**31**

at Texas Stadium, Irving, Texas

- Date: September 20
- Game time: 3:00 p.m. CST/2:00 p.m. MST
- Game weather: 84 °F (29 °C)
- Game attendance: 62,575
- Box Score

Game information

**First quarter**

- DAL – Michael Irvin 87-yard pass from Troy Aikman (Lin Elliott kick). Cowboys 7–0.
- PHO – Randal Hill 34-yard pass from Chris Chandler (Greg Davis kick). Tied 7–7.
- DAL – Michael Irvin 41-yard pass from Troy Aikman (Lin Elliott kick). Cowboys 14–7.

**Second quarter**

- DAL – Emmitt Smith 1-yard run (Lin Elliott kick). Cowboys 21–7.
- PHO – Greg Davis 22-yard field goal. Cowboys 21–10.

**Third quarter**

- DAL – Michael Irvin 4-yard pass from Troy Aikman (Lin Elliott kick). Cowboys 28–10.
- PHO – Greg Davis 42-yard field goal. Cowboys 28–13.

**Fourth quarter**

- DAL – Lin Elliott 29-yard field goal. Cowboys 31–13.
- PHO – Ivory Lee Brown 1-yard run (Greg Davis kick). Cowboys 31–20.

**Top passers**

- PHO – Chris Chandler – 28/43, 383 yards, TD
- DAL – Troy Aikman – 14/21, 263 yards, 3 TD

**Top rushers**

- PHO – Ivory Lee Brown – 12 rushes, 31 yards, TD
- DAL – Emmitt Smith – 26 rushes, 112 yards, TD

**Top receivers**

- PHO – Ernie Jones – 5 receptions, 78 yards
- DAL – Michael Irvin – 8 receptions, 210 yards, 3 TD

==== Week 5: vs. Washington Redskins ====
Week 5: Washington Redskins at Phoenix Cardinals – Game summary

Quarter	1	2	3	4	Total
Redskins	14	3	7	0	**24**
**Cardinals**	0	0	6	21	**27**

at Sun Devil Stadium, Tempe, Arizona

- Date: October 4
- Game time: 2:00 p.m. MST
- Game weather: 82 °F (28 °C)
- Game attendance: 34,488
- Box Score

Game information

**First quarter**

- WAS – Ricky Sanders 19-yard pass from Mark Rypien (Chip Lohmiller kick). Redskins 7–0.
- WAS – Earnest Byner 9-yard run (Chip Lohmiller kick). Redskins 14–0.

**Second quarter**

- WAS – Chip Lohmiller 33-yard field goal. Redskins 17–0.

**Third quarter**

- PHO – Ivory Lee Brown 1-yard run (kick failed). Redskins 17–6.
- WAS – Earnest Byner 3-yard run (Chip Lohmiller kick). Redskins 24–6.

**Fourth quarter**

- PHO – Robert Massey 31-yard interception return (Greg Davis kick). Redskins 24–13.
- PHO – Robert Massey 41-yard interception return (Greg Davis kick). Redskins 24–20.
- PHO – Larry Centers 9-yard pass from Chris Chandler (Greg Davis kick). Cardinals 27–24.

**Top passers**

- WAS – Mark Rypien – 12/28, 258 yards, TD, 3 INT
- PHO – Chris Chandler – 21/31, 196 yards, TD, 2 INT

**Top rushers**

- WAS – Earnest Byner – 20 rushes, 73 yards, 2 TD
- PHO – Ivory Lee Brown – 10 rushes, 48 yards, TD

**Top receivers**

- WAS – Gary Clark – 4 receptions, 106 yards
- PHO – Ernie Jones – 5 receptions, 52 yards

==== Week 6: at New York Giants ====
Week 6: Phoenix Cardinals at New York Giants – Game summary

Quarter	1	2	3	4	Total
Cardinals	7	7	0	7	**21**
**Giants**	7	14	10	0	**31**

at Giants Stadium, East Rutherford, New Jersey

- Date: October 11
- Game time: 1:00 p.m. EST/11:00 a.m. MST
- Game weather: 63 °F (17 °C)
- Game attendance: 70,042
- Box Score

Game information

**First quarter**

- PHO – Ernie Jones 72-yard pass from Chris Chandler (Greg Davis kick). Cardinals 7–0.
- NYG – Rodney Hampton 63-yard run (Matt Bahr kick). Tied 7–7.

**Second quarter**

- NYG – Jarrod Bunch 6-yard run (Matt Bahr kick). Giants 14–7.
- NYG – Ed McCaffrey 25-yard pass from Jeff Hostetler (Matt Bahr kick). Giants 21–7.
- PHO – Chris Chandler 1-yard run (Greg Davis kick). Giants 21–14.

**Third quarter**

- NYG – Jeff Hostetler 16-yard run (Matt Bahr kick). Giants 28–14.
- NYG – Matt Bahr 32-yard field goal. Giants 31–14.

**Fourth quarter**

- PHO – Johnny Bailey 7-yard pass from Chris Chandler (Greg Davis kick). Giants 31–21.

**Top passers**

- PHO – Chris Chandler – 16/30, 209 yards, 2 TD. INT
- NYG – Jeff Hostetler – 9/17, 142 yards, TD

**Top rushers**

- PHO – Ivory Lee Brown – 15 rushes, 47 yards
- NYG – Rodney Hampton – 21 rushes, 167 yards, TD

**Top receivers**

- PHO – Ernie Jones – 6 receptions, 125 yards, TD
- NYG – Mark Ingram – 2 receptions, 40 yards

==== Week 7: vs. New Orleans Saints ====
Week 7: New Orleans Saints at Phoenix Cardinals – Game summary

Quarter	1	2	3	4	Total
**Saints**	0	10	13	7	**30**
Cardinals	7	7	0	7	**21**

at Sun Devil Stadium, Tempe, Arizona

- Date: October 18
- Game time: 2:00 p.m. MST
- Game weather: 79 °F (26 °C)
- Game attendance: 27,735
- Box Score

Game information

**First quarter**

- PHO – Johnny Bailey 1-yard run (Greg Davis kick). Cardinals 7–0.
- NO – Morten Andersen 52-yard field goal. Cardinals 7–3.
- PHO – Ernie Jones 7-yard pass from Chris Chandler (Greg Davis kick). Cardinals 14–3.

**Second quarter**

- NO – Eric Martin 11-yard pass from Bobby Hebert (Morten Andersen kick). Cardinals 14–10.

**Third quarter**

- NO – Dalton Hilliard 15-yard pass from Bobby Hebert (kick failed). Saints 16–14.
- NO – Quinn Early 59-yard pass from Bobby Hebert (Morten Andersen). Saints 23–14.

**Fourth quarter**

- NO – Craig Heyward 6-yard run (Morten Andersen kick). Saints 30–14.
- PHO – Anthony Edwards 9-yard pass from Chris Chandler (Greg Davis kick). Saints 30–21

**Top passers**

- NO – Bobby Hebert – 19/26, 355 yards, 3 TD, INT
- PHO – Chris Chandler – 19/30, 218 yards, 2 TD

**Top rushers**

- NO – Craig Heyward – 6 rushes, 30 yards, TD
- PHO – Johnny Bailey – 9 rushes, 42 yards, TD

**Top receivers**

- NO – Eric Martin – 8 receptions, 151 yards, TD
- PHO – Randal Hill – 4 receptions, 60 yards

==== Week 8: at Philadelphia Eagles ====
Week 8: Phoenix Cardinals at Philadelphia Eagles – Game summary

Quarter	1	2	3	4	Total
Cardinals	0	0	0	3	**3**
**Eagles**	0	7	0	0	**7**

at Veterans Stadium, Philadelphia, Pennsylvania

- Date: October 25
- Game time: 1:00 p.m. EST/11:00 a.m. MST
- Game weather: 51 °F (11 °C)
- Game attendance: 64,676
- Box Score

Game information

**First quarter**

- No scoring plays

**Second quarter**

- PHI – Calvin Williams 40-yard pass from Randall Cunningham (Roger Ruzek kick). Eagles 7–0.

**Third quarter**

- No scoring plays

**Fourth quarter**

- PHO – Greg Davis 34-yard field goal. Eagles 7–3.

**Top passers**

- PHO – Chris Chandler – 8/16, 118 yards, INT
- PHI – Randall Cunningham – 9/20, 121 yards, TD, INT

**Top rushers**

- PHO – Johnny Bailey – 14 rushes, 55 yards
- PHI – Herschel Walker – 20 rushes, 112 yards

**Top receivers**

- PHO – Randal Hill – 5 receptions, 76 yards
- PHI – Calvin Williams – 3 receptions, 65 yards, TD

==== Week 9: vs. San Francisco 49ers ====
Week 9: San Francisco 49ers at Phoenix Cardinals – Game summary

Quarter	1	2	3	4	Total
49ers	0	0	7	7	**14**
**Cardinals**	0	10	14	0	**24**

at Sun Devil Stadium, Tempe, Arizona

- Date: November 1
- Game time: 2:00 p.m. MST
- Game weather: 68 °F (20 °C)
- Game attendance: 47,642
- Box Score

Game information

**First quarter**

- No scoring plays

**Second quarter**

- PHO – Randal Hill 4-yard pass from Chris Chandler (Greg Davis kick). Cardinals 7–0.
- PHO – Greg Davis 33-yard field goal. Cardinals 10–0.

**Third quarter**

- PHO – Randal Hill 23-yard pass from Chris Chandler (Greg Davis kick). Cardinals 17–0.
- SF – Mike Sherrard 39-yard fumble return (Mike Cofer kick). Cardinals 17–7.
- PHO – Ricky Proehl 22-yard pass from Chris Chandler (Greg Davis kick). Cardinals 24–7.

**Fourth quarter**

- SF – Ricky Watters 4-yard run (Mike Cofer kick). Cardinals 24–14.

**Top passers**

- SF – Steve Bono – 17/24, 222 yards, INT
- PHO – Chris Chandler – 19/33, 197 yards, 3 TD, INT

**Top rushers**

- SF – Ricky Watters – 7 rushes, 36 yards, TD
- PHO – Johnny Johnson – 26 rushes, 102 yards

**Top receivers**

- SF – Jerry Rice – 6 receptions, 87 yards
- PHO – Randal Hill – 6 receptions, 92 yards, 2 TD

==== Week 10: at Los Angeles Rams ====
Week 10: Phoenix Cardinals at Los Angeles Rams – Game summary

Quarter	1	2	3	4	Total
**Cardinals**	3	0	10	7	**20**
Rams	0	7	0	7	**14**

at Anaheim Stadium, Anaheim, California

- Date: November 8
- Game time: 1:00 p.m. PST/2:00 p.m. MST
- Game weather: 64 °F (18 °C)
- Game attendance: 40,788
- Box Score

Game information

**First quarter**

- PHO – Greg Davis 21-yard field goal. Cardinals 3–0.

**Second quarter**

- LA – Henry Ellard 33-yard pass from Jim Everett (Tony Zendejas kick). Rams 7–3.

**Third quarter**

- PHO – Greg Davis 31-yard field goal. Rams 7–6.
- PHO – Johnny Johnson 6-yard run (Greg Davis kick). Cardinals 13–7.

**Fourth quarter**

- LA – Cleveland Gary 1-yard run (Tony Zendejas kick). Rams 14–13.
- PHO – Johnny Johnson 10-yard run (Greg Davis kick). Cardinals 20–14.

**Top passers**

- PHO – Chris Chandler – 21/30, 224 yards
- LA – Jim Everett – 21/32, 248 yards, TD, INT

**Top rushers**

- PHO – Johnny Johnson – 24 rushes, 91 yards, 2 TD
- LA – Cleveland Gary – 17 rushes, 55 yards, TD

**Top receivers**

- PHO – Ricky Proehl – 9 receptions, 126 yards
- LA – Aaron Cox – 5 receptions, 74 yards

==== Week 11: at Atlanta Falcons ====
Week 11: Phoenix Cardinals at Atlanta Falcons – Game summary

Quarter	1	2	3	4	Total
Cardinals	0	10	0	7	**17**
**Falcons**	7	3	0	10	**20**

at Georgia Dome, Atlanta, Georgia

- Date: November 15
- Game time: 1:00 p.m. EST/11:00 a.m. MST
- Game weather: None (Indoor stadium)
- Game attendance: 58,477
- Box Score

Game information

**First quarter**

- ATL – Andre Rison 30-yard pass from Billy Joe Tolliver (Norm Johnson kick). Falcons 7–0.

**Second quarter**

- ATL – Norm Johnson 27-yard field goal. Falcons 10–0.
- PHO – John Jackson 5-yard pass from Chris Chandler (Greg Davis kick). Falcons 10–7.
- PHO – Greg Davis 49-yard field goal. Tied 10–10.

**Third quarter**

- No scoring plays

**Fourth quarter**

- ATL – Andre Rison 7-yard pass from Billy Joe Tolliver (Norm Johnson kick). Falcons 17–10.
- PHO – Robert Massey 46-yard interception return (Greg Davis kick). Tied 17–17.
- ATL – Norm Johnson 35-yard field goal. Falcons 20–17.

**Top passers**

- PHO – Chris Chandler – 19/34, 261 yards, TD, 2 INT
- ATL – Billy Joe Tolliver – 16/24, 209 yards, 2 TD, INT

**Top rushers**

- PHO – Johnny Johnson – 12 rushes, 33 yards
- ATL – Steve Broussard – 16 rushes, 87 yards

**Top receivers**

- PHO – Randal Hill – 4 receptions, 91 yards
- ATL – Andre Rison – 7 receptions, 87 yards, 2 TD

==== Week 12: vs. Dallas Cowboys ====
Week 12: Dallas Cowboys at Phoenix Cardinals – Game summary

Quarter	1	2	3	4	Total
**Cowboys**	0	10	6	0	**16**
Cardinals	7	0	0	3	**10**

at Sun Devil Stadium, Tempe, Arizona

- Date: November 22
- Game time: 2:00 p.m. MST
- Game weather: 56 °F (13 °C)
- Game attendance: 72,439
- Box Score

Game information

**First quarter**

- PHO – Larry Centers 2-yard pass from Chris Chandler (Greg Davis kick). Cardinals 7–0.

**Second quarter**

- DAL – Lin Elliott 28-yard field goal. Cardinals 10–3.
- DAL – Jay Novacek 7-yard pass from Troy Aikman (Lin Elliott kick). Cowboys 10–7.

**Third quarter**

- DAL – Alvin Harper 37-yard pass from Troy Aikman (kick failed). Cowboys 16–7.

**Fourth quarter**

- PHO – Greg Davis 20-yard field goal. Cowboys 16–10.

**Top passers**

- DAL – Troy Aikman – 25/36, 237 yards, 2 TD, INT
- PHO – Timm Rosenbach – 10/17, 80 yards

**Top rushers**

- DAL – Emmitt Smith – 23 rushes, 84 yards
- PHO – Johnny Johnson – 12 rushes, 45 yards

**Top receivers**

- DAL – Alvin Harper – 5 receptions, 88 yards, TD
- PHO – Johnny Bailey – 3 receptions, 34 yards

==== Week 13: at Washington Redskins ====
Week 13: Phoenix Cardinals at Washington Redskins – Game summary

Quarter	1	2	3	4	Total
Cardinals	3	0	0	0	**3**
**Redskins**	14	6	7	14	**41**

at Robert F. Kennedy Memorial Stadium, Washington, District of Columbia

- Date: November 29
- Game time: 1:00 p.m. EST/11:00 a.m. MST
- Game weather: 44 °F (7 °C)
- Game attendance: 53,541
- Box Score

Game information

**First quarter**

- PHO – Greg Davis 42-yard field goal. Cardinals 3–0.
- WAS – Ricky Sanders 13-yard pass from Mark Rypien (Chip Lohmiller kick). Redskins 7–3.
- WAS – Brad Edwards 53-yard interception return (Chip Lohmiller kick). Redskins 14–3.

**Second quarter**

- WAS – Chip Lohmiller 32-yard field goal. Redskins 17–3.
- WAS – Chip Lohmiller 18-yard field goal. Redskins 20–3.

**Third quarter**

- WAS – Earnest Byner 3-yard run (Chip Lohmiller kick). Redskins 27–3.

**Fourth quarter**

- WAS – Gary Clark 31-yard pass from Mark Rypien (Chip Lohmiller kick). Redskins 34–3.
- WAS – Art Monk 10-yard pass from Cary Conklin (Chip Lohmiller kick). Redskins 41–3.

**Top passers**

- PHO – Timm Rosenbach – 19/34, 262 yards, 4 INT
- WAS – Mark Rypien – 14/25, 175 yards, 2 TD, 2 INT

**Top rushers**

- PHO – Ivory Lee Brown – 16 rushes, 50 yards
- WAS – Earnest Byner – 16 rushes, 62 yards, TD

**Top receivers**

- PHO – Ricky Proehl – 7 receptions, 104 yards
- WAS – Gary Clark – 4 receptions, 65 yards, TD

==== Week 14: vs. San Diego Chargers ====
Week 14: San Diego Chargers at Phoenix Cardinals – Game summary

Quarter	1	2	3	4	Total
**Chargers**	0	10	7	10	**27**
Cardinals	14	0	7	0	**21**

at Sun Devil Stadium, Tempe, Arizona

- Date: December 6
- Game time: 2:00 p.m. MST
- Game weather: 52 °F (11 °C)
- Game attendance: 26,880
- Box Score

Game information

**First quarter**

- PHO – Ernie Jones 4-yard pass from Chris Chandler (Greg Davis kick). Cardinals 7–0.
- PHO – Johnny Johnson 6-yard run (Greg Davis kick) Cardinals 14–0.

**Second quarter**

- SD – Anthony Miller 23-yard pass from Stan Humphries (John Carney kick). Cardinals 14–7.
- SD – John Carney 50-yard field goal. Cardinals 14–10.

**Third quarter**

- PHO – Ricky Proehl 63-yard pass from Chris Chandler (Greg Davis). Cardinals 21–10.
- SD – Eric Bieniemy 5-yard run (John Carney kick) Cardinals 21–17.

**Fourth quarter**

- SD – Ronnie Harmon 1-yard run (John Carney kick) Chargers 24–21.
- SD – John Carney 43-yard field goal. Chargers 27–21.

**Top passers**

- SD – Stan Humphries – 20/32, 275 yards, TD, INT
- PHO – Chris Chandler – 20/35, 251 yards, 2 TD, 2 INT

**Top rushers**

- SD – Eric Bieniemy – 9 rushes, 24 yards, TD
- PHO – Johnny Johnson – 15 rushes, 48 yards, TD

**Top receivers**

- SD – Nate Lewis – 4 receptions, 77 yards
- PHO – Ricky Proehl – 6 receptions, 112 yards, TD

==== Week 15: vs. New York Giants ====
Week 15: New York Giants at Phoenix Cardinals – Game summary

Quarter	1	2	3	4	Total
Giants	0	0	0	0	**0**
**Cardinals**	0	9	3	7	**19**

at Sun Devil Stadium, Tempe, Arizona

- Date: December 12
- Game time: 2:00 p.m. MST
- Game weather: 56 °F (13 °C)
- Game attendance: 28,452
- Box Score

Game information

**First quarter**

- No scoring plays

**Second quarter**

- PHO – Team safety. Cardinals 2–0.
- PHO – Johnny Johnson 5-yard run (Greg Davis kick) Cardinals 9–0.

**Third quarter**

- PHO – Greg Davis 26-yard field goal. Cardinals 12–0.

**Fourth quarter**

- PHO – Johnny Johnson 42-yard run (Greg Davis kick) Cardinals 19–0.

**Top passers**

- NYG – Kent Graham – 7/21, 54 yards, 2 INT
- PHO – Chris Chandler – 12/18, 130 yards

**Top rushers**

- NYG – Rodney Hampton – 12 rushes, 51 yards
- PHO – Johnny Johnson – 36 rushes, 156 yards, 2 TD

**Top receivers**

- NYG – Chris Calloway – 3 receptions, 33 yards
- PHO – Randal Hill – 4 receptions, 63 yards

==== Week 16: at Indianapolis Colts ====
Week 16: Phoenix Cardinals at Indianapolis Colts – Game summary

Quarter	1	2	3	4	Total
Cardinals	7	3	0	3	**13**
**Colts**	0	3	7	6	**16**

at Hoosier Dome, Indianapolis, Indiana

- Date: December 20
- Game time: 1:00 p.m. EST/11:00 a.m. MST
- Game weather: None (Indoor stadium)
- Game attendance: 46,763
- Box Score

Game information

**First quarter**

- PHO – Johnny Johnson 10-yard run (Greg Davis kick) Cardinals 7–0.

**Second quarter**

- PHO – Greg Davis 28-yard field goal. Cardinals 10–0.
- IND – Dean Biasucci 26-yard field goal. Cardinals 10–3.

**Third quarter**

- IND – Anthony Johnson 57-yard pass from Jeff George (Dean Biasucci kick). Tied 10–10.

**Fourth quarter**

- IND – Dean Biasucci 28-yard field goal. Colts 13–10.
- PHO – Greg Davis 48-yard field goal. Tied 13–13.
- IND – Dean Biasucci 42-yard field goal. Colts 16–13.

**Top passers**

- PHO – Chris Chandler – 11/25, 131 yards, 3 INT
- IND – Jeff George – 25/41, 328 yards, TD, INT

**Top rushers**

- PHO – Johnny Johnson – 28 rushes, 146 yards, TD
- IND – Anthony Johnson – 14 rushes, 41 yards

**Top receivers**

- PHO – Ernie Jones – 5 receptions, 70 yards
- IND – Jessie Hester – 8 receptions, 97 yards

==== Week 17: vs. Tampa Bay Buccaneers ====
Week 17: Tampa Bay Buccaneers at Phoenix Cardinals – Game summary

Quarter	1	2	3	4	Total
**Buccaneers**	0	7	0	0	**7**
Cardinals	3	0	0	0	**3**

at Sun Devil Stadium, Tempe, Arizona

- Date: December 27
- Game time: 2:00 p.m. MST
- Game weather: 56 °F (13 °C)
- Game attendance: 29,645
- Box Score

Game information

**First quarter**

- PHO – Greg Davis 21-yard field goal. Cardinals 3–0.

**Second quarter**

- TB – Mark Carrier 23-yard pass from Vinny Testaverde (Eddie Murray kick). Buccaneers 7–3

**Third quarter**

- No scoring plays

**Fourth quarter**

- No scoring plays

**Top passers**

- TB – Vinny Testaverde – 24/41, 228 yards, TD, INT
- PHO – Chris Chandler – 23/43, 234 yards, 3 INT

**Top rushers**

- TB – Reggie Cobb – 11 rushes, 11 yards
- PHO – Johnny Johnson – 20 rushes, 91 yards

**Top receivers**

- TB – Mark Carrier – 7 receptions, 88 yards, TD
- PHO – Larry Centers – 7 receptions, 87 yards

=== Standings ===
NFC East
	W	L	T	PCT	DIV	CONF	PF	PA	STK
^{(2)} Dallas Cowboys	13	3	0	.813	6–2	9–3	409	243	W2
^{(5)} Philadelphia Eagles	11	5	0	.688	6–2	8–4	354	245	W4
^{(6)} Washington Redskins	9	7	0	.563	4–4	7–5	300	255	L2
New York Giants	6	10	0	.375	2–6	4–8	306	367	L1
Phoenix Cardinals	4	12	0	.250	2–6	4–10	243	332	L2
