= 1991 Phoenix Cardinals season =

NFL team season

- Owner: Bill Bidwill
- General manager: Larry Wilson
- Head coach: Joe Bugel
- Offensive coordinator: Jerry Rhome
- Defensive coordinator: Fritz Shurmur
- Home stadium: Sun Devil Stadium

Results
- Record: 4–12
- Division place: 5th NFC East
- Playoffs: Did not qualify
- Pro Bowlers: None

The 1991 Phoenix Cardinals season was the 72nd season the team was in the National Football League (NFL). The team failed to improve on their previous output of 5–11, winning only four games. After beginning the season 2–0, the Cardinals suffered a tough schedule and lost their last eight matches to finish 4–12. This was the ninth consecutive season the Cardinals failed to qualify to the playoffs.

The Cardinals’ 196 points scored is the lowest total in franchise history for a 16-game season.

== Offseason ==
=== NFL draft ===
1991 Phoenix Cardinals draft
Round	Pick	Player	Position	College	Notes
1	6	Eric Swann *	Defensive tackle	Wake Technical CC	
2	32	Mike Jones	Defensive end	North Carolina State	
3	59	Aeneas Williams * ^{†}	Cornerback	Southern	
4	86	Dexter Davis	Cornerback	Clemson	
5	117	Vince Hammond	Defensive tackle	Clemson	
6	144	Eduardo Vega	Offensive tackle	Memphis	
7	171	Ivory Lee Brown	Running back	Arkansas–Pine Bluff	
8	198	Greg Amsler	Running back	Tennessee	
8	204	Jerry Evans	Tight end	Toledo	
8	209	Scott Evans	Defensive end	Oklahoma	
10	255	Herbie Anderson	Defensive back	Texas A&I	
11	282	Nathan LaDuke	Defensive back	Arizona State	
12	309	Jeff Bridewell	Quarterback	UC Davis	
Made roster † Pro Football Hall of Fame * Made at least one Pro Bowl during career

=== Undrafted free agents ===
1991 undrafted free agents of note
Player	Position	College
Donn Grimm	Linebacker	Notre Dame

== Personnel ==
=== Staff ===
1991 Phoenix Cardinals staff
Front office: President – Bill Bidwill; Vice president and general manager – Larry Wilson; Director of pro personnel – Erik Widmark; Director of player personnel – George Boone; Head coaches: Head coach – Joe Bugel; Offensive coaches: Offensive coordinator – Jerry Rhome; Running backs – Bobby Hammond; Receivers – Ted Plumb; Offensive line – Tom Lovat	Defensive coaches: Defensive coordinator – Fritz Shurmur; Defensive line – Ted Cottrell; Inside linebackers/quality control – Mike Murphy; Outside linebackers – Joe Pascale; Defensive secondary – Jim Johnson; Special teams coaches: Special teams – Pete Rodriguez; Strength and conditioning: Strength and conditioning – Bob Rogucki

=== Roster ===
1991 Phoenix Cardinals roster
Quarterbacks (QB): 17 Chris Chandler; 10 Stan Gelbaugh; 19 Tom Tupa; Running backs (RB): 37 Larry Centers FB; 39 Johnny Johnson; 34 Anthony Thompson; 24 Ron Wolfley FB; Wide receivers (WR): 81 Anthony Edwards; 81 Randal Hill; 80 John Jackson; 86 Ernie Jones; 87 Ricky Proehl; Tight ends (TE): 85 Tim Jorden; 89 Walter Reeves	Offensive linemen (OL): 57 Kani Kauahi C; 51 Bill Lewis C; 63 Tootie Robbins RT; 67 Luis Sharpe LT; 61 Lance Smith G; 69 Vernice Smith G; 60 Willie Williams LT; 68 Joe Wolf G; Defensive linemen (DL): 94 Jeff Faulkner DE; 75 Mike Jones DT; 76 Craig Patterson DE; 98 Eric Swann DT; 66 Jim Wahler NT; 78 Chris Williams NT	Linebackers (LB): 54 David Braxton OLB; 93 Sidney Coleman ILB; 56 Ken Harvey OLB; 58 Eric Hill ILB; 97 Steve Hyche OLB; 55 Jock Jones ILB; 50 Freddie Joe Nunn OLB; 90 Tyronne Stowe LB; Defensive backs (DB): 48 Dexter Davis CB; 22 Dave Duerson SS; 31 Richard Fain CB; 42 Steve Lofton CB; 29 Lorenzo Lynch CB; 40 Robert Massey CB; 27 Jay Taylor CB; 35 Aeneas Williams CB; 38 Mike Zordich FS; Special teams (ST): 16 Rich Camarillo P; 5 Greg Davis K	Practice squad: 25 Eddie Brown WR; 33 Ivory Lee Brown RB; 71 Mike Nord T; 52 Willie Wright LB; 47 active, 5 inactive, 4 practice squad Reserve: 45 Greg Amsler RB (IR); 53 Garth Jax LB (IR); 46 Tim McDonald S (IR); 3 Timm Rosenbach QB (IR); 23 Marcus Turner S (IR); Rookies in italics

== Preseason ==
Week	Date	Opponent	Result	Record	Venue	Attendance
1	August 3	at Seattle Seahawks	W 31–13	1–0	Kingdome	49,448
2	August 11	at Chicago Bears	W 12–10	2–0	Soldier Field	55,513
3	August 17	New England Patriots	W 46–0	3–0	Sun Devil Stadium	51,070
4	August 23	Denver Broncos	W 34–10	4–0	Sun Devil Stadium	38,372

== Regular season ==
=== Schedule ===
The 1991 Cardinals suffered from a very tough schedule playing in a powerful NFC East that provided the first four Super Bowl winners of the 1990s, and seven of ten between 1986 and 1995. Football statistics site Football Outsiders calculated that the 1991 Cardinals played the second-toughest schedule (Note: The toughest schedule between 1989 and 2013 according to Football Outsiders was played by the 2004 Cleveland Browns.) based on strength of opponent of any NFL team between 1989 and 2013, although Pro Football Reference argues that the 1991 Cardinals suffered the ninth toughest non-strike schedule since 1971. (Note: Tougher schedules according to Pro Football Reference in non-strike seasons since 1971 were suffered by, in descending order of toughness, the 2010 Buffalo Bills, the 1975 Cleveland Browns and 1975 New York Jets (equal), the 2009 Tampa Bay Buccaneers, the 2010 Miami Dolphins, the 1979 Cincinnati Bengals, the 1977 Kansas City Chiefs and the 1973 San Francisco 49ers.) The Cardinals played just two games against opponents with losing records – both amongst their first five games and both won – whilst ten opponents including all their last five finished 10–6 or better.

Week	Date	Opponent	Result	Record	Venue	Attendance	Recap
1	September 1	at Los Angeles Rams	**W** 24–14	1–0	Anaheim Stadium	47,069	Recap
2	September 8	at **Philadelphia Eagles**	**W** 26–10	2–0	Veterans Stadium	63,818	Recap
3	September 15	at **Washington Redskins**	**L** 0–34	2–1	RFK Stadium	54,662	Recap
4	September 22	**Dallas Cowboys**	**L** 9–17	2–2	Sun Devil Stadium	68,814	Recap
5	September 29	New England Patriots	**W** 24–10	3–2	Sun Devil Stadium	26,043	Recap
6	October 6	at **New York Giants**	**L** 9–20	3–3	Giants Stadium	75,891	Recap
7	October 13	at Minnesota Vikings	**L** 7–34	3–4	Hubert H. Humphrey Metrodome	51,209	Recap
8	October 20	Atlanta Falcons	**W** 16–10	4–4	Sun Devil Stadium	29,804	Recap
9	October 27	Minnesota Vikings	**L** 0–28	4–5	Sun Devil Stadium	45,447	Recap
10	November 3	at **Dallas Cowboys**	**L** 7–27	4–6	Texas Stadium	61,190	Recap
11	November 10	**New York Giants**	**L** 14–21	4–7	Sun Devil Stadium	50,048	Recap
12	November 17	at San Francisco 49ers	**L** 10–14	4–8	Candlestick Park	50,180	Recap
13	November 24	**Philadelphia Eagles**	**L** 14–34	4–9	Sun Devil Stadium	37,307	Recap
14	Bye						
15	December 8	**Washington Redskins**	**L** 14–20	4–10	Sun Devil Stadium	48,373	Recap
16	December 15	at Denver Broncos	**L** 19–24	4–11	Mile High Stadium	74,098	Recap
17	December 22	New Orleans Saints	**L** 3–27	4–12	Sun Devil Stadium	30,928	Recap
Note: Intra-division opponents are in **bold** text.

=== Game summaries ===
==== Week 1: at Los Angeles Rams ====
Week 1: Phoenix Cardinals at Los Angeles Rams – Game summary

Quarter	1	2	3	4	Total
**Cardinals**	14	7	0	3	**24**
Rams	0	7	7	0	**14**

at Anaheim Stadium, Anaheim, California

- Date: September 1
- Game time: 1:00 p.m. PST/2:00 p.m. MST
- Game weather: 67 °F (19 °C)
- Game attendance: 47,069
- Box Score

Game information

**First quarter**

- PHO – Eric Hill 85-yard fumble return (Greg Davis kick). Cardinals 7–0.
- PHO – Ernie Jones 28-yard pass from Tom Tupa (Greg Davis kick). Cardinals 14–0.

**Second quarter**

- LA – Robert Delpino 1-yard run (Tony Zendejas kick). Cardinals 14–7.
- PHO – Tom Tupa 1-yard run (Greg Davis kick). Cardinals 21–7.

**Third quarter**

- LA – Robert Delpino 1-yard run (Tony Zendejas kick). Cardinals 21–14.

**Fourth quarter**

- PHO – Greg Davis 32-yard field goal. Cardinals 24–14.

**Top passers**

- PHO – Tom Tupa – 10/18, 124 yards, TD
- LA – Jim Everett – 25/35, 290 yards, 2 INT

**Top rushers**

- PHO – Anthony Thompson – 29 rushes, 60 yards
- LA – Robert Delpino – 15 rushes, 81 yards, 2 TD

**Top receivers**

- PHO – Ricky Proehl – 5 receptions, 69 yards
- LA – Henry Ellard – 7 receptions, 116 yards

==== Week 2: at Philadelphia Eagles ====
Week 2: Phoenix Cardinals at Philadelphia Eagles – Game summary

Quarter	1	2	3	4	Total
**Cardinals**	13	3	3	7	**26**
Eagles	0	10	0	0	**10**

at Veterans Stadium, Philadelphia, Pennsylvania

- Date: September 8
- Game time: 1:00 p.m. PST/2:00 p.m. MST
- Game weather: 76 °F (24 °C)
- Game attendance: 63,818
- Box Score

Game information

**First quarter**

- PHO – Greg Davis 52-yard field goal. Cardinals 3–0.
- PHO – Johnny Johnson 51-yard pass from Tom Tupa (Greg Davis kick). Cardinals 10–0.
- PHO – Greg Davis 28-yard field goal. Cardinals 13–0.

**Second quarter**

- PHO – Greg Davis 22-yard field goal. Cardinals 16–0.
- PHI – Thomas Sanders 3-yard run (Roger Ruzek kick). Cardinals 16–7.
- PHI – Roger Ruzek 47-yard field goal. Cardinals 16–10.

**Third quarter**

- PHO – Greg Davis 42-yard field goal. Cardinals 19–10.

**Fourth quarter**

- PHO – Rod Saddler 7-yard fumble return (Greg Davis kick). Cardinals 26–10.

**Top passers**

- PHO – Tom Tupa – 6/19, 218 yards, TD, INT
- PHI – Jim McMahon – 19/34, 173 yards

**Top rushers**

- PHO – Johnny Johnson – 19 rushes, 54 yards
- PHI – Thomas Sanders – 15 rushes, 43 yards

**Top receivers**

- PHO – Ricky Proehl – 2 receptions, 75 yards
- PHI – Fred Barnett – 6 receptions, 67 yards

==== Week 3: at Washington Redskins ====
Week 3: Phoenix Cardinals at Washington Redskins – Game summary

Quarter	1	2	3	4	Total
Cardinals	0	0	0	0	**0**
**Redskins**	7	7	14	6	**34**

at Robert F. Kennedy Memorial Stadium, Washington, District of Columbia

- Date: September 15
- Game time: 1:00 p.m. EST/11:00 a.m. MST
- Game weather: 76 °F (24 °C)
- Game attendance: 54,662
- Box Score

Game information

**First quarter**

- WAS – Earnest Byner 2-yard run (Chip Lohmiller kick). Redskins 7–0.

**Second quarter**

- WAS – Ricky Sanders 10-yard run (Chip Lohmiller kick). Redskins 14–0.

**Third quarter**

- WAS – Gary Clark 28-yard pass from Mark Rypien (Chip Lohmiller kick). Redskins 21–0.
- WAS – Wilber Marshall 55-yard interception return (Chip Lohmiller kick). Redskins 28–0.

**Fourth quarter**

- WAS – Chip Lohmiller 30-yard field goal. Redskins 31–0.
- WAS – Chip Lohmiller 48-yard field goal. Redskins 34–0.

**Top passers**

- PHO – Tom Tupa – 13/24, 120 yards, 3 INT
- WAS – Mark Rypien – 15/23, 181 yards, TD

**Top rushers**

- PHO – Johnny Johnson – 8 rushes, 27 yards
- WAS – Earnest Byner – 23 rushes, 109 yards, TD

**Top receivers**

- PHO – Tim Jorden – 5 receptions, 36 yards
- WAS – Gary Clark – 5 receptions, 72 yards, TD

==== Week 4: vs. Dallas Cowboys ====
Week 4: Dallas Cowboys at Phoenix Cardinals – Game summary

Quarter	1	2	3	4	Total
**Cowboys**	14	0	0	3	**17**
Cardinals	0	6	0	3	**9**

at Sun Devil Stadium, Tempe, Arizona

- Date: September 22
- Game time: 8:00 p.m. MST
- Game weather: 86 °F (30 °C)
- Game attendance: 68,814
- Box Score

Game information

**First quarter**

- DAL – Emmitt Smith 60-yard run (Ken Willis kick). Cowboys 7–0.
- DAL – Emmitt Smith 60-yard run (Ken Willis kick). Cowboys 14–0.

**Second quarter**

- PHO – Greg Davis 32-yard field goal. Cowboys 14–3.
- PHO – Greg Davis 32-yard field goal. Cowboys 14–6.

**Third quarter**

- No scoring plays

**Fourth quarter**

- PHO – Greg Davis 29-yard field goal. Cowboys 14–9.
- DAL – Ken Willis 41-yard field goal. Cowboys 17–9.

**Top passers**

- DAL – Troy Aikman – 12/20, 150 yards
- PHO – Tom Tupa – 24/38, 242 yards

**Top rushers**

- DAL – Emmitt Smith – 23 rushes, 182 yards, 2 TD
- PHO – Johnny Johnson – 24 rushes, 92 yards

**Top receivers**

- DAL – Michael Irvin – 3 receptions, 68 yards
- PHO – Ernie Jones – 8 receptions, 92 yards

==== Week 5: vs. New England Patriots ====
Week 5: New England Patriots at Phoenix Cardinals – Game summary

Quarter	1	2	3	4	Total
Patriots	0	7	0	3	**10**
**Cardinals**	0	14	0	10	**24**

at Sun Devil Stadium, Tempe, Arizona

- Date: September 29
- Game time: 2:00 p.m. MST
- Game weather: 87 °F (31 °C)
- Game attendance: 26,043
- Box Score

Game information

**First quarter**

- No scoring plays

**Second quarter**

- PHO – Ernie Jones 17-yard pass from Tom Tupa (Greg Davis kick). Cardinals 7–0.
- NE – Jon Vaughn 99-yard kickoff return (Jason Staurovsky kick). Tied 7–7.
- PHO – Johnny Johnson 15-yard pass from Tom Tupa (Greg Davis kick). Cardinals 14–7.

**Third quarter**

- No scoring plays

**Fourth quarter**

- NE – Jason Staurovsky 39-yard field goal. Cardinals 14–10.
- PHO – Ricky Proehl 62-yard pass from Tom Tupa (Greg Davis kick). Cardinals 21–10.
- PHO – Greg Davis 47-yard field goal. Cardinals 24–10.

**Top passers**

- NE – Hugh Millen – 12/21, 115 yards
- PHO – Tom Tupa – 17/28, 312 yards, 3 TD, INT

**Top rushers**

- NE – Jon Vaughn – 7 rushes, 61 yards
- PHO – Anthony Thompson – 26 rushes, 98 yards

**Top receivers**

- NE – Marv Cook – 6 receptions, 42 yards
- PHO – Ernie Jones – 8 receptions, 145 yards, TD

==== Week 6: at New York Giants ====
Week 6: Phoenix Cardinals at New York Giants – Game summary

Quarter	1	2	3	4	Total
Cardinals	3	0	6	0	**9**
**Giants**	14	3	0	3	**20**

at Giants Stadium, East Rutherford, New Jersey

- Date: October 6
- Game time: 2:00 p.m. EST/12:00 p.m. MST
- Game weather: 64 °F (18 °C)
- Game attendance: 75,891
- Box Score

Game information

**First quarter**

- NYG – Rodney Hampton 12-yard run (Matt Bahr kick). Giants 7–0.
- PHO – Greg Davis 52-yard field goal. Giants 7–3.
- NYG – Zeke Mowatt 7-yard pass from Jeff Hostetler (Matt Bahr kick). Giants 14–3.

**Second quarter**

- NYG – Matt Bahr 30-yard field goal. Giants 17–3.

**Third quarter**

- PHO – Greg Davis 40-yard field goal. Giants 17–6.
- PHO – Greg Davis 29-yard field goal. Giants 17–9.

**Fourth quarter**

- NYG – Matt Bahr 27-yard field goal. Giants 20–9.

**Top passers**

- PHO – Tom Tupa – 23/40, 230 yards, 2 INT
- NYG – Jeff Hostetler – 14/18, 200 yards, TD

**Top rushers**

- PHO – Johnny Johnson – 14 rushes, 73 yards
- NYG – Rodney Hampton – 22 rushes, 137 yards, TD

**Top receivers**

- PHO – Randal Hill – 6 receptions, 65 yards
- NYG – Odessa Turner – 3 receptions, 46 yards

==== Week 7: at Minnesota Vikings ====
Week 7: Phoenix Cardinals at Minnesota Vikings – Game summary

Quarter	1	2	3	4	Total
Cardinals	0	0	0	7	**7**
**Vikings**	7	13	7	7	**34**

at Hubert H. Humphrey Metrodome, Minneapolis, Minnesota

- Date: October 13
- Game time: 12:00 p.m. CST/11:00 a.m. MST
- Game weather: None (Indoor stadium)
- Game attendance: 51,209
- Box Score

Game information

**First quarter**

- MIN – Cris Carter 42-yard pass from Rich Gannon (Fuad Reveiz kick). Vikings 7–0.

**Second quarter**

- MIN – Herschel Walker 1-yard run (Fuad Reveiz kick). Vikings 14–0.
- MIN – Rich Gannon 18-yard run (kick failed). Vikings 20–0.

**Third quarter**

- MIN – Anthony Carter 3-yard pass from Rich Gannon (Fuad Reveiz kick). Vikings 27–0.

**Fourth quarter**

- MIN – Alfred Anderson 6-yard run (Fuad Reveiz). Vikings 34–0.
- PHO – Anthony Thompson 1-yard run (Greg Davis kick). Vikings 34–7.

**Top passers**

- PHO – Tom Tupa – 21/36, 240 yards
- MIN – Rich Gannon – 23/31, 254 yards, 2 TD

**Top rushers**

- PHO – Tom Tupa – 3 rushes, 22 yards
- MIN – Rich Gannon – 5 rushes, 34 yards, TD

**Top receivers**

- PHO – Ernie Jones – 6 receptions, 67 yards
- MIN – Cris Carter – 6 receptions, 118 yards, TD

==== Week 8: vs. Atlanta Falcons ====
Week 8: Atlanta Falcons at Phoenix Cardinals – Game summary

Quarter	1	2	3	4	Total
Falcons	7	3	0	0	**10**
**Cardinals**	3	0	10	3	**16**

at Sun Devil Stadium, Tempe, Arizona

- Date: October 20
- Game time: 2:00 p.m. MST
- Game weather: 83 °F (28 °C)
- Game attendance: 29,804
- Box Score

Game information

**First quarter**

- PHO – Greg Davis 29-yard field goal. Cardinals 3–0.
- ATL – Mike Pritchard 21-yard pass from Chris Miller (Norm Johnson kick). Falcons 7–3.

**Second quarter**

- ATL – Norm Johnson 29-yard field goal. Falcons 10–3.

**Third quarter**

- PHO – Randal Hill 31-yard pass from Tom Tupa (Greg Davis kick). Tied 10–10.

**Fourth quarter**

- PHO – Greg Davis 51-yard field goal. Cardinals 13–10.
- PHO – Greg Davis 49-yard field goal. Cardinals 16–10.

**Top passers**

- ATL – Chris Miller – 13/35, 220 yards, TD, 4 INT
- PHO – Tom Tupa – 9/23, 139 yards, TD, INT

**Top rushers**

- ATL – Steve Broussard – 7 rushes, 34 yards
- PHO – Johnny Johnson – 25 rushes, 83 yards

**Top receivers**

- ATL – Andre Rison – 5 receptions, 91 yards
- PHO – Randal Hill – 2 receptions, 47 yards, TD

==== Week 9: vs. Minnesota Vikings ====
Week 9: Minnesota Vikings at Phoenix Cardinals – Game summary

Quarter	1	2	3	4	Total
**Vikings**	0	7	7	14	**28**
Cardinals	0	0	0	0	**0**

at Sun Devil Stadium, Tempe, Arizona

- Date: October 27
- Game time: 2:00 p.m. MST
- Game weather: 65 °F (18 °C)
- Game attendance: 45,447
- Box Score

Game information

**First quarter**

- No scoring plays

**Second quarter**

- MIN – Hassan Jones 5-yard pass from Rich Gannon (Fuad Reveiz kick). Vikings 7–0.

**Third quarter**

- MIN – Herschel Walker 16-yard run (Fuad Reveiz kick). Vikings 14–0.

**Fourth quarter**

- MIN – Herschel Walker 1-yard run (Fuad Reveiz kick). Vikings 21–0.
- MIN – Herschel Walker 5-yard run (Fuad Reveiz kick). Vikings 28–0.

**Top passers**

- MIN – Rich Gannon – 17/26, 142 yards, TD, INT
- PHO – Tom Tupa – 12/30, 123 yards, 2 INT

**Top rushers**

- MIN – Herschel Walker – 17 rushes, 79 yards, 3 TD
- PHO – Anthony Thompson – 6 rushes, 26 yards

**Top receivers**

- MIN – Steve Jordan – 5 receptions, 54 yards
- PHO – Ernie Jones – 3 receptions, 53 yards

==== Week 10: at Dallas Cowboys ====
Week 10: Phoenix Cardinals at Dallas Cowboys – Game summary

Quarter	1	2	3	4	Total
Cardinals	0	7	0	0	**7**
**Cowboys**	10	0	7	10	**27**

at Texas Stadium, Irving, Texas

- Date: November 3
- Game time: 12:00 p.m. CST/11:00 a.m. MST
- Game weather: 33 °F (1 °C)
- Game attendance: 61,190
- Box Score

Game information

**First quarter**

- DAL – Ken Willis 36-yard field goal. Cowboys 3–0.

**Second quarter**

- DAL – Emmitt Smith 3-yard run (Ken Willis kick). Cowboys 10–0.
- PHO – Johnny Johnson 1-yard run (Greg Davis kick). Cowboys 10–7.

**Third quarter**

- DAL – Emmitt Smith 1-yard run (Ken Willis kick). Cowboys 17–7.

**Fourth quarter**

- DAL – Ken Willis 27-yard field goal. Cowboys 20–7.
- DAL – Emmitt Smith 3-yard run (Ken Willis kick). Cowboys 27–7.

**Top passers**

- PHO – Tom Tupa – 15/34, 130 yards, 2 INT
- DAL – Troy Aikman – 17/23, 191 yards, 2 INT

**Top rushers**

- PHO – Johnny Johnson – 19 rushes, 89 yards, TD
- DAL – Emmitt Smith – 22 rushes, 62 yards, 3 TD

**Top receivers**

- PHO – Ricky Proehl – 4 receptions, 47 yards
- DAL – Alvin Harper – 3 receptions, 67 yards

==== Week 11: vs. New York Giants ====
Week 11: New York Giants at Phoenix Cardinals – Game summary

Quarter	1	2	3	4	Total
**Giants**	7	7	7	0	**21**
Cardinals	0	7	0	7	**14**

at Sun Devil Stadium, Tempe, Arizona

- Date: November 10
- Game time: 2:00 p.m. MST
- Game weather: 74 °F (23 °C)
- Game attendance: 50,048
- Box Score

Game information

**First quarter**

- NYG – Jeff Hostetler 47-yard run (Raul Allegre kick). Giants 7–0.

**Second quarter**

- NYG – Rodney Hampton 1-yard run (Raul Allegre kick). Giants 14–0.
- PHO – Johnny Johnson 3-yard run (Greg Davis kick). Giants 14–7.

**Third quarter**

- NYG – Jeff Hostetler 4-yard run (Raul Allegre kick). Giants 21–7.

**Fourth quarter**

- PHO – Ricky Proehl 34-yard pass from Stan Gelbaugh (Greg Davis kick). Giants 21–14.

**Top passers**

- NYG – Jeff Hostetler – 12/21, 124 yards
- PHO – Tom Tupa – 15/25, 175 yards, INT

**Top rushers**

- NYG – Rodney Hampton – 24 rushes, 99 yards, TD
- PHO – Johnny Johnson – 14 rushes, 37 yards, TD

**Top receivers**

- NYG – Mark Ingram – 3 receptions, 46 yards
- PHO – Ernie Jones – 5 receptions, 99 yards

==== Week 12: at San Francisco 49ers ====
Week 12: Phoenix Cardinals at San Francisco 49ers – Game summary

Quarter	1	2	3	4	Total
Cardinals	0	0	3	7	**10**
**49ers**	0	7	0	7	**14**

at Candlestick Park, San Francisco, California

- Date: November 17
- Game time: 1:00 p.m. PST/2:00 p.m. MST
- Game weather: 59 °F (15 °C)
- Game attendance: 50,180
- Box Score

Game information

**First quarter**

- No scoring plays

**Second quarter**

- SF – Keith Henderson 2-yard run (Mike Cofer kick). 49ers 7–0.
- PHO – Greg Davis 35-yard field goal. 49ers 7–3.

**Third quarter**

- SF – Tom Rathman 1-yard run (Mike Cofer kick). 49ers 14–3.

**Fourth quarter**

- PHO – Ernie Jones 26-yard pass from Stan Gelbaugh (Greg Davis kick). 49ers 14–10.

**Top passers**

- PHO – Stan Gelbaugh – 14/26, 156 yards, TD
- SF – Steve Bono – 20/35, 187 yards

**Top rushers**

- PHO – Johnny Johnson – 12 rushes, 32 yards
- SF – Keith Henderson – 15 rushes, 51 yards, TD

**Top receivers**

- PHO – Ricky Proehl – 6 receptions, 59 yards
- SF – Brent Jones – 5 receptions, 79 yards

==== Week 13: vs. Philadelphia Eagles ====
Week 13: Philadelphia Eagles at Phoenix Cardinals – Game summary

Quarter	1	2	3	4	Total
**Eagles**	20	0	7	7	**34**
Cardinals	7	7	0	0	**14**

at Sun Devil Stadium, Tempe, Arizona

- Date: November 24
- Game time: 2:00 p.m. MST
- Game weather: 58 °F (14 °C)
- Game attendance: 37,307
- Box Score

Game information

**First quarter**

- PHI – Fred Barnett 18-yard pass from Jim McMahon (Roger Ruzek kick). Eagles 7–0.
- PHI – Seth Joyner 34-yard fumble return (kick failed). Eagles 13–0.
- PHO – Willie Williams 3-yard pass from Stan Gelbaugh (Greg Davis kick). Eagles 13–7.
- PHI – Clyde Simmons 0-yard fumble return (Roger Ruzek kick). Eagles 20–7.

**Second quarter**

- PHO – Lorenzo Lynch 35-yard interception return (Greg Davis kick). Eagles 20–14.

**Third quarter**

- PHI – Keith Jackson 29-yard pass from Jim McMahon (Roger Ruzek kick). Eagles 27–14.

**Fourth quarter**

- PHI – Keith Byars 14-yard run (Roger Ruzek kick). Eagles 34–14.

**Top passers**

- PHI – Jim McMahon – 10/25, 162 yards, 2 TD, 3 INT
- PHO – Stan Gelbaugh – 19/39, 193 yards, TD, 4 INT

**Top rushers**

- PHI – James Joseph – 25 rushes, 85 yards
- PHO – Anthony Thompson – 10 rushes, 35 yards

**Top receivers**

- PHI – Fred Barnett – 4 receptions, 90 yards, TD
- PHO – Randal Hill – 7 receptions, 80 yards

==== Week 15: vs. Washington Redskins ====
Week 15: Washington Redskins at Phoenix Cardinals – Game summary

Quarter	1	2	3	4	Total
**Redskins**	0	0	14	6	**20**
Cardinals	0	14	0	0	**14**

at Sun Devil Stadium, Tempe, Arizona

- Date: December 8
- Game time: 2:00 p.m. MST
- Game weather: 59 °F (15 °C)
- Game attendance: 48,373
- Box Score

Game information

**First quarter**

- No scoring plays

**Second quarter**

- PHO – Johnny Johnson 1-yard run (Greg Davis kick). Cardinals 7–0.
- PHO – Johnny Johnson 3-yard run (Greg Davis kick). Cardinals 14–0.

**Third quarter**

- WAS – Terry Orr 4-yard pass from Mark Rypien (Chip Lohmiller kick). Cardinals 14–7.
- WAS – Ricky Sanders 17-yard pass from Mark Rypien (Chip Lohmiller kick). Tied 14–14.

**Fourth quarter**

- WAS – Chip Lohmiller 42-yard field goal. Redskins 17–14.
- WAS – Chip Lohmiller 27-yard field goal. Redskins 20–14.

**Top passers**

- WAS – Mark Rypien – 22/33, 256 yards, 2 TD
- PHO – Stan Gelbaugh – 11/21, 111 yards, 2 INT

**Top rushers**

- WAS – Earnest Byner – 25 rushes, 116 yards
- PHO – Johnny Johnson – 13 rushes, 48 yards, 2 TD

**Top receivers**

- WAS – Gary Clark – 7 receptions, 99 yards
- PHO – Ernie Jones – 4 receptions, 76 yards

==== Week 16: at Denver Broncos ====
Week 16: Phoenix Cardinals at Denver Broncos – Game summary

Quarter	1	2	3	4	Total
Cardinals	0	3	10	6	**19**
**Broncos**	7	3	7	7	**24**

at Mile High Stadium, Denver, Colorado

- Date: December 15
- Game time: 2:00 p.m. MST
- Game weather: 34 °F (1 °C)
- Game attendance: 74,098
- Box Score

Game information

**First quarter**

- DEN – Shannon Sharpe 3-yard pass from John Elway (David Treadwell kick). Broncos 7–0.

**Second quarter**

- DEN – David Treadwell 18-yard field goal. Broncos 10–0.
- PHO – Greg Davis 33-yard field goal. Broncos 10–3.

**Third quarter**

- PHO – Greg Davis 45-yard field goal. Broncos 10–6.
- DEN – Steve Sewell 8-yard run (David Treadwell kick). Broncos 17–6.
- PHO – Ernie Jones 45-yard pass from Chris Chandler (Greg Davis kick). Broncos 17–13.

**Fourth quarter**

- PHO – Greg Davis 28-yard field goal. Broncos 17–16.
- PHO – Greg Davis 28-yard field goal. Cardinals 19–17.
- DEN – John Elway 4-yard run (David Treadwell kick). Broncos 24–19.

**Top passers**

- PHO – Chris Chandler – 15/32, 194 yards, TD
- DEN – John Elway – 19/33, 245 yards, TD, 3 INT

**Top rushers**

- PHO – Johnny Johnson – 13 rushes, 37 yards
- DEN – Gaston Green – 13 rushes, 50 yards

**Top receivers**

- PHO – Ernie Jones – 4 receptions, 84 yards, TD
- DEN – Vance Johnson – 4 receptions, 58 yards

==== Week 17: vs. New Orleans Saints ====
Week 17: New Orleans Saints at Phoenix Cardinals – Game summary

Quarter	1	2	3	4	Total
**Saints**	0	13	7	7	**27**
Cardinals	3	0	0	0	**3**

at Sun Devil Stadium, Tempe, Arizona

- Date: December 22
- Game time: 2:00 p.m. MST
- Game weather: 55 °F (13 °C)
- Game attendance: 30,928
- Box Score

Game information

**First quarter**

- PHO – Greg Davis 38-yard field goal. Cardinals 3–0.

**Second quarter**

- NO – Morten Andersen 27-yard field goal. Tied 3–3.
- NO – Dalton Hilliard 2-yard run (Morten Andersen kick). Saints 10–3.
- NO – Morten Anderson 39-yard field goal. Saints 13–3.

**Third quarter**

- NO – Buford Jordan 3-yard run (Morten Andersen kick). Saints 20–3.

**Fourth quarter**

- NO – Floyd Turner 19-yard pass from Bobby Hebert (Morten Andersen kick). Saints 27–3.

**Top passers**

- NO – Bobby Hebert – 12/24, 100 yards, TD, INT
- PHO – Stan Gelbaugh – 12/24, 128 yards, 3 INT

**Top rushers**

- NO – Buford Jordan – 4 rushes, 38 yards, TD
- PHO – Anthony Thompson – 7 rushes, 28 yards

**Top receivers**

- NO – Floyd Turner – 4 receptions, 47 yards, TD
- PHO – Randal Hill – 5 receptions, 65 yards

=== Standings ===
NFC East
	W	L	T	PCT	DIV	CONF	PF	PA	STK
^{(1)} Washington Redskins	14	2	0	.875	6–2	10–2	485	224	L1
^{(5)} Dallas Cowboys	11	5	0	.688	5–3	8–4	342	310	W5
Philadelphia Eagles	10	6	0	.625	5–3	6–6	285	244	W1
New York Giants	8	8	0	.500	3–5	5–7	281	297	W1
Phoenix Cardinals	4	12	0	.250	1–7	3–11	196	344	L8
