= Eric Davis (American football) =

American football player (born 1968)

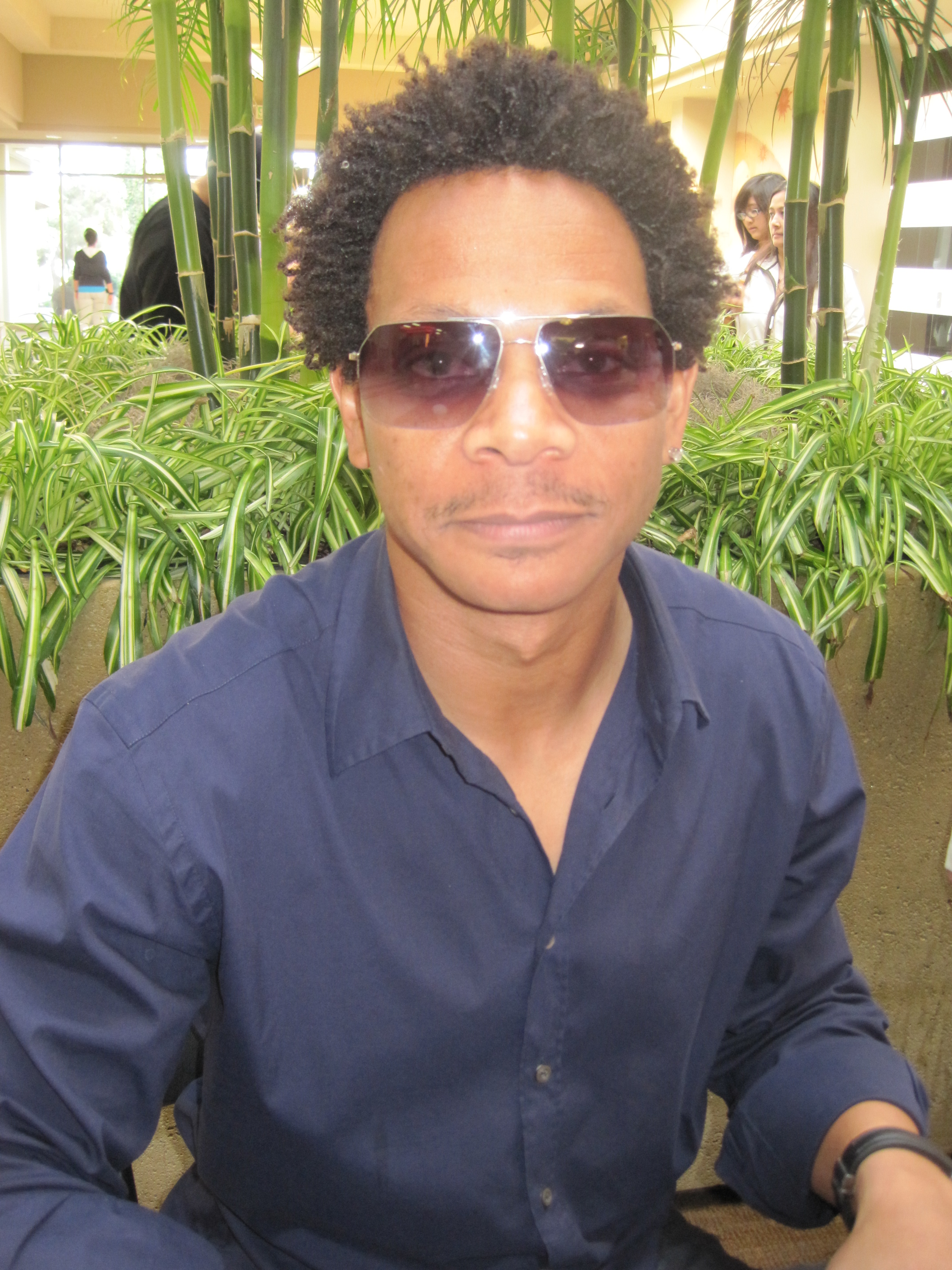
- Davis in January 2010

No. 25, 26
- Position: Cornerback

Personal information
- Born: January 26, 1968 (age 58); Anniston, Alabama, U.S.
- Listed height: 6 ft 0 in (1.83 m)
- Listed weight: 195 lb (88 kg)

Career information
- High school: Anniston (Anniston, Alabama)
- College: Jacksonville State
- NFL draft: 1990: 2nd round, 53rd overall pick

Career history
- San Francisco 49ers (1990–1995); Carolina Panthers (1996–2000); Denver Broncos (2001); Detroit Lions (2002)

Awards and highlights
- Super Bowl champion (XXIX); First-team All-Pro (1995); Second-team All-Pro (1996); 2× Pro Bowl (1995, 1996)

Career NFL statistics
- Tackles: 670
- Sacks: 2.0
- Forced fumbles: 14
- Fumble recoveries: 12
- Interceptions: 38
- Defensive touchdowns: 5
- Stats at Pro Football Reference

Eric Wayne Davis (born January 26, 1968) is an American former professional football player who was a cornerback for 13 seasons in the National Football League (NFL). He played college football for the Jacksonville State Gamecocks. Davis was selected by the San Francisco 49ers in the second round of the 1990 NFL draft. He played in NFL seasons from 1990 to 2002.

In 2008, he was elected to the Division II College Hall of Fame. In 2013, he was inducted into the Alabama Sports Hall of Fame.

== College career ==
Davis played for Jacksonville State, which was at the time a Division II school, from 1986 to 1989. As a senior, he led the team to a 13–1 record, a Gulf South Conference championship, and an appearance in the Division II championship game. He finished 1989 with 51 tackles, 8 pass deflections, and 6 interceptions. He was voted into the school's athletic hall of fame in 1999.

== Professional career ==
=== San Francisco 49ers ===
The San Francisco 49ers selected Davis in the second round (53rd overall) of the 1990 NFL draft. He was the fourth cornerback drafted in 1990 and became the fourth player from Jacksonville State to be selected in the NFL draft since 1967.

==== 1990 season ====
On July 29, 1990, the San Francisco 49ers signed Davis three—year, $950,000 rookie contract that included an initial signing bonus of $250,000. Due to an undisclosed injury, Davis missed the majority of training camp during his rookie year. Head coach George Seifert relegated Davis to a backup role at cornerback to begin the regular season and remained a backup behind the starting tandem of Don Griffin and Darryl Pollard.

On September 10, 1990, Davis made his professional regular season debut in the San Francisco 49ers’ season-opener at the New Orleans Saints and recorded one solo tackle and set a season-high with two pass break-ups during a 13–12 victory. In Week 6, he set a season-high with four solo tackles during a 45–35 victory at the Atlanta Falcons. On December 9, 1990, Davis had one pass break-up and had his first career interception as the 49ers won in overtime 20–17 at the Cincinnati Bengals. He intercepted a pass Boomer Esiason attempted to throw to wide receiver Tim McKee with nine seconds left in the game and sent the game into overtime after a 17–17 tie in regulation. He finished his rookie season with 21 combined tackles (20 solo), five pass deflections, a fumble recovery, and an interception in 16 games and zero starts.

==== 1991 season ====
Entering training camp, Davis was slated to remain a backup cornerback. On August 23, 1991, starting cornerback Darryl Pollard suffered a fractured ankle during a 28–16 victory at the Seattle Seahawks in their final preseason game. Defensive coordinator Bill McPherson held a competition between Davis and Kevin Lewis for the vacant starting role at cornerback. Head coach George Seifert named Davis a starting cornerback to begin the season alongside Don Griffin. On September 2, 1991, Davis earned his first career start in the San Francisco 49ers’ season-opener at the New York Giants and recorded five combined tackles (four solo) during their 14–16 loss. In Week 2, Davis set a season-high with five solo tackles as the 49ers routed the San Diego Chargers 34—14. On September 11, 1991, the San Francisco 49ers officially placed Davis on injured reserve for the rest of the 1991 NFL season due to torn muscles in his left shoulder that required surgery. His second season was limited to two games and two starts with ten combined tackles (nine solo).

==== 1992 season ====
He entered training camp slated as the No. 2 starting cornerback following the departures of Darryl Pollard, Kevin Lewis, and Mark Lee. Head coach George Seifert named Davis and Don Griffin the starting cornerbacks to begin the regular season. In Week 3, Davis set a season-high with nine solo tackles during a 31–14 victory at the New York Jets. On September 27, 1992, Davis recorded five solo tackles, set a season-high with two pass deflections, recovered a fumble, and secured a 16–10 victory at the New Orleans Saints by intercepting a pass attempt by Bobby Herbert with 19 seconds remaining in the game. In Week 7, he made three solo tackles, a pass deflection, and intercepted a pass Chris Miller attempted to throw to wide receiver Michael Haynes as the 49ers routed the Atlanta Falcons 17—56. He started in all 16 games for the first time in his career and recorded 61 combined tackles (58 solo), 12 pass deflections, three interceptions, and made two fumble recoveries.

The San Francisco 49ers finished the 1992 NFL season first in the NFC West with a 14–2 record, clinching a playoff berth and a first round bye. On January 9, 1993, Davis earned hiz first start in a playoff game and recorded four solo tackles, made three pass deflections, and intercepted Mark Rypien's pass attempt to wide receiver Ricky Sanders as the 49ers defeated the defending Super Bowl Champion Washington Redskins 13–20 in the NFC Divisional Round. On January 17, 1993, Davis started in the NFC Championship Game and made seven combined tackles (six solo) and had one pass break-up as the 49ers lost 20–30 to the eventual Super Bowl XXVII Champions the Dallas Cowboys.

==== 1993 season ====
Davis and Don Griffin returned as the starting cornerbacks to begin the regular season. On October 3, 1993, Davis recorded three combined (one solo), set a new career-high with seven pass deflections, and returned an interception for the first touchdown of his career as the 49ers routed the Minnesota Vikings 38—19. His first career pick-six occurred after Davis picked off a pass Jim McMahon threw to wide receiver Anthony Carter and returned it 41—yards for a touchdown in the second quarter. On October 17, 1993, Davis recorded five combined tackles (four solo), made two pass deflections, and recovered a fumble by running back Emmitt Smith and returned it 4—yards for a touchdown during a 17–26 loss at the Dallas Cowboys. In Week 8, he set a season-high with ten combined tackles (nine solo), made two pass deflections, and intercepted a pass Steve Beuerlein threw to wide receiver Anthony Edwards as the 49ers defeated the Phoenix Cardinals 14—28. On December 24, 1993, the San Francisco 49ers re-signed Davis to a two—year, $2.40 million contract extension. The 49ers were re-signing players before the NFL salary cap would officially come into effect. He started in all 16 games and finished the season with 69 combined tackles (63 solo), 27 pass deflections, four interceptions, a forced fumble, a fumble recovery, and two touchdowns.

The San Francisco 49ers finished the 1993 NFL season atop the NFC West with a 10–6 record to clinch a playoff berth and a first round bye. On January 15, 1994, Davis made three solo tackles, two pass deflections, and intercepted Phil Simms' pass attempt to wide receiver Ed McCaffrey as the 49ers routed the New York Giants 44–3 in the NFC Divisional Round. The following week, Davis recorded five combined tackles (four solo) and made a pass deflection during a 21–38 loss at the Dallas Cowboys in the NFC Championship Game.

==== 1994 season ====
On February 17, 1994, the San Francisco 49ers hired Ray Rhodes to takeover as their defensive coordinator after Bill McPherson was promoted to assistant head coach. Head coach George Seifert retained Davis as a starting cornerback and paired him with free agent acquisition Deion Sanders.

On October 23, 1994, Davis recorded two combined tackles (one solo), set a season-high with four pass deflections, and had his lone interception of the season on a pass Trent Dilfer threw to wide receiver Courtney Hawkins as the 49ers defeated the Tampa Bay Buccaneers 16—41. In Week 11, Davis set a season-high with 12 combined tackles (11 solo) and had one pass deflection as the 49ers defeated the Dallas Cowboys 21—14. He started all 16 games in 1994 and finished with a total of 74 combined tackles (68 solo), 23 pass deflections, two forced fumbles, one fumble recovery, and one interception.

The San Francisco 49ers finished the 1994 NFL season first in the NFC West with a 13–3 record. On January 7, 1995, Davis made three solo tackles, one pass break-up, and intercepted a pass Steve Walsh threw to Curtis Conway as the 49ers routed the Chicago Bears 15–44 in the NFC Divisional Round. On January 15, 1995, Davis made eight solo tackles, two pass deflections, two interceptions, ans returnedan interception thrown by Troy Aikman for a 44—yard touchdown as the 49ers defeated the Dallas Cowboys 28–38 in the NFC Championship Game to advance to the Super Bowl. On January 29, 1995, Davis started in Super Bowl XXIX and recorded six solo tackles, made three pass deflections, and intercepted a pass Stan Humphries threw to wide receiver Tony Martin as the 49ers defeated the San Diego Chargers 26—49. Davis earned his first and only Super Bowl ring of his career.

==== 1995 season ====
On February 3, 1995, the San Francisco 49ers hired former New York Jets head coach Pete Carroll as their new defensive coordinator following Ray Rhodes departure to become head coach of the Philadelphia Eagles. Following the departure of Deion Sanders, Davis became the No. 1 starting cornerback and was paired with Marquez Pope.

In Week 3, Davis made seven combined tackles (six solo), one pass deflection, and had the first sack of his career on Drew Bledsoe for an eight-yard loss as the 49ers defeated the New England Patriots 3—28. In Week 10, he set a season-high with ten solo tackles and made three pass deflections during a 7–13 loss to the Carolina Panthers. He was inactive as the 49ers defeated the New York Giants 20–6 in Week 5 after injuring his shoulder and groin. On November 26, 1995, Davis made one solo tackle, one pass deflection, and returned an interception thrown by Chris Miller for an 86—yard touchdown as the 49ers routed the St. Louis Rams 13—41. On December 3, 1995, he recorded one tackle, set a season-high with four pass deflections, and set a season-high with two interceptions on passes by Jim Kelly during a 27–17 win against the Buffalo Bills. He finished the 1995 NFL season with a total of 51 combined tackles (43 solo), 22 pass deflections, three interceptions, two forced fumbles, a fumble recovery, one sack, and scored one touchdown in 15 games and 15 starts. He was voted to the 1996 Pro Bowl, marking the first Pro Bowl selection of his career.

==== 1996 season ====
Following the 1992 NFL season, Davis became an unrestricted free agent and was highly sought after. He visited and met with multiple teams, including the Philadelphia Eagles, Detroit Lions, Denver Broncos, and Carolina Panthers. He also had contract negotiations with the San Francisco 49ers and was offered a four—year, $8 million contract, but declined to accept their offer.

=== Carolina Panthers ===
On February 21, 1996, the Carolina Panthers signed Davis to a four—year, $11.40 million contract that included an initial signing bonus of $3.00 million. The Panthers signed Davis following the departure of Tim McKyer and was slated to takeover as their starting cornerback. Head coach Dom Capers named Davis a starting cornerback to begin the regular season and paired him with Tyrone Poole.

On October 27, 1996, Davis set a season-high with seven solo tackles, set a season-high with three pass deflections, forced a fumble, and intercepted Ty Detmer's pass attempt to wide receiver Irving Fryar as the Panthers lost 9–20 at the Philadelphia Eagles. On November 24, 1996, he made three solo tackles, two pass deflections, a forced fumble, and intercepted a pass attempt by Chris Chandler during a 31–6 victory at the Houston Oilers. In Week 12, Davis tied his season-high of seven solo tackles during a 20–10 win at the St. Louis Rams. On December 8, 1996, Davis made four solo tackles, one pass deflection, and intercepted Steve Young's pass attempt to Terrell Owens to help secure a 30–24 victory against the San Francisco 49ers with 4:35 remaining. He started in all 16 games throughout the season and finished with a total of 60 combined tackles (56 solo), 20 pass deflections, five interceptions, and three forced fumbles. His performance earned him a selection to the 1997 Pro Bowl, marking the second consecutive Pro Bowl selection of his career.

==== 1997 season ====
He returned as the No. 1 starting cornerback to begin the season and started alongside Tyrone Poole under defensive coordinator Vic Fangio. On October 19, 1997, Davis made one tackle, two pass deflections, and set a season-high with two interceptions off pass attempts by Danny Wuerffel during a 13–0 victory at the New Orleans Saints. In Week 9, Davis set a season-high with six solo tackles, made one pass deflection, and intercepted a pass attempt by Tony Graziani during a 12–21 victory against the Atlanta Falcons. He was sidelined for the final two games of the regular season (Weeks 16—17) due to a concussion he suffered after his head collided with the knee of running back Sherman Williams while making a tackle during a 23–13 victory at the Dallas Cowboys in Week 15. He finished the 1997 NFL season with 41 combined tackles (35 solo), 12 pass deflections, and five interceptions in 14 games and 14 starts.

==== 1998 season ====
He retained his role as the No. 1 starting cornerback throughout the 1998 NFL season following the departure of Tyrone Poole. He started alongside Doug Evans, Rod Smith, and Steve Lofton due to numerous injuries. On September 27, 1998, Davis recorded four combined tackles (three solo), set a season-high with three pass deflections, and returned an interception thrown by Brett Favre for a 16—yard touchdown during a 37–30 loss to the Green Bay Packers. On November 1, 1998, Davis made five solo tackles, one pass deflection, and intercepted a pass Billy Joe Tolliver threw to wide receiver Sean Dawkins and returned it for a 56—yard touchdown as the Panthers defeated the New Orleans Saints 17—31. In Week 11, he set a season-high with ten combined tackles (eight solo) during a 9–13 loss to the Miami Dolphins. On December 27, 1998, Davis recorded five solo tackles, made two pass deflections, and secured a 27–19 victory at the Indianapolis Colts by intercepting Peyton Manning's pass attempt to E. G. Green with two minutes remaining in the fourth quarter. He started in all 16 games throughout the 1998 NFL season and finished with 69 combined tackles (63 solo), 19 pass deflections, five interceptions, two touchdowns, and one sack. On December 28, 1998, the Carolina Panthers fired head coach Dom Capers following the conclusion of the 1998 NFL season where they finished with a 4–12 record.

==== 1999 season ====
On January 4, 1999, the Carolina Panthers announced their decision to hire George Seifert to be their new head coach, reuniting Davis and Seifert from their time with the 49ers. The Panthers also hired former 49ers' defensive coach John Marshall to be their defensive coordinator. Davis and Doug Evans were retained as the starting cornerbacks for the 1999 NFL season. On November 21, 1999, Davis made one solo tackle, tied his season-high with three pass deflections, and intercepted a pass attempt by Tim Couch during a 31–17 victory at the Cleveland Browns. In Week 12, he set a season-high with nine combined tackles (eight solo) and made three pass deflections during a 34–28 win against the Atlanta Falcons. In Week 15, he made four solo tackles, one pass deflection, and had one interception after picking off Jeff Garcia's pass to Terrell Owens as the Panthers routed the San Francisco 49ers 41—24. He started in all 16 games in 1999 and finished the season with a total of 76 combined tackles (58 solo), 24 pass deflections, and five interceptions.

==== 2000 season ====
Entering training camp, Davis was slated as the de facto No. 1 starting cornerback although the Panthers selected Rashard Anderson in the first round (23rd overall) of the 2000 NFL draft. The Panthers retained Doug Evans and acquired cornerback Jimmy Hitchcock, developing a top secondary that also included safeties Mike Minter and free agent Eugene Robinson. Head coach George Seifert elected to start Davis and Doug Evans with Jimmy Hitchcock as the primary nickelback. On November 27, 2000, Davis set a season-high with nine combined tackles (six solo), made one pass deflection, and had a key interception in the fourth quarter, picking off Brett Favre's pass to wide receiver Antonio Freeman as the Panthers defeated the Green Bay Packers 14—31. On December 3, 2000, Davis recorded four combined tackles (three solo), set a season-high with three pass deflections, had two forced fumbles, and intercepted Kurt Warner's pass attempt to Isaac Bruce as the Panthers routed the St. Louis Rams 3—16. He started in all 16 games for the third consecutive season and made 73 combined tackles (61 solo), 18 pass deflections, five interceptions, four forced fumbles, and a fumble recovery.

=== Denver Broncos ===
On August 2, 2001, the Denver Broncos signed Davis to a one—year, $600,000 contract at the veteran league minimum that included an initial signing bonus of $100,000. He was reunited with defensive coordinator Ray Rhodes who was previously his defensive coordinator with the San Francisco 49ers.

=== Detroit Lions ===
On June 28, 2002, the Detroit Lions signed Davis to a one—year contract as an unrestricted free agent. The San Francisco 49ers offered a four—year, $8.00 million contract.

=== Denver Broncos ===
On August 2, 2001, the Denver Broncos signed Davis to a one—year, $600,000 contract at the veteran league minimum that included an initial signing bonus of $100,000.

== NFL career statistics ==
=== Regular season ===
Year	Team	Games		Tackles				Interceptions					Fumbles			
Year	Team	GP	GS	Comb	Solo	Ast	Sck	Int	Yds	Avg	Lng	TD	FF	FR	Yds	TD
1990	SF	16	0	21	—	—	0.0	1	13	13.0	13	0	2	1	34	0
1991	SF	2	2	10	—	—	0.0	0	0	0.0	0	0	0	0	0	0
1992	SF	16	16	61	—	—	0.0	3	52	17.3	37	0	0	2	0	0
1993	SF	16	16	69	—	—	0.0	4	45	11.3	41	1	1	1	47	1
1994	SF	16	16	74	68	6	0.0	1	8	8.0	8	0	1	2	0	0
1995	SF	15	15	51	43	8	1.0	3	84	28.0	86	1	2	0	0	0
1996	CAR	16	16	60	56	4	0.0	5	57	11.4	36	0	2	0	0	0
1997	CAR	14	14	41	35	6	0.0	5	25	5.0	17	0	0	1	2	0
1998	CAR	16	16	71	64	7	1.0	5	81	16.2	56	2	0	1	0	0
1999	CAR	16	16	76	58	18	0.0	5	49	9.8	16	0	1	1	0	0
2000	CAR	16	16	73	61	12	0.0	5	14	2.8	8	0	4	1	0	0
2001	DEN	16	0	25	24	1	0.0	0	0	0.0	0	0	1	1	0	0
2002	DET	7	1	38	31	7	0.0	1	14	14.0	14	0	0	1	0	0
Career		188	150	670	440	69	2.0	38	442	11.6	86	4	14	12	83	1

== Broadcasting career ==
In the 2000s, Davis worked as a color analyst for the 49ers during the preseason on KPIX-TV, and also analyzed on Comcast SportsNet Bay Area. In 2011, he was hired as the color analyst for the 49ers radio broadcasts, joining Ted Robinson in the booth, and replacing Gary Plummer. He was also the cohost of "The Drive with Tierney and Davis" on 95.7 The Game in San Francisco.

In 2012, he became a cohost/analyst for a new weekday morning show on NFL Network titled NFL AM. He continued to serve as the 49ers' radio analyst through the 2013 season.

In 2015, he became a regular contributor on The Rich Eisen Show while moving to the NFL Network's flagship program NFL Total Access. In 2016 he became cohost on the afternoon drive show at ESPN LA.

In 2017 Davis was accused of sexual assault and sexual misconduct by two makeup artists while Davis was working on Total Access. Davis was terminated from both ESPN and the NFL Network following the accusations.

In 2019 he became cohost of Bleav in 49ers Podcast.

In 2020 he was cleared of all sexual harassment allegations with all claims being dismissed with prejudice in Los Angeles County Superior Court.
