= Ivory Lee Brown =

American football player (born 1969)

No. 33
- Position: Running back

Personal information
- Born: August 17, 1969 (age 57); Palestine, Texas, U.S.
- Listed height: 6 ft 2 in (1.88 m)
- Listed weight: 230 lb (104 kg)

Career information
- High school: Palestine
- College: Arkansas–Pine Bluff
- NFL draft: 1991: 7th round, 171st overall pick

Career history
- Phoenix Cardinals (1991); San Antonio Riders (1992); Phoenix Cardinals (1992–1993); Minnesota Vikings (1993)

Awards and highlights
- All-World League (1992)

Career NFL statistics
- Rushing yards: 194
- Rushing average: 2.9
- Rushing touchdowns: 2
- Stats at Pro Football Reference

Ivory Lee Brown (born August 17, 1969) is an American former professional football player who was a running back in the National Football League (NFL) and World League of American Football (WALF). He played college football for the Arkansas–Pine Bluff Golden Lions. Afterwards, he played for the Phoenix Cardinals of the NFL and the San Antonio Riders of the WLAF. Brown is the uncle of former NFL running back Adrian Peterson.

== College career ==
Brown was born in Palestine, Texas, and was a highly recruited running back out Palestine High School. He rushed for 1,800 yards as a senior in 1986, and was the rated the #2 recruit in Texas. Brown originally intended to sign with Texas A&M University out of high school, but due to SAT problems, he attended Tyler Junior College instead. While at junior college, Brown was recruited to the University of Arkansas at Pine Bluff by head coach Archie "Gunslinger" Cooley. Cooley had formerly coached Pro Football Hall of Famer Jerry Rice at Mississippi Valley State University, and had recently come to UAPB, which was an NAIA school at the time. In 1989, Brown's first season with the Golden Lions, he led the NAIA in rushing with 1,465 yards, averaging 8.3 yards per carry.

== Professional career ==
=== NFL ===
Pre-draft measurables
Height	Weight	Arm length	Hand span	40-yard dash	10-yard split	20-yard split	20-yard shuttle	Vertical jump	Broad jump	Bench press
6 ft 1 5/8 in (1.87 m)	243 lb (110 kg)	32 1/2 in (0.83 m)	9 5/8 in (0.24 m)	4.70 s	1.69 s	2.77 s	4.78 s	36.0 in (0.91 m)	10 ft 1 in (3.07 m)	7 reps
All values from NFL Combine

Brown was selected by the Phoenix Cardinals in the seventh round (171st pick overall) of the 1991 NFL draft. He was placed on the team's developmental squad, and did not see any playing time during his rookie season.

=== WLAF ===
The San Antonio Riders of the fledgling World League of American Football signed Brown in 1992 to replace running back Ricky Blake, who had signed with the Dallas Cowboys at the conclusion of the 1991 season. He played with the Riders in 1992 and won the league's rushing title with 767 yards. His efforts helped the Riders to a 7–3 record, and he was named first-team All World League, giving him an opportunity to return to the Cardinals for the 1992 NFL regular season.

=== Return to the NFL ===
Brown emerged as a potential starter due to running back Johnny Johnson's unexpected pre-season holdout. Brown played in seven games, starting five, during the 1992 NFL season, but did not make the Cardinals roster in 1993 and later retired. He had 68 carries for 194 yards and two touchdowns in his NFL career.

== See also ==
- UAPB Golden Lions football
