= Ernie Jones (wide receiver) =

American football player (born 1964)

No. 86, 83
- Position: Wide receiver

Personal information
- Born: December 15, 1964 (age 61); Elkhart, Indiana, U.S.
- Listed height: 5 ft 11 in (1.80 m)
- Listed weight: 191 lb (87 kg)

Career information
- High school: Memorial (Elkhart)
- College: Indiana (1984–1987)
- NFL draft: 1988: 7th round, 179th overall pick

Career history
- Phoenix Cardinals (1988–1992); Los Angeles Rams (1993); Amsterdam Admirals (1995)

Awards and highlights
- First-team All-American (1987); Big Ten Co-Player of the Year (1987); First-team All-Big Ten (1987)

Career NFL statistics
- Receptions: 215
- Receiving yards: 3,630
- Receiving touchdowns: 20
- Stats at Pro Football Reference

Ernest Lee Jones (born December 15, 1964) is an American former professional football player who was a wide receiver in the National Football League (NFL) and the World League of American Football (WLAF). He played for the Phoenix Cardinals and the Los Angeles Rams of the NFL, and the Amsterdam Admirals of the WLAF. Jones played college football for the Indiana Hoosiers and was selected 179th overall by the Cardinals in the seventh round of the 1988 NFL draft.

== NFL career statistics ==
Legend
**Bold**	Career high

Year	Team	Games		Receiving				
Year	Team	GP	GS	Rec	Yds	Avg	Lng	TD
1988	PHO	**16**	0	23	496	**21.6**	**93**	3
1989	PHO	15	9	45	838	18.6	72	3
1990	PHO	15	8	43	724	16.8	68	**4**
1991	PHO	**16**	**16**	**61**	**957**	15.7	53	**4**
1992	PHO	11	5	38	559	14.7	72	**4**
1993	RAM	10	0	5	56	11.2	21	2
Career		83	38	215	3,630	16.9	93	20

== See also ==
- List of NCAA major college football yearly receiving leaders
