= Rich Camarillo =

American football player (born 1959)

No. 3, 16
- Position: Punter

Personal information
- Born: November 29, 1959 (age 66); Whittier, California, U.S.
- Listed height: 5 ft 11 in (1.80 m)
- Listed weight: 193 lb (88 kg)

Career information
- High school: El Rancho (Pico Rivera, California)
- College: Cerritos; Washington
- NFL draft: 1981: undrafted

Career history
- New England Patriots (1981–1987); Los Angeles Rams (1988); Phoenix Cardinals (1989–1993); Houston Oilers (1994–1995); Detroit Lions (1996)*; Oakland Raiders (1996)
- * Offseason or practice squad member only

Awards and highlights
- First-team All-Pro (1992); 3× Second-team All-Pro (1983, 1989, 1993); 5× Pro Bowl (1983, 1989, 1991–1993); 2× NFL punting yards leader (1985, 1994); New England Patriots All-1980s Team; New England Patriots 35th Anniversary Team; New England Patriots 50th Anniversary Team; Golden Toe Award (1992)

Career NFL statistics
- Punts: 1,027
- Punting yards: 43,895
- Punting average: 42.7
- Longest punt: 76
- Inside 20: 279
- Stats at Pro Football Reference

Richard Jon Camarillo (/kæməˈriːoʊ/ kam-ə-REE-oh; born November 29, 1959) is an American former professional football player who was a punter for 16 seasons in the National Football League (NFL) for the New England Patriots (1981–1987), Los Angeles Rams (1988), Phoenix Cardinals (1989–1993), Houston Oilers (1994–1995), and Oakland Raiders (1996).

He played college football for the Cerritos Falcons, where he earned All-American honors. He then transferred and played for the Washington Huskies (1979–1980), where he was selected as a member of the Huskies All-Century team.

== Professional career ==
A consistently solid, dependable punter during his 16 NFL seasons, Camarillo led the league in punting yards twice (1985, 1994), net yard average three times (1983, 1991 and 1992), and gross yards per punt once (1989). He also led the league in 1994 with 35 footballs inside the 20-yard line. With the Patriots, Camarillo made a championship appearance in Super Bowl XX, and ended up punting often as his team was blown out 46–10 by the Chicago Bears. Camarillo punted 6 times for 263 yards (43.8 average), with 225 net yards (37.5 average), one touchback, and one punt in the 20, including a then Super Bowl record 62-yard punt that planted the Bears back at their own 4-yard line, this record being broken by another Patriots punter, Ryan Allen, who kicked a 64-yard punt in Super Bowl XLIX. However, Chicago still managed to drive a Super Bowl-record 96 yards and score a touchdown anyway.

Camarillo finished his career with 1,027 punts for 43,895 yards (42.7 average) and 279 punts inside the 20. Upon his retirement, that mark stood as the most in NFL history. Camarillo also had a career net average of 36.0 yards per punt. He was named to the NFL's all-rookie team in 1981. He was also selected to five Pro Bowl games after the 1983, 1989, 1991, 1992, and 1993 seasons, with Ray Guy and Shane Lechler sharing the record with seven appearances each as of 2016. Camarillo had a punt returned for a touchdown in his first NFL game on October 25, 1981. Fourteen seasons and 876 punts later on October 30, 1994, would be the next time one of his punts was returned for a score. He also owns the NFL's record for highest net avg. in a season with a mark of 39.6 yards. Camarillo's 44.5 yards per punt still stands as the highest punting average in NFL playoff history. He was also selected seven times (first or second-team) All-Pro, in his career. He was also named to the team of the 1990s by CNNSI. Camarillo was a nominee for induction into the NFL Pro Football Hall of Fame, class of 2009.

== NFL career statistics ==
Legend
	Led the league
**Bold**	Career high

=== Regular season ===
Year	Team	Punting									
Year	Team	GP	Punts	Yds	Net Yds	Lng	Avg	Net Avg	Blk	Ins20	TB
1981	NWE	9	47	1,959	1,570	75	41.7	33.4	0	12	9
1982	NWE	9	49	2,140	1,849	**76**	43.7	37.7	0	10	5
1983	NWE	16	81	3,615	3,003	70	44.6	37.1	0	25	11
1984	NWE	7	48	2,020	1,666	61	42.1	34.7	0	12	7
1985	NWE	16	92	3,953	3,095	75	43.0	33.6	0	16	**13**
1986	NWE	16	89	3,746	3,041	64	42.1	33.1	**3**	16	7
1987	NWE	12	62	2,489	1,996	73	40.1	31.7	1	14	8
1988	RAM	9	40	1,579	1,394	57	39.5	34.9	0	11	2
1989	PHO	15	76	3,298	2,848	58	43.4	37.5	0	21	6
1990	PHO	16	67	2,865	2,507	63	42.8	37.4	0	16	5
1991	PHO	16	76	3,445	2,992	60	**45.3**	38.9	1	19	7
1992	PHO	15	54	2,317	2,136	73	42.9	**39.6**	0	23	2
1993	PHO	16	73	3,189	2,762	61	43.7	37.8	0	23	8
1994	HOU	16	**96**	**4,115**	**3,497**	58	42.9	36.4	0	**35**	9
1995	HOU	16	77	3,165	2,717	60	41.1	34.8	1	26	8
1996	OAK	1	0	0	0	0	0.0	0.0	0	0	0
Career		205	1,027	43,895	37,073	76	42.7	35.9	6	279	107

=== Playoffs ===
Year	Team	Punting									
Year	Team	GP	Punts	Yds	Net Yds	Lng	Avg	Net Avg	Blk	Ins20	TB
1982	NWE	1	5	218	178	58	43.6	35.6	0	1	0
1985	NWE	4	**21**	**889**	**565**	**62**	42.3	25.7	**1**	**3**	**3**
1986	NWE	1	9	452	377	60	**50.2**	**41.9**	0	0	2
Career		6	35	1,559	1,120	62	44.5	31.1	1	4	5

== After football ==
Camarillo coached the Ahwatukee Little League All-stars from Phoenix, Arizona in the 2006 Little League World Series in Williamsport, Pennsylvania. His son, Eric, was a member of that team.
