= Larry Centers =

American football player (born 1968)

No. 37, 31
- Position: Fullback

Personal information
- Born: June 1, 1968 (age 58); Tatum, Texas, U.S.
- Listed height: 6 ft 0 in (1.83 m)
- Listed weight: 225 lb (102 kg)

Career information
- High school: Tatum High School
- College: Stephen F. Austin (1986–1989)
- NFL draft: 1990: 5th round, 115th overall pick

Career history
- Phoenix / Arizona Cardinals (1990–1998); Washington Redskins (1999–2000); Buffalo Bills (2001–2002); New England Patriots (2003)

Awards and highlights
- Super Bowl champion (XXXVIII); First-team All-Pro (1996); 3× Pro Bowl (1995, 1996, 2001); NFL record: Most career catches by a fullback: 827

Career NFL statistics
- Rushing yards: 2,188
- Rushing average: 3.6
- Rushing touchdowns: 14
- Receptions: 827
- Receiving yards: 6,797
- Receiving touchdowns: 28
- Stats at Pro Football Reference

Larry Eugene Centers (born June 1, 1968) is an American former professional football player who was a fullback in the National Football League (NFL) for 14 seasons, mostly the Phoenix / Arizona Cardinals (1990–1998). Centers then played for the Washington Redskins (1999–2000), the Buffalo Bills (2001–2002), and finally was a member of the New England Patriots, with whom he won a Super Bowl.

Centers played college football for the Stephen F. Austin Lumberjacks. One of the most prolific pass catching running backs in NFL history, he topped 100 receptions in 1995 and had 99 receptions in 1996. He owns the NFL record for most passes caught by a running back during a career. He was selected to the Pro Bowl in 1995, 1996, and 2001.

== Early life ==
Centers was born in Tatum, Texas and grew up in Longview. He began playing little league football for the Bramlette Bears as a running back and quarterback during his elementary school years and went on to play in middle school for the Forest Park Eagles and high school for the Longview Lobos until his junior year. He played on both sides of the ball as a defensive back and runningback and wide receiver. Centers did not play football at all his junior year of high school. After his family moved to nearby Tatum, where his mother was an administrator in education, Centers decided to play football again after being urged to do so by his elder brother. After a solid season in Tatum, he earned a scholarship to nearby Stephen F. Austin State University. He was also recruited by Baylor, Texas Tech, and several junior colleges. His brother, Donnie, played for the University of Arkansas and coach Lou Holtz as a wide receiver.

== College career ==
After being recruited as a running back, wide receiver, and a defensive back, Centers began his college football career with the Division I-AA Stephen F. Austin Lumberjacks as a wide receiver. As a freshman, he broke his pinky finger on his left hand and was then assigned to play scout team running back and special teams. In his sophomore season against Nevada, an injury to the team's starting running back allowed Centers a chance to play. In the win, Centers rushed nine times for 96 yards and finished the season with 100-plus rushing yards in each of the remaining six games. He also led the Lumberjacks in receptions, rushing yards and yards from scrimmage during his junior and senior years. Centers was a two-time all-Southland Conference pick and set a school record for rushing yards in his senior season. In 1989, with Centers as their starting running back, the Lumberjacks advanced to the 1989 NCAA Division I-AA Football Championship Game where they lost by a field goal to the Georgia Southern Eagles.

== Professional career ==
Pre-draft measurables
Height	Weight	Arm length	Hand span	Broad jump	Bench press
5 ft 10 3/4 in (1.80 m)	203 lb (92 kg)	29 7/8 in (0.76 m)	10 5/8 in (0.27 m)	8 ft 10 in (2.69 m)	8 reps
All values from NFL Combine

=== Phoenix/Arizona Cardinals ===
After graduating from Stephen F. Austin State University, Centers was selected by the Phoenix Cardinals in the fifth round of the 1990 NFL draft. He saw limited playing time in his first two seasons, as head coach Joe Bugel had doubts on his ability to carry the ball and thought of him as a third-down running back. According to his coaches, Centers particularly needed work on his pass protection skills and he spent an entire off-season mastering the capability. His playing time started to increase and by 1992, Centers rushed for 139 yards and caught 50 passes for 417 yards. On October 4, 1992, Centers scored the winning touchdown against the Washington Redskins with less than a minute remaining to break an 11-game Cardinals losing streak. The game-winning touchdown was the first of Centers' NFL career.

The role of the fullback as a ball carrier was starting to diminish as the NFL game evolved during the 1990s. Yet, Centers's offensive numbers only increased as the years went by, especially his receptions and his leadership ability. He caught 66 passes in his fourth NFL season. In 1994, Bugel was fired and replaced by Buddy Ryan. Ryan allowed Centers more opportunity to run with the ball, carrying the ball a career-high 115 times while catching 77 receptions. In 1995, Centers had one of the greatest seasons ever of any modern day fullback, recording 101 receptions for 962 yards. He became the first runningback to record 100 receptions. He held the record for most receptions by a running back with 101 until this record was broken by Matt Forte in 2014 with 102. He also rushed for 254 yards, scored four touchdowns, and was selected to the Pro Bowl for the first time. Unfortunately, his team was not successful despite his contributions; they finished the 1995 season with a 4–12 record and Ryan was fired at the end of the year and replaced by Vince Tobin.

In 1996, Centers recorded 99 receptions for 766 yards and seven touchdowns, while also gaining a career-high 425 yards on 116 carries, and he scored two touchdowns on the ground. He was selected to the Pro Bowl for the second year in a row, but once again his team had a disappointing season, finishing with a 7–9 record. Centers became a free agent after the season. Both the Washington Redskins and the New York Giants were interested in his services, but ultimately he signed a three-year, $7.5 million contract to stay with the Cardinals after switching agents, becoming the fifth highest paid running back in the league. After previously leading the team in receptions the last four seasons, the Cardinals started to try Centers in different offensive formations at wide receiver. Centers continued to be a major contributor to the Cardinals, recording 123 receptions and 386 rushing yards over the next two seasons. In his final year with Arizona (1998), the team recorded a 9–7 record and made the playoffs as a wild card. The Cardinals made it all the way to the divisional playoffs before being eliminated in a 41–21 loss to the Minnesota Vikings. Centers finished his Cardinals career as the team's all-time leader in receptions (535).

=== Washington Redskins ===
Citing durability and salary cap concerns, the Cardinals released Centers on June 19, 1999. At the time of his release, Centers was considered "the heart and soul" of the Cardinals offense. He signed with the Washington Redskins and quickly became a team leader, recording 69 receptions in his first season with the team. During a crucial game against the 49ers, Centers caught a 33-yard touchdown pass in overtime, which made the Redskins the NFC Eastern division champs for the first time since 1991 and gave the team a playoff berth. The Redskins finished the regular season with a 10–6 record but were eliminated in the divisional playoffs by the Tampa Bay Buccaneers, 14–13. The following year, he caught 81 passes for 600 yards, rushed for 103 yards, and used his blocking to help running back Stephen Davis achieve star numbers, 1,318 rushing yards and 11 touchdowns. He passed Keith Byars for most receptions by a running back. However, the Redskins recorded only an 8–8 record that year and did not make the playoffs.

=== Buffalo Bills ===
In 2001, Centers signed with the Buffalo Bills and made it to his third Pro Bowl appearance, catching 80 passes, this time for a total of 620 yards, with 160 yards rushing and four touchdowns. In the fourth quarter of a 23–20 loss against the Seattle Seahawks, he surpassed Ronnie Harmon's record for most receiving yards by an NFL running back with a two-yard reception. He also surpassed Hall of Famers Charlie Joiner and Michael Irvin to reach the top ten in all-time receptions by a player.

=== New England Patriots ===
After spending another year with Buffalo, Centers joined the Patriots in 2003. By this time, 35-year-old Centers' role as a receiver (along with ball carrier) had diminished. He was released after the sixth game of the season due to a knee injury, before re-signing with the Patriots in December. He recorded 19 receptions for 106 yards and rushed for 82 yards. Still, his blocking contributions as part of the Patriots offense allowed him to earn a Super Bowl ring; New England finished the season with a 14–2 record and went on to defeat the Carolina Panthers 32–29 in Super Bowl XXXVIII.

Centers retired from professional football before the beginning of the 2004 season.

=== Career achievements ===
In his 14 NFL seasons, Centers rushed for 2,188 yards, caught 827 passes for 6,797 yards, returned five punts for 30 yards, returned 33 kickoffs for 617 yards and scored 42 touchdowns (14 rushing/28 receiving).

Centers' 827 receptions are currently the most by any running back and were the most by any non-wide receiver in NFL history, until tight end Tony Gonzalez surpassed this mark in 2008. He recorded a reception in 143 consecutive games beginning in the 1993 season; it was the 6th most in NFL history when the streak ended in 2002 and the most by a running back until he was surpassed by Marshall Faulk. When Centers retired, he was seventh in receptions in NFL history. Because NFL fullbacks are now almost exclusively used as blockers, Centers is widely recognized as one of the greatest pass receiving fullbacks.

== NFL career statistics ==
Legend
	Won the Super Bowl
**Bold**	Career high

=== Regular season ===
Year	Team	Games		Rushing					Receiving				
Year	Team	GP	GS	Att	Yds	Avg	Lng	TD	Rec	Yds	Avg	Lng	TD
1990	PHO	6	0	0	0	0.0	0	0	0	0	0.0	0	0
1991	PHO	9	2	14	44	3.1	8	0	19	176	9.3	23	0
1992	PHO	**16**	1	37	139	3.8	28	0	50	417	8.3	26	2
1993	PHO	**16**	9	25	152	**6.1**	33	0	66	603	9.1	29	3
1994	ARI	**16**	5	115	336	2.9	17	**5**	77	647	8.4	36	2
1995	ARI	**16**	10	78	254	3.3	20	2	**101**	**962**	**9.5**	32	2
1996	ARI	**16**	**14**	**116**	**425**	3.7	24	2	99	766	7.7	39	**7**
1997	ARI	15	**14**	101	276	2.7	14	1	54	409	7.6	29	1
1998	ARI	**16**	12	31	110	3.5	14	0	69	559	8.1	**54**	2
1999	WAS	**16**	12	13	51	3.9	12	0	69	544	7.9	33	3
2000	WAS	15	6	19	103	5.4	14	0	81	600	7.4	26	3
2001	BUF	**16**	13	34	160	4.7	**50**	2	80	620	7.8	26	2
2002	BUF	**16**	7	11	56	5.1	13	2	43	388	9.0	25	0
2003	NWE	9	3	21	82	3.9	13	0	19	106	5.6	14	1
		198	108	615	2,188	3.6	50	14	827	6,797	8.2	54	28

=== Playoffs ===
Year	Team	Games		Rushing					Receiving				
Year	Team	GP	GS	Att	Yds	Avg	Lng	TD	Rec	Yds	Avg	Lng	TD
1998	ARI	2	**2**	**3**	5	1.7	6	0	9	61	6.8	12	**1**
1999	WAS	2	1	2	**10**	**5.0**	**7**	0	**10**	**69**	6.9	17	0
2003	NWE	**3**	**2**	2	0	0.0	0	0	2	32	**16.0**	**28**	0
		7	5	7	15	2.1	7	0	21	162	7.7	28	1
