= List of Jacksonville State Gamecocks in the NFL draft =

This is a list of Jacksonville State Gamecocks football players in the NFL draft.

== Key ==
B	Back	K	Kicker	NT	Nose tackle
C	Center	LB	Linebacker	FB	Fullback
DB	Defensive back	P	Punter	HB	Halfback
DE	Defensive end	QB	Quarterback	WR	Wide receiver
DT	Defensive tackle	RB	Running back	G	Guard
E	End	T	Offensive tackle	TE	Tight end

== Selections ==
Year	Round	Pick	Player	Team	Position	Notes
1957	14	167	Phil Smith	Detroit Lions	B	
1958	28	332	Dean Akin	Pittsburgh Steelers	E	
1960	14	159	Jim Glasgow	Detroit Lions	T	
1966	11	167	Terry Owens	Chicago Bears	WR	
1971	4	94	David Robinson	Kansas City Chiefs	TE	
1979	2	50	Jesse Baker	Houston Oilers	DE	
1987	9	227	Keith McKeller	Buffalo Bills	TE	
1990	2	53	Eric Davis	San Francisco 49ers	DB	
1990	10	273	Orlando Adams	Philadelphia Eagles	DT	
1991	6	162	Darrell Malone	Kansas City Chiefs	DB	
1991	11	299	David Gulledge	Washington Redskins	DB	
2013	6	195	Alan Bonner	Houston Texans	WR	
2018	5	154	Siran Neal	Buffalo Bills	DB	
