= Randal Hill =

American football player and politician (born 1969)

No. 81, 89
- Position: Wide receiver

Personal information
- Born: September 21, 1969 (age 57); Miami, Florida, U.S.
- Listed height: 5 ft 10 in (1.78 m)
- Listed weight: 180 lb (82 kg)

Career information
- High school: Miami Killian (Kendall, Florida)
- College: Miami (FL)
- NFL draft: 1991: 1st round, 23rd overall pick

Career history
- Miami Dolphins (1991); Phoenix / Arizona Cardinals (1991–1994); Miami Dolphins (1995–1996); New Orleans Saints (1997); Chicago Bears (1998)*
- * Offseason or practice squad member only

Awards and highlights
- 2× National champion (1987, 1989)

Career NFL statistics
- Receptions: 262
- Receiving yards: 3,849
- Touchdowns: 14
- Stats at Pro Football Reference

Randal "Thrill" Hill (born September 21, 1969) is an American former professional football player who was a wide receiver in the National Football League (NFL) from 1991 through 1997. He played for the Miami Dolphins, Phoenix / Arizona Cardinals, and New Orleans Saints.

After his playing career, Hill ran in the 2016 election for the United States House of Representatives in Florida's 24th congressional district.

== Football career ==
Hill graduated from Miami Killian High School in Kendall, Florida, where he played for the school's American football team as a cornerback. He attended the University of Miami, and played college football for the Miami Hurricanes football team. At Miami, he became a wide receiver. In his Hurricanes' career, Hill had 107 receptions for 1,643 yards with 11 touchdowns, and returned 54 kickoffs for an average of 21.6 yards per return.

The Miami Dolphins selected Hill in the first round, with the 23rd overall selection, of the 1991 NFL draft. Hill missed four weeks of training camp in a contract dispute, before he signed with the Dolphins, reportedly for $2 million. After the first game of the 1991 season, with Dolphins coach Don Shula believing that Hill was not ready to play, the Dolphins traded Hill to the Phoenix Cardinals for a first round pick in the 1992 NFL draft. Hill caught 43 passes for 495 yards and one touchdown in 1991, had 58 receptions for 861 yards in 1992, and recorded 35 receptions for 519 yards with four touchdowns in 1993. He played with the Cardinals through the 1994 season, and then returned to Miami for the 1995 and 1996 seasons. He spent the 1997 season with the New Orleans Saints. He led the Saints with 55 receptions for 761 yards. He signed with the Chicago Bears for the 1998 season, but did not make the team.

Hill was interviewed about his time at the University of Miami for the documentary The U, which premiered December 12, 2009 on ESPN.

== NFL career statistics ==
Legend
	Led the league
**Bold**	Career high

=== Regular season ===
Year	Team	Games		Receiving				
Year	Team	GP	GS	Rec	Yds	Avg	Lng	TD
1991	MIA	1	0	0	0	0.0	0	0
1991	PHO	15	4	43	495	11.5	31	1
1992	PHO	**16**	14	**58**	**861**	14.8	49	3
1993	PHO	**16**	8	35	519	14.8	58	**4**
1994	ARI	14	14	38	544	14.3	51	0
1995	MIA	12	0	12	260	**21.7**	58	0
1996	MIA	14	5	21	409	19.5	61	**4**
1997	NOR	15	**15**	55	761	13.8	**89**	2
		103	60	262	3,849	14.7	89	14

=== Playoffs ===
Year	Team	Games		Receiving				
Year	Team	GP	GS	Rec	Yds	Avg	Lng	TD
1995	MIA	1	0	2	59	29.5	45	1
		1	0	2	59	29.5	45	1

== Career after football ==
After his football career ended, Hill worked for the Sunrise, Florida, police department and the Palm Beach County Sheriff's Office. He then became an agent for United States Customs.

In July 2015, Hill declared that he would run in the Democratic Party primary election against incumbent U.S. Representative Frederica Wilson in the 2016 election to represent Florida's 24th congressional district in the House of Representatives. Wilson defeated Hill.

== Personal life ==
Hill lives in Davie, Florida, with his wife, an internal medicine doctor.
