= Johnny Johnson (American football) =

American football player (born 1968)

No. 39 89
- Position: Running back

Personal information
- Born: June 11, 1968 (age 58); Santa Clara, California, U.S.
- Listed height: 6 ft 3 in (1.91 m)
- Listed weight: 220 lb (100 kg)

Career information
- High school: Santa Cruz (Santa Cruz, California)
- College: San Jose State
- NFL draft: 1990: 7th round, 169th overall pick

Career history
- Phoenix Cardinals (1990–1992); New York Jets (1993–1994); San Francisco 49ers (1996)*
- * Offseason or practice squad member only

Awards and highlights
- Pro Bowl (1990); PFWA All-Rookie Team (1990)

Career NFL statistics
- Rushing yards: 4,078
- Average: 3.9
- Rushing touchdowns: 21
- Stats at Pro Football Reference

Johnny Johnson Jr. (born June 11, 1968) is an American former professional football player who was a running back in the National Football League (NFL) for the New York Jets and the Phoenix Cardinals between 1990 and 1994. He played college football for the San Jose State Spartans.

== High school and college ==
He prepped at Santa Cruz High School. Johnson attended and graduated from San Jose State University. With 1,219 yards rushing and 61 catches in receiving, Johnson was considered among the top 20 college football players in the United States in 1988. After five games into his senior season, Johnson was kicked off team for missing practices and team meetings. Johnson's reasoning for missing practices was to care for his mother in the aftermath of the 1989 Loma Prieta earthquake, but because telephone lines were down across the area he had no way to communicate with head coach Claude Gilbert. Gilbert however claimed that Johnson had already skipped 2:00pm practice anyway to attend Game 3 of the 1989 World Series. Nevertheless, his dismissal from the Spartans football program dropped Johnson's draft stock down to the 169th pick in the 1990 NFL draft by the Phoenix Cardinals. In addition to football, Johnson also played twelve games for the San Jose State Spartans basketball team after a majority of the team walked off and refused to play under coach Bill Berry, accusing him of "mental cruelty".

== Professional career ==
Pre-draft measurables
| Height | Weight | Arm length | Hand span | 40-yard dash | 10-yard split | 20-yard split | 20-yard shuttle | Vertical jump |
|---|---|---|---|---|---|---|---|---|
| 6 ft 2 in (1.88 m) | 212 lb (96 kg) | 32 in (0.81 m) | 9 3/8 in (0.24 m) | 4.64 s | 1.63 s | 2.75 s | 4.18 s | 33.5 in (0.85 m) |
All values from NFL Combine

Johnson played in the 1991 Pro Bowl. After playing for three seasons for the Cardinals, he was traded during the 1993 NFL draft to the New York Jets, in exchange for the Cardinals moving from the number 4 pick in the draft to the Jets' number 3 draft position. The Cardinals badly wanted Garrison Hearst, who also played running back, so the Cardinals were willing to part with Johnson just to move up one draft spot.

After arriving on the Jets, Johnny Johnson was named Jets team MVP in 1993 in a vote by his teammates. Johnson finished the season ranked second in the AFC in total yards from scrimmage. He was one of only two backs to lead his team in rushing and receptions.

He became a free agent in 1995, and the Jets made him available for the expansion draft that year. Johnson considered signing with the San Francisco 49ers, where he would twice refuse to work out for that year. In April 1996, Johnson signed a two-year, $3-million contract with the 49ers; consequently, the 49ers waived Dennis Brown to make salary cap room for Johnson. Ultimately, he never played a down for the team, having suffered an inflamed joint in his lower back during opening non-contact practice in training camp on July 18. He was then cut in August.

== NFL career statistics ==
| Year | Team | GP | Att | Yds | Avg | Lng | TD | Rec | Yds | Avg | Lng | TD |
|---|---|---|---|---|---|---|---|---|---|---|---|---|
| 1990 | PHO | 14 | 234 | 926 | 4.0 | 41 | 5 | 25 | 241 | 9.6 | 35 | 0 |
| 1991 | PHO | 15 | 196 | 666 | 3.4 | 21 | 4 | 29 | 225 | 7.8 | 51 | 2 |
| 1992 | PHO | 12 | 178 | 734 | 4.1 | 42 | 6 | 14 | 103 | 7.4 | 26 | 0 |
| 1993 | NYJ | 15 | 198 | 821 | 4.1 | 57 | 3 | 67 | 641 | 9.6 | 48 | 1 |
| 1994 | NYJ | 16 | 240 | 931 | 3.9 | 90 | 3 | 42 | 303 | 7.2 | 24 | 2 |
| Career | | 72 | 1,046 | 4,078 | 3.9 | 90 | 21 | 177 | 1,513 | 8.5 | 51 | 5 |
