= Alphonso Taylor =

American football player (born 1969)

No. 95
- Position: Defensive lineman

Personal information
- Born: September 7, 1969 (age 57); Trenton, New Jersey
- Listed height: 6 ft 3 in (1.91 m)
- Listed weight: 360 lb (163 kg)

Career information
- High school: Trenton Central
- College: Temple

Career history
- Phoenix Cardinals (1992–1993)*; Denver Broncos (1993); San Diego Chargers (1994)*
- * Offseason or practice squad member only

Career statistics
- Games played: 3
- Games started: 0
- Stats at Pro Football Reference

Alphonso Taylor (born September 7, 1969 in Trenton, New Jersey) is an American former professional football player who was a defensive tackle for the Denver Broncos of the National Football League (NFL) in 1993. He played college football for the Temple Owls. Taylor played in three games for the Broncos but started none.
