= Bobby Herbert =

Scottish footballer

Personal information
- Full name: Robert Herbert
- Date of birth: 21 November 1925
- Place of birth: Glasgow, Scotland
- Date of death: 31 December 2006 (aged 81)
- Place of death: Kirkintilloch, Scotland
- Position: Wing half

Youth career
- Blantyre Victoria

Senior career*
Years	Team	Apps	(Gls)
1950−1956	Doncaster Rovers	108	(15)
1956−1957	King's Lynn		
1957	Third Lanark	5	(1)
1957−1961	Albion Rovers	115	(6)
1961−1962	Brechin City	5	(0)
- * Club domestic league appearances and goals

Robert Herbert (21 November 1925 – 31 December 2006) was a Scottish footballer who played as a wing half in the English and Scottish Football Leagues.

Born in Glasgow, Scotland, Herbert started off with Blantyre Victoria before moving to Doncaster Rovers. It took a while to make his way into the first team, but by the time he left he had made 117 appearances over six seasons for the Division 2 club, and he'd netted 15 goals.

He then had a short spell at Midland League King's Lynn before returning to his native Scotland and briefly playing for Third Lanark in the Scottish First Division. Apparently Doncaster were paid £500 for Herbert without the approval of the Third Lanark board, so the manager was forced to pay this back out of his own pocket, although stole it back before being dismissed from his post.

Following an unsuccessful time at Third Lanark, he dropped down a league to Albion Rovers where he spent four seasons. Lastly he played league football for a season at Brechin City who finished bottom of the league that season.
