= Steve Hyche =

American football player (born 1963)

No. 58, 56, 97
- Position: Linebacker

Personal information
- Born: June 12, 1963 (age 63); Jasper, Alabama, U.S.
- Listed height: 6 ft 3 in (1.91 m)
- Listed weight: 241 lb (109 kg)

Career information
- High school: Cordova (AL)
- College: West Alabama
- NFL draft: 1989: undrafted

Career history
- Chicago Bears (1989); Birmingham Fire (1991); Phoenix Cardinals (1991–1993)

Career NFL statistics
- Sacks: 1
- Fumble recoveries: 3
- Stats at Pro Football Reference

Steven Jay Hyche (born June 12, 1963) is an American former professional football player who was a linebacker in the National Football League (NFL). He played college football for the West Alabama Tigers. Hyche played in the NFL for the Chicago Bears in 1989 and for the Phoenix Cardinals from 1991 to 1993.
