= Willie Williams (offensive tackle) =

American gridiron football player (born 1967)

No. 60, 65, 73
- Position: Offensive tackle

Personal information
- Born: August 6, 1967 (age 59); Houston, Texas, U.S.
- Listed height: 6 ft 6 in (1.98 m)
- Listed weight: 300 lb (136 kg)

Career information
- High school: Wheatley (Houston)
- College: LSU
- Supplemental draft: 1990: 9th round

Career history
- Phoenix Cardinals (1990–1992); New Orleans Saints (1994); Amsterdam Admirals (1996); Toronto Argonauts (1997–1998)

Career NFL statistics
- Games played: 32
- Games started: 8
- Receptions: 2
- Receiving yards: 10
- Receiving touchdowns: 1
- Stats at Pro Football Reference

Willie Lee Williams Jr. (born August 6, 1967) is an American former professional football player who was an offensive tackle for two seasons in the National Football League (NFL) with the Phoenix Cardinals and New Orleans Saints. He was selected by the Cardinals in the ninth round of the 1990 NFL supplemental draft after playing college football for the LSU Tigers. Williams was also a member of the Amsterdam Admirals and Toronto Argonauts.

== Early life and college ==
Willie Lee Williams Jr. was born on August 6, 1967, in Houston, Texas. He attended Phillis Wheatley High School in Houston.

Williams played college football as a tight end at Louisiana State University.

== Professional career ==
Williams was selected by the Phoenix Cardinals of the NFL in the ninth round of the 1990 NFL supplemental draft. He played in sixteen games, starting three, for the Cardinals in 1991. He played in sixteen games, starting five, for the NFL's New Orleans Saints in 1994. Williams was selected by the Amsterdam Admirals of the World League of American Football (WLAF) in the second round of the 1996 WLAF Draft and played for them during the 1996 season. He played in 33 games for the Toronto Argonauts of the CFL from 1997 to 1998.
