= Walter Reeves (American football) =

American football player (born 1965)

No. 89, 86, 46
- Position: Tight end

Personal information
- Born: December 16, 1965 (age 60); Eufaula, Alabama, U.S.
- Listed height: 6 ft 4 in (1.93 m)
- Listed weight: 270 lb (122 kg)

Career information
- High school: Eufaula (Eufaula, Alabama)
- College: Auburn
- NFL draft: 1989: 2nd round, 40th overall pick

Career history
- Phoenix Cardinals (1989–1993); Cleveland Browns (1994–1995); San Diego Chargers (1996); Miami Dolphins (1997)*
- * Offseason or practice squad member only

Awards and highlights
- First-team All-SEC (1987)

Career NFL statistics
- Receptions: 55
- Receiving yards: 347
- Touchdowns: 3
- Stats at Pro Football Reference

Walter James Reeves (born December 15, 1965) is an American former professional football player who was a tight end for eight seasons in the National Football League (NFL). He played college football for the Auburn Tigers. He was selected by the Phoenix Cardinals in the second round of the 1989 NFL draft with the 40th overall pick.
