= Garth Jax =

American football player (born 1963)

No. 53
- Position: Linebacker

Personal information
- Born: September 16, 1963 (age 63); Houston, Texas, U.S.
- Listed height: 6 ft 2 in (1.88 m)
- Listed weight: 250 lb (113 kg)

Career information
- High school: Strake Jesuit College Preparatory (Houston)
- College: Florida State
- NFL draft: 1986: 11th round, 296th overall pick

Career history
- Dallas Cowboys (1986–1988); Phoenix/Arizona Cardinals (1989–1995)

Career NFL statistics
- Tackles: 179
- Sacks: 3
- Interceptions: 2
- Stats at Pro Football Reference

James Garth Jax (born September 16, 1963) is an American former professional football player who was a linebacker in the National Football League (NFL) for the Dallas Cowboys and Phoenix/Arizona Cardinals. He played college football for the Florida State Seminoles.

== Early life ==
Jax has two brothers and two sisters; Clayton Jax, the oldest, Brady Jax, Hilary, and Bronwyn. Jax grew up in Houston where he attended Strake Jesuit College Preparatory and helped his team win the 4-A state title in three of his four years. He received All-state honors at linebacker as a senior. He accepted a football scholarship from Florida State University.

He became a starter at outside linebacker in the last game of his freshman year against West Virginia University. Unfortunately his career would be plagued with injuries. He was limited to a part-time role as a sophomore because of an illness.

As a junior, he made 13 tackles during a 38–26 loss against the University of South Carolina, before suffering serious kidney and spleen injuries, to the extent that some doctors doubted if he could play football again. He missed the last 3 games of the season.

In his final college year, he made a team-high 13 tackles in the season opener against Tulane University. Despite a broken right thumb and a bruised left shoulder, as a starter he led the team with 6 quarterback sacks and ranked fifth with 63 tackles.

== Professional career ==
=== Dallas Cowboys ===
Jax was selected in the eleventh round of the 1986 NFL draft by the Dallas Cowboys. Although he was released on September first, he was re-signed one week later after Mike Renfro was placed on the injured reserve list. He emerged as one of the special teams leaders.

In 1987, a broken hand limited him to 3 games before being placed on the injured reserve list. The next year, he led the team in special teams tackles with 24.

=== Phoenix/Arizona Cardinals ===
After spending three seasons with the Cowboys, he signed with the Phoenix Cardinals as a Plan B free agent in 1989. The next year, he became a starter at inside linebacker after the team switched to a 3-4 defense and finished with career-highs in tackles (70), sacks (3) and interceptions (2).

On November 22, 1991, he was placed on the injured reserve list, ending the year with 52 tackles. In 1993, besides playing defense and special teams, he was also used as blocking back on short-yardage situations.

Jax may be best known amongst Cardinals fans for tackling a drunk fan who ran onto the field at Sun Devil Stadium in 1994. In 1995, he started four games and registered 48 tackles. He was waived on August 25, 1996.

== Personal life ==
After his retirement from football, he served as the Arizona Cardinals coordinator of NFL programs and community outreach for three years. He left the Cardinals organization to help start the Sunrise Bank.

In 2000, he was named football coach at Valley Lutheran High School. He also was the vice president of public relations at Cayenne Entertainment.

His stepfather Phil Abraira, at one time had the Florida State University records for average yards per punt return in a season (20.1) and longest punt return (92 yards). His son, Griffin, was a standout pitcher at the United States Air Force Academy and was selected in the 3rd round of the 2016 Major League Baseball draft by the Minnesota Twins.
