= David Braxton =

American football player (born 1965)

No. 53, 54, 58
- Position: Linebacker

Personal information
- Born: May 25, 1965 (age 61); Omaha, Nebraska, U.S.
- Listed height: 6 ft 2 in (1.88 m)
- Listed weight: 240 lb (109 kg)

Career information
- High school: Jacksonville (NC)
- College: Wake Forest
- NFL draft: 1989: 2nd round, 52nd overall pick

Career history
- Minnesota Vikings (1989–1990); Phoenix Cardinals (1990–1993); Cincinnati Bengals (1994)

Career NFL statistics
- Tackles: 99
- Sacks: 1
- Fumble recoveries: 1
- Stats at Pro Football Reference

David Harold Braxton (born May 25, 1965) is an American former professional football player who was a linebacker in the National Football League (NFL) for the Minnesota Vikings, Phoenix Cardinals, and Cincinnati Bengals. He was selected by the Vikings in the second round of the 1989 NFL draft. Braxton played college football for the Wake Forest Demon Deacons.
