= Mike Jones (defensive lineman) =

American football player (born 1969)

No. 75, 96, 90
- Position: Defensive end

Personal information
- Born: August 25, 1969 (age 57); Columbia, South Carolina, U.S.
- Listed height: 6 ft 4 in (1.93 m)
- Listed weight: 280 lb (127 kg)

Career information
- College: NC State
- NFL draft: 1991: 2nd round, 32nd overall pick

Career history
- Phoenix Cardinals (1991–1993); New England Patriots (1994–1997); St. Louis Rams (1998); Tennessee Titans (1999)

Awards and highlights
- Second-team All-ACC (1990)

Career NFL statistics
- Tackles: 199
- Sacks: 27.5
- Forced fumbles: 4
- Stats at Pro Football Reference

Michael David Jones Sr. (born August 25, 1969) is an American former professional football player who was a defensive end for nine seasons in the National Football League (NFL) for four teams. He played college football for the NC State Wolfpack.

== Early life ==
Jones was born and raised in Columbia, South Carolina, where he played football for his father at CA Johnson High School. As a senior he was selected as first-team All-State tight end and linebacker, and was elected to play in the 50th annual NC vs. SC Shrine Bowl. After receiving scholarship offers from over 30 schools around the country, Jones decided to attend North Carolina State University. He earned four varsity letters at N.C. State and as a 3-year starter earned All-ACC honors as a senior.

== Professional career ==
Pre-draft measurables
Height	Weight	Arm length	Hand span	40-yard dash	10-yard split	20-yard split	20-yard shuttle	Vertical jump	Broad jump	Bench press
6 ft 3 in (1.91 m)	274 lb (124 kg)	33 in (0.84 m)	10 3/8 in (0.26 m)	5.19 s	1.81 s	3.00 s	4.47 s	29.0 in (0.74 m)	8 ft 9 in (2.67 m)	21 reps

Jones was selected 32nd overall by the Arizona Cardinals in the second round of the 1991 NFL draft, and played for three years. As a free agent, Jones signed with the New England Patriots where he played for head coach Bill Parcells for four years. In 1996, he was elected captain of a Patriots team that would go on to be AFC champions and play in Super Bowl XXXI against the Green Bay Packers. After playing the 1998 season with the St. Louis Rams, Jones signed with the Tennessee Titans in what would be his final season as a player in the NFL. After a miraculous season which finished with an incredible playoff run and a 23–16 loss to the St. Louis Rams in Super Bowl XXXIV, Jones called it a career and decided to retire. Ironically, the player making the tackle on the final play to clinch the Super Bowl for the Rams was also named Mike Jones.

== Personal life ==
Jones is the father of entertainer Coco Jones and former NFL linebacker and current LSU analyst Mike Jones Jr.
