= Eric Hill (American football) =

American football player (born 1966)

No. 54, 58
- Position: Linebacker

Personal information
- Born: November 14, 1966 (age 59); Blytheville, Arkansas, U.S.
- Listed height: 6 ft 2 in (1.88 m)
- Listed weight: 260 lb (118 kg)

Career information
- High school: Galveston (TX) Ball
- College: LSU
- NFL draft: 1989: 1st round, 10th overall pick

Career history
- Phoenix/Arizona Cardinals (1989–1997); St. Louis Rams (1998); San Diego Chargers (1999–2000)

Career NFL statistics
- Tackles: 1,043
- Sacks: 9
- Forced fumbles: 9
- Stats at Pro Football Reference

Eric Dwayne Hill (born November 14, 1966) is an American former professional football player who was a linebacker for 11 seasons in the National Football League (NFL), primarily with the Phoenix/Arizona Cardinals. He was selected by the Cardinals in the first round with the 10th overall pick in the 1989 NFL draft. He played in 160 games in his professional career, starting in 151 of them. He attended Louisiana State University, where he played college football for the LSU Tigers football team. Hill was born in Blytheville, Arkansas and attended Ball High School in Galveston, Texas. Hill captained the Cardinals seven out of his nine years. Pro Bowl alternate 3 years, All Pro 94, 95 and also All Madden Team in 1995.
