= Vernice Smith =

American football player (born 1965)

No. 69, 61, 62
- Position: Guard

Personal information
- Born: October 24, 1965 (age 61); Orlando, Florida, U.S.
- Listed height: 6 ft 3 in (1.91 m)
- Listed weight: 300 lb (136 kg)

Career information
- High school: Oak Ridge (Orlando)
- College: Florida A&M
- NFL draft: 1987: undrafted

Career history
- Miami Dolphins (1987)*; Dallas Cowboys (1988)*; Cleveland Browns (1989)*; Phoenix Cardinals (1989–1992); Chicago Bears (1993); Washington Redskins (1993-1995); New York Jets (1996)*; Washington Redskins (1996)*; St. Louis Rams (1997)
- * Offseason or practice squad member only

Career NFL statistics
- Games played: 74
- Games started: 25
- Fumble recoveries: 1
- Stats at Pro Football Reference

Vernice Carlton Smith (born October 24, 1965) is an American former professional football player who was a guard in the National Football League (NFL) for the Phoenix Cardinals, Chicago Bears, Washington Redskins, and the St. Louis Rams. He played college football for the Florida A&M Rattlers as a starter.
