= Greg Davis (placekicker) =

American football player (born 1965)

No. 5, 7
- Position: Placekicker

Personal information
- Born: October 29, 1965 (age 61); Rome, Georgia, U.S.
- Listed height: 6 ft 0 in (1.83 m)
- Listed weight: 215 lb (98 kg)

Career information
- High school: Lakeside (Atlanta, Georgia)
- College: The Citadel
- NFL draft: 1987: 9th round, 246th overall pick

Career history
- Tampa Bay Buccaneers (1987)*; Atlanta Falcons (1987–1989); New England Patriots (1989); Atlanta Falcons (1990); Phoenix/Arizona Cardinals (1991–1996); Minnesota Vikings (1997); San Diego Chargers (1997); Oakland Raiders (1998)
- * Offseason or practice squad member only

Career NFL statistics
- Field goals made: 224
- Field goal attempts: 325
- Field goal %: 68.9
- Longest field goal: 55
- Stats at Pro Football Reference

Gregory Brian Davis (born October 29, 1965) is an American former professional football player who was a kicker for 12 seasons in the National Football League (NFL) from 1987 to 1998 with the Atlanta Falcons, New England Patriots, Phoenix/Arizona Cardinals, Minnesota Vikings, San Diego Chargers, and Oakland Raiders. He played college football for The Citadel Bulldogs.

== College career ==
Davis was a placekicker and punter for The Citadel, where he led the team in scoring for 3 consecutive seasons from 1983 to 1985. He holds school records for most career points by kicking (181), most Field Goals made (35), most Field Goals attempted (65), longest Field Goal (53 yards), longest punt (81 yards), highest punting average in a game (51.3), highest season punting average (44.6) and highest career punting average (42.1). He was inducted into The Citadel Athletic Hall of Fame in 1995.

== NFL career ==
Pre-draft measurables
Height	Weight	Arm length	Hand span	40-yard dash	10-yard split	20-yard split	20-yard shuttle	Vertical jump	Broad jump	Bench press
5 ft 11 in (1.80 m)	197 lb (89 kg)	29 1/4 in (0.74 m)	9 in (0.23 m)	5.07 s	1.78 s	2.94 s	4.68 s	22.0 in (0.56 m)	8 ft 8 in (2.64 m)	14 reps
All values from NFL Combine

Davis was a ninth round pick and 246th overall selection in the 1987 NFL draft, in 169 career games he made 224 of 325 Field Goals (69%) and 290 of 296 Extra Points (98%) for a total of 962 points. He also punted 10 times for a 35.8 yard average. He is co-holder of the NFL Record for most 50-yard field goals in one game (3) and the fourth leading scorer in Cardinals history with 474 points.

Davis was released in training camp by the Buccaneers but signed with Atlanta, in 1990 he scored 106 points. In 1989 Davis signed with the New England Patriots as a free agent where he spent one season then returned for a second stint with the Falcons. He joined the Cardinals in 1991 where he had a career best 55-yard field goal on 2 occasions and made the 6 longest field goals in team history. The Cardinals cut him near the end of the 1996 season. In 1997, he was signed by the Vikings, but was released 5 weeks into the season. He was picked up by San Diego and led the team in scoring. Davis spent his final NFL season with the Raiders in 1998 scoring 82 points.
