= Willie Wright (American football, born 1968) =

American football player (born 1968)

No. 59, 80
- Position: Linebacker / Tight end

Personal information
- Born: March 9, 1968 (age 58); Riverton, Wyoming, U.S.

Career information
- College: Wyoming
- NFL draft: 1991: undrafted

Career history
- Phoenix Cardinals (1991–1992); Frankfurt Galaxy (1992)
- Stats at Pro Football Reference

Willie Don Wright (born March 9, 1968) is an American former professional football player who was a linebacker and tight end in the National Football League (NFL) and the World League of American Football (WLAF). He played for the Phoenix Cardinals of the NFL, and the Frankfurt Galaxy of the WLAF. Wright played collegiately at the University of Wyoming.
