= Robert Massey =

American football player and coach (born 1966)

Personal information
- Born: February 17, 1966 (age 60); Rock Hill, South Carolina, U.S.
- Listed height: 5 ft 11 in (1.80 m)
- Listed weight: 200 lb (91 kg)

Career information
- High school: Garinger (Charlotte, North Carolina)
- College: North Carolina Central
- NFL draft: 1989: 2nd round, 46th overall pick

Career history

Playing
- New Orleans Saints (1989–1990); Phoenix Cardinals (1991–1993); Detroit Lions (1994–1995); Jacksonville Jaguars (1996); New York Giants (1997)

Coaching
- New York Giants (1998) Assistant defensive backs coach; Hillside HS (NC) (2001–2002) Head coach; North Carolina Central (2003) Wide receivers coach; North Carolina Central (2004) Defensive backs coach; Livingstone (2005–2006) Interim head coach; Shaw (2007–2009) Defensive backs coach; Shaw (2010–2011) Defensive coordinator; Shaw (2010–2015) Head coach; Winston-Salem State (2016–2018) Associate head coach, defensive backs coach, & special teams coordinator; Winston-Salem State (2019–2025) Head coach

Awards and highlights
- Pro Bowl (1992); PFWA All-Rookie Team (1989)

Career NFL statistics
- Tackles: 432
- Interceptions: 14
- Fumble recoveries: 5
- Stats at Pro Football Reference

Head coaching record
- Career: 41–78 (.345)

Robert Lee Massey (born February 17, 1966) is an American football coach and former professional player. Massey was selected by the New Orleans Saints in the second round of the 1989 NFL draft. Massey played professionally as a cornerback for five teams in the National Football League (NFL) from 1989 to 1997. Pro Football Hall of Fame wide receiver Michael Irvin described Massey as the toughest cornerback he faced during his career.

Massey was selected to the Pro Bowl in 1992. He played college football at North Carolina Central University in Durham, North Carolina.

Massey was the head football coach for Hillside High School from 2001 to 2002, the interim head coach for Livingstone College from 2005 to 2006, the head coach for Shaw University from 2010 to 2015, and Winston-Salem State University from 2019 to 2025. He amassed an overall record of 41–78 at the collegiate level.

== Head coaching record ==
=== College ===
Year	Team	Overall	Conference	Standing	Bowl/playoffs
Livingstone Blue Bears (Central Intercollegiate Athletic Association) (2005–2006)
2005	Livingstone	1–9	1–6	6th (Southern)	
2006	Livingstone	1–9	1–6	5th (Southern)	
Livingstone:		2–18	2–12		
Shaw Bears (Central Intercollegiate Athletic Association) (2012–2015)
2012	Shaw	4–6	3–4	4th (Southern)	
2013	Shaw	6–4	4–3	3rd (Southern)	
2014	Shaw	3–7	2–5	T–4th (Southern)	
2015	Shaw	1–9	1–6	T–5th (Southern)	
Shaw:		14–26	10–18		
Winston-Salem State Rams (Central Intercollegiate Athletic Association) (2019–2025)
2019	Winston-Salem State	4–6	3–4	T–3rd (Southern)	
2020–21	No team—COVID-19				
2021	Winston-Salem State	3–6	3–4	3rd (Southern)	
2022	Winston-Salem State	3–6	3–4	3rd (Southern)	
2023	Winston-Salem State	4–6	4–4	T–3rd (Southern)	
2024	Winston-Salem State	7–3	5–2	T–3rd	
2025	Winston-Salem State	4–6	2–5	T–7th	
Winston-Salem State:		25–34	20–23		
Total:		41–78			
