= Anthony Edwards (American football) =

American football player (born 1966)

No. 84, 81, 83
- Position: Wide receiver

Personal information
- Born: May 26, 1966 (age 60); Casa Grande, Arizona, U.S.
- Listed height: 5 ft 10 in (1.78 m)
- Listed weight: 195 lb (88 kg)

Career information
- High school: Casa Grande Union
- College: New Mexico Highlands
- NFL draft: 1989: undrafted

Career history
- Philadelphia Eagles (1989–1990); Phoenix/Arizona Cardinals (1991–1998)

Career NFL statistics
- Receptions: 107
- Receiving yards: 1,478
- Touchdowns: 5
- Stats at Pro Football Reference

Anthony Quinn Edwards (born May 26, 1966) is an American former professional football player who was a wide receiver in the National Football League for the Philadelphia Eagles and the Phoenix/Arizona Cardinals. He played college football for the New Mexico Highlands Cowboys.
