= Steve Lofton =

American football player (born 1968)

Profile
- Position: Cornerback

Personal information
- Born: November 26, 1968 (age 57); Jacksonville, Texas, U.S.

Career information
- College: Texas A&M

Career history
- 1991: Montreal Machine
- 1991–1993: Phoenix Cardinals
- 1994: Cincinnati Bengals
- 1995–1996: Carolina Panthers
- 1997–1998: New England Patriots
- 1998–1999: Carolina Panthers
- Stats at Pro Football Reference

Steve Lofton (born November 26, 1968) is an American former professional football cornerback who played nine seasons in the National Football League (NFL).

Lofton also competed for the Texas A&M Aggies track and field team, where he was an All-American sprinter.
