= Sports law in the United States =

Law and regulations that relate to Sports

Sports law in the United States overlaps substantially with labor law, contract law, competition or antitrust law, and tort law. Issues like defamation and privacy rights are also integral aspects of sports law. This area of law was established as a separate entity only a few decades ago, coinciding with the rise of player-agents and increased media scrutiny of sports law topics.

== Amateur sports law ==
Membership is voluntary. The NCAA operates along a series of bylaws that govern the areas of ethical conduct, amateur eligibility, financial aid, recruiting, gender equity, championship events, and academic standards. The NCAA has enforcement power and can introduce a series of punishments up to the death penalty, the company term for the full shut-down of a sporting activity at an offending college. Coaches are offered contracts and if any contractual agreement is violated NCAA has the right to hold any person(s) under the contract liable.

Title IX is an increasingly important issue in college sports law. The act, passed in 1972, makes it illegal for a federally funded institution to discriminate on the basis of sex or gender. In sports law, the piece of legislation often refers to the effort to achieve equality for women's sports in colleges. The Office of Civil Rights (OCR) is charged with enforcing this legislation. This agency implemented a three-prong test for schools to adhere to:

- Are the opportunities for female and male athletes proportionate to their enrollment?
- Does the school have a history of expanding athletic opportunities for women?
- Has the school demonstrated success in meeting the needs of its students?

In 1995 the Gender in Equity Disclosure Act was passed to require schools to make an annual, public report on male-female athletic participation rates, recruiting by gender, and financial support. The U.S. Supreme Court's decision in Brown University v. Cohen, is an important aspect of litigation for women's sports.

A critical piece of federal legislation, the Amateur Sports Act of 1978 guarantees certain due process rights including hearings and appeals for U.S. athletes under the governance of the USOC and its NGBs.

== Labor issues in sports ==
In 1967, the National Labor Relations Board accepted that players have the right to form unions or players' associations. It is now common for professional athletes to organize into associations or unions in order to negotiate collective bargaining agreements' (CBAs) with their sport's owners. Under federal labor law, players and owners must negotiate mandatory issues, those relating to hours, wages, and working conditions, in good faith. All other issues are deemed "permissive," and do not have to be negotiated. Once a CBA is in place, players agree not to strike and owners promise not to lock out players. By way of example, the 2005 National Hockey League season was cancelled because of an owners' lockout after the parties' CBA had expired. In 1994, Major League Baseball lost half its season and the playoffs because ballplayers went on strike over the issue of a salary cap. Historically, the most controversial issues subject to CBA negotiation are free agency, minimum salary, squad size, draft, salary cap, grounds for termination, and suspension.

In nearly all professional sports, the issue of limits on the use of performance-enhancing drugs has become an integral aspect of CBA negotiations. Drug policies are not uniform for all professional sports. Typically, each CBA explains the policy regarding drug testing, list of banned drugs, violations, penalties, privacy issues, and rights of appeal. Drug violations may lead to suspensions and loss of salary. The BALCO controversy involving high-profile professional athletes and coaches highlights the allegedly widespread use of performance-enhancing drugs in different sports.

Sports agents are generally certified by each sport's players' association. Once certified, agents or contract advisors may negotiate individual player contracts. Agents who are entrusted to conduct business on a player's behalf owe a fiduciary duty, i.e., a duty to remain loyal, act honestly, behave ethically, and act in the player's best interest when negotiating. More than half the states in the United States currently regulate the activities of agents in addition to union regulation for bad acts. Super agents like baseball's Scott Boras and football's Drew Rosenhaus are frequently the subject of media profiles.

The first body to assist agents in learning the ins and outs of contract negotiations, endorsements, and media relations was the Association for Representatives of Athletes (ARPA). The co-founders and leaders of ARPA, since absorbed into the NFL Players Association, were Professor William Weston of the University of Baltimore Law School and Professor Michael E. Jones of the University of Massachusetts Lowell. The late Bob Woolf is acknowledged as being one of the first agents for assisting Boston Red Sox pitcher Earl Wilson to negotiate his player contract.

== Antitrust issues in sports ==
Until a few decades ago, most United States professional sports leagues' contracts retained clauses contracts that essentially prevented players from leaving their original teams by their own choice. These "reserve clauses" were upheld because courts found that these sports leagues did not operate in interstate trade or commerce, meaning they did not fall under antitrust laws. See Federal Baseball Club v. National League (1922). This interpretation has largely been eroded today. However, Major League Baseball may still retain limited antitrust exemptions (it is unclear whether the entire exemption has been overruled by Flood Act because the true extent of the exemption was vague). The formation of players unions for the purpose of negotiating contracts with management is exempt from antitrust scrutiny under labor law. The by-product of good faith negotiations between management and players unions in the form of a CBA is also exempt from antitrust scrutiny.

Antitrust challenges have recently taken the form of other domestic leagues challenging Major League Soccer and the United States Soccer Federation. This occurred in 2017, when the North American Soccer League (NASL) filed a lawsuit against United States Soccer Federation (USSF) following USSF's modification of its divisional requirements and its decision not to renew NASL's status as Division 2 for the 2018 year. NASL's antitrust case was based on MLS's single-entity structure and lack of promotion and relegation, something MLS receives an exemption from FIFA for doing. This was the first time a challenge to single-entity, closed-shop structure was brought by a lower league. NASL sought preliminary injunction against USSF imposing the new requirements, but was denied again on appeal. While preliminary injunction was denied, the case remains pending and may go trial.

In July 2021, a New York court found no violation of antitrust laws when FIFA and USSF set standards blocking foreign clubs from hosting competitive matches in the United States. Friendly and exhibition matches commonly take place in the United States.

== Tort law issues ==
Until recently, torts were never part of the landscape of sports law. A tort can be defined as an actionable wrong However, in 1975 an Illinois appeals court established that players can be found guilty of negligence if their actions are "deliberate, willful, or with a reckless disregard for the safety of another player so as cause injury to that player." See Nabozny v. Barnhill. Negligence torts are typically harder to prove in contact sports, where violent actions and injuries are more common and thus more expected ("assumption of risk" or "self-defense"). Spectators can also sue for negligence if their injuries could not have been expected (not "foreseeable") given the nature of the sporting event they were attending. A baseball fan sitting in the bleachers could reasonably expect a baseball might come toward the seat, but a wrestling fan sitting courtside would not reasonably expect a wrestler to come flying their way.

Sports' tort law extends into other less obvious areas. Team doctors could be liable for medical malpractice, a form of negligence, for giving a player a false clean bill of health so the player may continue to perform. A player who purposefully causes bodily harm to another athlete, coach, or spectator may be guilty of committing an intentional tort along with a criminal act of assault and battery. The law of defamation protects a person's good character or reputation. The publication of false information about a well-known athlete ("public figure") may be actionable if it was published with a reckless disregard for the truth or actual malice. The growth of non-traditional media outlets, e.g. web pages, instant messaging, cable, etc. has added a new dynamic to this area of the law.

In recent years, the topic of concussions in the National Football League has come to the spotlight. Numerous agents, doctors, players, and their families have spoken out about the impact that repeated concussions have had on their [loved one's] life. In 2011, over 4,500 former NFL players "filed a class-action lawsuit against the NFL" in support of allegations that the NFL has downplayed or ignored an unfortunate truth: that NFL players are more at risk of Chronic Traumatic Encephalopathy (CTE) and other forms of brain trauma. In fact, a recent study conducted by Boston University's school of medicine claimed that 99% of the "brains obtained from the NFL" tested positive for CTE. The lawsuit filed against the NFL displays the assumption of risk defense in the law of torts. The NFL uses this doctrine as a defense, stating that the plaintiff (players) knew the risks of their job prior to when the injuries occurred. This doctrine is countered by the prosecution who claim the NFL had the duty to warn, stating that the NFL did not fulfill their duty to warn their players of the full risks associated with playing. This lawsuit was settled in 2015. The NFL was forced to donate $1 billion towards educational programs, payments to retired players, and in-game safety precautions.

Closely related to the subject of torts in some ways is the area of publicity rights. While the tort of defamation protects a person's reputation, the right of publicity permits a person to commercially exploit their likeness, name, and image. This area of sports law includes trademarks, trade-names, domain names, and copyrights.

== Outside the United States ==
International amateur sports are run by a variety of organizations. The International Olympic Committee (IOC) is made up of each country's Olympic Committee, which in turn recognizes a national governing body (NGB) for each Olympic related sport. The United States Olympic Committee (USOC) is the national governing body for all U.S. athletes in the Olympic and Pan-American Games. The IOC is the international governing body for the summer and winter Olympic Games.

Labor issues are not unique to United States law. The European Union has dealt with countless sports-related legal issues. The most important development in this area was the Bosman ruling, in which the European Court of Justice invalidated restrictions imposed by EU member countries and UEFA (the governing body for football within Europe) on foreign EU nationals. Bosman was extended to countries with associate trading relationships with the EU by the Kolpak ruling. The 6+5 rule was a proposed rule by FIFA that sought to limit the effects of Bosman and its offshoots on football clubs; it sparked considerable legal controversy in Europe and was abandoned in 2010.

The subject of drug testing, especially in international sports like cycling and track and field, is under the jurisdiction of each sport's NGB and international federation, the USOC, the IOC, and the World Anti-Doping Agency. The final arbitrator in resolving drug related disputes is the Court of Arbitration for Sports.

Australia

The capacity for the law of assault to intervene in contact sports is limited by the athlete's willing participation. By engaging in a sport, participants are held to accepted the inherent risks of such an activity as applied in Rootes v Shelton.

However, questions of legality arise where the conduct was deliberate as was the case in McCracken v Melbourne Storm & Orcs, where Melbourne Storm players sought to intentionally injure McCracken during play. Similarly, issues also arise where conduct can be characterised to fall "outside the scope of the Plaintiff's consent to degree of physical contact during the game", thus invoking compensation.

== See also ==
- International Association of Sports Law
- Jock tax
