= Junípero Serra High School (Gardena, California) =

Private school in Gardena, California, United States

Location
- 14830 South Van Ness Avenue; Gardena, (Los Angeles County), California 90249; United States; 33°53′48″N 118°19′3″W

Information
- School type: Private Private
- Motto: "You Shall Be My Witnesses"
- Religious affiliations: Roman Catholic; Marianists (1950–1994) (2014–present)
- Patron saint: St Junipero Serra
- Established: 1950
- School code: 051025
- President: John Moran
- Principal: Nadi Wissa
- Grades: 9–12
- Campus: 24 acres (97,000 m2)
- Colors: Royal Blue and Scarlet
- Fight song: Hail to the Red & Blue
- Athletics conference: CIF Southern Section; Camino Del Rey Association
- Nickname: Cavaliers & Lady Cavaliers
- Rival: Chaminade College Preparatory
- Accreditation: Western Association of Schools and Colleges
- Newspaper: The Cavalier
- Yearbook: El Padre
- Annual tuition: St. Serra Plan ($10,500 - 11,100); Cavalier Plan ($11,400 - $12,000); International Plan ($18,000)
- Athletic Director: Kirk Bertrand
- Director of Advancement: Joseph D. Cormier '81
- Website: www.la-serrahs.org

Established in 1950, Junípero Serra High School is a four-year, private coeducational Catholic college preparatory school in Gardena, California, United States. Honored as a California State School of the Year, Serra is operated by the Roman Catholic Archdiocese of Los Angeles.

== School History ==
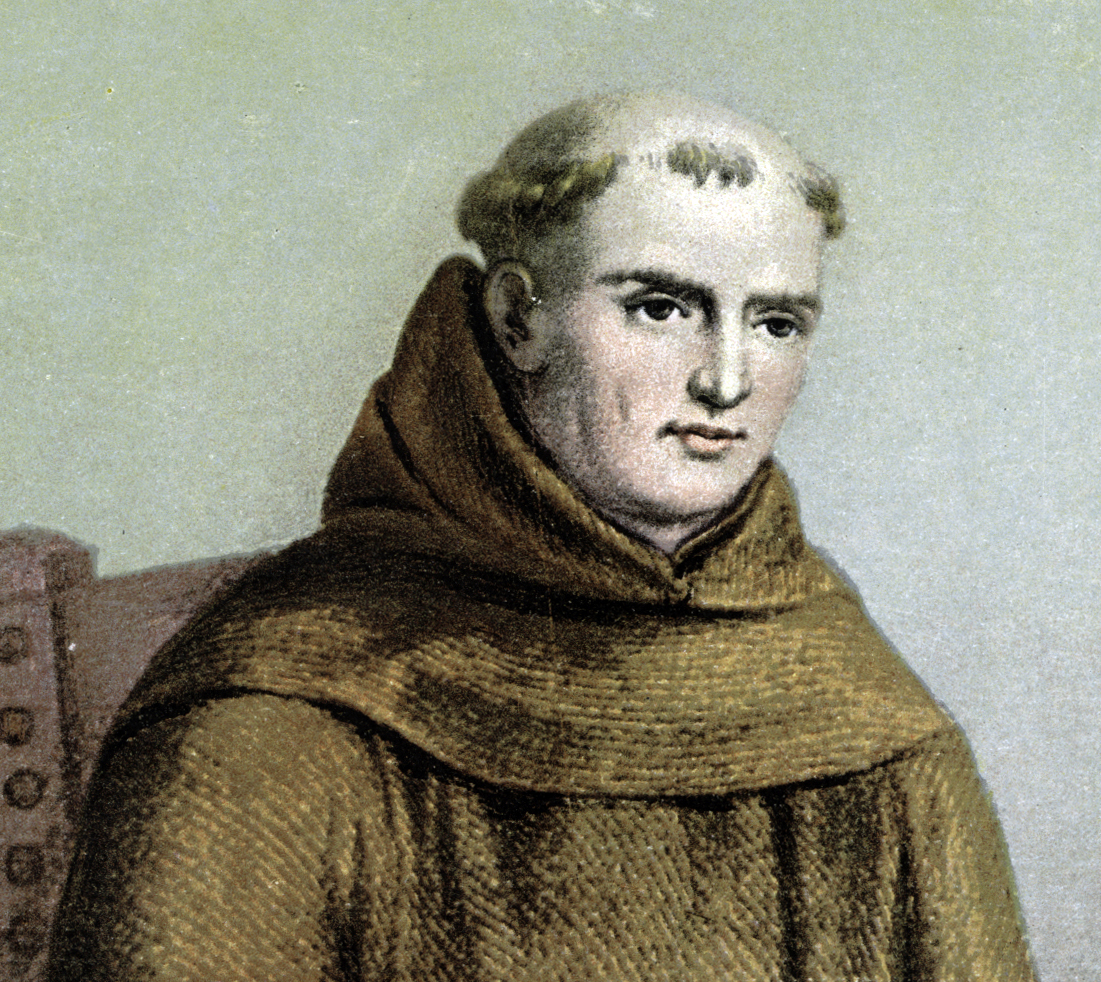
The school is named for Californian missionary Saint Junípero Serra.

Junípero Serra High School was founded by James Francis Cardinal McIntyre and the Society of Mary (Marianists) as an all boys school in the South Bay section of Los Angeles. In 1991, Serra expanded its student body and admitted female students for the first time.

Serra High is named in honor of Saint Junípero Serra Ferrer, a patron saint who opened several Spanish missions throughout California.

== Admissions ==
Serra ranks among the top 20% of private schools in California. Serra admissions is determined by a placement examination, personal evaluation, and elementary and middle school grades.

Serra is accredited by the Western Association of Schools and Colleges (ACS WASC Accreditation Code: 19 99938 999); Western Catholic Educational Association, the College Board, California Scholarship Federation, and the National Catholic Educational Association.

== Academics ==
As a college-preparatory school, nearly 100% of Serra graduates go directly to higher education. The most recent graduating class had 100% college acceptance: 89.6% to four-year and 10.3% to two-year.

All students are required to complete eight semesters each of English and religion; six semesters each of mathematics and social studies, four semesters each of laboratory science and foreign language; two semesters each of visual performing arts, physical education with health and college-preparatory elective. Eighty hours of community service are also required in order to graduate.

The Serra English Department creates writing manuals using students' works and has a long history of welcoming distinguished writers to campus. Pulitzer Prize winning author Alex Haley visited the Serra campus to keynote the launch of the school's capital campaign, and Serra alumnus and poet Dana Gioia, the former chairman of the National Endowment of the Arts, delivered a motivational talk to students.

The Serra Science Department includes the Space Team that designs 3D-printing experiments for the International Space Station (ISS). In 2024, the team's most recent experiment launched aboard SpaceX CRS-30 and docked two days later on the ISS. Serra is one of only nine high schools in the U.S. selected to participate in the ISS program.

The Serra Drama/Theatre Department received a foundation grant to support performing arts opportunities for students.

Several Serra academic departments and the space team benefit from the support of The Ahmanson Foundation, which has donated more than one million dollars to Serra for the purchase of computers, iPads, and projectors, Wi-Fi and server campus updgrades, and to provide student scholarships.

== Campus ==
The Serra campus sits on a twenty-four acre plot that at the time of the school's founding was land that was being used as a truck garden with a field of cabbages.

The Serra football and track and field teams host home games and meets at the Kretschmar Stadium. In November 2024, a fire destroyed parts of the stadium's press box and the upper row bleachers.

The boys and girls basketball teams play at the Dwan D. Hurt Memorial Gymnasium, which is named in honor of Hurt, a former Serra basketball coach and alumnus, who died in his sleep in 2016. A group of Serra alumni and friends sponsored construction project build a foyer on the north side of the gymnasium to showcase Serra's team awards, banners, plaques, and trophies, in celebration of the school's athletic accomplishments.

== Athletics ==
=== CIF, League, and State Championships ===
The Serra Cavaliers have won at least twelve California State team titles in basketball, football, and track and field, and have won numerous league, regional, and CIF championships in a variety of sports.

- Baseball
  - CIF Southern Section Champions: 2013 (Division III)
- Basketball (Boys)
  - California State Champions: 1993 (Division IV), 2010 (Division III)
  - CIF Southern Section Champions: 1993, 1999, 2000, 2006, 2010, 2012, 2013, 2016
- Basketball (Girls)
  - California State Champions: 2013 (Division IV), 2018 (Division II)
  - CIF Southern Section Champions: 2010, 2011, 2012
- Cross Country (Boys)
- Football
  - California State Champions: 1989, 2009 (Division III), 2012 (Division II), 2021 (Division 1-A);
  - CIF Champions: 1989, 2009 (Division III, Southern California), 2010 (Division II, Southern California), 2012 (Division II, Southern California), 2021 (Division I-A, Southern California)
  - Summer Passing Championships: 2024
- Golf (Boys)
- Soccer (Boys)(Girls)
- Softball
  - CIF Southern Section Champions: 2018;
- Swimming (Boys)
  - CIF Southern Section (Division 4) Medalist, 2016
- Track and Field (Boys)
  - California State Champions: 2000, 2013;
  - CIF Southern Section Champions: 1980, 1981, 1982, 1994, 1996, 1997, 1998, 1999, 2000, 2002, 2003, 2004, 2005, 2007, 2008, 2009, 2010, 2011, 2012, 2013; 2022 (Division 4); 2025 (Division 4)
- Track and Field (Girls)
  - California State Champions: 2012, 2018
  - CIF Southern Section Champions: 2003 (first CIF Girls Title for Serra), 2009, 2010, 2011, 2012, 2018; 2022 (Division 4)
- Volleyball (Boys)(Girls)

=== Cal-Hi Sports School of the Year ===
Serra became the first high school in California history to win both state football and basketball titles in the same academic year. Serra was named "2009–2010 State School of the Year" by Cal-Hi Sports, and based on school enrollment, Serra is the smallest school to ever receive this honor and the first State School of the Year recipient from the South Bay region of Los Angeles since the 1960s.

== Notable alumni ==
Since the first graduating class in 1953, Serra alumni have made contributions to the arts, business, entertainment, law, military, politics, technology, and professional sports.

=== Arts and entertainment ===
- Arabian Prince, rapper, former N.W.A. member
- Dana Gioia, former chairman, National Endowment for the Arts; and former California Poet Laureate
- Montell Jordan, hip hop, R&B recording artist
- Terrence Quaites, R&B recording artist with Cash Money Records, and entrepreneur
- Skeme, rapper, performer

=== Athletics ===
- Current and/or former Canadian Football League (CFL) players: David Williams
- Current and/or former High School Coaches of the Year: Dwan Hurt '81 (basketball)
- Current and/or former Israeli Basketball Premier League players: Dakarai Tucker
- Current and/or former Major League Baseball (MLB) players: Dave Nelson, Dominic Smith, Marcus Wilson
- Current and/or former National Basketball Association (NBA) players: Kerry Boagni, Pooh Jeter, Milt Palacio
- Current and/or former National Football League (NFL) coaches and coordinators: Clayton Lopez, Kris Richard
- Current and/or former National Football League (NFL) players: Bené Benwikere, Joseph D. Cormier, George Farmer, Deon Figures, DaJohn Harris, Carl Ihenacho, Duke Ihenacho, Adoree Jackson, John Jackson (wide receiver, born 1999), Jordan Lasley, Marqise Lee, Jemeel Powell, Eugene Profit, Kris Richard, Paul Richardson, Nehemiah Shelton, Jashon Sykes, Theo Viltz, David Williams, Robert Woods
- Khary Wilder, college football defensive end (Ohio State), 2026

=== Business ===
- Gary E. Liebl '59, Chair (ret.), QLogic; Chairman Emeritus, Chaminade University of Honolulu; Life Governor, Chapman University
- William Melville, founder, president and CEO (retired), Mayfair Plastics
- Eugene Profit '81, CEO, Profit Investment Management; former NFL cornerback

=== Military ===
- Brigadier General Michael J. Aguilar, (USMC) (ret.), Federal Security Director, San Diego International Airport
