= Keith McCants =

American football player (1968–2021)

No. 52, 78, 90
- Positions: Linebacker, defensive end

Personal information
- Born: April 19, 1968; Mobile, Alabama, U.S.
- Died: September 2, 2021 (aged 53); St. Petersburg, Florida, U.S.
- Listed height: 6 ft 3 in (1.91 m)
- Listed weight: 260 lb (118 kg)

Career information
- High school: Murphy (Mobile)
- College: Alabama
- NFL draft: 1990: 1st round, 4th overall pick

Career history
- Tampa Bay Buccaneers (1990–1992); New England Patriots (1993)*; Houston Oilers (1993–1994); Arizona Cardinals (1994); St. Louis Rams (1995)*; Arizona Cardinals (1995)
- * Offseason or practice squad member only

Awards and highlights
- Unanimous All-American (1989); First-team All-SEC (1989); CBS National Defensive Player of the Year (1989); Iron Bowl MVP (1989); 1988 Sun Bowl champion

Career NFL statistics
- Tackles: 192
- Sacks: 13.5
- Touchdowns: 2
- Stats at Pro Football Reference

Alvin Keith McCants (April 19, 1968 – September 2, 2021) was an American professional football player who was a linebacker for six seasons in the National Football League (NFL) for the Tampa Bay Buccaneers, the Houston Oilers, and the Arizona Cardinals from 1990 to 1995. He played college football for the Alabama Crimson Tide, earning unanimous All-American honors in 1989. He was selected by Tampa Bay in the first round of the 1990 NFL draft with the fourth overall pick. After his playing career, he became a radio broadcaster.

== Early life ==
McCants attended Murphy High School in Mobile, Alabama. As a senior, he amassed 130 tackles and 3 interceptions and was named to the 1986 1st Team All State Team. Additionally, McCants was named to the 1986 Alabama Sports Writers Association's Super 12 team, composed of the top 12 high school football players in the state. McCants was also on the school's basketball team, and helped lead them to the state tournament both his freshman and senior year.

== College career ==
A college standout at the University of Alabama, McCants had a number of accolades bestowed upon him including being named a 1989 Unanimous First-team All-American (AP, UPI, WCFF, AFCA, FWAA, FN, TSN) and a 1989 Butkus Award Runner-up. He was a member of the 1990 Sugar Bowl team and was named the National Defensive Player of the Year in 1989 by CBS. In 1988 as a sophomore, McCants finished second on the team with 78 tackles, second only to Derrick Thomas. Additionally, McCants recorded the most tackles on the team four times during the 1988 regular season, against Tennessee (8), Mississippi State (14), Auburn (17), and Texas A&M (11). The Texas A&M game, dubbed the Hurricane Bowl, was originally to take place September 17, but Alabama head coach Bill Curry refused to travel to College Station due to the threat posed by Hurricane Gilbert. The Tide ended the season with a win against Army in the 1988 Sun Bowl, in which McCants had a game-high 13 tackles.

In 1989, he led the Crimson Tide with 119 tackles and 4 sacks. After Alabama's victory against Tennessee, McCants was named the SEC Defensive Player of the Week by the league office for his 16 tackles and two sacks. Three weeks later, he was named Sports Illustrated defensive player of the week after totaling 18 tackles in an Alabama victory over LSU. In the last game of the 1989 regular season against Auburn, dubbed the Iron Bowl, McCants was named the CBS Player of the Game for Alabama with 18 tackles, an interception, and a forced fumble. A high point for the Tide from the game was McCants' display of "incredible athletic talent" in running down Auburn receiver Shane Wasden from behind and preventing a touchdown. Additionally, it was the second straight Iron Bowl in which McCants led the Tide in tackles, combining for 35 total between the 1988 and 1989 matchups. Even with the loss to Auburn, Alabama would still claim the title of 1989 SEC Champions, the school’s first conference title since 1981.

Among a number of individual honors, McCants finished his college career with 197 total tackles, including 16 tackles for a loss. Additionally, McCants 119 tackles that year puts him tied for 6th all time for tackles in a single season by an Alabama player. The February 12, 1990, issue of Sports Illustrated ran an article that focused on McCants titled "The Young and the Restless", that profiled his and other college juniors' eventually successful attempts to declare for the NFL Draft before their senior season, a then-uncommon practice. In December 2010, Bleacher Report named McCants the 33rd greatest player in Alabama Crimson Tide History.

Before the draft, Ed Sherman of the Chicago Tribune described McCants as "the biggest star around", with pro scouts "drooling over him", and projected him to be "a virtual lock to be the top pick in next spring`s NFL draft". `BAMA STAR WEIGHS THE PROS, CONS

== Professional career ==
McCants was for a time expected to be the first player selected in the 1990 NFL draft, but the Atlanta Falcons backed off due to rumors of knee trouble and allegations that his family had been paid money by a sports agent while he was still in college. Still, McCants' strength and 4.51 second time in the 40-yard dash guaranteed he would still be a high pick, if not #1. After being drafted fourth overall by the Buccaneers in 1990, McCants signed a 5-year, $7.4 million deal with the team, including a then-record $2.5 million cash signing bonus. A highly touted prospect, McCants rookie card by Score quoted former Kentucky head coach Jerry Claiborne as saying "Keith is one of the best football players I have ever seen. Have you ever seen a linebacker as big as he is? I never have. He looks like an elephant and he runs like a deer". Buccaneers coach Ray Perkins said that "He plays like he is never out of the play. That is an intensity level I like".

Floyd Peters was brought to the Bucs in 1991, and converted McCants from a linebacker to defensive end. Although McCants resisted the change, Peters convinced him that with time he could become a success story along the lines of Chris Doleman, another Peters conversion. Although privately unhappy he accepted the position, and tried to make the best of it, claiming "Teams won't take me lightly. I can tell you that...I can play any position on this football team, except maybe quarterback. When this season is over, I could be in the Pro Bowl. You don't know how hungry I am. It doesn't matter what position I'm playing. What matters is me."

Although McCants was not fond of the move, he did have some success, as he led the Buccaneers in 1991 with 34 quarterback pressures and recorded 5 sacks, prompting Patrick Zier of the New York Times to remark "considering the circumstances, McCants first year was a success. . .despite having to learn an entirely new position". In December 1991, Coach Peters told the media "I think he's played a decent season. If you watch films, Keith is a producer." McCants continued to build upon his experience and was second on the Buccaneers in sacks (5) and quarterback pressures (21) in 1992. Eventually, Tampa Bay cut him during their 1993 training camp.

Within 48 hours, he was picked up off waivers by the New England Patriots, where he was reunited once again with Ray Perkins, then New England's Offensive coordinator. Regarding his cut from the Bucs and resigning, McCants remarked at the time "This is a lot off my shoulders...The rumors had been spreading for some time now concerning my future with Tampa." He played in a preseason game the day he was signed, against the Kansas City Chiefs, before being released.

In 1993 while with the Houston Oilers, McCants stepped in to separate Buddy Ryan and Kevin Gilbride when Ryan punched Gilbride in the face following an Oilers fumble. That season, the Oilers would go on to finish first in the AFC Central Division, sending them to their seventh straight postseason, and McCants's first. When asked what it meant to go to the playoffs, McCants replied, "Let me tell you something, this is big-time. This is football ... I haven't had a winning season since I left college, and it feels great to win again." In 1994, McCants went to the Cardinals, following Buddy Ryan to Arizona after he was named head coach. In a game against the Chicago Bears, McCants picked off Steve Walsh and ran back a 46-yard touchdown; it was the Cardinals' longest interception return of the season. In 1995 McCants scored his second NFL touchdown, on a fumble recovery against the Seattle Seahawks.

=== NFL statistics ===
Year	Team	Games	Comb. Tkls.	Tackles	Asst. Tkls.	Sacks	Forced Fmb.	Fumb Rec.	Fumb Ret Yds	Int	Int Ret Yds.	Yards per Ret.	Long Ret.	Int Ret. Touchdown	Pass Def.
1990	TB	15	44	44	0	2.0	0	1	0	0	0	0	0	0	0
1991	TB	16	54	54	0	5.0	0	1	0	0	0	0	0	0	0
1992	TB	16	58	58	0	5.0	0	1	0	0	0	0	0	0	0
1993	HOU	13	4	4	0	0.0	0	0	0	0	0	0	0	0	0
1994	HOU	4	20	17	3	0.0	0	0	0	0	0	0	0	0	0
1994	ARI	8	15	14	1	1.0	0	1	0	1	46	46	46	1	3
1995	ARI	16	20	17	3	0.5	0	2	16	0	0	0	0	0	2
Career		88	192	184	8	13.5	0	6	16	1	46	46	46	1	5

== Broadcast career ==
On September 13, 2019, McCants began cohosting Hear It Now! with Barry Edwards every Friday on WWBA (820 AM) in Tampa Bay. This was his first full-time role as a broadcaster. He interviewed guests Cornelius Bennett, Robert Jones, Stylez G. White, George Teague, Willie Anderson, Kato Kaelin and Ron Jeremy.

== Personal life ==
McCants and Emmitt Smith became friends while both playing in the SEC in college, with both being named to the 1989 All American team. Smith twice called McCants for advice leading up to his decision to announce for the 1990 Draft. According to his biography, while still a child WNBA player Lindsey Harding was inspired by a footrace with McCants to enter the world of sports.

After leaving the NFL, McCants, who studied Criminal Justice while at the University of Alabama, became the first black marine police officer in the state of Alabama. Working for the Department of Conservation and Natural resources, Conservation Commissioner Riley Boykin Smith said at the time that "he hopes McCants will become the first of many minorities who take advantage of the opportunities to work for his department".

McCants was also an avid scuba diver, having dived all around the coast of Florida and the Caribbean.

McCants died of an apparent drug overdose on September 2, 2021, aged 53.

== Media appearances ==
McCants appeared in the 2012 episode Broke, part of ESPN's 30 for 30 series of sports documentaries. The premiere of Broke, which detailed the high rates of bankruptcy and financial trouble amongst professional athletes, attracted 2.7 million viewers, an all-time ESPN record.

McCants was a semi-frequent guest on HuffPost Live, having appeared on the program five times. Three of the appearances were with host Marc Lamont Hill.

McCants was the guest for the September 21, 2012, episode of Dan Lebatard is Highly Questionable.

On September 24, 2012, he appeared as a guest on The Adam Carolla Show alongside Jeff Timmons of 98 Degrees.

In December 2012, McCants appeared on Tailgating with Kato, Kato Kaelin's sports-themed television talk show

He also appeared on WALA-TV Fox 10 a number of times, with segments including "The Interview" and "Studio 10".

McCants was featured in sportswriter Gregg Easterbrook's book The King of Sports: Football's Impact on America released in October 2013.

== Legal troubles ==
According to a May 15, 2011, Tampa Tribune article, since 2002 McCants had three convictions on charges of possessing drugs or drug paraphernalia. The article goes on to detail how, since his last new arrest in December 2010, "McCants said he has been clean and doesn't believe he has a drug-addiction problem."
