= Personal finances of professional American athletes =

The personal finances of professional American athletes is a subject of widespread discussion due to the often high salaries of such athletes and the high rates of personal bankruptcy and other financial distress.

According to a 2009 Sports Illustrated article, 35% of National Football League (NFL) players are either bankrupt or are under financial stress within two years of retirement and an estimated 60% of National Basketball Association (NBA) players, 78% of NFL players, and a large percentage of Major League Baseball (MLB) players (4x that of the average U.S. citizen) go bankrupt within five years after leaving their sport. Originally the statement "60% of NBA players go bankrupt within five years after leaving their sport" was released by a representative of the NBA Players' Association in 2008. A Fortune magazine article states, however, that a working paper from the National Bureau of Economic Research found that the percentage of NFL players who go bankrupt after two years is a much smaller 1.9%, climbing to 15.7% after 12 years.

== History ==
As of 1911 the average salary for the about 500 players in Major League Baseball was slightly more than $2,000 a season ($69,100 today). The star hitter Ty Cobb received $9,000 a season ($311,000 today), and sold automobiles in the off season. While Cobb encouraged young men to play professionally, top pitcher Christy Mathewson—who had made more money as a player than Cobb—warned, "Keep out of baseball unless you are sure of being a star!" He stated that the average player did not make enough over a ten-year career to justify devoting those years to the sport.

By 1941, Hank Greenberg was the highest-paid player in baseball, earning $55,000 a season ($1,203,900 today). Stan Musial's $80,000 a season ($969,900 today) was the highest in 1952, while young star Mickey Mantle earned $10,000 a season ($121,200 today). Musial, like Cobb, supplemented his income; he owned a restaurant.

== Players' vulnerabilities ==
Baseball outfielder Torii Hunter brought up another obstacle: "Once you get into the financial stuff, and it sounds like Japanese, guys are just like, 'I ain't going back.' They're lost."

Players encourage each other to spend lavishly. Rod Strickland explained, "For rookies, it's like an unspoken initiation ... You're trying to get in good with the veterans, so you go beyond your means." Friends and strangers become part of their entourages. Retired basketball center Danny Schayes stated, "Guys go broke because they surround themselves with people who help them go broke".

An additional problem is that players owe jock taxes in many different jurisdictions, and be a citizen of one country but a legal resident of another.

== Length of careers ==
"There's a far shorter peak earnings period than in any other profession". Black Enterprise reported in 2003 that "the average career span for professional basketball, football, and baseball is a mere 4.5 years, 3.2 years, and under five years, respectively." A 2007 study found that, excluding pitchers, rookie Major League Baseball players' careers last for 5.6 years on average.

== Managers and investments ==
Magic Johnson said, "They hire these people not because of expertise but because they're friends. Well, they'll fail." Rod Strickland made his father his business manager. The older Strickland checked out a real estate deal from a "friend of a close friend" of Rod's, but not well enough to avoid a costly blunder.

Hockey Hall of Famer Bobby Orr received deceitful treatment from Alan Eagleson, who "as Orr's agent, left him all but broke as part of one of sports' most spectacular financial scandals."

Karl Malone, another Basketball Hall of Famer has said, "You get in trouble when you let a lot of people close to you . . . I've made my share of mistakes. You've got to learn from them."

== Spouses, children and divorce ==
When asked by one of his players "What's the most dangerous thing that could happen to us financially?", Carolina Panthers majority owner Jerry Richardson replied immediately, "Divorce." The money stops flowing in. Without a prenuptial agreement, Michael Jordan's $168 million divorce settlement was at the time the largest ever. On the other hand, Dikembe Mutombo canceled his wedding, when his fiancee refused to sign one the day before the ceremony.

Another factor is the sexual opportunities available to athletes during their careers. Players end up being responsible for child support. Shawn Kemp had at least seven children with six women, Derrick Thomas seven with five, Jon Kilgore fifteen with four, and Travis Henry nine with nine. Henry was imprisoned for non-payment of an estimated $170,000 annually.

== Education ==
The National Football League offers its players a Financial Education Program. "The non-credit seminars are offered during the year and teach players about cash management, insurance, tax planning, retirement planning and other related topics." There is also a more advanced NFL Business Management and Entrepreneurial Program, with "custom programs at top-rated business schools".

Toronto Metropolitan University's Ted Rogers School of Management offers a program called Breakaway, which aims to help players in their transition away from professional hockey and other sports.

Education can often be overlooked by professional athletes, once they have made it to their desired sports league. This is a major concern because many professional athletes have no funds or career options to fall back on. Without a college degree, higher education, or in some instances even a high school diploma; there are limited options to explore in the world outside of athletics. Well established athletes like Shaquille O'Neal and Ray Lewis have gone back to receive their college degrees, despite their incredible success in their respected athletic professions. One side of the argument says that college athletics and the educational institutions often do not succeed in accommodating their student athletes for their future endeavors outside of sports, and that the overall relationship between schools and athletes can be perceived as commercial, rather than educational.

In college athletics, such as basketball and football, coaches appear to control athletes in and out of season of their respected sport. With incredibly demanding schedules that almost always requires players to miss classes to focus on their athletic performance, one side of the argument is that it can be difficult to state that schools implement policies and coaches that respect athletics and education equally at a university. Universities have been able to counter these arguments by complying with NCAA rules on limits of practice time and extracurricular activities for the sport that do not pertain to the classroom. Universities often argue that not only do these athletes receive an opportunity of a higher education that they might not have necessarily been able to receive, but that these skills enhance competitive drive, discipline, and teamwork skills in future work settings. Scholarships often provide opportunities for those who may not have gotten into a university, based on previous academic performance or financial status, have been one of the central arguments for universities justifying their athletic standing and policies. Additional arguments now cite the importance of the synergies in the valuable knowledge and experience gained on the field and how these skills are applied in the workplace. In a study done about the mean attribution of life skills to the sport experience, 75% of former athletes who were participants stated that there were major life skills associated with sports that transferred to their working lives. This study analyzed different types of experiential learning, and found that these were often experiential skills that were learned through playing sports that included what ranged from leadership to goal setting. These arguments may more commonly come up to defend universities for implementing high standards in athletic performance. Regardless of these allegations against universities, education is extremely valuable to professional athletes because the average athlete rarely has a long tenure and cannot make their income last for a sustained period of time.

Some believe that the universities are not to blame, and that students often pave their own path. In a survey consisting of previous student athletes, athletic performance and effort was attributed to helping the development of major life skills, especially in the work force. However, this can change from person to person, and social theorists even believe that roles and identities contribute heavily to where a person is headed in life. There are some athletes, whose personality caters to working incredibly hard on the field, rather than off the field, thus developing more of an athletic identity that can get in the way of a career path or education. The same goes with those who have passions in education or some other activity, making student athletes think very differently from one another.

== Successes ==
=== Basketball ===
Basketball Hall of Famer Magic Johnson is notable as an example of an athlete who has parlayed his sporting career into significant business ventures, building a diversified commercial portfolio beyond his athletic earnings. He was at one time a part owner of the Los Angeles Lakers, and his company, Magic Johnson Enterprises, has a net worth of $700 million. In 2012, he was a minority partner in a group that bought the Los Angeles Dodgers.

Michael Jordan has proven almost as successful in his post-basketball business ventures, despite a temporary financial setback due to his divorce. He has numerous business interests, most notably his own line of apparel through Nike. In March 2010, he became the majority owner of the Charlotte Bobcats, now known as the Charlotte Hornets, after buying out most of the interest of founding owner Bob Johnson for $275 million.

Another Hall of Famer, Karl Malone, was involved in a substantial number of business ventures during his NBA career, with his involvement both expanding and diversifying since his retirement. A 2012 story in the Deseret News of Salt Lake City, where he played almost all of his NBA career, listed his current ventures. Among these are new- and used-car dealerships in the Salt Lake City area; a cattle ranch and substantial timber property in his home state of Louisiana; restaurants in Louisiana, Utah and Idaho; a commercial development company; a deer-raising venture; and an outfitting business.

John Havlicek used his NBA earnings to invest in an up-and-coming fast food chain. When Wendy's became a major success, it left Havlicek with enough income to retire comfortably.

=== Baseball ===
Hall of Fame pitcher Nolan Ryan has proven successful in business, though not at the level of Johnson or Jordan. After the end of his playing career in 1993, he was majority owner and chairman of a bank in his home town of Alvin, Texas before selling his interest in 2005. He also became part owner of two minor-league teams in his home state, the Corpus Christi Hooks and Round Rock Express. In 2010, he was the public face of, and a minority investor in, a group that bought the Texas Rangers, the team with which he finished his Major League Baseball playing career. He owned a controlling interest in the team until late 2013, when he sold his stake after differences with the majority partners of the Rangers. He is also a lifelong cattle rancher and the CEO of Nolan Ryan Beef, which supplies retail outlets and restaurants with grass-fed beef.

=== Football ===
Former Washington Redskins cornerback Eugene Profit parlayed his Yale economics education into a successful financial career. His company, Profit Investment Management, has $2 billion in assets under management.

Former Denver Broncos quarterback and Pro Football Hall of Fame member John Elway used his football earnings to launch a chain of automotive dealerships and steakhouses.

== Mixed results ==
Another athlete turned successful businessman, at least for a time, was former football safety Dave Duerson, president and CEO of Duerson Foods L.L.C. However, an expansion of his company turned into financial disaster due to issues with a supplier of freezers for a meat processing plant. Duerson Foods won a $34 million judgment against the freezer company in 2004, but never collected because the company later filed for bankruptcy, and Duerson himself filed for bankruptcy in September 2010. Duerson's story turned far more tragic, as he committed suicide in February 2011, and a post-mortem examination of his brain revealed he was suffering from what was described as a "moderately advanced" case of chronic traumatic encephalopathy, presumably from constant blows to the head during his football career.

Hall of Fame basketball player Dave Bing established a steel processing company, Bing Steel, in Detroit in 1980. After Bing Steel suffered a loss in its first year of operation, Bing decided to shift his company from manufacturing to being a middleman. Bing Steel became profitable in its second year of operation, and has since expanded to become the Bing Group, a conglomerate involved in a number of businesses, including supplying the automotive industry. However, it has been recently announced that the Bing Group is heavily in debt and is in process of being sold. Most of his holdings have either gone bankrupt or been dissolved.

== Failures ==
Kenny Anderson was broke the day he left the NBA, despite earning $63 million in salary. After filing for bankruptcy, he became a K-12 school teacher.

Jack Clark filed for bankruptcy twice, in 1992 and 2018, the latter with his wife.

Lenny Dykstra filed for bankruptcy in 2009.

Evander Holyfield, despite earning $250 million as a heavyweight boxing champion, lost his $10 million, 54,000 square foot, 109 room Atlanta mansion to a 2008 bank foreclosure.

Allen Iverson told a Georgia judge in February 2012 that he was flat broke and could not pay an $860k jewelry debt. Iverson earned $154 million in salary and $30–50 million in endorsements during his career. He was known to travel with a 50-person entourage, lost millions of dollars gambling, lavished friends with expensive gifts and had massive monthly child support obligations.

Warren Sapp filed for bankruptcy in April 2012, claiming assets worth $6.5 million and debts of $7 million. The $7 million is owed to the IRS, child support to four different women, and medical bills.

Sheryl Swoopes earned an estimated $50 million playing basketball, and declared bankruptcy in 2004, owing $711,050. Swoopes admitted, "I didn't surround myself with the right people. I got in a position where it was like, 'Oh, wow, what happened?'"

Mike Tyson earned an estimated $400 million over his career, but declared bankruptcy in 2003.

Antoine Walker earned $108 million in salary while playing in the NBA, but had to declare bankruptcy in 2010, listing assets of $5 million and debts of $13 million thanks to bad real estate investments and gambling debts.

Vince Young went broke, despite $45 million in salary and endorsements.

Rajon Rondo has been described as "financially abusive" by the mother of his child Ashley Bachelor despite career earnings of $117,897,637 as of 2021.
