= International Association of Sports Law =

- Abbreviation: IASL
- Formation: 1992
- Type: INGO
- Region served: Worldwide
- Official language: English
- Website: IASL Official website

International Association of Sports Law (IASL) is an international scientific association founded during the 1st International Congress on Sports Law, held on 11–13 December 1992 in Athens, Greece. The association is based in Olympia, Greece, and has since been active in administrative matters in Athens as well as in its country of origin.

== Objective ==
The objective of the IASL is to promote the development of research and teaching in sports law and the institution of the Olympic Games. The association's aims include conducting studies, collecting international sports jurisprudence, and providing programming and consultative activities in the legislative, administrative, organisational, and practical aspects of sports law and the Olympic Games.

== Members ==
IASL members may be natural and/or legal persons who actively participate in the research, teaching, and practical application of sports law, as well as in matters relating to the institution of the Olympic Games.

== Congress ==
IASL has organised more than 15 international congresses. Selected recent and upcoming congresses include the following:

=== 14th International Congress ===
The 14th International Congress was scheduled to take place at the University of Athens (Central Building), where IASL was founded in 1992, and at the Hotel Titania, from 28 to 29 November 2008. The official languages of the congress were English, French, and Greek. The proceedings and findings of the congress were to be published by the HCRSL (EKEAD) in a special edition, with selected papers appearing in the International Sports Law Review/Pandektis.

=== 13th International Congress ===
The 13th International Congress was held from 14 to 15 November 2007 in the main auditorium of Torre del Caballito in Mexico City, which houses offices of the Senate of the Mexican Republic. The general topics included sports legal order, sports law regulation, national sports law, conflicts of sports jurisdiction, arbitration of sports disputes, violence and racism in sport, doping, and sports law case studies.

=== 12th International Congress ===
The 12th IASL Conference on Legal Aspects of Professional Sports was held from 23 to 25 November 2006 in Ljubljana. The conference was attended by members of the board of directors and IASL members. During the proceedings on 24 and 25 November, 22 speakers presented papers addressing developments in sports law from both international and national legal perspectives.

=== 11th International Congress ===
The 11th IASL Congress took place in Johannesburg, South Africa, from 28 to 30 November 2005. The general theme was "Fighting Abuse in Sports". Topics discussed included child abuse in sport, unfair discrimination, hooliganism, ambush marketing and commercial exploitation of athletes, doping, drug abuse, genetic engineering, and the relationship between politics and sport.

=== 10th International Congress ===
The 10th IASL Conference on Legal Aspects of Professional Sports was held from 25 to 27 November 2004 in Athens. The congress focused on the theme "Sports Law: Implementation and the Olympic Games", reflecting the relevance of the topic in the context of the Olympic Games held in Athens in 2004.

=== 9th International Congress ===
The 9th IASL Congress was held on 25 and 26 September 2003 in Milwaukee, Wisconsin, United States. The general theme was "International Sports Law and Business in the 21st Century". Sessions addressed topics such as sports facility financing, development, and safety, Olympic and European stadium issues; international player restraints and competition law, drug testing in sports; resolution of sports disputes; global movement of sports franchises; and athlete rights.

== Sports law publications ==
IASL members publish books, articles, and studies related to sports law. These publications address sports relations at both national and international levels, as well as sports organisations, including their legal status and the laws governing their operation. Studies on labour relations in sport and articles concerning the legal framework of the Olympic Games are also included in the volumes of the International Sports Law Review – Pandektis.

=== Pandektis ===
The official journal of the IASL is the International Sports Law Review – Pandektis, which is published twice per year and bound as a volume every two years. The journal is directed by an editorial committee chaired by Dimitrios P. Panagiotopoulos, Professor at the University of Athens. The primary aim of Pandektis is to disseminate scholarly research in the emerging field of sports law. As of the time of reporting, seven volumes of the International Sports Law Review – Pandektis had been published.

The latest volume includes articles on contemporary issues in sports law, such as analyses of the FIFA Regulations on the Status and Transfer of Players, as well as studies on fundamental concepts, including the nature of the international sports legal order (lex sportiva) and its relationship with national legal systems. The volume also contains recent judgments of the European Court of Justice, orders and awards of the Court of Arbitration for Sport, and announcements from the IASL.
