= Duke Ihenacho =

American football player (born 1989)

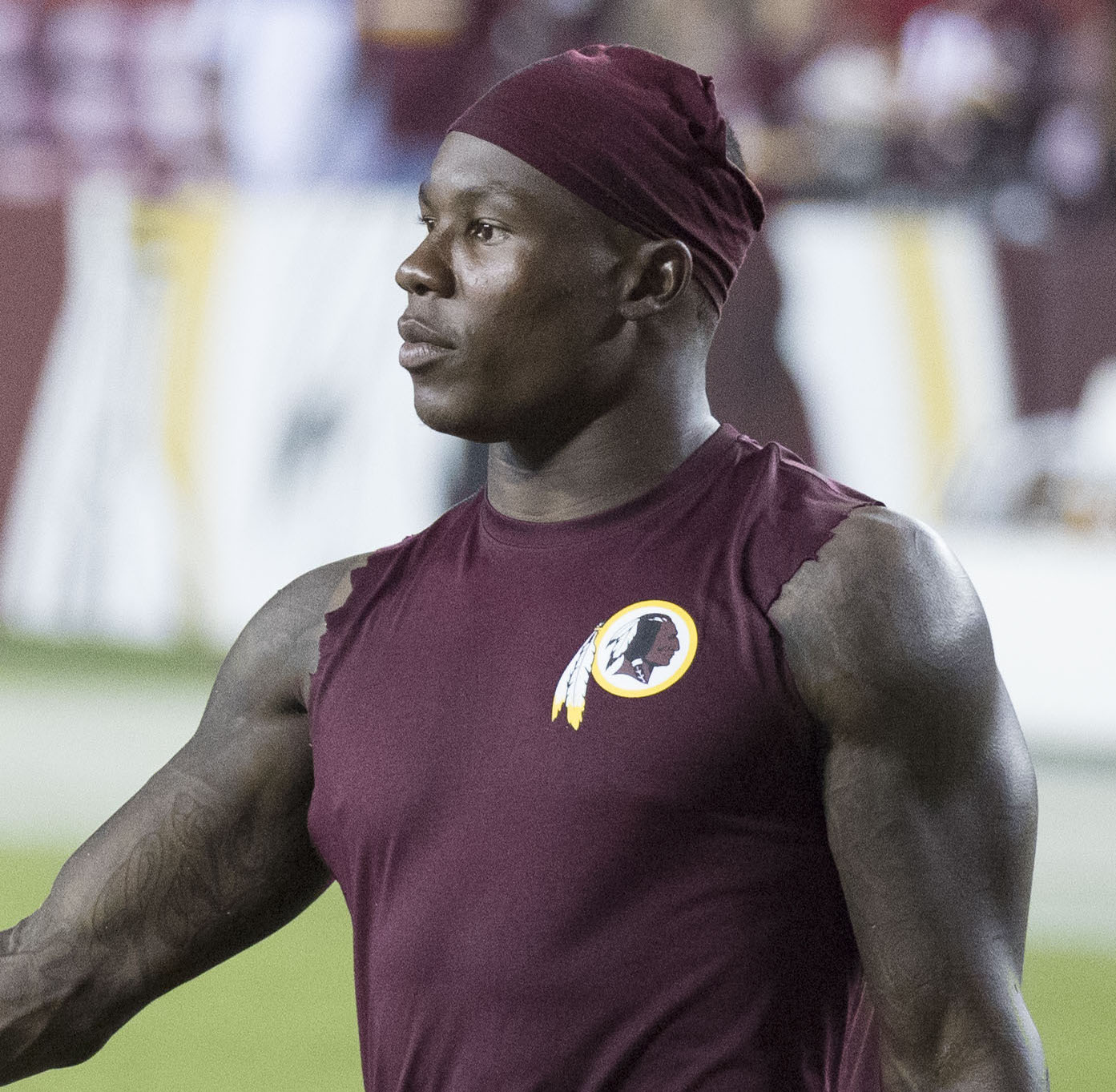
- Ihenacho with the Washington Redskins in 2016

No. 33, 35, 24, 29
- Position: Safety

Personal information
- Born: June 16, 1989 (age 37); Torrance, California, U.S.
- Listed height: 6 ft 0 in (1.83 m)
- Listed weight: 212 lb (96 kg)

Career information
- High school: Junípero Serra (Gardena, California)
- College: San Jose State
- NFL draft: 2012: undrafted

Career history
- Denver Broncos (2012–2013); Washington Redskins (2014–2016); New York Giants (2017)*
- * Offseason or practice squad member only

Awards and highlights
- 3× First-team All-WAC (2008, 2009, 2011)

Career NFL statistics
- Total tackles: 145
- Forced fumbles: 3
- Fumble recoveries: 2
- Pass deflections: 8
- Stats at Pro Football Reference

Duke Uba Ihenacho (born June 16, 1989) is an American former professional football player who was a safety in the National Football League (NFL). He played college football for the San Jose State Spartans. He signed with the Denver Broncos as an undrafted free agent following the 2012 NFL draft. He was also a member of the Washington Redskins and New York Giants.

== Early life ==
Born in Torrance, California, Ihenacho grew up in Carson, California and graduated from Junípero Serra High School at Gardena in 2007. He is of Nigerian descent. Although Ihenacho's mother did not allow him to play Pop Warner football, he joined the Serra High School football team in junior year after playing basketball and baseball most of his childhood. A three-star recruit, Ihenacho attracted two offers from New Mexico State and San Jose State. On February 27, 2007, Ihenacho signed with San Jose State.

College recruiting
| Name | Hometown | School | Height | Weight | 40^{‡} | Commit date |
|---|---|---|---|---|---|---|
| Duke Ihenacho; S | Carson, California | Junípero Serra HS | 6 ft 1 in (1.85 m) | 191 lb (87 kg) | 4.73 | Feb 7, 2007 |
| Duke Ihenacho; S | Recruit ratings: Scout: Rivals: 247Sports: (70) | | | | | |
Overall recruit ranking: Scout: 54 (S); 102 (school) Rivals: 104 (school) 247Sports: 74 (S), 124 (CA), 88 (school)
‡ Refers to 40-yard dash; Note: In many cases, Scout, Rivals, 247Sports, On3, and ESPN may conflict in their listings of height, weight and 40 time.; In these cases, the average was taken. ESPN grades are on a 100-point scale.; Sources: "San Jose St. Football Commitment List". Rivals.; "San Jose State College Football Team Recruiting Prospects". Scout.; "San Jose State Spartans 2007 player commits". ESPN.; "Scout.com Team Recruiting Rankings". Scout.; "2007 Team Ranking". Rivals.com.; "San Jose State 2007 Football Commits". 247Sports.

== College career ==
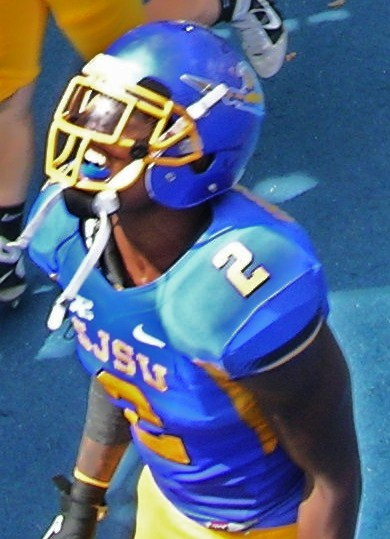
Ihenacho in September 2011 with San Jose State.

At San Jose State University, Ihenacho played five seasons with the Spartans football team under coaches Dick Tomey (2007 to 2009) and Mike MacIntyre (2010 to 2011). Ihenacho played on the team with his older brother Carl Ihenacho until 2009.

Ihenacho entered the Spartans in 2007 as the youngest player on the team and ended the year with 32 tackles, the most for a San Jose State freshman since 2004. On September 29, Ihenacho made the only blocked punt in a win against UC Davis. Following the blocked punt, quarterback Adam Tafralis made a 47-yard touchdown pass. Ihenacho made a season-high seven tackles on October 12 against Hawaii and forced a fumble in that game as well. San Jose State ended 2007 with a 5–7 record (4–4 in Western Athletic Conference games).

In 2008, ESPN ranked Carl and Duke Ihenacho as one of the top ten brother combinations in college football for being among the top defensive players in FBS football. By mid-October 2008, Duke led the FBS in interceptions. In both the October 11 game against Utah State and October 18 game against New Mexico State, Ihenacho scored a 43-yard touchdown off an interception. Ihenacho's two interceptions in the Utah State game marked the only such time in the 2008 season. Ihenacho played as a linebacker in 2008 and was a first-team All-Western Athletic Conference (WAC) selection. San Jose State finished 2008 one game up from 2007, 6-6 (but still 4–4 in WAC).

However, San Jose State finished the 2009 season 2-10 (1-7 WAC). In 2009, Ihenacho made 89 tackles, the second-most in the team that year, and tied his individual game high of 12 on October 10 against Idaho and November 21 against Hawaii. San Jose State football coach Dick Tomey retired after 2009, and Mike MacIntyre became the new head coach. In MacIntyre's first season, the Spartans finished 1-11 (0-8 WAC). Ihenacho played only in two games of 2010 before a season-ending injury.

2011 was a better season for the San Jose State Spartans, who finished 5-7 (3-4 WAC). Ihenacho made 73 tackles in 2011, the third-most in the team, and led the team in deflected passes with six. Ihenacho made his third career touchdown on October 1 with a 20-yard fumble return against Colorado State. That was also the first fumble returned for a touchdown by a San Jose State player since 2004. In four games, Ihenacho made 10 or more tackles, including a season high 11 each against Idaho and Utah State.

On October 14, 2011, San Jose State rallied in its homecoming game to beat Hawaii 28–27. ESPN carried that game as part of College Football Friday Primetime. With San Jose State down 27–20 in the fourth quarter, Ihenacho recovered a blocked point after touchdown and took the ball to the end zone for a defensive two-point conversion. San Jose State won despite five turnovers. Geico nominated Ihenacho's conversion as the company's Play of the Year. Ihenacho earned his third first-team All-WAC selection in 2011. In December 2011, Ihenacho graduated from San Jose State with a B.A. in communication studies.

== Professional career ==
=== Pre-draft ===
Ihenacho was considered one of the top strong safeties in the 2012 NFL draft. and was projected as a 5th-round pick.

Pre-draft measurables
| Height | Weight | Arm length | Hand span | 40-yard dash | 10-yard split | 20-yard split | 20-yard shuttle | Three-cone drill | Vertical jump | Broad jump | Bench press |
|---|---|---|---|---|---|---|---|---|---|---|---|
| 6 ft 0 in (1.83 m) | 213 lb (97 kg) | 32 3/4 in (0.83 m) | 9 1/4 in (0.23 m) | 4.68 s | 1.62 s | 2.65 s | 4.22 s | 6.78 s | 35 in (0.89 m) | 10 ft 2 in (3.10 m) | 20 reps |
All values from NFL Combine

=== Denver Broncos ===
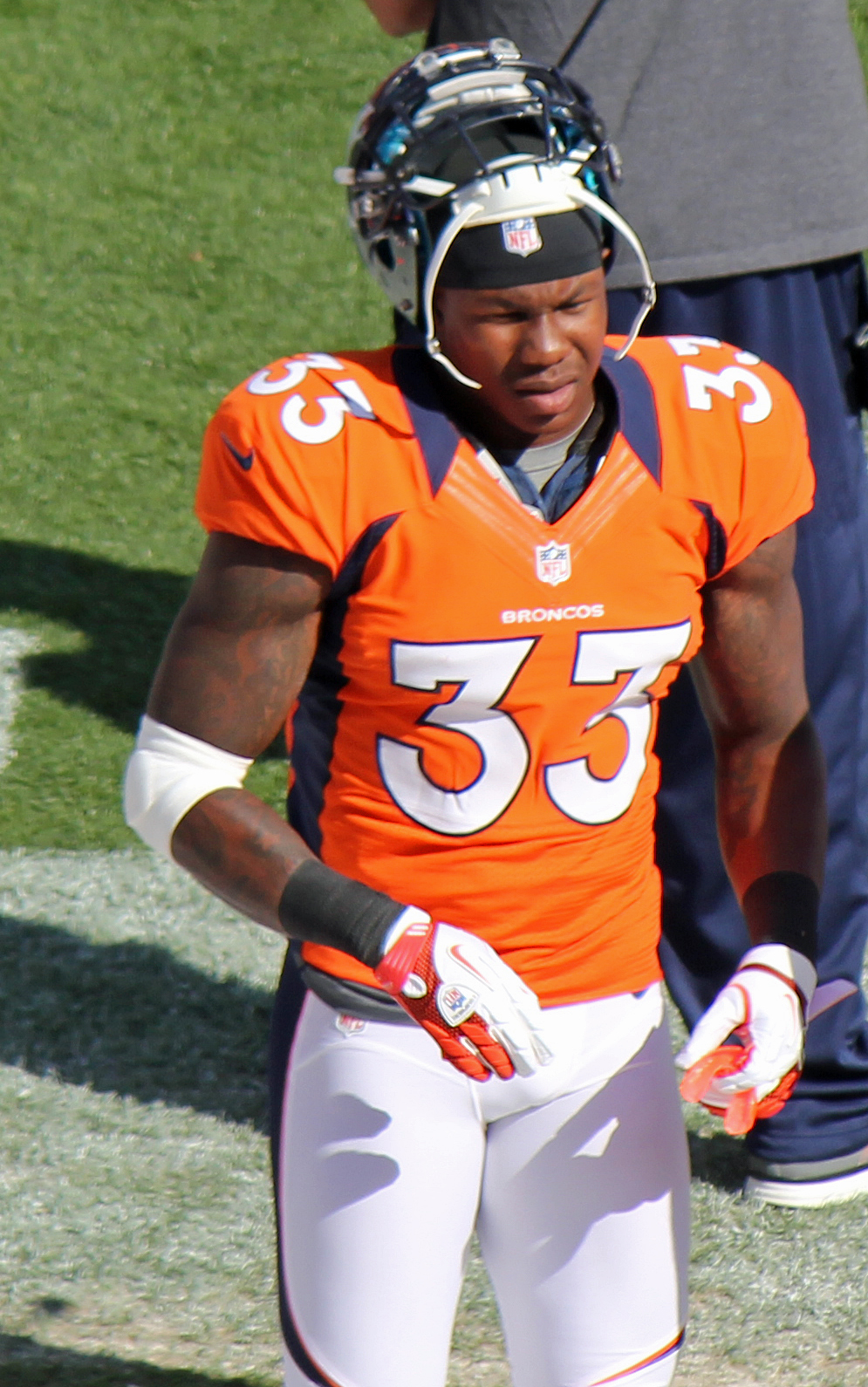
Ihenacho playing for the Denver Broncos in 2012.

Ihenacho signed with the Denver Broncos as an undrafted free agent following the 2012 NFL draft on April 28, 2012. Ihenacho played all four games of the 2012 preseason and made seven tackles during the preseason.

The Broncos signed Ihenacho to the practice squad on September 1 and activated Ihenacho from the practice squad on September 29, 2012. On October 11, 2012, the Broncos released Ihenacho. They later signed him back to the practice squad on October 13 and to the active roster again on November 1. Ihenacho made one assisted tackle in his second game of the season, November 4 (Week 9) in a win over the Cincinnati Bengals. On November 13, 2012, he was waived by the Broncos. Three days later, the Broncos re-signed Ihenacho to the practice squad.

In the 2013 offseason, Ihenacho began turning heads, showing very good cover skills and run stopping abilities. In the first released depth chart, Ihenacho climbed all the way to the number two spot for strong safety, pushing Mike Adams for the starting job. In the Broncos' first 2013 preseason game against the San Francisco 49ers, Ihenacho was in with the starters and led the team with 7 tackles, one being for a loss, and also had a forced fumble, which Rahim Moore recovered.

On September 5, 2013, Ihenacho started his first NFL game at strong safety against the Baltimore Ravens. He recorded 11 solo tackles and had one assisted tackle in Denver's 49–27 win.

On September 15, in the Broncos' 41–23 win over the New York Giants, Ihenacho hurt his ankle in the fourth quarter and was carted off the field.

On October 6, in a game against the Dallas Cowboys, Ihenacho recovered a fumble by Dez Bryant, forced by rookie teammate, Kayvon Webster in the 51–48 win.

Ihenacho started Super Bowl XLVIII for the Broncos and had 9 tackles in the Broncos' 43–8 loss to the Seattle Seahawks.

Ihenacho was waived by the Broncos on August 30, 2014, before the start of the 2014 season.

=== Washington Redskins ===
The Washington Redskins claimed Ihenacho off waivers on August 31, 2014. He suffered a fracture in his left foot in Week 3 against the Philadelphia Eagles. He was placed on injured reserve the next day.

The Redskins re-signed Ihenacho to a one-year contract on March 4, 2015. By the end of training camp, he beat out Jeron Johnson for the starting strong safety position. He was placed on injured reserve on September 15, 2015, after dislocating and fracturing his left wrist in the first game of the 2015 season.

On March 9, 2016, Ihenacho re-signed with the Redskins on another one-year contract. He wasn't resigned after the 2016 season and became a free agent.

=== New York Giants ===
On May 25, 2017, Ihenacho signed with the New York Giants. He was placed on injured reserve on September 1, 2017, with a knee injury. He was released on September 5, 2017.

== NFL career statistics ==
Legend
| **Bold** | Career high |

=== Regular season ===
| Year | Team | Games | | Tackles | | | | | Interceptions | | | | | Fumbles | | | |
| Year | Team | GP | GS | Cmb | Solo | Ast | Sck | TFL | Int | Yds | TD | Lng | PD | FF | FR | Yds | TD |
|---|---|---|---|---|---|---|---|---|---|---|---|---|---|---|---|---|---|
| 2012 | DEN | 2 | 0 | 1 | 0 | 1 | 0.0 | 0 | 0 | 0 | 0 | 0 | 0 | 0 | 0 | 0 | 0 |
| 2013 | DEN | **15** | **14** | **74** | **57** | **17** | 0.0 | 2 | 0 | 0 | 0 | 0 | **6** | **3** | **2** | 0 | 0 |
| 2014 | WAS | 3 | 0 | 1 | 0 | 1 | 0.0 | 0 | 0 | 0 | 0 | 0 | 0 | 0 | 0 | 0 | 0 |
| 2015 | WAS | 1 | 1 | 3 | 1 | 2 | 0.0 | 0 | 0 | 0 | 0 | 0 | 0 | 0 | 0 | 0 | 0 |
| 2016 | WAS | **15** | 10 | 66 | 54 | 12 | 0.0 | **4** | 0 | 0 | 0 | 0 | 2 | 0 | 0 | 0 | 0 |
| | | 36 | 25 | 145 | 112 | 33 | 0.0 | 6 | 0 | 0 | 0 | 0 | 8 | 3 | 2 | 0 | 0 |

=== Playoffs ===
| Year | Team | Games | | Tackles | | | | | Interceptions | | | | | Fumbles | | | |
| Year | Team | GP | GS | Cmb | Solo | Ast | Sck | TFL | Int | Yds | TD | Lng | PD | FF | FR | Yds | TD |
|---|---|---|---|---|---|---|---|---|---|---|---|---|---|---|---|---|---|
| 2013 | DEN | **3** | **3** | **15** | **10** | **5** | 0.0 | 0 | 0 | 0 | 0 | 0 | 0 | 0 | 0 | 0 | 0 |
| | | 3 | 3 | 15 | 10 | 5 | 0.0 | 0 | 0 | 0 | 0 | 0 | 0 | 0 | 0 | 0 | 0 |
