= Professional sports =

Sports in which participants receive payment for their performance

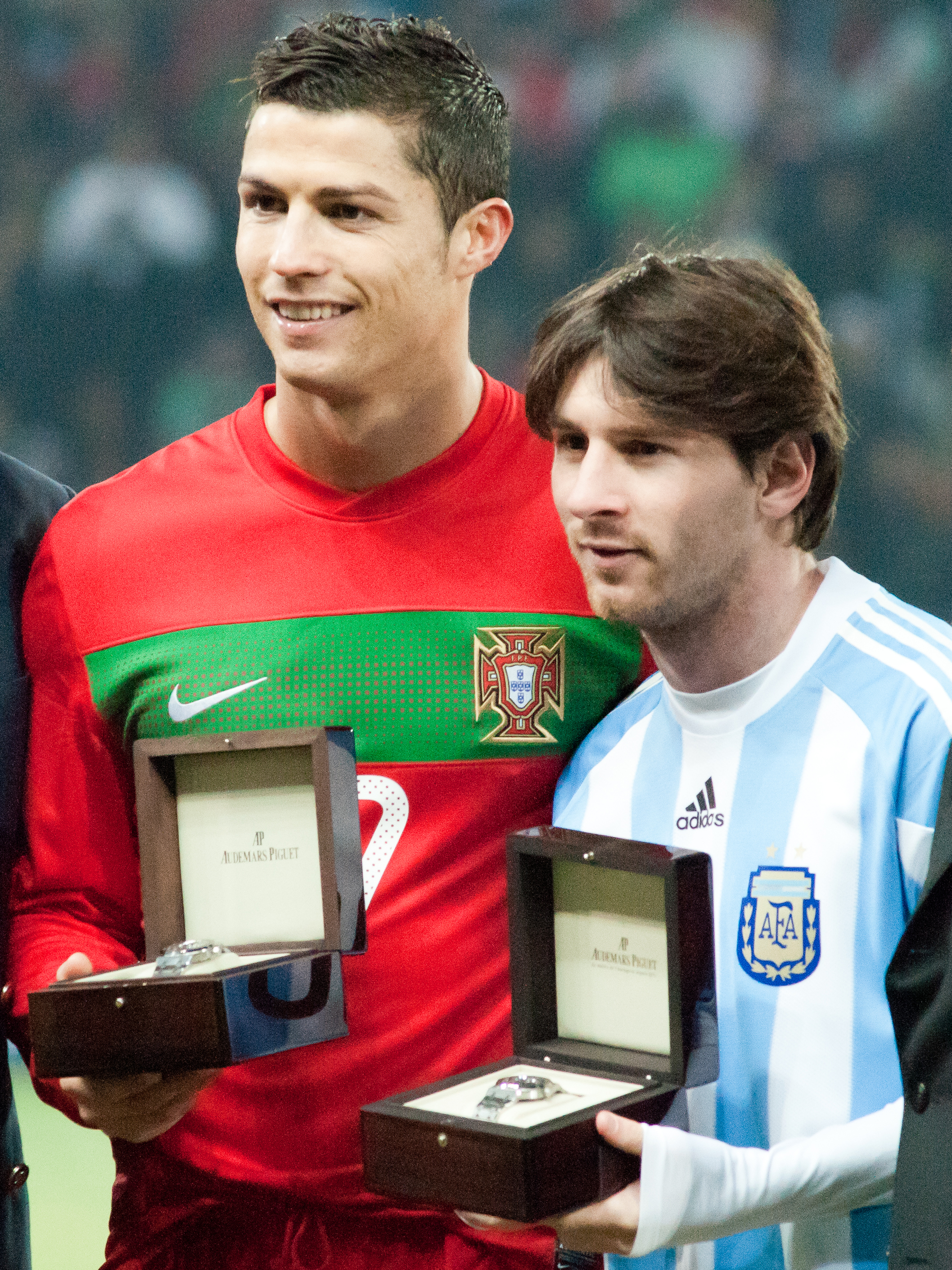
Professional athletes like footballers Cristiano Ronaldo and Lionel Messi receive salaries that come from corporate sponsors that advertise on their uniforms or around the sporting venue, as well as from the fans who pay money to attend the game

In professional sports, as opposed to amateur sports, participants receive payment for their performance. Professionalism in sport has come to the fore through a combination of developments. Mass media and increased leisure have brought larger audiences, enabling sports organizations and teams to command large incomes. As a result, more sportspeople can afford to make sport their primary career, devoting the training time necessary to increase skills, physical condition, and experience to modern levels of achievement. This proficiency has also helped boost the popularity of sports. In most sports played professionally, there are many more amateurs than professional players, though amateurs and professionals do not usually compete.

== History ==
=== American football ===
American football (commonly known as football in the United States) was professionalized in the 1890s as a slow, and initially covert, process; Pudge Heffelfinger and Ben "Sport" Donnelly were the first to secretly accept payment for playing the game in 1892. Regional leagues in Chicago, Pennsylvania, Ohio and New York had coalesced in the 1900s and 1910s, most of which gave way to the American Professional Football Association in 1920. By 1920, pro football remained overshadowed by the college game. The first game involving an APFA team took place on 26 September 1920, at Douglas Park in Rock Island, Illinois, as the hometown Independents flattened the St. Paul Ideals 48–0. The first head-to-head battles in the league occurred one week later as Dayton topped Columbus 14–0 and Rock Island pasted Muncie 45–0.

Forward passes were rare, coaching from the sidelines was prohibited and players competed on both offense and defense. Money was so tight that George Halas carried equipment, wrote press releases, sold tickets, taped ankles, played and coached for the Decatur club. As opposed to today's standard 17-game schedule, clubs in 1920 scheduled their own opponents and could play non-league and even college squads that counted toward their records. With no established guidelines, the number of games played—and the quality of opponents scheduled—by APFA teams varied, and the league did not maintain official standings.

The inaugural season was a struggle. Games received little attention from the fans, and even less from the press. According to Robert W. Peterson's book "Pigskin: The Early Years of Pro Football," APFA games averaged crowds of 4,241. The association bylaws called for teams to pay a US$100 entry fee, but no one ever did. The season concluded on 19 December. At the conclusion of the season there were no play-offs (that innovation, although New York's regional league had used it, did not arrive until 1933) and it took more than four months before the league even bothered to crown a champion. Much as college football did for decades, the APFA determined its victor by ballot. On 30 April 1921, team representatives voted the Akron Pros, which completed the season undefeated with eight wins and three ties while yielding only a total of seven points, the champion in spite of protests by the one-loss teams in Decatur and Buffalo, who each had tied Akron and had more wins, thanks in part to Akron's owner presiding over the meeting. The victors received a silver loving cup donated by sporting goods company Brunswick-Balke-Collender. While players were not given diamond-encrusted rings, they did receive golden fobs in the shape of a football inscribed with the words "World Champions." The whereabouts of the Brunswick-Balke Collender Cup, only given out that one time, are unknown.

The legacy of two APFA franchises continues. The Racine Cardinals now play in Arizona, and the Decatur Staleys moved to Chicago in 1921 and changed their name to the Bears the following year. Ten APFA players along with Carr are enshrined in the Pro Football Hall of Fame, set up in 1963 not far from the Canton automobile dealership that gave birth to the NFL in 1920.

The APFA, by 1922 known as the National Football League, has remained the predominant professional American football league in the United States, and, effectively, the entire world. The evolution from a haphazard collection of teams in big and small cities to the much more rigid structure it is in the present was gradual. With most of the small-market teams except the Green Bay Packers squeezed out of the NFL by the time of the Great Depression, multiple attempts at teams in the major cities of Washington, New York, Detroit, Cleveland, and Philadelphia failed before, eventually, their current representatives took root (though Boston proved particularly problematic until the New England Patriots were accepted into the NFL in 1970); the NFL expanded coast-to-coast, the first of the four major leagues to do so, in 1946 with the Los Angeles Rams and admitted the San Francisco 49ers four years later; the NFL did not enter the Southern United States until admitting the Dallas Cowboys, Atlanta Falcons and New Orleans Saints in the 1960s. A championship game was established in 1933, a draft was established in 1936, and schedules were standardized in the 1930s. A competing league has historically arisen to attempt to challenge the NFL's dominance every 10 to 15 years, but none managed to maintain long-term operations independent of the NFL and only two—the All-America Football Conference of the late 1940s and the American Football League of the 1960s—were strong enough to successfully compete against the league before the NFL subsumed their operations. Minor league football, although their leagues' memberships were unstable, began to arise in the late 1930s and remained viable as a business model up into the 1970s.

A major factor in the NFL's rise to dominance was its embrace of television early in the sport's history. As college football heavily restricted the rights of its teams to broadcast games (a policy eventually ruled to be illegal in 1984), the NFL instead allowed games to be televised nationwide, except in a team's home city; the restriction was softened in the early 1970s, by which point the NFL had secured broadcast deals with all of the major television networks, another major factor in the inability of any competing league to gain traction since then.

The related sport of Canadian football was eventually professionalized by the 1950s with the evolution of the Canadian Football League. The CFL, despite losing all games in a series of contests against the NFL, was considered to be at least comparable in talent to the American leagues of the 1960s (its lone game against an AFL squad was a victory). Because Canada has a tenth of the population of the United States, the ability to make money from television was much lower, and although some of the cities of Canada were comparable to the major markets of the U.S., teams in places such as Saskatchewan and Hamilton were in markets quite small compared to even the small markets of the NFL, thus the CFL pays significantly less than other major professional leagues, though enough to be considered fully professional.

Europe, Japan, Mexico also have American football leagues of varying levels that sign professional players. The top leagues are the German Football League, Austrian Football League, the new European League of Football and the X-League. There are over 60 countries that have leagues throughout the world.

The rise of indoor American football from the late 1980s allowed smaller-scale professional football to be viable.

=== Baseball ===
Baseball originated before the American Civil War (1861–1865). First played on sandlots in particular, scoring and record-keeping gave baseball gravity. "Today," notes John Thorn in The Baseball Encyclopedia, "baseball without records is inconceivable."

In 1871, the first professional baseball league was created. By the beginning of the 20th century, most large cities in the eastern United States had a professional baseball team. After several leagues came and went in the 19th century, the National League (founded in 1876) and American League (recognized as a major league in 1903) were established as the dominant leagues by the early 20th century. The most victorious team in each league was said to have won the "pennant;" the two pennant winners met after the end of the regular season in the World Series. The winner of at least four games (out of a possible seven) was the champion for that year. This arrangement still holds today, although the leagues are now subdivided and pennants are decided in post-season playoff series between the winners of each division.

Baseball became popular in the 1920s, when Babe Ruth led the New York Yankees to several World Series titles and became a national hero on the strength of his home runs (balls that cannot be played because they have been hit out of the field). One of the most noteworthy players was the Brooklyn Dodgers' Jackie Robinson, who became the first African-American player in the major leagues in 1947; until then black players had been restricted to the Negro leagues.

Starting in the late 1950s, major league baseball expanded its geographical range. Western cities acquired teams, either by luring them to move from eastern cities or by forming expansion teams with players made available by established teams. Until the 1970s, because of strict contracts, the owners of baseball teams also virtually owned the players; the rules then changed so that players could become free agents within certain limits, free to sell their services to any team. The resulting bidding wars led to players becoming increasingly wealthy. Disputes between the players' union and the owners have at times halted baseball for months at a time (e.g., 1994–95 player strike).

A prominent professional baseball circuit known as Nippon Professional Baseball (NPB) also developed in Japan. Founded in 1934, the league emerged as an international force after World War II. NPB is considered to be the highest caliber of baseball outside the U.S. major leagues, and the best Japanese players often emigrate to the U.S. by way of the posting system. Other countries where the game is important include South Korea (where their league has its own posting system with Major League Baseball), Taiwan, Mexico, Latin America, and the Caribbean states.

=== Basketball ===
Basketball was invented in 1891 and the first professional leagues emerged in the 1920s. The Basketball Association of America was established in 1946 and three years later became the modern National Basketball Association. The NBA was slower to establish dominance of the sport than other sports in the United States, as it would not do so until 1976, when it absorbed four teams from the American Basketball Association.

Professional basketball has the advantages of much smaller rosters than other professional sports, allowing the sport to be viable in smaller cities than other sports. Professional basketball leagues of varying caliber can be found around the world, especially in Europe and South America.

Basketball mainly became popular in the early 1980s when Magic Johnson and Larry Bird joined the NBA and lead their teams to multiple NBA titles. They are considered two of the best players of all time usually underneath Michael Jordan. Michael Jordan also gained the NBA views with carrying the Chicago Bulls to six titles in the 1990s.

=== Cricket ===
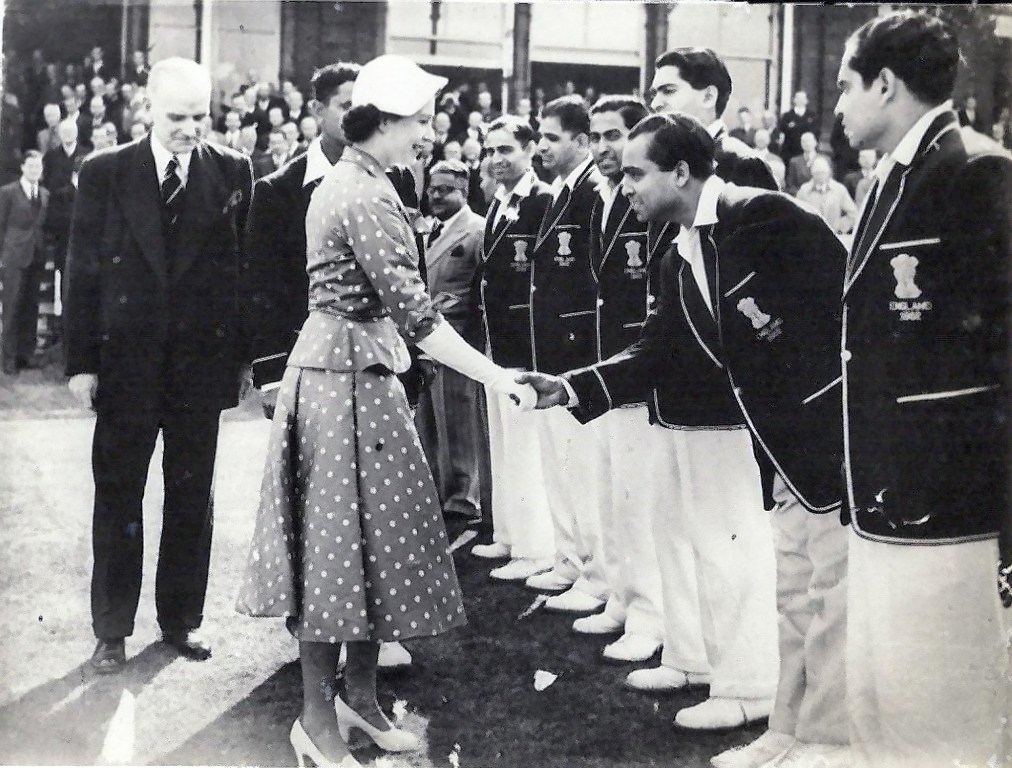
Queen Elizabeth II with members of the Indian team during the Indian tour of England in 1952.

In the 1920s some cricketers from the Caribbean played professional cricket in Britain. After World War II, professional cricketers from the Indian subcontinent were enlisted in British teams.

=== Ice hockey ===
Ice hockey was first professionalized in Pittsburgh, U.S. in the first decade of the 20th century. Because Canadians made up the vast majority of hockey players, early American professional leagues imported almost all of their players before Canadian leagues began to form in the wake of a mining boom, depriving the U.S. leagues and teams of talented players. Two distinct circuits formed: the Pacific Coast Hockey Association in western Canada and the northwestern U.S., and the National Hockey Association of central Canada, both of which competed for the then-independent Stanley Cup. The NHA's teams reorganized as the National Hockey League in 1917, and the West Coast circuit died out by the mid-1920s.

By 1926, the NHL had expanded to ten teams in Canada and the northeastern and midwestern United States. However, the onset of the Great Depression in the 1930s and Canada's entry into World War II, greatly reducing the league's player pool, led to the league's retrenchment to six markets: Boston, New York City, Chicago and Detroit in the U.S., and Toronto and Montreal in Canada. These Original Six cities were the only cities with NHL franchises from 1935 to 1967. During this time, the NHL was both stagnant and restrictive in its policies, giving teams territorial advantages, having teams with multiple owners in the same family (thus allowing the best players to be stacked onto certain teams), and restricting its players' salaries through reserve clauses. This stagnation allowed other leagues to arise: the Western Hockey League soon became the de facto major league of the western states and provinces, and the second-tier American Hockey League emerged in a number of midwestern markets the NHL had neglected, in addition to a handful of small towns.

Amid pressure from television networks that were threatening to offer the WHL a contract, the NHL doubled in size in 1967, beginning a period of expansion that lasted through much of the 1970s. The last major challenger to the NHL's dominance was the World Hockey Association, which successfully broke the NHL's reserve clause in court, drove up professional hockey salaries, and continued to pressure the older league into expansion. The WHA merged four of its remaining teams into the NHL in 1979, but had to give up most of its players, as they were still under NHL contract and had to return to their original teams. The NHL made its last pronounced realignment in the 1990s, moving most of the WHA teams out of their markets and establishing a number of new teams in the southern United States.

In Europe, the introduction of professionalism varied widely, and the highest-caliber league on the continent, the Soviet Championship League (proven to be at least equal to or better than the NHL in the 1970s), was officially populated with ostensibly amateur players who were actually full-time sportspeople hired as regular workers of a company (aircraft industry, food workers, tractor industry) or organization (KGB, Red Army, Soviet Air Force) that sponsored what would be presented as an after-hours social sports society hockey team for their workers. In other words, all Soviet hockey players were de facto professionals who circumvented the amateur rules of the International Olympic Committee to retain their amateur status and compete in the Olympics. The modern-day descendant of the Soviet league, the Kontinental Hockey League, is fully professional and has some teams outside Russia, to the point where it has the resources to sign NHL veterans. Other European countries including Germany, Sweden, Switzerland, Norway, Finland, and Austria have prominent professional leagues.

=== Rugby league ===
Rugby league began playing professionally in 1895 after splitting from rugby union. The two main professional leagues National Rugby League and Super League are based in Australia (including one New Zealand based team) and England respectively (including two French based teams).

=== Rugby union ===
Rugby union was strictly an amateur sport throughout the 19th and most of the 20th century. In 1995, the game's international administrators allowed professionals to participate for the first time. Professional Rugby union is played in many countries throughout the world including but not limited to Australia, France, Japan, New Zealand, South Africa, the United Kingdom (and Ireland) and United States.

== Opposition to professionalism ==
Professional athleticism has been a traditional object of criticism by proponents of the amateur philosophy of sport, according to which the central ethos of sport is competition performed for its own sake and pure enjoyment rather than as a means of earning a living. Examples of amateur philosophy include the muscular Christianity movement that informed the promotion of sports in the English public school system, and the Olympism advocated by Pierre de Coubertin, a force behind the revival of the modern Olympic Games. The tension between the two sporting practices and ideals dates from the inception of modern organized sports in the 19th century. The high political and financial stakes involved in sport have ensured that this tension has remained strong. Professional sporting organizations have often developed as "rebel" organizations in relation to established national and international federation, for example the schism which created the code of rugby league.

Arguments against amateurism often appeal to the argument that amateurism in sport favors the classes who can afford not to be paid to play, and is thus a covert form of prejudice against lower classes. Another argument is that amateur players are often de facto professionals who retain their amateur status by earning allowances instead of salaries. For example, all Eastern bloc countries were populated with amateur players who were actually full-time athletes hired as regular workers of a company (aircraft industry, food workers, tractor industry) or organization (KGB, Red Army, Soviet Air Force) that sponsored what would be presented as an after-hours social sports society team for their workers.

=== Religious opposition ===
Christians in the Wesleyan-Holiness movement, which adheres to the position of first-day Sabbatarianism, oppose the viewing of or participation in professional sports, believing that professional sports leagues profane the Sabbath, compete with a Christian's primary commitment to God, exhibit a lack of modesty in the players' and cheerleaders' uniforms, are associated with violence and extensive use of profanity among many players, and encourage gambling, as well as alcohol and other drugs at sporting events, which go against a commitment to teetotalism.

Laestadian Lutherans, who belong to the Pietistic Lutheran tradition, likewise teach that "Competitive sports are not acceptable, but we should maintain fitness through various forms of exercise."

== Sports salaries ==
Professional sportsmen can earn a great deal of money at the highest levels; for instance, in 2024 the Los Angeles Dodgers baseball team is set to pay 70 million dollars to its highest-paid player, Shohei Ohtani. Per Forbes 2021 ranking, the highest-paid athletes include Cristiano Ronaldo, Lionel Messi, Naomi Osaka, Tiger Woods, Serena Williams and wrestler-turned-actor The Rock. The top ten tennis players make about $3 million a year on average. Much of the growth in income for sports and athletes has come from broadcasting rights; for example, the most recent television contract for the NFL is valued at nearly US$5 billion per year.

Women tend to earn considerably less than men in such sports as basketball, golf, football (soccer), softball and baseball. The exception is tennis where women tend to have salaries comparable to those of their male counterparts. The highest-paid female athlete in 2019 was Serena Williams with a $29.2 million annual income; the highest-paid male player was Lionel Messi with a $127 million annual income. In association football, the average wage for women worldwide is $35,000, while for men it is $410,730. Attendances in women's leagues also tend to be lower than in men's, and there are fewer corporate sponsors, as well as less money from broadcasting rights. Widespread gender discrepancies hamper the support and appreciation of female athletes in professional sports. Female athletes struggle to obtain the same degree of visibility and sponsorship opportunities as male athletes, whose accomplishments frequently dominate mainstream sports coverage. According to Cheryl Cooky's TEDx talk, a professor in American studies, gender, and sexuality at Purdue University, the marginalization of female athletes in mainstream sports media and sponsorship opportunities is nothing new. According to Cooky, female athletes need more visibility to ensure their access to necessary resources and financial security, which has an impact on their professional development.

Outside the highest leagues, however, the money professional athletes can earn drops dramatically, as fan bases are generally smaller and there are no television revenues. For instance, while the National Football League's teams can afford to pay their players millions of dollars each year and still maintain a significant profit, the second-highest American football league in the United States, the United Football League, consistently struggled to pay its bills and has continually lost money despite allotting its players only US$20,000 a year, and television networks made the league pay for television airtime instead of paying the league, making the league's business model unworkable. In the United States and Canada, most lower-end professional leagues run themselves as affiliated farm teams, effectively agreeing to develop younger players for eventual play in the major leagues in exchange for subsidizing those players' salaries; this is known as the minor league system and is most prevalent in professional baseball and professional ice hockey. Otherwise, the league may be required to classify itself as semi-professional, in other words, able to pay their players a small sum, but not enough to cover the player's basic costs of living.

Many professional athletes experience financial difficulties soon after retiring, due to a combination of bad investments, careless spending, and a lack of non-athletic skills. The wear and tear of a career in professional sport, can cause physical and mental side effects (such as chronic traumatic encephalopathy, a condition that has seen a massive rise in public awareness in the 2010s) that can harm a former professional athlete's employability. In the United States, some of these problems are mitigated by the fact that the college sports system ensures most professional athletes receive a college education with no student debt, a legacy that provides them with a career path after their sports career ends.

=== American football ===
In the NFL average annual salaries by position in 2009 were:

- Quarterback $1,970,982 (this is a mean that covers both starting quarterbacks and backups; starters regularly draw salaries of over $30,000,000 as of 2024)
- Running back $957,360
- Defensive tackle $1,223,925

=== Association football ===
==== Russian Premier League ====
The highest-paid player for the 2011–2012 Russian Premier League season was Samuel Eto'o of Anzhi Makhachkala, who at the end of the 2011–12 season was expected to receive a total salary of RUB 900.2 million (£35.7 million) after income tax, making Eto'o the second highest-earning athlete in the world and the highest-paid footballer in the world followed by Lionel Messi and Zlatan Ibrahimović.

==== Bundesliga ====
The average salary of a player in the German Bundesliga was about €3.3 million (£2.5 million) for the 2010–11 season, up from €2.5 million in the 2009–2010 Bundesliga season. The highest-paid player for the 2010–11 Bundesliga season was Franck Ribéry of Bayern Munich who received a salary of €6.3 million after income tax.

==== Serie A ====
In the Italian top league, Serie A, the average salary was about €5 million for the 2010–2011 Serie A season, up from €1 million in the 2005–2006 Serie A season. The highest-paid player for the 2010–2011 Serie A season was Zlatan Ibrahimović of A.C. Milan who received a salary of €25.9 million after income tax and which also includes Ibrahimović's bonuses and endorsements.

==== La Liga ====
Lionel Messi of FC Barcelona is the world's second highest-paid player receiving a salary of £29.6 million (over US$45 million) a year after income taxation and which also includes the incomes of Messi's bonuses and endorsements. In the Spanish La Liga, the average salary for the players of Lionel Messi's club FC Barcelona was €6.5 million for the 2010–2011 La Liga season, up from €5.5 million for the 2009–2010 La Liga season.

==== Premier League ====
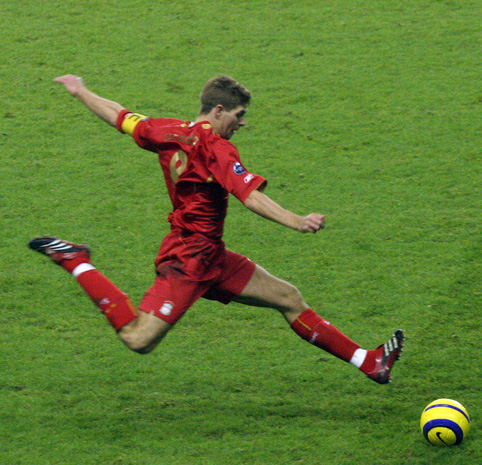
Liverpool Footballer Steven Gerrard preparing to strike the ball, 2005

The average salary of a player in the English Premier League was about £2.6 million in the 2017–18 season, compared with about £1.2 million in 2007–08 and £676,000 in 2006–07. Even as early as 2010–11, top players such as John Terry and Steven Gerrard could make up to £7 million per year with the players of Premier League club Manchester City F.C. receiving an average salary of £2 million in that season. Premier League salaries have boomed in more recent years thanks to massive television deals and wealthy new investors in clubs. Terry's and Gerrard's 2010–11 salaries would not have placed them among the top 25 earners in 2017–18. In that season, more than 20 players earned more than £10 million, led by Alexis Sánchez (£21.5 million) and Mesut Özil (£20.9 million). The Premier League's two Manchester clubs had the highest average salaries in 2017–18, with players for both Manchester United and Manchester City averaging over £5.2 million.

Players in lower divisions make significantly less money. In 2006–07 the average salary of a player in the Championship (the second tier of the English football pyramid) made £195,750 while the average salary for League One and League Two (tiers 3 and 4) combined were £49,600.

==== Major League Soccer ====
The highest salary in Major League Soccer in 2019 was the $14 million paid to former Swedish international Zlatan Ibrahimović, who played for the LA Galaxy in that season. Ibrahimović was signed to his 2019 contract under MLS' Designated Player Rule, which was instituted in 2007 for the express purpose of attracting international stars. Now-retired English star David Beckham was the first player signed under its provisions. When the rule was instituted, each team had one "Designated Player" slot with a salary cap charge of $400,000, but no limit on actual salary paid. Since then, the number of Designated Players per team has increased to three, with each counting for $530,000 of cap room in 2019. The league's average salary was about $283,000 per year in 2015, but the median salary was then closer to $110,000. MLS' minimum player salary in 2019 is $70,250 for most players, and for players on the reserve roster (slots #25-28) the minimum salary is $56,250.

=== Baseball ===
In 1970, the average salary in Major League Baseball in the U.S. and Canada was $20,000 ($165,810 inflation-adjusted). By 2005, the average salary had increased to $2,632,655 ($4,339,911 inflation-adjusted) and the minimum salary was $316,000 (adjusted: $520,923). In 2012 the average MLB salary was $3,440,000, the median salary was $1,075,000, and the minimum salary had grown to four times the inflation-adjusted average salary in 1970 ($480,000).

=== Cricket ===
In the Indian Premier League in 2019, players earn an average of $101,444, and a median salary of $72,450, per week. The top-paid players in international cricket in 2017 across the (at the time) 10 Test cricket nations earned anywhere from $90,000 to $1,470,000 (when looking only at contract and match fees).

== See also ==
- Semi-professional sports
- Amateur sports
- High performance sport
- Pro–am
- Professional sports leagues in the United States
- Salary cap
- Team sport
- Women's professional sports
- Professional sports league organization

=== Lists of professional sports ===
- List of American and Canadian cities by number of major professional sports franchises
- List of professional sports
- List of professional sports leagues
- List of largest sports contracts
