= List of professional sports =

This is a list of professional sports – that is, sports (and, more broadly, non-sport games subject to organized competition) that support one or more systems of professional sports players, sportspeople by occupation. Such sports also have a vibrant community of amateur players, from whom the best rise to become professionals.

== American and Canadian football ==
Rugby football in Canada had its origins in the early 1860s, and over time, a unique code of football known as Canadian football developed. Both the Canadian Football League (CFL), the sport's top professional league, and Football Canada, the governing body for amateur play, trace their roots to 1882 and the founding of the Canadian Rugby Football Union (later reorganized as the Canadian Rugby Union). In 1909, the Grey Cup was donated by the then Governor General of Canada Albert Grey, 4th Earl Grey, to recognize the top amateur rugby football team in Canada. From the 1930s to the 1950s, the two senior leagues of the CRU (the Interprovincial Rugby Football Union and the Western Interprovincial Football Union) gradually evolved from amateur to professional leagues, and found they had less and less in common with the amateur leagues, and consequently in 1956 formed a new umbrella organization, the Canadian Football Council. In 1958, the CFC left the CRU altogether and was renamed the Canadian Football League. By this time, teams from the amateur Ontario Rugby Football Union had stopped challenging for the Grey Cup, and ever since, it has been exclusively awarded to CFL teams. Since 1965, university teams have competed for the Vanier Cup.

== Australian rules football ==
Unlike other sports, Australian rules football has not resisted becoming a professional sport.

Although the sport began as amateur competition, the Australian Football League is an elite professional league and has been for nearly 80 years since its initial formation as the Victorian Football Association and then the Victorian Football League in 1897. The league changed its name to the Australian Football League (AFL) in 1990 amid the increasing professionalism and national expansion of the game.

== Bandy ==
Bandy is played professionally in Russia, Sweden, and Kazakhstan.

== Basketball ==
The game was invented in the United States in the 1890s, in Springfield, Massachusetts. The first professional basketball leagues emerged in the 1920s in the United States. Prominent among these were the American Basketball League, which formed in 1925, and the National Basketball League, which was launched in 1937 by General Electric, Firestone and Goodyear as a way to improve their national profile. In 1946 the Basketball Association of America was founded by the owners of major sports arenas, particularly the Madison Square Garden. The BAA later merged with the NBL in 1949 to become the National Basketball Association, the preeminent league in the world with 29 teams in the United States and one in Canada. The American Basketball Association, founded in 1967, subsequently joined the NBA in the 1976 ABA-NBA merger.

The second-oldest professional basketball league in the world is the Philippine Basketball Association. The PBA was long considered to be the best league in Asia, but the Chinese Basketball Association has grown tremendously in recent years. The league was born on April 9, 1975, at the Araneta Coliseum, Cubao, Quezon City, Philippines.

Outside of the NBA, the top professional leagues in the world are those of FIBA Europe. According to the official league rankings produced by Euroleague Basketball, the body that conducts the continent-wide Euroleague, the top five national domestic leagues on the continent (from 1 to 5) are those Liga ACB (Spain), the Russian Professional Basketball League, the Greek Basket League, Lega Basket Serie A (Italy), and the Turkish Basketball League.

European basketball is also characterized by its long established and well-developed transnational club competitions, most notably the Euroleague, which features top clubs from as many as 18 different domestic leagues. Two other continental club competitions, the ULEB Eurocup and EuroChallenge, are also conducted annually. Europe also has transnational regional leagues, such as the Liga ABA (Adriatic League, formerly Yugoslavian League), and Baltic Basketball League (originally limited to the Baltic states, now also including Kazakhstan).

== Bowling ==
Notable figures in professional bowling would include Walter Ray Williams, Jr., Chris Barnes and Rafael "Paeng" Nepomuceno.

== Cricket ==
Cricket at the highest level has developed into a fully professional international sport from which leading players can earn a large income. However professionalism has a long history in English cricket. The first professionals had appeared by the first half of the eighteenth century, when heavy gambling on the game encouraged wealthy patrons to draft the best players into their teams. They would often offer these players full-time employment as gardeners or gamekeepers on their estates. In the second half of the century, the famous Hambledon Club paid its players match fees.

In the middle of the nineteenth century William Clarke's All-England Eleven was a highly successful all-professional venture which did much to popularise the game. The earliest overseas tours were also all-professional affairs.

In the early 21st century cricket is as lucrative as some other sports, and domestic cricketers typically earn several times the average salary in their country. Regular members of the English cricket team earn several hundred thousand pounds a year. However, the highest paid cricketers in the world are the star members of the Australian cricket team or the Indian cricket team who make most of their income from endorsement contracts. Players in T20 leagues such as the Indian Premier League make significant sums of money without having to play international cricket.

== Cue sports ==
- Three-cushion billiards
- English billiards
- Pool
- Snooker

== Darts ==
Professional darts players perform in the Professional Darts Corporation or the World Darts Federation.

== Disc Golf ==
Professional Disc Golfers compete in Professional Disc Golf Association (PDGA) sanctioned events. Disc golf is among the fastest growing sports in the world. Its rules are similar to ball golf, with the throwing of discs replacing the hitting of balls and a specialty chain link network suspended above a basket replacing the cup.

== eSports ==
Pro gamers compete in many leagues and tournaments throughout the world. Many favorite games for esports include League of Legends, Overwatch, and Fortnite.

== Ice hockey ==
It is played with two teams, while 5 skaters and 1 goalie are allowed on the ice at a time. In NHL rules, the periods are 20 minutes long. There are three periods.

The 81-member governing body is the International Ice Hockey Federation, (IIHF). Ice hockey has been played at the Winter Olympics since 1924, and was in the 1920 Summer Olympics. North America's National Hockey League is the strongest professional ice hockey league, drawing top ice hockey players from around the globe. The NHL rules are slightly different from those used in Olympic hockey.

Ice hockey sticks are long L-shaped sticks made of wood, graphite, or composites with a blade at the bottom that can lie flat on the playing surface when the stick is held upright and can curve either way as to help a left- or right-handed player gain an advantage.

There are early representations and reports of hockey-type games being played on ice in the Netherlands, and reports from Canada from the beginning of the nineteenth century, but the modern game was initially organized by students at McGill University, Montreal in 1875 and, by two years later, codified the first set of ice hockey rules and organized the first teams.

== Lacrosse ==
Lacrosse is played mainly in North America, however, countries such as the United Kingdom and Australia have small lacrosse leagues. It has also expanded into both Europe and Asia, with the latter forming the Asia Pacific Lacrosse Union (APLU) in May 2012. The United States currently has two top-level professional lacrosse leagues in operation, the Premier Lacrosse League, and the National Lacrosse League.

== Rugby league ==
Rugby league came into existence due to the very issue of professionalism. Rugby football split into 'union' and 'league' over the issue of payment to player. Rugby league favoured payments and has thus been a professional sport since its beginnings in 1895, when 22 clubs based in northern England split from the more amateur-minded Rugby Football Union. The officially amateur RFU had previously brought charges of professionalism against some clubs for their use of "broken time" payments to compensate players for missing work due to matches or injuries received whilst playing. On August 29, 1895, in a meeting at the George Hotel, Huddersfield, the clubs decided to break away and form the Northern Rugby Union, which later would become the Rugby Football League. The rules of rugby league were gradually changed so that now it and rugby union are distinctly different games, however rugby union has since turned professional as well. On 17 December 1967 the first professional Sunday matches of rugby league were played.

== Rugby union ==
Rugby union continued with its amateur ideals past the schism between union and league and throughout much of the 20th century. This position changed in 1995. The threat of big payments from professional rugby league clubs in countries where rugby league had a significant following was becoming too great. A committee conclusion decided that the only way to end this threat, the hypocrisy of Shamateurism and keep control of rugby union was to make the sport professional. On August 26, 1995, the International Rugby Board declared rugby union an "open" game and thus removed all restrictions on payments or benefits to those connected with the game.

== Rodeo/bull riding ==
The PBR is different from the classic rodeo as it consists of only bull riding. It was founded in 1992 because a group of bull riders decided that their sport should be separated from the classic rodeo and could, as it was easily the most popular event. Riders and bulls are judged on a 50-point scale. Riders are only given a score if they stay on for the mandatory 8 seconds, while bull scores are given regardless of what the rider does.

== Ultimate Frisbee ==
See Ultimate Frisbee Association and Major League Ultimate

== See also ==
- List of American and Canadian cities by number of major professional sports franchises
- List of professional sports leagues
