= Dwan Hurt =

American basketball coach and player

Personal information
- Born: March 29, 1963
- Died: November 25, 2016 (aged 53)
- Listed height: 6 ft 0 in (1.83 m)

Career information
- High school: Junipero Serra (Gardena, California)
- College: El Camino College; Gonzaga (1984–1986)
- Position: Point guard
- Coaching career: 1988–2016

Dwan Hurt (March 29, 1963 – November 25, 2016) was an American basketball coach and player. He played college basketball for the Gonzaga Bulldogs as a point guard and later coached at Junipero Serra High School for 27 years.

== College career ==
After graduating from high school in 1981, Hurt attended El Camino College for two years. In 1984 he joined Gonzaga. He earned a starting role midway through his first season, scoring 10 points in that first start against Montana State. In February 1985, he scored a buzzer beater to beat Loyola Marymount 51–49. In 25 games, including 15 starts, he averaged 4.8 points and 3.3 assists. As a senior, Hurt started in 25 of the team's 28 games, averaging 4.7 points and 2.1 assists per game.

== Coaching career ==
After coaching the lower level basketball teams at Serra, Hurt became the head varsity coach after the departure of long-time coach George "Mac" McDaniel to Marymount College in Palos Verdes, CA. Hurt was named 2010 State Coach of the Year by Cal-Hi Sports; Daily Breeze Coach of the Year 2010; and coached his high school alma mater, the Serra Cavaliers, to the 2010 California Interscholastic Federation Division III Boys Basketball State Championship. He also led Serra to State Division IV title in 1993. Hurt coached Serra for 28 seasons and led the Cavaliers to eight CIF Southern Section titles and two CIF State titles. He won his 500th game in late 2013 and was among the winningest active coaches in the state.

== Personal life ==
Hurt's brother, Cedric Hurt, was also a basketball coach and the brothers refereed CYO football games together for years.

Hurt died in his sleep on November 25, 2016.
