= Carl Ihenacho =

American football player (born 1988)

No. 53
- Position: Linebacker

Personal information
- Born: May 28, 1988 (age 38); Carson, California, U.S.
- Listed height: 6 ft 2 in (1.88 m)
- Listed weight: 250 lb (113 kg)

Career information
- High school: Junípero Serra (Gardena, California)
- College: San Jose State
- NFL draft: 2010: undrafted

Career history
- San Diego Chargers (2011)*; Oakland Raiders (2011–2012)
- * Offseason or practice squad member only

Awards and highlights
- 2× Second-team All-WAC (2008, 2009); New Mexico Bowl champion (2006)

Career NFL statistics
- Total tackles: 1
- Stats at Pro Football Reference

Carl Isioma Ihenacho (born May 28, 1988) is an American former professional football player who was a linebacker in the National Football League (NFL). He played college football for the San Jose State Spartans.

== Early life ==
Carl Ihenacho was born in Carson, California, and is of Nigerian descent. Although Ihenacho's mother did not allow Carl or his younger brother Duke to play Pop Warner football, Duke Ihenacho joined the football team at Junipero Serra High School at Gardena, California in senior year. At Serra, Carl Ihenacho played the defensive end and tight end positions. Ihenacho was also a second-team all-league pick and his team's Rookie of the Year in 2005.

== College career ==
Ihenacho played at San Jose State University and started 31 games. He was a two-time second-team All-Western Athletic Conference honoree during his four seasons at San Jose State. He ranks number five on the university’s career list for tackles for loss (33.5) and is tied for fifth in quarterback sacks with 17. In December 2009, he graduated one semester early with a bachelor's degree in psychology. Carl Ihenacho played at San Jose State with his younger brother Duke Ihenacho from the 2007 to 2009 seasons. In 2008, ESPN ranked Carl and Duke Ihenacho as one of the top ten brother combinations in college football for being among the top defensive players in FBS football.

== Professional career ==
Pre-draft measurables
Height	Weight	Hand span	40-yard dash	Bench press
6 ft 2 in (1.88 m)	255 lb (116 kg)	8 7/8 in (0.23 m)	5.1 s	20 reps
40-yard dash from Pro Day at San Jose State; all other measurables from the NFL Scouting Combine

On January 26, 2011, Ihenacho signed a reserve/future contract with the San Diego Chargers. Ihenacho participated in training camp with the Chargers until being waived on September 3, 2011. On December 7, 2011, Ihenacho signed with the Oakland Raiders practice squad.

Ihenacho debuted professionally in Week 1 of the 2012 season (September 10), a Monday Night Football game and 22-14 home loss to the Chargers. In Week 2 (September 16), a 35-13 loss to the Miami Dolphins, Ihenacho recorded his first tackle as a professional.

On September 25, 2012, the Raiders waived Ihenacho, but re-signed him to the practice squad two days later. On October 2, 2012, the Raiders cut Ihenacho.

Ihenacho retired from football to become a personal trainer after being released.
