= Profit Investment Management =

American investment advisory firm

Profit Investment Management, LLC.
- Company type: Limited Liability Company
- Industry: Investments
- Founded: 1996; 30 years ago
- Founder: Eugene Profit
- Headquarters: Bethesda, MD, United States
- Area served: Worldwide
- Key people: Eugene Profit (President, CEO & Portfolio manager)
- Products: Asset management
- AUM: $2 billion
- Website: www.profitfunds.com

Profit Investment Management, LLC is an American investment management firm based in Bethesda, MD. The Firm was founded in 1996 by Eugene Profit, the current president, CEO, and portfolio manager of the firm. Profit Investment Management manages large-cap, small-cap and ESG equity portfolios.

== History ==
Profit Investment Management was founded in 1996 by Eugene Profit as Investor Resources Group. The firm began with $300,000 of capital under management. After taking over the position of portfolio manager on November 1, 1997, Eugene launched the Profit Fund, the firm's flagship retail mutual fund. Under Profit's management, the Profit Fund rose 62% from late 1997 to 1999, compared with 51% for the S&P 500.

On July 9, 1999, the Profit Fund was given a 5-star rating from Mutual Funds Magazine, and has provided rates of returns surpassing those of the S&P 500, Russell 1000, and Russell 2000.

On June 30, 2000, the Profit Fund was ranked Number 2 among 232 large-cap value funds with a three-year average annual return of 23.22%.

In June 2008, Profit Investment Management was named one of the nation's largest black-owned businesses by Black Enterprise Magazine, ranking 14th in the Asset Manager category. The firm had $1.358 billion under management at the time.

As of December 31, 2009, the firm's asset under management reached approximately $1.7 billion.

== Investment Style ==
Profit is often cited for its unique investment strategy which combines elements of value and growth investing. Over the firm's 14-year history, the strategy has evolved from a "value strategy with a growth overlay" to a "valuation-sensitive growth strategy," which selects growth stocks deemed as mispriced relative to their peers and their own price history. The expectation of the strategy is that a catalyst will eventually incite investors to re-evaluate such stocks, thereby causing prices of these equities to rise.

== Profit in the Media ==
Profit Investment Management has appeared on several financial media sources. The firm's CEO and several of its employees have provided financial commentary on prominent financial news networks including Business Week, SmartMoney, Black Enterprise, Pension & Investments, Investor's Business Daily, Dow Jones Newswires, The Wall Street Transcript, Wall Street Week, Money Line, CNBC, and CNN.
