= Gary E. Liebl =

American businessman

Gary E. Liebl is an American business leader, founding chairman of the board (ret.), QLogic, chairman emeritus at Chaminade University of Honolulu.
