= Eugene Profit =

American football player and investor (born 1964)

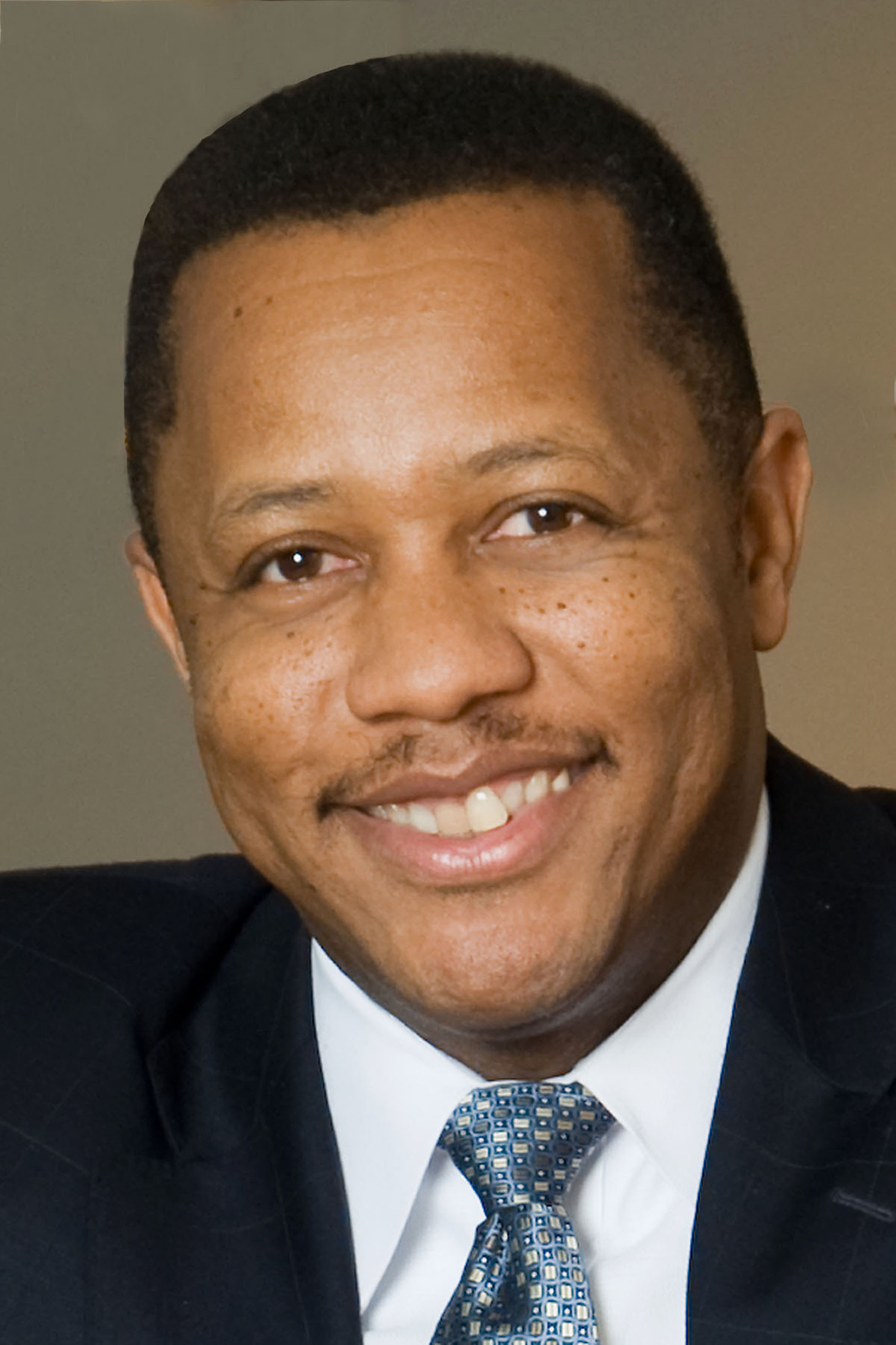
- Eugene Profit
- Born: November 11, 1964 (age 62); Baton Rouge, Louisiana, US
- Education: Yale University
- Occupations: President, CEO, Managing Director of Profit Investment Management

Eugene A. Profit is an American investor, entrepreneur, philanthropist and former American football cornerback for the New England Patriots and Washington Redskins. He is the founder, president, CEO, and portfolio manager of Profit Investment Management, an investment management firm in the Washington, DC metropolitan area.

Profit's investment philosophy and approach to valuation-sensitive growth investing has made him the subject of profiles in the financial media, including Business Week, SmartMoney, Black Enterprise, Pension & Investments, and Investor's Business Daily. He has also been a guest on Wall Street Week, Money Line, CNBC, CNN, Bloomberg and other prominent financial news networks.

== Early life ==
Eugene was born in Baton Rouge, Louisiana in 1964, November 11. He grew up with four siblings and his mother Shirley Profit in Los Angeles, California, and attended Serra High School. He received his B.A. from Yale University. During his time at Yale, he majored in economics; competed on the university's track team, setting the school record for the 60-yard dash and long jump (which he still holds) and played on the Yale football team, receiving All-American honors.

== College football ==
During his first season of varsity football as a sophomore in 1983, he was involved in 40 tackles (25 solos) and recovered one fumble. He set Yale single season records for kick returns (20) and kick return yardage (328) for a 16.4 average. He also had three receptions for 55 yards (18.3 average) from wingback spot, rushed the ball four times for 19 yards (4.8 average) and threw one pass (incomplete). During his junior year, Eugene moved from wingback position to defensive back. He spent his entire senior year (1985) in the defensive backfield and started all 10 games for 4-4-1 club beating rival Harvard in The Game, 17-6. He had one interception, a 37-yard return, vs. Holy Cross and was selected honorable mention All-Ivy.

== NFL ==
After graduating from Yale, he was immediately recruited by the New England Patriots, and signed as a free agent in 1986. He played 3 seasons as a cornerback for the team before being acquired by the Washington Redskins.

Profit played in his first pro game at New Orleans on 11-30-86, blocking a punt with 3:41 left. He played in the last four regular season games with three first-hit tackles from the line of scrimmage and at Denver in the playoff game with one first-hit tackle from the line of scrimmage.

In the 1987 season, he played in seven games, making two tackles (two solos) and one blocked punt vs. the Philadelphia Eagles on November 29, 1987. He also had two special teams tackles (two solos), and knocked down one pass at Buffalo on December 20, 1987. He played in one game in the 1988 season.

After joining the Washington Redskins in 1989, he tore a hamstring in the first exhibition game. He was given a chance to return to the field contingent on him undergoing 2 years of intensive physical therapy; however, he chose to leave the National Football League, and pursue a career in financial services.

At the end of his football career in 1990, Profit earned his peak NFL salary of $200,000.

== Post-NFL ==
After injuring his hamstring, Profit left the National Football League, initially exploring a career as bakery owner but quickly moved on to the financial services industry. He began as a financial consultant at Legg Mason in 1994.

In 1996, he left Legg Mason to start his own investment management firm Profit Investment Management, serving as the firm's President and Chief executive Officer.

== Profit Investments ==
Profit founded Profit Investment Management in 1996. He began as the firm's President and Chief Executive Officer but later took on the role of Portfolio Manager in 1997.

=== Investment philosophy ===
Profit's investment philosophy is similar to traditional value strategies that look for fundamentally undervalued companies; however, he does not adhere to traditional price-to-earnings and price-to-book ratios. His strategy focuses on finding mispriced growth stocks that he believes can benefit from investor's revaluation of the relationship between the company's fundamentals and the stock's price.

== Charitable causes ==
Profit is also active in philanthropy and contributes to programs that aim to help the community and improve financial literacy. Programs to which he contributes to include the NASDAQ "Stock Market in Schools" Program, Boys and Girls Club, Providence Health Foundation, and the Montgomery County Community Foundation.
