= Jock tax =

Income tax levied against money-earning visitors

In the United States, the jock tax is the colloquially named income tax levied against visitors to a city or state who earn money in that jurisdiction. Since a state cannot afford to track the many individuals who do business on an itinerant basis, the ones targeted are usually high profile and very wealthy, namely professional athletes. Not only are the working schedules of famous sports players public, so are their salaries. The state can compute and collect the amount with very little investment of time and effort.

== History ==
While "jock taxes" date to the 1960s, states started aggressively taxing the income of non-resident athletes in 1991, when California imposed the tax on the earnings of Chicago Bulls players who traveled to Los Angeles to play the Lakers in that year's NBA Finals. Illinois soon retaliated, imposing its own "jock tax" on out-of-state players—although Illinois' tax is only imposed on athletes from jurisdictions that impose jock taxes on Illinois-based players. Other states followed suit; by 2014, the only U.S. jurisdictions with major professional teams without a jock tax were Florida, Texas, Washington state, and Washington, D.C. (the three states do not impose personal income taxes, while the U.S. Congress specifically prohibits the District of Columbia from imposing its income tax on non-residents who work there).

States are not the only U.S. jurisdictions that impose jock taxes. Several cities impose their own jock taxes on top of those levied by their states.

For example, in 2005, the city of Pittsburgh assessed what it called the "Non-Resident Sports Facility Usage Fee" (NSFUF), a 3% tax on income derived from an individual's participation in any paid-admission event in a publicly funded venue, as long as the individual is not a city resident. A 2025 Pennsylvania Supreme Court ruling, however, declared Pittsburgh's NSFUF unconstitutional under Pennsylvania law, noting that other "noting that nonresident workers are not subject to the school tax" as the visiting athletes were.

== In depth ==
The following is an in-depth analysis of modern-day examples and criticisms of the jock tax.

=== Examples ===
==== Alex Rodriguez ====
After the 2000 Major League Baseball season, Alex Rodriguez signed what was then the largest contract in American sports history, a ten-year contract worth $252 million, with the Texas Rangers. The tax collecting authorities of other states were notified alongside the public, and would separately demand that Rodriguez's employer withhold the tax due from his salary and remit it to each of them. Even though the state of Texas did not have an income tax, he still had to pay the various state income taxes applied to each away game in each location except for Florida, Illinois, Washington state, and Washington, D.C. (as an American League player, he would visit the three states every season. There was no team in Washington DC while he was with the Rangers). It is estimated that Rodriguez paid $520,000 a year for state income taxes outside his own state.

==== Tennessee "privilege tax" ====
Tennessee, which before 2021 had a limited income tax that excluded wages and salaries and now has no state income tax at all, began imposing its own special form of jock tax in July 2009, which it called a "privilege tax", and later repealed in April 2014. The tax was unique in several respects. First, it was a flat-rate tax of $2,500 per game, imposed on all players who were on a team's roster for a game in the state, including Tennessee residents. However, the tax applied to a maximum of three games per calendar year. In another quirk, NFL players were exempt—when first imposed, the tax only applied to NBA and NHL players. In addition, the tax did not go to the state treasury. Instead, taxes imposed on NHL players went to the operators of Bridgestone Arena in Nashville, home to the Nashville Predators, while taxes imposed on NBA players went to the operators of FedExForum in Memphis, home to the Memphis Grizzlies (both teams are Tennessee's only representatives in their respective leagues). Finally, because the tax was categorized as a fee, it could not be claimed as a deduction on other states' tax returns.

Because of the quirks of the tax, some players on visiting teams were required to pay more in privilege taxes than they earned from games played in the state. Another individual who was disproportionately affected by the tax was Chris Johnson, who earned $54,000 for eight games with the Grizzlies under two 10-day contracts in 2013, but was still subject to the full $7,500 privilege tax—the same amount collected from Grizzlies players who were on the team for an entire calendar year. The collective bargaining agreement that ended the 2012–13 NHL lockout called for team owners to pay their players' privilege taxes.

The Tennessee privilege tax was repealed in April 2014; the lead sponsor of the repeal bill noted that because the tax was imposed on NBA and NHL players but not on NFL players, it was constitutionally suspect. It stopped being collected from NHL players starting with the 2014–15 season, while the tax continued to be collected from NBA players through the 2015–16 season.

==== Andrew McCutchen ====
In 2015, Andrew McCutchen, then an outfielder with the Pittsburgh Pirates, inadvertently left the first page of his direct deposit pay stub for May 1–15 in the visitors' clubhouse at Wrigley Field after the Pirates finished a three-game series against the Chicago Cubs. The stub was found by a visitor during a stadium tour and posted online. (McCutchen was not financially harmed by the exposure because the posted stub contained no bank routing numbers.) It revealed that he had state taxes for Illinois and Missouri, as well as city taxes for Philadelphia and St. Louis, withheld. In addition, Arizona, Ohio, and the city of Cincinnati were listed as potential tax recipients, but no money was withheld for those jurisdictions because the Pirates did not play in those places during the stated period. The stub also indicated that other taxable locales were "continued on next stub", which was not found by the visitor and thus never posted.

==== Brock Osweiler ====
A 2018 Sports Illustrated story on NFL players' tax situations began by examining the unusual 2017 tax situation of Brock Osweiler. In 2016, Osweiler played for the Houston Texans in the income tax-free state of Texas, giving him what writer Andrew Feldman called a "tax filing [that] was about as simple as you can get for an NFL player", paying other states only for the days he actually spent in those jurisdictions. At the time, he maintained his residency in Texas. During the 2017 offseason, he was traded to the Cleveland Browns, but was cut after the team's last preseason game and picked up by the Denver Broncos, with the Browns paying almost all of his $16 million contract for that season while he played in seven games for the Broncos. Feldman added, "So what did his tax bill come to? The experts say ... they’re not sure. (emphasis in original)

In 2017, Osweiler was indisputably liable for about $150,000 in Ohio state income tax for the time he spent in the Browns' preseason training camp at Baldwin Wallace University in Berea. However, even though the Browns paid almost all of his season salary, an attorney with the Ohio Department of Taxation told SI that even though almost all of his income that year came from an Ohio source, the state could not tax him on income that was earned while he was not present in the state (assuming that Osweiler did not become an Ohio resident). According to several tax accountants consulted by SI, Osweiler was liable for $600,000 in Colorado income tax based on his time spent in that state, plus another $150,000 to the other states in which he played in 2017. One accountant suggested a different possibility:

One CPA suggests that Ohio and Colorado could both claim they deserve that $600,000, forcing an appeal and possible federal court case. The result could depend on whether the Browns paid Osweiler a lump sum before he left Ohio, or if he continued getting weekly payouts.(emphasis in original)

=== Criticism of the "jock tax" ===
In 2003, the Tax Foundation conducted a study on the jock tax. It concluded that the tax is:

- Poorly targeted
- Arbitrarily enforced
- Unrealistically burdensome to athletes

According to the foundation, the jock tax "forces traveling professionals to file potentially dozens of state and local income tax returns annually." The foundation argues that the jock tax is poor tax policy.

An analyst for the foundation pointed out in 2014 that because taxes are imposed on everyone who travels with a professional sports team, many individuals subject to the tax are not the stereotypical highly-paid athletes:

Many trainers and scouts do not earn much more than the national median income, and players earning the league minimum in some leagues, such as Major League Soccer, earn only around $35,000 per year. This can lead to a substantial tax complexity burden because many team members have to file income taxes in around 15–20 states each year. ... the tax hits many people who may not be able to easily absorb the substantial compliance costs associated with the tax.

The aforementioned 2018 SI story further illustrated this complexity. Because the Dallas Cowboys split their 2017 training camp between Oxnard, California and Texas, wide receiver Dez Bryant was subject to $10,000 in state income tax for every day the team spent in Oxnard. In the same year, the Miami Dolphins trained in Oxnard in the days following Hurricane Irma, subjecting the team's on-site personnel to California's income tax for that period. Ndamukong Suh was subject to more than $50,000 in California income tax during this time. One unnamed 2016 All-Pro had federal, state, and city tax filings for that year that totaled 400 pages, and during the team's bye week went on a vacation to income tax-free Florida that saved him $20,000 in income taxes.

One major sports league was able to partly address this issue. MLB successfully lobbied Arizona in the 1990s for an exemption from non-resident state income taxes during spring training. Since that time, the only players who are subject to Arizona income tax during spring training are those who make their permanent residence in the state. Similarly, during the season, the only players who are subject to non-resident Arizona income tax are those present for Arizona Diamondbacks games.

== See also ==
- Taxation in the United States
