= 1987 St. Louis Cardinals (NFL) season =

NFL team season

1987 St. Louis Cardinals season
- Owner: Bill Bidwill
- Head coach: Gene Stallings
- Home stadium: Busch Stadium

Results
- Record: 7–8
- Division place: 3rd NFC East
- Playoffs: Did not qualify
- Pro Bowlers: QB Neil Lomax; OT Luis Sharpe; FB Ron Wolfley; PR Vai Sikahema

The 1987 St. Louis Cardinals season was the franchise's 68th season in the National Football League and the 28th and final season in St. Louis as the team moved to Tempe, Arizona in March 1988. This move left St. Louis without an NFL franchise until the Los Angeles Rams moved there in 1995 to play, only to relocate back to Los Angeles in 2016, once again leaving St. Louis without an NFL team.

== Offseason ==
=== NFL draft ===
1987 St. Louis Cardinals draft
Round	Pick	Player	Position	College	Notes
1	6	Kelly Stouffer	QB	Colorado State	Refused to sign with team
2	34	Tim McDonald *	S	USC	
3	62	Rob Awalt	TE	San Diego State	
3	70	Colin Scotts	DT	Hawaii	
4	90	Rod Saddler	DT	Texas A&M	
5	118	George Swarn	RB	Miami (OH)	
5	126	John Bruno	P	Penn State	
5	127	Ilia Jarostchuk	LB	New Hampshire	
6	146	Mark Garalczyk	DT	Western Michigan	
7	174	Tim Peoples	DB	Washington	
7	195	William Harris	TE	Bishop	
8	201	Steve Alvord	DT	Washington	
9	229	Wayne Davis	LB	Alabama	
10	257	Charles Wright	DB	Tulsa	
11	285	Todd Peat	OG	Northern Illinois	
Made roster * Made at least one Pro Bowl during career

== Personnel ==
=== Staff ===
1987 St. Louis Cardinals staff
Front office: President – Bill Bidwill; Director of pro personnel – Larry Wilson; Director of player personnel – George Boone; Head coaches: Head coach – Gene Stallings; Offensive coaches: Offensive coordinator – Jim Shofner; Running backs – Hank Kuhlmann; Receivers – Mal Moore; Offensive line – Tom Bresnahan; Special assistant/quality control – Leon McLaughlin	Defensive coaches: Defensive line – Jim Johnson; Linebackers – Joe Pascale; Defensive backs – Mel Renfro; Special teams coaches: Special teams – Marv Braden; Strength and conditioning: Strength and conditioning – LeBaron Caruthers

=== NFL replacement players ===
After the league decided to use replacement players during the NFLPA strike, the following team was assembled:

1987 St. Louis Cardinals replacement roster
Quarterbacks: 19 Shawn Halloran; 16 Shane Lamb; 12 Gregg Tipton; 10 Sammy Garza; Running backs: 33 Derrick McAdoo; 36 Vai Sikahema; 37 Larry Cowan; 37 Broderick Sargent; 40 Don Goodman; 35 Robert Mimbs; 34 Eric Drains; Wide receivers: 81 Roy Green; 84 J. T. Smith; 85 Clarence Collins; 87 Troy Johnson; 87 Gill Stegall; 85 Kenny Nash; 80 Lonnie Turner; 83 Ron Brown; 86 Fred Lane; Tight ends: 89 William Harris; 80 Bob Keseday	Offensive linemen: 62 Ray Brown; 66 Tom Welter; 75 Charlie Vatterott; 70 Victor Perry; 64 Joe Bock; 56 Ron Pasquale; 51 Keith Radecic; Defensive linemen: 75 Curtis Greer; 76 Mark Garalczyk; 79 Gary Dulin; 78 Ron Bohm; 71 Victor Burnett; 73 Jim Pauciello; 72 Anthony Burke	Linebackers: 54 Phil Forney; 53 Bill Altena; 50 Tony Buford; 52 Jimmie Carter; 58 Terence Mack; 57 Pete Noga; 55 Paul Savage; Defensive backs: 20 Dwayne Anderson; 20 Travis Curtis; 45 Leonard Smith; 21 Mark Jackson; 22 Terrence Anthony; 41 Richard Atkinson; 38 Mark Mathis; 25 Ken Sims; 27 Tony Mayes; 23 Ed Scott; 48 Jeff Colter; 48 Garcia Lane; Special teams: 13 Jim Gallery K; 17 Jason Staurovsky K; 14 Greg Cater P; 14 Mark Royals P; 11 Mike Crow P

=== Roster ===
1987 St. Louis Cardinals roster
Quarterbacks (QB): 10 Sammy Garza; 15 Neil Lomax; 18 Cliff Stoudt; Running backs (RB): 33 Derrick McAdoo; 30 Stump Mitchell; 39 Broderick Sargent; 36 Vai Sikahema; 24 Ron Wolfley; Wide receivers (WR): 82 Ron Brown; 81 Roy Green; 83 Don Holmes; 87 Troy Johnson; 84 J. T. Smith; Tight ends (TE): 80 Robert Awalt; 89 William Harris; 85 Jay Novacek	Offensive linemen (OL): 62 Ray Brown G; 74 Gene Chilton T; 70 Derek Kennard C; 64 Todd Peat G; 63 Tootie Robbins T; 51 Mike Ruether C; 67 Luis Sharpe T; 61 Lance Smith G; 66 Tom Welter T; Defensive linemen (DL): 60 Steve Alvord DT; 79 Bob Clasby DT; 65 David Galloway DE; 76 Mark Garalczyk DT; 53 Freddie Joe Nunn DE; 72 Rod Saddler DE; 69 Colin Scotts DT	Linebackers (LB): 52 Charles Baker OLB; 55 Anthony Bell OLB; 53 Wayne Davis OLB; 50 Ilia Jarostchuk MLB; 54 E. J. Junior OLB; 57 Niko Noga MLB; Defensive backs (DB): 41 Carl Carter CB; 20 Travis Curtis FS; 21 Mark Jackson CB; 27 Gregg Johnson SS; 47 Cedric Mack CB; 46 Tim McDonald SS; 45 Leonard Smith SS; 43 Lonnie Young FS; Special teams (ST): 17 Al Del Greco K; 13 Jim Gallery K; 11 Greg Horne P; 68 Mike Morris LS	Reserve: 71 Joe Bostic G (IR); 14 Greg Cater P (IR); 73 Mark Duda DT (IR); 31 Earl Ferrell FB (IR); 75 Curtis Greer DE (IR); 26 Tim Peoples S (IR); -- Charlie Vatterott G (IR); Rookies in italics

== Regular season ==
=== Schedule ===
Week	Date	Opponent	Result	Record	Venue	Attendance
1	September 13	**Dallas Cowboys**	**W** 24–13	1–0	Busch Stadium	47,241
2	September 20	at San Diego Chargers	**L** 24–28	1–1	Jack Murphy Stadium	47,988
–	September 27	Indianapolis Colts	canceled	1–1	Busch Stadium	
3	October 4	at **Washington Redskins**	**L** 21–28	1–2	RFK Stadium	27,728
4	October 11	New Orleans Saints	**W** 24–19	2–2	Busch Stadium	11,795
5	October 18	at San Francisco 49ers	**L** 28–34	2–3	Candlestick Park	38,094
6	October 25	at **New York Giants**	**L** 7–30	2–4	Giants Stadium	74,391
7	November 1	**Philadelphia Eagles**	**L** 23–28	2–5	Busch Stadium	24,586
8	November 8	Tampa Bay Buccaneers	**W** 31–28	3–5	Busch Stadium	22,449
9	November 15	Los Angeles Rams	**L** 24–27	3–6	Busch Stadium	27,730
10	November 22	at **Philadelphia Eagles**	**W** 31–19	4–6	Veterans Stadium	55,592
11	November 29	at Atlanta Falcons	**W** 34–21	5–6	Atlanta–Fulton County Stadium	15,909
12	December 6	**Washington Redskins**	**L** 17–34	5–7	Busch Stadium	31,324
13	December 13	**New York Giants**	**W** 27–24	6–7	Busch Stadium	29,623
14	December 20	at Tampa Bay Buccaneers	**W** 31–14	7–7	Tampa Stadium	32,046
15	December 27	at **Dallas Cowboys**	**L** 16–21	7–8	Texas Stadium	36,788
Note: Intra-division opponents are in **bold** text.

=== Game summaries ===
==== Week 1: vs. Dallas Cowboys ====
Week 1: Dallas Cowboys at St. Louis Cardinals

Quarter	1	2	3	4	Total
Cowboys	0	6	0	7	**13**
**Cardinals**	3	0	0	21	**24**

at Busch Stadium, St. Louis, Missouri

- Date: September 13
- Game time: 12:00 p.m. CDT
- Game weather: 72 °F (22 °C)
- Game attendance: 47,241
- TV: CBS

==== Week 3: at Washington Redskins ====
Week 3: St. Louis Cardinals at Washington Redskins

Quarter	1	2	3	4	Total
Cardinals	0	7	7	7	**21**
**Redskins**	7	7	14	0	**28**

at RFK Stadium, Washington, D.C.

- Date: October 4
- Game time: 12:00 p.m. CDT/1:00 p.m. EDT
- Game weather: 50 °F (10 °C)
- Game attendance: 27,728
- Referee: Jerry Seeman
- TV announcers (CBS): Tim Ryan and Joe Theismann
- Box score

Game information

**First quarter**

- WAS – Anthony Allen 34-yard pass from Ed Rubbert (Brendan Toibin kick), 1:20. Redskins 7–0.

**Second quarter**

- STL – Earl Ferrell 1-yard run (Jason Staurovsky kick), 9:28. Tied 7–7.
- WAS – Anthony Allen 88-yard pass from Ed Rubbert (Brendan Toibin kick), 9:05. Redskins 14–7.

**Third quarter**

- STL – Earl Ferrell 1-yard run (Jason Staurovsky kick), 8:01. Tied 14–14.
- WAS – Lionel Vital 8-yard run (Brendan Toibin kick), 5:24. Redskins 21–14.
- WAS – Anthony Allen 48-yard pass from Ed Rubbert (Brendan Toibin kick), 2:02. Redskins 28–14.

**Fourth quarter**

- STL – Pete Noga 60-yard interception return (Jason Staurovsky kick), 12:17. Redskins 28–21.

**Top passers**

- STL – Shawn Halloran – 16/35, 258 yards
- WAS – Ed Rubbert – 14/24, 334 yards, 3 TD, INT

**Top rushers**

- STL – Earl Ferrell – 27 rushes, 87 yards, 2 TD
- WAS – Lionel Vital – 27 rushes, 82 yards, TD

**Top receivers**

- STL – J. T. Smith – 6 receptions, 116 yards
- WAS – Anthony Allen – 7 receptions, 255 yards, 3 TD

==== Week 8: vs. Tampa Bay Buccaneers ====
Week 8: Tampa Bay Buccaneers at St. Louis Cardinals

Quarter	1	2	3	4	Total
Buccaneers	7	7	14	0	**28**
**Cardinals**	0	3	0	28	**31**

at Busch Stadium, St. Louis, Missouri

- Date: November 8
- Game time: 12:00 p.m. EST
- Game weather: 58 °F (14 °C)
- Game attendance: 22,449
- Referee: Pat Haggerty
- TV announcers (CBS): Jack Buck and Will McDonough
- Box score

Game information

**First quarter**

- TB – Mark Carrier 5-yard pass from Steve DeBerg (Donald Igwebuike kick). Buccaneers 7–0.

**Second quarter**

- TB – Gerald Carter 3-yard pass from Steve DeBerg (Donald Igwebuike kick). Buccaneers 14–0.
- STL – Jim Gallery 31-yard field goal. Buccaneers 14–3.

**Third quarter**

- TB – Jeff Smith 34-yard pass from Steve DeBerg (Donald Igwebuike kick). Buccaneers 21–3.
- TB – Jeff Smith 3-yard run (Donald Igwebuike kick). Buccaneers 28–3.

**Fourth quarter**

- STL – Robert Awalt 4-yard pass from Neil Lomax (Jim Gallery kick). Buccaneers 28–10.
- STL – Niko Noga 24-yard fumble return (Jim Gallery kick). Buccaneers 28–17.
- STL – J. T. Smith 11-yard pass from Neil Lomax (Jim Gallery kick). Buccaneers 28–24.
- STL – J. T. Smith 17-yard pass from Neil Lomax (Jim Gallery kick). Cardinals 31–28.

**Top passers**

- TB – Steve DeBerg – 23/37, 303 yards, 3 TD
- STL – Neil Lomax – 25/36, 314 yards, 3 TD, INT

**Top rushers**

- TB – James Wilder – 11 rushes, 49 yards
- STL – Stump Mitchell – 17 rushes, 79 yards

**Top receivers**

- TB – James Wilder – 6 receptions, 87 yards
- STL – Robert Awalt – 9 receptions, 124 yards, TD

Days before the game Cardinals owner Bill Bidwill announced that the team would be moving to another city. The announcement increased fan apathy, resulting in an official game attendance of only 22,449, the Cardinals' lowest in four years.

Entering the fourth quarter, the Cardinals were down 28–3 to the Buccaneers. St. Louis would score 28 unanswered points in the final quarter to win 31–28. Tampa kicker Donald Igwebuike attempted a 53-yard field goal to tie the game as time expired but the ball bounced off the crossbar. The Cardinals' 25-point fourth quarter comeback is the largest in NFL history.

==== Week 13: vs. Washington Redskins ====
Week 13: Washington Redskins at St. Louis Cardinals

Quarter	1	2	3	4	Total
**Redskins**	10	0	21	3	**34**
Cardinals	0	14	3	0	**17**

at Busch Stadium, St. Louis, Missouri

- Date: December 6
- Game time: 12:00 p.m. CST
- Game weather: 39 °F (4 °C)
- Game attendance: 31,324
- Referee: Tom Dooley
- TV announcers (CBS): Tim Ryan and Joe Theismann
- Box score

Game information

**First quarter**

- WAS – Gary Clark 84-yard pass from Jay Schroeder (Ali Haji-Sheikh kick). Redskins 7–0.
- WAS – Ali Haji-Sheikh 22-yard field goal. Redskins 10–0.

**Second quarter**

- STL – Stump Mitchell 3-yard pass from Neil Lomax (Jim Gallery kick). Redskins 10–7.
- STL – J. T. Smith 4-yard pass from Neil Lomax (Jim Gallery kick). Cardinals 14–10.

**Third quarter**

- STL – Jim Gallery 48-yard field goal. Cardinals 17–10.
- WAS – Jay Schroeder 7-yard run (Ali Haji-Sheikh kick). Tied 17–17.
- WAS – George Rogers 6-yard run (Ali Haji-Sheikh kick). Redskins 24–17.
- WAS – Clint Didier 19-yard pass from Jay Schroeder (Ali Haji-Sheikh kick). Redskins 31–17.

**Fourth quarter**

- WAS – Ali Haji-Sheikh 40-yard field goal. Redskins 34–17.

**Top passers**

- WAS – Jay Schroeder – 13/25, 235 yards, 2 TD, INT
- STL – Neil Lomax – 21/39, 241 yards, 2 TD

**Top rushers**

- WAS – George Rogers – 29 rushes, 133 yards, TD
- STL – Stump Mitchell – 20 rushes, 101 yards

**Top receivers**

- WAS – Gary Clark – 5 receptions, 130 yards, TD
- STL – Roy Green – 6 receptions, 90 yards

==== Week 14: vs. New York Giants ====
Week 14: New York Giants at St. Louis Cardinals

Quarter	1	2	3	4	Total
Giants	7	3	7	7	**24**
**Cardinals**	14	13	0	0	**27**

at Busch Stadium, St. Louis, Missouri

- Date: December 13
- Game time: 3:00 p.m. EST
- Game weather: 34 °F (1 °C)
- Game attendance: 29,623
- TV announcers (CBS): Dick Stockton and Terry Bradshaw

This would be the Cardinals' final home game in St. Louis as the franchise would relocate to the Phoenix metro area for the 1988 season. This would be the last NFL game played in St. Louis until September 10, 1995 when the Rams, who had relocated to St. Louis from Los Angeles following the 1994 season, hosted the New Orleans Saints. However, the Rams would move back to Los Angeles prior to the 2016 season.

==== Week 15: at Dallas Cowboys ====
Week 15: St. Louis Cardinals at Dallas Cowboys

Quarter	1	2	3	4	Total
Cardinals	3	7	0	6	**16**
**Cowboys**	0	14	0	7	**21**

at Texas Stadium, Irving, Texas

- Date: December 27
- Game time: 12:00 p.m. CST
- Game weather: 35 °F (2 °C)
- Game attendance: 36,788
- TV announcers (CBS): Dick Stockton and Terry Bradshaw

Entering the final week of the season, the Cardinals needed a win over the Cowboys to secure the NFC's final wild card spot. The Cardinals wound up losing the regular season finale, knocking them out of playoff contention. This would be the final game for the St. Louis Cardinals NFL team. On March 15, 1988, NFL owners approved the Cardinals' move from St. Louis to Tempe, Arizona. Starting with the following season, the Cardinals played as the Phoenix Cardinals before changing the franchise's geographic name to the Arizona Cardinals prior to the 1994 season.

=== Standings ===
NFC East
	W	L	T	PCT	DIV	CONF	PF	PA	STK
Washington Redskins^{(3)}	11	4	0	.733	7–1	9–3	379	285	W1
Dallas Cowboys	7	8	0	.467	4–4	5–7	340	348	W2
St. Louis Cardinals	7	8	0	.467	3–5	7–7	362	368	L1
Philadelphia Eagles	7	8	0	.467	3–5	4–7	337	380	W2
New York Giants	6	9	0	.400	3–5	4–8	280	312	W2

== Awards and records ==
- Luis Sharpe, NFC Pro Bowl selection
- J.T. Smith, NFL Receiving Leader, 91 Receptions
- J.T. Smith, Led NFL, Receiving Yards, 1,117 yards
- Ron Wolfley, Pro Bowl selection
