= 1989 Phoenix Cardinals season =

NFL team season

- Owner: Bill Bidwill
- General manager: Larry Wilson
- Head coach: Gene Stallings (fired, November 20, 5-6 record); Hank Kuhlmann (interim; 0-5 record)
- Home stadium: Sun Devil Stadium

Results
- Record: 5–11
- Division place: 4th NFC East
- Playoffs: Did not qualify
- Pro Bowlers: T Luis Sharpe; SS Tim McDonald; P Rich Camarillo

The 1989 Phoenix Cardinals season was the franchise's 70th year with the National Football League (NFL) and the second season in Phoenix. With five games to go in the season, fourth-year coach Gene Stallings announced that he would resign at the end of the season. Instead, general manager Larry Wilson ordered Stallings to leave immediately, and named running backs coach Hank Kuhlmann as interim coach for the rest of the season. The Cardinals were 5–5 through ten games, but finished the season on a six-game losing streak, which knocked them out of the playoffs.

== Offseason ==
=== NFL draft ===
1989 Phoenix Cardinals draft
Round	Pick	Player	Position	College	Notes
1	10	Eric Hill	Linebacker	LSU	
1	17	Joe Wolf	Offensive tackle	Boston College	
2	40	Walter Reeves	Tight end	Auburn	
3	67	Mike Zandofsky	Guard	Washington	
4	94	Jim Wahler	Defensive tackle	UCLA	
5	123	Richard Tardits	Linebacker	Georgia	
5	128	David Edeen	Defensive end	Wyoming	
6	150	Jay Taylor	Defensive back	San Jose State	
7	177	Rickey Royal	Defensive back	Sam Houston State	
8	207	John Burch	Running back	Tennessee–Martin	
9	234	Kendall Trainor	Placekicker	Arkansas	
10	261	Chris Becker	Punter	TCU	
11	291	Jeffrey Hunter	Defensive end	Albany State	
12	318	Todd Nelson	Guard	Wisconsin	
Made roster

=== Supplemental draft ===
1989 Phoenix Cardinals draft
Round	Pick	Player	Position	College	Notes
1	2	Timm Rosenbach	Quarterback	Washington State	
Made roster

== Personnel ==
=== Staff ===
1989 Phoenix Cardinals staff
Front office: President – Bill Bidwill; Vice president and general manager – Larry Wilson; Director of pro personnel – Erik Widmark; Director of player personnel – George Boone; Head coaches: Head coach – Gene Stallings (games 1-11) Hank Kuhlmann (games 12-16); Offensive coaches: Offensive coordinator – Jim Shofner; Running backs – Hank Kuhlmann; Receivers – Mal Moore; Offensive line – Mike Solari; Special assistant/quality control – Leon McLaughlin	Defensive coaches: Defensive line – Jim Johnson; Linebackers – Joe Pascale; Defensive backs – Dennis Thurman; Special teams coaches: Special teams – Marv Braden; Strength and conditioning: Strength and conditioning – LeBaron Caruthers

=== Roster ===
1989 Phoenix Cardinals roster
Quarterbacks (QB): 5 Gary Hogeboom; 3 Timm Rosenbach; 19 Tom Tupa; Running backs (RB): 44 Tony Baker; 45 Lydell Carr; 31 Earl Ferrell FB; 32 Tony Jordan; 36 Vai Sikahema; 24 Ron Wolfley; Wide receivers (WR): 87 Michael Barber; 81 Roy Green; 83 Don Holmes; 86 Ernie Jones; 82 Darryl Usher KR; Tight ends (TE): 80 Robert Awalt; 85 Jay Novacek; 89 Walter Reeves	Offensive linemen (OL): 74 Scott Dill T; 57 Kani Kauahi; 70 Derek Kennard C; 63 Tootie Robbins T; 67 Luis Sharpe T; 61 Lance Smith G; 68 Joe Wolf G; 62 Mike Zandofsky G; Defensive linemen (DL): 65 David Galloway DE; 73 Gary Hadd DT; 75 Shawn Knight DE; 78 Freddie Joe Nunn DE; 72 Rod Saddler DE; 66 Jim Wahler DT; 90 Karl Wilson DT	Linebackers (LB): 55 Anthony Bell OLB; 51 Ron Burton OLB; 56 Ken Harvey OLB; 58 Eric Hill MLB; 53 Garth Jax MLB; 50 Ilia Jarostchuk OLB; Defensive backs (DB): 41 Carl Carter CB; 47 Cedric Mack CB; 46 Tim McDonald SS; 27 Jay Taylor CB; 23 Marcus Turner S; 38 Mike Zordich FS; 43 Lonnie Young FS; Special teams (ST): 16 Rich Camarillo P; 17 Al Del Greco K	Practice squad: 33 John Burch RB; 91 Tim Jorden TE; 69 Vernice Smith G; 92 Richard Tardits LB; Reserve: 71 Joe Bostic G (IR); 79 Bob Clasby DT (IR); 52 Randy Kirk LS (IR); 15 Neil Lomax QB (IR); 54 Reggie McKenzie LB (IR); 30 Stump Mitchell RB (IR); -- Andy Schillinger WR (IR); 84 J. T. Smith WR (IR); Rookies in italics 47 active, 8 reserve, 4 practice squad

== Regular season ==
In week 10, Tim McDonald returned an interception 53 yards for a touchdown to beat the Dallas Cowboys.

=== Schedule ===
Week	Date	Opponent	Result	Record	Venue	Attendance	Recap
1	September 10	at Detroit Lions	**W** 16–13	1–0	Pontiac Silverdome	36,735	Recap
2	September 17	at Seattle Seahawks	**W** 34–24	2–0	Kingdome	60,444	Recap
3	September 24	at **New York Giants**	**L** 7–35	2–1	Giants Stadium	75,742	Recap
4	October 1	San Diego Chargers	**L** 13–24	2–2	Sun Devil Stadium	44,201	Recap
5	October 8	at **Washington Redskins**	**L** 28–30	2–3	RFK Stadium	53,335	Recap
6	October 15	**Philadelphia Eagles**	**L** 5–17	2–4	Sun Devil Stadium	42,620	Recap
7	October 22	Atlanta Falcons	**W** 34–20	3–4	Sun Devil Stadium	33,894	Recap
8	October 29	at **Dallas Cowboys**	**W** 19–10	4–4	Texas Stadium	44,431	Recap
9	November 5	**New York Giants**	**L** 13–20	4–5	Sun Devil Stadium	46,588	Recap
10	November 12	**Dallas Cowboys**	**W** 24–20	5–5	Sun Devil Stadium	49,657	Recap
11	November 19	at Los Angeles Rams	**L** 14–37	5–6	Anaheim Stadium	53,176	Recap
12	November 26	Tampa Bay Buccaneers	**L** 13–14	5–7	Sun Devil Stadium	33,297	Recap
13	December 3	**Washington Redskins**	**L** 10–29	5–8	Sun Devil Stadium	38,870	Recap
14	December 10	at Los Angeles Raiders	**L** 14–16	5–9	Los Angeles Memorial Coliseum	41,785	Recap
15	December 16	Denver Broncos	**L** 0–37	5–10	Sun Devil Stadium	56,071	Recap
16	December 24	at **Philadelphia Eagles**	**L** 14–31	5–11	Veterans Stadium	43,287	Recap
Note: Intra-division opponents are in **bold** text.

=== Game summaries ===
==== Week 1: at Detroit Lions ====
Week 1: Phoenix Cardinals at Detroit Lions – Game summary

Quarter	1	2	3	4	Total
**Cardinals**	0	6	0	10	**16**
Lions	3	0	7	3	**13**

at Pontiac Silverdome, Pontiac, Michigan

- Date: September 10
- Game time: 1:00 p.m. EST/11:00 a.m. MST
- Game weather: None (indoor stadium)
- Game attendance: 36,735
- Box score

Game information

**First quarter**

- DET – Eddie Murray 30-yard field goal. Lions 3–0.

**Second quarter**

- PHO – Al Del Greco 29-yard field goal. Tied 3–3.
- PHO – Al Del Greco 23-yard field goal. Cardinals 6–3.

**Third quarter**

- DET – Barry Sanders 3-yard run (Eddie Murray kick). Lions 10–6.

**Fourth quarter**

- PHO – Roy Green 15-yard pass from Gary Hogeboom (Al Del Greco kick). Cardinals 13–10.
- DET – Eddie Murray 23-yard field goal. Tied 13–13.
- PHO – Al Del Greco 33-yard field goal. Cardinals 16–13.

**Top passers**

- PHO – Gary Hogeboom – 21/35, 264 yards, TD, INT
- DET – Bob Gagliano – 7/20, 116 yards

**Top rushers**

- PHO – Stump Mitchell – 18 rushes, 52 yards
- DET – Barry Sanders – 9 rushes, 71 yards, TD

**Top receivers**

- PHO – J. T. Smith – 10 receptions, 121 yards
- DET – Stacey Mobley – 2 receptions, 44 yards

==== Week 2: at Seattle Seahawks ====
Week 2: Phoenix Cardinals at Seattle Seahawks – Game summary

Quarter	1	2	3	4	Total
**Cardinals**	13	0	7	14	**34**
Seahawks	0	7	7	10	**24**

at Kingdome, Seattle, Washington

- Date: September 17
- Game time: 1:00 p.m. PST/2:00 p.m. MST
- Game weather: None (indoor stadium)
- Game attendance: 60,444
- Referee: Pat Haggerty
- TV: CBS
- Box score

Game information

**First quarter**

- PHO – Roy Green 51-yard pass from Gary Hogeboom (kick failed). Cardinals 6–0.
- PHO – Tony Jordan 1-yard run (Al Del Greco kick). Cardinals 13–0.

**Second quarter**

- SEA – Paul Skansi 3-yard pass from Dave Krieg (Norm Johnson kick). Cardinals 13–7.

**Third quarter**

- PHO – J. T. Smith 25-yard pass from Gary Hogeboom (Al Del Greco kick). Cardinals 20–7.
- SEA – Paul Skansi 17-yard pass from Dave Krieg (Norm Johnson kick). Cardinals 20–14.

**Fourth quarter**

- PHO – Roy Green 6-yard pass from Gary Hogeboom (Al Del Greco kick). Cardinals 27–14.
- SEA – Norm Johnson 39-yard field goal. Cardinals 27–17.
- PHO – Roy Green 59-yard pass from Gary Hogeboom (Al Del Greco kick). Cardinals 34–17.
- SEA – Brian Blades 5-yard pass from Dave Krieg (Norm Johnson kick). Cardinals 34–24.

**Top passers**

- PHO – Gary Hogeboom – 18/24, 298 yards, 4 TD, INT
- SEA – Dave Krieg – 25/43, 279 yards, 3 TD, INT

**Top rushers**

- PHO – Stump Mitchell – 18 rushes, 95 yards
- SEA – John Williams – 9 rushes, 36 yards

**Top receivers**

- PHO – Roy Green – 8 receptions, 166 yards, 3 TD
- SEA – Brian Blades – 9 receptions, 146 yards, TD

==== Week 3: at New York Giants ====
Week 3: Phoenix Cardinals at New York Giants – Game summary

Quarter	1	2	3	4	Total
Cardinals	0	0	0	7	**7**
**Giants**	14	6	5	10	**35**

at Giants Stadium, East Rutherford, New Jersey

- Date: September 24
- Game time: 1:00 p.m. EST/11:00 a.m. MST
- Game weather: 54 °F (12 °C)
- Game attendance: 75,742
- Box score

Game information

**First quarter**

- NYG – Stephen Baker 39-yard pass from Phil Simms (Raul Allegre kick). Giants 7–0.
- NYG – Terry Kinard 58-yard interception return (Raul Allegre kick). Giants 14–0.

**Second quarter**

- NYG – Raul Allegre 22-yard field goal. Giants 17–0.
- NYG – Raul Allegre 38-yard field goal. Giants 20–0.

**Third quarter**

- NYG – Raul Allegre 32-yard field goal. Giants 23–0.
- NYG – Team safety. Giants 25–0.

**Fourth quarter**

- NYG – Ottis Anderson 36-yard run (Raul Allegre kick). Giants 32–0.
- NYG – Raul Allegre 32-yard field goal. Giants 35–0.
- PHO – J. T. Smith 21-yard pass from Gary Hogeboom (Al Del Greco kick). Giants 35–7.

**Top passers**

- PHO – Gary Hogeboom – 19/32, 222 yards, TD, 4 INT
- NYG – Phil Simms – 11/21, 202 yards, TD

**Top rushers**

- PHO – Tony Jordan – 6 rushes, 23 yards
- NYG – Ottis Anderson – 21 rushes, 98 yards, TD

**Top receivers**

- PHO – J. T. Smith – 8 receptions, 87 yards, TD
- NYG – Lionel Manuel – 3 receptions, 69 yards

==== Week 4: vs. San Diego Chargers ====
Week 4: San Diego Chargers at Phoenix Cardinals – Game summary

Quarter	1	2	3	4	Total
**Chargers**	0	0	7	17	**24**
Cardinals	0	3	10	0	**13**

at Sun Devil Stadium, Tempe, Arizona

- Date: October 1
- Game time: 2:00 p.m. MST
- Game weather: 86 °F (30 °C)
- Game attendance: 44,201
- Box score

Game information

**First quarter**

- No scoring plays

**Second quarter**

- PHO – Al Del Greco 36-yard field goal. Cardinals 3–0.

**Third quarter**

- PHO – Al Del Greco 33-yard field goal. Cardinals 6–0.
- SD – Anthony Miller 16-yard pass from Jim McMahon (Chris Bahr kick). Chargers 7–6.
- PHO – Roy Green 59-yard pass from Gary Hogeboom (Al Del Greco kick). Cardinals 13–7.

**Fourth quarter**

- SD – Marion Butts 2-yard run (Chris Bahr kick). Chargers 14–13.
- SD – Bill Ray Smith 15-yard fumble return (Chris Bahr kick), 3:52. Chargers 21–13.
- SD – Chris Bahr 37-yard field goal. Chargers 24–21.

**Top passers**

- SD – Jim McMahon – 15/23, 188 yards, TD
- PHO – Gary Hogeboom – 22/43, 261 yards, TD, 2 INT

**Top rushers**

- SD – Marion Butts – 9 rushes, 26 yards, TD
- PHO – Earl Ferrell – 10 rushes, 38 yards

**Top receivers**

- SD – Anthony Miller – 3 receptions, 66 yards, TD
- PHO – J. T. Smith – 11 receptions, 123 yards

==== Week 5: at Washington Redskins ====
Week 5: Phoenix Cardinals at Washington Redskins – Game summary

Quarter	1	2	3	4	Total
Cardinals	0	14	7	7	**28**
**Redskins**	10	3	0	17	**30**

at Robert F. Kennedy Memorial Stadium, Washington, District of Columbia

- Date: October 8
- Game time: 4:00 p.m. EST/2:00 p.m. MST
- Game weather: 52 °F (11 °C)
- Game attendance: 53,335
- Box score

Game information

**First quarter**

- WAS – Chip Lohmiller 22-yard field goal. Redskins 3–0.
- WAS – Earnest Byner 2-yard pass from Mark Rypien (Chip Lohmiller kick). Redskins 10–0.

**Second quarter**

- WAS – Chip Lohmiller 32-yard field goal. Redskins 13–0.
- PHO – J. T. Smith 7-yard pass from Gary Hogeboom (Al Del Greco kick). Redskins 13–7.
- PHO – J. T. Smith 20-yard pass from Gary Hogeboom (Al Del Greco kick). Cardinals 14–13.

**Third quarter**

- PHO – Earl Ferrell 44-yard run (Al Del Greco kick). Cardinals 21–13.

**Fourth quarter**

- WAS – Chip Lohmiller 37-yard field goal. Cardinals 21–16.
- WAS – Art Monk 12-yard pass from Mark Rypien (Chip Lohmiller kick). Redskins 23–21.
- WAS – Gary Clark 23-yard pass from Mark Rypien (Chip Lohmiller kick). Redskins 30–21.
- PHO – J. T. Smith 17-yard pass from Gary Hogeboom (Al Del Greco kick). Redskins 30–28.

**Top passers**

- PHO – Gary Hogeboom – 20/35, 296 yards, 3 TD, 3 INT
- WAS – Mark Rypien – 23/42, 333 yards, 3 TD, INT

**Top rushers**

- PHO – Earl Ferrell – 7 rushes, 53 yards, TD
- WAS – Earnest Byner – 14 rushes, 100 yards

**Top receivers**

- PHO – J. T. Smith – 8 receptions, 114 yards, 3 TD
- WAS – Art Monk – 8 receptions, 102 yards, TD

==== Week 6: vs. Philadelphia Eagles ====
Week 6: Philadelphia Eagles at Phoenix Cardinals – Game summary

Quarter	1	2	3	4	Total
**Eagles**	0	0	14	3	**17**
Cardinals	0	5	0	0	**5**

at Sun Devil Stadium, Tempe, Arizona

- Date: October 15
- Game time: 2:00 p.m. MST
- Game weather: 80 °F (27 °C)
- Game attendance: 42,620
- Box score

Game information

**First quarter**

- No scoring plays

**Second quarter**

- PHO – Team safety. Cardinals 2–0.
- PHO – Al Del Greco 41-yard field goal. Cardinals 5–0.

**Third quarter**

- PHI – Cris Carter 2-yard pass from Randall Cunningham (Luis Zendejas kick). Eagles 7–5.
- PHI – Cris Carter 40-yard pass from Randall Cunningham (Luis Zendejas kick). Eagles 14–5.

**Fourth quarter**

- PHI – Luis Zendejas 42-yard field goal. Eagles 17–5.

**Top passers**

- PHI – Randall Cunningham – 16/29, 192 yards, 2 TD, 3 INT
- PHO – Tom Tupa – 16/41, 266 yards, 6 INT

**Top rushers**

- PHI – Randall Cunningham – 7 rushes, 70 yards
- PHO – Earl Ferrell – 13 rushes, 54 yards

**Top receivers**

- PHI – Cris Carter – 2 receptions, 42 yards, 2 TD
- PHO – Ernie Jones – 8 receptions, 144 yards

==== Week 7: vs. Atlanta Falcons ====
Week 7: Atlanta Falcons at Phoenix Cardinals – Game summary

Quarter	1	2	3	4	Total
Falcons	0	6	7	7	**20**
**Cardinals**	14	7	3	10	**34**

at Sun Devil Stadium, Tempe, Arizona

- Date: October 22
- Game time: 2:00 p.m. MST
- Game weather: 70 °F (21 °C)
- Game attendance: 33,894
- Box score

Game information

**First quarter**

- PHO – Earl Ferrell 1-yard run (Al Del Greco kick). Cardinals 7–0.
- PHO – Earl Ferrell 6-yard run (Al Del Greco kick). Cardinals 14–0.

**Second quarter**

- ATL – Paul McFadden 37-yard field goal. Cardinals 14–3.
- PHO – Ron Wolfley 5-yard run (Al Del Greco kick). Cardinals 21–3.
- ATL – Paul McFadden 37-yard field goal. Cardinals 21–6.

**Third quarter**

- PHO – Al Del Greco 50-yard field goal. Cardinals 24–6.
- ATL – Keith Jones 14-yard run (Paul McFadden kick). Cardinals 24–13.

**Fourth quarter**

- PHO – Earl Ferrell 3-yard run (Al Del Greco kick). Cardinals 31–13.
- ATL – John Settle 16-yard pass from Chris Miller (Paul McFadden kick). Cardinals 31–20.
- PHO – Al Del Greco 22-yard field goal. Cardinals 34–20.

**Top passers**

- ATL – Chris Miller – 24/44, 249 yards, TD
- PHO – Gary Hogeboom – 17/25, 181 yards, INT

**Top rushers**

- ATL – John Settle – 14 rushes, 87 yards
- PHO – Tony Jordan – 12 rushes, 49 yards

**Top receivers**

- ATL – Michael Haynes – 4 receptions, 66 yards
- PHO – J. T. Smith – 7 receptions, 96 yards

==== Week 8: at Dallas Cowboys ====
Week 8: Phoenix Cardinals at Dallas Cowboys – Game summary

Quarter	1	2	3	4	Total
**Cardinals**	6	0	7	6	**19**
Cowboys	0	3	0	7	**10**

at Texas Stadium, Irving, Texas

- Date: October 29
- Game time: 12:00 p.m. CST/11:00 a.m. MST
- Game weather: 71 °F (22 °C)
- Game attendance: 44,431
- Box score

Game information

**First quarter**

- PHO – Al Del Greco 40-yard field goal. Cardinals 3–0.
- PHO – Al Del Greco 25-yard field goal. Cardinals 6–0.

**Second quarter**

- DAL – Roger Ruzek 37-yard field goal. Cardinals 6–3.

**Third quarter**

- PHO – Mike Zordich 16-yard interception return (Al Del Greco kick). Cardinals 13–3.

**Fourth quarter**

- PHO – Al Del Greco 31-yard field goal. Cardinals 16–3.
- DAL – Derrick Shepard 37-yard pass from Steve Walsh (Roger Ruzek kick). Cardinals 16–10.
- PHO – Al Del Greco 42-yard field goal. Cardinals 19–10.

**Top passers**

- PHO – Gary Hogeboom – 17/31, 164 yards
- DAL – Steve Walsh – 21/49, 264 yards, TD, 2 INT

**Top rushers**

- PHO – Earl Ferrell – 18 rushes, 71 yards
- DAL – Paul Palmer – 15 rushes, 45 yards

**Top receivers**

- PHO – J. T. Smith – 6 receptions, 60 yards
- DAL – Derrick Shepard – 4 receptions, 92 yards, TD

==== Week 9: vs. New York Giants ====
Week 9: New York Giants at Phoenix Cardinals – Game summary

Quarter	1	2	3	4	Total
**Giants**	7	7	6	0	**20**
Cardinals	3	0	7	3	**13**

at Sun Devil Stadium, Tempe, Arizona

- Date: November 5
- Game time: 2:00 p.m. MST
- Game weather: 67 °F (19 °C)
- Game attendance: 46,588
- Box score

Game information

**First quarter**

- NYG – Jeff Hostetler 19-yard run (Raul Allegre kick). Giants 7–0.
- PHO – Al Del Greco 37-yard field goal. Giants 7–3.

**Second quarter**

- NYG – Stephen Baker 35-yard pass from Jeff Hostetler (Raul Allegre kick). Giants 14–3.

**Third quarter**

- PHO – Gary Hogeboom 5-yard run (Al Del Greco kick). Giants 14–6.

**Fourth quarter**

- NYG – Jeff Hostetler 3-yard run (kick failed). Giants 20–6.
- PHO – Al Del Greco 46-yard field goal. Giants 20–9.

**Top passers**

- NYG – Jeff Hostetler – 12/24, 177 yards, TD, 2 INT
- PHO – Gary Hogeboom – 13/31, 157 yards, INT

**Top rushers**

- NYG – Ottis Anderson – 27 rushes, 89 yards
- PHO – Vai Sikahema – 8 rushes, 42 yards

**Top receivers**

- NYG – Odessa Turner – 5 receptions, 45 yards
- PHO – Ernie Jones – 3 receptions, 42 yards

==== Week 10: vs. Dallas Cowboys ====
Week 10: Dallas Cowboys at Phoenix Cardinals – Game summary

Quarter	1	2	3	4	Total
Cowboys	3	10	0	7	**20**
**Cardinals**	0	7	0	17	**24**

at Sun Devil Stadium, Tempe, Arizona

- Date: November 12
- Game time: 2:00 p.m. MST
- Game weather: 70 °F (21 °C)
- Game attendance: 49,657
- Box score

Game information

**First quarter**

- DAL – Luis Zendejas 32-yard field goal. Cowboys 3–0.

**Second quarter**

- DAL – Luis Zendejas 29-yard field goal. Cowboys 6–0.
- PHO – Tim McDonald 53-yard interception return (Al Del Greco kick). Cardinals 7–6.
- DAL – Kelvin Martin 5-yard pass from Troy Aikman (Luis Zendejas kick). Cowboys 13-7

**Third quarter**

- No scoring plays

**Fourth quarter**

- PHO – Al Del Greco 45-yard field goal. Cowboys 13–10.
- PHO – Ernie Jones 38-yard pass from Tom Tupa (Al Del Greco kick). Cardinals 17-13
- DAL – James Dixon 75-yard pass from Troy Aikman (Luis Zendejas kick). Cowboys 20-17
- PHO – Ernie Jones 72-yard pass from Tom Tupa (Al Del Greco kick). Cardinals 24-20

**Top passers**

- DAL – Troy Aikman – 21/40, 379 yards, 2 TD, 2 INT
- PHO – Tom Tupa – 14/22, 245 yards, 2 TD

**Top rushers**

- DAL – Paul Palmer – 22 rushes, 66 yards
- PHO – Earl Ferrell – 13 rushes, 44 yards

**Top receivers**

- DAL – James Dixon – 6 receptions, 203 yards, TD
- PHO – Ernie Jones – 3 receptions, 139 yards, 2 TD

==== Week 11: at Los Angeles Rams ====
Week 11: Phoenix Cardinals at Los Angeles Rams – Game summary

Quarter	1	2	3	4	Total
Cardinals	0	0	7	7	**14**
**Rams**	14	10	3	10	**37**

at Anaheim Stadium, Anaheim, California

- Date: November 19
- Game time: 1:00 p.m. PST/2:00 p.m. MST
- Game weather: 72 °F (22 °C)
- Game attendance: 53,176
- Box score

Game information

**First quarter**

- LA – Michael Stewart 41-yard interception return (Mike Lansford kick). Rams 7–0.
- LA – Henry Ellard 49-yard pass from Jim Everett (Mike Lansford kick). Rams 14–0.

**Second quarter**

- LA – Robert Delpino 32-yard run (Mike Lansford kick). Rams 21–0.
- LA – Mike Lansford 27-yard field goal. Rams 24–0.

**Third quarter**

- LA – Mike Lansford 23-yard field goal. Rams 27–0.
- PHO – Don Holmes 77-yard pass from Tom Tupa (Al Del Greco kick). Rams 27–7.

**Fourth quarter**

- LA – Mike Lansford 40-yard field goal. Rams 30–7.
- LA – Henry Ellard 42-yard pass from Jim Everett (Mike Lansford kick). Rams 37–7.
- PHO – Tony Jordan 1-yard run (Al Del Greco kick). Rams 37–14.

**Top passers**

- PHO – Tom Tupa – 7/12, 114 yards, TD, INT
- LA – Jim Everett – 15/24, 308 yards, 2 TD

**Top rushers**

- PHO – Tony Jordan – 7 rushes, 18 yards, TD
- LA – Robert Delpino – 11 rushes, 68 yards, TD

**Top receivers**

- PHO – Don Holmes – 1 reception, 77 yards, TD
- LA – Henry Ellard – 5 receptions, 163 yards, 2 TD

==== Week 12: vs. Tampa Bay Buccaneers ====
Week 12: Tampa Bay Buccaneers at Phoenix Cardinals – Game summary

Quarter	1	2	3	4	Total
**Buccaneers**	0	7	0	7	**14**
Cardinals	0	10	3	0	**13**

at Sun Devil Stadium, Tempe, Arizona

- Date: November 26
- Game time: 2:00 p.m. MST
- Game weather: 63 °F (17 °C)
- Game attendance: 33,297
- Box score

Game information

**First quarter**

- No scoring plays

**Second quarter**

- TB – Bruce Hill 5-yard pass from Vinny Testaverde (Donald Igwebuike kick). Buccaneers 7–0.
- PHO – Earl Ferrell 1-yard run (Al Del Greco kick). Tied 7–7.
- PHO – Al Del Greco 21-yard field goal. Cardinals 10–7.

**Third quarter**

- PHO – Al Del Greco 28-yard field goal. Cardinals 13–7.

**Fourth quarter**

- TB – Mark Carrier 5-yard pass from Vinny Testaverde (Donald Igwebuike kick). Buccaneers 14-13

**Top passers**

- TB – Vinny Testaverde – 19/42, 200 yards, 2 TD, INT
- PHO – Tom Tupa – 17/38, 207 yards

**Top rushers**

- TB – William Howard – 21 rushes, 83 yards
- PHO – Tom Tupa – 3 rushes, 22 yards

**Top receivers**

- TB – Mark Carrier – 8 receptions, 90 yards, TD
- PHO – Ernie Jones – 4 receptions, 65 yards

==== Week 13: vs. Washington Redskins ====
Week 13: Washington Redskins at Phoenix Cardinals – Game summary

Quarter	1	2	3	4	Total
**Redskins**	3	7	14	5	**29**
Cardinals	0	10	0	0	**10**

at Sun Devil Stadium, Tempe, Arizona

- Date: December 3
- Game time: 2:00 p.m. MST
- Game weather: 63 °F (17 °C)
- Game attendance: 38,870
- Box score

Game information

**First quarter**

- WAS – Chip Lohmiller 29-yard field goal. Redskins 3–0.

**Second quarter**

- WAS – Earnest Byner 1-yard run (Chip Lohmiller kick). Redskins 10–0.
- PHO – Al Del Greco 27-yard field goal. Redskins 10–3.
- PHO – Earl Ferrell 1-yard run (Al Del Greco kick). Tied 10–10.

**Third quarter**

- WAS – Gerald Riggs 1-yard run (Chip Lohmiller kick). Redskins 17–10.
- WAS – A.J. Johnson 59-yard interception return (Chip Lohmiller kick). Redskins 24-10

**Fourth quarter**

- WAS – Chip Lohmiller 24-yard field goal. Redskins 27–10.
- WAS – Team safety. Redskins 29–10.

**Top passers**

- WAS – Mark Rypien – 16/22, 153 yards
- PHO – Gary Hogeboom – 8/11, 131 yards, INT

**Top rushers**

- WAS – Earnest Byner – 20 rushes, 86 yards, TD
- PHO – Earl Ferrell – 8 rushes, 14 yards, TD

**Top receivers**

- WAS – Earnest Byner – 4 receptions, 54 yards
- PHO – Roy Green – 8 receptions, 116 yards

==== Week 14: at Los Angeles Raiders ====
Week 14: Phoenix Cardinals at Los Angeles Raiderss – Game summary

Quarter	1	2	3	4	Total
Cardinals	0	7	0	7	**14**
**Raiders**	0	6	3	7	**16**

at Los Angeles Memorial Coliseum, Los Angeles, California

- Date: November 19
- Game time: 1:00 p.m. PST/2:00 p.m. MST
- Game weather: 57 °F (14 °C)
- Game attendance: 41,785
- Box score

Game information

**First quarter**

- No scoring plays

**Second quarter**

- LA – Jeff Jaeger 25-yard field goal. Raiders 3–0.
- PHO – Ernie Jones 35-yard pass from Gary Hogeboom (Al Del Greco kick). Cardinals 7–3.
- LA – Jeff Jaeger 30-yard field goal. Cardinals 7–6.

**Third quarter**

- LA – Jeff Jaeger 48-yard field goal. Raiders 9–7.

**Fourth quarter**

- PHO – Jay Novacek 2-yard pass from Gary Hogeboom (Al Del Greco kick). Cardinals 14–9.
- LA – Marcus Allen 1-yard run (Jeff Jaeger kick). Raiders 16–14.

**Top passers**

- PHO – Gary Hogeboom – 12/24, 160 yards, 2 TD
- LA – Steve Beuerlein – 13/30, 255 yards

**Top rushers**

- PHO – Earl Ferrell – 15 rushes, 57 yards
- LA – Bo Jackson – 22 rushes, 114 yards

**Top receivers**

- PHO – Ernie Jones – 4 receptions, 97 yards, TD
- LA – Mervyn Fernandez – 5 receptions, 119 yards

==== Week 15: vs. Denver Broncos ====
Week 15: Denver Broncos at Phoenix Cardinals – Game summary

Quarter	1	2	3	4	Total
**Broncos**	7	13	14	3	**37**
Cardinals	0	0	0	0	**0**

at Sun Devil Stadium, Tempe, Arizona

- Date: December 16
- Game time: 2:00 p.m. MST
- Game weather: 53 °F (12 °C)
- Game attendance: 56,071
- Referee: Dale Hamer
- TV announcers (NBC): Marv Albert and Bob Trumpy
- Box score

Game information

**First quarter**

- DEN – Karl Mecklenburg 23-yard fumble return (David Treadwell kick). Broncos 7–0.

**Second quarter**

- DEN – David Treadwell 38-yard field goal. Broncos 10–0.
- DEN – Steve Sewell 14-yard pass from John Elway (David Treadwell kick). Broncos 17–0.
- DEN – David Treadwell 33-yard field goal. Broncos 20–0.

**Third quarter**

- DEN – Mel Bratton 17-yard pass from Bobby Humphrey (David Treadwell kick). Broncos 27–0.
- DEN – Clarence Kay 20-yard pass from John Elway (David Treadwell kick). Broncos 34–0.

**Fourth quarter**

- DEN – David Treadwell 35-yard field goal. Broncos 37–0.

**Top passers**

- DEN – John Elway – 20/29, 247 yards, 2 TD, 2 INT
- PHO – Gary Hogeboom – 12/22, 106 yards, INT

**Top rushers**

- DEN – Bobby Humphrey – 23 rushes, 128 yards
- PHO – Earl Ferrell – 3 rushes, 9 yards

**Top receivers**

- DEN – Clarence Kay – 4 receptions, 64 yards, TD
- PHO – Roy Green – 3 receptions, 38 yards

==== Week 16: at Philadelphia Eagles ====
Week 16: Phoenix Cardinals at Philadelphia Eagles – Game summary

Quarter	1	2	3	4	Total
Cardinals	7	7	0	0	**14**
**Eagles**	7	14	3	7	**31**

at Veterans Stadium, Philadelphia, Pennsylvania

- Date: December 24
- Game time: 1:00 p.m. EST/11:00 a.m. MST
- Game weather: 14 °F (−10 °C)
- Game attendance: 43,287
- Box score

Game information

**First quarter**

- PHO – Roy Green 6-yard pass from Gary Hogeboom (Al Del Greco kick). Cardinals 7–0.
- PHI – Randall Cunningham 14-yard run (Roger Ruzek kick). Tied 7–7.

**Second quarter**

- PHI – Cris Carter 22-yard pass from Roger Ruzek (Roger Ruzek kick). Eagles 14–7.
- PHI – Robert Drummond 22-yard pass from Randall Cunningham (Roger Ruzek kick). Eagles 21–7.
- PHO – Roy Green 36-yard pass from Gary Hogeboom (Al Del Greco kick). Eagles 21–14.

**Third quarter**

- PHI – Roger Ruzek 39-yard field goal. Eagles 24–14.

**Fourth quarter**

- PHI – Heath Sherman 7-yard run (Roger Ruzek kick). Eagles 31–14.

**Top passers**

- PHO – Gary Hogeboom – 12/28, 212 yards, 2 TD, 2 INT
- PHI – Randall Cunningham – 19/36, 162 yards, TD, INT

**Top rushers**

- PHO – Earl Ferrell – 16 rushes, 55 yards
- PHI – Anthony Toney – 17 rushes, 82 yards

**Top receivers**

- PHO – Ernie Jones – 5 receptions, 76 yards
- PHI – Cris Carter – 3 receptions, 51 yards, TD

=== Standings ===
NFC East
	W	L	T	PCT	DIV	CONF	PF	PA	STK
^{(2)} New York Giants	12	4	0	.750	6–2	8–4	348	252	W3
^{(4)} Philadelphia Eagles	11	5	0	.688	7–1	8–4	342	274	W1
Washington Redskins	10	6	0	.625	4–4	8–4	386	308	W5
Phoenix Cardinals	5	11	0	.313	2–6	4–8	258	377	L6
Dallas Cowboys	1	15	0	.063	1–7	1–13	204	393	L7

== Records ==
- Rich Camarillo, NFL Punting Leader
