= Larry Yaji =

American baseball player

- Infielder
- Born: May 10, 1926; Honolulu, Hawaii
- Died: December 30, 2013 (aged 87); Wahiawa, Hawaii
- Batted: Right Threw: Right

debut
- 1952, for the Nishitetsu Lions

Last appearance
- 1952, for the Nishitetsu Lions

Career statistics
- Batting average: .224
- Home runs: 1
- RBI: 12

Teams
- Nishitetsu Lions (1952)

Larry Tsutomu Yaji (May 10, 1926 – December 30, 2013) was a professional baseball infielder who played for the Nishitetsu Lions in the Japanese Pacific League in 1952. He batted .224 with a .302 on-base percentage, .304 slugging percentage and 28 hits in 55 games.

He was born on Honolulu, Hawaii and died at the age of 87 in Wahiawa, Hawaii. He attended Farrington High School.
