= Farrington High School =

Governor Wallace R. Farrington High School

Location
- 1564 North King Street; Honolulu, Hawaii 96817; United States

Information
- Type: Public
- Motto: "Enter to learn, go forth to serve"
- Established: 1936
- School district: Honolulu District
- Principal: Alfredo Carganilla
- Teaching staff: 136.00 (FTE)
- Grades: 9–12
- Gender: Co-educational
- Enrolment: 2,072 (2023-2024)
- Student to teacher ratio: 15.24
- Campus type: Urban
- Colors: Maroon and White
- Athletics: Oahu Interscholastic Association
- Mascot: Governor
- Accreditation: Western Association of Schools and Colleges
- Newspaper: The Governor
- Yearbook: Ke Kia'aina
- Military: United States Army JROTC
- Website: farringtonhighschool.org

Governor Wallace Rider Farrington High School is a public secondary school (grades 9–12) located in the Kalihi district of Honolulu on the island of Oahu, Hawaii. The school is part of the Farrington-Kaiser-Kalani Complex Area of the Honolulu District of the Hawaii State Department of Education, and is named after the late Wallace Rider Farrington, the sixth governor of the Territory of Hawaii, who served from 1921 to 1929. The school's team name is the Governors.

Farrington provides career pathways for its students through several integrated vocational programs, which are provided through career academies. This includes a Health academy, a Business academy, and a Creative Arts & Technology academy that were nationally recognized for excellence.

== Academics ==
The school utilizes a wall-to-wall career academy structure. Each academy has Career and Technical education pathways. The school offers six academies, with five of them being certified by the National Academy Career Coalition. Four of the six academies are recognized as a model academies; these are the Creative Arts and Technology, Engineering, Health, and Public Service.

The Business academy along with the previous four are also certified by the NACC.

Ke Ala Pono is Farrington's equivalent to Special education to ensure equitable opportunity for college and career readiness.

Dual credit options include Advanced Placement and Early College, which is offered through the University of Hawaiʻi system.

== History ==
In September 1936, Farrington High School started operations in temporary buildings across the street of its current location which completed construction at 1939. It was part of an expansion of a larger expansion of the school system.

== Campus ==
Farrington High School was designed by noted Hawaiʻi architect Charles William Dickey. The 26 acre (100,000 m^{2}) campus, which is located at 1564 North King Street, Honolulu, is bounded on the north by Interstate H-1, on the west by Kalihi Street, and on the east by Houghtailing Street. The surrounding neighborhood consists of a mix of residential, commercial, and industrial properties. The campus boasts the sculpture The Seed by renowned Hawaiian artist Satoru Abe.

The school has undergone many renovations within the 2010s. In 2012, the school started phase one of a major renovation project, which would result in the overhaul and renovation of older buildings. This project resulted in the addition of new buildings, which were created for Smaller Learning Communities. Subsequent phases were not completed.

In November 2012, the school auditorium roof collapsed due to heavy rain. A technician doing a sound check in the auditorium was safe from harm due to his location in the stage. The roof collapse resulted in a renovation project, which was finished in 2016. This resulted in the addition of classroom spaces and other various improvements.

In 2017, an overhaul was completed on the school's track and field facility. This included the resurfacing of the track to a become a synthetic turf field, a locker room, and the addition of a press box to the bleachers area.

In 2025, following the completion of the Edward “Skippa” Diaz Stadium named after Farrington football coach in 2017. $60 million are raised to replace the area of the swimming pool with a three-story building for new gym and locker rooms. Completion of the project is expected at 2027.

== Extracurricular activities ==
=== Athletics ===
Farrington's athletic teams, the Governors, compete in the Oahu Interscholastic Association (OIA) and the Hawaii High School Athletic Association (HHSAA); They are former members of the Interscholastic League of Honolulu (ILH).

The school fields teams in 15 sports: baseball (boys), basketball, bowling, canoe paddling, cheerleading (girls), cross country, flag football (girls), football (boys), golf, judo, soccer, softball (girls), tennis, track and field, volleyball, and wrestling.

- The boys teams have won state championships in baseball, basketball, bowling, and volleyball.
- The girls teams have won state championships in bowling, cross country, judo and wrestling.
- The girls' varsity wrestling team has won state championships in 2004 and 2006.

== Notable achievements ==
Farrington High School was honored as a 2017 Model School by the International Center for Leadership in Education.

== Notable alumni ==
Listed alphabetically by last name (year of graduation):

- Simeon R. Acoba, Jr. (1962) – associate justice, Hawaii State Supreme Court (2000–2014)
- Bob Apisa (1963) – college football All-American Michigan State University
- Dennis Arakaki – Hawaii state representative (1985–2006)
- Benjamin J. Cayetano (1958) – Governor of Hawaii (1994–2002); first Filipino-American governor in the U.S.
- Elias Camsek Chin - former vice president of Palau
- Agnes Kalaniho'okaha Cope - Hawaiian culture preservationist
- Nuu Faaola (1982) – National Football League player, New York Jets and Miami Dolphins (1986–89)
- Mario Fatafehi (1999) – NFL player, Denver Broncos (2003–04)
- Ta'ase Faumui – football player, Pittsburgh Steelers (1994–95)
- Breiden Fehoko - professional football player
- Takeshi Fuji - professional boxer
- Nephi Hannemann (1962) - actor
- Taylor Ibera - judoka and wrestler
- Dick Jensen – entertainer, Christian evangelist
- Lew Kamanu - NFL player
- Pat Kesi (1992) - former NFL lineman
- Michelle Kidani (1966) – Hawaii state senator (2009–present); State Senate Vice President (2016–present)
- Donna Mercado Kim - member of the Hawaii Senate
- Iapani Laloulu (2023) – center for the Oregon Ducks (2023–present)
- Shawn Lauvao – offensive lineman for NFL's Washington Redskins
- Vince Manuwai (1999) – NFL player, Jacksonville Jaguars (2003–10)
- John Matias – MLB player, Chicago White Sox
- Donna Mercado Kim – Hawaii state senator (2000–present); former state senate president (2012–2015)
- Chad Mock - professional football player
- Janet Mock (2001) – writer, TV host, and author of New York Times bestseller Redefining Realness
- Beverly Noa - hula dancer
- Al Noga (1983) – former NFL player
- Pete Noga (1982?) – former NFL replacement player
- Niko Noga (1979) – former NFL player
- Jesse Sapolu (1979) – NFL player, San Francisco 49ers, 4-time Super Bowl champion
- Augie T. (1986) – entertainer, comedian, Honolulu City Council District 9 Councilmember
- James H. Wakatsuki - justice of the Supreme Court of Hawaii
- Josh White (1995) – football player, Arena Football League
- Taylor Wily (1986) - combat sports athlete and actor
- Beauleen Carl-Worswick (1980) – Micronesian judge
- Larry Yaji - professional baseball player
- Wally Kaname Yonamine (1945) – NFL player, San Francisco 49ers (1947); Nippon Professional Baseball (Japan), Yomiuri Giants, Chunichi Dragons; Japanese Baseball Hall of Fame (1994); founder/owner, Wally Yonamine Pearls – Roppongi, Tokyo, Japan; philanthropist – Wally Yonamine Foundation; Governors Hall of Fame (2007 inductee)

== Demographics ==
There were 2,094 students as of the 2024-2025 school year, with the following racial composition:

- Asian: 53.0%
- Native Hawaiian / Pacific Islander: 33.9%
- Hispanic: 5.4%
- White, non-Hispanic: 0.3%
- Two or More Races: 7.4%

As of 2017, the school has over 60% free and reduced lunch students, 10% Special Education students, and 11% English Language Learners.
