= Al Noga =

American football player (born 1965)

No. 99, 72
- Positions: Defensive end, defensive tackle

Personal information
- Born: September 16, 1965 (age 61); Fagasa, American Samoa
- Listed height: 6 ft 1 in (1.85 m)
- Listed weight: 259 lb (117 kg)

Career information
- High school: Farrington (Honolulu, Hawaii, U.S.)
- College: Hawaii
- NFL draft: 1988: 3rd round, 71st overall pick

Career history
- Minnesota Vikings (1988–1992); Washington Redskins (1993); Minnesota Vikings (1994)*; Arizona Cardinals (1994)*; Indianapolis Colts (1994); San Jose SaberCats (1996–1997); Portland Forest Dragons (1999)
- * Offseason or practice squad member only

Awards and highlights
- Second-team All-Arena (1997); First-team All-American (1986); WAC Defensive Player of the Year (1986); 3× First-team All-WAC (1985-1987)

Career NFL statistics
- Sacks: 34.5
- Interceptions: 1
- Touchdowns: 1
- Stats at Pro Football Reference
- Stats at ArenaFan.com

Alapati Noga (born September 16, 1965) is an American former professional football player who was a defensive lineman for seven seasons in the National Football League (NFL).

Noga was an Outland Trophy finalist, and an AP first-team All-American at the University of Hawaii at Manoa. He was selected by the Minnesota Vikings with the 71st pick in the third round in the 1988 NFL draft. In the December 27, 1999, issue of Sports Illustrated, he was listed as number 46 on their "50 Greatest Hawaii Sports Figures" list.

Noga is married to Theresa Sagapolutele. Noga's brothers, Pete and Niko, both played at the University of Hawai'i and Niko played later in the NFL.
