= 1986 All-Southwest Conference football team =

American college football all-star team

The 1986 All-Southwest Conference football team consists of American football players chosen for All-Southwest Conference teams for the 1986 NCAA Division I-A football season. The selectors for the 1986 season included the Associated Press (AP).

== Offensive selections ==
=== Quarterbacks ===
- Kevin Murray, Texas A&M (AP-1)
- Cody Carlson, Baylor (AP-2)

=== Running backs ===
- Eric Metcalf, Texas (AP-1)
- Roger Vick, Texas A&M (AP-1)
- Keith Woodside, Texas A&M (AP-2)
- Jeff Atkins, SMU (AP-2)

=== Wide receivers ===
- James Shibest, Arkansas (AP-1)
- Ron Morris, SMU (AP-1)
- Shea Walker, Texas A&M (AP-2)
- Wayne Walker, Texas Tech (AP-2)

=== Tight ends ===
- Rod Bernstine, Texas A&M (AP-1)
- Kenny Major, Rice (AP-2)

=== Centers ===
- John Adickes, Baylor (AP-1)
- Chris Tanner, Texas Tech (AP-2)

=== Guards ===
- Fred Childress, Arkansas (AP-1)
- Paul Jetton, Texas (AP-1)
- Jeff Keith, Texas Tech (AP-2)
- Mark Bates, Baylor (AP-2)

=== Tackles ===
- Louis Cheek, Texas A&M (AP-1)
- Joel Porter, Baylor (AP-1)
- Howard Richards, SMU (AP-2)
- Craig Kennington, SMU (AP-2)

== Defensive selections ==
=== Defensive lineman ===
- Sammy O'Brient, Texas A&M (AP-1)
- Tony Cherico, Arkansas (AP-1)
- Jerry Ball, SMU (AP-1)
- Steve Grumbine, Baylor (AP-1)
- Rod Saddler, Texas A&M (AP-2)
- Jay Muller, Texas A&M (AP-2)
- Calvin Riggs, Texas Tech (AP-2)
- Dwain Turner, Rice (AP-2)

=== Linebackers ===
- Brad Hastings, Texas Tech (AP-1)
- Johnny Holland, Texas A&M (AP-1)
- Ray Berry, Baylor (AP-1)
- Rickey Williams, Arkansas (AP-2)
- Michael Johnson, Texas Tech (AP-2)
- Todd Howard, Texas A&M (AP-2)
- Gary McGuire, Houston (AP-2)

=== Secondary ===
- Kip Corrington, Texas A&M (AP-1)
- Thomas Everett, Baylor (AP-1)
- Ron Francis, Baylor (AP-1)
- Steve Atwater, Arkansas (AP-1)
- Stephen Braggs, Texas (AP-1)
- Roland Mitchell, Texas Tech (AP-2)
- Merv Scurlark, Texas Tech (AP-2)
- Chuck Washington, Arkansas (AP-2)
- James Flowers, Texas A&M (AP-2)
- Steve Kidd, Rice (AP-2)

== Special teams ==
=== Place-kickers ===
- Scott Slater, Texas A&M (AP-1)
- Jeff Ward, Texas (AP-2)

=== Punters ===
- Greg Horne, Arkansas (AP-1)
- Chris Becker, TCU (AP-2)

=== Return specialist ===
- Tyrone Thurman, Texas Tech (AP-1)

== Miscellaneous ==
- Offensive Player of the Year: Kevin Murray, Texas A&M (AP)
- Defensive Player of the Year: Thomas Everett, Baylor (AP)
- Coach of the Year: David McWilliams, Texas Tech (AP)
- Offensive Newcomer of the Year: James Gray, Texas Tech (AP)
- Defensive Newcomer of the Year: Duane Duncum, Texas (AP)

== Key ==
AP = Associated Press
