= Pat Kesi =

American football player (born 1973)

Profile
- Position: Offensive tackle

Personal information
- Born: September 10, 1973 (age 53); American Samoa
- Listed height: 6 ft 3 in (1.91 m)

Career information
- High school: Farrington (Honolulu, Hawaii, U.S.)
- College: Washington
- NFL draft: 1996: undrafted

Career history
- Oakland Raiders (1996)*; Green Bay Packers (1997); Philadelphia Eagles (1997); Winnipeg Blue Bombers (1999); Toronto Argonauts (1999); Las Vegas Outlaws
- * Offseason or practice squad member only

Pat Kesi (born September 10, 1973) is a former American football offensive linemen. He played college ball at Washington. His hometown is Las Vegas, Nevada.

== College career ==
While attending Washington, Kesi received the nickname "Calves" due to his massive 22-inch calves. As a junior and senior he started all 11 games. While a sophomore he played in all 11 games and started 3. He was part of the offensive line that paved the way for Napoleon Kaufman's record breaking 1,890-yard rushing season.

== Professional career ==
Kesi was undrafted on the 1996 NFL draft. However, that same year he was signed by the Oakland Raiders. In 1997, he was originally signed by the Dallas Cowboys where he was mentored under Mark Tuinei. Tuinei even gave Pat some free shoes due to the fact that Kesi did not have a shoe contract at the time. Green Bay Packers and was a member of the special teams making 4 tackles in 6 games. He was released by the Packers and was signed by the Philadelphia Eagles. Again he played special teams and earned the special teams player spot on Pro-Football Weekly's all-rookie team. He was released by the Eagles at the conclusion of the season. In 2000, he was the 188th pick in the XFL draft by the Las Vegas Outlaws.

== Personal life ==
He was born in American Samoa to father Sinuka and mother Flonda. He has two brothers and two sisters. He attended Farrington High School where he played for coach Edward Diaz. Besides football, he competed in track where he threw the shot put and discus. At Washington his majored in Ethnic Studies.
