= Chad Mock =

American gridiron football player (born 1984)

Profile
- Positions: Wide receiver Slotback

Personal information
- Born: March 23, 1984 (age 42); Long Beach, California, U.S.

Career information
- College: University of Hawaii

Career history
- 2007: British Columbia Lions

Chad Mock (born March 23, 1984) is a professional football player who played for the BC Lions of the Canadian Football League in 2007. He is currently a member of their practice squad. Chad played the wide receiver position with the Lions, and wore jersey number #83.

== Early life ==
Born in Long Beach, California, Mock moved with his family to Hawaii where he attended Farrington High School in Oahu. Mock graduated from Farrington in 2002 and was a three-sport letterman in football, basketball and track & field. He is the brother of activist and writer Janet Mock.

== Career ==
=== College ===
Mock played two years of college football with Avila University in Kansas City, Missouri, before transferring to the University of Hawaii in 2004. After a redshirt season in 2004, Mock played in eight games for the Warriors, recorded 42 catches for 502 yards and one touchdown in 2005. Mock caught a career-high 147 yards, including his first collegiate touchdown, against New Mexico State (and caught a career-high 11 passes (104 yards) at San Jose State. Mock finished his collegiate career with 68 catches for 880 yards in over 20 games for the Warriors.

=== Professional ===
Mock began his professional football career with the CFL British Columbia Lions, signing as a free agent in May, 2007. Originally signed to the developmental squad, Mock started three games as a wide receiver/slotback with the team.

Mock's uncle, Alvis Satele, was a defensive lineman for the Lions in 1987.

Mock was released by the Lions on May 13, 2008, prior to the start of the 2008 CFL season.
