= Roland Mitchell =

American football player (born 1964)

No. 25, 39, 47
- Position: Cornerback

Personal information
- Born: March 15, 1964 (age 62); Columbus, Texas, U.S.
- Listed height: 5 ft 11 in (1.80 m)
- Listed weight: 195 lb (88 kg)

Career information
- High school: Bay City (Texas)
- College: Texas Tech
- NFL draft: 1987: 2nd round, 33rd overall pick

Career history
- Buffalo Bills (1987–1988); Phoenix Cardinals (1988–1989); Atlanta Falcons (1990); Green Bay Packers (1991–1994)

Awards and highlights
- Second-team All-American (1986); Second-team All-SWC (1986)

Career NFL statistics
- Tackles: 190
- Interceptions: 6
- Fumble recoveries: 3
- Stats at Pro Football Reference

Roland Mitchell (born March 15, 1964) is an American former professional football player who was a cornerback for eight seasons in the National Football League (NFL).

Mitchell was born in Columbus, Texas and played scholastically at Bay City High School. He played college football for the Texas Tech Red Raiders, where, as a senior, he was honored by Gannett News Service (GNS) as a second-team All-American.

Pre-draft measurables
Height	Weight	Arm length	Hand span	40-yard dash	10-yard split	20-yard split	20-yard shuttle	Vertical jump	Broad jump	Bench press
5 ft 11 1/8 in (1.81 m)	180 lb (82 kg)	31 1/2 in (0.80 m)	9 1/2 in (0.24 m)	4.49 s	1.58 s	2.60 s	4.15 s	32.0 in (0.81 m)	10 ft 8 in (3.25 m)	9 reps
All values from NFL Combine

Mitchell was selected in the second round of the 1987 NFL draft by the Buffalo Bills. He appeared in eleven games his first year, and the first three of the next, before being traded to the Phoenix Cardinals for Leonard Smith. He spent the remainder of 1988, and then the entire 1989 season with the Cardinals.

Mitchell was with the Atlanta Falcons for the 1990 season, and then spent four years with the Green Bay Packers to finish his career. He started all 16 games in 1993 for the Packers.

Mitchell recorded six career interceptions, to go with three fumble recoveries.
