= Ilia Jarostchuk =

American football player (born 1964)

No. 50, 58
- Position: Linebacker

Personal information
- Born: August 1, 1964 (age 62); Utica, New York, U.S.
- Listed height: 6 ft 3 in (1.91 m)
- Listed weight: 231 lb (105 kg)

Career information
- High school: Whitesboro (NY) Central
- College: New Hampshire
- NFL draft: 1987: 5th round, 127th overall pick

Career history
- St. Louis Cardinals (1987); San Francisco 49ers (1988); Miami Dolphins (1988); Phoenix Cardinals (1989); New England Patriots (1990–1991); San Francisco 49ers (1992)*
- * Offseason or practice squad member only
- Stats at Pro Football Reference

Ilia Jarostchuk (born August 1, 1964) is an American former professional football linebacker who played for the St. Louis Cardinals, San Francisco 49ers, Miami Dolphins, Phoenix Cardinals, and New England Patriots. He played college football at New Hampshire.

== Early life ==
Jarostchuk was born on August 1, 1964, in Utica, New York. His parents had moved from the Soviet Union to the United States in 1958. He has three younger siblings: brothers Alex and Basil, and sister Anya.

Jarostchuk played high school football at Whitesboro Central High School, although he did not join the team until his senior year, only playing soccer before that.

== College career ==
Jarostchuk attended the University of New Hampshire, where he double majored in business administration and civil engineering. Together with his younger brothers Alex and Basil, he formed part of "The Russian Front" on the Wildcats' defensive line. His younger sister, Anya, also attended the school for one year.

During his college career, Jarostchuk made 204 tackles and 21 sacks, earning AP Division I-AA All-American honors in his junior year and making All-East Coast Athletic Conference during his senior year.

== Professional career ==
Pre-draft measurables
Height	Weight	Arm length	Hand span	40-yard dash	10-yard split	20-yard split	20-yard shuttle	Vertical jump	Broad jump
6 ft 3 1/2 in (1.92 m)	231 lb (105 kg)	30 1/2 in (0.77 m)	8 1/2 in (0.22 m)	4.77 s	1.69 s	2.71 s	4.43 s	31.0 in (0.79 m)	9 ft 8 in (2.95 m)
All values from NFL Combine

=== St. Louis Cardinals ===
The St. Louis Cardinals selected Jarostchuk in the fifth round of the 1987 NFL draft, with the 127th pick overall. He played 12 games with the Cardinals during the 1987 season, mainly appearing on special teams. The Cardinals released him on August 30, 1988.

=== San Francisco 49ers (first stint) ===
Jarostchuk signed for one game with the San Francisco 49ers in 1988. The 49ers released him on September 16, 1988.

=== Miami Dolphins ===
In 1988, Jarostchuk joined the Miami Dolphins, playing six games with the team that season. The Dolphins waived Jarostchuk on November 9, 1988, and released him the following day.

=== Phoenix Cardinals ===
As a free agent, Jarostchuk re-signed with the Cardinals, who had since relocated to Phoenix, Arizona. He played in all 16 games of the Cardinals' 1989 season, with one start at middle linebacker. That start was the team's November 26 game against the Tampa Bay Buccaneers, which the Cardinals barely lost, with a score of 14–13.

=== New England Patriots ===
On March 24, 1990, Jarostchuk signed with the New England Patriots. He played 12 games with the team, starting one game at right linebacker. However, he mainly saw action on special teams.

The Patriots had an abysmal 1–15 record in their 1990 season, and Jarostchuk did not play in any winning games that year. He started in the team's final game of the year, a December 30 matchup against the New York Giants, which the Patriots lost 13–10. The Giants later went on to win the Super Bowl.

Jarostchuk signed again with the Patriots as a free agent on September 27, 1991, and was released on August 20, 1992. He did not appear in any games in the 1991 season.

=== San Francisco 49ers (second stint) ===
Just days after being released by the Patriots, Jarostchuk was signed again by the 49ers, on August 25, 1992. He was released on September 1, 1992.
