= Kip Corrington =

American football player (born 1965)

No. 25
- Position: Safety

Personal information
- Born: April 12, 1965 (age 61); Ames, Iowa, U.S.
- Listed height: 6 ft 0 in (1.83 m)
- Listed weight: 175 lb (79 kg)

Career information
- High school: A&M Consolidated (College Station, Texas)
- College: Texas A&M
- NFL draft: 1988: 9th round, 223rd overall pick

Career history
- Detroit Lions (1988)*; Denver Broncos (1988–1990)
- * Offseason or practice squad member only

Awards and highlights
- Third-team All-American (1987); 2× First-team All-SWC (1986, 1987)

Career NFL statistics
- Interceptions: 1
- Fumble recoveries: 1
- Stats at Pro Football Reference

Kip Alan Corrington (born April 12, 1965) is an American former professional football player. After playing college football at Texas A&M University, he spent two seasons in the National Football League (NFL) with the Denver Broncos. He was selected by the Detroit Lions in the ninth round of the 1988 NFL draft with the 223rd overall pick. Corrington was a three-time Academic All-American as well as a two-time All-SWC safety in college. He is currently a family practitioner in the Greensboro, North Carolina area.
