= Vince Manuwai =

American football player (1980–2018)

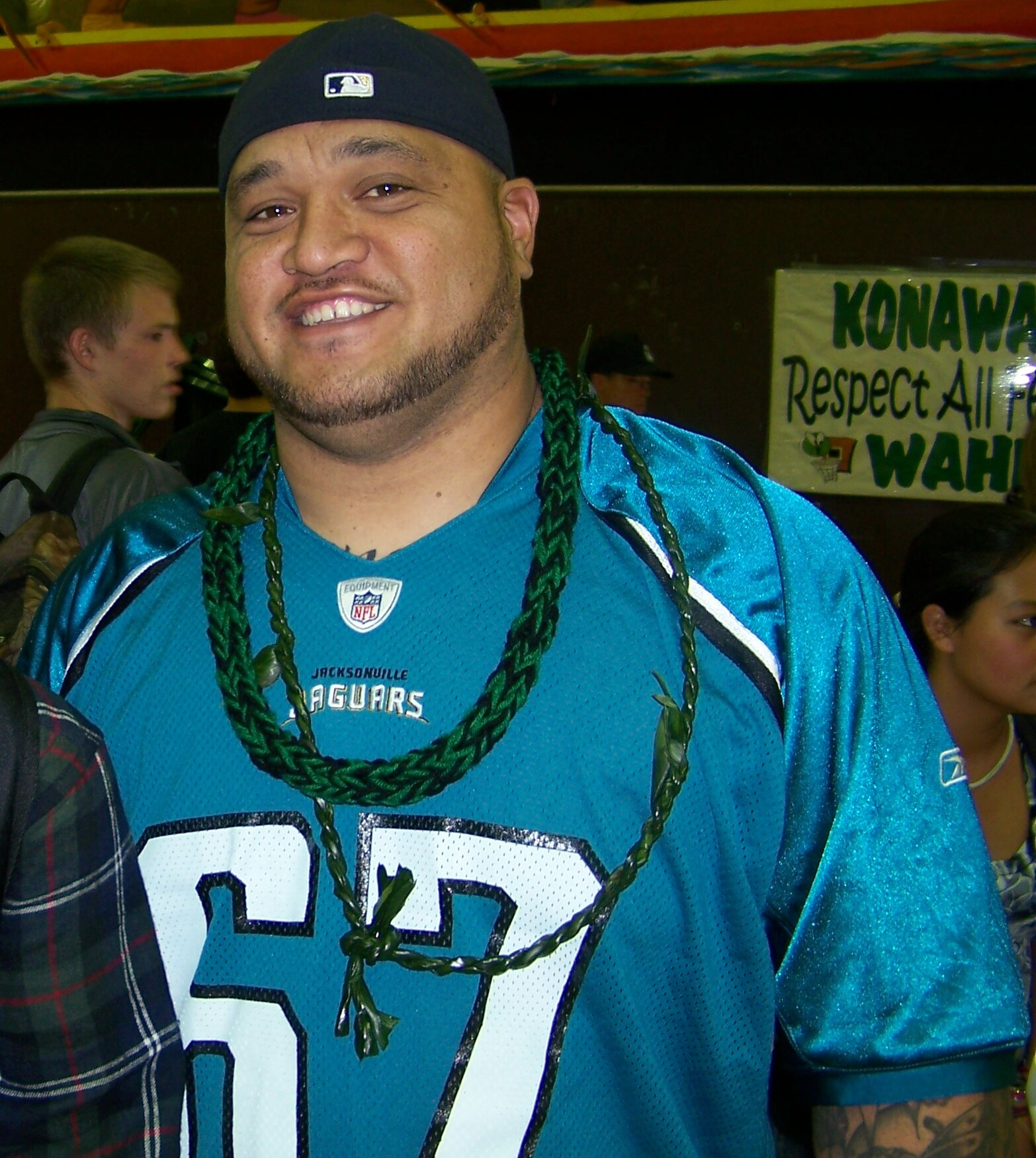

No. 67
- Position: Guard

Personal information
- Born: July 12, 1980; Honolulu, Hawaii, U.S.
- Died: November 4, 2018 (aged 38); Honolulu, Hawaii, U.S.
- Listed height: 6 ft 2 in (1.88 m)
- Listed weight: 333 lb (151 kg)

Career information
- High school: Farrington (Honolulu)
- College: Hawaii
- NFL draft: 2003: 3rd round, 72nd overall pick

Career history
- Jacksonville Jaguars (2003–2010); Atlanta Falcons (2012)*
- * Offseason or practice squad member only

Awards and highlights
- Second-team All-American (2002)

Career NFL statistics
- Games played: 111
- Games started: 105
- Stats at Pro Football Reference

Vincent Keoni Manuwai (July 12, 1980 – November 4, 2018) was an American professional football guard. He was selected in the third round of the 2003 NFL draft by the Jacksonville Jaguars. He played college football for the University of Hawaii Warriors.

== Early life ==
Manuwai was born in Honolulu, Hawaii. He attended Farrington High School in Honolulu, where he earned varsity letters three times each in football and track and field and once in basketball. In football, he earned All-Conference and All-State honors. In track and field, he was All-League in the shot put, and first team All-League and second team All-State in the discus throw. Vincent Manuwai graduated from Farrington High School in 1999.

== College career ==
Manuwai attended the University of Hawaii, where he played for the Hawaii Warriors football team. He was a three-year starter and played all positions on the line. He was regarded as one of the best pass protectors in the country. He did not allow a sack in his last 35 games as a starter with 60 knockdowns. Manuwai honors include:All-America first-team choice by College Football News as a senior, All-WAC first-team, received the Warrior Club Award (team's best player). He majored in sociology.

== Professional career ==
Pre-draft measurables
Height	Weight	Arm length	Hand span	40-yard dash	10-yard split	20-yard split	20-yard shuttle	Three-cone drill	Vertical jump	Broad jump	Bench press
6 ft 2 in (1.88 m)	304 lb (138 kg)	31 in (0.79 m)	9 5/8 in (0.24 m)	5.14 s	1.70 s	2.91 s	4.40 s	7.59 s	29 1/2 in (0.75 m)	8 ft 11 in (2.72 m)	27 reps
All values from NFL Combine.

=== Jacksonville Jaguars ===
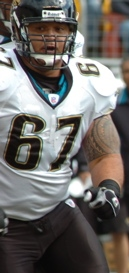
Manuwai in 2005

Manuwai was selected by the Jacksonville Jaguars in the third round (72nd pick overall) of the 2003 NFL draft.

Manuwai was one of the key factors in Jacksonville's rushing success. Through the 2007 season, Manuwai started all but one game for the Jaguars and was the most successful player on the offensive line. With Manuwai as guard, the Jaguars offense rushed for 2,541 yards in 2006 and 2,391 in 2007. In 2008, however, he suffered anterior cruciate ligament (ACL) and medial collateral ligament (MCL) injuries and was placed on injured reserve for the remainder of the season. He returned in 2009, and spent the season overcoming his injury and other obstacles. In 2010, he was replaced on the starting line by Justin Smiley. He recovered the starting spot when Smiley was injured in October and became a significant factor in the emergence of Jacksonville's formidable running game.

On July 29, 2011, Manuwai was released by Jacksonville.

=== Atlanta Falcons ===
The Atlanta Falcons signed Manuwai on March 9, 2012. He was released on July 28, 2012.

== Death ==
Manuwai died on November 4, 2018, at the age of 38, after reportedly collapsing while moving into an apartment in Honolulu, Hawaii. The cause of death was an ecstasy intoxication.
