= Todd Howard (American football) =

American gridiron football player and coach (born 1965)

No. 53
- Position: Linebacker

Personal information
- Born: February 18, 1965 (age 61); Bryan, Texas, U.S.
- Listed height: 6 ft 2 in (1.88 m)
- Listed weight: 235 lb (107 kg)

Career information
- High school: Bryan
- College: Texas A&M
- NFL draft: 1987: 3rd round, 73rd overall pick

Career history

Playing
- Kansas City Chiefs (1987–1988); Green Bay Packers (1989)*; Los Angeles Rams (1990)*; Barcelona Dragons (1991–1992)
- * Offseason or practice squad member only

Coaching
- Texas A&M (1991–1993) Assistant coach; Grinnell College (1994–1995) Assistant coach; Grinnell College (1996–1997) Defensive coordinator; St. Louis Rams (1998–1999) Defensive assistant; Louisiana Tech (2000–2002) Linebackers coach; Jacksonville Jaguars (2003–2004) Defensive assistant; Jacksonville Jaguars (2005) Assistant defensive line coach; UCLA (2006–2010) Defensive line coach; Washington State (2011) Defensive line coach; California (2012) Defensive line coach; Saskatchewan Roughriders (2013–2014) Defensive line coach; Winnipeg Blue Bombers (2015–2017) Defensive line coach; Montreal Alouettes (2018) Linebackers coach; Montreal Alouettes (2019–2021) Defensive line coach

Awards and highlights
- As coach: Super Bowl champion (XXXIV); Grey Cup champion (2013); Second-team All-SWC (1986)

Career NFL statistics
- Games played: 19
- Fumble recoveries: 1
- Stats at Pro Football Reference

Walter Lee Howard (born February 18, 1965) is an American former professional football player and coach. He played as a linebacker for the Kansas City Chiefs of the National Football League (NFL). Howard played college football for the Texas A&M Aggies before being selected by the Chiefs in the third round of the 1987 NFL draft. After his playing career, he became a coach, finishing his career with the Montreal Alouettes of the Canadian Football League (NFL).

== Playing career ==
Pre-draft measurables
Height	Weight	Arm length	Hand span	40-yard dash	10-yard split	20-yard split	20-yard shuttle	Vertical jump	Broad jump	Bench press
6 ft 2 7/8 in (1.90 m)	237 lb (108 kg)	32 1/2 in (0.83 m)	9 1/2 in (0.24 m)	4.80 s	1.67 s	2.75 s	4.50 s	28.0 in (0.71 m)	9 ft 0 in (2.74 m)	17 reps
All values from NFL Combine

Howard was an all-conference linebacker at Texas A&M before being drafted by the Kansas City Chiefs in the third round of the 1987 NFL draft. Howard spent two seasons with the Chiefs and a season with the Barcelona Dragons of the World League of American Football before going into coaching.

== Coaching career ==
Howard began his coaching career at his alma mater Texas A&M, where he was a member of a coaching staff that won three consecutive Southwest Conference championships. He went on to coach at Grinnell College in Iowa, working his way up to defensive coordinator in 1996. Howard left Grinnell to join the coaching staff of the St. Louis Rams as a defensive assistant in 1998. He won his first career Super Bowl with the team when they won Super Bowl XXXIV over the Tennessee Titans in 1999.

After a stint at Louisiana Tech as their linebackers coach, Howard joined the coaching staff at Southwest Texas State as their associate head coach and co-defensive coordinator before leaving to join Jack Del Rio's inaugural coaching staff of the Jacksonville Jaguars in 2003.

Howard joined the coaching staff at UCLA in 2006 as their defensive line coach, eventually being promoted to associate head coach of the defense. After one season at Washington State, Howard spent 2012 at California as their defensive line coach.

Howard joined the Saskatchewan Roughriders in 2013 as their defensive line coach. He won his first career Grey Cup with the team when they defeated the Hamilton Tiger-Cats in the 101st Grey Cup. He was named the defensive line coach of the Winnipeg Blue Bombers in 2015, spending three seasons with the team.

Howard was named the linebackers coach of the Montreal Alouettes in 2018. He was reassigned to defensive line for the 2019 season. He was relieved of his coaching duties on September 26, 2021.
