= Ta'ase Faumui =

American football player (born 1971)

No. 78, 91
- Position: Defensive end

Personal information
- Born: March 19, 1971 (age 55); Western Samoa
- Listed height: 6 ft 3 in (1.91 m)
- Listed weight: 278 lb (126 kg)

Career information
- High school: Farrington (Honolulu, Hawaii, U.S.)
- College: Hawaii (1990–1993)
- NFL draft: 1994: 4th round, 122nd overall pick

Career history
- Pittsburgh Steelers (1994–1995); Oakland Raiders (1997–1998); → Amsterdam Admirals (1998)

Career NFL statistics
- Tackles: 2
- Stats at Pro Football Reference

Ta'ase Faumui (born March 19, 1971) is a Samoan former professional American football defensive end who played two seasons with the Pittsburgh Steelers of the National Football League (NFL). He was selected by the Steelers in the fourth round of the 1994 NFL draft after playing college football at the University of Hawaii at Manoa. He also played for the Amsterdam Admirals of NFL Europe.

== Early life and college ==
Ta'ase Faumui was born on March 19, 1971, in Western Samoa. He attended Farrington High School in Honolulu, Hawaii.

Faumui was a member of the Hawaii Rainbow Warriors of the University of Hawaii at Manoa from 1990 to 1993 and a three-year letterman from 1991 to 1993.

== Professional career ==
Faumui was selected by the Pittsburgh Steelers in the fourth round, with the 122nd overall pick, of the 1994 NFL draft. He officially signed with the team on July 13. He played in five games for the Steelers during the 1994 season, posting two solo tackles. Faumui appeared in three games in 1995. He was released by the Steelers on August 19, 1996.

Faumui signed with the Oakland Raiders on March 5, 1997. He was released on August 19 but later re-signed on December 17, 1997. He did not play in any games for the Raiders during the 1997 season. In 1998, Faumui was allocated to NFL Europe to play for the Amsterdam Admirals. He recorded seven tackles, one sack, one forced fumble, one pass breakup, and one blocked kick for the Admirals during the 1998 NFL Europe season. He was released by the Raiders on August 25, 1998. He was signed to the team's practice squad on November 24, 1998, and later became a free agent after the season.

== Personal life ==
Faumui's nephew Junior Ta'ase also played college football for the Hawaii Rainbow Warriors.
