= Mark Jackson (defensive back) =

American football player (born 1962)

No. 5, 21
- Position: Cornerback

Personal information
- Born: March 16, 1962 (age 64); Amarillo, Texas, U.S.
- Listed height: 5 ft 9 in (1.75 m)
- Listed weight: 180 lb (82 kg)

Career information
- High school: Tascosa (Amarillo)
- College: Abilene Christian
- NFL draft: 1984: undrafted

Career history
- Buffalo Bills (1984)*; Edmonton Eskimos (1985–1986); St. Louis Cardinals (1987); Dallas Texans (1990–1992)
- * Offseason or practice squad member only

Career NFL statistics
- Fumble recoveries: 1
- Touchdowns: 1
- Stats at Pro Football Reference

Mark Devalon Jackson (born March 16, 1962) is an American former professional football player who was a cornerback for the St. Louis Cardinals of the National Football League (NFL). He played college football for the Abilene Christian Wildcats.
