= Mark Garalczyk =

American football player (born 1964)

No. 76, 74
- Positions: Defensive tackle, defensive end

Personal information
- Born: August 12, 1964 (age 62); Roseville, Michigan, U.S.
- Listed height: 6 ft 5 in (1.96 m)
- Listed weight: 272 lb (123 kg)

Career information
- High school: Fraser (Fraser, Michigan)
- College: Western Michigan
- NFL draft: 1987: 4Bth round, 146th overall pick

Career history
- St. Louis/Phoenix Cardinals (1987–1988); New York Jets (1988); Houston Oilers (1989); Indianapolis Colts (1991)

Career NFL statistics
- Sacks: 3
- Fumble recoveries: 1
- Stats at Pro Football Reference

Mark Garalczyk (born August 12, 1964) is an American former professional football player who was a defensive tackle and defensive end in the National Football League (NFL). He played for the St. Louis Cardinals in 1987 and for the Phoenix Cardinals and New York Jets in 1988. He was selected by the Cardinals in the sixth round of the 1987 NFL draft after playing college football for the Western Michigan Broncos.

Pre-draft measurables
Height	Weight	Arm length	Hand span	40-yard dash	10-yard split	20-yard split	20-yard shuttle	Vertical jump	Broad jump	Bench press
6 ft 4 7/8 in (1.95 m)	272 lb (123 kg)	31 3/4 in (0.81 m)	10 3/4 in (0.27 m)	5.01 s	1.72 s	2.90 s	4.56 s	28.0 in (0.71 m)	8 ft 10 in (2.69 m)	14 reps
All values from NFL Combine
