= Pete Noga =

American Samoan gridiron football player (born 1964)

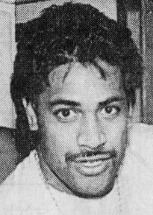
- Noga in 1988

No. 57
- Position: Linebacker

Personal information
- Born: June 24, 1964 (age 62); American Samoa
- Listed height: 6 ft 0 in (1.83 m)
- Listed weight: 212 lb (96 kg)

Career information
- High school: Farrington (Honolulu, Hawaii, U.S.)
- College: Hawaii
- NFL draft: 1987: undrafted

Career history
- St. Louis Cardinals (1987); Indianapolis Colts (1988)*; Ottawa Rough Riders (1989)*
- * Offseason or practice squad member only

Awards and highlights
- Second-team All-WAC (1986)
- Stats at Pro Football Reference

Petelo "Pete" Noga (born June 24, 1964) is an American Samoan former American football player who was a linebacker for the St. Louis Cardinals of the National Football League (NFL). Noga played college football for the Hawaii Rainbow Warriors of the University of Hawaiʻi at Mānoa. As a starting outside linebacker, he emerged as one of the team's top tacklers, along with his brother, Al. As a senior in 1986, he was named a second-team All-Western Athletic Conference selection. He went undrafted in the 1987 NFL draft, but was signed as an undrafted free agent by the Cardinals. Noga failed to make the final roster and was cut prior to the beginning of the 1987 season.

That same season, Noga was brought back to the Cardinals to serve as a "replacement player" during the 1987 NFLPA strike. Noga played three games for the Cardinals before the strike ended. In one, Noga returned an interception for a touchdown. After striking players returned to the team, Noga was cut from the roster. The following year, the Indianapolis Colts signed Noga in the offseason, cutting him prior to the start of the 1988 season. The Ottawa Rough Riders of the Canadian Football League (CFL) signed Noga in 1989, but also cut him before he made an appearance.

== Early life ==
Petelo Noga was born on June 24, 1964, in American Samoa, to parents Iosefo and Noela Noga. The Nogas had ten kids, eight of them boys. The Noga family relocated from Samoa to the Kalihi neighborhood of Honolulu, Hawaii, about four or five years after Pete's birth.

Noga attended Farrington High School in Honolulu, and was a member of the school's football team, where he played as a defensive back. Curtis Murayama of The Honolulu Advertiser described Noga as a player with "pretty good agility" and that he was "aggressive and likes contact." Noga was included on Murayama's list of "red-chip" prospects, or players good enough to play for a major NCAA Division I program. He received a second-team All-Oahu Interscholastic Association East pick during his senior year. Noga committed to the University of Hawaii on February 10, 1982.

== College career ==
As a member of the Hawaii Rainbow Warriors, Noga converted to an outside linebacker. In the lead-up to his junior year in 1985, Noga was described as a "leading contender" for a starting outside linebacker job by The Honolulu Advertiser. Following a season-opening loss to Kansas, Noga was announced as a starter prior to Hawaii's first conference matchup against Utah. Noga ended the season tied with his brother, Al Noga, for first on the team in sacks, with a total of eight. Pete was second on the team in tackles for loss with 12.

For his senior year in 1986, Noga was again among the leaders in sacks and tackles for most of the season, trailing only his brother, Al. Noga suffered a knee strain during a game against San Diego State and missed the final two games of the season, including the finale against No. 4 Michigan. As a tribute, Al wore Noga's number 44 during the first half of the Michigan game. For his senior year performance, Noga was both an Associated Press honorable mention All-American and a second-team All-Western Athletic Conference selection.

== Professional career ==
=== St. Louis Cardinals ===
After going undrafted in the 1987 NFL draft, Noga signed with the St. Louis Cardinals on May 20, 1987, joining his older brother, Niko Noga. Pete once again changed positions, this time to middle linebacker, the same position as Niko. St. Louis Post-Dispatch writer Bernie Miklasz described Noga as having a "long-shot chance" of making the Cardinals' regular season roster. Noga was cut by the Cardinals on September 7, 1987.

When the NFLPA strike occurred near the beginning of the 1987 NFL season, Noga flew to St. Louis and hoped for a call from the Cardinals. Noga was signed by the Cardinals as one of 37 players to replace those striking. Among the strikers was Pete's brother, Niko. Noga ended up taking Niko's number 57 jersey during his time with the Cardinals. Noga described crossing the picket line in front of a striking Niko "like hitting him in the back."

It was hard for me to go ahead and sign that contract to play for the St. Louis Cardinals when he was on strike. And at the same time I have to go in and make a living for myself. I can't live under him. ... I talked to him last night. He told me: 'It's up to you. It's your choice, it's your decision, you go ahead and do what's right for you.' ... So I figure what I have done is right.

— Pete Noga (September 25, 1987)

Noga played three games for the Cardinals before being cut. During the Week 3 matchup against the Washington Redskins, Noga returned an interception 60 yards for a touchdown in the 21–28 loss. Noga was cut by the Cardinals on October 21, 1987, after the strike ended.

=== Indianapolis Colts ===
Noga signed with the Indianapolis Colts during the offseason before the 1988 NFL season. As Al was drafted by the Minnesota Vikings, three Noga brothers were in the NFL at the same time. Despite Colts head coach Ron Meyer describing Noga as a "well-conditioned athlete with good physical tools" and linebackers coach Rick Venturi describing him as a "tough, aggressive kid," Noga was waived by the Colts on July 26, 1986.

=== Ottawa Rough Riders ===
Noga signed with the Ottawa Rough Riders of the Canadian Football League (CFL) on April 21, 1989. Head coach Steve Goldman intended for Noga to serve in the defensive end position to replace former ends Ben Hummel and Michael Cline. Noga was cut by the Rough Riders on June 30, 1989.

== Personal life ==
Noga's brothers Al and Niko were both former NFL players. Noga pursued a degree in sociology during his time at the University of Hawaii, and expressed a desire to go into law enforcement after college. Noga speaks Samoan.

In 1990, Noga married Charlotte Twigg at Our Lady of the Mount Catholic Church in Kalihi. As of 2015, Noga resides in Southern California with his family.

== In popular culture ==
Pete and Niko's story during the strike was briefly mentioned in an episode of Jon Bois' YouTube series, Pretty Good.
