= Niko Noga =

American football player (born 1962)

No. 49, 57, 51
- Position: Linebacker

Personal information
- Born: March 1, 1962 (age 64); Honolulu, Hawaii, U.S.
- Listed height: 6 ft 1 in (1.85 m)
- Listed weight: 230 lb (104 kg)

Career information
- High school: Farrington (Honolulu)
- College: Hawaii
- NFL draft: 1984: 8th round, 201st overall pick

Career history
- St. Louis/Phoenix Cardinals (1984–1988); Detroit Lions (1989–1991); Los Angeles Raiders (1992)*; Atlanta Falcons (1994)*
- * Offseason or practice squad member only

Awards and highlights
- WAC Newcomer of the Year (1980); First-team All-WAC (1981)

Career NFL statistics
- Sacks: 7
- Interceptions: 1
- Fumble recoveries: 7
- Stats at Pro Football Reference

Falaniko Noga (born March 1, 1962) is an American former professional football player who was a linebacker for eight seasons in the National Football League (NFL). He played college football for the Hawaii Rainbow Warriors.

Brothers Pete and Al played at the University of Hawai'i and later in the NFL.

== In popular culture ==
Niko and his brother Pete were briefly mentioned in an episode of Jon Bois' YouTube series, Pretty Good.
