= Tony Jordan (American football) =

American football player (born 1965)

No. 32
- Position: Running back

Personal information
- Born: May 8, 1965 (age 61); Rochester, New York, U.S.
- Listed height: 6 ft 2 in (1.88 m)
- Listed weight: 220 lb (100 kg)

Career information
- High school: East (Rochester)
- College: Kansas State (1984–1987)
- NFL draft: 1988: 5th round, 132nd overall pick

Career history
- Phoenix Cardinals (1988–1990); Houston Oilers (1991)*; Dallas Cowboys (1992)*
- * Offseason or practice squad member only

Awards and highlights
- Second-team All-Big Eight (1986)

Career NFL statistics
- Rushing yards: 371
- Rushing average: 2.6
- Touchdowns: 5
- Stats at Pro Football Reference

Anthony T. Jordan (born May 8, 1965) is an American former professional football player who was a running back for two seasons with the Phoenix Cardinals of the National Football League (NFL). He was selected by the Cardinals in the fifth round of the 1988 NFL draft after playing college football for the Kansas State Wildcats.

== Early life and college ==
Anthony T. Jordan was born on May 8, 1965, in Rochester, New York. He attended East High School in Rochester.

Jordan was a four-year letterman for the Kansas State Wildcats of Kansas State University from 1984 to 1987. He rushed 36 times for 131 yards and one touchdown as a freshman in 1984 while also catching two passes for seven yards. In 1985, he recorded 20 carries for 32 yards and one touchdown, and six receptions for 39 yards. In 1986, Jordan totaled 202 rushing attempts for 738 yards and six touchdowns, and 15 catches for 196 yards and one touchdown. He led the Big Eight Conference in yards from scrimmage during the 1986 season with 934 yards, earning United Press International second-team All-Big Eight honors. He rushed 169 times for 692 yards and one touchdown his senior year in 1987 while catching 23 passes for 136 yards and one touchdown.

== Professional career ==
Jordan was selected by the Phoenix Cardinals in the fifth round, with the 132nd overall pick, of the 1988 NFL draft. He officially signed with the team on July 7. He played in nine games, starting two, for the Cardinals during the 1988 season, rushing 61 times for 160 yards and three touchdowns while also catching four passes for 24 yards. Jordan was placed on injured reserve on November 16, 1988. He appeared in 13 games, starting eight, in 1989, recording 83 carries for 211 yards and two touchdowns, and six receptions for 20 yards. He became a free agent after the season and re-signed with the Cardinals on August 3, 1990. Jordan was placed on injured reserve on August 27, 1990, and later released on September 18, 1990.

Jordan signed with the Houston Oilers on April 1, 1991. He was released on September 4, 1991.

He was signed by the Dallas Cowboys on June 13, 1992, but later released on August 10, 1992.
