= Derrick McAdoo =

American gridiron football player (born 1965)

Profile
- Position: Running back

Personal information
- Born: April 2, 1965 (age 61); Pensacola, Florida, U.S.
- Listed height: 5 ft 10 in (1.78 m)
- Listed weight: 200 lb (91 kg)

Career information
- College: Baylor University

Career history
- 1987–88: St. Louis / Phoenix Cardinals
- 1988: Tampa Bay Buccaneers
- 1989–91: Hamilton Tiger-Cats
- 1993: Toronto Argonauts
- 1995: Hamilton Tiger-Cats

Awards and highlights
- CFL East All-Star (1989)
- Stats at Pro Football Reference

Derrick McAdoo (born April 2, 1965) is an American former professional football player who was a running back in the National Football League (NFL) and Canadian Football League (CFL). He was a CFL All-Star in 1989.

McAdoo signed with the St. Louis Cardinals in 1987 after playing football with the Baylor Bears. He rushed for 230 yards in his first season.. He came to Canada in 1989 and played with the Hamilton Tiger-Cats. He had a career season, rushing for 1039 yards and was chosen as an all-star. He later played one season (4 regular season games) with the Toronto Argonauts He now lives in Katy, Texas with his wife and two children.
