= Rod Saddler =

American football player (1965–2018)

No. 72, 70
- Positions: Defensive end, defensive tackle

Personal information
- Born: September 26, 1965; Atlanta, Georgia, U.S.
- Died: August 19, 2018 (aged 52)
- Listed height: 6 ft 5 in (1.96 m)
- Listed weight: 276 lb (125 kg)

Career information
- High school: Columbia (Decatur, Georgia)
- College: Texas A&M
- NFL draft: 1987: 4th round, 90th overall pick

Career history
- St. Louis/Phoenix Cardinals (1987–1991); Cincinnati Bengals (1991); Atlanta Falcons (1992)*
- * Offseason or practice squad member only

Awards and highlights
- Second-team All-SWC (1986)

Career NFL statistics
- Sacks: 12.5
- Fumble recoveries: 4
- Touchdowns: 2
- Stats at Pro Football Reference

Roderick Saddler (September 26, 1965 – August 19, 2018) was an American professional football defensive lineman who played five seasons for the St. Louis/Phoenix Cardinals and the Cincinnati Bengals. He is a cousin of former NFL player Clark Gaines.

Pre-draft measurables
Height	Weight	Arm length	Hand span	40-yard dash	10-yard split	20-yard split	20-yard shuttle	Vertical jump	Broad jump	Bench press
6 ft 5 1/4 in (1.96 m)	276 lb (125 kg)	31 1/2 in (0.80 m)	9 3/4 in (0.25 m)	4.99 s	1.70 s	2.86 s	4.68 s	30.5 in (0.77 m)	9 ft 6 in (2.90 m)	16 reps
All values from NFL Combine

He was selected by the Cardinals in the fourth round of the 1987 NFL draft with the 90th overall pick.

He died on August 19, 2018, from a reaction to a pacemaker.
