= Don Holmes (American football) =

American football player and coach (born 1961)

No. 82, 83
- Position: Wide receiver

Personal information
- Born: April 1, 1961 (age 65); Miami, Florida, U.S.
- Listed height: 5 ft 10 in (1.78 m)
- Listed weight: 180 lb (82 kg)

Career information
- High school: Miami Northwestern Senior (Miami, Florida)
- College: Mesa State
- NFL draft: 1984: 12th round, 318th overall pick

Career history

Playing
- Atlanta Falcons (1985)*; Indianapolis Colts (1986)*; St. Louis/Phoenix Cardinals (1986–1990)
- * Offseason or practice squad member only

Coaching
- Mesa State College (2004–2006) Wide receivers coach; Cologne Centurions (2007) Wide receivers coach; Colorado Mesa University (2007–present) Wide receivers coach

Career NFL statistics
- Receptions: 25
- Receiving yards: 413
- Touchdowns: 1
- Stats at Pro Football Reference

Donald Ira Holmes (born April 1, 1961) is an American football coach and former professional player who is currently the wide receivers coach at Colorado Mesa University, a position he has held since 2007. He was drafted by the Atlanta Falcons in the 12th round of the 1984 NFL draft. He played college football at Mesa State and Colorado.

Although he was selected in the 1984 draft, he elected to return to college that year. During the 1984 season, he attempted to file an exemption to play in the NFL, but was rejected under the "Red Grange Rule" that forbade players from playing both college and pro football in the same year. He joined the Falcons in 1985, but was released and signed by the Indianapolis Colts. After suffering an injury in 1986, he was placed on injured reserve; when the Colts attempted to get him back on the roster, the St. Louis Cardinals picked him off waivers.
