= 1941 NFL draft =

National Football League draft

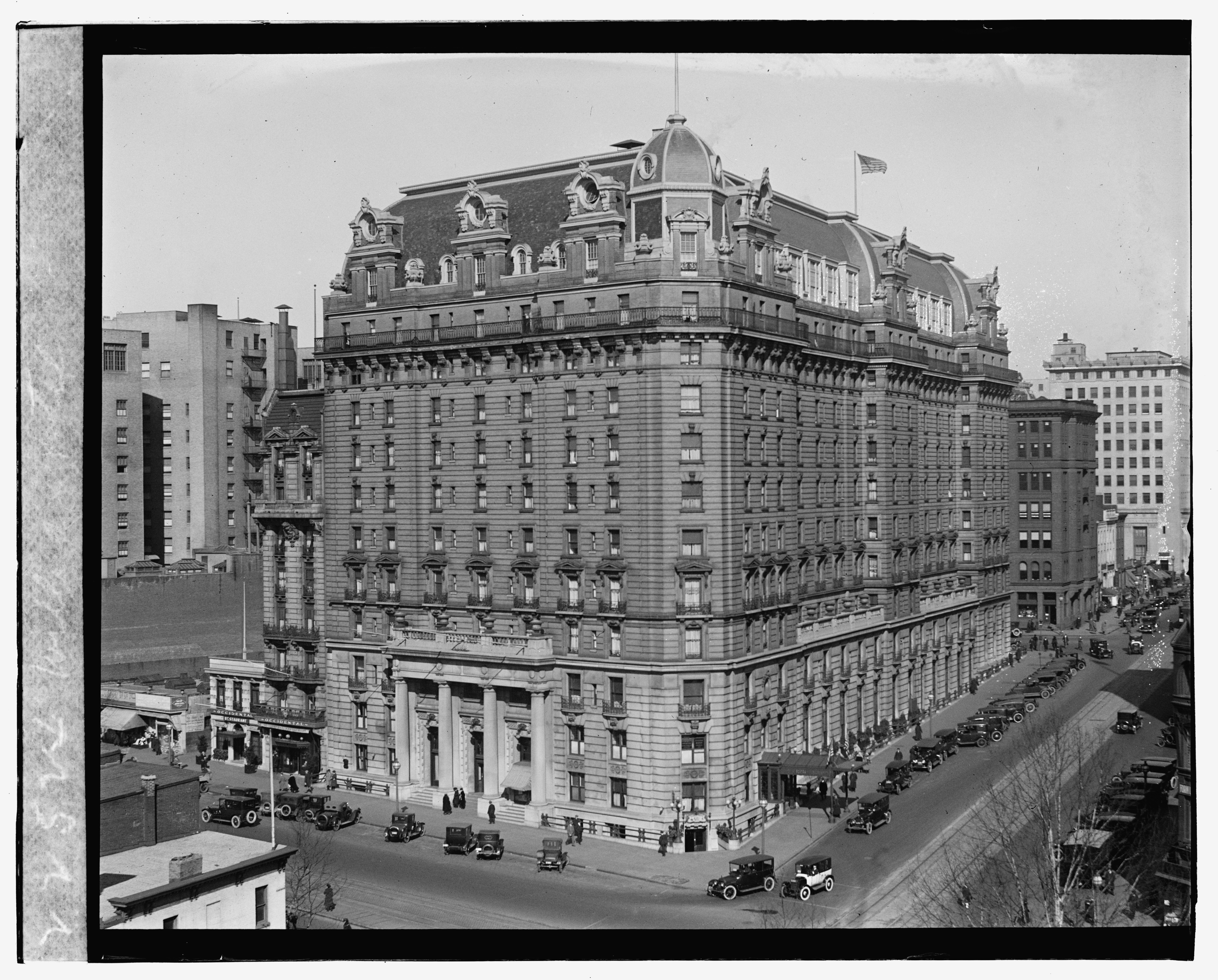
- Willard Hotel (location of the draft), photographed in 1923

General information
- Date: December 10, 1940
- Location: Willard Hotel in Washington, D.C.

Overview
- 204 total selections in 22 rounds
- League: NFL
- First selection: Tom Harmon, HB; Chicago Bears
- Most selections (24): Chicago Bears
- Fewest selections (20): all 9 other teams
- Hall of Famers: 1: RB Tony Canadeo

The 1941 NFL draft was held on December 10, 1940, at the Willard Hotel in Washington, D.C. With the first overall pick of the draft, the Chicago Bears selected halfback Tom Harmon.

The Bears selected 24 players, but forfeited their final four picks because league rules mandated teams could only draft 20 players total.

== Player selections ==
	= Hall of Famer
†	= Pro Bowler (Note: Players are identified as a Pro Bowler if they were selected for the Pro Bowl at any time in their career.)

=== Rounds 1–7 ===
Rnd.	Pick	Team	Player	Pos.	College	Notes
1	1	Chicago Bears	Tom Harmon	HB	Michigan	From Philadelphia Eagles
1	2	Chicago Cardinals	John Kimbrough	FB	Texas A&M	
1	3	Chicago Bears	Norm Standlee ^{†}	FB	Stanford	From Pittsburgh Steelers
1	4	Cleveland Rams	Rudy Mucha	C	Washington	
1	5	Detroit Lions	Jim Thomason	HB	Texas A&M	
1	6	New York Giants	George Franck	HB	Minnesota	
1	7	Green Bay Packers	George Paskvan	FB	Wisconsin	
1	8	Brooklyn Dodgers	Dean McAdams	HB	Washington	
1	9	Chicago Bears	Don Scott	QB	Ohio State	
1	10	Washington Redskins	Forest Evashevski	QB	Michigan	
2	11	Philadelphia Eagles	Art Jones ^{†}	B	Richmond	
2	12	Pittsburgh Steelers	Chet Gladchuk	C	Boston College	
2	13	Chicago Cardinals	Paul Christman	QB	Missouri	
2	14	Cleveland Rams	Marshall "Abe" Shires	T	Tennessee	
2	15	Detroit Lions	Gene Goodreault	E	Boston College	
3	16	Philadelphia Eagles	Marion Pugh	B	Texas A&M	
3	17	Chicago Cardinals	Bob Foxx	B	Tennessee	
3	18	Pittsburgh Steelers	Johnny Knolla	B	Creighton	
3	19	Cleveland Rams	Jay MacDowell	E	Washington	
3	20	Detroit Lions	Harry Hopp ^{†}	B	Nebraska	
3	21	Green Bay Packers	Bob Paffrath	B	Minnesota	
3	22	New York Giants	Frank Reagan	B	Penn	
3	23	Chicago Bears	Hugh Gallarneau ^{†}	B	Stanford	
3	24	Brooklyn Dodgers	Leo Stasica	B	Colorado	
3	25	Washington Redskins	Fred Davis ^{†}	T	Alabama	
4	26	Philadelphia Eagles	Al Ghesquiere	B	Detroit	
4	27	Pittsburgh Steelers	Jim Ringgold	B	Wake Forest	
4	28	Chicago Cardinals	Johnny Clement	B	SMU	
4	29	Cleveland Rams	Walt "Butch" Luther	B	Nebraska	
4	30	Detroit Lions	Augie Lio ^{†}	G	Georgetown	
5	31	Philadelphia Eagles	Royal Kahler	T	Nebraska	
5	32	Chicago Cardinals	Ray Apolskis ^{†}	C	Marquette	
5	33	Pittsburgh Steelers	Vic Sears	T	Oregon State	
5	34	Cleveland Rams	Chet Haliska	B	Oregon	
5	35	Detroit Lions	Bob Nelson	C	Baylor	
5	36	New York Giants	Len Eshmont	B	Fordham	
5	37	Green Bay Packers	Ed Frutig	E	Michigan	
5	38	Brooklyn Dodgers	Ray Frick	C	Penn	
5	38	Chicago Bears	Charlie O'Rourke	B	Boston College	
5	40	Washington Redskins	Jim Stuart	T	Oregon	
6	41	Philadelphia Eagles	Howard "Red" Hickey	E	Arkansas	
6	42	Pittsburgh Steelers	Bob Suffridge	G	Tennessee	
6	43	Chicago Cardinals	Marshall Robnett	G	Texas A&M	
6	44	Cleveland Rams	Jim Kisselburgh	B	Oregon State	
6	45	Detroit Lions	John Tripson ^{†}	T	Mississippi State	
6	46	Green Bay Packers	Herm Rohrig	B	Nebraska	
6	47	New York Giants	Lou DeFilippo	C	Fordham	
6	48	Chicago Bears	Tommy O'Boyle	G	Tulane	
6	49	Brooklyn Dodgers	Eddie Rucinski ^{†}	E	Indiana	
6	50	Washington Redskins	Ed Cifers ^{†}	E	Tennessee	
7	51	Philadelphia Eagles	Julius Battista	G	Florida	
7	52	Chicago Cardinals	John Kuzman	T	Fordham	
7	53	Pittsburgh Steelers	Jim Roberts	C	Marshall	
7	54	Cleveland Rams	Ray Prochaska	E	Nebraska	
7	55	Detroit Lions	John Jett	E	Wake Forest	
7	56	New York Giants	Don Vosberg	E	Marquette	
7	57	Green Bay Packers	Bill Telesmanic	E	San Francisco	
7	58	Brooklyn Dodgers	Hal Newman	E	Alabama	
7	59	Chicago Bears	John Federovitch ^{†}	T	Davis & Elkins	
7	60	Washington Redskins	Al Krueger ^{†}	E	USC	

=== Round 8 ===
Pick #	NFL team	Player	Position	College
61	Chicago Bears	Fred Hartman	Tackle	Rice
62	Chicago Bears	Dave Rankin	End	Purdue
63	Chicago Cardinals	George Kracum	Back	Pittsburgh
64	Cleveland Rams	Tony Gallovich	Back	Wake Forest
65	Detroit Lions	Joe Manzo	Tackle	Boston College
66	Green Bay Packers	Bill Kuusisto	Guard	Minnesota
67	New York Giants	Len Younce	Guard	Oregon State
68	Chicago Bears	Al Matuza	Center	Georgetown
69	Brooklyn Dodgers	Glenn Jackson	Center	Texas
70	Washington Redskins	Henry Wilder	Back	Iowa State

=== Round 9 ===
Pick #	NFL team	Player	Position	College
71	Philadelphia Eagles	P. K. Rogers	Back	East Texas State
72	Chicago Cardinals	Tom Vargo	End	Penn State
73	Pittsburgh Steelers	Ervin "Buddy" Elrod	End	Mississippi State
74	Cleveland Rams	Milt Simington	Guard	Arkansas
75	Detroit Lions	Jasper Davis	Back	Duke
76	New York Giants	Ben Sohn	Guard	USC
77	Green Bay Packers	Tony Canadeo	Back	Gonzaga
78	Brooklyn Dodgers	Henry Toczylowski	Back	Boston College
79	Chicago Bears	Hal Lahar	Guard	Oklahoma
80	Washington Redskins	Bill Grimmett	End	Tulsa

=== Round 10 ===
Pick #	NFL team	Player	Position	College
81	Philadelphia Eagles	Don Williams	Tackle	Texas
82	Pittsburgh Steelers	Ralph Fritz	Guard	Michigan
83	Chicago Cardinals	Ray Mallouf	Back	SMU
84	Cleveland Rams	John Pendergast	Center	Wake Forest
85	Detroit Lions	Ted Pavelec	Tackle	Detroit
86	Green Bay Packers	Mike Byelene	Back	Purdue
87	New York Giants	Walt Matuszczak	Back	Cornell
88	Chicago Bears	Jim "Sweet" LaLanne	Back	North Carolina
89	Brooklyn Dodgers	Jim Langhurst	Back	Ohio State
90	Washington Redskins	Ed Hickerson	Guard	Alabama

=== Round 11 ===
Pick #	NFL team	Player	Position	College
91	Philadelphia Eagles	Marshall Stenstrom	Back	Oregon
92	Chicago Cardinals	Jack Sommers	Center	UCLA
93	Pittsburgh Steelers	Emil Uremovich	Tackle	Indiana
94	Cleveland Rams	Nick Drahos	Tackle	Cornell
95	Detroit Lions	Milt Piepul	Back	Notre Dame
96	New York Giants	Bobby Peoples	Back	USC
97	Green Bay Packers	Paul Heimenz	Center	Northwestern
98	Brooklyn Dodgers	Bernie Weiner	Tackle	Kansas State
99	Chicago Bears	Jim Hardin	End	Kentucky
100	Washington Redskins	Joe Aguirre	End	St. Mary's (CA)

=== Round 12 ===
Pick #	NFL team	Player	Position	College
101	Philadelphia Eagles	John Patrick	Back	Penn State
102	Pittsburgh Steelers	Paul Severin	End	North Carolina
103	Chicago Cardinals	Charlie Armstrong	Back	Mississippi College
104	Cleveland Rams	Harold Punches	Guard	Colorado
105	Detroit Lions	Billy Jefferson	Back	Mississippi State
106	Green Bay Packers	Mike Enich	Tackle	Iowa
107	New York Giants	Andy Marefos	Back	St. Mary's (CA)
108	Chicago Bears	Bob Morrow	Back	Illinois Wesleyan
109	Brooklyn Dodgers	Harvey Johnson	Back	Mississippi State
110	Washington Redskins	Herbert "Jack" Banta	Back	USC

=== Round 13 ===
Pick #	NFL team	Player	Position	College
111	Philadelphia Eagles	Joe Hoague	Back	Colgate
112	Chicago Cardinals	Wayne Pitts	Back	Arizona State
113	Pittsburgh Steelers	Russ Cotton	Back	Texas Western
114	Cleveland Rams	Bill McMurray	End	Murray State
115	Detroit Lions	Maurice Britt	End	Arkansas
116	New York Giants	Cass Brovarney	Guard	Detroit
117	Green Bay Packers	Ed Heffernan	Back	St. Mary's (CA)
118	Brooklyn Dodgers	George Kinard	Guard	Ole Miss
119	Chicago Bears	Jim Johnson	Back	Santa Clara
120	Washington Redskins	Roy Conn	Tackle	Arizona

=== Round 14 ===
Pick #	NFL team	Player	Position	College
121	Philadelphia Eagles	Les Dodson	Back	Ole Miss
122	Pittsburgh Steelers	J. W. Goree	Guard	LSU
123	Chicago Cardinals	Joe Lokanc	Guard	Northwestern
124	Cleveland Rams	Bill Elmore	Back	California
125	Detroit Lions	Alex Schibanoff	Tackle	Franklin & Marshall
126	Green Bay Packers	Del Lyman	Tackle	UCLA
127	New York Giants	Arnie Moore	End	Mississippi State
128	Chicago Bears	Johnny Martin	Back	Oklahoma
129	Brooklyn Dodgers	Lloyd Cheatham	Back	Auburn
130	Washington Redskins	Deward Tornell	Back	San Jose State

=== Round 15 ===
Pick #	NFL team	Player	Position	College
131	Philadelphia Eagles	Alex Lukachick	End	Boston College
132	Chicago Cardinals	Claude White	Center	Ohio State
133	Pittsburgh Steelers	John Eibner	Tackle	Kentucky
134	Cleveland Rams	Warren Desmore	Center	Toledo
135	Detroit Lions	Perry Scott	End	Muhlenberg
136	New York Giants	Johnny Black	Back	Arizona
137	Green Bay Packers	Johnny Frieberger	End	Arkansas
138	Brooklyn Dodgers	Mike Jurich	Tackle	Denver
139	Chicago Bears	Jack Mulkey	End	Fresno State
140	Washington Redskins	Morris Buckingham	Center	San Jose State

=== Round 16 ===
Pick #	NFL team	Player	Position	College
141	Philadelphia Eagles	Bill Conatser	Back	Texas A&M
142	Pittsburgh Steelers	Wes McAfee	Back	Duke
143	Chicago Cardinals	Gates Kimball	Tackle	North Carolina
144	Cleveland Rams	Gordon Wilson	Guard	Texas Western
145	Detroit Lions	George Sarres	Center	Providence
146	Green Bay Packers	Ernie Pannell	Tackle	Texas A&M
147	New York Giants	Wilson Lucas	End	Baylor
148	Chicago Bears	Bob Osterman	Center	Notre Dame
149	Brooklyn Dodgers	Warren Alfson	Guard	Nebraska
150	Washington Redskins	Ken Dow	Back	Oregon State

=== Round 17 ===
Pick #	NFL team	Player	Position	College
151	Philadelphia Eagles	John Yauckoes	Tackle	Boston College
152	Chicago Cardinals	Ray Schultz	Guard	Missouri
153	Pittsburgh Steelers	Terry Fox	Back	Miami (FL)
154	Cleveland Rams	Kirk Hershey	End	Cornell
155	Detroit Lions	Fred Gage	Back	Wisconsin
156	New York Giants	Jack Anderson	Tackle	Baylor
157	Green Bay Packers	Bob Saggau	Back	Notre Dame
158	Brooklyn Dodgers	Dick McGowen	Back	Auburn
159	Chicago Bears	Bill Glenn	Back	Eastern Illinois State
160	Washington Redskins	Stan McRae	End	Michigan State

=== Round 18 ===
Pick #	NFL team	Player	Position	College
161	Philadelphia Eagles	Joe McFadden	Back	Georgetown
162	Pittsburgh Steelers	Bill Cornwall	Tackle	Furman
163	Chicago Cardinals	Fred Harris	Tackle	SMU
164	Cleveland Rams	Cobbie Lee	Back	Murray State
165	Detroit Lions	Charlie Ishmael	Back	Kentucky
166	Green Bay Packers	Helge Pukema	Guard	Minnesota
167	New York Giants	Dave Allerdice	Back	Princeton
168	Chicago Bears	Ollie Hahnenstein	Back	Northwestern
169	Brooklyn Dodgers	Lonnie McCurry	Guard	Texas Tech
170	Washington Redskins	Joe Osmanski	Back	Holy Cross

=== Round 19 ===
Pick #	NFL team	Player	Position	College
171	Philadelphia Eagles	John Shonk	End	West Virginia
172	Chicago Cardinals	Mel Aussieker	Back	St. Louis
173	Pittsburgh Steelers	George Kerr	Guard	Boston College
174	Cleveland Rams	Harold Hursh	Back	Indiana
175	Detroit Lions	Len Isberg	Back	Oregon
176	New York Giants	Chuck Peters	Back	Penn State
177	Green Bay Packers	Bob Hayes	End	Toledo
178	Brooklyn Dodgers	Dave Parker	End	Hardin–Simmons
179	Chicago Bears	Alex Winterson	Tackle	Duke
180	Washington Redskins	Earl Fullilove	Tackle	Georgetown

=== Round 20 ===
Pick #	NFL team	Player	Position	College
181	Philadelphia Eagles	L. B. Russell	Back	Hardin–Simmons
182	Pittsburgh Steelers	Bob Bjorklund	End	Minnesota
183	Chicago Cardinals	Frank Platt	Tackle	Penn State
184	Cleveland Rams	Leo Barnes	Tackle	LSU
185	Detroit Lions	Paul Friedlander	Back	Carnegie Tech
186	Green Bay Packers	Jim Strasbaugh	Back	Ohio State
187	New York Giants	Earl Stone	Center	Washington State
188	Chicago Bears	Jack Odle	Quarterback	TCU
189	Brooklyn Dodgers	Joe Ungerer	Tackle	Fordham
190	Washington Redskins	Ed Hiestand	End	Vanderbilt

=== Round 21 ===
Pick #	NFL team	Player	Position	College
191	New York Giants	Jack Dungan	Tackle	Arizona
192	Green Bay Packers	Joe Bailey	Center	Kentucky
193	Brooklyn Dodgers	Jules Koshlap	Back	Georgetown
194	Chicago Bears	Hunter Corbern	Guard	Mississippi State
195	Washington Redskins	Tom Riggs	Tackle	Illinois
201	Philadelphia Eagles	Charley Henke	Guard	Texas A&M
202	Pittsburgh Steelers	Jim Castiglia	Back	Georgetown

=== Round 22 ===
Pick #	NFL team	Player	Position	College
196	Green Bay Packers	Bruno Malinowski	Back	Holy Cross
197	New York Giants	Ted Fisher	End	Carnegie Tech
198	Chicago Bears	Dave Buck	Tackle	Colgate
199	Brooklyn Dodgers	Ken Whitlow	Center	Rice
200	Washington Redskins	Lee Gentry	Back	Tulsa
203	Philadelphia Eagles	Mike Fernella	Tackle	Akron
204	Pittsburgh Steelers	Mort Landsberg	Back	Cornell

Hall of Famer

== Hall of Famers ==
- Tony Canadeo, halfback from Gonzaga University taken 9th round 77th overall by the Green Bay Packers.

Inducted: Professional Football Hall of Fame class of 1974.

== Notable undrafted players ==
Pro Bowler

Original NFL team	Player	Pos.	College	Notes
Cleveland Rams	Charley Seabright	HB/QB	West Virginia	
