= 1941 Philadelphia Eagles season =

NFL team season

- Head coach: Greasy Neale
- Home stadium: Municipal Stadium

Results
- Record: 2–8–1
- Division place: 4th NFL Eastern
- Playoffs: Did not qualify

The 1941 season was the Philadelphia Eagles' ninth in the National Football League (NFL). The team improved on their 1–10 record from the previous season, but just barely, winning two games, and they missed out on the playoffs again.

== Offseason ==
After a year sharing Shibe Park with the Philadelphia Athletics and Philadelphia Phillies Major League Baseball teams in 1940, the Eagles returned to the larger Philadelphia Municipal Stadium they had used from 1936 to 1939.

In late 1940, Art Rooney, owner of the Pittsburgh Steelers (then known as the Pittsburgh Pirates), bought a 70 percent stake in the Eagles after selling the Pirates to New York entrepreneur Alexis Thompson. Thompson wanted to move the Pittsburgh franchise to Boston, but before the start of the 1941 season Rooney and Thompson agreed that their franchises would switch places, with Rooney moving the Eagles to Pittsburgh, where they would be renamed the Steelers, and Thompson moving the Pittsburgh team (whom he had renamed the Iron Men) to Philadelphia, where they would take up the Eagles name. The switch meant the rosters of both teams were made up of players who had played in the other city the previous season, though many were traded back before the start of the season.

Coach Greasy Neale held training camp at the High School Bowl in Two Rivers, Wisconsin, about 50 miles (80 km) southeast of Green Bay, Wisconsin, and 90 miles (140 km) north of Milwaukee on Lake Michigan.

=== NFL draft ===
The 1941 NFL draft was held on December 10, 1940. As the team with the worst record from the previous season, the Eagles had the first pick in all but the last two of the draft's 22 rounds. Because these players were drafted before the Eagles and Steelers swapped cities, these players ended up playing for the Pittsburgh Steelers in 1941. The Pittsburgh draft picks would come to Philadelphia, and vice versa, though five players originally picked by the original Eagles ended up being traded to the new Eagles franchise.

The Chicago Bears (From Philadelphia Eagles) had the number one pick in the draft. They choose Tom Harmon, the 1940 Heisman Trophy winner, a Halfback out of the University of Michigan

=== Player selections ===
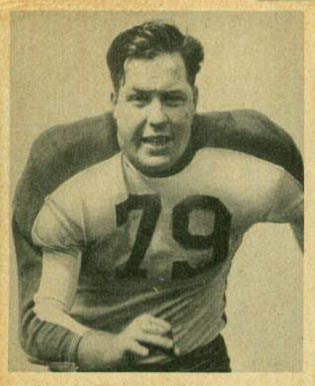
Oregon State tackle Vic Sears, selected in the fifth round of the 1941 draft, had a 13 year career as an Eagle.

The table shows the Eagles selections and what picks they had that were traded away and the team that ended up with that pick. It is possible the Eagles' pick ended up with this team via another team that the Eagles made a trade with. Not shown are acquired picks that the Eagles traded away. These picks were the players that the Pittsburgh Pirates made before the team swap between owners.

Pro Bowler	Hall of Famer	Picks made by Pittsburgh Pirates that became Eagles in 1941

Round	Pick	Player	Position	School
1	1	Traded to the Chicago Bears		
2	11	Art Jones	Back	Richmond
3	16	Marion Pugh	Back	Texas A&M
4	26	Al Ghesquiere	Back	University of Detroit
5	31	Royal Kahler	Tackle	University of Nebraska
	Pitt; 33	Vic Sears	Tackle	Oregon State
6	41	Red Hickey	End	University of Arkansas
	Pitt; 42	Bob Suffridge	Guard	Tennessee
7	51	Julius "Mush" Battista	Guard	Florida
8	61	Traded to the Chicago Bears		
9	71	P. K. Rogers	Back	East Texas State
10	81	Don Williams	Tackle	Texas
	Pitt; 82	Ralph Fritz	Guard	Michigan
11	91	Marshall Stenstrom	Back	Oregon
12	101	John Patrick	Back	Penn State
13	111	Joe Hoague	Back	Colgate
14	121	Les Dodson	Back	Mississippi
15	131	Alex Lukachick	End	Boston College
16	141	Bill Conatser	Back	Texas A&M
17	151	John Yauckoes	Tackle	Boston College
18	161	Joe McFadden	Back	Georgetown (DC)
19	171	John Shonk	End	West Virginia
	Pitt; 173	George Kerr	Guard	Boston College
20	181	L. B. Russell	Back	Hardin–Simmons
21	201	Charley Henke ^{(from Redskins)}	Guard	Texas A&M
	Pitt; 202	Jim Castiglia	Back	Georgetown (DC)
22	203	Mike Fernella ^{(from Bears)}	Tackle	Akron

== Regular season ==
=== Schedule ===
Game	Date	Opponent	Result	Record	Venue	Attendance	Recap	Sources
1	September 13	**New York Giants**	**L** 0–24	0–1	Municipal Stadium	25,478	Recap	
2	September 21	at **Pittsburgh Steelers**	**W** 10–7	1–1	Forbes Field	12,893	Recap	
3	September 27	**Brooklyn Dodgers**	**L** 13–24	1–2	Municipal Stadium	16,341	Recap	
—	Bye							
4	October 12	at **New York Giants**	**L** 0–16	1–3	Polo Grounds	30,842	Recap	
5	October 19	**Washington Redskins**	**L** 17–21	1–4	Municipal Stadium	19,071	Recap	
6	October 26	Chicago Cardinals	**W** 21–14	2–4	Municipal Stadium	12,683	Recap	
7	November 2	at **Brooklyn Dodgers**	**L** 6–15	2–5	Ebbets Field	15,899	Recap	
8	November 9	**Pittsburgh Steelers**	**T** 7–7	2–5–1	Municipal Stadium	15,601	Recap	
9	November 16	at Detroit Lions	**L** 17–21	2–6—1	Briggs Stadium	16,306	Recap	
—	Bye							
10	November 30	Chicago Bears	**L** 14–49	2–7–1	Municipal Stadium	32,608	Recap	
11	December 7	at **Washington Redskins**	**L** 14–20	2–8–1	Griffith Stadium	27,102	Recap	
Note: Intra-division opponents are in **bold** text. • Sept. 13 & 27: Saturday night games

=== Game summaries ===
The Eagles played 11 games over an NFL season that was 14 weeks long. The season started on September 7 and ended on December 7.

==== Game 2: at Pittsburgh Steelers ====
Week 2: Philadelphia Eagles at Pittsburgh Steelers – Game summary

Quarter	1	2	3	4	Total
**Eagles**	0	3	7	0	**10**
Steelers	0	0	7	0	**7**

at Forbes Field, Pittsburgh, Pennsylvania

- Date: September 21, 1941
- Game time: 1:00 p.m. EST
- Pro-Football-Reference.com

Game information
**First quarter**
- No scoring plays.

**Second quarter**

- PHI – Len Barnum 43-yard field goal. Eagles 3–0.

**Third quarter**

- PIT – Boyd Brumbaugh 4-yard run (Jack Sanders kick). Steelers 7–3.
- PHI – Lou Tomasetti 40-yard pass from Dan DeSantis (Len Barnum kick). Eagles 10–7.

**Fourth quarter**

- No scoring plays.

The Eagles travel across the state of Pennsylvania to play the renamed Pittsburgh Steelers for the first time since the franchises swapped cities.

==== Game 5: vs Washington Redskins ====
Week 7: Philadelphia Eagles vs Washington Redskins – Game summary

Quarter	1	2	3	4	Total
**Redskins**	0	14	0	7	**21**
Eagles	14	0	3	0	**17**

at Philadelphia Municipal Stadium, Philadelphia

- Date: October 19, 1941
- Game time: 1:00 p.m. EST
- Pro-Football-Reference.com

Game information
**First quarter**
- PHI – Dick Humbert 4-yard pass from Tommy Thompson (Nick Basca kick). Eagles 7–0.
- PHI – Bob Krieger 21-yard pass from Tommy Thompson (Nick Basca kick). Eagles 14–0.

**Second quarter**

- WAS – Andy Farkas 5-yard rush (Joe Aguirre kick). Eagles 14–7.
- WAS – Ed Justice 31-yard pass from Sammy Baugh (Joe Aguirre kick). Tied 14–14.

**Third quarter**

- PHI – Nick Basca 15-yard field goal. Eagles 17–14.

**Fourth quarter**

- WAS – Bob Masterson 22-yard pass from Sammy Baugh (Bob Masterson kick). Redskins 21–17.

The defending 1940 NFL Eastern Division Champions, Washington Redskins make a visit to Philadelphia to play the Eagles. Washington lost the 1940 NFL Championship Game to the Chicago Bears 73–0. The Eagles will host the Bears in week 12 and travel to Washington, D.C. to re-play the Redskins in week 14 to close out the 1941 season.

==== Game 8: vs Pittsburgh Steelers ====
Week 10: Philadelphia Eagles vs Pittsburgh Steelers – Game summary

Quarter	1	2	3	4	Total
Steelers	0	0	7	0	**7**
Eagles	7	0	0	0	**7**

at Philadelphia Municipal Stadium, Philadelphia, Pennsylvania

- Date: November 9, 1941
- Game time: 1:00 p.m. EST
- Pro-Football-Reference.com

Game information
**First quarter**
- PHI – Jim Castiglia 47-yard rush (Nick Basca kick). Eagles 7–0.

**Second quarter**

- No scoring plays.

**Third quarter**

- PIT – Art Jones 25-yard rush (Jack Sanders kick). Tied 7–7.

**Fourth quarter**

- No scoring plays.

The Eagles' cross-state rivals returned to Philadelphia for a rematch of the week 3 game won by the Eagles. The Eagles entered the game with two wins, while the Steelers were winless.

==== Game 11: at Washington Redskins ====
Week 11: Philadelphia Eagles at Washington Redskins – Game summary

Quarter	1	2	3	4	Total
Eagles	7	0	7	0	**14**
**Redskins**	0	7	0	13	**20**

at Griffith Stadium, Washington

- Date: December 7, 1941
- Game time: 2:00 p.m. EST
- Game weather: Mostly Cloudy Temp: 42 F Humidty: 34% Wind: 18 mph
- Game attendance: 27,102
- Pro-Football-Reference.com

Game information
**First quarter**
- PHI - Jack Banta 7-yd run (Nick Basca kick), 7-0 Eagles

**Second quarter**

- WAS - Al Krueger 19-yd pass from Sammy Baugh (Joe Aguirre kick), Tied 7-7

**Third quarter**

- PHI - Hank Piro 6-yd pass from Tommy Thompson (Nick Basca kick), 14-7 Eagles

**Fourth quarter**

- WAS - Joe Aguirre 9-yd pass from Sammy Baugh (kick failed), 14-13 Eagles
- WAS - Joe Aguirre 4-yd pass from Sammy Baugh (Joe Aguirre kick), 20-14 Redskins

Approximately twelve minutes before the start of the game, the attack on Pearl Harbor began in Hawaii. It was announced by the White House Press Secretary approximately twenty minutes after the start of the game, and while no official announcement was made at Griffith Stadium, many military, government and diplomatic personnel were paged to return to their offices starting midway through the first quarter. Due to this, and sheer curiosity on the part of many others of the 27,000 spectators present, the game ended with nearly no press or spectators remaining. Washington won the game, 20-14, leaving the Eagles at 2-8-1 on the season.

=== Standings ===
NFL Eastern Division
	W	L	T	PCT	DIV	PF	PA	STK
New York Giants	8	3	0	.727	6–2	238	114	L1
Brooklyn Dodgers	7	4	0	.636	6–2	158	127	W2
Washington Redskins	6	5	0	.545	5–3	176	174	W1
Philadelphia Eagles	2	8	1	.200	1–6–1	119	218	L3
Pittsburgh Steelers	1	9	1	.100	1–6–1	103	276	L2

Note: Tie games were not officially counted in the standings until 1972.

== Roster ==
(All time List of Philadelphia Eagles players in franchise history)

The 1941 Philadelphia Eagles roster is made up of 39 players which 32 are rookies.

1941 Pro Bowl Pro All-Star

No.	Player	Age	Pos.	GP	GS	Weight	Height	Years	College
33	Jack Banta	24	HB	6	5	191	5–11	Rookie	USC
13	Len Barnum	29	B-P-PK	11	8	200	6–0	3	West Virginia Wesleyan
27	Sam Bartholomew	24	FB	9	2	188	5–11	Rookie	Tennessee
47	Nick Basca	25	HB-PK	11	0	170	5–8	Rookie	Villanova
55	Frank Bausch	33	C	4	4	220	6–3	7	Kansas
50	Bob Bjorklund	23	C-LB-E	7	0	225	6–2	Rookie	Minnesota
84	Larry Cabrelli	24	E-DB	7	2	194	5–11	Rookie	Colgate
31	Jim Castiglia	23	FB	11	6	208	5–11	Rookie	Georgetown (DC)
61	Tony Cemore	24	G	10	1	210	6–0	Rookie	Creighton
67	Enio Conti	28	G	9	8	204	5–11	Rookie	Bucknell
49	Dan DeSantis	23	HB	11	4	180	6–0	Rookie	Niagara
26	Dave DiFilippo	25	G	5	2	210	5–10	Rookie	Villanova
76	John Eibner	27	T	11	9	228	6–2	Rookie	Kentucky
	Bernie Feibish	22	C	3	0	223	6–2	Rookie	NYU
83	Jack Ferrante	25	E-DE	3	0	197	6–1	Rookie	none
36	Terry Fox	23	FB-LB	11	2	208	6–1	Rookie	Miami (FL)
70	Joe Frank	26	T	11	0	217	6–1	Rookie	Georgetown (DC)
63	Ralph Fritz	24	G	10	1	202	5–9	Rookie	Michigan
62	Woody Gerber	21	G	5	1	223	6–0	Rookie	Alabama
11	Lou Ghecas	23	HB	8	0	175	5–9	Rookie	Georgetown (DC)
37	Fred Gloden	23	HB	6	0	187	5–10	Rookie	Tulane
51	Lyle Graham	26	C	11	7	210	6–3	Rookie	Richmond
80	Gran Harrison	24	E	1	0	211	6–3	Rookie	Mississippi State
80	Kirk Hershey	23	E	6	0	215	6–2	Rookie	Carroll (WI), Cornell
43	Jack Hinkle	24	B	1	0	195	6–0	1	Syracuse
81	Dick Humbert*	23	E-DE	11	8	179	6–1	Rookie	Richmond
82	Bob Krieger	23	E	11	11	190	6–1	Rookie	Dartmouth
30	Mort Landsberg	22	HB	11	7	180	5–11	Rookie	Cornell
40	Wes McAfee	23	HB	8	1	175	5–11	Rookie	Duke
63	Rupert Pate	24	G	1	0	205	6–1	1	Wake Forest
89	Hank Piro	24	E	10	1	186	6–0	Rookie	Syracuse
77	Phil Ragazzo	26	T-G	10	10	216	6–0	3	Case Western Reserve
79	Vic Sears	23	T-DT	11	2	223	6–3	Rookie	Oregon State
85	John Shonk	23	E	10	0	190	6–1	Rookie	West Virginia
71	Cecil Sturgeon	22	T	6	0	254	6–2	Rookie	North Dakota State
60	Bob Suffridge	25	G	10	9	205	6–0	Rookie	Tennessee
10	Tommy Thompson	25	QB	11	5	192	6–1	1	Tulsa
15	Lou Tomasetti	25	FB-HB	6	3	198	6–0	2	Bucknell
39	Foster Watkins	24	QB-HB	11	1	163	5–9	1	West Texas A&M
72	Burr West	23	T	10	1	220	6–1	Rookie	Tennessee

== Honors and rewards ==
- Rookie end Dick Humbert finished second in receptions with 29 (league leader had 58), fourth in receiving yards with 332 (league leader had 738) and joint-fourth in receiving touchdowns with 3 (league leader had 10).
- Humbert was selected for the All-Star Game.
