= 1941 Pittsburgh Steelers season =

NFL team season

- Owner: Art Rooney, Bert Bell
- Head coach: Bert Bell, Aldo Donelli, Walt Kiesling
- Home stadium: Forbes Field

Results
- Record: 1–9–1
- Division place: 5th NFL Eastern
- Playoffs: Did not qualify

The 1941 Pittsburgh Steelers season was the franchise's 9th season in the National Football League (NFL). In the offseason, the team had been sold and then re-acquired (more or less) in a bizarre series of transactions which has come to be referred to as the "Pennsylvania Polka". The roster consisted of many players who had played for the Philadelphia Eagles the previous year, who joined the Steelers as a result of the moves.

== Offseason ==
Bert Bell became half-owner of the team and he named himself the head coach. After starting the season with two straight losses, Aldo "Buff" Donelli was brought in. Donelli was acting concurrently as head coach at Duquesne University, and when the team's schedules prevented him from fulfilling both roles, he stepped down as the Steelers' coach in favor of Walt Kiesling. The team held training camp in Hershey, Pennsylvania.

== Regular season ==
=== Schedule ===
Game	Date	Opponent	Result	Record	Venue	Attendance	Recap	Sources
1	September 7	at Cleveland Rams	**L** 14–17	0–1	Rubber Bowl	23,720	Recap	
2	September 21	**Philadelphia Eagles**	**L** 7–10	0–2	Forbes Field	12,893	Recap	
3	October 5	**New York Giants**	**L** 10–37	0–3	Forbes Field	13,458	Recap	
4	October 12	**Washington Redskins**	**L** 20–24	0–4	Forbes Field	18,733	Recap	
5	October 19	at **New York Giants**	**L** 7–28	0–5	Polo Grounds	34,604	Recap	
6	October 26	at Chicago Bears	**L** 7–34	0–6	Wrigley Field	17,212	Recap	
7	November 2	at **Washington Redskins**	**L** 3–23	0–7	Griffith Stadium	30,755	Recap	
8	November 9	at **Philadelphia Eagles**	**T** 7–7	0–7–1	Municipal Stadium	15,601	Recap	
9	November 16	**Brooklyn Dodgers**	**W** 14–7	1–7–1	Ebbets Field	12,336	Recap	
10	November 23	Green Bay Packers	**L** 7–54	1–8–1	Forbes Field	15,202	Recap	
11	November 30	at **Brooklyn Dodgers**	**L** 7–35	1–9–1	Ebbets Field	12,336	Recap	
Note: Intra-division opponents are in **bold** text.

=== Game summaries ===
==== Game 1 (Sunday September 7, 1941): Cleveland Rams ====
	1	2	3	4	Total
Steelers	0	14	0	0	**14**
**Rams**	10	7	0	0	**17**

at Rubber Bowl, Akron, Ohio

- Game time:
- Game weather:
- Game attendance: 23,720
- Referee:

Scoring Drives:

- Cleveland – Magnani 93 kick return (Adams kick)
- Cleveland – FG Adams 40
- Pittsburgh – Hackney 4 run (Sanders kick)
- Pittsburgh – Jones 34 run (Sanders kick)
- Cleveland – McDonough 10 pass from Hall (Adams kick)

==== Game 2 (Sunday, September 21, 1941): Philadelphia Eagles ====
	1	2	3	4	Total
**Eagles**	0	3	7	0	**10**
Steelers	0	0	7	0	**7**

at Forbes Field, Pittsburgh, Pennsylvania

- Game time:
- Game weather:
- Game attendance: 12,893
- Referee:

Scoring Drives:

- Philadelphia – FG Barnum 43
- Pittsburgh – Brumbaugh 4 run (Sanders kick)
- Philadelphia – Tomasetti 40 pass from DeSantis (Barnum kick)

==== Game 3 (Sunday October 5, 1941): New York Giants ====
	1	2	3	4	Total
**Giants**	3	0	14	20	**37**
Steelers	3	0	7	0	**10**

at Forbes Field, Pittsburgh, Pennsylvania

- Game time:
- Game weather:
- Game attendance: 13,458
- Referee:

Scoring Drives:

- Pittsburgh – FG Niccolai 22
- New York – FG Marefos 24
- New York – Cuff 9 pass from Leemans (Cuff kick)
- Pittsburgh – Cichefski 72 pass from Brumbaugh (Niccolai kick)
- New York – Yeager 53 pass from Pugh (Marefos kick)
- New York – Poole 16 pss from Eshmont (Cuff kick)
- New York – Reagan 21 run (kick failed)
- New York – Reagan 8 run (Cuff kick)

==== Game 4 (Sunday October 12, 1941): Washington Redskins ====
	1	2	3	4	Total
**Redskins**	7	3	14	0	**24**
Steelers	0	7	0	13	**20**

at Forbes Field, Pittsburgh, Pennsylvania

- Game time:
- Game weather:
- Game attendance: 30,842
- Referee:

Scoring Drives:

- Washington – Todd 35 pass from Filchock (Materson kick)
- Pittsburgh – Riffle 10 pass from Donelli (Niccolai kick)
- Washington – FG Aguirre 39
- Washington – Todd 7 run (Masterson kick)
- Washington – R. Hare 7 run (Masterson kick)
- Pittsburgh – Jones 59 pass from McDonough (Niccolai kick)
- Pittsburgh – Brumbaugh 1 run (kick failed)

==== Game 5 (Sunday October 19, 1941): New York Giants ====
	1	2	3	4	Total
Steelers	0	7	0	0	**7**
**Giants**	0	7	7	14	**28**

at Polo Grounds, New York, New York

- Game time:
- Game weather:
- Game attendance: 34,604
- Referee:

Scoring Drives:

- New York – Cope recovered blocked kick in end zone (Marefos kick)
- Pittsburgh – Looney 66 pass from Brumbaugh (Sanders kick)
- New York – Leemans 1 run (Cuff kick)
- New York – Marefos 1 run (Marefos kick)
- New York – Reagan 3 run (Marefos kick)

==== Game 6 (Sunday October 26, 1941): Chicago Bears ====
	1	2	3	4	Total
Steelers	0	7	0	0	**7**
**Bears**	7	14	7	6	**34**

at Wrigley Field, Chicago, Illinois

- Game time:
- Game weather:
- Game attendance: 17,212
- Referee:

Scoring Drives:

- Chicago Bears – Osmanski 13 run (Snyder kick)
- Chicago Bears – McAfee 33 run (Snyder kick)
- Chicago Bears – Kavanaugh 45 pass from Luckman (Maniaci kick)
- Pittsburgh – Hoague 14 pass from Rivvle (Niccolai kick)
- Chicago Bears – Pool 56 pass from Luckman
- Chicago Bears – Gallameau 1 run (kick failed)

==== Game 7 (Sunday November 2, 1941): Washington Redskins ====
	1	2	3	4	Total
Steelers	0	3	0	0	**3**
**Redskins**	7	10	0	6	**23**

at Griffith Stadium, Washington, DC

- Game time:
- Game weather:
- Game attendance: 30,755
- Referee:

Scoring Drives:

- Washington – Moore 42 run (Masterson kick)
- Washington – FG Aldrich 17
- Pittsburgh – FG Niccolai 19
- Washington – Farkas 1 run (Aguirre kick)
- Washington – Carroll 25 interception (kick failed)

==== Game 8 (Sunday November 9, 1941): Philadelphia Eagles ====
	1	2	3	4	Total
Steelers	0	0	7	0	**7**
Eagles	7	0	0	0	**7**

at Shibe Park, Philadelphia, Pennsylvania

- Game time:
- Game weather:
- Game attendance: 15,601
- Referee:

Scoring Drives:

- Philadelphia – Castiglia 47 run (Basca kick)
- Pittsburgh – Jones 25 run (Sanders kick)

==== Game 9 (Sunday November 16, 1941): Brooklyn Dodgers ====
	1	2	3	4	Total
Dodgers	7	0	0	0	**7**
**Steelers**	0	7	0	7	**14**

at Forbes Field, Pittsburgh, Pennsylvania

- Game time:
- Game weather:
- Game attendance: 20,843
- Referee:

Scoring Drives:

- Brooklyn – Manders 3 run (Condit kick)
- Pittsburgh – Riffle 1 run (Niccolai kick)
- Pittsburgh – Jones 25 run (Niccolai kick)

==== Game 10 (Sunday November 23, 1941): Green Bay Packers ====
	1	2	3	4	Total
**Packers**	0	26	7	21	**54**
Steelers	7	0	0	0	**7**

at Forbes Field, Pittsburgh, Pennsylvania

- Game time:
- Game weather:
- Game attendance: 4,593
- Referee:

Scoring Drives:

- Pittsburgh – Hoague 1 run (Niccolai kick)
- Green Bay – Hinkle 3 run (kick failed)
- Green Bay – Hutson 8 pass from Isbell (kick failed)
- Green Bay – Hinkle 1 run (Hutson kick)
- Green Bay – Panell 26 fumble run (Hutson kick)
- Green Bay – Urban 12 pass from Canadeo (Adkins kick)
- Green Bay – Van Every 5 run (Adkins kick)
- Green Bay – Van Every 31 run (Adkins kick)
- Green Bay – Van Every 86 interception (Rohrig kick)

==== Game 11 (Sunday November 30, 1941): Brooklyn Dodgers ====
	1	2	3	4	Total
Steelers	0	7	0	0	**7**
**Dodgers**	14	7	7	7	**35**

at Ebbets Field, Brooklyn, New York

- Game time:
- Game weather:
- Game attendance: 12,336
- Referee:

Scoring Drives:

- Brooklyn – Condit 6 run (Condit kick)
- Brooklyn – Condit 43 run (Condit kick)
- Brooklyn – Kracum 1 run (McAdams kick)
- Pittsburgh – Jones 6 run (Niccolai kick)
- Brooklyn – Shetley 25 lateral from Schwartz after 32 pass from Parker (Condit kick)
- Brooklyn – Kracum 17 run (Peace kick)

== Roster ==
1941 Pittsburgh Steelers final roster
Backs: 34 Jay Arnold RB/CB/S; 10 Boyd Brumbaugh RB/S; 3 Al Donelli RB/CB; 20 Elmer Hackney FB/LB; 37 Joe Hoague FB/LB/P; 12 Art Jones RB/CB/P; 25 Coley McDonough RB/CB/P; 17 John Patrick RB/S; 23 Rocco Pirro RB/S; 22 Dick Riffle FB/LB/P; 76 Frank Zoppetti RB/CB	Linemen/Linebackers: 35 Dick Bassi G/DG; 21 Chuck Cherundolo C/LB; 24 Joe Coomer T/DT; 28 Ted Doyle T/DT; 46 Royal Kahler T/DT; 40 Carl Nery G/DG; 5 Armand Niccolai T/DT/K; 55 Jack Sanders G/DG/K; 44 John Schiechl C/LB; 48 Elbie Schultz G/DG/T/DT; 19 George Somers T/DT; 38 Don Williams G/DG; 36 John Woudenberg T/DT	Ends/Receivers: 32 Dick Dolly; 45 Walt Kichefski; 16 Elmer Kolberg; 30 Don Looney; 33 George Platukis; 59 Joe Wendlick; Rookies in italics

== Standings ==
NFL Eastern Division
	W	L	T	PCT	DIV	PF	PA	STK
New York Giants	8	3	0	.727	6–2	238	114	L1
Brooklyn Dodgers	7	4	0	.636	6–2	158	127	W2
Washington Redskins	6	5	0	.545	5–3	176	174	W1
Philadelphia Eagles	2	8	1	.200	1–6–1	119	218	L3
Pittsburgh Steelers	1	9	1	.100	1–6–1	103	276	L2

Note: Tie games were not officially counted in the standings until 1972.

NFL Western Division
	W	L	T	PCT	DIV	PF	PA	STK
Chicago Bears	10	1	0	.909	7–1	396	147	W5
Green Bay Packers	10	1	0	.909	7–1	258	120	W8
Detroit Lions	4	6	1	.400	3–4–1	121	195	W1
Chicago Cardinals	3	7	1	.300	1–6–1	127	197	L2
Cleveland Rams	2	9	0	.182	1–7	116	244	L9

Note: Tie games were not officially counted in the standings until 1972.
