= Tony Canadeo =

American football player (1919–2003)

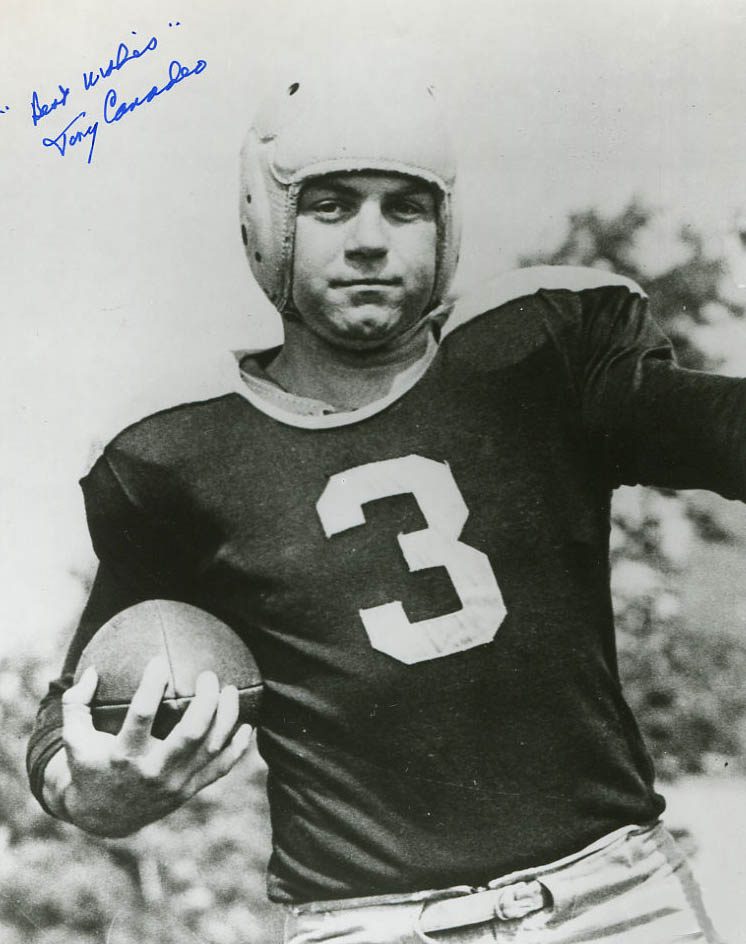
- Canadeo, c. 1949

No. 3
- Position: Back

Personal information
- Born: May 5, 1919; Chicago, Illinois, U.S.
- Died: November 29, 2003 (aged 84); Green Bay, Wisconsin, U.S.
- Listed height: 5 ft 11 in (1.80 m)
- Listed weight: 190 lb (86 kg)

Career information
- High school: Steinmetz College Prep (Chicago)
- College: Gonzaga (1938–1940)
- NFL draft: 1941: 9th round, 77th overall pick

Career history
- Green Bay Packers (1941–1944; 1946–1952)

Awards and highlights
- NFL champion (1944); 2× First-team All-Pro (1943, 1949); Second-team All-Pro (1948); NFL 1940s All-Decade Team; Green Bay Packers Hall of Fame; Green Bay Packers No. 3 retired; First-team Little All-American (1939); Second-team Little All-American (1940)

Career NFL statistics
- Rushing yards: 4,197
- Rushing touchdowns: 26
- Receptions: 69
- Receiving yards: 579
- Receiving touchdowns: 5
- Passing yards: 1,642
- TD–INT: 16–20
- Interceptions: 9
- Stats at Pro Football Reference
- Pro Football Hall of Fame

Anthony Robert Canadeo (May 5, 1919 – November 29, 2003) was an American professional football player who was a back in the National Football League (NFL) for the Green Bay Packers from 1941 to 1952, although he missed most of the 1944 season and the entire 1945 season while serving in the U.S. Army during World War II. Born and raised in Chicago, Illinois, he attended Gonzaga University in Spokane, Washington, played football for the Bulldogs, and earned the nickname "Gray Ghost of Gonzaga".

Canadeo was selected by the Packers in the 1941 NFL draft.

Before the war, Canadeo was a triple-threat halfback for the Packers, leading the team in rushing and passing in 1943. When he returned from the war in 1946, he served primarily as a running back, and in 1949 became the third player in NFL history to rush for 1,000 or more yards in a season.

He retired as the Packers' all-time rushing yards leader. Canadeo's number 3 was retired by the Packers immediately following his retirement as a player. He was inducted into the Pro Football Hall of Fame and Wisconsin Athletic Hall of Fame in 1974.

After his playing career, Canadeo worked as a color commentator for CBS television, covering Packers games with Ray Scott. He also was a long-time member of the Green Bay Packers, Inc. Board of Directors and Executive Committee, most notably during the Vince Lombardi era.

Canadeo died in 2003 at the age of 84.

== Early life and college ==
Born and raised in Chicago, Illinois, Canadeo attended Charles P. Steinmetz Academic Centre, formerly known as Steinmetz High School, a public four-year high school located in the Belmont Cragin neighborhood.

Canadeo played college football at Gonzaga University in Spokane, Washington, where he was first known as the "Gray Ghost of Gonzaga," due to his prematurely graying hair. Of Italian ancestry, he was named an "outstanding Italian American athlete" for 1939 by the National Italian American Civic League. Others honored included New York Yankees' center fielder Joe DiMaggio and golfer Gene Sarazen.

As a senior in 1940, Canadeo starred in Gonzaga's 13–7 upset win over the heavily favored University of Detroit in November. The football program was dropped after 1941, and he was its last alumnus to play pro football. He also boxed for the Bulldogs during his senior year, and was named team captain.

== Professional career ==
Canadeo was not particularly fast or elusive, and was smaller than average NFL players even for his time. However, he was a determined and tenacious player. Contemporary Jim Benton called him one of the three toughest players to tackle, alongside Frank Sinkwich and Steve Van Buren. He was also versatile, playing multiple positions on offense, defense, and special teams. This versatility caused Packers head coach Curly Lambeau to take notice, despite Gonzaga being a smaller college.

=== Pre-war ===
Canadeo was selected by the Packers in the ninth round with the 77th overall pick of the 1941 NFL draft, held in December 1940. By August 13, Canadeo was one of only seven players to sign a contract with the team out of the twenty Green Bay had drafted. Most of the remaining unsigned players either joined the military or chose not to play professional football. Lambeau looked to use Canadeo to bolster a backfield that included aging stars Clarke Hinkle and Arnie Herber. Before the season, Canadeo competed with Herber and Cecil Isbell for the starting quarterback role. He starred in an exhibition game against the New York Giants, as he and Frank Balasz led a scoring march through a muddy field in the third quarter.

Herber was waived by the Packers at the end of training camp and Isbell became the Packers' quarterback, while Canadeo had a reserve role in the offense as a rookie in 1941. That season, he played in the first ever NFL playoff game (unscheduled divisional tiebreaker), in which he picked up seven yards on five carries as the Packers lost 33–14 to the eventual NFL champion Chicago Bears. As a backup to Isbell in 1942, Canadeo passed for 310 yards and rushed for 272 more. One of his three touchdown passes was a toss to receiver Don Hutson from one inch away from the goal line. When scolded by one of his coaches for passing so close to the goal line, Canadeo quipped, "Cecil Isbell tossed a four-incher not long ago for a record and I wanted to beat it – you don't get an opportunity like that very often."

In 1943, Isbell quit his playing career to coach for Purdue University, his alma mater. Canadeo took over for Isbell at tailback and led the Packers that season in both rushing and passing yards. He gained 489 yards and three touchdowns on 94 carries, had 875 passing yards and nine touchdowns, and scored two touchdowns as a receiver. He and Harry Clarke of the Bears battled for the rushing title late in the season, but Canadeo ultimately finished fifth in the league in yardage. After the season, he was named a first-team All-Pro by the Associated Press.

=== World War II ===
Canadeo's honorable discharge from the navy in August 1943 had allowed him to play for the Packers that season. However, he played in only three games during the 1944 season, missing the team's victory in the NFL Championship Game due to service in World War II. During the war, he first served in the U.S. Navy, then joined the U.S. Army and missed all of the 1945 season.

=== Post-war ===
Canadeo returned in 1946, and in February he and several other Packers players received offers to play in the All-America Football Conference, a rival league to the NFL. He turned down the offer and during the season became Green Bay's primary running back. He remained in that position for the next four seasons while still occasionally passing the ball. He led the Packers in rushing yards in each of those four seasons. In 1948, he was named a second-team All-Pro by United Press and Pro Football Illustrated.

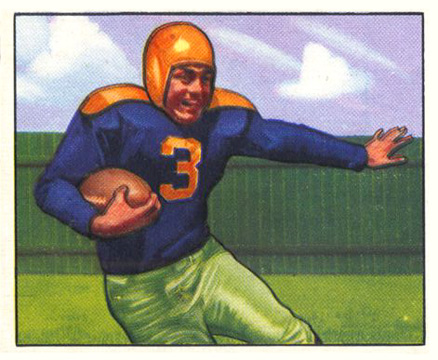
Canadeo depicted on a Bowman trading card in 1950

Canadeo became the first Packer and the third ever in the NFL to rush for 1,000 yards in a season when he rushed for 1,052 yards in 1949. However, he failed to win the rushing title, as Steve Van Buren of the Eagles claimed it with a record 1,146 yards. The two running backs ran a close race for the rushing yards lead throughout the season, with Canadeo leading for much of it. With three games to play, Canadeo was ahead of Van Buren 831 yards to 792. Van Buren's 205 yards against the Steelers the next game to put him ahead for good. Despite Canadeo's output the Packers struggled to a 2–10 (.167) record, and founder Lambeau resigned as head coach.

Sharing running back duties with Billy Grimes in 1950 under new head coach Gene Ronzani, Canadeo was fourth on the team in rushing yards, but scored four touchdowns. Grimes, who led the team in rushing yards and touchdowns, was quick to give Canadeo credit. "Tony Canadeo is one of the toughest players I ever played with," he said. "He did a lot of blocking for me, and that helped me a lot."

Canadeo's production and carries dropped over his final two seasons, but in 1951 he caught a career-high 22 passes. He retired after the 1952 season, having carried 1,025 times for 4,197 yards and 26 touchdowns in his career. His carries and rushing yards totals were Packers records at the time. He also passed for 1,642 yards and sixteen touchdowns, and caught 69 passes for 579 yards and five more scores. In addition to his accomplishments on offense, Canadeo recorded nine career interceptions on defense, and before the war was the team's primary punter.

== Career statistics ==
Note: Only offensive statistics shown below. Canadeo also served as a kicker, punter, kick returner, punt returner, and defensive back and thus recorded statistics on defense and special teams.

=== Regular season ===
Year	Team	Games		Passing							Rushing					Receiving				
Year	Team	GP	GS	Att	Comp	Pct	Yards	TD	Int	Rate	Att	Yds	Avg	TD	Lng	Rec	Yds	Avg	TD	Lng
1941	GB	9	4	16	4	25.0	54	2	0	80.7	43	137	3.2	3	16	0	0	0	0	0
1942	GB	11	5	59	24	40.7	310	3	4	46.6	89	272	3.1	3	50	10	66	6.6	0	15
1943	GB	10	8	129	56	43.4	875	9	12	51.0	94	489	5.2	3	35	3	31	10.3	2	15
1944	GB	3	0	20	9	45.0	89	0	0	58.1	31	149	4.8	0	34	1	12	12.0	0	12
1945	GB	0	0	Did not play due to service in World War II																
1946	GB	11	5	27	7	25.9	189	1	3	29.0	122	476	3.9	0	27	2	25	12.5	0	15
1947	GB	12	6	8	3	37.5	101	1	1	85.4	103	464	4.5	2	35	0	0	0	0	0
1948	GB	12	9	8	2	25.0	24	0	0	39.6	123	589	4.8	4	49	9	81	9.0	0	32
1949	GB	12	12	0	0	0.0	0	0	0	0	208	1,052	5.1	4	54	3	-2	-0.7	0	3
1950	GB	12	7	0	0	0.0	0	0	0	0	93	247	2.7	4	15	10	54	5.4	0	20
1951	GB	12	12	0	0	0.0	0	0	0	0	54	131	2.4	1	15	22	226	10.3	2	46
1952	GB	12	12	1	0	0.0	0	0	0	39.6	65	191	2.9	2	35	9	86	9.6	1	21
Total		116	80	268	105	39.2	1,642	16	20	49.1	1,025	4,197	4.1	26	54	69	579	8.4	5	46
Source: Pro-Football-Reference.com

=== Playoffs ===
Year	Team	Games		Passing							Rushing					Receiving				
Year	Team	GP	GS	Att	Comp	Pct	Yards	TD	Int	Rate	Att	Yds	Avg	TD	Lng	Rec	Yds	Avg	TD	Lng
1941	GB	1	0	2	1	50.0	40	0	1	56.2	5	7	1.4	0	16	0	0	0	0	0
Total		1	0	2	1	50.0	40	0	1	56.2	5	7	1.4	0	16	0	0	0	0	0
Source: Pro-Football-Reference.com

== Legacy and later life ==
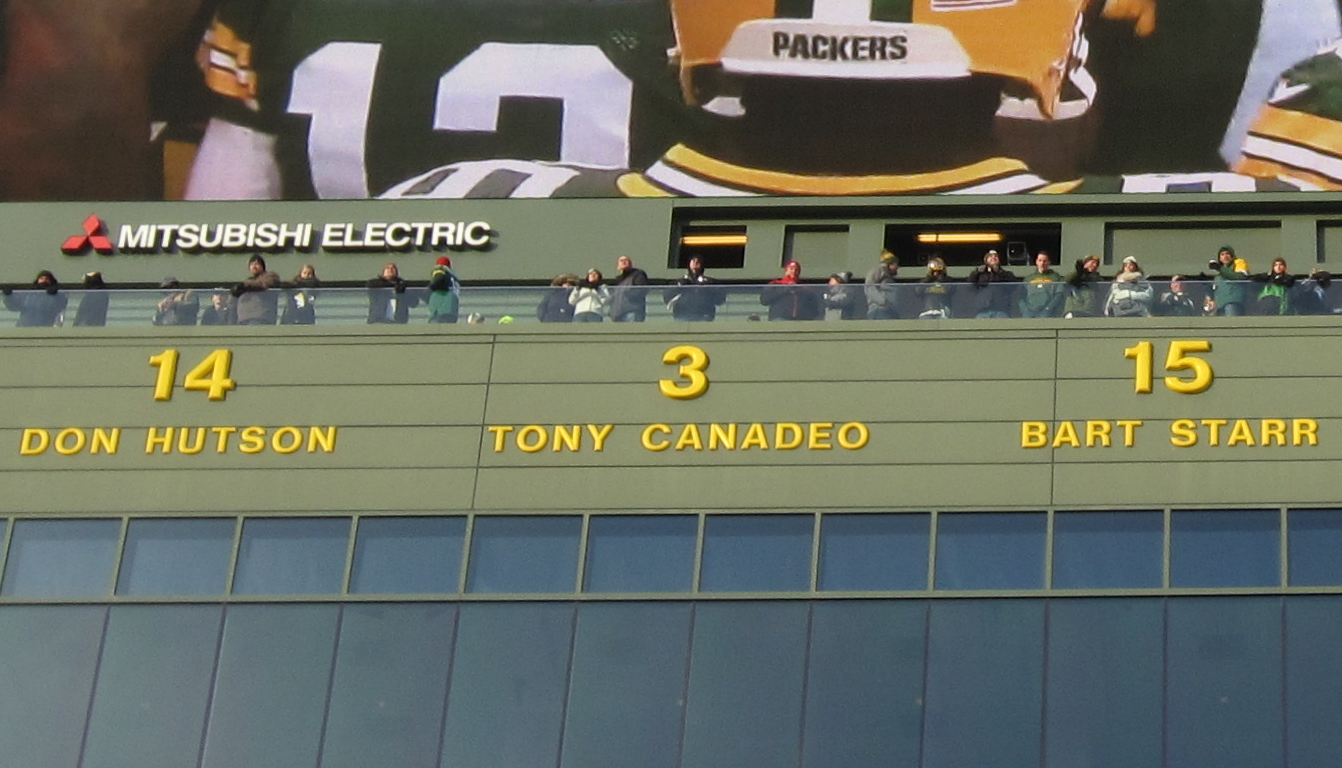
Canadeo's retired number 3 displayed at Lambeau Field

Sportswriter Tom Silverstein of the Milwaukee Journal Sentinel said of Canadeo in 2003, "Of all the players, coaches, and executives who left an imprint on the Packers organization, none did it for longer than the affable Canadeo." Canadeo is one of six Green Bay Packers to have his number retired by the team. His number (3) was retired immediately after he left the NFL in 1952, preceded by Don Hutson (14) in 1951 and followed by Bart Starr (15) in 1973, Ray Nitschke (66) in 1983, Reggie White (92) in 2005, and Brett Favre (4) in 2015. In 1961, kicker Ben Agajanian, who played only three games for the Packers, wore Canadeo's No. 3 after being assigned it by mistake.

The Helms Athletic Foundation named Canadeo to its football hall of fame in 1957. He joined former teammates Clarke Hinkle, Arnie Herber, and Don Hutson. In 1973, he was inducted into the Green Bay Packers Hall of Fame.

Canadeo was elected to the Wisconsin Athletic Hall of Fame in 1974, which he described as a dream come true. He was inducted into the Pro Football Hall of Fame the same year, the first player from Gonzaga to be so honored, edging Ray Flaherty by two years. He remains the only player from the 1941 draft class inducted into the Pro Football Hall of Fame. Two years before his induction in Canton, Canadeo received a kidney transplant, which was donated by his son Robert. Robert played football for the University of Colorado in the 1960s.

After his playing career, Canadeo continued his association with the Packers as a television color analyst—calling the team's games with Ray Scott on CBS in the 1960s—and a member of the organization's executive committee. He remained listed as one of the directors emeritus until his death in 2003. He worked as a sales representative in Green Bay for Whittaker Metals during the 1970s. Canadeo and his wife, Ruth, married in 1943 during the football season. The Packers lost the following game, causing coach Lambeau to say there would never be another wedding during the season. Canadeo and Ruth remained together until his death in Green Bay in 2003 at the age of 84.
