= 1941 Cleveland Rams season =

NFL team season

- Head coach: Earl "Dutch" Clark
- Home stadium: Cleveland Municipal Stadium

Results
- Record: 2–9
- Division place: 5th NFL Western
- Playoffs: Did not qualify

The 1941 Cleveland Rams season was the team's fifth year with the National Football League and the sixth season in Cleveland.

== Schedule ==
| Game | Date | Opponent | Result | Record | Venue | Attendance | Recap | Sources |
|---|---|---|---|---|---|---|---|---|
| 1 | September 7 | Pittsburgh Steelers | **W** 17–14 | 1–0 | Rubber Bowl | 23,720 | Recap | |
| 2 | September 16 | at **Chicago Cardinals** | **W** 10–6 | 2–0 | Comiskey Park | 15,000 | Recap | |
| 3 | September 21 | at **Green Bay Packers** | **L** 7–24 | 2–1 | Wisconsin State Fair Park | 20,000 | Recap | |
| — | Bye | | | | | | | |
| 4 | October 5 | **Chicago Bears** | **L** 21–48 | 2–2 | Cleveland Municipal Stadium | 23,850 | Recap | |
| 5 | October 12 | at **Detroit Lions** | **L** 7–17 | 2–3 | Briggs Stadium | 26,841 | Recap | |
| 6 | October 19 | **Green Bay Packers** | **L** 14–17 | 2–4 | Cleveland Municipal Stadium | 13,086 | Recap | |
| 7 | October 26 | at Washington Redskins | **L** 13–17 | 2–5 | Griffith Stadium | 32,820 | Recap | |
| 8 | November 2 | **Detroit Lions** | **L** 0–14 | 2–6 | Cleveland Municipal Stadium | 10,554 | Recap | |
| 9 | November 9 | at **Chicago Bears** | **L** 13–31 | 2–7 | Wrigley Field | 18,102 | Recap | |
| 10 | November 16 | at New York Giants | **L** 14–49 | 2–8 | Polo Grounds | 32,740 | Recap | |
| 11 | November 23 | **Chicago Cardinals** | **L** 0–7 | 2–9 | Cleveland Municipal Stadium | 5,000 | Recap | |
Note: Intra-division opponents are in **bold** text. • September 7: League opener in Akron.

== Roster ==
1941 Cleveland Rams final roster
| Backs: 3 Corby Davis RB/S; 14 Johnny Drake FB/LB; 16 Owen Goodnight RB/CB/P; 32 Parker Hall RB/CB/P; 38 Len Janiak FB/LB; 24 Dante Magnani RB/CB; 9 Frank Maher RB/CB; 4 George Morris RB/CB; 27 Rudy Mucha RB/S/P; 25 Charley Seabright RB/S; 5 Marty Slovak RB/CB; 10 Gaylon Smith RB/CB/S | Linemen/Linebackers: 34 Chet Adams T/DT/K; 18 Graham Armstrong T/DT; 21 Boyd Clay T/DT; 37 Red Conkright C/LB; 20 Moose Dunstan T/DT; 23 Jack Gregory G/DG; 15 Jack Haman C/LB; 1 Del Lyman T/DT; 11 Riley Matheson G/DG; 30 Barney McGarry G/DG; 17 Hank Rockwell G/DG; 6 Bill Rieth C/G/DG; 33 Milt Simington G/T/DG/DT; 26 Wilfred Thorpe G/DG | Ends/Receivers: 31 Chuck Hanneman; 28 Red Hickey; 19 Paul McDonough; 2 Maury Patt; 8 Ray Prochaska; 12 Johnny Wilson; Reserve: Jim Gillette RB/CB (Military); rookies in italics |

== Standings ==
Program for the September 21st game against the Green Bay Packers.

NFL Western Division
| | W | L | T | PCT | DIV | PF | PA | STK |
|---|---|---|---|---|---|---|---|---|
| Chicago Bears | 10 | 1 | 0 | .909 | 7–1 | 396 | 147 | W5 |
| Green Bay Packers | 10 | 1 | 0 | .909 | 7–1 | 258 | 120 | W8 |
| Detroit Lions | 4 | 6 | 1 | .400 | 3–4–1 | 121 | 195 | W1 |
| Chicago Cardinals | 3 | 7 | 1 | .300 | 1–6–1 | 127 | 197 | L2 |
| Cleveland Rams | 2 | 9 | 0 | .182 | 1–7 | 116 | 244 | L9 |

Note: Tie games were not officially counted in the standings until 1972.

NFL Eastern Division
| | W | L | T | PCT | DIV | PF | PA | STK |
|---|---|---|---|---|---|---|---|---|
| New York Giants | 8 | 3 | 0 | .727 | 6–2 | 238 | 114 | L1 |
| Brooklyn Dodgers | 7 | 4 | 0 | .636 | 6–2 | 158 | 127 | W2 |
| Washington Redskins | 6 | 5 | 0 | .545 | 5–3 | 176 | 174 | W1 |
| Philadelphia Eagles | 2 | 8 | 1 | .200 | 1–6–1 | 119 | 218 | L3 |
| Pittsburgh Steelers | 1 | 9 | 1 | .100 | 1–6–1 | 103 | 276 | L2 |

Note: Tie games were not officially counted in the standings until 1972.
