= 1941 Green Bay Packers season =

NFL team season

- Head coach: Curly Lambeau
- Home stadium: City Stadium; Wisconsin State Fair Park

Results
- Record: 10–1
- Division place: 1st NFL Western
- Playoffs: Lost Divisional Playoff (at Bears) 14–33

The 1941 Green Bay Packers season was their 23rd season overall and their 21st season in the National Football League. The team finished with a 10–1 record under founder and head coach Curly Lambeau, earning a tie for first place in the Western Conference with the defending league champion Chicago Bears. They split their season series, each winning on the road, and met in a playoff in Chicago to determine who would host the New York Giants in the NFL Championship Game. But the Packers lost 33–14 in the first post-season game ever played between the archrivals; the next came over 69 years later, in the NFC Championship game on January 22, 2011.

== Offseason ==
=== NFL draft ===
Round	Pick	Player	Position	School/club team
1	7	George Paskvan	Back	Wisconsin
3	21	Bob Paffrath	Back	Minnesota
5	37	Ed Frutig	End	Michigan
6	46	Herm Rohrig	Defensive back	Nebraska
7	57	Bill Telesmanic	End	San Francisco
8	66	Bill Kuusisto	Guard	Minnesota
9	77	Tony Canadeo	Halfback	Gonzaga
10	86	Mike Byelene	Back	Purdue
11	97	Paul Heimenz	Center	Northwestern
12	106	Mike Enich	Tackle	Iowa
13	117	Ed Heffernan	Back	St. Mary's (CA)
14	126	Del Lyman	Tackle	UCLA
15	137	Johnny Frieberger	End	Arkansas
16	146	Ernie Pannell	Tackle	Texas A&M
17	157	Bob Saggau	Back	Notre Dame
18	166	Helge Pukema	Guard	Minnesota
19	177	Bob Hayes	End	Toledo
20	186	Jimmy Strausbaugh	Back	Ohio State
21	192	Joe Bailey	Center	Kentucky
22	196	Bruno Malinowski	Back	Holy Cross

- Green indicates a future Pro Football Hall of Fame inductee

== Regular season ==
=== Schedule ===
Game	Date	Opponent	Result	Record	Venue	Attendance	Recap	Sources
1	September 14	**Detroit Lions**	**W** 23–0	1–0	City Stadium	16,734	Recap	
2	September 21	**Cleveland Rams**	**W** 24–7	2–0	Wisconsin State Fair Park	18,463	Recap	
3	September 28	**Chicago Bears**	**L** 17–25	2–1	City Stadium	24,876	Recap	
4	October 5	**Chicago Cardinals**	**W** 14–13	3–1	Wisconsin State Fair Park	~10,000	Recap	
5	October 12	Brooklyn Dodgers	**W** 30–7	4–1	Wisconsin State Fair Park	15,621	Recap	
6	October 19	at **Cleveland Rams**	**W** 17–14	5–1	Cleveland Municipal Stadium	13,086	Recap	
7	October 26	at **Detroit Lions**	**W** 24–7	6–1	Briggs Stadium	30,269	Recap	
8	November 2	at **Chicago Bears**	**W** 16–14	7–1	Wrigley Field	46,484	Recap	
—	Bye							
9	November 16	**Chicago Cardinals**	**W** 17–9	8–1	City Stadium	15,495	Recap	
10	November 23	at Pittsburgh Steelers	**W** 54–7	9–1	Forbes Field	15,202	Recap	
11	November 30	at Washington Redskins	**W** 22–17	10–1	Griffith Stadium	35,594	Recap	
Note: Intra-division opponents are in **bold** text.

=== Playoffs ===
Round	Date	Opponent	Result	Record	Venue	Attendance	Recap	Sources
Western Division Playoff	December 14	at Chicago Bears	**L** 14–33	0–1	Wrigley Field	43,425	Recap	

== Roster ==
1941 Green Bay Packers final roster
Backs: 55 Bob Adkins RB/S/K; 16 Lou Brock RB/CB; 52 Larry Buhler RB/S; 3 Tony Canadeo RB/CB/P; 54 Larry Craig RB/S; 30 Clarke Hinkle FB/LB/K/P; 17 Cecil Isbell RB/CB/P; 7 Eddie Jankowski FB/LB; 24 Joe Laws RB/CB; 68 George Paskvan FB/LB; 8 Herm Rohrig RB/CB/P; 42 Andy Uram RB/CB; 36 Hal Van Every RB/CB/P	Linemen/Linebackers: 29 Charley Brock C/LB; 43 Buckets Goldenberg G/DG; 56 Tom Greenfield C/LB; 64 Howard Johnson G/DG; 45 Bill Kuusisto G/DG; 40 Bill Lee T/DT; 46 Russ Letlow G/DG; 37 Lee McLaughlin G/DG; 22 Ernie Pannell T/DT; 44 Baby Ray T/DT; 60 Charlie Schultz T/DT; 66 George Svendsen C/LB; 21 Pete Tinsley G/DG	Ends/Receivers: 51 Ed Frutig; 14 Don Hutson K; 48 Harry Jacunski; 50 Bill Johnson; 19 Carl Mulleneaux; 5 Ray Riddick; 23 Alex Urban; Rookies in italics

== Standings ==
Game program for the September 21 contest against the Cleveland Rams.

NFL Western Division
	W	L	T	PCT	DIV	PF	PA	STK
Chicago Bears	10	1	0	.909	7–1	396	147	W5
Green Bay Packers	10	1	0	.909	7–1	258	120	W8
Detroit Lions	4	6	1	.400	3–4–1	121	195	W1
Chicago Cardinals	3	7	1	.300	1–6–1	127	197	L2
Cleveland Rams	2	9	0	.182	1–7	116	244	L9

Note: Tie games were not officially counted in the standings until 1972.

== Awards and records ==
- Don Hutson, NFL receiving leader, 74 receptions
- Cecil Isbell, NFL leader, passing yards (1,479)

== Milestones ==
- Don Hutson, 1,000 yard receiving season (1,211 yards)
