= 1941 Washington Redskins season =

NFL team season

- Owner: George Preston Marshall
- General manager: Jack Espey
- Head coach: Ray Flaherty
- Home stadium: Griffith Stadium

Results
- Record: 6–5
- Division place: 3rd NFL Eastern
- Playoffs: Did not qualify

The 1941 Washington Redskins season was the franchise's 10th season in the National Football League (NFL) and their 5th in Washington, D.C. The team failed to improve on their 9–2 record from 1940, finishing at 6–5 and missed the playoffs.

The final game of the season, a home game against the Eagles, occurred on Sunday, December 7, starting just twelve minutes after the start of the attack on Pearl Harbor and approximately twenty minutes before the news was released by White House Press Secretary Stephen Early. Announcements were made recalling military, government and diplomatic personnel to their offices starting midway through the first quarter and continued throughout the game. By the end of the game, despite no official announcement being made there, most press and spectators had left, either out of curiosity or because of being called away. When questioned, Washington owner George Preston Marshall stated that he did not make the announcement because, "I didn't want to divert the fans' attention from the game."

== Schedule ==
Game	Date	Opponent	Result	Record	Venue	Attendance	Recap	Sources
1	September 28	**New York Giants**	**L** 10–17	0–1	Griffith Stadium	35,677	Recap	
2	October 5	**Brooklyn Dodgers**	**W** 3–0	1–1	Griffith Stadium	32,642	Recap	
3	October 12	at **Pittsburgh Steelers**	**W** 24–20	2–1	Forbes Field	18,733	Recap	
4	October 19	at **Philadelphia Eagles**	**W** 21–17	3–1	Shibe Park	19,071	Recap	
5	October 26	Cleveland Rams	**W** 17–13	4–1	Griffith Stadium	32,820	Recap	
6	November 2	**Pittsburgh Steelers**	**W** 23–3	5–1	Griffith Stadium	30,755	Recap	
7	November 9	at **Brooklyn Dodgers**	**L** 7–13	5–2	Ebbets Field	31,713	Recap	
8	November 16	at Chicago Bears	**L** 21–35	5–3	Wrigley Field	30,095	Recap	
9	November 23	at **New York Giants**	**L** 13–20	5–4	Polo Grounds	49,317	Recap	
10	November 30	Green Bay Packers	**L** 17–22	5–5	Griffith Stadium	35,594	Recap	
11	December 7	**Philadelphia Eagles**	**W** 20–14	6-5	Griffith Stadium	27,102	Recap	
Note: Intra-division opponents are in **bold** text.

== Roster ==
1941 Washington Redskins final roster
Backs: 33 Sammy Baugh RB/CB/P; 25 Ken Dow LB/FB; 44 Andy Farkas FB/LB; 30 Frank Filchock RB/CB; 46 Lee Gentry FB/LB; 11 Cecil Hare RB/S; 42 Ray Hare RB/CB; 13 Ed Justice RB/CB; 14 Al Krueger RB/CB; 35 Wilbur Moore RB/CB; 20 Bob Seymour RB/CB; 41 Dick Todd FB/LB/P; 22 Roy Zimmerman RB/CB/P	Linemen/Linebackers: 38 Ki Aldrich C/LB/K; 15 Jim Barber T/DT; 45 Ed Beinor T/DT; 26 Vic Carroll C/LB; 17 Fred Davis T/DT; 21 Dick Farman G/DG; 51 Clyde Shugart G/DG; 16 Steve Slivinski G/DG; 47 George Smith C/LB; 39 Clem Stralka G/DG; 27 Jim Stuart G/DG/T/DT; 18 Bob Titchenal C/LB; 36 Willie Wilkin T/DT; 37 Bill Young T/DT	Ends/Receivers: 19 Joe Aguirre K; 43 Ed Cifers; 31 Frank Clair; 28 Bob Masterson K; 32 Bob McChesney; 40 Wayne Millner; rookies in italics

== Standings ==
NFL Eastern Division
	W	L	T	PCT	DIV	PF	PA	STK
New York Giants	8	3	0	.727	6–2	238	114	L1
Brooklyn Dodgers	7	4	0	.636	6–2	158	127	W2
Washington Redskins	6	5	0	.545	5–3	176	174	W1
Philadelphia Eagles	2	8	1	.200	1–6–1	119	218	L3
Pittsburgh Steelers	1	9	1	.100	1–6–1	103	276	L2

Note: Tie games were not officially counted in the standings until 1972.
