= 1941 Chicago Cardinals season =

American football team season

- Head coach: Jimmy Conzelman
- Home stadium: Comiskey Park

Results
- Record: 3–7–1
- Division place: 4th NFL Western
- Playoffs: Did not qualify

The 1941 Chicago Cardinals season was the 22nd season the team was in the league. The team improved on their previous output of 2–7–2, winning three games. They failed to qualify for the playoffs for the 16th consecutive season.

The last game of the season, a home game against the defending (and eventual 1941) champion Chicago Bears, was one of three NFL games played on Sunday, December 7, 1941, as the attack on Pearl Harbor happened. As was the case at the Polo Grounds (site of the Brooklyn-New York game) and Griffith Stadium (site of the Eagles-Redskins game), no official announcement was made, though newsboys were hawking extras outside the stadium as the nearly 19,000 fans at the game exited Comiskey Park.

== Schedule ==
Game	Date	Opponent	Result	Record	Venue	Attendance	Recap	Sources
1	September 16	**Cleveland Rams**	**L** 6–10	0–1	Comiskey Park	15,000	Recap	
—	Bye							
2	September 27	**Detroit Lions**	**T** 14–14	0–1–1	Comiskey Park	17,458	Recap	
3	October 5	at **Green Bay Packers**	**L** 13–14	0–2–1	State Fair Park	10,000	Recap	
4	October 12	at **Chicago Bears**	**L** 7–53	0–3–1	Wrigley Field	34,668	Recap	
5	October 19	at Brooklyn Dodgers	**W** 20–6	1–3–1	Ebbets Field	12,054	Recap	
6	October 26	at Philadelphia Eagles	**L** 14–21	1–4–1	Shibe Park	12,683	Recap	
7	November 2	at New York Giants	**W** 10–7	2–4–1	Polo Grounds	29,289	Recap	
—	Bye							
8	November 16	at **Green Bay Packers**	**L** 9–17	2–5–1	City Stadium	15,495	Recap	
9	November 23	at **Cleveland Rams**	**W** 7–0	3–5–1	Cleveland Stadium	5,000	Recap	
10	November 30	at **Detroit Lions**	**L** 3–21	3–6–1	Briggs Stadium	17,051	Recap	
11	December 7	**Chicago Bears**	**L** 24–34	3–7–1	Comiskey Park	18,879	Recap	
Note: Intra-division opponents are in **bold** text. • September 27: Saturday night game

== Roster ==
1941 Chicago Cardinals final roster
Backs: 44 Frank Balazs FB/LB/P; 23 Johnny Clement RB/CB; 89 Marshall Goldberg FB/LB; 77 Johnny Hall RB/CB; 21 Bert Johnson RB/S; 98 Ray Mallouf RB/CB/P; 29 Johnny Martin RB/CB/P; 33 Hugh McCullough RB/CB; 48 Bob Morrow FB/LB; 15 Buddy Parker RB/S; 73 Fred Vanzo RB/S	Linemen/Linebackers: 75 Ray Apolskis C/LB; 46 Al Babartsky T/DT; 22 Conway Baker T/DT; 97 Ray Busler T/DT; 30 Andy Chisick C/LB; 57 Bill Davis T/DT; 49 Frank Huffman G/DG; 88 Joe Kuharich G/DG; 24 John Kuzman T/DT; 27 Joe Lokanc G/DG; 25 Bill Murphy G/DG; 66 Milt Popovich G/DG; 36 Fred Shook C/LB; 35 Art White G/DG	Ends/Receivers: 54 Al Coppage; 32 Bill Daddio K; 7 Billy Dewell; 28 Dick Evans; 51 Pop Ivy; Reserve: Gil Duggan T/DT (DNR); rookies in italics

== Standings ==
NFL Western Division
	W	L	T	PCT	DIV	PF	PA	STK
Chicago Bears	10	1	0	.909	7–1	396	147	W5
Green Bay Packers	10	1	0	.909	7–1	258	120	W8
Detroit Lions	4	6	1	.400	3–4–1	121	195	W1
Chicago Cardinals	3	7	1	.300	1–6–1	127	197	L2
Cleveland Rams	2	9	0	.182	1–7	116	244	L9

Note: Tie games were not officially counted in the standings until 1972.
