= Don Vosberg =

American football player (1919–1997)

No. 49
- Positions: End, defensive end

Personal information
- Born: October 3, 1919; Dubuque, Iowa, U.S.
- Died: June 21, 1997 (aged 77); Tucson, Arizona, U.S.
- Listed height: 6 ft 3 in (1.91 m)
- Listed weight: 196 lb (89 kg)

Career information
- High school: Dubuque
- College: Marquette
- NFL draft: 1941: 7th round, 56th overall pick

Career history
- New York Giants (1941)

Career NFL statistics
- Games played: 7
- Stats at Pro Football Reference

Donald Theodore Vosberg (October 3, 1919 – June 21, 1997) was an American professional football player in the National Football League (NFL). He was drafted 56th overall in the seventh round of the 1941 NFL draft by the New York Giants and played that season with the team.

== See also ==
- List of NCAA major college football yearly receiving leaders
