= Johnny Knolla =

American football player (1919–1992)

- Knolla, 1947

No. 33, 35
- Position: Halfback

Personal information
- Born: March 19, 1919; Chicago, Illinois, U.S.
- Died: January 12, 1992 (aged 72); Wichita, Kansas, U.S.
- Listed height: 5 ft 10 in (1.78 m)
- Listed weight: 180 lb (82 kg)

Career information
- High school: Harrisburg (Harrisburg, Illinois)
- College: Creighton
- NFL draft: 1941: 3rd round, 18th overall pick

Career history
- Chicago Cardinals (1942, 1945)

Career NFL statistics
- Rushing yards: 79
- Rushing average: 2.6
- Receptions: 9
- Receiving yards: 63
- Stats at Pro Football Reference

John Alexander "Slingshot" Knolla (March 19, 1919 – January 12, 1992) was a National Football League (NFL) player for the Chicago Cardinals. He played college football for Creighton University from 1938 to 1940.

== Early life ==
Knolla was born in 1919 in Chicago.

== Creighton ==
Knolla played on Creighton's freshman football team in 1937.

Knolla developed into a strong passer and rusher in 1938 and 1939. In 1939, he ranked among the leading passers and rushers in the country.

In 1940, he led all NCAA major college players with 1,420 yards of total offense, outpacing Tom Harmon by 52 yards and was named a "Little All American".

== Professional football ==
Knolla was drafted in the third round of the 1941 NFL draft by the Pittsburgh Steelers. He also played professional football in the NFL for the Cardinals in 1942 and 1945. He appeared in 18 NFL games and gained 138 kickoff return yards, 107 punt return yards, 79 rushing yards, and 63 receiving yards.

== Later life ==
Knolla later became a teacher, high school football coach and athletic director and then a successful businessman. In 12 non-contiguous seasons at Kapaun Mount Carmel High School, Knolla's teams went 56–43–3, including a 9–0 season and a City League championship in 1963. In 1975 he was inducted into the Nebraska Football Hall of Fame. In 1978 he was named to the Creighton Athletics Hall of Fame.

== See also ==
- List of NCAA major college football yearly total offense leaders
