= 1941 Brooklyn Dodgers (NFL) season =

National Football League team season

1941 Brooklyn Dodgers season
- Owner: Dan Topping
- Head coach: Jock Sutherland
- Home stadium: Ebbets Field

Results
- Record: 7–4
- Division place: 2nd NFL Eastern
- Playoffs: Did not qualify

The 1941 Brooklyn Dodgers season marked the franchise's 12th year in the National Football League (NFL). The team failed to improve on their previous season's output of 8–3, winning only seven games. They failed to qualify for the playoffs for the 10th consecutive season.

== Schedule ==
Game	Date	Opponent	Result	Record	Venue	Attendance	Recap	Sources
1	September 21	Detroit Lions	**W** 14–7	1–0	Ebbets Field	19,269	Recap	
2	September 27	at **Philadelphia Eagles**	**W** 24–13	2–0	Shibe Park	16,341	Recap	
3	October 5	at **Washington Redskins**	**L** 0–3	2–1	Griffith Stadium	32,642	Recap	
4	October 12	at Green Bay Packers	**L** 7–30	2–2	State Fair Park	15,621	Recap	
5	October 19	Chicago Cardinals	**L** 6–20	2–3	Ebbets Field	12,054	Recap	
6	October 26	**New York Giants**	**W** 16–13	3–3	Ebbets Field	28,675	Recap	
7	November 2	**Philadelphia Eagles**	**W** 15–6	4–3	Ebbets Field	15,899	Recap	
8	November 9	**Washington Redskins**	**W** 13–7	5–3	Ebbets Field	31,713	Recap	
9	November 16	at **Pittsburgh Steelers**	**L** 7–14	5–4	Forbes Field	20,843	Recap	
—	Bye							
10	November 30	**Pittsburgh Steelers**	**W** 35–7	6–4	Ebbets Field	12,336	Recap	
11	December 7	at **New York Giants**	**W** 21–7	7–4	Polo Grounds	55,051	Recap	
Note: Intra-division opponents are in **bold** text.

== Roster ==
1941 Brooklyn Dodgers final roster
Backs: 66 Wendell Butcher RB/S; 35 Merl Condit RB/CB/K; 1 Thurmon Jones FB/LB; 20 Ben Kish RB/S; 10 George Kracum FB/LB; 4 Bill Leckonby RB/CB/P; 9 Pug Manders FB/LB; 6 Dean McAdams RB/CB/K/P; 7 Ace Parker RB/CB/P; 2 Larry Peace RB/CB; 30 Rhoten Shetley RB/S; 11 Leo Stasica RB/CB	Linemen/Linebackers: 33 Warren Alfson G/DG; 5 Ray Frick C/LB; 21 Andy Fronczek T/DT; 17 Mike Jurich T/DT; 25 Bruiser Kinard T/DT/K; 27 George Kinard G/DG; 24 Joe Koons C/LB; 19 Frank Kristufek T/DT; 31 Steve Petro G/DG; 14 Tom Robertson C/LB; 28 Jim Sivell G/DG; 18 Bud Svendsen C/LB; 15 Si Titus C/LB	Ends/Receivers: 22 Bill Bailey; 13 Herman Hodges; 32 Dave Parker; 26 Eddie Rucinski; 99 Perry Schwartz; 23 Don Wemple; Reserve: -- Chuck Drulis G/DG (DNR); 29 Walt Merrill T/DT; Rookies in italics

== Standings ==
NFL Eastern Division
	W	L	T	PCT	DIV	PF	PA	STK
New York Giants	8	3	0	.727	6–2	238	114	L1
Brooklyn Dodgers	7	4	0	.636	6–2	158	127	W2
Washington Redskins	6	5	0	.545	5–3	176	174	W1
Philadelphia Eagles	2	8	1	.200	1–6–1	119	218	L3
Pittsburgh Steelers	1	9	1	.100	1–6–1	103	276	L2

Note: Tie games were not officially counted in the standings until 1972.
