= Stan McRae =

American football player (1919–1998)

Profile
- Position: End

Personal information
- Born: August 13, 1919; Michigan, U.S.
- Died: October 16, 1998 (aged 79)

Career information
- College: Michigan State
- NFL draft: 1941: 17th round, 160th overall pick

Career history
- 1946: Washington Redskins

Stanley Philip McRae (August 13, 1919 – October 16, 1998) was an American football end in the National Football League (NFL) for the Washington Redskins. He played college football at Michigan State University and was drafted in the 17th round of the 1941 NFL draft. He signed with the team in 1946 and spent time on the active roster but never played in a game. He played for the Norfolk Shamrocks of the Dixie League in 1946 and the Paterson Panthers of the American Football League in 1947.
