= Maurice Britt =

United States Army Medal of Honor recipient (1919–1995)

- Britt in uniform

11th Lieutenant Governor of Arkansas
- In office January 10, 1967 – January 12, 1971
- Governor: Winthrop Rockefeller
- Preceded by: Nathan Green Gordon
- Succeeded by: Bob C. Riley

Personal details
- Born: Maurice Lee Britt; June 29, 1919 Carlisle, Arkansas, U.S.
- Died: November 26, 1995 (aged 76) Little Rock, Arkansas, U.S.
- Resting place: Little Rock National Cemetery
- Party: Democratic (until 1966); Republican
- Known for: NFL football player Lieutenant Governor of Arkansas (1967–1971)
- Nickname: "Footsie"

Military service
- Allegiance: United States
- Branch/service: United States Army
- Years of service: 1941–1944
- Rank: Captain
- Unit: Company L, 3rd Battalion, 30th Infantry Regiment, 3rd Infantry Division
- Battles/wars: World War II; Operation Torch; Allied invasion of Sicily; Allied invasion of Italy; Operation Shingle
- Awards: Medal of Honor; Distinguished Service Cross; Silver Star; Bronze Star Medal; Purple Heart (4); Army Commendation Medal; Military Cross (United Kingdom); Medal of Military Valor (Italy)

Maurice Lee "Footsie" Britt (June 29, 1919 – November 26, 1995) was an American military officer, businessman, and politician. He played professional football for the Detroit Lions in 1941 before entering active service with the U.S. Army during World War II, during which he was awarded the Medal of Honor.

Britt served as the 11th lieutenant governor of Arkansas during the administration of Governor Winthrop Rockefeller from 1967 to 1971. Rockefeller and Britt were the first Republicans to serve in the state of Arkansas's top two offices since Reconstruction.

== Early life ==
He was born Maurice Britt in Carlise in Lonoke County in central Arkansas, the son of Maurice Lee and Virgie Britt. His family moved from Carlisle to nearby Lonoke when he was a boy. He received the nickname "Footsie" after winning a pair of shoes at a local fair as an adolescent; he had size-thirteen feet. He graduated as the valedictorian of Lonoke High School in 1937 and entered the University of Arkansas at Fayetteville, where he was supported by an athletic scholarship in both football and basketball. He received a Bachelor of Arts degree in journalism and an Army Reserve commission as a Second Lieutenant of Infantry through Army Reserve Officers' Training Corps upon graduation in 1941. He was a member of the Sigma Chi fraternity.

== Professional football ==
Britt was selected in the 13th round of the 1941 NFL draft by the Detroit Lions, who used the 115th overall pick of the draft to take him. The 6'4" end signed a contract with the Lions and saw action in nine games during the 1941 season coming off the bench, scoring one league touchdown on a 45-yard passing play. He was unable to complete the season due to the outbreak of World War II.

== World War II ==
=== US Army ===
Britt entered active duty in December 1941 as a second lieutenant at Camp Joseph T. Robinson in North Little Rock. He was assigned to Company L, 3rd Battalion, 30th Infantry Regiment, 3rd Infantry Division during training at Fort Lewis, Washington, Fort Ord, California, and Camp Pickett in Virginia. He received a partial deferment to entering active duty until after the 1941 football season. He initially joined the 3rd Division and participated in coastal defense on the West Coast of the United States. On October 23, 1942, the 30th Infantry and the 3rd Division embarked for North Africa.

North Africa

On November 8, 1942, he was a platoon leader in Company L when the 3rd Infantry Division and two other U.S. Army divisions landed during the invasion of French North Africa under Major General George S. Patton, Jr. who was in command of the Western Forces. Britt and his unit landed at the North African beach at Casablanca, French Morocco. The 30th Infantry came on shore and quickly secured the left flank of the 3rd Division and silenced Fort Blondin in the process which had been firing on the naval forces lying off the Moroccan coast.

By November 11, the 30th Infantry and the 3rd Division had secured Casablanca. In January 1943, the 3rd Battalion, 30th Infantry were assigned to personal guard duty for Sir Winston Churchill and President Franklin D. Roosevelt during the Casablanca Conference. At the end of the North African Campaign, the 3rd Division began training in Bizerte, Tunisia for the invasion of Sicily.

Italy

Britt continued to serve as a platoon leader during the amphibious invasion of Sicily on July 10, 1943. The 3rd Battalion, 30th Infantry executed one of the longest foot marches in modern military history, from near Gela northward to Palermo. The 3rd Battalion marched 54 miles in only 33 hours. Palermo was captured on July 22. Britt led his men through the combat and extensive marching from Palermo to Messina in Sicily.

On September 19, 1943, Britt participated in the amphibious landings in Salerno, Italy during the invasion of Italy (Operation Avalanche). This was his third amphibious assault landing of the war. He took command of Company L after his company commander was wounded and evacuated. On September 22, he led an assault on Acerno, Italy which was 10 miles from Salerno, and destroyed an enemy machine gun position. The 30th Infantry captured Acerno and he received a Silver Star for gallantry in action and his first of four Purple Hearts.

By early October 1943, the whole of southern Italy was in Allied hands, and the Allied armies faced the Volturno Line, the first of a series of prepared defensive lines running across Italy from which the Germans chose to fight delaying actions, giving ground slowly and buying time to complete their preparation of the Winter Line, their strongest defensive line south of Rome. Britt led his men in the river crossing on the Volturno River. For his actions at Pietravairano on October 29, Britt received the Bronze Star Medal with "V" device. For his actions above and beyond the call of duty on the assault of Monte Retundo on November 10, north of Mignano, in central Italy, he received the Medal of Honor, British Military Cross, Italian Medal of Military Valor, and a battlefield promotion to captain.

He was part of the initial invasion at Anzio on January 22, 1944 (Operation Shingle). On January 23, in one instance at the Pontine Marshes, Britt and his men were having difficulty locating German gun positions. Captain Britt, in plain view of the German lines, clapped his hands above his head to deliberately draw enemy gunfire, thus exposing a gun position so it could be destroyed. Thereafter American units in the area referred to the intersection there as "Britt's Junction".

Britt directed mortar and artillery fire from close proximity over the next day, contributing to the destruction of 25 German machine gun positions. Britt was subsequently awarded the Distinguished Service Cross for extraordinary heroism for his actions on January 22 and 23 at the Anzio beachhead near Latina.

Britt's own war in Europe came to an abrupt end at this time, however. A German tank got into range of Britt's command post, a stone farmhouse. The shell it fired passed through three walls, blowing off Britt's right arm at the elbow, fracturing a leg, and perforating his back in 47 places. "I sure was lucky," Britt noted shortly thereafter. "If I'd been standing a little further over that shell would have killed me."

In February 1944, he was evacuated to the United States for medical treatment at Lawson General Hospital in Atlanta. While recuperating from his wounds, he participated in a War Bond tour. He received an honorable discharge on December 27, 1944.

Maurice Britt became the first recipient of the top four combat decorations for valor awarded to an infantryman by the US Army during World War II.

== Military awards and decorations ==
Britt's awards and decorations include:

Combat Infantryman Badge
Medal of Honor	Distinguished Service Cross	Silver Star
Bronze Star Medal w/ Valor device	Purple Heart w/ 3 bronze oak leaf clusters	Army Commendation Medal
American Defense Service Medal	American Campaign Medal	European-African-Middle Eastern Campaign Medal w/ Arrowhead device and four bronze campaign stars
World War II Victory Medal	Military Cross (United Kingdom)	Medal of Military Valor (Italy)
Army Presidential Unit Citation

=== Medal of Honor ===
Britt's Medal of Honor Citation:

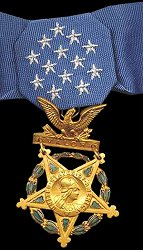
Medal of Honor

For conspicuous gallantry and intrepidity at the risk of his life above and beyond the call of duty. Disdaining enemy hand grenades and close-range machine pistols, machineguns, and rifles, Lt. Britt inspired and led a handful of his men in repelling a bitter counterattack by approximately 100 Germans against his company positions north of Mignano, Italy, the morning of 10 November 1943. During the intense fire fight, Lt. Britt's canteen and field glasses were shattered; a bullet pierced his side; his chest, face, and hands were covered with grenade wounds. Despite his wounds, for which he refused to accept medical attention until ordered to do so by his battalion commander following the battle, he personally killed 5 and wounded an unknown number of Germans, wiped out one enemy machinegun crew, fired 5 clips of carbine and an undetermined amount of M1 rifle ammunition, and threw 32 fragmentation grenades. His bold, aggressive actions, utterly disregarding superior enemy numbers, resulted in capture of 4 Germans, 2 of them wounded, and enabled several captured Americans to escape. Lt. Britt's undaunted courage and prowess in arms were largely responsible for repulsing a German counterattack which, if successful, would have isolated his battalion and destroyed his company.

== Later life ==
After the war, he briefly attended the University of Arkansas School of Law in Fayetteville but left the institution to enter business. He spent twenty years working at a furniture manufacturing company and then running the Beautyguard Manufacturing Company, a producer of aluminum building products.

In 1966, he was elected lieutenant governor, when the incumbent Democrat, Nathan Green Gordon, did not seek reelection. He was re-elected in 1968 but did not seek a third term in 1970, having deferred to his friend and Little Rock neighbor, Former House Speaker Sterling R. Cockrill, a Democrat-turned-Republican, who ran unsuccessfully on Winthrop Rockefeller's losing Republican ticket that year. Britt defeated the Democratic nominees, Judge James H. Pilkington of Hope in 1966 and State Representative Bill Wells of Hermitage in 1968. He was a lifelong Arkansas Republican, having been active in his state's Young Republicans in college. Neal Sox Johnson, the first paid executive director of the Arkansas GOP, said that he believed Rockefeller should have stepped down in 1970, and Britt should have been the gubernatorial nominee. Rockefeller was unseated that year by the Democrat Dale Bumpers. As Rockefeller and Britt left office, two legislative Republicans remained behind, State Senator Jim Caldwell and Representative Preston Bynum, both of Benton County in far northwestern Arkansas.

After leaving office, Britt was appointed by the Richard Nixon administration as district director of the Small Business Administration. He served in that capacity from 1971 to 1985.

In 1986, Britt came out of political retirement to seek the Republican gubernatorial nomination. He polled only 3,116 votes (13.9 percent) to 13,831 ballots (61.9 percent) for former Governor Frank D. White. A third candidate, Wayne Lanier, received 4,576 votes (20.5 percent) in a low-turnout primary. White was thereafter defeated in the general election for a second time by future U.S. President Bill Clinton.

Britt was a leader in civic affairs too. He was past state chairman of the Crippled Children's Hospital, Easter Seals, and the Federal Executive Association. He was a member of the Arkansas Sports Hall of Fame and received the National Collegiate Athletic Association Sports Achievement Award.

== Death ==
Britt died of heart failure in the John L. McClellan Memorial Veterans Hospital in Little Rock. He was one of two lieutenant governors in state history to lie in state in the State Capitol Rotunda, the other being Winthrop Paul Rockefeller, the son of Governor Winthrop Rockefeller. The coffin was open, and Britt's military coat hung from the back of his favorite rocking chair, which was placed next to the body. His medals and a military cap were placed on a nearby table. An Army Sergeant stood at the head of the casket throughout the six hours that Britt lay in state.

Services were held in the Calvary Baptist Church of Little Rock, where Britt was a member. Burial was in Little Rock National Cemetery.

== Personal life ==
Britt had three daughters, Andrea Schafer and Nancy McDurmont, both of Lonoke, and Patricia Anne Britt of Falls Church, Virginia; two sons, Maurice Lee Britt, III (born c. 1950), and his wife, Dee Britt, of Royal, Arkansas, and Timothy Watson Britt (born c. 1955) of Little Rock; one brother, B. A. Britt (born c. 1925) of Carlisle; twelve grandchildren, and one great-grandchild. Britt's wife died shortly before his own death. Britt was a distant cousin of Circuit Judge Henry M. Britt of Hot Springs, the 1960 Republican gubernatorial nominee against Orval Faubus. He was also a cousin of internationally known actress Dorothy Lamour. [4]

== Honors ==
- Arkansas Sports Hall of Fame (1972)
- Captain Maurice L. Britt United States Army Reserve Center, North Little Rock, Arkansas

== See also ==
- List of Medal of Honor recipients for World War II
- List of members of the American Legion

== Notes ==
Party political offices
Preceded by	Republican nominee for Lieutenant Governor of Arkansas; 1966, 1968	Succeeded by Sterling Cockrill, Jr.
Political offices
Preceded by Nathan Green Gordon	Lieutenant Governor of Arkansas; 1967–1971	Succeeded by Bob Cowley Riley
