= Terry Fox (American football) =

American football player (1918–1981)

No. 36, 76, 52
- Positions: Fullback, linebacker

Personal information
- Born: July 6, 1918; Newark, New Jersey, U.S.
- Died: April 1, 1981 (aged 62); Miami, Florida, U.S.
- Listed height: 6 ft 1 in (1.85 m)
- Listed weight: 208 lb (94 kg)

Career information
- College: Miami (FL) (1937-1940)
- NFL draft: 1941: 17th round, 153rd overall pick

Career history
- Pittsburgh Steelers (1941)*; Philadelphia Eagles (1941, 1945); Miami Seahawks (1946)
- * Offseason or practice squad member only

Career NFL/AAFC statistics
- Rushing yards: 123
- Rushing average: 3.7
- Receptions: 9
- Receiving yards: 98
- Stats at Pro Football Reference

Patrick Terrence Fox (July 6, 1918 – April 1, 1981) was an American professional football player who was a fullback and linebacker for three seasons in the National Football League (NFL) and All-America Football Conference (AAFC) as a member of the Philadelphia Eagles and Miami Seahawks. He played college football for the Miami Hurricanes and was selected in the 17th round of the 1941 NFL draft by the Pittsburgh Steelers.

== Early life and education ==
Fox was born on July 6, 1918, in Newark, New Jersey. He attended high school in the state before earning a scholarship at University of Miami. He spent 1937–1940 at Miami, earning a varsity letter in his final three seasons. A 1938 advertisement by The Miami News wrote, "Here he is, fans: Terry Fox, powerful sophomore fullback who will lead the power plays at Burdine stadium tonight when the University of Miami Hurricanes oppose Tampa's Spartans in the annual football classic between the two schools. He came to us billed as an end. but soon found he liked to buck the line. He's one of the Hurricanes you'd better watch tonight." After one of his best games during the 1939 season, which included 149 rushing yards, The Miami News wrote, "Twas power night at the stadium and Terry Fox was at the throttle!" Following his senior season, Fox was a unanimous selection to the all-state team and was considered to be one of the best in the state. He also was named team MVP.

== Professional career ==
Following his college career, Fox was selected in the 17th round (153rd overall) of the 1941 NFL draft by the Pittsburgh Steelers. He signed his rookie contract on April 15. The Miami News reported it was believed to be a "fat contract." However, he left the team a few months later and subsequently joined the Philadelphia Eagles in July. Fox played in all eleven games during his rookie season, and started two. Statistically, he made 21 rushing attempts, gaining 97 yards, with a long of 13, and an average of 4.6 per carry. He also recorded six receptions for 71 yards. Following the season Fox called the professional game, "lots tougher than the college game ... All those guys are tough and you never get a chance to let up."

He left the Eagles in January after being drafted to serve in World War II as a member of the Marine Air Corps. He enlisted in March, and served the next 42 months overseas. He was able to rise to the rank of captain, commanding Company B, 1st Battalion of the 6th Marines during the campaigns on Salpan, Tinlan and Okinawa. He returned to the Eagles in November 1945, playing in two games.

His contract with the team expired the following year and he was signed in March by the Miami Seahawks of the All-America Football Conference (AAFC). The Miami News wrote, "Harvey Hester, irked enough over "raiding" staged by the rival National football league to threaten court proceedings, did a little raiding of his own today by signing Terry Fox, ex-University of Miami fullback and former Philadelphia Eagle, for his Miami pro gridders. "But he doesn't have a 1946 contract with the Eagles," Hester explained In announcing the signing. "He played three (Note: Pro-Football-Reference.com lists two games played.) games with the Eagles last year after returning from the marines, but that contract expired."

Fox was waived by the Seahawks in early September, but resigned near the end of the month. The Miami News reported, " A move believed certain to meet with approval of Miami fans was the rehiring of Terry Fox, former U. Miami fullback and a veteran of four years with the Philadelphia Eagles of the NFL. Fox, one of the most popular players ever to appear locally, did not learn of his good fortune until he read about it in the newspapers late yesterday on returning from a fishing trip." He appeared in between eight and nine games during the season, compiling 26 rushing yards on 12 carries, just a 2.2 average. He also made two punts for 44 yards on special teams, and three catches for 27 yards receiving. The Seahawks folded following the season, ending his professional career.

== Death ==
Fox died on April 1, 1981, in Miami, at the age of 62 following a heart attack.
