= Hank Piro =

American football player (1917–2011)

No. 89
- Position: End

Personal information
- Born: December 20, 1917; Nordholz, Germany
- Died: April 18, 2011 (aged 93); Iowa City, Iowa
- Listed height: 6 ft 0 in (1.83 m)
- Listed weight: 186 lb (84 kg)

Career information
- High school: Floral Park (NY) Sewanhaka
- College: Syracuse

Career history
- Philadelphia Eagles (1941)

Career statistics
- Games played: 10
- Receptions: 10
- Receiving yards: 141
- Stats at Pro Football Reference

Henry William Piro (December 20, 1917 – April 18, 2011) was a professional American football end who played in 1941 with the Philadelphia Eagles.
