= Gran Harrison =

American football player (1917–1997)

Profile
- Position: End

Personal information
- Born: July 1, 1917; Ashland, Mississippi
- Died: December 13, 1997 (aged 80)
- Listed height: 6 ft 3 in (1.91 m)
- Listed weight: 211 lb (96 kg)

Career information
- College: Mississippi State

Career history
- Philadelphia Eagles (1941); Detroit Lions (1942)

Career statistics
- Games: 5
- Stats at Pro Football Reference

Granville Pearl Harrison (July 1, 1917 – December 13, 1997) was an American football player.

A native of Ashland, Mississippi, Harrison played college football at Mississippi State.

He played professional football in the National Football League (NFL) as an end for the Philadelphia Eagles in 1941 and for the Detroit Lions in 1942. He appeared in five NFL games, one as a starter.
