= Dick Dolly =

American football player (1917–1959)

Profile
- Position: Wide receiver

Personal information
- Born: December 12, 1917; Onego, West Virginia
- Died: May 30, 1959 (aged 41); North Augusta, South Carolina

Career information
- College: West Virginia

Career history
- 1941 & 1945: Pittsburgh Steelers

John Richard Dolly (December 12, 1917 – May 30, 1959) was a wide receiver in the National Football League. He played for the Pittsburgh Steelers. He graduated from West Virginia with a degree in agriculture.
