= Vince Dennery =

American football player (1916–1989)

Personal information
- Born: November 17, 1916; Jersey City, New Jersey
- Died: August 9, 1989 (aged 72); Philadelphia
- Listed height: 5 ft 11 in (1.80 m)
- Listed weight: 190 lb (86 kg)

Career information
- College: Fordham

Career history
- New York Giants (1941)

Vincent Paul Dennery November 17, 1916 - August 9, 1989) was an American professional football player who appeared in nine games for the New York Giants of the National Football League in 1941.

== Information ==
Dennery played football for Fordham University. He was part of one of Fordham's Seven Blocks of Granite teams. He was inducted into the Fordham University Hall of Fame in 1979. He was also a one-time candidate for the All-American Team.

== Personal life ==
Dennery had severe burn scars on the left side of his body after falling onto an electric train rail.

Dennery had a son named Michael who also played professional football and a son named Tom Dennery who tried out for the New York Giants.
