= George Kracum =

American football player (1918–1981)

No. 10
- Position: Fullback

Personal information
- Born: January 24, 1918; Tresckow, Pennsylvania, U.S.
- Died: June 7, 1981 (aged 63); Minneapolis, Minnesota, U.S.
- Listed height: 6 ft 1 in (1.85 m)
- Listed weight: 210 lb (95 kg)

Career information
- High school: Hazleton (PA)
- College: Pittsburgh
- NFL draft: 1941: 8th round, 63rd overall pick

Career history
- Brooklyn Dodgers (1941)

Awards and highlights
- First-team All-Eastern (1940)

Career NFL statistics
- Games played: 11
- Rushing Yards: 169
- Rushing TDs: 3
- Stats at Pro Football Reference

George Vince Kracum (January 24, 1918 – June 7, 1981) was an American professional football fullback. He played for the Brooklyn Dodgers in 1941.
