= Mort Landsberg =

American football player (1919–1970)

No. 30, 99
- Position: Halfback

Personal information
- Born: July 25, 1919; New York City, U.S.
- Died: December 31, 1970 (aged 51); New York City, U.S.
- Listed height: 5 ft 11 in (1.80 m)
- Listed weight: 180 lb (82 kg)

Career information
- High school: Lawrenceville School (NJ)
- College: Cornell (1939-1940)
- NFL draft: 1941: 22nd round, 204th overall pick

Career history
- Philadelphia Eagles (1941); Los Angeles Dons (1947)

Career NFL/AAFC statistics
- Rushing yards: 58
- Rushing average: 2.3
- Receptions: 6
- Receiving yards: 51
- Stats at Pro Football Reference

Mortimer William Landsberg Jr. (July 25, 1919 – December 31, 1970) was an American professional football halfback. He was Jewish.

He was drafted in the 22nd round of the 1941 NFL draft by the Pittsburgh Steelers with the 204th overall pick. He played for the Philadelphia Eagles in 1941, and for the Los Angeles Dons in 1947.
