= Tony Cemore =

American football player (1917–1981)

- Cemore with Creighton, 1940

No. 61
- Position: Guard

Personal information
- Born: August 8, 1917; Omaha, Nebraska, U.S.
- Died: March 28, 1981 (aged 63); Omaha, Nebraska, U.S.
- Listed height: 6 ft 0 in (1.83 m)
- Listed weight: 210 lb (95 kg)

Career information
- High school: Omaha Tech (NE)
- College: Creighton

Career history
- Philadelphia Eagles (1941); Western Army All-Stars (1942); Miami Seahawks (1946)*; Greensboro Patriots (1946)
- * Offseason or practice squad member only

Anthony Salvatore Cemore (August 8, 1917 – March 28, 1981) was an American football guard. He played college football for Creighton (1939–1940) and professional football in the National Football League for the Philadelphia Eagles (1941). During World War II, he served in the Army and played for the Western Army All-Stars in 1942.

== Early years and Creighton ==
Cemore was born in 1917 in Omaha, Nebraska. He attended Omaha Tech High School and won all-city honors as a tackle for the school's football team in 1935. In 1936, he played football at Creighton Prep.

He attended Creighton University in Omaha and played college football as a guard for the Creighton Bluejays in 1939 and 1940. He won All-Missouri Valley honors in 1940 and was selected by the National Civic League as the best Italian-American athlete of 1940.

== Professional football and military service ==
He then played professional football in the National Football League (NFL) for the Philadelphia Eagles (NFL), appearing in 10 games, one as a starter, during the 1941 season.

After the 1941 season, and with the United States entry into World War II, Cemore was inducted into the U.S. Army. During the fall of 1942, he was selected to play on the Western Army All-Stars football team, a team of star serving in the Army that played games against NFL teams. In addition to line play, Cemore also handled place-kicking for the All-Stars.

In May 1946, he signed with the Miami Seahawks of the All-America Football Conference but he was released at the end of August. He did play in 1946 for the Greensboro Patriots in the Dixie Football League.

== Later life ==
He died in 1981 in Omaha at age 63.
