= Wes McAfee =

American football player (1919–1984)

No. 40
- Position: Halfback

Personal information
- Born: October 20, 1919; North Corbin, Kentucky, U.S.
- Died: January 26, 1984 (aged 64); Durham, North Carolina, U.S.
- Listed height: 5 ft 11 in (1.80 m)
- Listed weight: 175 lb (79 kg)

Career information
- High school: Ironton (OH)
- College: Duke
- NFL draft: 1941: 16th round, 142nd overall pick

Career history
- Philadelphia Eagles (1941)

Career NFL statistics
- Games played: 8
- Rushing Yards: 6
- Stats at Pro Football Reference

Wesley Taylor McAfee (October 20, 1919 – January 26, 1984) was an American professional football halfback. He played for the Philadelphia Eagles of the National Football League (NFL) in 1941. With the Eagles, he appeared in eight games, and carried nine times for six yards, caught three passes for 30 yards and a touchdown, completed a four-yard pass, kicked two extra points, punted once for 32 yards, returned three punts for 21 yards, and returned two kickoffs for 64 yards.

McAfee played college football for the Duke Blue Devils football team alongside his older brother, future Pro Football Hall of Fame halfback George McAfee. After college, Wes McAfee was drafted in the 16th round of the 1941 NFL draft by the Pittsburgh Steelers.
