= Kirk Hershey =

American football player (1918–1979)

No. 80, 22
- Position: End

Personal information
- Born: July 7, 1918; Philadelphia, Pennsylvania, U.S.
- Died: January 23, 1979 (aged 60); Palm Beach, Florida, U.S.
- Listed height: 6 ft 2 in (1.88 m)
- Listed weight: 215 lb (98 kg)

Career information
- High school: William Penn Charter School
- College: Carroll (WI); Cornell
- NFL draft: 1941: 17th round, 154th overall pick

Career history
- Cleveland Rams (1941); Philadelphia Eagles (1941)

Career NFL statistics
- Receptions: 1
- Receiving yards: 11
- Stats at Pro Football Reference

Kirk Hershey (July 7, 1918 – January 23, 1979) was a player in the National Football League (NFL). He was drafted in the seventeenth round of the 1941 NFL draft by the Cleveland Rams with the 154th overall pick. He split that season between the Rams and the Philadelphia Eagles.
