= 1941 Chicago Bears season =

NFL team season

- Head coach: George Halas
- Home stadium: Wrigley Field

Results
- Record: 10–1
- Division place: 1st NFL Western
- Playoffs: Won Divisional Playoff (vs. Packers) 33–14; Won NFL Championship (vs. Giants) 37–9

The 1941 season was the Chicago Bears' 22nd in the National Football League. The team improved on their 8–3 record in 1939–40 and finished at 10–1 under head coach George Halas, en route to their second straight NFL championship and fifth league title.

== Before the season ==
=== Draft ===
1941 Chicago Bears draft
Round	Pick	Player	Position	College	Notes
1	1	Tom Harmon	Halfback	Michigan	
1	3	Norm Standlee *	Fullback	Stanford	
1	9	Don Scott	Back	Ohio State	
3	23	Hugh Gallarneau *	Halfback	Stanford	
5	39	Charlie O'Rourke	Quarterback	Boston College	
6	48	Tommy O'Boyle	Guard	Tulane	
7	59	John Federovitch *	Tackle	Davis & Elkins	
8	61	Fred Hartman	Tackle	Rice	
8	62	David Rankin	End	Purdue	
8	68	Al Matuza *	Center	Georgetown	
9	79	Hal Lahar *	Guard	Oklahoma	
10	88	Jim (Sweet) Lalanne	Back	North Carolina	
11	99	Jim Hardin	End	Kentucky	
12	108	Bob Morrow	Back	Illinois Wesleyan	
13	119	Jim Johnson	Back	Santa Clara	
14	128	Johnny Martin	Wingback	Oklahoma	
15	139	Jack Mulkey	End	Fresno State	
16	148	Bob Osterman	Center	Notre Dame	
17	159	Bill Glenn	Quarterback	Eastern Illinois	
18	168	Ollie Hahnenstein	Back	Northwestern	
19	179	Alex Winterson	Tackle	Duke	
20	188	Jack Odle	Quarterback	TCU	
21	194	Hunter Corbern	Guard	Mississippi State	
22	198	Dave Buck	Tackle	Colgate	
Made roster * Made at least one Pro Bowl during career

== Regular season ==
=== Schedule ===
Program for a preseason exhibition game against a team of college Eastern All-Stars.

Game	Date	Opponent	Result	Record	Venue	Attendance	Recap	Sources
1	September 28	at **Green Bay Packers**	**W** 25–17	1–0	City Stadium	24,876	Recap	
2	October 5	at **Cleveland Rams**	**W** 48–21	2–0	Municipal Stadium	23,850	Recap	
3	October 12	**Chicago Cardinals**	**W** 53–7	3–0	Wrigley Field	34,668	Recap	
4	October 19	**Detroit Lions**	**W** 49–0	4–0	Wrigley Field	29,980	Recap	
5	October 26	Pittsburgh Steelers	**W** 34–7	5–0	Wrigley Field	17,212	Recap	
6	November 2	**Green Bay Packers**	**L** 14–16	5–1	Wrigley Field	46,484	Recap	
7	November 9	**Cleveland Rams**	**W** 31–13	6–1	Wrigley Field	18,102	Recap	
8	November 16	Washington Redskins	**W** 35–21	7–1	Wrigley Field	30,095	Recap	
9	November 23	at **Detroit Lions**	**W** 24–7	8–1	Briggs Stadium	28,657	Recap	
10	November 30	at Philadelphia Eagles	**W** 49–14	9–1	Shibe Park	32,608	Recap	
11	December 7	at **Chicago Cardinals**	**W** 34–24	10–1	Comiskey Park	18,879	Recap	
Note: Intra-division opponents are in **bold** text.

== Standings ==
Program for the October 19 match-up with the visiting Detroit Lions. This is a stock commercial cover illustration.

This program for the 1941 Redskins game features QB Solly Sherman in 1940 action against the Detroit Lions.

NFL Western Division
	W	L	T	PCT	DIV	PF	PA	STK
Chicago Bears	10	1	0	.909	7–1	396	147	W5
Green Bay Packers	10	1	0	.909	7–1	258	120	W8
Detroit Lions	4	6	1	.400	3–4–1	121	195	W1
Chicago Cardinals	3	7	1	.300	1–6–1	127	197	L2
Cleveland Rams	2	9	0	.182	1–7	116	244	L9

Note: Tie games were not officially counted in the standings until 1972.

== Postseason ==
The Bears won the Western Division championship by beating the Packers, 33–14, in a playoff at Wrigley Field. The Bears then beat the Giants, 37–9, at Wrigley Field to win the NFL Championship.

See 1941 NFL playoffs and 1941 NFL Championship Game

Round	Date	Opponent	Result	Record	Venue	Attendance	Recap	Sources
Western Division	December 14	Green Bay Packers	W 33–14	1–0	Wrigley Field	43,425	Recap	
NFL Championship	December 21	New York Giants	W 37–9	2–0	Wrigley Field	13,341	Recap	

== Roster ==
1941 Chicago Bears final roster
Quarterbacks: 37 Young Bussey S; 42 Sid Luckman P/S; 17 Bob Snyder K/S; Ends/Receivers: 51 Ken Kavanaugh; 20 Bob Nowaskey; 14 Dick Plasman K; 76 Hamp Pool; 6 John Siegal; 30 George Wilson	Linemen/Linebackers: 35 Lee Artoe T/DT; 26 Al Baisi G/DG; 82 Ray Bray G/DG; 34 John Federovitch T/DT; 23 Aldo Forte G/DG; 21 Dan Fortmann G/DG; 24 Billy Hughes C/LB; 29 Ed Kolman T/DT; 12 Hal Lahar G/T/DG/DT; 15 Al Matuza C/LB; 27 Joe Mihal T/DT; 16 George Musso G/DG; 13 Joe Stydahar T/DT/K; 66 Bulldog Turner C/LB	Backs: 4 Harry Clarke RB/CB; 2 Gary Famiglietti FB/LB; 8 Hugh Gallarneau RB/CB; 11 Joe Maniaci FB/LB/K; 5 George McAfee RB/CB/P; 57 Ray McLean RB/CB; 25 Ray Nolting RB/CB; 9 Bill Osmanski FB/LB; 22 Norm Standlee FB/LB; 48 Bob Swisher RB/CB; Reserve: Bill Rogers T/DT (inactive); Rookies in italics

== All-Star Game ==
The Bears defeated the NFL All-Stars 35–24 on January 4, 1942.
