= Lee Gentry =

American football player (1918–1992)

No. 46
- Position: Halfback

Personal information
- Born: December 1, 1918; Shawnee, Oklahoma, U.S.
- Died: December 19, 1992 (aged 74); Cortez, Colorado, U.S.
- Listed height: 6 ft 0 in (1.83 m)
- Listed weight: 198 lb (90 kg)

Career information
- College: Tulsa
- NFL draft: 1941: 22nd round, 200th overall pick

Career history
- Washington Redskins (1941)

Career NFL statistics
- Rushing yards: 13
- Rushing average: 2.6
- Stats at Pro Football Reference

Elmer Lee Gentry (December 1, 1918 – December 19, 1992) was an American professional football running back in the National Football League (NFL) for the Washington Redskins. He played college football at the University of Tulsa and was drafted in the 22nd round of the 1941 NFL draft.

Gentry graduated from Shawnee High School in 1937 where he was an All-state football player. At the University of Tulsa he was named MVP in the East-West All-Star game and drafted by the Washington Redskins in the 22nd round. His pro football career was cut short by World War II.
