= Ken Dow =

American football player (1917–1988)

No. 25
- Position: Fullback

Personal information
- Born: November 18, 1917; Ephrata, Washington, U.S.
- Died: November 17, 1988 (aged 70); Helena, Montana, U.S.
- Listed height: 5 ft 10 in (1.78 m)
- Listed weight: 198 lb (90 kg)

Career information
- High school: Great Falls (Great Falls, Montana)
- College: Oregon State (1937-1940)
- NFL draft: 1941: 16th round, 150th overall pick

Career history
- Washington Redskins (1941)

Career NFL statistics
- Games played: 2
- Stats at Pro Football Reference

Kenneth William Dow (November 18, 1917 – November 17, 1988) was an American professional football fullback in the National Football League (NFL). He played in two games for the Washington Redskins in 1941. He played college football at Oregon State University and was drafted in the sixteenth round of the 1941 NFL draft.
