= Owen Thuerk =

American football player and coach (1918–1985)

Profile
- Position: End

Personal information
- Born: February 5, 1918; Chicago, U.S.
- Died: November 18, 1985 (aged 67)
- Listed height: 6 ft 2 in (1.88 m)
- Listed weight: 193 lb (88 kg)

Career information
- College: St. Joseph's

Career history
- Detroit Lions (1941)

Career statistics
- Games: 3
- Stats at Pro Football Reference

Owen Frederick "Red" Thuerk (February 5, 1918 – November 18, 1985) was an American football player and coach.

A native of Chicago, Thuerk played college football at Saint Joseph's College in Indiana and professional football in the National Football League as an end for the Detroit Lions. He signed with the Lions in June 1941 and appeared in three games during the 1941 season.

With the United States entry into World War II following the attack on Pearl Harbor, Thuerk entered in the Army Air Force. He played football for the 1943 and 1944 March Field Flyers football teams that were ranked No. 10 in the final AP Poll each year.

After the war, Thuerk worked as a high school football coach at St. Phillip High School for 23 years from 1946 to 1969. He was later an employee of the Chicago Park District. He was inducted into the Chicago Catholic League Coaches Hall of Fame. He died in 1985 at age 67.
