= Frank Zoppetti =

American football player (1916–2009)

No. 76
- Position: Running back

Personal information
- Born: April 16, 1916; Cherry Valley, Pennsylvania, U.S.
- Died: October 3, 2009 (aged 93); Wynnewood, Pennsylvania, U.S.
- Listed height: 5 ft 11 in (1.80 m)
- Listed weight: 185 lb (84 kg)

Career information
- High school: Cherry Valley (PA)
- College: Duquesne

Career history
- Pittsburgh Steelers (1941)

Career statistics
- Games played: 4
- Pass attempts: 1
- Stats at Pro Football Reference

Frank Zoppetti (April 16, 1916 – October 3, 2009) was an American football running back for the Pittsburgh Steelers for one season, in 1941. He was also a quarterback in college for Duquesne. He played in four games. Zoppetti died on October 3, 2009, at the age of 93.
