= Joe Lokanc =

American football player (1917–2009)

No. 27
- Position: Guard

Personal information
- Born: March 11, 1917; East Chicago, Indiana, U.S.
- Died: March 30, 2009 (aged 92); Naperville, Illinois, U.S.
- Listed height: 5 ft 11 in (1.80 m)
- Listed weight: 205 lb (93 kg)

Career information
- High school: Theodore Roosevelt (East Chicago)
- College: Northwestern (1937–1940)
- NFL draft: 1941: 14th round, 123rd overall pick

Career history
- Chicago Cardinals (1941)

Career NFL statistics
- Receptions: 1
- Receiving yards: 2
- Stats at Pro Football Reference

Joe Lokanc (March 11, 1917 – March 30, 2009) was an American professional football guard. He was drafted by the Chicago Cardinals in the 14th round (123rd overall) of the 1941 NFL Draft. He played for the Chicago Cardinals in 1941.

He died on March 30, 2009, in Naperville, Illinois at age 92.
