= Leo Stasica =

American football player (1916–1982)

No. 11, 41, 28
- Position: Back

Personal information
- Born: June 15, 1916; Rockford, Illinois, U.S.
- Died: September 23, 1982 (aged 66); Denver, Colorado, U.S.
- Listed height: 5 ft 11 in (1.80 m)
- Listed weight: 185 lb (84 kg)

Career information
- High school: Rockford Central
- College: Illinois (1935-1936); Colorado (1939-1940)
- NFL draft: 1941: 3rd round, 24th overall pick

Career history
- Brooklyn Dodgers (1941); Washington Redskins (1943); Boston Yanks (1944); Los Angeles Dons (1946)*
- * Offseason or practice squad member only

Career NFL statistics
- Passing yards: 273
- TD–INT: 1–8
- Passer rating: 24.1
- Stats at Pro Football Reference

Leo Walter Stasica (June 15, 1916 – September 1982) was an American professional football player who was a running back and quarterback in the National Football League for the Brooklyn Dodgers, the Washington Redskins, and the Boston Yanks. He played college football for the Illinois Fighting Illini and Colorado Buffaloes. Stasica was selected in the third round of the 1941 NFL draft with the 24th overall pick.
