= 1941 Detroit Lions season =

NFL team season

- Head coach: Bill Edwards
- Home stadium: Briggs Stadium

Results
- Record: 4–6–1
- Division place: 3rd NFL Western
- Playoffs: Did not qualify

The 1941 Detroit Lions season was their 12th in the league. The team failed to improve on their previous season's output of 5–5–1, winning only four games. They failed to qualify for the playoffs for the sixth consecutive season.

== Offseason ==
=== NFL Draft ===
1941 Detroit Lions draft
Round	Pick	Player	Position	College	Notes
1	5	Jim Thomason	TB	Texas A&M	
3	20	Harry Hopp	B	Nebraska	
4	30	Augie Lio	G	Georgetown (DC)	
5	35	Robert Nelson	C	Baylor	
6	45	John Tripson	T	Mississippi State	
7	55	John Jett	E	Wake Forest	
8	65	Joseph Manzo	T	Boston College	
9	75	Jasper Davis	B	Duke	
10	85	Ted Pavelec	G	Detroit Mercy	
11	95	Milt Piepul	FB	Notre Dame	
12	105	Billy Jefferson	HB	Mississippi State	
13	115	Maurice Britt	E	Arkansas	
14	125	Alex Schibanoff	T	Franklin & Marshall	
15	135	Perry Scott	E	Muhlenberg	
16	145	George Sarris	C	Providence	
17	155	Fred Gage	B	Wisconsin	
18	165	Charlie Ishmael	B	Kentucky	
19	175	Len Isberg	B	Oregon	
20	185	Paul Friedlander	B	Carnegie Mellon	
Made roster † Pro Football Hall of Fame

== Roster ==
1941 Detroit Lions final roster
Backs: 30 Steve Belichick FB/LB; 11 Dick Booth RB/CB; 25 Bill Callihan RB/S; 31 Harry Hopp FB/LB; 46 Billy Jefferson RB/CB/P; 12 Ned Mathews RB/CB; 23 Paul Moore RB/S; 14 John Noppenberg RB/CB; 32 Lloyd Parsons FB/LB; 33 Milt Piepul FB/LB; 42 Cotton Price RB/CB/S/P; 15 Lou Tomasetti RB/CB; 44 Whizzer White RB/CB/P	Linemen/Linebackers: 65 Stan Batinski G/DG; 72 Clem Crabtree G/DG; 73 Tony Furst T/DT; 61 Augie Lio G/DG/K; 76 Andy Logan C/LB; 62 Jack Mattiford G/DG; 51 Bob Nelson C/T/LB; 71 Ted Pavelec T/DT; 66 Bill Radovich G/DG; 79 Alex Schibanoff T/DT; 70 John Tripson T/DT; 75 Emil Uremovich T/DT; 68 Socko Wiethe G/DG; 50 Alex Wojciechowicz C/LB	Ends/Receivers: 82 Stan Andersen; 81 Maurice Britt; 80 Bill Fisk; 83 John Jett; 84 Paul Szakash; 86 Owen Thuerk; Reserve: 10 Lloyd Cardwell RB/CB (IR); Dave Diehl E (inactive); 52 Dunc Obee C/LB (Military); Mike Rodak E (IR); Stillman Rouse E (Military); rookies in italics

== Regular Season ==
=== Schedule ===
Game	Date	Opponent	Result	Record	Venue	Attendance	Recap	Sources
1	September 14	at **Green Bay Packers**	**L** 0–23	0–1	City Stadium	16,734	Recap	
2	September 21	at Brooklyn Dodgers	**L** 7–14	0–2	Ebbets Field	19,269	Recap	
3	September 27	at **Chicago Cardinals**	**T** 14–14	0–2–1	Comiskey Park	17,458	Recap	
—	Bye							
4	October 12	**Cleveland Rams**	**W** 17–7	1–2–1	Briggs Stadium	26,481	Recap	
5	October 19	at **Chicago Bears**	**L** 0–49	1–3–1	Wrigley Field	29,980	Recap	
6	October 26	**Green Bay Packers**	**L** 7–24	1–4–1	Briggs Stadium	30,269	Recap	
7	November 2	at **Cleveland Rams**	**W** 14–0	2–4–1	Cleveland Stadium	10,554	Recap	
8	November 9	at New York Giants	**L** 13–20	2–5–1	Polo Grounds	27,875	Recap	
9	November 16	Philadelphia Eagles	**W** 21–17	3–5–1	Briggs Stadium	16,306	Recap	
10	November 23	**Chicago Bears**	**L** 7–24	3–6–1	Briggs Stadium	28,657	Recap	
11	November 30	**Chicago Cardinals**	**W** 21–3	4–6–1	Briggs Stadium	17,051	Recap	
Note: Intra-division opponents are in **bold** text. • September 27: Saturday night game

== Standings ==
Program for the October 26 game against the Green Bay Packers.

NFL Western Division
	W	L	T	PCT	DIV	PF	PA	STK
Chicago Bears	10	1	0	.909	7–1	396	147	W5
Green Bay Packers	10	1	0	.909	7–1	258	120	W8
Detroit Lions	4	6	1	.400	3–4–1	121	195	W1
Chicago Cardinals	3	7	1	.300	1–6–1	127	197	L2
Cleveland Rams	2	9	0	.182	1–7	116	244	L9

Note: Tie games were not officially counted in the standings until 1972.
