= Bill Murphy (American football) =

American football player (1914–1985)

- Bill Murphy, 1942

Profile
- Position: Guard

Personal information
- Born: April 7, 1914; Owensboro, Kentucky, U.S.
- Died: January 15, 1985 (aged 70)
- Listed height: 6 ft 0 in (1.83 m)
- Listed weight: 203 lb (92 kg)

Career information
- High school: Mount Carmel (IL)
- College: Washington University

Career history
- Chicago Cardinals (1940–1941)
- Stats at Pro Football Reference

William Leslie Murphy (April 7, 1914 – January 15, 1985) was an American football guard. A native of Owensboro, Kentucky, he attended high school in Mount Carmel, Illinois, and played college football at Washington University in St. Louis. He then played professional football in the National Football League (NFL) for the Chicago Cardinals during the 1940 and 1941 seasons. He appeared in 12 NFL games. In 1942, he was hired as the line coach at Washington University.
