= Julius Battista =

American football player (1916–1984)

Profile
- Position: Guard

Personal information
- Born: October 1, 1916; Endicott, New York, U.S.
- Died: August 13, 1986 (aged 72); Jacksonville, Florida, U.S.
- Listed height: 5 ft 10 in (1.78 m)
- Listed weight: 200 lb (91 kg)

Career information
- High school: Union-Endicott High School
- College: Florida (1937–1940)

Julius Bernard Battista (October 1, 1916 – November 2, 1984) was an American football guard. He played college football at Florida and was drafted in the seventh round (51st overall) of the 1941 NFL draft by the Philadelphia Eagles.

Battista was born on October 1, 1916, in Endicott, New York. He attended high school at Union-Endicott School in the mid-1930s. Controversy arose in 1936, when other schools refused to play Union-Endicott due to questions of Battista's eligibility. He played college football at Florida, joining the school in 1937. Following his senior year of 1940, he was named to the Associated Press All-Southeastern roster. He was subsequently selected in the 1941 NFL draft by the Philadelphia Eagles, as a 7th round pick, but opted not to pursue a professional career. He spent 1941 and early 1942 as a college assistant coach. In June 1942, he was drafted to serve in World War II as part of the United States Army. He achieved the rank of lieutenant while in the Army. He also was line coach for a military service football team. In 1965, Battista, now a captain, was awarded the highest medal of honor in the country of Panama for his humanitarian services. He died on November 2, 1984, in Jacksonville, Florida, at the age of 72.
