= 1941 New York Giants season =

NFL team 17th season

- Head coach: Steve Owen
- Home stadium: Polo Grounds

Results
- Record: 8–3
- Division place: 1st NFL Eastern
- Playoffs: Lost NFL Championship (at Bears) 9–37

The 1941 New York Giants season was the franchise's 17th season in the National Football League.

== Season recap ==
Ed Danowski was lured out of retirement, Tuffy Leemans' back healed, and Mel Hein was talked out of a potential retirement. The Giants sailed through their first five games—only the Washington Redskins came within a touchdown of them as they outscored their first five opponents, 122–27. But the Brooklyn Dodgers, coached by Jock Sutherland and guided on the field by All-Pro Ace Parker, proved the Giants' most formidable opponents, dealing them two of their three defeats this year.

The Giants clinched the Eastern Division title weeks in advance of the regular season finale, but no NFL players could have been prepared for the Attack on Pearl Harbor to occur less than fifteen minutes before kickoff of week 14; the three games that day were not interrupted. At the Polo Grounds no official announcements were made, except for a page for OSS head, Col. William J. Donovan, to call his office immediately. After the game, another announcement requested that all military personnel return to their stations. A bye week was observed before proceeding to the championship game.

== Schedule ==
Game	Date	Opponent	Result	Record	Venue	Attendance	Recap	Sources
1	September 13	at **Philadelphia Eagles**	**W** 24–0	1–0	Philadelphia Municipal Stadium	25,478	Recap	
—	Bye							
2	September 28	at **Washington Redskins**	**W** 17–10	2–0	Griffith Stadium	35,677	Recap	
3	October 5	at **Pittsburgh Steelers**	**W** 37–10	3–0	Forbes Field	13,458	Recap	
4	October 12	**Philadelphia Eagles**	**W** 16–0	4–0	Polo Grounds	30,842	Recap	
5	October 19	**Pittsburgh Steelers**	**W** 28–7	5–0	Polo Grounds	34,604	Recap	
6	October 26	at **Brooklyn Dodgers**	**L** 13–16	5–1	Ebbets Field	28,675	Recap	
7	November 2	Chicago Cardinals	**L** 7–10	5–2	Polo Grounds	29,289	Recap	
8	November 9	Detroit Lions	**W** 20–13	6–2	Polo Grounds	27,875	Recap	
9	November 16	Cleveland Rams	**W** 49–14	7–2	Polo Grounds	32,740	Recap	
10	November 23	**Washington Redskins**	**W** 20–13	8–2	Polo Grounds	49,317	Recap	
—	Bye							
11	December 7	**Brooklyn Dodgers**	**L** 7–21	8–3	Polo Grounds	55,051	Recap	
Note: Intra-division opponents are in **bold** text. • September 13: Saturday night game

== Game summaries ==
=== Game 1: at Philadelphia Eagles ===
Week Three: New York Giants at Philadelphia Eagles

Quarter	1	2	3	4	Total
Giants	3	14	0	7	24
Eagles	0	0	0	0	0

at Philadelphia Municipal Stadium, Philadelphia, Pennsylvania

- Date: September 13
- Game attendance: 25,478

Game information

First quarter

- NYG Ward Cuff 19-yard FG

Second quarter

- NYG Clint McClain 1-yard run (Cuff kick)
- NYG Cuff 41-yard pass from Kay Eakin (Cuff kick)

Fourth quarter

- NYG Andy Marefos 1-yard run (Cuff kick)

=== Game 2: at Washington Redskins ===
Week Four: New York Giants at Washington Redskins

Quarter	1	2	3	4	Total
Giants	7	0	7	3	17
Redskins	0	7	0	3	10

at Griffith Stadium, Washington, D.C.

- Date: September 28
- Game attendance: 35,677

Game information

First quarter

- NYG Jim Poole 6-yard pass from Tuffy Leemans (Cuff kick)

Second quarter

- WAS Frank Filchock 67-yard blocked punt return (Bob Masterson kick)

Third quarter

- NYG Vince Dennery 65-yard pass from Andy Marefos (Marefos kick)

Fourth quarter

- WAS Masterson 10-yard FG
- NYG Cuff 14-yard FG

=== Game 3: at Pittsburgh Steelers ===
Week Five: New York Giants at Pittsburgh Steelers

Quarter	1	2	3	4	Total
Giants	3	0	14	20	37
Steelers	3	0	7	0	10

at Forbes Field, Pittsburgh, Pennsylvania

- Date: October 5
- Game attendance: 13,458

Game information

First quarter

- PIT Armand Niccolai 22-yard FG
- NYG Marefos 24-yard FG

Third quarter

- NYG Cuff 9-yard pass from Leemans (Cuff kick)
- PIT Walt Kichefski 72-yard pass from Boyd Brumbaugh (Niccolai kick)
- NYG Howie Yeager 53-yard pass from Marion Pugh (Marefos kick)

Fourth quarter

- NYG Poole 16-yard pass from Len Eshmont (Cuff kick)
- NYG Frank Reagan 21-yard run (conversion failed)
- NYG Reagan 8-yard run (Cuff kick)

=== Game 4: vs. Philadelphia Eagles ===
Week Six: Philadelphia Eagles at New York Giants

Quarter	1	2	3	4	Total
Eagles	0	0	0	0	0
Giants	7	3	0	6	16

at Polo Grounds, New York, New York

- Date: October 12
- Game attendance: 30,842

Game information

First quarter

- NYG Poole 5-yard blocked punt return (Cuff kick)

Second quarter

- NYG Marefos 38-yard FG

Fourth quarter

- NYG Yeager 39-yard run (conversion failed)

=== Game 5: vs. Pittsburgh Steelers ===
Week Seven: New York Giants at Pittsburgh Steelers

Quarter	1	2	3	4	Total
Steelers	0	7	0	0	7
Giants	0	7	7	14	28

at Polo Grounds, New York, New York

- Date: October 19
- Game attendance: 34,604

Game information

Second quarter

- NYG Frank Cope blocked punt recovery in end zone (Marefos kick)
- PIT Don Looney 66-yard pass from Brumbaugh (Jack Sanders kick)

Third quarter

- NYG Leemans 1-yard run (Cuff kick)

Fourth quarter

- NYG Marefos 1-yard run (Marefos kick)
- NYG Reagan 3-yard run (Marefos kick)

=== Game 6: at Brooklyn Dodgers ===
Week Six: New York Giants at Brooklyn Dodgers

Quarter	1	2	3	4	Total
Giants	0	10	3	0	13
Dodgers	0	7	7	6	20

at Ebbets Field, Brooklyn, New York

- Date: October 26
- Game attendance: 28,675

Game information

Second quarter

- NYG Reagan 4-yard run (Cuff kick)
- BRK Perry Schwartz 12-yard pass from Ace Parker (Bruiser Kinard kick)
- NYG Win Pedersen 27-yard FG

Third quarter

- BRK Merl Condit 20-yard FG
- NYG Cuff 15-yard FG

Fourth quarter

- BRK Pug Manders 5-yard run (conversion failed)

=== Game 7: vs. Chicago Cardinals ===
Week Nine: Chicago Cardinals at New York Giants

Quarter	1	2	3	4	Total
Cardinals	0	7	3	0	10
Giants	7	0	0	0	7

at Polo Grounds, New York, New York

- Date: November 2
- Game attendance: 29,829

Game information

First quarter

- NYG Leemans 6-yard run (Cuff kick)

Second quarter

- CHC Bob Morrow 1-yard run (Bill Daddio kick)

Third quarter

- CHC Daddio 16-yard FG

=== Game 8: vs. Detroit Lions ===
Week Ten: Detroit Lions at New York Giants

Quarter	1	2	3	4	Total
Lions	0	6	0	7	13
Giants	7	3	3	7	20

at Polo Grounds, New York, New York

- Date: November 9
- Game attendance: 27,875

Game information

First quarter

- NYG Jim Lee Howell 42-yard pass from Leemans (Cuff kick)

Second quarter

- DET Steve Belichick 8-yard run (conversion failed)
- NYG Marefos 11-yard FG

Third quarter

- NYG Cuff 30-yard FG

Fourth quarter

- NYG Leemans 2-yard run (Cuff kick)
- DET Belichick 8-yard run (Augie Lio kick)

=== Game 9: vs. Cleveland Rams ===
Week Eleven: Cleveland Rams at New York Giants

Quarter	1	2	3	4	Total
Rams	7	7	0	0	14
Giants	14	21	7	7	49

at Polo Grounds, New York, New York

- Date: November 16
- Game attendance: 32,740

Game information

First quarter

- NYG George Franck 11-yard run (Cuff kick)
- CLE Red Hickey 26-yard pass from Parker Hall (Chet Adams kick)
- NYG Leemans 17-yard run (Cuff kick)

Second quarter

- NYG Yeager 6-yard pass from Ed Danowski (Cuff kick)
- CLE Maury Patt 2-yard pass from Hall (Adams kick)
- NYG Yeager 65-yard pass from Danowski (Cuff kick)
- NYG Doug Oldershaw 26-yard interception return (Cuff kick)

Third quarter

- NYG Franck 44-yard pass from Leemans (Marefos kick)

Fourth quarter

- NYG McClain 11-yard run (Hank Soar kick)

=== Game 10: vs. Washington Redskins ===
Week Twelve: Washington Redskins at New York Giants

Quarter	1	2	3	4	Total
Redskins	0	0	0	13	13
Giants	0	0	10	10	20

at Polo Grounds, New York, New York

- Date: November 23
- Game attendance: 49,317

Game information

Third quarter

- NYG Franck 3-yard run (Cuff kick)
- NYG Marefos 23-yard FG

Fourth quarter

- WAS Bob McChesney 25-yard pass from Sammy Baugh (conversion failed)
- WAS Bob Seymour 3-yard run (Joe Aguirre kick)
- NYG Franck 7-yard run (Cuff kick)
- NYG Cuff 38-yard FG

=== Game 11: vs. Brooklyn Dodgers ===
Week Fourteen: Brooklyn Dodgers at New York Giants

Quarter	1	2	3	4	Total
Dodgers	0	7	7	7	21
Giants	0	0	0	7	7

at Polo Grounds, New York, New York

- Date: December 7
- Game attendance: 55,051

Game information

Second quarter

- BRK Manders 3-yard run (Condit kick)

Third quarter

- BRK Manders 65-yard interception return (Condit kick)

Fourth quarter

- BRK Manders 2-yard run (Condit kick)
- NYG Eakin 38-yard pass from Soar (Soar kick)

== Playoffs ==
Round	Date	Opponent	Result	Venue	Attendance	Recap	Sources
Championship	December 21	at Chicago Bears	L 9–37	Wrigley Field	13,341	Recap	

=== 1941 NFL Championship: at Chicago Bears ===
1941 NFL Championship: New York Giants at Chicago Bears

Quarter	1	2	3	4	Total
Giants	6	0	3	0	9
Bears	3	6	14	14	37

at Wrigley Field, Chicago, Illinois

- Date: December 21
- Game attendance: 13,341

Game information

First quarter

- CHB Bob Snyder 14-yard FG
- NYG Franck 31-yard pass from Leemans (conversion failed)

Second quarter

- CHB Snyder 39-yard FG
- CHB Snyder 37-yard FG

Third quarter

- NYG Cuff 16-yard FG
- CHB Norm Standlee 2-yard run (Snyder kick)
- CHB Standlee 7-yard run (Joe Maniaci kick)

Fourth quarter

- CHB George McAfee 5-yard run (Lee Artoe kick)
- CHB Ken Kavanaugh 42-yard fumble return (Ray McLean kick)

== Roster ==
1941 New York Giants final roster
Backs: 14 Ward Cuff RB/CB/K; 22 Ed Danowski RB/S; 12 Kay Eakin RB/CB/P; 2 Len Eshmont RB/CB/P; 28 Nello Falaschi RB/S; 13 George Franck RB/CB/P; 4 Tuffy Leemans FB/LB; 70 Andy Marefos FB/LB/K; 17 Clint McClain RB/CB; 25 Dom Principe RB/S; 20 Leland Shaffer RB/S; 15 Hank Soar RB/CB/K; 6 Howie Yeager RB/CB	Linemen/Linebackers: 69 Tony Blazine T/DT; 36 Frank Cope T/DT; 55 Lou DeFilippo C/LB; 60 Monk Edwards G/T/DG/DT; 11 Chet Gladchuk T/DT; 7 Mel Hein C/LB; 5 Kayo Lunday G/DG; 33 John Mellus T/DT; 39 Doug Oldershaw G/DG; 66 Win Pedersen T/DT; 44 Ben Sohn G/DG; 42 Orville Tuttle G/DG; 32 Len Younce G/DG	Ends/Receivers: 52 Vince Dennery; 49 Dick Horne; 21 Jim Lee Howell; 29 Jack Lummus; 23 Buster Poole; 24 Will Walls; Reserve: 30 Marion Pugh RB/S (Military); 8 Frank Reagan RB/CB/S/P/ (Military); 50 Ed Widseth T/DT (IR); rookies in italics

== Standings ==
NFL Eastern Division
	W	L	T	PCT	DIV	PF	PA	STK
New York Giants	8	3	0	.727	6–2	238	114	L1
Brooklyn Dodgers	7	4	0	.636	6–2	158	127	W2
Washington Redskins	6	5	0	.545	5–3	176	174	W1
Philadelphia Eagles	2	8	1	.200	1–6–1	119	218	L3
Pittsburgh Steelers	1	9	1	.100	1–6–1	103	276	L2

Note: Tie games were not officially counted in the standings until 1972.

== See also ==
- List of New York Giants seasons
