= Al Matuza =

American football player (1918–2004)

No. 15
- Position: Center

Personal information
- Born: September 11, 1918; Shenandoah, Pennsylvania, U.S.
- Died: May 16, 2004 (aged 85); Yardley, Pennsylvania, U.S.
- Listed height: 6 ft 2 in (1.88 m)
- Listed weight: 200 lb (91 kg)

Career information
- High school: Shenandoah Valley; Staunton Military Academy (Staunton, Virginia)
- College: Georgetown (1937-1940)
- NFL draft: 1940: 19th round, 179th overall pick

Career history
- Chicago Bears (1941–1943)

Awards and highlights
- 2× NFL champion (1941, 1943); Pro Bowl (1941)

Career NFL statistics
- Games played: 31
- Games started: 1
- Interceptions: 4
- Stats at Pro Football Reference

Albert Charles Matuza (September 11, 1918 – May 16, 2004) was an American professional football center. He played professionally in the National Football League (NFL) for the Chicago Bears from 1941 to 1943. He was selected in the 19th round of the 1940 NFL draft with the 179th overall pick.
