= Del Lyman =

American football player (1918–1986)

No. 15, 1, 45, 28, 2
- Position: Tackle

Personal information
- Born: July 9, 1918; Aberdeen, Washington, U.S.
- Died: December 19, 1986 (aged 68); Santa Barbara County, California, U.S.
- Listed height: 6 ft 3 in (1.91 m)
- Listed weight: 232 lb (105 kg)

Career information
- High school: Fairfax (Los Angeles, California)
- College: UCLA (1937–1940)
- NFL draft: 1941: 14th round, 126th overall pick

Career history
- Green Bay Packers (1941); Los Angeles Rams (1941, 1944); Los Angeles Bulldogs (1945)

Career NFL statistics
- Games played: 11
- Stats at Pro Football Reference

Marion Dell Lyman (July 9, 1918 – December 19, 1986) was a player in the National Football League (NFL).

== Biography ==
Lyman was born on July 9, 1918, in Aberdeen, Washington. He played football at Fairfax High School in Los Angeles and UCLA, lettering as a sophomore, junior and senior (1938–40) despite missing most of his senior season due to an appendectomy.

== Career ==
Lyman was drafted by the Green Bay Packers in the fourteenth round of the 1941 NFL draft and split that season between the Packers and the Cleveland Rams. After two seasons away from the NFL while serving in the military, he once again played with the Rams during the 1944 NFL season.
