= Bears–Packers rivalry =

National Football League rivalry

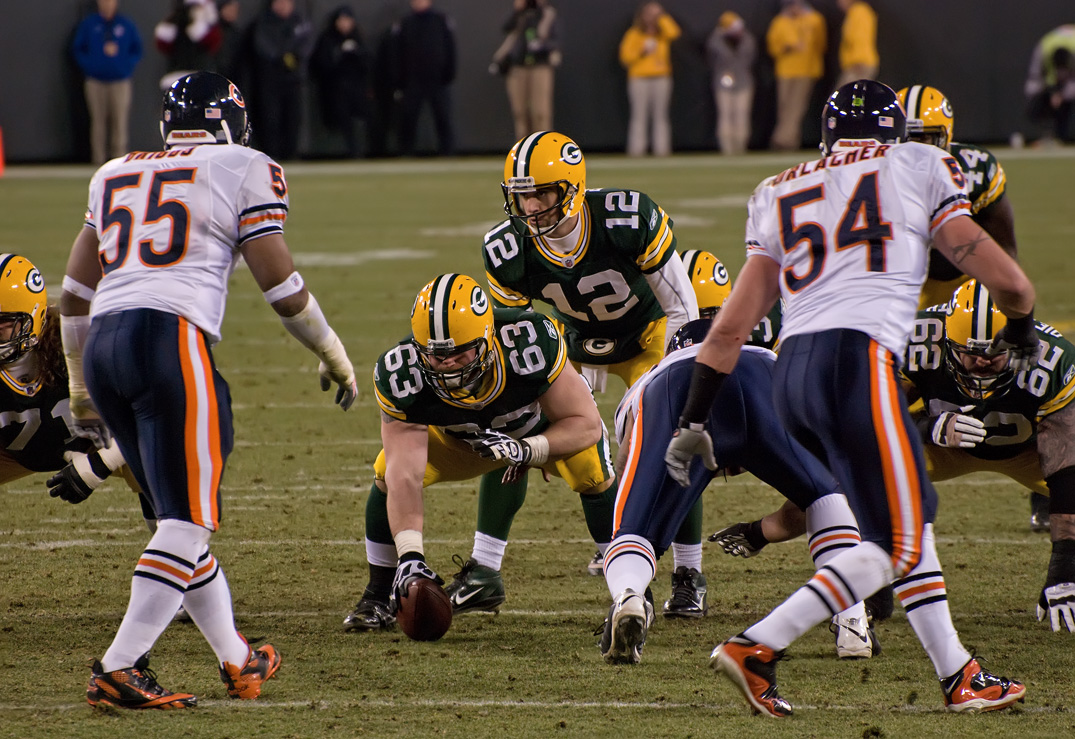
- The Bears, Lance Briggs (#55) and Brian Urlacher (#54) lining up against the Packers and Aaron Rodgers (#12) in a 2011 game

- Chicago Bears Green Bay Packers
- Location: Chicago, Green Bay
- First meeting: November 27, 1921; Staleys 20, Packers 0
- Latest meeting: October 11, 2026; Packers 31, Bears 7
- Next meeting: December 25, 2026
- Stadiums: Bears: Soldier Field; Packers: Lambeau Field

Statistics
- Total meetings: 214
- All-time series: Packers: 110–98–6
- Regular season series: Packers: 109–96–6
- Postseason results: Bears: 2–1
- Largest victory: Bears: 61–7 (1980); Packers: 49–0 (1962)
- Most points scored: Bears: 61 (1980); Packers: 55 (2014)
- Longest win streak: Bears: 8 (1985–1988); Packers: 11 (2019–2024)
- Current win streak: Packers: 1 (2026–present)

Post–season history
- 1941 NFL Western Division Playoff: Bears won: 33–14; 2010 NFC Championship: Packers won: 21–14; 2025 NFC Wild Card: Bears won: 31–27
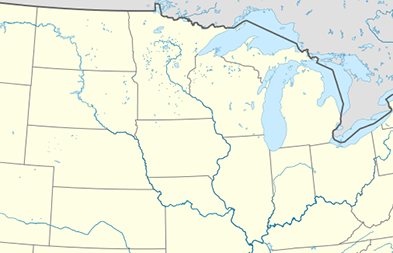

The Bears–Packers rivalry is a National Football League (NFL) rivalry between the Chicago Bears and Green Bay Packers.

The rivalry began in the 1921 season when the Packers joined the American Professional Football Association (APFA). Since then, both teams have competed against each other every season, except for the 1922 and 1982 seasons. They have faced each other at least twice in all but one non-strike season since 1924. The Bears and Packers have been in the same conference or division since the NFL adopted its conference structure in the 1933 season. They were part of the NFL's Western Conference from 1933 until 1970. Following the AFL–NFL merger, the Bears and Packers were assigned to the National Football Conference (NFC) and the NFC Central, which was later rebranded as the NFC North during the 2002 NFL season. The Bears maintained a dominant winning record over the Packers for several decades, at two times leading the series by as many as 24 games. However, due to exceptional quarterback performances from the Packers and ongoing struggles and inconsistency from the Bears, the Packers surpassed the Bears in the overall series record during the 2017 season.

Both teams began as company teams and are among the oldest franchises in the NFL. With 213 meetings, the rivalry is the league’s most-played matchup. Both franchises rank among the top five in NFL history in all-time win-loss records, and they also hold the record for the most total wins in league history. The Packers surpassed the Bears for the all-time wins lead during the 2022 season. Together, the teams have 77 inductees in the Pro Football Hall of Fame (41 from Chicago and 36 from Green Bay) and have won 22 NFL championships (13 by Green Bay and 9 by Chicago), the highest and second-highest totals in league history. They have also won five Super Bowls, four by the Packers and one by the Bears.

The Packers lead the overall series, 110–98–6. The two teams have met three times in the playoffs, with the Bears winning two of three.

== Background ==
The Bears originated in 1919 as the Decatur Staleys, a works team of the A. E. Staley Manufacturing Company. They transitioned to professional status in 1920 and became a charter member of the American Professional Football Association (APFA), which later evolved into the NFL, within the same year. In the 1921 season, the team relocated to Chicago and adopted the name Bears in the 1922 season. Similarly, the Packers were established in 1919, initially supported by the Indian Packing Company and later by the Acme Packing Company. They became a member of the APFA in 1921.

== Notable games and moments ==
=== 1920s–1950s ===
- Staleys 20, Packers 0 (November 27, 1921) – The two organizations played for the first time in 1921 at Chicago, when the Bears were named the Chicago Staleys. Bears' Gaylord "Pete" Stinchcomb scored the game's first touchdown on a 45-yard run. The Bears shut out the Packers 20–0 in their first meeting, and the rivalry was born. A year later, the Staleys changed their team name to the Bears.
- Bears 3, Packers 0 (November 23, 1924) – The Bears–Packers rivalry can be credited for the first ever ejection of players for fighting during an NFL game. The Bears' Frank Hanny and Packers' Tillie Voss were ejected before the end of the first half as verbal exchanges led to punches being thrown. Two years later, Hanny was ejected once again in a game versus Green Bay.
- Packers 7, Bears 0 (September 28, 1930) – The Packers shut out the Bears for the fifth consecutive game in this contest which is the longest such streak in the series. The streak began in 1928 when the Packers defeated the Bears 6–0 on December 9 of that season. In 1929, the Packers shut out the Bears three times, 23–0, 14–0, and 25–0 en route to their first NFL championship. On November 9, the Bears finally scored on the Packers although they came up short in the final score 13–12. The Packers then went on to win their second consecutive NFL title that season.
- Packers 7, Bears 0 (September 22, 1935) – On the first play of the game, rookie receiver Don Hutson scored on an 83-yard touchdown pass from Arnie Herber for the only score of the game. This was Hutson's first career reception and touchdown in what would become a historic Hall of Fame career.
- Bears 30, Packers 3 (September 20, 1936) – During a dominant Bears victory, Packers fan Emmett Platten, out of frustration, ran out onto the field and punched Bears lineman Ted Rosequist, believing Rosequist had committed several dirty plays on the Packers. Rosequist was knocked out by the punch and had to be removed from the game. Platten received no actual punishment for his actions, but was publicly admonished by the Green Bay Press Gazette newspaper.
- Packers 16, Bears 14 (November 2, 1941) – The Bears came into the game undefeated and seemingly invincible. Over their first five games, they defeated their rivals by an unprecedented 157 points. However, the Packers upset them in this game which was the Bears lone defeat that season. The Associated Press wrote of the game that the "Chicago Bears myth is broken". Chicago fans made accusations that the game had been fixed, and it was suggested that the Packers had employed a "secret" defensive scheme. The Packers had built a 16–0 lead through the first three quarters of play before the Bears mounted a comeback in the fourth quarter coming up just short of a win.
- Bears 33, Packers 14 (December 14, 1941) – In the first playoff meeting between the two rivals, the Bears defeated the Packers 33–14 in a one-game-playoff to determine the Western Division championship. After the Packers, the Bears defeated the New York Giants en route to their fourth NFL Championship. Until the 2010 post-season, this remained the only playoff meeting between the teams.
- Bears 52, Packers 31 (November 6, 1955) – The Bears and Packers played the highest-scoring game of their series at Soldier Field in the 1955 season. The Bears created a huge 45–3 lead, but the Packers were able to score 28 points in the fourth quarter; by the game's end, the Bears beat the Packers 52–31, with the two teams combining for 83 points. This was also the last game that George Halas coached the Bears in against the Packers until 1958 due to a temporary break from coaching.
- Packers 21, Bears 17 (September 29, 1957) – The Packers hosted the Bears in the inaugural game of their brand new stadium, initially called New City Stadium (later changed to Lambeau Field in 1965). Among the attendees to the game included NFL Commissioner Bert Bell, United States Vice President Richard Nixon, actor James Arness, and Miss America 1958, Marilyn Van Derbur. Playing behind several times during the game, the Packers finally were able to gain the lead in the 4th quarter on a 6-yard touchdown pass from Babe Parilli to Gary Knafelc for the winning points.
- Packers 9, Bears 6 (September 27, 1959) – In the debut game of new Packers head coach, Vince Lombardi, the Packers fell behind the Bears 6–0, until Jim Taylor scored on a 5-yard touchdown run, giving the Packers the lead. Dave Hanner followed the touchdown with a safety, sacking Bears quarterback Ed Brown in the Bears' endzone to cap off the victory. The Packers celebrated their first win under their new coach by carrying him off at the end of the game.

=== 1960s–1970s ===
- Packers 31, Bears 28 (November 12, 1961) – The Packers built up an impressive 31–7 lead in the game, but the Bears made a furious comeback with three unanswered touchdowns to make the score 31–28. Still, the Packers were able to win the game; they would go on to win the NFL Championship that year against the New York Giants.
- Packers 49, Bears 0 (September 30, 1962) – Vince Lombardi's Packers shutout George Halas' Bears, 49–0 at City Stadium, the Packers largest margin of victory in the rivalry. The team repeated that score against the Philadelphia Eagles six weeks later on Nov 11, 1962. The games remain a Packers team record for most points in a shutout victory. After again defeating the Bears later in the season, this time by a score of 38–7, the Packers won their 8th NFL championship. Motivated by the two humiliating losses to the Packers, Halas spent the off-season focusing on beating the Packers.
- Bears 26, Packers 7 (November 17, 1963) – The Bears and Packers, both with 8–1 records, met at Wrigley Field to play for first place in the Western Conference. Chicago, behind a dominant defense, got a 26–0 lead and held on to win 26–7, completing a sweep of the Packers in the 1963 season and handling Green Bay only two losses of the season. The Bears finished the season with an NFL championship victory over the New York Giants once again, claiming their 8th NFL Championship.
- Packers 23, Bears 12 (September 13, 1964) – Remembered as the "Free Kick Game" because the Packers invoked the surprising "Fair catch kick rule", which allows for a place or drop kick field goal attempt from the spot of a fair catch. Elijah Pitts fair caught a Bears punt on the Bears' 48-yard-line just before the end of the first half. Packers' coach Vince Lombardi opted to attempt a free kick. Confusion ensued as neither team had ever so much as even practiced a free kick. The Packers lined up at the line of scrimmage with Bart Starr holding for Paul Hornung. Hornung made the 52-yard field goal as the first half ended. The Packers stunned all in attendance with the kick and won the game 23–12.
- Bears 13, Packers 10 (November 3, 1968) – The Bears got their revenge on the Packers, beating them 13–10 on a fair catch free kick by Mac Percival at the 43-yard line after a Packers punt with 26 seconds left in the game. Percival kicked a game-winner the week before against the Minnesota Vikings.

=== 1980s ===
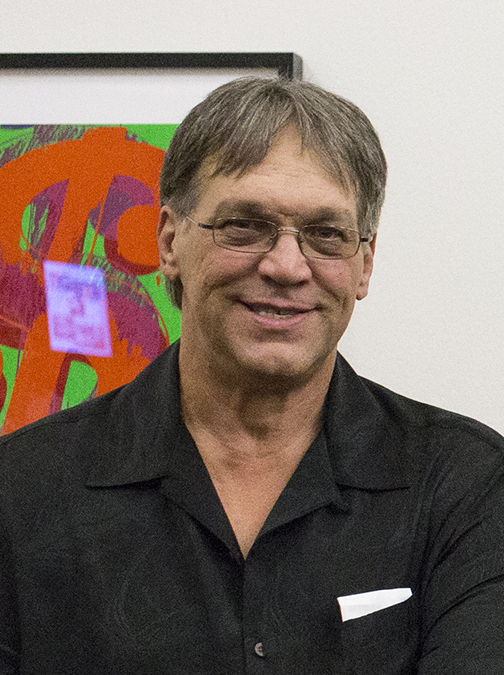
Steve McMichael, a Hall-of-Famer, spent most of his career with the Chicago Bears before concluding his time in the NFL with the 1994 season with the Green Bay Packers.

- Packers 12, Bears 6 (September 7, 1980) – Known as the Chester Marcol Game, with the score tied 6–6 and the game in overtime, Packers kicker Chester Marcol was called in to attempt a game-winning field goal. The Bears' Alan Page managed to break through and block the field goal, with the football hitting his helmet. The ball rebounded to Marcol, and, carrying the ball, he crossed the goal line to score the winning touchdown for the Packers.
- Bears 61, Packers 7 (December 7, 1980) – In the game, the Bears scored eight offensive touchdowns. After the Packers had suffered the second-most lopsided defeat in their history, Bart Starr charged across the field to confront Bears coach Neill Armstrong. Starr was upset because Bears defensive coordinator Buddy Ryan had the Bears blitzing from all angles in the fourth quarter, even after the Packers inserted backup quarterback David Whitehurst with the score 48–7. "Bart Starr was upset," Armstrong said after the game. "He did the talking and I did the listening. He said he'd rather not hear what I had to say, something to that effect, and he left." Two years later, Bill Tobin, the Bears' vice president of player personnel at the time, revealed that he had been instructed by general manager Jim Finks during the off-season to study film and decode the Packers' signal system for relaying plays to the quarterback. Tobin, who had been in the Packers' front office during the Devine years, had been fired by Starr in 1975 as part of a wholesale housecleaning. "I went at it like a tiger does good meat," Tobin said at the time.
- Bears 23, Packers 7 (October 21, 1985) – The world was introduced to rookie defensive lineman William "The Refrigerator" Perry on Monday Night Football. In goal line situations, Bears head coach Mike Ditka used Perry, who weighed roughly 300 lbs in the fullback position. Twice, Perry led the way for Bears legend Walter Payton on two- and one-yard touchdown runs. In the second quarter, "the Fridge" was given the ball and plunged into the end zone for one of the heaviest touchdowns in NFL history. The Bears won 23–7, and "The Fridge" was born.
- Bears 16, Packers 10 (November 10, 1985) – Before the game, the Packers placed horse manure in the Bears locker room. Two weeks after the Monday Night Game, tempers reached a boiling point in the rivalry. Packers cornerback Mark Lee was ejected after he and Bears running back Walter Payton went flying over a bench in the first quarter. A few minutes later, Packers safety Ken Stills was flagged for hitting Matt Suhey of the Bears well after the whistle. The very next month, the Bears would release their song The Super Bowl Shuffle (two months before they won the Super Bowl), making them the only team of any professional sport to record a US Hot 100 hit and receive a Grammy nomination.
- Bears 12, Packers 10 (November 23, 1986) – In Week 12 of the 1986 season Green Bay defensive tackle Charles Martin wore a towel with a hit list of specific Bears numbers written on it, such as No. 34 Walter Payton, No. 9 Jim McMahon, and others. Following a McMahon interception Martin came up from behind and body slammed him to the turf purposely well after the whistle separating McMahon's shoulder and ending the quarterback's season. Martin was suspended for two games, at the time the longest suspension in NFL history.
- Packers 14, Bears 13 (November 6, 1989) – This became known as the Instant Replay Game. Packers quarterback Don Majkowski led the Packers to a comeback with an apparent game-winning touchdown pass to wide receiver Sterling Sharpe. The play was called a touchdown, but line judge Jim Quirk had called a penalty on Majkowski for being beyond the line of scrimmage when he threw the pass. A nervous and tense crowd at Lambeau Field waited as the call went up to the instant replay official. Several minutes later, the call came down and the touchdown was awarded as recorded by instant replay, providing the Packers their first victory over the Bears since 1984. This led to a change in the "illegal forward pass" rule which defined when to consider a passer past the line of scrimmage. The rule used to be judged by the position of the ball instead of the passer's feet. Bears coach Mike Ditka ordered that an asterisk be placed next to the result in all team publications.

=== 1990s ===
- Packers 33, Bears 6 (October 31, 1994) – Playing with a severely bruised hip in a driving rainstorm at Soldier Field on Halloween Night, Brett Favre rushes for a career-high 58 yards – including a 36-yard touchdown in the second quarter when he leaped over a Bears defender. After the game Favre said "Maybe Gale Sayers (who had his number retired that night along with Dick Butkus) got excited about that one". With a win in that game, Green Bay began a ten-game winning streak against the Bears as Favre was considered a "Bear-killer". This game marked the beginning of two streaks in the series. The Packers won ten consecutive games in the series (which was the longest between the two clubs until 2024) and also eleven consecutive away games – a streak that did not end until the 2005 season. Throwback uniforms were worn by both teams.
- Packers 27, Bears 24 (September 11, 1995) – Packers QB Brett Favre throws a 99-yard touchdown pass to Robert Brooks – one of only 13 times in NFL history a 99-yard TD pass has ever been completed. Green Bay stormed to a 27–7 lead and had 431 yards on offense compared to Chicago's 243, Although Chicago scored 17 unanswered at the end, they came up just short as time expired. The game was featured nationally on Monday Night Football.
- Packers 35, Bears 28 (November 12, 1995) – Coming into this much-anticipated matchup, first place in the NFC Central division was on the line. A victory would give the Packers the same record as the Bears (6–4) and would mean a series sweep, giving Green Bay the head-to-head tie-breaker should the teams be tied at season's end. Brett Favre had a badly sprained ankle, which kept his status for the game uncertain. Not only did Favre start, but he had his best game of the season up to that point. He completed 25 of 33 passes for 336 yards and a career-high five touchdowns. Bears QB Erik Kramer also had a solid game, going 23 of 38 for 318 yards, two touchdowns, and one interception. The teams combined for 800 yards of offense. The game was not decided until Kramer threw an incomplete pass in the Packers' end zone on the final play of the game.
- Packers 24, Bears 23 (October 12, 1997) – In one of the more back-and-forth contests in the rivalry, the Bears got off to a 10–0 lead thanks in part to a rushing touchdown by Raymont Harris in the first quarter before the Packers came back to take a 14–10 halftime lead due to a rushing score by Dorsey Levens. In the third quarter, Erik Kramer ran for a three-yard touchdown to put the Bears back in front, 17–14. However, in the waning seconds of the third quarter, Brett Favre connected with Mark Chmura for a touchdown. The Packers led, 21–17, then extended their lead to 24–17. The Bears marched down the field and scored when Kramer connected with Chris Penn with less than two minutes left. In an "all-or-nothing" maneuver, the Bears went for a two-point conversion. The pass fell incomplete, essentially preserving the win for the Packers.
- Bears 14, Packers 13 (November 7, 1999) – The Bears defeated the Packers for the first time since 1993 on a blocked field goal by defensive tackle Bryan Robinson and was the first game in the series played after the death of Walter Payton. This was also the game in which Brett Favre surpassed Ron Jaworski's record for most consecutive starts by a quarterback.

=== 2000s ===
- Packers 34, Bears 21 (October 7, 2002) – This Monday night contest at Memorial Stadium in Champaign, Illinois, was the only Bears home game in the entire series that was played outside of Chicago. Brett Favre threw an 85-yard TD pass to Driver in the first quarter—the second longest of his career to that point (both against the Bears). At the time, Soldier Field was undergoing a major renovation; the renovated stadium would later reopen in 2003 between the Bears and Packers.
- Bears 26, Packers 0 (September 10, 2006) – In the opening week of the season, the Bears handed Brett Favre his first shutout in his 16-year career, winning 26–0 in Green Bay. The Bears' offense, criticized for being conservative, opened the game with a 49-yard touchdown pass from Rex Grossman to Bernard Berrian. This also marked the first game in which the Bears' Devin Hester returned a punt for a touchdown.
- Bears 20, Packers 17 (December 22, 2008) – The coldest game in recorded Bears history featured a temperature at kickoff of 2 degrees and −13 degrees with wind chill. The Packers traveled to Soldier Field on a Monday night, where a loss against the Bears would have ended their playoff hopes. The Bears had to rally from a 14–3 score at the half. The Bears were able to score after a turnover on a Packers punt return. The Packers were on the verge of finishing a game-winning drive when Mason Crosby's field goal attempt was blocked by Alex Brown, pushing the game to overtime. The Bears took the first possession in overtime and won the game on a 38-yard field goal by Robbie Gould.

=== 2010s ===
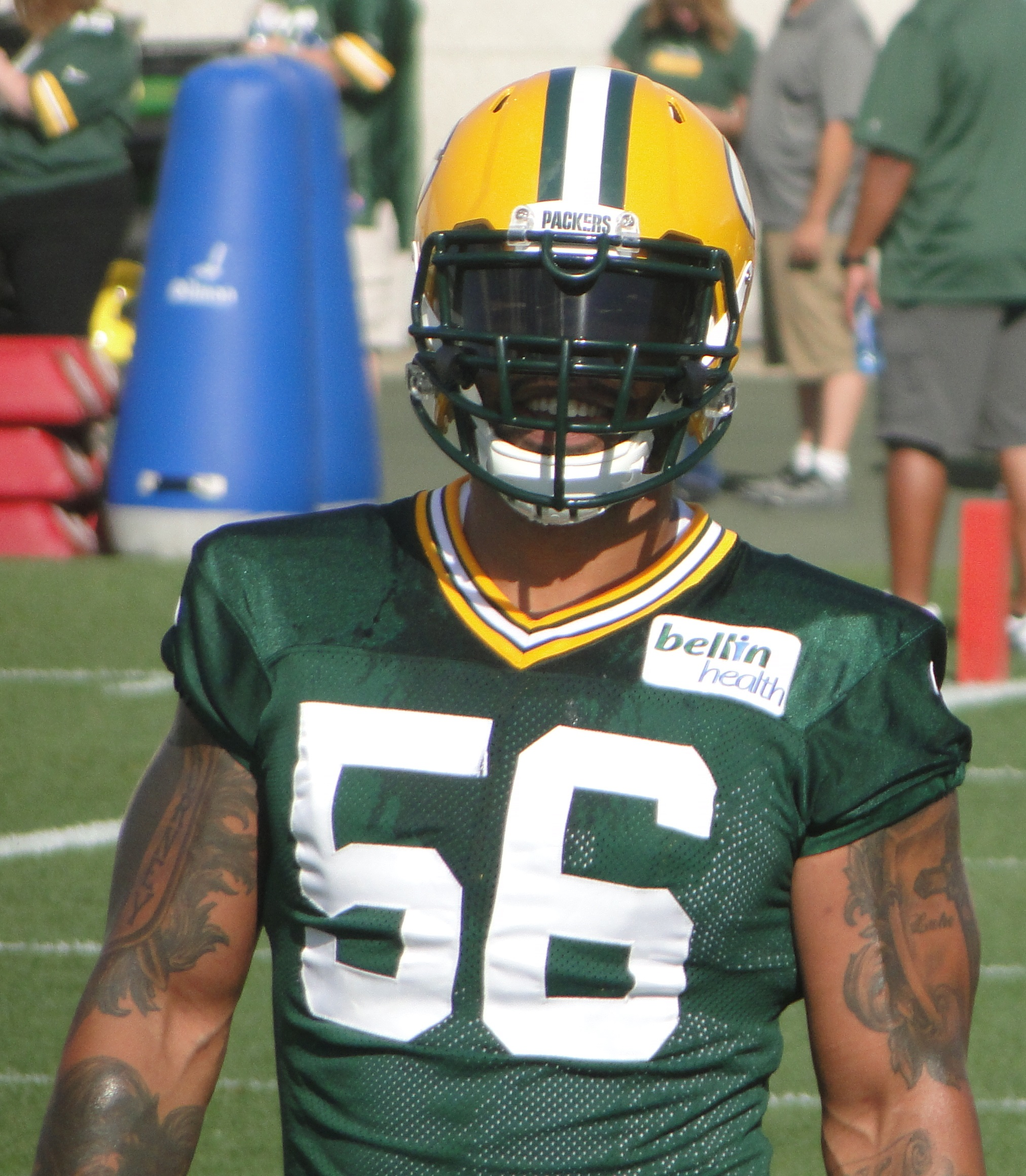
In addition to his tenure with the Carolina Panthers, Hall of Famer Julius Peppers also played four seasons with the Chicago Bears and three seasons with the Green Bay Packers during the 2010s.

- Bears 20, Packers 17 (September 27, 2010) – The 2–0 Packers traveled to Chicago for an early season showdown with the 2–0 Bears for the NFC North lead. Aaron Rodgers threw a 7-yard touchdown pass to Greg Jennings to open the scoring in the first quarter. Mason Crosby made it 10–0 with 4:45 left in the second quarter, but Jay Cutler drove the Bears down and connected with Greg Olsen for a touchdown with 31 seconds left. Late in the 3rd quarter, Julius Peppers blocked a 37-yard field goal attempt by Mason Crosby to keep it 10–7 Packers. Devin Hester then opened the 4th quarter with a 62-yard punt return for a touchdown to make it 14–10 Bears. Aaron Rodgers led the Packers on a drive that resulted in him getting into the end zone on a 3-yard scamper to make it 17–14. However, the Packers were left to regret a sloppy performance, as they recorded a team record 18 penalties. The Bears took advantage, with Robbie Gould kicking a field goal with 4:03 left and then 0:08 left to claim a 20–17 victory. This would be the last time the Bears beat the Packers at Soldier Field until the 2018 season.
- Packers 10, Bears 3 (January 2, 2011) – The 9–6 Packers hosted the 11–4 Bears in a must-win game in order to enter the playoffs. Even though the Bears had already locked up a bye and had nothing to play for, Coach Lovie Smith played all of his starters to try to prevent the Packers from making the playoffs. With both teams coming off of high scoring victories, a shoot-out was anticipated. However, the frozen tundra yielded a defensive battle, as the teams were tied 3–3 late in the fourth quarter. With 2:50 remaining, Aaron Rodgers hit tight end Donald Lee for a 1-yard touchdown pass to take a 10–3 lead. Jay Cutler led a drive for a potential touchdown, but Nick Collins intercepted him to seal the win and playoff berth for the Packers.
- Packers 21, Bears 14 (January 23, 2011, NFC Championship Game) – This was the first time the two teams had met in the playoffs since the 1941 season. The Green Bay Packers started off strong with an early 14–0 lead with Aaron Rodgers and James Starks rushing TDs. Bears' quarterback, Jay Cutler, was injured late in the second quarter, and was unable to continue. After Bears' quarterback Todd Collins proved ineffective, going 0 for 4 on two drives, the Bears brought in Caleb Hanie, who led them to a 1-yard touchdown run by Chester Taylor to make it 14–7. On the very next Bears drive, however, Hanie would be intercepted by B. J. Raji, who took it to the end zone to make it 21–7 late in the game. The Bears would answer with another TD. With one more drive to tie the game, Hanie threw his second interception, this time to Sam Shields to end the game and send Green Bay to the Super Bowl. The Packers went on to win Super Bowl XLV over the Pittsburgh Steelers, becoming the NFC's first sixth-seeded team (and second wild card team) to win the Super Bowl.
- Bears 27, Packers 20 (November 4, 2013) – Heading into this Monday Night match-up at Lambeau Field, Bears' quarterback Jay Cutler was sidelined with a groin injury. Thus, backup quarterback Josh McCown played in Cutler's stead. In the first drive of the game, Packers' quarterback Aaron Rodgers was sacked by Shea McClellin, fracturing Rodgers' left collarbone and sent him out of the game. McCown threw for 272 yards and two touchdowns, and no interceptions. Packers backup quarterback Seneca Wallace threw for 114 yards and no touchdowns, with one interception. The Bears won the game 27–20 to end a six-game losing streak to the Packers. Aaron Rodgers would be out for 7 weeks, eventually returning in Week 17 against the Bears for the NFC North title.
- Packers 33, Bears 28 (December 29, 2013) – In a game with the NFC North Championship on the line, the Packers faced off against the Bears. The game was notable for a Rodgers fumble to a touchdown that occurred when most players from both teams believed the play to be an incomplete pass. The game also showcased an offensive shootout in the second half, including Bears quarterback Jay Cutler throwing for two touchdowns. However, the Packers ended their last drive converting on 4th down three times, most notably in a long 4th and 8 completion to Randall Cobb for a touchdown that would win the game and deliver Green Bay its 3rd consecutive NFC North title and kept the Bears out of the playoffs.
- Packers 55, Bears 14 (November 6, 2014) – Aaron Rodgers tied an NFL record with 6 touchdown passes in the first half in a blowout win for the Packers, the most lopsided win for the Packers over the Bears since 1962 and their highest point total in a game since 1945. Bears' kickoff returner Chris Williams tied an NFL record with 10 kickoff returns in a game, one of which went for a 101-yard touchdown.
- Bears 17, Packers 13 (November 26, 2015) – On the night of Brett Favre's jersey retirement, the Bears met the Packers at Lambeau Field for a Thanksgiving match-up. With a 4–6 record and having lost to the Packers earlier in the year, Chicago entered the game as huge underdogs. While the Bears' offense stalled in the first quarter, the Packers took a 7-point lead on a touchdown pass from Aaron Rodgers to Eddie Lacy. In the second quarter, the Bears scored two touchdowns, while the Packers settled for two field goals, making the score 14–13 at halftime. The Bears scored one more field goal in the fourth quarter while their defense pitched a second half shutout, including a goal line stand in the game's final seconds.
- Packers 30, Bears 27 (December 18, 2016) – With Green Bay one game down in the all time head to head series, and needing a win to move within a game of the NFC North lead, they entered Soldier Field during one of the coldest Chicago Bears games on record. Tied 10–10 at halftime, Green Bay surged to a 27–10 advantage in the third quarter, before the Bears made a run of their own in the fourth quarter to bring them within 3 points and in striking distance of the Green Bay end zone. Green Bay held the Bears to a field goal after a goal-line stand. During the Packers' ensuing possession, quarterback Aaron Rodgers completed a 60-yard pass to Jordy Nelson which led to a Packers field goal as time expired.
- Packers 24, Bears 23 (September 9, 2018) – After an off-season in which both teams made massive player acquisitions, most notably the Bears having acquired linebacker Khalil Mack, the two teams met on Sunday Night Football for a highly anticipated Week 1 matchup. The Bears struck first with a 2-yard touchdown run by quarterback Mitchell Trubisky. After the two teams exchanged three and outs, Chicago ended the 1st quarter up 7–0. The Bears would later add to the lead with a Cody Parkey field goal to make it 10–0. Late in the second quarter, defensive lineman Roy Robertson-Harris knocked Aaron Rodgers out with a knee injury and the Bears capitalized with Mack getting a pick-six off Packers backup DeShone Kizer. Rodgers would return to the game in third quarter down 20–0, and led the Packers on a scoring drive culminating in a Mason Crosby field goal to end the third quarter with the Bears leading 20–3. However, the Packers outscored the Bears 21–3 off three Rodgers touchdown passes, to take a 24–23 lead with just over 2 minutes left. The Packers would hang on to win by that score. The 17-point fourth-quarter comeback for the Packers represented their largest in franchise history. However, the teams would head in opposite directions going forward.
- Bears 24, Packers 17 (December 16, 2018) – Following their Week 1 meeting, the Bears and Packers had gone in opposite directions during the 2018 season. The 5-7-1 Packers and 9-4 Bears met in Soldier Field for a Week 15 showdown with major implications in the playoff race for both teams. The Bears needed a win to clinch the NFC North, while a Packers victory would keep their slim playoff hopes alive. Led by a dominant defensive performance and two touchdown passes from Mitchell Trubisky, the Bears would win the game 24-17 (their first win over the Packers at Soldier Field since 2010) and clinched the NFC North while eliminating the Packers from playoff contention. Linebacker Khalil Mack would sack Aaron Rodgers 2.5 times while safety Eddie Jackson intercepted Rodgers late in the fourth quarter to seal the Bears victory (and also breaking Rodgers' NFL-record streak of 402 consecutive passes without an interception). The Packers would finish the season 6-9-1 (their first time since 1990–91 with back-to-back losing seasons) while the Bears would finish 12–4, losing in the Wild Card round to the Eagles in the Double Doink Game.
- Packers 10, Bears 3 (September 5, 2019) – 2019 was the NFL's 100th season. It was also the Chicago Bears' 100th season in the NFL. The NFL decided to pay tribute by deciding the match up of the first game of their season on Thursday with the NFL's longest rivalry, the Packers and the Bears at Soldier Field. The decision would break the NFL's yearly tradition of their first game being the defending Super Bowl champions at their home field which would've been the New England Patriots at Gillette Stadium since the Patriots won Super Bowl LIII the previous year. The Bears' only points in the game would be a field goal in the 1st quarter while the Packers scored a touchdown in the 2nd quarter and a field goal in the fourth quarter as the Packers won the game 10–3. The game was officially sealed when two newly signed Packers free agents, safety Adrian Amos (who was previously on the Bears) and linebacker Preston Smith made plays that ended the Bears' final two offensive drives.
- Packers 21, Bears 13 (December 15, 2019) – The Bears and Packers would meet at Lambeau Field in a Week 15 matchup that, like the 2018 matchup, would have major playoff implications for both teams. The Packers needed a win to keep their hopes for an NFC North title alive, while the Bears needed a win plus a Vikings loss to stay alive in the playoff hunt. After the Packers raced to a 21–3 lead in the third quarter, the Bears would score 10 unanswered points in the fourth quarter to cut the lead to 21–13. It took until the game's final play to seal the game, as the final play of the game was a botched lateral by the Bears that was recovered by the Packers' Tramon Williams. In a role reversal of 2018, the Packers eliminated the Bears from playoff contention with the win and clinched the NFC North a week later with a Monday Night win at the Vikings. The Packers would finish the season 13–3, falling to the 49ers in the NFC Championship Game, while the Bears finished the season 8–8.

=== 2020s ===
- Packers 35, Bears 16 (January 3, 2021) – The Packers defeated the Bears in the final game of the season to clinch the only first-round bye and home-field advantage throughout the NFC playoffs as the #1 seed. The Bears could have clinched the NFC's #7 seed and final playoff berth with a win, but were able to get into the playoffs anyway thanks to an Arizona Cardinals loss later that day.
- Packers 28, Bears 19 (December 4, 2022) – Both teams entered this game tied with the most wins all-time at 786. The Packers came away with a victory to take the all-time wins record from the Bears, who had held it since 1921. This was Rodgers' final start in the series, as he was traded to the New York Jets the following offseason. Rodgers finished with a 25–5 record against the Bears as a member of the Packers, the most wins by any quarterback against the Bears. Rodgers' career win percentage against the Chicago Bears (.833) marks the third-highest win percentage of any NFL quarterback against an individual team (minimum 27 games played), only surpassed by Ben Rothelisberger vs. the Cleveland Browns (.867) and Tom Brady vs. the Buffalo Bills (.917). Rodgers' 64 career touchdowns thrown against the Chicago Bears marks the fourth-highest total of any NFL quarterback against an individual team, only surpassed by Dan Marino vs. the New York Jets, Tom Brady vs. the Buffalo Bills, and Tom Brady vs. the Miami Dolphins, all with 72 touchdowns.
- Packers 20, Bears 19 (November 17, 2024) – The Bears were trailing 20–19 late in the fourth quarter, and were hoping to snap an 10-game losing streak to the Packers with a game-winning field goal. However, placekicker Cairo Santos' 46-yard field goal attempt was blocked by Karl Brooks as time expired.
- Bears 24, Packers 22 (January 5, 2025) – Heading into this game the Chicago Bears were at a 4-12 record, meeting at Lambeau Field against the 11-5 Green Bay Packers. The Chicago Bears gained to a quick 14-3 lead during the game with the first touchdown being scored by the bears Josh Blackwell on a 94-yard punt return touchdown, Packers quarterback Jordan Love suffered a thumb injury and had to be taken out of the game early on, with backup quarterback Malik Willis substituting in. The Packers were able to gain a one point lead even though Packers receiver Christian Watson, who was vital to the offense during the game, went down with a torn ACL injury. In a similar situation to the teams' previous meeting at Soldier Field, the Bears trailed by one point in the waning seconds of the game and hoped to snap their 11-game losing streak against the Packers (and 10-game losing streak in the season) with a game-winning field goal. This time, the Packers could not block Santos's attempt, and the ball went through the uprights to give the Bears the victory as time expired. The Packers, who had already clinched a playoff berth two weeks earlier, could have wrapped up the sixth seed with a win and a Washington Commanders loss. However, the loss guaranteed that the Packers would enter the playoffs as the seventh seed (although the loss wound up being meaningless anyways, as the Commanders would go on to win minutes after the Bears kicked the winning field goal).
- Bears 22, Packers 16 (December 20, 2025) – The Packers and Bears met at Soldier Field for a rare Saturday Night Game that would determine who controlled the division lead going forward. Although the Bears were in first place at 10–4, they had lost two weeks earlier to the 9–4–1 Packers, who were looking to sweep the Bears for the fifth time in the decade. With almost two minutes to go, the Packers were up 16–6 when Bears kicker Cairo Santos made his third field goal of the day to make it 16–9 with 1:59 left in the game. After the two-minute warning, the Bears attempted an onside kick. The kick bobbled out of the hands of Packers wide receiver Romeo Doubs and was recovered by the Bears' Josh Blackwell at the Bears 47 yard line with 1:56 left. The Bears drove to the Packers 6, and on fourth-and-goal, Bears quarterback Caleb Williams threw a touchdown pass to rookie wide receiver Jahdae Walker, who made only the second catch of his NFL career, to tie the game with 24 seconds left. A sack by Montez Sweat on Malik Willis, who was filling in for an injured Jordan Love, would force overtime. The Packers got the ball first and drove from their own 21 to the Bears 36 in just 4 plays. But on a 4th down situation, Willis fumbled the snap. Although it was recovered by teammate Emanuel Wilson, he was stopped short and the Packers turned it over on downs. The Bears got the ball on their own 36 and got to the Packers 46 in three plays, after which Caleb Williams threw a deep pass to D. J. Moore, who caught it in the end zone to seal the comeback with the final score being 22–16.
- Bears 31, Packers 27 (January 10, 2026) – The teams faced each other in the 2025-26 Wild Card playoffs. The Packers jumped out to a 21-3 lead at halftime and maintained a 21-6 lead at the end of the 3rd quarter. However, their offense could only muster up one touchdown in the second half as the Bears erupted for 25 points in the fourth quarter for a 31-27 victory. Packers kicker Brandon McManus missed two field goals and an extra point in the loss. In a viral speech after the game to his team, Bears head coach Ben Johnson yelled "Fuck the Packers! Fuck them", further igniting the rivalry between the two teams in his first season as coach.

== Playoffs ==
The Bears and Packers have made it to the playoffs in the same year six times:

- 1941: The Bears and Packers finished with identical 10–1 records (splitting the two games with each other and winning all of their remaining games) to finish tied atop the NFL Western Division. At the time, only the two division champions made it to the post-season but ties were broken with a playoff game. The Bears won the playoff game 33–14 and went on to win the NFL Championship. The teams did not meet in the playoffs again until the 2010 NFC Championship Game.
- 1994: Both teams entered the playoffs as Wild Card teams and won their respective first-round games. They each lost in the second round – Green Bay to the Dallas Cowboys and Chicago to the San Francisco 49ers.
- 2001: The Bears won the NFC Central division and clinched a first round bye as the #2 seed. The Packers were a #4 seeded Wild Card team and defeated the San Francisco 49ers in the first round. Both teams lost in the second round – Green Bay to the St. Louis Rams and Chicago to the Philadelphia Eagles.
- 2010: The two teams met on the last day of the season in what was a must-win for Green Bay. The Packers won 10–3 to clinch the 6-seed, while the Bears had already secured a first-round bye as the 2-seed. Green Bay defeated the Philadelphia Eagles and Atlanta Falcons, while Chicago defeated the Seattle Seahawks to set up the rivals' second postseason meeting in the NFC Championship Game. Many fans of both teams describe the game as the biggest in the history of the rivalry, with a trip to the Super Bowl on the line. The Packers ultimately prevailed 21–14 and went on to beat the Pittsburgh Steelers in Super Bowl XLV.
- 2020: The two teams met on the last day of the regular season in Chicago with playoff implications on both sides. The Packers won the game 35–16 to clinch the #1 seed, but the Bears were able to clinch the #7 seed thanks to an Arizona Cardinals loss to the Los Angeles Rams later that day. The Bears lost to the New Orleans Saints in the first round. Had the Bears won, they would have played the Packers in the second round. The Packers made it to the NFC Championship game, which they lost to the Tampa Bay Buccaneers.
- 2025: The Bears and Packers met on January 11, 2026, in the Wild Card Round, marking only the third playoff meeting in the history of the rivalry. The Bears faced a 21–3 halftime deficit and a 21–6 in the fourth quarter before mounting a comeback to defeat the Packers 31–27. With the victory, the Bears maintained their playoff series lead over Green Bay. Chicago would go on to lose to the Los Angeles Rams 20–17 in the Divisional Round.

== Statistics and records ==
As of January 10, 2026, there have been 213 games between the two teams—most in NFL history—since their first league game in 1921, of which Green Bay has won 109 games, Chicago 98, and 6 games ended in a tie. The largest margin of victory was a 61–7 Bears win in 1980. The longest winning streak is held by the Packers at 11 games from 2019 to 2024. After beating the Bears four times in 2011, the Packers became only the second team in NFL history to defeat the same opponent four times in one calendar year (the Los Angeles Raiders defeated the Denver Broncos four times in 1994).

== Season-by-season results ==
Chicago Staleys/Bears vs. Green Bay Packers Season-by-Season Results
1920s (Bears, 7–6–3)

Season	Season series	at Chicago Staleys/Bears	at Green Bay Packers	Overall series	Notes
1921	Staleys 1–0	Staleys; 20–0	no game	Bears; 1–0	Packers join the American Professional Football Association (APFA) (later renamed to the National Football League (NFL) in the 1922 season. Only time Packers faced the Bears under the "Staleys" name. Staleys finish with the best record of the league (10–1–1), and thus were named the APFA Champions.
1923	Bears 1–0	no game	Bears; 3–0	Bears; 2–0	Staleys rename themselves to the "Bears".
1924	Bears 1–0	Bears; 3–0	no game	Bears; 3–0	
1925	Tie 1–1	Bears; 21–0	Packers; 14–10	Bears; 4–1	Packers open City Stadium (Green Bay).
1926	Bears 1–0–2	Bears; 19–13	Tie; 6–6	Bears; 5–1–2	
1926	Bears 1–0–2	Tie; 3–3	Tie; 6–6	Bears; 5–1–2	
1927	Bears 2–0	Bears; 14–6	Bears; 7–6	Bears; 7–1–2	Bears' wins are the Packers only losses in the 1927 season.
1928	Packers 2–0–1	Packers; 16–6	Tie; 12–12	Bears; 7–3–3	
1928	Packers 2–0–1	Packers; 6–0	Tie; 12–12	Bears; 7–3–3	
1929	Packers 3–0	Packers; 14–0	Packers; 23–0	Bears; 7–6–3	Packers finished with the best record in the league (12–0–1) and thus won the 1929 NFL Championship.
1929	Packers 3–0	Packers; 25–0	Packers; 23–0	Bears; 7–6–3	Packers finished with the best record in the league (12–0–1) and thus won the 1929 NFL Championship.

1930s (Bears, 12–11–1)

Season	Season series	at Chicago Bears	at Green Bay Packers	Overall series	Notes
1930	Packers 2–1	Packers; 13–12	Packers; 7–0	Tie; 8–8–3	Packers finished with the best record in the league (10–3–1) and thus won the 1930 NFL Championship.
1930	Packers 2–1	Bears; 21–0	Packers; 7–0	Tie; 8–8–3	Packers finished with the best record in the league (10–3–1) and thus won the 1930 NFL Championship.
1931	Packers 2–1	Packers; 6–2	Packers; 7–0	Packers; 10–9–3	Packers finished with the best record in the league (12–2) and thus won the 1931 NFL Championship.
1931	Packers 2–1	Bears; 7–6	Packers; 7–0	Packers; 10–9–3	Packers finished with the best record in the league (12–2) and thus won the 1931 NFL Championship.
1932	Tie 1–1–1	Packers; 2–0	Tie; 0–0	Packers; 11–10–4	Packers' win is the Bears only loss in their 1932 season. Bears win 1932 NFL Championship.
1932	Tie 1–1–1	Bears; 9–0	Tie; 0–0	Packers; 11–10–4	Packers' win is the Bears only loss in their 1932 season. Bears win 1932 NFL Championship.
1933	Bears 3–0	Bears; 10–7	Bears 14–7	Bears; 13–11–4	Due to the popularity and success of the 1932 NFL Playoff Game, the league divided its teams into two divisions, with the Bears and Packers placed in the NFL Western Division. Last time both teams met three times during the regular season. Bears win 1933 NFL Championship.
1933	Bears 3–0	Bears; 7–6	Bears 14–7	Bears; 13–11–4	Due to the popularity and success of the 1932 NFL Playoff Game, the league divided its teams into two divisions, with the Bears and Packers placed in the NFL Western Division. Last time both teams met three times during the regular season. Bears win 1933 NFL Championship.
1934	Bears 2–0	Bears; 27–14	Bears; 24–10	Bears; 15–11–4	Bears lose 1934 NFL Championship.
1935	Packers 2–0	Packers; 17–14	Packers; 7–0	Bears; 15–13–4	Packers' home win snapped the Bears' 17-game regular season winning streak and handed them their first loss to a divisional opponent. Packers' win in Chicago snapped the Bears' 20-game unbeaten streak at home and their 18-game home winning streak.
1936	Tie 1–1	Packers; 21–10	Bears; 30–3	Bears; 16–14–4	Packers’ win handed the Bears their first loss of the season after a 6–0 start. Bears' win is the Packers' only loss in the 1936 season. Packers win 1936 NFL Championship.
1937	Tie 1–1	Packers; 24–14	Bears; 14–2	Bears; 17–15–4	Packers' win is the Bears' only regular season loss in the 1937 season. Bears lose 1937 NFL Championship.
1938	Tie 1–1	Packers; 24–17	Bears; 2–0	Bears; 18–16–4	Packers lose 1938 NFL Championship.
1939	Tie 1–1	Bears; 30–27	Packers; 21–16	Bears; 19–17–4	Bears' win is the Packers only road loss in their 1939 season. Packers win 1939 NFL Championship.

1940s (Bears, 16–4–1)

Season	Season series	at Chicago Bears	at Green Bay Packers	Overall series	Notes
1940	Bears 2–0	Bears; 14–7	Bears; 41–10	Bears; 21–17–4	Bears win 1940 NFL Championship.
1941	Tie 1–1	Packers; 16–14	Bears; 25–17	Bears; 22–18–4	Packers' win snapped the Bears' 11-game home winning streak. After that loss, the Bears went on a 21-game unbeaten streak at home, including a 17-game home winning streak. Both teams finished with 10–1 records, with their only losses coming against each other, setting up a tiebreaker playoff game.
1941 Playoffs	Bears 1–0	Bears; 33–14		Bears; 23–18–4	NFL Western Division playoff. Bears go on to win 1941 NFL Championship.
1942	Bears 2–0	Bears; 38–7	Bears; 44–28	Bears; 25–18–4	Bears' wins are the Packers only losses in the 1942 season. Bears loss 1942 NFL Championship.
1943	Bears 1–0–1	Bears; 21–7	Tie; 21–21	Bears; 26–18–5	Bears'win was the Packers' only road loss in the 1943 season. Bears win 1943 NFL Championship.
1944	Tie 1–1	Bears; 21–0	Packers; 42–28	Bears; 27–19–5	Packers win 1944 NFL Championship.
1945	Tie 1–1	Bears; 28–24	Packers; 31–21	Bears; 28–20–5	
1946	Bears 2–0	Bears; 10–7	Bears; 30–7	Bears; 30–20–5	Bears win 1946 NFL Championship.
1947	Tie 1–1	Bears; 20–17	Packers; 29–20	Bears; 31–21–5	
1948	Bears 2–0	Bears; 7–6	Bears; 45–7	Bears; 33–21–5	
1949	Bears 2–0	Bears; 24–3	Bears; 17–0	Bears; 35–21–5	

1950s (Bears, 14–5–1)

Season	Season series	at Chicago Bears	at Green Bay Packers	Overall series	Notes
1950	Tie 1–1	Bears; 28–14	Packers; 31–21	Bears; 36–22–5	As a result of the AAFC–NFL merger, the Bears and Packers were placed in the NFL National Conference (later renamed to the NFL Western Conference in the 1953 season).
1951	Bears 2–0	Bears; 24–13	Bears; 31–20	Bears; 38–22–5	Bears win 11 straight home meetings (1941–1951).
1952	Tie 1–1	Packers; 41–28	Bears; 24–14	Bears; 39–23–5	
1953	Bears 1–0–1	Tie; 21–21	Bears; 17–13	Bears; 40–23–6	As of October 11, 2026, this remains the last time both teams finished a game in a tie.
1954	Bears 2–0	Bears; 28–23	Bears; 10–3	Bears; 42–23–6	
1955	Tie 1–1	Bears; 52–31	Packers; 24–3	Bears; 43–24–6	Game in Chicago is the highest-scoring game in the rivalry (83 points).
1956	Bears 2–0	Bears; 38–14	Bears; 37–21	Bears; 45–24–6	Last meeting at City Stadium (Green Bay). Bears lose 1956 NFL Championship.
1957	Tie 1–1	Bears; 21–14	Packers; 21–17	Bears; 46–25–6	Packers open City Stadium (Milwaukee) (later renamed to Lambeau Field in the 1965 season).
1958	Bears 2–0	Bears; 24–10	Bears; 34–20	Bears; 48–25–6	
1959	Tie 1–1	Bears; 28–17	Packers; 9–6	Bears; 49–26–6	

1960s (Packers, 15–5)

Season	Season series	at Chicago Bears	at Green Bay Packers	Overall series	Notes
1960	Tie 1–1	Packers; 41–13	Bears; 17–14	Bears; 50–27–6	In Green Bay, Bears overcame a 14–0 fourth-quarter deficit. Packers lose 1960 NFL Championship.
1961	Packers 2–0	Packers; 31–28	Packers; 24–0	Bears; 50–29–6	Packers' first season series sweep against the Bears since the 1935 season. Packers win 1961 NFL Championship.
1962	Packers 2–0	Packers; 38–7	Packers; 49–0	Bears; 50–31–6	In Green Bay, Packers record their largest victory against the Bears with a 49–point differential. Packers win 1962 NFL Championship.
1963	Bears 2–0	Bears; 26–7	Bears; 10–3	Bears; 52–31–6	Bears' win in Green Bay snapped the Packers' 14-game home winning streak. Bears' wins are the Packers only losses in their 1963 season. Bears win 1963 NFL Championship.
1964	Packers 2–0	Packers; 17–3	Packers; 23–12	Bears; 52–33–6	
1965	Tie 1–1	Bears; 31–10	Packers; 23–14	Bears; 53–34–6	Bears’ win handed the Packers their first loss of the season after a 6–0 start. Packers win 1965 NFL Championship.
1966	Packers 2–0	Packers; 17–0	Packers; 13–6	Bears; 53–36–6	Packers win 1966 NFL Championship and Super Bowl I.
1967	Packers 2–0	Packers; 17–13	Packers; 13–10	Bears; 53–38–6	As a result of expansion, the two eight-team divisions became two eight-team conferences split into two divisions, with the Bears and Packers placed in the NFL Central division. Packers win 1967 NFL Championship and Super Bowl II.
1968	Tie 1–1	Packers; 28–27	Bears; 13–10	Bears; 54–39–6	
1969	Packers 2–0	Packers; 21–3	Packers; 17–0	Bears; 54–41–6	Game in Green Bay marked the 100th meeting, becoming the first series to reach this milestone.

1970s (Bears, 11–9)

Season	Season series	at Chicago Bears	at Green Bay Packers	Overall series	Notes
1970	Tie 1–1	Bears; 35–17	Packers; 20–19	Bears; 55–42–6	As a result of the AFL–NFL merger, the Bears and Packers are placed in the National Football Conference (NFC) but remain in the NFC Central (later renamed to the NFC North in the 2002 season). Last meeting at Wrigley Field.
1971	Packers 2–0	Packers; 17–14	Packers; 31–10	Bears; 55–44–6	Bears open Soldier Field.
1972	Packers 2–0	Packers; 23–17	Packers; 20–17	Bears; 55–46–6	
1973	Tie 1–1	Packers; 21–0	Bears; 31–17	Bears; 56–47–6	
1974	Tie 1–1	Bears; 10–9	Packers; 20–3	Bears; 57–48–6	Packers' home game played at Milwaukee County Stadium in Milwaukee. Although the Packers played several home games annually in Milwaukee from 1932 to 1994, this was the sole regular season matchup between the Bears and Packers held in Milwaukee.
1975	Tie 1–1	Bears; 27–14	Packers; 28–7	Bears; 58–49–6	
1976	Bears 2–0	Bears; 24–13	Bears; 16–10	Bears; 60–49–6	Bears' first season series sweep against the Packers since the 1963 season.
1977	Bears 2–0	Bears; 21–10	Bears; 26–0	Bears; 62–49–6	
1978	Tie 1–1	Bears; 14–0	Packers; 24–14	Bears; 63–50–6	
1979	Bears 2–0	Bears; 6–3	Bears; 15–14	Bears; 65–50–6	

1980s (Bears, 11–7)

Season	Season series	at Chicago Bears	at Green Bay Packers	Overall series	Notes
1980	Tie 1–1	Bears; 61–7	Packers; 12–6 (OT)	Bears; 66–51–6	In Chicago, Bears record their largest victory against the Packers with a 54–point differential and tie a franchise record for their most points scored in a game. They also finished with 594 total yards, setting a franchise record for most yards in a game. In Green Bay, Packers win on a blocked field goal returned for a touchdown in overtime.
1981	Packers 2–0	Packers; 16–9	Packers; 21–17	Bears; 66–53–6	
1982	canceled (Players' strike)			Bears; 66–53–6	As a result of the 1982 NFL players' strike, both games scheduled were canceled.
1983	Tie 1–1	Bears; 23–21	Packers; 31–28	Bears; 67–54–6	
1984	Tie 1–1	Packers; 20–14	Bears; 9–7	Bears; 68–55–6	After their loss to the Packers, the Bears went on a 11-game division winning streak and a 12-game home division winning streak.
1985	Bears 2–0	Bears; 23–7	Bears; 16–10	Bears; 70–55–6	Bears win Super Bowl XX.
1986	Bears 2–0	Bears; 12–10	Bears; 25–12	Bears; 72–55–6	
1987	Bears 2–0	Bears; 23–10	Bears; 26–24	Bears; 74–55–6	
1988	Bears 2–0	Bears; 16–0	Bears; 24–6	Bears; 76–55–6	Bears win 8 straight meetings (1985–1988).
1989	Packers 2–0	Packers; 40–28	Packers; 14–13	Bears; 76–57–6	Game in Green Bay became known as the Instant Replay Game.

1990s (Packers, 13–7)

Season	Season series	at Chicago Bears	at Green Bay Packers	Overall series	Notes
1990	Bears 2–0	Bears; 27–13	Bears; 31–13	Bears; 78–57–6	
1991	Bears 2–0	Bears; 27–13	Bears; 10–0	Bears; 80–57–6	
1992	Tie 1–1	Packers; 17–3	Bears; 30–10	Bears; 81–58–6	Packers trade for Falcons' QB Brett Favre.
1993	Tie 1–1	Bears; 30–17	Packers; 17–3	Bears; 82–59–6	
1994	Packers 2–0	Packers; 33–6	Packers; 40–3	Bears; 82–61–6	Both teams make the playoffs in the same season for the first time since the 1941 season. Both teams finished with 9–7 records, but the Packers clinched the better playoff seed based on their head-to-head sweep.
1995	Packers 2–0	Packers; 27–24	Packers; 35–28	Bears; 82–63–6	
1996	Packers 2–0	Packers; 37–6	Packers; 28–17	Bears; 82–65–6	Packers win Super Bowl XXXI.
1997	Packers 2–0	Packers; 24–23	Packers; 38–24	Bears; 82–67–6	Packers lose Super Bowl XXXII.
1998	Packers 2–0	Packers; 16–13	Packers; 26–20	Bears; 82–69–6	Packers win 10 straight meetings (1994–1998).
1999	Tie 1–1	Packers; 35–19	Bears; 14–13	Bears; 83–70–6	

2000s (Packers, 12–8)

Season	Season series	at Chicago Bears	at Green Bay Packers	Overall series	Notes
2000	Tie 1–1	Packers; 28–6	Bears; 27–24	Bears; 84–71–6	
2001	Packers 2–0	Packers; 20–12	Packers; 17–7	Bears; 84–73–6	Packers sweep the season series despite the Bears finishing with a 13–3 record.
2002	Packers 2–0	Packers; 34–21	Packers; 30–20	Bears; 84–75–6	Due to renovations being made to Soldier Field, Bears' home game was played at Memorial Stadium in Champaign.
2003	Packers 2–0	Packers; 38–23	Packers; 34–21	Bears; 84–77–6	
2004	Tie 1–1	Packers; 31–14	Bears; 21–10	Bears; 85–78–6	Bears' QB Rex Grossman makes his first start in the series. Packers win 11 straight road meetings (1994–2004).
2005	Bears 2–0	Bears; 19–7	Bears; 24–17	Bears; 87–78–6	Bears' QB Kyle Orton makes his first start in the series. Game in Green Bay was played on Christmas. Bears' first season series sweep against the Packers since the 1991 season.
2006	Tie 1–1	Packers; 26–7	Bears; 26–0	Bears; 88–79–6	Bears lose Super Bowl XLI.
2007	Bears 2–0	Bears; 35–7	Bears; 27–20	Bears; 90–79–6	Bears sweep the season series despite the Packers finishing with a 13–3 record. Last start in the series for Packers' QB Brett Favre. He finished with a 22–10 record against the Bears as a Packers quarterback. As of October 11, 2026, this remains the most recent season in which the Bears swept the Packers in the season series.
2008	Tie 1–1	Bears; 20–17 (OT)	Packers; 37–3	Bears; 91–80–6	Packers' QB Aaron Rodgers makes his debut in the series.
2009	Packers 2–0	Packers; 21–14	Packers; 21–15	Bears; 91–82–6	Bears' QB Jay Cutler makes his first start in the series.

2010s (Packers, 17–4)

Season	Season series	at Chicago Bears	at Green Bay Packers	Overall series	Notes
2010	Tie 1–1	Bears; 20–17	Packers; 10–3	Bears; 92–83–6	Packers clinch a playoff berth with their win.
2010 Playoffs	Packers 1–0	Packers; 21–14		Bears; 92–84–6	NFC Championship Game. Packers go on to win Super Bowl XLV.
2011	Packers 2–0	Packers; 27–17	Packers; 35–21	Bears; 92–86–6	Game in Green Bay was played on Christmas.
2012	Packers 2–0	Packers; 21–13	Packers; 23–10	Bears; 92–88–6	
2013	Tie 1–1	Packers; 33–28	Bears; 27–20	Bears; 93–89–6	In Green Bay, Bears linebacker Shea McClellin knocks Aaron Rodgers out of the game with a broken collarbone, which sidelines him for seven weeks. In Chicago, Rodgers returns and delivers a memorable 48-yard touchdown pass to wide receiver Randall Cobb with 45 seconds left to lead the Packers to an NFC North title.
2014	Packers 2–0	Packers; 38–17	Packers; 55–14	Bears; 93–91–6	In Green Bay, Packers score their most points in a game against the Bears as QB Aaron Rodgers ties an NFL record with 6 first-half touchdown passes.
2015	Tie 1–1	Packers; 31–23	Bears; 17–13	Bears; 94–92–6	Game in Green Bay was played on Thanksgiving Day.
2016	Packers 2–0	Packers; 30–27	Packers; 26–10	Tie; 94–94–6	
2017	Packers 2–0	Packers; 23–16	Packers; 35–14	Packers; 96–94–6	Bears' QB Mitch Trubisky makes his first start in the series. Packers take their first series lead since 1932. Packers win eight straight road meetings (2010–2017).
2018	Tie 1–1	Bears; 24–17	Packers; 24–23	Packers; 97–95–6	In Green Bay, Packers overcome a 20–0 second-half deficit. Bears clinch the NFC North and eliminate the Packers from playoff contention with their win.
2019	Packers 2–0	Packers; 10–3	Packers; 21–13	Packers; 99–95–6	Game in Chicago was the NFL Kickoff Game. Game in Green Bay marked the 200th game in the rivalry, becoming the first matchup to reach this milestone, and the Packers eliminated the Bears from playoff contention with their win.

2020s (Packers, 11–3)

Season	Season series	at Chicago Bears	at Green Bay Packers	Overall series	Notes
2020	Packers 2–0	Packers; 35–16	Packers; 41–25	Packers; 101–95–6	In Green Bay, Packers record their 100th win against the Bears, becoming the first NFL franchise to record 100 wins over two other franchises, with the other franchise being the Detroit Lions. In Chicago, Packers clinch the 1st NFC seed with their win.
2021	Packers 2–0	Packers; 24–14	Packers; 45–30	Packers; 103–95–6	Bears' QB Justin Fields makes his first start in the series.
2022	Packers 2–0	Packers; 28–19	Packers; 27–10	Packers; 105–95–6	Following their win in Chicago, the Packers surpassed the Bears as the all-time winningest NFL franchise. Final start in the series for Packers' QB Aaron Rodgers. He finished with a 25-5 record against the Bears as a Packers quarterback.
2023	Packers 2–0	Packers; 38–20	Packers; 17–9	Packers; 107–95–6	Packers' QB Jordan Love makes his first start in the series. In Green Bay, Packers clinch the final playoff berth with their win. Packers won 8 straight home meetings (2016–2023).
2024	Tie 1–1	Packers; 20–19	Bears; 24–22	Packers; 108–96–6	Bears' QB Caleb Williams makes his first start in the series. In Chicago, Packers block Bears K Cairo Santos' potential 46 yard game-winning field goal. Packers won 11 straight meetings (2019–2024). In Green Bay, Santos kicked the game-winning 51-yard field goal as the Bears snapped a 10-game losing streak, an 11-game losing streak to the Packers, record their first win against the Packers since the 2018 season, and record their only road win in their 2024 season.
2025	Tie 1–1	Bears; 22–16 (OT)	Packers; 28–21	Packers; 109–97–6	In Chicago, Bears overcame a 16–6 fourth-quarter deficit in the final five minutes of regulation to tie the game and won in overtime.
2025 Playoffs	Bears 1–0	Bears 31–27		Packers 109–98–6	NFC Wild Card Game. Bears overcame a 21–3 halftime deficit and secured their first winning streak against the Packers since 2007.
2026	Packers 1–0	December 25	Packers; 31–7	Packers; 110–98–6	Game in Chicago will take place on Christmas.

Summary of results

Season	Season series	at Chicago Staleys/Bears	at Green Bay Packers	Notes
Regular season	Packers 109–96–6	Packers 54–53–2	Packers 55–43–4	
Postseason	Bears 2–1	Bears 2–1	no games	NFC Wild Card: 2025; NFL Western Divisional: 1941; NFC Championship: 2010
Regular and postseason	Packers 110–98–6	Tie 55–55–2	Packers 55–43–4	Packers are 1–0 at Milwaukee County Stadium in Milwaukee (1974), accounted as a Packers' home game. Packers are 1–0 at Memorial Stadium in Champaign (2002), accounted as a Bears' home game.

== Players who played for both teams ==
Name	Pos.	Years with Bears	Years with Packers
Bob Jeter	CB	1971–1973	1963–1970
Steve McMichael	DT	1981–1993	1994
Mike Tomczak	QB	1985–1990	1991
Jim McMahon	QB	1982–1988	1995–1996
Edgar Bennett	RB	1998–1999	1992–1996
Jim Flanigan	DT	1994–2000	2001
John Thierry	DE	1994–98	2000–01
Rob Davis	LS	1996	1997–2007
Cedric Benson	RB	2005–2007	2012
Julius Peppers	DE	2010–2013	2014–2016
Martellus Bennett	TE	2013–2015	2017
Josh Sitton	OG	2016–2017	2008–2015
Ha Ha Clinton-Dix	FS	2019	2014–2018
Adrian Amos	FS	2015–2018	2019–2022
Jimmy Graham	TE	2020–2021	2018–2019
Equanimeous St. Brown	WR	2022–2023	2018–2021
Robert Tonyan	TE	2023	2017–2022
Marcedes Lewis	TE	2023–2024	2018–2022
Jonathan Owens	S	2024–2025	2023

== See also ==
- List of NFL rivalries
- NFC North
- Brewers–Cubs rivalry
