= Tom Dooley (American football) =

American football official (1934–2018)

- Born: September 15, 1934; Roanoke, Virginia, U.S.
- Died: May 9, 2018 (aged 83); Charlotte, North Carolina, U.S.
- Education: Virginia Military Institute
- Occupation: NFL official (1978–1992)
- Spouse: Nancy
- Children: 3

Robert Thomas Dooley Jr. (September 15, 1934 – May 9, 2018) was an American football official for 32 years with 14 of those years in the National Football League (NFL) from 1978 to 1992 as a line judge and referee. Dooley was assigned Super Bowl XV in 1981 as a line judge. In the NFL, he wore the uniform numbers 103 and 6.

== Biography ==
A native of Virginia, Dooley attended Andrew Lewis High School in Salem, Virginia where he graduated in 1952 and later attended college at the Virginia Military Institute, earning a bachelor's degree in civil engineering in 1956 and was a varsity football player. One year later, he earned a master's degree from the Georgia Institute of Technology. Between 1957 and 1960, Dooley served in the United States Air Force as a first lieutenant.

In 1960, after completing his tour in the Air Force, Dooley began a distinguished football officiating career. From 1960 to 1977, Dooley worked both junior high and high school football games and also officiated college football games from 1966 to 1977 in the Southern Conference.

Dooley was selected to join the NFL in 1978 as a line judge before being promoted to the referee position following his appearance at Super Bowl XV for the start of the 1981 NFL season. Beginning with his Super Bowl paycheck, Dooley signed away nearly every paycheck he received from the NFL for the next 14 years, which was an amount in excess of $500,000 to a scholarship fund he created at Virginia Military Institute called "Matthew 25", named after the Biblical passage. Dooley retired from the NFL following the 1992 season in order to spend more time with his family, but continues to supply funds to the scholarship with the checks he receives from his work mediating and arbitrating construction-related problems.

Outside of the NFL, Dooley founded a company, R.T. Dooley Construction in 1977 based out of Charlotte, North Carolina. It specializes in commercial and medical buildings in North Carolina and South Carolina and has a staff of more than 100 employees. R.T. Dooley Construction made a policy to give a financial contribution every year to employees and other organizations.

Tom was married to Nancy and had three children, Nina, Bob, and David and lived in Charlotte, North Carolina. But now he was known as grandfather to his eight granddaughters.

== Memorable games ==
- Dooley was the referee in the Instant Replay Game between the Chicago Bears and Green Bay Packers at Lambeau Field in which Green Bay appeared to tie the game towards the end of the game on a Don Majkowski touchdown pass. Majkowski was penalized by Dooley's line judge, Jim Quirk, for being across the line of scrimmage when he threw that pass, a violation of the rules, which would have nullified the touchdown and given the ball to Chicago since it was fourth down and the penalty included loss of down. The penalty call was reversed by the instant replay official who concluded the ball was not across the line of scrimmage when it was released. The touchdown was allowed and Green Bay won the game 14–13. The game would later become known in NFL lore as "The Instant Replay Game". The call so infuriated the Bears that they note the game with an asterisk in their media guide.
- In another 1989 regular season game, Dooley was referee in a game between the Denver Broncos and Cleveland Browns at Cleveland Stadium, home of the infamous "Dawg Pound". The Dawg Pound rowdiness had a concrete impact on the outcome of a game. In the fourth quarter, a rain of dog bones, batteries, rocks and eggs coming down from the bleachers and was endangering the safety of the players. Dooley stopped the game and told Denver quarterback John Elway to take his team to the other end of the field, away from the east end where the Dawg Pound was located. Since there was a crosswind blowing, there was no real advantage from the wind to either team. At the end, Cleveland kicked a field goal to win.

== Awards ==
- NASO Gold Whistle Award, 2000
- 2010, For setting a faith-based example and giving back to the community, the YMCA of Greater Charlotte is honoring Tom Dooley with its John R. Mott Award. The honor is named for the Nobel Peace Prize winner who championed the cause of displaced prisoners in both World Wars.
