= Chester Marcol Game =

Notable American football game

Chicago Bears (0–0)	Green Bay Packers (0–0)
6	12
Head coach: Neill Armstrong	Head coach: Bart Starr
	1	2	3	4	OT	Total
CHI	3	0	3	0	0	6
GB	0	6	0	0	6	12
- Date: September 7, 1980
- Stadium: Lambeau Field; Green Bay, Wisconsin, U.S.
- Favorite: Bears by 6 pts
- Attendance: 54,381

TV in the United States
- Network: CBS
- Announcers: Lindsey Nelson and Sonny Jurgensen

The Chester Marcol Game was a National Football League (NFL) game between the Chicago Bears and Green Bay Packers on September 7, 1980, at Lambeau Field, in Green Bay, Wisconsin, United States. In the first game of the regular season, the teams tied 6–6 at the end of the fourth quarter sending the game went into overtime. In the extra period, Packers' kicker Chester Marcol attempted what would have been a game-winning field goal, although the attempt was blocked by Bears' player Alan Page. However, the ball bounced right back to Marcol, who caught it and ran 25 yards for the walk-off touchdown. The victory gave the Packers an early boost in the 1980 NFL season, although the Bears exacted revenge later that season with a 61–7 victory in Chicago. The Bears–Packers rivalry is one of the longest and most storied in NFL history, although at the time it had been dominated by the Bears, who had won seven of their last eight match-ups against the Packers before this game. Even though it was a low-scoring game, early in a season where neither team made the playoffs, the game became notable due to the Packers' improbable and dramatic victory, and as part of the team's rivalry. Many years later, the game gained additional notoriety after Marcol revealed his addiction to cocaine, which included using the drug during halftime prior to his game-winning touchdown.

== Background ==
Both the Chicago Bears and Green Bay Packers struggled through the 1970s, with the Bears making the playoffs twice and the Packers just once. The team's historic rivalry was fairly even that decade as well, with the Bears winning 11 out of 20 match-ups. Coming into the 1980 NFL season though, the Bears had won seven of the last eight games against the Packers. This included a series sweep in the 1979 NFL season, when the Bears went 10–6 and made the play-offs as a Wild Card team, where they lost to the Philadelphia Eagles 27–17. The Packers on the other hand had a difficult season, going 5–11 and missing the playoffs for the seventh straight season. The Bears and Packers were scheduled to play each other twice in the 1980 season, first in Week 1 and then again in Week 14. The Week 1 match-up was to be played at Lambeau Field, the Packers' home, while the Week 14 game was scheduled for Soldier's Field, the Bears' home.

=== Chester Marcol ===
Chester Marcol was drafted by the Packers in the second round of the 1972 NFL draft. During his rookie season, he led the league in scoring and was named NFC Rookie of the Year by two organizations, received an All-Pro designation by the Associated Press, and was voted to the Pro Bowl. In his rookie year, the Packers beat the Bears twice on Marcol field goals. In 1974, Marcol again led the league in scoring, was named an All-Pro, and made the Pro Bowl. Going into the 1980 season, Marcol had been the Packers' primary kicker for eight seasons, appearing in 97 games, and was again projected to be the team's kicker that year.

== Game summary ==
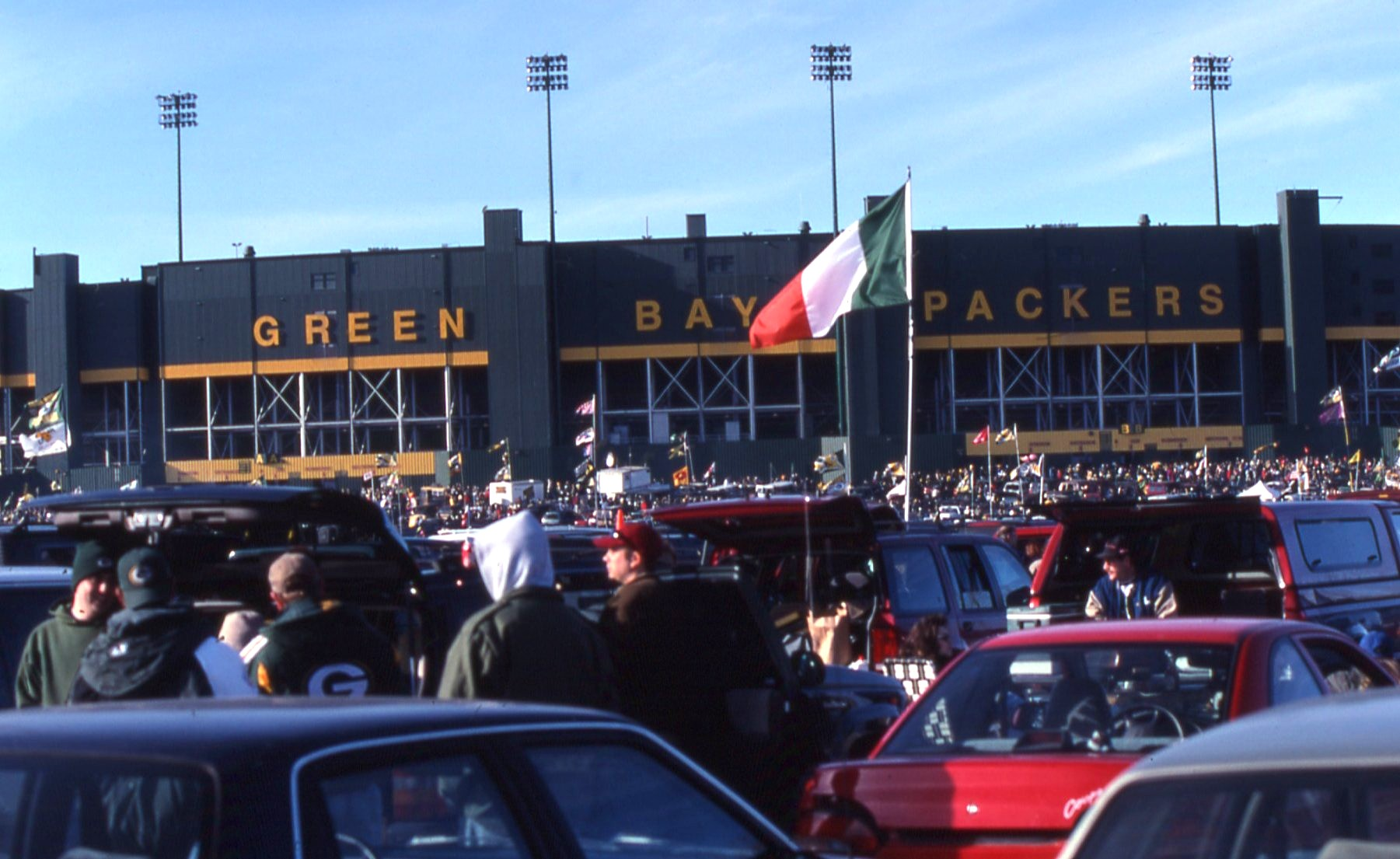
Lambeau Field, shown here in 1998, was the site of the game.

The Bears scored on their first possession of the game on a 42-yard field goal by Bob Thomas; the Bears converted two short third downs to keep the 13-play, 53-yard drive going. In the second quarter, the Packers tied the game 3–3 on a field goal of their own by Chester Marcol. On that drive, Eddie Lee Ivery ran for 23 yards and Lynn Dickey completed passes to James Lofton and Ivery to go 56 yards in 9 plays. Later in the quarter, the Packers drove 47 yards on 4 plays to get into field goal range before the end of the half. Dickey's screen pass to Aundra Thompson for 25 yards was the key play to put the Packers in range. Marcol converted the 46-yard field goal as the first half game clock expired, giving the Packers a 6–3 lead. The only score of the second half occurred in the third quarter, with the Bears converting a 34-yard field goal to tie the game at 6–6. Neither team scored in the fourth quarter, which sent the game into overtime.

Chicago received the kickoff in overtime, but was unable to move the ball, with three penalties pushing them back against their goal line. The Bears punted to midfield and on the first Packers' play, Lofton caught a pass from Dickey for 32 yards. A few plays later, Marcol stepped out onto the field for the game winning 34-yard field goal attempt. The Bears' Alan Page blocked the kick with his helmet, but the ball bounced right back to Marcol who ran to his left for a 25-yard touchdown on the recovery. The Packers won the game 12–6.

=== Box score ===
Chicago Bears vs. Green Bay Packers – Game summary

Quarter	1	2	3	4	OT	Total
Bears	3	0	3	0	0	6
Packers	0	6	0	0	6	12

at Lambeau Field, Green Bay, Wisconsin

- Game time: 1:00 p.m. CST
- Game weather: 65 °F (18 °C), wind 5 mph
- Game attendance: 54,381
- TV: CBS
- Sources: Pro-Football-Reference.com and the Green Bay Press-Gazette

Game information

First quarter

- CHI – Bob Thomas 42-yard field goal, 4:41. Bears 3–0. Drive: 13 plays, 53 yards.

Second quarter

- GB – Chester Marcol 41-yard field goal, 12:39. Tied 3–3. Drive: 9 plays, 56 yards.
- GB – Chester Marcol 46-yard field goal, 0:00. Packers 6–3. Drive: 4 plays, 47 yards.

Third quarter

- CHI – Bob Thomas 34-yard field goal, 11:23. Tied 6–6. Drive: 10 plays, 47 yards.

Fourth quarter

- No scoring

Overtime

- GB – Chester Marcol 25-yard blocked field goal return (no extra point), 0:00. Packers 6–3. Drive: 5 plays, 26 yards.

Chicago Bears stats

Passing

- Mike Phipps – 17/30, 174 yards, 3 interceptions

Rushing

- Walter Payton – 31 rushes, 65 yards
- Dave Williams – 7 rushes, 19 yards
- John Skibinski – 5 rushes, 17 yards

Receiving

- James Scott – 5 receptions, 59 yards
- Brian Baschnagel – 5 receptions, 58 yards
- Walter Payton – 4 receptions, 38 yards
- Mike Cobb – 2 receptions, 16 yards
- John Skibinski – 1 receptions, 3 yards
Green Bay Packers stats

Passing

- Lynn Dickey – 10/22, 138 yards, 1 interception

Rushing

- Eddie Lee Ivery – 15 rushes, 73 yards
- Terdell Middleton – 7 rushes, 16 yards
- Steve Atkins – 6 rushes, 9 yards
- Aundra Thompson – 1 rush, 16 yards
- Lynn Dickey – 1 rush, 0 yards

Receiving

- James Lofton – 5 receptions, 77 yards
- Paul Coffman – 3 receptions, 32 yards
- Aundra Thompson – 1 reception, 21 yards
- Terdell Middleton – 1 reception, 8 yards

=== Analysis ===
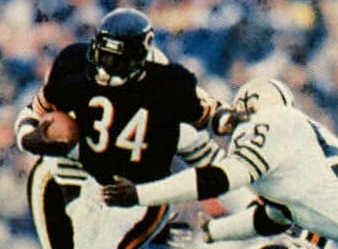
The Packers' defense limited Walter Payton, shown here in 1986, to just 2.1 yards per rush during the game.

Post-game analysis focused on the Packers' improbable victory, Chester Marcol's heroics on the last play, and the play of both defenses. The Packers took advantage of their defensive stop and penalties by the Bears during overtime, which gave them good field position and allowed the offense to gain enough yards to kick a relatively short field goal for the victory. However, the block of the field goal initially flipped the momentum, with most blocked field goals either going backward for a change of possession, or even giving he defensive team an opportunity to score. Page, who blocked the field goal, claimed after the game that he predicted that he would block the kick. However, improbably, the ball bounced directly back to Marcol, who was able to take advantage and score the winning touchdown. Multiple newspapers characterized the ending as lucky for the Packers (or unlucky for the Bears), with newspapers describing it as a "freak finish", "improbable", and calling it "sandlot play". This was not the only unlucky play of the game for the Bears, as one of the team's interceptions came off of a ricochet off a helmet. Regardless, the victory was characterized as a huge upset for the Packers and deflating for the Bears.

Both teams' defensives shined during the game, as the Bears gained just 268 yards, while the Packers only had 214. There were five turnovers during the game, which limited the scoring opportunities for each team, while both teams were heavily penalized throughout. The Packers defensive performance though included two key achievements that helped give the team the edge in the end: winning the turnover battle 4-to-1 and forcing the Bears into bad field position. The Packers defensive also held Walter Payton to just 2.1 yards per rush, with his 31 carries only going for 65 yards. The Green Bay Press-Gazette noted that the Packers' gameplan centered on stopping Payton, calling the overall effort a "sterling defensive performance". This included a key stop of Payton for a 10-yard loss on fourth down, which caused a turnover on downs. The Bears kept to Payton's run style, which focused more on outside runs, instead of trying to exploit the Packers' weakness on the inside of the defensive line. On the other side, the Bears defense kept Lynn Dickey in check; Dickey threw for just 138 yards, no touchdowns, and 1 interception, while completing less than 50% of his passes. However, Dickey was able to convert two key passes in overtime to get the Packers into field goal range. Eddie Lee Ivery, who suffered an injury during the game, was able to generate some offense for the Packers, rushing for 73 yards on 15 carries, but the rest of the Packers were less successful, rushing for a combined 41 yards on 15 rushes. The Green Bay Press-Gazette also highlighted the play of Packers' center Larry McCarren, who was injured and originally was not even supposed to play in the game, and defensive back Steve Luke, who had 10 tackles.

== Outcome ==
Despite winning their first game, the Packers ended the season with a record of 5–10–1, including losing their last four games of the season. The Bears only faired a bit better, ending the season with a record of 7–9. The Bears did exact some level of revenge in Week 14, blowing the Packers out 61–7 in Chicago. The margin of victory was the largest in Bears' history over the Packers, and one of the worst in Packers' history against any team. Just a month after his improbable touchdown, the Packers released Marcol, publicly stating that his short kick-offs were the reason, although Marcol believed it had more to do with his drug use. Marcol signed with the Houston Oilers to fill in for the team's injured kicker; Marcol's only game for the Oilers that season came against the Packers, where he made one field goal but missed two extra points. Neither the Packers nor the Bears made the playoffs that season.

=== Legacy ===
The game is a notable part of the Bears–Packers rivalry, which is one of the oldest and most storied rivalries in NFL history. Although ultimately inconsequential to the final standings for either team, who both failed to make the playoffs that season, the game is still identified as an important part of each team's history. Over the years, multiple sources have identified the game or Marcol's touchdown as notable, both in the history of the Packers and as an important part of the rivalry between the Bears and Packers. In 2020, the Milwaukee Journal Sentinel identified the game as one of the greatest sports moments in Wisconsin history, while the The Reporter called Marcol's touchdown "one of the most memorable plays in Packers history". Although exact statistics on the topic are not complete, it is likely the only game in Packers' history to end with a walk-off touchdown for the offensive team after a blocked field goal.

In 2011, Marcol released his autobiography titled Alive and Kicking: My Journey Through Football, Addiction and Life. In it, Marcol recounted his substance abuse during his time in the NFL, which included alcohol and cocaine, the latter of which he had only first tried a week before the Bears game. In describing his famous touchdown, he admitted that at halftime he went into the bathroom and snorted cocaine. Marcol stated "I don't know if it would be accurate to say I was high when I scored that touchdown two hours later, but I definitely was under the influence." After finishing the season with the Oilers, Marcol never returned to the NFL. In 1986, Marcol attempted suicide, causing long-term health issues. In 1987, the team inducted Marcol inducted into the Green Bay Packers Hall of Fame. Until the early 2000s, Marcol struggled with his substance abuse, although by 2007 he had "straightened out" and began training to become a substance abuse counselor. After recovery from his addictions, he was hired as a drug and alcohol counselor.

== See also ==
- List of nicknamed NFL games and plays
