= 2010 NFC Championship Game =

2011 American football postseason game

Green Bay Packers (6) (10–6)	Chicago Bears (2) (11–5)
21	14
Head coach: Mike McCarthy	Head coach: Lovie Smith
	1	2	3	4	Total
GB	7	7	0	7	21
CHI	0	0	0	14	14
- Date: January 23, 2011
- Stadium: Soldier Field; Chicago, Illinois, U.S.
- Favorite: Packers by 3.5
- Referee: Terry McAulay
- Attendance: 62,377

TV in the United States
- Network: Fox
- Announcers: Joe Buck, Troy Aikman, Pam Oliver and Chris Myers

The 2010 National Football Conference (NFC) Championship Game was an American football game played between the Green Bay Packers and the Chicago Bears on January 23, 2011, at Soldier Field in Chicago, Illinois, United States. Even though the Bears–Packers rivalry is one of the longest and most storied rivalries in National Football League (NFL) history, the two teams had only ever met in the postseason once, in 1941. The Packers and Bears, who both play in the NFC North division, battled throughout the regular season for the division title. The Bears pulled away late in the season to secure the title and the second seed in the playoffs. The Packers secured a Wild Card berth and beat the Philadelphia Eagles and Atlanta Falcons to advance to the NFC Championship Game. The Bears had a first-round bye before beating the Seattle Seahawks in the Divisional round. With their higher seeding, the Bears hosted the Packers at Soldier Field for the NFC Championship Game.

Although the Packers took an early 14–0 lead, the game became a defensive struggle, with each team combining for 17 punts and five interceptions. After Bears' quarterback Jay Cutler was injured, back-up Todd Collins was put in but was not effective. The Bears then put in Caleb Hanie, their third-string quarterback, who led the offense on a touchdown drive to bring the score to 14–7. After a Packers punt, Hanie threw a short pass that was intercepted by B. J. Raji, who returned it for a touchdown. Hanie led another touchdown drive and the Bears defense forced another punt by the Packers, giving them an opportunity to score a touchdown to tie or take the lead late in the fourth quarter. However, Hanie threw a second interception, this time to Sam Shields, that effectively ended the game. The Packers advanced to Super Bowl XLV, where they beat the Pittsburgh Steelers to secure their 13th championship in team history.

== Background ==
The Green Bay Packers began the 2010 NFL season having reached the playoffs in the previous season, before losing to the Arizona Cardinals in a Wild Card game. The Packers started 2010 with a record of 3–3, which included a loss to the Chicago Bears in Week 3 and two other overtime losses. They then went on a four-game winning streak, before losing three of four games to bring their record to 8–6. Needing to win their last two games of the year to make the postseason, the Packers blew-out the New York Giants and then beat the Bears in the last game of the season to secure the sixth seed in the playoffs. The Packers offense and defense ranked in the top 10 in yards and points. The Packers travelled to play the Philadelphia Eagles in the Wild Card round, beating them 21–16. In the Divisional Round, the Packers blew-out the Atlanta Falcons 48–21 to advance to the NFC Championship Game.

The Bears went 7–9 in the 2009 and had not made the playoffs for the previous three years. The Bears won the first three games of the season, before losing three out of four. The Bears then went 7–2 over the remaining nine games of the season, including a five-game win streak and the aforementioned loss to the Packers in the last game of the regular season. With their 11–5 record, the Bears beat-out the Packers for the NFC North division title; they were given the second seed in the playoffs, behind the first-seeded Falcons. The Bears were led by their defense, which was ranked in the top five in points allowed, as well as the being the second best team against the run. The Bears had a bye week in the first round of the playoffs, before hosting the Seattle Seahawks in the Divisional round; the Bears advanced to the NFC Championship Game after beating the Seahawks 35–24. With their higher seeding, the Bears were scheduled to host the Packers at Soldier Field in Chicago, Illinois, for the NFC Championship Game on January 23, 2011; the Packers were 3.5 point favorites.

== Game summary ==
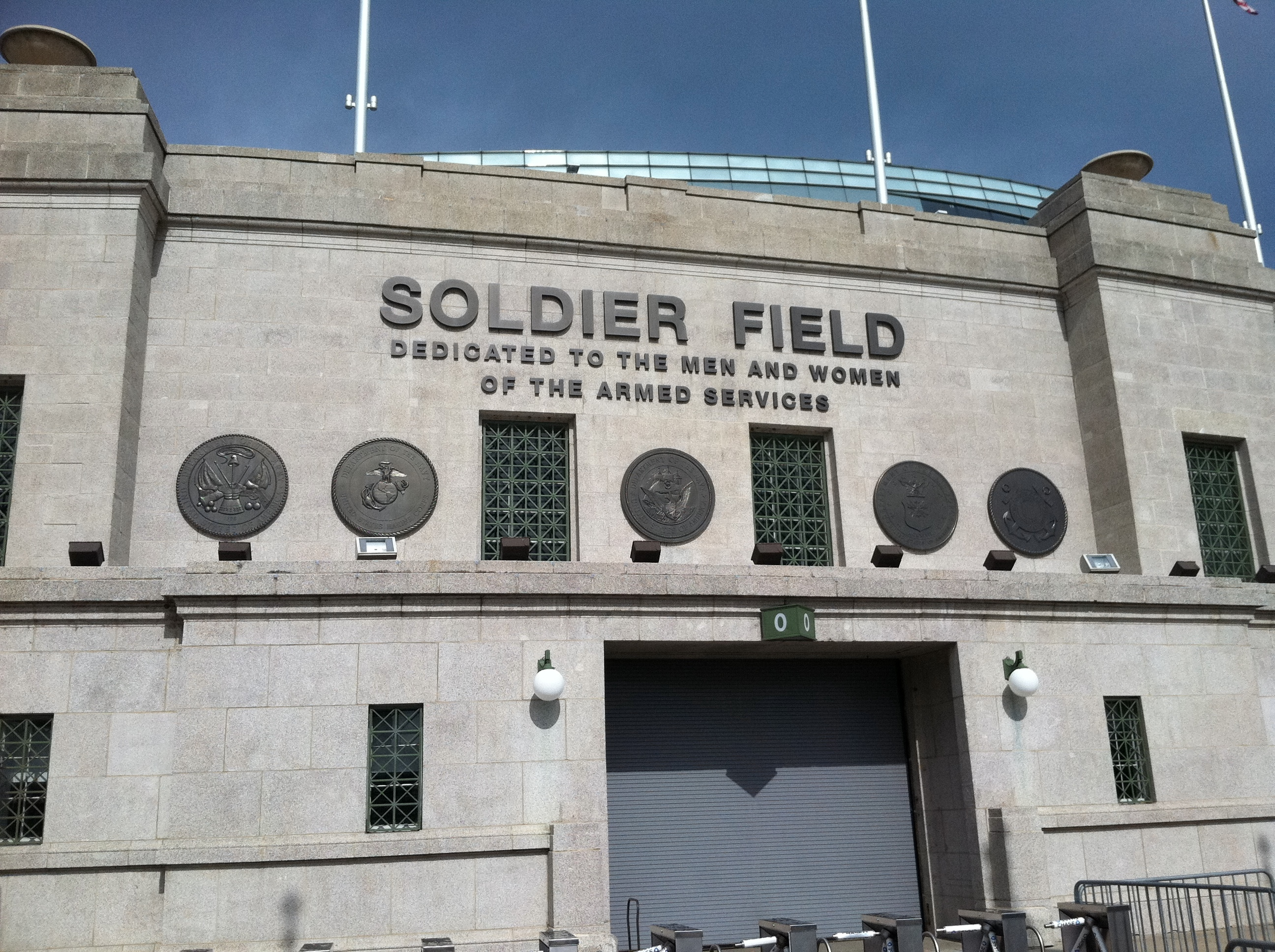
Soldier Field was the site of the 2010 NFC Championship Game.

=== First half ===
The Bears won the coin toss and elected to defer their decision to the second half. Because the Bears deferred, the Packers were given the option to kickoff or receive the kickoff. The Packers began the game with possession of the ball after receiving the kickoff. On the first two plays of the drive, Rodgers completed passes of 22 and 26 yards to Greg Jennings. After two short plays, Rodgers completed a 22-yard pass to Jordy Nelson. On the next play, Rodgers ran in a one-yard touchdown to give the Packers a 7–0 lead. The next five consecutive drives, three by the Bears and two by the Packers, ended in punts. After taking possession at mid-field, the Packers drove 49 yards in 5 plays, capped off by a four-yard rushing touchdown by James Starks to increase their lead to 14–0. Three more drives, two by the Bears and one by the Packers, ended in punts. The Packers drove to mid-field on their next drive, before Rodgers threw a pass intended for Donald Driver that was intercepted by Lance Briggs. Just one play later, Jay Cutler threw a deep pass towards Johnny Knox that was intercepted by Sam Shields. The play was reviewed to verify whether the pass was intercepted and the call on the field was confirmed; Cutler was injured on the play. The Packers kneeled the ball to run out the rest of the game clock in the first half.

=== Second half ===
The Bears started the second half with the ball, but went three-and-out and punted. The Packers drove down the field to the six-yard line, before Rodgers threw a pass that was intercepted by Brian Urlacher, who returned the ball to mid-field. Rodgers was able to tackle Urlacher, preventing a possible defensive touchdown. The Bears again went three-and-out, this time with Collins in as quarterback for Cutler, whose earlier knee injury ended up keeping him out for the rest of the game. The drive included an interception by the Packers that was reversed via instant replay. On the next drive, the Packers punted to the Bears, who went three-and-out again. After a Bears' punt, the Packers then went three-and-out. The Bears replaced Collins for Caleb Hanie, who then led the Bears on an eight-play, 67-yard drive that ended in a short touchdown run to bring the score to 14–7. The next three drives, two by the Packers and one by the Bears, ended in punts after short drives. The Bears took over on their own 10-yard line; after a short rush by Matt Forte, Hanie threw a short pass that was intercepted by B. J. Raji and returned for a touchdown, increasing the Packers lead to 21–7. The Bears got the ball, down by two touchdowns with six minutes left in the game. Hanie led a quick scoring drive, capped by a 35-yard touchdown pass to Bennett. With a little over four-and-a-half minutes left in the game, the Bears kicked the ball off to the Packers. However, the Packers went three-and-out while moving backwards one yard on the drive. The Bears took over after the Packers punt with almost three minutes left in the game, down 21–14, needing a touchdown to tie or win. The Bears drove 44 yards to the Packers 29-yard line; on fourth down and five yards to go, with under a minute left in the game, Hanie threw a deep pass that was intercepted by Sam Shields. Rodgers and the Packers' offense came onto the field and knelt down once to end the game.

=== Box score ===
NFC Championship Game – Green Bay Packers vs Chicago Bears – Game summary

Quarter	1	2	3	4	Total
Packers	7	7	0	7	21
Bears	0	0	0	14	14

at Soldier Field, Chicago, Illinois

- Date: January 23, 2011
- Game time: 3:05 p.m. EST/2:00 p.m. CST
- Game weather: 20 °F (−7 °C), wind at 14 miles per hour (23 km/h)
- Game attendance: 62,377
- Referee: Terry McAulay
- TV announcers (Fox): Joe Buck, Troy Aikman, Pam Oliver, and Chris Myers
- Pro-Football-Reference.com and ESPN.com

Game information

First quarter

- GB – Aaron Rodgers 1-yard run (Mason Crosby kick), 10:50. Packers 7–0. Drive: 7 plays, 84 yards, 4:10.

Second quarter

- GB – James Starks 4-yard run (Mason Crosby kick), 11:13. Packers 14–0. Drive: 5 plays, 44 yards, 2:53.

Third quarter

- No scoring plays.

Fourth quarter

- CHI – Chester Taylor 1-yard run (Robbie Gould kick), 12:02. Packers 14–7. Drive: 8 plays, 67 yards, 3:55.
- GB – B. J. Raji 18-yard interception return (Mason Crosby kick), 6:04. Packers 21–7.
- CHI – Earl Bennett 35-yard pass from Caleb Hanie (Robbie Gould kick), 4:43. Packers 21–14. Drive: 4 plays, 60 yards, 1:21.

Green Bay Packers stats

Passing

- Aaron Rodgers – 17/30, 244 yards, 2 interceptions

Rushing

- James Starks – 22 rushes, 74 yards, 1 touchdown
- Aaron Rodgers – 7 rushes, 39 yards
- Brandon Jackson – 2 rushes, 5 yards
- John Kuhn – 1 rush, 2 yards

Receiving

- Greg Jennings – 8 receptions, 130 yards
- Jordy Nelson – 4 receptions, 67 yards
- Brandon Jackson – 1 reception, 16 yards
- James Jones – 1 reception, 10 yards
- Donald Driver – 1 reception, 9 yards
- John Kuhn – 1 reception, 6 yards
- James Starks – 1 reception, 6 yards
Chicago Bears stats

Passing

- Caleb Hanie – 13/20, 153 yards, 1 touchdown, 2 interceptions
- Jay Cutler – 6/14, 80 yards, 1 interception
- Todd Collins – 0/4, 0 yards

Rushing

- Matt Forte – 17 rushes, 70 yards
- Jay Cutler – 2 rushes, 10 yards
- Caleb Hanie – 1 rush, 3 yards
- Chester Taylor – 3 rushes, 2 yards
- Earl Bennett – 1 rush, -2 yards

Receiving

- Matt Forte – 10 receptions, 90 yards
- Johnny Knox – 2 receptions, 56 yards
- Earl Bennett – 3 receptions, 45 yards, 1 touchdown
- Greg Olsen – 3 receptions, 30 yards
- Chester Taylor – 1 reception, 12 yards

=== Analysis ===
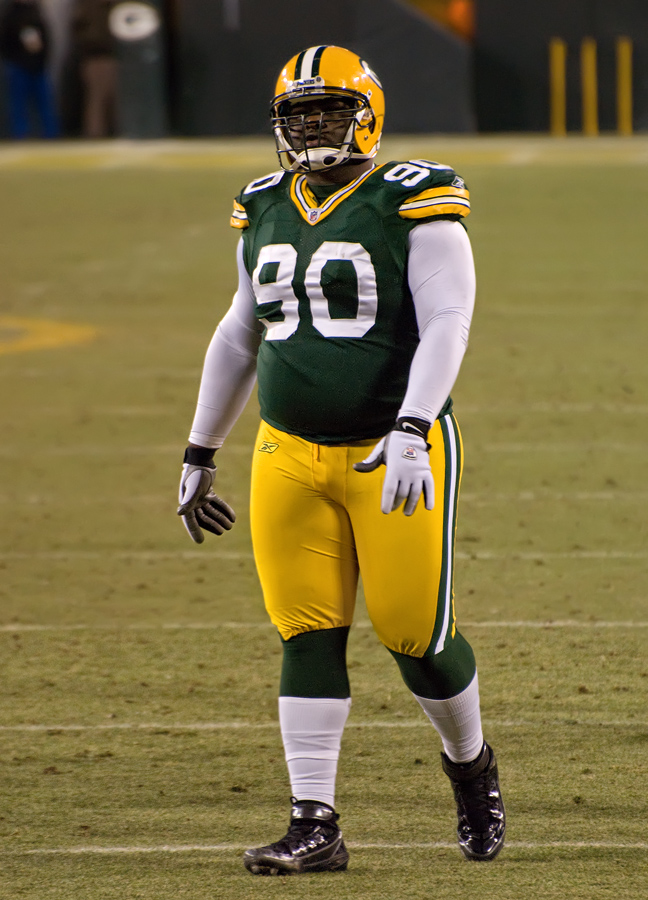
B. J. Raji, pictured here in 2012, had a key interception return for a touchdown in the second half that ended up being the decisive score that secured the Packers' victory.

Post-game analysis centered on the competitive nature of the game, the teams' historic rivalry, and performances by individual players. After the Packers jumped to a 14–0 lead, the game became more defensive. Over the entire game, both teams combined for 17 punts and five interceptions, while each team had only two offensive scoring drives a piece. Each team was also poor on third down, with the Packers and Bears only converting three times combined. For the Bears, Forte carried the offensive load, accumulating 160 yards rushing and receiving combined; his 10 receptions were a franchise playoff record. For the Packers, Jennings had a productive game, catching eight passes for 130 yards. Rodgers threw for 244 yards and rushed for a touchdown, but also threw two interceptions and completed barely 50% of his passes. Shields secured two interceptions, including one on the final drive to seal the victory, while Raji's interception return for a touchdown was highlighted as the key play of the game. Punter Tim Masthay was also highlighted for his success in limiting the productivity of the Bears' star returner, Devin Hester, who would go on to be elected to the Pro Football Hall of Fame. Masthay was able to maximize ball placement, hangtime, and direction to make it difficult for Hester to return the ball, while also providing the Packers' coverage team the opportunity to make a tackle.

Another key point of discussion after the game was the impact of Cutler's injury and the performance of the Bears' back-up quarterbacks. Cutler received much criticism for not continuing to play, even though he had been relatively ineffective. The Bears' coaches were the ones that decided to pull him off the field, and his injury was confirmed after the game. Collins was completely ineffective coming in for two drives, while Hanie was able to come in and move the offense. Even though Hanie threw two interceptions, he ultimately led two scoring drives and gave the Bears an opportunity for a comeback. It was reported that some Bears' players questioned why Hanie was not the second-string quarterback, although his placement on the depth chart may have benefited him, as the Packers admitted after the game they had not done any preparation on Hanie or knew much about him. Multiple sources highlighted the importance of this game to the teams' rivalry, both because it was only the second time they played in the postseason and because the winner moved on to the Super Bowl.

== Outcome ==
With the victory, the Packers advanced to Super Bowl XLV against the Pittsburgh Steelers. It was their first Super Bowl berth since the 1997 NFL season. After the game, Packers defensive back Charles Woodson, referencing president Barack Obama's Chicago roots and the traditional visit to the White House by the NFL champions, predicted a Packers' Super Bowl victory. He stated "The President don't want to come watch the Super Bowl? Guess what? We're gonna see him!" The Packers then went on to beat the Steelers 31–25 to secure the franchise's 13th championship, while also becoming only the second team in NFL history to win a Super Bowl as the sixth seed; the Packers were the first team to do so from the National Football Conference. Rodgers was named the Super Bowl Most Valuable Player after throwing three touchdowns and over 300 yards passing. The Packers would continue their success throughout the 2010s, making the playoffs each of the next six seasons. The 2010 NFC Championship Game marked the pinnacle for the Bears in the 2010s, as they missed the playoffs for the next seven seasons and only made the postseason once more during the decade, in 2018.

=== Legacy ===
Spanning over 100 years, the Bears and Packers have one of the longest and most storied rivalries in NFL history, however the two teams had only ever met in the playoffs once before 2010. In 1941, the Bears beat the Packers 33–14 before winning the 1941 NFL Championship Game against the New York Giants. With a chance to play in the Super Bowl, this NFC Championship Game immediately became a noted part of the teams' rivalry. In 2025, Sports Illustrated identified the game as the best in the history of the rivalry. Raji's interception return for a touchdown, which was the first score of his career, was ranked as one of the 50 greatest sports moments in Wisconsin history by the Milwaukee Journal Sentinel in 2020.

This game, along with the entire playoff run and Super Bowl victory for the Packers, helped solidify Rodgers status as a premier starting quarterback in the NFL. It ended up being the only NFC Championship Game victory for Rodgers, who would go on to lose four straight after 2010. For the Bears, the game has been characterized as one of the worst defeats in team history. Although Cutler returned the next year and had one of his best statistical seasons, questions regarding the severity of his injury during the game and whether he could have played persisted for years.
