= 1941 NFL playoffs =

American football tournament

- Dates: December 14-21, 1941
- Season: 1941
- Teams: 3
- Games played: 2
- NFL Championship Game site: Wrigley Field; Chicago, Illinois
- Defending champions: Chicago Bears
- Champion: Chicago Bears (5th title)
- Runner-up: New York Giants
- Conference runners-up: Green Bay Packers; Brooklyn Dodgers
NFL playoffs
1943 →

The 1941 National Football League (NFL) playoffs occurred after the conclusion of the regular season to determine the champion of the 1941 NFL season. At the conclusion of the regular season, there was a tie for the Western Division championship between the Chicago Bears and Green Bay Packers, requiring an unscheduled one-game playoff, making this the unofficial debut edition of the NFL playoffs. The two teams had finished the regular season with identical 10–1 records and had split their season series. The teams had developed a rivalry; the Bears were defending league champions and the Packers had won the NFL title in 1939.

The Divisional championship game was played on December 14 at Wrigley Field. The winner then hosted the New York Giants (8–3) on December 21 in the NFL Championship Game.

== Regular season ==
The 1941 season was the 22nd regular season of the National Football League (NFL). The league's ten teams were split into two divisions of five teams each: the Eastern and Western Divisions. Each team played a regular season schedule of 11 games, for a total of 55 regular season contests. Prior to the start of the season, the NFL bylaws were changed to provide for playoffs in cases where division races are tied after the regular season and new rules for sudden-death overtimes in case a playoff game was tied after four quarters were added. The Eastern Division was won by the New York Giants with a record of 8–3, beating out the Brooklyn Dodgers and the Washington Redskins. In the Western Division, the Green Bay Packers and Chicago Bears—who were the defending NFL Champions—battled throughout the season for the division lead. The two teams, who had developed a rivalry, played each other twice, splitting the games and giving them each their only loss of the season. Each team finished with a record of 10–1, both coming-from-behind in their last game of the season. The attack on Pearl Harbor occurred the same day the Bears won to tie the Packers' record. With the same record, a playoff game was scheduled to determine who would go to, and host, the 1941 NFL Championship Game.

=== Final standings ===
NFL Eastern Division
	W	L	T	PCT	DIV	PF	PA	STK
New York Giants	8	3	0	.727	6–2	238	114	L1
Brooklyn Dodgers	7	4	0	.636	6–2	158	127	W2
Washington Redskins	6	5	0	.545	5–3	176	174	W1
Philadelphia Eagles	2	8	1	.200	1–6–1	119	218	L3
Pittsburgh Steelers	1	9	1	.100	1–6–1	103	276	L2

Note: Tie games were not officially counted in the standings until 1972.

NFL Western Division
	W	L	T	PCT	DIV	PF	PA	STK
Chicago Bears	10	1	0	.909	7–1	396	147	W5
Green Bay Packers	10	1	0	.909	7–1	258	120	W8
Detroit Lions	4	6	1	.400	3–4–1	121	195	W1
Chicago Cardinals	3	7	1	.300	1–6–1	127	197	L2
Cleveland Rams	2	9	0	.182	1–7	116	244	L9

Note: Tie games were not officially counted in the standings until 1972.

== Postseason ==
=== Tournament bracket ===
Western Division playoff			NFL Championship
			E	New York	9
W	Green Bay	14	W	Chicago Bears	37
W	Chicago Bears	33

=== Western Division championship ===
Chicago Bears 33, Green Bay Packers 14

Quarter	1	2	3	4	Total
Packers	7	0	7	0	14
Bears	6	24	0	3	33

at Wrigley Field in Chicago, Illinois

- Date: December 14, 1941
- Game weather: 16 °F (−9 °C)
- Game attendance: 43,425
- Source: Pro-Football-Reference.com

Game information

- First quarter
  - GB – Clarke Hinkle, 1-yard run (Don Hutson kick). Packers 7–0.
  - CHI – Hugh Gallarneau, 81-yard punt return (kick blocked). Packers 7–6.
- Second quarter
  - CHI – Bob Snyder 24-yard field goal. Bears 9–7.
  - CHI – Norm Standlee, 3-yard run (Joe Stydahar kick). Bears 16–7.
  - CHI – Norm Standlee, 2-yard run (Joe Stydahar kick). Bears 23–7.
  - CHI – Swisher, 9-yard run (Joe Stydahar kick). Bears 30–7.
- Third quarter
  - GB – Hal Van Every, 10-yard pass from Cecil Isbell (Don Hutson kick). Bears 30–14.
- Fourth quarter
  - CHI – Bob Snyder 26-yard field goal. Bears 33–14.

Top passers

- GB – Cecil Isbell – 8/19, 107 yards, 1 TD
- CHI – Sid Luckman – 4/9, 41 yards

Top rushers

- GB – Clarke Hinkle – 9 rushes, 17 yards, 1 TD
- CHI – George McAfee – 14 rushes, 119 yards

Top receivers

- GB – Ed Frutig – 3 receptions, 75 yards
- CHI – George McAfee – 2 receptions, 27 yards

This game marked the first postseason meeting in the Bears–Packers rivalry, with the second meeting not occurring for another 70 years, in the 2010 NFC Championship Game. The game began evenly, but a 24-point second quarter by the Bears created a insurmountable lead, with the Bears ultimately winning 33–14 to move on to the NFL Championship Game.

=== NFL Championship game ===
Chicago Bears 37, New York Giants 9

Quarter	1	2	3	4	Total
Giants	6	0	3	0	9
Bears	3	6	14	14	37

at Wrigley Field in Chicago, Illinois

- Date: December 21, 1941
- Pro-Football-Reference

Game information

- First quarter
  - CHI – Bob Snyder 14-yard field goal. Bears 3–0
  - NYG – George Franck 31-yard pass from Tuffy Leemans (kick failed). Giants 6–3
- Second quarter
  - CHI – Bob Snyder 39-yard field goal. Tied 6–6
  - CHI – Bob Snyder 37-yard field goal. Bears 9–6
- Third quarter
  - NYG – Ward Cuff 16-yard field goal. Tied 9–9
  - CHI – Norm Standlee 2-yard run (Snyder kick). Bears 16–9
  - CHI – Norm Standlee 7-yard run (Joe Maniaci kick). Bears 23–9
- Fourth quarter
  - CHI – George McAfee 5-yard run (Lee Artoe kick). Bears 30–9
  - CHI – Ken Kavanaugh 42-yard fumble return (Ray McLean kick). Bears 37–9

Top passers

- NYG – Tuffy Leemans – 3/9, 73 yards, 1 TD, 3 INT
- CHI – Sid Luckman – 9/12, 160 yards

Top rushers

- NYG – Tuffy Leemans – 9 rushes, 52 yards
- CHI – Norm Standlee – 17 rushes, 89 yards, 2 TD

Top receivers

- NYG – Ward Cuff – 2 receptions, 42 yards
- CHI – Dick Plasman – 2 receptions, 48 yards
