= Instant Replay Game =

Notable American football game

Chicago Bears (5–4)	Green Bay Packers (5–4)
13	14
Head coach: Mike Ditka	Head coach: Lindy Infante
	1	2	3	4	Total
CHI	3	0	10	0	13
GB	7	0	0	7	14
- Date: November 5, 1989
- Stadium: Lambeau Field; Green Bay, Wisconsin, U.S.
- Favorite: Bears by 3 pts
- Referee: Tom Dooley
- Attendance: 56,556

TV in the United States
- Network: CBS
- Announcers: Dick Stockton and Dan Fouts

The Instant Replay Game, also known as the Asterisk Game, was a National Football League (NFL) game between the Green Bay Packers and Chicago Bears on November 5, 1989, at Lambeau Field, in Green Bay, Wisconsin, United States. The Packers defeated the visiting Bears 14–13 on a controversial fourth-down touchdown pass from Don Majkowski to Sterling Sharpe with less than a minute to play in the game. Line judge Jim Quirk initially called a penalty on the play for an illegal forward pass, thus nullifying the potentially game-winning score. Quirk's penalty was based on the belief that Majkowski had thrown the pass after the ball had passed the line of scrimmage.

The use of instant replay in the NFL had been adopted three years prior in 1986; this allowed referees to review certain calls on the field to either confirm or overturn the initial ruling. After a long replay review, the instant replay official overturned the call on the field and awarded the touchdown to the Packers. It was determined that the ball was behind the line of scrimmage when it was released, which based on the rules of the NFL at the time made the pass legal. The successful extra point put the Packers up 14–13, which would eventually be the winning score. The game was notable for its dramatic finish, the controversial use of instant replay, and it being the first Packers victory over the Bears since 1984.

== Background ==
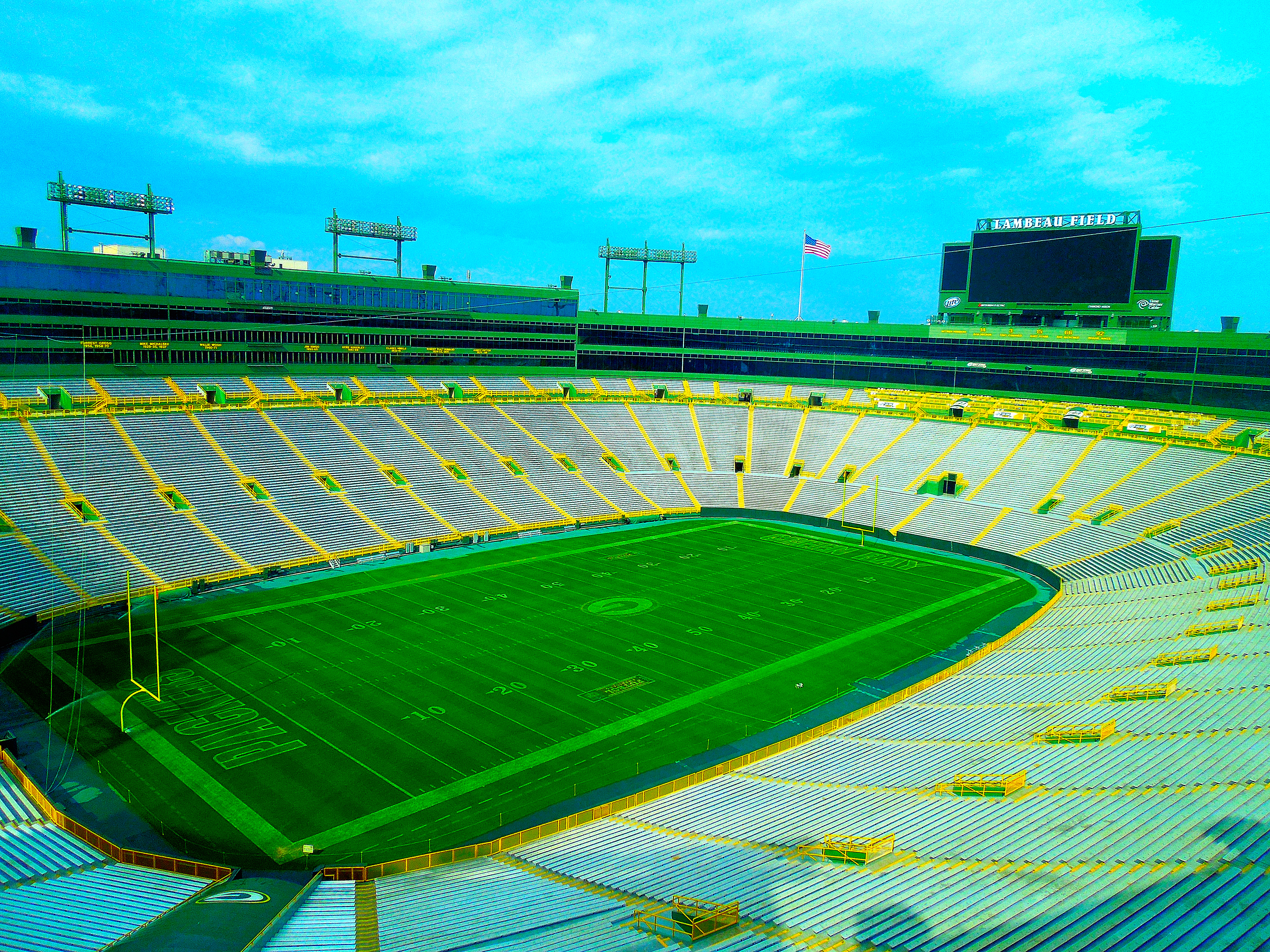
Lambeau Field, pictured here in 2012, was the site of the Instant Replay Game.

The Bears–Packers rivalry is the most played rivalry in NFL history, with over 200 games played since 1921. Each team has had periods of sustained success over the other, but the late 1980s saw the Bears win eight straight games against the Packers from 1985 to 1988. During these four seasons, the Bears went to the playoffs each year, including winning the Super Bowl during the 1985 NFL season. The Packers on the other hand had only been to the playoffs twice since 1967, with the last time being the strike-shortened 1982 NFL season.

Because the Bears and Packers are in the same division, they are scheduled to play each other twice a season: once in Green Bay and once in Chicago. In 1989, their first match-up was scheduled for November 6 in Green Bay and the second was scheduled for December 17 in Chicago. Chicago started off their 1989 season strong, winning their first four games of the season. They then proceeded to lose their next three games before beating the Los Angeles Rams the week before the match-up against the Packers. They entered Week 9 with a record of 5–3. The Packers started their season with a record of 3–4, before beating the Detroit Lions in overtime to even their record before their match-up with the Bears.

== Game summary ==
The Packers took the lead in the first quarter with a 24-yard touchdown pass from Don Majkowski to tight end Clint Didier. The Bears quickly responded with a 25-yard field goal by kicker Kevin Butler. Neither team scored in the second quarter, leaving the score as 7–3 with the Packers in the lead going into halftime. In the third quarter, Butler kicked a 37-yard field goal to bring the Bears to within one point, down 7–6. The Bears finally scored their first touchdown later in the quarter with a two-yard run by fullback Brad Muster, putting them in the lead 13–7 going into the fourth quarter. The fourth quarter saw the Bears and Packers go back and forth, with neither team scoring. Two Packers drives in the fourth quarter ended in turnovers.

"After further review, we have a reversal. Touchdown."

— Referee Tom Dooley announcing the reversal of the penalty to the Lambeau Field crowd

The Packers got the ball on their own 27-yard line with a little under five minutes left in the game. They drove down the field to the seven-yard line with a minute and a half left to play. On first down, Majkowski was sacked and fumbled the ball, but the Packers recovered. Now on the 14-yard line, Majkowski threw two incompletions, bringing up fourth down and goal with 41 seconds left on the game clock. Majkowski received the snap and scrambled to his right, improvizing from the original play call due to a Bears' blitz. As he approached the line of scrimmage, he threw the ball to Sterling Sharpe in the end zone for an apparent touchdown. However, line judge Jim Quirk threw a penalty flag for an illegal forward pass, thus negating the touchdown and giving the Bears possession after a turnover on downs. As the Bears celebrated, the replay official notified referee Tom Dooley that he was going to review the play to determine if the penalty was correct. After over four minutes elapsed, Dooley indicated to the crowd that the penalty was overturned and the Packers touchdown would stand. Chris Jacke kicked the extra point to put the Packers up by 14–13. With only 32 seconds left, the Bears attempted a few desperation plays after the kick-off but were unsuccessful, with the Packers holding on for a 14–13 victory.

=== Box score ===
"Instant Replay Game" – Game summary

Quarter	1	2	3	4	Total
Bears	3	0	10	0	13
Packers	7	0	0	7	14

at Lambeau Field, Green Bay, Wisconsin

- Date: Sunday, November 5, 1989
- Game time: 1:00 p.m. CST
- Game weather: temperature: 47 °F (8 °C); relative humidity: 77%; wind: 14 miles per hour (23 km/h)
- Game attendance: 56,556
- Referee: Tom Dooley
- Sources:Pro-Football-Reference.com and Wisconsin State Journal

Game information

First quarter

- GNB Clint Didier 24-yard pass from Don Majkowski (Chris Jacke extra point), 11:30. Packers 7–0. Drive: 6 plays, 72 yards, 3:30.
- CHI Kevin Butler 25-yard FG, 3:32. Packers 7–3. Drive: 13 plays, 60 yards, 7:58.

Second Quarter

- No scoring

Third Quarter

- CHI Kevin Butler 37-yard FG, 9:32. Packers 7–6. Drive: 5 plays, 15 yards, 0:56.
- CHI Brad Muster 2-yard run (Kevin Butler kick), 3:03. Bears 13–7. Drive: 8 plays, 80 yards, 5:17.

Fourth quarter

- GNB Sterling Sharpe 14-yard pass from Don Majkowski (Chris Jacke extra point), 0:32. Packers 14–13. Drive: 14 plays, 73 yards, 4:12.

Top passers

- GNB – Don Majkowski – 23/40, 299 YDS, 2 TDS, 1 INT
- CHI – Jim Harbaugh – 16/30 203 YDS

Top rushers

- GNB – Brent Fullwood – 10 CAR, 38 YDS
- CHI – Neal Anderson – 15 CAR, 58 YDS

Top receivers

- GNB – Brent Fullwood 2 REC, 76 YDS
- CHI – Brad Muster – 6 REC, 68 YDS

== Outcome ==
For the Packers, the win was significant. It was their first victory over their biggest rivals since 1984 and gave them a winning record of 5–4. The game's dramatic finish and other several close wins contributed to a new nickname for the 1989 team: "The Cardiac Pack". Don Majkowski would later note the importance of the game on his career, stating "that's probably my defining moment as a Green Bay Packers, my most famous play." The victory also contributed to quarterback Majkowski's nickname, the "Majik Man", for his proclivity for dramatic and sometimes improbable finishes. This victory over the Bears was one of a then-record four one-point victories for the 1989 Packers. The Packers would finish with a record of 10–6, with the 10 wins being the most of any Packers team since 1972. One of those wins was a Week 15 victory over the Bears in Soldier Field, giving the Packers the season's sweep. The Packers would go on to just miss the playoffs due to a tie-breaker with the Minnesota Vikings. The Bears responded well the next week, shutting out the Steelers 20–0. However, they then ended the season on a six-game losing streak and finished with a record of 6–10. The Bears missed the playoffs for the first time since 1983.

=== Legacy ===
Instant replay in the NFL was still relatively new; it had only been first implemented in 1986. The way that instant replay was applied at the end of the game was controversial. Quirk, the official that threw the flag for illegal forward pass, was positioned on the line of scrimmage on the other side of the field, but arguably had the best view of the play. At the time, the rule for an illegal forward pass dictated that the ball had to cross the line of scrimmage before it was thrown to be a penalty, regardless of the location of the person throwing the ball. Quirk judged from his position that the ball had passed the line of scrimmage before Majkowski had thrown the ball. When the play went to replay review, replay official Bill Parkinson only had a few camera angles available to review. The best view was from approximately the 20-yard line, but even that one was fuzzy and unclear. Art McNally, the NFL's director of officials, made no official statement on the play or the replay process after the game. However, according to Quirk, McNally noted on multiple occasions in private that Parkinson lacked the indisputable visual evidence required to overturn the call on the field. The NFL abandoned the instant replay process in 1991 until a new system was put in place in 1999. The rule for an illegal forward pass was also changed to make it easier to make a determination, now stating that the player throwing the ball had to be fully past the line of scrimmage for the pass to be considered illegal.

The Bears did not agree with the call, with many players and coaches commenting on it for years to come, and others never acknowledging the loss. For 10 years, the Bears media guide put an asterisk next to the result of the game, noting their belief the call was incorrect. This gave the game its other name: the Asterisk Game. When asked about the game in 2014, the Bears head coach during the game, Mike Ditka, noted his belief that the call went the way it did because the game was in Green Bay, and that it would have gone the other way if the game had been played in Chicago. However, that same year, Bears middle linebacker Mike Singletary noted his acceptance of the result of the game, saying "In all honesty, they deserved to win the game. The fact that the call was overturned in the end I thought it was fitting." In 2020, the game was identified by the Milwaukee Journal Sentinel as one of the greatest moments in Wisconsin sports history.

== See also ==
- List of nicknamed NFL games and plays
- 2018 NFC Championship Game – playoff game with a controversial call in the 4th quarter that led to NFL rule changes
