= Chester Marcol =

Polish player of American football (born 1949)

No. 13, 5
- Position: Placekicker

Personal information
- Born: October 24, 1949 (age 77); Opole, Poland
- Listed height: 6 ft 0 in (1.83 m)
- Listed weight: 190 lb (86 kg)

Career information
- High school: Imlay City (Imlay City, Michigan)
- College: Hillsdale
- NFL draft: 1972: 2nd round, 34th overall pick

Career history
- Green Bay Packers (1972–1980); Houston Oilers (1980)

Awards and highlights
- 1972 NFC Rookie of the Year; 2× First-team All-Pro (1972, 1974); 2× Pro Bowl (1972, 1974); 2× NFL scoring leader (1972, 1974); Green Bay Packers Hall of Fame; NFL records: Field goal attempts (rookie season) – 48 (1972); Packers: Field goals made (season) – 33 (1972) (Note: Co-leader with Mason Crosby (2013) and Ryan Longwell (2000))

Career NFL statistics
- FGM / FGA: 121 / 196
- FG%: 61.7%
- XPM / XPA: 156 / 167
- Total touchdowns: 1
- Stats at Pro Football Reference

Czesław Bolesław "Chester" Marcol (born October 24, 1949) is a Polish American former professional football player who was a placekicker in the National Football League (NFL), primarily for the Green Bay Packers from 1972 to 1980. He played college football for the Hillsdale Chargers. He was inducted into the Green Bay Packers Hall of Fame in 1987.

== Early life ==
Marcol lived in Poland until the age of 14, when his father committed suicide, forcing Marcol's mother to send their family to the United States. Marcol soon became a U.S. citizen. He attended Imlay City High School in Michigan without much knowledge of the English language. In Poland, Marcol had great kicking abilities in soccer. His gym teacher discovered his talent and showed him the game of football. He attended Hillsdale College where he was named NAIA All-American and holds the record for longest field goal.

== Professional career ==
Marcol was selected by Packers head coach Dan Devine in the second round (34th overall) of the 1972 NFL draft. He scored 128 points his rookie year, leading the league in scoring, and he was named NFC Rookie of the Year — the only kicker to have received that honor — and an All-Pro. He again led the league in scoring and was named an All-Pro and Pro Bowler in 1974.

Marcol may best be known for his game-winning touchdown in the 1980 season opener, at home against the Chicago Bears. The Packers were tied 6–6 with the Bears after regulation; in overtime, a 32-yard pass from Lynn Dickey to James Lofton helped set up a 34-yard field goal attempt to win the game. Marcol's kick was blocked by veteran Alan Page (the ball hit Page's helmet) and deflected straight back to Marcol; he caught the ball, ran around left end, and was able to make it 25 yards into the end zone for a 12–6 Packers victory. He later acknowledged that he was high on cocaine during the game's second half.

A month later, Marcol was cut by head coach Bart Starr on October 8, following a rough game against the Cincinnati Bengals, a 14–9 home win for Green Bay. Starr said Marcol was cut because of poor kickoffs, but Marcol felt it was because of his cocaine use; he was succeeded by Tom Birney, then hall of famer Jan Stenerud. Marcol signed with the Houston Oilers two months later when they came to Green Bay for a game on December 14. It was determined very late that week that Oilers kicker Toni Fritsch would be unable to play and Marcol was still residing in Green Bay, so the Oilers claimed him off waivers. He kicked one field goal (27 yd), but made only one of three PATs in a 22–3 Houston win. Marcol remained with the Oilers for the rest of the season, but did not play again due to Fritsch's return. Marcol has said that his excessive drug and alcohol use shortened his career drastically and that he could've played well into his forties, claiming that he was still making 50-yard field goals in his street clothes at that age. He was inducted into the Green Bay Packers Hall of Fame in 1987.

== Post-football years ==
On 14 February 1986, Marcol attempted suicide by drinking a mixture of battery acid, rat poison, and vodka, which severely damaged his esophagus. He had his esophagus stretched as treatment.

Marcol is a resident of the Upper Peninsula community of Dollar Bay, Michigan. He has a wife and five children. He slowly recovered from his addictions, but still suffers from hepatitis C and a heart condition. He works on weekends as a drug and alcohol abuse counselor near his home. A lot of his clients think that he has been an immense help to their recovery, and a big support system for helping stay sober.

Marcol published a memoir in September 2011 entitled Alive and Kicking: My Journey Through Football, Addiction and Life. He discusses his childhood, immigration to the United States, playing for the Packers, and his fall from grace.
