= B. J. Raji =

American football player (born 1986)

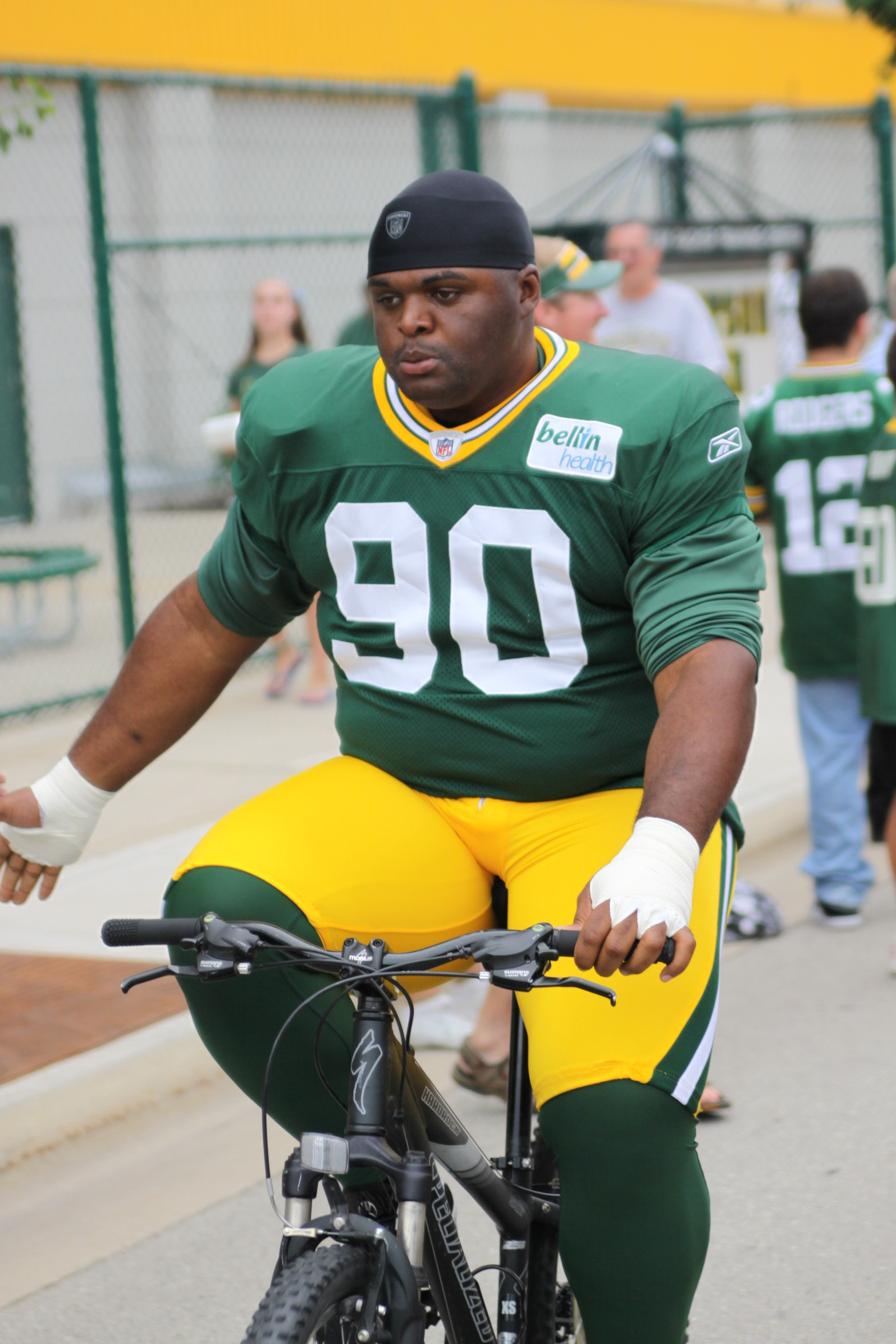
- Raji with the Green Bay Packers in 2011

No. 90
- Position: Defensive tackle

Personal information
- Born: July 11, 1986 (age 40); New York, New York, U.S.
- Listed height: 6 ft 2 in (1.88 m)
- Listed weight: 337 lb (153 kg)

Career information
- High school: Westwood Regional (Westwood, New Jersey)
- College: Boston College (2004–2008)
- NFL draft: 2009: 1st round, 9th overall pick

Career history
- Green Bay Packers (2009–2015)

Awards and highlights
- Super Bowl champion (XLV); Pro Bowl (2011); PFWA All-Rookie Team (2009); Third-team All-American (2008); First-team All-ACC (2008); Second-team All-ACC (2006)

Career NFL statistics
- Total tackles: 165
- Sacks: 12
- Fumble recoveries: 1
- Pass deflections: 12
- Interceptions: 1
- Rushing touchdowns: 1
- Stats at Pro Football Reference

Busari Alamu Raji Jr. (born July 11, 1986) is an American former professional football player who was a defensive tackle for the Green Bay Packers of the National Football League (NFL). He played college football for the Boston College Eagles. Raji was selected by the Green Bay Packers with the ninth overall pick in the 2009 NFL draft. He won Super Bowl XLV with the Packers against the Pittsburgh Steelers.

== Early life ==
Raji was born in New York City on July 11, 1986, the son to Busari Raji, Sr. and Mamie Raji. A three-year starter on both the offensive and defensive lines at Westwood Regional High School, he earned All-State, All-Conference, and All-County honors as a senior. Raji was also a two-time All-Bergen County Scholastic League choice. In 2003, he recorded 75 tackles, 7.5 sacks, and four forced fumbles. He was selected to play in the 2004 Governor's Bowl, a game played between the top high-school seniors in New Jersey and New York.

Considered a two-star recruit by Rivals.com, Raji was not ranked among the top defensive tackle prospects of the Class of 2004, which also included DeMario Pressley, Frank Okam, and Glenn Dorsey. Raji chose to attend Boston College over Rutgers and Wisconsin.

== College career ==
Raji made the Boston College Eagles as a true freshman in 2004, playing in a rotation behind senior Tim Bulman. He made his college debut in the home opener against Penn State, making one tackle. He finished the year with 13 tackles (6 solos) and 1.5 tackles for loss.

As a sophomore, Raji started in all twelve games, registering 27 tackles (20 solos), 6.5 tackles for loss, 1.5 sacks, and one pass breakup. He recorded one unassisted tackle against Boise State in the MPC Computers Bowl.

In his 2006 junior season, Raji started in 12 games, finishing with 63 career tackles (37 solos), 16.5 tackles for loss, 3.5 sacks, and four pass breakups. He also had three solo stops, including two tackles for loss in the Meineke Car Care Bowl against Navy.

Raji missed the 2007 season due to academic reasons. Returning to the team in 2008, he started on a defense that included Ron Brace, Kevin Akins, Mark Herzlich, Robert Francois, and Brian Toal, anchoring the defense to a berth in the 2008 Music City Bowl. Over his four-year college career, Raji amassed 99 tackles (23 for a loss) and 9 sacks, and was named all-ACC twice, in 2006 as a 2nd-team member and in 2008 as a first-team starter.

== Professional career ==
Pre-draft measurables
Height	Weight	Arm length	Hand span	40-yard dash	10-yard split	20-yard split	20-yard shuttle	Three-cone drill	Vertical jump	Broad jump	Bench press
6 ft 1 1/2 in (1.87 m)	337 lb (153 kg)	32 in (0.81 m)	10 3/8 in (0.26 m)	5.23 s	1.82 s	3.02 s	4.69 s	7.90 s	32 in (0.81 m)	8 ft 7 in (2.62 m)	33 reps
All values from NFL Combine

Raji was selected in the first round with the ninth overall pick by the Green Bay Packers in the 2009 NFL draft. He was worked into defensive coordinator Dom Capers' brand new 3–4 scheme during the start of the Packers 2009 season. Raji held out during the 2009 training camp and completed his deal on August 14. Hampered by an ankle injury for the entire season, he appeared in fourteen games (once as a starter), and managed 25 tackles and 1 sack.

Fully recovered and expected to fully contribute for the 2010 season, Raji earned the starting position at the sole defensive tackle position in Capers' 3–4 type defense, switching previous starter Ryan Pickett to defensive end. 2010 was a breakout season, as he started in all 16 games. Raji became the defensive anchor that the Packers had envisioned, accumulating 39 tackles with 6.5 sacks, along with 3 passes defended.

The Packers began using Raji as an additional fullback in their goal line offense during the 2011 postseason, which led to Raji nicknaming himself "the Freezer" in homage to William Perry, who played for the Bears and was nicknamed "the Fridge". On January 23, 2011, in the fourth quarter of the 2010 NFC Championship Game at Soldier Field in Chicago, Raji intercepted a pass from Bears backup quarterback Caleb Hanie and returned it 18 yards to the end zone, marking Raji's first career interception and touchdown. The 337-pound Raji performed a memorable hula dance after the touchdown, an incident that was parodied in a State Farm Insurance commercial featuring Raji and Aaron Rodgers. The play also broke William Perry's NFL record for the heaviest player to score a post-season touchdown. The touchdown proved to be the decisive score, and with that interception, the Packers advanced to Super Bowl XLV, where they defeated the Pittsburgh Steelers by a score of 31–25. He was ranked 81st by his fellow players on the NFL Top 100 Players of 2011.

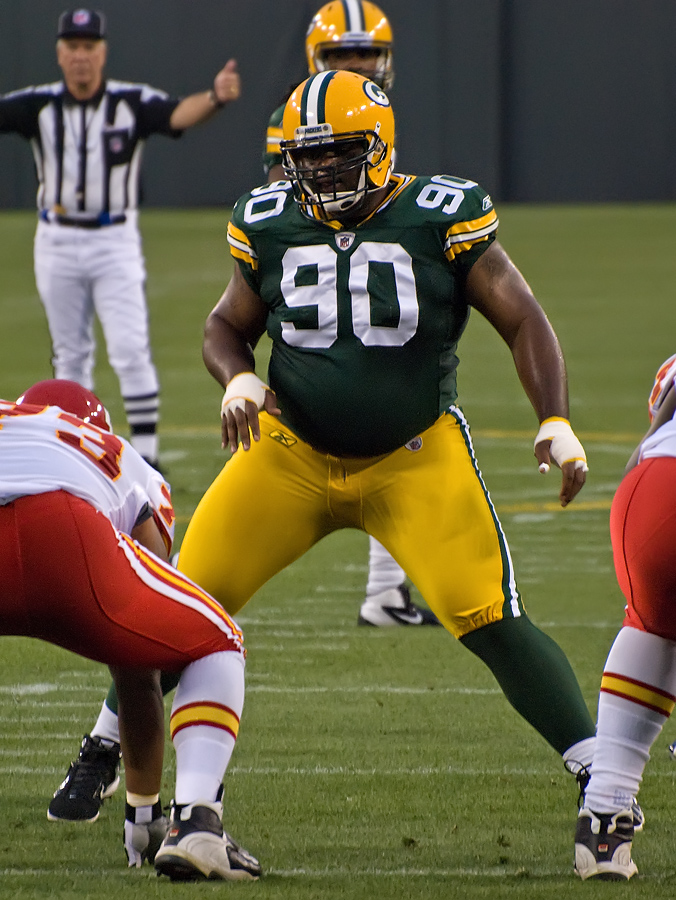
Raji against the Kansas City Chiefs in 2011

In early August 2011, Raji was named the co-host of the "In The Huddle" radio show along with longtime Wisconsin sports reporter Bill Scott. The one-hour show airs live from Tanner's Sports Bar in Kimberly near Green Bay.

During a Week 11 matchup against the Tampa Bay Buccaneers on November 20, on his first and only carry of his career, Raji scored a rushing touchdown in the 35–26 victory. He was only the fourth defensive lineman to score a rushing touchdown since the NFL/AFL merger. On December 28, 2011, he was elected to his first Pro Bowl appearance. In 16 games of the 2011 season, Raji registered 3 sacks and 2 passes defended on 24 tackles. The Packers finished the season with an NFL-best 15–1 record for an NFC North pennant, but lost to the New York Giants 37–20 in the divisional round.

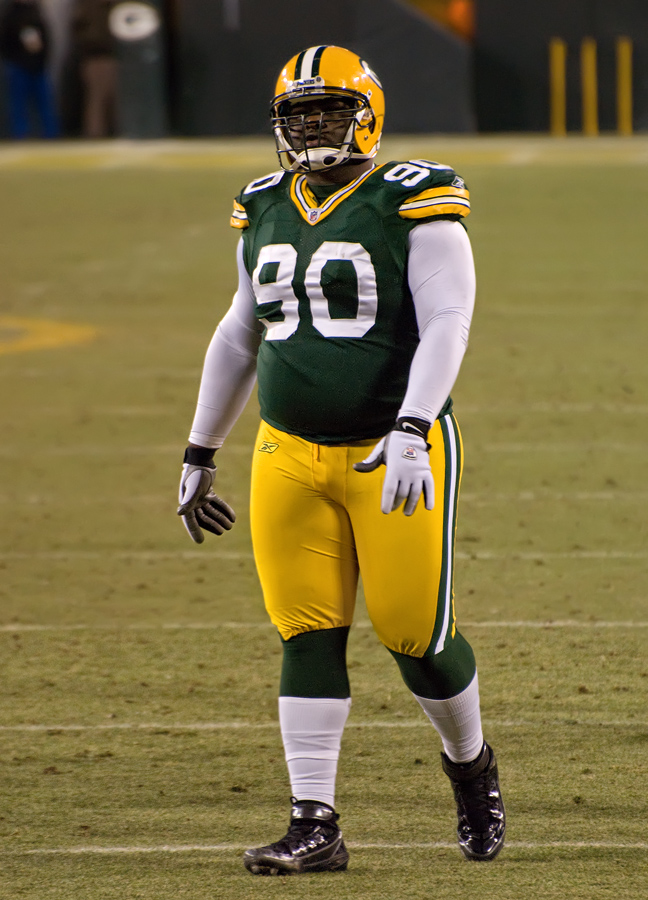
Raji against the New York Giants in January 2012

Raji played in 14 games in the 2012 season, making 26 tackles and defended two passes.

The Packers' defensive line became short-handed in 2013 due to injuries. Raji was transitioned to defensive end, while Ryan Pickett maintained the role at defensive tackle. He started all 16 games at defensive end, making 17 tackles.

On August 22, 2014, in a preseason game against the Oakland Raiders, Raji suffered a torn right biceps. He was subsequently placed on injured reserve, and missed the entire 2014 NFL season.

On March 30, 2015, Raji signed a one-year, $3.5 million deal with the Packers. In the 2015 season, Raji totaled 22 tackles and half a sack.

=== Retirement and possible return ===
On March 14, 2016, Raji announced his retirement from professional football after seven seasons, but noted he planned on returning to the league and that he was simply taking a "hiatus". However, as of 2026, he has remained retired.

=== Statistics ===
Source: NFL.com

Year	Team	G	GS	Tackles					Interceptions						Fumbles	
Year	Team	G	GS	Total	Solo	Ast	Sck	SFTY	PDef	Int	Yds	Avg	Lng	TDs	FF	FR
Regular season
2009	GB	14	1	25	19	6	1.0	0	1	0	0	0.0	0	0	0	0
2010	GB	16	16	39	29	10	6.5	0	3	0	0	0.0	0	0	0	0
2011	GB	16	16	22	14	8	3.0	0	2	0	0	0.0	0	0	0	1
2012	GB	14	14	26	16	10	0.0	0	2	0	0	0.0	0	0	0	0
2013	GB	16	16	17	12	5	0.0	0	0	0	0	0.0	0	0	0	0
2015	GB	15	15	22	13	9	0.5	0	2	0	0	0.0	0	0	0	0
Total		91	78	151	103	48	11.0	0	10	0	0	0.0	0	0	0	1
Postseason
2009	GB	1	0	1	0	1	0.0	0	0	0	0	0.0	0	0	0	0
2010	GB	4	4	5	5	0	1.0	0	2	1	18	18.0	18	1	0	0
2011	GB	1	1	2	0	2	0.0	0	0	0	0	0.0	0	0	0	0
2012	GB	2	2	0	0	0	0.0	0	0	0	0	0.0	0	0	0	0
2013	GB	1	1	2	1	1	0.0	0	0	0	0	0.0	0	0	0	0
2015	GB	2	2	4	4	0	0.0	0	0	0	0	0.0	0	0	0	0
Total		11	10	14	10	4	1.0	0	2	1	18	18.0	18	1	0	0
