= Jim Quirk =

American football official (born 1940)

- Born: c. 1945
- Education: Long Branch High School; University Delaware; George Washington University
- Occupation: NFL official (1988–2008)
- Spouse: Carol Christopher
- Children: Three

Jim Quirk Sr. (born c. 1945) is an American football official in the National Football League (NFL) from the 1988 NFL season to the 2008 NFL season. Quirk, who wore uniform number 5, was notable for his hustle between plays on the football field, resulting in the length of games being shortened. He is known for being involved in a game that later became known as the "Instant Replay Game".

== Personal ==
Quirk attended high school at Long Branch High School in Long Branch, New Jersey, where he played football, and later graduated from in 1963. Following high school, he served two years at Fort Monroe in Virginia as a First Lieutenant in the Continental Army Command Headquarters Honor Guard Company. He was a guard and linebacker at the University of Delaware and later earned a master's degree in personnel administration from George Washington University.

Quirk began a career in government securities on New York City's Wall Street in 1965. For thirty-two years, he traveled all over the world, trading with foreign banks. While working in New York City, his interest began in football officiating.

A resident of Rumson, New Jersey, Quirk is married to Carol Christopher, his high school sweetheart; they have three children.

== Officiating career ==
=== Early years ===
Quirk began his football officiating career working high school games, and as an off-field official at Giants Stadium. During New York Giants football games, he served on the chain crew and later was the stadium's game clock operator. Progressing to the college level in 1977, he officiated in the Eastern College Athletic Conference as an umpire until 1988.

=== NFL career ===
Quirk was hired by the NFL in 1988 as a line judge and he later moved to the umpire position. Since coming into the league, he was assigned to Super Bowl XXXII, and he was an alternate in Super Bowl XXXVIII.

==== The Instant Replay Game ====
In Quirk's second year in the NFL, he was involved in an instant replay decision during a 1989 NFL season game between the Chicago Bears and Green Bay Packers. It would become known in NFL lore as "The Instant Replay Game". On fourth down, Green Bay quarterback Don Majkowski threw an apparent fourteen-yard touchdown pass to wide receiver Sterling Sharpe with thirty-two seconds remaining in the fourth quarter to tie the score of the game at 13-13. As a line judge, Quirk ruled that Majkowski's body had crossed the line of scrimmage, which under rules was an illegal forward pass, nullifying the touchdown and turning over the ball to Chicago. The play was reviewed by the replay official, Bill Parkinson. Parkinson relied on the view supplied by a fixed camera on the roof of the stadium to review the play. After a four minutes and 54 seconds, he ruled the ball was still behind the line, overruling Quirk's call, and giving the Packers the score. Green Bay kicked the extra point and won the game, 14–13.

The impact of this play resulted in the change of the illegal forward pass rule for the 1990 NFL season to include a passer's body being across the line, not only the ball, in determining an infraction and a limit of two minutes for instant replay reviews. The following year, the Bears, still upset over the replay reversal, noted the game with an asterisk in the team's media guide as a "Replay ruling". It has been said this call was one of the factors that led to the resignation of Art McNally, who at the time was the league's supervisor of officials.

==== Altercations with players ====
As an umpire, Quirk often is responsible for breaking up scuffles among players. During a 1999 NFL season game between the Chicago Bears and St. Louis Rams, Quirk attempted to break up a skirmish between the Rams Jeff Robinson and the Bears Ty Hallock. Quirk grabbed Robinson by the waist and tackled him to the ground. Robinson was ejected by Quirk for throwing a punch at Hallock. As the game was concluding, Robinson asked Quirk if he could have a photo taken together. Robinson later had the photo enlarged and hung it on the wall of his den. After the game, Todd Lyght commented on Quirk's tackle saying, "He did that with authority, and that was an older guy, too. That wasn't one of the young umps. He put it on him. I think that might open up (ESPN's) Prime Time." Dick Vermeil, then-coach of the Rams, later joked with Robinson, asking him, "(Quirk is a) Hell of a tackler, isn't he?"

In another memorable game between the Chicago Bears and Green Bay Packers, this time during the 2007 NFL season, Quirk grabbed Packers linebacker Nick Barnett around the neck and pulled him to the ground during a scuffle between the two teams. Following the game, Quirk was told by league officials privately that he went "over the line" in restraining Barnett, but he would not face disciplinary action. Mike Pereira, the league's director of officiating, said, "[Quirk] should refrain from similar techniques when trying to break up a potential skirmish." At the time of the incident, Barnett's agent withheld from filing a formal grievance with the league in exchange for a public apology by the league that Quirk's actions were wrong. Joking about the incident, Barnett said, "I got in a choke hold, I couldn't really breathe a little bit. [Quirk] got a good one on me. I don't know how he got under that face mask, but he got a good hold on me." On December 28, 2007, the NFL announced that Quirk was fined an entire game check, US$8,150, for his actions against Barnett and for an earlier altercation on December 16, 2007, with Atlanta Falcons fullback Jason Snelling on a kickoff return.
