= 1940 Big Ten Conference football season =

- Sport: Football
- Teams: 9
- Top draft pick: Tom Harmon
- Champion: Minnesota
- Season MVP: Tom Harmon

Football seasons

1940 Big Ten Conference football standings
	Conf.					Overall
Team	W		L		T	W		L		T
No. 1 Minnesota $	6	–	0	–	0	8	–	0	–	0
No. 3 Michigan	3	–	1	–	0	7	–	1	–	0
No. 8 Northwestern	4	–	2	–	0	6	–	2	–	0
Ohio State	3	–	3	–	0	4	–	4	–	0
Wisconsin	3	–	3	–	0	4	–	4	–	0
Iowa	2	–	3	–	0	4	–	4	–	0
Indiana	2	–	3	–	0	3	–	5	–	0
Purdue	1	–	4	–	0	2	–	6	–	0
Illinois	0	–	5	–	0	1	–	7	–	0
$ – Conference champion; Rankings from AP Poll

The 1940 Big Ten Conference football season was the 45th season of college football played by the member schools of the Big Ten Conference (also known as the Western Conference) and was a part of the 1940 college football season. The University of Chicago terminated its football program after the 1939 season, leaving only nine conference members fielding football teams. However, Chicago remained a member of the conference and participated in other sports, and the conference remained known generally as the Big Ten.

The 1940 Minnesota Golden Gophers football team under head coach Bernie Bierman compiled a perfect 8–0 record, outscored opponents by a combined total of 154 to 71, won the Big Ten championship, and was ranked No. 1 in the final AP Poll. Quarterback Bob Paffrath was selected as the team's most valuable player. Tackle Urban Odson and halfback George Franck were consensus first-team picks for the 1940 College Football All-America Team.

Michigan, under head coach Fritz Crisler, compiled a 7–1 record, led the conference in both scoring offense (24.5 points per game) and scoring defense (4.3 points per game), and finished the season ranked No. 3 in the final AP Poll. The team's sole setback was a 7–6 loss on the road against Minnesota. Halfback Tom Harmon was a unanimous first-team All-American and the winner of the Heisman Trophy, the Maxwell Award, the Chicago Tribune Silver Football, and the AP's male athlete of the year award.

Northwestern, under head coach Pappy Waldorf, finished in third place in the Big Ten with a 6–2 record and was ranked No. 8 in the final AP Poll. Northwestern's two losses were to No. 1 Minnesota (by one point) and No. 3 Michigan (by seven points). Northwestern tackle Alf Bauman was a consensus first-team All-American.

== Season overview ==
=== Results and team statistics ===
Conf. Rank	Team	Head coach	AP final	AP high	Overall record	Conf. record	PPG	PAG	MVP
1	Minnesota	Bernie Bierman	#1	#1	8–0	6–0	19.3	8.9	Bob Paffrath
2	Michigan	Fritz Crisler	#3	#3	7–1	3–1	24.5	4.3	Tom Harmon
3	Northwestern	Pappy Waldorf	#8	#4	6–2	4–2	21.3	8.0	Paul Hiemenz
4 (tie)	Ohio State	Francis Schmidt	NR	#15	4–4	3–3	12.4	14.1	Claude White
4 (tie)	Wisconsin	Harry Stuhldreher	NR	NR	4–4	3–3	15.6	16.8	George Paskvan
6 (tie)	Iowa	Eddie Anderson	NR	#20	4–4	2–3	15.6	12.3	Mike Enich
6 (tie)	Indiana	Bo McMillin	NR	NR	3–5	2–3	8.6	12.5	Dwight Gahm
8	Purdue	Mal Elward	NR	NR	2–6	1–4	12.0	13.3	Dave Rankin
9	Illinois	Robert Zuppke	NR	NR	1–7	0–5	8.9	18.0	George Bernhardt

Key
PPG = Average of points scored per game
PAG = Average of points allowed per game
MVP = Most valuable player as voted by players on each team as part of the voting process to determine the winner of the Chicago Tribune Silver Football trophy

=== Regular season ===
==== September 28 ====
On September 28, 1940, four Big Ten football teams opened their seasons with non-conference games. Those games resulted in four victories. Northwestern, Wisconsin, Iowa, Indiana, and Illinois had bye weeks.

- Minnesota 19, Washington 14.
- Michigan 41, California 0.
- Ohio State 30, Pittsburgh 7.
- Purdue 28, Butler 0.

==== October 5 ====
On October 5, 1940, the Big Ten football teams played one conference game and seven non-conference games. The non-conference games resulted in six wins and one loss, bringing the Big Ten's non-conference record to 10–1.

- Minnesota 13, Nebraska 7.
- Michigan 21, Michigan State 14.
- Northwestern 40, Syracuse 0.
- Ohio State 17, Purdue 14.
- Wisconsin 33, Marquette 19.
- Iowa 46, South Dakota 0.
- Texas 13, Indiana 6.
- Illinois 31, Bradley 0.

==== October 12 ====
On October 12, 1940, the Big Ten football teams played two conference games and four non-conference games. The non-conference games resulted in one win and three losses, bringing the Big Ten's non-conference record to 11–4. Minnesota had a bye week.

- Michigan 26, Harvard 0.
- Northwestern 6, Ohio State 3.
- Iowa 30, Wisconsin 12.
- Nebraska 13, Indiana 7.
- Michigan State 20, Purdue 7.
- USC 13, Illinois 7.

==== October 19 ====
On October 19, 1940, the Big Ten football teams played four conference games. Purdue had a bye week.

- Minnesota 13, Ohio State 7.
- Michigan 28, Illinois 0.
- Northwestern 27, Wisconsin 7.
- Indiana 10, Iowa 6.

==== October 26 ====
On October 26, 1940, the Big Ten football teams played three conference games and three non-conference games. The non-conference games resulted in one win and two losses, bringing the Big Ten's non-conference record to 12–6.

- Minnesota 34, Iowa 6.
- Michigan 14, Penn 0.
- Northwestern 20, Indiana 7.
- Cornell 21, Ohio State 7.
- Wisconsin 14, Purdue 13.
- Notre Dame 26, Illinois 0.

==== November 2 ====
On November 2, 1940, the Big Ten football teams played four conference games. Michigan had a bye week.

- Minnesota 13, Northwestern 12.
- Ohio State 21, Indiana 6.
- Wisconsin 13, Illinois 6.
- Purdue 21, Iowa 6.

==== November 9 ====
On November 9, 1940, the Big Ten football teams played two conference games and four non-conference games. The non-conference games resulted in one win and three losses, bringing the Big Ten's non-conference record to 13–9. Indiana had a bye week.

- Minnesota 7, Michigan 6.
- Northwestern 32, Illinois 14.
- Columbia 7, Wisconsin 6.
- Nebraska 14, Iowa 6.
- Indiana 20, Michigan State 0.
- Fordham 13, Purdue 7.

==== November 16 ====
On November 16, 1940, the Big Ten football teams played four conference games and one non-conference game. The non-conference game ended in a victory, bringing the Big Ten's non-conference record to 14–9.

- Minnesota 33, Purdue 6.
- Michigan 20, Northwestern 13.
- Ohio State 14, Illinois 6
- Wisconsin 27, Indiana 10.
- Iowa 7, Notre Dame 0.

==== November 23 ====
On November 23, 1940, the Big Ten football teams played four conference games and one non-conference game. The non-conference game ended in a victory, bringing the Big Ten's non-conference record to 15–9.

- Minnesota 22, Wisconsin 13.
- Michigan 40, Ohio State 0.
- Northwestern 20, Notre Dame 0.
- Iowa 18, Illinois 7.
- Indiana 3, Purdue 0.

=== Bowl games ===
During the 1940 season, the Big Ten maintained its long-standing ban on postseason games. Accordingly, no Big Ten teams participated in any bowl games.

== All-Big Ten players ==
The following players were picked by the Associated Press (AP) and/or the United Press (UP) as first-team players on the 1940 All-Big Ten Conference football team.

- Ed Frutig, end, Michigan (AP, UP)
- Dave Rankin, end, Purdue (AP, UP)
- Alf Bauman, tackle, Northwestern (AP, UP)
- Urban Odson, tackle, Minnesota (AP, UP)
- Ralph Fritz, guard, Michigan (AP, UP)
- Joe Lokane, guard, Northwestern (AP, UP)
- Paul Hiemenz, center, Northwestern (AP, UP)
- Forest Evashevski, quarterback, Michigan (AP)
- Don Scott, quarterback, Ohio State (UP)
- Tom Harmon, halfback, Michigan (AP, UP) (1940 Heisman Trophy winner)
- George Franck, halfback, Minnesota (AP, UP)
- George Paskvan, fullback, Wisconsin (AP, UP)

== All-Americans ==
At the end of the 1940 season, Big Ten players secured five of the 12 consensus first-team picks for the 1940 College Football All-America Team. The Big Ten's consensus All-Americans were:

- David Rankin, end, Purdue (AAB, CO, SN, UP, WC)
- Alf Bauman, tackle, Northwestern (AAB, CO, UP, NYS, WC)
- Urban Odson, tackle, Minnesota (INS, LIB, NW, CP)
- Tom Harmon, halfback, Michigan (AAB, AP, CO, INS, LIB, NEA, NW, SN, UP, CP, NYS, DH, FD, WC)
- George Franck, halfback, Minnesota (AAB, AP, CO, INS, LIB, NW, SN, UP, CP, DH, FD, NYS, WC)

Other Big Ten players who were named first-team All-Americans by at least one selector were:

- Ed Frutig, end, Michigan (INS, LIB)
- Mike Enich, tackle, Iowa (SN, DH, FD)
- Helge Pukema, guard, Minnesota (NEA)

== 1941 NFL draft ==
The following Big Ten players were selected in the 10th round of the 1941 NFL draft:

Name	Position	Team	Round	Overall pick
Tom Harmon	Halfback	Michigan	1	1
George Franck	Halfback	Minnesota	1	6
George Paskvan	Center	Wisconsin	1	7
Don Scott	Quarterback	Ohio State	1	9
Forest Evashevski	Quarterback	Michigan	1	10
Bob Paffrath	Back	Minnesota	3	21
Ed Frutig	End	Michigan	5	37
Eddie Rucinski	End	Indiana	6	49
Dave Rankin	End	Purdue	8	62
Bill Kuusisto	Guard	Minnesota	8	66
Ralph Fritz	Guard	Michigan	10	82
Mike Byelene	Back	Purdue	10	86
Jim Langhurst	Back	Ohio State	10	89
