= List of Minnesota Golden Gophers in the NFL draft =

This is a list of Minnesota Golden Gophers football players in the NFL draft.

== Key ==
B	Back	K	Kicker	NT	Nose tackle
C	Center	LB	Linebacker	FB	Fullback
DB	Defensive back	P	Punter	HB	Halfback
DE	Defensive end	QB	Quarterback	WR	Wide receiver
DT	Defensive tackle	RB	Running back	G	Guard
E	End	T	Offensive tackle	TE	Tight end

== Selections ==
Year	Round	Pick	Overall	Player	Team	Position
1936	2	4	13	Babe LeVoir	Brooklyn Dodgers	B
1936	3	6	24	George Roscoe	Chicago Bears	B
1936	4	8	35	Sheldon Beise	Detroit Lions	B
1936	5	6	42	Vern Oech	Chicago Bears	T
1936	7	6	60	Dick Smith	Chicago Bears	T
1936	8	8	71	Dale Rennebohm	Detroit Lions	C
1937	1	4	4	Ed Widseth	New York Giants	T
1937	2	10	20	Jules Alfonse	Cleveland Rams	B
1937	3	9	29	Bud Wilkinson	Green Bay Packers	T
1937	4	9	39	Bud Svendsen	Green Bay Packers	C
1937	10	1	91	Ray Antil	Philadelphia Eagles	E
1938	5	4	34	Lou Midler	Pittsburgh Steelers	T
1938	6	7	47	Andy Uram	Green Bay Packers	B
1938	7	4	54	Ray King	Pittsburgh Steelers	E
1938	12	1	101	Vic Spadaccini	Pittsburgh Steelers	E
1939	1	9	9	Larry Buhler	Green Bay Packers	B
1939	6	2	42	George Faust	Chicago Cardinals	B
1939	7	9	59	Frank Twedell	Green Bay Packers	T
1939	9	8	78	Wilbur Moore	Washington Redskins	B
1939	13	9	119	Dan Elmer	Green Bay Packers	C
1939	20	9	189	Charles Schultz	Green Bay Packers	T
1940	1	9	9	Hal Van Every	Green Bay Packers	B
1940	5	1	31	Marty Christiansen	Chicago Cardinals	B
1940	8	10	70	Win Pedersen	New York Giants	T
1941	1	6	6	George Franck	New York Giants	B
1941	3	6	21	Bob Paffrath	Green Bay Packers	B
1941	8	6	66	Bill Kuusisto	Green Bay Packers	G
1941	18	6	166	Helge Pukema	Green Bay Packers	G
1941	20	2	182	Bob Bjorklund	Pittsburgh Steelers	E
1942	1	9	9	Urban Odson	Green Bay Packers	T
1942	3	8	23	Bob Sweiger	New York Giants	B
1942	4	2	27	Len Levy	Cleveland Rams	G
1942	4	3	28	Gordon Paschka	Philadelphia Eagles	G
1942	7	6	56	Bob Fitch	Washington Redskins	E
1942	10	4	84	Jud Ringer	Chicago Cardinals	E
1942	10	9	89	Gene Flick	Green Bay Packers	C
1942	13	9	119	Bruce Smith	Green Bay Packers	B
1943	1	7	7	Bill Daley	Pittsburgh Steelers	B
1943	1	8	8	Dick Wildung	Green Bay Packers	T
1943	11	2	92	John Billman	Philadelphia Eagles	G
1943	13	3	113	Bill Baumgartner	Chicago Cardinals	E
1943	16	8	148	Mike Welch	Green Bay Packers	B
1943	19	6	176	Jim Lushine	New York Giants	T
1943	21	10	200	Don Nolander	Washington Redskins	C
1943	25	8	238	Gene Bierhaus	Green Bay Packers	E
1944	2	1	12	Paul Mitchell	Chicago Cardinals	T
1944	4	2	29	Rudy Sikich	Brooklyn Dodgers	T
1944	6	1	44	Bill Garnaas	Chicago Cardinals	B
1944	7	2	56	Bob Graiziger	Brooklyn Dodgers	G
1944	7	4	58	Vic Kulbitski	Philadelphia Eagles	B
1944	7	5	59	Herm Frickey	New York Giants	B
1944	10	3	90	Herb Hein	Detroit Lions	E
1944	10	9	96	John Perko	Philadelphia Eagles	E
1944	11	2	100	John Bicaninch	Brooklyn Dodgers	G
1944	11	7	105	Bill Aldworth	Washington Redskins	T
1944	22	6	205	Cliff Anderson	Green Bay Packers	E
1945	2	2	13	Wayne Williams	Brooklyn Dodgers	B
1945	6	9	52	Chuck Dellago	Philadelphia Eagles	G
1945	11	8	106	Chuck Avery	Chicago Bears	B
1945	17	11	175	Bob Kula	Green Bay Packers	B
1945	28	6	291	Bob Hary	Chicago Bears	B
1945	32	1	325	Don Nolander	Washington Redskins	T
1946	7	3	53	Tom Reinhardt	Pittsburgh Steelers	T
1946	19	8	178	Merlin Kispert	Detroit Lions	B
1946	20	5	185	Dick Kelly	New York Giants	B
1946	28	7	267	Dick Van Duesen	Detroit Lions	C
1947	16	10	145	Verne Gagne	Chicago Bears	E
1947	25	3	210	Tom Carroll	Chicago Cardinals	T
1948	6	6	41	Larry Olsonoski	Green Bay Packers	G
1949	9	2	83	Everett Faunce	Green Bay Packers	B
1949	17	3	164	Warren Beson	Boston Yanks	C
1950	1	4	4	Clayton Tonnemaker	Green Bay Packers	C
1950	1	11	11	Leo Nomellini	San Francisco 49ers	DT
1950	1	14	14	Bud Grant	Philadelphia Eagles	E
1950	3	3	30	Gordy Soltau	Green Bay Packers	E
1950	6	4	70	Floyd Jaszewski	Detroit Lions	T
1950	8	4	96	Ralph McAlister	Detroit Lions	B
1950	10	3	121	Bob Mealey	Green Bay Packers	T
1950	14	6	176	Gene Fritz	New York Giants	T
1950	16	3	199	Frank Kuzma	Green Bay Packers	B
1950	19	9	244	Billy Bye	Chicago Bears	B
1950	25	6	319	Ken Beiersdorf	New York Giants	B
1950	29	5	370	Johnny Lundin	Washington Redskins	G
1950	30	10	388	Allen Markert	Chicago Bears	T
1951	21	1	244	Art Edling	Green Bay Packers	E
1952	8	4	89	Wayne Robinson	Philadelphia Eagles	C
1952	22	7	260	Dick Gregory	Chicago Bears	B
1952	24	7	284	Dick Mundinger	Chicago Bears	T
1952	28	6	311	Ron Engel	Washington Redskins	B
1953	9	9	106	Roger French	Philadelphia Eagles	E
1953	9	10	107	Bob McNamara	Cleveland Browns	B
1953	24	8	285	Charley Kubes	New York Giants	G
1953	26	1	302	Scott Prescott	Baltimore Colts	C
1953	30	7	356	Stavros Canakes	New York Giants	G
1954	9	5	102	Paul Giel	Chicago Bears	B
1954	11	5	162	Ron Wallin	Chicago Bears	T
1954	28	7	332	Ron Hansen	Washington Redskins	E
1955	23	2	267	Dick McNamara	Baltimore Colts	B
1955	23	5	270	Gordy Holz	Pittsburgh Steelers	T
1955	26	5	306	Gordy Soltau	Pittsburgh Steelers	E
1956	13	9	154	Dick Grogg	Chicago Bears	G
1956	20	8	237	Mike Falls	New York Giants	G
1956	25	7	296	Franz Koeneke	Green Bay Packers	E
1957	4	1	38	Bobby Cox	Los Angeles Rams	QB
1957	6	12	73	Bob Hobert	New York Giants	T
1957	16	2	183	Ed Buckingham	Green Bay Packers	T
1957	19	9	226	Paul Barrington	Chicago Cardinals	G
1957	26	3	304	Dick Blakely	Los Angeles Rams	B
1957	28	2	327	Dave Herbold	Green Bay Packers	G
1957	29	2	339	Dean Maas	Los Angeles Rams	C
1957	29	5	342	Bob Rasmussen	Baltimore Colts	G
1958	2	10	23	Frank Youso	New York Giants	T
1958	7	1	74	Jon Jelacic	Chicago Cardinals	E
1958	14	2	159	Bob Schmidt	Chicago Cardinals	T
1958	15	8	177	Norm Sixta	New York Giants	T
1958	17	9	202	Jim Reese	Baltimore Colts	B
1958	26	9	310	David Burkholder	New York Giants	G
1958	27	5	318	Perry Gehring	Washington Redskins	E
1958	30	10	359	Ben Svendsen	Cleveland Browns	C
1959	9	12	108	Tom Brown	Baltimore Colts	G
1959	16	10	190	Bob Soltis	New York Giants	B
1959	20	10	238	Jerry Shetler	New York Giants	G
1959	30	7	355	Willus Fjerstad	Pittsburgh Steelers	B
1960	4	7	43	Billy Martin	Chicago Bears	B
1960	6	5	65	Mike Wright	Green Bay Packers	T
1960	9	5	101	Frank Brixius	Green Bay Packers	T
1961	6	11	81	Greg Larson	New York Giants	C
1961	10	2	128	Roger Hagberg	Green Bay Packers	B
1962	2	11	25	Sandy Stephens	Cleveland Browns	B
1962	7	10	94	Tom Hall	Detroit Lions	E
1962	20	5	271	Judge Dickson	St. Louis Cardinals	B
1963	2	2	16	Bobby Bell	Minnesota Vikings	T
1963	4	9	51	Bill Munsey	Cleveland Browns	B
1963	7	1	56	Bobby Bell	Kansas City Chiefs	LB
1963	11	3	143	John Campbell	Minnesota Vikings	LB
1964	1	6	6	Carl Eller	Minnesota Vikings	DT
1964	20	5	271	Milt Sunde	Minnesota Vikings	T
1965	5	4	60	Frank Marchlewski	Los Angeles Rams	C
1965	8	2	100	John Hankinson	Minnesota Vikings	QB
1965	12	4	158	Craig Lofquist	Pittsburgh Steelers	B
1966	1	13	13	Gale Gillingham	Green Bay Packers	T
1966	9	8	133	Kent Kramer	San Francisco 49ers	WR
1966	13	8	193	Jim Fulgham	New York Giants	T
1966	20	6	296	Lou Hudson	Dallas Cowboys	WR
1967	5	8	115	Ken Last	Minnesota Vikings	WR
1967	14	9	350	Chet Anderson	Pittsburgh Steelers	TE
1968	1	23	23	John Williams	Baltimore Colts	T
1968	3	18	74	Charlie Sanders	Detroit Lions	TE
1968	10	4	250	Tom Sakal	Minnesota Vikings	DB
1968	15	15	396	McKinley Boston	New York Giants	G
1968	17	11	447	Bob Lee	St. Louis Cardinals	WR
1969	4	7	85	Dennis Hale	New Orleans Saints	DB
1969	4	26	104	Ezell Jones	New York Jets	T
1969	5	22	126	Bob Stein	Kansas City Chiefs	LB
1969	7	2	158	Dick Enderle	Atlanta Falcons	G
1969	9	17	225	Tom Fink	Minnesota Vikings	G
1969	9	20	228	Ron Kamzelski	Cleveland Browns	DT
1969	12	17	303	Noel Jenke	Minnesota Vikings	LB
1969	14	21	359	Ray Stephens	Los Angeles Rams	RB
1970	2	19	45	Ray Parson	Detroit Lions	DT
1970	3	16	68	Jim Carter	Green Bay Packers	LB
1971	9	10	218	Barry Mayer	Green Bay Packers	RB
1971	9	16	224	Alvin Hawes	Kansas City Chiefs	T
1971	12	4	290	John Thompson	Houston Oilers	G
1971	15	24	388	Jeff Wright	Minnesota Vikings	DB
1971	16	9	399	Steve Thompson	Denver Broncos	DT
1972	3	7	59	Bart Buetow	Minnesota Vikings	T
1972	6	10	140	Mike Perfetti	Atlanta Falcons	DB
1972	6	14	144	Vern Winfield	Philadelphia Eagles	G
1972	8	25	207	Craig Curry	Miami Dolphins	QB
1972	11	11	271	Bill Light	Buffalo Bills	LB
1972	14	16	354	Tom Chandler	Atlanta Falcons	LB
1973	3	22	74	Tom MacLeod	Green Bay Packers	LB
1973	6	9	139	Doug Kingsriter	Minnesota Vikings	TE
1973	9	21	229	Mike White	Dallas Cowboys	DB
1973	13	21	333	Tim Alderson	Green Bay Packers	DB
1973	17	13	429	Dave Winfield	Minnesota Vikings	TE
1974	2	9	35	Keith Fahnhorst	San Francisco 49ers	TE
1974	4	16	94	Matt Herkenhoff	Kansas City Chiefs	T
1974	5	7	111	Steve Neils	St. Louis Cardinals	LB
1974	12	6	292	Dave Simonson	Baltimore Colts	T
1975	4	17	95	Rick Upchurch	Denver Broncos	WR
1975	11	8	268	Dale Hegland	Kansas City Chiefs	G
1975	15	24	388	Ollie Bakken	Minnesota Vikings	LB
1976	3	3	63	Keith Simons	Kansas City Chiefs	DT
1976	8	18	227	Art Meadowcroft	Buffalo Bills	G
1976	9	6	243	Doug Beaudoin	New England Patriots	DB
1976	11	21	312	Dexter Pride	Miami Dolphins	RB
1977	9	2	225	George Adzick	Seattle Seahawks	DB
1977	10	4	255	Mike Jones	New York Giants	WR
1978	2	3	31	Mark Merrill	New York Jets	LB
1978	2	6	34	Michael Hunt	Green Bay Packers	LB
1978	2	15	43	Steve Stewart	Atlanta Falcons	LB
1978	12	9	315	Mark Slater	Philadelphia Eagles	C
1978	12	20	326	Jeff Morrow	Minnesota Vikings	T
1979	6	26	163	Jim Ronan	Cleveland Browns	DT
1979	7	11	176	Stan Sytsma	New Orleans Saints	LB
1979	7	22	187	Keith Brown	New York Jets	DB
1980	4	17	100	Elmer Bailey	Miami Dolphins	WR
1980	6	23	161	Greg Murtha	Philadelphia Eagles	T
1981	2	2	30	Marion Barber Jr.	New York Jets	RB
1981	7	10	176	Jeff Schuh	Cincinnati Bengals	LB
1981	8	10	203	Garry White	San Francisco 49ers	RB
1982	4	9	92	Jim Fahnhorst	Minnesota Vikings	LB
1982	5	6	117	Wally Kersten	Los Angeles Rams	T
1982	5	13	124	Ken Dallafior	Pittsburgh Steelers	T
1982	8	6	201	Chester Cooper	Seattle Seahawks	WR
1983	8	28	224	Todd Hallstrom	Washington Redskins	T
1983	12	3	310	Karl Mecklenburg	Denver Broncos	LB
1984	7	1	169	Jay Carroll	Tampa Bay Buccaneers	TE
1984	8	24	220	Randy Rasmussen	Pittsburgh Steelers	C
1984	10	2	254	Jim Gallery	Tampa Bay Buccaneers	K
1985	9	18	242	Andre Harris	Pittsburgh Steelers	DB
1985	10	10	262	Kerry Glenn	New York Jets	DB
1985	12	3	311	Mark Haar	Houston Oilers	DT
1986	9	3	224	Kevin Starks	Atlanta Falcons	TE
1987	4	21	105	Mark Dusbabek	Houston Oilers	LB
1987	12	18	325	Bruce Holmes	Kansas City Chiefs	LB
1987	12	24	331	Ray Hitchcock	Washington Redskins	C
1988	2	28	55	Chip Lohmiller	Washington Redskins	K
1988	5	6	115	Troy Wolkow	New England Patriots	G
1988	8	3	196	Gary Hadd	Detroit Lions	DE
1988	9	26	247	Brian Bonner	San Francisco 49ers	LB
1988	11	25	302	Gary Couch	New Orleans Saints	WR
1989	1	18	18	Brian Williams	New York Giants	C
1990	1	19	19	Darrell Thompson	Green Bay Packers	RB
1990	5	4	113	Jon Melander	New England Patriots	T
1990	11	21	297	Jon Leverenz	Washington Redskins	LB
1990	12	20	324	Ron Goetz	Minnesota Vikings	LB
1991	5	8	119	Chris Thome	Minnesota Vikings	C
1991	11	9	287	Mike Sunvold	Tampa Bay Buccaneers	DT
1991	12	15	321	Mark Drabczak	New Orleans Saints	G
1992	4	22	106	Sean Lumpkin	New Orleans Saints	DB
1996	4	28	123	Chris Darkins	Green Bay Packers	RB
1996	6	21	188	Craig Sauer	Atlanta Falcons	LB
1998	6	26	179	Lamanzer Williams	Jacksonville Jaguars	DE
1998	7	26	215	Ryan Thelwell	San Francisco 49ers	WR
2000	4	24	118	Tyrone Carter	Minnesota Vikings	DB
2000	6	5	171	Thomas Hamner	Philadelphia Eagles	RB
2001	1	24	24	Willie Middlebrooks	Denver Broncos	DB
2001	4	8	103	Karon Riley	Chicago Bears	DE
2001	4	18	113	Ben Hamilton	Denver Broncos	C
2001	6	36	199	Adam Haayer	Tennessee Titans	G
2002	4	25	123	Ron Johnson	Baltimore Ravens	WR
2002	6	6	178	Matt Anderle	San Diego Chargers	T
2002	7	18	229	Stylez G. White	Houston Texans	DE
2003	5	17	152	Michael Lehan	Cleveland Browns	DB
2004	5	30	162	Thomas Tapeh	Philadelphia Eagles	FB
2005	4	8	109	Marion Barber III	Dallas Cowboys	RB
2006	1	21	21	Laurence Maroney	New England Patriots	RB
2006	5	20	153	Anthony Montgomery	Washington Redskins	DT
2006	6	29	198	Greg Eslinger	Denver Broncos	C
2006	7	34	242	Mark Setterstrom	St. Louis Rams	G
2007	3	13	77	Matt Spaeth	Pittsburgh Steelers	TE
2008	6	7	173	Dominique Barber	Houston Texans	DB
2010	3	23	87	Eric Decker	Denver Broncos	WR
2010	5	36	167	Nate Triplett	Minnesota Vikings	LB
2014	2	5	37	Ra'Shede Hageman	Atlanta Falcons	DT
2014	4	31	131	Brock Vereen	Chicago Bears	DB
2015	2	23	55	Maxx Williams	Baltimore Ravens	TE
2015	4	28	127	Damien Wilson	Dallas Cowboys	LB
2015	5	2	138	David Cobb	Tennessee Titans	RB
2015	5	14	150	Cedric Thompson	Miami Dolphins	DB
2016	4	8	106	Eric Murray	Kansas City Chiefs	DB
2016	4	17	115	De'Vondre Campbell	Atlanta Falcons	LB
2017	7	4	222	Jalen Myrick	Jacksonville Jaguars	DB
2019	5	19	157	Blake Cashman	New York Jets	LB
2020	2	13	45	Antoine Winfield Jr.	Tampa Bay Buccaneers	DB
2020	5	15	161	Tyler Johnson	Tampa Bay Buccaneers	WR
2020	5	29	175	Kamal Martin	Green Bay Packers	LB
2020	7	4	218	Carter Coughlin	New York Giants	LB
2020	7	33	274	Chris Williamson	New York Giants	DB
2021	1	27	27	Rashod Bateman	Baltimore Ravens	WR
2021	3	10	74	Benjamin St-Juste	Washington Football Team	DB
2022	2	8	40	Boye Mafe	Seattle Seahawks	DE
2022	4	5	110	Daniel Faalele	Baltimore Ravens	T
2022	5	22	165	Esezi Otomewo	Minnesota Vikings	DE
2022	6	39	218	Ko Kieft	Tampa Bay Buccaneers	TE
2023	2	26	57	John Michael Schmitz	New York Giants	C
2023	5	11	146	Jordan Howden	New Orleans Saints	DB
2023	5	30	165	Terell Smith	Chicago Bears	DB
2024	2	15	47	Tyler Nubin	New York Giants	DB
2025	2	16	48	Aireontae Ersery	Houston Texans	T
2025	3	16	80	Justin Walley	Indianapolis Colts	DB
2025	7	6	222	Cody Lindenberg	Las Vegas Raiders	LB
2026	7	26	242	Deven Eastern	Seattle Seahawks	DT

== Notable undrafted players ==
Note: No drafts held before 1920

Debut Year	Player	Position	Debut Team	Notes
1968	Hubie Bryant	WR	Cleveland Browns	—
1975	Greg Engebos	CB	Chicago Bears	—
1977	Tony Dungy	S	Pittsburgh Steelers	—
1980	Steve Tobin	C	New York Giants	—
1981	Dana Noel	CB	Pittsburgh Steelers	—
1983	Kevin Kellin	DT	Washington Redskins	—
1985	Tony Hunter	RB	Washington Redskins	—
1986	Jerry Keeble	LB	San Francisco 49ers	—
1987	Mel Anderson	WR	Pittsburgh Steelers	—
1987	Jim Hobbins	G	Green Bay Packers	—
1987	Larry Joyner	S	Houston Oilers	—
1987	Donovan Small	S	Houston Oilers	—
1987	Steve Thompson	DT	Washington Redskins	—
1994	Tony Carter	FB	Minnesota Vikings	—
1994	Omar Douglas	WR	New York Giants	—
1995	Ed Hawthorne	NT	Miami Dolphins	—
1998	Cory Sauter	QB	Arizona Cardinals	—
2000	Derek Rackley	LS	Atlanta Falcons	—
2000	Jimmy Wyrick	CB	Detroit Lions	—
2002	Jack Brewer	S	Minnesota Vikings	—
2002	Travis Cole	QB	Pittsburgh Steelers	—
2004	Ben Utecht	TE	Indianapolis Colts	—
2005	Paris Hamilton	WR	Detroit Lions	—
2005	Rhys Lloyd	K	Baltimore Ravens	—
2005	Darrell Reid	LB	Indianapolis Colts	—
2007	Logan Payne	WR	Seattle Seahawks	—
2008	Ernie Wheelwright	WR	Baltimore Ravens	—
2010	Marcus Sherels	DB	Minnesota Vikings	—
2011	Jon Hoese	FB	Green Bay Packers	—
2011	Adam Weber	QB	Denver Broncos	—
2012	Du’ane Bennett	RB	Green Bay Packers	—
2012	Eric Lair	TE	Green Bay Packers	—
2013	MarQueis Gray	TE	San Francisco 49ers	—
2015	Isaac Fruechte	WR	Minnesota Vikings	—
2016	Briean Boddy-Calhoun	CB	Jacksonville Jaguars	—
2016	K. J. Maye	WR	New York Giants	—
2017	Jack Lynn	LB	Atlanta Falcons	—
2017	Damarius Travis	S	New England Patriots	—
2018	Nate Wozniak	TE	New Orleans Saints	—
2019	Donnell Greene	OL	Jacksonville Jaguars	—
2022	Jack Gibbens	LB	Tennessee Titans	—
2023	Chuck Filiaga	G	Green Bay Packers	—
2023	Mohamed Ibrahim	RB	Detroit Lions	—
2023	Tanner Morgan	QB	Pittsburgh Steelers	—
2024	Kyler Baugh	DT	New Orleans Saints	—
2024	Corey Crooms	WR	Dallas Cowboys	—
2024	Brevyn Spann-Ford	TE	Dallas Cowboys	—
2025	Max Brosmer	QB	Minnesota Vikings	—
2025	Tyler Cooper	G	Green Bay Packers	—
2025	Jah Joyner	DE	Las Vegas Raiders	—
2025	Nick Kallerup	TE	Seattle Seahawks	—
2025	Ethan Robinson	CB	Miami Dolphins	—
2025	Danny Striggow	DE	Jacksonville Jaguars	—
2026	Jameson Geers	TE	Arizona Cardinals	—
