= 1940 Wisconsin Badgers football team =

American college football season

1940 Wisconsin Badgers football
- Conference: Big Ten Conference
- Record: 4–4 (3–3 Big Ten)
- Head coach: Harry Stuhldreher (5th season)
- MVP: George Paskvan
- Captain: John Tennant
- Home stadium: Camp Randall Stadium

1940 Big Ten Conference football standings
	Conf.					Overall
Team	W		L		T	W		L		T
No. 1 Minnesota $	6	–	0	–	0	8	–	0	–	0
No. 3 Michigan	3	–	1	–	0	7	–	1	–	0
No. 8 Northwestern	4	–	2	–	0	6	–	2	–	0
Ohio State	3	–	3	–	0	4	–	4	–	0
Wisconsin	3	–	3	–	0	4	–	4	–	0
Iowa	2	–	3	–	0	4	–	4	–	0
Indiana	2	–	3	–	0	3	–	5	–	0
Purdue	1	–	4	–	0	2	–	6	–	0
Illinois	0	–	5	–	0	1	–	7	–	0
$ – Conference champion; Rankings from AP Poll

The 1940 Wisconsin Badgers football team was an American football team that represented the University of Wisconsin in the 1940 Big Ten Conference football season. The team compiled a 4–4 record (3–3 against conference opponents) and finished in a tie for fourth place in the Big Ten Conference. Harry Stuhldreher was in his fifth year as Wisconsin's head coach.

Fullback George Paskvan was selected by the Associated Press (AP) as a second-team player, and by the United Press (UP) as a third-team player, on the 1940 College Football All-America Team. He was also selected by both the AP and UP as a first-team player on the 1940 All-Big Ten Conference football team, and as Wisconsin's most valuable player. John Tennant was the team captain.

Wisconsin was ranked at No. 27 (out of 697 college football teams) in the final rankings under the Litkenhous Difference by Score system for 1940.

The team played its home games at Camp Randall Stadium which was expanded to a capacity of 45,000 for the 1940 season. During the 1940 season, the average attendance at home games was 26,277.

== Schedule ==
Date	Opponent	Site	Result	Attendance	Source
October 5	Marquette*	Camp Randall Stadium; Madison, WI	W 33–19	35,000	
October 12	at Iowa	Iowa Stadium; Iowa City, IA (rivalry)	L 12–30		
October 19	No. 4 Northwestern	Camp Randall Stadium; Madison, WI	L 7–27	25,000	
October 26	at Purdue	Ross–Ade Stadium; West Lafayette, IN	W 14–13	22,000	
November 2	Illinois^{†}	Camp Randall Stadium; Madison, WI	W 13–6	28,000	
November 9	at Columbia*	Baker Field; New York, NY	L 6–7	20,000	
November 16	Indiana	Camp Randall Stadium; Madison, WI	W 27–10		
November 23	No. 1 Minnesota	Camp Randall Stadium; Madison, WI (rivalry)	L 13–22	38,000	
*Non-conference game; ^{†}Homecoming; Rankings from AP Poll released prior to the game

Star fullback George Paskvan carries the ball against Illinois on the cover of the 1941 NCAA Football Guide.
