= Ed Frutig =

American football player (1918–2011)

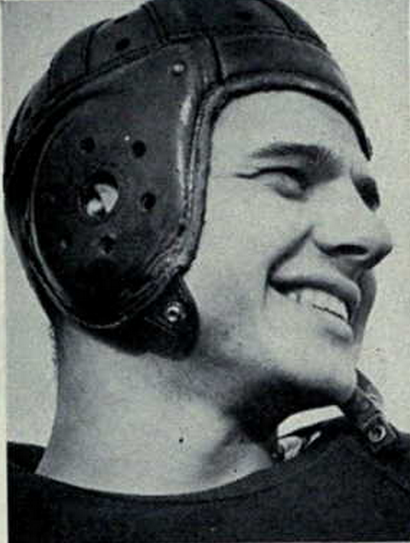

No. 51, 80, 11
- Position: End

Personal information
- Born: August 19, 1918; River Rouge, Michigan, U.S.
- Died: February 26, 2011 (aged 92); Vero Beach, Florida, U.S.
- Listed height: 6 ft 1 in (1.85 m)
- Listed weight: 190 lb (86 kg)

Career information
- High school: River Rouge
- College: Michigan (1937-1940)
- NFL draft: 1941: 5th round, 37th overall pick

Career history
- Green Bay Packers (1941, 1945); Detroit Lions (1945–1946)

Awards and highlights
- First-team All-American (1940); First-team All-Big Ten (1940)

Career NFL statistics
- Receptions: 12
- Receiving yards: 117
- Receiving touchdowns: 3
- Stats at Pro Football Reference

Edward C. Frutig (August 19, 1918 – February 26, 2011) was an American professional football end who played for the University of Michigan Wolverines from 1938 to 1940. He was selected as a first-team All-American in 1940 by William Randolph Hearst's International News Service. A teammate of Heisman Trophy winner Tom Harmon for three years at Michigan, Frutig was Harmon's main receiver, and played in the National Football League (NFL) with the Green Bay Packers (1941, 1945) and Detroit Lions (1945–1946).

== Early life ==
Born and raised in River Rouge, Michigan, Frutig was the son of a River Rouge councilman.

== 1938 season ==
Frutig attended the University of Michigan from 1937 to 1941. He came to Michigan with very little football reputation and is reported to have “barely made the freshman squad” in 1937. Frutig put himself through college by covering Ann Arbor for a Detroit newspaper.

As a sophomore in 1938, he was part of coach Fritz Crisler's first Michigan football team. This was the year that Crisler introduced the Winged Helmet at Michigan. He was “just another varsity candidate as a sophomore” in 1938 but before the season was over, he was “the best end” on the team. “That's real development,” said Fielding H. Yost. Going into the 1938 season, Michigan had not scored a touchdown against Ohio State in four years. On November 19, the drought ended as Michigan beat the Buckeyes, 18–0. In the fourth quarter, Frutig caught two passes from Tom Harmon, one a 22-yard pass to the 18-yard line and then a five-yard pass for a touchdown.

== 1939 season ==
As the 1939 season got underway, former Michigan head coach Fielding H. Yost called Frutig the greatest Michigan pass receiver since Bennie Oosterbaan. Yost said, "He's got the grace and the speed. And the tips of his fingers appear coated with glue." Frutig was also described as “a sweet defensive player.”

In the Big Ten opener against Iowa, Frutig caught a 27-yard pass from Tom Harmon and was pushed out of bounds at the two-yard line to set up Michigan's first touchdown in a 27–7 win. However, he suffered a twisted knee in the Iowa game and did not play against Chicago. He came back in the Minnesota game but was injured again, with a dislocated ankle tendon, and did not play the rest of the season.

== 1940 season ==
Frutig finally put together a complete season as a senior in 1940. He started all eight games at end as the Wolverines went 7–1 and were ranked third in the final AP poll. The only loss was a 7–6 defeat to Minnesota. The 1940 season was the year Tom Harmon won the Heisman Trophy and Frutig's accomplishments were largely overshadowed. In Michigan's eight games, Frutig had 12 receptions for 181 yards (over 15 yards per catch) and three touchdowns. He also blocked five punts and won a reputation as a superior defensive player.

As the 1940 season was about to start, Yost said that Frutig was the best pass catcher he had seen in ten years, though he admitted Frutig was "not the best wingman" in other areas of play.

In the season opener against the California Bears, Michigan won 41–0 and Frutig blocked one of Reinhard's punts, setting up Harmon's fifth touchdown. In the second period against Illinois, Frutig caught a Harmon pass at the 25-yard line and ran untouched across the goal line. On the next possession, Illinois drove the ball to the Michigan 12-yard line, but Frutig intercepted a Pfeffer pass to end the threat.

Against Pennsylvania, Frutig made a “leaping catch on the goal line” for a touchdown on a pass from Harmon, as the Wolverines won, 14–0. Frutig played all 60 minutes against Penn and said afterward he could have played 60 minutes more. “Of course,” Frutig added, “I'd need that boy Al Wistert right by me if I had to play much more than the regulation time.”

The season's only loss came to Minnesota in a close 7–6 game. Frutig nearly won the game for Michigan as he blocked a George Franck punt, which Reuben Kelto recovered on the Minnesota three-yard line. But Minnesota intercepted Harmon's pass in the end zone, and Michigan lost by one point. Harmon had also missed a point after touchdown kick earlier in the game. Despite the loss, one columnist said of Frutig's performance against Minnesota: “The best end I saw all year I saw in this game. That was Frutig of Michigan and that goes for offense and defense. He ruined about six coming in there trying to block those Gopher punts. He did block one.”

Against Northwestern, Frutig blocked a punt from the end zone to set up Harmon's 30th touchdown of the season. In his final game in the Michigan uniform, a 40–0 win over Ohio State, Frutig caught his third touchdown pass of the season.

Aside from his pass receiving and defense, Frutig won praise as a punt blocker. In Michigan's eight games in 1940, Frutig “personally blocked five punts, all of them at a crucial moments.” Oddly, despite numerous accounts referencing his punt blocking exploits, Frutig is not listed among NCAA Division I players to have blocked as many as three punts in a season.

Frutig was a first-team All-American pick by Hearst Publications' International News Service and football writer Maxwell Stiles. Frutig was selected as a third-team All-American by UP, AP and Central Press Association. He was chosen by conference coaches as a first-team player on the Associated Press All-Big Ten Conference team.

Frutig, Harmon and Forest Evashevski teamed up one last time in the 16th annual East-West Shrine Charity Football Game in San Francisco on New Year's Day 1941. Evashevski and Frutig scored the East's only touchdowns, with Frutig scoring on a 21-yard pass from Harmon into the end zone. Frutig leaped high to grab Harmon's pass “while boxed in between two West defense men.”

== Professional football and military service ==
Frutig was selected by the Green Bay Packers in the third round of the 1941 NFL draft, and played for the team in 1941. However, when the United States entered World War II, Frutig enlisted in the U.S. Navy where he earned his wings as a naval aviator. While serving in the Navy, Frutig was named to the All-Navy All-American football team in 1942. He also played for the 1942 Corpus Christi Naval Air Station Comets football team that compiled a 4–3–1 record playing against southwest college teams. He also served as a flight instructor at a naval air base at Grosse Ile, Michigan.

== Later life ==
In the early 1950s, Frutig served as the end coach at Washington State College in Pullman. College teammate Forest Evashevski was the Cougars' head coach, and recruited him to the WSC coaching staff in 1950. Frutig was credited with developing end Ed Barker, who broke two Pacific Coast Conference (PCC) pass-catching records in 1951. After two seasons, he resigned in December 1951 to take a job with an advertising firm in East Lansing, Michigan, and went on to become successful in the advertising business. In 1967, Frutig and Bob Westfall were the leaders of the Alumni for Evy Committee, organized to bring Evashevski to Michigan as both head football coach and athletic director. Instead, Bo Schembechler and Don Canham were hired to the jobs.

Frutig's daughter, Suzy Bales, has published thirteen books about gardening, including "The Garden in Winter" published in 2007.

== Honors and accolades ==
- Selected a first-team All-American by the Hearst newspaper syndicate in 1940.
- Inducted into the University of Michigan Hall of Honor in 1988.
- In 2005, Frutig was selected as one of the 100 greatest Michigan football players of all time by the "Motown Sports Revival," ranking 87th on the all-time team.

== See also ==
- University of Michigan Athletic Hall of Honor

== Notes ==
See discussion on this article's talk page regarding controversies as to Frutig's birth year, listed in some sources as 1920, and concerning conflicting sources as to whether Frutig blocked five punts in 1940.
