= 1940 Michigan Wolverines football team =

American college football season

1940 Michigan Wolverines football
- Conference: Big Ten Conference

Ranking
- AP: No. 3
- Record: 7–1 (3–1 Big Ten)
- Head coach: Fritz Crisler (3rd season)
- Offensive scheme: Single-wing
- MVP: Tom Harmon
- Captain: Forest Evashevski
- Home stadium: Michigan Stadium

1940 Big Ten Conference football standings
| | Conf. | | | | | Overall |
| Team | W | | L | | T | W | | L | | T |
|---|---|---|---|---|---|---|---|---|---|---|
| No. 1 Minnesota $ | 6 | – | 0 | – | 0 | 8 | – | 0 | – | 0 |
| No. 3 Michigan | 3 | – | 1 | – | 0 | 7 | – | 1 | – | 0 |
| No. 8 Northwestern | 4 | – | 2 | – | 0 | 6 | – | 2 | – | 0 |
| Ohio State | 3 | – | 3 | – | 0 | 4 | – | 4 | – | 0 |
| Wisconsin | 3 | – | 3 | – | 0 | 4 | – | 4 | – | 0 |
| Iowa | 2 | – | 3 | – | 0 | 4 | – | 4 | – | 0 |
| Indiana | 2 | – | 3 | – | 0 | 3 | – | 5 | – | 0 |
| Purdue | 1 | – | 4 | – | 0 | 2 | – | 6 | – | 0 |
| Illinois | 0 | – | 5 | – | 0 | 1 | – | 7 | – | 0 |
$ – Conference champion; Rankings from AP Poll

The 1940 Michigan Wolverines football team represented the University of Michigan in the 1940 Big Ten Conference football season. Under third-year head coach Fritz Crisler, Michigan compiled a 7–1 record and finished the season ranked No. 3 in the final AP Poll. The team outscored opponents 196 to 34. The team's sole setback was a 7–6 loss on the road against a Minnesota team that finished the season No. 1 in the final AP Poll.

The 1940 team featured one of the greatest backfields in Michigan football history with all four principal starters going on to be inducted into the College Football Hall of Fame as either a player or coach. Left halfback Tom Harmon was a consensus All-American and the winner of the Heisman Trophy as the best overall player in college football. Harmon became the focus of nationwide media coverage, even appearing on the cover of Life magazine in November 1940. Quarterback Forest Evashevski won the Big Ten Medal as the school's best senior student-athlete and was later referred to by Coach Crisler as "the greatest quarterback I ever had." Fullback Bob Westfall, known as "Bullet Bob," was the country's fourth leading rusher in 1940, gaining 808 yards in eight games. (Harmon had 852 rushing yards.) Westfall went on to become a consensus All-American in 1941 and also won All-Pro honors for the Detroit Lions in 1945. David M. Nelson, who started the most games at right halfback, went on to a 20-year career as a college football coach and was inducted into the College Football Hall of Fame as a coach.

The line playing in front of Michigan's Hall of Fame backfield was also one of the best in school history with four of the seven starters going on to play in the NFL. Left tackle Al Wistert had his jersey retired at Michigan, was inducted into the College Football Hall of Fame, and was an eight-time All-Pro selection for the Philadelphia Eagles. Left guard Ralph Fritz was a first-team All-Big Ten player in 1940 and later played for the Philadelphia Eagles. Center Robert Ingalls played for the Green Bay Packers and later served for 12 years as the head football coach at Connecticut. End Ed Frutig, who was Harmon's principal receiver, was selected as a first-team member of the 1940 College Football All-America Team and later played for the Green Bay Packers and Detroit Lions.

A fifth starter on the 1940 line, Milo Sukup, was the running guard and one of the principal blockers for Harmon and Westfall. Harmon in 1940 publicly praised Sukup and Fritz as "two big reasons for Harmon." Sukup was reportedly on track for selection as an All-American until he suffered a career-ending injury late in the season. In a November 1940 game against Illinois, Sukup suffered a blow to the head while blocking for Harmon. He was knocked unconscious, suffered from temporary amnesia and was later hospitalized for several days after suffering recurring headaches. Sukup was propped up in a bed at University Hospital when the Wolverines left to play Minnesota and listened by radio from his hospital bed as the team suffered its only loss of the season. Sukup missed the last three games of the season due to the concussion and did not compete further as a football player. Robert Kolesar, who replaced Sukup at right guard for the last two games, went on to play for the Cleveland Browns.

== Schedule ==
| Date | Opponent | Rank | Site | Result | Attendance |
|---|---|---|---|---|---|
| September 28 | at California* | | California Memorial Stadium; Berkeley, CA | W 41–0 | 35,401 |
| October 5 | Michigan State* | | Michigan Stadium; Ann Arbor, MI (rivalry) | W 21–14 | 69,951 |
| October 12 | at Harvard* | | Harvard Stadium; Boston, MA | W 26–0 | 26,315 |
| October 19 | Illinois^{†} | | Michigan Stadium; Ann Arbor, MI (rivalry) | W 28–0 | 39,975 |
| October 26 | No. 8 Penn* | No. 3 | Michigan Stadium; Ann Arbor, MI | W 14–0 | 62,262 |
| November 9 | at No. 2 Minnesota | No. 3 | Memorial Stadium; Minneapolis, MN (Little Brown Jug) | L 6–7 | 60,481 |
| November 16 | No. 10 Northwestern | No. 6 | Michigan Stadium; Ann Arbor, MI (rivalry) | W 20–13 | 75,099 |
| November 23 | at Ohio State | No. 7 | Ohio Stadium; Columbus, OH (rivalry) | W 40–0 | 73,480 |
*Non-conference game; ^{†}Homecoming; Rankings from AP Poll released prior to the game

== Rankings ==
Ranking movements Legend: ██ Increase in ranking ██ Decrease in ranking ( ) = First-place votes
| | Week | | | | | | | |
| Poll | 1 | 2 | 3 | 4 | 5 | 6 | 7 | Final |
|---|---|---|---|---|---|---|---|---|
| AP | 3 (26) | 3 (18) | 3 (16) | 3 (11) | 6 | 7 | 5 (3) | 3 (5) |

== Game summaries ==
=== Week 1: at California ===
Week 1: Michigan at California

| Team | 1 | 2 | 3 | 4 | Total |
|---|---|---|---|---|---|
| • Michigan | 7 | 14 | 7 | 13 | 41 |
| California | 0 | 0 | 0 | 0 | 0 |

- Date: September 28, 1940
- Location: California Memorial Stadium
  Berkeley, CA
- Game attendance: 35,401
- Referee: Dr. Louis G. Conlan (St. Mary's)

On September 28, 1940, Michigan opened its season on the road playing the California Golden Bears at Berkeley, California. The game was the first played between the two football programs. Michigan won the game by a score of 41 to 0. While celebrating his 21st birthday, Michigan halfback Tom Harmon scored four touchdowns, kicked four points after touchdown (PAT), and threw a touchdown pass to David M. Nelson. Cliff Wise also scored a touchdown for Michigan, after coming into the game as a substitute for Harmon in the second half, and William Melzow kicked the PAT. Harmon's first touchdown came on the opening kickoff, which he returned 94 yards. His second touchdown came in the second quarter on a 72-yard punt return in which he reportedly dodged and swerved from one side of the field to the other, running about 100 yards before reaching the end zone. His third touchdown was on an 85-yard run in the second quarter. During the third touchdown run, a spectator jumped from the stands and ran onto the field trying, without success, to tackle Harmon.

Michigan gained 295 rushing yards, held Cal to only eight rushing yards, and only allowed Cal to advance beyond midfield once, and then only in the fourth quarter when the Bears advanced to Michigan's 40-yard line. The margin of defeat was the worst for a Cal team since a 70–0 loss to USC in 1930. The Associated Press wrote that Harmon found California's defense "about as strong as a wet paper bag," noted that Harmon was "as hard to snare as a greased pig," and opined that the only reason Michigan's point total was not higher was that "Michigan's first-string players ran themselves into a complete state of exhaustion."

Michigan's starting lineup against California was Ed Frutig (left end), Albert Wistert (left tackle), Ralph Fritz (left guard), Robert Ingalls (center), Milo Sukup (right guard), Reuben Kelto (right tackle), Joe Rogers (right end), Forest Evashevski (quarterback), Harmon (left halfback), Norman Call (right halfback), and Bob Westfall (fullback).

=== Week 2: Michigan State ===
Week 2: Michigan State at Michigan

| Team | 1 | 2 | 3 | 4 | Total |
|---|---|---|---|---|---|
| Michigan State | 0 | 7 | 0 | 7 | 14 |
| • Michigan | 7 | 7 | 7 | 0 | 21 |

- Date: October 5, 1940
- Location: Michigan Stadium
  Ann Arbor, MI
- Game attendance: 69,951
- Referee: Lyle Clarno (Bradley)

On October 5, 1940, Michigan defeated Michigan State by a 21 to 14 score. The game was the 35th played between the two programs.

Tom Harmon scored all 21 points for Michigan on three touchdowns and three kicks for extra point. Michigan gained 312 rushing yards compared to 49 rushing yards for Michigan State. Both Michigan State touchdowns were scored by right halfback Walt Pawlowski.

Michigan's starting lineup against Michigan State was Joe Rogers (left end), Albert Wistert (left tackle), Ralph Fritz (left guard), Robert Ingalls (center), Milo Sukup (right guard), Reuben Kelto (right tackle), Ed Frutig (right end), Forest Evashevski (quarterback), Harmon (left halfback), David M. Nelson (right halfback), and Bob Westfall (fullback).

=== Week 3: at Harvard ===
Week 3: Michigan at Harvard

| Team | 1 | 2 | 3 | 4 | Total |
|---|---|---|---|---|---|
| • Michigan | 6 | 7 | 6 | 7 | 26 |
| Harvard | 0 | 0 | 0 | 0 | 0 |

- Date: October 12, 1940
- Location: Harvard Stadium
  Boston, MA
- Game attendance: 26,315
- Referee: P. N. Swaffield (Brown)

On October 12, 1940, Michigan defeated Harvard at Harvard Stadium by a score of 26–0. The game was the seventh played between the two programs, with Harvard having won four of the prior six games.

Tom Harmon scored three touchdowns and passed for a fourth to Paul Kromer. Harmon also kicked for two extra points. Michigan rushed for 204 yards as compared to 61 yards for Harvard. Michigan's starters played only two minutes of the second half and were then replaced by substitutes.

Michigan's starting lineup against Harvard was Joe Rogers (left end), Albert Wistert (left tackle), Ralph Fritz (left guard), Robert Ingalls (center), Milo Sukup (right guard), Reuben Kelto (right tackle), Ed Frutig (right end), Forest Evashevski (quarterback), Harmon (left halfback), David M. Nelson (right halfback), and Bob Westfall (fullback).

=== Week 4: Illinois ===
Week 4: Illinois at Michigan

| Team | 1 | 2 | 3 | 4 | Total |
|---|---|---|---|---|---|
| Illinois | 0 | 0 | 0 | 0 | 0 |
| • Michigan | 12 | 9 | 7 | 0 | 28 |

- Date: October 19, 1940
- Location: Michigan Stadium
  Ann Arbor, MI
- Game attendance: 39,975
- Referee: John S. Getchell (St. Thomas)

On October 19, 1940, Michigan defeated Illinois by a 28–0 score. The game was the 26th meeting between the two programs with the Illini having upset the Wolverines in 1939.

Michigan's scoring came on touchdowns by David M. Nelson, Tom Harmon, Ed Frutig and Bob Westfall. Harmon also threw a touchdown pass to Frutig and kicked both a field goal and a PAT. Michigan rushed for 240 yards, while Illinois was limited to 24 rushing yards. The game was attended by Michigan's Governor-elect Murray Van Wagoner and Franklin Delano Roosevelt, Jr., the President's son.

Michigan's starting lineup against Illinois was Joe Rogers (left end), Albert Wistert (left tackle), Ralph Fritz (left guard), Robert Ingalls (center), Milo Sukup (right guard), Reuben Kelto (right tackle), Frutig (right end), Forest Evashevski (quarterback), Harmon (left halfback), Nelson (right halfback), and Westfall (fullback).

=== Week 5: Penn ===
Week 5: Penn at Michigan

| Team | 1 | 2 | 3 | 4 | Total |
|---|---|---|---|---|---|
| Penn | 0 | 0 | 0 | 0 | 0 |
| • Michigan | 7 | 0 | 7 | 0 | 14 |

- Date: October 26, 1940
- Location: Michigan Stadium
  Ann Arbor, MI
- Game attendance: 62,262
- Referee: Mike Layden (Notre Dame)

On October 26, 1940, Michigan defeated Penn by a 14 to 0 score. The game was the 17th meeting between the two programs. It was a match between highly touted, undefeated teams. It matched two of the game's top coaches (Fritz Crisler and George Munger) and featured the nation's top two scorers in Tom Harmon of Michigan and Frank Reagan of Penn. The game drew noted broadcasters Ted Husing and Bill Stern in an event that was reportedly relayed by short wave "clear into war-torn Europe."

Harmon carried the ball 28 times for 142 net rushing yards and also handled the passing (8 of 12 for 51 yards) and punting for Michigan. He scored early in the game on a 19-yard run around the right end after a Penn fumble gave Michigan good field position. Harmon was responsible for Michigan's second touchdown in the third quarter, as he threw a touchdown pass to Ed Frutig, and also kicked for both extra points. Harmon reportedly played the second half with his shirt "half ripped off his back", and "gave the dogged Quaker defense a going over that will never be forgotten." Michigan senior guard Milo Sukup sustained a concussion in the game and, on medical advice, did not appear in another game.

Michigan's starting lineup against Penn was Joe Rogers (left end), Albert Wistert (left tackle), Ralph Fritz (left guard), Robert Ingalls (center), Milo Sukup (right guard), Reuben Kelto (right tackle), Frutig (right end), Forest Evashevski (quarterback), Harmon (left halfback), David M. Nelson (right halfback), and Bob Westfall (fullback). George Ceithaml replaced Evashevski at quarterback after the latter left the game with an injury.

=== Week 6: at Minnesota ===
Week 6: Michigan at Minnesota

| Team | 1 | 2 | 3 | 4 | Total |
|---|---|---|---|---|---|
| Michigan | 0 | 6 | 0 | 0 | 6 |
| • Minnesota | 0 | 7 | 0 | 0 | 7 |

- Date: November 9, 1940
- Location: Memorial Stadium
  Minneapolis, MN
- Game attendance: 63,894
- Referee: Frank Birch

On November 9, 1940, Michigan played its annual rivalry game with Minnesota. The game was the 31st between the programs, with Minnesota having won the previous six games under head coach Bernie Bierman. The 1940 game was played "in the mud and rain" at Memorial Stadium in Minneapolis. Both teams came into the game undefeated with Minnesota ranked #2 and Michigan ranked #3 in the AP Poll. The game was played before a crowd of 63,894 spectators, the largest crowd at a Minnesota home game to that point.

In the first quarter, Michigan drove to the Minnesota one-yard line, but Tom Harmon slipped on fourth down, and the ball went to Minnesota on downs. In the second quarter, Michigan took a 6–0 lead on a touchdown pass from Harmon to Forest Evashevski. Harmon missed "by inches" the kick for extra point. Later in the second quarter, Michigan's Ed Frutig blocked a Minnesota punt that was recovered by Michigan's Reuben Kelto at the Minnesota three-yard line. However, Harmon's pass into the end zone was intercepted, and Minnesota took over at the 20-yard line. On the next play from scrimmage, Minnesota scored on an 80-yard run by Bruce Smith. Joe Mernik kicked the extra point which was the difference in the game, Minnesota winning by a 7–6 score.

Michigan outgained Minnesota with 210 yards from scrimmage to 199 for Minnesota and also led with 15 first downs to five for the Gophers. The 1941 Michiganensian opined: "The Wolverines completely outplayed the Bierman charges with fifteen first downs to five . . . but it was to no avail, as Harmon, trying to dive forward with his famous cutback, was continually pulled down by old man mud. . . . Minnesota went on to win the National Championship, while Michigan finished third, but here in Ann Arbor, we'll always believe it was rain and not the Gophers which pushed Michigan out of what would have been its first national championship since 1932."

Michigan's starting lineup against Minnesota was Ed Frutig (left end), Albert Wistert (left tackle), Ralph Fritz (left guard), Robert Ingalls (center), Robert Kolesar (right guard), Reuben Kelto (right tackle), Joe Rogers (right end), Evashevski (quarterback), Harmon (left halfback), Harold Lockard (right halfback), and Bob Westfall (fullback).

=== Week 7: Northwestern ===
Week 7: Northwestern at Michigan

| Team | 1 | 2 | 3 | 4 | Total |
|---|---|---|---|---|---|
| Northwestern | 0 | 6 | 0 | 7 | 13 |
| • Michigan | 14 | 6 | 0 | 0 | 20 |

- Date: November 16, 1940
- Location: Michigan Stadium
  Ann Arbor, MI
- Game attendance: 75,099
- Referee: John S. Getchell (St. Thomas)

On November 16, 1940, Michigan defeated Northwestern by a 20–13 score. The game was the 15th between the two programs, with the previous four games resulting in three Northwestern victories and one tie.

Michigan's first touchdown was set up when end Ed Frutig blocked a punt out of bounds inside the Northwestern one-yard line. Tom Harmon then ran for the touchdown and kicked the PAT. On the ensuing drive, Northwestern was penalized 15 yards and forced to punt from its own end zone; Harold Lockard took the punt at the Northwestern 30-yard line and returned it 25 yards to the five-yard line. Harmon ran for five yards, and fullback Bob Westfall then ran for the touchdown. Harmon kicked the PAT, and Michigan led 14–0 at the end of the first quarter. On the first play of the second quarter, DeCorrrevont threw a touchdown pass to Motl for a 49-yard gain and a touchdown to narrow Michigan's lead to 14–7. As with Michigan's first two touchdowns, its third touchdown was set up by a muffed punt. On this occasion, a high punt was caught in a strong wind and went out of bounds at the Northwestern 26-yard line. Westfall scored his second touchdown, but Harmon missed the kick for PAT.

Michigan's starting lineup against Northwestern was Ed Frutig (left end), Albert Wistert (left tackle), Ralph Fritz (left guard), Robert Ingalls (center), Robert Kolesar (right guard), Reuben Kelto (right tackle), Joe Rogers (right end), Forest Evashevski (quarterback), Harmon (left halfback), Harold Lockard (right halfback), and Bob Westfall (fullback).

=== Week 8: at Ohio State ===
Week 8: Michigan at Ohio State

| Team | 1 | 2 | 3 | 4 | Total |
|---|---|---|---|---|---|
| • Michigan | 13 | 7 | 13 | 7 | 40 |
| Ohio State | 0 | 0 | 0 | 0 | 0 |

- Date: November 23, 1940
- Location: Ohio Stadium
  Columbus, OH
- Game attendance: 73,648
- Referee: James Masker (Northwestern)

On November 23, 1940, in the final game of the 1940 season, Michigan defeated Ohio State 40 to 0 in Columbus. The game was the 37th installment in the Michigan–Ohio State football rivalry. Ohio State had won four consecutive games under its head coach, Francis Schmidt, from 1934 to 1937, but Michigan had won the 1938 and 1939 matches.

Michigan's first touchdown came in the first quarter on a run by Tom Harmon and was followed a minute and 14 seconds later by a second Michigan touchdown as senior Paul Kromer, hobbled most of the season by leg injuries, returned a punt 80 yards. Playing in his final game for Michigan, Harmon ran for three touchdowns, threw two touchdown passes (one to Forest Evashevski and the other to Ed Frutig), and kicked four PATs. He also averaged 50 yards per punt on three punts. When Harmon left the field with 38 seconds remaining, the crowd game him a standing ovation. Harmon concluded his three years at Michigan with 33 touchdowns, surpassing the conference record set by Red Grange. Harmon gained 2,134 rushing yards on 398 carries for an average of 5.4 yards per carry. He also completed 101 of 233 passes for 1,399 yards, 16 touchdowns, and 10 interceptions.

Michigan gained 447 yards of total offense against Ohio State, 299 rushing and 148 passing. On defense, Michigan limited Ohio State to 82 rushing yards and 33 passing yards.

The margin of defeat was the worst suffered by an Ohio State team since 1902 when Michigan had defeated Ohio State by an 86 to 0 score. Despite having led the Buckeyes to a conference championship in 1939, the humiliating defeat to Michigan marked the end of Francis Schmidt's reign as Ohio State's head coach. After the season ended, Ohio State appointed a special committee "to investigate the 'football situation'", and, in the end, Schmidt and five of four assistant coaches were given a choice to "resign or be fired." They chose to resign.

Michigan's starting lineup against Ohio State was Frutig (left end), Wistert (left tackle), Fritz (left guard), Ingalls (center), Kolesar (right guard), Kelto (right tackle), Rogers (right end), Evashevski (quarterback), Harmon (left halfback), Call (right halfback), and Westfall (fullback).

== Players ==
=== Varsity letter winners ===
Twenty-five players from the 1940 Michigan team were awarded varsity letters, as listed below. Players who started at least half of the team's games are listed in bold.

- Jack W. Butler, Port Huron, Michigan - tackle
- Norman D. Call, Norwalk, Ohio - started 1 game at right halfback
- George Ceithaml, Chicago, Illinois - quarterback
- Edward W. Czak, Elyria, Ohio - end
- **Forest Evashevski**, Detroit, Michigan - started 8 games at quarterback
- Robert L. Flora, Muskegon, Michigan - tackle
- Harlin Fraumann, Pontiac, Michigan - end
- **Ralph Fritz**, New Kensington, Pennsylvania - started 6 games at left guard, 2 games at right guard
- **Ed Frutig**, River Rouge, Michigan - started 5 games at right end, 3 games at left end
- **Tom Harmon**, Gary, Indiana - started 7 games at left halfback, 1 game at right halfback
- **Robert Ingalls**, Marblehead, Massachusetts - started 7 games at center
- **Reuben Kelto**, Bessemer, Michigan - started 7 games at right guard
- Theodore Kennedy, Jr., Saginaw, Michigan - center
- Harry Kohl, Dayton, Ohio - halfback
- Robert Kolesar, Cleveland, Ohio - started 2 games at right guard, 1 game at left guard
- Bob Krejsa, Shaker Heights, Ohio - halfback
- Paul Kromer, Lorain, Ohio - started 1 game at left halfback, 1 game at right halfback
- Harold Lockard, Canton, Ohio - 2 games at right halfback
- William Melzow, Flint, Michigan - guard
- David M. Nelson, Detroit, Michigan - started 3 games at right halfback
- **Joe Rogers**, Royal Oak, Michigan - started 5 games at left end, 3 games at right end
- **Milo Sukup**, Muskegon Heights, Michigan - started 4 games at right guard, 1 game at left guard
- **Bob Westfall**, Ann Arbor, Michigan - started 8 games at fullback
- Clifford Wise - halfback
- **Albert Wistert**, Chicago, Illinois - started 7 games at left tackle

=== Non-varsity letter winners ===
- Harry F. Anderson, center, Chicago
- Leo P. Cunningham, guard, Revere, MA
- Frank S. Day, halfback, Detroit
- Paul H. Gannatal, halfback, Detroit
- James Grissen, fullback, Holland, MI
- Clarence S. Hall, end, Raynham, MA
- George H. Hildebrandt, guard, Hamburg, NY
- Archie Kodros, Alton, Illinois - started 1 game at center
- John T. Laine, guard, Puritan, MI
- Elmer Madar, halfback, Detroit, MI
- George S. Manalakas, halfback, Detroit, MI
- Michael Megregian, quarterback, Detroit
- Roland Savilla, Gallagher, West Virginia - started 1 game at left tackle
- Rudolph J. Sengel, tackle, Louisville, KY
- Phillip E. Sharpe, end, Lakewood, OH
- Rudy Smeja, end, Chicago
- William Smith - started 1 game at right tackle
- Robert B. Smith, tackle, Riverside, CA
- Marshall C. Strenger, Lake Forest, IL
- Louis K. Woytek, center, Johnson City, NY
- Robert Zimmerman, fullback, Chicago

=== Scoring leaders ===
| Player | Touchdowns | Extra points | Field goals | Total Points |
|---|---|---|---|---|
| Tom Harmon | 16 | 18 | 1 | 117 |
| Bob Westfall | 3 | 0 | 0 | 18 |
| Ed Frutig | 3 | 0 | 0 | 18 |
| Forest Evashevski | 2 | 0 | 0 | 12 |
| Paul Kromer | 2 | 0 | 0 | 12 |
| David M. Nelson | 2 | 0 | 0 | 12 |
| Clifford Wise | 1 | 0 | 0 | 6 |
| William Melzow | 0 | 1 | 0 | 1 |
| **Totals** | **29** | **19** | **1** | **196** |

=== Awards and honors ===
==== Tom Harmon awards and honors ====
At the end of the 1940 season, Michigan's Tom Harmon won numerous awards, including the following:

- On November 25, 1940, the Maxwell Memorial Club announced that Harmon had been chosen as the winner of the Maxwell Award as "the nation's No. 1 football player for 1940."
- On November 28, 1940, Harmon was announced as the winner of the Heisman Trophy as the country's outstanding college football player with a record count of 1,303 votes.
- On December 10, 1940, Harmon was named the male athlete of the year across all sports in annual polling of sports experts conducted by the Associated Press. Harmon received 147 points in the poll, nearly tripling the points received by runner-up Hank Greenberg.
- Harmon was also a unanimous All-American, receiving first-team honors from the All-America Board, the Associated Press, Collier's Weekly, the International News Service, Liberty magazine, the Newspaper Enterprise Association, Newsweek, the Sporting News, and the United Press.
- In mid-December 1940, Harmon was unanimously selected as the most valuable player in the Big Ten Conference.
- Harmon and backfield teammate Forest Evashevski, described as Michigan's "two-man gang," were both selected by conference coaches for the third consecutive year as first-team players on the Associated Press All-Big Ten Conference team.

==== All-American and All-Big 10 honors ====
In addition to Harmon, two other Michigan players received first- or second-team All-America honors. They are Ed Frutig, who was selected as a first-team end by the International News Service and Liberty magazine, and Forest Evashevski, who was selected as a second-team quarterback by Football Digest.

Several Michigan players were also selected to the 1940 All-Big Ten Conference football team. They are: Forest Evashevski (AP-1; UP-2), Ed Frutig (AP-1; UP-1), Ralph Fritz (AP-1; UP-1), Tom Harmon (AP-1; UP-1), Al Wistert (AP-2), and Bob Westfall (UP-2)

==== Post-season all-star and team honors ====
Several Michigan players were also selected to play in post-season all-star game. Tom Harmon, Ed Frutig and Forest Evashevski were selected to play in the East–West Shrine Game on New Year's Day in San Francisco, while Ralph Fritz was a starter at guard for the north team in the Blue–Gray Football Classic in Montgomery, Alabama. The Michigan players accounted for both of the East's touchdowns in the Shrine Game, as Harmon threw touchdown passes to Evashevski and Frutig, the latter coming on a fake punt by Harmon.

Team awards went to Tom Harmon as the team's Most Valuable Player, and to George Ceithaml as the recipient of the Meyer Morton Award.

=== NFL draft ===
The following players were claimed in the 1941 NFL draft.

| Player | Position | Round | Pick | NFL club |
|---|---|---|---|---|
| Tom Harmon | Halfback | 1 | 1 | Chicago Bears |
| Forest Evashevski | Quarterback | 1 | 10 | Washington Redskins |
| Ed Frutig | End | 5 | 37 | Green Bay Packers |
| Ralph Fritz | Guard | 10 | 82 | Pittsburgh Steelers |

== Coaching and training staff ==
- Head coach: Fritz Crisler
- Assistant coaches: Archie Kodros, Earl Martineau, Ernest McCoy, Biggie Munn, Bennie Oosterbaan, Hercules Renda, Wally Weber
- Trainer: Ray Roberts
- Manager: Howarth
