= 1940 All-Eastern football team =

American all-star college football team

The 1940 All-Eastern football team consists of American football players chosen by various selectors as the best players at each position among the Eastern colleges and universities during the 1940 college football season.

== All-Eastern selections ==
=== Backs ===
- Walter Matuszczak, Cornell (AP-1)
- Frank Reagan, Penn (AP-1)
- Charlie O'Rourke, Boston College (AP-1)
- George Kracum, Pittsburgh (AP-1)
- Henry Toczylowski, Boston College (AP-2)
- Andy Tomasic, Temple (AP-2)
- Dave Allerdice, Princeton (AP-2)
- Steve Filipowicz, Fordham (AP-2)

=== Ends ===
- Loren MacKinney, Harvard (AP-1)
- Alan Bartholomy, Yale (AP-1)
- Hugh Barber, Columbia (AP-2)
- Alva Kelley, Cornell (AP-2)

=== Tackles ===
- Nick Drahos, Cornell (AP-1)
- Joe Ungerer, Fordham (AP-1)
- Gene Flathmann, Navy (AP-2)
- Bill Collins, Lafayette (AP-2)

=== Guards ===
- George Kerr, Boston College (AP-1)
- Agostino Lio, Georgetown (AP-1)
- Lou Young, Dartmouth (AP-2)
- Joe Weidner, Army (AP-2)

=== Centers ===
- Chet Gladchuk, Boston College (AP-1)
- Leon Gajecki, Penn State (AP-2)

== Key ==
- AP = Associated Press
- UP = United Press
- INS = International News Service
- NEA = Newspaper Enterprise Association

== See also ==
- 1940 College Football All-America Team
