= Garry White =

Garry White may refer to:

- Garry Michael White, American playwright and screenwriter
- Garry White (American football), on List of Minnesota Golden Gophers in the NFL draft
- Garry White (musician) in Homelands (festival)

== See also ==
- Gary White (disambiguation)
