= 1940 Purdue Boilermakers football team =

American college football season

1940 Purdue Boilermakers football
- Conference: Big Ten Conference
- Record: 2–6 (1–4 Big Ten)
- Head coach: Mal Elward (4th season)
- MVP: David Rankin
- Captain: David Rankin
- Home stadium: Ross–Ade Stadium

1940 Big Ten Conference football standings
	Conf.					Overall
Team	W		L		T	W		L		T
No. 1 Minnesota $	6	–	0	–	0	8	–	0	–	0
No. 3 Michigan	3	–	1	–	0	7	–	1	–	0
No. 8 Northwestern	4	–	2	–	0	6	–	2	–	0
Ohio State	3	–	3	–	0	4	–	4	–	0
Wisconsin	3	–	3	–	0	4	–	4	–	0
Iowa	2	–	3	–	0	4	–	4	–	0
Indiana	2	–	3	–	0	3	–	5	–	0
Purdue	1	–	4	–	0	2	–	6	–	0
Illinois	0	–	5	–	0	1	–	7	–	0
$ – Conference champion; Rankings from AP Poll

The 1940 Purdue Boilermakers football team was an American football team that represented Purdue University during the 1940 Big Ten Conference football season. In their fourth season under head coach Mal Elward, the Boilermakers compiled a 2–6 record (1–4 record against conference opponents), finished in eighth place in the Big Ten Conference, and were outscored by opponents by a total of 106 to 96.

Purdue was ranked at No. 29 (out of 697 college football teams) in the final rankings under the Litkenhous Difference by Score system for 1940.

== Schedule ==
Date	Opponent	Site	Result	Attendance	Source
September 28	Butler*	Ross–Ade Stadium; West Lafayette, IN	W 28–0	17,500	
October 5	at Ohio State	Ohio Stadium; Columbus, OH	L 14–17	54,556	
October 12	at Michigan State*	Macklin Field; East Lansing, MI	L 7–20	16,500	
October 26	Wisconsin^{†}	Ross–Ade Stadium; West Lafayette, IN	L 13–14	22,000	
November 2	at Iowa	Iowa Stadium; Iowa City, IA	W 21–6	40,000	
November 9	at No. 17 Fordham*	Polo Grounds; New York, NY	L 7–13	28,576	
November 16	at No. 1 Minnesota	Memorial Stadium; Minneapolis, MN	L 6–33	30,163	
November 23	Indiana	Ross–Ade Stadium; West Lafayette, IN (Old Oaken Bucket)	L 0–3	30,000	
*Non-conference game; ^{†}Homecoming; Rankings from AP Poll released prior to the game

== Roster ==
- Paul Anderson, HB
- Ted Axton, C
- Anthony Berto, HB
- Bryan Brock, HB
- Bill Buffington, FB
- Mike Byelene, HB
- Marion Carter, HB
- Bill Combs, E
- Walter Cook, HB
- Keith Correll, QB
- George Doherty, C
- John Galvin, HB
- James Henderson, G
- Bob Kersey, QB-E
- LaVern King, E
- Alex Leugo, C
- Bill Lindsay, QB
- Forrest McCaffry, E
- Gene McIlwain, HB
- Tom Melton, G
- Jim Miller, G
- William Neff, T
- John Petty, FB
- David Rankin, E
- Al Rossi, T
- Italo Rossi, T
- Jim Rush, E
- Hal Schumacher, FB
- Bill Shimer, E
- Fred Smerke, QB-E
- V. A. Snyder, FB
- Wes Stevens, E-G
- John Thursby, E
- Herman Timperman, T
- Ted Tycocki, E-HB
- Bruce Warren, T
- Jack Winchell, G
