= 1940 Indiana Hoosiers football team =

American college football season

1940 Indiana Hoosiers football
- Conference: Big Ten Conference
- Record: 3–5 (2–3 Big-10)
- Head coach: Bo McMillin (7th season)
- MVP: Dwight Gahm
- Captain: William Smith
- Home stadium: Memorial Stadium

1940 Big Ten Conference football standings
	Conf.					Overall
Team	W		L		T	W		L		T
No. 1 Minnesota $	6	–	0	–	0	8	–	0	–	0
No. 3 Michigan	3	–	1	–	0	7	–	1	–	0
No. 8 Northwestern	4	–	2	–	0	6	–	2	–	0
Ohio State	3	–	3	–	0	4	–	4	–	0
Wisconsin	3	–	3	–	0	4	–	4	–	0
Iowa	2	–	3	–	0	4	–	4	–	0
Indiana	2	–	3	–	0	3	–	5	–	0
Purdue	1	–	4	–	0	2	–	6	–	0
Illinois	0	–	5	–	0	1	–	7	–	0
$ – Conference champion; Rankings from AP Poll

The 1940 Indiana Hoosiers football team represented the Indiana Hoosiers in the 1940 Big Ten Conference football season. The participated as members of the Big Ten Conference. The Hoosiers played their home games at Memorial Stadium in Bloomington, Indiana. The team was coached by Bo McMillin, in his seventh year as head coach of the Hoosiers.

Indiana was ranked at No. 26 (out of 697 college football teams) in the final rankings under the Litkenhous Difference by Score system for 1940.

== Schedule ==
Date	Opponent	Site	Result	Attendance	Source
October 5	Texas*	Memorial Stadium; Bloomington, IN	L 6–13	17,000	
October 12	at Nebraska*	Memorial Stadium; Lincoln, NE	L 7–13	41,000	
October 19	No. 20 Iowa	Memorial Stadium; Bloomington, IN	W 10–6		
October 26	at No. 7 Northwestern	Dyche Stadium; Evanston, IL	L 7–20	40,000	
November 2	at Ohio State	Ohio Stadium; Columbus, OH	L 6–21	56,667	
November 9	Michigan State*	Memorial Stadium; Bloomington, IN (rivalry)	W 20–0		
November 16	at Wisconsin	Camp Randall Stadium; Madison, WI	L 10–27		
November 23	at Purdue	Ross–Ade Stadium; West Lafayette, IN (Old Oaken Bucket)	W 3–0	30,000	
*Non-conference game; Rankings from AP Poll released prior to the game

== 1941 NFL draftees ==
Player	Position	Round	Pick	NFL club
Eddie Rucinski	End	6	49	Brooklyn Dodgers
Emil Uremovich	Tackle	11	93	Pittsburgh Steelers
Harold Hursh	Back	19	174	Cleveland Rams
