= Don Nolander =

American football player (1921–1999)

No. 20
- Position: Center

Personal information
- Born: September 14, 1921; Minneapolis, Minnesota, U.S.
- Died: April 24, 1999 (aged 77); Bonita Springs, Florida, U.S.
- Listed height: 6 ft 1 in (1.85 m)
- Listed weight: 210 lb (95 kg)

Career information
- High school: Roosevelt (Minneapolis)
- College: Minnesota
- NFL draft: 1945: 32nd round, 325 (By the Washington Redskins)th overall pick

Career history
- Los Angeles Dons (1946)

Awards and highlights
- 2× National champion (1940, 1941)

Career AAFC statistics
- Games played: 11
- Games started: 7
- Interceptions: 1
- Stats at Pro Football Reference

Donald Austin Nolander (September 14, 1921 – April 24, 1999) was an American professional football center in the All-America Football Conference (AAFC) for the Los Angeles Dons. He played college football at the University of Minnesota and was selected in the 32nd round of the 1945 NFL draft by the Washington Redskins.

== Early life ==
Nolander was born to Austin Nolander and Anna Hermauer on September 14, 1921, in Minneapolis, Minnesota. He graduated from Roosevelt High School and the University of Minnesota. During World War II, Nolander served in the US Navy.

== Drafted by the Redskins but turns to the AAFC ==
In 1945, Nolander was selected 325th overall in the 32nd round of the NFL Draft by the Washington Redskins. However, Nolander never ended up playing for the Redskins franchise.

Instead, the very next year, Nolander joined the roster of the Los Angeles Dons in the newly formed All-America Football Conference (AAFC). The AAFC was a rival league to the NFL that existed from 1946 to 1949. There, Nolander found a home as the Dons' starting center.

== Years with the Los Angeles Dons ==
Nolander became a standout player for the Dons upon joining the AAFC in 1946. His athleticism anchored the Los Angeles offensive line. In 1947, Nolander started all 14 games for the Dons and was named First-team All-AAFC. Nolander paved the way for over 3,500 passing yards against Dons. The 1948 season brought similar success, as Nolander earned First-team All-AAFC honors for the second consecutive year. He also handled punting duties for the Dons in 1948 season.

== Post-Football life ==
After four strong years playing for the Dons from 1946 to 1949, Nolander retired from professional football. He did not find further opportunities after the AAFC merged with the NFL in 1950. Nolander returned to Minnesota, where he lived for the rest of his life. He worked various jobs outside of football, including as a salesman.

== Personal life and death ==
In 1945, Nolander married Patricia Sharpe. He had a daughter and three sons. Nolander died on April 24, 1999, at the age of 77, in Bonita Springs, Florida. His funeral was held on April 28.

== Nolander's legacy and significance ==
Nolander was a key contributor that helped the Los Angeles Dons achieve success in 1940s.

As a two-time First-Team All-AAFC selection, Nolander was recognized one of the standout players of the AAFC years. He contributed to the league's wide-open, pass-heavy style of play.
