= Gary White =

Gary White may refer to:

- Gary White (athlete) (born 1985), English athlete
- Gary White (baseball) (born 1967), Australian baseball player
- Gary White (engineer), 2011 Time 100 selection
- Gary White (footballer) (born 1974), English football coach and former player
- Gary White (politician), member of the Kansas House of Representatives
- Gary D. White, American football coach

== See also ==
- Gareth White (born 1979), English cricketer
- Garry White (disambiguation)
