= 1940 Northwestern Wildcats football team =

American college football season

1940 Northwestern Wildcats football
- Conference: Big Ten Conference

Ranking
- AP: No. 8
- Record: 6–2 (4–2 Big Ten)
- Head coach: Pappy Waldorf (6th season)
- Offensive scheme: Single-wing
- MVP: Paul Hiemenz
- Captain: Dick Richards
- Home stadium: Dyche Stadium

1940 Big Ten Conference football standings
	Conf.					Overall
Team	W		L		T	W		L		T
No. 1 Minnesota $	6	–	0	–	0	8	–	0	–	0
No. 3 Michigan	3	–	1	–	0	7	–	1	–	0
No. 8 Northwestern	4	–	2	–	0	6	–	2	–	0
Ohio State	3	–	3	–	0	4	–	4	–	0
Wisconsin	3	–	3	–	0	4	–	4	–	0
Iowa	2	–	3	–	0	4	–	4	–	0
Indiana	2	–	3	–	0	3	–	5	–	0
Purdue	1	–	4	–	0	2	–	6	–	0
Illinois	0	–	5	–	0	1	–	7	–	0
$ – Conference champion; Rankings from AP Poll

The 1940 Northwestern Wildcats team was an American football team that represented Northwestern University during the 1940 Big Ten Conference football season. In their sixth year under head coach Pappy Waldorf, the Wildcats compiled a 6–2 record (4–2 against Big Ten Conference opponents), finished in third place in the Big Ten Conference, and were ranked No. 8 in the final AP Poll. Their only losses came against No. 1 Minnesota and No. 3 Michigan.

Northwestern was ranked at No. 4 (out of 697 college football teams) in the final rankings under the Litkenhous Difference by Score system for 1940.

They played their home games at Dyche Stadium in Evanston, Illinois.

== Schedule ==
Date	Opponent	Rank	Site	Result	Attendance	Source
October 5	at Syracuse*		Archbold Stadium; Syracuse, NY	W 40–0	22,000	
October 12	Ohio State		Dyche Stadium; Evanston, IL	W 6–3	42,000	
October 19	at Wisconsin	No. 4	Camp Randall Stadium; Madison, WI	W 27–7	25,000	
October 26	Indiana	No. 7	Dyche Stadium; Evanston, IL	W 20–7	40,000	
November 2	No. 4 Minnesota	No. 8	Dyche Stadium; Evanston, IL	L 12–13	48,000	
November 9	Illinois	No. 10	Dyche Stadium; Evanston, IL (rivalry)	W 32–14	35,000	
November 16	at No. 6 Michigan	No. 10	Michigan Stadium; Ann Arbor, MI (rivalry)	L 13–20	76,749	
November 23	No. 14 Notre Dame*	No. 10	Dyche Stadium; Evanston, IL (rivalry)	W 20–0	48,000	
*Non-conference game; Rankings from AP Poll released prior to the game

== Rankings ==
Ranking movements Legend: ██ Increase in ranking ██ Decrease in ranking ( ) = First-place votes
	Week							
Poll	1	2	3	4	5	6	7	Final
AP	4 (1)	7	8 (1)	10	10	10	7	8

== Players ==
- Alf Bauman – tackle (consensus 1st-team All-American; 1st-team All-Big Ten selection by AP and UP)
- Ollie Hahnenstein – halfback (2nd-team All-Big Ten selection by AP and UP)
- Paul Hiemenz – center (1st-team All-Big Ten selection by AP and UP)
- Joe Lokane – guard (1st-team All-Big Ten selection by AP and UP)
