= 1940 Iowa Hawkeyes football team =

American college football season

1940 Iowa Hawkeyes football
- Conference: Big Ten Conference
- Record: 4–4 (2–3 Big Ten)
- Head coach: Eddie Anderson (2nd season)
- MVP: Mike Enich
- Captain: Mike Enich
- Home stadium: Iowa Stadium

1940 Big Ten Conference football standings
	Conf.					Overall
Team	W		L		T	W		L		T
No. 1 Minnesota $	6	–	0	–	0	8	–	0	–	0
No. 3 Michigan	3	–	1	–	0	7	–	1	–	0
No. 8 Northwestern	4	–	2	–	0	6	–	2	–	0
Ohio State	3	–	3	–	0	4	–	4	–	0
Wisconsin	3	–	3	–	0	4	–	4	–	0
Iowa	2	–	3	–	0	4	–	4	–	0
Indiana	2	–	3	–	0	3	–	5	–	0
Purdue	1	–	4	–	0	2	–	6	–	0
Illinois	0	–	5	–	0	1	–	7	–	0
$ – Conference champion; Rankings from AP Poll

The 1940 Iowa Hawkeyes football team was an American football team that represented the University of Iowa as a member of the Big Ten Conference during the 1940 Big Ten football season. In their second year under head coach Eddie Anderson, the Hawkeyes compiled a 4–4 record (2–3 in conference games), tied for sixth place in the Big Ten, and outscored opponents by a total of 125 to 98. Iowa was ranked No. 25 (out of 697 college football teams) in the final Litkenhous Ratings released in December 1940.

Tackle Mike Enich was the team captain and was also selected as the team's most valuable player.

The team played its home games at Iowa Stadium (later renamed Kinnick Stadium) in Iowa City, Iowa.

== Schedule ==
Date	Opponent	Rank	Site	Result	Attendance	Source
October 5	South Dakota*		Iowa Stadium; Iowa City, IA	W 46–0		
October 12	Wisconsin		Iowa Stadium; Iowa City, IA (rivalry)	W 30–12		
October 19	at Indiana	No. 20	Memorial Stadium; Bloomington, IA	L 6–10		
October 26	at No. 6 Minnesota		Memorial Stadium; Minneapolis, MN (rivalry)	L 6–34	62,992	
November 2	Purdue^{†}		Iowa Stadium; Iowa City, IA	L 6–21	40,000	
November 9	at No. 12 Nebraska*		Memorial Stadium; Lincoln, NE (rivalry)	L 6–14		
November 16	at No. 7 Notre Dame*		Notre Dame Stadium; Notre Dame, IN	W 7–0	45,960	
November 23	Illinois		Iowa Stadium; Iowa City, IA	W 18–7	19,759	
*Non-conference game; ^{†}Homecoming; Rankings from AP Poll released prior to the game

== Rankings ==
Ranking movements Legend: ██ Increase in ranking ██ Decrease in ranking — = Not ranked
	Week							
Poll	1	2	3	4	5	6	7	Final
AP	20	—	—	—	—	—	—	—
