= Joe Ungerer =

American football player (1916–1990)

No. 46
- Position: Tackle

Personal information
- Born: December 10, 1916; Bethlehem, Pennsylvania, U.S.
- Died: July 15, 1990 (aged 73); Absecon, New Jersey, U.S.
- Listed height: 6 ft 0 in (1.83 m)
- Listed weight: 243 lb (110 kg)

Career information
- High school: Liberty (Bethlehem)
- College: Fordham (1937-1940)
- NFL draft: 1941: 20th round, 189th overall pick

Career history
- Washington Redskins (1944–1945)

Awards and highlights
- Third-team All-American (1940); First-team All-Eastern (1940)

Career NFL statistics
- Games played: 15
- Games started: 7
- Stats at Pro Football Reference

Joseph C. Ungerer (December 10, 1916 – July 15, 1990) was an American professional football tackle in the National Football League (NFL) for the Washington Redskins. He played college football at Fordham University and was drafted in the 20th round of the 1941 NFL draft by the Brooklyn Dodgers.
