= Leon Gajecki =

American football player (1917–2000)

- Gajecki in 1940

Profile
- Position: Center

Personal information
- Born: December 10, 1917; Colver, Pennsylvania, U.S.
- Died: November 2, 2000 (aged 82); Woodbury, New Jersey, U.S.

Career information
- College: Penn State

Awards and highlights
- First-team All-American (1940); Second-team All-Eastern (1940)

Leon J. Gajecki (December 10, 1917 – November 2, 2000) was an American football player.

Gajecki was born in 1917 in Colver, Pennsylvania, and attended Ebensburg High School.

He played college football for the Penn State Nittany Lions football team from 1937 to 1940. He was selected by both the Newspaper Enterprise Association and Liberty magazine as a first-team center on the 1940 All-America college football team.

Gajecki was drafted by the Pittsburgh Steelers with the 142nd pick in the 1940 NFL draft. He played for the Jersey City Giants of the American Football League from 1946 to 1948.

After retiring from football, he settled in Pitman, New Jersey. He coached the football team at Glassboro State College in the mid-1960s. He also worked as a fuel technologist for more than 30 years for Exxon. He was inducted into the Cambria County Sports Hall of Fame in 1971. He died in 2000 at age 82 at the Greenbriar West Nursing Home in Woodbury, New Jersey.
