= Chet Gladchuk =

American football player (1917–1967)

No. 11, 51, 77
- Positions: Center, guard, tackle

Personal information
- Born: April 4, 1917; Bridgeport, Connecticut, U.S.
- Died: September 4, 1967 (aged 50); Northampton, Massachusetts, U.S.
- Listed height: 6 ft 4 in (1.93 m)
- Listed weight: 248 lb (112 kg)

Career information
- High school: Warren Harding (Bridgeport)
- College: Boston College
- NFL draft: 1941: 2nd round, 12th overall pick

Career history
- New York Giants (1941, 1946–1947); Montreal Alouettes (1949)

Awards and highlights
- Grey Cup champion (1949); First-team All-American (1940); First-team All-Eastern (1940)

Career NFL statistics
- Games played: 28
- Games started: 19
- Fumble recoveries: 1
- Stats at Pro Football Reference
- College Football Hall of Fame

Chester Stephen Gladchuk Sr. (April 4, 1917 – September 4, 1967) was an American professional football player who was a center for the New York Giants of the National Football League (NFL). He played college football for the Boston College Eagles, earning first-team All-American from the Associated Press in 1940. He was selected 12th overall by the Pittsburgh Steelers in the second round of the 1941 NFL draft. After playing seven seasons for the New York Giants and after taking a season off, Gladchuk joined the Montreal Alouettes of the Canadian Football League in 1949, played a full 12-game season, and helped win the Larks first Grey Cup. Gladchuk was elected to the College Football Hall of Fame in 1975.
