= Bob Bjorklund =

American football player (1918–1994)

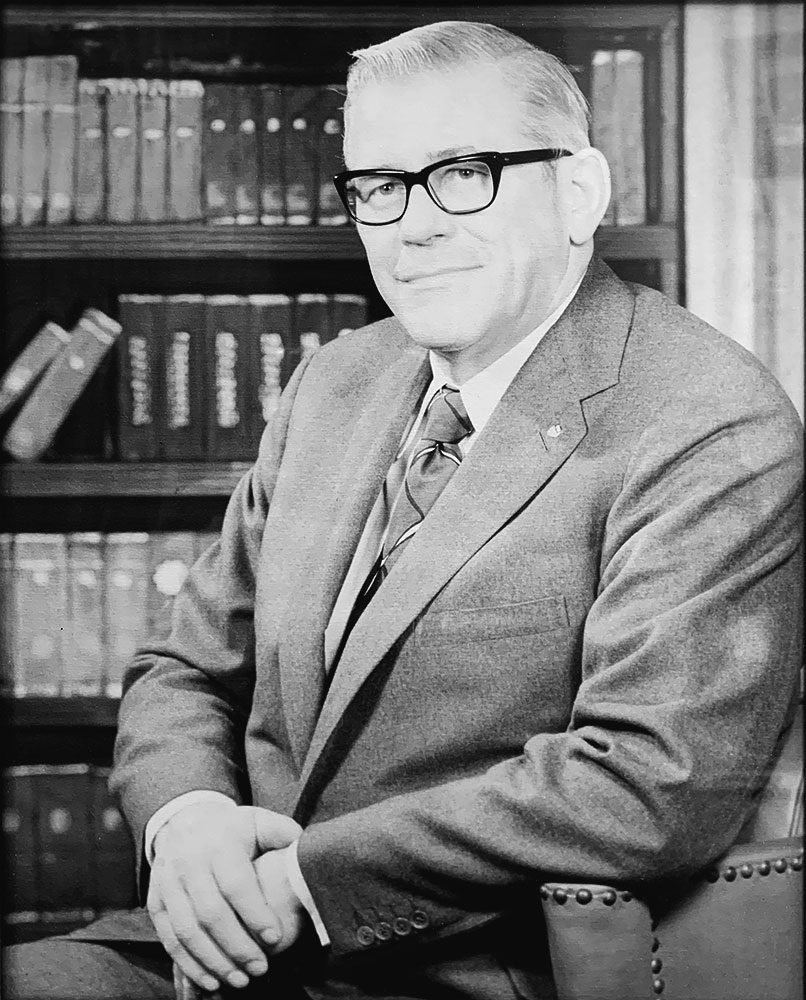

No. 50
- Positions: Center, linebacker, end

Personal information
- Born: June 12, 1918; Minneapolis, Minnesota, U.S.
- Died: January 27, 1994 (aged 75); Hopkins, Minnesota, U.S.
- Listed height: 6 ft 2 in (1.88 m)
- Listed weight: 225 lb (102 kg)

Career information
- High school: North (Minneapolis)
- College: Minnesota (1937–1940)
- NFL draft: 1941: 20th round, 182nd overall pick

Career history

Playing
- Philadelphia Eagles (1941)

Coaching
- Fort Douglas (1943) Head coach

Awards and highlights
- National champion (1940)

Career NFL statistics
- Games played: 7
- Stats at Pro Football Reference

Head coaching record
- Career: 4–2–1 (.643)

Robert John Bjorklund (June 12, 1918 – January 27, 1994) was an American professional football player who was a center for one season with the Philadelphia Eagles of the National Football League (NFL). He was selected by the Pittsburgh Steelers in the 20th round of the 1941 NFL draft after playing college football at the University of Minnesota.

== Early life and college ==
Robert John Bjorklund was born on June 12, 1918, in Minneapolis, Minnesota. He attended North Community High School in Minneapolis, Minnesota.

He was a member of the Minnesota Golden Gophers of the University of Minnesota from 1937 to 1940, and a three-year letterman from 1938 to 1940. 1940 Golden Gophers were AP Poll national champions.

== Professional career ==
Bjorklund was selected by the Pittsburgh Steelers in the 20th round, with the 182nd overall pick, of the 1941 NFL draft. He signed with the Philadelphia Eagles later in 1941. He played in seven games for the Eagles during the 1942 season. He became a free agent after the season. Bjorklund served in the United States Army during World War II. He was a member of the 1944 Camp Peary Pirates football team.

== Post-playing career ==
Bjorklund was the head coach of the 1943 Fort Douglas GIs football team. He died on January 27, 1994, in Hopkins, Minnesota.

== Head coaching record ==
Year	Team	Overall	Conference	Standing	Bowl/playoffs
Fort Douglas GIs (Independent) (1943)
1943	Fort Douglas	4–2–1			
Fort Douglas:		4–2–1			
Total:		4–2–1			
