= Helge Pukema =

American football player (1917–2004)

Profile
- Position: Guard

Personal information
- Born: April 8, 1917; Bessemer, Michigan, U.S.
- Died: December 20, 2004 (aged 87); Billings Park, Wisconsin, U.S.

Career information
- College: Minnesota

Awards and highlights
- 2× National champion (1940, 1941); First-team All-American (1940); Second-team All-Big Ten (1941)

Helge Emil Pukema (April 8, 1917 – December 20, 2004) was an American football player. He played college football for the Minnesota Golden Gophers football team and was selected by the Newspaper Enterprise Association (NEA) as a first-team guard on the 1940 College Football All-America Team. He died in Billings Park, Wisconsin, in 2004 at age 87.

== Head coaching record ==
Year	Team	Overall	Conference	Standing	Bowl/playoffs
St. Olaf Oles (Minnesota Intercollegiate Athletic Conference) (1949–1950)
1949	St. Olaf	5–4	2–4	7th	
1950	St. Olaf	2–6	2–4	T–7th	
St. Olaf:		7–10	4–8		
Total:		7–10			
