= Bill Kuusisto =

American football player (1918–1973)

No. 52, 45
- Position: Guard

Personal information
- Born: April 26, 1918; Herman, Michigan, U.S.
- Died: May 28, 1973 (aged 55); Paynesville, Minnesota, U.S.
- Listed height: 6 ft 0 in (1.83 m)
- Listed weight: 228 lb (103 kg)

Career information
- High school: Roosevelt (Minneapolis, Minnesota)
- College: Minnesota
- NFL draft: 1941: 8th round, 66th overall pick

Career history
- Green Bay Packers (1941–1946)

Awards and highlights
- NFL champion (1944); National champion (1940); Second-team All-Big Ten (1940)

Career NFL statistics
- Games played: 54
- Games started: 25
- Stats at Pro Football Reference

William E. Kuusisto (April 26, 1918 – May 28, 1973) was a guard in the National Football League (NFL) who played for the Green Bay Packers. Kuusisto played collegiate ball for the University of Minnesota and the University of Wisconsin before being drafted by the Green Bay Packers in the eighth round of the 1941 NFL draft. He played professionally for six seasons and retired in 1946. Kuusisto was also a professional wrestler.

== Early life and education ==
Kuusisto was born on April 26, 1918 in Herman, Michigan and attended Roosevelt High School in Virginia, Minnesota. He then played collegiate ball for the University of Minnesota and the University of Wisconsin.

== Football career ==
Kuusisto was drafted by the Green Bay Packers in the eighth round of the 1941 NFL draft. He won the 1944 NFL Championship with the Packers. He continued to play for the Packers until he retired in 1946.

== Wrestling career ==
Kuusisto was also a professional wrestler.

== Later life and death ==
Kuusisto died of a heart attack in Paynesville, Minnesota on May 28, 1973, at the age of 55.
