= Mal Elward =

American athletics administrator (1892–1982)

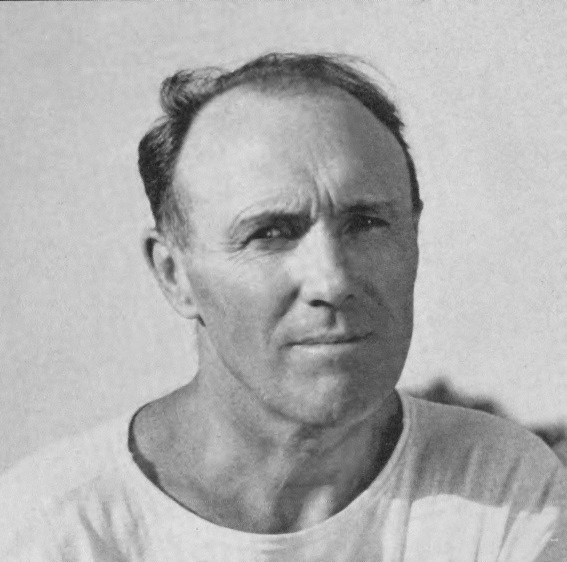
- Elward pictured in Debris 1939, Purdue yearbook

Biographical details
- Born: June 23, 1892; Rexton, New Brunswick, Canada
- Died: December 31, 1982 (aged 90); Stanford, California, U.S.

Playing career

Football
- 1912–1915: Notre Dame
- Position: End

Coaching career (HC unless noted)

Football
- 1922–1923: Grinnell
- 1924–1926: John Carroll
- 1927–1936: Purdue (assistant)
- 1937–1941: Purdue
- 1942–1943: Lakehurst NAS
- 1946–1956: Stanford (assistant)

Basketball
- 1922–1923: Grinnell
- 1924–1927: John Carroll

Administrative career (AD unless noted)
- 1941: Purdue

Head coaching record
- Overall: 38–50–9 (football); 22–24 (basketball)

Allen Henry "Mal" Elward (June 23, 1892 – December 31, 1982) was an American football player, coach of football and basketball, and college athletics administrator. He served as the head football coach at Grinnell College from 1922 to 1923, John Carroll University from 1924 to 1926, and Purdue University from 1937 to 1941. Elward was also the head basketball coach at John Carroll from 1924 to 1927, tallying a mark of 22–24 He was the athletic director at Purdue in 1941. Elward played football as an end at the University of Notre Dame from 1912 to 1915. He served as an assistant football coach at Purdue from 1927 to 1936 and at Stanford University from 1946 to 1956. During World War II, Elward was the head coach of the Lakehurst Naval Air Station Blimps football team in 1942 and 1943.

Elward served as a pilot in the United States Navy during World War I under Richard E. Byrd. In World War II, he was a naval aviation officer, reaching the rank of lieutenant commander. Elward died on December 31, 1982, at Stanford University Hospital in Stanford, California.

== Head coaching record ==
=== Football ===
Year	Team	Overall	Conference	Standing
Grinnell Pioneers (Missouri Valley Intercollegiate Athletic Association) (1922–1923)
1922	Grinnell	3–5	1–3	7th
1923	Grinnell	2–6	1–3	8th
Grinnell:		5–11	2–6	
John Carroll Blue Streaks (Independent) (1924–1926)
1924	John Carroll	7–2		
1925	John Carroll	2–6–1		
1926	John Carroll	2–5–1		
John Carroll:		11–13–2		
Purdue Boilermakers (Big Ten Conference) (1937–1941)
1937	Purdue	4–3–1	2–2–1	T–4th
1938	Purdue	5–1–2	3–1–1	T–2nd
1939	Purdue	3–3–2	2–1–2	T–3rd
1940	Purdue	2–6	1–4	8th
1941	Purdue	2–5–1	1–4	T–7th
Purdue:		16–18–6	9–12–4	
Lakehurst Naval Air Station Blimps (Independent) (1942–1943)
1942	Lakehurst NAS	4–4–1		
1943	Lakehurst NAS	2–4		
Lakehurst NAS:		6–8–1		
Total:		38–50–9		
