= 1940 Ohio State Buckeyes football team =

American college football season

1940 Ohio State Buckeyes football
- Conference: Big Ten Conference
- Record: 4–4 (3–3 Big Ten)
- Head coach: Francis Schmidt (7th season)
- MVP: Claude White
- Home stadium: Ohio Stadium

1940 Big Ten Conference football standings
	Conf.					Overall
Team	W		L		T	W		L		T
No. 1 Minnesota $	6	–	0	–	0	8	–	0	–	0
No. 3 Michigan	3	–	1	–	0	7	–	1	–	0
No. 8 Northwestern	4	–	2	–	0	6	–	2	–	0
Ohio State	3	–	3	–	0	4	–	4	–	0
Wisconsin	3	–	3	–	0	4	–	4	–	0
Iowa	2	–	3	–	0	4	–	4	–	0
Indiana	2	–	3	–	0	3	–	5	–	0
Purdue	1	–	4	–	0	2	–	6	–	0
Illinois	0	–	5	–	0	1	–	7	–	0
$ – Conference champion; Rankings from AP Poll

The 1940 Ohio State Buckeyes football team represented Ohio State University in the 1940 Big Ten Conference football season. The Buckeyes compiled a 4–4 record and were outscored 99–113.

Ohio State was ranked at No. 18 (out of 697 college football teams) in the final rankings under the Litkenhous Difference by Score system for 1940.

== Schedule ==
Date	Opponent	Rank	Site	Result	Attendance	Source
September 28	Pittsburgh*		Ohio Stadium; Columbus, OH	W 30–7	52,877	
October 5	Purdue		Ohio Stadium; Columbus, OH	W 17–14	54,556	
October 12	at Northwestern		Dyche Stadium; Evanston, IL	L 3–6	42,000	
October 19	No. 7 Minnesota	No. 15	Ohio Stadium; Columbus, OH	L 7–13	63,199	
October 26	at No. 1 Cornell*		Schoellkopf Field; Ithaca, NY	L 7–21	34,500	
November 2	Indiana		Ohio Stadium; Columbus, OH	W 21–6	56,667	
November 16	at Illinois		Memorial Stadium; Champaign, IL (Illibuck)	W 14–6	15,571	
November 23	No. 7 Michigan		Ohio Stadium; Columbus, OH (rivalry)	L 0–40	73,648	
*Non-conference game; Rankings from AP Poll released prior to the game

== Rankings ==
Ranking movements Legend: ██ Increase in ranking ██ Decrease in ranking — = Not ranked
	Week							
Poll	1	2	3	4	5	6	7	Final
AP	15	—	—	—	—	—	—	—

== Coaching staff ==
- Francis Schmidt, head coach, seventh year

== 1941 NFL draftees ==
Player	Round	Pick	Position	NFL club
Don Scott	1	9	Back	Chicago Bears
Jim Langhurst	10	89	Back	Brooklyn Dodgers
Claude White	15	132	Center	Chicago Cardinals
Jimmy Strausbaugh	20	186	Halfback	Green Bay Packers
