= Urban Odson =

American football player (1918–1986)

No. 63, 56
- Position: Tackle

Personal information
- Born: November 17, 1918; Clark, South Dakota, U.S.
- Died: June 22, 1986 (aged 67); Rapid City, South Dakota, U.S.
- Listed height: 6 ft 3 in (1.91 m)
- Listed weight: 251 lb (114 kg)

Career information
- High school: Clark
- College: Minnesota (1938-1941)
- NFL draft: 1942: 1st round, 9th overall pick

Career history
- Green Bay Packers (1946–1949); Montreal Alouettes (1950)

Awards and highlights
- 2× National champion (1940, 1941); Consensus All-American (1940); Second-team All American 1941; First-team All-Big Ten (1940); South Dakota Sports Hall of Fame; University of Minnesota "M" Club Athletic Hall of Fame

Career NFL statistics
- Games played: 39
- Fumble recoveries: 3
- Stats at Pro Football Reference

Urban Leroy Odson (November 17, 1918 – June 22, 1986) was an American professional football tackle in the National Football League (NFL) who played 44 games for the Green Bay Packers (1946–1949).

== Professional career ==
In 1942, the Green Bay Packers used the 9th pick in the 1st round of the 1942 NFL draft to sign Odson out of the University of Minnesota. Odson, a consensus All-American, starred on two undefeated NCAA National Championship teams for the Golden Gophers (1940 and 1941). Odson was selected to play in the 1942 College All-Star game on August 28, 1942 in front of 101,103 spectators against the Chicago Bears at Soldier Field in Chicago. Odson also was selected to play in the East-West Shrine All Star game. Odson entered the Navy and played for the legendary World War II Great Lakes football teams that played exhibition games against pro teams. Ensign Odson is listed on the Football and America: World War II Honor Roll at the Pro Football Hall of Fame in Canton, Ohio. After serving a tour in the Pacific theater aboard USS Amsterdam, Odson went on to play under Curly Lambeau for four seasons with the Packers and left the Packers after the 1949 season. After brief stops with Chicago and Baltimore in 1950 he joined the Montreal Alouettes of the Canadian Football League for one season.
