= Steve Thompson (defensive tackle, born 1965) =

American football player (1965–2016)

No. 67
- Position: Defensive tackle

Personal information
- Born: February 24, 1965; Aurora, Illinois, U.S.
- Died: February 15, 2016 (aged 50); Palatine, Illinois, U.S.
- Listed height: 6 ft 2 in (1.88 m)
- Listed weight: 275 lb (125 kg)

Career information
- High school: Aurora West
- College: Minnesota
- NFL draft: 1987: undrafted

Career history
- Washington Redskins (1987)

Career NFL statistics
- Sacks: 1
- Stats at Pro Football Reference

Steven Kenneth Thompson (June 24, 1965 – February 15, 2016) was an American professional football defensive tackle in the National Football League (NFL) for the Washington Redskins. He played college football at the University of Minnesota.
