= 1940 Illinois Fighting Illini football team =

American college football season

1940 Illinois Fighting Illini football
- Conference: Big Ten Conference
- Record: 1–7 (0–5 Big Ten)
- Head coach: Robert Zuppke (28th season)
- MVP: George Bernhardt
- Captain: Thomas J. Riggs
- Home stadium: Memorial Stadium

1940 Big Ten Conference football standings
	Conf.					Overall
Team	W		L		T	W		L		T
No. 1 Minnesota $	6	–	0	–	0	8	–	0	–	0
No. 3 Michigan	3	–	1	–	0	7	–	1	–	0
No. 8 Northwestern	4	–	2	–	0	6	–	2	–	0
Ohio State	3	–	3	–	0	4	–	4	–	0
Wisconsin	3	–	3	–	0	4	–	4	–	0
Iowa	2	–	3	–	0	4	–	4	–	0
Indiana	2	–	3	–	0	3	–	5	–	0
Purdue	1	–	4	–	0	2	–	6	–	0
Illinois	0	–	5	–	0	1	–	7	–	0
$ – Conference champion; Rankings from AP Poll

The 1940 Illinois Fighting Illini football team was an American football team that represented the University of Illinois during the 1940 Big Ten Conference football season. In their 28th season under head coach Robert Zuppke, the Illini compiled a 1–7 record (0–5 against conference opponents), finished in last place in the Big Ten Conference, and were outscored by a total of 144 to 71. Fullback George Bernhardt was selected as the team's most valuable player.

Illinois was ranked at No. 62 (out of 697 college football teams) in the final rankings under the Litkenhous Difference by Score system for 1940.

The team played home games at Memorial Stadium in Champaign, Illinois.

== Schedule ==
Date	Opponent	Site	Result	Attendance	Source
October 5	Bradley*	Memorial Stadium; Champaign, IL	W 31–0	31,000	
October 12	USC*	Memorial Stadium; Champaign, IL	L 7–13	30,125	
October 19	at No. 3 Michigan	Michigan Stadium; Ann Arbor, MI (rivalry)	L 0–28	39,114	
October 26	No. 2 Notre Dame^{†}*	Memorial Stadium; Champaign, IL	L 0–26	63,186	
November 2	at Wisconsin	Camp Randall Stadium; Madison, WI	L 6–13	28,000	
November 9	at No. 10 Northwestern	Dyche Stadium; Evanston, IL (rivalry)	L 14–32	35,000	
November 16	Ohio State	Memorial Stadium; Champaign, IL (Illibuck)	L 6–14	15,571	
November 23	at Iowa	Iowa Stadium; Iowa City, IA	L 7–18	19,759	
*Non-conference game; ^{†}Homecoming; Rankings from AP Poll released prior to the game
