= George Paskvan =

American football player (1918–2005)

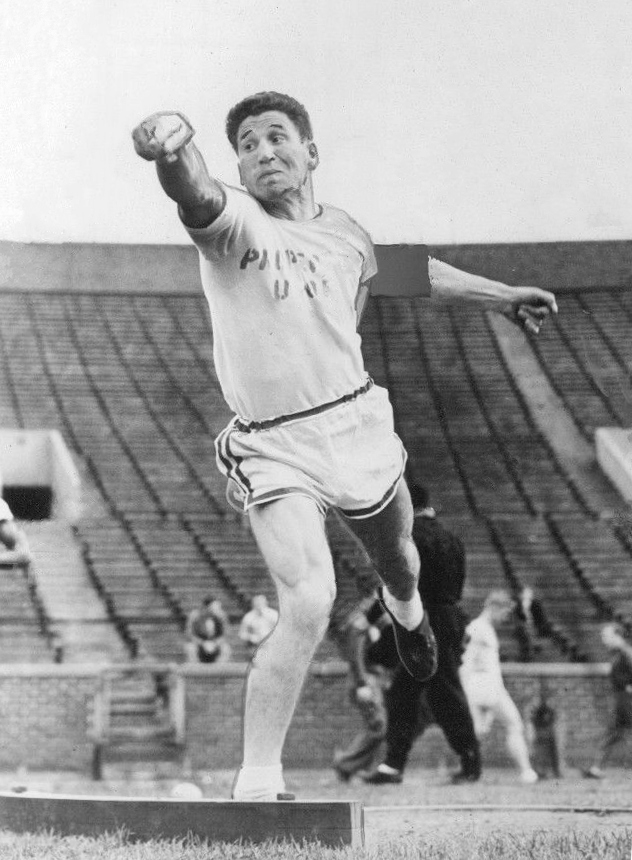
- Paskvan at a shot put competition in 1941

No. 68
- Position: Fullback

Personal information
- Born: April 28, 1918; McCook, Illinois, U.S.
- Died: April 25, 2005 (aged 86); Arden Hills, Minnesota, U.S.
- Listed height: 6 ft 0 in (1.83 m)
- Listed weight: 190 lb (86 kg)

Career information
- High school: Lyons Township (La Grange, Illinois)
- College: Wisconsin (1937-1940)
- NFL draft: 1941: 1st round, 7th overall pick

Career history
- Green Bay Packers (1941)

Awards and highlights
- Second-team All-American (1940); 2× First-team All-Big Ten (1939, 1940)

Career NFL statistics
- Rushing yards: 116
- Rushing average: 3.1
- Interceptions: 2
- Stats at Pro Football Reference

George Oscar Paskvan (April 28, 1918 – April 25, 2005) was an American professional football fullback who played professional in the National Football League (NFL) for seven games for with Green Bay Packers in 1941. The Packers used the seventh pick in the first round of the 1941 NFL draft to sign Paskvan out of the University of Wisconsin–Madison. Paskvan rushed 38 times for 116 yards in his NFL career. Besides football Paskvan also competed in the shot put.

Paskvan was married to Georgine E. Paskvan, who died before him. They had six children: Sue Joyce, Fran Greene, Tom, Tim, Paul and Mary.
