= Alf Bauman =

American football player (1920–1980)

- Bauman, c. 1941

No. 42, 73, 41
- Position: Tackle

Personal information
- Born: January 3, 1920; Chicago, Illinois, U.S.
- Died: May 20, 1980 (aged 60)
- Listed height: 6 ft 2 in (1.88 m)
- Listed weight: 228 lb (103 kg)

Career information
- High school: Austin (Chicago)
- College: Northwestern (1938-1941)
- NFL draft: 1942: 2nd round, 15th overall pick

Career history
- Philadelphia Eagles (1947); Chicago Rockets (1947); Chicago Bears (1948–1950)

Awards and highlights
- Consensus All-American (1940); First-team All-American (1941); 2× First-team All-Big Ten (1940, 1941)

Career NFL/AAFC statistics
- Games played: 34
- Games started: 12
- Fumble recoveries: 1
- Stats at Pro Football Reference

Alfred Ernest Bauman (January 3, 1920 – May 20, 1980) was an American professional football player.

Bauman was born in 1920 in Chicago and attended Austin High School in that city. He then attended Northwestern University, where he played college football for the Wildcats from 1939 to 1941. As a junior, he was a consensus pick for the 1940 All-America team, having received first-team honors at the tackle position from the United Press, Hearst Newspapers, Collier's Weekly, New York Sun, and Walter Camp Football Foundation. He also received the Wailing Wall award as lineman of the year in 1940. In 1941, he was named Northwestern's most valuable player.

Bauman was selected by the Detroit Lions in the second round (15th pick overall) of the 1942 NFL draft. He tried out with the Lions but was released. After five years away from the game, he played four seasons as a tackle in the All-America Football Conference (AAFC) and National Football League (NFL) for the Chicago Rockets (1947), Philadelphia Eagles (1947), and Chicago Bears (1948–1950). He played in a total of 39 AAFC and NFL games. During his time with the Rockets and Eagles, he appeared in only five games and never started a game. It was not until the 1950 season at age 30 that Bauman finally won a regular spot in the Bears' starting lineup.

Bauman moved to San Francisco in 1955. He served for a time as personnel director for the San Francisco 49ers. He lived in Pacifica, California, from 1962 until his death in 1979 at age 59. The cause of death was heart failure. His body was donated to the University of California hospital. His wife died several days later at the same hospital.
