= 1940 All-America college football team =

Official list of the best college football players of 1940

The 1940 All-America college football team is composed of college football players who were selected as All-Americans by various organizations and writers that chose All-America college football teams in 1940. The nine selectors recognized by the NCAA as "official" for the 1940 season are (1) Collier's Weekly, as selected by Grantland Rice, (2) the Associated Press (AP), (3) the United Press (UP), (4) the All-America Board (AAB), (5) the International News Service (INS), (6) Liberty magazine, (7) the Newspaper Enterprise Association (NEA), (8) Newsweek, and (9) the Sporting News (SN).

Michigan halfback (and Heisman Trophy winner) Tom Harmon, Texas A&M fullback John Kimbrough, and Tennessee guard Bob Suffridge were the only three unanimous first-team All-Americans chosen by all nine official selectors.

== Consensus All-Americans ==
For the year 1940, the NCAA recognizes nine published All-American teams as "official" designations for purposes of its consensus determinations. The following chart identifies the NCAA-recognized consensus All-Americans and displays which first-team designations they received.

| Name | Position | School | UP votes | Number | Official selectors | Other selectors |
|---|---|---|---|---|---|---|
| Tom Harmon | Halfback | Michigan | 478 | 9/9 | AAB, AP, CO, INS, LIB, NEA, NW, SN, UP | CP, DH, FD, NYS, WC |
| John Kimbrough | Fullback | Texas A&M | 474 | 9/9 | AAB, AP, CO, INS, LIB, NEA, NW, SN, UP | CP, DH, FD, NYS, WC |
| Bob Suffridge | Guard | Tennessee | 340 | 9/9 | AAB, AP, CO, INS, LIB, NEA, NW, SN, UP | CP, DH, FD, NYS, WC |
| George Franck | Halfback | Minnesota | 436 | 8/9 | AAB, AP, CO, INS, LIB, NW, SN, UP | CP, DH FD, NYS, WC |
| Nick Drahos | Tackle | Cornell | 382 | 8/9 | AAB, AP, INS, LIB, NEA, NW, SN, UP | CP, DH, FD, WC |
| Frankie Albert | Quarterback | Stanford | 229 | 6/9 | AAB, AP, CO, INS, NW, UP | CP, DH, FD, WC |
| Gene Goodreault | End | Boston College | 200 | 6/9 | AAB, CO, INS, NW, SN, UP | CP, DH, FD, WC |
| Rudy Mucha | Center | Washington | 201 | 5/9 | AAB, CO, NW, SN, UP | CP, WC |
| David Rankin | End | Purdue | | 4/9 | AAB, CO, SN, UP | WC |
| Marshall Robnett | Guard | Texas A&M | | 3/9 | AAB, NW, UP | CP, DH, FD, WC |
| Alf Bauman | Tackle | Northwestern | 184 | 3/9 | AAB, CO, UP | NYS, WC |
| Urban Odson | Tackle | Minnesota | | 3/9 | INS, LIB, NW | CP |

== All-American selections for 1940 ==
=== Ends ===
- Gene Goodreault, Boston College (College Football Hall of Fame) (AAB; CO-1; INS-1; NW; SN; UP-1; CP-1; DH; FD-1; WC-1; NEA-2)
- David Rankin, Purdue (AAB; AP-2; CO-1; INS-2; SN; UP-1; CP-2; FD-2; WC-1)
- Paul Severin, North Carolina (AP-1; INS-2; NEA-1; NW; UP-2; CP-2; DH; FD-1)
- Buddy Elrod, Mississippi State (AP-1; LIB; CP-1; NYS-1; NEA-3)
- Ed Frutig, Michigan (AP-3; INS-1; LIB; UP-3; CP-3)
- Jay MacDowell, Washington (NEA-1; CP-4; NYS-1)
- Joe Blalock, Clemson (UP-2)
- Loren MacKinney, Harvard (AP-2)
- William Jennings, Oklahoma (AP-3)
- Bob Ison, Georgia Tech (UP-3)
- Roland Goss, SMU (CP-3)
- Smith, UCLA (FD-2)
- Holt Rast, Alabama (NEA-2; CP-4)
- Jack Russell, Baylor (NEA-3)

=== Tackles ===
- Alf Bauman, Northwestern (AAB; AP-3; CO-1; INS-2; UP-1; CP-3; FD-2; NYS-1; WC-1; NEA-3)
- Nick Drahos, Cornell (College Football Hall of Fame) (AAB; AP-1; INS-1; LIB; NEA-1; NW; SN; UP-1; INS-1; CP-1; DH; FD-1; WC-1)
- Urban Odson, Minnesota (INS-1; LIB; NW; UP-2; CP-1; FD-2)
- Bob Reinhard, California (AP-1; CO-1; INS-2; CP-2; NEA-2)
- Forrest Behm, Nebraska (NEA-1)
- Tony Ruffa, Duke (AP-2; UP-3; CP-2; NEA-2)
- Fred Hartman, Rice (AP-2; CP-4)
- Vic Sears, Oregon State (CP-4; NYS-1)
- Joe Ungerer, Fordham (AP-3)
- Mike Enich, Iowa (UP-2; SN; DH; FD-1)
- Chip Routt, Texas A&M (UP-3)
- William Collins, Lafayette ()
- Abe Shires, Tennessee (CP-3; NEA-3)

=== Guards ===
- Bob Suffridge, Tennessee (College Football Hall of Fame) (AAB; AP-1; INS-1; CO-1; LIB; NEA-1; NW; SN; UP-1; CP-1; NYS-1; DH; FD-1; WC-1)
- Marshall Robnett, Texas A&M (AAB; AP-2; INS-2; NW; UP-1; CP-1; DH; FD-1; WC-1; NEA-3)
- Warren Alfson, Nebraska (AP-1; INS-1; UP-2; CP-2; FD-2)
- Augie Lio, Georgetown (College Football Hall of Fame) (CO-1; INS-2; UP-2; CP-2; FD-2; NYS-1; NEA-2)
- Helge Pukema, Minnesota (NEA-1)
- Hunter Cohern, Mississippi State (AP-2)
- George Kerr, Boston College (College Football Hall of Fame) (AP-3)
- Cecil Schefel, Denver (AP-3)
- Ray Frankowski, Washington (LIB; UP-3)
- Ed Molinski, Tennessee (College Football Hall of Fame) (SN; UP-3; CP-3; NEA-2)
- Hal Lahar, Oklahoma (CP-3)
- George Kinard, Ole Miss (CP-4)
- John W. Goree, LSU (CP-4)
- Tom Smith, Iowa State (NEA-3)

=== Centers ===
- Rudy Mucha, Washington (AAB; AP-2; CO-1; INS-2; NW; SN; UP-1; CP-1; WC-1)
- Leon Gajecki, Penn State (LIB; NEA-1; CP-2)
- Chet Gladchuk, Boston College (College Football Hall of Fame) (AP-1; UP-2)
- Ray Frick, Penn (INS-1; CP-3; FD-2; NYS-1)
- Ray Apolskis, Marquette (AP-3; UP-3; CP-4; DH; FD-1; NEA-2)
- Stuart Clarkson, Texas A&M-Kingsville (NEA-3)

=== Quarterbacks ===
- Frankie Albert, Stanford (College Football Hall of Fame) (AAB; AP-1; CO-1; INS-1; NW; UP-1; CP-1; DH; FD-1; WC-1)
- Paul Christman, Missouri (College Football Hall of Fame) (AP-2; INS-2; UP-2; CP-3; DH; FD-1; NEA-2)
- Henry Toczylowski, Boston College (NYS-1)
- Don Scott, Ohio State (UP-3; CP-3; NEA-2 [fb])
- Forest Evashevski, Michigan (CP-4; FD-2)
- Jim Lalanne, North Carolina (NEA-3)

=== Halfbacks ===
- Tom Harmon, Michigan (College Football Hall of Fame) (AAB; AP-1; CO-1; INS-1; LIB; NEA-1; NW; SN; UP-1; CP-1; NYS-1; DH; FD-1; WC-1)
- George Franck, Minnesota (College Football Hall of Fame) (AAB; AP-1; CO-1; INS-1; LIB; NW; SN; UP-1; CP-1; DH; FD-1; NYS-1; WC-1; NEA-2)
- Charlie O'Rourke, Boston College (College Football Hall of Fame) (AP-2; INS-2; NEA-1 [qb]; UP-2; CP-2; FD-2)
- Hugh Gallarneau, Stanford (College Football Hall of Fame) (NEA-1)
- Frank Reagan, Penn (AP-2; INS-2; LIB; SN; UP-2; CP-2; FD-2)
- Bill Dudley, Virginia (College and Pro Football Hall of Fame) (AP-3)
- Bob Foxx, Tennessee (AP-3; INS-2; CP-4)
- Jim Kisselburgh, Oregon State (AP-3; CP-4)
- Jim Thomason, Texas A&M (AP-3; CP-4; NEA-2)
- Merle Hapes, Ole Miss (UP-3; NEA-3)
- Steve Juzwik, Notre Dame (UP-3)
- Jimmy Nelson, Alabama (CP-2)
- Dave Allerdice, Princeton (CP-3)
- Milt Piepul, Notre Dame (CP-3)
- Bill Sewell, Washington State (FD-2)
- Dean McAdams, Washington (NEA-3)

=== Fullbacks ===
- John Kimbrough, Texas A&M (College Football Hall of Fame) (AAB; AP-1; CO-1; INS-1; LIB; NEA-1; NW; SN; UP-1; CP-1; NYS-1; WC-1; DH; FD-1)
- George Paskvan, Wisconsin (AP-2; UP-3)
- Norm Standlee, Stanford (UP-2; CP-2; FD-2; NEA-3)

== Key ==
Bold = Consensus All-American

- -1 – First-team selection
- -2 – Second-team selection
- -3 – Third-team selection

=== Official selectors ===
- AAB = All-America Board
- AP = Associated Press, based on a nationwide survey of expert opinion
- CO = Collier's Weekly, selected by Grantland Rice
- INS = International News Service, selected through a nationwide poll of coaches and sports writers
- LIB = Liberty magazine
- NEA = Newspaper Enterprise Association, picked with the aid and assistance of coaches, scouts, officials and football writers of the nation.
- NW = Newsweek
- SN = The Sporting News
- UP = United Press

=== Other selectors ===
- CP = Central Press Association, selected with the assistance of the nation's football captains
- DH = Deke Houlgate
- FD = Football Digest
- NYS = New York Sun
- WC = Walter Camp Football Foundation

== See also ==
- 1940 Little All-America college football team
- 1940 All-Big Six Conference football team
- 1940 All-Big Ten Conference football team
- 1940 All-Pacific Coast Conference football team
- 1940 All-SEC football team
- 1940 All-Southwest Conference football team
