= 1940 All-Big Ten Conference football team =

American college football all-star team

The 1940 All-Big Ten Conference football team consists of American football players selected to the All-Big Ten Conference teams selected by the Associated Press (AP) and United Press (UP) for the 1940 Big Ten Conference football season.

== All Big-Ten selections ==
=== Ends ===
- Ed Frutig, Michigan (AP-1, UP-1)
- Dave Rankin, Purdue (AP-1, UP-1)
- Charles Anderson, Ohio State (AP-2)
- Archie Harris, Indiana (AP-2)

=== Tackles ===
- Alf Bauman, Northwestern (AP-1, UP-1)
- Urban Odson, Minnesota (AP-1, UP-1)
- Mike Enich, Iowa (AP-2)
- Al Wistert, Michigan (AP-2)

=== Guards ===
- Ralph Fritz, Michigan (AP-1, UP-1)
- Joe Lokane, Northwestern (AP-1, UP-1)
- Richard P. Embick, Wisconsin (AP-2)
- Bill Kuusisto, Minnesota (AP-2)

=== Centers ===
- Paul Hiemenz, Northwestern (AP-1, UP-1)
- Claude White, Ohio State (AP-2)

=== Quarterbacks ===
- Forest Evashevski, Michigan (AP-1, UP-2)
- Don Scott, Ohio State (AP-2, UP-1)

=== Halfbacks ===
- Tom Harmon, Michigan (AP-1, UP-1) (1940 Heisman Trophy winner)
- George Franck, Minnesota (AP-1, UP-1)
- Bruce Smith, Minnesota (AP-2, UP-2)
- Ollie Hahnenstein, Northwestern (AP-2, UP-2)

=== Fullbacks ===
- George Paskvan, Wisconsin (AP-1, UP-1)
- Bob Westfall, Michigan (UP-2)
- William C. Green, Iowa (AP-2)

== Key ==
AP = Associated Press, chosen by conference coaches UP = United Press

Bold = Consensus first-team selection of both the AP and UP

== See also ==
- 1940 College Football All-America Team
