= Bob Paffrath =

American gridiron football player (1918–2005)

No. 61, 68, 59, 64, 38, 85
- Position: Back

Personal information
- Born: July 3, 1918; Mankato, Minnesota, U.S.
- Died: May 21, 2005 (aged 86); Beaverton, Oregon, U.S.
- Listed height: 5 ft 8 in (1.73 m)
- Listed weight: 190 lb (86 kg)

Career information
- High school: Redwood Valley (Redwood Falls, Minnesota)
- College: Minnesota (1937-1940)
- NFL draft: 1941: 3rd round, 21st overall pick

Career history
- Brooklyn Dodgers (1946); Miami Seahawks (1946); Toronto Indians (1947); Ottawa Rough Riders (1948-1949); Edmonton Eskimos (1950-1952)

Awards and highlights
- Imperial Oil Trophy (1947); 5× CFL All-Star (1947-1951); National champion (1940)

Career AAFC statistics
- Rushing yards: 100
- Rushing average: 3.2
- Touchdowns: 2
- Stats at Pro Football Reference

Robert William Paffrath (July 3, 1918 – May 21, 2005) was an American professional football player who was a halfback. He was selected by the Green Bay Packers in the third round of the 1941 NFL draft.

He took time away from football to serve in the US Army Air Forces during World War II, where he was a private first class - though he played football while in the Army too.

He played for the Miami Seahawks and the Brooklyn Dodgers of the All-America Football Conference (AAFC), for the Ottawa Rough Riders of the Interprovincial Rugby Football Union, and for the Edmonton Eskimos of the Western Interprovincial Football Union. Paffrath also played one year in the Ontario Rugby Football Union with the Toronto Indians, where he was MVP.
