= David Rankin (American football) =

American football player (1919–2006)

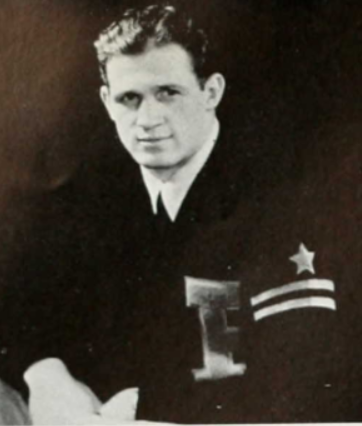
- Rankin from the 1941 "Debris"

Profile
- Position: End

Personal information
- Born: February 2, 1919
- Died: December 8, 2006 (aged 87); Lafayette, Indiana, U.S.

Career information
- College: Purdue University

Career history
- 1938–1940: Purdue Boilermakers

Awards and highlights
- Consensus All-American (1940); First-team All-American (1939); 2× First-team All-Big Ten (1939, 1940)

David William Rankin (February 2, 1919 – December 8, 2006) was an American football player and track athlete and coach. He was a consensus first-team All-American at the end position at Purdue University in 1940. He also set a U.S. indoor record in the 60-yard low hurdles in 1940. During World War II, he served as a fighter pilot in the United States Marine Corps. He later worked as the head coach of the Purdue track team from 1946 to 1981. He was also an assistant football coach at Purdue in 1947 and 1948. He was also the U.S. track team coach at the 1975 World University Games. He has been inducted into the Purdue Intercollegiate Athletics Hall of Fame (1998), the Indiana Football Hall of Fame (1977) and the Drake Relays Coaches Hall of Fame (1995). Rankin died in 2006 at the age of 87.
