= Ralph Fritz =

American football player and coach (1917–2002)

No. 63
- Position: Guard

Personal information
- Born: November 23, 1917; New Kensington, Pennsylvania, U.S.
- Died: February 4, 2002 (aged 84); Miami, Florida, U.S.
- Listed height: 5 ft 9 in (1.75 m)
- Listed weight: 202 lb (92 kg)

Career information
- High school: Valley (New Kensington); The Kiski School (Saltsburg, Pennsylvania)
- College: Michigan
- NFL draft: 1941: 10th round, 82nd overall pick

Career history
- Philadelphia Eagles (1941)

Awards and highlights
- First-team All-Big Ten (1940)

Career NFL statistics
- Games played: 10
- Games started: 1
- Stats at Pro Football Reference

Ralph C. Fritz (November 23, 1917 – February 4, 2002) was an American professional football player and coach. A native of New Kensington, Pennsylvania, Fritz attended The Kiski School before enrolling at the University of Michigan. He played guard for the Michigan Wolverines football team from 1939 to 1940. In 1940, he was chosen by conference coaches as a first-team player on the Associated Press All-Big Ten Conference team. Fritz later played professional football for the Philadelphia Eagles in 1941. He was drafted in the tenth round of the 1941 NFL Draft by the Pittsburgh Steelers. Fritz was one of the more than 1,000 NFL personnel who served in the military during World War II. Starting in 1949, Fritz worked as a high school football coach in Wauchula, Florida. In 1954, Fritz was hired as the athletic director and football coach at Lake Wales High School in Lake Wales, Florida. Fritz died in 2002 at age 84 while living in Miami, Florida.
