= George Franck =

American football player (1918–2011)

- Franck in 1947

No. 13, 5, 37
- Position: Halfback

Personal information
- Born: September 23, 1918; Davenport, Iowa, U.S.
- Died: January 19, 2011 (aged 92); Rock Island, Illinois, U.S.
- Listed height: 6 ft 0 in (1.83 m)
- Listed weight: 176 lb (80 kg)

Career information
- High school: Central (Davenport)
- College: Minnesota (1937–1940)
- NFL draft: 1941: 1st round, 6th overall pick

Career history
- New York Giants (1941, 1945–1947); Baltimore Colts (1948)*
- * Offseason or practice squad member only

Awards and highlights
- National champion (1940); Consensus All-American (1940); First-team All-Big Ten (1940); Second-team All-Big Ten (1939)

Career NFL statistics
- Rushing yards: 506
- Rushing average: 3.5
- Receptions: 27
- Receiving yards: 536
- Total touchdowns: 8
- Stats at Pro Football Reference
- College Football Hall of Fame

George Henning "Sonny" Franck (September 23, 1918 – January 19, 2011) was an American professional football halfback who played in the National Football League (NFL) for the New York Giants.

== Early life ==
Franck was born in Davenport, Iowa. After his playing years and early teaching and coaching career he returned to nearby Rock Island, Illinois.

Franck played college football at the University of Minnesota from 1938 to 1940, where he was a key player in the dominant national championship team of 1940. While in college Franck was a member of Phi Delta Theta fraternity. He was drafted in the first round (sixth overall) in the 1941 NFL draft. Franck was inducted into the College Football Hall of Fame in 2002.

== War service ==
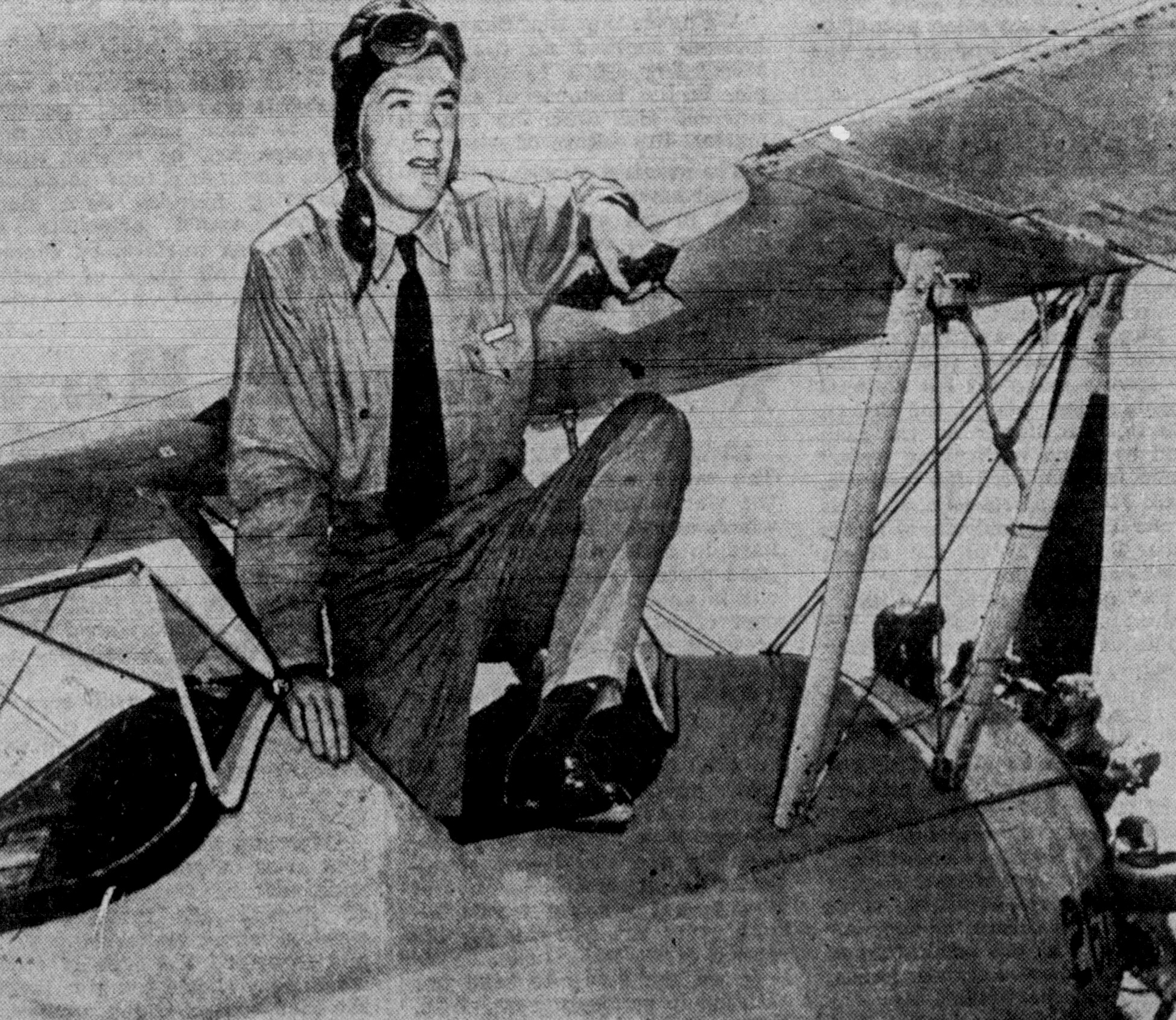
Franck in 1942.

After the attack on Pearl Harbor, Franck joined the U.S. Marines Corps and served as a pilot. He was also a spotter during the Battle of Iwo Jima. There he saw Notre Dame football star Jack Chevigny take cover in a crater shortly before Chevigny was killed in action. Franck later served aboard the USS Hornet (CV-12).

== Post-war ==
After the war, he continued to play with the Giants from 1945 to 1947. He eventually became a high school teacher and coach in Oklahoma City and then Rock Island High School in Illinois. He was a member of Broadway Presbyterian Church and enjoyed bowling. He was survived by Helen, his wife of 57 years. He bought and lived in the Shields House in Highland Park Historic District in Rock Island, IL., which is now owned by Filipino-American author, Jason Tanamor.
