= 1940 Minnesota Golden Gophers football team =

American college football season

1940 Minnesota Golden Gophers football

AP Poll national champion Big Ten champion
- Conference: Big Ten Conference

Ranking
- AP: No. 1
- Record: 8–0 (6–0 Big Ten)
- Head coach: Bernie Bierman (9th season)
- Offensive scheme: Single-wing
- MVP: Bob Paffrath
- Captains: Bob Bjorklund; Bill Johnson
- Home stadium: Memorial Stadium

1940 Big Ten Conference football standings
	Conf.					Overall
Team	W		L		T	W		L		T
No. 1 Minnesota $	6	–	0	–	0	8	–	0	–	0
No. 3 Michigan	3	–	1	–	0	7	–	1	–	0
No. 8 Northwestern	4	–	2	–	0	6	–	2	–	0
Ohio State	3	–	3	–	0	4	–	4	–	0
Wisconsin	3	–	3	–	0	4	–	4	–	0
Iowa	2	–	3	–	0	4	–	4	–	0
Indiana	2	–	3	–	0	3	–	5	–	0
Purdue	1	–	4	–	0	2	–	6	–	0
Illinois	0	–	5	–	0	1	–	7	–	0
$ – Conference champion; Rankings from AP Poll

The 1940 Minnesota Golden Gophers football team represented the University of Minnesota in the 1940 Big Ten Conference football season. In their ninth year under head coach Bernie Bierman, the Golden Gophers compiled an undefeated 8–0 record and outscored their opponents by a combined total of 154 to 71.

The team was selected national champion in the Associated Press Poll and by nine other NCAA-designated major selectors, then and in the decades since: Berryman, Boand, DeVold, Dickinson, Football Research, Houlgate, Litkenhous, National Championship Foundation, Sagarin, Sagarin (ELO-Chess) The team did not play in a bowl game.

Tackle Urban Odson was named an All-American by Liberty. Halfback George Franck was named an All-American by the Walter Camp Football Foundation, Associated Press, United Press International, Look Magazine and Collier's. Franck placed third in voting for the Heisman Trophy. Franck and Odson were also named All-Big Ten first team.

Quarterback Bob Paffrath received the Team MVP Award.

Total attendance for the season was 234,990, which averaged to 46,998. The season high for attendance was against Michigan.

== Schedule ==
Date	Opponent	Rank	Site	Result	Attendance	Source
September 28	Washington*		Memorial Stadium; Minneapolis, MN	W 19–14	46,000	
October 5	Nebraska*		Memorial Stadium; Minneapolis, MN (rivalry)	W 13–7	41,000	
October 19	at No. 15 Ohio State	No. 7	Ohio Stadium; Columbus, OH	W 13–7	63,199	
October 26	Iowa^{†}	No. 6	Memorial Stadium; Minneapolis, MN (rivalry)	W 34–6	62,992	
November 2	at No. 8 Northwestern	No. 4	Dyche Stadium; Evanston, IL	W 13–12	48,000	
November 9	No. 3 Michigan	No. 2	Memorial Stadium; Minneapolis, MN (Little Brown Jug)	W 7–6	60,481	
November 16	Purdue	No. 1	Memorial Stadium; Minneapolis, MN	W 33–6	30,163	
November 23	at Wisconsin	No. 1	Camp Randall Stadium; Madison, WI (rivalry)	W 22–13	38,000	
*Non-conference game; ^{†}Homecoming; Rankings from AP Poll released prior to the game

== Rankings ==
Ranking movements Legend: ██ Increase in ranking ██ Decrease in ranking ( ) = First-place votes
	Week							
Poll	1	2	3	4	5	6	7	Final
AP	7 (2)	6 (8)	4 (13)	2 (18)	1 (55.33)	1 (68)	1 (88)	1 (65)

== Game summaries ==
=== Michigan ===
Week 6: Michigan at Minnesota

Team	1	2	3	4	Total
Michigan	0	6	0	0	6
• Minnesota	0	7	0	0	7

- Date: November 9, 1940
- Location: Memorial Stadium
  Minneapolis
- Game attendance: 63,894
- Referee: Frank Birch (Earlham)

On November 9, 1940, Minnesota played its annual rivalry game with Michigan. The game was the 31st between the programs, with Minnesota having won the previous six games under head coach Bernie Bierman. The 1940 game was played "in the mud and rain" at Memorial Stadium in Minneapolis. Both teams came into the game undefeated with Minnesota ranked #2 and Michigan ranked #3 in the AP Poll. The game was played before a crowd of 63,894 spectators, the largest crowd at a Minnesota home game to that point.

In the first quarter, Michigan drove to the Minnesota one-yard line, but Tom Harmon slipped on fourth down, and the ball went to Minnesota on downs. In the second quarter, Michigan took a 6-0 lead on a touchdown pass from Harmon to Forest Evashevski. Harmon missed "by inches" the kick for extra point. Later in the second quarter, Michigan's Ed Frutig blocked a Minnesota punt that was recovered by Michigan's Reuben Kelto at the Minnesota three-yard line. However, Harmon's pass into the end zone was intercepted, and Minnesota took over at the 20-yard line. On the next play from scrimmage, Minnesota scored on an 80-yard run by Bruce Smith. Joe Mernik kicked the extra point which was the difference in the game, Minnesota winning by a 7-6 score.

Michigan outgained Minnesota with 210 yards from scrimmage to 199 for Minnesota and also led with 15 first downs to five for the Gophers. The 1941 Michiganensian opined: "The Wolverines completely outplayed the Bierman charges with fifteen first downs to five . . . but it was to no avail, as Harmon, trying to dive forward with his famous cutback, was continually pulled down by old man mud. . . . Minnesota went on to win the National Championship, while Michigan finished third, but here in Ann Arbor, we'll always believe it was rain and not the Gophers which pushed Michigan out of what would have been its first national championship since 1932."
