= List of Missouri Tigers in the NFL draft =

This is a list of Missouri Tigers football players in the NFL draft.

== Key ==
B	Back	K	Kicker	NT	Nose tackle
C	Center	LB	Linebacker	FB	Fullback
DB	Defensive back	P	Punter	HB	Halfback
DE	Defensive end	QB	Quarterback	WR	Wide receiver
DT	Defensive tackle	RB	Running back	G	Guard
E	End	T	Offensive tackle	TE	Tight end

== Selections ==
Year	Round	Pick	Player	Team	Position
1937	5	45	Jack Frye	Pittsburgh Steelers	B
1939	5	35	Jack Kinnison	Brooklyn Dodgers	C
1940	8	68	Roland Orf	Washington Redskins	E
1940	9	76	Bob Haas	Detroit Lions	T
1940	15	136	Stillman Rouse	Detroit Lions	E
1940	21	193	Mel Wetzel	Washington Redskins	T
1940	22	196	Bob Orf	Detroit Lions	E
1941	2	13	Paul Christman	Chicago Cardinals	QB
1941	17	152	Ray Schultz	Chicago Cardinals	G
1942	7	60	Bob Jeffries	Chicago Bears	G
1942	9	71	Rayburn Chase	Pittsburgh Steelers	B
1942	13	113	Bob Brenton	Philadelphia Eagles	T
1942	20	184	Norvell Wallach	Chicago Cardinals	T
1943	1	9	Bob Steuber	Chicago Bears	RB
1943	17	156	Jack Lister	New York Giants	E
1943	22	203	Don Reece	Brooklyn Dodgers	B
1943	23	211	Mike Fitzgerald	Detroit Lions	G
1943	24	225	Hal Adams	Cleveland Rams	B
1943	27	255	Jeff Davis	Cleveland Rams	C
1943	28	261	Bert Ekern	Detroit Lions	E
1944	9	84	Jack Morton	Chicago Bears	E
1944	15	143	Jack Carpenter	Chicago Cardinals	T
1944	17	175	Marshall Shurnas	Boston Yanks	E
1944	27	277	Fred Bouldin	Detroit Lions	B
1944	30	315	Bernie Pepper	Chicago Bears	T
1945	2	14	Paul Collins	Chicago Cardinals	B
1945	3	19	Bill Dellastatious	Pittsburgh Steelers	B
1945	8	66	Tom Hughes	Pittsburgh Steelers	T
1945	17	173	Jim Austin	Philadelphia Eagles	B
1946	1	8	Bill Dellastatious	Detroit Lions	B
1946	32	296	Joervin Henderson	Green Bay Packers	C
1947	3	14	Jim Kekeris	Detroit Lions	T
1948	12	104	Mel Sheehan	Chicago Bears	E
1948	14	119	Hal Entsminger	Boston Yanks	B
1948	15	128	Eddie Quirk	Washington Redskins	B
1948	23	211	Fred Kling	Green Bay Packers	B
1948	26	238	Roland Oakes	Washington Redskins	E
1949	7	68	Chet Fritz	Washington Redskins	G
1949	20	201	Lloyd Brinkman	Philadelphia Eagles	B
1950	2	25	Bob Fuchs	Los Angeles Rams	C
1950	6	71	Gene Pepper	Washington Redskins	G
1950	7	91	Win Carter	Cleveland Browns	B
1950	9	114	Dick Braznell	Chicago Bears	B
1951	13	150	Ed Stephens	Green Bay Packers	B
1951	19	223	Gene Ackerman	Chicago Cardinals	E
1951	20	238	John Glorioso	Philadelphia Eagles	B
1951	28	329	John Kadlec	Washington Redskins	G
1952	20	235	Roger Kinson	Washington Redskins	C
1952	24	288	Junior Wren	Cleveland Browns	B
1953	3	30	Bill Rowekamp	Chicago Bears	B
1953	5	51	Nick Carras	Washington Redskins	B
1954	10	112	Bob Schoonmaker	Baltimore Colts	B
1955	11	126	Vic Eaton	Pittsburgh Steelers	B
1955	12	140	Hank Burnine	New York Giants	E
1955	25	294	Charlie Bull	Pittsburgh Steelers	G
1955	26	305	Jim Jennings	Green Bay Packers	E
1956	16	189	Al Portney	New York Giants	T
1956	19	225	Ray Dettring	New York Giants	B
1956	22	264	Dick Fouts	Los Angeles Rams	E
1957	6	68	James Hunter	San Francisco 49ers	B
1957	11	131	Carl Osterich	Detroit Lions	C
1957	21	244	Chuck Mehrer	Green Bay Packers	T
1958	29	348	Frank Czapla	Cleveland Browns	T
1959	24	286	Charley James	New York Giants	B
1960	2	16	Mike Magac	San Francisco 49ers	G
1960	18	205	Bob Haas	Houston Oilers	B
1961	2	23	Danny LaRose	Detroit Lions	E
1961	11	142	Norris Stevenson	Dallas Cowboys	B
1961	15	204	Mel West	St. Louis Cardinals	B
1962	2	28	Ed Blaine	Green Bay Packers	G
1962	16	215	Bill Wegener	St. Louis Cardinals	G
1963	7	94	Paul Underhill	Chicago Bears	B
1963	10	131	Bill Siekierski	Baltimore Colts	G
1963	14	189	Bill Tobin	San Francisco 49ers	B
1963	16	220	Andy Russell	Pittsburgh Steelers	LB
1964	4	52	George Seals	New York Giants	DE
1964	9	120	Vince Turner	Baltimore Colts	B
1964	17	228	Bud Abell	Dallas Cowboys	E
1964	20	276	Ralph Kubinski	St. Louis Cardinals	G
1965	4	54	Johnny Roland	St. Louis Cardinals	RB
1965	9	125	Gary Lane	Cleveland Browns	QB
1966	1	10	Francis Peay	New York Giants	T
1966	2	31	Butch Allison	Baltimore Colts	T
1966	12	174	Bruce Van Dyke	Philadelphia Eagles	G
1967	3	61	Earl Denny	Minnesota Vikings	WR
1967	7	184	William Powell	Green Bay Packers	LB
1967	10	238	Charlie Brown	New Orleans Saints	WR
1967	12	295	Jim Whitaker	Miami Dolphins	DB
1967	13	341	Gary Grossnickle	New Orleans Saints	DB
1967	14	343	Bill Bates	New York Giants	K
1968	1	4	Russ Washington	San Diego Chargers	T
1968	4	97	John Douglas	Dallas Cowboys	LB
1968	5	131	Mike Wempe	Cleveland Browns	T
1968	12	322	Barry Lischner	Houston Oilers	RB
1969	1	19	Roger Wehrli	St. Louis Cardinals	DB
1969	5	107	Jim Anderson	Philadelphia Eagles	G
1969	8	205	Elmer Benhardt	Dallas Cowboys	LB
1969	16	395	Bill Schmidt	Cincinnati Bengals	LB
1970	5	105	Jon Staggers	Pittsburgh Steelers	DB
1970	8	207	Michael Carroll	Minnesota Vikings	G
1970	10	239	Henry Brown	Boston Patriots	K
1970	12	287	Butch Davis	Chicago Bears	DB
1971	1	11	Joe Moore	Chicago Bears	RB
1971	2	28	James Harrison	Chicago Bears	RB
1971	4	81	Larron Jackson	Houston Oilers	T
1971	5	121	Rocky Wallace	St. Louis Cardinals	LB
1971	6	147	Mel Gray	St. Louis Cardinals	WR
1971	8	185	Tyrone Walls	Buffalo Bills	RB
1972	4	80	Lorenzo Brinkley	Pittsburgh Steelers	DB
1972	8	197	Henry Stuckey	Detroit Lions	DB
1973	9	210	Mike Fink	New Orleans Saints	DB
1974	3	77	Scott Anderson	Minnesota Vikings	C
1974	5	126	John Kelsey	Dallas Cowboys	T
1974	8	191	Jim Schnietz	San Francisco 49ers	G
1974	9	223	Tom Reamon	Pittsburgh Steelers	RB
1974	17	423	John Moseley	St. Louis Cardinals	DB
1975	12	305	Mark Johnson	Buffalo Bills	DE
1975	16	411	Mark Miller	St. Louis Cardinals	WR
1976	2	32	Tony Galbreath	New Orleans Saints	RB
1976	3	79	Henry Marshall	Kansas City Chiefs	WR
1976	13	350	Kenny Downing	New Orleans Saints	DB
1977	1	11	Morris Towns	Houston Oilers	T
1977	1	19	Steve Pisarkiewicz	St. Louis Cardinals	QB
1977	3	59	Curtis Brown	Buffalo Bills	RB
1977	7	186	Randy Frisch	Pittsburgh Steelers	DT
1977	12	327	Curtis Kirkland	Washington Redskins	DE
1978	2	33	James Taylor	New Orleans Saints	T
1978	4	104	Pete Woods	Kansas City Chiefs	QB
1978	4	108	Joe Stewart	Oakland Raiders	WR
1979	1	13	Kellen Winslow	San Diego Chargers	TE
1979	5	112	Earl Gant	Kansas City Chiefs	RB
1979	9	221	Steve Hamilton	San Francisco 49ers	DT
1979	11	278	Ken Bungarda	Cincinnati Bengals	DE
1980	4	105	Kurt Petersen	Dallas Cowboys	DE
1980	7	192	Gerry Ellis	Los Angeles Rams	RB
1981	1	26	Howard Richards	Dallas Cowboys	T
1981	2	34	James Wilder Sr.	Tampa Bay Buccaneers	RB
1981	2	40	Eric Wright	San Francisco 49ers	DB
1981	5	123	Wendell Ray	Minnesota Vikings	DE
1981	6	144	Johnnie Poe	New Orleans Saints	DB
1981	7	172	Bill Whitaker	Green Bay Packers	DB
1981	7	173	Ron Fellows	Dallas Cowboys	DB
1982	2	30	Brad Edelman	New Orleans Saints	C
1982	4	88	Jeff Gaylord	Los Angeles Rams	LB
1983	5	115	Demetrious Johnson	Detroit Lions	DB
1983	9	226	Kevin Potter	Houston Oilers	DB
1983	12	326	Andy Ekern	New England Patriots	T
1984	4	87	Conrad Goode	New York Giants	T
1984	4	91	Bobby Bell	New York Jets	LB
1984	8	223	Jeff Smith	Washington Redskins	DB
1984	11	296	Craig White	Buffalo Bills	WR
1984	12	335	Curtland Thomas	Washington Redskins	WR
1985	4	109	Anthony Davis	Seattle Seahawks	TE
1985	6	145	George Shorthose	Miami Dolphins	WR
1985	11	300	Terry Matichak	Pittsburgh Steelers	DB
1986	10	260	Warren Seitz	Pittsburgh Steelers	WR
1987	1	15	John Clay	Los Angeles Raiders	T
1987	10	277	Dick Chapura	Chicago Bears	DT
1988	3	63	Erik McMillan	New York Jets	DT
1988	5	117	Robert Delpino	Los Angeles Rams	RB
1988	9	239	Jeff Cross	Miami Dolphins	DE
1989	8	200	Carl Bax	Tampa Bay Buccaneers	G
1989	9	247	Curtis Wilson	New England Patriots	C
1990	11	283	Tommie Stowers	San Diego Chargers	TE
1991	8	196	Harry Colon	New England Patriots	DB
1991	8	208	Tim Bruton	Indianapolis Colts	TE
1991	9	235	Damon Mays	Dallas Cowboys	WR
1991	12	316	Linzy Collins	Green Bay Packers	WR
1992	10	266	Mario Johnson	New York Jets	DT
1993	2	50	Victor Bailey	Philadelphia Eagles	WR
1994	5	158	A. J. Ofodile	Buffalo Bills	TE
1996	5	151	Steve Martin	Indianapolis Colts	DT
1998	7	224	Ernest Blackwell	Kansas City Chiefs	RB
1998	7	233	Ron Janes	Arizona Cardinals	RB
1999	5	163	Craig Heimburger	Green Bay Packers	C
2000	5	161	Jeff Marriott	New England Patriots	DT
2001	1	4	Justin Smith	Cincinnati Bengals	DE
2003	5	143	Justin Gage	Chicago Bears	WR
2003	6	214	Keith Wright	Houston Texans	DT
2005	3	89	Atiyyah Ellison	Carolina Panthers	DT
2005	5	142	Damien Nash	Tennessee Titans	RB
2005	6	191	C. J. Mosley	Minnesota Vikings	DT
2006	4	103	Brad Smith	New York Jets	WR
2006	7	243	Tony Palmer	St. Louis Rams	G
2007	4	113	Brian Smith	Jacksonville Jaguars	DE
2008	4	105	William Franklin	Kansas City Chiefs	WR
2008	4	111	Martin Rucker	Cleveland Browns	TE
2009	1	19	Jeremy Maclin	Philadelphia Eagles	WR
2009	1	32	Ziggy Hood	Pittsburgh Steelers	DT
2009	2	55	William Moore	Atlanta Falcons	DB
2009	3	98	Chase Coffman	Cincinnati Bengals	TE
2009	5	139	Colin Brown	Kansas City Chiefs	T
2009	6	199	Stryker Sulak	Oakland Raiders	DE
2010	1	19	Sean Weatherspoon	Atlanta Falcons	LB
2011	1	7	Aldon Smith	San Francisco 49ers	DE
2011	1	10	Blaine Gabbert	Jacksonville Jaguars	QB
2011	7	234	Andrew Gachkar	San Diego Chargers	LB
2012	3	78	Michael Egnew	Miami Dolphins	TE
2013	1	13	Sheldon Richardson	New York Jets	DT
2013	3	97	Zaviar Gooden	Tennessee Titans	LB
2014	2	60	Kony Ealy	Carolina Panthers	DE
2014	2	64	Justin Britt	Seattle Seahawks	T
2014	6	188	E. J. Gaines	St. Louis Rams	DB
2014	7	249	Michael Sam	St. Louis Rams	DE
2015	1	23	Shane Ray	Denver Broncos	DE
2015	2	41	Dorial Green-Beckham	Tennessee Titans	WR
2015	2	49	Mitch Morse	Kansas City Chiefs	G
2015	2	58	Markus Golden	Arizona Cardinals	LB
2015	6	201	Bud Sasser	St. Louis Rams	WR
2015	7	230	Marcus Murphy	New Orleans Saints	RB
2016	4	128	Evan Boehm	Arizona Cardinals	C
2016	5	144	Connor McGovern	Denver Broncos	G
2016	5	160	Kentrell Brothers	Minnesota Vikings	LB
2017	1	22	Charles Harris	Miami Dolphins	DE
2018	4	133	J'Mon Moore	Green Bay Packers	WR
2019	2	42	Drew Lock	Denver Broncos	QB
2019	7	215	Terry Beckner	Tampa Bay Buccaneers	DT
2020	3	88	Jordan Elliott	Cleveland Browns	DT
2020	4	108	Albert Okwuegbunam	Denver Broncos	TE
2021	2	58	Nick Bolton	Kansas City Chiefs	LB
2021	4	143	Tyree Gillespie	Las Vegas Raiders	DB
2021	5	151	Larry Borom	Chicago Bears	T
2021	6	188	Joshuah Bledsoe	New England Patriots	DB
2021	6	198	Larry Rountree III	Los Angeles Chargers	RB
2022	4	118	Akayleb Evans	Minnesota Vikings	DB
2022	6	196	Tyler Badie	Baltimore Ravens	RB
2023	4	126	Isaiah McGuire	Cleveland Browns	DE
2024	1	27	Darius Robinson	Arizona Cardinals	DE
2024	2	61	Ennis Rakestraw Jr.	Detroit Lions	DB
2024	3	91	Ty'Ron Hopper	Green Bay Packers	LB
2024	4	114	Javon Foster	Jacksonville Jaguars	T
2024	5	145	Kris Abrams-Draine	Denver Broncos	DB
2024	5	151	Jaylon Carlies	Indianapolis Colts	DB
2025	1	7	Armand Membou	New York Jets	T
2025	2	39	Luther Burden III	Chicago Bears	WR
2025	7	220	Marcus Bryant	New England Patriots	OT
2026	2	45	Zion Young	Baltimore Ravens	LB
2026	2	46	Josiah Trotter	Tampa Bay Buccaneers	LB
2026	3	77	Chris McClellan	Green Bay Packers	DT
2026	3	93	Keagen Trost	Los Angeles Rams	T
2026	5	177	Kevin Coleman Jr.	Miami Dolphins	WR
2026	7	220	Toriano Pride Jr.	Buffalo Bills	CB
