= List of Detroit Lions first-round draft picks =

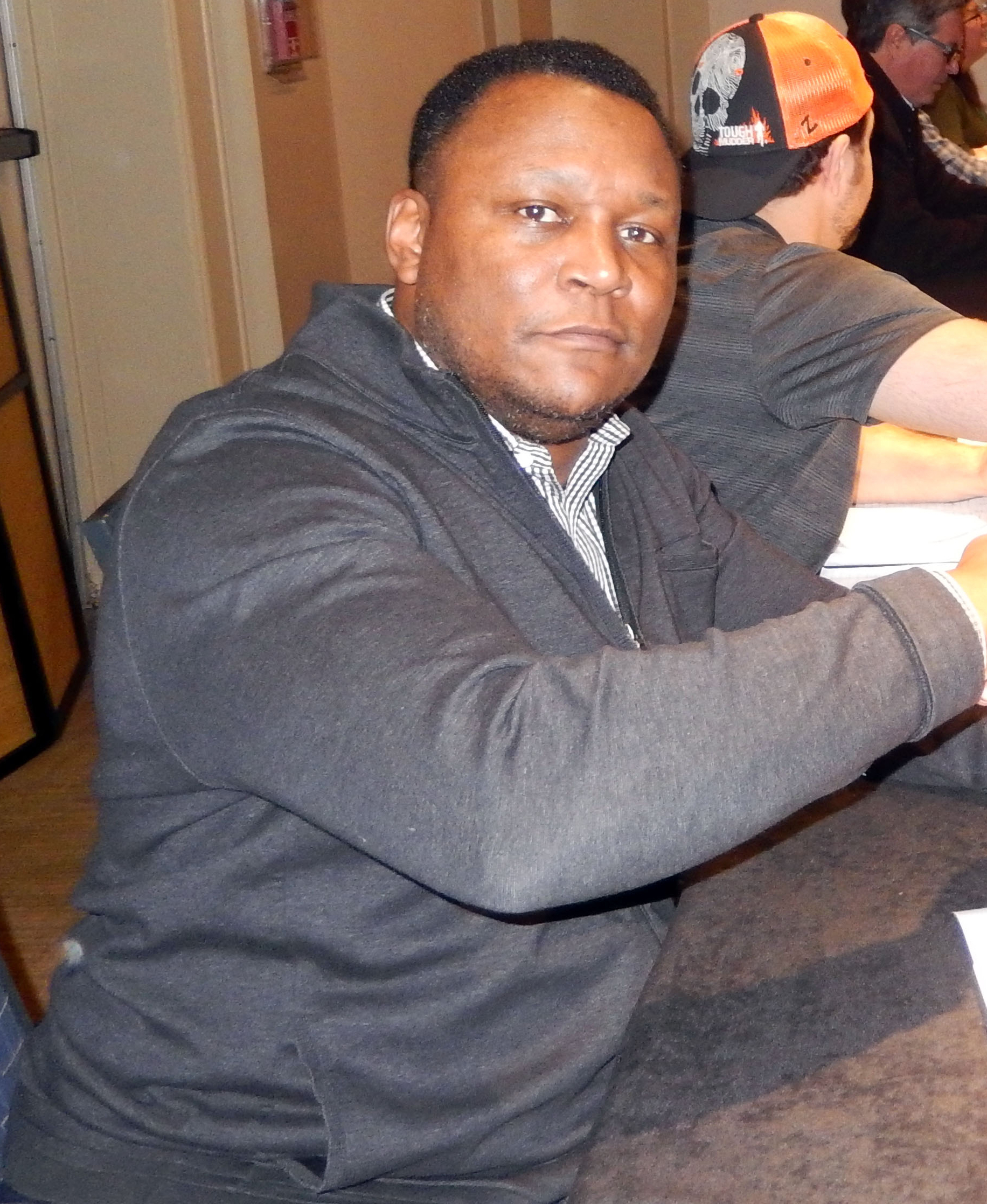
Running back Barry Sanders was drafted third overall in 1989. He spent his whole 10-year career with the Lions, during which time he was a 10-time All-Pro, 10-time Pro Bowler, two-time Offensive Player of the Year, and the 1997 MVP. A first-ballot Pro Football Hall of Famer, Sanders rushed for over 1,000 yards in every season he played and led the league in rushing yards four times. He was also selected to the NFL 100th Anniversary All-Time Team.

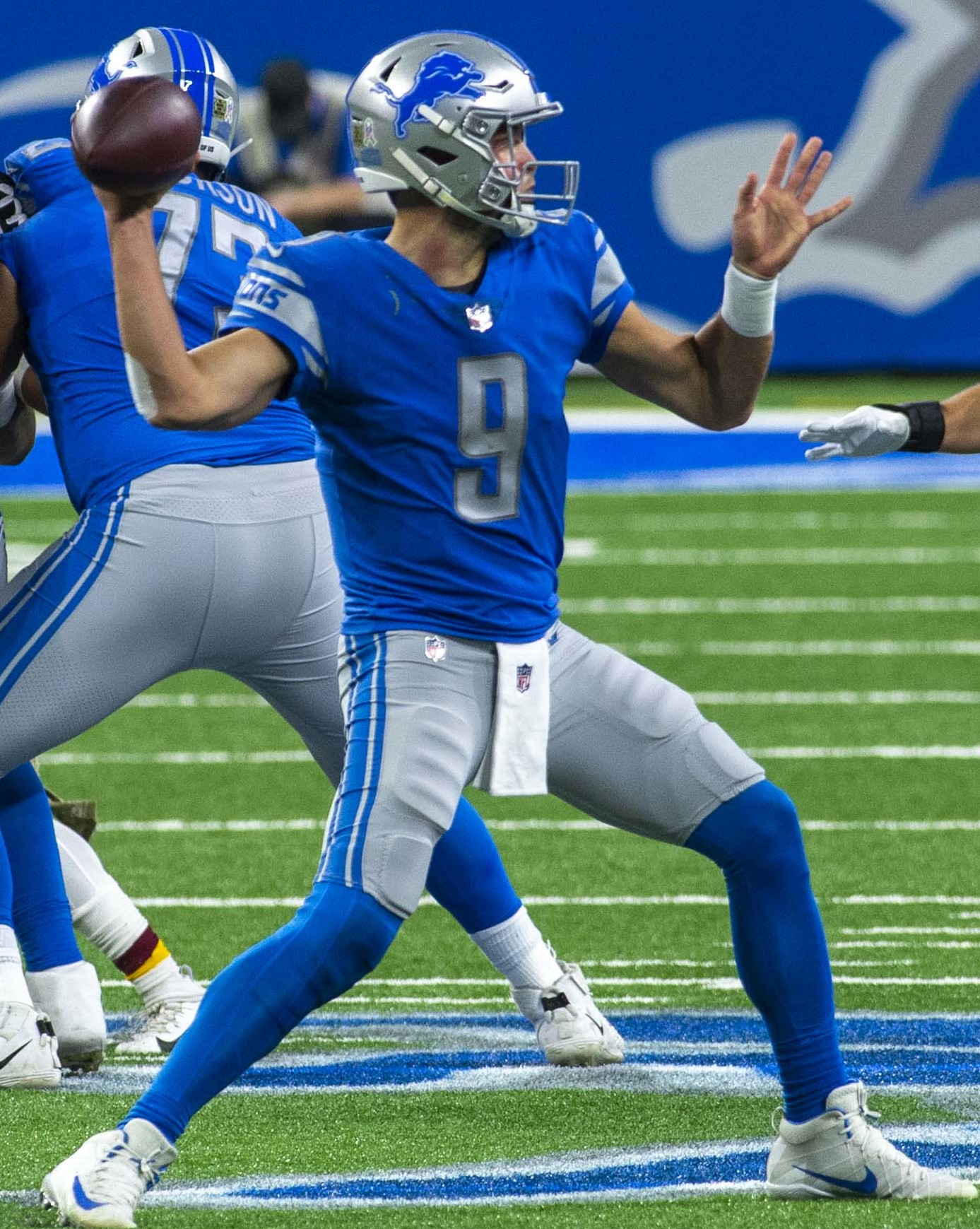
Matthew Stafford was selected first overall in the 2009 NFL draft. He spent 13 seasons with the team, during which he time he set various NFL records, including being the fastest to 30,000, 40,000, and 50,000 passing yards, being the first player to complete 60% or more of all passes in each game in a season, most fourth quarterback comebacks in a season, and the most game winning drives in a season. He was also the 2010 AP NFL Comeback Player of the Year.

The Detroit Lions are a professional American football team based in Detroit, Michigan. The Lions compete in the National Football League (NFL) as a member of the North Division of the National Football Conference. The franchise was founded in Portsmouth, Ohio, as the Portsmouth Spartans and joined the NFL on July 12, 1930. After being purchased by George A. Richards in 1934, the franchise was relocated to Detroit and renamed to the Detroit Lions in reference to the city's Major League Baseball franchise, the Detroit Tigers. The team plays its home games at Ford Field in Downtown Detroit.

The NFL draft, officially known as the "NFL Annual Player Selection Meeting", is an annual event which serves as the league's most common source of player recruitment. The draft order is determined based on the previous season's standings; the teams with the worst win–loss records receive the earliest picks. Teams that qualified for the NFL playoffs select after non-qualifiers, and their order depends on how far they advanced, using their regular season record as a tie-breaker. The final two selections in the first round are reserved for the Super Bowl runner-up and champion. Draft picks are tradable and players or other picks can be acquired with them.

In 1936, the league introduced the NFL draft after team owners voted on it in 1935. The intention of the draft is to make the NFL more competitive, as some teams had an advantage in signing players. From 1947 through 1958 the NFL designated the first overall selection as a "bonus" or "lottery pick". The pick was awarded by a random draw and the winner who received the "bonus pick" forfeited its selection in the final round of the draft and became ineligible for future draws. The system was abolished prior to the 1959 NFL draft, as all twelve teams in the league at the time had received a bonus choice.

Since the first draft, the Lions have selected 94 players in the first round. The team's first-round pick in the inaugural NFL draft was Sid Wagner, a guard from Michigan State; he was the 8th overall selection. The Lions have held the first overall pick four times and selected Frank Sinkwich in 1943, Leon Hart in 1950, Billy Sims in 1980, and Matthew Stafford in 2009. In the most recent draft, held in 2026, the Lions selected Clemson offensive tackle Blake Miller.

The Lions did not draft a player in the first round on seven occasions. Seven of the team's first-round picks—Otto Graham, Calvin Johnson, Alex Karras, Johnny Robinson, Barry Sanders, Y. A. Tittle, and Alex Wojciechowicz—have been elected to the Pro Football Hall of Fame; two of these, Graham and Tittle, chose not to play for the Lions and joined the All-America Football Conference (AAFC) instead. The Lions also used three first-round picks in the 1960s to select players–Pete Beathard, John Hadl, and Johnny Robinson–who chose to sign with the NFL's pre-merger direct competitor, the American Football League (AFL) instead.

== Player selections ==
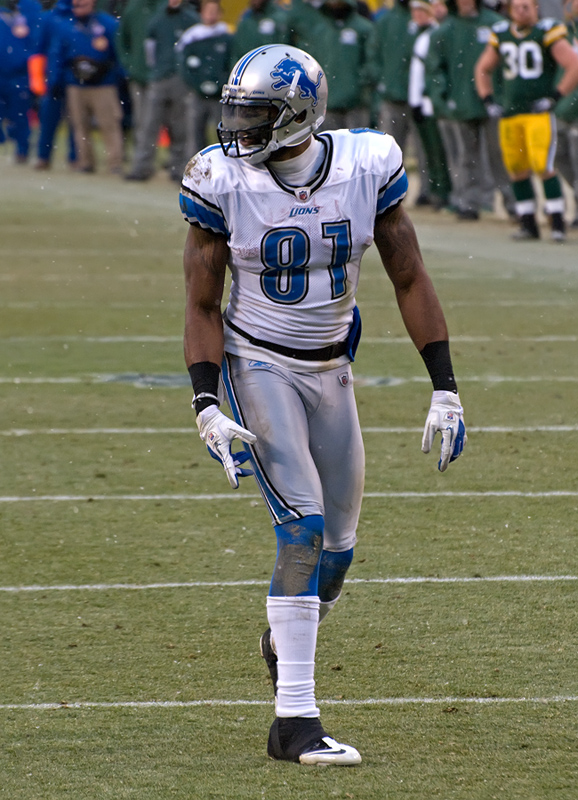
Wide receiver Calvin Johnson was drafted second overall in the 2007 NFL draft. He spent his entire nine-year career with the Lions, during which time he was a four-time All-Pro, six-time Pro Bowler, and set the single-season record for most receiving yards in a season. After retiring, Johnson was selected to the 2010s All-Decade Team and became a first-ballot Pro Football Hall of Famer.

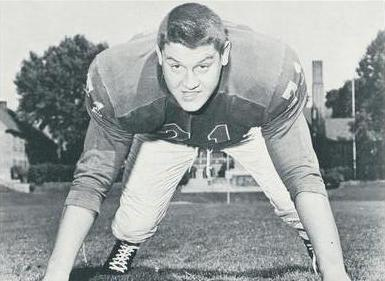
Defensive tackle Alex Karras was drafted with the 10th overall pick of the 1958 NFL draft and played 11 seasons for the Lions. During his time with the team he was a nine-time All-Pro and four-time Pro Bowler. A member of the 1960s All-Decade Team, he was inducted into the Pro Football Hall of Fame in 2020.

Key
| Symbol | Meaning |
|---|---|
| † | Inducted into the Pro Football Hall of Fame |
| * | Selected number one overall |

Position abbreviations
| C | Center |
| CB | Cornerback |
| DB | Defensive back |
| DE | Defensive end |
| DT | Defensive tackle |
| E | End |
| FB | Fullback |
| G | Guard |
| HB | Halfback |
| LB | Linebacker |
| QB | Quarterback |
| RB | Running back |
| S | Safety |
| T | Tackle |
| TE | Tight end |
| WB | Wingback |
| WR | Wide receiver |

Detroit Lions first-round draft picks by season
| Season | Pick | Player | Position | College | Notes |
|---|---|---|---|---|---|
| 1936 | 8 | Sid Wagner | G | Michigan State | |
| 1937 | 7 | Lloyd Cardwell | HB | Nebraska | |
| 1938 | 6 | Alex Wojciechowicz† | C | Fordham | |
| 1939 | 7 | John Pingel | HB | Michigan State | |
| 1940 | 6 | Doyle Nave | QB | USC | Declined to play football |
| 1941 | 5 | Jim Thomason | WB | Texas A&M | |
| 1942 | 5 | Bob Westfall | FB | Michigan | |
| 1943 | 1 | Frank Sinkwich* | RB | Georgia | |
| 1944 | 4 | Otto Graham† | QB | Northwestern | Did not sign with team (Note: Quarterback Otto Graham could not play due to being enlisted with the Navy but signed a contract in 1945 to play for the AAFC's Cleveland Browns once discharged.) |
| 1945 | 6 | Frank Szymanski | C | Notre Dame | |
| 1946 | 8 | Bill Dellastatious | HB | Missouri | Never played in the NFL (Note: Halfback Bill Dellastatious did not sign with the Lions. He chose to pursue coaching instead of playing.) |
| 1947 | 2 | Glenn Davis | HB | Army | Player rights traded to Los Angeles Rams (Note: Detroit traded the player rights for halfback Glenn Davis to the Los Angeles Rams in exchange for their 1948 first- and third-round selections (Nos. 6 and 17 overall). Davis did not play in the NFL until 1950 due to military service obligations.) |
| 1948 | 6 | Y. A. Tittle† | QB | LSU | Original pick traded to Pittsburgh Steelers. (Note: Detroit traded their 1948 first-round selection (No. 3 overall), halfbacks Bob Cifers and Paul White, and the rights to Bob Chappuis to the Pittsburgh Steelers for halfback Bill Dudley.) Pick received in trade with Los Angeles Rams. Signed with the Baltimore Colts of the AAFC. |
| 1949 | 2 | John Rauch | QB | Georgia | Player rights traded to New York Yanks (Note: Detroit traded the rights for John Rauch to the New York Yanks in exchange for the rights to Doak Walker. Detroit would later have to give up an additional second-round pick in the 1950 draft due to a conflicting claim for Walker with the Cleveland Browns.) |
| 1950 | 1 | Leon Hart* | E | Notre Dame | Lottery bonus pick |
| 1950 | 5 | Joe Watson | C | Rice | |
| 1951 | No pick | | | | Pick traded to Philadelphia Eagles (Note: Detroit traded their 1951 first-round selection (No. 8 overall) to the Philadelphia Eagles in exchange for Lindy Pearson.) |
| 1952 | No pick | | | | Pick traded to Cleveland Browns (Note: Detroit traded their 1952 first- and sixteenth-round selections (Nos. 9 and 189 overall), as well as Charley Schroll, Ed Wood, and cash to the Cleveland Browns for Jim Martin, Ed Pasky, Tom Lucia, Lowell Tew, and Dave Rakestraw.) |
| 1953 | 13 | Harley Sewell | G | Texas | |
| 1954 | 13 | Dick Chapman | T | Rice | Did not sign with team (Note: Tackle Dick Chappus elected to return to Rice University in hopes of becoming an atomic scientist.) |
| 1955 | 12 | Dave Middleton | E | Auburn | |
| 1956 | 3 | Howard Cassady | HB | Ohio State | |
| 1957 | 12 | Bill Glass | G | Baylor | |
| 1958 | 10 | Alex Karras† | DT | Iowa | |
| 1959 | 6 | Nick Pietrosante | FB | Notre Dame | |
| 1960 | 3 | Johnny Robinson† | DB | LSU | Signed for the AFL's Dallas Texans instead |
| 1961 | No pick | | | | Pick traded to Cleveland Browns (Note: Detroit traded their 1961 first-round selection (No. 10 overall) and linebacker Bob Long to the Cleveland Browns in exchange for quarterback Jim Ninowski.) |
| 1962 | 10 | John Hadl | RB | Kansas | Signed for the AFL's San Diego Chargers instead |
| 1963 | 12 | Daryl Sanders | T | Ohio State | |
| 1964 | 5 | Pete Beathard | QB | USC | Signed for the AFL's Kansas City Chiefs instead |
| 1965 | 11 | Tom Nowatzke | FB | Indiana | |
| 1966 | No pick | | | | Pick forfeited to Green Bay Packers (Note: Detroit traded their 1966 first-round selection (No. 8 overall) to the Green Bay Packers for the right to sign free agent Ron Kramer.) |
| 1967 | 7 | Mel Farr | RB | UCLA | |
| 1968 | 11 | Greg Landry | QB | UMass | |
| 1968 | 24 | Earl McCullouch | WR | USC | Pick received in trade with Los Angeles Rams (Note: Detroit traded defensive tackle Roger Brown to the Los Angeles Rams in exchange for their 1968 first- and second-round selections (Nos. 24 and 74 overall) as well as their 1969 second-round selection (No. 47 overall).) |
| 1969 | No pick | | | | Pick traded to Los Angeles Rams (Note: Detroit traded their 1969 first-round selection (No. 8 overall), punter and wide receiver Pat Studstill, running back Tom Watkins, and quarterback Milt Plum to the Los Angeles Rams in exchange for quarterback Bill Munson.) |
| 1970 | 19 | Steve Owens | RB | Oklahoma | |
| 1971 | 21 | Bob Bell | DT | Cincinnati | |
| 1972 | 16 | Herb Orvis | DT | Colorado | |
| 1973 | 17 | Ernie Price | DE | Texas A&I | Moved up draft order in trade with Chicago Bears (Note: Detroit traded their 1973 first-round selection (No. 19 overall) and tight end Craig Cotton to the Chicago Bears in exchange for their 1973 first- and third-round selections (Nos. 17 and 58 overall).) |
| 1974 | 8 | Ed O'Neil | LB | Penn State | Moved up draft order in trade with New Orleans Saints (Note: Detroit traded their 1974 first-round selection (No. 13 overall) and center Dave Thompson to the New Orleans Saints in exchange for their 1974 first-round selection (No. 8 overall) and 1975 sixth-round selection (No. 138 overall).) |
| 1975 | 13 | Lynn Boden | G | South Dakota State | |
| 1976 | 10 | James Hunter | DB | Grambling State | Pick received from Los Angeles Rams. (Note: Detroit received a 1976 first-round selection (No. 8 overall) from the Los Angeles Rams as compensation for free agent wide receiver Ron Jessie.) Moved down draft order in trade with Chicago Bears. (Note: Detroit traded a 1976 first-round selection (No. 8 overall, received from Los Angeles Rams) to the Chicago Bears in exchange for their 1976 first- and third-round selections (Nos. 10 and 68 overall).) |
| 1976 | 16 | Lawrence Gaines | RB | Wyoming | |
| 1977 | No pick | | | | Pick traded to Buffalo Bills (Note: Detroit traded their 1977 first-round selection (No. 12 overall) to the Buffalo Bills in exchange for wide receiver J. D. Hill.) |
| 1978 | 11 | Luther Bradley | DB | Notre Dame | |
| 1979 | 10 | Keith Dorney | T | Penn State | |
| 1980 | 1 | Billy Sims* | RB | Oklahoma | |
| 1981 | 16 | Mark Nichols | WR | San Jose State | |
| 1982 | 15 | Jimmy Williams | LB | Nebraska | |
| 1983 | 13 | James Jones | FB | Florida | |
| 1984 | 20 | David Lewis | TE | California | |
| 1985 | 6 | Lomas Brown | T | Florida | |
| 1986 | 12 | Chuck Long | QB | Iowa | |
| 1987 | 7 | Reggie Rogers | DT | Washington | |
| 1988 | 3 | Bennie Blades | DB | Miami | Moved down draft order in trade with Kansas City Chiefs (Note: Detroit traded their 1988 first-round selection (No. 2 overall) to the Kansas City Chiefs in exchange for their 1988 first- and second-round selections (Nos. 3 and 29 overall).) |
| 1989 | 3 | Barry Sanders† | RB | Oklahoma State | |
| 1990 | 7 | Andre Ware | QB | Houston | |
| 1991 | 10 | Herman Moore | WR | Virginia | |
| 1992 | 26 | Robert Porcher | DE | South Carolina State | |
| 1993 | No pick | | | | Pick traded to New Orleans Saints (Note: Detroit traded their 1993 first- and fourth-round selections (Nos. 8 and 89 overall) to the New Orleans Saints in exchange for linebacker Pat Swilling.) |
| 1994 | 21 | Johnnie Morton | WR | USC | |
| 1995 | 20 | Luther Elliss | DT | Utah | |
| 1996 | 17 | Reggie Brown | LB | Texas A&M | Moved up draft order in trade with Seattle Seahawks (Note: During the 1995 NFL draft, Detroit traded their 1995 second-round selection (No. 51 overall) to the San Diego Chargers in exchange for their 1996 first-round selection (No. 21 overall). Prior to the 1996 NFL draft, Detroit traded San Diego's first-round selection (No. 21 overall) and their own 1996 third-round selection (No. 91 overall) to the Seattle Seahawks in exchange for their 1996 first-round selection (No. 17 overall).) |
| 1996 | 23 | Jeff Hartings | G | Penn State | |
| 1997 | 5 | Bryant Westbrook | DB | Texas | |
| 1998 | 20 | Terry Fair | DB | Tennessee | |
| 1999 | 9 | Chris Claiborne | LB | USC | |
| 1999 | 27 | Aaron Gibson | T | Wisconsin | Moved up draft order in trade with Miami Dolphins (Note: Detroit traded their 1999 second-, third-, and fourth-round selection (Nos. 39, 70, and 142 overall) to the Miami Dolphins in exchange for their 1999 first-round selection (No. 27 overall).) |
| 2000 | 20 | Stockar McDougle | T | Oklahoma | |
| 2001 | 18 | Jeff Backus | T | Michigan | |
| 2002 | 3 | Joey Harrington | QB | Oregon | |
| 2003 | 2 | Charles Rogers | WR | Michigan State | |
| 2004 | 7 | Roy Williams | WR | Texas | Moved down draft order in trade with Cleveland Browns (Note: Detroit traded their 2004 first-round selection (No. 6 overall) to the Cleveland Browns in exchange for their 2004 first- and second-round selections (Nos. 7 and 37 overall).) |
| 2004 | 30 | Kevin Jones | RB | Virginia Tech | Moved up draft order in trade with Kansas City Chiefs (Note: Detroit traded their 2004 second- and fourth-round selections (Nos. 36 and 105 overall) Kansas City Chiefs in exchange for their 2004 first-round selection (No. 30 overall).) |
| 2005 | 10 | Mike Williams | WR | USC | |
| 2006 | 9 | Ernie Sims | LB | Florida State | |
| 2007 | 2 | Calvin Johnson† | WR | Georgia Tech | |
| 2008 | 17 | Gosder Cherilus | T | Boston College | Moved down draft order in trade with Kansas City Chiefs (Note: Detroit traded their 2008 first- and third-round selections (Nos. 15 and 76 overall) to the Kansas City Chiefs in exchange for their 2008 first-, third-, and fifth-round selections (Nos. 17, 66, and 136 overall).) |
| 2009 | 1 | Matthew Stafford* | QB | Georgia | |
| 2009 | 20 | Brandon Pettigrew | TE | Oklahoma State | Pick received in trade with Dallas Cowboys (Note: Detroit traded their 2009 seventh-round selection (No. 210 overall) and wide receiver Roy Williams to the Dallas Cowboys in exchange for their 2009 first-, third-, and sixth-round selections (Nos. 20, 82, and 192 overall).) |
| 2010 | 2 | Ndamukong Suh | DT | Nebraska | |
| 2010 | 30 | Jahvid Best | RB | California | Moved up draft order in trade with Minnesota Vikings (Note: Detroit traded their 2010 second-, fourth-, and seventh-round selections (Nos. 34, 100, and 214 overall) to the Minnesota Vikings in exchange for their 2010 first- and fourth-round selections (Nos. 30 and 128 overall).) |
| 2011 | 13 | Nick Fairley | DT | Auburn | |
| 2012 | 23 | Riley Reiff | T | Iowa | |
| 2013 | 5 | Ezekiel Ansah | DE | BYU | |
| 2014 | 10 | Eric Ebron | TE | North Carolina | |
| 2015 | 28 | Laken Tomlinson | G | Duke | Moved down draft order in trade with Denver Broncos (Note: Detroit traded their 2015 first-round selection (No. 23 overall) to the Denver Broncos in exchange for their 2015 first- and fifth-round selections (Nos. 28 and 143 overall), their 2016 fifth-round selection (No. 169 overall), and guard Manny Ramirez.) |
| 2016 | 16 | Taylor Decker | T | Ohio State | |
| 2017 | 21 | Jarrad Davis | LB | Florida | |
| 2018 | 20 | Frank Ragnow | C | Arkansas | |
| 2019 | 8 | T. J. Hockenson | TE | Iowa | |
| 2020 | 3 | Jeff Okudah | CB | Ohio State | |
| 2021 | 7 | Penei Sewell | T | Oregon | |
| 2022 | 2 | Aidan Hutchinson | DE | Michigan | |
| 2022 | 12 | Jameson Williams | WR | Alabama | Moved up draft order in trade with Minnesota Vikings (Note: Detroit traded a 2022 first- (received from Los Angeles Rams in Matthew Stafford trade), (Note: Detroit traded quarterback Matthew Stafford to the Los Angeles Rams for a 2022 first-round selection (No. 32 overall), a 2023 first-round selection (No. 6 overall), a 2021 third-round selection (No. 101 overall), and quarterback Jared Goff.) second-, and third-round selections (Nos. 32, 34, and 66 overall) to the Minnesota Vikings in exchange for their 2022 first- and second-round selections (Nos. 12 and 46 overall).) |
| 2023 | 12 | Jahmyr Gibbs | RB | Alabama | Moved down draft order in trade with Arizona Cardinals (Note: Detroit traded a 2023 first- (received from Los Angeles Rams in Matthew Stafford trade) and third-round selection (Nos. 6 and 81 overall) to the Arizona Cardinals in exchange for their 2023 first-, second-, and fifth-round selections (Nos. 12, 34, and 168 overall).) |
| 2023 | 18 | Jack Campbell | LB | Iowa | |
| 2024 | 24 | Terrion Arnold | CB | Alabama | Moved up draft order in trade with Dallas Cowboys (Note: Detroit traded their 2024 first- and third-round selections (Nos. 29 and 73 overall) to the Dallas Cowboys in exchange for their 2024 first-round selection (No. 24 overall) and 2025 seventh-round selection (no. yet to be determined).) |
| 2025 | 28 | Tyleik Williams | DT | Ohio State | |
| 2026 | 17 | Blake Miller | OT | Clemson | |

== See also ==
- History of the Detroit Lions
- List of Detroit Lions seasons
