= 1945 All-Big Six Conference football team =

The 1945 All-Big Six Conference football team consists of American football players chosen by various organizations for All-Big Six Conference teams for the 1945 college football season. The selectors for the 1945 season included the Associated Press (AP) and the United Press (UP).

== All-Big Six selections ==
=== Backs ===
- Leonard Brown, Missouri (AP-1; UP-1)
- Richard Howard, Iowa State (AP-1; UP-1)
- John West, Oklahoma (AP-1; UP-1)
- Jack Venable, Oklahoma (AP-1; UP-1)
- Alvin Bandy, Kansas State (AP-2; UP-2)
- Robert Hopkins, Missouri (AP-2; UP-2)
- Gene Phelps, Iowa State (AP-2; UP-2)
- Gerald Moore, Nebraska (AP-2; UP-2)

=== Ends ===
- David Schmidt, Kansas (AP-1; UP-1)
- Roland Oakes, Missouri (AP-1; UP-2)
- Omer Burgert, Oklahoma (AP-2; UP-1)
- Aubrey McCall, Oklahoma (AP-2; UP-2)

=== Tackles ===
- Jim Kekeris, Missouri (AP-1; UP-1)
- Thomas Tallchief, Oklahoma (AP-1; UP-1)
- Richard Cole, Iowa State (AP-2; UP-2)
- John Sedlacek, Nebraska (AP-2)
- Robert Rodenhamer, Oklahoma (UP-2)
- Elmer Otto Friday, Oklahoma (UP-2)

=== Guards ===
- Jack Fathauer, Iowa State (AP-1; UP-1)
- Thurman Tigart, Oklahoma (AP-1)
- Robert Eigelberger, Missouri (AP-2; UP-1)
- Russell Hardin, Kansas State (AP-2)
- Donald Tillman, Oklahoma (UP-2)

=== Centers ===
- Ralph Stewart, Missouri (AP-1; UP-1)
- James Riding, Iowa State (AP-2; UP-2)

== Key ==
AP = Associated Press

UP = United Press

== See also ==
- 1945 College Football All-America Team
