= 1940 All-Southwest Conference football team =

American college football all-star team

The 1940 All-Southwest Conference football team consists of American football players chosen by various organizations for All-Southwest Conference teams for the 1940 college football season. The selectors for the 1940 season included the Associated Press (AP) and United Press (UP).

== All Southwest selections ==
=== Backs ===
- Pete Layden, Texas (AP-1, UP-1 [hb])
- Jim Thomason, Texas A&M (AP-1, UP-1 [hb])
- Pres Johnston, SMU (AP-1, UP-1 [qb])
- John Kimbrough, Texas A&M (AP-1, UP-1 [fb])
- Bob Brumley, Rice (AP-2, UP-2 [fb])
- Marion Pugh, Texas A&M (AP-2, UP-2 [hb])
- Jack Crain, Texas (AP-2, UP-2 [hb])
- William Conatser, Texas A&M (AP-2)
- Kyle Gillespie, TCU (UP-2 [qb])

=== Ends ===
- Jack Russell, Baylor (AP-1, UP-1)
- James Sterling, Texas A&M (AP-1, UP-2)
- Phil Roach, TCU (AP-2, UP-1)
- Malcolm Kutner, Texas (AP-2)
- Red Hickey, Arkansas (UP-2)

=== Tackles ===
- Ernie Pannell, Texas A&M (AP-1, UP-1)
- Fred Hartman, Rice (AP-1, UP-1)
- Joe Pasqua, SMU (AP-2)
- Jack Anderson, Baylor (AP-2, UP-2)
- Chipp Routt, Texas A&M (UP-2)

=== Guards ===
- Marshall Robnett, Texas A&M (AP-1, UP-1)
- Bobby Sherrod, TCU (AP-1, UP-1)
- Charles Henke, Texas A&M (AP-2, UP-2)
- Chal Daniel, Texas (AP-2, UP-2)

=== Centers ===
- Ken Whitlow, Rice (AP-1, UP-1)
- Robert Nelson, Baylor (AP-2, UP-2)

== Key ==
AP = Associated Press UP - United Press

== See also ==
- 1940 College Football All-America Team
