= Brandon Copeland (linebacker) =

American football player (born 1991)

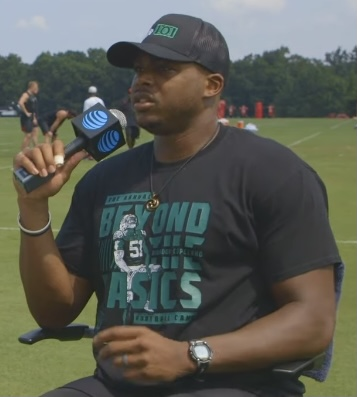
- Copeland with the Atlanta Falcons in 2021

No. 95, 51, 52, 49
- Position: Linebacker

Personal information
- Born: July 2, 1991 (age 35); Sykesville, Maryland, U.S.
- Listed height: 6 ft 3 in (1.91 m)
- Listed weight: 263 lb (119 kg)

Career information
- High school: Gilman School (Baltimore, Maryland)
- College: Penn
- NFL draft: 2013: undrafted

Career history
- Baltimore Ravens (2013)*; Tennessee Titans (2013–2014)*; Orlando Predators (2015)*; Detroit Lions (2015–2017); New York Jets (2018–2019); New England Patriots (2020); Atlanta Falcons (2021); Baltimore Ravens (2022)
- * Offseason or practice squad member only

Career NFL statistics
- Total tackles: 163
- Sacks: 8.0
- Forced fumbles: 2
- Fumble recoveries: 0
- Interceptions: 0
- Pass deflections: 6
- Stats at Pro Football Reference

Brandon Matthew Copeland (born July 2, 1991) is an American former professional football player who was a linebacker for 10 seasons in the National Football League (NFL). He was signed by the Baltimore Ravens as an undrafted free agent in 2013 and also played for the Tennessee Titans, Detroit Lions, New York Jets, New England Patriots, and Atlanta Falcons. He played college football for the Penn Quakers.

== Early life ==
Copeland is from Sykesville, Maryland. He is the grandson of former Baltimore Colts defensive end Roy Hilton. Copeland graduated from the Gilman School where he played 3 sports: football, basketball and track. During his senior year of high school, Copeland was awarded the position of team captain.

He was on the championship squad at the 2006 Maryland Interscholastic Athletic Association. He received the National Football Foundation Scholar Athlete of the Year Award in 2008 and was an Academic All-State team honoree the same year.

== College career ==
Copeland attended the University of Pennsylvania where he was the captain of the 2012 Ivy League championship winning team. He graduated from the Wharton School with a Bachelor of Science in economics.

== Professional career ==
Pre-draft measurables
Height	Weight	Arm length	Hand span	40-yard dash	10-yard split	20-yard split	20-yard shuttle	Three-cone drill	Vertical jump	Broad jump	Bench press
6 ft 2 1/8 in (1.88 m)	265 lb (120 kg)	31 3/4 in (0.81 m)	8 5/8 in (0.22 m)	4.72 s	1.62 s	2.65 s	4.49 s	7.29 s	32.5 in (0.83 m)	10 ft 2 in (3.10 m)	30 reps
All values from Pro Day

=== Baltimore Ravens ===
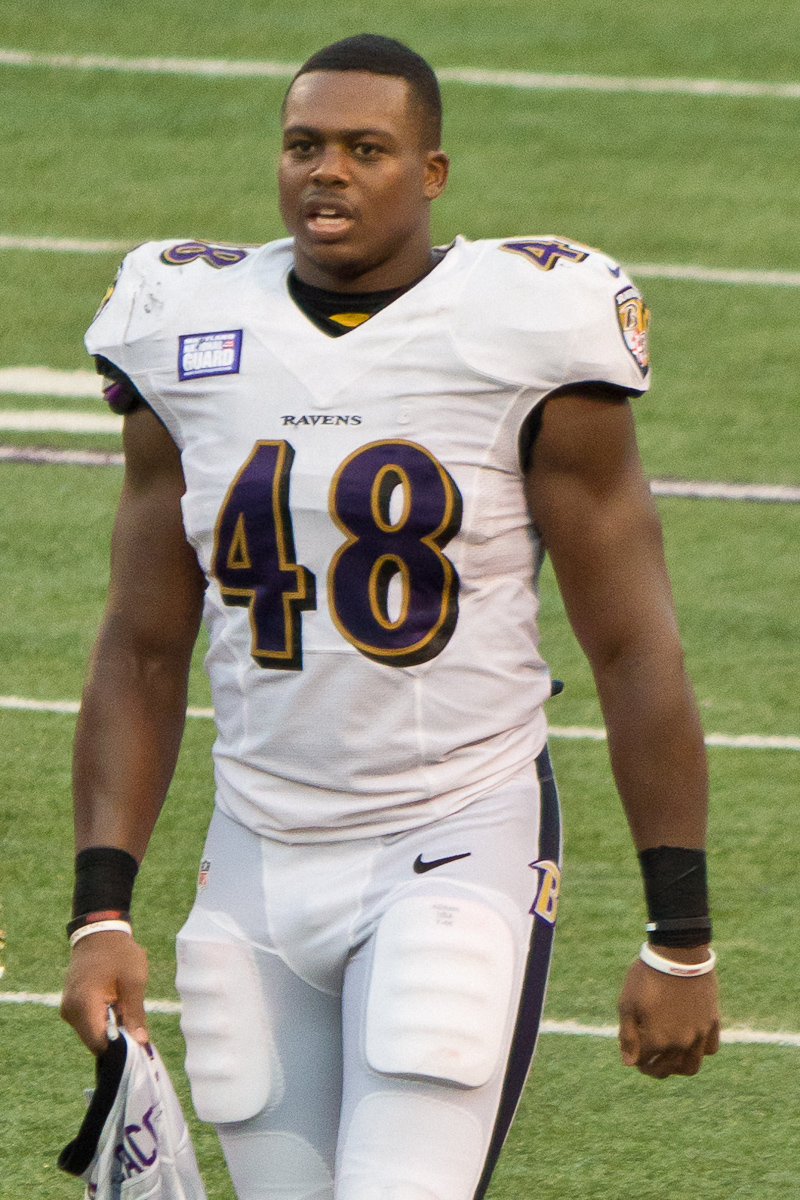
Copeland with the Baltimore Ravens in 2013

On April 27, 2013, Copeland signed with the Baltimore Ravens as an undrafted free agent. He was waived on August 31.

=== Tennessee Titans ===
Copeland was signed to the Tennessee Titans practice squad on October 8, 2013. He was released from the Titans practice squad on November 5, and re-signed to the practice squad on November 12. Copeland signed with Tennessee to a future contract on December 31.

=== Orlando Predators ===
On February 13, 2015, Copeland was assigned to the Orlando Predators of the Arena Football League (AFL). On March 6, 2015, Copeland was placed on the refused to report list by the Predators. On April 7, 2015, Copeland was placed on other league exempt list by the Predators.

=== Detroit Lions ===
On March 22, 2015, Copeland participated in the NFL Veterans Combine. On April 7, Copeland signed a one-year contract with the Detroit Lions. After participating in the combine, he and Ifeanyi Momah were the only participants to be offered contracts.

In 2017, Copeland suffered a torn pectoral in the Lions' first preseason game and was ruled out for the season.

=== New York Jets ===
On March 19, 2018, Copeland signed with the New York Jets. He played in 16 games with 10 starts, recording 35 combined tackles, and five sacks.

On March 25, 2019, Copeland re-signed with the Jets. He was suspended for the first four games of the 2019 season by violating the league's policy on performance-enhancing substances. He was reinstated from the suspension on October 7 and activated prior to Week 6. In Week 9 against the Miami Dolphins, Copeland recorded a team-high 9 tackles and sacked Ryan Fitzpatrick once in the 18–26 loss.

=== New England Patriots ===
On March 25, 2020, Copeland signed a $1.1 million contract with the New England Patriots. On October 28, he was placed on injured reserve after suffering a torn pectoral in Week 7.

=== Atlanta Falcons ===
On March 19, 2021, Copeland signed a one-year contract with the Atlanta Falcons. On September 11, he was waived by the Falcons, but was re-signed two days later.

=== Baltimore Ravens (second stint) ===
On September 21, 2022, Copeland signed with the Baltimore Ravens practice squad. He was released from the Ravens on October 18.

=== Retirement ===
On August 21, 2023, Copeland announced his retirement from the NFL.

== Personal life ==
Copeland interned at the investment bank UBS over two summers during college and has since returned to Penn to teach a financial literacy seminar with Dr. Brian Peterson, the director of Penn's Makuu Black Cultural Center. He has also appeared on the Netflix series Buy My House in 2022.
