= 1970 All-Big Eight Conference football team =

American all-star college football team

The 1970 All-Big Eight Conference football team consists of American football players chosen by various organizations for All-Big Eight Conference teams for the 1970 NCAA University Division football season. The selectors for the 1970 season included the Associated Press (AP) and United Press International (UPI).

== Offensive selections ==
=== Ends ===
- Hermann Eben, Oklahoma State (AP-1; UPI-1)
- Otto Stowe, Iowa State (AP-1; UPI-1)
- Dick Graham, Oklahoma State (UPI-2)
- Guy Ingles, Nebraska (UPI-2)

=== Tackles ===
- Larron Jackson, Missouri (AP-1; UPI-1)
- Bob Newton, Nebraska (AP-1; UPI-1)
- Wally Winter, Nebraska (UPI-2)

=== Guards ===
- Dennis Havig, Colorado (AP-1; UPI-1)
- Steve Lawson, Kansas (AP-1; UPI-2)
- Donnie McGhee, Nebraska (UPI-1)
- Mickey Kephart, Missouri (UPI-2)
- Bobby Childs, Kansas (UPI-2)

=== Centers ===
- Don Popplewell, Colorado (AP-1; UPI-1)
- Bob Wilson, Missouri (UPI-2)

=== Quarterbacks ===
- Lynn Dickey, Kansas State (AP-1; UPI-1)
- Van Brownson, Nebraska (UPI-2)
- Jerry Tagge, Nebraska (UPI-2)

=== Halfbacks ===
- Joe Wylie, Oklahoma (AP-1; UPI-1)
- Joe Orduna, Nebraska (AP-1; UPI-1)
- Johnny Rodgers, Nebraska (UPI-2)
- Joe Moore, Missouri (UPI-2)

=== Fullbacks ===
- John Riggins, Kansas (AP-1; UPI-1)

== Defensive selections ==
=== Defensive ends ===
- Herb Orvis, Colorado (AP-1; UPI-1)
- Mike Kuhn, Kansas State (AP-1; UPI-1)
- Mike Bennett, Missouri (UPI-2)
- Willie Harper, Nebraska (UPI-2)

=== Defensive tackles ===
- Dave Walline, Nebraska (AP-1; UPI-1)
- Ron Yankowski, Kansas State (AP-1; UPI-1)
- Kevin Grady, Oklahoma (UPI-2)
- Rocky Wallace, Missouri (UPI-2)

=== Middle guards ===
- Ed Periard, Nebraska (AP-1; UPI-1)

=== Linebackers ===
- Jerry Murtaugh, Nebraska (AP-1; UPI-1)
- Oscar Gibson, Kansas State (AP-1; UPI-1)
- Steve Aycock, Oklahoma (AP-1; UPI-1)
- Adam Vital, Missouri (UPI-2)
- Phil Irwin, Colorado (UPI-2)
- Nip Weisenfels, Missouri (UPI-2)

=== Defensive backs ===
- Clarence Scott, Kansas State (AP-1; UPI-1)
- Tony Washington, Iowa State (AP-1; UPI-1)
- Monty Johnson, Oklahoma (AP-1; UPI-2)
- Bill Kosch, Nebraska (UPI-1)
- Pat Murphy, Colorado (UPI-2)
- Mike Kolich, Kansas State (UPI-2)
- Lee Stover, Oklahoma State (UPI-2)

== Key ==
AP = Associated Press

UPI = United Press International

== See also ==
- 1970 College Football All-America Team
