= Bob Brumley =

American football player (1919–2009)

- Brumley (photograph from Rio Grande Valley Sports Hall of Fame)

No. 32
- Position: Back

Personal information
- Born: September 24, 1919; Edinburg, Texas, U.S.
- Died: March 31, 2009 (aged 89); San Antonio, Texas, U.S.
- Listed height: 6 ft 0 in (1.83 m)
- Listed weight: 200 lb (91 kg)

Career information
- College: Rice; Oklahoma
- NFL draft: 1942: 8th round, 62nd overall pick

Career history
- Detroit Lions (1945)

Awards and highlights
- First-team All-Big Six (1943); 2× Second-team All-SWC (1940, 1941)

Career NFL statistics
- Rushing yards: 18
- Rushing average: 3.6
- Receptions: 2
- Receiving yards: 27
- Stats at Pro Football Reference

Robert Lee Brumley (September 24, 1919 – March 31, 2009) was an American professional football player.

Born in Edinburg, Texas, Roberson played college football for Rice and Oklahoma. He was the leading scorer in the Big Six Conference in 1943 and was selected by the United Press as a first-team back on the 1943 All-Big Six Conference football team. He also served in the United States Navy during World War II aboard the USS Cabot. After the war, he played professional football in the National Football League (NFL) as a back for the Detroit Lions. He appeared in one NFL game during the 1945 season. He died on 31 March 2009, in San Antonio, Texas, at the age of 89, and was buried in Castroville Community Cemetery, Castroville, Texas.
