= Ken Whitlow =

American football player (1917–1969)

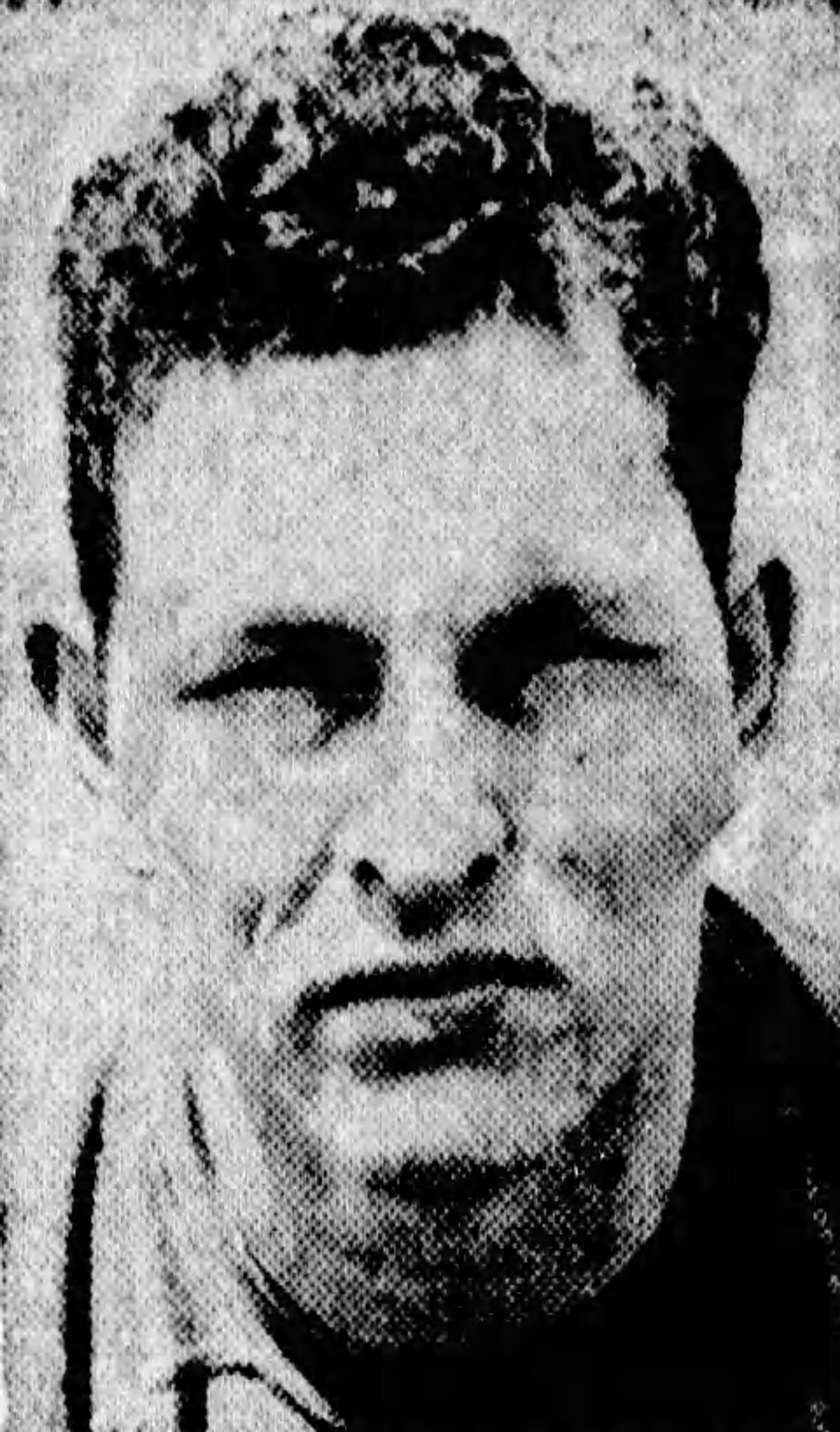
- Ken Whitlow (1940)

No. 22
- Positions: Center, linebacker

Personal information
- Born: November 30, 1917; Wichita Falls, Texas, U.S.
- Died: November 12, 1969 (aged 51); Houston, Texas, U.S.
- Listed height: 6 ft 1 in (1.85 m)
- Listed weight: 190 lb (86 kg)

Career information
- High school: Wichita Falls
- College: Rice (1937-1940)
- NFL draft: 1941: 22nd round, 199th overall pick

Career history
- Miami Seahawks (1946)

Awards and highlights
- First-team All-SWC (1940); Second-team All-SWC (1939)

Career AAFC statistics
- Games played: 13
- Games started: 7
- Interceptions: 2
- Stats at Pro Football Reference

Kenneth Moody "Tuffy" Whitlow (November 30, 1917 – November 12, 1969) was an American professional football center.

Whitlow was born in Wichita Falls, Texas in 1917 and attended Wichita Falls High School. He played college football for Rice. He was selected by the Associated Press as the first-team center on the 1940 All-Southwest Conference football team. He was also the captain of the southern team for the 1940 North–South Shrine Game.

He played professional football in the All-America Football Conference for the Miami Seahawks in 1946. He appeared in a total of 13 professional games, seven of them as a starter.

He died in 1969 in Houston.
