= Rock Perdoni =

American gridiron football player (1947–2026)

No. 64, 61, 63
- Position: Tackle

Personal information
- Born: December 10, 1947; Gazzola, Italy
- Died: June 15, 2026 (aged 78); Newborn, Georgia, U.S.
- Listed height: 5 ft 11 in (1.80 m)
- Listed weight: 278 lb (126 kg)

Career information
- High school: Wellesley (Wellesley, Massachusetts, U.S.)
- College: Georgia Tech

Career history
- 1971: Winnipeg Blue Bombers
- 1971: Hamilton Tiger-Cats
- 1972: Edmonton Eskimos
- 1972–1973: Saskatchewan Roughriders

Awards and highlights
- Consensus All-American (1970); Second-team All-American (1969); Sun Bowl Most Valuable Player (1970); Nils V. "Swede" Nelson Award (1970); National Junior College Lineman of the Year (1968)

Renzo Guido "Rock" Perdoni (December 10, 1947 – June 15, 2026) was an Italian-American gridiron football player who was a consensus All-American tackle for the Georgia Tech Yellow Jackets team. Afterward, Perdoni played professionally for three seasons in the Canadian Football League (CFL).

== Early life ==
Perdoni was born in Italy, near Milan. Perdoni moved to the United States with his family when he was six years old. He grew up in Wellesley, Massachusetts, where he attended Wellesley High School and played for the Wellesley Raiders high school football team.

== College career ==
=== Ferrum College ===
Perdoni initially attended Ferrum College, which was then a two-year junior college, located in Ferrum, Virginia, where he played lineman for the Ferrum Panthers football team from 1967 to 1968. As a second-year starter in 1968, he was a team captain and standout lineman for the Ferrum Panthers team that won the National Junior College Athletic Association national championship. He was recognized as the national junior college lineman of the year in 1968.

=== Georgia Tech ===
After completing his sophomore year at Ferrum, Perdoni transferred to Georgia Tech in Atlanta, Georgia. He was a two-year starter at defensive tackle for coach Bud Carson's Georgia Tech Yellow Jackets in 1969 and 1970. In 1969 he had ten-tackle performance in which his pass rush contributed to four interceptions in the Yellow Jackets' 6–0 upset of the Georgia Bulldogs. He was named a third-team All-American by the Associated Press following his 1969 junior season.

As a senior team captain in 1970, he was a key member of the Yellow Jackets team that compiled a 9–3 record, and had 13 tackles in the Jackets' 17–9 victory over the Texas Tech Red Raiders in the December 1970 Sun Bowl. Following his senior season, he was a finalist for the first annual Lombardi Award, honoring the best college lineman of the year, and he was recognized as a consensus first-team All-American in 1970, when he received first-team honors from the Associated Press (AP), the America Football Coaches Association (AFCA), Central Press Association (CPA), the Football Writers Association of America (FWAA), United Press International (UPI), Football News, The Sporting News and the Walter Camp Foundation.

Perdoni was inducted into the Georgia Tech Sports Hall of Fame in 1979. As of 2013, he still ranks among the top ten Georgia Tech linemen for career tackles, with 210.

== Professional career ==
After his college career, he signed with the Winnipeg Blue Bombers of the Canadian Football League, and he played the defensive tackle position for the Blue Bombers and Hamilton Tiger-Cats during the 1971 season. He also played for the Edmonton Eskimos in 1972, and the Saskatchewan Roughriders in 1972 and 1973. During his three-season CFL career, Perdoni played in 32 regular season games.

== Death ==
Perdoni died on June 15, 2026, at the age of 78.

== See also ==
- Georgia Tech Yellow Jackets
- List of Georgia Tech alumni
