= 1943 All-Big Six Conference football team =

The 1943 All-Big Six Conference football team consists of American football players chosen by various organizations for All-Big Six Conference teams for the 1943 college football season. The selectors for the 1943 season included the Associated Press (AP) and the United Press (UP).

== All-Big Six selections ==
=== Backs ===
- Don Reece, Missouri (AP-1; UP-1)
- Bob Brumley, Oklahoma (AP-1; UP-1)
- Howard Tippee, Iowa State (AP-1; UP-1)
- Derald Lebow, Oklahoma (AP-1; UP-2)
- Bob George, Kansas (AP-2; UP-1)
- Bill Dellastatious, Missouri (AP-2; UP-2)
- Jon Machen, Kansas State (AP-2)
- George Gast, Iowa State (UP-2)
- Paul Collins, Missouri (UP-2)

=== Ends ===
- W. G. Wooton, Oklahoma (AP-1; UP-1)
- Jack Morton, Missouri (AP-1; UP-1)
- George Dick, Kansas (AP-2; UP-2)
- Bert Ekern, Missouri (AP-2; UP-2)

=== Tackles ===
- Lee Kennon, Oklahoma (AP-1; UP-1)
- Alfred Anderson, Missouri (AP-1; UP-1)
- Charles Wright, Iowa State (AP-2; UP-2)
- Mel Shanda, Iowa State (AP-2)
- Jim Kekeris, Missouri (UP-2)

=== Guards ===
- Gale Fulghum, Oklahoma (AP-1; UP-1)
- Frank Gruden, Kansas (AP-1)
- Bob Eigelberger, Missouri (AP-2; UP-1)
- Julius Penney, Kansas (AP-2; UP-2)
- Frank Hazard, Nebraska (UP-2)

=== Centers ===
- Bob Mayfield, Oklahoma (AP-1; UP-1)
- Ralph Stewart, Missouri (UP-2)

== Key ==
AP = Associated Press

UP = United Press

== See also ==
- 1943 College Football All-America Team
