= Don Popplewell =

American football player (born 1949)

Profile
- Position: Center

Personal information
- Born: January 24, 1949 (age 77); Iberia, Missouri, U.S.

Career information
- College: University of Colorado Boulder

Career history
- 1969–1970: Colorado Buffaloes

Awards and highlights
- Consensus All-American (1970); First-team All-Big Eight (1970); Second-team All-Big Eight (1969)

Donald C. Popplewell (born January 24, 1949) is an American former football player. He played college football for the Colorado Buffaloes and was a consensus All-American center in 1970.

Popplewell was raised in Raytown, Missouri. He attended the University of Colorado Boulder where he played college football at the center position for the Colorado Buffaloes. He was six feet, two inches tall and weighed 240 pounds as a football player at Colorado. He was a member of the 1969 Colorado Buffaloes football team that defeated Alabama in the 1969 Liberty Bowl, and, as a senior, he played for the west team in the East–West Shrine Game. He was also a consensus selection to the 1970 College Football All-America Team, receiving first-team honors from the United Press International, Associated Press, Newspaper Enterprise Association, and Football Writers Association of America.

Popplewell was selected by the Los Angeles Rams in the 10th round (254th overall pick) of the 1971 NFL draft, but he did not play in the National Football League.
