= Roy Hilton =

American football player (1943–2019)

No. 85, 78
- Position: Defensive end

Personal information
- Born: March 23, 1943; Georgetown, Mississippi, U.S.
- Died: January 6, 2019 (aged 75); Towson, Maryland, U.S.
- Listed height: 6 ft 6 in (1.98 m)
- Listed weight: 240 lb (109 kg)

Career information
- High school: Parrish (Hazlehurst, Mississippi)
- College: Jackson State
- NFL draft: 1965: 15th round, 210th overall pick
- AFL draft: 1965: 8th round, 59th overall pick

Career history
- Baltimore Colts (1965–1973); New York Giants (1974); Atlanta Falcons (1975)

Awards and highlights
- Super Bowl champion (IV); NFL champion (1968)

Career NFL statistics
- Fumble recoveries: 7
- Interceptions: 1
- Sacks: 40.5
- Stats at Pro Football Reference

Roy Lee Hilton (March 23, 1943 – January 6, 2019) was an American professional football defensive end in the National Football League (NFL) from 1965 through 1975.

== Biography ==
=== Early life ===
Roy Hilton was born March 23, 1943, in Hazlehurst, Mississippi, a town of about 3,100 people located in the southwestern part of the state. He attended Parrish High School.

=== College career ===
After graduation from high school, Hilton enrolled at Utica Junior College in Utica, Mississippi. He transferred to Jackson State College in the spring of 1963, in time for fall football season.

Hilton played both ways for Jackson State, both as a defensive end and a wide receiver.

Hilton received a bachelor's degree in health and physical education from Jackson State in 1965.

=== Professional career ===
==== Baltimore Colts ====
Roy Hilton talks to the media following the Colts' defeat of the Oakland Raiders in the AFC Championship Game, Jan. 3, 1971.

Hilton was selected in both the 1965 National Football League draft and the 1965 American Football League draft — chosen by the NFL's Baltimore Colts in the 15th round with the 210th overall pick and by the AFL's Houston Oilers in the 8th round with that draft's 59th pick. He elected to sign with the Colts, inking a deal for the 1965 NFL season in mid-February. Terms of the contract were undisclosed. The Colts announced that they would be playing Hilton on the defensive side of the ball.

Coming into the NFL as a rookie for the Baltimore Colts in the 1965 season — Hilton was regarded as "skinny," listed on the club's 1965 roster at a weight of just 225 pounds — although the team saw his potential and made a spot on the roster for him as a special teams player. He saw action in all 14 games for the Colts in 1965 and 1966.

In the 1967 season he was able to work into starting role at left defensive end, hearing his name called as a starter in 8 of the team's 14 games that year.

This was not long to be, however, with the coming of first round draft pick and future Hall of Famer Bubba Smith, who was moved from reserve defensive tackle to starting left defensive end effective with the 1968 season.

The 1968 season would be an important one for the Colts, who would win the 1968 NFL Championship Game before suffering an upset defeat in Super Bowl III at the hands of Joe Namath and the upstart New York Jets of the AFL.

Although with the retirement of Ordell Braase he found himself a permanent place as starting right defensive end for the Colts in 1969, Hilton would spend his career in the shadow of his defensive line-mate.

"Bubba was something," Hilton later recalled. "If he got mad and decided he was going to get the quarterback, they simply could not stop him. He was that good. He was bigger and stronger than me..."

The Colts would make it back to the big show after capturing the Western Division crown in the 1970 NFL season.

In Super Bowl V, held in January 1971 against the Dallas Cowboys, Hilton played the game of his life. He made two quarterback sacks, four tackles, and hurried quarterback Craig Morton into making a bad throw that led to a critical interception and the game-tying touchdown. After the game, Colts head coach Don McCafferty walked up to Hilton, embraced him, and whispered the single word, "Thanks."

"That was the highlight of my entire career," Hilton later recalled.

A career lowlight came in 1973, when Hilton started eight games before finding himself returned to the bench.

==== New York Giants ====
The disaffected 31-year old was swapped in June 1974 to the New York Giants for 25-year old running back Joe Orduna and a future draft pick, a sixth round selection in the 1975 NFL draft.

Some observers speculated that the trade may have been related to the new front office regime in Baltimore, with new owner Robert Irsay's general manager Joe Thomas rapidly emptying the roster of players obtained under owner Carroll Rosenbloom. With Hilton's departure, only three players remained in blue-and-white from Colts teams before 1972.

The Giants were terrible in 1974, finishing with a record of 2–12. Hilton was there for the entirety, starting all 14 games at left defensive end. When asked about the miserable season, Hilton replied, "It wasn't bad when if you consider that if I'd stayed in Baltimore, we'd also be 2–12."

As the Giants made their final cuts for the 1975 NFL season, the 32-year old Roy Hilton's name was on the list. Though of little consolation, joining Hilton on the Giants' chopping block was his former Colts teammate Jim O'Brien, the placekicking wide receiver who was the hero of Super Bowl V.

Hilton was surprised by the Giants' decision to release him. "I came to camp in the best condition of my life, ready to have the best season of my life," Hilton said. "It was kind of a shocker, especially being waived. I had figured they would go with youth, but I thought that meant I would be traded, not cut outright."

==== Atlanta Falcons ====
A landing spot was found with the Atlanta Falcons, who cut veteran defensive lineman Rosie Manning to make room on the roster for Hilton. The season which followed would not be the best season of Hilton's life, however, but rather his last.

Hilton's season started well, as the 6'6" pass rusher batted down four passes in his first two games in a Falcons uniform, weeks 3 and 4 victories over Western Division rivals the New Orleans Saints and the San Francisco 49ers. The Falcons would go into a tailspin, however, dropping their next five games in a row, en route to a record of 4–10, with the defense receiving its share of the blame. Throughout the season, Hilton played a reserve role, starting only one game of the losing campaign.

Hilton approached the 1976 Atlanta Falcons season hopefully. "I am enjoying football now because I think this team has a chance," he told an Atlanta Constitution reporter. "Football is a unique business. Whereas in other businesses you build up experience and a clientele and gain security with the years, in football it's the other way around. Kids look at you and say you're 33 and an old man and they say, 'I'm going out and beat this old man.' And you say, 'Hey, I'm not going to let this kid beat me out.' In the long run, with everything equal, youth wins out."

On September 7, 1976, youth won out. Hilton was waived by the Atlanta Falcons to make way for Jim Bailey, a 28-year old reserve defensive lineman last with the Cleveland Browns, and a former defensive line teammate in the early '70s on the Colts.

Roy Hilton's NFL career was at an end.

=== Life after football ===
After retiring from football in 1975, Hilton became a security guard for Johns Hopkins University, a job he held for twenty years.

He was married to Marie Hilton for 53 years.

He suffered several physical ailments which may have been associated with his time in football, including three surgeries for knee replacement — two on his left knee and one on his right — as well as gout, arthritis, and the Alzheimer's disease and dementia that would ultimately kill him.

=== Death and legacy ===
Hilton died in 2019 at the age of 75; he had dementia in his later years.

His grandson, Brandon Copeland, went on to play linebacker in the NFL for five NFL teams over a 10 season career.

An NFL champion in 1968 and Super Bowl champion for the 1970 season, Hilton is remembered for his consistency and hard work on the field. Colts All-Pro offensive tackle Bob Vogel, who frequently lined up opposite Hilton in practice, was particularly gratified for the work Hilton put in. Shortly before Hilton's death Vogel told him: "I want to thank you for playing a part in whatever success I had. As the league's smallest tackle, my technique had to be good, and I attribute that to you. You stayed out there and worked with me, and I am grateful."
