= Wilfred Thorpe =

American football player (1917–1998)

No. 26, 48
- Positions: Guard, Linebacker, Defensive end

Personal information
- Born: January 8, 1917; Little Rock, Arkansas, U.S.
- Died: July 16, 1998 (aged 81); Little Rock, Arkansas, U.S.
- Listed height: 6 ft 3 in (1.91 m)
- Listed weight: 205 lb (93 kg)

Career information
- High school: Little Rock Central
- College: Arkansas (1936-1939)
- NFL draft: 1940: 9th round, 75th overall pick

Career history
- Cleveland Rams (1941–1942)

Awards and highlights
- Second-team All-SWC (1939)

Career NFL statistics
- Interceptions: 2
- Stats at Pro Football Reference

Wilfred Egner Thorpe (January 8, 1917 – July 16, 1998) was an American professional football guard and linebacker. He was drafted by the Cleveland Rams in the 9th round (75th overall) of the 1940 NFL Draft. He played for the Cleveland Rams from 1941 to 1942.
