= Bob Newton (American football) =

American football player

No. 78, 67, 74, 79
- Position: Guard

Personal information
- Born: August 16, 1949 (age 77); Pomona, California, U.S.
- Listed height: 6 ft 5 in (1.96 m)
- Listed weight: 260 lb (118 kg)

Career information
- High school: John Glenn (Norwalk, California)
- College: Cerritos College; Nebraska
- NFL draft: 1971: 3rd round, 71st overall pick

Career history
- Chicago Bears (1971–1975); Seattle Seahawks (1976–1981); Chicago Blitz (1983)

Awards and highlights
- National champion (1970); Consensus All-American (1970); First-team All-Big Eight (1970)
- Stats at Pro Football Reference

Robert Lee Newton (born August 16, 1949) is an American former professional football player who was a guard in the National Football League (NFL) from 1971 to 1981.

== Early life ==
Newton was voted most improved player his junior year and "most valuable lineman" and All-League defensive tackle his senior year at John Glenn High School. He then played for two seasons (1967–68) at Cerritos College and won named 2nd Team All-Conference and earned the team's Most Outstanding Offensive Lineman.

== College career ==
At Nebraska

Coach Bob Devaney labeled Newton as a lineman “who definitely should be considered as an All-American” and Bob delivered in 1970. Newton stepped in as a transfer star in 1969 and earned consensus All-America and unanimous All-Big Eight honors in 1970. Set Big Eight record by being nominated four times for Lineman-of-the-Week laurels.

In his junior year, Newton paved the way for sophomore Jeff Kinney to explode onto the scene. Kinney rushed for a team-high 619 yards and 10 touchdowns. On the year the Huskers rushed for 2,312 yards and 22 touchdowns.

Newton’s senior year he started on an offensive line that guided the Huskers to their first national championship. In the title game, the Huskers rushed for 132 yards and had 293 yards of total offense. On the season, Nebraska rushed for 3,012 yards which was 700 more yards than the previous year. The Husker line paved the way for four 300-yard rushers and two rushers that went over 600 yards on the year (Kinney – 699 yards and Joe Orduna – 915 yards). The Huskers were second in the conference in total yards with 421.3 yards per game, only 1.6 yards per game behind leader Colorado.

· 1971 Senior Bowl, Coaches All American game, 1971 College All Star Game

· 1970 First-Team All-American (AP, Coaches-Kodak, FWAA-Look, Football News, Central Press Captains)

· 1970 Second-Team All-American (NEA, UPI)

· 1970 First-Team All-Big 8 (AP, UPI)

· 1970 Nebraska Lineman-of-the-Week (Wake Forest, Minnesota, Kansas, Oklahoma State)

== Professional career ==
Newton played for the Chicago Bears from 1971 to 1975 and with Pro Football Hall of Fame players Dick Butkus, Gale Sayers and Walter Payton. He played for the Seattle Seahawks from 1976 to 1981 with Hall of Famer Steve Largent. Newton was on the 1976 Seattle Seahawks expansion team that got the franchise started. He was a third round draft selection of the Chicago Bears in the 197 NFL Draft. He was moved from offensive tackle to guard his rookie year. He was named 1980 Seahawks Lineman of the Year. In 1983, Newton had brief playing experiences with the Boston Breakers and Chicago Blitz of the USFL, but his chemical dependency illness forced him to leave both teams.

== Post-football career ==
In July 1983, Newton entered Valley General Hospital treatment center in Monroe, Washington for chemical dependency. After treatment he went back to the University of Nebraska to finish his education and in 1986, he began working in the chemical dependency field. He received his master's degree from Capella University in 2005. He has over 30 years experience as a counselor, educator, administrator and professional speaker. Newton previously worked for the Betty Ford center for many years as lead counselor and director. He also served as lead relapse prevention facilitator for the Young Adult Track at the Betty Ford Center.

Today, Bob works as an independent consultant. He provides counseling and administrative services in communities struggling with substance abuse.

"I work with patients in privates clinics and outpatient settings ... We have a real problem with substance use disorders and addictive drugs in our society ... helping patients get well can be very rewarding."
