= Ernie Pannell =

American football player (1917–1998)

No. 22
- Position: Offensive tackle

Personal information
- Born: February 2, 1917; Manor, Texas, U.S.
- Died: September 24, 1998 (aged 81); Houston, Texas, U.S.
- Listed height: 6 ft 2 in (1.88 m)
- Listed weight: 220 lb (100 kg)

Career information
- College: Texas A&M
- NFL draft: 1941: 16th round, 146th overall pick

Career history
- Green Bay Packers (1941–1942, 1945)

Awards and highlights
- National champion (1939); First-team All-SWC (1940); Second-team All-SWC (1939)

Career NFL statistics
- Games played: 22
- Games started: 11
- Stats at Pro Football Reference

Ernest Woodrow Pannell (February 2, 1917 – September 24, 1998) was a player in the National Football League (NFL). He was selected by the Green Bay Packers in the sixteenth round of the 1941 NFL draft and played three seasons with the team.
