= Jim Bailey (American football) =

American football player (born 1948)

No. 65, 79, 76, 72
- Positions: Defensive tackle, Defensive end

Personal information
- Born: June 9, 1948 (age 78); Kansas City, Missouri, U.S.
- Listed height: 6 ft 4 in (1.93 m)
- Listed weight: 253 lb (115 kg)

Career information
- High school: Center
- College: Kansas (1966-1969)
- NFL draft: 1970: 2nd round, 44th overall pick

Career history
- Baltimore Colts (1970–1974); New York Jets (1975); Cleveland Browns (1976)*; Atlanta Falcons (1976–1978)
- * Offseason or practice squad member only

Awards and highlights
- Super Bowl champion (V); Second-team All-Big Eight (1969)

Career NFL statistics
- Fumble recoveries: 6
- Interceptions: 1
- Sacks: 23
- Stats at Pro Football Reference

James Randall Bailey (born June 9, 1948) is an American former gridiron football player. After attending the University of Kansas, he played nine seasons in the National Football League (NFL) as a defensive lineman during the 1970s.

== Career ==
Bailey spent the first five seasons of his NFL career with the Baltimore Colts; he and his team won Super Bowl V in January 1971.

Bailey spent the 1975 season with the New York Jets. On September 7, 1976, the 28-year old Bailey, who had previously been in camp with the Cleveland Browns, was signed as a free agent by the Atlanta Falcons. Former Colts starting left defensive end Roy Hilton was cut to make room for Bailey on the Falcons' roster. Bailey ended his NFL career with the Falcons, last playing in 1978.

After ending his gridiron football career, Bailey worked in gas and real estate.
