= Fred Hartman (American football) =

American football player (1917–1984)

No. 35, 73
- Position: Tackle

Personal information
- Born: May 21, 1917; Dallas, Texas, U.S.
- Died: April 30, 1984 (aged 66); Houston, Texas, U.S.
- Listed height: 6 ft 1 in (1.85 m)
- Listed weight: 229 lb (104 kg)

Career information
- High school: Pampa (Pampa, Texas)
- College: Schreiner College; Rice
- NFL draft: 1941: 8th round, 61st overall pick

Career history
- Chicago Bears (1947); Philadelphia Eagles (1948)

Awards and highlights
- NFL champion (1948); Second-team All-American (1940); First-team All-SWC (1940)

Career NFL statistics
- Games played: 23
- Stats at Pro Football Reference

Frederick Lilburn Hartman (May 21, 1917 – April 30, 1984) was an American professional football tackle who played for two seasons in the National Football League (NFL). He played college football for Schreiner College and Rice before being drafted by the Chicago Bears in the eighth round (61st overall) of the 1941 NFL draft. He played for the Bears in 1947 and for the Philadelphia Eagles in 1948, winning an NFL championship with the Eagles in 1948.
