= Jim McFarland =

American football player (1947–2020)

Member of the Nebraska Legislature from the 28th district
- In office January 1987 – January 1991
- Preceded by: Chris Beutler
- Succeeded by: Chris Beutler

Personal details
- Born: October 4, 1947 North Platte, Nebraska, U.S.
- Died: November 27, 2020 (aged 73) Omaha, Nebraska, U.S.
- Party: Democratic
- Education: Cornell Law School; Creighton University (Master of Fine Arts)
- Football career

No. 80, 83
- Position: Tight end

Personal information
- Listed height: 6 ft 5 in (1.96 m)
- Listed weight: 225 lb (102 kg)

Career information
- High school: North Platte (North Platte, Nebraska)
- College: Nebraska
- NFL draft: 1970: 7th round, 164th overall pick

Career history
- Buffalo Bills (1970); St. Louis Cardinals (1970–1974); Miami Dolphins (1975)

Awards and highlights
- Second-team All-American (1969); First-team All-Big Eight (1969)
- Stats at Pro Football Reference

James Darrell McFarland (October 4, 1947 – November 27, 2020) was an American football player, lawyer, and politician.

== Football career ==
McFarland was an American football player who played tight end for six seasons in the National Football League (NFL) with the Buffalo Bills, St. Louis Cardinals, and Miami Dolphins.

In 1999, he was inducted into the Nebraska Football Hall of Fame. As of 2012, he ranks 44th on Nebraska's all-time single game receiving yards with 117 yards on 7 catches during a game against Texas A&M on September 28, 1969. He is considered to be one of Nebraska's top athletes and was considered for the Omaha World-Herald's list of top 100.

== Law and political career ==
After leaving football, McFarland received his law degree from Cornell Law School in 1980. He practiced law in Lincoln, Nebraska. McFarland was appointed to the Nebraska Legislature as a state senator for Nebraska's 28th district to fill a vacancy and was elected to the legislature in 1986, as a Democrat and served until 1990. He later ran for governor of Nebraska. In 2017, McFarland retired from his law practice and moved to Omaha, Nebraska. He received his master's degree in fine arts in creative writing, from Creighton University.

== Death ==
He died of pancreatic cancer on November 27, 2020, in Omaha, Nebraska, at age 73.
