= Joe Orduna =

American football player (born 1948)

- Orduna in 1975

No. 49, 37
- Position: Running back

Personal information
- Born: November 6, 1948 (age 78); Omaha, Nebraska, U.S.
- Listed height: 6 ft 0 in (1.83 m)
- Listed weight: 195 lb (88 kg)

Career information
- High school: Omaha Central
- College: Nebraska
- NFL draft: 1971: 2nd round, 49th overall pick

Career history
- San Francisco 49ers (1971)*; New York Giants (1972–1973); Baltimore Colts (1974)
- * Offseason or practice squad member only

Awards and highlights
- National champion (1970); Second-team All-American (1970); First-team All-Big Eight (1970); Second-team All-Big Eight (1968)

Career NFL statistics
- Games played: 39
- Starts: 7
- Rushing yards: 236
- Average: 3.3
- Touchdowns: 3
- Stats at Pro Football Reference

Joseph Manuel Orduña (born November 6, 1948) is an American former professional football player who was a running back in the National Football League (NFL) for the New York Giants and Baltimore Colts from 1972 to 1974.

== Biography ==
Joe Orduña played college football for the Nebraska Cornhuskers, where he ran for over 100 yards 4 times. He was the Cornhusker's leading rusher in their 1970 National Championship season with 834 yards. He was the most valuable player of the 1971 Coaches All-America Game. Over his career at Nebraska he rushed for 1958 yards. He was selected by the San Francisco 49ers in the 2nd round (49th pick overall) of the 1971 NFL draft. He spent the 1971 season on the 49ers taxi squad due to a leg injury suffered in the final preseason game and did not play a game for them.

The Giants acquired Orduña on waivers from the 49ers just before the beginning of the 1972 season. He was active for the Giants first game of the 1972 season but was deactivated for the next 3 games before he was reactivated due to injuries to other running backs. Orduña ended up playing 11 games for the Giants in 1972, starting 4. He rushed for 129 yards on 36 carries with 1 touchdown.

In 1973 Orduña played in all 14 games for the Giants, starting 3 and rushing for 104 yards on 36 attempts with 1 touchdown. Before the 1974 season the Giants traded him along with a draft choice to the Colts for defensive end Roy Hilton. Although he played in all 14 games for the Colts in 1974, he rushed only twice for 3 yards and 1 touchdown, all coming in an October 20 game against the New York Jets. The Colts waived him before the 1975 season due to an excess of running backs on the team, and he was not picked up by any other team.
