= Jack Sanders (American football) =

American football player and coach (1917–1991)

No. 55, 44, 67
- Position: Guard

Personal information
- Born: March 10, 1917; San Antonio, Texas, U.S.
- Died: October 26, 1991 (aged 74); Aransas Pass, Texas, U.S.
- Listed height: 6 ft 0 in (1.83 m)
- Listed weight: 219 lb (99 kg)

Career information
- High school: Rockport-Fulton (Rockport, Texas)
- College: SMU
- NFL draft: 1939: 17th round, 160th overall pick

Career history

Playing
- Pittsburgh Steelers (1940–1942); Philadelphia Eagles (1945)

Coaching
- Trinity (TX) (1947) Line coach; Trinity (TX) (1947–1948) Head coach

Awards and highlights
- First-team All-SWC (1939)

Career NFL statistics
- Games played: 33
- Games started: 19
- Stats at Pro Football Reference

Jack Sanders (March 10, 1917 – October 26, 1991) was an American professional football guard who played for four seasons in the National Football League (NFL). After playing college football for SMU, he was drafted by the New York Giants in the 17th round of the 1939 NFL draft. He played for the Pittsburgh Steelers from 1940 to 1942, before enlisting in the United States Marine Corps during World War II. He fought in the Battle of Iwo Jima as a first lieutenant in March 1945, and had part of his left arm amputated due to injuries sustained from an explosion while testing underwater demolitions. On August 17, 1945, he signed a contract with the Philadelphia Eagles, and became the first World War II disabled veteran to sign an NFL contract. He played in three games for the Eagles in 1945. In the first game of the season, against the Green Bay Packers, the United States Armed Forces paid to send 22,000 amputees to the game to watch Sanders play.

Sanders became the line coach for the Trinity University football team in 1946, but the school did not field a team that season due to budgetary limitations. On October 10, 1947, he was named temporary head coach of the team to allow previous head coach and athletic director Bob Coe to spend more time overseeing the entire athletic department. Sanders resigned as head coach on January 4, 1949, and accepted a position as an assistant superintendent of a construction company.

On August 29, 1966, Sanders announced his application to the NFL in a bid to be awarded the ownership of an expansion New Orleans franchise as the 16th NFL team. He said that if the New Orleans franchise were selected and awarded to him, he would enlist 30,000 minority owners and own 52% of the team himself. He was advised by former Chicago Cardinals, Detroit Lions, and Pittsburgh Steelers head coach Buddy Parker. On November 1, 1966, the NFL awarded the 16th franchise to New Orleans. William G. Helis Jr., Herman Lay, John W. Mecom Jr., Louis J. Roussel Jr., Sanders, and Edgar B. Stern Jr. were the six bidders for the franchise. The New Orleans franchise was awarded to Mecom on December 15, 1966, with his winning bid of $8.5 million.

== Head coaching record ==
=== College ===
Year	Team	Overall	Conference	Standing	Bowl/playoffs
Trinity Tigers (Lone Star Conference) (1947–1948)
1947	Trinity	4–2–1 (Note: Bob Coe served as Trinity's head coach for the three games of the 1947 season before Sanders was promoted from line coach to replace him. The team finished with an overall record of 5–3–2 and a conference mark of 3–2–1.)	2–1–1	4th	
1948	Trinity	6–2–2	2–2–2	T–4th	
Trinity:		10–4–3	4–3–3		
Total:		10–4–3			
