= Ron Yankowski =

American football player (born 1946)

No. 78
- Position: Defensive end

Personal information
- Born: October 23, 1946 (age 80); Arlington, Massachusetts, U.S.
- Listed height: 6 ft 5 in (1.96 m)
- Listed weight: 244 lb (111 kg)

Career information
- College: Kansas State
- NFL draft: 1971: 8th round, 199th overall pick

Career history
- St. Louis Cardinals (1971–1980)

Awards and highlights
- First-team All-Big Eight (1970)

Career NFL statistics
- Sacks: 30
- Fumble recoveries: 5
- Defensive TDs: 1
- Stats at Pro Football Reference

Ronald William Yankowski (born October 23, 1946) is an American former professional football player who was a defensive end for 10 seasons in the National Football League (NFL) for the St. Louis Cardinals. Yankowski played college football for the Kansas State Wildcats and Northeastern Oklahoma A&M Golden Norsemen.

Yankowski was selected 199th overall in the eighth round by the St. Louis Cardinals in 1971. He started ten games at defensive end his rookie season. The biggest play of his career came in a 1974 game at Washington when he returned a Billy Kilmer fumble 71 yards for a touchdown to help the Cards to a 17–10 victory. Yankowski played in 128 games during his ten-year career in St. Louis and finished with five fumble recoveries and 30 sacks.
