= 1944 All-Big Six Conference football team =

The 1944 All-Big Six Conference football team consists of American football players chosen by various organizations for All-Big Six Conference teams for the 1944 college football season. The selectors for the 1944 season included the Associated Press (AP) and the United Press (UP).

== All-Big Six selections ==
=== Backs ===
- Derald Lebow, Oklahoma (AP-1; UP-1)
- Bill Dellastatious, Missouri (AP-1; UP-1)
- Paul Collins, Missouri (AP-1; UP-1)
- Charles Moffett, Kansas (AP-1; UP-2)
- Meredith Warner, Iowa State (AP-2; UP-1)
- Charles Heard, Oklahoma (AP-2; UP-2)
- Gene Phelps, Iowa State (AP-2; UP-2)
- Kenneth Hollins, Nebraska (AP-2)
- Basil Sharp, Oklahoma (UP-2)

=== Ends ===
- Dub Wooton, Oklahoma (AP-1; UP-1)
- Rex Wagner, Iowa State (AP-1; UP-2)
- Merle Dinkins, Oklahoma (UP-1)
- Bob Eigelberger, Missouri (AP-2; UP-2)
- Warren Riegle, Kansas (AP-2)

=== Tackles ===
- Jim Kekeris, Missouri (AP-1; UP-1)
- John Harley, Oklahoma (AP-1; UP-1)
- Richard Cole, Iowa State (AP-2)
- Bill Hallett, Oklahoma (UP-2)
- Ken Trommier, Iowa State (UP-2)

=== Guards ===
- John Fathauer, Iowa State (AP-1; UP-1)
- Charles Wright, Iowa State (AP-1; UP-1)
- Bob Stone, Missouri (AP-2; UP-2)
- Thurman Tigart, Oklahoma (AP-2; UP-2)
- Russell Hardin, Kansas State (AP-2)

=== Centers ===
- Bob Mayfield, Oklahoma (AP-1; UP-1)
- Wayne Hird, Kansas (AP-2; UP-2)

== Key ==
AP = Associated Press

UP = United Press

== See also ==
- 1944 College Football All-America Team
