= Herb Orvis =

American football player (1946–2020)

No. 80, 88
- Positions: Defensive tackle, defensive end

Personal information
- Born: October 17, 1946; Petoskey, Michigan, U.S.
- Died: August 14, 2020 (aged 73); Goodyear, Arizona, U.S.
- Listed height: 6 ft 5 in (1.96 m)
- Listed weight: 248 lb (112 kg)

Career information
- College: Colorado
- NFL draft: 1972: 1st round, 16th overall pick

Career history
- Detroit Lions (1972–1977); Baltimore Colts (1978–1981)

Awards and highlights
- First-team All-American (1971); Second-team All-American (1970); 2× First-team All-Big Eight (1970, 1971); Second-team All-Big Eight (1969)

Career NFL statistics
- Sacks: 23
- Fumble recoveries: 9
- Stats at Pro Football Reference
- College Football Hall of Fame

Herbert Vaughn Orvis (October 17, 1946 – August 14, 2020) was an American professional football player who was a defensive tackle for the Detroit Lions and the Baltimore Colts in a ten-year career that lasted from 1972 to 1981 in the National Football League (NFL). He played college football for the Colorado Buffaloes.

== Biography ==
Orvis went to Beecher High School. He joined the United States Army prior to his senior year at Beecher High School. Orvis was able to receive his high school diploma after serving overseas in the military. Orvis played college football at the University of Colorado. Orvis was a 1971 All-American and twice earned first-team All-Big Eight honors. He was named to the 1970s All-Big Eight Decade team. In 1971, CU finished ranked #3 in national polls. In 2014, Orvis was named to the University of Colorado Athletic Hall of Fame.

Orvis was drafted 16th overall in the first round of the 1972 NFL draft by the Lions, playing for five years with that team. The last four seasons of his playing career were with the Baltimore Colts which had acquired him from the Lions on May 1, 1978, for Freddie Scott and a fourth-round selection (107th overall) in the NFL draft which eventually became Homer Elias one day later.

In 1971 he was an All-American. Two times he received first-team All-Big Eight honors. He was inducted into the Colorado University Athletic Hall of Fame on October 30, 2014, and was named to its All-Century team, celebrating the first 100 years of Buffaloes’ football.

After football, he grew citrus fruit, owned an art gallery, and ran a construction business. He retired in 2013.

Orvis was chosen to be inducted into the College Football Hall of Fame on January 8, 2015. The ceremony was held December 6, 2016 in New York City. Orvis died on August 14, 2020, at the age of 73.

== See also ==
- List of Detroit Lions first-round draft picks
