= 1969 All-Big Eight Conference football team =

American all-star college football team

The 1969 All-Big Eight Conference football team consists of American football players chosen by various organizations for All-Big Eight Conference teams for the 1969 NCAA University Division football season. The selectors for the 1969 season included the Associated Press (AP) and the United Press International (UPI).

== Offensive selections ==
=== Tight ends ===
- Jim McFarland, Nebraska (AP-1, UPI-2)
- Steve Zabel, Oklahoma (AP-2, UPI-1)

=== Split ends ===
- Mel Gray, Missouri (AP-1, UPI-1)
- Otto Stowe, Iowa State (AP-2, UPI-2)

=== Tackles ===
- John Ward, Oklahoma State (AP-1, UPI-1)
- Larron Jackson, Missouri (AP-1, UPI-1)
- Lynn Larson, Kansas State (AP-2, UPI-2)
- Mike Carroll, Missouri (AP-2)

=== Guards ===
- Dick Melvin, Colorado (AP-1, UPI-1)
- Ken Mendenhall, Oklahoma (AP-1, UPI-2)
- Bill Elfstrom, Oklahoma (AP-2, UPI-1)
- Mike Bliss, Iowa State (AP-2, UPI-2)
- James Carver, Kansas State (UPI-2)

=== Centers ===
- Dale Evans, Kansas (AP-1, UPI-1)
- Don Popplewell, Colorado (AP-2)
- Wayne Beske, Iowa State (UPI-2)

=== Backs ===
- Lynn Dickey, Kansas State (AP-1, UPI-1)
- Steve Owens, Oklahoma (AP-1, UPI-1)
- Mack Herron, Kansas State (AP-1, UPI-1)
- Bobby Anderson, Colorado (AP-1, UPI-1)
- Terry McMillan, Missouri (AP-2, UPI-2)
- Joe Moore, Missouri (AP-2, UPI-2)
- Jon Staggers, Missouri (AP-2, UPI-2)
- John Riggins, Kansas (AP-2)

== Defensive selections ==
=== Defensive ends ===
- Manuel Barrera, Kansas State (AP-1, UPI-1)
- Bill Brundige, Colorado (AP-1, UPI-1)
- Sherwin Jarmon, Nebraska (AP-2, UPI-2)
- Herb Orvis, Colorado (AP-2)

=== Defensive tackles ===
- John Little, Oklahoma State (AP-1, UPI-1)
- Jerry Sherk, Oklahoma State (AP-1, UPI-2)
- Mark Kuhlman, Missouri (AP-2, UPI-1)
- Bill Collins, Colorado (AP-2, UPI-2)
- Jim Bailey, Kansas (UPI-2)

=== Middle guards ===
- John Stucky, Kansas State (AP-1, UPI-1)
- Sam Adams, Missouri (AP-2, UPI-2)

=== Linebackers ===
- Ken Geddes, Nebraska (AP-1, UPI-1)
- Emery Hicks, Kansas (AP-1, UPI-1)
- Jerry Murtaugh, Nebraska (AP-1, UPI-1)
- Steve Lundholm, Missouri (AP-2, UPI-2)
- Steve Casteel, Oklahoma (AP-2, UPI-2)
- Jim Files, Oklahoma (AP-2, UPI-2)

=== Defensive backs ===
- Dana Stephenson, Nebraska (AP-1, UPI-1)
- Tony Washington, Iowa State (AP-1, UPI-1)
- Dennis Poppe, Missouri (AP-1, UPI-1)
- Butch Davis, Missouri (AP-2, UPI-2)
- Eric Harris, Colorado (AP-2, UPI-2)
- Mike Kolich, Kansas State (AP-2, UPI-2)

== Key ==
AP = Associated Press

UPI = United Press International

Bold = Consensus first-team selection of both the Associated Press and United Press International

== See also ==
- 1969 College Football All-America Team
