= Otto Stowe =

American football player (born 1949)

No. 82
- Position: Wide receiver

Personal information
- Born: February 25, 1949 (age 77); Chicago, Illinois, U.S.
- Listed height: 6 ft 2 in (1.88 m)
- Listed weight: 188 lb (85 kg)

Career information
- High school: Feitshans (IL)
- College: Iowa State
- NFL draft: 1971: 2nd round, 47th overall pick

Career history
- Miami Dolphins (1971–1972); Dallas Cowboys (1973); Denver Broncos (1974); Los Angeles Rams (1975)*
- * Offseason or practice squad member only

Awards and highlights
- Super Bowl champion (VII); First-team All-Big Eight (1970); Second-team All-Big Eight (1969)

Career NFL statistics
- Games played: 36
- Receptions: 43
- Receiving yards: 742
- Touchdowns: 10
- Stats at Pro Football Reference

Otto Stowe (born February 25, 1949) is an American former professional football player who was a wide receiver for four seasons in the National Football League (NFL) for the Denver Broncos, Dallas Cowboys, and Miami Dolphins. He played college football at Iowa State University.

== Early life ==
At Feitshans High School he was an All-state selection in both football and basketball. He went on to play basketball at Iowa State University, before focusing on football after his sophomore season and proceeding to lead the team in receiving for 3 consecutive years. He began as a defensive back before being switched to wide receiver.

As a senior in 1970, he had the most prolific receiving season in school history up to that point, breaking single-season school records in receptions (59), receiving yards (822) and touchdowns (6). He also led the Big Eight in all three categories and ranked 13th nationally in receiving, earning first-team all-Big Eight honors. His 59 catches ranks fifth all-time and his 822 receiving yards seventh all-time in school history for a season. He finished his career as Iowa State University all-time leader in receptions (132) and receiving yards (1,751), and second in career touchdowns (10). He still ranks third in career receptions and fifth in receiving yards.

In 2008, he was inducted into the Iowa State University Athletics Hall of Fame.

== Professional career ==
=== Miami Dolphins ===
Stowe was selected by the Miami Dolphins in the second round (47th overall) of the 1971 NFL draft. As a rookie, he was the backup to Paul Warfield, catching 5 passes for 68 yards and 1 touchdown. He again saw limited action in his second season, with 13 receptions, 276 yards and 2 touchdowns). Six of the receptions for 140 yards and both touchdowns came in a single Monday Night Football game against the St. Louis Cardinals while replacing an injured Warfield. Despite winning a Super Bowl, he requested to be traded after the season.

On May 10, 1973, he was traded to the Dallas Cowboys in exchange for wide receiver Ron Sellers and a second round draft choice (#47-Benny Malone). He played on two Super Bowl teams, including the undefeated 1972 Miami Dolphins.

=== Dallas Cowboys ===
In 1973, he was having a Pro Bowl type season starting opposite to Bob Hayes, but suffered a broken ankle in the seventh game against the Philadelphia Eagles, that placed him on the injured reserve list and would hamper him for the rest of his career. He was replaced with rookie Drew Pearson for the rest of the season, but still led the team with 6 touchdown receptions and was second in receiving with 389 yards.

Even though he was starting for the Cowboys, he wasn't happy with his contract, so he was traded to the Denver Broncos for a third round draft choice (#75-John Smith) on September 5, 1974.

=== Denver Broncos ===
In 1974, he had a disappointing season after not being fully recovered from his previous injury which limited his mobility. He appeared in 8 games, while registering 2 receptions for 9 yards and one touchdown. On May 6, 1975, he was traded along with a sixth round draft choice (#156-Art Best) to the Los Angeles Rams, as compensation for signing free agent Phil Olsen.

=== Los Angeles Rams ===
On August 18, Stowe informed the Los Angeles Rams of his decision to retire before the start of the 1975 season. He finished his career after only four seasons, registering 43 receptions, 742 yards, and 10 touchdowns.

== Personal life ==
In 1976, he was a college football graduate assistant at Washington State University. The next year, he became the wide receivers coach at the University of Pittsburgh.
