= 1939 All-Southwest Conference football team =

American college football all-star team

The 1939 All-Southwest Conference football team consists of American football players chosen by various organizations for All-Southwest Conference teams for the 1939 college football season. The selectors for the 1939 season included the Associated Press (AP) and United Press (UP).

== All Southwest selections ==
=== Backs ===
- Kay Eakin, Arkansas (AP-1; UP-1 [QB])
- Olie Cordill, Rice (AP-1; UP-1 [HB])
- Jack Crain, Texas (AP-1; UP-1 [HB])
- John Kimbrough, Texas A&M (AP-1; UP-1 [FB])
- Jim Thomason, Texas A&M (AP-1; UP-2 [HB])
- Pres Johnston, SMU (AP-2; UP-2 [QB])
- Jack Wilson, Baylor (AP-2; UP-2 [FB])
- James Witt, Baylor (UP-2 [HB])
- William Mullenweg, SMU (AP-2)
- Bill Conatser, Texas A&M (AP-2)

=== Ends ===
- Herbert Smith, Texas A&M (AP-1; UP-1)
- Red Hickey, Arkansas (AP-2; UP-1)
- Don Looney, TCU (AP-1; UP-2)
- Durwood Horner, TCU (AP-2; UP-2)

=== Tackles ===
- Jack Sanders, SMU (AP-1; UP-1)
- Joe Boyd, Texas A&M (AP-1; UP-1)
- Park Myers, Texas (AP-2; UP-2)
- Ernie Pannell, Texas A&M (AP-2; UP-2)

=== Guards ===
- Marshall Robnett, Texas A&M (AP-1; UP-1)
- Len Akin, Baylor (AP-1; UP-1)
- Milt Simington, Arkansas (AP-2; UP-2)
- Charles Henke, Texas A&M (UP-2)
- Wilfred Thorpe, Arkansas (AP-2)

=== Centers ===
- Bob Nelson, Baylor (AP-1; UP-1)
- Ken Whitlow, Rice (UP-2)
- Wilburn Echols, SMU (AP-2)

== Key ==
AP = Associated Press UP = United Press

Bold = Consensus first-team selection of both the AP and UP

== See also ==
- 1939 College Football All-America Team
