= Jim Kekeris =

American football player (1923–1997)

No. 77, 72
- Position: Tackle

Personal information
- Born: October 17, 1923; St. Louis, Missouri, U.S.
- Died: September 15, 1997 (aged 73); Columbia, Missouri, U.S.
- Listed height: 6 ft 1 in (1.85 m)
- Listed weight: 257 lb (117 kg)

Career information
- High school: McKinley (St. Louis)
- College: Missouri
- NFL draft: 1947: 3rd round, 14th overall pick

Career history
- Philadelphia Eagles (1947); Green Bay Packers (1948)

Awards and highlights
- Second-team All-American (1945); 3× First-team All-Big Six (1944, 1945, 1946); Second-team All-Big Six (1943)

Career NFL statistics
- Games played: 15
- Games started: 2
- Stats at Pro Football Reference

James J. Kekeris (October 17, 1923 – September 15, 1997) was an American professional football player who was a tackle in the National Football League (NFL).

== Biography ==
Kekeris was born on October 17, 1923, in St. Louis, Missouri.

== Career ==
Kekeris was selected in the third round of the 1947 NFL draft by the Detroit Lions and would play that season with the Philadelphia Eagles. The following season, he played with the Green Bay Packers.

He played at the collegiate level at the University of Missouri and is an inductee in the university's Intercollegiate Athletics Hall of Fame.
