= Jim Thomason =

American football player (1920–2007)

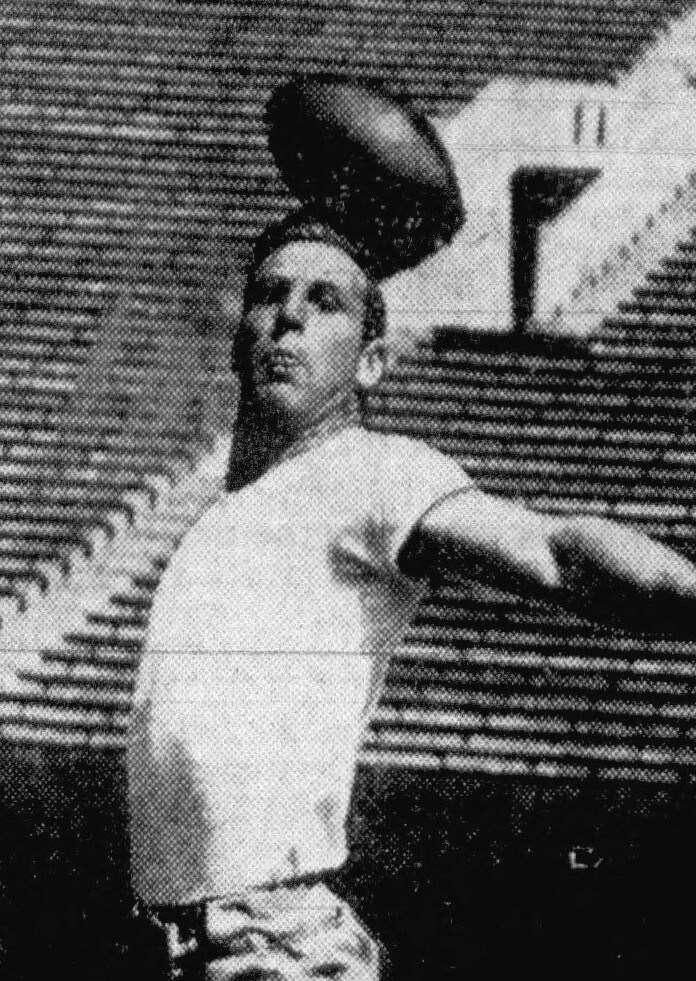
- Thomason in 1942

No. 33
- Position: Halfback

Personal information
- Born: March 28, 1920; Brownwood, Texas, U.S.
- Died: August 4, 2007 (aged 87); Brenham, Texas, U.S.
- Listed height: 6 ft 0 in (1.83 m)
- Listed weight: 200 lb (91 kg)

Career information
- High school: Brownwood
- College: Texas A&M
- NFL draft: 1941: 1st round, 5th overall pick

Career history

Playing
- Detroit Lions (1945)

Coaching
- Greenville AAB (1943) Head coach

Awards and highlights
- National champion (1939); Second-team All-American (1940); 2× First-team All-SWC (1939, 1940)

Career NFL statistics
- Rushing yards: 9
- Rushing average: 1
- Receptions: 1
- Receiving yards: 6
- Stats at Pro Football Reference

James Neal Thomason (March 28, 1920 – August 4, 2007) was an American professional football player and coach. A native of Brownwood, Texas, was Thomason played college football at Texas A&M University and was a member of the 1939 Texas A&M Aggies football team, which won a national championship. He was selected in the first round with the fifth overall selection by the Detroit Lions in the 1941 NFL draft.

Thomason served as an officer in the United States Army Air Forces during World War II. He was head coach of the 1943 Greenville Army Air Base Jay Birds football team.

Thomason later worked as an accountant in Brownwood. He died on August 4, 2007, at this home in Brenham, Texas.

== Head coaching record ==
Year	Team	Overall	Conference	Standing	Bowl/playoffs
[Greenville Army Air Base Jay Birds (Independent) (1943)
1943	Greenville AAB	1–5			
Greenville AAB:		1–5			
Total:		1–5			
