= Paul Collins (quarterback) =

American football player (1922–2012)

No. 24
- Position: Quarterback

Personal information
- Born: September 28, 1922; Fornfelt, Missouri, U.S.
- Died: July 16, 2012 (aged 89); Royal Oak, Michigan, U.S.
- Listed height: 5 ft 11 in (1.80 m)
- Listed weight: 178 lb (81 kg)

Career information
- High school: Hickman (Columbia, Missouri)
- College: Missouri
- NFL draft: 1945: 2nd round, 14th overall pick

Career history
- Chicago Cardinals (1945)

Awards and highlights
- First-team All-Big Six (1944)

Career NFL statistics
- Passing attempts: 17
- Passing completions: 3
- Completion percentage: 17.6%
- TD–INT: 0–2
- Passing yards: 43
- Passer rating: 0
- Stats at Pro Football Reference

Paul Collins (September 28, 1922 – July 16, 2012) was an American professional football quarterback who played in the National Football League (NFL).

== College career ==
Collins attended the University of Missouri and was a member of the basketball, football, and track teams. As a senior, Collins led the Tigers with ten touchdowns scored and was named first team All-Big Six Conference.

== Professional career ==
Collins was drafted in the second round of the 1945 NFL draft by the Chicago Cardinals. He played one season with the team, playing in three games with one start. and completing three of 17 passes for 43 yards with two interceptions. Collins lone start was a 10–0 loss on September 23, 1945, to the Detroit Lions.

== Post-football ==
After the end of his football career Collins worked as an account executive for Purina and Dow Chemical and was a real estate agent for Caldwell Banker. Collins died on July 16, 2012, in Royal Oak, Michigan.
