= Jack Morton =

American football player and coach (1922–1983)

- Morton in 1946

No. 36, 59, 56
- Positions: End, defensive end, defensive back

Personal information
- Born: July 22, 1922; East St. Louis, Illinois, U.S.
- Died: December 17, 1983 (aged 61); Manteno, Illinois, U.S.
- Listed height: 6 ft 0 in (1.83 m)
- Listed weight: 197 lb (89 kg)

Career information
- High school: East St. Louis
- College: Missouri, Purdue
- NFL draft: 1944: 9th round, 84th overall pick

Career history

Playing
- Chicago Bears (1945); Los Angeles Dons (1946); Buffalo Bills (1947)

Coaching
- DePauw (1953-1955) Line; Toledo (1956) Head coach; Green Bay Packers (1957–1958) Defensive line; Marquette (1959) Assistant; Grand Rapid Blazers (1961; 1963) Head coach; Joliet Explorers (1964) Defensive coordinator

Awards and highlights
- UFL champion (1961); First-team All-Big Six (1943)

Career NFL/AAFC statistics
- Receptions: 5
- Receiving yards: 62
- Touchdowns: 1
- Stats at Pro Football Reference

Head coaching record
- Regular season: 1–7–1 (.167) (NCAA); 10–12–1 (.457) (UFL)

John Joseph Morton (July 22, 1922 – December 17, 1983) was an American football player and coach. He played in the National Football League (NFL) with the Chicago Bears in 1945 and in the All-America Football Conference (AAFC) with the Los Angeles Dons in 1946 and the Buffalo Bills in 1947. Morton was the head football coach at the University of Toledo for one season, in 1956, compiling a record of 1–7–1.

== Playing career ==
Morton was a member of the Missouri Tigers football team that played in the 1942 Sugar Bowl and was a member of the 1943 All-Big Six Conference football team. He played for the 1944 Purdue Boilermakers football team as a member of the United States Navy. He was selected 84th overall in the ninth round by the Chicago Bears in the 1944 NFL draft. He played for the Bears in 1945 and signed with the Los Angeles Dons of the All-America Football Conference on February 28, 1946. He scored his only professional touchdown that year in a game against Chicago Rockets. He played two games for the Buffalo Bills in 1947.

== Coaching ==
From 1953 to 1955, Morton was the line coach at DePauw University. On February 23, 1956, he was hired for the same position at the University of Toledo. Three months later, head coach Forrest England was given a year's leave due to illness and Morton was promoted to head coach. Toledo went 1–7–1 in 1956 and both Morton and England were fired at the end of the season.

From 1957 to 1958, Morton was the defensive line coach for the Green Bay Packers of the NFL. In 1959, he returned to the college ranks as an assistant at Marquette University.

Morton was the head coach of the Grand Rapids Blazers of the United Football League in 1961 and led the team to the league championship. In 1962, he was named head coach and director of player personnel for the Jackson Panthers of the American Football Conference, but the league folded before the season began. He returned to Grand Rapids in 1963, but resigned prior to the 1964 season. He instead spent that year as the defensive coordinator of the UFL's Joliet Explorers.

== Head coaching record ==
Year	Team	Overall	Conference	Standing	Bowl/playoffs
Toledo Rockets (Mid-American Conference) (1956)
1956	Toledo	1–7–1	1–5	7th	
Toledo:		1–7–1	1–5		
Total:		1–7–1			
