= Joe Moore (running back) =

American football player (born 1949)

No. 49, 45
- Position: Running back

Personal information
- Born: June 29, 1949 (age 77); St. Louis, Missouri, U.S.
- Listed height: 6 ft 1 in (1.85 m)
- Listed weight: 205 lb (93 kg)

Career information
- High school: Beaumont (MO)
- College: Missouri
- NFL draft: 1971: 1st round, 11th overall pick

Career history
- Chicago Bears (1971–1973)

Awards and highlights
- Second-team All-American (1970); 2× Second-team All-Big Eight (1969, 1970); University of Missouri Hall of Fame (1995)

Career NFL statistics
- Rushing attempts: 87
- Rushing yards: 281
- Receptions: 5
- Receiving yards: 39
- Stats at Pro Football Reference

Joseph Lee Moore, Jr. (born June 29, 1949) is an American former professional football player who was a running back in the National Football League (NFL). He was selected in the first round (11th overall) of the 1971 NFL draft by the Chicago Bears after playing college football for Missouri Tigers.

== College career ==
At Missouri, he became the school's all-time leading rusher, and in 1969, he broke the school's record for the most rushing yards in a season with 1,312 yards. In his senior year in 1970, Moore was among the nation's top running backs in five games, rushing for 610 yards until he suffered a shoulder injury. Moore ended his college career with eleven 100-yards rushing games in his career, which remains the highest by any Missouri player, and in 1995, he was inducted into the University of Missouri Hall of Fame.

== Professional career ==
Moore's NFL career was a disappointment. He was drafted by the Chicago Bears in the first round of the 1971 NFL Draft (#11 overall). He failed to stay healthy, and thus only managed to gain 281 yards on 87 carries with no touchdowns in 23 games during two seasons with the Bears, while averaging just 3.2 yards per carry. Moore also had five receptions for 39 yards, along with a punt return for no yards. Following in the footsteps of Bears legend Gayle Sayers, Moore played in nine games in his rookie season of 1971, running for 90 yards and recording 22 receiving yards, as Chicago finished 6–8. Two years later, in his final season, Moore appeared in all 14 games, recording 191 rushing yards and 17 receiving yards, and the Bears finished with a record of 3–11.

He is considered to be one of the worst draft picks in Bear's history.

== Post-football career ==
Moore later became a track coach, and coached the Berkeley High School girls track team to a Missouri state championship in 1993.
