= Don Reece =

American football player (1919–1992)

- Reece, c. 1943

No. 46
- Position: Fullback

Personal information
- Born: December 1, 1919; Marysville, Ohio, U.S.
- Died: August 26, 1992 (aged 72); Marysville, Ohio, U.S.
- Listed height: 6 ft 1 in (1.85 m)
- Listed weight: 230 lb (104 kg)

Career information
- High school: Marysville (OH)
- College: Missouri
- NFL draft: 1943: 22nd round, 203rd overall pick

Career history
- Miami Seahawks (1946)

Awards and highlights
- First-team All-Big Six (1943); 2× Second-team All-Big Six (1941, 1942)
- Stats at Pro Football Reference

Donald Miles "Bull" Reece (December 1, 1919 – August 26, 1992) was an American football fullback.

Reece was born in Maysville, Missouri in 1919 and attended Maysville High School in that city. He played college football at Missouri. He played at the fullback position for Missouri from 1940 to 1943 and was captain of the 1942 Missouri Tigers football team that won the Big Six championship. He was also selected as a first-team player on the 1943 All-Big Six Conference football team. He also played in the 1943 East-West Shrine Game.

In 1944, he was assigned to Notre Dame as a Navy V-5 trainee.

Reece played professional football for the Miami Seahawks of the All-America Football Conference in 1946. He appeared in 13 games, four of them as the Seahawks' starting fullback. He rushed for 109 yards on 30 carries. He scored two touchdowns in a game against the New York Yankees.

He died in 1992 in Maysville, Missouri .
