= Elmer Otto Friday =

American judge and politician

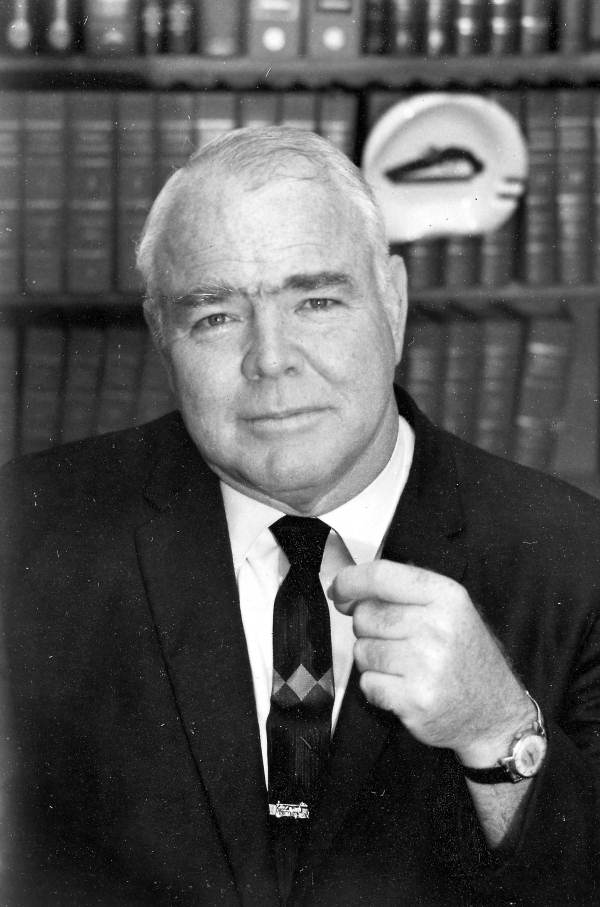
- Friday in 1970

Member of the Florida Senate from the 24th district
- In office 1962–1966

Member of the Florida Senate from the 34th district
- In office 1967–1970

Personal details
- Born: Elmer Otto Friday Jr. February 23, 1924 Polk County, Florida, U.S.
- Died: January 20, 2006 (aged 81)
- Party: Democratic
- Spouse: Betty Jo Guthrie
- Children: 4
- Education: University of Oklahoma; University of Florida
- Occupation: Judge

Elmer Otto Friday Jr. (February 23, 1924 – January 20, 2006) was an American judge and politician. He served as a Democratic member of the Florida Senate, representing the 24th and 34th districts.

Friday was born Polk County, Florida, he is the son of Mayo Yates and Elmer Otto Friday Sr. His father died at the age of 67. Friday attended Charlotte High School. He served in the United States Navy during World War II. He attended the University of Oklahoma, where he played American football as left tackle. He then attended the University of Florida, where he earned his law degree.

Friday served as a judge in Florida from 1950 to 1961. The following year, Friday was elected to represent the 24th district of the Florida Senate. He served until 1966 before being elected to represent the 34th district of the Florida Senate. He served until 1970. In the same year, Friday served as the secretary of the Florida Senate, serving until 1974. Afterwards, he served as a circuit judge in South West Florida until retirement.

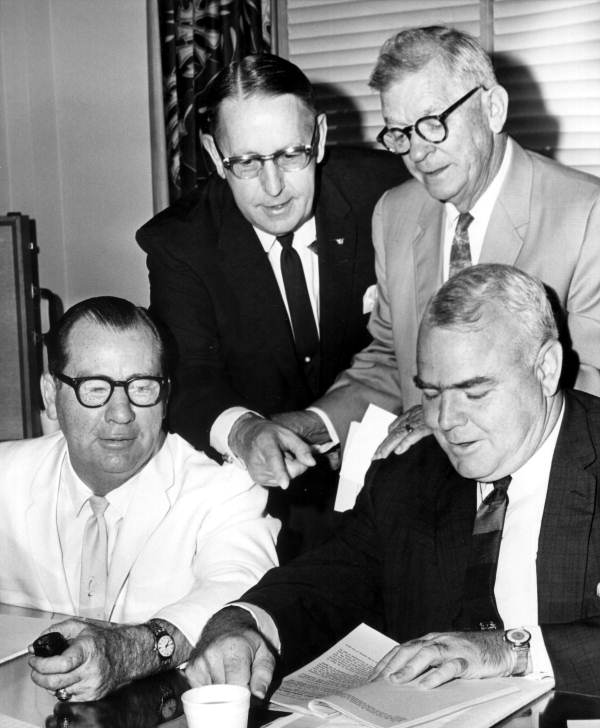
Friday (right) with J. Emory Cross, Charley Eugene Johns and Bill Pearce, 1965

Friday died in January 2006, at the age of 81.
