= Bob Nelson (center) =

American football player (1920–1986)

- Nelson, circa 1947

No. 51, 22, 28, 34
- Positions: Center, tackle, linebacker

Personal information
- Born: January 30, 1920; Paris, Texas, U.S.
- Died: November 3, 1986 (aged 66); Fort Worth, Texas, U.S.
- Listed height: 6 ft 1 in (1.85 m)
- Listed weight: 214 lb (97 kg)

Career information
- High school: Bryan (TX)
- College: Baylor
- NFL draft: 1941: 5th round, 35th overall pick

Career history
- Detroit Lions (1941, 1945); Los Angeles Dons (1946-1949); Baltimore Colts (1950); Saskatchewan Roughriders (1951)

Awards and highlights
- 12× All-Pro; 3× All-AAFC; 3× First-team (1946, 1947, 1948); 2× Associated Press; 2× Second-team (1946, 1947); 4× New York Daily News; First-team (1946); 3× Second-team (1947, 1948, 1949); 3× United Press; First-team (1946); 2× Second-team (1948, 1949); First-team All-SWC (1939)

Career NFL statistics
- Games played: 71
- Starts: 52
- Fumble recoveries: 1
- Stats at Pro Football Reference

Robert Cole "Bob" Nelson (January 30, 1920 – November 3, 1986) was an American professional football center who played a 7-year professional career (interrupted by World War II) in the National Football League (NFL) and the All-America Football Conference (AAFC).

== Biography ==
Nelson was born in Paris, Texas, in 1920 and attended Bryan High School in Bryan, Texas. He played college football at Baylor and was the first-team center on the 1939 All-Southwest Conference football team.

Nelson was drafted by the Detroit Lions in the fifth round (35th overall pick) of the 1941 NFL draft. He played for the Lions during the 1941 and 1945 seasons. He served three-and-a-half years in the Navy during World War II as a petty officer on a landing craft.

He jumped to the All-America Football Conference in 1946, playing for the Los Angeles Dons from 1946 to 1949. He concluded his career back in the NFL with the first Baltimore Colts in 1950. He appeared in 71 professional football games, 52 of them as a starter. He was selected as a first-team player on the 1946 All-Pro Team and on the 1946 All-AAFC football team.

After retiring from football, Nelson received a law degree from Baylor and worked as the Milam County Attorney and later as in-house counsel for the Federal Aviation Administration.

A resident of Granbury, Texas during his final years, Nelson died November 3, 1986 in a Fort Worth hospital.
