= Larron Jackson =

American football player (born 1949)

No. 68
- Position: Guard

Personal information
- Born: August 26, 1949 (age 77); St. Louis, Missouri, U.S.
- Listed height: 6 ft 3 in (1.91 m)
- Listed weight: 270 lb (122 kg)

Career information
- High school: Soldan (St. Louis)
- College: Missouri
- NFL draft: 1971: 4th round, 81th overall pick

Career history
- Denver Broncos (1971–1974); Atlanta Falcons (1975–1976)

Awards and highlights
- Third-team All-American (1969); 2× First-team All-Big Eight (1969, 1970)

Career NFL statistics
- Games played: 83
- Games started: 43
- Fumble recoveries: 3
- Stats at Pro Football Reference

Larron Deonne Jackson (born August 26, 1949) is an American former professional football player who was a guard in the National Football League (NFL). He played college football for the Missouri Tigers. Jackson was selected 81st overall in the fourth round of the 1971 NFL draft by the Houston Oilers. He played six seasons for the Denver Broncos and the Atlanta Falcons.
