= Bill Dellastatious =

American football player and coach (1922–2023)

Biographical details
- Born: October 2, 1922; Washington, D.C., U.S.
- Died: November 6, 2023 (aged 101)

Playing career

Football
- 1943–1945: Missouri
- Position: Quarterback

Coaching career (HC unless noted)

Football
- 1948–1952: Florida (assistant)
- 1953–1954: Southwest Missouri State

Golf
- 1949–1952: Florida

Head coaching record
- Overall: 5–12 (football)

Accomplishments and honors

Awards
- First-team All-Big Six (1944); Second-team All-Big Six (1943)

Joseph William Dellastatious (October 2, 1922 – November 6, 2023) was an American college football player and coach. He played as a quarterback with the Missouri Tigers.

== Career ==
Dellastatious played college football at the University of Missouri, where he was a quarterback. He had previously played at Clemson University and attended Bucknell and George Washington University.

Dellastatious was drafted by National Football League (NFL) teams twice. In the 1945 NFL draft, he was chosen with the 19th overall pick by the Pittsburgh Steelers. He was ruled "not yet eligible" by the NFL and the pick was forfeited. He was then properly drafted in the first round of the 1946 NFL draft by the Detroit Lions.

Despite being such a highly-sought recruit, instead of playing professional football, Dellastatious chose to take a job as an assistant coach at the University of Florida.

He went on to coach and teach at Southwest Missouri State College, the Citadel, Wake Forest University, and Salem College in West Virginia. Dellastatious served as the head football coach at Southwest Missouri State—now known as Missouri State University–from 1953 to 1954, compiling a record of 5–12.

== Personal life and death ==
Dellastatious was born in Washington D.C. on October 2, 1922. He was married to Anne Lee, who died in Jackson, Tennessee, on May 13, 2017, at the age of 87. He died on November 6, 2023, at the age of 101.

== Head coaching record ==
=== Football ===
Year	Team	Overall	Conference	Standing	Bowl/playoffs
Southwest Missouri State Bears (Missouri Intercollegiate Athletics Association) (1952–1953)
1953	Southwest Missouri State	3–6	3–2	2nd	
1954	Southwest Missouri State	2–6	1–4	T–4th	
Southwest Missouri State:		5–12	4–6		
Total:		5–12			
