= 1942 Philadelphia Eagles season =

NFL team season

- Head coach: Greasy Neale
- Home stadium: Shibe Park

Results
- Record: 2–9
- Division place: 5th NFL Eastern
- Playoffs: Did not qualify

The 1942 Philadelphia Eagles season was their tenth in the league. The team failed to improve on their previous output of 2–8–1, losing nine games. The team failed to qualify for the playoffs for the 10th consecutive season.

== Offseason ==
The Eagles held training camp for the second year at the High School Bowl, in Two Rivers, Wisconsin.

=== NFL draft ===
The 1942 NFL draft was held on December 22, 1941. The draft was 22 rounds long and each team received 20 picks for a total of 200 players. The Eagles got to select 3rd in each of the 1st 20 rounds. The top 5 teams record wise in 1941 did not get picks in rounds 2 and 4, as the lowest 5 teams do not pick in rounds 21 and 22.

With the first pick in the draft, the Pittsburgh Steelers select Bill Dudley a Halfback out of Virginia. Dudley was the first Virginia player to earn All-America honors and was awarded the Maxwell Award for best college football player of the year for 1941. He was also named the best college player of the year by the DC Touchdown Club.

The Eagles first pick was the third player in the draft, Pete Kmetovic, a Halfback from Stanford University. He would not play Pro football until 1946 for the Eagles.

=== Player selections ===
The table shows the Eagles selections and what picks they had that were traded away and the team that ended up with that pick. It is possible the Eagles' pick ended up with this team via another team that the Eagles made a trade with. Not shown are acquired picks that the Eagles traded away.

= Pro Bowler	= Hall of Famer

Rd	Pick	Player	Position	School
1	3	Pete Kmetovic	Halfback	Stanford University
2	13	Vic Lindskog	Center	Stanford University
3	18	Ted Williams	Back	Boston College
4	28	Gordon Paschka	Guard	Minnesota
5	33	Ernie Blandin	Tackle	Tulane
6	43	Earl Younglove	End	Washington
7	53	Billy Sewell	Back	Washington State
8	63	Bill Halverson	Guard	Oregon State
9	73	Ray Graves	Center	Tennessee
10	83	Jack Stackpool	Back	Washington
11	93	Noble Doss	Back	Texas
12	103	Fred Meyer	End	Stanford
13	113	Bob Brenton	Tackle	Missouri
14	123	John Wyhonic	Guard	Alabama
15	133	O'Dell Griffin	Guard	Baylor
16	143	Bill Smaltz	Back	Penn State
17	153	Arnie Meiners	End	Stanford
18	163	Bill Braun	Tackle	Santa Clara
19	173	Charley Dvoracek	Back	Texas Tech
20	183	Marv Tommervik	Back	Pacific Lutheran

== Schedule ==
Week	Date	Opponent	Result	Record	Venue	Attendance	Recap
1	September 13	at **Pittsburgh Steelers**	**W** 24–14	1–0	Forbes Field	13,349	Recap
2	September 20	at Cleveland Rams	**L** 14–24	1–1	Rubber Bowl	6,434	Recap
3	September 27	**Brooklyn Dodgers**	**L** 14–35	1–2	Erie Stadium	5,286	Recap
4	October 4	**Washington Redskins**	**L** 10–14	1–3	Shibe Park	15,500	Recap
5	October 11	at **New York Giants**	**L** 17–35	1–4	Polo Grounds	28,264	Recap
6	October 18	**Pittsburgh Steelers**	**L** 0–14	1–5	Shibe Park	12,500	Recap
7	October 25	at Chicago Bears	**L** 14–45	1–6	Wrigley Field	15,372	Recap
8	November 1	at **Washington Redskins**	**L** 27–30	1–7	Griffith Stadium	32,658	Recap
9	November 8	**New York Giants**	**L** 0–14	1–8	Shibe Park	13,600	Recap
10	November 15	**Brooklyn Dodgers**	**W** 14–7	2–8	Ebbets Field	3,858	Recap
11	Bye						
12	November 29	Green Bay Packers	**L** 0–7	2–9	Shibe Park	13,700	Recap
Note: Intra-division opponents are in **bold** text.

On November 22, during their bye week, the Eagles tied the independent Wilmington Clippers 21–21 at Wilmington Park before 8,500 fans.

== Standings ==
NFL Eastern Division
	W	L	T	PCT	DIV	PF	PA	STK
Washington Redskins	10	1	0	.909	7–1	227	102	W9
Pittsburgh Steelers	7	4	0	.636	5–3	167	119	L1
New York Giants	5	5	1	.500	4–4	155	139	W2
Brooklyn Dodgers	3	8	0	.273	2–6	100	168	L6
Philadelphia Eagles	2	9	0	.182	2–6	134	239	L1

Note: Tie games were not officially counted in the standings until 1972.

== Roster ==
(All time List of Philadelphia Eagles players in franchise history)

= 1942 Pro All-Star

NO.″	Player	AGE	POS	GP	GS	WT	HT	YRS	College
	Greasy Neale	51	Coach	_{1941 record} 2–9	_{NFL-Eagles; Lifetime} 4–17–1			2nd	West Virginia Wesleyan
	Len Barnum *	30	B	10	5	200	6–0	4	West Virginia Wesleyan
	John Binotto	23	HB	2	0	185	5–10	Rookie	Duquesne
	Leo Brennan	23	T	11	2	210	6–0	Rookie	Holy Cross
	Larry Cabrelli	25	E-DB	11	11	194	5–11	1	Colgate
	Bill Combs	22	E-DB	10	0	183	5–11	Rookie	Purdue
	Enio Conti	29	G	11	10	204	5–11	1	_{Arkansas, and Bucknell}
	Leon Cook	22	T	2	0	245	6–0	Rookie	Northwestern
	Bob Davis	28	HB-FBQB-P	10	6	180	6–1	4	Kentucky
	John Eibner	28	T	10	7	228	6–2	1	Kentucky
	Dick Erdlitz	22	HB	10	1	181	5–10	Rookie	Northwestern
	Joe Frank	27	T	1	0	217	6–1	1	Georgetown (DC)
	Woody Gerber	22	G	11	9	223	6–0	1	Alabama
	Ray Graves	24	C	11	6	205	6–1	Rookie	_{Tennessee, and Tennessee Wesleyan}
	Irv Hall	29	FB	8	3	210	6–0	Rookie	Brown
	Bill Halverson	23	T	8	0	242	6–3	Rookie	Oregon State
	Ken Hayden	25	C	9	5	205	6–0	Rookie	Arkansas
	Frank Hrabetin	27	T	7	1	233	6–4	Rookie	Loyola Marymount
	Billy Jefferson	24	HB	5	0	208	6–2	1	Mississippi State
	Bert Johnson	30	FB-BB-HB	7	3	212	6–0	5	Kentucky
	Bernie Kaplan	29	G	3	0	195	5–11	7	Western Maryland
	Ed Kasky	23	T	10	3	220	6–1	Rookie	Villanova
	Jim Lankas	24	B	1	0	220	6–2	Rookie	St. Mary's (CA)
	Steve Levanitis	22	T	5	0	220	6–1	Rookie	Boston College
	Basilio Marchi	33	G-C	7	1	220	6–2	8	NYU
	Bob Masters	31	HB	3	0	200	5–11	5	Baylor
	Fred Meyer	23	E-DE	10	10	190	6–2	Rookie	Stanford
	Bert Milling	21	G	2	0	185	5–10	Rookie	Richmond
	Rupert Pate	25	G	7	0	205	6–1	2	Wake Forest
	Bob Priestley	22	E	9	0	192	5–11	Rookie	Brown
	Bosh Pritchard	23	HB	6	4	164	5–11	Rookie	_{Georgia Tech, and VMI}
	Vic Sears	24	T-DT	11	11	223	6–3	1	Oregon State
	Jack Smith	25	DE-E	6	0	200	6–1	Rookie	Stanford
	Jack Stackpool	25	FB	8	4	207	6–1	Rookie	Washington
	Ernie Steele	25	HB-DB	10	1	187	6–0	Rookie	Washington
	Len Supulski	22	E	9	0	175	6–0	Rookie	Dickinson
	Al Thacker	23	G	3	0	200	5–10	Rookie	Morris Harvey College, Charleston (WV)
	Tommy Thompson	26	QB	11	10	192	6–1	2	Tulsa
	Lou Tomasetti	26	FB-HB	10	5	198	6–0	3	Bucknell
	Bob Wear	23	C-LB	3	0	205	5–11	Rookie	_{Penn State, and Sacramento State}
	Ted Williams	26	B	11	2	183	5–11	Rookie	_{Boston College, and Notre Dame}
	Tex Williams	23	C-LB	5	0	193	5–11	Rookie	Auburn
	40 Players; Team Average	25		11		203.4	6–0.3	1.1	
