= 1942 NFL All-Star Game (December) =

National Football League all-star game

Washington Redskins	NFL All-Stars
14	17
Head coach: Ray Flaherty (Washington Redskins)	Head coach: Hunk Anderson (Chicago Bears)
	1	2	3	4	Total
Washington Redskins	7	0	7	0	14
NFL All-Stars	0	0	14	3	17
- Date: December 27, 1942
- Stadium: Shibe Park; Philadelphia, Pennsylvania
- MVP: none selected
- Attendance: 18,671

TV in the United States
- Network: not televised

The 1942 National Football League All-Star Game (December) was the National Football League's fifth all-star game. The game pitted the Washington Redskins, the league's champion for the 1942 season, against a team of all-stars. The game was played on Sunday, December 27, 1942, at Shibe Park in Philadelphia, Pennsylvania in front of 18,671 fans. The All-Stars defeated the Redskins by a score of 17–14.

Due to World War II, the All-Star Game was canceled following 1942 as travel restrictions were imposed. It would not return until 1951 as the Pro Bowl, with the champions vs. all-stars format changed to between divisions to avoid confusion with the Chicago College All-Star Game.

== Pre-game ==
The All-Star team was coached by Chicago Bears head coach Hunk Anderson while Ray Flaherty led his Washington Redskins. Anderson and assistant coach Luke Johnsos elected to run the T formation after the players voted for the system, though they also implemented the Notre Dame Box as Green Bay Packers and All-Star quarterback Cecil Isbell excelled in such an offense.

The All-Star roster was decided by fan vote, though some players did not participate for various reasons. Packers receiver Don Hutson missed the game due to a chest injury and a cold, though he had initially announced his intention to play and was only permitted to kick extra points. Pittsburgh Steelers tackle Milt Simington suffered a heart attack during practice for the game and was forced to retire.

Redskins players Willie Wilkin and Dick Todd also skipped the game, the former having to report for military service. Quarterback Sammy Baugh was sick with the flu and failed to make his flight to Philadelphia for the game, which prompted NFL Commissioner Elmer Layden to launch an investigation into the matter. According to a league official: "from all we know Baugh might have had a legitimate excuse for not showing up. But so far we can find no legitimate reason for his not notifying us that he could not or was not coming". Baugh said the car that was supposed to take him from his Rotan, Texas home to a Dallas airport failed to materialize on time.

Baugh's disappearance was allegedly condemned by his teammates, with a Detroit Free Press report claiming some players said he would "never be forgiven for failing to appear." A "spokesman for the players" told the New York Daily News, "We were determined to win this game to prove that our victory over the Bears was no fluke. [...] We wanted to win this one as much as the playoff. And Sammy doesn't show up. Hell, suppose all of us did that? There wouldn't have been any game, and there wouldn't have been any money for the seamen."

Washington owner George Preston Marshall and Bears player Lee Artoe defended Baugh, the former suggesting his illness prevented him from traveling, while Artoe accused the NFL of poor scheduling for placing the game in a "bad sports town" like Philadelphia and in late December.

Layden ended the case on January 20, 1943 with no punishment imposed on Baugh, concluding he was indeed sick and was unable to reach Dallas in time. In a league statement, Layden considered "the publicity and subsequent investigation attendant upon Baugh's failure to appear in Philadelphia" to be "sufficient punishment under the circumstances."

== Game ==
With the ongoing war, the game raised $75,000 for the United Seaman's Fund, while the game ball was auctioned at halftime to sell war bonds, raising $90,170 (the winning bid was $31,000).

The Redskins scored first with Ki Aldrich's 30-yard punt return touchdown in the first quarter. After a scoreless second quarter, Bill Dudley of the Steelers intercepted a pass and returned it 97 yards to tie the game. Later in the quarter, Fred Davis went offside and collided with Bears quarterback Sid Luckman, sparking a fight with Artoe that led to Davis being ejected from the game. The next play, the Bears' John Petty recorded a two-yard rushing touchdown, which the Redskins answered on Roy Zimmerman's 15-yard touchdown throw to Bob Seymour.

Early in the fourth quarter, Artoe kicked a 43-yard field goal to put the All-Stars ahead 17–14. Washington's Bob Masterson attempted to tie the game with seconds remaining, but his 27-yard kick was wide. The win was the first for the All-Stars in the game's history.

== Rosters ==
The rosters consisted of the following:

=== NFL All-Stars roster ===
Position:	Starters:	Reserves:
Quarterback	Tommy Thompson, Philadelphia Eagles	Larry Craig, Green Bay Packers; Sid Luckman, Chicago Bears
Left Halfback	Bill Dudley, Pittsburgh Steelers	Cecil Isbell, Green Bay Packers
Right Halfback	Merl Condit, Brooklyn Dodgers	Dante Magnani, Cleveland Rams; Bosh Pritchard, Philadelphia Eagles
Fullback	Harry Hopp, Detroit Lions	Gary Famiglietti, Chicago Bears; Frank Maznicki, Chicago Bears; John Petty, Chicago Bears; Marshall Goldberg, Chicago Bears^{a} Dick Riffle, Pittsburgh Steelers^{a}
Left End	Perry Schwartz, Brooklyn Dodgers	George Wilson, Chicago Bears; Don Hutson, Green Bay Packers^{a}
Right End	Eddie Rucinski, Brooklyn Dodgers	Pop Ivy, Chicago Cardinals; John Siegal, Chicago Bears
Left Tackle	John Woudenberg, Pittsburgh Steelers	Al Blozis, New York Giants; Frank "Bruiser" Kinard, Brooklyn Dodgers; Vic Sears, Philadelphia Eagles^{a}
Right Tackle	Chet Adams, Cleveland Rams	Lee Artoe, Chicago Bears; Ed Kolman, Chicago Bears; Frank Cope, New York Giants^{a}
Left Guard	Augie Lio, Detroit Lions	Dan Fortmann, Chicago Bears; Milt Simington, Pittsburgh Steelers^{a}
Right Guard	Enio Conti, Philadelphia Eagles	Chuck Drulis, Chicago Bears
Center	Chuck Cherundolo, Pittsburgh Steelers	Charley Brock, Green Bay Packers; Clyde "Bulldog" Turner, Chicago Bears^{a}

=== Washington Redskins roster ===
Position:	Starters:	Reserves:
Quarterback	Ray Hare	Cecil Hare; Wilbur Moore; Dick Poillon; Bob Seymour
Left Halfback	Roy Zimmerman	Cecil Hare; Wilbur Moore; Dick Poillon; Bob Seymour
Right Halfback	Ed Justice	Cecil Hare; Wilbur Moore; Dick Poillon; Bob Seymour
Fullback	Andy Farkas	Cecil Hare; Wilbur Moore; Dick Poillon; Bob Seymour
Left End	Bob Masterson	Bob McChesney
Right End	Ed Cifers	Bob McChesney
Left Tackle	Fred Davis	Willie Wilkin
Right Tackle	Bill Young	Willie Wilkin
Left Guard	Dick Farman	Victor Carroll; Clem Stralka
Right Guard	Steve Slivinski	Victor Carroll; Clem Stralka
Center	Ki Aldrich	George Smith

Roster Notes:

^{a} Injured player; selected but did not play
