= 1942 Washington Redskins season =

NFL team season

- Owner: George Preston Marshall
- General manager: Jack Espey
- Head coach: Ray Flaherty
- Home stadium: Griffith Stadium

Results
- Record: 10–1
- Division place: 1st NFL Eastern
- Playoffs: Won NFL Championship (vs. Bears) 14–6

The 1942 Washington Redskins season was the franchise's 11th season in the National Football League (NFL) and their 6th in Washington, D.C. Finishing at 10–1 The team improved on their 6–5 record from 1941. They would end the season by winning the NFL Championship against the Chicago Bears, 14–6.

== Regular season ==
=== Schedule ===
Game	Date	Opponent	Result	Record	Venue	Attendance	Recap	Sources
1	September 20	**Pittsburgh Steelers**	**W** 28–14	1–0	Griffith Stadium	25,000	Recap	
2	September 27	**New York Giants**	**L** 7–14	1–1	Griffith Stadium	34,700	Recap	
3	October 4	at **Philadelphia Eagles**	**W** 14–10	2–1	Shibe Park	15,500	Recap	
4	October 11	Cleveland Rams	**W** 33–14	3–1	Griffith Stadium	33,250	Recap	
5	October 18	at **Brooklyn Dodgers**	**W** 21–10	4–1	Ebbets Field	25,635	Recap	
6	October 25	at **Pittsburgh Steelers**	**W** 14–0	5–1	Forbes Field	37,764	Recap	
7	November 1	**Philadelphia Eagles**	**W** 30–27	6–1	Griffith Stadium	32,658	Recap	
8	November 8	Chicago Cardinals	**W** 28–0	7–1	Griffith Stadium	35,425	Recap	
9	November 15	at **New York Giants**	**W** 14–7	8–1	Polo Grounds	30,879	Recap	
10	November 22	**Brooklyn Dodgers**	**W** 23–3	9–1	Griffith Stadium	34,450	Recap	
11	November 29	at Detroit Lions	**W** 15–3	10–1	Briggs Stadium	6,044	Recap	
Note: Intra-division opponents are in **bold** text.

== Standings ==
NFL Eastern Division
	W	L	T	PCT	DIV	PF	PA	STK
Washington Redskins	10	1	0	.909	7–1	227	102	W9
Pittsburgh Steelers	7	4	0	.636	5–3	167	119	L1
New York Giants	5	5	1	.500	4–4	155	139	W2
Brooklyn Dodgers	3	8	0	.273	2–6	100	168	L6
Philadelphia Eagles	2	9	0	.182	2–6	134	239	L1

Note: Tie games were not officially counted in the standings until 1972.

== Postseason ==
=== NFL Championship Game ===
Round	Date	Opponent	Result	Venue	Attendance	Recap	Sources
Championship	December 13	Chicago Bears	W 14–6	Griffith Stadium	36,006	Recap	

=== All-Star Game ===
Round	Date	Opponent	Result
All-Star Game	December 27	All-Stars	L 14–17

== Roster ==
Official team photo of the World Champion 1942 Washington Redskins.

1942 Washington Redskins final roster
Backs: 33 Sammy Baugh RB/CB/P; 53 Rufus Deal LB/FB; 44 Andy Farkas FB/LB/K; 11 Cecil Hare RB/CB/S; 42 Ray Hare RB/CB/S; 13 Ed Justice RB/CB; 35 Wilbur Moore RB/CB; 25 Dick Poillon RB/CB/S/P/K; 20 Bob Seymour FB/LB; 41 Dick Todd FB/LB/P/K; 48 Marvin Whited RB/CS; 22 Roy Zimmerman RB/CB/P	Linemen/Linebackers: 38 Ki Aldrich C/LB; 45 Ed Beinor T/DT; 26 Vic Carroll G/DG; 17 Fred Davis T/DT; 21 Dick Farman G/DG; 51 Clyde Shugart G/DG; 16 Steve Slivinski G/DG; 47 George Smith C/LB; 39 Clem Stralka G/DG; 18 Bob Titchenal C/LB; 15 George Watts T/DT; 36 Willie Wilkin T/DT; 37 Bill Young T/DT; 27 Joe Zeno G/DG	Ends/Receivers: 43 Ed Cifers; 40 John Kovatch; 14 Al Krueger; 19 Charley Malone; 28 Bob Masterson K; 32 Bob McChesney; rookies in italics
