= 1942 Pittsburgh Steelers season =

NFL team season

- Owner: Art Rooney, Bert Bell
- Head coach: Walt Kiesling
- Home stadium: Forbes Field

Results
- Record: 7–4
- Division place: 2nd NFL Eastern
- Playoffs: Did not qualify
- Pro Bowlers: Chuck Cherundolo; Bill Dudley; Milt Simington; John Woudenberg

The 1942 Pittsburgh Steelers season was the franchise's 10th season in the National Football League (NFL). The team improved on their previous season result of 1–9–1 with a record of 7–4–0, which was good enough for 2nd place in the NFL East. This was the franchise's first ever winning record.

For the second straight year, the team held training camp in Hershey, Pennsylvania.

== Regular season ==
=== Schedule ===
Week	Date	Opponent	Result	Record
1	September 13	Philadelphia Eagles	L 14–24	0–1
2	September 20	at Washington Redskins	L 14–28	0–2
3	October 4	New York Giants	W 13–10	1–2
4	October 11	at Brooklyn Dodgers	W 7–0	2–2
5	October 18	at Philadelphia Eagles	W 14–0	3–2
6	October 25	Washington Redskins	L 0–14	3–3
7	November 1	at New York Giants	W 17–9	4–3
8	November 8	at Detroit Lions	W 35–7	5–3
9	November 22	Chicago Cardinals	W 19–3	6–3
10	November 29	Brooklyn Dodgers	W 13–0	7–3
11	December 6	at Green Bay Packers	L 21–24	7–4

The 1942 Steeler Team was the best team the club had up to that point. For the first time in 10 seasons, the Steelers had a 4-game winning streak. The team finished with a 7–4 record and looked forward to the next season. However, due to the loss of players in the US draft, the team was forced to combine operation with the cross-state rival, Philadelphia Eagles. This would be one of the first times the Steelers felt that fate interrupted the future success that was expected. The Steelers wouldn't post another winning season until 1947, even then, their future was interrupted by fate.

=== Game summaries ===
==== Week 1 (Sunday September 13, 1942): Philadelphia Eagles ====
	1	2	3	4	Total
Eagles	7	7	3	7	24
Steelers	7	0	0	7	14

at Forbes Field, Pittsburgh, Pennsylvania

- Game time:
- Game weather:
- Game attendance: 13,349
- Referee:

Scoring Drives:

- Pittsburgh – Dudley 44 run (Binotto kick)
- Philadelphia – Davis 3 run (Barnum kick)
- Philadelphia – Supulski 41 pass from Thompson (Graves kick)
- Philadelphia – FG Barnum 24
- Philadelphia - Meyer 12 pass from Thompson (Barnum kick)
- Pittsburgh – Looney 24 pass from Dudley

==== Week 2 (Sunday, September 20, 1942): Washington Redskins ====
	1	2	3	4	Total
Steelers	0	0	14	0	14
Redskins	0	7	7	14	28

at Griffith Stadium, Washington, DC

- Game time:
- Game weather:
- Game attendance: 25,000
- Referee:

Scoring Drives:

- Washington – Juzwik 2 run (Juzwik kick)
- Pittsburgh – Dudley 84 kick return (Sanders kick)
- Pittsburgh – Riffle 1 run (Sanders kick)
- Washington – Aldrich 50 blocked field goal return (Juzwik kick)
- Washington – Juzwik 39 run (Juzwik kick)
- Washington – Justice 3 pass from Baugh

==== Week 4 (Sunday October 4, 1942): New York Giants ====
	1	2	3	4	Total
Giants	3	7	0	0	10
Steelers	0	6	0	7	13

at Forbes Field, Pittsburgh, Pennsylvania

- Game time:
- Game weather:
- Game attendance: 9,600
- Referee:

Scoring Drives:

- New York – FG Cuff 37
- New York – Hapes 15 pass from Leemans (Cuff kick)
- Pittsburgh – Hoague 3 run (kick failed)
- Pittsburgh – Sandig 4 run (Niccolai kick)

==== Week 5 (Sunday October 11, 1942): Brooklyn Dodgers ====
	1	2	3	4	Total
Steelers	0	7	0	0	7
Dodgers	0	0	0	0	0

at Ebbets Field, Brooklyn, New York

- Game time:
- Game weather:
- Game attendance: 17,689
- Referee:

Scoring Drives:

- Pittsburgh – Dudley 7 run (Niccolai kick)

==== Week 6 (Sunday October 18, 1942): Philadelphia Eagles ====
	1	2	3	4	Total
Steelers	0	0	7	7	14
Eagles	0	0	0	0	0

at Shibe Park, Philadelphia, Pennsylvania

- Game time:
- Game weather:
- Game attendance: 12,500
- Referee:

Scoring Drives:

- Pittsburgh – Sandig 39 run (Niccolai kick)
- Pittsburgh – Riffle 1 run (Niccolai kick)

==== Week 7 (Sunday October 25, 1942): Washington Redskins ====
	1	2	3	4	Total
Redskins	0	7	7	0	14
Steelers	0	0	0	0	0

at Forbes Field, Pittsburgh, Pennsylvania

- Game time:
- Game weather:
- Game attendance: 37,746
- Referee:

Scoring Drives:

- Washington – Todd 3 pass from Baugh (Masterson kick)
- Washington – Cifers 9 blocked punt return (Masterson kick)

==== Week 8 (Sunday November 1, 1942): New York Giants ====
	1	2	3	4	Total
Steelers	0	10	0	7	17
Giants	3	0	0	6	9

at Polo Grounds, New York, New York

- Game time:
- Game weather:
- Game attendance: 19,346
- Referee:

Scoring Drives:

- New York Giants – FG Cuff 18
- Pittsburgh – Sandig 64 punt return (Niccolai kick)
- Pittsburgh – FG Simington 16
- New York Giants – Cuff 35 pass from Cantor (Cuff kick)
- Pittsburgh – Dudley 66 run (Niccolai kick)

==== Week 9 (Sunday November 8, 1942): Detroit Lions ====
	1	2	3	4	Total
Steelers	0	14	14	7	35
Lions	7	0	0	0	7

at Briggs Stadium, Detroit, Michigan

- Game time:
- Game weather:
- Game attendance: 16,473
- Referee:

Scoring Drives:

- Detroit – Hackney run (Lio kick)
- Pittsburgh – Sandig 8 run (Niccolai kick)
- Pittsburgh – Brown 9 lateral from Kichefski after 15 pass from Dudley (Sanders kick)
- Pittsburgh – Dudley 37 run (Sanders kick)
- Pittsburgh – Riffle 1 run (Sanders kick)
- Pittsburgh – Lamas 29 fumble run (Sommers kick)

==== Week 10 (Sunday November 22, 1942): Chicago Cardinals ====
	1	2	3	4	Total
Cardinals	3	0	0	0	3
Steelers	7	3	0	9	19

at Forbes Field, Pittsburgh, Pennsylvania

- Game time:
- Game weather:
- Game attendance: 20,711
- Referee:

Scoring Drives:

- Chicago Cardinals – FG Daddio 38
- Pittsburgh – Riffle 44 run (Sanders kick)
- Pittsburgh – FG Niccolai 22
- Pittsburgh – FG Nicolai 30
- Pittsburgh – Gonda 27 run (kick failed)

==== Week 11 (Sunday November 29, 1942): Brooklyn Dodgers ====
	1	2	3	4	Total
Dodgers	0	0	0	0	0
Steelers	0	7	0	6	13

at Forbes Field, Pittsburgh, Pennsylvania

- Game time:
- Game weather:
- Game attendance: 4,593
- Referee:

Scoring Drives:

- Pittsburgh – Tomasic 52 punt return (Niccolai kick)
- Pittsburgh – Gonda 68 run (kick failed)

==== Week 12 (Sunday December 6, 1942): Green Bay Packers ====
	1	2	3	4	Total
Steelers	0	0	7	14	21
Packers	7	3	0	14	24

at Wisconsin State Fair Park, Milwaukee, Wisconsin

- Game time:
- Game weather:
- Game attendance: 5,138
- Referee:

Scoring Drives:

- Green Bay – Brock 20 pass from Isbell (Hutson kick)
- Green Bay – FG Hutson 20
- Pittsburgh – Martin 53 lateral from Riffle after run (Niccolai kick)
- Green Bay – Jacunski 49 pass from Isbell (Hutson kick)
- Green Bay – Rucinski 24 pass from Isbell (Hutson kick)
- Pittsburgh – Dudley 3 run (Simington kick)
- Pittsburgh – Martin 24 pass from Dudley (Sanders kick)

== Roster ==
1942 Pittsburgh Steelers final roster
Backs: 5 John Binotto RB/S; 33 Al Donelli RB/CB; 3 Al Tomasic TB/DB; 17 Joe Hoague FB/LB/P; 30 George Gonde RB/CB; 25 Joe Naioti RB/CB/P; 40 Mike Rodak BB-G; 10 Russ Cotton QB; 15 Vern Martin BB; 22 Dick Riffle FB/LB/P; 34 Hubbard Law HB; 35 Bill Dudley TB	Linemen/Linebackers: 46 Art Albrecht T/G/LB; 20 George Sirochman G; 42 Chuck Cherundolo C/LB; 29 Joe Lamas G; 28 Ted Doyle T/DT; 44 Jack Sanders G; 37 Clure Mosher G/C/LB; 5 Armand Niccolai T/DT/K; 55 Milt Simington G/DG/K; 24 John Schiechl C/LB; 48 Elbie Schultz G/DG/T/DT; 38 Frank Pastin G/DG; 36 John Woudenberg T/DT	Ends/Receivers: 50 Hal Hinte; 45 Walt Kichefski; 32 Tom Brown; 41 Tony Bova E; 30 Don Looney E; 22 Ralph Wenzel E; Rookies in italics

== Standings ==
NFL Eastern Division
	W	L	T	PCT	DIV	PF	PA	STK
Washington Redskins	10	1	0	.909	7–1	227	102	W9
Pittsburgh Steelers	7	4	0	.636	5–3	167	119	L1
New York Giants	5	5	1	.500	4–4	155	139	W2
Brooklyn Dodgers	3	8	0	.273	2–6	100	168	L6
Philadelphia Eagles	2	9	0	.182	2–6	134	239	L1

Note: Tie games were not officially counted in the standings until 1972.
