= Milt Simington =

American football player (1918–1943)

No. 33, 55
- Positions: Guard, placekicker

Personal information
- Born: August 26, 1918; Dierks, Arkansas, U.S.
- Died: January 17, 1943 (aged 24); Shreveport, Louisiana, U.S.
- Listed height: 6 ft 2 in (1.88 m)
- Listed weight: 217 lb (98 kg)

Career information
- High school: Idabel (Idabel, Oklahoma); Dierks
- College: Arkansas (1937-1940)
- NFL draft: 1941: 9th round, 74th overall pick

Career history
- Cleveland Rams (1941); Pittsburgh Steelers (1942)

Awards and highlights
- Pro Bowl (1942); Second-team All-SWC (1939)

Career NFL statistics
- Games: 18
- Games started: 11
- Field goals attempted: 1
- Field goals made: 1
- Extra points attempted: 3
- Extra points made: 2
- Stats at Pro Football Reference

Milton Richard Simington (August 26, 1918 – January 17, 1943) was an American professional football guard who played two seasons in the National Football League (NFL) for the Cleveland Rams and Pittsburgh Steelers. He was selected to the NFL All-Star team in 1942.

== Playing career ==
Simington played college football at the University of Arkansas before being selected by the Cleveland Rams in the 1941 NFL draft. In August 1942, he was traded along with Johnny Binotto by the Rams to the Pittsburgh Steelers in exchange for George Platukis.

Simington was selected for the NFL All-Star team based on his performance during the 1942 NFL season, but he suffered a mild heart attack during practices for the game which ended his playing career. He suffered a second heart attack a few weeks later which proved fatal; he died in Shreveport, Louisiana, on January 17, 1943, at the age of 24. At the time of his death he had been planning to enter officer training school.
