= 1942 Brooklyn Dodgers (NFL) season =

National Football League team season

1942 Brooklyn Dodgers season
- Owner: Dan Topping
- Head coach: Mike Getto
- Home stadium: Ebbets Field

Results
- Record: 3–8
- Division place: 4th NFL Eastern
- Playoffs: Did not qualify

The 1942 Brooklyn Dodgers season was their 13th in the league. The Dodgers failed to improve on their previous season's output of 7–4, winning only three games. Brooklyn failed to qualify for the playoffs for the 11th consecutive season and were shut out in five of their eleven games.

== 1942 NFL draft ==
The Dodgers had 20 total selections in the draft. Their first round selection was USC running back Bobby Robertson. The Dodgers also selected Kansas end Ralph Miller. Miller would decline to play in the NFL and would eventually go on to a Hall of Fame career coaching college basketball, which he also played at Kansas.

== Schedule ==
Week	Date	Opponent	Result	Record	Venue
1	Bye				
2	Bye				
3	September 27	at **Philadelphia Eagles**	**W** 35–14	1–0	Erie Stadium
4	October 4	at Detroit Lions	**W** 28–7	2–0	Briggs Stadium
5	October 11	**Pittsburgh Steelers**	**L** 0–7	2–1	Ebbets Field
6	October 18	**Washington Redskins**	**L** 10–21	2–2	Ebbets Field
7	October 25	**New York Giants**	**W** 17–7	3–2	Ebbets Field
8	November 1	Cleveland Rams	**L** 0–17	3–3	Ebbets Field
9	November 8	Chicago Bears	**L** 0–35	3–4	Ebbets Field
10	November 15	**Philadelphia Eagles**	**L** 7–14	3–5	Ebbets Field
11	November 22	at **Washington Redskins**	**L** 3–23	3–6	Griffith Stadium
12	November 29	at **Pittsburgh Steelers**	**L** 0–13	3–7	Forbes Field
13	December 6	at **New York Giants**	**L** 0–10	3–8	Polo Grounds
Note: Intra-division opponents are in **bold** text.

== Roster ==
1942 Brooklyn Dodgers final roster
**Backs**: 66 Wendell Butcher RB/S; 35 Merl Condit RB/CB/K; 10 Walt Fedora FB/LB; 22 Bob Gifford RB/S; 1 Thurmon Jones FB/LB; 9 Pug Manders FB/LB; 60 Dean McAdams RB/CB/P; 7 Hal McCullough RB/CB/P; 20 Curt Mecham RB/CB; 30 Mike Nixon RB/CB; 4 Bobby Robertson RB/CB; 16 Jack Vetter FB/LB	**Linemen/Linebackers**: 24 Bob Jeffries G/DG; 8 Art Jocher G/DG; 17 Mike Jurich T/DT; 3 Bernie Kapitansky G/DG; 15 Duece Keahy T/DT; 25 Bruiser Kinard T/DT/K; 29 Walt Merrill T/DT; 5 Don Pierce C/LB; 14 Tom Robertson C/LB; 18 Bud Svendsen C/LB; 2 Si Titus C/LB; 33 Bernie Weiner G/DG	**Ends/Receivers**: 13 Herman Hodges; 26 Eddie Rucinski; 99 Perry Schwartz; 32 Joe Tofil; **Reserve**: 31 Gerry Courtney T/DT; 18 Art Deremer C/LB; 15 Don Eliason E; 27 George Kinard G/DG; 28 Jim Sivell G/DG; -- Leo Stasica RB/CB (Military); Rookies in italics

== Standings ==
NFL Eastern Division
	W	L	T	PCT	DIV	PF	PA	STK
Washington Redskins	10	1	0	.909	7–1	227	102	W9
Pittsburgh Steelers	7	4	0	.636	5–3	167	119	L1
New York Giants	5	5	1	.500	4–4	155	139	W2
Brooklyn Dodgers	3	8	0	.273	2–6	100	168	L6
Philadelphia Eagles	2	9	0	.182	2–6	134	239	L1

Note: Tie games were not officially counted in the standings until 1972.
