= Bob Priestley =

Bob Priestley may refer to:

- Robert Priestley (1901–1986), American set decorator
- Bob Priestley (American football) (1920–2015), American football end
