= Marvin Whited =

American football player (1918–1957)

Marv Whited
No. 48, 45
- Position: Guard

Personal information
- Born: July 26, 1918; Crowell, Texas, U.S.
- Died: June 13, 1957 (aged 38)
- Listed height: 5 ft 10 in (1.78 m)
- Listed weight: 208 lb (94 kg)

Career information
- High school: Hollis (OK)
- College: Oklahoma (1938–1941)
- NFL draft: 1942: 15th round, 136th overall pick

Career history
- Washington Redskins (1942, 1945)

Awards and highlights
- NFL champion (1942); Pro Bowl (1942)

Career NFL statistics
- Games played: 15
- Games started: 6
- Fumble recoveries: 1
- Interceptions: 1
- Stats at Pro Football Reference

Marvin Eugene Whited Jr. (July 26, 1918 – June 13, 1957) was an American professional football player who was a guard in the National Football League (NFL) for the Washington Redskins. He played college football at the University of Oklahoma and was selected in the 15th round of the 1942 NFL draft.
