= John Petty (American football) =

American football player (1918–1979)

No. 10
- Position: Fullback

Personal information
- Born: October 3, 1918; Lebanon, Pennsylvania, U.S.
- Died: April 5, 1979 (aged 60); Wilmington, Ohio, U.S.
- Listed height: 6 ft 1 in (1.85 m)
- Listed weight: 228 lb (103 kg)

Career information
- High school: Lebanon
- College: Purdue (1938-1941)
- NFL draft: 1942: 9th round, 80th overall pick

Career history
- Chicago Bears (1942)

Awards and highlights
- Pro Bowl (1942)

Career NFL statistics
- Rushing yards: 149
- Rushing average: 3.6
- Receptions: 4
- Receiving yards: 53
- Total touchdowns: 2
- Stats at Pro Football Reference

John Petty (October 3, 1918 – April 5, 1979) was a professional American football fullback in the National Football League (NFL). He played one season for the Chicago Bears (1942).
