= Bullet Bill =

Bullet Bill may refer to

- Bullet Bill (Mario), an enemy in the Mario franchise
- Bill Dudley (1921–2010), professional American football player
