= Bill Halverson =

Bill Halverson may refer to:

- Bill Halverson (American football) (1919-1984), American football tackle
- Bill Halverson (producer) (born 1942), American record producer
