= 1942 NFL All-Star Game =

1942 NFL All-Star Game may refer to:

- 1942 NFL All-Star Game (January), played after the conclusion of the 1941 NFL season
- 1942 NFL All-Star Game (December), played after the conclusion of the 1942 NFL season
