= Dick Farman =

American football player (1916–2002)

- Farman as a collegian in 1937

No. 20, 21
- Position: Offensive lineman

Personal information
- Born: July 26, 1916; Belmond, Iowa, U.S.
- Died: May 5, 2002 (aged 85); Seattle, Washington, U.S.
- Listed height: 6 ft 0 in (1.83 m)
- Listed weight: 219 lb (99 kg)

Career information
- High school: Kent (Kent, Washington)
- College: Washington State (1935-1938)
- NFL draft: 1939: 16th round, 148th overall pick

Career history
- Washington Redskins (1939–1943)

Awards and highlights
- NFL champion (1942); Consensus first-team All-Pro (1943); Pro Bowl (1942); Second-team All-PCC (1938)

Career NFL statistics
- Games played: 49
- Starts: 28
- Interceptions: 1
- Stats at Pro Football Reference

Richard George Farman (July 26, 1916 – May 5, 2002) was an American professional football offensive lineman in the National Football League (NFL) for the Washington Redskins. He played college football at Washington State University and was drafted in the sixteenth round of the 1939 NFL draft.

Farman was selected for the NFL's All-Star game in 1942 and was tapped as one of the two best guards in the league by both the Associated Press and United Press in 1943. He was part of the 1942 Redskins team that won the NFL's 1942 Championship Game.
