= 1942 Cleveland Rams season =

NFL team season

- Owner: Dan Reeves
- Head coach: Earl "Dutch" Clark
- Home stadium: League Park

Results
- Record: 5–6
- Division place: 3rd NFL Western
- Playoffs: Did not qualify

The 1942 Cleveland Rams season was the team's sixth year with the National Football League and seventh season in Cleveland, Ohio, United States.

This would be the team's last season until 1944 due to a one year hiatus associated with World War II.

== Schedule ==
Week	Date	Opponent	Result	Record	Venue	Attendance	Recap
1	September 13	at **Chicago Cardinals**	**L** 0–7	0–1	Civic Stadium	18,698	Recap
2	September 20	Philadelphia Eagles	**W** 24–14	1–1	Rubber Bowl	6,434	Recap
3	September 27	at **Detroit Lions**	**W** 14–0	2–1	Briggs Stadium	14,646	Recap
4	October 4	**Chicago Bears**	**L** 7–21	2–2	League Park	17,167	Recap
5	October 11	at Washington Redskins	**L** 14–33	2–3	Griffith Stadium	33,250	Recap
6	October 18	at **Green Bay Packers**	**L** 28–45	2–4	City Stadium	12,847	Recap
7	October 25	**Chicago Cardinals**	**W** 7–3	3–4	League Park	7,896	Recap
8	November 1	at Brooklyn Dodgers	**W** 17–0	4–4	Ebbets Field	6,329	Recap
9	November 8	**Green Bay Packers**	**L** 12–30	4–5	League Park	16,473	Recap
10	November 15	**Detroit Lions**	**W** 27–7	5–5	League Park	4,029	Recap
11	November 22	Wichita Aero Commandos*	**W** 14–7	-	Lawrence Stadium	??	Recap
12	November 29	at **Chicago Bears**	**L** 0–47	5–6	Wrigley Field	13,195	Recap
13	Bye						
Note: Intra-division opponents are in **bold** text.

Source: Pro Football Reference

^{*} Non-league game.

== Roster ==
1942 Cleveland Rams final roster
Backs: 3 Corby Davis FB/LB; 55 Dutch Elston RB/S; 32 Parker Hall RB/CB/P; 37 Len Janiak FB/LB; 42 Bill Lazetich RB/CB; 69 Dante Magnani RB/CB; 49 George Morris RB/S; 50 John Petchel RB/S; 58 Warren Plunkett RB/S; 44 Gaylon Smith FB/LB	Linemen/Linebackers: 34 Chet Adams T/DT/K; 59 Larry Brahm G/DG; 72 Boyd Clay T/DT/K; 47 Red Conkright C/LB; 57 Jake Fawcett T/DT; 11 Riley Matheson G/DG; 52 Barney McGarry G/DG; 65 Joe Pasqua T/DT; 60 Hank Rockwell G/DG; 54 Bill Rieth C/G/DG; 45 Roy Stuart G/DG; 48 Wilfred Thorpe G/DG	Ends/Receivers: 30 Jim Benton; 63 Joe Gibson; 53 Ben Hightower; 70 George Platukis; 12 Johnny Wilson; Reserve: 56 Jack Boone RB/CB; -- Jim Gillette RB/CB (Military); 43 Jack Jacobs RB/CB/P; -- Bob Keene RB/S; rookies in italics

== Standings ==
NFL Western Division
	W	L	T	PCT	DIV	PF	PA	STK
Chicago Bears	11	0	0	1.000	8–0	376	84	W11
Green Bay Packers	8	2	1	.800	6–2	300	215	W2
Cleveland Rams	5	6	0	.455	3–5	150	207	L1
Chicago Cardinals	3	8	0	.273	3–5	98	209	L6
Detroit Lions	0	11	0	.000	0–8	38	263	L11

Note: Tie games were not officially counted in the standings until 1972.

NFL Eastern Division
	W	L	T	PCT	DIV	PF	PA	STK
Washington Redskins	10	1	0	.909	7–1	227	102	W9
Pittsburgh Steelers	7	4	0	.636	5–3	167	119	L1
New York Giants	5	5	1	.500	4–4	155	139	W2
Brooklyn Dodgers	3	8	0	.273	2–6	100	168	L6
Philadelphia Eagles	2	9	0	.182	2–6	134	239	L1

Note: Tie games were not officially counted in the standings until 1972.
