= Herman Hodges =

American football player (1914–)

- Hodges, circa 1937

No. 13, 17
- Position: End

Personal information
- Born: November 22, 1914; Geneva, Alabama, U.S.
- Died: April 6, 2000 (aged 85)
- Listed height: 6 ft 1 in (1.85 m)
- Listed weight: 198 lb (90 kg)

Career information
- High school: Geneva County
- College: Howard
- NFL draft: 1939: undrafted

Career history
- Brooklyn Dodgers (1939–1942); San Diego Bombers (1943)
- Stats at Pro Football Reference

Jesse Herman Hodges (November 22, 1914 – April 6, 2000) was an American professional football end who played for the Brooklyn Dodgers of the National Football League (NFL). He played college football for the Howard Bulldogs.

== Early life ==
Jesse Herman Hodges was born on November 22, 1914, in Geneva, Alabama. He attended Geneva County High School.

== College career ==
Hodges enrolled at Howard College to play college football for the Bulldogs. He was on the freshmen team in 1935 and the varsity team from 1936 to 1938. He was an alternate captain of the 1937 Bulldogs and earned second-team All-Dixie Conference honors that year. Hodges was team captain of the 1938 Bulldogs and garnered second-team All-Dixie Conference recognition again.

== Professional career ==
Hodges went undrafted in the 1939 NFL draft. He played in 40 games, starting eight, for the Brooklyn Dodgers of the National Football League (NFL) from 1939 to 1942, catching 23 passes for 285 yards on offense and scoring one interception return touchdown on defense.

Hodges played for the San Diego Bombers of the Pacific Coast Professional Football League in 1943 and scored one interception return touchdown.

== Personal life ==
Hodges served in the United States Marine Corps. He died on April 6, 2000.
