= Larry Brahm =

American football player (1916–1959)

Profile
- Position: Guard

Personal information
- Born: August 12, 1916; Bayonne, New Jersey
- Died: June 16, 1959 (aged 42); Yonkers, New York
- Listed height: 5 ft 10 in (1.78 m)
- Listed weight: 204 lb (93 kg)

Career information
- High school: Blair Academy (NJ)
- College: Temple

Career history
- Cleveland Rams (1942)
- Stats at Pro Football Reference

Larry Brahm (August 12, 1916 – June 16, 1959) was an American football guard. He played for the Cleveland Rams in 1942.
