= John Woudenberg =

American football player (1918–2005)

- Woudenberg in 1949

No. 36, 41
- Position: Offensive tackle

Personal information
- Born: May 25, 1918; Denver, Colorado, U.S.
- Died: May 3, 2005 (aged 86); Arizona, U.S.
- Listed height: 6 ft 3 in (1.91 m)
- Listed weight: 226 lb (103 kg)

Career information
- High school: South (Denver)
- College: Denver (1936-1939)
- NFL draft: 1940: 6th round, 47th overall pick

Career history
- Pittsburgh Steelers (1940–1942); San Francisco 49ers (1946-1949)

Awards and highlights
- Pro Bowl (1942); University of Denver Athletics Hall of Fame (1996)

Career NFL/AAFC statistics
- Games played: 83
- Games started: 71
- Stats at Pro Football Reference

John William "Dutch" Woudenberg Jr. (May 25, 1918 – May 3, 2005) was an American professional athlete and politician. Woudenberg was a professional football player who was a tackle in the National Football League (NFL) and the All-America Football Conference (AAFC). He played college football for the Denver Pioneers.

== Biography ==
John Woudenberg was born May 25, 1918, in Denver. He attended South High School in that city.

Woudenberg played college football and wrestled at the University of Denver. He was affiliated with the Kappa Sigma fraternity at DU.

Woudenberg with the Steelers during his rookie year, 1940.

Woudenberg was selected by the Chicago Bears in the sixth round of the 1940 NFL draft. He played for the Pittsburgh Steelers in 1940 through 1942. During World War II he served as an officer in the United States Navy. After the war he joined the AAFC's San Francisco 49ers in 1946 and played until 1949.

Woudenberg was married in August 1943.

He later moved to Arizona and served as mayor of Scottsdale, Arizona for six months in 1964.
