= Al Blozis =

American football player (1919–1945)

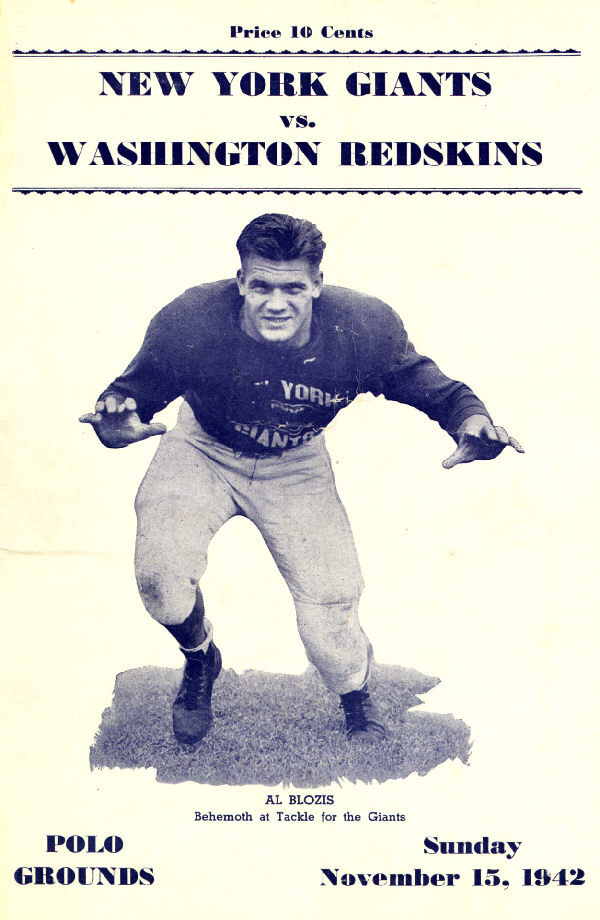

No. 32
- Position: Offensive tackle

Personal information
- Born: January 5, 1919; Garfield, New Jersey, U.S.
- Died: January 31, 1945 (aged 26); Vosges Mountains, France †
- Listed height: 6 ft 6 in (1.98 m)
- Listed weight: 250 lb (113 kg)

Career information
- High school: William L. Dickinson (Jersey City, New Jersey)
- College: Georgetown (1939–1941)
- NFL draft: 1942: 5th round, 38th overall pick

Career history
- New York Giants (1942–1944)

Awards and highlights
- First-team All-Pro (1943); NFL All-Star (1942); NFL 1940s All-Decade Team; New York Giants Ring of Honor; New York Giants No. 32 retired; First-team All-Eastern (1941)
- Military career
- Allegiance: United States
- Branch: U.S. Army
- Service years: 1943–1945
- Rank: Second lieutenant
- Unit: 28th Infantry Division
- Conflicts: World War II: Western Front; Western Allied invasion of France †
- College Football Hall of Fame

Alfred Charles Blozis (January 5, 1919 – January 31, 1945) was an American professional football player and track and field athlete who died fighting in World War II. He played offensive tackle for the New York Giants in the National Football League (NFL)

== Biography ==
=== Early life ===
Alfred Charles Blozis, known as "Al", was born on January 5, 1919, in Garfield, New Jersey to Lithuanian immigrants. He attended William L. Dickinson High School in Jersey City, New Jersey, where he became well known for his skill in the discus throw and shot put. At Georgetown University, he won AAU and NCAA indoor and outdoor shot titles three years in a row from 1940 to 1942. He had a best put of 57 feet 3/4 inch (17.39 meters). In 2015, Blozis was inducted into the National Track and Field Hall of Fame.

=== Professional football career ===
Blozis was drafted in the fifth round of the 1942 NFL draft and played offensive tackle for the New York Giants of the National Football League in 1942 and 1943 before entering the military. He was also able to play three games in 1944 while on furlough.

=== World War II and death ===
In a 1991 news story, The New York Times wrote, "Curiously, the very size that made him so intimidating on the football field kept him out of the military until late 1943, when, after repeated attempts, Blozis finally persuaded the Army to waive its size limit and accept him. It took further persuading to get from a desk job to the front lines."

Blozis was inducted into the United States Army on December 9, 1943. He was first assigned to duty as a physical instructor at Walter Reed General Hospital and then went through officer training at Fort Benning, where he set the army's hand-grenade-throwing record with a toss of 94 yards, 2 feet, 6.5 inches. He was commissioned as a second lieutenant in the 28th Infantry Division. On January 31, 1945, his platoon was in the Vosges Mountains of France scouting enemy lines. When two of his men, a sergeant and a private, failed to return from a patrol, he went in search of them alone. He never returned.

Blozis was first listed as missing, but in April 1945, his death was confirmed.

=== Honors ===
The New York Giants retired the number 32 that Blozis had worn. A second Giants player, Jack Lummus, also died in World War II.

In April 1946, True Comics featured a story about Blozis entitled The Human Howitzer.

The United States Army honored Blozis by naming an athletic center in Frankfurt, Germany after him. He was inducted into the College Football Hall of Fame in 1986.

An apartment building in Jersey City, Al Blozis Hall, is named in his honor.

== See also ==
- Bob Kalsu – professional football player who enlisted in the US Army and was killed in action in Vietnam
- Pat Tillman – professional football player who enlisted in the US Army and was killed in action in Afghanistan
