= 1942 New York Giants season =

NFL team 18th season

- Head coach: Steve Owen
- Home stadium: Polo Grounds

Results
- Record: 5–5–1
- Division place: 3rd NFL Eastern
- Playoffs: Did not qualify

The 1942 New York Giants season was the franchise's 18th season in the National Football League.

== Schedule ==
Game	Date	Opponent	Result	Record	Venue	Attendance	Recap	Sources
1	September 27	at **Washington Redskins**	**W** 14–7	1–0	Griffith Stadium	34,700	Recap	
2	October 4	at **Pittsburgh Steelers**	**L** 10–13	1–1	Forbes Field	9,600	Recap	
3	October 11	**Philadelphia Eagles**	**W** 35–17	2–1	Polo Grounds	28,264	Recap	
4	October 18	at Chicago Bears	**L** 7–26	2–2	Wrigley Field	32,000	Recap	
5	October 25	at **Brooklyn Dodgers**	**L** 7–17	2–3	Ebbets Field	23,234	Recap	
6	November 1	**Pittsburgh Steelers**	**L** 9–17	2–4	Polo Grounds	19,346	Recap	
7	November 8	at **Philadelphia Eagles**	**W** 14–0	3–4	Shibe Park	13,548	Recap	
8	November 15	**Washington Redskins**	**L** 7–14	3–5	Polo Grounds	30,879	Recap	
9	November 22	Green Bay Packers	**T** 21–21	3–5–1	Polo Grounds	30,246	Recap	
10	November 29	Chicago Cardinals	**W** 21–7	4–5–1	Polo Grounds	20,354	Recap	
11	December 6	**Brooklyn Dodgers**	**W** 10–0	5–5–1	Polo Grounds	27,449	Recap	
Note: Intra-conference opponents are in **bold** text.

== Roster ==
1942 New York Giants final roster
Backs: 12 Leo Cantor FB/LB/P; 14 Ward Cuff RB/CB/K; 44 Merle Hapes RB/CB/P; 4 Tuffy Leemans FB/LB; 28 Don Lieberum RB/CB; 70 Andy Marefos FB/LB; 8 Al Owen RB/CB; 25 Dom Principe RB/S; 20 Leland Shaffer RB/S; 15 Hank Soar RB/CB/K; 17 Bob Trocolor RB/CB/P	Linemen/Linebackers: 55 Chuck Avedisian G/DG; 11 Emmett Barrett C/LB; 50 Kay Bell T/DT; 32 Al Blozis T/DT; 52 Harry Buffington G/DG; 36 Frank Cope T/DT; 60 Monk Edwards G/DG; 49 Harold Hall C/LB; 7 Mel Hein C/LB; 29 Ed Hiemstra G/DG; 33 Red Seick G/DG; 69 Paul Stenn T/DT	Ends/Receivers: 30 O'Neal Adams; 21 Jim Lee Howell; 34 Johnny Lascari; 22 Frank Liebel; 24 Will Walls; Reserve: 39 John Chickerneo RB/S/P; 42 Bill Hutcinson FB/LB; 66 Jiggs Kline E; -- Win Pedersen T/DT (Military); rookies in italics

== Standings ==
Program for the November 29 game against the Chicago Cardinals. Featured on the cover is kicker Ward Cuff.

NFL Eastern Division
	W	L	T	PCT	DIV	PF	PA	STK
Washington Redskins	10	1	0	.909	7–1	227	102	W9
Pittsburgh Steelers	7	4	0	.636	5–3	167	119	L1
New York Giants	5	5	1	.500	4–4	155	139	W2
Brooklyn Dodgers	3	8	0	.273	2–6	100	168	L6
Philadelphia Eagles	2	9	0	.182	2–6	134	239	L1

Note: Tie games were not officially counted in the standings until 1972.

== See also ==
- List of New York Giants seasons
