= Jack Smith (end) =

American football player (1917–2015)

No. 83, 53
- Position: End

Personal information
- Born: August 11, 1917; Los Angeles, California, U.S.
- Died: June 6, 2015 (aged 97)
- Listed height: 6 ft 1 in (1.85 m)
- Listed weight: 200 lb (91 kg)

Career information
- College: Stanford

Career history
- Philadelphia Eagles (1942); Washington Redskins (1943)
- Stats at Pro Football Reference

John Bullas Smith (August 11, 1917 – June 6, 2015) was an American football end in the National Football League (NFL) for the Philadelphia Eagles and the Washington Redskins. He served in World War II and attended Stanford University. He died in June 2015 at the age of 97.
