= Vic Carroll =

American football player (1912–1986)

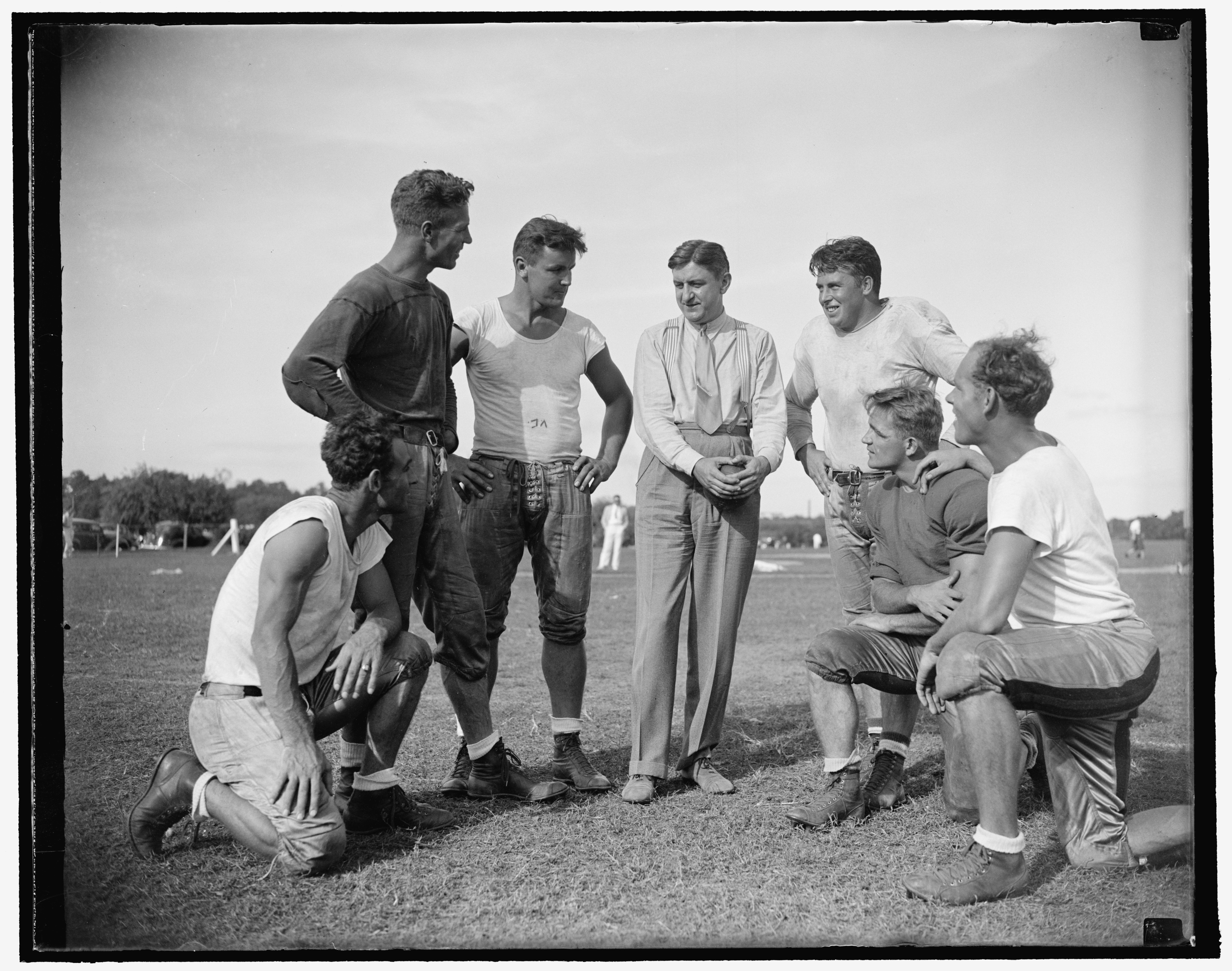

No. 26
- Position: Offensive lineman

Personal information
- Born: November 19, 1912; Alhambra, California, U.S.
- Died: July 6, 1986 (aged 73); Mission Viejo, California, U.S.
- Listed height: 6 ft 3 in (1.91 m)
- Listed weight: 235 lb (107 kg)

Career information
- High school: Alhambra (CA)
- College: Nevada–Reno

Career history
- Boston/Washington Redskins (1936–1942); New York Giants (1943–1947)

Awards and highlights
- 2× NFL champion (1937, 1942); Pro Bowl (1942)
- Stats at Pro Football Reference

Victor Eugene Carroll (November 19, 1912 – July 6, 1986) was an American football offensive lineman in the National Football League (NFL) for the Boston/Washington Redskins and the New York Giants. He played college football at the University of Nevada-Reno.
