= Bill Young (American football lineman) =

American football player and coach (1914–1994)

- Young in 1940

No. 37
- Position: Tackle

Personal information
- Born: May 20, 1914; North Little Rock, Arkansas, U.S.
- Died: January 21, 1994 (aged 79); Jacksonville, Florida, U.S.
- Listed height: 6 ft 1 in (1.85 m)
- Listed weight: 247 lb (112 kg)

Career information
- High school: North Little Rock
- College: Alabama
- NFL draft: 1937: undrafted

Career history

Playing
- Washington Redskins (1937–1942, 1946)

Coaching
- Furman (1948–1949) (line); Furman (1950–1954) (head coach)

Awards and highlights
- 2× NFL champion (1937, 1942); Pro Bowl (1942)

Career NFL statistics
- Games played: 59
- Starts: 11
- Touchdowns: 1
- Stats at Pro Football Reference

William A. Young Jr (May 20, 1914 – January 21, 1994) was an American professional football player and coach. He played a lineman in the National Football League (NFL) for the Washington Redskins. Young served as the head football coach of Furman University from 1950 to 1954.

== Early life ==
Young was born in North Little Rock, Arkansas and attended North Little Rock High School.

== College career ==
Young attended and played college football at the University of Alabama. As a sophomore in 1934, he helped the Crimson Tide finish the season with a perfect record (10–0 overall, 7–0 in the SEC), as Southeastern Conference champions for the second consecutive season and as national champions after they defeated Stanford in the Rose Bowl. Alabama was selected national champion in 1934 by Dunkel, Houlgate, Poling System and Williamson. Sportswriter Morgan Blake called it the best football team he ever saw.

== Professional career ==
=== Player ===
After going undrafted in 1937, Young was signed by the Washington Redskins. During his rookie season, the Redskins won their first league championship, the 1937 NFL Championship Game, on December 12, 1937, against the Chicago Bears, their first year in D.C. The Redskins then met the Bears again in the 1940 NFL Championship Game on December 8, 1940. The result, 73–0 in favor of the Bears, is still the worst one-sided loss in NFL history. Young then played in his third championship game, the 1942 NFL Championship on December 13, 1942, where the Redskins won their second championship, 14–6.

Young left the team on January 8, 1943, and enlisted in the United States Navy as a chief specialist during World War II.

=== Coach ===
Young was the head coach for the Furman University football team from 1950 to 1954.

== Personal ==
Young died on January 21, 1994, in Jacksonville, Florida.

== Head coaching record ==
Year	Team	Overall	Conference	Standing	Bowl/playoffs
Furman Purple Hurricane (Southern Conference) (1950–1954)
1950	Furman	2–8–1	2–4	13th	
1951	Furman	3–6–1	1–4–1	15th	
1952	Furman	6–3–1	2–2–1	T–6th	
1953	Furman	7–2	2–0	2nd	
1954	Furman	5–5	2–0	2nd	
Furman:		23–24–3	9–10–2		
Total:		23–24–3			
