= Bobby Robertson =

American football player (1917–2009)

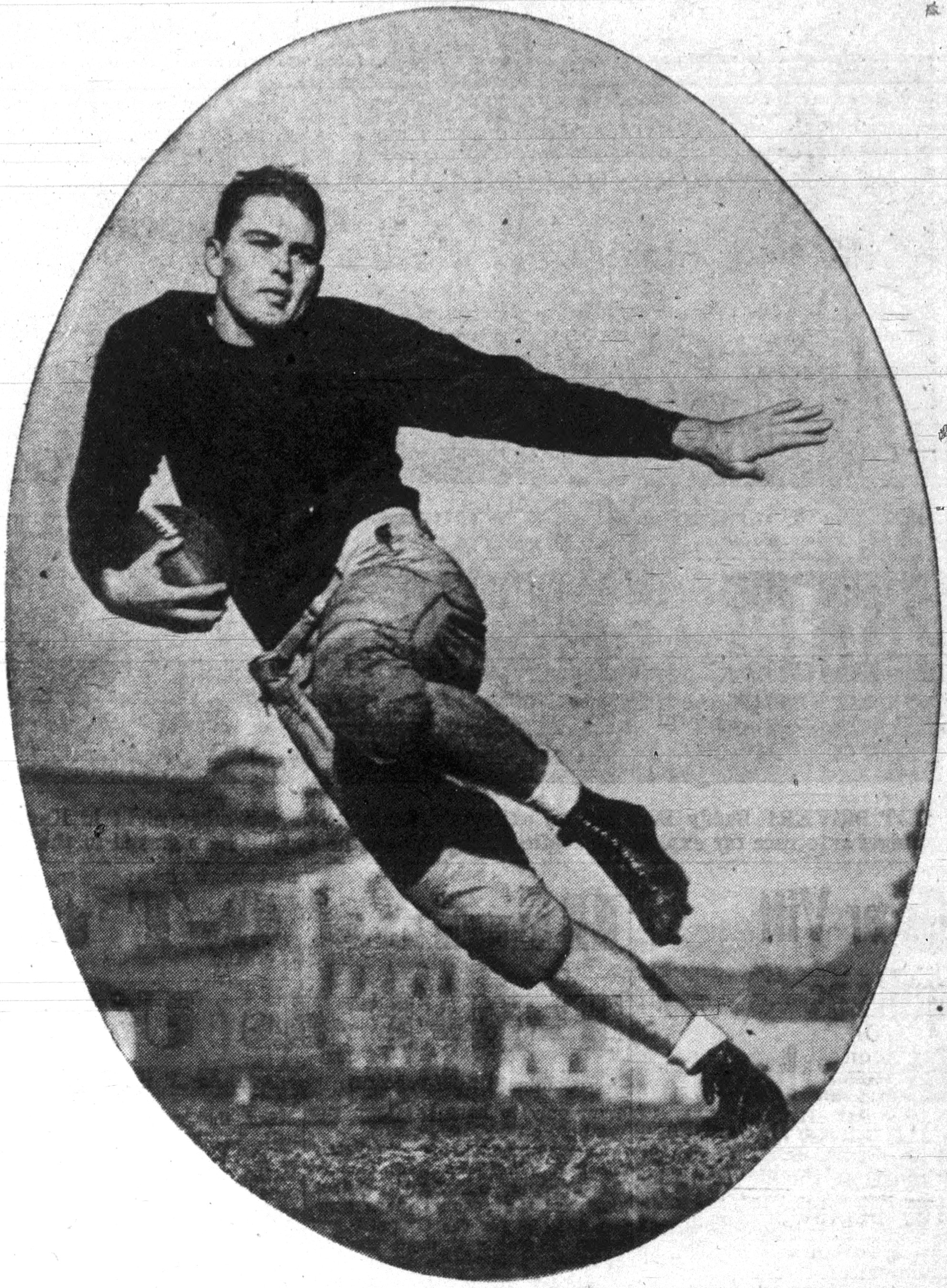
- Robertson, circa 1941

No. 4
- Position: Halfback

Personal information
- Born: June 18, 1917; Pine Ridge, South Dakota, U.S.
- Died: January 17, 2009 (aged 91); Santa Cruz, California, U.S.
- Listed height: 5 ft 11 in (1.80 m)
- Listed weight: 185 lb (84 kg)

Career information
- High school: Omaha Central (Omaha, Nebraska)
- College: USC (1938–1941)
- NFL draft: 1942: 1st round, 7th overall pick

Career history
- Brooklyn Dodgers (1942); Los Angeles Bulldogs (1945)

Awards and highlights
- National champion (1939); First-team All-PCC (1941); Second-team All-PCC (1940)

Career NFL statistics
- Rushing yards: 132
- Rushing average: 2.9
- Receptions: 5
- Receiving yards: 61
- Stats at Pro Football Reference

Robert James Robertson (June 18, 1917 – January 17, 2009) was an American professional football player who played one season with the Brooklyn Dodgers of the National Football League (NFL). He was selected by the Dodgers with the seventh overall pick of the 1942 NFL draft after playing college football at the University of Southern California.

== Early life ==
Robert James Robertson was born on June 18, 1917, in Pine Ridge, South Dakota. He attended Omaha Central High School in Omaha, Nebraska and Black-Foxe Military Institute in Los Angeles, California.

== College career ==
He was a member of the USC Trojans of the University of Southern California from 1938 to 1941 and a three-year letterman from 1939 to 1941. He was a member of the Trojans 1939 national championship team. He led the team in total offensive yards, rushing yards, and scoring his junior year in 1940, earning Associated Press (AP) third-team and United Press (UP) second-team All-PCC honors. He led the team in total offensive yards, rushing yards, passing yards, and scoring as a senior in 1941, garnering AP and UP first-team All-PCC recognition. Robertson also set a school single-season record with nine interceptions in 1941 and recorded 14 interceptions total during his college career. He played in the Chicago Charities College All-Star Game and the East-West Shrine Game after his senior year.

== Professional career ==
Robertson was selected by the Brooklyn Dodgers in the first round, with the seventh overall pick, of the 1942 NFL draft. He played in all 11 games, starting one, for the Dodgers during the 1942 season, totaling 46 carries for 132 yards, five catches for 61 yards, and two defensive interceptions. He became a free agent after the season. Robertson's football career was interrupted by a stint in the United States Navy during World War II.

Robertson played for the Los Angeles Bulldogs of the Pacific Coast Professional Football League in 1945 and scored two rushing touchdowns.

== Personal life ==
Robertson worked as an insurance executive after his football career. He died on January 17, 2009, in Santa Cruz, California of "natural causes".
