= Clure Mosher =

American football player (1920–1966)

No. 37
- Position: Center / linebacker

Personal information
- Born: January 11, 1920; Fort Worth, Texas, U.S.
- Died: July 23, 1966 (aged 46); New York City, New York, U.S.
- Listed height: 6 ft 1 in (1.85 m)
- Listed weight: 215 lb (98 kg)

Career information
- High school: Kentucky Military Institute (Lyndon, Kentucky)
- College: Louisville (1938–1941)
- NFL draft: 1942: 14th round, 121st overall pick

Career history
- Pittsburgh Steelers (1942)

Clure Harrison Mosher (January 11, 1920 – July 23, 1966) was an American professional football player and sportscaster. He played college football for the Louisville Cardinals and later one season in the National Football League (NFL) for the Pittsburgh Steelers. After his football career, he was known as "one of the country's most outspoken sportscasters".
