= Lee Artoe =

American football player (1917–2005)

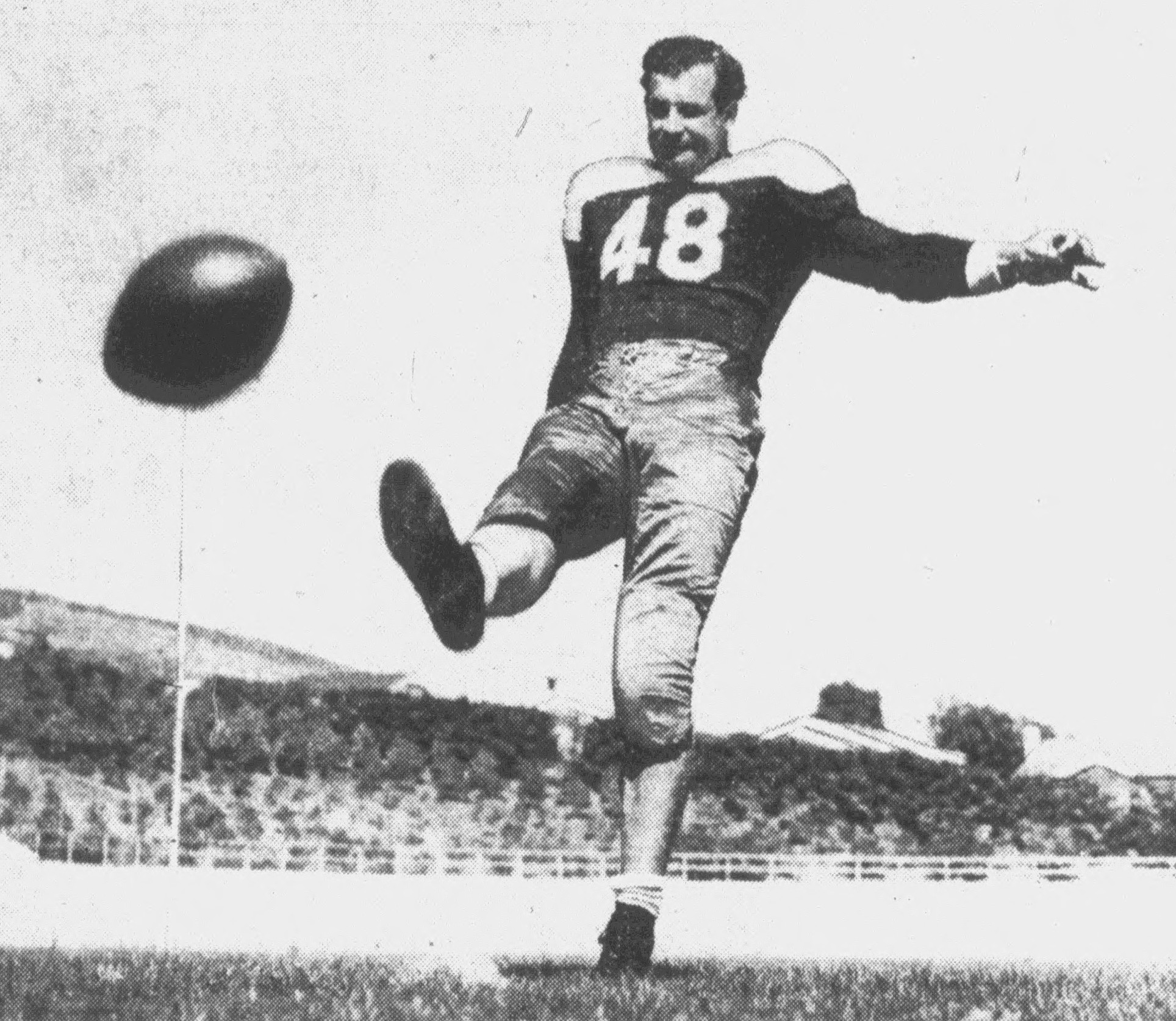
- Artoe, circa 1946

No. 35, 1, 44, 48
- Positions: Tackle, placekicker

Personal information
- Born: March 2, 1917; Tacoma, Washington, U.S.
- Died: April 1, 2005 (aged 88); Wilmette, Illinois, U.S.
- Listed height: 6 ft 3 in (1.91 m)
- Listed weight: 234 lb (106 kg)

Career information
- High school: Lincoln (WA)
- College: Santa Clara; California
- NFL draft: 1940: 11th round, 97th overall pick

Career history
- Chicago Bears (1940–1942, 1945); Los Angeles Dons (1946-1947); Baltimore Colts (1948)

Awards and highlights
- 2× NFL champion (1940, 1941); First-team All-Pro (1942); Second-team All-Pro (1941); 3× Pro Bowl (1940–1942); Second-team All-American (1939); First-team All-PCC (1939)

Career NFL statistics
- Games played: 84
- Games started: 62
- Stats at Pro Football Reference

Lee Robert Reno Artoe (March 2, 1917 – April 1, 2005) was an American professional football player for seven seasons in the National Football League (NFL) and All-America Football Conference (AAFC). A tackle, Artoe played for the NFL's Chicago Bears (1940–1942, 1945). In the AAFC, he played for the Los Angeles Dons (1946–1947) and Baltimore Colts (1948).

Artoe played college football at University of Santa Clara, with the Santa Clara Broncos, and in 1940 was picked in the 11th round by Chicago. He returned a fumble in the 1942 NFL Championship Game 52 yards for the first score of the game.

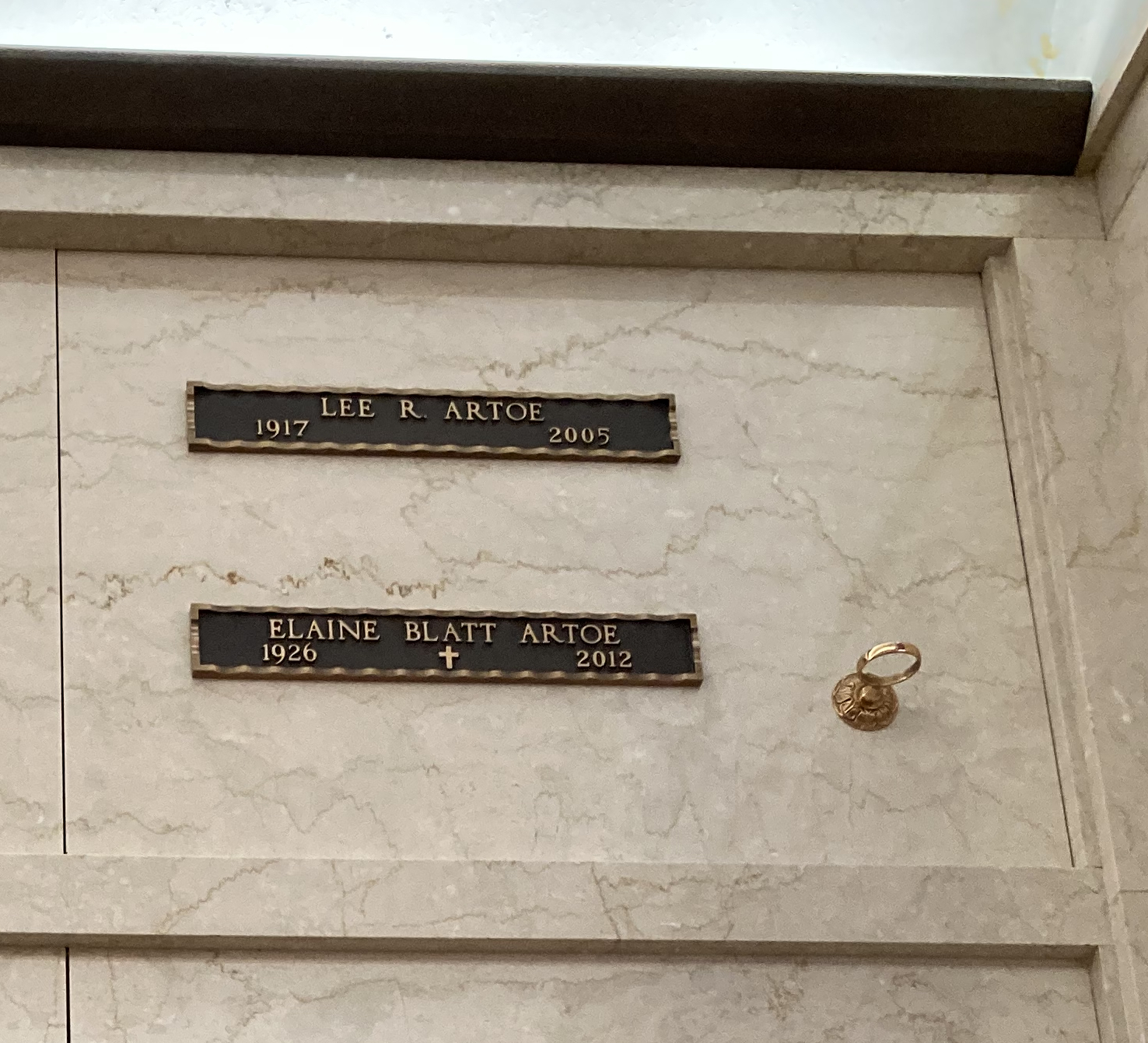
Artoe's grave at Memorial Park Cemetery

Artoe served in the U.S. Navy as a member of the Underwater Demolition Team.

He died in Wilmette, Illinois on April 1, 2005, and was buried at Memorial Park Cemetery in Skokie.
