= Eddie Rucinski =

American football player (1916–1995)

No. 26, 51, 75, 19
- Position: End

Personal information
- Born: July 12, 1916; East Chicago, Indiana, U.S.
- Died: April 22, 1995 (aged 78); Pinellas County, Florida, U.S.
- Listed height: 6 ft 2 in (1.88 m)
- Listed weight: 198 lb (90 kg)

Career information
- College: Indiana (1937-1940)
- NFL draft: 1941: 6th round, 49th overall pick

Career history
- Brooklyn Dodgers (1941–1942); Chicago Cardinals (1943); "Card-Pitt" (1944); Chicago Cardinals (1945–1946)

Awards and highlights
- First-team All-Pro (1943); Pro Bowl (1942)

Career NFL statistics
- Rushing yards: 85
- Rushing average: 4.7
- Receptions: 99
- Receiving yards: 1,408
- Total touchdowns: 8
- Stats at Pro Football Reference

Edward Anthony Rucinski (July 12, 1916 – April 22, 1995) was an American professional football player who played end for six seasons for the Brooklyn Dodgers, Chicago Cardinals and "Card-Pitt" of the National Football League. Rucinski was named to the 1939 College Football All Polish-American Team. He played college football at Indiana University where he was a member of Sigma Pi fraternity. He died in Florida on April 22, 1995. He was drafted in the six round of the 1941 NFL Draft by the Brooklyn Dodgers.

== Career ==
Rucinski played in sixty NFL games, starting in forty-one of them. He scored eight career touchdowns (all as a receiver) and averaged 14.2 receiving yards per game. In his career he had ninety-nine receptions for 1408 yards. He also had eighteen career rushes for eighty-five yards. He was selected to the Pro Bowl in 1942 and named All-Pro in 1943.

== NFL career statistics ==
Legend
**Bold**	Career high

Year	Team	Games		Receiving				
Year	Team	GP	GS	Rec	Yds	Avg	Lng	TD
1941	BKN	11	8	17	204	12.0	33	1
1942	BKN	11	9	9	99	11.0	24	1
1943	CRD	10	9	**26**	398	15.3	47	**3**
1944	CRD	10	6	22	284	12.9	40	1
1945	CRD	8	7	23	**400**	**17.4**	**62**	2
1946	CRD	10	2	2	23	11.5	12	0
Career		60	41	99	1,408	14.2	62	8

== Personal life ==
Rucinski was married to Mae Tilly. He had a daughter named Suzie and a stepson named John. After leaving football he moved to California. In the 1970s he moved to Indian Rocks Beach, Florida, where he was a member of St. Jerome's Catholic Church, and opened a medical supply business in St. Petersburg, Florida.
