= Emmett Barrett =

American football player (1916–2005)

- Barrett with the Portland Pilots, c. 1940

No. 12, 11
- Position: Center

Personal information
- Born: November 7, 1916; Sioux City, Iowa, U.S.
- Died: May 2, 2005 (aged 88); Portland, Oregon, U.S.
- Listed height: 6 ft 2 in (1.88 m)
- Listed weight: 192 lb (87 kg)

Career information
- High school: Trinity (Sioux City, Iowa)
- College: Portland (1937–1940)
- NFL draft: 1941: undrafted

Career history
- New York Giants (1941–1942); → Paterson Panthers (1941); New York Giants (1944)
- Stats at Pro Football Reference

Emmett Edward Barrett (November 7, 1916 – May 2, 2005) was an American professional football center who played one season with the New York Giants of the National Football League (NFL). He played college football at the University of Portland. He wore glasses while playing football.

== Early life and college ==
Emmett Edward Barrett was born on November 7, 1916, in Sioux City, Iowa. He attended Trinity High School in Sioux City. After high school, his goal was to play college football for the Portland Pilots of the University of Portland. To save money, he hitchhiked from Sioux City to Portland, Oregon with only $7.

Barrett then played for the Portland Pilots as a center and linebacker from 1937 to 1940. He was on the freshman team in 1937 and the main roster from 1938 to 1940. Barrett was the yearbook art editor and senior class vice president while at Portland as well. He was inducted into the school's athletics hall of fame in 1994.

== Professional career ==
Barrett signed with the New York Giants after going undrafted in the 1941 NFL draft. Barrett did not play for the Giants in 1941 and instead played for their farm team, the Paterson Panthers of the American Association. He appeared in all ten games, starting three, for the Panthers during the 1941 season. The Panthers finished the year with a 6–2–2 record and lost to the Wilmington Clippers in the playoffs by a score of 33–0. He wore jersey number 12 with the Panthers. Barrett was called back up to the Giants in 1942 and played in ten games for them that year. He wore number 11 while with the Giants. He then served in the United States Army during World War II. When he was inducted into the Army in January 1943, it was revealed that his real weight was 168 pounds instead of 193 pounds as listed by the Giants. Hollis Goodrich of The Oregonian claimed that this made Barrett the smallest lineman in the NFL. Barrett was medically discharged from the Army in 1944. Barrett re-signed with the Giants on August 2, 1944, but did not play in any games for them during the 1944 season. When the Giants advanced to the 1944 NFL Championship Game, the team voted to split up their playoff jackpot 40 ways, with 30 players and coaches receiving full shares and ten other Giants personnel receiving half shares. Barrett received a half share.

== Personal life ==
Barrett's brother Gene also played football for the Portland Pilots. Emmett worked in the insurance industry after his football career and also became president of Oregon Polytechnic Institute. He died on May 2, 2005, in Portland, Oregon.

== Glasses ==
Barrett wore glasses while playing football. In 1940, The Oregonian stated that they were a special type of unshatterable glasses and that he did not wear a caged helmet. However, in 1942, he wore a helmet with a face mask while playing for the Giants. In 1943, he was featured in a drawing by cartoonist Thomas P. Paprocki that showed various athletes who wore glasses. In January 1982, Barrett claimed that he was the first NFL player to wear glasses.
