= Dick Riffle =

American football player (1915–1981)

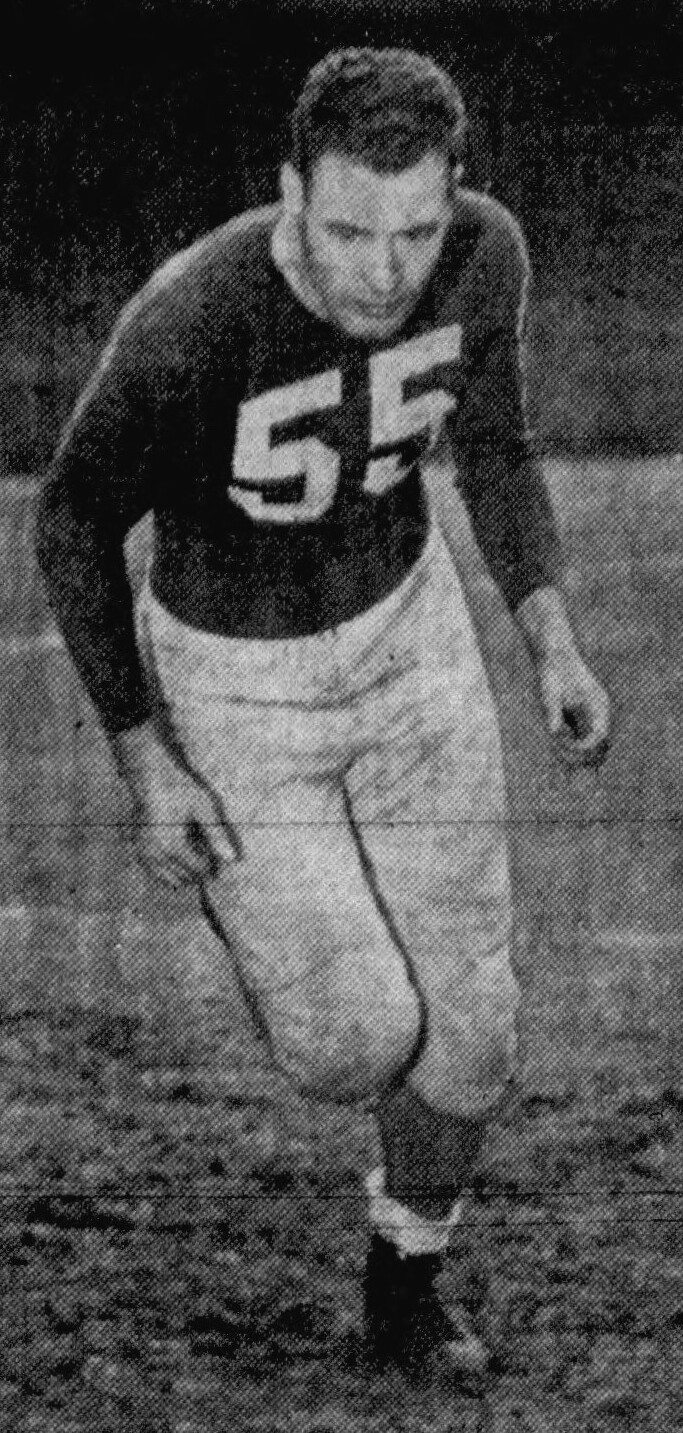
- Riffle, circa 1941

No. 45, 12
- Position: Back

Personal information
- Born: February 2, 1915; Wellsboro, Pennsylvania, U.S.
- Died: April 29, 1981 (aged 66); Corning, New York, U.S.
- Listed height: 6 ft 1 in (1.85 m)
- Listed weight: 200 lb (91 kg)

Career information
- High school: Northside (Corning, New York)
- College: Albright
- NFL draft: 1938: 2nd round, 12th overall pick

Career history
- Philadelphia Eagles (1938–1940); Pittsburgh Steelers (1941–1942)

Awards and highlights
- Pro Bowl (1941); 2× First-team Little All-American (1936, 1937); Second-team All-Eastern (1937)

Career NFL statistics
- Rushing yards: 1,381
- Rushing touchdowns: 10
- Receptions: 19
- Receiving yards: 189
- Receiving touchdowns: 2
- Passing yards: 332
- Passing touchdowns: 3
- Stats at Pro Football Reference

Fred Richard Riffle (February 2, 1915 – April 29, 1981) was an American professional football player who played as a back for five seasons for the Philadelphia Eagles and Pittsburgh Steelers of the National Football League (NFL). He played college football at Albright College.

== Professional career ==
Riffle was selected in the second round of the 1938 NFL draft. Riffle played for the Philadelphia Eagles for three seasons, from 1938–1940. In his rookie season, Riffle appeared in eleven games, starting four, and finished the season with 227 yards on 65 rushing attempts and one touchdown, which he scored against the Pittsburgh Steelers (then known as the Pittsburgh Pirates) in Philadelphia's 27–7 week two win. Riffle would not see the end zone at all in 1939. In that season, Riffle only carried the ball 18 times for 61 yards, as Joe Bukant had the bulk of the teams carries. In 1940, Riffle scored the only touchdown in a 7–0 win over Pittsburgh in week 13. The Eagles continued to be one the league's worse teams, next to the Steelers. Following a series of ownership transactions known as the "Pennsylvania Polka, Riffle found himself playing for the Eagles inter-state rival. Against the Washington Redskins in 1941, Riffle caught a touchdown pass from quarterback Al Donelli to tie the game at 7. Washington would go on to win 24–20. Even as the Steelers went through three coaches en route to a 1–9 season, Riffle was selected to his first and only pro bowl. Playing in just ten games, Riffle rushed for 388 yards on 109 carries with one touchdown. In 1942, Riffle started 11 games for Pittsburgh, rushing for 467 yards on 115 carries for four touchdowns. The Steelers went 7–4, a winning record under head coach Walt Kiesling. This, however, would be Riffle's last season of pro football.

== NFL career statistics ==
Legend
| **Bold** | Career high |

| Year | Team | Games | | Rushing | | | | Receiving | | | |
| Year | Team | GP | GS | Att | Yds | Avg | TD | Rec | Yds | Avg | TD |
|---|---|---|---|---|---|---|---|---|---|---|---|
| 1938 | PHI | 11 | 4 | 65 | 227 | 3.5 | 1 | 0 | 0 | 0.0 | 0 |
| 1939 | PHI | 10 | 3 | 18 | 61 | 3.4 | 0 | 6 | 57 | 9.5 | 0 |
| 1940 | PHI | 11 | 6 | 81 | 238 | 2.9 | **4** | **8** | **58** | 7.3 | **1** |
| 1941 | PIT | 10 | 7 | 109 | 388 | 3.6 | 1 | 2 | 24 | 12.0 | **1** |
| 1942 | PIT | 11 | 11 | **115** | **467** | **4.1** | **4** | 3 | 50 | **16.7** | 0 |
| | | 53 | 31 | 388 | 1,381 | 3.6 | 10 | 19 | 189 | 9.9 | 2 |

== Death ==
Riffle died on April 29, 1981, in Corning, NY. He was 66 years old.
