= Dick Todd (American football) =

American football player and coach (1914–1999)

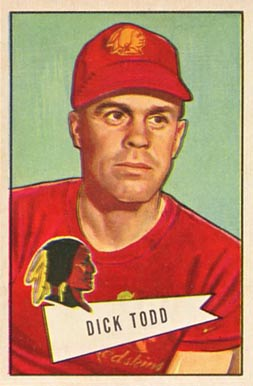
- Todd on a 1952 Bowman football card

No. 41
- Positions: Fullback, defensive back, punt returner

Personal information
- Born: October 2, 1914; Thrall, Texas, U.S.
- Died: November 9, 1999 (aged 85); Crowell, Texas, U.S.
- Listed height: 5 ft 11 in (1.80 m)
- Listed weight: 172 lb (78 kg)

Career information
- High school: Crowell
- College: Texas A&M (1935-1938)
- NFL draft: 1939: 5th round, 38th overall pick

Career history

Playing
- Washington Redskins (1939–1942, 1945–1948)

Coaching
- Texas A&M (1949-1950) Backfield coach; Washington Redskins (1951) Head coach; Midwestern (TX) (1955–1956) Head coach; New York Titans (1960) Backfield coach

Awards and highlights
- NFL champion (1942); Second-team All-Pro (1940); 2× Pro Bowl (1940, 1942); 2× First-team All-SWC (1937, 1938)

Career NFL statistics
- Rushing yards: 1,573
- Rushing average: 4.3
- Receptions: 119
- Receiving yards: 1,826
- Interceptions: 16
- Touchdowns: 34
- Stats at Pro Football Reference

Head coaching record
- Career: NFL: 5–4 (.556); College: 5–15 (.250)
- Coaching profile at Pro Football Reference

Richard S. Todd (October 2, 1914 – November 9, 1999) was an American professional football player and coach for the Washington Redskins of the National Football League (NFL). He was selected in the fifth round of the 1939 NFL draft.

== Biography ==
Dick Todd was born October 2, 1914 in Thrall, Texas.

Fullback Dick Todd (at Right, showing effects of a broken nose) with Wing-back Wilbur Moore (#35) and Left Halfback "Slingin' Sammy" Baugh (C) on the Redskins bench during the 1942 season.

During his eight-year playing career between 1939 and 1948, Todd played both offense and defense as a fullback and defensive back. In his career, Todd had 1,573 yards and 11 touchdowns rushing, and 1,826 yards and 20 touchdowns receiving. He also scored two touchdowns on punt returns.

Todd was named interim coach of the Redskins for nine games in the 1951 season, amassing a 5–4 record. Four years later, Todd was named head coach for the final two Midwestern State Mustangs football team seasons in 1955 and 1956, before the program was placed on a five-year moratorium which would last 32 seasons.

He played college football at Texas A&M University.

Todd died November 9, 1999, in Crowell Texas.

== NFL career statistics ==
Legend
	Won the NFL Championship
	Led the league
**Bold**	Career high

=== Regular season ===
Year	Team	Games		Rushing					Receiving				
Year	Team	GP	GS	Att	Yds	Avg	Lng	TD	Rec	Yds	Avg	Lng	TD
1939	WAS	10	1	57	266	4.7	**60**	2	19	230	12.1	59	3
1940	WAS	11	0	**76**	**408**	5.4	51	**4**	20	402	20.1	**81**	4
1941	WAS	7	6	55	138	2.5	11	1	8	125	15.6	35	1
1942	WAS	11	1	65	195	3.0	22	0	23	328	14.3	53	4
1945	WAS	6	1	7	54	**7.7**	31	0	0	0	0.0	0	0
1946	WAS	11	8	41	266	6.5	29	3	8	107	13.4	23	2
1947	WAS	11	7	10	45	4.5	12	0	4	84	**21.0**	38	0
1948	WAS	12	1	57	201	3.5	21	1	**37**	**550**	14.9	78	**6**
		79	25	368	1,573	4.3	60	11	119	1,826	15.3	81	20

=== Playoffs ===
Year	Team	Games		Rushing					Receiving				
Year	Team	GP	GS	Att	Yds	Avg	Lng	TD	Rec	Yds	Avg	Lng	TD
1940	WAS	1	0	0	0	0.0	0	0	0	0	0.0	0	0
1942	WAS	1	0	**3**	**7**	**2.3**	**10**	0	**1**	**10**	**10.0**	**10**	0
1945	WAS	1	0	1	1	1.0	1	0	0	0	0.0	0	0
		3	0	4	8	2.0	10	0	1	10	10.0	10	0

== Head coaching record ==
=== College ===
Year	Team	Overall	Conference	Standing	Bowl/playoffs
**Midwestern Indians** (Gulf Coast Conference) (1955–1956)
1955	Midwestern	2–8	0–3	4th	
1956	Midwestern	3–7	0–3	4th	
Midwestern:		5–15	0–6		
Total:		5–15			
