= Jack Stackpool =

American football player (1917–1976)

No. 36
- Position: Fullback

Personal information
- Born: September 6, 1917; Chicago, Illinois, U.S.
- Died: August 20, 1976 (aged 58); Lincoln City, Oregon, U.S.
- Listed height: 6 ft 1 in (1.85 m)
- Listed weight: 207 lb (94 kg)

Career information
- High school: Proviso East (Maywood, Illinois)
- College: Washington
- NFL draft: 1942: 10th round, 83rd overall pick

Career history
- Philadelphia Eagles (1942)

Awards and highlights
- Second-team All-PCC (1941)

Career NFL statistics
- Rushing yards: 47
- Rushing average: 3.1
- Receptions: 2
- Receiving yards: 59
- Stats at Pro Football Reference

John Lawrence Stackpool (September 6, 1917 – August 20, 1976) was an American professional football fullback who played in the National Football League (NFL) for the Philadelphia Eagles in 1942. After playing college football for Washington, he was drafted by the Eagles in the tenth round (83rd overall) of the 1942 NFL draft. He served in World War II for the United States Navy after the 1942 NFL season.
