= Ki Aldrich =

American football player (1916–1983)

No. 48, 55, 38
- Positions: Center, linebacker

Personal information
- Born: June 1, 1916; Rogers, Texas, U.S.
- Died: March 12, 1983 (aged 66); Temple, Texas, U.S.
- Listed height: 6 ft 0 in (1.83 m)
- Listed weight: 207 lb (94 kg)

Career information
- High school: Temple
- College: TCU (1935-1938)
- NFL draft: 1939: 1st round, 1st overall pick

Career history

Playing
- Chicago Cardinals (1939–1940); Washington Redskins (1941–1942, 1945–1947)

Coaching
- Washington Redskins (1947) Line coach

Awards and highlights
- NFL champion (1942); 2× Pro Bowl (1939, 1942); National champion (1938); SWC's All-Time Team (1969); Consensus All-American (1938); Second-team All-American (1937); 2× First-team All-SWC (1937, 1938); Cotton Bowl Classic MVP (1937)

Career NFL statistics
- Games played: 73
- Interceptions: 8
- Touchdowns: 2
- Stats at Pro Football Reference
- College Football Hall of Fame

Charles Collins "Ki" Aldrich (June 1, 1916 – March 12, 1983) was an American professional football player. He was inducted into the College Football Hall of Fame in 1960.

== Early life ==
Aldrich was born in Rogers, Texas, and attended Temple High School in Temple, Texas, where he played football. He was named All-State as a center in 1934. He was an All-American center at Texas Christian University in Fort Worth, Texas. At TCU, he played alongside two legendary quarterbacks—Sammy Baugh and Davey O'Brien. Aldrich's senior year, 1938, the Horned Frogs won the National Championship, finishing 11-0 and winning the Sugar Bowl.

== Professional career ==
The Chicago Cardinals made Aldrich the first selection in the 1939 NFL draft, in which his TCU teammates O'Brien and I. B. Hale also were selected in the top ten. He played two seasons for the Cardinals before moving to the Washington Redskins. After two seasons in Washington, he left to serve in the Navy during World War II. He returned to the Redskins in 1945, and retired in 1947. During his professional career, Aldrich averaged 50 minutes of playing time per game.

== After football ==
After retiring from football, Aldirch served as the superintendent at the Lena Pope Orphanage in Fort Worth, Texas. His first wife was the daughter of the founder. He died March 12, 1983, in Temple, Texas.

== Legacy ==
His coach at TCU, Dutch Meyer, said of Aldrich: "That boy wanted to play football more than anyone I ever knew." Baugh called him "the toughest player I ever knew." Aldrich was inducted into the College Football Hall of Fame in 1960 and was named to the Southwest Conference's All-Time Team in 1969.
