= Joe Lamas =

American football player (1916–1996)

No. 29, 28
- Position: Guard

Personal information
- Born: January 10, 1916; Havana, Cuba
- Died: April 22, 1996 (aged 80); Manhasset, New York, U.S.
- Listed height: 5 ft 10 in (1.78 m)
- Listed weight: 216 lb (98 kg)

Career information
- High school: Textile (Manhattan, New York, U.S.)
- College: Mount St. Mary's

Career history
- Pittsburgh Steelers (1942); Seattle Bombers (1944); Portsmouth Pirates (1946)
- Stats at Pro Football Reference

Joseph Francis Lamas (January 10, 1916 – April 22, 1996) was an American professional football player who played one season with the Pittsburgh Steelers of the National Football League (NFL). He played college football at Mount Saint Mary's College and Seminary.

== Early life and college ==
Joseph Francis Lamas was born on January 10, 1916, in Havana, Cuba. He attended Straubenmuller Textile High School in New York, New York.

Lamas played college football at Mount Saint Mary's College and Seminary, with his last year being in 1941.

== Professional career ==
Lamas played in eight games for the Pittsburgh Steelers during the 1942 season. He scored a 29-yard fumble recovery touchdown against the Detroit Lions on November 8, 1942.

Lamas entered military service after the 1942 season and fought during World War II.

He started four games for the Seattle Bombers of the American Football League in 1944.

Lamas played in all ten games, starting six, for the Portsmouth Pirates of the Dixie League during the 1946 season and returned one interception for a touchdown.

== Coaching career ==
Lamas entered Iona Prep in 1952. He was the assistant football coach from 1952 through 1956 and took over the head coaching job from 1957 through 1961. He also coached baseball and worked as the athletic director. On the academic side, he taught Latin, history and health. Lamas retired from Iona Prep in 1979.

== Personal life ==
Lamas died on April 22, 1996, in Manhasset, New York.
