= George Platukis =

American football player (1915–1973)

No. 26, 34, 70
- Positions: End, Defensive end

Personal information
- Born: March 15, 1915; West Hazleton, Pennsylvania, U.S.
- Died: May 17, 1973 (aged 58); Hazleton, Pennsylvania, U.S.
- Listed height: 6 ft 0 in (1.83 m)
- Listed weight: 196 lb (89 kg)

Career information
- High school: West Hazleton
- College: Duquesne (1934-1937)
- NFL draft: 1938: 6th round, 44th overall pick

Career history

Playing
- Boston Shamrocks (1938); Hazleton Redskins (1938); Pittsburgh Pirates/Steelers (1938–1941); Cleveland Rams (1942)

Coaching
- Hazelton Mustangs/Scranton Pros (1964) Line coach

Career NFL statistics
- Receptions: 33
- Receiving yards: 621
- Receiving touchdowns: 6
- Stats at Pro Football Reference

George Paul Platukis (March 15, 1915–May 17, 1973) was an American professional football end who played five seasons in the National Football League (NFL) with the Pittsburgh Steelers and the Cleveland Rams. He later became a high school teacher and baseball coach.

== Early life ==
Platukis was born in West Hazleton, Pennsylvania and attended West Hazleton High School.

He matriculated at Duquesne University.

== Football career ==
Platukis was selected by the Pittsburgh Pirates in the sixth round of the 1938 NFL draft. He played for the Pirates (renamed the Steelers in 1941) for four seasons.

Platukis was traded by the Pittsburgh Steelers in August 1942 to the Cleveland Rams in exchange for John Binotto and Milt Simington. He spent a final season with the Rams.

== Post-football career ==
After completing his football career, Platukis returned to Hazleton, Pennsylvania where he became a high school teacher and head baseball coach at his alma mater, West Hazleton High School.

== Personal life ==
Platukis was married to Irene Pekala. The couple had four children: George Jr., Paulette, Paul and James. He was an ardent fisherman. He died of an apparent heart attack on May 17, 1973, while on a fishing trip near his home with his son and grandson.
