= Andy Farkas =

American football player (1916–2001)

No. 44, 42
- Position: Fullback

Personal information
- Born: May 2, 1916; Clay Center, Ohio, U.S.
- Died: April 10, 2001 (aged 84); Traverse City, Michigan, U.S.
- Listed height: 5 ft 10 in (1.78 m)
- Listed weight: 189 lb (86 kg)

Career information
- High school: University of Detroit Jesuit (Detroit, Michigan)
- College: Detroit (1934–1937)
- NFL draft: 1938: 1st round, 9th overall pick

Career history
- Washington Redskins (1938–1944); Detroit Lions (1945)

Awards and highlights
- NFL champion (1942); 2× First-team All-Pro (1939, 1942); 2× NFL All-Star (1939, 1942); NFL rushing touchdowns leader (1938); NFL scoring leader (1939); Washington Commanders 90 Greatest; NFL record: Longest receiving touchdown: 99 yards (tied)

Career NFL statistics
- Rushing yards: 2,103
- Rushing average: 3.6
- Rushing touchdowns: 21
- Receptions: 80
- Receiving yards: 1,086
- Receiving touchdowns: 13
- Stats at Pro Football Reference

Andrew Geza Farkas (May 2, 1916 – April 10, 2001) was an American professional football fullback who played in the National Football League (NFL) for the Washington Redskins and the Detroit Lions.

== Early life ==
Farkas was born in Clay Center, Ohio of Hungarian origins, and attended St. John's High School in Toledo for two years before moving to Detroit, Michigan and graduating from the University of Detroit Jesuit High School.

== College career ==
Farkas played college football at the University of Detroit Mercy.

== Professional career ==
Farkas was drafted in the first round of the 1938 NFL draft by the Washington Redskins, where he played from 1938 to 1944, and finished his career with the Detroit Lions in 1945. He also led the Redskins in rushing and scoring in 1938–39 and 1942–43, as well as helped lead the Redskins to an NFL Championship in 1942. He led the NFL in scoring and all-purpose yards in 1939.

One of the highlights of his seven-year tour was catching a 99-yard touchdown pass from Frank Filchock on October 15, 1939. In the Eastern Division playoff game on December 19, 1943, he scored three touchdown runs in a 28–0 victory over the New York Giants. His 18 points scored in a playoff game was an NFL record for nine years.

He was elected to the Michigan Sports Hall of Fame, the Ohio Sports Hall of Fame and founded the Gus Dorais Foundation at the University of Detroit in 1955. In 2002, Farkas was named one of the 70 greatest Redskins in team history.

Farkas was pictured wearing eye black as far back as 1942 and is credited as the first player in the NFL to wear it.

== NFL career statistics ==
Legend
	Won the NFL Championship
	Led the league
**Bold**	Career high

=== Regular season ===
Year	Team	Games		Rushing				Receiving			
Year	Team	GP	GS	Att	Yds	Avg	TD	Rec	Yds	Avg	TD
1938	WAS	9	4	75	315	4.2	**6**	9	66	7.3	0
1939	WAS	11	7	**139**	**547**	3.9	5	16	**437**	**27.3**	**5**
1940	WAS	1	0	1	0	0.0	0	0	0	0.0	0
1941	WAS	11	2	85	224	2.6	2	12	77	6.4	0
1942	WAS	10	8	125	468	3.7	3	11	143	13.0	2
1943	WAS	10	8	110	327	3.0	5	**19**	202	10.6	4
1944	WAS	10	6	21	85	4.0	0	4	29	7.3	0
1945	DET	8	3	31	137	**4.4**	0	9	132	14.7	2
		70	38	587	2,103	3.6	21	80	1,086	13.6	13

=== Playoffs ===
Year	Team	Games		Rushing				Receiving			
Year	Team	GP	GS	Att	Yds	Avg	TD	Rec	Yds	Avg	TD
1940	WAS	1	0	0	0	0.0	0	**1**	14	14.0	0
1942	WAS	1	1	12	43	**3.6**	1	0	0	0.0	0
1943	WAS	2	2	**33**	**96**	2.9	**4**	**1**	**17**	**17.0**	**1**
		4	3	45	139	3.1	5	2	31	15.5	1
