= Merl Condit =

American football player (1917–1992)

No. 1, 35, 44, 42
- Position: Halfback

Personal information
- Born: March 21, 1917; Belle Vernon, Pennsylvania, U.S.
- Died: October 18, 1992 (aged 75); Wexford, Pennsylvania, U.S.
- Listed height: 5 ft 11 in (1.80 m)
- Listed weight: 187 lb (85 kg)

Career information
- High school: Charleston (Charleston, West Virginia)
- College: Carnegie Mellon (1936-1939)
- NFL draft: 1940: 2nd round, 15th overall pick

Career history

Playing
- Pittsburgh Steelers (1940); Brooklyn Dodgers (1941–1943); Washington Redskins (1945); Pittsburgh Steelers (1946)

Coaching
- Los Angeles Dons (1947) Ends coach

Awards and highlights
- 2× Pro Bowl (1940, 1942); Second-team All-Eastern (1939)

Career NFL statistics
- Rushing yards: 1,713
- Rushing average: 4.1
- Receptions: 32
- Receiving yards: 323
- Total touchdowns: 14
- Stats at Pro Football Reference

Merlyn Edwin Condit (March 21, 1917 – October 18, 1992), nicknamed "Merlyn the Magician", was an American professional football player who was a halfback in the National Football League (NFL) for the Pittsburgh Steelers, Washington Redskins, and Brooklyn Dodgers. He played college football for the West Virginia Mountaineers and Carnegie Mellon University.

== Professional career ==
The Cleveland Rams selected Condit in the second round of the 1940 NFL draft, but he never played for them, instead joining Pittsburgh as a rookie in 1940, where he earned a selection to the NFL All-Star Game. Condit next played three seasons for the Brooklyn Dodgers between 1941 and 1943. In 1942 Condit finished second in the league in rushing yards and total yards from scrimmage, and first in yards per carry. He was named to his second All-Star Game and was voted 2nd team All-NFL by the AP, NFL, and NY Daily News.

Condit also contributed to Brooklyn's defense and special teams. He intercepted 10 passes for the Dodgers, kicked 5 field goals and 21 extra points, and served as punter and punt returner during his time with the club.

Condit served in World War II during parts of 1943 and 1944. He returned to the NFL in 1945, playing that year for the Washington Redskins. He finished his career with Pittsburgh in 1946.

== NFL career statistics ==
Legend
	Led the league
**Bold**	Career high

=== Regular season ===
Year	Team	Games		Rushing					Receiving				
Year	Team	GP	GS	Att	Yds	Avg	Lng	TD	Rec	Yds	Avg	Lng	TD
1940	PIT	10	2	52	205	3.9	-	0	4	30	7.5	-	**1**
1941	BKN	11	11	91	357	3.9	41	**4**	5	32	6.4	21	0
1942	BKN	11	11	**129**	**647**	**5.0**	**63**	2	**9**	**111**	12.3	56	0
1943	BKN	8	7	67	190	2.8	25	1	7	101	**14.4**	**65**	**1**
1945	WAS	5	0	36	173	4.8	41	3	3	16	5.3	12	0
1946	PIT	9	8	46	141	3.1	23	1	4	33	8.3	23	0
		54	39	421	1,713	4.1	63	11	32	323	10.1	65	2

=== Playoffs ===
Year	Team	Games		Rushing					Receiving				
Year	Team	GP	GS	Att	Yds	Avg	Lng	TD	Rec	Yds	Avg	Lng	TD
1945	WAS	1	1	9	18	2.0	-	0	1	1	1.0	1	0
		1	1	9	18	2.0	-	0	1	1	1.0	1	0
