= Willie Wilkin =

American football player (1916–1973)

- Wilkin in 1942

No. 36, 46
- Position: Offensive tackle

Personal information
- Born: April 20, 1916; Bingham Canyon, Utah, U.S.
- Died: May 16, 1973 (aged 57); Palo Alto, California, U.S.
- Listed height: 6 ft 4 in (1.93 m)
- Listed weight: 261 lb (118 kg)

Career information
- High school: Springville (UT)
- College: St. Mary's (CA) (1934-1937)
- NFL draft: 1938: undrafted

Career history

Playing
- Washington Redskins (1938–1943); Chicago Rockets (1946)

Coaching
- Chicago Rockets (1946) Co-head coach

Awards and highlights
- NFL champion (1942); 2× First-team All-Pro (1941, 1942); 3× Pro Bowl (1940-1942)

Career NFL/AAFC statistics
- Games played: 74
- Games started: 45
- Touchdowns: 1
- Stats at Pro Football Reference

Wilbur Byrne "Wee Willie" Wilkin (April 20, 1916 – May 16, 1973) was an American professional football tackle in the National Football League (NFL) for the Washington Redskins. Wilkin also played in the All-America Football Conference (AAFC) for the Chicago Rockets. He attended St. Mary's College of California.

== Early life ==
Born in Bingham Canyon, Utah, Wilkin attended Springville High School, where he played football, basketball, and track and field.

== College career ==
Wilkin played college football at Saint Mary's College in Moraga, California, graduating in 1938. He was inducted into the Gaels' Athletic Hall of Fame in 1973. After college, Wilkin briefly worked in a silver mine in Mexico.

== NFL ==
Wilkin signed with the Washington Redskins of the National Football League in 1938, and played through 1943. During that span, he played in three NFL Championship games, winning the 1942 NFL Championship Game. He also scored the only touchdown of his career off of a blocked punt in a 33–14 win over the Cleveland Rams in Week 5 of the 1942 season.

== Military career ==
After the 1943 season, Wilkin entered the United States Marine Corps during World War II. While in service, he was stationed at Marine Corps Air Station El Toro in southern California and played for their football team.

== AAFC ==
After his service with the Marines ended, Wilkin signed with the Chicago Rockets of the All-America Football Conference in 1946.

== Teaching and coaching ==
After retiring from football, Wilkin became a math and social studies high school teacher for special needs children in Monterey County, California, and was an offensive line coach for Monterey High School. He later taught in Deer Lodge, Montana.

== Personal ==
Wilkin was married and had twin sons, John Sharpe Wilkin and Christopher Wilkin; both died at age 22 in the same 1965 automobile accident near Truckee, California. In 1970, Wilkin had a brain tumor successfully removed. However, two years later, he developed stomach cancer, and died at age 57 in 1973 in Palo Alto, California.
