= Chuck Cherundolo =

American football player and coach (1916–2012)

No. 17, 21, 73
- Positions: Center, Linebacker

Personal information
- Born: August 8, 1916; Old Forge, Pennsylvania, U.S.
- Died: December 22, 2012 (aged 96); Lakeland, Florida, U.S.
- Listed height: 6 ft 1 in (1.85 m)
- Listed weight: 215 lb (98 kg)

Career information
- High school: Old Forge
- College: Penn State (1933-1936)
- NFL draft: 1937: undrafted

Career history

Playing
- Cleveland Rams (1937–1939); Philadelphia Eagles (1940); Pittsburgh Steelers (1941–1942, 1945–1948)

Coaching
- Pittsburgh Steelers (1949–1952) Assistant coach; Pittsburgh Steelers (1953) Line coach; Pittsburgh Steelers (1954–1957, 1961) Assistant coach; Philadelphia Eagles (1962–1963) Defensive line coach; Washington Redskins (1964–1965) Defense coach; Chicago Bears (1966–1968) Assistant coach; Tri-City Apollos (1969) Head coach; Chicago Bears (1972–1974) Defensive line coach

Awards and highlights
- Second-team All-Pro (1938); 2× NFL All-Star (1941, 1942); Pittsburgh Steelers Legends team

Career NFL statistics
- Games played: 106
- Games started: 81
- Interceptions: 5
- Stats at Pro Football Reference

Charles James Cherundolo Jr. (August 8, 1916 – December 22, 2012) was an American professional football player and coach. He played center and linebacker for ten seasons in the National Football League (NFL) with the Cleveland Rams, Philadelphia Eagles and Pittsburgh Steelers. He was born in Old Forge, Pennsylvania.

== Playing career ==
Cherundolo played college football at Penn State, where he was a voted a team captain in 1936. He was named All-America at Penn State. He went on to play ten seasons in the NFL.

== Coaching career ==
Cherundolo was hired by the Steelers as an assistant coach upon the end of his playing career. He coached with the Steelers from 1949 through 1958, leaving football in 1959. Cherundolo returned to the Steelers in 1960 as a part-time scout and returned as a full-time assistant coach for the 1961 season. He went on to coach for the Philadelphia Eagles with head coach and friend Nick Skorich in 1962 and 1963, then went on to coach with the Washington Redskins until 1966, when he coached for the Chicago Bears for a total of eight years, interrupted by a one-year coaching job for the Tri-City Apollos of Midland, Michigan. He coached a total of 22 years in the NFL with four teams.

== Awards and honors ==
Cherundolo was selected to two NFL All-Star Teams during his playing career. He was named second-team All-NFL in three seasons.

In 2007, as part of the team's 75th anniversary commemoration, the Steelers named him as the center on their Legends team. The team represents the best players in the franchise's history through 1970.

== Personal life ==
Cherundolo married Margaret Whitehead; the couple had two children, Patricia and John. Both his son and grandson played football at the Division I level. At the time of his death in 2012, he was the fourth-oldest living professional football player.
