= Bill Halverson (American football) =

American football player (1919–1984)

No. 75
- Position: Tackle

Personal information
- Born: May 4, 1919; Davenport, Iowa, U.S.
- Died: May 1, 1984 (aged 64); Multnomah County, Oregon, U.S.
- Listed height: 6 ft 3 in (1.91 m)
- Listed weight: 242 lb (110 kg)

Career information
- High school: Benson Polytechnic (Portland, Oregon)
- College: Oregon State
- NFL draft: 1942: 8th round, 63rd overall pick

Career history
- Philadelphia Eagles (1942); Los Angeles Dons (1946)*
- * Offseason or practice squad member only

Career NFL statistics
- Games played: 8
- Stats at Pro Football Reference

William Meral Halverson (May 4, 1919 – May 1, 1984) was an American professional football tackle for played in the National Football League (NFL) for the Philadelphia Eagles in 1942. After playing college football for Oregon State, he was drafted by the Eagles in the eighth round (63rd overall) of the 1942 NFL draft. He served in World War II for the United States Army after the 1942 NFL season.
