= Tom Robertson (American football) =

American football player (1917–1998)

Profile
- Position: Center

Personal information
- Born: July 25, 1917; Lawton, Oklahoma
- Died: May 3, 1998 (aged 80); Tulsa, Oklahoma
- Listed height: 6 ft 0 in (1.83 m)
- Listed weight: 199 lb (90 kg)

Career information
- High school: Duncan (OK)
- College: Kansas, LSU, Tulsa

Career history
- Brooklyn Dodgers (1941-1942); New York Yankees (1946)
- Stats at Pro Football Reference

Thomas Blane Robertson (July 25, 1917 – May 3, 1998) was an American football center.

Robertson was born in Oklahoma in 1917 and attended Duncan High School in Duncan, Oklahoma. He played college football at Kansas, LSU, and Tulsa.

He played professional football for the Brooklyn Dodgers in the National Football League in 1941 and 1942 and for the New York Yankees of the All-America Football Conference in 1946. He appeared in 34 games for the Dodgers and Yankees, 21 of them as a starter.

He died in 1998 in Tulsa, Oklahoma.
