= Bob Priestley (American football) =

American football player (1920–2015)

Profile
- Position: End

Personal information
- Born: January 5, 1920; Everett, Massachusetts
- Died: May 20, 2015 (aged 95); South Yarmouth, Massachusetts
- Listed height: 5 ft 11 in (1.80 m)
- Listed weight: 192 lb (87 kg)

Career information
- High school: Melrose (MA)
- College: Brown

Career history
- Philadelphia Eagles (1942)
- Stats at Pro Football Reference

Robert Bagley Priestley (January 5, 1920 – May 20, 2015) was an American football end who played one season with the Philadelphia Eagles of the National Football League. He played college football at the Brown University and attended Melrose High School in Melrose, Massachusetts. In 1979, he was inducted into the Brown Athletic Hall of Fame. Priestley also was a coach of ice hockey and football at Norwich University. He was also on the selection committee for the United States men's national ice hockey team that represented the nation in the 1980 Winter Olympics. He died at the age of 95 on May 20, 2015.
