= Fred Meyer (American football) =

American football player (1919–1996)

- Meyer in 1942

No. 89
- Positions: End, defensive end

Personal information
- Born: September 29, 1919; Mount Sterling, Illinois, U.S.
- Died: July 10, 1996 (aged 76); Fort Morgan, Alabama, U.S.
- Listed height: 6 ft 2 in (1.88 m)
- Listed weight: 190 lb (86 kg)

Career information
- High school: Classen School of Advanced Studies (Oklahoma City, Oklahoma)
- College: Stanford
- NFL draft: 1942: 12th round, 103rd overall pick

Career history
- Philadelphia Eagles (1942, 1945)

Awards and highlights
- NCAA national champion (1940); 2× First-team All-PCC (1940, 1941)

Career NFL statistics
- Receptions: 27
- Receiving yards: 459
- Touchdowns: 2
- Stats at Pro Football Reference

Frederic D. Meyer (September 29, 1919 – July 10, 1996) was an American professional football end who played in the National Football League (NFL) for the Philadelphia Eagles in 1942 and 1945. After playing college football for Stanford, he was drafted by the Eagles in the 12th round (103rd overall) of the 1942 NFL draft.

During the 1942 season, he ranked among the NFL's leaders with 324 receiving yards (sixth) and 32.4 receiving yards per game (fifth).

Meyer's career was interrupted in 1943 by World War II, during which he served in the United States Navy. He rejoined the Eagles in 1945, seeing action in 8 games as a reserve.
