= 1942 Green Bay Packers season =

NFL team season

- Head coach: Curly Lambeau
- Home stadium: City Stadium; Wisconsin State Fair Park

Results
- Record: 8–2–1
- Division place: 2nd NFL Western
- Playoffs: Did not qualify

The 1942 Green Bay Packers season was their 24th season overall and their 22nd season in the National Football League. The team finished with an 8–2–1 record under coach Curly Lambeau, earning a second-place finish in the Western Conference.

== Offseason ==
=== NFL draft ===
Round	Pick	Player	Position	School/club team
1	9	Urban Odson	Tackle	Minnesota
3	24	Ray Frankowski	Guard	Washington
5	39	Bill Green	Back	Iowa
6	49	Joe Krivonak	Guard	South Carolina
7	59	Pres Johnston	Back	SMU
8	69	Joe Rogers	End	Michigan
9	79	Noah Langdale	Tackle	Alabama
10	89	Gene Flick	Center	Minnesota
11	99	Tom Farris	Back	Wisconsin
12	109	Jimmy Richardson	Back	Marquette
13	119	Bruce Smith	Halfback	Minnesota
14	129	Bill Applegate	Guard	South Carolina
15	139	Jim Trimble	Tackle	Indiana
16	149	Tom Kinkade	Back	Ohio State
17	159	Fred Preston	End	Nebraska
18	169	Robert Ingalls	Center	Michigan
19	179	George Benson	Back	Northwestern
20	189	Horace Young	Back	SMU
21	194	Henry Woronicz	End	Boston College
22	199	Woody Adams	Tackle	TCU

== Regular season ==
=== Schedule ===
Week	Date	Opponent	Result	Record
1	September 27	**Chicago Bears**	**L** 28–44	0–1
2	October 4	at **Chicago Cardinals**	**W** 17–13	1–1
3	October 11	**Detroit Lions**	**W** 38–7	2–1
4	October 18	**Cleveland Rams**	**W** 45–28	3–1
5	October 25	at **Detroit Lions**	**W** 28–7	4–1
6	November 1	**Chicago Cardinals**	**W** 55–24	5–1
7	November 8	at **Cleveland Rams**	**W** 30–12	6–1
8	November 15	at **Chicago Bears**	**L** 7–38	6–2
9	November 22	at New York Giants	**T** 21–21	6–2–1
10	November 29	at Philadelphia Eagles	**W** 7–0	7–2–1
11	December 6	Pittsburgh Steelers	**W** 24–21	8–2–1
Note: Intra-division opponents are in **bold** text.

== Standings ==
NFL Western Division
	W	L	T	PCT	DIV	PF	PA	STK
Chicago Bears	11	0	0	1.000	8–0	376	84	W11
Green Bay Packers	8	2	1	.800	6–2	300	215	W2
Cleveland Rams	5	6	0	.455	3–5	150	207	L1
Chicago Cardinals	3	8	0	.273	3–5	98	209	L6
Detroit Lions	0	11	0	.000	0–8	38	263	L11

Note: Tie games were not officially counted in the standings until 1972.

== Roster ==
1942 Green Bay Packers final roster
**Backs**: 16 Lou Brock RB/CB/P; 3 Tony Canadeo RB/CB/P; 54 Larry Craig RB/S; 64 Ted Fritsch FB/LB/K; 17 Cecil Isbell RB/CB; 8 Bob Kahler RB/CB; 24 Joe Laws RB/CB; 38 Chuck Sample FB/LB; 63 Ben Starret RB/S; 42 Andy Uram RB/CB; 33 Dick Weisgerber RB/S	**Linemen/Linebackers**: 47 Paul Berezney T/DT; 29 Charley Brock C/LB; 75 Tiny Croft T/DT; 35 Bob Flowers C/LB; 43 Buckets Goldenberg G/DG; 53 Bob Ingalls C/LB; 72 Royal Kahler T/DT; 45 Bill Kuusisto G/DG; 46 Russ Letlow G/DG; 44 Baby Ray T/DT; 21 Pete Tinsley G/DG; 18 Fred Vant Hull T/G/DT/DG	**Ends/Receivers**: 58 Joe Carter; 14 Don Hutson K; 48 Harry Jacunski; 7 Joel Mason; 23 Earl Ohlgren; 5 Ray Riddick; 51 John Stonebraker; **Reserve**: 22 Ernie Pannell T/DT; Rookies in italics

== Awards and records ==
- Don Hutson, NFL receiving leader, 58 receptions
- Cecil Isbell, NFL leader, passing yards (2,021)
