= Bill Dudley =

American football player (1921–2010)

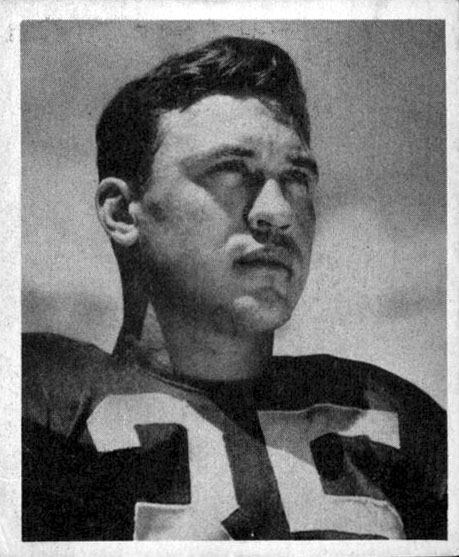
- Dudley displayed on a Bowman card, 1948

No. 35, 44
- Positions: Halfback, safety, return specialist

Personal information
- Born: December 24, 1921; Bluefield, Virginia, U.S.
- Died: February 4, 2010 (aged 88); Lynchburg, Virginia, U.S.
- Listed height: 5 ft 10 in (1.78 m)
- Listed weight: 182 lb (83 kg)

Career information
- High school: Graham (Bluefield)
- College: Virginia (1939–1941)
- NFL draft: 1942: 1st round, 1st overall pick

Career history

Playing
- Pittsburgh Steelers (1942; 1945–1946); Detroit Lions (1947–1949); Washington Redskins (1950–1951; 1953)

Coaching
- Washington Redskins (1953) Backfield coach; Pittsburgh Steelers (1956) Backfield coach

Awards and highlights
- NFL Most Valuable Player (1946); 4× First-team All-Pro (1942, 1946–1948); 2× Second-team All-Pro (1951, 1952); 3× Pro Bowl (1942, 1950, 1951); 2× NFL rushing yards leader (1942, 1946); NFL interceptions leader (1946); 2× NFL punt return yards leader (1942, 1946); NFL 1940s All-Decade Team; 80 Greatest Redskins; Washington Commanders Ring of Fame; Pittsburgh Steelers Legends team; Pittsburgh Steelers Hall of Honor; Maxwell Award (1941); Consensus All-American (1941); Third-team All-American (1940); Virginia Cavaliers No. 35 retired

Career NFL statistics
- Rushing yards: 3,057
- Rushing average: 4.0
- Receptions: 123
- Receiving yards: 1,383
- Return yards: 3,258
- Interceptions: 23
- Total touchdowns: 44
- Military career
- Allegiance: United States
- Branch: U.S. Army Air Corps
- Service years: 1942–1945
- Conflicts: World War II; Pacific Theater
- Stats at Pro Football Reference
- Pro Football Hall of Fame
- College Football Hall of Fame

William McGarvey Dudley (December 24, 1921 – February 4, 2010), nicknamed "Bullet Bill", was an American professional football halfback, safety and return specialist who played in the National Football League (NFL) for the Pittsburgh Steelers, Detroit Lions, and Washington Redskins. He was inducted into the Pro Football Hall of Fame in 1966. He and Deion Sanders are the only players in NFL history to score touchdowns in six different ways (rushing, receiving, punt return, kickoff return, interception return, and fumble return).

== Early life ==
Dudley was born in Bluefield, Virginia and attended Graham High School. He made the football team his junior year, and in 1938 he kicked a 35-yard field goal in the season's finale and helped Graham beat favored Princeton High School, 10–7.

== College career ==
At the age of 16, Dudley was awarded an athletic scholarship by the University of Virginia football team by coach Frank Murray. As a result, he received a $500 grant, out of which he paid for room, board, and books. He also pledged and became a brother of the Sigma Alpha Epsilon fraternity. Although he was originally slated as a punter and placekicker, Dudley eventually came to play the halfback position. In his sophomore year, he began as the fifth back on the depth chart but, due to a teammate's injury, played several games.

By his third year, Dudley started every game and was the leader in total offensive yards amongst schools in the South. He was also successful in his senior year, particularly during a game against the University of North Carolina. In that game, Dudley scored all three touchdowns for Virginia and kicked four extra points. That season, he became the first Virginia player to earn All-American honors and was awarded the Maxwell Award for best college football player of the year. He was also named the best college player of the year by the Washington D.C. Touchdown Club. Dudley also led the nation in four categories: touchdowns with 18; points scored with 134; rushing average with 6.2 yards a play; and touchdowns responsible for with 29. After the season, he played in the East–West Shrine Game, where he intercepted four passes and threw for his team's touchdown in a 6–6 tie. He also played in the College All-Star Game in Chicago.

== NFL rookie season (1942) ==
Dudley was drafted in the 1942 NFL draft with the first overall pick by the Pittsburgh Steelers. During the 1942 season, he led the league in rushing with 696 yards on 162 carries and was then named to the All-Pro team. He also completed 35 of 94 passes for 438 yards and two touchdowns, punted 18 times for a 32.0 average, returned 20 punts for 271 yards (14.0 avg), and ran back 11 kickoffs for 298 yards (27.0 avg), scoring once. In the first game of his professional career, Dudley ran for a 55-yard touchdown and in his second game scored on a kickoff return.

== Military service (1943–45) ==
In 1942, the U. S. armed services began drafting all eligible young men to fight in World War II. Dudley originally enlisted and was sworn into the Naval Air Corps; however, they found out he needed to have his parents' consent, since he was not yet 21. Dudley then enlisted in U. S. Army Air Corps in September 1942, but there was an influx of recruits and Dudley was told he would have to wait three months before he began training. This delay made it possible for him to finish his rookie season with the Steelers.

Dudley went through basic training in Florida and then attended flight school in Texas. He then joined the Army's football team. In 1944, Dudley helped his team to a 12–0 record and was named the Most Valuable Player. At the end of the season, Dudley was shipped to the Pacific and flew two supply missions. He was then sent to Hawaii where the Army selected him to play in three more football games against All-Star teams.

== Return to the NFL (1945–53) ==
Dudley returned to Pittsburgh that fall and rejoined the Steelers's team for the last four games of the 1945 season. In a game against the Chicago Cardinals, he ran for two touchdowns and kicked for two additional points and became the Steelers' leading scorer for that season. He also rushed for 204 yards and returned three kickoffs for 65 yards.

In 1946, the Steelers hired a new coach Jock Sutherland and Dudley scored 48 points, which contributed to the Steelers' 5–5–1 record. During that season, he became the league leader in rushing (604 yards), interceptions (10 total which he returned for 242 yards) and punt returns (27 total for 385 yards). In doing this, Dudley became the only NFL player to lead in four unique statistical categories. He was named All-Pro and was awarded the NFL's Most Valuable Player Award. Dudley became the first (and as of 2007, only) person to win MVP awards in college, service, and professional levels.

"Despite his lack of breakaway speed, Bill was the most
feared kickoff returner in the game. He passed sidearm,
like a kid, yet he had a fine completion average. He was
'too small,' but he was hardly ever hurt too badly to play.
He was the league's top ground gainer, yet he was also one
of the fiercest defensive tacklers and the best in the game at
interceptions. As one of the men who faced him ruefully admitted,
Bill could not throw a pass correctly and 'ran as if he was
staggering,' yet he could always find a way to beat you."

— Journalist Robert Smith, on Dudley's ability.

Dudley was traded to the Detroit Lions after 1946, where he was offered a three-year contract and $20,000 a season. He was elected captain of his team all three years, 1947–1949. During his first year with the Lions, the team finished last. On October 19, 1947, against the Chicago Bears, Dudley returned a punt for an 84-yard touchdown. During 1947, he scored 13 touchdowns; seven on pass receptions, four on runs from scrimmage, one on a punt return, one on kickoff return and throwing two. In his last season with the Lions, he led Detroit in scoring for the third year in a row.

At the end of the 1949 season, Lions coach Bo McMillin traded Dudley to the Washington Redskins, where he played for three seasons, during which he led the team in scoring every year. On December 3, 1950, Dudley fielded a 60-yard punt kicked by Steelers' player Joe Geri. He ran over 30 yards before he reached his hands out of bounds, while keeping both feet in bounds, and caught the punt at the Redskin's four-yard line, and then ran it for a 96-yard touchdown. Dudley took a break during the 1952 season but returned in 1953. He retired at the end of the season due to knee injuries and an overall physical deterioration.

Dudley was named first- or second-team All-NFL six times in his career and was named to three Pro Bowls. During his nine pro seasons, Dudley gained 3,057 yards on 765 rushing attempts, a 4.0 average, and scored 20 touchdowns; caught 123 passes for 1,383 yards and 18 touchdowns; returned 124 punts for 1,515 yards and three touchdowns; ran back 78 kickoffs for 1,743 yards and one touchdown; intercepted 23 passes and returned them for 459 yards and two touchdowns; and punted 191 times for a 38.2-yard average. He added 121 extra points and 33 field goals to his 44 touchdowns for a total of 484 points. Dudley led his team in scoring during every one of his nine NFL seasons.

Dudley is the only player ever with a rushing touchdown, touchdown reception, punt return for touchdown, kickoff return for touchdown, interception return for touchdown, fumble return for a touchdown, and a touchdown pass. He also had a touchdown via lateral and kicked PATs and field goals.

== NFL career statistics ==
Legend
	Led the league
**Bold**	Career high

Year	Team	Games		Rushing					Receiving				
Year	Team	GP	GS	Att	Yds	Avg	Lng	TD	Rec	Yds	Avg	Lng	TD
1942	PIT	11	11	**162**	**696**	4.3	**66**	**5**	1	24	24.0	24	0
1945	PIT	4	4	57	204	3.6	32	3	0	0	0.0	0	0
1946	PIT	11	11	146	604	4.1	41	2	4	109	**27.3**	**80**	1
1947	DET	9	8	80	302	3.8	28	2	**27**	**375**	13.9	64	**7**
1948	DET	7	4	33	97	2.9	11	0	20	210	10.5	22	6
1949	DET	12	10	125	402	3.2	26	3	**27**	190	7.0	18	2
1950	WAS	12	11	66	339	**5.1**	27	1	22	172	7.8	17	1
1951	WAS	12	12	91	398	4.4	40	2	22	303	13.8	40	1
1953	WAS	12	0	5	15	3.0	7	0	0	0	0.0	0	0
Career		90	71	765	3,057	4.0	66	18	123	1,383	11.2	80	18

== After football ==
After retiring, Dudley was a scout for the Steelers and the Lions. In 1951, he then entered the insurance business in Lynchburg, Virginia with his brother Jim.

Dudley was elected to the College Football Hall of Fame in 1956, the Pro Football Hall of Fame in 1966, and the Virginia Sports Hall of Fame in 1972. The Downtown Club of Richmond, Virginia has sponsored the Bill Dudley Award since 1990, awarded each year to the state's top college football player. Dudley is an unlockable free agent running back in the videogame Madden NFL 08.

Dudley served four terms in the Virginia House of Delegates.

Dudley suffered a massive stroke on January 30, 2010. He died in his home in Lynchburg, Virginia on February 4, 2010.

== See also ==
- List of NCAA major college football yearly scoring leaders
