= Clem Stralka =

American football player (1913–1994)

No. 39
- Positions: Guard, tackle

Personal information
- Born: May 19, 1913; Glen Lyon, Pennsylvania, U.S.
- Died: January 10, 1994 (aged 80); Denver, Colorado, U.S.
- Listed height: 5 ft 10 in (1.78 m)
- Listed weight: 215 lb (98 kg)

Career information
- High school: Pennington (NJ) Prep
- College: Georgetown

Career history
- Washington Redskins (1938–1942, 1945–1946)

Awards and highlights
- NFL champion (1942); Pro Bowl (1942)
- Stats at Pro Football Reference

Clement Frank Stralka (May 19, 1913 – January 10, 1994) was an American football guard and tackle in the National Football League (NFL) for the Washington Redskins. He played college football at Georgetown University. After leaving the NFL, he became a football coach at the United States Merchant Marine Academy in Kings Point, New York.
