= John Binotto =

American football player (1919–2016)

No. 5
- Position: Halfback

Personal information
- Born: November 24, 1919; Lawrence, Pennsylvania, U.S.
- Died: February 19, 2016 (aged 96); Peters Township, Pennsylvania, U.S.
- Listed height: 5 ft 10 in (1.78 m)
- Listed weight: 185 lb (84 kg)

Career information
- High school: Cecil High School, Cecil Pennsylvania
- College: Duquesne University

Career history
- Pittsburgh Steelers (1942); Philadelphia Eagles (1942)

Career statistics as of Week 11, 1942
- Games Played: 9
- Games Started: 1
- Rushing Attempts / Yds: 17 / 47
- Punt returns / Yds: 2 / 25
- Stats at Pro Football Reference

John M. Binotto (November 24, 1919 – February 19, 2016) was an American professional football halfback who played one season in the NFL with the Pittsburgh Steelers and the Philadelphia Eagles.

== Early life ==
Binotto was born in Lawrence, Pennsylvania, and attended Cecil High School in Cecil, Pennsylvania.

He matriculated at Duquesne University.

== Football career ==
Binotto was acquired by the Pittsburgh Steelers in August 1942 from the Cleveland Rams in exchange for George Platukis. Binotto appeared in seven games for the Steelers in 1942, starting in one. Binotto was released by the Steelers in October 1942.

Binotto joined the Philadelphia Eagles later that season, and appeared in two games for them.
