= 1942 NFL season =

American football season

- 1942 edition of the NFL's press manual

Regular season
- Duration: September 13 to December 13, 1942
- East Champions: Washington Redskins
- West Champions: Chicago Bears

Championship Game
- Champions: Washington Redskins

NFL teams: West, East

The 1942 NFL season was the 23rd regular season of the National Football League. Before the season, many players left for service in World War II, thus depleting the rosters of all the teams.

The ten teams of the NFL each played an 11 game schedule during the 1942 regular season, for a league total of 55 contests.

Continuing their Chicago Bears finished the regular season at 11–0, and faced the 10–1 Washington Redskins in the championship game. Washington, which had been embarrassed by a massive 73–0 shutout loss in the 1940 Championship Play-off, got a measure of revenge by spoiling the Bears' hope for a perfect season, winning the rematch 14–6.

== Draft ==
The 1942 NFL draft was held on December 22, 1941, at Chicago's Palmer House Hotel. With the first pick, the Pittsburgh Steelers selected runningback Bill Dudley from the University of Virginia.

== Major changes for 1942 ==
=== Rules changes ===
- The use of flags on flexible shafts to mark the intersections of goal lines and side lines (the predecessor to the pylon) becomes mandatory.
- A clarification to the offsides rule is added: The center or snapper is not offsides unless a portion of his body is ahead of the defensive team's line.
- A half cannot end on a double foul. Instead, the period will be extended by one untimed down.
- Detachable kicking toes are prohibited.
- When an encroachment or false start causes the other team to be offsides, only the initial foul is penalized.
- A forward pass that first touches an ineligible receiver may be intercepted.
- If the offensive team commits pass interference in their opponent's end zone, it is an automatic touchback.

=== Coaching changes ===
- Brooklyn Dodgers: Jock Sutherland was replaced by Mike Getto.
- Chicago Bears: George Halas stepped down after five games in 1942 to serve in the U.S. Navy during World War II. In his place, Hunk Anderson and Luke Johnsos served as co-coaches of the Bears.
- Detroit Lions: Bill Edwards was released after three games in 1942. John Karcis served for the final eight games.

=== Stadium changes ===
- The Cleveland Rams moved from Cleveland Municipal Stadium to League Park
- The Philadelphia Eagles moved back from Philadelphia Municipal Stadium to Shibe Park, where they played in 1940

== Final standings ==
NFL Eastern Division
| | W | L | T | PCT | DIV | PF | PA | STK |
|---|---|---|---|---|---|---|---|---|
| Washington Redskins | 10 | 1 | 0 | .909 | 7–1 | 227 | 102 | W9 |
| Pittsburgh Steelers | 7 | 4 | 0 | .636 | 5–3 | 167 | 119 | L1 |
| New York Giants | 5 | 5 | 1 | .500 | 4–4 | 155 | 139 | W2 |
| Brooklyn Dodgers | 3 | 8 | 0 | .273 | 2–6 | 100 | 168 | L6 |
| Philadelphia Eagles | 2 | 9 | 0 | .182 | 2–6 | 134 | 239 | L1 |

Note: Tie games were not officially counted in the standings until 1972.

NFL Western Division
| | W | L | T | PCT | DIV | PF | PA | STK |
|---|---|---|---|---|---|---|---|---|
| Chicago Bears | 11 | 0 | 0 | 1.000 | 8–0 | 376 | 84 | W11 |
| Green Bay Packers | 8 | 2 | 1 | .800 | 6–2 | 300 | 215 | W2 |
| Cleveland Rams | 5 | 6 | 0 | .455 | 3–5 | 150 | 207 | L1 |
| Chicago Cardinals | 3 | 8 | 0 | .273 | 3–5 | 98 | 209 | L6 |
| Detroit Lions | 0 | 11 | 0 | .000 | 0–8 | 38 | 263 | L11 |

Note: Tie games were not officially counted in the standings until 1972.

== NFL Championship Game ==
The NFL Champions of 1942 — the Washington Redskins.

- Washington 14, Chi. Bears 6, at Griffith Stadium, Washington, D.C., December 13, 1942

== Team statistics ==
These statistics include the 11 regularly scheduled games played by each team and exclude the Championship game. A new league record for passing was set by the Green Bay Packers, with 2,407 yards gained through the air. The Packers also set new records for most passes completed in a season (172) and most touchdowns passing (28). The Washington Redskins, featuring the passing of Sammy Baugh, set a new NFL record for passing accuracy, completing 53.4% of their 257 pass attempts as a team. Also worthy of note is the point differential of the undefeated Chicago Bears, who amassed 376 points (34.1 points per game) while giving up just 84 (7.6 points per game) — both league bests.

| Rank | Team | Total yards | (Rushing) | (Passing) | Penalized | Yards allowed | Takeaways | Turnovers |
|---|---|---|---|---|---|---|---|---|
| 1 | Chicago Bears | 3,900 | 1,926 | 1,974 | 905 | 1,703 | 43 | 43 |
| 2 | Green Bay Packers | 3,790 | 1,383 | 2,407 | 312 | 3,076 | 48 | 26 |
| 3 | Washington Redskins | 3,121 | 1,521 | 1,600 | 610 | 1,950 | 26 | 30 |
| 4 | Pittsburgh Steelers | 2,606 | 1,920 | 686 | 383 | 2,383 | 31 | 18 |
| 5 | Philadelphia Eagles | 2,535 | 1,119 | 1,416 | 392 | 3,016 | 28 | 28 |
| 6 | Chicago Cardinals | 2,453 | 1,021 | 1,432 | 400 | 2,972 | 33 | 40 |
| 7 | Cleveland Rams | 2,413 | 876 | 1,537 | 315 | 3,544 | 33 | 35 |
| 8 | Brooklyn Dodgers | 2,219 | 1,505 | 714 | 288 | 2,794 | 26 | 34 |
| 9 | Detroit Lions | 2,206 | 1,321 | 885 | 364 | 3,083 | 28 | 56 |
| 10 | New York Giants | 2,160 | 1,203 | 957 | 437 | 2,877 | 34 | 21 |
Source: Strickler (ed.), 1943 NFL Roster and Record Manual, pp. 74-75. Takeaways = (Interceptions + Fumble recoveries)

== Individual leaders ==
=== Rushing ===
The longest run of 1942 in the NFL was by Lloyd Cardwell of Detroit, 80 yards.

| Rank | Name | Team | Yards rushing | Attempts | Per carry | Long gain | Rushing TDs |
|---|---|---|---|---|---|---|---|
| 1 | "Bullet Bill" Dudley | Pittsburgh Steelers | 696 | 162 | 4.3 | 66 | 5 |
| 2 | Merl Condit | Brooklyn Dodgers | 647 | 129 | 5.0 | 63 | 3 |
| 3 | Gary Famiglietti | Chicago Bears | 503 | 118 | 4.2 | 21 | 8 |
| 4 | Andy Farkas | Washington Redskins | 468 | 125 | 3.7 | 22 | 4 |
| 5 | Dick Riffle | Pittsburgh Steelers | 467 | 115 | 4.0 | 44 | 4 |
| 6 | Marshall "Biggie" Goldberg | Chicago Cardinals | 369 | 116 | 3.1 | 29 | 2 |
| 7 | Merle Hapes | New York Giants | 363 | 95 | 3.8 | 52 | 3 |
| 8 | Dante Magnani | Cleveland Rams | 344 | 59 | 5.8 | 71 | 2 |
| 9 | Frank "Monk" Maznicki | Chicago Bears | 343 | 54 | 6.3 | 42 | 1 |
| 10 | Gaylon Smith | Cleveland Rams | 332 | 83 | 4.0 | 50 | 2 |
Source: Strickler (ed.), 1943 NFL Roster and Record Manual, pp. 82–83.

=== Receiving ===
Packers end Don Hutson led the league in receiving and was selected Most Valuable Player for the second straight year.

Top receiver in the NFL in 1942 — for the fifth time in eight seasons — was Don Hutson of the Packers. In this second of two back-to-back MVP years, Hutson set new NFL records for total receiving yards (1,211), receptions (74), and touchdowns receiving (17). He also led the league in scoring, setting a new league record with 138 points scored in just an 11 game season. He also expanded his career records for touchdowns (72) and yards receiving (5,515).

The league as a whole set a record for touchdown passes with 108, topping the matching 100 TD seasons of 1940 and 1941.

| Rank | Name | Team | Receiving yards | Receptions | Per catch | Long gain | Touchdowns |
|---|---|---|---|---|---|---|---|
| 1 | Don Hutson | Green Bay Packers | 1,211 | 74 | 16.4 | 73 | 17 |
| 2 | Ray "Scooter" McLean | Chicago Bears | 571 | 19 | 30.1 | 68 | 8 |
| 3 | Andy Uram | Green Bay Packers | 420 | 21 | 20.0 | 64 | 4 |
| 4 | "Big Jim" Benton | Cleveland Rams | 345 | 23 | 15.0 | 45 | 1 |
| 5 | Dick Todd | Washington Redskins | 328 | 23 | 14.3 | 53 | 4 |
| 6 | Fred Meyer | Philadelphia Eagles | 323 | 16 | 20.2 | 60 | 1 |
| 7 | Hamp Pool | Chicago Bears | 321 | 10 | 32.1 | 64 | 5 |
| 8 | Ben Hightower | Cleveland Rams | 317 | 19 | 16.7 | 59 | 3 |
| 9 | Johnny Martin | Chicago Cardinals | 312 | 22 | 14.2 | 69 | 0 |
| 10 | Bob Masterson | Washington Redskins | 308 | 22 | 14.0 | 33 | 2 |
Source: Strickler (ed.), 1943 NFL Roster and Record Manual, pp. 86-87.

=== Passing ===
Green Bay's Cecil Isbell became the NFL's first back-to-back passing champion in 1942. He set new season records for passing yards (2,021), completions (146), and touchdown passes (24) — also tying a league record by throwing six touchdown passes in one game. Also delivering an MVP-caliber performance was Sammy Baugh of the Redskins, who also topped the old NFL records for passing yards, completions, and touchdown passes, while helping Washington set a new team record for completion percentage (53.3%).

| Rank | Name | Team | Passing Yards | Complete - Attempt | Percentage | TD : INT | Longest |
|---|---|---|---|---|---|---|---|
| 1 | Cecil Isbell | Green Bay Packers | 2,021 | 146-for-268 | 54.5% | 24 : 14 | 73 |
| 2 | Sammy Baugh | Washington Redskins | 1,524 | 132-for-225 | 58.7% | 16 : 11 | 53 |
| 3 | Tommy Thompson | Philadelphia Eagles | 1,410 | 95-for-203 | 46.8% | 8 : 16 | 65 |
| 4 | Bud Schwenk | Chicago Cardinals | 1,350 | 126-for-295 | 42.7% | 6 : 27 | 69 |
| 5 | Sid Luckman | Chicago Bears | 1,023 | 57-for-105 | 54.2% | 10 : 13 | 52 |
| 6 | Charley O'Rourke | Chicago Bears | 951 | 37-for-88 | 42.0% | 11 : 16 | 68 |
| 7 | Parker Hall | Cleveland Rams | 815 | 62-for-140 | 44.3% | 7 : 19 | 59 |
| 8 | "Indian Jack" Jacobs | Cleveland Rams | 640 | 43-for-93 | 46.2% | 6 : 6 | 67 |
| 9 | Tuffy Leemans | New York Giants | 555 | 35-for-69 | 50.7% | 7 : 4 | 50 |
| 10 | Dean McAdams | Brooklyn Dodgers | 441 | 35-for-89 | 39.3% | 2 : 15 | 56 |
Sources: Strickler (ed.), 1943 NFL Roster and Record Manual, pp. 84-85.

== Awards ==
=== Joe F. Carr Trophy ===
The Joe F. Carr Trophy was presented annually by the National League as its Most Valuable Player award. For the second year in a row, the award was won by Packer end Don Hutson.

- Don Hutson, End, Green Bay Packers

=== All-National League Team ===
Given the dominant performance of the 1942 Chicago Bears team, it is unsurprising that five of the players named to the First Team eleven were members of George Halas' club, with a sixth Bear player tabbed for the second team. In addition, four Washington Redskins were accorded All-League honors, with the Green Bay Packers and the Cleveland Rams adding three players each. There were also 34 players included as part of an "Honorable Mention" list.

| First Team | | — | Second Team | |
| Name | Team | Position | Name | Team |
| Don Hutson | Green Bay Packers | LE | Perry Schwartz | Brooklyn Dodgers |
| Willie Wilkin | Washington Redskins | LT | Chet Adams | Cleveland Rams |
| Dan Fortmann | Chicago Bears | LG | Riley Matheson | Cleveland Rams |
| "Bulldog" Turner | Chicago Bears | C | Chuck Cherundolo | Pittsburgh Steelers |
| "Monk" Edwards | New York Giants | RG | Charles Goldenberg | Green Bay Packers |
| Lee Artoe | Chicago Bears | RT | "Bruiser" Kinard | Brooklyn Dodgers |
| Bob Masterson | Washington Redskins | RE | George Wilson | Chicago Bears |
| Sid Luckman | Chicago Bears | QB | Sammy Baugh | Washington Redskins |
| Cecil Isbell | Green Bay Packers | LHB | Merl Condit | Brooklyn Dodgers |
| Bill Dudley | Pittsburgh Steelers | RHB | Dante Magnani | Cleveland Rams |
| Gary Famiglietti | Chicago Bears | FB | Andy Farkas | Washington Redskins |
