= 1940 Washington Redskins season =

NFL team season

- Owner: George Preston Marshall
- General manager: Jack Espey
- Head coach: Ray Flaherty
- Home stadium: Griffith Stadium

Results
- Record: 9–2
- Division place: 1st NFL Eastern
- Playoffs: Lost NFL Championship (vs. Bears) 0–73

The 1940 Washington Redskins season was the franchise's 9th season in the National Football League (NFL) and their 4th in Washington, D.C. The team improved on their 6–3–2 record from 1939, finishing at 9–2. They would end the season losing the NFL Championship to the Chicago Bears, 73–0.

== Draft ==
1940 Washington Redskins draft
Round	Pick	Player	Position	College	Notes
1	8	Ed Boell	Back	NYU	
3	23	Buddy Banker	Back	Tulane	
5	38	Bill Kirchem	Tackle	Tulane	
6	48	Joe Boyd	Tackle	Texas A&M	
7	58	Roy Zimmerman *	Quarterback	San Jose State	
8	68	Bud Orf	End	Missouri	
9	78	Bob Hoffman	Back	USC	
10	88	Bob Seymour *	Halfback	Oklahoma	
11	98	Howard Stoecker	Tackle	USC	
12	108	Allen Johnson	Guard	Duke	
13	118	Sam Bartholomew	Fullback	Tennessee	
14	128	Ernie Lain	Back	Rice	
15	138	Sandy Sanford	End	Alabama	
16	148	Bolo Perdue	End	Arkansas	
17	158	Steve Andrako	Center	Ohio State	
18	168	Jay Graybeal	Back	Oregon	
19	178	Charley Slagle	Back	North Carolina	
20	188	Buck Murphy	Back	Georgia Tech	
21	193	Mel Wetzel	Tackle	Missouri	
22	198	Steve Sitko	Back	Notre Dame	
Made roster * Made at least one Pro Bowl during career

== Schedule ==
Game	Date	Opponent	Result	Record	Venue	Attendance	Recap	Sources
1	September 15	**Brooklyn Dodgers**	**W** 24–17	1–0	Griffith Stadium	32,763	Recap	
2	September 22	**New York Giants**	**W** 21–7	2–0	Griffith Stadium	34,712	Recap	
—	Bye							
3	October 6	at **Pittsburgh Steelers**	**W** 40–10	3–0	Forbes Field	25,213	Recap	
4	October 13	Chicago Cardinals	**W** 28–21	4–0	Griffith Stadium	33,691	Recap	
5	October 20	at **Philadelphia Eagles**	**W** 34–17	5–0	Shibe Park	26,083	Recap	
6	October 27	at Detroit Lions	**W** 20–14	6–0	University of Detroit Stadium	28,090	Recap	
7	November 3	**Pittsburgh Steelers**	**W** 37–10	7–0	Griffith Stadium	31,204	Recap	
8	November 10	at **Brooklyn Dodgers**	**L** 14–16	7–1	Ebbets Field	33,846	Recap	
9	November 17	Chicago Bears	**W** 7–3	8–1	Griffith Stadium	35,231	Recap	
10	November 24	at **New York Giants**	**L** 7–21	8–2	Polo Grounds	46,439	Recap	
11	December 1	**Philadelphia Eagles**	**W** 13–6	9–2	Griffith Stadium	25,838	Recap	
Note: Intra-division opponents are in **bold** text.

== Roster ==
1940 Washington Redskins final roster
Backs: 33 Sammy Baugh RB/CB/P; 44 Andy Farkas FB/LB; 30 Frank Filchock RB/CB; 42 Ray Hare RB/CB; 43 Bob Hoffman RB/S; 46 Don Irwin RB/CB; 31 Jimmy Johnston FB/LB; 13 Ed Justice RB/CB; 25 Max Krause RB/S; 49 Jim Meade RB/CB/P; 35 Wilbur Moore RB/CB/S; 12 Boyd Morgan RB/CB; 11 Erny Pinckert RB/S; 20 Bob Seymour FB/LB; 41 Dick Todd RB/CB/S; 22 Roy Zimmerman RB/CB/P	Linemen/Linebackers: 29 Steve Andrako C/LB; 15 Jim Barber T/DT; 26 Vic Carroll C/LB; 21 Dick Farman G/DG; 38 Bob Fisher G/DG; 27 Mickey Parks C/LB; 45 Bo Russell T/DT/K; 51 Clyde Shugart G/DG; 16 Steve Slivinski G/DG; 39 Clem Stralka G/DG; 18 Bob Titchenal C/LB; 36 Willie Wilkin T/DT	Ends/Receivers: 19 Charley Malone; 28 Bob Masterson K; 32 Bob McChesney; 40 Wayne Millner; 34 Sandy Sanford K; Reserve: 17 Turk Edwards T/DT (IR); 37 Bill Young G/DG (inactive); rookies in italics

== Standings ==
NFL Eastern Division
	W	L	T	PCT	DIV	PF	PA	STK
Washington Redskins	9	2	0	.818	6–2	245	142	W1
Brooklyn Dodgers	8	3	0	.727	6–2	186	120	W4
New York Giants	6	4	1	.600	5–2–1	131	133	L1
Pittsburgh Steelers	2	7	2	.222	1–6–1	60	178	L1
Philadelphia Eagles	1	10	0	.091	1–7	111	211	L1

Note: Tie games were not officially counted in the standings until 1972.

== Postseason ==
Round	Date	Opponent	Result	Venue	Attendance	Recap
Championship	December 8	Chicago Bears	L 0–73	Griffith Stadium	36,034	Recap
