= 1940 Pittsburgh Steelers season =

NFL team season

- Owner: Art Rooney
- Head coach: Walt Kiesling
- Home stadium: Forbes Field

Results
- Record: 2–7–2
- Division place: 4th NFL Eastern
- Playoffs: Did not qualify

The 1940 Pittsburgh Steelers season was the team's 8th in the National Football League. It was also the first season in which the team was known as the Pittsburgh Steelers, and not the copycat "Pirates" moniker. The 1940 team was led by head coach Walt Kiesling in his first full season as the head coach. Kiesling's assistant coaches were Wilbur "Bill" Sortet and Hank Bruder, who both also played.

== Offseason ==
They held training camp at St. Francis College in Loretto, Pennsylvania. In the 1940 NFL draft the Steelers continued their pattern of trading away high picks when they dealt their first-round selection (second overall), halfback Kay Eakin from Arkansas, to the New York Giants for tackle Ox Parry, who would never play for the Steelers.

== Regular season ==
=== Schedule ===
| Game | Date | Opponent | Result | Record | Venue | Attendance | Recap | Sources |
|---|---|---|---|---|---|---|---|---|
| 1 | September 8 | Chicago Cardinals | **T** 7–7 | 0–0–1 | Forbes Field | ~22,000 | Recap | |
| 2 | September 15 | **New York Giants** | **T** 10–10 | 0–0–2 | Forbes Field | 18,601 | Recap | |
| 3 | September 22 | at Detroit Lions | **W** 10–7 | 1–0–2 | University of Detroit Stadium | 15,310 | Recap | |
| 4 | September 29 | **Brooklyn Dodgers** | **L** 3–10 | 1–1–2 | Forbes Field | 26,618 | Recap | |
| 5 | October 6 | **Washington Redskins** | **L** 10–40 | 1–2–2 | Forbes Field | 25,213 | Recap | |
| 6 | October 13 | at **Brooklyn Dodgers** | **L** 0–21 | 1–3–2 | Ebbets Field | 19,468 | Recap | |
| 7 | October 20 | at **New York Giants** | **L** 0–12 | 1–4–2 | Polo Grounds | 19,798 | Recap | |
| 8 | October 27 | at Green Bay Packers | **L** 3–24 | 1–5–2 | Wisconsin State Fair Park | 13,703 | Recap | |
| 9 | November 3 | at **Washington Redskins** | **L** 10–37 | 1–6–2 | Griffith Stadium | 31,204 | Recap | |
| 10 | November 10 | **Philadelphia Eagles** | **W** 7–3 | 2–6–2 | Forbes Field | 9,556 | Recap | |
| 11 | November 28 | at **Philadelphia Eagles** | **L** 0–7 | 2–7–2 | Shibe Park | 4,200 | Recap | |
Note: Intra-division opponents are in **bold** text.

=== Game summaries ===
==== Week 1 (Sunday September 8, 1940): Chicago Cardinals ====
| | 1 | 2 | 3 | 4 | Total |
|---|---|---|---|---|---|
| Cardinals | 0 | 0 | 7 | 0 | **7** |
| Steelers | 0 | 7 | 0 | 0 | **7** |

at Forbes Field, Pittsburgh, Pennsylvania

- Game time:
- Game weather:
- Game attendance: 22,000
- Referee:

Scoring Drives:

- Pittsburgh – Platukis 45 pass from Patterson (Niccolai kick)
- Chicago Cardinals – Hall 44 pass from Clark (Clark kick)

==== Week 2 (Sunday, September 15, 1940): New York Giants ====
| | 1 | 2 | 3 | 4 | Total |
|---|---|---|---|---|---|
| Giants | 0 | 0 | 7 | 3 | **10** |
| Steelers | 10 | 0 | 0 | 0 | **10** |

at Forbes Field, Pittsburgh, Pennsylvania

- Game time:
- Game weather:
- Game attendance: 18,601
- Referee:

Scoring Drives:

- Pittsburgh – FG Niccolai 48
- Pittsburgh – Tomasetti 26 pass from Patterson (Niccolai kick)
- New York – Shaffer 1 run (Cuff kick)
- New York – FG Barnum 31

==== Week 3 (Sunday September 22, 1940): Detroit Lions ====
| | 1 | 2 | 3 | 4 | Total |
|---|---|---|---|---|---|
| **Steelers** | 0 | 0 | 3 | 7 | **10** |
| Lions | 0 | 7 | 0 | 0 | **7** |

at Briggs Stadium, Detroit, Michigan

- Game time:
- Game weather:
- Game attendance: 15,310
- Referee:

Scoring Drives:

- Detroit – Cardwell 33 run (White kick)
- Pittsburgh – FG Niccolai 28
- Pittsburgh – Tomasetti 3 run (Niccolai kick)

==== Week 4 (Sunday September 29, 1940): Brooklyn Dodgers ====
| | 1 | 2 | 3 | 4 | Total |
|---|---|---|---|---|---|
| **Dodgers** | 7 | 0 | 3 | 0 | **10** |
| Steelers | 0 | 3 | 0 | 0 | **3** |

at Forbes Field, Pittsburgh, Pennsylvania

- Game time:
- Game weather:
- Game attendance: 26,618
- Referee:

Scoring Drives:

- Brooklyn – Manders 1 run (Parker kick)
- Pittsburgh – FG Niccolai 21
- Brooklyn – FG Kercheval 27

==== Week 5 (Sunday October 6, 1940): Washington Redskins ====
| | 1 | 2 | 3 | 4 | Total |
|---|---|---|---|---|---|
| **Redskins** | 14 | 7 | 13 | 6 | **40** |
| Steelers | 3 | 0 | 7 | 0 | **10** |

at Forbes Field, Pittsburgh, Pennsylvania

- Game time:
- Game weather:
- Game attendance: 25,213
- Referee:

Scoring Drives:

- Pittsburgh – FG Niccolai 48
- Washington – Johnston 64 interception (kick failed)
- Washington – Seymour 1 run (Masterson kick)
- Washington – Millner 30 pass from Filchock (Russell kick)
- Washington – Johnston 1 run (Masterson kick)
- Washington – Johnston 2 run (Sanford kick)
- Pittsburgh – Condit pass from Thompson (Niccolai kick)
- Washington – Seymour 10 run (kick failed)

==== Week 6 (Sunday October 13, 1940): Brooklyn Dodgers ====
| | 1 | 2 | 3 | 4 | Total |
|---|---|---|---|---|---|
| Steelers | 0 | 0 | 0 | 0 | **0** |
| **Dodgers** | 14 | 0 | 0 | 7 | **21** |

at Ebbets Field, Brooklyn, New York

- Game time:
- Game weather:
- Game attendance: 19,468
- Referee:

Scoring Drives:

- Brooklyn – Manders 2 run (Parker kick)
- Brooklyn – Schwartz – 7 pass from Parker (Parker kick)
- Brooklyn – Leckonby 8 pass from Kercheval (Kercheval kick)

==== Week 7 (Sunday October 20, 1940): New York Giants ====
| | 1 | 2 | 3 | 4 | Total |
|---|---|---|---|---|---|
| Steelers | 0 | 0 | 0 | 0 | **0** |
| **Giants** | 7 | 3 | 0 | 2 | **12** |

at Polo Grounds, New York, New York

- Game time:
- Game weather:
- Game attendance: 19,798
- Referee:

Scoring Drives:

- New York – Cuff 60 pass from Miller (Cuff kick)
- New York – FG Cuff 23
- New York – Safety, Pirro tackled in end zone

==== Week 8 (Sunday October 27, 1940): Green Bay Packers ====
| | 1 | 2 | 3 | 4 | Total |
|---|---|---|---|---|---|
| Steelers | 3 | 0 | 0 | 0 | **3** |
| **Packers** | 7 | 3 | 0 | 14 | **24** |

at Wisconsin State Fair Park, Milwaukee, Wisconsin

- Game time:
- Game weather:
- Game attendance: 13,703
- Referee:

Scoring Drives:

- Green Bay – Adkins 35 interception (Engebretsen kick)
- Pittsburgh – FG Niccolai 36
- Green Bay – FG Hinkle 33
- Green Bay – Balazs 2 run (Hutson kick)
- Green Bay – Hutson 19 pass from Van Every (Engebretsen kick)

==== Week 9 (Sunday November 3, 1940): Washington Redskins ====
| | 1 | 2 | 3 | 4 | Total |
|---|---|---|---|---|---|
| Steelers | 3 | 7 | 0 | 0 | **10** |
| **Redskins** | 6 | 7 | 7 | 17 | **37** |

at Griffith Stadium, Washington, DC

- Game time:
- Game weather:
- Game attendance: 31,204
- Referee:

Scoring Drives:

- Pittsburgh – FG Niccolai 25
- Washington – Johnston 39 pass from Baugh (kick failed)
- Washington – Filchock 12 run (Russell kick)
- Pittsburgh – Platukis 31 pass from Patterson (Niccolai kick)
- Washington – Johnston 45 pass from Baugh (Masterson kick)
- Washington – Masterson 15 pass from Filchock (Russell kick)
- Washington – Todd 1 run (Russell kick)
- Washington – FG Masterson 20

==== Week 10 (Sunday November 10, 1940): Philadelphia Eagles ====
| | 1 | 2 | 3 | 4 | Total |
|---|---|---|---|---|---|
| Eagles | 3 | 0 | 0 | 0 | **3** |
| **Steelers** | 0 | 0 | 7 | 0 | **7** |

at Forbes Field, Pittsburgh, Pennsylvania

- Game time:
- Game weather:
- Game attendance: 9,556
- Referee:

Scoring Drives:

- Philadelphia – FG Sommers 36
- Pittsburgh – McDonough 1 run (Niccolai kick)

The Steelers defeated the Eagles 7–0. The game is the last in NFL history as of 2013 to not have a penalty called on either team.

==== Week 13 (Thursday November 28, 1940): Philadelphia Eagles ====
| | 1 | 2 | 3 | 4 | Total |
|---|---|---|---|---|---|
| Steelers | 0 | 0 | 0 | 0 | **0** |
| **Eagles** | 0 | 0 | 0 | 7 | **7** |

at Shibe Park, Philadelphia, Pennsylvania

- Game time:
- Game weather:
- Game attendance: 4,200
- Referee:

Scoring Drives:

- Philadelphia – Riffle 17 run (Somers kick)

== Roster ==
1940 Pittsburgh Steelers final roster
| Backs: 5 Hank Bruder RB/S; 10 Boyd Brumbaugh FB/LB/P; 1 Merl Condit RB/CB/P; 8 Ev Fisher RB/S; 6 Swede Johnston FB/LB/P; 9 George Kiick FB/LB; 25 Coley McDonough RB/CB; 50 John Noppenberg RB/S; 12 Billy Patterson RB/CB/P; 23 Rocco Pirro RB/CB; 3 Tommy Thompson RB/CB; 21 Lou Tomasetti RB/CB | Linemen/Linebackers: 29 Don Campbell T/DT; 28 Ted Doyle T/DT; 64 Clark Goff T/DT; 53 Ted Grabinski C/LB; 14 Joe Maras C/LB; 40 Carl Nery G/DG; 17 Armand Niccolai T/DT/K; 30 Stan Pavko G/DG; 39 John Perko G/DG; 55 Jack Sanders G/DG; 11 John Schmidt C/LB; 18 Frank Sullivan C/LB; 36 John Woudenberg T/DT | Ends/Receivers: 42 Sam Boyd; 45 Walt Kichefski; 22 John Klumb; 33 George Platukis; 20 Bill Sortet; Rookies in italics |

== Standings ==
NFL Eastern Division
| | W | L | T | PCT | DIV | PF | PA | STK |
|---|---|---|---|---|---|---|---|---|
| Washington Redskins | 9 | 2 | 0 | .818 | 6–2 | 245 | 142 | W1 |
| Brooklyn Dodgers | 8 | 3 | 0 | .727 | 6–2 | 186 | 120 | W4 |
| New York Giants | 6 | 4 | 1 | .600 | 5–2–1 | 131 | 133 | L1 |
| Pittsburgh Steelers | 2 | 7 | 2 | .222 | 1–6–1 | 60 | 178 | L1 |
| Philadelphia Eagles | 1 | 10 | 0 | .091 | 1–7 | 111 | 211 | L1 |

Note: Tie games were not officially counted in the standings until 1972.
