= 1940 Brooklyn Dodgers (NFL) season =

National Football League team season

1940 Brooklyn Dodgers season
- Owner: Dan Topping
- Head coach: Jock Sutherland
- Home stadium: Ebbets Field

Results
- Record: 8–3
- Division place: 2nd NFL Eastern
- Playoffs: Did not qualify

The 1940 Brooklyn Dodgers season marked their 11th year in the National Football League (NFL). The team improved on their previous season's output of 4–6–1, winning eight games. They failed to qualify for the playoffs for the ninth consecutive season.

== Schedule ==
| Game | Date | Opponent | Result | Record | Venue | Attendance | Recap | Sources |
|---|---|---|---|---|---|---|---|---|
| 1 | September 15 | at **Washington Redskins** | **L** 17–24 | 0–1 | Griffith Stadium | 32,763 | Recap | |
| — | Bye | | | | | | | |
| 2 | September 29 | at **Pittsburgh Steelers** | **W** 10–3 | 1–1 | Forbes Field | 26,618 | Recap | |
| 3 | October 4 | **Philadelphia Eagles** | **W** 30–17 | 2–1 | Ebbets Field | 24,008 | Recap | |
| 4 | October 13 | **Pittsburgh Steelers** | **W** 21–0 | 3–1 | Ebbets Field | 19,468 | Recap | |
| 5 | October 20 | at Chicago Bears | **L** 7–16 | 3–2 | Wrigley Field | 31,101 | Recap | |
| 6 | October 26 | at **Philadelphia Eagles** | **W** 21–7 | 4–2 | Shibe Park | 6,500 | Recap | |
| 7 | November 3 | **New York Giants** | **L** 7–10 | 4–3 | Ebbets Field | 32,958 | Recap | |
| 8 | November 10 | **Washington Redskins** | **W** 16–14 | 5–3 | Ebbets Field | 33,846 | Recap | |
| 9 | November 17 | Cleveland Rams | **W** 29–14 | 6–3 | Ebbets Field | 19,212 | Recap | |
| 10 | November 24 | Chicago Cardinals | **W** 14–9 | 7–3 | Ebbets Field | 16,619 | Recap | |
| 11 | December 1 | at **New York Giants** | **W** 14–6 | 8–3 | Polo Grounds | 54,993 | Recap | |
Note: Intra-division opponents are in **bold** text.

== Roster ==
1940 Brooklyn Dodgers final roster
| Backs: 66 Wendell Butcher RB/CB/S; 23 George Cafego RB/CB; 2 Dick Cassiano RB/CB; 10 Sam Francis RB/CB/P; 1 Ralph Kercheval RB/CB/K/P; 20 Ben Kish RB/S; 4 Bill Leckonby RB/CB; 9 Pug Manders FB/LB; 26 Banks McFadden RB/CB; 7 Ace Parker RB/CB/S/K/P; 30 Rhoten Shetley RB/S; 21 Frank Zadworney RB/CB; Ends/Receivers: 22 Bill Bailey; 16 Sherrill Busby; 14 Harold Hill; 13 Herman Hodges; 99 Perry Schwartz; 24 Bob Winslow; 6 Waddy Young | Linemen/Linebackers: 8 Ty Coon G/DG; 17 John Golemgeske T/DT; 3 Mike Gussie G/DG; 5 Red Heater T/DT; 27 Art Jocher G/DG; 25 Bruiser Kinard T/DT/K; 19 Frank Kristufek T/DT; 12 Lou Mark C/LB; 29 Walt Merrill T/DT; 31 Steve Petro G/DG; 28 Jim Sivell G/DG; 18 Bud Svendsen C/LB; 15 Si Titus C/LB; Rookies in italics |

== Standings ==
NFL Eastern Division
| | W | L | T | PCT | DIV | PF | PA | STK |
|---|---|---|---|---|---|---|---|---|
| Washington Redskins | 9 | 2 | 0 | .818 | 6–2 | 245 | 142 | W1 |
| Brooklyn Dodgers | 8 | 3 | 0 | .727 | 6–2 | 186 | 120 | W4 |
| New York Giants | 6 | 4 | 1 | .600 | 5–2–1 | 131 | 133 | L1 |
| Pittsburgh Steelers | 2 | 7 | 2 | .222 | 1–6–1 | 60 | 178 | L1 |
| Philadelphia Eagles | 1 | 10 | 0 | .091 | 1–7 | 111 | 211 | L1 |

Note: Tie games were not officially counted in the standings until 1972.
