= 1940 Philadelphia Eagles season =

NFL team season

- Owner: Bert Bell
- Head coach: Bert Bell
- Home stadium: Shibe Park

Results
- Record: 1–10
- Division place: 5th NFL Eastern
- Playoffs: Did not qualify

The 1940 Philadelphia Eagles season was their eighth in the National Football League (NFL). The team continued down the path of the 1939 Eagles, registering a second consecutive one-win season and languishing in the league's basement.

The Eagles 298 rushing yards in 1940 are the fewest in the history of the NFL. The team gained only 0.94 yards per carry.

== Off season ==
After 4 years playing at larger Philadelphia Municipal Stadium the Eagles move to Shibe Park for the 1940 season. The reason for the change was financial — stadium rent was set to go up $400 per game, an amount the struggling Eagles could ill-afford. In February, Eagles owner Bert Bell met with Connie Mack and hammered out an agreement for the team to play all six of their home games at Shibe — two in the afternoon and four under the lights at night.

Eagles training camp was held at West Chester State Teachers College, West Chester, Pennsylvania.

=== NFL draft ===
The 1940 NFL draft was held on December 9, 1939. This year again it was to have 22 rounds, with each team getting 20 picks. The weaker teams only picked in the 2nd and 4th rounds and were passed over in rounds 21 and 22.

The Eagles and Pittsburgh Pirates, before being called Steelers, both finished with 1–9–1, .100 records, but the 1939 Chicago Cardinals ended up at 1–10, .091 and would get the first pick in the draft. The Eagles and Pirates would alternate picking 2nd or 3rd in each round.

=== Player selections ===
The table shows the Eagles selections and what picks they had that were traded away and the team that ended up with that pick. It is possible the Eagles' pick ended up with this team via another team that the Eagles made a trade with. Not shown are acquired picks that the Eagles traded away.

Eighth round draft pick Don Looney led the NFL in receiving yards as a rookie in 1940. His career would be cut short by World War II.

= Pro Bowler	= Hall of Famer

Rd	Pick	Player	Position	School
1	2	George McAfee	Quarterback	Duke
2	13	John Schiechl	Center	Santa Clara
3	17	Dick Favor	Back	Oklahoma
4	28	Eberle Schultz	Guard	Oregon State
5	32	Frank Emmons	Back	Oregon
6	43	Saul Singer	Tackle	Arkansas
7	52	Hal Pegg	Center	Bucknell
8	63	Don Looney	End	Texas Christian
9	72	Don Jones	Back	Washington
10	83	Frank Maher	Back	Toledo
11	92	Elmer Hackney	Back	Kansas
12	103	Durward Horner	End	Texas Christian
13	112	Ted Hennis	Back	Purdue
14	123	Bill Bunsen	Back	Kansas
15	132	Don Crumbaker	End	Kansas State
16	143	J. R. Green	Tackle	Rice
17	152	Jim Molnar	Back	Bradley
18	163	Ernie Schwartzer	Guard	Boston College
19	172	Bill Schneller	Back	Mississippi
20	183	Bill Debord	Tackle	Kansas State

== Schedule ==
Game	Date	Opponent	Result	Record	Venue	Attendance	Recap	Sources
1	September 15	at Green Bay Packers	**L** 20–27	0–1	City Stadium	11,657	Recap	
2	September 22	at Cleveland Rams	**L** 13–21	0–2	Cleveland Stadium	15,941	Recap	
3	September 28	**New York Giants**	**L** 14–20	0–3	Shibe Park	26,431	Recap	
4	October 4	at **Brooklyn Dodgers**	**L** 17–30	0–4	Ebbets Field	24,008	Recap	
5	October 13	at **New York Giants**	**L** 7–17	0–5	Polo Grounds	30,317	Recap	
6	October 20	**Washington Redskins**	**L** 17–34	0–6	Shibe Park	25,062	Recap	
7	October 26	**Brooklyn Dodgers**	**L** 7–21	0–7	Shibe Park	~6,500	Recap	
8	November 10	at **Pittsburgh Steelers**	**L** 3–7	0–8	Forbes Field	9,556	Recap	
9	November 17	Detroit Lions	**L** 0–21	0–9	Shibe Park	6,327	Recap	
10	November 28	**Pittsburgh Steelers**	**W** 7–0	1–9	Shibe Park	4,200	Recap	
11	December 1	at **Washington Redskins**	**L** 6–13	1–10	Griffith Stadium	25,838	Recap	
Note: Intra-division opponents are in **bold** text.

== Standings ==
NFL Eastern Division
	W	L	T	PCT	DIV	PF	PA	STK
Washington Redskins	9	2	0	.818	6–2	245	142	W1
Brooklyn Dodgers	8	3	0	.727	6–2	186	120	W4
New York Giants	6	4	1	.600	5–2–1	131	133	L1
Pittsburgh Steelers	2	7	2	.222	1–6–1	60	178	L1
Philadelphia Eagles	1	10	0	.091	1–7	111	211	L1

Note: Tie games were not officially counted in the standings until 1972.

== Game recaps ==
A recap of the scoring plays and the game scores by quarters during the year. The record after the team's name reflects this games outcome also.

=== Game 1: at Green Bay Packers ===
Sunday September 15, 1940

	1	2	3	4	Final
Philadelphia Eagles (0–1)	0	6	0	14	20
Green Bay Packers (1–0)	21	0	6	0	27

		SCORING PLAYS	PHIL	GB	TIME
1st	Packers	Packers Cecil Isbell 39-yard rush (Don Hutson kick)	0	7	
	Packers	Carl Mulleneaux 6-yard pass from Cecil Isbell (Don Hutson kick)	0	14	
	Packers	Carl Mulleneaux 7 yard pass from Cecil Isbell (Tiny Engebretsen kick)	0	21	
2nd	Eagles	Dick Riffle 8-yard pass from Davey O'Brien (kick failed)	6	21	
3rd	Packers	Clarke Hinkle 45-yard field goal	6	24	
	Packers	Clarke Hinkle 45-yard field goal	6	27	
4th	Eagles	Don Looney 31-yard interception return (John Cole kick)	13	27	
	Eagles	Don Looney 32 yard pass from Davey O'Brien (John Cole kick)	20	27	

=== Game 2: at Cleveland Rams ===
Sunday September 22, 1940

	1	2	3	4	Total
Philadelphia Eagles (0–2–0)	0	7	0	6	13
Cleveland Rams (1–0–0)	13	6	0	2	21

Scoring

1st Quarter Scoring Plays

- Rams – Johnny Drake 2-yard rush (kick failed) 0-6
- Rams – Johnny Drake unknown yard rush (Pete Gudauskas kick) 0-13

2nd Quarter Scoring Plays

- Eagles – Don Looney 10-yard pass from Davey O'Brien (John Cole kick) 7-13
- Rams – Johnny Drake 8-yard rush (kick failed) 7-19

3rd Quarter Scoring Plays

- None

4th Quarter Scoring Plays

- Eagles – Don Looney 23-yard pass from Foster Watkins (kick failed) 13-19
- Rams – Safety, OBrien tackled in end zone 13-21

=== Game 3: New York Giants ===
Quarterback Davey O'Brien was featured on the program cover for the September 28 game against the Giants.

Saturday September 28, 1940

	1	2	3	4	Total
New York Giants (1–1–1)	10	3	7	0	20
Philadelphia Eagles (0–3–0)	7	0	7	0	14

Scoring

1st Quarter Scoring Plays

- Eagles – Joe Bukant 1-yard rush (Fran Murray kick)
- Giants – Ward Cuff 37-yard field goal
- Giants – Ward Cuff 42-yard rush (Ward Cuff kick)

2nd Quarter Scoring Plays

- Giants – Ward Cuff 30-yard field goal

3rd Quarter Scoring Plays

- Giants – Jim Poole 38-yard pass from Eddie Miller (Ward Cuff kick)
- Eagles – Dick Riffle 2-yard rush (Fran Murray kick)

4th Quarter Scoring Plays NONE

=== Game 4: at Brooklyn Dodgers ===
Friday, October 4, 1940

	1	2	3	4	Total
Philadelphia Eagles (0–4–0)	7	7	0	7	21
Brooklyn Dodgers (2–1–0)	17	0	13	0	30

Scoring 1st Quarter Scoring Plays

- Eagles – John Cole 45-yard field goal

2nd Quarter Scoring Plays

- Dodgers – Perry Schwartz unknown yard pass from Ace Parker (Ace Parker kick)
- Dodgers Art Jocher 2-yard pass from Dick Cassiano (Ralph Kercheval kick)
- Dodgers Ralph Kercheval 24-yard field goal

3rd Quarter Scoring Plays

- NONE

Eagles Elmer Hackney 1-yard rush (Fran Murray kick) 4th Quarter Scoring Plays

- Eagles Davey O'Brien 10-yard rush (Fran Murray kick)
- Dodgers Pug Manders 1-yard rush (kick failed)
- Dodgers Ace Parker 2-yard rush (Ace Parker kick)

=== Game 5: at New York Giants ===
Sunday, October 13, 1940

	1	2	3	4	Total
Philadelphia Eagles (0–5–0)	0	0	0	7	7
New York Giants (2–1–1)	0	0	10	7	17

Scoring 1st and 2nd Quarter Scoring Plays

- NONE

3rd Quarter Scoring Plays

- Giants – Eddie Miller 25-yard rush (Ward Cuff kick)
- Giants – Ward Cuff 35-yard field goal

4th Quarter Scoring Plays

- Giants – Lee Shaffer 6-yard pass from Tuffy Leemans (Len Barnum kick)
- Eagles – Frank Emmons 1-yard rush (Foster Watkins kick)

=== Game 6: Washington Redskins ===
Sunday, October 20, 1940

	1	2	3	4	Total
Washington Redskins (5–0–0)	7	14	6	7	34
Philadelphia Eagles (0–6–0)	3	14	0	0	17

Scoring

1st Quarter Scoring Plays

- Eagles George Somers 46-yard field goal
- Redskins Wayne Millner 41-yard pass from Sammy Baugh (Bob Masterson kick)

2nd Quarter Scoring Plays

- Eagles Dick Riffle 1-yard rush (Fran Murray kick)
- Eagles Don Looney 47-yard pass from Davey O'Brien (Fran Murray kick)
- Redskins Bob Masterson 52-yard pass from Sammy Baugh (Bob Masterson kick)
- Redskins Dick Todd 29-yard pass from Sammy Baugh (Bob Masterson kick)

3rd Quarter Scoring Plays

- Redskins Bob Seymour 5-yard rush (kick failed)

4th Quarter Scoring Plays

- Redskins Dick Todd 2-yard rush (Bob Masterson kick)

=== Game 7: Brooklyn Dodgers ===
Saturday, October 26, 1940

	1	2	3	4	Total
Brooklyn Dodgers (4–2–0)	7	0	7	7	21
Philadelphia Eagles (0–7–0)	0	0	0	7	7

Scoring

1st Quarter Scoring Plays

- Dodgers – Banks McFadden 75-yard rush (Ace Parker kick) 7 0

2nd Quarter Scoring Plays

- NONE

3rd Quarter Scoring Plays

- Dodgers – Pug Manders 2-yard rush (Ace Parker kick) 14 0

4th Quarter Scoring Plays

- Eagles – Dick Riffle 4-yard rush (Foster Watkins kick) 14 7
- Dodgers – Bill Leckonby 98-yard kickoff return (Ralph Kercheval kick) 21 7

=== Game 8: at Pittsburgh Steelers ===
Sunday, November 10, 1940

This was the final game in NFL history as of 2013 in which neither team was penalized.

	1	2	3	4	Total
Philadelphia Eagles (0–8–0)	3	0	0	0	3
Pittsburgh Steelers (2–6–2)	0	0	7	0	7

Scoring

1st Quarter Scoring Plays

- Eagles – George Somers 36-yard field goal 3 0

3rd Quarter Scoring Plays

- Steelers – Coley McDonough 1-yard rush (Armand Niccolai kick)

=== Game 9: Detroit Lions ===
Sunday, November 17, 1940

	1	2	3	4	Total
Detroit Lions (5–4–1)	0	7	0	17	21
Philadelphia Eagles (0–9–0)	0	0	0	0	0

Scoring

1st Quarter Scoring Plays

- Lions – Lloyd Cardwell 30-yard rush (Chuck Hanneman kick)

3rd Quarter Scoring Plays

- Lions – Whizzer White 7-yard rush (Chuck Hanneman kick)
- Lions – Whizzer White 5-yard rush (Chuck Hanneman kick)

=== Game 10: Pittsburgh Steelers ===
Thursday November 28, 1940 – Thanksgiving Day

	1	2	3	4	Final
Pittsburgh Steelers (2–7–2)	0	0	0	0	0
Philadelphia Eagles (1–9–0)	0	0	0	7	7

		SCORING PLAYS	PITT	PHIL	TIME
4th	Eagles	Eagles Dick Riffle 17-yard rush (George Somers kick)	0	7	

=== Game 11: at Washington Redskins ===
Sunday, December 1, 1940

This was the Eagles 2nd game in 3 days.

	1	2	3	4	Total
Philadelphia Eagles (1–10–0)	0	0	0	6	6
Washington Redskins (9–2–0)	0	6	7	0	13

Scoring 1st Quarter Scoring Plays

- NONE

2nd Quarter Scoring Plays

- Redskins – Wilbur Moore 23-yard rush (kick failed)

3rd Quarter Scoring Plays

- Redskins – Dick Todd 6-yard rush (Bob Masterson kick)

4th Quarter Scoring Plays

- Eagles – Frank Emmons 19-yard pass from Davey O'Brien (kick failed)

== Playoffs ==
The Eagles with a 1–10–1 record finished last in the NFL Eastern Division and fail to make it to the 1940 NFL Championship Game. The game was played at Griffith Stadium in Washington, D.C., on December 8, 1940. The Chicago Bears, with an 8–3 record, defeated the Washington Redskins, with a 9–2 record, 73–0, the most one-sided victory in NFL history. The Bears scored on 3 interception returns of Washington passes during the game. This was the first NFL title game that was broadcast nationwide on radio by Mutual Broadcasting System.

== Roster ==
(All time List of Philadelphia Eagles players in franchise history)

= 1940 Pro Bowl Pro All-Star	= Hall of Famer

NO.	Player	AGE	POS	GP	GS	WT	HT	YRS	College
	Bert Bell	45	Coach	_{1940 record} 1–10	_{NFL-Eagles Lifetime} 10–44–2			5th _{last}	Pennsylvania
	Jay Arnold	28	HB-WB-DB; BB-KR-PR	9	3	210	6–1	3	Texas
	Dick Bassi *	25	G	11	9	214	5–11	2	Santa Clara
	Joe Bukant	25	B	11	4	216	6–0	2	Washington (MO)
	Joe Carter	30	E	6	4	201	6–1	7	_{Austin College and SMU}
	Chuck Cherundolo	24	C-LB	11	5	215	6–1	3	Penn State
	John Cole	?	FB	7	1	197	5–9	2	St. Joseph's (PA)
	Woody Dow	24	BB-FB	11	0	195	6–0	2	West Texas A&M
	Frank Emmons	22	B	11	5	213	6–1	Rookie	Oregon
	Ray George	22	T	2	2	229	6–0	1	USC
	Jerry Ginney	24	G	1	0	217	5–11	Rookie	Santa Clara
	Elmer Hackney	24	FB	8	1	205	6–2	Rookie	Kansas State
	Maurice Harper	30	C	9	6	227	6–4	3	Austin
	Bill Hughes	25	G-C	7	6	226	6–1	3	Texas
	Elmer Kolberg	24	HB-E	10	5	201	6–4	1	Oregon State
	Don Looney *	23	E	11	8	182	6–2	Rookie	TCU
	Les McDonald	26	E	9	0	200	6–4	3	Nebraska
	Fran Murray	25	B	11	6	200	6–0	1	Pennsylvania
	Charles Newton	24	FB-HB	3	2	204	6–0	1	Washington
	Davey O'Brien	23	QB-TB	11	11	151	5–7	1	TCU
	Phil Ragazzo	25	T-G	6	5	216	6–0	2	Case Western Reserve
	Red Ramsey	29	E	11	8	196	6–0	2	Texas Tech
	Dick Riffle	25	B	11	6	200	6–1	2	Albright
	Theodore Schmitt	24	G	11	2	219	5–11	2	Pittsburgh
	Elbie Schultz	23	T-G	11	3	252	6–4	Rookie	Oregon State
	George Somers	25	T	10	7	253	6–2	1	La Salle
	Russ Thompson	28	T	11	5	249	6–5	4	Nebraska
	Milt Trost	27	T-E	7	2	206	6–1	5	Marquette
	Foster Watkins	23	QB-HB	9	0	163	5–9	Rookie	West Texas A&M
	Joe Wendlick	25	E	9	2	213	6–0	Rookie	Oregon State
	Clem Woltman	26	T	10	3	214	6–1	2	Purdue
	30 Players; Team Average	24.3		11		209.5	6–0.7	1.8	

== Postseason ==
In the off season Davey O'Brien turned down a salary raise and retired from the NFL.

In December 1940, Pittsburgh Steelers owner Art Rooney sold the Steelers to Alexis Thompson and used half of the proceeds to buy a half interest in the Philadelphia Eagles from his friend Bert Bell. Before the start of the 1941 season Rooney, Bell, and Thompson swapped city and NFL rights for Philadelphia and Pittsburgh. The Pittsburgh Steelers players of 1940 and before thereby became Philadelphia Eagles and the Philadelphia Eagles players of 1940 and before likewise became members of the Pittsburgh Steelers – with the exception of several players who were traded between the two teams.

== Award and honors ==
- Davey O'Brien leads league with 227 pass attempts
- Davey O'Brien leads league with 124 pass completions
- Davey O'Brien finishes 2nd in league with 1227 passing yards
- Don Looney leads league in passes caught with 58
- Don Looney leads league in passing yards with 707 yards
- Dick Bassi makes Pro All-Star team as a left guard
- Don Looney makes Pro All-Star team as an end
