= 1940 New York Giants season =

NFL team 16th season

- Head coach: Steve Owen
- Home stadium: Polo Grounds

Results
- Record: 6–4–1
- Division place: 3rd NFL Eastern
- Playoffs: Did not qualify

The 1940 New York Giants season marked the franchise's 16th year in the National Football League (NFL).

== Schedule ==
Game	Date	Opponent	Result	Record	Venue	Attendance	Recap	Sources
1	September 15	at **Pittsburgh Steelers**	**T** 10–10	0–0–1	Forbes Field	18,601	Recap	
2	September 22	at **Washington Redskins**	**L** 7–21	0–1–1	Griffith Stadium	34,712	Recap	
3	September 28	at **Philadelphia Eagles**	**W** 20–14	1–1–1	Shibe Park	26,431	Recap	
—	Bye							
4	October 13	**Philadelphia Eagles**	**W** 17–7	2–1–1	Polo Grounds	30,317	Recap	
5	October 20	**Pittsburgh Steelers**	**W** 12–0	3–1–1	Polo Grounds	19,798	Recap	
6	October 27	Chicago Bears	**L** 21–37	3–2–1	Polo Grounds	44,219	Recap	
7	November 3	at **Brooklyn Dodgers**	**W** 10–7	4–2–1	Ebbets Field	32,958	Recap	
8	November 10	Cleveland Rams	**L** 0–13	4–3–1	Polo Grounds	23,614	Recap	
9	November 17	Green Bay Packers	**W** 7–3	5–3–1	Polo Grounds	28,262	Recap	
10	November 24	**Washington Redskins**	**W** 21–7	6–3–1	Polo Grounds	46,439	Recap	
11	December 1	**Brooklyn Dodgers**	**L** 6–14	6–4–1	Polo Grounds	54,993	Recap	
Note: Intra-division opponents are in **bold** text.

== Roster ==
1940 New York Giants final roster
Backs: 10 Len Barnum RB/CB/K/P; 14 Ward Cuff RB/CB/K; 12 Kay Eakin RB/S/P; 28 Nello Falaschi FB/LB; 6 Jack Hinkle RB/CB; 4 Tuffy Leemans RB/CB; 17 John McLaughry RB/CB; 9 Eddie Miller RB/S/P; 8 Walt Nielsen FB/LB; 25 Dom Principe RB/CB; 20 Leland Shaffer RB/CB/S; 15 Hank Soar RB/CB	Linemen/Linebackers: 55 Pete Cole G/DG; 36 Frank Cope T/DT; 2 Johnny Dell Isola G/DG; 66 Jerry Dennerlein T/DT; 69 Gil Duggan T/DT; 60 Monk Edwards T/DT; 7 Mel Hein C/LB; 5 Kayo Lunday C/LB; 33 John Mellus T/DT; 35 Ken Moore G/DG; 39 Doug Oldershaw G/DG; 42 Orville Tuttle G/DG; 50 Ed Widseth T/DT	Ends/Receivers: 29 Chuck Gelatka; 31 Max Harrison; 21 Jim Lee Howell; 27 Jiggs Kline; 24 Bolo Perdue; 23 Buster Poole; rookies in italics

== Standings ==
Game program for the November 24 match-up with the Washington Redskins.

NFL Eastern Division
	W	L	T	PCT	DIV	PF	PA	STK
Washington Redskins	9	2	0	.818	6–2	245	142	W1
Brooklyn Dodgers	8	3	0	.727	6–2	186	120	W4
New York Giants	6	4	1	.600	5–2–1	131	133	L1
Pittsburgh Steelers	2	7	2	.222	1–6–1	60	178	L1
Philadelphia Eagles	1	10	0	.091	1–7	111	211	L1

Note: Tie games were not officially counted in the standings until 1972.

== See also ==
- List of New York Giants seasons
