= Krištůfek =

Krištůfek, Kristufek is a Czech surname. Notable people with the surname include:

- Frank Kristufek (1915–1998), American football player
- Petr Krištůfek (born 1971), Czech footballer
- Petra Krištúfková (born 1977), Slovak politician
