= 1940 NFL draft =

National Football League draft

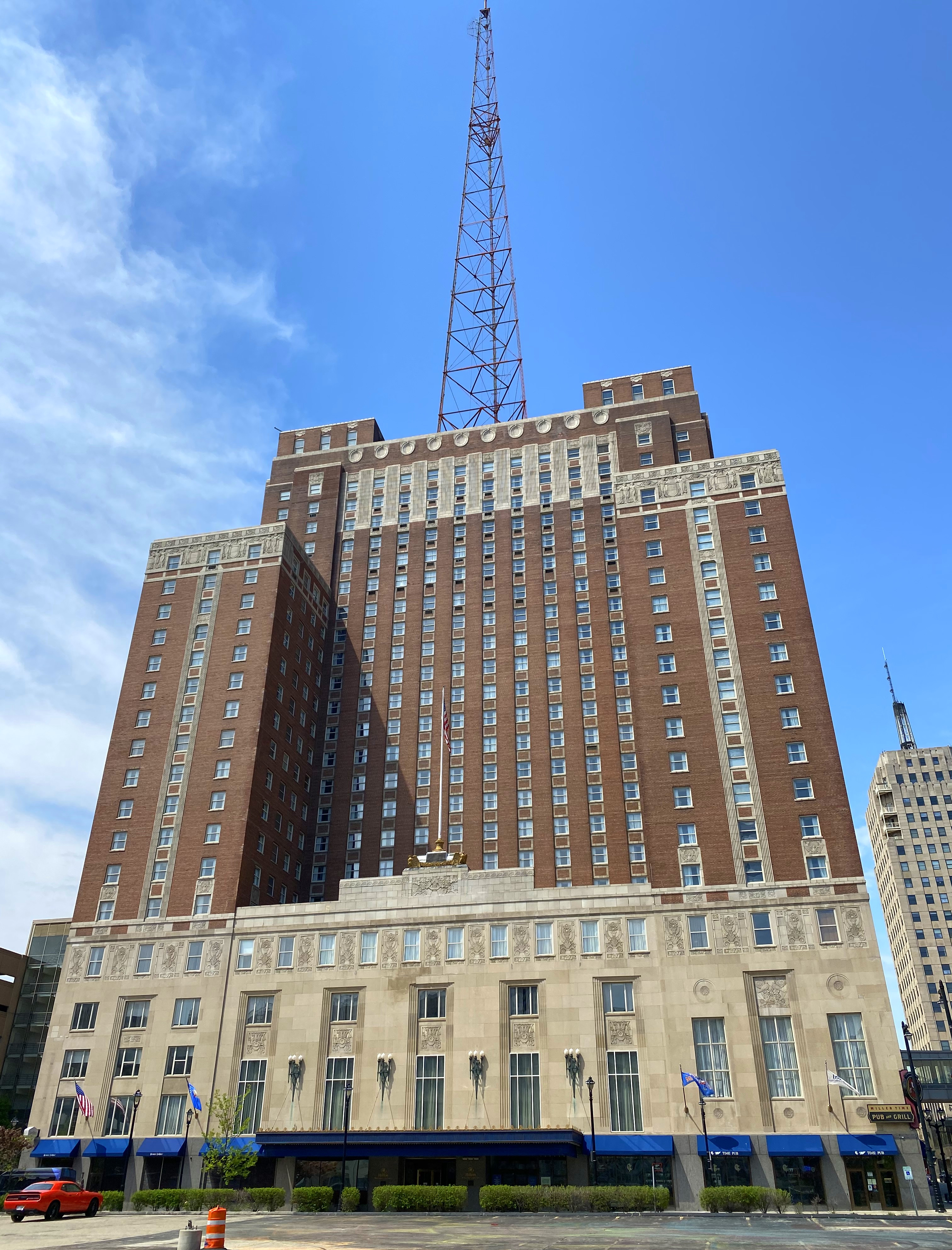
- Hilton Milwaukee (the former Schroeder Hotel, location of the draft) photographed in 2021

General information
- Date: December 9, 1939
- Location: Schroeder Hotel in Milwaukee, WI

Overview
- 200 total selections in 22 rounds
- League: NFL
- First selection: George Cafego, TB; Chicago Cardinals
- Most selections (20): each team made 20 picks
- Fewest selections (20): each team made 20 picks
- Hall of Famers: 2: QB George McAfee; C Bulldog Turner

The 1940 NFL draft was held on December 9, 1939, at the Schroeder Hotel in Milwaukee, Wisconsin. With the first overall pick of the draft, the Chicago Cardinals selected George Cafego.

== Location ==
The draft was held in the Empire Room of the Schroeder Hotel in Milwaukee, Wisconsin. In the early history of the NFL, drafts were typically held on the eve of the NFL Championship Game. The 1939 NFL Championship Game (held the day after the draft) was hosted by the Green Bay Packers, but took place in Milwaukee (at the "Dairy Bowl" stadium in the infield of the Milwaukee Mile racetrack) instead of the Green Bay, Wisconsin due to team owner Curly Lambeau's belief that a game in Milwaukee (a larger city more accessible by rail) would generate greater attendance than one in Green Bay. Lambeau's decision paid off, with a sold-out game the day following the draft.

Both the hotel (today known as the "Hilton Milwaukee") and the ballroom in which the draft was held remain today, with the ballroom maintaining a similar appearance to how it looked at the time of the draft.

== Player selections ==
‡	= Hall of Famer (Note: Players are identified as a Hall of Famer if they have been inducted into the Pro Football Hall of Fame.)
†	= Pro Bowler (Note: Players are identified as a Pro Bowler if they were selected for the Pro Bowl at any time in their career.)

Rnd.	Pick	Team	Player	Pos.	College	Notes
1	1	Chicago Cardinals	George Cafego	FB	Tennessee	
1	2	Philadelphia Eagles	George McAfee^{‡}	QB	Duke	
1	3	Pittsburgh Steelers	Kay Eakin	HB	Arkansas	
1	4	Brooklyn Dodgers	Banks McFadden	HB	Clemson	
1	5	Cleveland Rams	Olie Cordill ^{†}	HB	Rice	
1	6	Detroit Lions	Doyle Nave	QB	USC	
1	7	Chicago Bears	Bulldog Turner^{‡}	C	Hardin–Simmons	
1	8	Washington Redskins	Ed Boell	QB	NYU	
1	9	Green Bay Packers	Hal Van Every	HB	Minnesota	
1	10	New York Giants	Grenny Lansdell	HB	USC	
2	11	Chicago Cardinals	Snuffy Stirnweiss	B	North Carolina	
2	12	Pittsburgh Steelers	Ralph Wenzell	E	Tulane	
2	13	Philadelphia Eagles	John Schiechl	C	Santa Clara	
2	14	Brooklyn Dodgers	Nile Kinnick	B	Iowa	
2	15	Cleveland Rams	Merl Condit ^{†}	B	Carnegie Tech	
3	16	Chicago Cardinals	Lloyd Madden	B	Colorado Mines	
3	17	Philadelphia Eagles	Dick Favor	B	Oklahoma	
3	18	Pittsburgh Steelers	George Kiick	B	Bucknell	
3	19	Brooklyn Dodgers	Rhoten Shetley	B	Furman	
3	20	Cleveland Rams	Jack Haman	C	Northwestern	
3	21	Detroit Lions	Bill Fisk	E	USC	
3	22	Chicago Bears	Ken Kavanaugh ^{†}	E	LSU	
3	23	Washington Redskins	Buddy Banker	B	Tulane	
3	24	Green Bay Packers	Lou Brock	B	Purdue	
3	25	New York Giants	John McLaughry	B	Brown	
4	26	Chicago Cardinals	John Shirk ^{†}	E	Oklahoma	
4	27	Pittsburgh Steelers	Pop Ivy ^{†}	E	Oklahoma	
4	28	Philadelphia Eagles	Eberle Schultz	G	Oregon State	
4	29	Brooklyn Dodgers	Bill Bailey	E	Duke	
4	30	Cleveland Rams	Bobby Wood	T	Alabama	
5	31	Chicago Cardinals	Marty Christiansen	B	Minnesota	
5	32	Philadelphia Eagles	Frank Emmons	B	Oregon	
5	33	Pittsburgh Steelers	Clark Goff	T	Florida	
5	34	Brooklyn Dodgers	Walt Merrill	T	Alabama	
5	35	Cleveland Rams	Park Myers	T	Texas	
5	36	Detroit Lions	Harry Smith ^{†}	G	USC	
5	37	Chicago Bears	Ed Kolman ^{†}	T	Temple	
5	38	Washington Redskins	Bill Kirchem	T	Tulane	
5	39	Green Bay Packers	Esco Sarkkinen	E	Ohio State	
5	40	New York Giants	Carl Tomasello	E	Scranton	
6	41	Chicago Cardinals	Vic Reginato	E	Oregon	
6	42	Pittsburgh Steelers	Frank Bykowski	G	Purdue	
6	43	Philadelphia Eagles	Saul Singer	T	Arkansas	
6	44	Brooklyn Dodgers	Jack Murray	C	Wisconsin	
6	45	Cleveland Rams	Ken Heineman	B	Texas Mines	
6	46	Detroit Lions	Jim Rike	C	Tennessee	
6	47	Chicago Bears	John Woudenberg ^{†}	T	Denver	
6	48	Washington Redskins	Joe Boyd	T	Texas A&M	
6	49	Green Bay Packers	Dick Cassiano	B	Pittsburgh	
6	50	New York Giants	Lou Smith	B	California	
7	51	Chicago Cardinals	Andy Chisick	C	Villanova	
7	52	Philadelphia Eagles	Hal Pegg	C	Bucknell	
7	53	Pittsburgh Steelers	Pete Cignetti	B	Boston College	
7	54	Brooklyn Dodgers	Ty Coon	T	NC State	
7	55	Cleveland Rams	Bob Nowaskey ^{†}	E	George Washington	
7	56	Detroit Lions	Bob Winslow	E	USC	
7	57	Chicago Bears	Len Akin	G	Baylor	
7	58	Washington Redskins	Roy Zimmerman ^{†}	B	San Jose State	
7	59	Green Bay Packers	Millard White	T	Tulane	
7	60	New York Giants	Rex Williams	C	Texas Tech	
8	61	Chicago Cardinals	Ben Kish	B	Pittsburgh	
8	62	Pittsburgh Steelers	Carl Nery	G	Duquesne	
8	63	Philadelphia Eagles	Don Looney ^{†}	E	TCU	
8	64	Brooklyn Dodgers	Frank Zadworney	B	Ohio State	
8	65	Cleveland Rams	Bill Anahu	E	Santa Clara	
8	66	Detroit Lions	Bill Tranavitch	B	Rutgers	
8	67	Chicago Bears	Jim Fordham	B	Georgia	
8	68	Washington Redskins	Bud Orf	E	Missouri	
8	69	Green Bay Packers	George Seeman	E	Nebraska	
8	70	New York Giants	Win Pedersen	T	Minnesota	
9	71	Chicago Cardinals	Luke Pappas	T	Utah	
9	72	Philadelphia Eagles	Don Jones	B	Washington	
9	73	Pittsburgh Steelers	Dick Boisseau	T	Washington & Lee	
9	74	Brooklyn Dodgers	Art Jocher	T	Manhattan	
9	75	Cleveland Rams	Wilfred Thorpe	G	Arkansas	
9	76	Detroit Lions	Bob Haas	T	Missouri	
9	77	Chicago Bears	Hampton Pool ^{†}	E	Stanford	
9	78	Washington Redskins	Bob Hoffman	B	USC	
9	79	Green Bay Packers	J. R. Manley	G	Oklahoma	
9	80	New York Giants	Dom Principe	B	Fordham	
10	81	Chicago Cardinals	Jack Roche	B	Santa Clara	
10	82	Pittsburgh Steelers	Paul Shu	B	VMI	
10	83	Philadelphia Eagles	Frank Maher	B	Toledo	
10	84	Brooklyn Dodgers	Jim Turner	G	Holy Cross	
10	85	Cleveland Rams	Herb Smith	B	Saint Mary's (CA)	
10	86	Detroit Lions	Leon DeWitte	B	Purdue	
10	87	Chicago Bears	Tom Pace	B	Utah	
10	88	Washington Redskins	Bob Seymour ^{†}	B	Oklahoma	
10	89	Green Bay Packers	Jack Brown	B	Purdue	
10	90	New York Giants	Earl Clark	B	TCU	
11	91	Chicago Cardinals	Bill Davis	T	Texas Tech	
11	92	Philadelphia Eagles	Elmer Hackney	B	Kansas State	
11	93	Pittsburgh Steelers	Cary Cox	C	Alabama	
11	94	Brooklyn Dodgers	Nick Cutlich	T	Northwestern	
11	95	Cleveland Rams	Boyd Clay	T	Tennessee	
11	96	Detroit Lions	Erwin Prasse	E	Iowa	
11	97	Chicago Bears	Lee Artoe ^{†}	T	California	
11	98	Washington Redskins	Howard Stoecker	T	USC	
11	99	Green Bay Packers	Don Guritz	G	Northwestern	
11	100	New York Giants	John McKibben	E	Tulsa	
12	101	Chicago Cardinals	Stan Andersen	T	Stanford	
12	102	Pittsburgh Steelers	Rocco Pirro	B	Catholic University	
12	103	Philadelphia Eagles	Durward Horner	E	TCU	
12	104	Brooklyn Dodgers	George Dougherty	B		Sources say Howard but the first African American was drafted in 1949.
12	105	Cleveland Rams	Shag Goolsby	C	Mississippi State	
12	106	Detroit Lions	Ken Binder	B	Carroll (WI)	
12	107	Chicago Bears	Bill McCubbin	E	Kentucky	
12	108	Washington Redskins	Allen Johnson	G	Duke	
12	109	Green Bay Packers	Phil Gaspar	T	USC	
12	110	New York Giants	Ed McGee	G	Temple	
13	111	Chicago Cardinals	Alton Coppage	E	Oklahoma	
13	112	Philadelphia Eagles	Ted Hennis	B	Purdue	
13	113	Pittsburgh Steelers	John Noppenberg	B	Miami (FL)	
13	114	Brooklyn Dodgers	Mike Gussie	G	West Virginia	
13	115	Cleveland Rams	Jack Gregory	T	Chattanooga	
13	116	Detroit Lions	Justin Bowers	T	Oklahoma	
13	117	Chicago Bears	Harry Clarke ^{†}	B	West Virginia	
13	118	Washington Redskins	Sam Bartholomew	B	Tennessee	
13	119	Green Bay Packers	Ambrose Schindler	B	USC	
13	120	New York Giants	Joe Payne	G	Clemson	
14	121	Chicago Cardinals	Judson Hudson	B	Davis & Elkins	
14	122	Pittsburgh Steelers	Nick Stublar	T	Santa Clara	
14	123	Philadelphia Eagles	Bill Bunsen	B	Kansas	
14	124	Brooklyn Dodgers	Len Coffman	B	Tennessee	
14	125	Cleveland Rams	Pete Bogden	E	Utah	
14	126	Detroit Lions	Jack Morlock	B	Marshall	
14	127	Chicago Bears	Frank Crisci	T		Case Western Reserve
14	128	Washington Redskins	Ernie Lain	B	Rice	
14	129	Green Bay Packers	Bill Kerr	E	Notre Dame	
14	130	New York Giants	Bob Smith	B	Oregon	
15	131	Chicago Cardinals	Joe Ziemba	E	St. Benedict's (KS)	
15	132	Philadelphia Eagles	Don Crumbaker	E	Kansas State	
15	133	Pittsburgh Steelers	Ray McCarthy	B	Santa Clara	
15	134	Brooklyn Dodgers	Jim Conlin	C	NYU	
15	135	Cleveland Rams	Owen Goodnight	B	Hardin–Simmons	
15	136	Detroit Lions	Stillman Rouse	E	Missouri	
15	137	Chicago Bears	Sherm Barnes	E	Baylor	
15	138	Washington Redskins	Sandy Sanford	E	Alabama	
15	139	Green Bay Packers	Mel Brewer	G	Illinois	
15	140	New York Giants	Othel Turner	T	Tulsa	
16	141	Chicago Cardinals	Beryl Clark	B	Oklahoma	
16	142	Pittsburgh Steelers	Leon Gajecki	C	Penn State	
16	143	Philadelphia Eagles	J. R. Green	T	Rice	
16	144	Brooklyn Dodgers	Dennis Donovan	B	Oregon	
16	145	Cleveland Rams	Morris Kohler	B	Oregon State	
16	146	Detroit Lions	Jack Padley	B	Dayton	
16	147	Detroit Lions	Al Christianson	B	Knox	
16	148	Washington Redskins	Bolo Perdue	E	Duke	
16	149	Green Bay Packers	Ray Andrus	B	Vanderbilt	
16	150	New York Giants	Ned Swan	C	Drake	
17	151	Chicago Cardinals	Ralph Foster	T	Oklahoma A&M	
17	152	Philadelphia Eagles	Jim Molnar	B	Bradley	
17	153	Pittsburgh Steelers	Mickey Sullivan	E	NC State	
17	154	Brooklyn Dodgers	Frank Funair	B	Bucknell	
17	155	Cleveland Rams	Jack Nix	B	Mississippi State	
17	156	Detroit Lions	Johnny Hackenbruck	T	Oregon State	
17	157	Chicago Bears	Wilbur White	T	Bradley	
17	158	Washington Redskins	Steve Andrako	C	Ohio State	
17	159	Green Bay Packers	Archie Kodros	C	Michigan	
17	160	New York Giants	John Rogalla	B	Scranton	
18	161	Chicago Cardinals	Lowell Bryant	B	Clemson	
18	162	Pittsburgh Steelers	Seaton Daly	T	Gonzaga	
18	163	Philadelphia Eagles	Ernie Schwartzer	G	Boston College	
18	164	Brooklyn Dodgers	Walt Strosser	B	Saint Vincent	
18	165	Cleveland Rams	Ralph Stevenson	G	Oklahoma	
18	166	Detroit Lions	Frank Ribar	G	Duke	
18	167	Chicago Bears	Ralph Schlosser	C	Gonzaga	
18	168	Washington Redskins	Jay Graybeal	B	Oregon	
18	169	Green Bay Packers	Jim Gillette	B	Virginia	
18	170	New York Giants	Monk Edwards	T	Baylor	
19	171	Chicago Cardinals	Russ Buckley	B	Gustavus Adolphus	
19	172	Philadelphia Eagles	Bill Schneller	B	Ole Miss	
19	173	Pittsburgh Steelers	Thad Harvey	T	Notre Dame	
19	174	Brooklyn Dodgers	Steve Hydock	E	Albright	
19	175	Cleveland Rams	Dante Magnani ^{†}	B	Saint Mary's	
19	176	Detroit Lions	Herb McCarthy	B	Denver	
19	177	Chicago Bears	John Popov	B	Cincinnati	
19	178	Washington Redskins	Charley Slagle	B	North Carolina	
19	179	Green Bay Packers	Al Matuza ^{†}	C	Georgetown	
19	180	New York Giants	Cecil Walden	G	Oregon	
20	181	Chicago Cardinals	Rupert Pate	T	Wake Forest	
20	182	Pittsburgh Steelers	Marvin Katzenstein	T	Colorado Mines	
20	183	Philadelphia Eagles	Bill Debord	T	Kansas State	
20	184	Brooklyn Dodgers	Milt Howell	G	Auburn	
20	185	Cleveland Rams	Luke Lindon	T	Kentucky	
20	186	Detroit Lions	Dub Parten	T	Centenary	
20	187	Chicago Bears	Young Bussey ^{†}	B	LSU	
20	188	Washington Redskins	Buck Murphy	B	Georgia Tech	
20	189	Green Bay Packers	Jim Reeder	T	Illinois	
20	190	New York Giants	John Sullivan	E	San Francisco	
21	191	Detroit Lions	Malvern Morgan	C	Auburn	
21	192	Chicago Bears	Ray McLean ^{†}	B	Saint Anselm	
21	193	Washington Redskins	Mel Wetzel	T	Missouri	
21	194	Green Bay Packers	Vince Eichler	B	Cornell	
21	195	New York Giants	Weenie Bynum	B	Centenary	
22	196	Detroit Lions	Bob Orf	E	Missouri	
22	197	Chicago Bears	Walt Kichefski	E	Miami (FL)	
22	198	Washington Redskins	Steve Sitko	B	Notre Dame	
22	199	Green Bay Packers	Henry Luebcke	T	Iowa	
22	200	New York Giants	Myron Claxton	T	Whittier	

== Hall of Famers ==
- George McAfee, quarterback from Duke taken 1st round 2nd overall by the Philadelphia Eagles.

Inducted: Professional Football Hall of Fame class of 1966.

- Bulldog Turner, center from Hardin–Simmons taken 1st round 7th overall by the Chicago Bears.

Inducted: Professional Football Hall of Fame class of 1966.

== Notable undrafted players ==
^{†}	= Pro Bowler

Original NFL team	Player	Pos.	College	Notes
Cleveland Rams	Fred Gehrke	HB/CB	Utah	
Green Bay Packers	Ray Riddick	E	Fordham	
New York Giants	Jack Hinkle	HB	Syracuse	
Pittsburgh Steelers	Tommy Thompson ^{†}	QB	Tulsa	
Washington Redskins	Ray Hare ^{†}	HB	Gonzaga	
