= George Kiick =

American football player (1917–2002)

No. 9, 63
- Position: Fullback

Personal information
- Born: September 5, 1917; Hanover, Pennsylvania, U.S.
- Died: March 21, 2002 (aged 84); Pompton Plains, New Jersey, U.S.
- Listed height: 6 ft 0 in (1.83 m)
- Listed weight: 200 lb (91 kg)

Career information
- High school: Ephrata H.S. (PA)
- College: Bucknell
- NFL draft: 1940: 3rd round, 18th overall pick

Career history
- Pittsburgh Steelers (1940, 1945)

Career NFL statistics
- Rushing yards: 257
- Rushing average: 3.2
- Rushing touchdowns: 1
- Stats at Pro Football Reference

George Herman Kiick (September 5, 1917 – March 21, 2002) was an American professional football fullback. A star collegian at Bucknell, Kiick was selected with the 18th overall pick of the 1940 NFL draft by the Pittsburgh Steelers of the National Football League (NFL). He would play two years with the Steelers in a career bookending military service in World War II.

During the war, Kiick served in Europe as a lieutenant in the 2nd Armored Division of the United States Army. He was awarded a Silver Star for gallantry and earned a Purple Heart for wounds sustained.

George Kiick was the father of Miami Dolphins running back Jim Kiick and grandfather of tennis pro Allie Kiick. He was inducted into the Buckness University Hall of Fame in 1984.

== Biography ==
=== Early life ===
George Kiick was born September 5, 1917, in Hanover, Pennsylvania to Mr. and Mrs. John C. Kiick.

He attended Ephrata High School, located about 60 miles away from the place of his birth in Lancaster County, Pennsylvania. He was a star fullback for Ephrata, playing linebacker when the teams was on defense, elected team captain by his mates for his 1935 senior season. His brother William also played for Ephrata High during this season, starting as the team's quarterback.

One of the highlights of George Kiick's high school career was a 98-yard touchdown run described as "spine-tingling" by the local newspaper. He also was a frequent passer of the football even from the fullback position as part of the Mountaineers' offense.

Kiick was a three-sport start during his high school years, also leading the purple-and-gold of Ephrata High on the basketball court as a center Kiick was again named the Mountaineers' team captain during the 1935-36 basketball season, leading the team in scoring. He also played baseball.

Kiick was also president of the Ephrata High School chapter of the Hi-Y Club, high school section of the Young Men's Christian Association (YMCA).

=== Collegiate career ===
The two-sport star Kiick was heavily recruited, pursued by Penn State University and reported at one point to be headed to Temple University in Philadelphia to play football for Glenn "Pop" Warner. However, when the smoke cleared, it was Bucknell University, a small college located at Lewisburg, Pennsylvania that Kiick selected — a team headed by head coach Edward "Hooks" Mylin, former quarterback and star of Franklin & Marshall College in neighboring Lancaster.

Freshmen were prohibited from playing varsity football, so Kiick spent the 1936 season on the freshman team of the Bucknell Bisons. He also played basketball for Bucknell's freshman basketball team and baseball team, becoming the only three-sport letterman in Bucknell history.

As a sophomore Kiick was quickly added to the Bisons' starting eleven by Bucknell head coach Al Humphreys. He started in the season opener and did exemplary work as a blocking back, helping to open up holes in the opponents' defensive line for halfback Lou Tomasetti, who scored two touchdowns in a 21–0 win over Ursinus College.

Wilton Hazzard, writing in Illustrated Football Annual magazine, a major national publication of the day, was most enthusiastic about Kiick's abilities, reckoning him as one of "the stars of 1939" in the collegiate game. "This fish-hook fingered 200-pound basketball ace can snare long passes like a [Larry] Kelley, hit the line like Clarke Hinkle, or lay back and smear them like the great blond Ernie Nevers," Hazzard wrote.

He repeated his high school feat of dual captaincy in both football and basketball for Bucknell in his senior year of 1939–40, gaining national recognition on the gridiron as an honorable mention choice for All-American. He was named a member of the Northern Team for the 1939 Blue-Gray All-Star Game, playing in the second and fourth quarters in a 32–20 losing effort.

=== Professional career ===
Kiick was selected by the Steelers in the third round of the 1940 NFL draft by the Pittsburgh Steelers, who spent the 18th overall pick in the draft to obtain him. Pennsylvania-born, raised, and school, Kiick effectively had an opportunity to play for the home team of his native region.

Kiick made Pittsburgh's 33-man roster for the 1940 NFL season, seeing action in 11 games as a fullback for the Steelers. During his rookie season, Kiick saw action in 11 games, starting in 4, for Pittsburgh. He carried the ball 66 times for 212 yards on the ground (3.2 yards per carry) and grabbed 3 passes for an additional 22 yards during the team's 1940 season.

His career in pro football was interrupted by American entry into World War II, however. Kiick joined the US Army where he rose to rank of lieutenant in the 2nd Armored Division. Kiick fought in Europe, winning a Silver Star for gallantry as well as being awarded a Purple Heart for injuries sustained.

He was back in time for the 1945 NFL season, returning to the Steelers to resume his career. Moving to halfback for his second stint in the league, Kiick's second stint in the NFL was short-lived, with him seeing action in just six games.

=== Life after football ===
After his retirement from football, Kiick returned home to Ephrata, Pennsylvania, where he took a job as a teacher and assistant coach of the football team. He later became a coach at Butler High School in Morris County, New Jersey, making his home in neighboring Lincoln Park for the rest of his life.

Kiick married the former Alice Lohr, with whom he had two sons.

=== Death and legacy ===
George Kiick died March 21, 2002, at Chilton Memorial Hospital in Pompton Plains, New Jersey, after a two-year illness. He was 84 years old at the time of his death.

His son Jim Kiick was also a running back in professional football, primarily for the Miami Dolphins. His granddaughter Allie Kiick is a professional tennis player.

In 1984, Kiick was inducted into the Bucknell University Hall of Fame.
