= Bob Seymour =

American football player (1916–1977)

No. 20, 82
- Positions: Halfback, Fullback

Personal information
- Born: June 13, 1916; Wyandotte, Oklahoma, U.S.
- Died: May 28, 1977 (aged 60); Golden, Colorado, U.S.
- Listed height: 6 ft 2 in (1.88 m)
- Listed weight: 205 lb (93 kg)

Career information
- High school: Commerce (OK)
- College: Oklahoma (1936-1939)
- NFL draft: 1940: 10th round, 88th overall pick

Career history
- Washington Redskins (1940–1945); Los Angeles Dons (1946)

Awards and highlights
- NFL champion (1942); Pro Bowl (1942); First-team All-Big Six (1939)

Career NFL/AAFC statistics
- Rushing yards: 1,311
- Rushing average: 3.3
- Receptions: 72
- Receiving yards: 817
- Interceptions: 18
- Total touchdowns: 23
- Stats at Pro Football Reference

Robert Arnold Seymour (June 13, 1916 – May 28, 1977) was an American professional football running back in the National Football League (NFL) for the Washington Redskins. He was selected in the tenth round of the 1940 NFL draft. Seymour also played in the All-America Football Conference (AAFC) for the Los Angeles Dons. He played college football at the University of Oklahoma.

== NFL career statistics ==
Legend
	Won the NFL Championship
	Led the league
**Bold**	Career high

=== Regular season ===
Year	Team	Games		Rushing					Receiving				
Year	Team	GP	GS	Att	Yds	Avg	Lng	TD	Rec	Yds	Avg	Lng	TD
1940	WAS	9	0	57	170	3.0	-	**4**	2	3	1.5	-	0
1941	WAS	10	2	62	137	2.2	17	2	6	85	**14.2**	41	2
1942	WAS	11	1	54	190	3.5	18	1	3	20	6.7	12	0
1943	WAS	10	2	65	232	**3.6**	**40**	0	17	167	9.8	32	2
1944	WAS	10	7	**92**	**315**	3.4	35	3	**19**	**263**	13.8	**71**	**3**
1945	WAS	10	2	30	102	3.4	23	2	8	91	11.4	27	1
		60	14	360	1,146	3.2	40	12	55	629	11.4	71	8

=== Playoffs ===
Year	Team	Games		Rushing					Receiving				
Year	Team	GP	GS	Att	Yds	Avg	Lng	TD	Rec	Yds	Avg	Lng	TD
1940	WAS	1	0	4	16	**4.0**	**16**	0	**1**	7	7.0	7	0
1942	WAS	1	0	**14**	**41**	2.9	11	0	0	0	0.0	0	0
1943	WAS	2	0	7	8	1.1	0	0	**1**	**14**	**14.0**	**14**	0
1945	WAS	1	1	0	0	0.0	0	0	**1**	8	8.0	8	**1**
		5	1	25	65	2.6	16	0	3	29	9.7	14	1
