= Olie Cordill (American football, born 1916) =

American football player (1916–1988)

No. 1
- Positions: Wingback, Halfback, Punter

Personal information
- Born: April 28, 1916; Big Spring, Texas, U.S.
- Died: November 14, 1988 (aged 72); Travis County, Texas, U.S.
- Listed height: 6 ft 2 in (1.88 m)
- Listed weight: 190 lb (86 kg)

Career information
- High school: Big Spring
- College: Rice (1936-1939)
- NFL draft: 1940: 1st round, 5th overall pick

Career history
- Cleveland Rams (1940)

Awards and highlights
- Pro Bowl (1940); First-team All-SWC (1939); Second-team All-SWC (1938)

Career NFL statistics
- Rushing yards: 73
- Rushing average: 3
- Receptions: 14
- Receiving yards: 158
- Total touchdowns: 2
- Stats at Pro Football Reference

Olie James Cordill (April 28, 1916 – November 14, 1988) was an American professional football halfback in the National Football League (NFL). A first round selection (fifth overall pick) in the 1940 NFL draft out of Rice University, Cordill played for the Cleveland Rams in that year. His son Olie Cordill also played in the NFL.
