= Frank Zadworney =

American football player (1916–1979)

- Frank Zadworney, 1939, at Ohio State

No. 21
- Positions: Halfback, Defensive back

Personal information
- Born: November 14, 1916; Washington, Pennsylvania, U.S.
- Died: March 24, 1979 (aged 62); Westerville, Ohio, U.S.
- Listed height: 6 ft 0 in (1.83 m)
- Listed weight: 202 lb (92 kg)

Career information
- College: Ohio State (1936-1939)
- NFL draft: 1940: 8th round, 64th overall pick

Career history
- Brooklyn Dodgers (1940)

Career NFL statistics
- Rushing yards: 5
- Rushing average: 2.5
- Stats at Pro Football Reference

Frank Stanley Zadworney (November 14, 1916 – March 24, 1979) was an American football halfback on both offense and defense. He played college football for Ohio State (1936-1939) and professional football for the Brooklyn Dodgers (1940).

== Early life ==
Zadworney was born in 1916 at Washington, Pennsylvania. He attended Washington High School.

== Ohio State ==
Zadworney then enrolled at Ohio State University and played college football as a halfback for the Ohio State Buckeyes from 1936 to 1939. Ohio State line coach Ernie Godfrey said: "Zadworney was an excellent blocker. He's probably the best blocker Ohio State ever had. . . . He cleaned 'em all out, ends, tackles, fullbacks, as the assignemnt demanded." He played on the 1939 Ohio State Buckeyes football team that won the Big Ten Conference championship.

== Professional football ==
Zadworney was drafted by the Brooklyn Dodgers in the eighth round (64th overall pick) in the 1940 NFL draft. He appeared in three games for the Dodgers as a halfback, on both offense and defense, during the 1940 season. The 1940 Brooklyn Dodgers compiled an 8–3 record and placed second in the NFL East.

== Later life ==
In 1942, Zadworney became a football coach at Catholic University. He also served in the military during World War II. He also coached football at Aquinas High School in Columbus, Ohio both before and after the war.

Zadworney died in 1979 at Columbus, Ohio.
