= Ted Grabinski =

American football player (1916–2000)

- Ted Grabinski, 1939

No. 11, 53
- Positions: Center, linebacker, guard

Personal information
- Born: February 16, 1916; Pittsburgh
- Died: November 30, 2000 (age 84); Sarasota, Florida
- Listed height: 6 ft 2 in (1.88 m)
- Listed weight: 207 lb (94 kg)

Career information
- High school: Ambridge (PA)
- College: Duquesne
- NFL draft: 1939: undrafted

Career history
- Pittsburgh Steelers (1939–1940)
- Stats at Pro Football Reference

Thaddeus "Ted" Grabinski (February 6, 1916 – November 30, 2000) was an American football player. He played college football for Duquesne and professional football for the Pittsburgh Pirates/Steelers.

== Early life ==
A native of Pittsburgh, he attended Ambridge High School and played college football for the Duquesne Dukes from 1935 to 1938.

== Professional football ==
In January 1939, he signed to play professional football in the National Football League (NFL) for the Pittsburgh Pirates (renamed the Steelers one year later). He played for the Pirates in Pittsburgh Pirates and the Steelers in 1940. He appeared in 21 NFL games as a center, linebacker, and guard.

== Military service and later years ==
In February 1941, he was drafted into the Army.

After World War II, he played professional football in the All-America Football Conference (AAFC) for the Buffalo Bisons during their 1946 season. He also played in 1946 for the Bethlehem Bulldogs in the American Association.

Grabinski died in 2000.
