= Rhoten Shetley =

American football player (1918–1993)

- Shetley in 1942

No. 83, 20
- Position: Halfback

Personal information
- Born: February 7, 1918; Wolf Creek, Tennessee, U.S.
- Died: January 7, 1993 (aged 74); Greenville, South Carolina, U.S.
- Listed height: 5 ft 11 in (1.80 m)
- Listed weight: 208 lb (94 kg)

Career information
- High school: Union (SC)
- College: Furman
- NFL draft: 1940: 3rd round, 19th overall pick

Career history
- Brooklyn Dodgers (NFL) (1940–1942); Brooklyn Dodgers (AAFC) (1946)

Awards and highlights
- First-team All-SoCon (1939)

Career NFL statistics
- Rushing yards: 58
- Rushing average: 3.4
- Receptions: 16
- Receiving yards: 196
- Total touchdowns: 3
- Stats at Pro Football Reference

Rhoten Nathan Shetley (February 7, 1918 – January 7, 1993) was an American professional football halfback. A collegian at Furman University in Greenville, South Carolina, Shetley played four years of professional football for the Brooklyn Dodgers franchise of the National Football League (NFL) and All-America Football Conference (AAFC).

== Early life ==
Shetley was born in Wolf Creek, Tennessee, in 1918. He was raised in Union, South Carolina, and attended Union High School in that city. He played college football at Furman from 1937 to 1939. He was a single-wing fullback at Furman and was selected to the All-Southern Conference and Little All-America teams.

== Professional football and military service ==
Shetley in 1940.

Shetley was selected by the Brooklyn Dodgers in the third round (19th overall pick) of the 1940 NFL draft. He played for the Dodgers from 1940 to 1942. As a rookie, he played in a backfield with Ace Parker and Banks McFadden, leading the 1940 Brooklyn Dodgers to an 8–3 record.

Shetley missed the 1942, 1943, and 1944 seasons while serving in the military during World War II.

In 1946, Shetley played for the Brooklyn Dodgers of the new All-America Football Conference. In four years of professional football, Shetley appeared in 38 games, 26 as a starter, caught 16 passes for 196 yards and two touchdowns and rushed for 58 yards on 17 carries. He also played on defense, intercepting three passes.

== Later life ==
After retiring as a player, Shetley became a high school football coach in Florence, South Carolina, leading his team to a state championship in 1950. Without attending law school, he passed the South Carolina bar and worked as a trial lawyer in Greenville, South Carolina, for almost 30 years. He died in 1993 in Greenville.
