= Rex Williams (American football) =

American football player (1918–2007)

- Williams, circa 1942

No. 56, 16, 4, 51
- Position: Center

Personal information
- Born: May 12, 1918; Bonham, Texas, U.S.
- Died: September 8, 2007 (aged 89); Brentwood, Florida, U.S.
- Listed height: 6 ft 2 in (1.88 m)
- Listed weight: 203 lb (92 kg)

Career information
- High school: Sherman (Sherman, Texas)
- College: Texas Tech
- NFL draft: 1940: 7th round, 60th overall pick

Career history
- Chicago Cardinals (1940); New York Yankees (1940–1941); Detroit Lions (1945)

Career NFL statistics
- Games played: 3
- Stats at Pro Football Reference

Rex B. Williams (May 12, 1918 – September 8, 2007) was an American professional football player.

Born in Bonham, Texas, Williams attended Sherman High School in Texas and played college football for Texas Tech from 1937 to 1939. He played professional football in the National Football League (NFL) as a center for the Chicago Cardinals in 1940 and for the Detroit Lions in 1945. He appeared in three NFL games. Between stints with the Cardinals and Lions, he served in the U.S. Navy during World War II. He was released by the Lions in mid-October 1945.
