= Marty Christiansen =

American football player (1916–1999)

No. 51
- Position: Fullback

Personal information
- Born: April 23, 1916; Minneapolis, Minnesota, U.S.
- Died: March 29, 1999 (aged 82); Minneapolis, Minnesota, U.S.
- Listed height: 6 ft 0 in (1.83 m)
- Listed weight: 200 lb (91 kg)

Career information
- High school: Washburn (Minneapolis)
- College: Minnesota (1935-1939)
- NFL draft: 1940: 5th round, 31st overall pick

Career history
- Chicago Cardinals (1940)

Career NFL statistics
- Rushing yards: 71
- Rushing average: 2.2
- Touchdowns: 1
- Stats at Pro Football Reference

Martin Alexander Christiansen (April 23, 1916 – March 29, 1999) was an American football fullback.

Christiansen was born in Minneapolis in 1916 and attended Washburn High School in that city. He played college football as a fullback for the University of Minnesota from 1937 to 1939.

Christiansen was selected in the fifth round (31st overall pick) of the 1940 NFL draft. He played professional football in the National Football League (NFL) for the Chicago Cardinals during the 1940 season. He tallied 71 rushing yards and one touchdown in six games for the Cardinals.

In April 1942, Christiansen enlisted in the United States Marine Corps. He saw his first action leading a squad of riflemen at the Battle of Tarawa in 1943. He recalled that his squad came ashore after the flame throwers cleared the way, burning Japanese soldiers out of pillboxes and other defensive positions. He compared the flame throwers to blockers who cleared the way for his unit. His unit then fought a large unit of Japanese marines. He recalled: "I must have thrown more than a dozen hand grenades that day. More than 600 Japs were wiped out during this fight. Shortly before the battle was won, shrapnel fragments from an exploding enemy grenade entered my leg." He extended the football analogy, saying he felt like he was pulled from the game on the verge of victory "just on account of a leg injury." He returned home to Minneapolis in February 1944.

After the war, Christiansen served as a police officer in Minneapolis and later owned a gas station. He died on March 29, 1999 in Minneapolis.
