= Win Pedersen =

American football player (1915–1983)

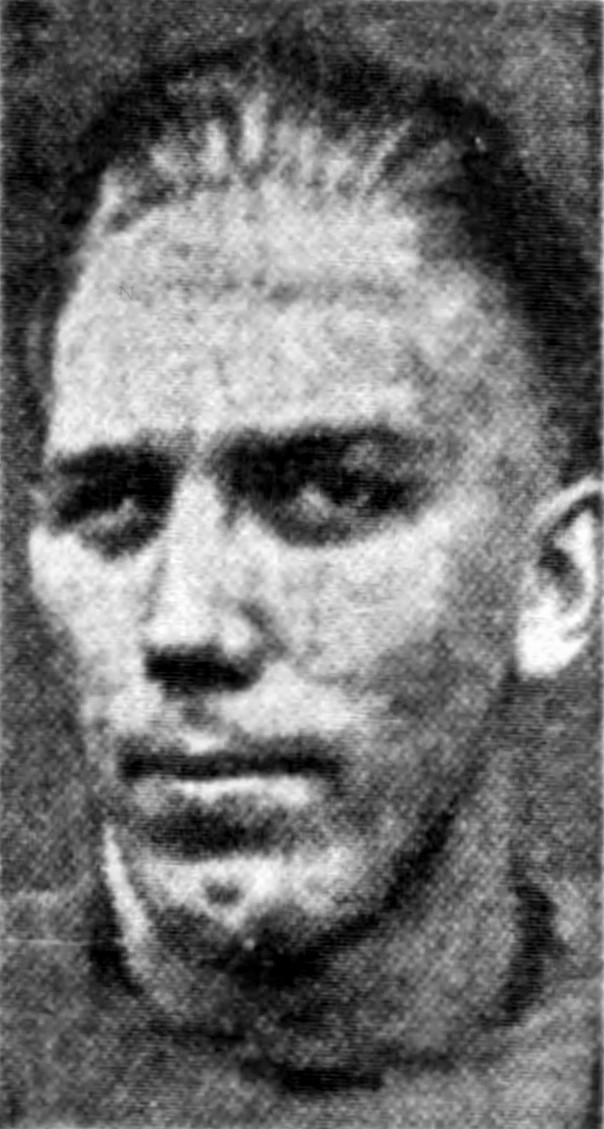
- Pedersen in the Minneapolis Star Tribune in 1938

No. 2, 66, 15, 43
- Position: Tackle

Personal information
- Born: June 8, 1915; Chicago, Illinois, U.S.
- Died: January 17, 1983 (aged 67); Hopkins, Minnesota, U.S.
- Listed height: 6 ft 3 in (1.91 m)
- Listed weight: 223 lb (101 kg)

Career information
- High school: West (Minneapolis, Minnesota)
- College: Minnesota (1935-1939)
- NFL draft: 1940: 8th round, 70th overall pick

Career history

Playing
- Milwaukee Chiefs (1940); New York Giants (1941, 1945); Boston Yanks (1946)

Coaching
- Milwaukee Chiefs (1940) Line coach

Awards and highlights
- Third-team All-American (1939); First-team All-Big Ten (1939)

Career NFL statistics
- Games played: 23
- Games started: 7
- Fumble recoveries: 2
- Stats at Pro Football Reference

Windinge Christian "Win" Pedersen (June 7, 1915 - January 16, 1983), sometimes listed as Win Pederson, was an American professional football player.

== Early life ==
Pedersen was born in 1915 in Chicago and attended West High School in Minneapolis.

== Football career ==
He played college football for the Minnesota Golden Gophers football team from 1937 to 1939 and was captain of Minnesota's 1939 team. He was regarded as an "iron man" who appeared in 420 of 480 minutes for the 1938 Minnesota team and 370-1/2 out of 430 minutes for the 1939 team, including the full 60 minutes in four games. At the end of the 1939 season, he was selected by both the Associated Press and the United Press as a third-team tackle on the 1939 College Football All-America Team. He also competed for the Minneapolis Rowing club.

He was drafted by the New York Giants with the 70th pick in the 1940 NFL draft and played for the Giants during the 1941 NFL season. He missed three seasons to Army service during World War II. He returned to the Giants in 1945. He also played for the Boston Yanks in 1946. He appeared in a total of 25 NFL games, seven of them as a starter. During the 1940 season, he also played for the Milwaukee Chiefs of the American Football League and the Jersey City Giants of the American Football Association.

== Death ==
Pedersen died in 1983 at age 67 in Hopkins, Minnesota.
