= Walt Kichefski =

American football player and coach (1916–1992)

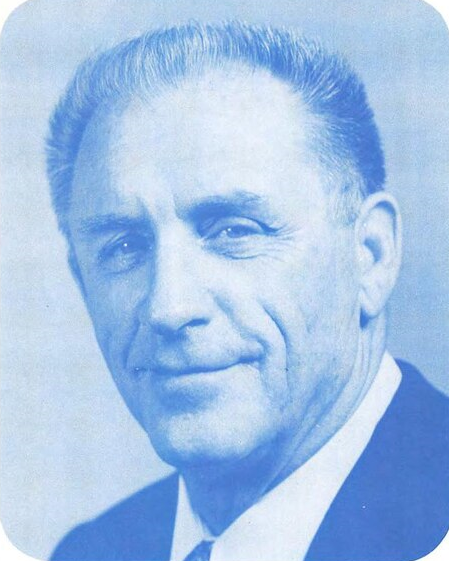
- Kichefski in 1976

No. 45, 42
- Position: End

Personal information
- Born: June 17, 1916; Rhinelander, Wisconsin, U.S.
- Died: January 9, 1992 (aged 75); South Miami, Florida, U.S.
- Listed height: 6 ft 1 in (1.85 m)
- Listed weight: 212 lb (96 kg)

Career information
- High school: Rhinelander
- College: Miami (FL) (1935-1939)
- NFL draft: 1940: 22nd round, 197th overall pick

Career history

Playing
- Pittsburgh Steelers (1940–1942); "Card-Pitt" (1944)

Coaching
- Miami (FL) (1943) Line coach; Miami (FL) (1945–1970) Assistant coach; Miami (FL) (1970) Interim head coach

Career NFL statistics
- Receptions: 30
- Receiving yards: 411
- Touchdowns: 1
- Stats at Pro Football Reference

Walter Raymond Kichefski (June 17, 1916 – January 9, 1992) was an American football player and coach. He was drafted in the 22nd round of the 1940 NFL draft. He played professionally in the National Football League (NFL) with the Pittsburgh Steelers, from 1940 to 1942, and again in 1944 with Card-Pitt, a team that was the result of a temporary merger between the Chicago Cardinals and the Steelers due to league-wide player shortages during World War II.

Kichefski also served in the military during World War II. His name is included on the NFL honor roll, which lists over 1,000 NFL personnel who served in the military during World War II.

== Career ==
Kichefski played college football at the University of Miami. He served as interim head coach there for the final nine games of the 1970 season, following Charlie Tate's resignation, guiding the team to a 2–7 record. He began his Miami coaching career in 1943 as line mentor. After playing the 1944 season with Card-Pitt, he rejoined the Hurricanes and the team went on to win the 1946 Orange Bowl. Kichefski was later recognized by the school with the title "The Gator Hater", which was aimed at the rival University of Florida.

As coach at the University of Miami, Kichefski mentored All-Americans Ted Hendricks, Bill Miller, and Ed Weisacosky. He was inducted into the University of Miami Sports Hall of Fame in 1969.

== Death ==
Kichefski died on January 9, 1992, at age 75 at his home in South Miami, Florida.

== Legacy ==
The Walter Kichefski Football Award, named after Kichefski, is presented annually to the top scholar-athlete in the Miami football program. The Walter Kichefski Endowed Football Scholarship was created in 1992, in memory of Kichefski. $400,000 was initially raised to endow the scholarship, the only undergraduate award presented by the University of Miami Sports Hall of Fame. The scholarship recipient is chosen each year by the football coaches, with the award going to the player who most embodies the characteristics by which Kichefski lived.

== Head coaching record ==
Year	Team	Overall	Conference	Standing	Bowl/playoffs
Miami Hurricanes (NCAA University Division independent) (1970)
1970	Miami	2–7			
Miami:		2–7			
Total:		2–7			
