= Luke Lindon =

American football player (1915–1988)

No. 47, 77
- Position: Tackle

Personal information
- Born: June 23, 1915; Salyersville, Kentucky, U.S.
- Died: April 21, 1988 (aged 72); Roanoke, Virginia, U.S.
- Listed height: 5 ft 10 in (1.78 m)
- Listed weight: 243 lb (110 kg)

Career information
- College: Kentucky
- NFL draft: 1940: 20th round, 185th overall pick

Career history
- Boston Bears (1940); Detroit Lions (1944–1945)

Career NFL statistics
- Games played: 14
- Games started: 11
- Stats at Pro Football Reference

Luther W. Lindon (June 23, 1915 – April 21, 1988) was an American football tackle. He was drafted by the Cleveland Rams but never played a game for them. He played for the Detroit Lions from 1944 to 1945.
