= Carl Nery =

American football player (1917–2007)

No. 40
- Position: Guard

Personal information
- Born: June 17, 1917; Lawrenceville, Pennsylvania, U.S.
- Died: March 9, 2007 (aged 89); Scott Township, Allegheny County, Pennsylvania, U.S.
- Listed height: 6 ft 0 in (1.83 m)
- Listed weight: 214 lb (97 kg)

Career information
- High school: Springdale
- College: Duquesne
- NFL draft: 1940: 8th round, 62nd overall pick

Career history
- Pittsburgh Steelers (1940–1941)

Awards and highlights
- Third-team All-American (1939); Second-team All-Eastern (1939)

Career NFL statistics
- Games played: 22
- Games started: 4
- Stats at Pro Football Reference

Carl Nicholas Nery (June 17, 1917 – March 9, 2007) was an American professional football player.

Nery was born in Lawrenceville, Pennsylvania, in 1917, and attended Springdale High School. He played college football for the Duquesne Dukes football team from 1938 to 1940. In December 1939, the sports editor of the Pittsburgh Post-Gazette rated him as the most valuable player in the country, pointing to his versatility

He is almost equally at home in the backfield or in the line. . . . Anyone who can shuttle from fullback, to end, to a tackle, and then to guard, and leave nothing whatever to be desired in handling any of these varied assignments, obviously must rank high in the national picture . . . "

He was selected by the Central Press Association as a third-team guard on the 1939 College Football All-America Team. He was also selected to play on the Eastern College All-Star team in the Fresh Air Fund game in September 1940.

Nery was drafted by the Pittsburgh Steelers with the 62nd pick in the 1940 NFL draft and played for the Steelers during the 1940 and 1941 NFL seasons. He appeared in 21 games for the Steelers. He was paid $125 per game by the Steelers during the 1940 season and supplemented his income with construction jobs in the off-season. He was drafted into military service in August 1942.

Nery died in 2007 in Scott, Pennsylvania.
