= 1939 All-Southern Conference football team =

The 1939 All-Southern Conference football team consists of American football players chosen by the Associated Press (AP) and United Press (UP) for the All-Southern Conference football team for the 1939 college football season.

== All-Southern Conference selections ==
=== Backs ===
- Snuffy Stirnweiss, North Carolina (AP-1; UP-1)
- George McAfee, Duke (AP-1; UP-1)
- Banks McFadden, Clemson (AP-1; UP-1) (College Football Hall of Fame)
- Rhoten Shetley, Furman (AP-1; UP-1)
- Jim Lalanne, North Carolina (UP-2)
- Paul Shu, VMI (UP-2)
- Shad Bryant, Clemson (UP-2)
- John Polanski, Wake Forest (UP-2)

=== Ends ===
- Joe Blalock, Clemson (AP-1; UP-1)
- Paul Severin, North Carolina (AP-1; UP-1)
- Bill Bailey, Duke (UP-2)
- Bill Burge, Richmond (UP-2)

=== Tackles ===
- Rupert Pate, Wake Forest (AP-1; UP-1)
- Dick Boisseau, Washington & Lee (AP-1; UP-2)
- Ty Coon, NC State (UP-1)
- Gates Kimball, North Carolina (UP-2)

=== Guards ===
- Frank Ribar, Duke (AP-1; UP-1)
- Allen Johnson, Duke (AP-1; UP-1)
- Jim Woodson, North Carolina (UP-2)
- Frank Kapriva, Wake Forest (UP-2)

=== Centers ===
- Ed Merrick, Richmond (AP-1; UP-1)
- Bill Retter, NC State (UP-2)

== Key ==
AP = Associated Press

UP = United Press

== See also ==
- 1939 College Football All-America Team
