= 1938 All-Southwest Conference football team =

American college football all-star team

The 1938 All-Southwest Conference football team consists of American football players chosen by various organizations for All-Southwest Conference teams for the 1938 college football season. The selectors for the 1938 season included the Associated Press (AP) and the Newspaper Enterprise Association (NEA).

== All Southwest selections ==
=== Backs ===
- Davey O'Brien, Texas Christian (AP-1 [QB], NEA-1) (College Football Hall of Fame)
- Billy Patterson, Baylor (AP-1 [HB], NEA-1)
- Dick Todd, Texas A&M (AP-1 [HB], NEA-1)
- John Sparks, Texas Christian (AP-1 [FB], NEA-1)
- John Kimbrough, Texas A&M (NEA-1)
- Kay Eakin, Arkansas (AP-2)
- E. Clark, Texas Christian (AP-2)
- Olie Cordill, Rice (AP-2)
- Wallace Lawson, Texas (AP-2)

=== Ends ===
- Sam Boyd, Baylor (AP-1; NEA-1)
- Billy Dewell, Southern Methodist (AP-1; NEA-1)
- Don Looney, Texas Christian (AP-2)
- Durwood Horner, Texas Christian (AP-2)

=== Tackles ===
- I. B. Hale, Texas Christian (AP-1; NEA-1)
- Joe Boyd, Texas A&M (AP-1; NEA-1)
- Allie White, Texas Christian (AP-2)
- J. Sanders, Southern Methodist (AP-2)

=== Guards ===
- Forrest Kline, Texas Christian (AP-1; NEA-1)
- Jack Rhodes, Texas (AP-1)
- George Sanders, Southern Methodist (AP-2; NEA-1)
- Matt Landry, Rice (AP-2)

=== Centers ===
- Ki Aldrich, Texas Christian (AP-1; NEA-1)
- Lloyd Woodell, Arkansas (AP-2)

== Key ==
AP = Associated Press

NEA = Newspaper Enterprise Association

== See also ==
- 1938 College Football All-America Team
