= Dom Principe =

American football player (1917–2010)

- Principe, circa 1939

No. 26, 25, 94
- Positions: Fullback, Linebacker

Personal information
- Born: February 9, 1917; Brockton, Massachusetts, U.S.
- Died: April 9, 2010 (aged 93); Jupiter, Florida, U.S.
- Listed height: 6 ft 0 in (1.83 m)
- Listed weight: 205 lb (93 kg)

Career information
- High school: Brockton
- College: Fordham (1936-1939)
- NFL draft: 1940: 9th round, 80th overall pick

Career history
- New York Giants (1940–1942); Brooklyn Dodgers (1946)

Awards and highlights
- Third-team All-American (1939); First-team All-Eastern (1939)

Career NFL/AAFC statistics
- Rushing yards: 152
- Rushing average: 3
- Receptions: 9
- Receiving yards: 112
- Total touchdowns: 2
- Stats at Pro Football Reference

Dominic Alfred Principe (February 9, 1917 – April 9, 2010) was an American professional football player. He played college football for Fordham and professional football for the New York Giants and Brooklyn Dodgers.

== Early life ==
Principe was born in 1917 in Brockton, Massachusetts, and attended Brockton High School.

== Fordham ==
He played college football for the Fordham Rams football team from 1936 to 1939. He was selected by the Associated Press (AP) as a first-team back on the 1939 All-Eastern football team. He was also selected by the AP, United Press and Newspaper Enterprise Association as a third-team fullback on the 1939 College Football All-America Team.

== Professional football and military service ==
Principe was drafted by the New York Giants with the 80th pick in the 1940 NFL draft and played for the Giants during the 1940, 1941, and 1942 NFL seasons. His football career was then interrupted by service in the Navy during World War II. After the war, he played for the Brooklyn Dodgers of the All-America Football Conference (AAFC) during the 1946 season. He appeared in a total of 34 NFL and AAFC games, nine of them as a starter. He tallied 152 rushing yards, 112 receiving yards, scored two touchdowns, and intercepted one pass.

== Later life ==
After football, Principe worked as a Special Agent with the FBI, retiring in 1974, in New York City.

Principe died in 2010 in Jupiter, Florida.
