= Ty Coon =

American football player (1915–1992)

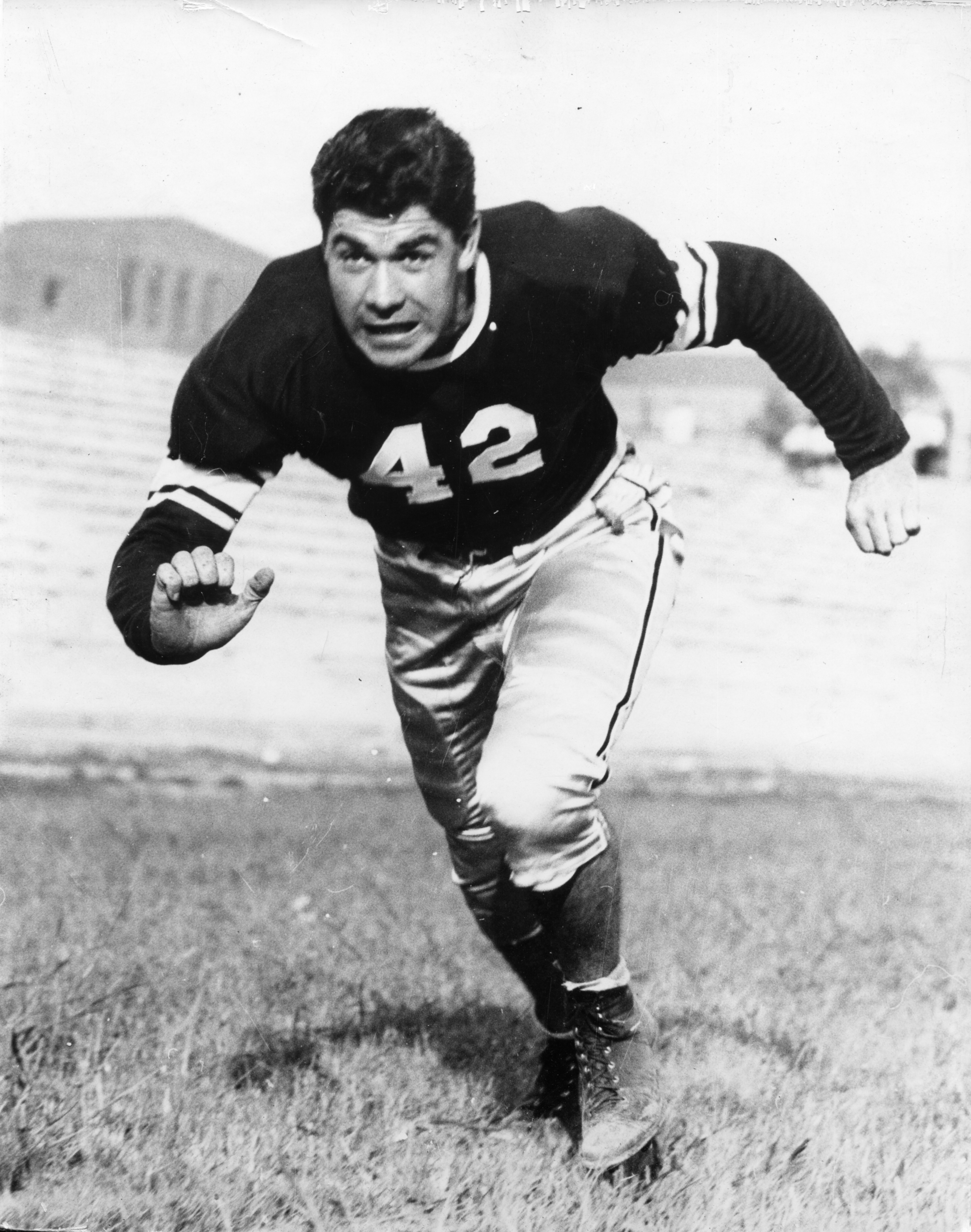

No. 8
- Position: Guard

Personal information
- Born: July 26, 1915; White Plains, New York, U.S.
- Died: January 9, 1992 (aged 76); Watertown, Connecticut, U.S.
- Listed height: 6 ft 0 in (1.83 m)
- Listed weight: 215 lb (98 kg)

Career information
- College: NC State
- NFL draft: 1940: 7th round, 54th overall pick

Career history
- Brooklyn Dodgers (1940)

Awards and highlights
- Second-team All-American (1939); 2× First-team All-SoCon (1938, 1939)

Career NFL statistics
- Games played: 9
- Stats at Pro Football Reference

Edward Howard "Ty" Coon Jr. (July 26, 1915 – January 9, 1992) was an American professional football player was an offensive lineman for two seasons with the Brooklyn Dodgers of the National Football League (NFL). He played college football for the NC State Wolfpack. He was selected in the seventh round of the 1940 NFL draft.
