= Frank Emmons =

American football player (1918–2005)

No. 44
- Position: Fullback

Personal information
- Born: September 17, 1918; Portland, Oregon, U.S.
- Died: November 5, 2005 (aged 87); Edmonds, Washington, U.S.
- Listed height: 6 ft 1 in (1.85 m)
- Listed weight: 213 lb (97 kg)

Career information
- High school: Beaverton (OR)
- College: Oregon
- NFL draft: 1940: 5th round, 32nd overall pick

Career history
- Philadelphia Eagles (1940)

Career NFL statistics
- Rushing yards: 77
- Rushing average: 2.7
- Receptions: 3
- Receiving yards: 19
- Total touchdowns: 2
- Stats at Pro Football Reference

Franklin Boone Emmons (September 17, 1918 – November 5, 2005) was an American professional football player who was a fullback for the Philadelphia Eagles of the National Football League (NFL) for one season in 1940. He played college football for the Oregon Ducks before being selected by the Eagles in the fifth round of the 1940 NFL draft.

After playing for the Eagles as a rookie in 1940, the team moved to Pittsburgh in a series of transactions known as the Pennsylvania Polka and became the Pittsburgh Steelers. He did not play for the Steelers in 1941, however, and retired shortly after. He served in World War II for the United States Army Air Forces.
