= Don Looney =

American football player (1916–2015)

No. 30
- Position: End

Personal information
- Born: September 2, 1916; Sulphur Springs, Texas, U.S.
- Died: April 5, 2015 (aged 98); Fort Worth, Texas, U.S.
- Listed height: 6 ft 2 in (1.88 m)
- Listed weight: 182 lb (83 kg)

Career information
- High school: Sulphur Springs
- College: TCU (1936–1939)
- NFL draft: 1940: 8th round, 63rd overall pick

Career history
- Philadelphia Eagles (1940); Pittsburgh Steelers (1941–1942)

Awards and highlights
- Pro Bowl (1940); NFL receptions leader (1940); NFL receiving yards leader (1940); National champion (1938); First-team All-SWC (1939); Second-team All-SWC (1938)

Career NFL statistics
- Receptions: 75
- Receiving yards: 952
- Receiving touchdowns: 7
- Stats at Pro Football Reference

John Don Looney (September 2, 1916 – April 5, 2015) was an American professional football end in the National Football League (NFL). He was selected in the eighth round of the 1940 NFL draft. He played three seasons for the Philadelphia Eagles (1940) and the Pittsburgh Steelers (1941–1942).

Looney set new NFL records for catches and yards in a single game during his 1940 rookie season and led the league in receiving yards, topping Packers player and Hall of Fame inductee Don Hutson.

== Biography ==
Looney's 707 yards receiving led the NFL in 1940, topping Hall of Famer Don Hutson.

Don Looney was born September 2, 1916, in Sulphur Springs, Texas.

Drafted into the NFL ahead of the 1940 season, Looney was the first receiver in NFL history to have over 100 yards receiving in each of his first two games, a feat which was not equaled until the 2008 NFL season by another Eagles wide receiver, DeSean Jackson. He also set new NFL records for most catches in a game (14) and most yards gained receiving in a single game (180) during the season. His 707 total yards gained receiving were the highest in the NFL for the 1940 season, topping the year of Hall of Fame Packers end Don Hutson.

Looney served in World War II for the United States Army after the 1942 season. He did not resume his professional football career after termination of the war, instead becoming an NFL official.

At the time of his death at the age of 98, Looney was the second oldest living former NFL player. He was the father of NFL running back Joe Don Looney, who died in a one-person motorcycle accident after his NFL career ended. Looney's partner was Linda Roark, whom he met in 1992.

== NFL career statistics ==
Legend
	Led the league
**Bold**	Career high

Year	Team	Games		Receiving				
Year	Team	GP	GS	Rec	Yds	Avg	Lng	TD
1940	PHI	11	8	**58**	**707**	12.2	47	**4**
1941	PIT	9	0	10	186	**18.6**	**66**	1
1942	PIT	3	1	7	59	8.4	14	1
Career		23	9	75	952	12.7	66	6
