= 1939 All-Eastern football team =

American all-star college football team

The 1939 All-Eastern football team consists of American football players chosen by various selectors as the best players at each position among the Eastern colleges and universities during the 1939 college football season.

== All-Eastern selections ==
=== Backs ===
- Ed Boell, NYU (AP-1)
- Ronnie Cahill, Holy Cross (AP-1)
- Bill Hutchinson, Dartmouth (AP-1)
- Dom Principe, Fordham (AP-1)
- Walter Matuszczak, Cornell (AP-2)
- Frank Reagan, Penn (AP-2)
- Mike Basca, Villanova (AP-2)
- Merl Condit, Carnegie Tech (AP-2)

=== Ends ===
- Harlan Gustafson, Penn (AP-1)
- Alva Kelley, Cornell (AP-1)
- Bob Nowaskey, George Washington (AP-2)
- John Dickinson, Pittsburgh (AP-2)

=== Tackles ===
- Nick Drahos, Cornell (AP-1)
- Harry Stella, Army (AP-1)
- Carl Nery, Duquesne (AP-2)
- Bob Tierney, Princeton (AP-2)

=== Guards ===
- Agostino Lio, Georgetown (AP-1)
- Ernest Schwotzer, Boston College (AP-1)
- Jim Turner, Holy Cross (AP-2)
- Wade Mori, Penn State (AP-2)

=== Centers ===
- Frank Finneran, Cornell (AP-1)
- Joseph W. Stack, Yale (AP-2)

== Key ==
- AP = Associated Press

== See also ==
- 1939 College Football All-America Team
