= Mike Basca =

American football player (1917–1944)

Profile
- Position: Halfback

Personal information
- Born: December 4, 1917; Phoenixville, Pennsylvania, U.S.
- Died: November 11, 1944 (aged 26); Obreck, German-occupied France

Career information
- College: Villanova

Career history
- Philadelphia Eagles (1941)

Awards and highlights
- Second-team All-Eastern (1939)
- Stats at Pro Football Reference

Other information
- Military career
- Allegiance: United States
- Branch: U.S. Army
- Service years: 1941–1944
- Rank: Corporal
- Unit: 4th Armored Division
- Conflicts: World War II: Western Front; Western Allied invasion of France †

Michael Martin Basca (December 4, 1917 – November 11, 1944) was an American professional football player who was a halfback in the National Football League (NFL). He played one season for the Philadelphia Eagles (1941) after attending Villanova University.

== Biography ==
Basca and his brothers enlisted for World War II military service in the United States Army after the attack on Pearl Harbor. In 1942, he was a member of Robert Neyland's All-Army football team that played against NFL teams in fundraising games.

Assigned as a tank commander, he served in the 4th Armored Division in Europe and participated in the Normandy landings, where he landed on Utah Beach. The 4th helped lead the Third Army through Europe.

== Death and legacy ==
On November 11, 1944, Basca was killed instantly when his tank was struck by a German 88-millimeter anti-tank round after four months in combat.

A year after his death, the Eagles honored Basca prior to their game against the New York Giants.

His body was returned to Pennsylvania in 1948 and arrived nine days after the Eagles won the 1948 NFL Championship Game. He is currently honored in the Football's Wartime Heroes display at the Pro Football Hall of Fame.
