= Clark Goff =

American football player (1917–1998)

No. 64
- Position: Tackle

Personal information
- Born: December 6, 1917; North Braddock, Pennsylvania, U.S.
- Died: February 3, 1998 (aged 80); Pittsburgh, Pennsylvania, U.S.
- Listed height: 6 ft 3 in (1.91 m)
- Listed weight: 225 lb (102 kg)

Career information
- High school: North Braddock (PA) Scott Township
- College: Florida
- NFL draft: 1940: 5th round, 33rd overall pick

Career history
- Pittsburgh Pirates (1940)

Awards and highlights
- Third-team All-SEC (1939)

Career NFL statistics
- Games played: 11
- Games started: 5
- Stats at Pro Football Reference

Clark William Goff (December 6, 1917 – February 3, 1998) was an American college and professional football player who was a tackle in the National Football League (NFL) for a single season in 1940. Goff played college football for the University of Florida, and thereafter, he played professionally for the NFL's Pittsburgh Pirates (now known as the Pittsburgh Steelers).

== Early life ==
He was born in North Braddock, Pennsylvania. Goff attended Scott Township High School in North Braddock.

== College career ==
Goff accepted an athletic scholarship to attend the University of Florida in Gainesville, Florida, where he played for coach Josh Cody's Florida Gators football team from 1937 to 1939. Goff was the Gators' team captain and earned third-team All-Southeastern Conference (SEC) honors during his 1939 senior season.

== Professional career ==
The Pittsburgh Pirates selected Goff in the fifth round (33rd pick overall) of the 1940 NFL draft. He played at left tackle for the Pirates during the 1940 season. During his single season with the Pirates, he played in all eleven regular season games, and started five of them.

== See also ==
- Florida Gators football, 1930–39
- List of Pittsburgh Steelers players
- List of Florida Gators in the NFL draft
- List of University of Florida alumni
