= Dick Cassiano =

American football player (1917–1980)

No. 2
- Position: Halfback

Personal information
- Born: October 7, 1917; Albany, New York, U.S.
- Died: May 14, 1980 (aged 62); Albany, New York, U.S.
- Listed height: 5 ft 11 in (1.80 m)
- Listed weight: 175 lb (79 kg)

Career information
- College: Pittsburgh (1936-1939)
- NFL draft: 1940: 6th round, 49th overall pick

Career history
- Brooklyn Dodgers (1940)

Awards and highlights
- National champion (1937); Third-team All-American (1939)

Career NFL statistics
- Rushing yards: 84
- Rushing average: 2.4
- Receptions: 2
- Receiving yards: 67
- Total touchdowns: 2
- Stats at Pro Football Reference

Richard Peter Cassiano (October 7, 1917 – May 14, 1980) was an American professional football player who was a halfback for the Brooklyn Dodgers of the National Football League (NFL). He was selected in the sixth round and later played for the Dodgers during the 1940 NFL season. He died in 1980 at an Albany hospital. Cassiano played college football for the Pittsburgh Panthers and was a member of their so-called "dream backfield" in the 1930s.
