= Sam Boyd (American football) =

American football player and coach (1914–2001)

No. 42
- Position: End

Personal information
- Born: August 12, 1914; Rockwall, Texas, U.S.
- Died: June 8, 2001 (aged 86); Granbury, Texas, U.S.
- Listed height: 6 ft 2 in (1.88 m)
- Listed weight: 190 lb (86 kg)

Career information
- High school: Cleburne (Cleburne, Texas)
- College: Baylor (1935–1938)
- NFL draft: 1939: 6th round, 41st overall pick

Career history

Playing
- Pittsburgh Pirates / Steelers (1939–1940)

Coaching
- Baylor (1950-1953) Assistant coach; Baylor (1954-1955) Ends coach; Baylor (1956-1958) Head coach

Awards and highlights
- Third-team All-American (1938); 2× First-team All-SWC (1937, 1938)

Career NFL statistics
- Receptions: 21
- Receiving yards: 423
- Receiving touchdowns: 2
- Stats at Pro Football Reference

Head coaching record
- Postseason: Bowls: 1–0 (1.000)
- Career: 15–15–1 (.500)

Sam Bradford Boyd (August 12, 1914 – June 8, 2001) was an American football player and coach. He was drafted in the sixth round of the 1939 NFL Draft. He served as the head football coach of the Baylor University from 1956 to 1958, compiling a record of 15–15–1. His 1956 squad finished a 9–2 season with a win over Tennessee in the Sugar Bowl. Boyd played college football at Baylor from 1936 to 1938 and with the Pittsburgh Steelers of the National Football League (NFL) in 1939 and 1940. Boyd served in the United States Navy for three years during World War II attaining the rank of lieutenant. In 1962, he was inducted into Baylor's Athletic Hall of Fame. Boyd died on June 8, 2001, at his home in Granbury, Texas.

== Head coaching record ==
Year	Team	Overall	Conference	Standing	Bowl/playoffs	Coaches^{#}	AP^{°}
Baylor Bears (Southwest Conference) (1956–1958)
1956	Baylor	9–2	4–2	3rd	W Sugar	11	11
1957	Baylor	3–6–1	0–5–1	7th			
1958	Baylor	3–7	1–5	7th			
Baylor:		15–15–1	5–12–1				
Total:		15–15–1					
^{#}Rankings from final Coaches Poll.; ^{°}Rankings from final AP Poll.

== See also ==
- List of NCAA major college football yearly receiving leaders
