= Walt Merrill =

American football player (1917–1953)

- Walt Merrill, 1944

No. 29
- Position: Tackle

Personal information
- Born: August 7, 1917; Andalusia, Alabama, U.S.
- Died: March 12, 1953 (aged 35); Andalusia, Alabama, U.S.
- Listed height: 6 ft 2 in (1.88 m)
- Listed weight: 217 lb (98 kg)

Career information
- High school: Andalusia
- College: Alabama (1936-1939)
- NFL draft: 1940: 5th round, 34th overall pick

Career history
- Brooklyn Dodgers (1940–1942)

Career NFL statistics
- Games played: 28
- Games started: 22
- Stats at Pro Football Reference

Walter Oliver Merrill (August 7, 1917 – March 12, 1953) was an American professional football player.

Merrill was born in 1917 in Andalusia, Alabama, and attended Andalusia High School. He played college football for the Alabama Crimson Tide from 1936 to 1939. He was a starting tackle for the East in the 1939 Shrine Game in San Francisco.

He was selected by the Brooklyn Dodgers in fifth round (34th overall pick) of the 1940 NFL draft. He played for the Dodgers from 1940 to 1942, appearing in 28 games as a tackle.

He also served in the U.S. Army during World War II and played for the 1944 Randolph Field Ramblers football team that compiled a perfect 12–0 record and was ranked No. 3 in the final AP poll.

After the war, Merrill returned home to Andalusia. He became the part owner of a building supply company in Andalusia. He died in 1953 at age 35.
