= Bob Hoffman (American football) =

American football player (1917–2005)

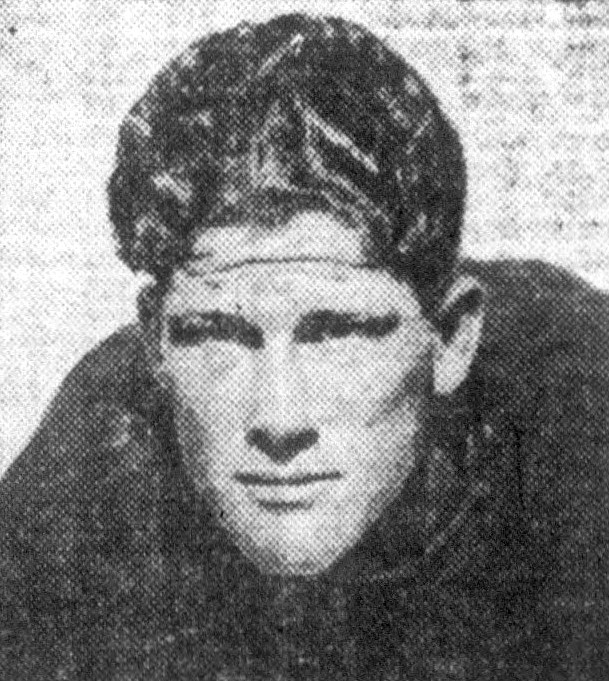
- Hoffman, circa 1942

No. 43, 45, 16, 66
- Positions: Running back, defensive back

Personal information
- Born: December 13, 1917; Star City, West Virginia, U.S.
- Died: April 13, 2005 (aged 87); Bakersfield, California, U.S.
- Listed height: 6 ft 1 in (1.85 m)
- Listed weight: 208 lb (94 kg)

Career information
- High school: Montebello (Montebello, California)
- College: USC
- NFL draft: 1940: 9th round, 78th overall pick

Career history
- Washington Redskins (1940–1941); Los Angeles Rams (1946–1948); Los Angeles Dons (1949)

Awards and highlights
- First-team All-PCC (1938); Second-team All-PCC (1939)

Career NFL statistics
- Rushing yards: 398
- Rushing average: 3.6
- Receptions: 7
- Receiving yards: 71
- Interceptions: 3
- Touchdowns: 11
- Stats at Pro Football Reference

Wayne Robert Hoffman (December 13, 1917 – April 13, 2005) was an American professional football running back in the NFL for the Washington Redskins and Los Angeles Rams. He also played in the All-America Football Conference (AAFC) for the Los Angeles Dons and in the Pacific Coast Professional Football League (PCPFL) for the Hollywood Bears. Hoffman was an All-American college football player at the University of Southern California and was selected in the ninth round of the 1940 NFL draft.

== College career ==
Hoffman played for USC as a 3-year (1937–39) letterman, he was USC's top receiver in 1938 and played in the College All-Star Game in 1939. USC went 9–2 in 1938 and in 1939, the Trojans went 8–0–2. Hoffman and the Trojans won the Rose Ball in 1938 and 1939 against Duke and Tennessee respectively. One of Hoffman's greatest highlights was when he tackled a UCLA player at the goal line to preserve a trip to the rose bowl.
