= Monk Edwards =

American football player (1920-2009)

No. 60, 66
- Positions: Center, guard, tackle

Personal information
- Born: July 9, 1920; Ireland, Texas, U.S.
- Died: May 19, 2009 (aged 88)
- Listed height: 6 ft 3 in (1.91 m)
- Listed weight: 213 lb (97 kg)

Career information
- High school: Beaumont (Beaumont, Texas)
- College: Baylor
- NFL draft: 1940: 18th round, 170th overall pick

Career history
- New York Giants (1940–1942, 1946)

Awards and highlights
- NFL 1940s All-Decade Team

Career NFL statistics
- Games played: 41
- Games started: 21
- Fumble recoveries: 1
- Stats at Pro Football Reference

William Bennett "Monk" Edwards (July 19, 1920 – May 19, 2009) was an American professional football lineman in the National Football League (NFL) for the New York Giants. He played college football at Baylor University as a fullback from 1936 to 1939 and was selected in the 18th round of the 1940 NFL draft.

== Career ==
Monk became a lawyer and served in the Federal Bureau of Investigation during World War II. He worked in the legal department for Gulf Oil from 1946 until he retired in 1976.

== Honors ==
- 1972: Baylor Bears Hall-of-Fame inductee
