= Elmer Hackney =

American football player (1916–1969)

No. 20, 34
- Position: Fullback

Personal information
- Born: July 8, 1916; Oberlin, Kansas, U.S.
- Died: May 30, 1969 (aged 52); Manhattan, Kansas, U.S.
- Listed height: 6 ft 2 in (1.88 m)
- Listed weight: 205 lb (93 kg)

Career information
- College: Kansas State
- NFL draft: 1940: 11th round, 92nd overall pick

Career history
- Philadelphia Eagles (1940); Pittsburgh Steelers (1941); Detroit Lions (1942–1946)

Awards and highlights
- First-team All-Big Six (1938); Second-team All-Big Six (1937); Kansas Sports Hall of Fame (2003)

Career NFL statistics
- Rushing yards: 846
- Rushing average: 3.8
- Receptions: 19
- Receiving yards: 135
- Total touchdowns: 12
- Stats at Pro Football Reference

Elmer Loyd Hackney (July 8, 1916 – May 30, 1969) was a professional American football running back in the National Football League (NFL). Hackney was an 11th-round selection (92nd overall pick) by the Philadelphia Eagles in the 1940 NFL draft out of Kansas State University. Hackney played one season for the Eagles (1940), the Pittsburgh Steelers (1941), and the Detroit Lions (1942–1946). He was known as the "One Man Gang," "Stinkfist," and "Iron Man".

In college, Hackney was an All-Conference back and was also twice the collegiate national champion at shot put (1938 and 1939). He set an American record of 55 feet, 11 inches, and qualified for the 1940 U.S. Olympic Team, but the Games were cancelled because of World War II.
