= John Noppenberg =

American football player (1917–2006)

No. 50, 14
- Position: Back

Personal information
- Born: September 8, 1917; Wallace, Michigan, U.S.
- Died: September 22, 2006 (aged 89); Sebring, Florida, U.S.
- Listed height: 6 ft 0 in (1.83 m)
- Listed weight: 196 lb (89 kg)

Career information
- High school: Menominee (Menominee, Michigan)
- College: Miami (FL)
- NFL draft: 1940: 13th round, 113th overall pick

Career history
- Pittsburgh Pirates/Steelers (1940–1941); Detroit Lions (1941)

Career NFL statistics
- Rushing yards: 20
- Rushing average: 1.5
- Receptions: 4
- Receiving yards: 74
- Return yards: 24
- Stats at Pro Football Reference

John Louis Noppenberg (September 8, 1917 – September 22, 2006) was an American professional football back who played two seasons for the Pittsburgh Steelers and the Detroit Lions. He was selected by the Steelers in the 13th round of the 1940 NFL draft. He played college football at the University of Miami for the Miami Hurricanes football team.
