= Bill Bailey (American football) =

American football player (1916–1990)

No. 22
- Position: End

Personal information
- Born: April 12, 1916; Thomasville, North Carolina, U.S.
- Died: April 9, 1990 (aged 73); Winston-Salem, North Carolina, U.S.
- Listed height: 6 ft 3 in (1.91 m)
- Listed weight: 213 lb (97 kg)

Career information
- High school: Lexington (NC)
- College: Duke (1935–1939)
- NFL draft: 1940: 4th round, 29th overall pick

Career history
- Brooklyn Dodgers (1940–1941)

Awards and highlights
- Second-team All-SoCon (1939)

Career NFL statistics
- Receptions: 2
- Receiving yards: 26
- Stats at Pro Football Reference

Edgar Lee "Bill" Bailey (April 12, 1916 – April 9, 1990) was an American football end.

He played college football for Duke from 1935 to 1939, including the 1938 Iron Dukes football team that was undefeated in the regular season. He later played professional football for the Brooklyn Dodgers of the National Football League (NFL) in 1940 and 1941. He appeared in 17 games for Brooklyn. He was selected in the fourth round of the 1940 NFL draft.

His football career ended with his service in the United States Navy during World War II. He also served in the Navy during the Korean War, attaining the rank of commander.

He later worked as a teacher at Lexington High School for 15 years.

Bailey and his wife Dorothy had two daughters and two sons. He died in 1990 at age 73 at North Carolina Baptist Hospital in Winston-Salem, North Carolina.
