= Sam Bartholomew =

American football player (1917–1999)

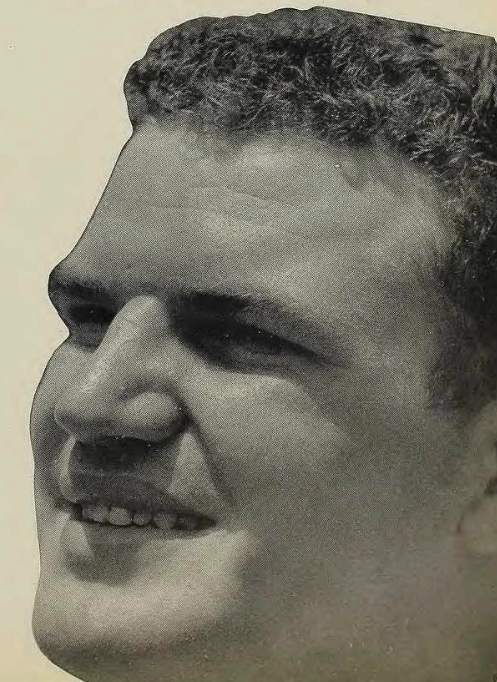
- Bartholomew from 1940 Volunteer

No. 27
- Position: Fullback

Personal information
- Born: April 10, 1917; Charleston, West Virginia, U.S.
- Died: February 14, 1999 (aged 81); Sullivan County, Tennessee, U.S.
- Listed height: 5 ft 11 in (1.80 m)
- Listed weight: 188 lb (85 kg)

Career information
- College: Tennessee
- NFL draft: 1940: 13th round, 118th overall pick

Career history
- Philadelphia Eagles (1941)

Awards and highlights
- 2× Jacobs Blocking Trophy (1938, 1939); Second-team All-SEC (1939)

Career NFL statistics
- Rushing yards: 69
- Rushing average: 3.3
- Receptions: 3
- Receiving yards: 15
- Interceptions: 1
- Stats at Pro Football Reference

Samuel Wilson Bartholomew (April 10, 1917 – February 14, 1999) was an American professional football fullback who played professionally in the National Football League (NFL) for the Philadelphia Eagles. He played college football at the University of Tennessee and was drafted in the 13th round of the 1940 NFL draft with the 118th overall pick by the Washington Redskins. He played in one season for the Eagles in 1941. Bartholomew was inducted to the Tennessee Sports Hall of Fame in 1986.
