= Petr Krištůfek =

Czech footballer (born 1971)

Personal information
- Date of birth: 23 March 1971 (age 55)

Senior career*
Years	Team	Apps	(Gls)
1995	České Budějovice	15	(0)
1996	Bohemians Praha	7	(0)
1997–1998	Atlantic Lázně Bohdaneč	4	(0)
1998–1999	Chrudim	15	(1)
Total		41	(1)
- * Club domestic league appearances and goals

Petr Krištůfek (born 23 March 1971) is a Czech former professional footballer who played for České Budějovice, Bohemians Praha, Atlantic Lázně Bohdaneč and Chrudim.
