= Joe Boyd (American football) =

American football player and evangelist (1917–2009)

Profile
- Position: Tackle

Personal information
- Born: May 5, 1917; Jacksonville, Texas, U.S.
- Died: June 1, 2009 (aged 92)

Career information
- High school: Crozier Tech (Dallas, Texas}
- College: Texas A&M University
- NFL draft: 1940: 6th round, 48th overall pick

Career history
- 1937–1939: Texas A&M

Awards and highlights
- National champion (1939); First-team All-American (1939); Third-team All-American (1938); 2× First-team All-SWC (1938, 1939)

Joe M. Boyd (May 5, 1917 – June 1, 2009) was an American football player and evangelist. Boyd attended Texas A&M University where he played at the tackle position on the undefeated national champion 1939 Texas A&M Aggies football team. He was selected by the Sporting News, Collier's Weekly magazine, the New York Sun, Boys' Life magazine, and the Collegiate Writers as a first-team player on the 1939 College Football All-America Team. After leaving Texas A&M, Boyd became an evangelist and preacher.
