= Bolo Perdue =

American football player (1916–1988)

No. 24, 57
- Positions: End, defensive end

Personal information
- Born: May 10, 1916; Thomasville, North Carolina, U.S.
- Died: March 31, 1988 (aged 71); Hampton, Virginia, U.S.
- Listed height: 5 ft 10 in (1.78 m)
- Listed weight: 170 lb (77 kg)

Career information
- College: Duke; Arkansas
- NFL draft: 1940: 16th round, 148th overall pick

Career history
- New York Giants (1940); Brooklyn Dodgers (1946)

Awards and highlights
- First-team All-SoCon (1938)

Career NFL statistics
- Receptions: 2
- Receiving yards: 28
- Stats at Pro Football Reference

Charles Willard "Bolo" Perdue (May 10, 1916 – March 31, 1988) was an American professional football end who played for processional in the National Football League (NFL) for the New York Giants and in the All-America Football Conference (AAFC) for the Brooklyn Dodgers. Born in Thomasville, North Carolina, Perdue played college football at Duke University. He was drafted 148th overall in the 16th round of the 1940 NFL draft by the Washington Redskins.
