= Si Titus =

American football player (1918–1989)

Profile
- Positions: Center, linebacker

Personal information
- Born: September 23, 1918; New York City, New York, U.S.
- Died: February 17, 1989 (aged 70); Pittsburgh, Pennsylvania, U.S.
- Listed height: 6 ft 0 in (1.83 m)
- Listed weight: 195 lb (88 kg)

Career information
- High school: Brooklyn Prep (NY)
- College: Holy Cross

Career history
- Brooklyn Dodgers (1940–1942); Pittsburgh Steelers (1945)
- Stats at Pro Football Reference

Silas John Titus (September 23, 1918 – February 17, 1989) was an American football player. He played college football for Holy Cross (1937-1939) and professional football for the Brooklyn Dodgers (1940–1942) and Pittsburgh Steelers (1945). He also served in the United States Marine Corps during World War II and was injured at the Battle of Iwo Jima.

== Early years ==
A native of New York City, Titus attended Brooklyn Prep and played college football for Holy Cross from 1937 to 1939.

== Professional football ==
Titus played professional football as a center and linebacker in the National Football League (NFL) for the Brooklyn Dodgers from 1940 to 1942. Upon his release from the Marines, he signed with the Pittsburgh Steelers in September 1945. He appeared in a total of 28 NFL games as a center. He also played at center for the Jersey City Giants of the American League in 1946.

== Military service ==
Titus served in the United States Marine Corps during World War II, reaching the rank of first lieutenant. He participated in the invasions of Roi-Namur, Saipan, Tinian, and Iwo Jima. He was one of the first Marines to land at Saipan, and was wounded at Iwo Jima. He received the Silver Star and Purple Heart for his service.

== Later years and family ==
After his football career was over, Titus owned and operated Titus Vending Corp. He later worked as a broker for Corporate Investments International.

Titus was married in 1950 to Jeannette Donahue at Sacred Heart Church in Pittsburgh. They had two sons, John and Thomas, and five daughters, Virginia, Barbara, Jeanette, Ellen, and Patti.

Titus lived in Mount Lebanon, Pennsylvania, from 1961 until his death from a heart attack in February 1989 at age 70.

Titus' brother George Titus also played for the Pittsburgh Steelers.
