= Kay Eakin =

American football player (1917–1993)

No. 12, 96
- Position: Halfback

Personal information
- Born: August 3, 1917; Atkins, Arkansas, U.S.
- Died: February 15, 1993 (aged 75); Fort Smith, Arkansas, U.S.
- Listed height: 6 ft 0 in (1.83 m)
- Listed weight: 180 lb (82 kg)

Career information
- High school: Lee (Marianna, Arkansas)
- College: Arkansas (1936-1939)
- NFL draft: 1940: 1st round, 3rd overall pick

Career history
- New York Giants (1940–1941); Miami Seahawks (1946)

Awards and highlights
- NCAA passing yards leader (1939); First-team All-SWC (1939); Second-team All-SWC (1938)

Career NFL/AAFC statistics
- Passing attempts: 107
- Passing completions: 41
- Completion percentage: 38.3%
- TD–INT: 3–12
- Passing yards: 601
- Passer rating: 27.2
- Stats at Pro Football Reference

Oliver Kay Eakin Jr. (August 3, 1917 – February 15, 1993) was an American professional football player in the National Football League (NFL) and the All-America Football Conference (AAFC). He was the third overall pick in the 1940 NFL draft.

Eakin played college football at the University of Arkansas, and was selected third overall in the first round of the 1940 NFL Draft by the Pittsburgh Steelers. He played halfback and fullback with the New York Giants in 1941 and 1942, and returned with the Miami Seahawks in 1946. In between, he served in the US Army during WWII where he rose the rank of sergeant.

== See also ==
- List of college football yearly passing leaders
