= Ed Boell =

American football player, coach, and official (1917–1998)

- Boell at NYU

Profile
- Positions: Quarterback, halfback

Personal information
- Born: March 6, 1917; Brooklyn, New York, U.S.
- Died: March 14, 1998 (age 81); Palm Beach County, Florida, U.S.

Career information
- College: NYU

Awards and highlights
- First-team All-Eastern (1939)

Edward H. Boell (March 6, 1917 - March 14, 1998) was an American football player, coach, and official.

Boell was born in Brooklyn in 1917 and attended Samuel J. Tilden High School. He then enrolled at New York University and played college football as a halfback and quarterback for the NYU Violets from 1937 to 1939. He was considered a triple-threat man in football, but later recalled: "I could throw the ball, and I could kick it. The only trouble with me was I had no speed." He was recognized as one of the best college football players in the country in 1939 and played in the 1940 East-West Shrine Game and Chicago College All-Star Game. He also played for the NYU baseball team as a right-handed pitcher, compiling a 17–7 win-loss record.

Boell was selected by the Washington Redskins in the first round (eighth overall pick) of the 1940 NFL draft. He rejected the Redskins' offer to play professional football for $200 a game and instead pursued a career as a coach and athletic director at Riverside High School on Long Island. He later coached football at Great Neck High School and was chosen by Newsday as 1944 "Coach of the Year". He resigned as football coach at Great Neck in April 1946, citing health problems with his sinus as motivation for a move to Florida.

Boell moved to Florida in 1946, where he taught and coached at Charlotte High School in Punta Gorda, and later at Palm Beach High School, and became a basketball and baseball official.

Boell was inducted into both the NYU Hall of Fame in 1976 and the Palm Beach County Sports Hall of Fame in 1980. He died in 1998 at age 81, after battling emphysema and cirrhosis of the liver.
