= Buddy Banker =

American football player

- Buddy Banker, 1938

Profile
- Position: Halfback

Personal information
- Born: May 4, 1916; Lake Charles, Louisiana, U.S.
- Died: March 31, 2006 (aged 89); Jefferson, Louisiana, U.S.

Career information
- College: Tulane

Burton John "Buddy" Banker Sr. (May 4, 1916 - March 31, 2006) was an American football player. He played college football as a halfback, both on offense and defense, for Tulane from 1937 to 1939.

== Early life ==
Banker was born in Lake Charles, Louisiana, in 1916. He attended Lake Charles High School. His older brother, Bill Banker, was an All-American halfback for Tulane in 1929.

== College football ==
Banker played college football at the halfback position for the Tulane Green Wave football teams from 1937 to 1939. In his first game for Tulane, he scored three touchdowns and gained 137 yards on eight carries, an average of 17.1 yards per carry. Between the 1937 and 1938 seasons, he grew from 156 pounds to 196 pounds. He helped lead the 1939 Tulane Green Wave football team to an undefeated regular season, the Southeastern Conference championship, and the No. 5 spot in the final AP poll. The Shreveport Journal called Banker the "unsung hero" of the 1939 team; he carried the ball 111 times for 473 yards in 1939.

== Professional football ==
Banker was selected by the Washington Redskins in the third round (23rd overall pick) of the 1940 NFL draft. He was offered a contract, but opted not to play professional football.

== Family and later years ==
Banker and his wife, Rosemary Fischer Banker, were married for 62 years. After his football career ended, he worked as a mechanical engineer. He died in 2006 at age 89 in Jefferson, Louisiana.
