= Foster Watkins =

American football player (1917–2002)

"Flippin' Foster" Watkins
- Watkins in 1938

No. 41, 39
- Positions: Quarterback, halfback

Personal information
- Born: November 17, 1917; Memphis, Texas, U.S.
- Died: December 29, 2002 (aged 85); Wichita Falls, Texas, U.S.
- Listed height: 5 ft 9 in (1.75 m)
- Listed weight: 163 lb (74 kg)

Career information
- High school: Dumas (Dumas, Texas)
- College: West Texas A&M
- NFL draft: 1939: 15th round, 134th overall pick

Career history
- Philadelphia Eagles (1940–1941)

Career NFL statistics
- TD–INT: 2-3
- Passing yards: 627
- Passer rating: 53.3
- Stats at Pro Football Reference

Foster Forrest "Flippin' Foster" Watkins (November 17, 1917 – December 29, 2002) was an American professional football player who was a quarterback in the National Football League (NFL) for the Philadelphia Eagles from 1940 to 1941. He played college football for the West Texas A&M Buffaloes. He served in World War II for the United States Navy.

== Early life ==
Watkins was born in 1917 in Memphis, Tennessee. He attended Dumas High School in Dumas, Texas.

== West Texas Teachers ==
Watkins attended West Texas State Teachers College (now West Texas A&M University). He played quarterback for the school's football teamfrom 1936 to 1939 and was selected as the most valuable player in the conference in both 1938 and 1939. He received honorable mention on the 1939 Little All-America college football team. He also played safety on defense, and played for the school's basketball team.

== Philadelphia Eagles ==
Watkins was selected by the Philadelphia Eagles in the 15th round, 134th overall pick, of the 1940 NFL draft. He played for the Eagles in 1940 and 1941. Despite playing as a backup to Davey O'Brien, who started all 11 games in 1940, Wakins ranked among the NFL leaders in 1940 with 565 passing yards (seventh) and 85 pass attempts (tenth). Watkins also played baseball for the Memphis Spudders in 1941.

== Later life ==
Watkins served in the Navy during World War II. He held the rank of lieutenant and was released from active duty in 1946. In May 1947, Watkins left a position as a high school teacher and coach to engage in farming in Memphis, Tennessee. He returned to coaching for a time, then entering private business in 1954. He was inducted into the West Texas State University Hall of Champions in 1987 and the Texas Panhandle Sports Hall of Fame in 1995.

Watkins and his wife, Patricia Ann, had two sons. Watkins died in December 2002 at age 86 in Wichita Falls, Texas.
