= Dick Favor =

American football player (1916–1991)

- Dick Favor, 1939

Profile
- Position: Back

Personal information
- Born: December 30, 1916; Crescent, Oklahoma, U.S.
- Died: January 16, 1991 (aged 74)

Career information
- College: Oklahoma

Richard E. Favor (December 30, 1916 - January 16, 1991) was an American football player.

A native of Crescent, Oklahoma, he attended Crescent High School. After high school, he spent a year working as a roughneck for the British-American Oil Company in the Oklahoma City oil field. In the fall of 1936, he enrolled at the University of Oklahoma. He played college football as a back for the Sooners during the 1938 and 1939 seasons. Considered one of the best blocking backs in the country, he led the Sooners to a 16–3–1 combined record during the 1938 and 1939 seasons. After the 1939 season, he was selected to play quarterback for the western squad in the 1940 East-West Shrine Game.

He was selected by the Philadelphia Eagles in the third round (17th overall pick) of the 1940 NFL draft. In March 1940, the Eagles traded their rights to Favor to the Cleveland Rams.

Favor was married in August 1938 to Margaret Sweeney.
