= Frank Kristufek =

American football player (1915–1998)

- Frank Kristufek, 1940

Profile
- Position: Tackle

Personal information
- Born: December 12, 1915; McKees Rock, Pennsylvania, U.S.
- Died: June 16, 1998 (age 82); Torrance, California, U.S.
- Listed height: 6 ft 0 in (1.83 m)
- Listed weight: 209 lb (95 kg)

Career information
- High school: Mckeesport (PA)
- College: Pittsburgh

Career history
- Brooklyn Dodgers (1940-1941)
- Stats at Pro Football Reference

Frank Charles Kristufek (December 12, 1915 – June 16, 1998) was an American football player.

== Early life ==
A native of McKees Rock, Pennsylvania, Kristufek attended Mckeesport High School and played college football for Pittsburgh in 1938 and 1939. He suffered from poor eyesight that made it difficult for him to see the ball-carrier soon enough to make tackles. Accordingly, in October 1939, special shatter-proof glasses were made for him. Kristufek was also a heavyweight wrestling champion while in college.

== Professional football ==
Kristufek graduated from Pitt in June 1940 and signed a contract in August 1940 to play played professional football in the National Football League (NFL) for the Brooklyn Dodgers. He rejoined Jock Sutherland who had been his coach at Pitt and took over as the Dodgers' head coach in 1940. He played for the Dodgers in 1940 and 1941, appearing in 22 NFL games as a tackle.

Kristufek quit football due to his poor vision. His weak eyes also prevented him from serving in the military during World War II. He worked in a laboratory in New Jersey during the war.

== Family and later years ==
Kristufek and his wife, Helen, had four children: William, Carol, Ruth, and Christopher. He lived for the final 50 years of his life in Torrance, California. He was employed by U.S. Steel for 33 years as a metallurgical engineer in Torrance. He died in Torrance in 1998 at age 82.
