= 1940 NFL season =

American football season

- 6th NFL guide published by Spalding

Regular season
- Duration: September 8 to December 8, 1940
- East Champions: Washington Redskins
- West Champions: Chicago Bears

Championship Game
- Champions: Chicago Bears

The 1940 NFL season was the 21st regular season of the National Football League. The ten teams of the league each played an 11 game schedule, for a total of 55 regular season games.

The season ended on December 8, when the Chicago Bears defeated the Washington Redskins in the NFL Championship Play-off Game by a score of 73–0 in front of 36,034 fans. This result still stands as the most one-sided victory (and highest score) in NFL history as of the 2025 season.

NFL teams: West, East

== Draft ==
The 1940 NFL draft was held on December 9, 1939, at Milwaukee's Schroeder Hotel. With the first pick, the Chicago Cardinals selected halfback George Cafego from the University of Tennessee. The meeting of owners was held in conjunction with the 1939 Championship Play-off, held in Milwaukee between the Green Bay Packers and the New York Giants the following day.

The draft encompassed 22 rounds and saw the selection of 200 players but only produced two future members of the Professional Football Hall of Fame — quarterback and defensive back George McAfee, taken by the Philadelphia Eagles with the second overall pick, and center and linebacker Clyde "Bulldog" Turner, picked by the Chicago Bears seventh overall.

== Major changes for 1940 ==
=== Rules changes ===
The rule requiring players removed for substitutes be ineligible for return until a subsequent quarter, with the exception of two permitted returning players in the fourth quarter, remained unchanged.

Other important changes were enacted by the NFL for its 1940 season, however. These included:

- The penalty for clipping was reduced from 25 yards to 15 yards.
- A penalty committed in the field of play could no longer carry the ball more than half the distance to the offender's goal line.
- For offensive pass interference committed in the end zone, the defense now had the option of placing the ball 15 yards from the previous spot with a loss of down, or taking the ball on the 20 yard line via touchback.
- Penalties for fouls that occur prior to a pass or kick from behind the line of scrimmage were to be enforced from the previous spot. However, penalties for fouls during a free ball or when the offensive team fouls behind their line were to be enforced from the spot of the foul.

=== Coaching changes ===
- Brooklyn Dodgers: Potsy Clark was replaced by Jock Sutherland.
- Chicago Cardinals: Ernie Nevers was replaced by Jimmy Conzelman.
- Detroit Lions: Gus Henderson was replaced by George Clark.

=== Team name changes ===
- The Pittsburgh Pirates were rebranded as the Steelers before the 1940 season.

=== Stadium changes ===
- The Detroit Lions played full time at University of Detroit Stadium, no longer splitting home games with Briggs Stadium
- The Philadelphia Eagles moved from Philadelphia Municipal Stadium to Shibe Park

== Final standings ==
The National League's Most Valuable Player of 1940 was Brooklyn Dodgers quarterback Clarence "Ace" Parker.

NFL Eastern Division
	W	L	T	PCT	DIV	PF	PA	STK
Washington Redskins	9	2	0	.818	6–2	245	142	W1
Brooklyn Dodgers	8	3	0	.727	6–2	186	120	W4
New York Giants	6	4	1	.600	5–2–1	131	133	L1
Pittsburgh Steelers	2	7	2	.222	1–6–1	60	178	L1
Philadelphia Eagles	1	10	0	.091	1–7	111	211	L1

Note: Tie games were not officially counted in the standings until 1972.

NFL Western Division
	W	L	T	PCT	DIV	PF	PA	STK
Chicago Bears	8	3	0	.727	6–2	238	152	W2
Green Bay Packers	6	4	1	.600	4–3–1	238	155	T1
Detroit Lions	5	5	1	.500	4–3–1	138	153	L1
Cleveland Rams	4	6	1	.400	2–5–1	171	191	T1
Chicago Cardinals	2	7	2	.222	2–5–1	139	222	L3

Note: Tie games were not officially counted in the standings until 1972.

== NFL Championship Play-off Game ==
Champions of the National League in 1940, the Chicago Bears.

The NFL's champion was determined with a single "Championship Play-off Game" on December 8 between the Western champion Chicago Bears and the Eastern champion Washington Redskins at Griffith Stadium in Washington, DC. A total of 36,034 fans were in attendance, generating gross gate receipts of $112,508 ($3.12 per patron). The game still stands as the greatest whitewash in the history of the NFL, with Bill Osmanski of the Bears breaking free on a 68 yard touchdown run on the third play of the game and Chicago never looking back en route to a 73–0 victory.

== Team statistics ==
Rank	Team	Total yards	(Rushing)	(Passing)	Penalized	Yards allowed	Takeaways
1	Green Bay Packers	3,400	1,604	1,796	295	2,532	38
2	Washington Redskins	3,289	1,402	1,887	427	2,847	27
3	Chicago Bears	3,219	1,818	1,401	605	2,750	38
4	Brooklyn Dodgers	2,813	1,546	1,267	285	2,836	32
5	Cleveland Rams	2,724	1,142	1,582	260	3,102	39
6	Detroit Lions	2,634	1,457	1,177	259	2,357	49
7	New York Giants	2,512	1,476	1,036	349	2,219	34
8	Chicago Cardinals	2,227	1,315	912	331	2,783	42
9	Philadelphia Eagles	2,153	298	1,855	215	2,780	25
10	Pittsburgh Steelers	1,977	1,102	875	336	2,742	23
Source: Strickler (ed.), 1941 NFL Record & Roster Manual, pp. 54-55. "Takeaways" = Interceptions + Fumble recoveries

== Individual leaders ==
=== Rushing ===
Rushing leader of 1940 was All-Pro right halfback Byron "Whizzer" White, later a Supreme Court justice.

Rank	Name	Team	Yards rushing	Attempts	Yards per carry
1	Byron "Whizzer" White	Detroit Lions	514	146	3.52
2	Johnny Drake	Cleveland Rams	480	134	3.58
3	Tuffy Leemans	New York Giants	474	132	3.59
4	Banks McFadden	Brooklyn Dodgers	411	65	6.32
5	Dick Todd	Washington Redskins	408	76	5.37
6	Clarke Hinkle	Green Bay Packers	383	109	3.51
7	Ray Nolting	Chicago Bears	373	78	4.78
8	Joe Maniaci	Chicago Bears	368	84	4.38
9	Parker "Bullet" Hall	Cleveland Rams	365	94	3.88
10	Marshall "Biggie" Goldberg	Chicago Cardinals	325	87	3.74
Source: Strickler (ed.), 1941 NFL Record & Roster Manual, pp. 56–57.

=== Receiving ===
Rookie Don Looney's 707 yards receiving topped the NFL, earning him second team All Pro honors in 1940. Looney's career was ended by the war and he returned afterwards as an NFL referee.

Rank	Name	Team	Receiving yards	Receptions	Touchdowns
1	Don Looney	Philadelphia Eagles	707	24	6
2	Don Hutson	Green Bay Packers	664	45	7
3	Dick Todd	Washington Redskins	402	20	4
4	Perry Schwartz	Brooklyn Dodgers	370	21	3
5	"Big Jim" Benton	Cleveland Rams	351	22	3
6	Jimmy Johnston	Washington Redskins	350	29	3
7	Lloyd Cardwell	Detroit Lions	349	20	1
8	Coley McDonough	Cleveland Rams	315	12	1
9	George Platukis	Pittsburgh Steelers	290	15	2
10	Les McDonald	Philadelphia Eagles	289	14	0
Source: Strickler (ed.), 1941 NFL Record & Roster Manual, pp. 60-61.

=== Passing ===
Iconic photo of Redskins stars on the bench in 1942. Star passer "Slingin' Sammy" Baugh in the center, 1940's total-yards-from-scrimmage leader fullback Dick Todd with broken nose at right.

Rank	Name	Team	Passing Yards	Complete - Attempt	Percentage	TD : INT
1	Sammy Baugh	Washington Redskins	1,367	111-for-177	62.7%	12 : 10
2	Davey O'Brien	Philadelphia Eagles	1,290	124-for-277	44.8%	5 : 17
3	Parker Hall	Cleveland Rams	1,108	77-for-183	42.1%	7 : 16
4	Cecil Isbell	Green Bay Packers	1,037	68-for-150	45.3%	8 : 12
5	Sid Luckman	Chicago Bears	941	48-for-105	45.7%	4 : 9
6	Clarence "Ace" Parker	Brooklyn Dodgers	817	49-for-111	44.1%	10 : 7
7	Foster Watkins	Philadelphia Eagles	565	28-for-85	32.9%	1 : 3
8	Arnie Herber	Green Bay Packers	560	38-for-89	42.7%	6 : 7
9	Billy Patterson	Pittsburgh Steelers	529	34-for-117	29.1%	3 : 15
10	Hugh McCullough	Chicago Cardinals	529	43-for-116	37.1%	4 : 21
Sources: Strickler (ed.), 1941 NFL Record & Roster Manual, pp. 58-59. Pro Football Reference for TD passes.

== Awards ==
=== Joe F. Carr Trophy ===
The Joe F. Carr Trophy was presented annually by the National League as its Most Valuable Player award.

- Clarence "Ace" Parker, quarterback, Brooklyn Dodgers

=== All-Professional Team ===
The "1940 All-Professional Team" was selected by National Professional Football Writers' Association. The New York Giants and Washington Redskins were each represented by four members of the 22-man squad. There were also 22 players added to an "Honorable Mention" list.

First Team		—	Second Team	
Name	Team	Position	Name	Team
Don Hutson	Green Bay Packers	LE	Don Looney	Philadelphia Eagles
Joe Stydahar	Chicago Bears	LT	Jim Barber	Washington Redskins
Danny Fortmann	Chicago Bears	LG	Steve Slivinski	Washington Redskins
Mel Hein	New York Giants	C	"Bulldog" Turner	Chicago Bears
John Wiethe	Detroit Lions	RG	Doug Oldershaw	New York Giants
"Bruiser" Kinard	Brooklyn Dodgers	RT	John Mellus	New York Giants
Perry Schwartz	Brooklyn Dodgers	RE	Jim Poole	New York Giants
"Ace" Parker	Brooklyn Dodgers	QB	Davey O'Brien	Philadelphia Eagles
Sammy Baugh	Washington Redskins	LHB	Cecil Isbell	Green Bay Packers
"Whizzer" White	Detroit Lions	RHB	Dick Todd	Washington Redskins
Johnny Drake	Cleveland Rams	FB	Clarke Hinkle	Green Bay Packers
