= 1939 Big Ten Conference football season =

- Sport: Football
- Teams: 10
- Top draft pick: Hal Van Every
- Champion: Ohio State
- Season MVP: Nile Kinnick

Football seasons
- 1938 1940

1939 Big Ten Conference football standings
	Conf.					Overall
Team	W		L		T	W		L		T
No. 15 Ohio State $	5	–	1	–	0	6	–	2	–	0
No. 9 Iowa	4	–	1	–	1	6	–	1	–	1
No. 20 Michigan	3	–	2	–	0	6	–	2	–	0
Purdue	2	–	1	–	2	3	–	3	–	2
Northwestern	3	–	2	–	1	3	–	4	–	1
Illinois	3	–	3	–	0	3	–	4	–	1
Minnesota	2	–	3	–	1	3	–	4	–	1
Indiana	2	–	3	–	0	2	–	4	–	2
Wisconsin	0	–	5	–	1	1	–	6	–	1
Chicago	0	–	3	–	0	2	–	6	–	0
$ – Conference champion; Rankings from AP Poll

The 1939 Big Ten Conference football season was the 44th season of college football played by the member schools of the Big Ten Conference (also known as the Western Conference) and was a part of the 1939 college football season.

The 1939 Big Ten football champion was Ohio State. Led by head coach Francis Schmidt, the Buckeyes compiled a 6–2 record, outscored opponents outscored 189 to 64, and were ranked No. 15 in the final AP Poll. End Esco Sarkkinen was a consensus first-team All-American, and quarterback Don Scott was selected as a first-team All-American by one selector. Center Steve Andrako was selected as Ohio State's most valuable player.

Iowa compiled a 6-1-1 record, finished in second place in the Big Ten, and was ranked No. 9 in the final AP Poll. Halfback Nile Kinnick was a consensus first-team All-American and won both the Heisman Trophy and the Chicago Tribune Silver Football trophy. End Erwin Prasse and tackle Mike Enich also won first-team All-Big Ten honors.

Michigan compiled a 6–2 record, led the conference in scoring offense (27.4 points per game), and was ranked No. 20 in the final AP Poll. Halfback Tom Harmon rushed for 884 yards and passed for another 583 yards; he was a consensus first-team All-American and finished second in the voting for both Heisman Trophy.

== Season overview ==
=== Results and team statistics ===
Conf. Rank	Team	Head coach	AP final	AP high	Overall record	Conf. record	PPG	PAG	MVP
1	Ohio State	Francis Schmidt	#15	#4	6–2	5–1	23.6	8.0	Steve Andrako
2	Iowa	Eddie Anderson	#9	#8	6-1-1	4-1-1	16.3	11.4	Nile Kinnick
3	Michigan	Fritz Crisler	#20	#2	6–2	3–2	27.4	11.8	Tom Harmon
4	Purdue	Mal Elward	NR	NR	3–3–2	2–1–2	7.0	6.6	Frank Bykowski
5	Northwestern	Pappy Waldorf	NR	NR	3–4–1	3–2–1	5.9	8.4	Jack Haman
6	Illinois	Robert Zuppke	NR	NR	3–4–1	3–3	9.4	9.3	Bill Lenich
7	Minnesota	Bernie Bierman	NR	#20	3–4–1	2–3–1	19.3	10.3	Hal Van Every
8	Indiana	Bo McMillin	NR	NR	2–4–2	2–3	8.8	12.0	James Logan
9	Wisconsin	Harry Stuhldreher	NR	NR	1–6–1	0–5–1	6.8	14.1	George Paskvan
10	Chicago	Clark Shaughnessy	NR	NR	2–6	0–3	4.6	38.5	Hobert Wasam

Key
PPG = Average of points scored per game
PAG = Average of points allowed per game
MVP = Most valuable player as voted by players on each team as part of the voting process to determine the winner of the Chicago Tribune Silver Football trophy

=== Regular season ===
==== September 30 ====
On September 30, 1939, seven of the Big Ten football teams opened their seasons with non-conference games. The games resulted in three wins, two ties and two losses. Michigan, Ohio State, and Northwestern had bye weeks.

- Iowa 41, South Dakota 0
- Wisconsin 14, Marquette 13
- Minnesota 62, Arizona 0
- Notre Dame 3, Purdue 0
- Illinois 0, Bradley 0
- Beloit 6, Chicago 0
- Indiana 7, Nebraska 7

==== October 7 ====
On October 7, 1939, the Big Ten teams played one conference game and six non-conference games. The non-conference games ended in three wins and three losses. Illinois and Purdue had bye weeks.

- Ohio State 19, Missouri 0
- Iowa 32, Indiana 29
- Michigan 26, Michigan State 13. Michigan defeated Michigan State, 26–13, before 68,618 spectators at Michigan Stadium in Ann Arbor, Michigan. Michigan's touchdowns were scored by Paul Kromer, Tom Harmon, and Forest Evashevski (two touchdown passes from Harmon).
- Texas 17, Wisconsin 7
- Nebraska 6, Minnesota 0
- Chicago 12, Wabash 2
- Oklahoma 23, Northwestern 0

==== October 14 ====
On October 14, 1939, the Big Ten football teams played four conference games and two non-conference games. The non-conference games both resulted in losses.

- Ohio State 13, Northwestern 0
- Michigan 27, Iowa 7. Michigan defeated Iowa, 27–7, before a crowd of 27,512 at Michigan Stadium. Iowa scored first on a touchdown pass from Nile Kinnick to Floyd Dean that covered 70 yards. Tom Harmon scored all 27 points for Michigan on four touchdowns and three extra point kicks. Harmon's final touchdown came on a 90-yard interception return in the third quarter.
- Indiana 14, Wisconsin 0
- Minnesota 13, Purdue 13
- Harvard 61, Chicago 0
- USC 26, Illinois 0

==== October 21 ====
On October 21, 1939, the Big Ten football teams played four conference games and one non-conference game. The non-conference game ended in a win. Iowa had a bye week.

- Ohio State 23, Minnesota 20
- Michigan 85, Chicago 0. Michigan defeated Chicago, 85–0, at Stagg Field in Chicago. Tom Harmon scored two touchdowns on runs of 57 and 41 yards, threw two touchdown passes (to Forest Evashevski and Bob Westfall), and kicked three PATs and one field goal. Westfall and Dave Strong also scored two touchdowns each. Michigan's offense finished with 461 net yards and was so dominant that it registered more touchdowns (12) than first downs (11). Despite Michigan's extensive use of reserves through most of the game, Michigan's 85 points was the highest total by a Michigan team since Fielding H. Yost's Point-a-Minute teams and the worst defeat in the history of the Chicago Maroons football program. The Chicago Tribune found no fault with Michigan for running up the score, noting that the first string played only 20 minutes, and adding: "You can't expect a young man with a clear field before him to pause and tie his shoelaces or pass the time of day with a Maroon."
- Northwestern 13, Wisconsin 7
- Purdue 20, Michigan State 7
- Indiana 7, Illinois 6

==== October 28 ====
On October 28, 1939, the Big Ten teams played three conference games and three non-conference games. The non-conference games ended in one win and two losses. Minnesota had a bye week.

- Cornell 23, Ohio State 14
- Iowa 19, Wisconsin 13
- Michigan 27, Yale 7. Michigan defeated Yale, 27–7, at Michigan Stadium. Tom Harmon scored three touchdowns and kicked three extra points for Michigan. Paul Kromer scored Michigan's other touchdown. Michigan had 353 rushing yards to 35 for Yale.
- Iowa 19, Wisconsin 13
- Santa Clara 13, Purdue 6
- Northwestern 13, Illinois 0

==== November 4 ====
On November 4, 1939, the Big Ten football teams played four conference games and one non-conference game. The non-conference game was a loss. Wisconsin had a bye week.

- Ohio State 24, Indiana 0
- Iowa 4, Purdue 0
- Illinois 16, Michigan 7. Michigan (ranked No. 2 in the AP Poll) lost to Illinois, 16–7, at Memorial Stadium in Champaign, Illinois. Michigan outgained Illinois 112 to 98 on the ground and 99 to 77 in the air. However, Michigan gave up eight turnovers on three interceptions and five fumbles, including three fumbles by Fred Trosko. Michigan's only points came on a 49-yard touchdown pass from Dave Strong to Tom Harmon with Strong running for the extra point after Harmon's kick was blocked.
- Northwestern 14, Minnesota 7
- Virginia 47, Chicago 0

==== November 11 ====
On November 11, 1939, the Big Ten football teams played four conference games and two non-conference games. The non-conference games resulted in one loss and one win.

- Ohio State 61, Chicago 0
- Iowa 7, Notre Dame 6
- Minnesota 20, Michigan 7. Michigan lost its second consecutive game, falling by a 20 to 7 score to Minnesota. Minnesota jumped to a 20 to 0 lead with touchdowns in the first, third and fourth quarters. Minnesota's touchdown in the third quarter came on a 59-yard run by halfback George Franck. In the fourth quarter, Michigan finally scored on touchdown pass from Tom Harmon to Paul Kromer.
- Illinois 7, Wisconsin 0
- Purdue 3, Northwestern 0
- Fordham 13, Indiana 0

==== November 18 ====
On November 18, 1939, the Big Ten football teams played three conference games and four non-conference games. The non-conference games resulted in three wins and one loss.

- Ohio State 21, Illinois 0
- Iowa 13, Minnesota 9
- Michigan 19, Penn 17. Michigan defeated Penn, 19–17, at Franklin Field in Philadelphia. Tom Harmon scored two of Michigan's touchdowns, including a 63-yard touchdown run early in the third quarter, returned a punt for 40 yards, threw a 30-yard pass to Ed Czak for Michigan's third touchdown, and was successful on one of three kicks for extra point. Harmon gained 202 yards from scrimmage and an overall total of 294 yards, including passes and punt and kickoff returns. Frank Reagan of Penn totaled 356 yards, including 188 yards passing. Michigan center Archie Kodros played all 60 minutes for Michigan.
- Purdue 7, Wisconsin 7
- Chicago 25, Oberlin 0
- Indiana 7, Michigan State 7
- Notre Dame 7, Northwestern 0

==== November 25 ====
On November 25, 1939, the Big Ten football teams played five conference games.

- Michigan 21, Ohio State 14. Michigan defeated Ohio State, 21–14, at Michigan Stadium. Ohio State took a 14 to 0 lead in the first 11 minutes of the game on two touchdown passes thrown by Don Scott. Michigan rallied with touchdowns in each of the second, third and fourth quarters. Michigan's touchdowns were scored by Forest Evashevski (pass from Tom Harmon), Tom Harmon and Fred Trosko (on a fake field goal).
- Iowa 7, Northwestern 7
- Minnesota 23, Wisconsin 6
- Purdue 7, Indiana 6
- Illinois 46, Chicago 0. Chicago's last football game as a member of the Big Ten Conference was a shutout loss at home to conclude a third-straight season without a league victory. The Maroons would announce they were dropping football a month later.

=== Bowl games ===
No Big Ten teams participated in any bowl games during the 1939 season. The Big Ten had a ban on postseason games and a rule requiring all football games to be completed on the Saturday before Thanksgiving.

== All-Big Ten players ==
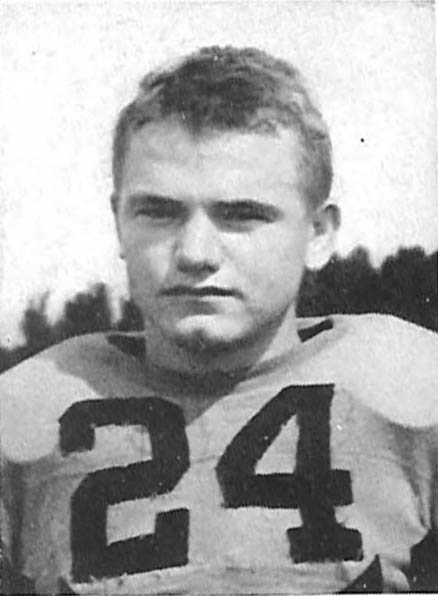
1939 Heisman Trophy winner Nile Kinnick of Iowa

The following players were picked by the Associated Press (AP) and/or the United Press (UP) as first-team players on the 1939 All-Big Ten Conference football team.

- Esco Sarkkinen, end, Ohio State (AP, UP)
- Dave Rankin, end, Purdue (UP)
- Erwin Prasse, end, Iowa (AP)
- Jim Reeder, tackle, Illinois (AP, UP)
- Mike Enich, tackle, Iowa (UP)
- Win Pedersen, tackle, Minnesota (AP)
- Hal Method, guard, Northwestern (AP, UP)
- Frank Bykowski, guard, Purdue (UP)
- Vic Marino, guard, Ohio State (AP)
- Jack Haman, center, Northwestern (AP, UP)
- Don Scott, quarterback, Ohio State (AP, UP)
- Tom Harmon, halfback, Michigan (AP, UP) (1940 Heisman Trophy winner)
- Nile Kinnick, halfback, Iowa (AP, UP) (1939 Heisman Trophy winner)
- George Paskvan, fullback, Wisconsin (AP, UP)

== All-Americans ==
Three Big Ten players were consensus first-team All-Americans as follows:

- Esco Sarkkinen, end, Ohio State (AAB, CO, NEA, NW, UP, CP, NYS, WC)
- Tom Harmon, halfback, Michigan (AAB, AP, UP, CO, INS, NW, LIB, SN, BL, CP, CW, LIFE, NYS, WC)
- Nile Kinnick, halfback, Iowa (AAB, AP, UP, CO, INS, NEA, NW, SN, BL, CP, CW, NYS, WC)

Other Big Ten players selected as a first-team All-American by at least one selector were:

- Dave Rankin, end, Purdue (LIB)
- Jim Reeder, tackle, Illinois (AAB, WC)
- Jack Haman, center, Northwestern (INS, NW, SN, UP, BL, CW)
- Archie Kodros, center, Michigan (LIFE)
- Don Scott, quarterback, Ohio State (LIB)

== 1940 NFL draft ==
The following Big Ten players were selected in the first 10 rounds of the 1940 NFL draft:

Name	Position	Team	Round	Overall pick
Hal Van Every	Halfback	Minnesota	1	9
Nile Kinnick	Halfback	Iowa	2	14
Jack Haman	Center	Northwestern	3	20
Lou Brock	Back	Purdue	3	24
Marty Christiansen	Back	Minnesota	5	31
Esco Sarkkinen	End	Ohio State	5	39
Frank Bykowski	Guard	Purdue	6	42
Jack Murray	Center	Wisconsin	6	44
Frank Zadworney	Back	Ohio State	8	64
Win Pedersen	Tackle	Minnesota	8	70
Leon DeWitte	Back	Purdue	10	86
Jack Brown	Back	Purdue	10	89
