= 1939 Ohio State Buckeyes football team =

American college football season

1939 Ohio State Buckeyes football

Big Ten champion
- Conference: Big Ten Conference

Ranking
- AP: No. 15
- Record: 6–2 (5–1 Big Ten)
- Head coach: Francis Schmidt (6th season)
- MVP: Steve Andrako
- Home stadium: Ohio Stadium

1939 Big Ten Conference football standings
	Conf.					Overall
Team	W		L		T	W		L		T
No. 15 Ohio State $	5	–	1	–	0	6	–	2	–	0
No. 9 Iowa	4	–	1	–	1	6	–	1	–	1
No. 20 Michigan	3	–	2	–	0	6	–	2	–	0
Purdue	2	–	1	–	2	3	–	3	–	2
Northwestern	3	–	2	–	1	3	–	4	–	1
Illinois	3	–	3	–	0	3	–	4	–	1
Minnesota	2	–	3	–	1	3	–	4	–	1
Indiana	2	–	3	–	0	2	–	4	–	2
Wisconsin	0	–	5	–	1	1	–	6	–	1
Chicago	0	–	3	–	0	2	–	6	–	0
$ – Conference champion; Rankings from AP Poll

The 1939 Ohio State Buckeyes football team was an American football team that represented Ohio State University in the 1939 Big Ten Conference football season. In their sixth year under head coach Francis Schmidt, the Buckeyes compiled a 6–2 record (5–1 against conference opponents), won the Big Ten Conference championship, and outscored opponents by a total of 189 to 64.

Ohio State was ranked at No. 15 in the final AP poll and at No. 5 in the final Litkenhous Ratings.

Ohio State end Esco Sarkkinen was a consensus pick on the 1939 All-America college football team. Six Ohio State players received honors from the Associated Press (AP) and/or United Press (UP) on the 1939 All-Big Ten Conference football team. The honorees were: Sarkkinen (AP-1, UP-1); quarterback Don Scott (AP-1, UP-1); guard Vic Marino (AP-1); center Steve Andrako (AP-2); halfback Jim Strausbaugh (AP-2); and fullback Jim Langhurst (AP-2).

The Buckeyes played their home games at Ohio Stadium in Columbus, Ohio.

== Schedule ==
Date	Opponent	Rank	Site	Result	Attendance	Source
October 7	Missouri*		Ohio Stadium; Columbus, OH	W 19–0	58,165	
October 14	Northwestern		Ohio Stadium; Columbus, OH	W 13–0	55,622	
October 21	at Minnesota	No. 10	Memorial Stadium; Minneapolis, MN	W 23–20	52,000	
October 28	No. 7 Cornell*	No. 4	Ohio Stadium; Columbus, OH	L 14–23	49,583	
November 4	Indiana	No. 14	Ohio Stadium; Columbus, OH	W 24–0	40,872	
November 11	at Chicago	No. 9	Stagg Field; Chicago, IL	W 61–0	2,000	
November 18	Illinois	No. 8	Ohio Stadium; Columbus, OH (Illibuck)	W 21–0	46,643	
November 25	at Michigan	No. 6	Michigan Stadium; Ann Arbor, MI (rivalry)	L 14–21	80,227	
*Non-conference game; Rankings from AP Poll released prior to the game

== Coaching staff ==
- Francis Schmidt, head coach, sixth year

== 1940 NFL draftees ==
Player	Round	Pick	Position	NFL club
Esco Sarkkinen	5	39	End	Green Bay Packers
Frank Zadworney	8	64	Halfback	Brooklyn Dodgers
Steve Andrako	17	158	Center	Washington Redskins
