= 1939 Michigan Wolverines football team =

American college football season

1939 Michigan Wolverines football
- Conference: Big Ten Conference

Ranking
- AP: No. 20
- Record: 6–2 (3–2 Big Ten)
- Head coach: Fritz Crisler (2nd season)
- Offensive scheme: Single-wing
- MVP: Tom Harmon
- Captain: Archie Kodros
- Home stadium: Michigan Stadium

1939 Big Ten Conference football standings
	Conf.					Overall
Team	W		L		T	W		L		T
No. 15 Ohio State $	5	–	1	–	0	6	–	2	–	0
No. 9 Iowa	4	–	1	–	1	6	–	1	–	1
No. 20 Michigan	3	–	2	–	0	6	–	2	–	0
Purdue	2	–	1	–	2	3	–	3	–	2
Northwestern	3	–	2	–	1	3	–	4	–	1
Illinois	3	–	3	–	0	3	–	4	–	1
Minnesota	2	–	3	–	1	3	–	4	–	1
Indiana	2	–	3	–	0	2	–	4	–	2
Wisconsin	0	–	5	–	1	1	–	6	–	1
Chicago	0	–	3	–	0	2	–	6	–	0
$ – Conference champion; Rankings from AP Poll

The 1939 Michigan Wolverines football team represented the University of Michigan in the 1939 Big Ten Conference football season. Under second-year head coach Fritz Crisler, Michigan compiled a 6–2 record and outscored opponents 219 to 94. The team was ranked No. 2 in the AP Poll after winning its first four games by a combined score of 165 to 27, but lost its fifth and sixth games to Illinois and Minnesota. After winning its final two games, the Wolverines finished the season ranked No. 20 in the final AP Poll. In the post-season rankings by Frank Dickinson, the University of Illinois professor who developed the Dickinson System, Michigan ranked seventh in the country.

Michigan's junior halfback Tom Harmon was selected as the team's Most Valuable Player after leading the team with 102 points on 14 touchdowns, 15 kicks for point after touchdown (PAT) and one field goal. Harmon was also named a consensus All-American and a first-team All-Big Ten Conference player and finished second behind Nile Kinnick in the voting for both the Heisman Trophy and the Chicago Tribune Silver Football trophy.

Junior quarterback Forest Evashevski was the team second leading scorer with 25 points and was selected as a first-team All-Big Ten player. Senior center, Archie Kodros, was the team captain.

== Schedule ==
Date	Opponent	Rank	Site	Result	Attendance
October 7	Michigan State*		Michigan Stadium; Ann Arbor, MI (rivalry)	W 26–13	68,975
October 14	Iowa		Michigan Stadium; Ann Arbor, MI	W 27–7	28,248
October 21	at Chicago	No. 6	Stagg Field; Chicago, IL (rivalry)	W 85–0	5,135
October 28	Yale*^{†}	No. 3	Michigan Stadium; Ann Arbor, MI	W 27–7	54,480
November 4	at Illinois	No. 2	Memorial Stadium; Champaign, IL (rivalry)	L 7–16	30,654
November 11	Minnesota	No. 10	Michigan Stadium; Ann Arbor, MI (Little Brown Jug)	L 7–20	66,572
November 18	at Penn*		Franklin Field; Philadelphia, PA	W 19–17	39,510
November 25	No. 6 Ohio State		Michigan Stadium; Ann Arbor, MI (rivalry)	W 21–14	78,815
*Non-conference game; ^{†}Homecoming; Rankings from AP Poll released prior to the game

== Rankings ==
Ranking movements Legend: ██ Increase in ranking ██ Decrease in ranking — = Not ranked ( ) = First-place votes
	Week								
Poll	1	2	3	4	5	6	7	8	Final
AP	6 (10)	3 (8)	2 (20)	10	—	—	15	—	20

== Season summary ==
=== Pre-season ===
During the 1938 season, Michigan compiled a 6–1–1 (3–1–1 Big Ten) record and a No. 16 ranking in its first season under head coach Fritz Crisler. Three players from the 1938 team, Ralph Heikkinen, Jack Brennan and Norm Purucker, were on rosters of National Football League teams when the 1939 season began, though Purucker was released before appearing in any regular season games.

The 1939 team returned the core of its 1938 backfield, including quarterback Forest Evashevski and halfbacks Tom Harmon and Paul Kromer, who had become known in 1938 as the "Touchdown Twins". On the line, the Wolverines returned their starting center Archie Kodros, who had been selected as the 1939 team captain at the close of the 1938 season. However, the Wolverines lost all four of their starting tackles and guards, including All-American guard Ralph Heikkinen. Before the season began, the Associated Press opined that Michigan, "apparently with plenty of backfield speed and power, will be hard to stop if Coach Fritz Crisler can mold a good line."

One week before the season started, Irving Kane Pond, the man who in 1879 scored the first touchdown in Michigan football history and later became a renowned architect, died in Washington, D.C.

=== Week 1: Michigan State ===
Week 1: Michigan State at Michigan

Team	1	2	3	4	Total
Michigan State	0	0	7	6	13
• Michigan	7	19	0	0	26

- Date: October 7, 1939
- Location: Michigan Stadium
  Ann Arbor, MI
- Game attendance: 68,618
- Referee: Lyle Clarno (Bradley)

On October 7, 1939, Michigan opened its season with a 26 to 13 victory over Charlie Bachman's Michigan State team. The game, the 34th played between the two programs, was played at Michigan Stadium before 68,618 spectators that The New York Times called "a howling throng."

Michigan took a 26 to 0 lead at halftime. The Wolverines' first points came on three-yard run around the right end by Paul Kromer, with blocking by Tom Harmon and Forest Evashevski, capping a 65-yard touchdown drive. On the opening play of the second quarter, Harmon scored on a two-yard run, capping a drive that started at Michigan State's 33-yard line. On the ensuing Michigan State drive, Archie Kodros intercepted a pass at the Spartans' 20-yard line, and after a 15-yard penalty was assessed, Michigan took over on the five-yard line. From there, Harmon threw a touchdown pass to Evashevski. Michigan's final score followed a second interception by Kodros, with Kodros catching the ball at the 45-yard line and returning it 17 yards to the 28-yard line. On fourth down from the four-yard line, Harmon threw his second touchdown pass to Evashevski. In the third quarter, Bill Batchelor of Michigan State intercepted a pass and returned it 25 yards for a touchdown. In the fourth quarter, the Spartans scored again on a 71-yard pass play from Bill Kennedy to Wyman Davis. Harmon and William Melzow each kicked one point after touchdown (PAT) in the game.

Michigan's starting lineup against Michigan State was Ed Frutig (left end), Roland Savilla (left tackle), Ralph Fritz (left guard), Kodros (center), Milo Sukup (right guard), William Smith (right tackle), John Nicholson (right end), Evashevski (quarterback), Kromer (left halfback), Harmon (right halfback), and Bob Westfall (fullback).

=== Week 2: Iowa ===
Week 2: Iowa at Michigan

Team	1	2	3	4	Total
Iowa	7	0	0	0	7
• Michigan	7	13	7	0	27

- Date: October 14, 1939
- Location: Michigan Stadium
  Ann Arbor, MI
- Game attendance: 27,512
- Referee: John Getchell (St. Thomas)

On October 14, 1939, Michigan defeated Iowa by a 27 to 7 score. The game, the 10th played between the two programs, with Michigan having compiled a 6-2-1 record in the prior nine games. The game was played before a crowd of 27,512.

Iowa scored first on a touchdown pass from Nile Kinnick (1939 Heisman Trophy winner) to Floyd Dean that covered 70 yards. Tom Harmon scored all 27 points for Michigan on four touchdowns and three kicks for PAT. Michigan's first touchdown was set up by a fumbled punt recovered by Roland Savilla and a 27-yard pass from Harmon to Ed Frutig with Harmon then running the final two yards for touchdown. Harmon's second touchdown was set up by a 39-yard punt return by Fred Trosko. Harmon's third touchdown was set up by a blocked Iowa punt recovered on Iowa's 37-yard line. Harmon's final touchdown came on a 90-yard interception return in the third quarter.

Michigan's starting lineup against Iowa was Ed Frutig (left end), Roland Savilla (left tackle), Ralph Fritz (left guard), Kodros (center), Milo Sukup (right guard), William Smith (right tackle), Joe Rogers (right end), Evashevski (quarterback), Fred Trosko (left halfback), Harmon (right halfback), and Bob Westfall (fullback).

=== Week 3: at Chicago ===
Week 3: Michigan at Chicago

Team	1	2	3	4	Total
• Michigan	21	34	6	24	85
Chicago	0	0	0	0	0

- Date: October 21, 1939
- Location: Stagg Field
  Chicago
- Referee: Frank Birch

On October 21, 1939, Michigan defeated Chicago by an 85 to 0 score. The game was the 26th and final match in the Chicago–Michigan football rivalry. What had once become a fierce rivalry had become a one-sided affair after the departure of Chicago coach Amos Alonzo Stagg.

Tom Harmon scored two touchdowns on runs of 57 and 41 yards, threw two touchdown passes (to Forest Evashevski and Bob Westfall), and kicked three PATs and one field goal. Westfall and Dave Strong each scored two touchdowns, and the remaining touchdowns were scored by Bob Zimmerman, Hercules Renda, Ed Czak, Fred Trosko, and David M. Nelson (on a 55-yard punt return). In addition to Harmon's three PATs, additional PATs were kicked by William Melzow (4), James Grissen, Evashevski and Trosko.

Michigan's offense finished with 461 net yards and was so dominant that it registered more touchdowns (12) than first downs (11). Despite Michigan's extensive use of reserves through most of the game, Michigan's 85 points was the highest total by a Michigan team since Fielding H. Yost's Point-a-Minute teams and the worst defeat in the history of the Chicago Maroons football program. The Chicago Tribune found no fault with Michigan for running up the score, noting that the first string played only 20 minutes, and adding: "You can't expect a young man with a clear field before him to pause and tie his shoelaces or pass the time of day with a Maroon."

Michigan's starting lineup against Chicago was Czak (left end), George Ostroot (left tackle), Fred Olds (left guard), Don Ingalls (center), Milo Sukup (right guard), William Smith (right tackle), Harlin Fraumann (right end), Harry Kohl (quarterback), Renda (left halfback), Norm Call (right halfback), and Zimmerman (fullback).

=== Week 4: Yale ===
Week 4: Yale at Michigan

Team	1	2	3	4	Total
Yale	0	0	0	7	7
• Michigan	7	14	6	0	27

- Date: October 28, 1939
- Location: Michigan Stadium
  Ann Arbor, MI
- Referee: John Schommer (Chicago)

On October 28, 1939, Michigan defeated Yale by a 27 to 7 score in the fourth and final played game, dating back to 1881, between the two programs. Michigan had compiled a 1-2 record in the prior three games.

Tom Harmon scored three touchdowns and kicked three PATs for Michigan. Paul Kromer scored Michigan's other touchdown. Michigan had 353 rushing yards to 35 for Yale. After scoring 21 points against Yale, Harmon was the leading scorer in the country with 73 points.

Michigan's starting lineup against Yale was Ed Frutig (left end), Roland Savilla (left tackle), Ralph Fritz (left guard), Kodros (center), Milo Sukup (right guard), William Smith (right tackle), John Nicholson (right end), Forest Evashevski (quarterback), Kromer (left halfback), Harmon (right halfback), and Bob Westfall (fullback).

=== Week 5: at Illinois ===
Week 5: Michigan at Illinois

Team	1	2	3	4	Total
Michigan	0	7	0	0	7
• Illinois	0	9	0	7	16

- Date: November 4, 1939
- Location: Memorial Stadium
  Champaign, IL
- Game attendance: 31,025
- Referee: James Masker (Northwestern)

On November 4, 1939, Michigan played Illinois at Memorial Stadium in Champaign, Illinois. The game was the 25th meeting between the two programs with Michigan having won in 1937 and 1938. Michigan came into the game ranked #2 in the AP Poll, but lost to Illinois, which was 0-4 to that point in the season, by a 16 to 7 score. The Chicago Tribune wrote of Illinois that "a football season that began dismally reached a hysterical climax."

Michigan outgained Illinois 112 to 98 on the ground and 99 to 77 in the air. However, Michigan gave up eight turnovers on three interceptions and five fumbles, including three fumbles by Fred Trosko. Michigan's only points came on a 49-yard touchdown pass from Dave Strong to Tom Harmon with Strong running for the PAT after Harmon's kick was blocked.

Michigan's starting lineup against Illinois was Ed Frutig (left end), Roland Savilla (left tackle), Ralph Fritz (left guard), Archie Kodros (center), Milo Sukup (right guard), William Smith (right tackle), John Nicholson (right end), Forest Evashevski (quarterback), Trosko (left halfback), Harmon (right halfback), and Bob Westfall (fullback).

=== Week 6: Minnesota ===
Week 6: Minnesota at Michigan

Team	1	2	3	4	Total
• Minnesota	7	0	6	7	20
Michigan	0	0	0	7	7

- Date: November 11, 1939
- Location: Michigan Stadium
  Ann Arbor, MI
- Game attendance: 64,945
- Referee: Frank Lane (Detroit)

On November 11, 1939, Michigan lost its second consecutive game, falling by a 20 to 7 score to a Minnesota squad that came into the game with three losses and no victories against a Big Ten opponent. The game was the 30th between the programs, with Minnesota having won the previous five games under head coach Bernie Bierman. T

Minnesota jumped to a 20 to 0 lead with touchdowns in the first, third and fourth quarters. Minnesota's touchdown in the third quarter came on a 59-yard run by halfback George Franck. In the fourth quarter, Michigan finally scored on touchdown pass from Tom Harmon to Paul Kromer. Harmon kicked for the PAT.

Michigan's starting lineup against Minnesota was Joe Rogers (left end), Roland Savilla (left tackle), Ralph Fritz (left guard), Archie Kodros (center), Milo Sukup (right guard), William Smith (right tackle), John Nicholson (right end), Ingalls (quarterback), Paul Kromer (left halfback), Harmon (right halfback), and Bob Westfall (fullback).

=== Week 7: at Penn ===
Week 7: Michigan at Penn

Team	1	2	3	4	Total
• Michigan	0	7	6	6	19
Penn	0	3	7	7	17

- Date: November 18, 1939
- Location: Franklin Field
  Philadelphia
- Game attendance: 55,000
- Referee: H. C. Dayhoff (Bucknell)

On November 18, 1939, Michigan defeated Penn by a 19 to 17 score at Franklin Field in Philadelphia. The game was the 16th meeting between the two programs.

Tom Harmon scored two of Michigan's touchdowns, including a 63-yard touchdown run early in the third quarter, returned a punt for 40 yards, threw a 30-yard pass to Ed Czak for Michigan's third touchdown, and was successful on one of three kicks for PAT. Harmon gained 202 yards from scrimmage and an overall total of 294 yards, including passes and punt and kickoff returns. Frank Reagan of Penn totaled 356 yards, including 188 yards passing. Michigan center Archie Kodros played all 60 minutes for Michigan.

Michigan's starting lineup against Penn was Joe Rogers (left end), Roland Savilla (left tackle), Ralph Fritz (left guard), Kodros (center), Milo Sukup (right guard), William Smith (right tackle), John Nicholson (right end), Evashevski (quarterback), Trosko (left halfback), Harmon (right halfback), and Bob Westfall (fullback).

=== Week 8: Ohio State ===
Week 8: Ohio State at Michigan

Team	1	2	3	4	Total
Ohio State	14	0	0	0	14
• Michigan	0	7	7	7	21

- Date: November 25, 1939
- Location: Michigan Stadium
  Ann Arbor, MI
- Referee: James Masker (Northwestern)

On November 25, 1939, Michigan defeated Francis Schmidt's Ohio State Buckeyes by a 21 to 14 score. The game was the 36th meeting in the Michigan–Ohio State football rivalry. After Schmidt's teams had won four straight games from 1934 to 1937, the Wolverines had defeated the Buckeyes in 1938 in Michigan's first year under Fritz Crisler. Despite the loss, Ohio State won its first Big Ten championship since 1920.

Ohio State took a 14 to 0 lead in the first 11 minutes of the game on two touchdown passes thrown by Don Scott. Michigan rallied with touchdowns in each of the second, third and fourth quarters. Michigan's touchdowns were scored by Forest Evashevski, Tom Harmon and Fred Trosko. The first Michigan touchdown was set up by a 49-yard gain on a pass from Harmon to Joe Rogers and was capped by a touchdown pass from Harmon to Evashevski. The second touchdown was set up when Ralph Fritz recovered a Don Scott fumble at the Ohio State 35-yard line. The game-winning touchdown was scored with 50 seconds left in the game and followed an Ohio State fumble recovered by Bob Westfall at the Buckeyes' 38-yard line. After being stopped at the 24-yard line, Michigan lined up for a field goal attempt with Trosko holding and Harmon set to kick. Harmon faked the kick, and Trosko, who had thrown two interceptions and fumbled earlier in the game, picked up the ball and ran for a touchdown with Harmon blocking ahead of him. Harmon also kicked all three PATs for Michigan.

Michigan's starting lineup against Ohio State was Joe Rogers (left end), Roland Savilla (left tackle), Ralph Fritz (left guard), Kodros (center), Milo Sukup (right guard), William Smith (right tackle), John Nicholson (right end), Evashevski (quarterback), Trosko (left halfback), Harmon (right halfback), and Bob Westfall (fullback).

=== Post-season ===
In the post-season rankings by Frank Dickinson, the University of Illinois professor who developed the Dickinson System for determining college football's national championship, USC ranked first with 25.73 points, and Michigan ranked seventh with 22.5 points. In the final AP Poll, Texas A&M was ranked No. 1, and the Wolverines were ranked No. 20.

With respect to individual honors, halfback Tom Harmon was Michigan's most decorated player in 1939. Harmon was selected as Michigan's Most Valuable Player, a consensus first-team All-American, and a first-team halfback on the All-Big Ten Conference team. He placed second behind Iowa's Nile Kinnick in the voting for the Heisman Trophy, with Kinnick receiving 651 points to 405 for Harmon. Harmon also placed second behind Kinnick in the voting for the Chicago Tribune Silver Football trophy as the most valuable player in the Big Ten Conference.

Quarterback Forest Evashevski was also honored as a first-team All-Big Ten player. Known as one of the country's best blocking backs, Evashevski was voted by his teammates at the end of the season to serve as captain of the 1940 Michigan team.

In December 1939, Michigan's longtime rival, the University of Chicago, announced that it was dropping its football program. Chicago's decision opened the way for a new university to join the Big Ten Conference, with the leading candidates being Pitt, Michigan State, Notre Dame and Nebraska. In the end, the conference did not immediately add another university to replace Chicago. It was not until 1953 that the conference added Michigan State as its tenth team.

== Players ==
=== Varsity letter winners ===
On November 28, 1939, head coach Fritz Crisler presented varsity "M" letters to 25 players for their participation on the 1939 Michigan football team. With players who started at least half of Michigan's games during the 1939 season are listed in bold, the following list identifies the players who received varsity letters.

- Edward W. Czak, Elyria, Ohio - started 1 game at left end
- **Forest Evashevski**, Detroit - started 6 games at quarterback
- Robert Flora, Muskegon, Michigan - tackle
- **Ralph Fritz**, New Kensington, Pennsylvania - started 7 games at left guard
- **Ed Frutig**, River Rouge, Michigan - started 4 games at left end, 1 game at right end
- **Tom Harmon**, Gary, Indiana - started 7 games at right halfback
- Robert Ingalls, Marblehead, Massachusetts - started 1 game at center, 1 game at quarterback
- Forest Jordan, Clare, Michigan - guard
- Reuben Kelto, Bessemer, Michigan - tackle
- **Archie Kodros**, Alton, Illinois - started 7 games at center
- Paul Kromer, Lorain, Ohio - started 3 games at left halfback
- William Melzow, Flint, Michigan - guard
- **John Nicholson**, Elkhart, Indiana - started 4 games at right end, 1 game at left end
- Paul Nielsen, Ann Arbor, Michigan - end
- Frederick C. Olds, East Lansing, Michigan - started 1 game at left guard
- Hercules Renda, Jochin, West Virginia - started 1 game at left halfback
- Joe Rogers, Royal Oak, Michigan - started 2 games at left end, 2 games at right end
- **Roland Savilla**, Gallagher, West Virginia - started 7 games at left tackle
- **William A. Smith**, Riverside, California - started 8 games at right tackle
- Dave Strong, Helena, Montana - halfback
- **Milo Sukup**, Muskegon Heights, Michigan - started 8 games at right guard
- Horace Tinker, Battle Creek, Michigan - center
- **Fred Trosko**, Flint, Michigan - started 4 games at left halfback
- **Bob Westfall**, Ann Arbor, Michigan - started 7 games at fullback
- Bob Zimmerman, Chicago - started 1 game at fullback

=== Reserve awards ===
Crisler also presented "reserve awards" to the following players.

- Arthur Bennett, Schenectady, NY
- Jack Butler, Port Huron, MI - guard
- Norman D. Call, Norwalk, Ohio - started 1 game at right halfback
- Edward Christy, Gary, IN - fullback
- Thomas G. Ford, East Grand Rapids, MI - center
- Harlin E. Fraumann, Pontiac, MI - started 1 game at right end
- James Grissen, Holland, MI - fullback
- Theodore Kennedy, Jr., Saginaw, MI - end
- Walter I. Kitti, Calumet, MI - halfback
- Harry E. Kohl, Dayton, OH - started 1 game at quarterback
- William "Bullet Bill" Luther, Toledo, OH - halfback
- David M. Nelson, Detroit, MI - halfback
- George Ostroot - started 1 game at left tackle
- Arthur Paddy, Benton Harbor, MI - guard
- Larry D. Wickter, Toledo, OH - fullback
- Ernest P. Zielinski, Bay City, MI - tackle

=== Awards and honors ===
- Captain: Archie Kodros
- All-Americans: Tom Harmon (consensus)
- All-Conference: Forest Evashevski, Tom Harmon
- Most Valuable Player: Tom Harmon
- Meyer Morton Award: Ralph Fritz

=== Scoring leaders ===
Player	Touchdowns	Extra points	Field goals	Total Points
Tom Harmon	14	15	1	102
Forest Evashevski	4	1	0	25
Paul Kromer	3	0	0	18
Dave Strong	2	1	0	13
Fred Trosko	2	1	0	13
Bob Westfall	2	0	0	12
Ed Czak	2	0	0	12
David M. Nelson	1	0	0	6
Hercules Renda	1	0	0	6
Bob Zimmerman	1	0	0	6
William Melzow	0	5	0	5
James Grissen	0	1	0	1
**Totals**	**32**	**24**	**1**	**219**

== Coaching staff ==
- Head coach: Fritz Crisler
- Assistant coaches: Campbell Dickson, Earl Martineau, Biggie Munn, Bennie Oosterbaan, Wally Weber
- Trainer: Ray Roberts
- Manager: Carl D. Wheeler, Frederick Howarth (assistant), William Blanchard (assistant), Roger Yepsen (assistant), John Durr (assistant)
