= 1939 Minnesota Golden Gophers football team =

American college football season

1939 Minnesota Golden Gophers football
- Conference: Big Ten Conference
- Record: 3–4–1 (2–3–1 Big Ten)
- Head coach: Bernie Bierman (8th season)
- Offensive scheme: Single-wing
- MVP: Hal Van Every
- Captain: Win Pedersen
- Home stadium: Memorial Stadium

1939 Big Ten Conference football standings
	Conf.					Overall
Team	W		L		T	W		L		T
No. 15 Ohio State $	5	–	1	–	0	6	–	2	–	0
No. 9 Iowa	4	–	1	–	1	6	–	1	–	1
No. 20 Michigan	3	–	2	–	0	6	–	2	–	0
Purdue	2	–	1	–	2	3	–	3	–	2
Northwestern	3	–	2	–	1	3	–	4	–	1
Illinois	3	–	3	–	0	3	–	4	–	1
Minnesota	2	–	3	–	1	3	–	4	–	1
Indiana	2	–	3	–	0	2	–	4	–	2
Wisconsin	0	–	5	–	1	1	–	6	–	1
Chicago	0	–	3	–	0	2	–	6	–	0
$ – Conference champion; Rankings from AP Poll

The 1939 Minnesota Golden Gophers football team represented the University of Minnesota in the 1939 Big Ten Conference football season. In their eighth year under head coach Bernie Bierman, the Golden Gophers compiled a 3–4–1 record and outscored their opponents by a combined total of 154 to 82.

Minnesota was not ranked in the final AP poll, but it was ranked at No. 9 in the Litkenhous Ratings for 1939, and at No. 32 in the 1939 Williamson System ratings.

Tackle Win Pederson was named All-Big Ten first team. Halfback Hal Van Every was awarded the Team MVP Award.

Total attendance for the season was 229,954, which averaged to 45,991. The season high for attendance was against Northwestern.

== Schedule ==
Date	Opponent	Rank	Site	Result	Attendance	Source
September 30	Arizona*		Memorial Stadium; Minneapolis, MN	W 62–0	42,875	
October 7	at Nebraska*		Memorial Stadium; Lincoln, NE (rivalry)	L 0–6	33,000	
October 14	Purdue		Memorial Stadium; Minneapolis, MN	T 13–13	35,000	
October 21	No. 10 Ohio State^{†}		Memorial Stadium; Minneapolis, MN	L 20–23	52,000	
November 4	Northwestern		Memorial Stadium; Minneapolis, MN	L 7–14	53,200	
November 11	at No. 10 Michigan		Michigan Stadium; Ann Arbor, MI (Little Brown Jug)	W 20–7	64,945	
November 18	at No. 15 Iowa	No. 20	Iowa Stadium; Iowa City, IA (rivalry)	L 13–9	50,000	
November 25	Wisconsin		Memorial Stadium; Minneapolis, MN (rivalry)	W 23–6	40,000	
*Non-conference game; ^{†}Homecoming; Rankings from AP Poll released prior to the game

== Game summaries ==
=== Michigan ===
Week 6: Minnesota at Michigan

Team	1	2	3	4	Total
• Minnesota	7	0	6	7	20
Michigan	0	0	0	7	7

- Date: November 11, 1939
- Location: Michigan Stadium
  Ann Arbor, Michigan
- Game attendance: 64,945
- Referee: Frank Lane (Detroit)

On November 11, 1939, Minnesota defeated Michigan by a 20 to 7 score. The game was the 30th between the programs, with Minnesota having won the previous five games under head coach Bernie Bierman. Minnesota jumped to a 20 to 0 lead with touchdowns in the first, third and fourth quarters. Minnesota's touchdown in the third quarter came on a 59-yard run by halfback George Franck. In the fourth quarter, Michigan finally scored on touchdown pass from Tom Harmon to Paul Kromer. Harmon kicked for the PAT.

Michigan's starting lineup against Minnesota was Joe Rogers (left end), Roland Savilla (left tackle), Ralph Fritz (left guard), Archie Kodros (center), Milo Sukup (right guard), William Smith (right tackle), John Nicholson (right end), Ingalls (quarterback), Paul Kromer (left halfback), Harmon (right halfback), and Bob Westfall (fullback).
