= 1939 Illinois Fighting Illini football team =

American college football season

1939 Illinois Fighting Illini football
- Conference: Big Ten Conference
- Record: 3–4–1 (3–3 Big Ten)
- Head coach: Robert Zuppke (27th season)
- MVP: Mel Brewer
- Captain: William Lenich
- Home stadium: Memorial Stadium

1939 Big Ten Conference football standings
	Conf.					Overall
Team	W		L		T	W		L		T
No. 15 Ohio State $	5	–	1	–	0	6	–	2	–	0
No. 9 Iowa	4	–	1	–	1	6	–	1	–	1
No. 20 Michigan	3	–	2	–	0	6	–	2	–	0
Purdue	2	–	1	–	2	3	–	3	–	2
Northwestern	3	–	2	–	1	3	–	4	–	1
Illinois	3	–	3	–	0	3	–	4	–	1
Minnesota	2	–	3	–	1	3	–	4	–	1
Indiana	2	–	3	–	0	2	–	4	–	2
Wisconsin	0	–	5	–	1	1	–	6	–	1
Chicago	0	–	3	–	0	2	–	6	–	0
$ – Conference champion; Rankings from AP Poll

The 1939 Illinois Fighting Illini football team was an American football team that represented the University of Illinois during the 1939 Big Ten Conference football season. In their 27th season under head coach Robert Zuppke, the Illini compiled a 3–4–1 record and finished in sixth place in the Big Ten Conference. Bill Lenich was selected as the team's most valuable player.

Illinois was ranked at No. 62 (out of 609 teams) in the final Litkenhous Ratings for 1939.

== Schedule ==
Date	Opponent	Site	Result	Attendance	Source
September 30	Bradley*	Memorial Stadium; Champaign, IL	T 0–0	12,000	
October 14	at USC*	Los Angeles Memorial Coliseum; Los Angeles, CA	L 0–26	60,000	
October 21	Indiana	Memorial Stadium; Champaign, IL (rivalry)	L 6–7	20,000	
October 28	at Northwestern	Dyche Stadium; Evanston, IL (rivalry)	L 0–13	35,000	
November 4	No. 2 Michigan^{†}	Memorial Stadium; Champaign, IL (rivalry)	W 16–7	31,025	
November 11	Wisconsin	Memorial Stadium; Champaign, IL	W 7–0	17,665	
November 18	at No. 8 Ohio State	Ohio Stadium; Columbus, OH (Illibuck)	L 0–21	46,643	
November 25	at Chicago	Stagg Field; Chicago, IL	W 46–0	4,500	
*Non-conference game; ^{†}Homecoming; Rankings from AP Poll released prior to the game
