= 1939 Wisconsin Badgers football team =

American college football season

1939 Wisconsin Badgers football
- Conference: Big Ten Conference
- Record: 1–6–1 (0–5–1 Big Ten)
- Head coach: Harry Stuhldreher (4th season)
- MVP: George Paskvan
- Captain: Ralph Moeller
- Home stadium: Camp Randall Stadium

1939 Big Ten Conference football standings
	Conf.					Overall
Team	W		L		T	W		L		T
No. 15 Ohio State $	5	–	1	–	0	6	–	2	–	0
No. 9 Iowa	4	–	1	–	1	6	–	1	–	1
No. 20 Michigan	3	–	2	–	0	6	–	2	–	0
Purdue	2	–	1	–	2	3	–	3	–	2
Northwestern	3	–	2	–	1	3	–	4	–	1
Illinois	3	–	3	–	0	3	–	4	–	1
Minnesota	2	–	3	–	1	3	–	4	–	1
Indiana	2	–	3	–	0	2	–	4	–	2
Wisconsin	0	–	5	–	1	1	–	6	–	1
Chicago	0	–	3	–	0	2	–	6	–	0
$ – Conference champion; Rankings from AP Poll

The 1939 Wisconsin Badgers football team was an American football team that represented the University of Wisconsin in the 1939 Big Ten Conference football season. The team compiled a 1–6–1 record (0–5–1 against conference opponents) and finished in ninth place in the Big Ten Conference. Harry Stuhldreher was in his fourth year as Wisconsin's head coach.

Fullback George Paskvan was selected by the Associated Press and United Press as a first-team player on the 1939 All-Big Ten Conference football team. He was also selected as Wisconsin's most valuable player. Ralph Moeller was the team captain.

Wisconsin was ranked at No. 78 (out of 609 teams) in the final Litkenhous Ratings for 1939.

The team played its home games at Camp Randall Stadium, which had a capacity of 36,000. During the 1939 season, the average attendance at home games was 23,726.

== Schedule ==
Date	Opponent	Site	Result	Attendance	Source
September 30	Marquette*	Camp Randall Stadium; Madison, WI	W 14–13	29,000	
October 7	Texas*	Camp Randall Stadium; Madison, WI	L 7–17	25,000	
October 14	Indiana	Camp Randall Stadium; Madison, WI	L 0–14	19,000	
October 21	at Northwestern	Dyche Stadium; Evanston, IL	L 7–13	40,000	
October 28	Iowa	Camp Randall Stadium; Madison, WI (rivalry)	L 13–19	21,000	
November 11	at Illinois	Memorial Stadium; Champaign, IL	L 0–7	17,665	
November 18	Purdue^{†}	Camp Randall Stadium; Madison, WI	T 7–7	32,000	
November 25	at Minnesota	Memorial Stadium; Minneapolis, MN (rivalry)	L 6–23	40,000	
*Non-conference game; ^{†}Homecoming
