= 1939 Northwestern Wildcats football team =

American college football season

1939 Northwestern Wildcats football
- Conference: Big Ten Conference
- Record: 3–4–1 (3–2–1 Big Ten)
- Head coach: Pappy Waldorf (5th season)
- Offensive scheme: Single-wing
- MVP: Jack Haman
- Captain: Hal Method
- Home stadium: Dyche Stadium

1939 Big Ten Conference football standings
	Conf.					Overall
Team	W		L		T	W		L		T
No. 15 Ohio State $	5	–	1	–	0	6	–	2	–	0
No. 9 Iowa	4	–	1	–	1	6	–	1	–	1
No. 20 Michigan	3	–	2	–	0	6	–	2	–	0
Purdue	2	–	1	–	2	3	–	3	–	2
Northwestern	3	–	2	–	1	3	–	4	–	1
Illinois	3	–	3	–	0	3	–	4	–	1
Minnesota	2	–	3	–	1	3	–	4	–	1
Indiana	2	–	3	–	0	2	–	4	–	2
Wisconsin	0	–	5	–	1	1	–	6	–	1
Chicago	0	–	3	–	0	2	–	6	–	0
$ – Conference champion; Rankings from AP Poll

The 1939 Northwestern Wildcats team was an American football team that represented Northwestern University during the 1939 Big Ten Conference football season. In their fifth year under head coach Pappy Waldorf, the Wildcats compiled a 3–4–1 record (3–2–1 against Big Ten Conference opponents) and finished in fifth place in the Big Ten Conference.

Northwestern was not ranked in the final AP poll, but it was ranked at No. 29 in the 1939 Williamson System ratings, and at No. 30 in the final Litkenhous Ratings for 1939.

== Schedule ==
Date	Opponent	Site	Result	Attendance	Source
October 7	Oklahoma*	Dyche Stadium; Evanston, IL	L 0–23	45,000	
October 14	at Ohio State	Ohio Stadium; Columbus, OH	L 0–13	55,622	
October 21	Wisconsin	Dyche Stadium; Evanston, IL	W 13–7	40,000	
October 28	Illinois	Dyche Stadium; Evanston, IL (rivalry)	W 13–0	35,000	
November 4	at Minnesota	Memorial Stadium; Minneapolis, MN	W 14–7	53,200	
November 11	Purdue	Dyche Stadium; Evanston, IL	L 0–3	40,000	
November 18	at No. 9 Notre Dame*	Notre Dame Stadium; Notre Dame, IN (rivalry)	L 0–7	53,000	
November 25	No. 9 Iowa	Dyche Stadium; Evanston, IL	T 7–7	40,000	
*Non-conference game; Rankings from AP Poll released prior to the game
