= 1939 Purdue Boilermakers football team =

American college football season

1939 Purdue Boilermakers football
- Conference: Big Ten Conference
- Record: 3–3–2 (2–1–2 Big Ten)
- Head coach: Mal Elward (3rd season)
- MVP: Frank Bykowski
- Captain: None
- Home stadium: Ross–Ade Stadium

1939 Big Ten Conference football standings
	Conf.					Overall
Team	W		L		T	W		L		T
No. 15 Ohio State $	5	–	1	–	0	6	–	2	–	0
No. 9 Iowa	4	–	1	–	1	6	–	1	–	1
No. 20 Michigan	3	–	2	–	0	6	–	2	–	0
Purdue	2	–	1	–	2	3	–	3	–	2
Northwestern	3	–	2	–	1	3	–	4	–	1
Illinois	3	–	3	–	0	3	–	4	–	1
Minnesota	2	–	3	–	1	3	–	4	–	1
Indiana	2	–	3	–	0	2	–	4	–	2
Wisconsin	0	–	5	–	1	1	–	6	–	1
Chicago	0	–	3	–	0	2	–	6	–	0
$ – Conference champion; Rankings from AP Poll

The 1939 Purdue Boilermakers football team was an American football team that represented Purdue University during the 1939 Big Ten Conference football season. In their third season under head coach Mal Elward, the Boilermakers compiled a 3–3–2 record, finished in fourth place in the Big Ten Conference with a 2–1–2 record against conference opponents, and outscored opponents by a total of 56 to 53.

Purdue was not ranked in the final AP poll, but it was ranked at No. 27 in the 1939 Williamson System ratings, and at No. 33 in the final Litkenhous Ratings for 1939.

== Schedule ==
Date	Opponent	Site	Result	Attendance	Source
September 30	at Notre Dame*	Notre Dame Stadium; Notre Dame, IN (rivalry)	L 0–3	40,000	
October 14	at Minnesota	Memorial Stadium; Minneapolis, MN	T 13–13	35,000	
October 21	Michigan State*	Ross–Ade Stadium; West Lafayette, IN	W 20–7	21,000	
October 28	at Santa Clara*	Kezar Stadium; San Francisco, CA	L 6–13	20,000	
November 4	Iowa^{†}	Ross–Ade Stadium; West Lafayette, IN	L 0–4	22,000	
November 11	at Northwestern	Dyche Stadium; Evanston, IL	W 3–0	40,000	
November 18	at Wisconsin	Camp Randall Stadium; Madison, WI	T 7–7	32,000	
November 25	at Indiana	Memorial Stadium; Bloomington, IN (Old Oaken Bucket)	W 7–6	25,000	
*Non-conference game; ^{†}Homecoming

== Roster ==
- Morrie Aronson, G
- W. E. Britt, E
- Lou Brock, HB
- Jack Brown, HB
- Mike Byelene, HB
- Frank Bykowski, G
- Bill Combs, E
- Leon DeWitte, FB
- George Gale, QB
- John Galvin, HB
- Ted Hennis, QB
- LaVerne Johnson, G-T
- Richard Johnson, T
- John Krause, E
- Ralph Lehr, E
- Paul Liebrecht, FB
- Felix Mackiewicz, E
- Tom Melton, G
- Jim Miller, G
- Fred Montague, QB
- Augie Morningstar, C
- William Neff, T
- Basil Petry, C
- John Petty, FB
- Dick Potter, T
- David Rankin, E
- Al Rossi, T
- Italo Rossi, T
- Allen Shackleton, QB
- Dick Stephenson, E
- Al Thom, HB
- Carl Verplank, G
- Robert Vyverberg, HB
- Jim Welsch, HB
- Frank Winchell, FB
- Jack Winchell, G
- Donald Yeager, HB-E
