= 1939 Iowa Hawkeyes football team =

American college football season

1939 Iowa Hawkeyes football
- Conference: Big Ten Conference

Ranking
- AP: No. 9
- Record: 6–1–1 (4–1–1 Big Ten)
- Head coach: Eddie Anderson (1st season)
- MVP: Nile Kinnick
- Home stadium: Iowa Stadium

1939 Big Ten Conference football standings
	Conf.					Overall
Team	W		L		T	W		L		T
No. 15 Ohio State $	5	–	1	–	0	6	–	2	–	0
No. 9 Iowa	4	–	1	–	1	6	–	1	–	1
No. 20 Michigan	3	–	2	–	0	6	–	2	–	0
Purdue	2	–	1	–	2	3	–	3	–	2
Northwestern	3	–	2	–	1	3	–	4	–	1
Illinois	3	–	3	–	0	3	–	4	–	1
Minnesota	2	–	3	–	1	3	–	4	–	1
Indiana	2	–	3	–	0	2	–	4	–	2
Wisconsin	0	–	5	–	1	1	–	6	–	1
Chicago	0	–	3	–	0	2	–	6	–	0
$ – Conference champion; Rankings from AP Poll

The 1939 Iowa Hawkeyes football team, known as the "Ironmen" team, was an American football team that represented the University of Iowa as a member of the Big Ten Conference during the 1939 Big Ten football season. In their first season under head coach Eddie Anderson, the Hawkeyes compiled a 6–1–1 record (4–1–1 in conference games), finished in second place in the Big Ten, and outscored opponents by a total of 130 to 91. They were ranked No. 9 in the final 1939 AP poll and No. 26 in the final Litkenhous Ratings.

The 1939 Hawkeyes gained 1,014 rushing yards and 749 passing yards. On defense, they gave up 1,074 rushing yards and 605 passing yards.

Halfback Nile Kinnick was a consensus first-team All-American who won the Heisman Trophy, the Maxwell Award, and the Chicago Tribune Silver Football. Kinnick starred on offense, defense, and special teams. He led the 1939 team in passing (638 yards), rushing (374 yards) and scoring (41 points) and set a school record with 23 points scored against South Dakota (9/30/39). He still shares Iowa's single-season record with his eight interceptions in 1939. He also contributed as the team's punter and punt returner. He set Iowa single-game records that still stand with 731 yards on 16 punts against Notre Dame (11/11/39) and 201 yards on nine punt returns (including a 73-yard punt) against Indiana (19/7/39).

Anderson won the AFCA Coach of the Year award. Kinnick, end Erv Prasse, and tackle Mike Enich received first-team All-Big Ten honors. Prasse was the team captain.

The team played its home games at Iowa Stadium in Iowa City, Iowa. Home attendance was 129,500, an average of 32,375 per game.

== Preseason ==
Iowa football was clearly struggling as 1939 began. In fact, the entire Iowa athletic department was in poor financial shape. The Great Depression had greatly impacted the small farming state, and Iowa's athletic receipts sharply declined throughout the 1930s. The debt on Iowa Stadium, which was built in 1929, grew by the year. The Hawkeyes had finished among the worst three teams in the Big Ten standings every year in the 1930s except 1933. Iowa had won just one Big Ten game in the last three years, and the team they beat, Chicago, announced that they would be dropping their football program following the 1939 season. Chicago soon withdrew from the Big Ten Conference.

After compiling a 2–13–1 record in two years at Iowa, head football coach Irl Tubbs was fired. Iowa athletic director E. G. Schroeder tried to inject some life into the program by hiring Dr. Eddie Anderson of Holy Cross. Anderson, a Mason City, Iowa native, played and coached under Knute Rockne at Notre Dame. He was the 1921 Notre Dame team captain, and Notre Dame went 28–1 in Anderson's last three years as a player. Ironically, the lone loss was to the 1921 Hawkeyes.

Around 85 players arrived for spring practice in 1939. About fifty of them did not return in the fall. Anderson installed a complicated new offense and conducted rigorous practices. The 1939 Hawkeye team would be severely lacking in depth. Anderson felt the Hawks could still be a good team in 1939, but only if the starters played significant minutes. A coach brought in temporarily to help with Iowa's spring practice was quoted as saying when he left, "Among 5000 male students at the University of Iowa, there are only five real football players."

Michigan, Minnesota, Northwestern, and Ohio State were the Big Ten favorites for the 1939 season, while many sportswriters liked Purdue. Notre Dame was also highly ranked nationally. Iowa was picked at the bottom of the Big Ten.

Before the season, Iowa's best player appeared to be Nile Kinnick. Kinnick was an all-Big Ten selection as a sophomore, when he led the nation in punting average, but he struggled through an injury-riddled junior season. As a result, end Erwin Prasse, an all-Big Ten selection in 1938, was elected as the team captain of the 1939 Hawkeyes. However, Kinnick had recovered from his injuries and was ready for a standout senior season.

== Schedule ==
Date	Opponent	Rank	Site	Result	Attendance	Source
September 30	South Dakota*		Iowa Stadium; Iowa City, IA	W 41–0	16,000	
October 7	Indiana		Iowa Stadium; Iowa City, IA	W 32–29	17,500	
October 14	at Michigan		Michigan Stadium; Ann Arbor, MI	L 7–27	27,512	
October 28	at Wisconsin		Camp Randall Stadium; Madison, WI (rivalry)	W 19–13	21,000	
November 4	at Purdue		Ross–Ade Stadium; West Lafayette, IN	W 4–0	22,000	
November 11	No. 3 Notre Dame*		Iowa Stadium; Iowa City, IA	W 7–6	46,000	
November 18	No. 20 Minnesota^{†}	No. 15	Iowa Stadium; Iowa City, IA (rivalry)	W 13–9	50,000	
November 25	at Northwestern	No. 9	Dyche Stadium; Evanston, IL	T 7–7	40,000	
*Non-conference game; ^{†}Homecoming; Rankings from AP Poll released prior to the game

== Roster ==
The following players received varsity letters for their performance on the 1939 Iowa football team:

#	Name	Position	Year	Hometown
10	Larry Ely	Guard	Sophomore	Des Moines, Iowa
11	Gerald Ankeny	Quarterback	Sophomore	Dixon, Illinois
12	Floyd Dean	Halfback	Senior	Atlantic, Iowa
14	Bruno Andruska	Center	Junior	Chicago, Illinois
15	George Falk	Halfback	Senior	Des Moines, Iowa
16	Jack Edling	Center	Junior	Moorhead, Minnesota
19	George Frye	Center	Sophomore	Albia, Iowa
20	Edwin McLain	Halfback	Senior	Wauwatosa, Wisconsin
21	Jens Norgaard	End	Junior	Iowa City, Iowa
23	Carl Conrad	Tackle	Junior	Fonda, Iowa
24	Nile Kinnick	Halfback	Senior	Adel, Iowa
25	William B. Gallagher	Quarterback	Junior	Oskaloosa, Iowa
27	Charles Tollefson	Guard	Junior	Elk Point, South Dakota
29	William Diehl	Center	Sophomore	Cedar Rapids, Iowa
30	Al Couppee	Quarterback	Sophomore	Council Bluffs, Iowa
31	James Robert Otto	Tackle	Sophomore	Fort Dodge, Iowa
33	Mike Enich	Tackle	Junior	Boone, Iowa
35	Richard Evans	End	Senior	Chicago, Illinois
37	Erwin Prasse	End, captain	Senior	Chicago, Illinois
39	Ken Pettit	End	Junior	Logan, Iowa
43	William C. Green	Fullback	Sophomore	Newton, Iowa
44	Wallace Bergstrom	Tackle	Sophomore	Winfield, Iowa
45	Robert Kelley	Tackle	Sophomore	Sioux City, Iowa
49	Henry Vollenweider	Fullback	Sophomore	Dubuque, Iowa
50	Burdell Gilleard	Halfback	Sophomore	New London, Iowa
52	Herman Snider	Guard	Junior	Iowa City, Iowa
55	Fred Smith	End	Senior	Cedar Rapids, Iowa
60	Russell Busk	Halfback	Senior	Clinton, Iowa
63	James Walker	Tackle	Sophomore	South Bend, Indiana
64	Max Hawkins	Guard	Junior	Philadelphia, Mississippi
65	Joseph Moore	End	Senior	Ida Grove, Iowa
68	Roger Pettit	Halfback	Sophomore	Logan, Iowa
69	James Murphy Jr.	Fullback	Junior	Great Neck, New York
88	Henry Luebcke	Guard	Junior	Chicago, Illinois

== Game summaries ==
=== South Dakota ===
	1	2	3	4	Total
Coyotes	0	0	0	0	0
Hawkeyes	7	21	6	7	41

After a few uneventful series, Iowa got its first touchdown of the year on a 65-yard touchdown run by Kinnick. The Hawkeyes broke the game open in the second quarter, as Kinnick scored three touchdowns (two rushing, one passing) in the period.

Coach Anderson pulled many of his starters at halftime, but Vollenweider returned the second half kickoff 92 yards for a touchdown. Anderson, upset with the futility of the offense in the second half, reinserted Kinnick into the lineup with less than a minute remaining in the game. Kinnick quickly led Iowa down the field and passed for the touchdown, his fifth of the game.

Box Score – South Dakota vs. Iowa, 9/30/1939
IA – Kinnick 65-yard run (Kinnick kick good)
IA – Kinnick 4-yard run (Kinnick kick good)
IA – Kinnick 13-yard run (Kinnick kick good)
IA – Kinnick 62-yard pass to Busk (Kinnick kick good)
IA – Vollenweider 92-yard kickoff return (Roger Pettit kick missed)
IA – Kinnick 15-yard pass to Kelley (Kinnick kick good)

- The Hawkeyes started Diehl, Tollefson, Luebcke, Walker, and Enich on the line, Prasse and Evans at end, and Couppee, Busk, Murphy, and Kinnick in the backfield.
- Kinnick's father, Nile Kinnick Sr., traveled to Iowa City to see this game, thinking that it might be his only chance all season to see Iowa get a win.
- Green and Dean got interceptions for Iowa. Moore and Couppee each recovered a fumble.
- It was Iowa's first home win since October 1937.
- Kinnick carried 8 times for 110 yards and three touchdowns. His 23 points were the most in a game at Iowa since Oran "Nanny" Pape scored 24 points in a game in 1928.
- Kinnick would sit for most of the second half, the only game action he would miss until the season finale against Northwestern.
- Vollenweider's kickoff return set a stadium record that stood for 10 years. It was broken by Bill Reichardt, who returned a kickoff 99 yards for a touchdown in 1949 against Oregon. Vollenweider's touchdown was Iowa's only special teams touchdown of the season.

=== Indiana ===
	1	2	3	4	Total
Hoosiers	10	7	12	0	29
Hawkeyes	7	13	0	12	32

Indiana jumped out to a quick 10–0 lead, but a 73-yard Kinnick punt changed field position to lead to Iowa's first touchdown. Kinnick then used a 55-yard run to set up Iowa's second touchdown. Prasse caught his second touchdown pass of the game to give Iowa 20 unanswered points, but Indiana countered with a touchdown pass of their own just before halftime.

Indiana dominated play in the third period, taking a nine-point lead. Diehl got a crucial interception to stop another Indiana drive early in the fourth period, and Iowa responded with an 11 play drive to cut Indiana's lead to 3 points. Green came up with an interception that gave Iowa the ball in Indiana territory. Iowa advanced to the Indiana ten-yard line, but the Hoosiers drove Iowa five yards back in three plays to bring up fourth and goal from the fifteen. Rather than attempt a game-tying field goal with minutes to play, Iowa went for the win and got it, as Kinnick fired his third touchdown pass to Prasse.

Box Score – Indiana vs. Iowa, 10/7/1939
IN – Herbert 24-yard FG
IN – Brooks 23-yard run (Herbert kick good)
IA – Kinnick 30-yard pass to Prasse (Kinnick kick good)
IA – Kinnick 3-yard run (Kinnick kick good)
IA – Kinnick 50-yard pass to Prasse (Kinnick kick missed)
IN – Hursh 8-yard pass to Tipmore (Topil kick good)
IN – Hursh 35-yard pass to Zimmer (Herbert kick blocked)
IN – Hursh 5-yard pass to Rucinski (Herbert kick blocked)
IA – Green 3-yard run (Kinnick kick missed)
IA – Kinnick 15-yard pass to Prasse (Kinnick kick missed)

- The temperature at kickoff was in the mid 90s. Several players had to leave the game due to dehydration, as the heat was oppressive.
- Iowa started the same players as they did against South Dakota.
- It was just the fourth time in 40 years that Iowa had won its first conference game. It was Iowa's first conference victory at home since 1933 and Iowa's first victory over Indiana since 1921.
- 23 Iowa players participated, the most in any game all season.
- Kinnick, Tollefson, and Walker played all 60 minutes.
- Couppee injured his shoulder and had to leave the game; he would wear a brace for the rest of the season. Luebcke suffered a career-ending abdominal hernia. Enich collapsed on the field from severe dehydration and was sent to the hospital.
- Before the game, the Indianapolis News reported that the Hoosiers had "a quiet confidence that they will win it. Of course, Iowa feels the same, maybe more so. And Indiana doesn't have a Kinnick."
- Kinnick's stat line was astounding. He returned nine punts for 201 yards, both school records which still stand today. He had 103 yards rushing on 19 carries and one touchdown, 108 yards passing and three touchdowns, 201 punt return yards, 171 kick return yards, 4 punts for 172 yards, an interception return for 20 yards, and two extra point kicks.
- Prasse's three touchdowns receiving set a stadium record that stood for 66 years. It was finally broken by Ed Hinkel, who caught four touchdowns against Minnesota in 2005.

=== Michigan ===
	1	2	3	4	Total
Hawkeyes	7	0	0	0	7
Wolverines	7	13	7	0	27

An early Kinnick touchdown pass was not enough for the Hawks, as Michigan scored the last 27 points of the game. Iowa outgained the Wolverines by over 100 yards, but turnovers and special teams woes doomed the Hawkeyes to their only defeat of the season. Kinnick fumbled a Michigan punt, which set up Michigan's game tying score. An Iowa drive to the Michigan 12-yard line was halted when Harmon intercepted a Kinnick pass attempt for Prasse in end zone.

A long punt return led to Michigan's second score, and Kinnick's only blocked punt of the season gave Michigan position for a third touchdown. Iowa's best field position of the second half saw Iowa with the ball at the Michigan 18-yard line. Tom Harmon sealed the game for Michigan when he snatched Kinnick's pass for the end zone and returned it 90 yards for the Wolverines' fourth touchdown.

Box Score – Iowa vs. Michigan, 10/14/1939
IA – Kinnick 71-yard pass to Dean (Kinnick kick good)
MI – Harmon 2-yard run (Harmon kick good)
MI – Harmon 2-yard run (Harmon kick missed)
MI – Harmon 8-yard run (Harmon kick good)
MI – Harmon 90-yard interception return (Harmon kick good)

- The Hawkeyes started Diehl, Tollefson, Snider, Walker, and Enich on the line, Prasse and Norgaard at end, and Couppee, Dean, Murphy, and Kinnick in the backfield.
- Kinnick and Enich played all 60 minutes.
- Couppee's shoulder injury forced him out of the game. Walker severely injured his knee and was thought to possibly be out for the season. Diehl left the game due to injury as well.
- Archie Kodros, who would later serve as assistant football coach at Iowa from 1952 to 1965, was the Michigan team captain.
- Forest Evashevski, who would become a Hall of Fame coach for the Hawkeyes, was also on the 1939 Michigan team.

=== Wisconsin ===
	1	2	3	4	Total
Hawkeyes	0	6	6	7	19
Badgers	7	0	6	0	13

Iowa had yielded 34 unanswered points going back to the Michigan game after Wisconsin scored the game's opening touchdown. But Kinnick returned the ensuing kickoff 55 yards to the Wisconsin 35-yard line, and the Hawkeyes responded with a touchdown of their own. Iowa's missed extra point gave Wisconsin a one-point halftime advantage.

Iowa briefly pulled ahead on a Kinnick touchdown pass before Wisconsin drove 79 yards to reclaim the lead at 13–12. A Dean interception early in the final period gave Kinnick the opportunity to complete another game-clinching, fourth-quarter touchdown. Hawkins and Dean each intercepted passes late to cut off Badger rallies.

Box Score – Iowa vs. Wisconsin, 10/28/1939
WI – Gradisnik 14-yard pass to Gage (Gage kick good)
IA – Kinnick 19-yard pass to Couppee (Kinnick kick missed)
IA – Kinnick 38-yard pass to Evans (Kinnick kick missed)
WI – Schmitz 9-yard pass to Lorenz (Gage kick blocked)
IA – Kinnick 29-yard pass to Green (Kinnick kick good)

- The Hawkeyes started Diehl, Tollefson, Bergstrom, Hawkins, and Enich on the line, Smith and Norgaard at end, and Couppee, McLain, Murphy, and Kinnick in the backfield.
- Enich, Hawkins, Tollefson, Bergstrom, and Kinnick played all 60 minutes.
- Diehl suffered a season ending knee injury in the game, while Norgaard suffered a career ending neck injury.
- The term "Ironmen" to describe the 1939 Hawkeyes gained widespread use after this game.
- Prasse did not start the game, as Anderson elected bring him off of the bench. As a result, Kinnick served as the acting captain this game.
- It was Dad's Day in Madison.

=== Purdue ===
	1	2	3	4	Total
Hawkeyes	0	0	0	4	4
Boilermakers	0	0	0	0	0

The Boilermakers had practiced all week to shut down Kinnick's passing, and Purdue's Jack Brown intercepted four Kinnick passes in the game. Iowa had an apparent touchdown negated by a false start on Ken Pettit in the first half, and turnovers killed the other Iowa drives. A fumble ended Purdue's only serious scoring threat of a scoreless first half.

The defensive struggle continued until early in the fourth quarter, when Iowa forced a punt deep in Purdue territory. Enich blocked the kick, and Prasse recovered to give Iowa field position. Though Iowa turned the ball over on downs, the Hawkeyes soon forced another Purdue punt, this time from Purdue's end zone. A bobbled snap allowed Iowa to tackle Brown for the safety and the game's first points.

A Kinnick punt late in the fourth quarter pinned Purdue deep in their own territory, and Iowa again forced Purdue to punt from their own end zone. Enich came crashing through the line for his second blocked punt of the game, and Brown recovered it in the end zone for another Iowa safety. Iowa then ran out the clock on one of the most bizarre final scores in Hawkeye football history.

Box Score – Iowa vs. Purdue, 11/4/1939
IA – Brown tackled for safety IA 2–0
IA – Brown tackled for safety IA 4–0

- The Hawkeyes started Snider, Ken Pettit, Andruska, Bergstrom, and Enich on the line, Prasse and Evans at end, and Couppee, McLain, Murphy, and Kinnick in the backfield.
- Ken Pettit, Andruska, Bergstrom, Enich, Prasse, Evans, Couppee, and Kinnick played all 60 minutes.
- Dean injured his shoulder in the game and had to wear a brace for the remainder of the season.
- The Hawkeyes were a road underdog for the third straight game, as Purdue had been an early favorite to win the Big Ten title.
- Iowa held Purdue to 75 total yards for the game.
- It was Homecoming in West Lafayette.
- Anderson blasted Couppee at halftime, screaming, "When we get down on the goal line, there's just one guy on this football team that should get that football! Do you even know who he is? Why don't you meet Nile Kinnick!" Anderson then forced Couppee to walk to Kinnick and "introduce" himself and shake his hand.
- When the team returned to Iowa City, they were greeted by thousands of Hawkeye fans who led the team downtown in a spontaneous parade.
- After the game, line coach Jim Harris quipped, "Enich hit a home run with the bases loaded."

=== Notre Dame ===
	1	2	3	4	Total
Fighting Irish	0	0	0	6	6
Hawkeyes	0	7	0	0	7

Both teams played very conservatively in the first half, as the teams punted back and forth. Toward the end of the second quarter, Kinnick made a touchdown saving tackle on a Notre Dame run at the Notre Dame 41-yard line. On the next play, a Notre Dame pass was intercepted by Kinnick at the Iowa 45-yard line, and Kinnick dodged several tacklers to return the ball 20 yards with less than two minutes remaining in the first half.

On the next play, Kinnick fired a pass for Dean in the end zone, but it was intercepted by Steve Sitko at the goal line. Sitko returned the ball for a few yards before being hit hard by Andruska, forcing a fumble. Dean and Evans recovered at the Notre Dame 4-yard line. Rushes by Kinnick and Dean for no gain brought up third down, and Notre Dame called a time out. Kinnick shifted to right halfback on third down and carried the ball over the goal line for the touchdown with forty seconds remaining in the half. Kinnick added the extra point under a heavy rush to give Iowa a 7–0 halftime lead.

Most of the third quarter, like the first half, was just a long exchange of punts. But late in the period, Notre Dame put together their best sustained drive of the game. The third quarter ended with the Irish on the Iowa 10-yard line. On the second play of the fourth quarter, Notre Dame rushed ahead for the touchdown. But the critical extra point attempt missed wide left, and the Hawkeyes still held a one-point lead.

Iowa's defense continued for force punts from the Notre Dame offense, while Kinnick's booming punts kept Notre Dame on the other side of the field. With under two minutes remaining in the game, Kinnick's 16th punt of the game traveled 63 yards and rolled out of bounds at the Notre Dame 6-yard line, effectively sealing the Iowa victory.

Box Score – Notre Dame vs. Iowa, 11/11/1939
IA – Kinnick 3-yard run (Kinnick kick good) IA 7–0
ND – Piepul 6-yard run (Zontini kick missed) IA 7–6

- Iowa started the same players as they did against Purdue.
- Ken Pettit, Andruska, Bergstrom, Enich, Prasse, Evans, Couppee, and Kinnick played the full 60 minutes.
- Notre Dame was ranked #3 in the nation by the Associated Press.
- The game was played on Armistice Day, now known as Veteran's Day. Kinnick was later killed in a plane crash, training to fight in the Navy during World War II.
- Kinnick kicked 16 punts for 731 yards. Both are school records for Iowa that still stand today.
- Notre Dame switched from (navy) blue jerseys to green jerseys at halftime, probably to avoid confusion with Iowa's black home jerseys.
- The University of Iowa canceled classes on Monday following the victory.
- When huddling before Kinnick's touchdown (one of perhaps three convened by Couppee all year), a play was called for Buzz Dean, but he had a separated shoulder.
- Ironically, considering his halftime tirade in favor of running Kinnick the week before against Purdue, Anderson was reported to have been yelling, "Don't give the ball to Kinnick! Everybody in the stadium knows you're gonna give the ball to Kinnick!" at Couppee during the aforementioned huddle. He got the ball anyway and scored.

=== Minnesota ===
	1	2	3	4	Total
Golden Gophers	0	3	6	0	9
Hawkeyes	0	0	0	13	13

Minnesota missed a field goal in the first period, and Sonny Franck intercepted a Kinnick pass in Minnesota territory to end Iowa's first scoring threat. Minnesota converted in the second quarter on their second field goal try of the game, and Harold Van Every made a spectacular one-handed interception of a Kinnick pass deep in Gopher territory late in the first half to keep Iowa scoreless at halftime.

A Minnesota punt pinned the Hawkeyes at their own four-yard line in the third quarter, and a 20-yard return of the ensuing Iowa punt gave the Gophers the ball at Iowa's 28-yard line. A series of running plays brought up fourth and goal from the Iowa six-yard line. Franck rushed toward the end zone, and officials ruled that Franck narrowly crossed the goal line, despite Iowa's protests. The controversial touchdown gave Minnesota a nine-point lead.

But Kinnick rallied Iowa again. Early in the fourth quarter, Kinnick led Iowa on a quick five play, 79-yard drive for a touchdown to cut the Minnesota lead to two points. With five minutes remaining, Iowa took over possession at their own 21-yard line. After a few plays, Kinnick threw an interception, but Minnesota was flagged for interference, giving Iowa the ball at midfield. Three plays later, Kinnick threw the game-winning touchdown pass to Green with three minutes left in the game. Minnesota's final threat was eliminated when Kinnick came up with an interception at midfield.

Box Score – Minnesota vs. Iowa, 11/18/1939
MN – Mernick 27-yard FG
MN – Franck 6-yard run (Mernick kick blocked)
IA – Kinnick 48-yard pass to Prasse (Kinnick kick good)
IA – Kinnick 28-yard pass to Green (Kinnick kick blocked)

- The Hawkeyes had the same starting lineup for the third straight week.
- Ken Pettit, Andruska, Bergstrom, Enich, Prasse, Evans, and Kinnick played the full 60 minutes.
- Iowa was ranked 15th in the Associated Press poll at the time of the game, the first time in Iowa history that the Hawkeyes had been ranked.
- Couppee sprained his other shoulder and injured his ribs. Andruska played the entire second half with a broken wrist; he would miss the Northwestern game. Ken Pettit badly injured his wrist, but he would not allow it to be x-rayed for fear of being forced to miss the Northwestern game. Gallagher badly sprained his shoulder. Dean and Tollefson suffered leg injuries, and Prasse had a badly bruised arm.
- Swelling and numbness in Kinnick's passing hand allowed him to throw only every other play so he could rest it on running plays.
- With the win, Iowa won the Floyd of Rosedale trophy for the first time.
- One Chicago paper wrote, "Nile Kinnick 13, Minnesota 9; tersely, that tells the story of the most spectacular football game in modern Big Ten history."
- James Kearns of the Chicago Daily News wrote, "There's a golden helmet riding on a human sea across Iowa's football field in the twilight here. Now the helmet rises as wave upon wave of humanity pours onto the field. There's a boy under the helmet, which is shining like a crown on his head. A golden #24 gleams on his slumping, tired shoulders. The boy is Nile Clarke Kinnick Jr., who has, just now, risen above all the defenses that could be raised against him...leading a frenzied little band of Iowa football players to a victory which was impossible. They couldn't win, but they did."
- It was Iowa's fourth Big Ten win, the most at Iowa since 1922.

=== Northwestern ===
	1	2	3	4	Total
Hawkeyes	0	0	0	7	7
Wildcats	0	7	0	0	7

Iowa spent most of the first half in Northwestern territory, but five first half fumbles, including one at the Northwestern 3-yard line, stopped all Hawkeye scoring threats. A 74-yard Northwestern punt changed field position, and Northwestern put together a good drive late in the first half. The Wildcats scored on a touchdown run with twenty seconds remaining in the first half to take a seven-point halftime lead.

Northwestern's third quarter drives were stopped by turnovers, but Iowa could not capitalize on many of them as Kinnick left the game with a separated shoulder. Enich recovered a Wildcat fumble, Northwestern's third turnover of the period, at the Iowa 22-yard line to give Iowa good field position going into the fourth quarter. Northwestern was called for interference on Prasse on a fourth down pass into the end zone, giving Iowa field position to score the game-tying touchdown.

Midway through the fourth quarter, the Wildcats were able to drive to the Iowa goal line. But an Enich tackle stopped Northwestern for no gain on fourth and goal inside the Iowa one-yard line. Northwestern later missed a desperation field goal, and Iowa ran out the clock to end the game with a 7–7 tie.

Box Score – Iowa vs. Northwestern, 11/25/1939
NW – Clawson 1-yard run (Conteas kick good)
IA – Murphy 1-yard run (Dean kick good)

- The Hawkeyes started Snider, Ken Pettit, Frye, Bergstrom, and Enich on the line, Prasse and Evans at end, and Couppee, McLain, Murphy, and Kinnick in the backfield.
- Snider, Ken Pettit, Frye, Enich, Prasse, and Evans played the full 60 minutes.
- Bergstrom and Murphy suffered season ending injuries; they were replaced by Vollenweider and Walker, who had not fully recovered from his knee injury. Tollefson and Snider were injured in the game as well.
- The tie cost Iowa the 1939 Big Ten title. Iowa, with a 4–1–1 conference record, finished the season second in the Big Ten standings behind conference champion Ohio State, which had a 5–1 Big Ten record. Had Iowa won the game, they would have shared the title as the teams had not played.
- Anderson pulled Couppee late in the game, as Couppee threw passes frantically on the last drive in an attempt to win the game. Anderson, who erroneously thought a tie would still give Iowa a share of the conference title (which went to Ohio State), was convinced that Couppee had suffered a concussion, and sent in the backup quarterback with instructions to "sit on the ball." Anderson later apologized to Couppee for benching him.

== Postseason ==
- Kinnick threw for 638 yards and 11 touchdowns on only 31 passes and ran for 374 yards and 5 touchdowns.
- Kinnick was involved in 107 of the 130 points that Iowa scored and played 402 of a possible 420 minutes.
- Kinnick set the school record with eight interceptions in a season, a record which still stands today.
- Nile Kinnick won virtually every major award in the country. He was named:
  - A consensus first team All-American
  - The Big Ten MVP
  - The Walter Camp Award winner
  - The Maxwell Award winner
  - The Heisman Trophy winner
  - Associated Press Male Athlete of the Year
- Iowa was ranked ninth in the final Associated Press (AP) poll.
- Iowa did not attempt a field goal all season.
- Erwin Prasse was a second team All-American.
- Mike Enich actually played more minutes in 1939 than Nile Kinnick. In the final seven games, Kinnick played six complete games before leaving in the third quarter against Northwestern. Enich left the Indiana game in the fourth quarter before finishing the season by playing six complete games.
- Nile Kinnick, Erwin Prasse, and Mike Enich were named all-Big Ten.
