= Jimmy Strausbaugh =

American football player (1918–1991)

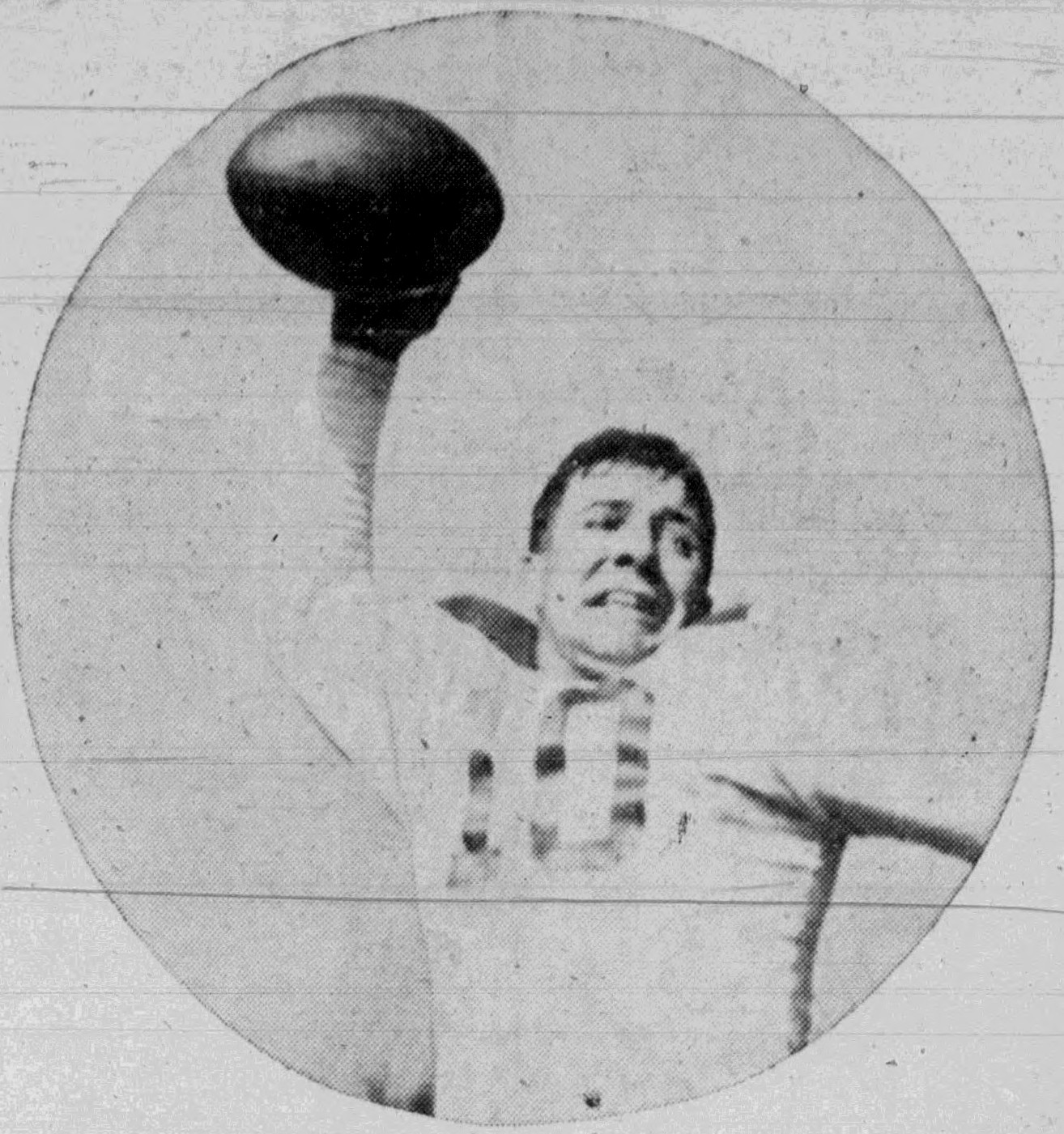
- Strausbaugh, circa 1941

No. 10, 48
- Position: Halfback

Personal information
- Born: February 25, 1918; Chillicothe, Ohio, U.S.
- Died: November 25, 1991 (aged 73); Chillicothe, Ohio, U.S.
- Listed height: 5 ft 9 in (1.75 m)
- Listed weight: 190 lb (86 kg)

Career information
- High school: Chillicothe
- College: Ohio State (1937–1940)
- NFL draft: 1941: 20th round, 186th overall pick

Career history
- Columbus Bulls (1941); Chicago Cardinals (1946)

Awards and highlights
- Second-team All-Big Ten (1939)

Career NFL statistics
- Rushing yards: 183
- Rushing average: 4.9
- Receptions: 5
- Receiving yards: 56
- Total touchdowns: 3
- Stats at Pro Football Reference

James Edwin Strausbaugh (February 25, 1918 – November 25, 1991) was an American professional football halfback who played one season with the Chicago Cardinals of the National Football League (NFL). He was selected by the Green Bay Packers in the 20th round of the 1941 NFL draft after playing college football at Ohio State University.

== Early life and college ==
James Edwin Strausbaugh was born on February 25, 1918, in Chillicothe, Ohio. He attended Chillicothe High School in Chillicothe.

Strausbaugh was a member of the Ohio State Buckeyes of Ohio State University from 1937 to 1940 and a three-year letterman from 1938 to 1940. He earned Associated Press second-team All-Big Ten honors in 1939.

== Professional career ==
Strasbaugh was selected by the Green Bay Packers in the 20th round, with the 186th overall pick, of the 1941 NFL draft. He played in six games, all starts, for the Columbus Bulls of the American Football League in 1941 and threw one touchdown. He then served in the United States Army Air Forces during World War II. Strasbaugh played football for the Keesler Field Fliers during the war.

Strasbaugh signed with the Chicago Cardinals in 1946. He appeared in all 11 games, starting one, for the Cardinals during the 1946 season, recording 37 carries for 183 yards and three touchdowns, five receptions for 56 yards, six kick returns for 104 yards, two punt returns for 34, and one pass completion for 35 yards. He became a free agent after the season.

== Personal life ==
Strasbaugh died on November 25, 1991, in Chillicothe.
