= Vic Marino =

All American football player (1918–2006)

- Marino, 1947

No. 34
- Position: Guard

Personal information
- Born: October 2, 1918; Columbus, Ohio, U.S.
- Died: January 7, 2006 (aged 87); Worthington, Ohio, U.S.
- Listed height: 5 ft 8 in (1.73 m)
- Listed weight: 205 lb (93 kg)

Career information
- High school: Rayen (OH)
- College: Ohio State

Career history
- Boston Bears (1940); Great Lakes Navy (1942); Oakland Giants (1945); Akron Bears (1946); Baltimore Colts (1947)

Awards and highlights
- First-team All-Big Ten (1939)

Career statistics
- Games: 13
- Stats at Pro Football Reference

Victor Irving Marino (October 2, 1918 – January 7, 2006), sometimes known as the "Little Dynamo", was an American football player who played at the guard position. He played college football for Ohio State from 1936 to 1939, service football for the undefeated 1942 Great Lakes Navy Bluejackets football team, and professional football for various clubs, including the 1947 Baltimore Colts. He was also injured while serving on the USS Maddox during the Allied invasion of Sicily.

== Early life ==
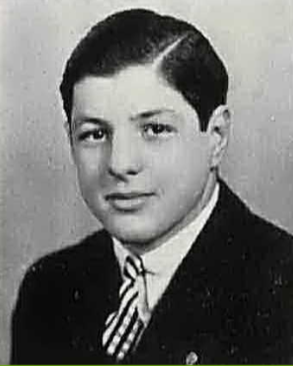
Marino in 1936.

Marino was born in Columbus, Ohio, in 1918. He attended Rayen High School in Youngstown, Ohio. He played college football for the Ohio State Buckeyes from 1936 to 1939. He helped lead the 1939 Ohio State Buckeyes football team to a Big Ten championship and was selected by the Big Ten coaches as a first-team guard on the Associated Press 1939 All-Big Ten Conference football team. He was also selected for the Midwest College All-Stars that played in a charity game against the Cleveland Rams.

== Professional football and military service ==
In 1940, he played professional football for the Boston Bears of the American Football League. He appeared in 10 games at guard for Boston, all of them as a starter.

He enlisted in the United States Navy in July 1941, five months before the Japanese attack on Pearl Harbor. He was initially assigned as an athletic trainer at the Great Lakes Naval Training Station and played for the undefeated 1942 Great Lakes Navy Bluejackets football team that was ranked No. 1 in the final AP Service Poll. In July 1943, he was an anti-aircraft gunner on the destroyer USS Maddox during the Allied invasion of Sicily and ended up with eight pieces of shrapnel in his body and a head wound when the Maddox was attacked and sunk by Nazi bombers. After the injuries, Marino was assigned to the physical education department at Naval Station Treasure Island.

In the fall of 1945, he played for the Oakland Giants of the Pacific Coast Football League. After the 1945 season, he signed to play professional football for the Chicago Bears but did not play for the team. He instead played for the Akron Bears of the American Football League in 1946. He also played professional football in the All-America Football Conference (AAFC) for the Baltimore Colts during the 1947 season. He appeared in a total of 13 AAFC games, four as a starter.

== Later life ==
Marino died in 2006 at age 87 at a nursing home in Worthington, Ohio.
