= Ohio State University Airport =

Airport in Columbus, United States of America

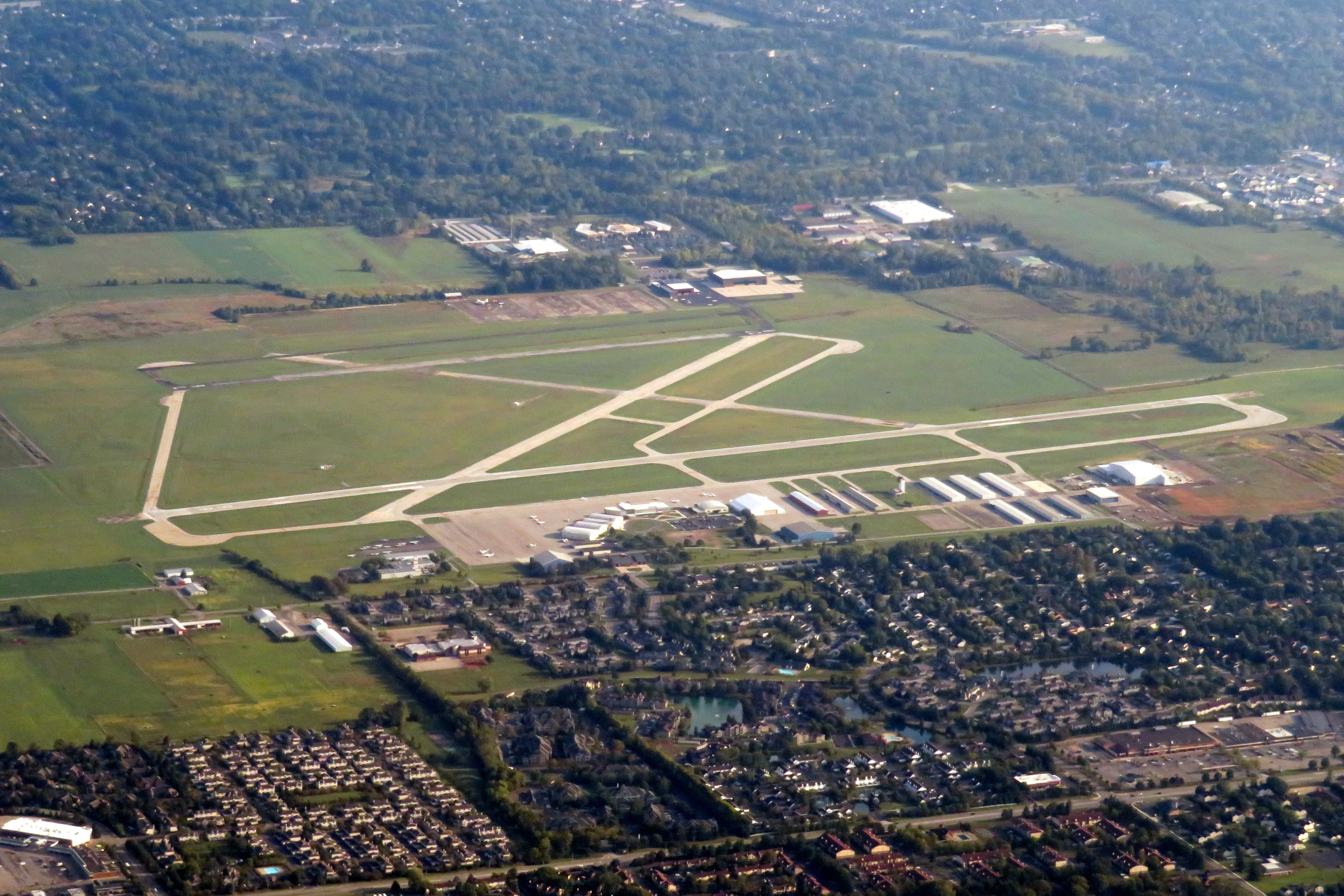
- IATA: OSU; ICAO: KOSU; FAA LID: OSU

Summary
- Airport type: Public
- Owner/Operator: Ohio State University
- Location: Columbus, Ohio
- Opened: 1943
- Time zone: UTC−05:00 (-5)
  - Summer (DST): UTC−04:00 (-4)
- Elevation AMSL: 905 ft (276 m)
- Coordinates: 40°04′47″N 083°04′23″W
- Website: www.osuairport.org

Map
- Location of airport in Ohio OSU (the United States)

Runways
Direction	Length		Surface
Direction	ft	m	Surface
9R/27L	5,004	1,525	Asphalt/Grooved
9L/27R	2,994	913	Asphalt
5/23	3,562	1,084	Asphalt

Helipads
Number	Length		Surface
Number	ft	m	Surface
H1	40	12	Asphalt

Statistics (2021)
- Aircraft operations: 77,745
- Based aircraft: 143
- Sources: FAA, airport website

Ohio State University Airport (IATA: OSU, ICAO: KOSU, FAA LID: OSU) is a public airport in Columbus, in Franklin County, Ohio, United States, 6 miles (9.7 km) northwest of Downtown Columbus. It is owned and operated by Ohio State University in Columbus. It is also known as the OSU Don Scott Airport, named after Donald E. Scott, an OSU alumnus who died during his training as a pilot in the United Kingdom during World War II. The airport's main entrance is located on West Case Road, and is easily accessible from OH-315 and Interstate 270.

The Ohio State University Airport serves the university while offering general aviation services for the public. It is one of 30 airports owned by universities across the country, but it is one of only three owned by a Tier One research institution. The airport is largely exempt from paying property taxes.

== History ==
The Ohio State University opened its first airport in 1917 to train cadets to build and fly aircraft for World War I. That airport was shut down in 1920 when Ohio Stadium was built on the site.

The university built a second airport soon after its first shut down, and it was among a number of universities that took part in the Civilian Pilot Training Program, sponsored by the Civil Aeronautics Administration, for the purpose of fostering private flying.

The current OSU Airport was constructed in 1943 as a flight training facility for military and civilian pilots, operated by the OSU School of Aviation. It became the headquarters for the Ohio Wing of the Civil Air Patrol in August 1944. The airport was used as a research location for crop dusting aircraft in the 1940s. A Piper J-3 Cub was used for testing until it crashed in 1957 and the project was halted.

It became a public-use airport in 1959 upon receipt of federal funding for runway improvements. The first jets were based at the airport in 1962.

The university started a partnership with the National Intercollegiate Flying Association (NIFA) in the 1960s. The Association's Safety in Flight Evaluation Conference has been held at The Ohio State University Airport ten times. The Ohio State University Airport has been home to NIFA's headquarters since 2015.

In the 1970s, the University used Douglas DC-3s at the airport to transport university sports teams, faculty, and administration to and from Columbus.

Discussions to sell the airport have been on and off since 1986.

The OSU Airport is now a self-supporting entity of the Ohio State University through the Department of Aerospace Engineering & Aviation.

The Department oversees all aspects of the Airport from Airport Management, to Fixed-Base Operations, to Airport Maintenance.

The Airport is also home to the OSU Department of Aerospace Engineering & Aviation Gas Turbine Laboratory, several facilities operated by the OSU College of Agriculture, the Ohio Department of Transportation's Office of Aviation, fourteen corporate flight departments, and four flying clubs. Per a partnership with NetJets, whose headquarters are in Columbus, the University's department of aviation also founded the Ohio State University Center for Aviation Studies, which provides funding for research projects and student scholarships and fellowships as well as conducting economic and public policy studies in technical projects.

The OSU Airport is a Part 139 Certificated Airport, serving as a general aviation reliever for the nearby John Glenn Columbus International Airport. It is the base for the Ohio State Highway Patrol's Aviation Section and the Ohio Department of Transportation's Office of Aviation.

=== Historical airline service ===
In August 1975, the US Civil Aeronautics Board, the now-defunct Federal agency that, at the time, regulated almost all airline service, approved Wright Air Lines to fly from Cleveland Burke Lakefront Airport to Columbus via Don Scott Airport. At the time, Wright flew 44-passenger piston-powered Convair 440 aircraft. The new service was not well received by Ohio State or the airport's neighbors and they were able to force Wright out, the service lasting only from September 29 to December 15. Wright moved to Port Columbus International Airport – today’s John Glenn International Airport.

== Facilities and aircraft ==
=== Facilities ===
The airport has three runways. Runway 9R/27L is the airport's main runway. It measures 5,004 x 100 ft (1525 x 30 m) and is paved with asphalt. Runway 9L/27R runs parallel to it; it measures 2994 x 100 ft (913 x 30 m) and is paved with asphalt. The third runway, designated as runway 5/23, measures 3562 x 100 ft (1086 x 30 m) and is also paved with asphalt.

The airport also has a helipad for helicopter operations. Designated as helipad H1, it measures 40 x 40 ft (12 x 12 m) and is paved with asphalt.

In 2020, the airport's main runway received rehabilitations to continue offering safe operations. The airport's master plan includes a plan to expand runway 9R/27L to 6,000 feet to help corporate aviation departments fly further non-stop from the airport.

The airport has a fixed-base operator that offers both avgas and Jet A fuel as well as amenities such as general maintenance, catering, a crew lounge, snooze rooms, showers, a courtesy car, and more. The FBO unveiled a new $15 million terminal building in 2018, which received funding in large part from a $10 million donation. It also added dozens of new hangars to house more airplanes, and it is developing a 50-acre corporate airpark.

=== Aircraft ===
Based on the 12-month period ending December 31, 2021, the airport has 77,745 annual aircraft operations, an average of 213 per day. This includes 79% general aviation, 21% air taxi, and <1% military. The airport generally ranks in the top five airports in Ohio in terms of the number of take-offs and landings, along with Cleveland Hopkins, John Glenn Columbus, Dayton, and Cincinnati Lunken. For the same time period, there were 143 aircraft based at the airport: 118 single-engine and 10 multi-engine airplanes as well as 11 jets and 4 helicopters.

== Accidents and incidents ==
- In 1967, the crew of a TWA Boeing 707 mistook the Ohio State University Airport for Port Columbus International Airport (now known as John Glenn Columbus International Airport). After shuttling all passengers and baggage to Port Columbus, and removing all galley equipment and seats, the plane was light enough to depart for the larger airport across town.
- On September 30, 1988, a Piper Aerostar crashed after taking off from the airport, killing the pilot, racecar driver Al Holbert.

== See also ==
- List of airports in Ohio
