= 1939 Chicago Maroons football team =

American college football season

1939 Chicago Maroons football
- Conference: Big Ten Conference
- Record: 2–6 (0–3 Big Ten)
- Head coach: Clark Shaughnessy (7th season)
- MVP: Hobert Wasam
- Home stadium: Stagg Field

1939 Big Ten Conference football standings
	Conf.					Overall
Team	W		L		T	W		L		T
No. 15 Ohio State $	5	–	1	–	0	6	–	2	–	0
No. 9 Iowa	4	–	1	–	1	6	–	1	–	1
No. 20 Michigan	3	–	2	–	0	6	–	2	–	0
Purdue	2	–	1	–	2	3	–	3	–	2
Northwestern	3	–	2	–	1	3	–	4	–	1
Illinois	3	–	3	–	0	3	–	4	–	1
Minnesota	2	–	3	–	1	3	–	4	–	1
Indiana	2	–	3	–	0	2	–	4	–	2
Wisconsin	0	–	5	–	1	1	–	6	–	1
Chicago	0	–	3	–	0	2	–	6	–	0
$ – Conference champion; Rankings from AP Poll

The 1939 Chicago Maroons football team was an American football team that represented the University of Chicago during the 1939 Big Ten Conference football season. In their seventh and final season under head coach Clark Shaughnessy, the Maroons compiled a 2–6 record, finished in last place in the Big Ten Conference, and were outscored by their opponents by a combined total of 308 to 37. Chicago's two victories came against Oberlin and Wabash. Against stronger opponents, the team was soundly defeated, 85–0 against Michigan, and 61–0 against both Ohio State and Harvard, 47–0 against Virginia, and 46–0 against Illinois.

Chicago was ranked at No. 434 in the final Litkenhous Ratings for 1939. The 1939 season was described in the press as the worst season in Chicago Maroons football history. The school's academic demands had greatly reduced the personnel available to field a quality football team, and the Maroons had not won a game against a Big Ten opponent since 1936.

In December 1939, after 48 seasons of competition, the University of Chicago's board of trustees announced that, the school would no longer field a football team.

== Schedule ==
Date	Opponent	Site	Result	Attendance	Source
September 30	Beloit*	Stagg Field; Chicago, IL	L 0–6	5,000	
October 7	Wabash*	Stagg Field; Chicago, IL	W 12–2		
October 14	Harvard*	Stagg Field; Chicago, IL	L 0–61		
October 21	No. 6 Michigan	Stagg Field; Chicago, IL (rivalry)	L 0–85	4,000	
November 4	at Virginia*	Scott Stadium; Charlottesville, VA	L 0–47	6,500	
November 11	No. 9 Ohio State	Stagg Field; Chicago, IL	L 0–61	2,000	
November 18	Oberlin*	Stagg Field; Chicago, IL	W 25–0	3,000	
November 25	Illinois	Stagg Field; Chicago, IL	L 0–46	4,500	
*Non-conference game; Rankings from AP Poll released prior to the game
