= 1939 Indiana Hoosiers football team =

American college football season

1939 Indiana Hoosiers football
- Conference: Big Ten Conference
- Record: 2–4–2 (2–3 Big Ten)
- Head coach: Bo McMillin (6th season)
- MVP: Jim Logan
- Captain: Jim Logan
- Home stadium: Memorial Stadium

1939 Big Ten Conference football standings
	Conf.					Overall
Team	W		L		T	W		L		T
No. 15 Ohio State $	5	–	1	–	0	6	–	2	–	0
No. 9 Iowa	4	–	1	–	1	6	–	1	–	1
No. 20 Michigan	3	–	2	–	0	6	–	2	–	0
Purdue	2	–	1	–	2	3	–	3	–	2
Northwestern	3	–	2	–	1	3	–	4	–	1
Illinois	3	–	3	–	0	3	–	4	–	1
Minnesota	2	–	3	–	1	3	–	4	–	1
Indiana	2	–	3	–	0	2	–	4	–	2
Wisconsin	0	–	5	–	1	1	–	6	–	1
Chicago	0	–	3	–	0	2	–	6	–	0
$ – Conference champion; Rankings from AP Poll

The 1939 Indiana Hoosiers football team was an American football team that represented the Indiana Hoosiers in the 1939 Big Ten Conference football season. In their sixth year under head coach Bo McMillan, the Hoosiers compiled a 2–4–2 record (2–3 against conference opponents) and finished in eighth place in the Big Ten Conference.

Indiana was not ranked in the final AP poll, but it was ranked at No. 50 in the 1939 Williamson System ratings.

The Hoosiers played their home games at Memorial Stadium in Bloomington, Indiana.

== Schedule ==
Date	Opponent	Site	Result	Attendance	Source
September 30	Nebraska^{†}*	Memorial Stadium; Bloomington, IN	T 7–7	18,000	
October 7	at Iowa	Iowa Stadium; Iowa City, IA	L 29–32	17,500	
October 14	at Wisconsin	Camp Randall Stadium; Madison, WI	W 14–0	19,000	
October 21	at Illinois	Memorial Stadium; Champaign, IL (rivalry)	W 7–6	20,000	
November 4	at No. 14 Ohio State	Ohio Stadium; Columbus, OH	L 0–24	40,872	
November 11	at Fordham*	Polo Grounds; Bronx, NY	L 0–13	19,279	
November 18	at Michigan State	Macklin Field; East Lansing, MI (rivalry)	T 7–7		
November 25	Purdue	Memorial Stadium; Bloomington, IN (Old Oaken Bucket)	L 6–7	25,000	
*Non-conference game; ^{†}Homecoming; Rankings from AP Poll released prior to the game
