= Erv Prasse =

American multi-sport athlete (1917–2005)

Personal information
- Born: December 1, 1917 Chicago, Illinois, U.S.
- Died: June 18, 2005 (aged 87) Naperville, Illinois, U.S.
- Listed height: 6 ft 2 in (1.88 m)
- Listed weight: 195 lb (88 kg)

Career information
- High school: Carl Schurz (Chicago, Illinois)
- College: Iowa (1937–1940)
- Playing career: 1940–1946
- Position: Small forward / shooting guard

Career history
- 1940–1942, 1945–1946: Oshkosh All-Stars

Career highlights
- 2× NBL champion (1941, 1942); Second-team All-American (1939); 2× First-team All-Big Ten (1938, 1939)

Erwin Theodore "Erv" Prasse (December 1, 1917 – June 18, 2005) was an American multi-sport standout athlete in the 1930s and 1940s, notably in football, basketball and baseball. In college he competed for the University of Iowa where he was a second-team All-American and captain of Iowa's 1939 "Ironmen" football team. Professionally, Prasse played basketball for the Oshkosh All-Stars in the National Basketball League (NBL), winning two league championships in 1941 and 1942. Prasse also played minor league baseball for two years within the St. Louis Cardinals' farm system.

A native of Chicago, Illinois, Prasse attended Carl Schurz High School.

== Athletic career ==
=== Football ===
Prasse played the end position. Iowa struggled in his first two varsity football seasons, compiling a 2–13–1 record spanning 1937 and 1938. Prasse was an All-Big Ten selection as a junior in 1938, and he was elected captain of the Hawkeye football squad in 1939.

1939 season

In Iowa's Big Ten conference-opening game, Prasse set an Iowa Stadium record by catching three touchdown passes from Nile Kinnick in a 32–29 victory. His third and final touchdown catch came on fourth down with only minutes remaining in the game. His three touchdown catches remained an Iowa Stadium record until 2005, when Ed Hinkel caught four touchdowns in a game against Minnesota. The 1939 Hawkeyes were nicknamed the "Ironmen" because several players were forced to play all 60 minutes of many games. Prasse was one of those Ironmen – he played all 60 minutes of each of Iowa's last five games that season. The Hawkeyes finished the year with a 6–1–1 record and were ranked ninth in the country. While Prasse's teammate, Kinnick, won the Heisman Trophy, Prasse was named a second-team All-American by United Press International.

Prasse was selected by the Detroit Lions in the 1940 NFL draft (11th round, 96th overall) but never ended up playing in the league.

He was inducted into the University of Iowa Athletics Hall of Fame in its first year in 1989. In 1989, Iowa fans selected an all-time University of Iowa football team during the 100th anniversary celebration of Iowa football, and Prasse was an honorable mention selection.

=== Basketball ===
During the winters at Iowa, Prasse competed for the school's men's basketball team. He earned three varsity letters (1938–1940). After college, he played in the NBL for the Oshkosh All-Stars for parts of the 1940–41 and 1941–42 seasons, winning championships in both, before having to fight in World War II. When the war ended he returned to professional basketball, once again competing for the All-Stars in part of the 1945–46 season. For his professional career he averaged 1.9 points per game.

=== Baseball ===
After completing his collegiate career at Iowa, Prasse played two years of professional baseball within the St. Louis Cardinals' organization as a second baseman and third baseman. In 1940 he competed for the Asheville Tourists of the Piedmont League and the Springfield Cardinals of the Western Association. In 1941 he again competed for the Asheville Tourists. His baseball career ended due to an injury sustained during World War II in which his throwing arm was shot. During his 189-game career, Prasse compiled a .240 batting average and hit 10 home runs.

== Personal ==
During World War II, Prasse became an officer in the United States Army. He landed on Omaha Beach on D-Day and was later shot in the arm while on reconnaissance in Germany. That injury earned him the Purple Heart from the Army. He then retired from sports and returned to private life after the war.

Prasse died on June 18, 2005, in Edward Hospital in Naperville, Illinois, from head wounds suffered in a fall earlier that week. He was 87 years old.
