= 1939 All-America college football team =

Official list of the best college football players of 1939

The 1939 All-America college football team is composed of college football players who were selected as All-Americans by various organizations and writers that chose All-America college football teams in 1939. The nine selectors recognized by the NCAA as "official" for the 1939 season are (1) Collier's Weekly, as selected by Grantland Rice, (2) the Associated Press, (3) the United Press, (4) the All-America Board, (5) the International News Service (INS), (6) Liberty magazine, (7) the Newspaper Enterprise Association (NEA), (8) Newsweek, and (9) the Sporting News.

Two players, USC guard Harry Smith and Cornell tackle Nick Drahos, were unanimously chosen by all nine official selectors. Two other players, Iowa halfback Nile Kinnick and Michigan halfback Tom Harmon were selected as first-team All-Americans by eight of the nine official selectors, with Kinnick winning the Heisman Trophy in 1939 and Harmon winning it in 1940.

== Consensus All-Americans ==
For the year 1939, the NCAA recognizes nine published All-American teams as "official" designations for purposes of its consensus determinations. The following chart identifies the NCAA-recognized consensus All-Americans and displays which first-team designations they received.

Name	Position	School	Number	Official	Other
Harry Smith	Guard	USC	9/9	AAB, AP, CO, INS, LIB, NEA, NW, SN, UP	BL, CP, CW, LIFE, NYS, WC
Nick Drahos	Tackle	Cornell	9/9	AAB, AP, CO, INS, LIB, NEA, NW, SN, UP	CP, CW, LIFE, WC
Tom Harmon	Halfback	Michigan	8/9	AAB, AP, CO, INS, LIB, NW, SN, UP	BL, CP, CW, LIFE, NYS, WC
Nile Kinnick	Halfback	Iowa	8/9	AAB, AP, CO, INS, NEA, NW, SN, UP	BL, CP, CW, WC
John Kimbrough	Fullback	Texas A&M	7/9	AAB, AP, INS, LIB, NEA, NW, UP	BL, CP, LIFE, WC
Esco Sarkkinen	End	Ohio State	5/9	AAB, CO, NEA, NW, UP	CP, NYS, WC
Ken Kavanaugh	End	LSU	5/9	INS, LIB, NW, SN, UP	BL, CW, LIFE
Ed Molinski	Guard	Tennessee	5/9	AAB, AP, CO, LIB, NEA	--
George Cafego	Quarterback	Tennessee	4/9	INS, NW, SN, UP	CW, LIFE
John Schiechl	Center	Santa Clara	3/9	AAB, AP, CO, NEA	CP, WC
Paul Christman	Quarterback	Missouri	4/9	AAB, CO, NEA, SN	CW, WC
Harley McCollum	Tackle	Tulane	3/9	AP, LIB, NEA	--

== All-American selections for 1939 ==
=== Ends ===
- Esco Sarkkinen, Ohio State (AAB; AP-2; CO-1; NEA-1; NW-1; UP-1; CP-1; NYS-1; WC-1)
- Ken Kavanaugh, LSU (College Football Hall of Fame) (AP-2; INS-1; NW-1; LIB; SN; UP-1; BL; CP-2; CW-1; LIFE-1)
- Bud Kerr, Notre Dame (AAB; AP-1; INS-2; NEA-1; SN; UP-2; BL; CP-2; CW-1; LIFE-1; NYS-2; WC-1)
- Ralph Wenzel, Tulane (UP-3; CP-1; CW-2; LIFE-2; NYS-1)
- Paul Severin, North Carolina (AP-1; UP-3; NEA-2)
- Harlan Gustafson, Penn (AP-3; INS-1; CW-2; LIFE-2)
- Pop Ivy, Oklahoma (AP-3; CO-1)
- Dave Rankin, Purdue (LIB)
- Erwin Prasse, Iowa (UP-2; CP-3)
- Bob Ison, Georgia Tech (CP-3; NEA-3; NYS-2)
- Bob Nowaskey, George Washington (NEA-3)
- Hal Newman, Alabama (NEA-2)
- Bill Anahu, Santa Clara (INS-2)

=== Tackles ===
- Nick Drahos, Cornell (College Football Hall of Fame) (AAB; AP-1; CO-1; INS-1; LIB; NEA-1; NW-1; SN; UP-1; CP-1; CW-1; LIFE-1; WC-1)
- Harley McCollum, Tulane (AP-1; INS-2; NEA-1; LIB; CP-3)
- Harry Stella, Army (AP-2; INS-1; NW-1; UP-1; CW-2; LIFE-2)
- Joe Boyd, Texas A&M (AP-3; CO-1; NEA-2; SN; UP-2; BL; CP-2; CW-1; LIFE-2; NYS-1)
- Cliff Duggan, Oklahoma (INS-2; NEA-3; UP-2; BL; CP-1; LIFE-1; CW-2; NYS-1)
- Lee Artoe, California (AP-2)
- Ty Coon, North Carolina State (NEA-2; NYS-2)
- Win Pedersen, Minnesota (AP-3; UP-3)
- Mike Enich, Iowa (NEA-3)
- Phil Gaspar, USC (UP-3)
- Bob Tierney, Princeton (CP-2)
- Jim Reeder, Illinois (AAB; NYS-2; WC-1)

=== Guards ===
- Harry Smith, USC (College Football Hall of Fame) (AAB; AP-1; CO-1; INS-1; LIB; NEA-1; NW-1; SN; UP-1; BL; CP-1; CW-1; LIFE-1; NYS-1; WC-1)
- Ed Molinski, Tennessee (College Football Hall of Fame) (AAB; AP-1; CO-1; LIB; NEA-1; UP-2; CP-3; WC-1)
- Bob Suffridge, Tennessee (College Football Hall of Fame) (INS-1; NEA-3; NW-1; SN; UP-1; BL; CP-1; CW-1; LIFE-1; NYS-1)
- Marshall Robnett, Texas A&M (AP-2; UP-3)
- Jim Turner, Holy Cross (UP-3; CP-2; INS-2; NYS-2)
- Elbie Schultz, Oregon State (AP-3; CP-3; CW-2; LIFE-2; NYS-2)
- Allen Johnson, Duke (INS-2; CW-2; LIFE-2)
- Mel Brewer, Illinois (UP-2)
- Warren Alfson, Nebraska (AP-2)
- Bob Waldorf, Missouri (NEA-2)
- Tommy O'Boyle, Tulane (NEA-2)
- Jack Sommers, UCLA (CP-2)
- Frank Ribar, Duke (AP-3)
- Joseph Enzler, Portland (NEA-3)
- Carl Nery, Duquesne (CP-3)

=== Centers ===
- John Schiechl, Santa Clara (AAB; AP-1; UP-2; CO-1; CP-1; INS-2; NEA-1; NYS-2; WC-1)
- Jack Haman, Northwestern (INS-1; NW-1; SN; UP-1; BL; CP-3; CW-1; LIFE-2)
- Cary Cox, Alabama (CP-2; LIB)
- Archie Kodros, Michigan (UP-3; CW-2; LIFE-1)
- Bulldog Turner, Hardin-Simmons (NEA-3; NYS-1)
- Frank Finneran, Cornell (AP-3; NEA-2)
- Robert Nelson, Baylor (AP-2)

=== Quarterbacks ===
- George Cafego, Tennessee (INS-1; AP-2; NEA-2 [fb]; NW-1; SN; UP-1; CP-2; CW-1; LIFE-1)
- Paul Christman, Missouri (AAB; AP-2; CO-1; CP-2; INS-2; NEA-1; SN; UP-2; CW-1; NYS-2; WC-1)
- Jimmy McFadden, Clemson (AP-1)
- Walter Matuszczak, Cornell (NYS-1)
- Don Scott, Ohio State (AP-3; UP-3; CP-3; NEA-2; LIB)
- Snuffy Stirnweiss, North Carolina (CP-2; NEA-3)

=== Halfbacks ===
- Tom Harmon, Michigan (College Football Hall of Fame) (AAB; AP-1; UP-1; CO-1; CINS-1; NEA-3; NW-1; LIB; SN; BL; CP-1; CW-1; LIFE-1; NYS-1 [fb]; WC-1)
- Nile Kinnick, Iowa (College Football Hall of Fame) (AAB; AP-1; UP-1; CO-1; INS-1; NEA-1; NW-1; SN; BL; CP-1; CW-1; LIFE-2; NYS-1; WC-1)
- Banks McFadden, Clemson (College Football Hall of Fame) (UP-3; CO-1 [fb]; CP-3; NEA-1)
- George McAfee, Duke (College and Pro Football Hall of Fame) (AP-2; UP-2; CP-2; NEA-2; NYS-1; BL; LIFE-2)
- Kenny Washington, UCLA (College Football Hall of Fame) (AP-2; UP-2; CP-3; INS-2; NEA-2; CW-2; NYS-2; LIB; LIFE-1)
- Grenny Lansdell, USC (AP-3; CP-1; CW-2)
- Dick Cassiano, Pitt (NEA-3; UP-3; CW-2; LIFE-2)
- Jim Lelanne, North Carolina (INS-2; LIFE-2)
- Beryl Clark, Oklahoma (INS-2)
- Bob Hoffman, USC (NYS-2)
- Jack Crain, Texas (AP-3)

=== Fullbacks ===
- John Kimbrough, Texas A&M (College Football Hall of Fame) (AAB; AP-1; INS-1; NEA-1; NW-1; LIB; UP-1; BL; CP-1; CW-2; LIFE-1; NYS-2; WC-1)
- Milt Piepul, Notre Dame (UP-2)
- Dom Principe, Fordham (AP-3; UP-3; CP-3; NEA-3)

== Key ==
Bold = Consensus All-American

- -1 – First-team selection
- -2 – Second-team selection
- -3 – Third-team selection

=== Official selectors ===
- AAB = All-America Board
- AP = Associated Press
- CO = Collier's Weekly, selected by Grantland Rice
- INS = International News Service
- LIB = Liberty magazine
- NEA = Newspaper Enterprise Association
- NW = Newsweek, based on a consensus of five All-America teams chosen by the UP, the New York Daily News, Christy Walsh All-America Football Board, and the New York Sun
- SN = The Sporting News
- UP = United Press

=== Other selectors ===
- BL = Boys' Life, All-America, All-Scout team.
- CP = Central Press Association, selected by the captains of more than 60 football teams across the country
- CW = Collegiate Writers: selected by a national poll of 67 collegiate sports writers in 36 states
- LIFE = Life magazine selected by NBC announcer Bill Stern
- NYS = New York Sun
- WC = Walter Camp Football Foundation

== See also ==
- 1939 Little All-America college football team
- 1939 All-Big Six Conference football team
- 1939 All-Big Ten Conference football team
- 1939 All-Pacific Coast Conference football team
- 1939 All-SEC football team
- 1939 All-Southwest Conference football team
