= Steve Andrako =

American football player (1915–1980)

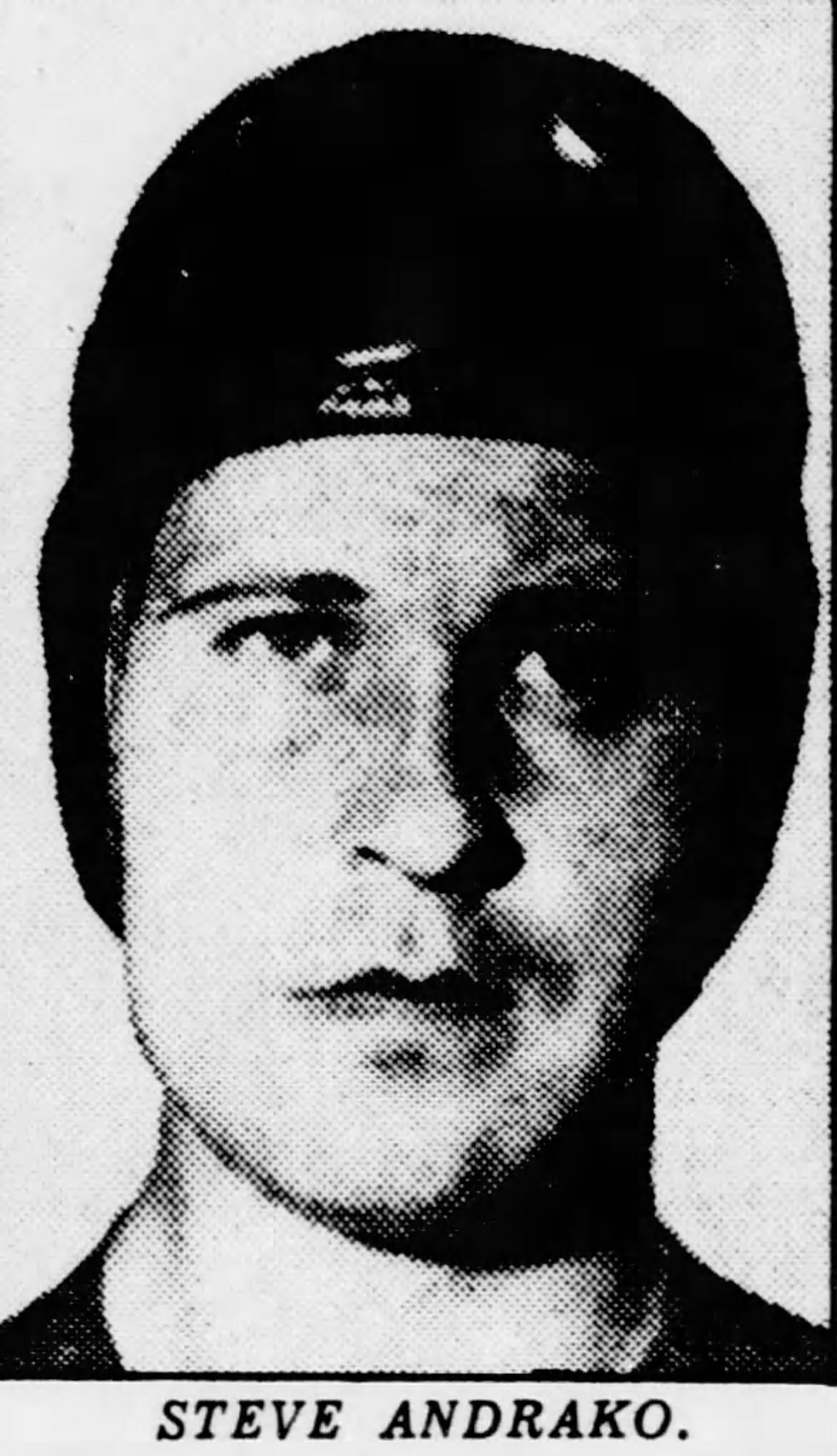
- Andrako in 1940

No. 29
- Positions: Center, linebacker

Personal information
- Born: September 11, 1915; Braddock, Pennsylvania, U.S.
- Died: November 30, 1980 (aged 65); Half Moon Bay, California, U.S.
- Listed height: 6 ft 0 in (1.83 m)
- Listed weight: 210 lb (95 kg)

Career information
- College: Ohio State
- NFL draft: 1940: 17th round, 158th overall pick

Career history
- Washington Redskins (1940)

Awards and highlights
- Second-team All-Big Ten (1939)

Career NFL statistics
- Games played: 5
- Stats at Pro Football Reference

Steven Francis Andrako (originally Andrejko) (September 11, 1915 – November 30, 1980) was an American professional football center in the National Football League (NFL) for the Washington Redskins. He played college football for the Ohio State Buckeyes. He was captain of the 1939 Ohio State Buckeyes football team, was also selected as the Buckeyes' most valuable player, and finished second in the 1939 voting for the Chicago Tribune Silver Football. He was then selected in the 17th round of the 1940 NFL draft.
