= Milo Sukup =

American football player and coach (1917–1983)

No. 59
- Position: Guard

Personal information
- Born: July 9, 1917; Muskegon Heights, Michigan, U.S.
- Died: January 3, 1983 (aged 65); Grand Rapids, Michigan, U.S.
- Listed height: 5 ft 8 in (1.73 m)
- Listed weight: 190 lb (86 kg)

Career information
- High school: Muskegon Heights High School
- College: Michigan

Career history
- 1938–1940: Michigan

Milo Frederick Sukup (July 9, 1917 – January 3, 1983) was an American football player and coach. He played college football for the University of Michigan from 1938 to 1940, where he was the running guard and a key blocker for Heisman Trophy winner Tom Harmon. He sustained a head injury late in his senior year that ended his football career. He was the head football coach and athletic director at Union High School in Grand Rapids, Michigan from 1942 to 1971.

== Family ==
Sukup was born in Muskegon Heights, Michigan in 1917. His parents, John and Anna Sukup, spoke Slovak and identified their homeland in the 1910 Census as "Hun Slovakia." His mother emigrated to the United States in 1897 and his father in 1899. His father worked as a core maker in an iron foundry. Sukup had a brother, John, who was seven years older and two sisters, Anna and Lilian.

== High school ==
Sukup attended Muskegon Heights High School where he won 12 varsity letters in football, basketball, baseball and track and was selected as an all-state player in both basketball and football. As the fullback for his high school football team, Sukup led Muskegon Heights to 27 consecutive wins and three state titles from 1933 to 1936.

== University of Michigan ==
Sukup from Oakland Tribune, September 1940

In 1937, he enrolled at the University of Michigan where he played college football as a guard for the Michigan Wolverines football team from 1938 to 1940. As a sophomore in 1938, he was alternated with All-American Ralph Heikkinen and garnered attention after the Penn game in which he recovered a blocked punt for a touchdown and made what was described as "a thundering block" that freed Paul Kromer to return another punt for a touchdown. Sukup became a starter in the 1939 and 1940 seasons. In games in which Sukup was a starter, the Wolverines outscored opponents 349 to 107 and compiled a record of 11 wins and 2 losses.

Sukup was the running guard and blocker for three backs who were later inducted into the College Football Hall of Fame: Tom Harmon, Forest Evashevski and Bob Westfall. During Harmon's Heisman Trophy-winning season, he publicly praised Sukup and fellow guard Ralph Fritz as "two big reasons for Harmon." While taking no credit away from Harmon, Michigan's head coach Fritz Crisler noted that "Harmon gets exceptional blocking" from Evashevsi, Fritz and Sukup. Walter L. Johns, sports editor of the Central Press Association, called Fritz and Sukup "two husky boys who could make any college team in the country."

In a November 1940 game against Illinois, Sukup suffered a blow to the head while blocking for Harmon. He was knocked unconscious, suffered from temporary amnesia and was later hospitalized for several days after suffering recurring headaches. Sukup was propped up in a bed at University Hospital when the Wolverines left to play Minnesota and listened by radio from his hospital bed as the team suffered its only loss of the season. He missed the last three games of the season due to the concussion and did not compete further as a football player. Some have concluded that Sukup was on track for selection as an All-American until the injury ended his season.

== Later life ==
Sukup became the football coach and athletic director at Union High School in Grand Rapids, Michigan from 1942 to 1971. At Union High, Sukup ran the single wing offense he had learned from Fritz Crisler at Michigan. In 1948, Sukup led Union High to an undefeated season and a Class A state championship. Upon his retirement in 1972, the Michigan House of Representatives passed a resolution of tribute to him. Sukup died in January 1983 at Grand Rapids, Michigan. He was posthumously inducted into the Muskegon Area Sports Hall of Fame in 1990.

== See also ==
- 1939 Michigan Wolverines football team
- 1940 Michigan Wolverines football team
