= Mel Brewer =

American football player and coach (1918–1977)

- From the Illio, 1940

Biographical details
- Born: October 5, 1918; Carbondale, Illinois, U.S.
- Died: October 27, 1977 (aged 59); Carbondale, Illinois, U.S.

Playing career

Football
- 1937–1939: Illinois
- Position: Guard

Coaching career (HC unless noted)

Football
- 1940: Wabash (line)
- 1941: DePauw (backfield)
- 1944–1946: Illinois Wesleyan
- 1947: Illinois (freshmen)

Basketball
- 1944–1945: Illinois Wesleyan

Baseball
- 1941: Wabash

Administrative career (AD unless noted)
- 1957-1967: Illinois (Assistant AD)
- 1968-1977: Southern Illinois Carbondale (Director of service enterprises)

Head coaching record
- Overall: 12–10 (football); 8–8 (basketball); 7–7 (baseball)

Accomplishments and honors

Awards
- Second-team All-American (1939); 2× Second-team All-Big Ten (1937, 1939)

Melvin Clay Brewer (October 5, 1918 – October 26, 1977) was an American football player and coach. He played college football at the University of Illinois where he was selected as a second-team All-American in 1939.

Brewer grew up in Carbondale, Illinois, where he was a star athlete in both basketball and football. After graduating high school in 1936, Brewer enrolled at the University of Illinois where he played college football for the Illinois Fighting Illini football team from 1937 to 1939. He was the captain of Illinois' 1939 football team, and he was selected by the United Press as a second-team guard on the 1939 College Football All-America Team.

In December 1939, Brewer was drafted by the Green Bay Packers in the 1940 NFL draft (139th pick). Instead of playing professional football, Brewer accepted a position as the head baseball coach and assistant football coach (line coach) at Wabash College during the 1940–41 academic year. In May 1941, he was classified as unfit for military service due to a silver plate that had been inserted in one knee after a football injury during his sophomore year. He was the backfield coach at DePauw University during the 1941 football season.

In 1942, Brewer enlisted in the United States Navy but was discharged due to his recurring knee injury. During the 1943–44 academic year, he returned to the University of Illinois as a staff member in the school of physical education. He next served as the head football coach at Illinois Wesleyan University from 1944 to 1946, compiling a record of 12–10. In 1947, Brewer returned to the University of Illinois as the freshman football coach.

Brewer would ultimately ascend to the position of assistant athletic director in 1957. In November 1966, then-AD Douglas R. Mills resigned from his position, which Brewer coveted. When it became clear that the football head coach at the time, Pete Elliott, would win the position, Brewer turned over documents to then-UI president David Henry, ultimately leading to the slush fund scandal.

The scandal would ultimately lead to Brewer leaving the university. He then took a job as Director of service enterprises at Southern Illinois University Carbondale. Brewer would hold the position until he died of cancer in 1977.
