= Jim Reeder (American football tackle) =

American football player (1919–1965)

Profile
- Position: Tackle

Personal information
- Born: September 5, 1919; Tuscola, Illinois, U.S.
- Died: April 18, 1965 (aged 45); Champaign, Illinois, U.S.
- Listed weight: 215 lb (98 kg)

Career information
- College: Illinois

Awards and highlights
- First-team All-American (1939); First-team All-Big Ten (1939)

James William Reeder (September 5, 1919 – April 18, 1965) was an American football player. He played college football for the Illinois Fighting Illini football team from 1938 to 1939 and was selected by both the All-America Board and the Walter Camp Football Foundation as a first-team tackle on the 1939 College Football All-America Team. He was invited to play in the East–West Shrine Game, but he declined to participate so that he could focus on his studies. In December 1939, Reeder was drafted by the Green Bay Packers in the 1940 NFL draft (189th pick), but Reeder stated at the time that he did not intend to play professional football unless he received a reasonable offer.
