= Mike Enich =

American football player (1918–1978)

Personal information
- Born: September 20, 1918; Boone, Iowa, U.S.
- Died: January 9, 1978 (aged 59)

Career information
- College: Iowa (1939–1940)

Awards and highlights
- First-team All-American (1940); Third-team All-American (1939); First-team All-Big Ten (1939); Second-team All-Big Ten (1940)

Mike Enich (September 20, 1918 – January 9, 1978) was an American college football player for the University of Iowa. He was a member of Iowa's 1939 "Ironmen" team and a first team All-American in 1940.

== Playing career ==
Of Serbian parentage, "Iron" Mike Enich graduated from Boone High School in 1936. He played fullback in high school, but Coach Eddie Anderson moved him to the tackle position before the 1939 season. The 1939 Hawkeyes were nicknamed the "Ironmen", because several players were forced to play all 60 minutes of many games. As a junior in 1939, Enich played six complete 60-minute games for the Hawkeyes. He was a third team All-American in 1939, as the Hawkeyes finished the year with a 6-1-1 record and ranked ninth in the country.

As a senior in 1940, Enich was named team captain and MVP of the football team. He earned first team All-American honors that year and played in the East-West Shrine Game in 1941. Following his graduation, he was accepted in officers' school in the United States Marine Corps. For the next five years, he served with distinction in the South Pacific theater. He received severe chest wounds at the Battle of Okinawa in 1945, for which he was awarded the Purple Heart.

== Legal career and honors ==
Enich returned to the University of Iowa where he attended law school, receiving his juris doctor degree in 1948. In 1963, he was elected Poweshiek County attorney. He was appointed to the district court bench in November 1971 by Governor Robert D. Ray.

Enich was inducted into the Iowa Sports Hall of Fame in 1983 and the University of Iowa Athletics Hall of Fame in 1990. In 1989, Iowa fans selected an all-time University of Iowa football team during the 100th anniversary celebration of Iowa football, and Mike Enich was selected as an offensive tackle.
