= Hal Van Every =

American football player (1918–2007)

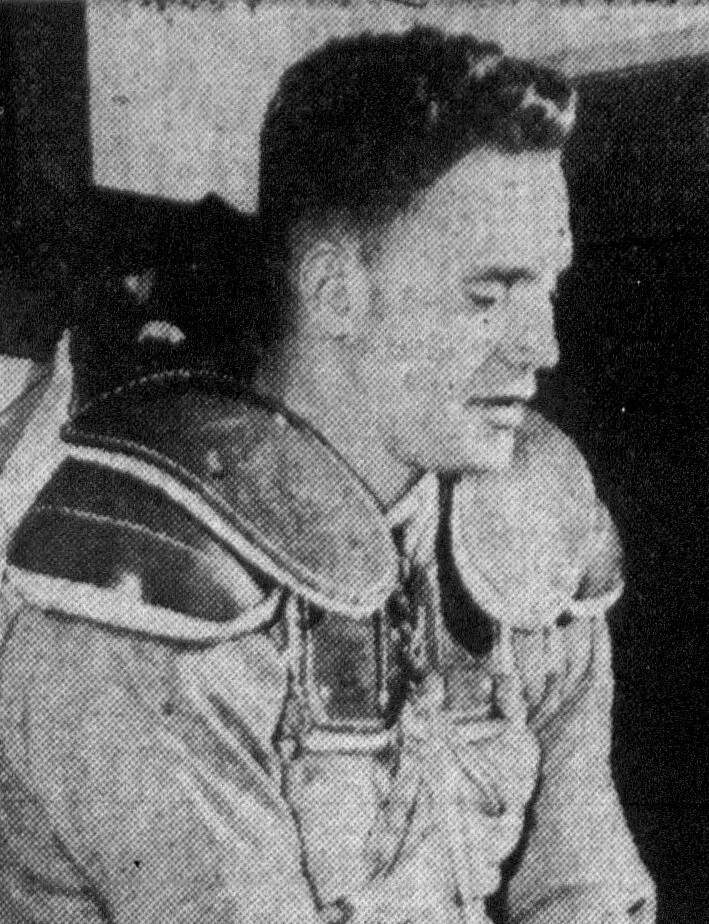
- Van Every, circa 1942

No. 36
- Positions: Halfback, defensive back

Personal information
- Born: February 10, 1918; Minnetonka Beach, Minnesota, U.S.
- Died: August 11, 2007 (aged 89); Minneapolis, Minnesota, U.S.
- Listed height: 6 ft 0 in (1.83 m)
- Listed weight: 195 lb (88 kg)

Career information
- High school: Wayzata (MN)
- College: Minnesota
- NFL draft: 1940: 1st round, 9th overall pick

Career history
- Green Bay Packers (1940–1941)

Awards and highlights
- 2× Second-team All-Big Ten (1937, 1939)

Career NFL statistics
- Rushing yards: 281
- Rushing average: 4.5
- Receptions: 5
- Receiving yards: 44
- Passing yards: 394
- TD–INT: 4-8
- Passer rating: 31.4
- Stats at Pro Football Reference

Harold Van Every (February 10, 1918 – August 11, 2007) was an American professional football back in the National Football League (NFL) who played 21 games for the Green Bay Packers. In 1940, the Green Bay Packers used the ninth pick in the first round of the 1940 NFL draft to sign Van Every out of the University of Minnesota. Van Every went on to play for two seasons with the Packers and retired in 1941.

Van Every then joined the United States Army for World War II, then transferred to the Air Corps after six months, becoming a bomber pilot. He was assigned to 510th Squadron, 447th Bomb Group, Eighth Air Force, flying a Boeing B-17 Flying Fortress heavy bomber out of Rattlesden Air Base in England. On his ninth mission, his B-17 was shot down by flak on May 12, 1944. He was taken prisoner and sent to Stalag Luft III, arriving just after the famous "Great Escape". Near the end of the war, with the Russians closing in, the Germans marched their prisoners away from the camp. Finally, on April 29, 1945, the POWs were liberated by George S. Patton's Third Army.
