= Jack Haman =

American football player (1918–1972)

- Haman, c. 1939

No. 15
- Position: Center

Personal information
- Born: August 18, 1918; Naperville, Illinois, U.S.
- Died: August 30, 1972 (aged 54); Nevada, Missouri, U.S.
- Listed height: 6 ft 2 in (1.88 m)
- Listed weight: 215 lb (98 kg)

Career information
- High school: Naperville Central
- College: Northwestern
- NFL draft: 1940: 3rd round, 20th overall pick

Career history
- Cleveland Rams (1940–1941)

Awards and highlights
- First-team All-American (1939); First-team All-Big Ten (1939); Second-team All-Big Ten (1938)

Career NFL statistics
- Games played: 21
- Games started: 12
- Interceptions: 6
- Stats at Pro Football Reference

John Adam Haman (August 18, 1918 – August 30, 1972), also known as Johnny Haman, was an American professional football player.

Haman was born in Naperville, Illinois, in 1918 and attended that city's Central High School.

He played college football for the Northwestern Wildcats football team from 1937 to 1939. He was selected by the International News Service, Newsweek, the Sporting News, the United Press, and others, as a first-team center on the 1939 All-America college football team. He was rated as "one of the greatest centers of the decade." He also earned a reputation as an "iron man" who played on both offense and defense, appearing in 345 of 360 minutes for Northwestern in 1939.

He was drafted by the Cleveland Rams with the 20th pick in the 1940 NFL draft and played for the Rams during the 1940 and 1941 NFL seasons. He appeared in 21 NFL games, 12 of them as a starter, intercepted six passes and scored one touchdown.

After his football career ended, Haman operated a machinery supply business in Kansas City, Missouri. Haman was killed in an automobile accident in 1972 in Nevada, Missouri.
