= Frank Bykowski =

American football player (1915–1985)

No. 4, 23
- Position: Guard

Personal information
- Born: March 24, 1915; South Bend, Indiana, U.S.
- Died: April 1, 1985 (aged 70); Bradenton, Florida, U.S.
- Listed height: 6 ft 0 in (1.83 m)
- Listed weight: 205 lb (93 kg)

Career information
- High school: South Bend Central
- College: Purdue (1936–1939)
- NFL draft: 1940: 6th round, 42nd overall pick

Career history
- Pittsburgh Steelers (1940); Milwaukee Chiefs (1940–1941)

Awards and highlights
- First-team All-Big Ten (1939)

Career NFL statistics
- Games played: 1
- Stats at Pro Football Reference

Frank Peter Bykowski (March 24, 1915 – April 1, 1985) was an American professional football guard who played one season with the Pittsburgh Steelers of the National Football League (NFL). He was drafted by the Steelers in the sixth round of the 1940 NFL draft after playing college football at Purdue University. He was also a member of the Milwaukee Chiefs of the third American Football League.

== Early life and college ==
Bykowski attended South Bend Central High School in South Bend, Indiana.

Bykowski played college football at Purdue University where he was a member of Sigma Pi fraternity. He was named to the 1939 College Football All Polish-American Team. He was selected as a member of the 1940 College All Star Team. Bykowski was inducted into the Indiana Football Hall of Fame in 1976.

== Professional career ==
Bykowski was drafted by the Pittsburgh Steelers in the sixth round of the 1940 NFL draft. He was also a member of the Milwaukee Chiefs of the third American Football League.

== Military and coaching career ==
During World War II, Bykowski served as a chief petty officer, training United States Navy recruits as a physical training instructor. He was later commissioned as an officer and advanced to Lieutenant (junior grade), serving as an armed guard commander.

Bykowski was also a coach after his playing career. He was head football coach for Elwood Jr/Sr High School from 1947 to 1959 after being an assistant coach for two years. He then coached for Frankfort High School from 1959 to 1965 and Marion High School from 1966 to 1968. He finished his career with Tippecanoe School Corporation where he coached 1969 to 1975. As a teacher, he taught physical education, driver's education, and history. He was also a guidance counselor.
