= Esco Sarkkinen =

American football player and coach (1918–1998)

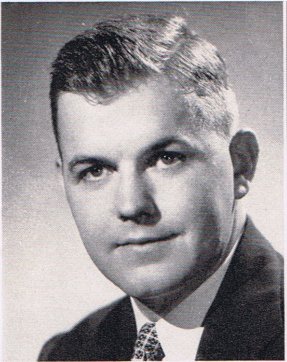
- Sarkkinen, c. 1958

Biographical details
- Born: April 9, 1918; Conneaut, Ohio, U.S.
- Died: February 28, 1998 (aged 79); Columbus, Ohio, U.S.

Playing career

Football
- 1937–1939: Ohio State
- 1942: Manhattan Beach Coast Guard
- Position: End

Coaching career (HC unless noted)
- 1946–1978: Ohio State (assistant)

Accomplishments and honors

Awards
- First-team All-Big Ten (1939)

Esco "Sark" Sarkkinen (April 9, 1918 – February 28, 1998) was an American college football player and coach. He played at Ohio State University from 1937 to 1939 and was a consensus first-team end on the 1939 College Football All-America Team. He also served as an assistant coach for the Ohio State Buckeyes football team from 1946 to 1978.

== Parents ==
Sarkkinen's parents, Eino Sr. and Rauha "Rose" Sarkkinen, were Finnish emigrants; his father was from Oulu and had emigrated to New York City in 1914, and his mother had emigrated to the United States in 1904.
