= 1939 All-Big Ten Conference football team =

American college football all-star team

The 1939 All-Big Ten Conference football team consists of American football players selected to the All-Big Ten Conference teams selected by the Associated Press (AP) and United Press (UP) for the 1939 Big Ten Conference football season.

== All Big-Ten selections ==
=== Ends ===
- Esco Sarkkinen, Ohio State (AP-1; UP-1)
- Dave Rankin, Purdue (AP-2; UP-1)
- Erwin Prasse, Iowa (AP-1)
- John Mariucci, Minnesota (AP-2)

=== Tackles ===
- Jim Reeder, Illinois (AP-1; UP-1)
- Mike Enich, Iowa (AP-2; UP-1)
- Win Pedersen, Minnesota (AP-1)
- Nick Cutlich, Northwestern (AP-2)

=== Guards ===
- Hal Method, Northwestern (AP-1; UP-1)
- Frank Bykowski, Purdue (UP-1)
- Vic Marino, Ohio State (AP-1)
- Mel Brewer, Illinois (AP-2)
- James Logan, Indiana (AP-2)

=== Centers ===
- Jack Haman, Northwestern (AP-1; UP-1)
- Steve Andrako, Ohio State (AP-2)

=== Quarterbacks ===
- Don Scott, Ohio State (AP-1; UP-1)
- Forest Evashevski, Michigan (AP-2)

=== Halfbacks ===
- Tom Harmon, Michigan (AP-1; UP-1) (1940 Heisman Trophy winner)
- Nile Kinnick, Iowa (AP-1; UP-1) (1939 Heisman Trophy winner)
- Hal Van Every, Minnesota (AP-2)
- George Franck, Minnesota (AP-2)
- Jimmy Strausbaugh, Ohio State (AP-2)

=== Fullbacks ===
- George Paskvan, Wisconsin (AP-1; UP-1)
- Jim Langhurst, Ohio State (AP-2)

== Key ==
AP = Associated Press, chosen by conference coaches

UP = United Press: "Coaches, scouts, players, campus correspondents and sports editors in every Big Ten center, participating in one of the most thorough investigations of football talent ever attempted in the midwest"

Bold = Consensus first-team selection of both the AP and UP

== See also ==
- 1939 College Football All-America Team
