= Don Scott (American football) =

American football player (died 1943)

Personal details
- Born: Donald E. Scott
- Died: October 1, 1943 England
- Cause of death: Plane crash
- Education: Ohio State University

Military service
- Branch/service: United States Army Air Forces
- Years of service: 1941–1943
- Battles/wars: World War II

Donald E. Scott (died October 1, 1943) was a star of American football. He was a two-time All-American quarterback at Ohio State University. As a pilot Scott had already completed nine bombing missions during World War II, on October 1, 1943, while going through a special training exercise in England, Scott's bomber crashed, taking his life at just age 23.

== High school star ==
In football, Scott was a two-time all-state selection at Canton McKinley High School. As a sophomore Scott was a tackle on the offensive and defensive lines. He also punted and kicked extra points. As a junior and senior he was named the left halfback in a single-wing formation offense, making him the team's primary ball handler. He completed 58 percent of his passes (48 of 93) for 991 yards and 11 touchdowns. He also rushed for 657 yards on 74 carries. He kicked 34 extra points.

In basketball, Scott twice helped lead the school team to the state semifinals.

=== Honors ===
- Following his death, Canton City School's track field was renamed Don Scott Field.
- Scott was a second-year inductee to the Stark County High School Football Hall of Fame.

== College career ==
Scott was a two-time All-American selection for the Ohio State University Buckeyes football team. He was called the most versatile back in college football because he was a brilliant passer, blocker, and ball carrier. His head coach, Francis Schmidt, later said, "I can’t remember a back as dangerous in so many departments of play.”

Scott lettered for the Ohio State Buckeyes football team in 1938, 1939, and 1940. In 1938 he was a starting halfback. He became the Buckeyes' starting quarterback as a junior in 1939 and led the team to the Big Ten Conference title. That year, he received his first All-American selection. He returned as quarterback in his senior year and was again named as All American.

Scott also played basketball for one season. The 1938-39 Ohio State team appeared in the first NCAA basketball tournament, and advanced to the first NCAA championship game. Oregon beat the Buckeyes 46-33.

=== Honors ===
- Scott was a 1988 inductee to the Ohio State Varsity O Hall of Fame.
- In 2000 Scott was one of five quarterbacks named to the Ohio State Football All-Century Team.

== War and death ==
Scott was the ninth overall selection in the first round of the 1941 NFL draft. He was selected by the Chicago Bears. Scott decided to volunteer to fight in the war in Europe. Scott had participated in the Civilian Pilot Training Program, sponsored by the Civil Aeronautics Administration, while at Ohio State. When he entered the United States Army Air Forces it was as a commissioned pilot.

On October 1, 1943, Capt. Don Scott died when his Martin B-26 Marauder bomber crashed in England while he was in training. He was buried in Canton, Ohio. The following month, Ohio State University trustees named the school's new airport after him.

=== Honors ===
- The airport, like the Canton football field, is named Don Scott Field.
- The Ohio State University Airport is also known as the OSU Don Scott Airport.
