= 1940 Detroit Lions season =

NFL team season

- Owner: Fred L. Mandel Jr.
- Head coach: Potsy Clark
- Home stadium: University of Detroit Stadium

Results
- Record: 5–5–1
- Division place: 3rd NFL Western
- Playoffs: Did not qualify

The 1940 Detroit Lions season was their 11th in the league. The team failed to improve on their previous season's output of 6–5, winning only five games. They failed to qualify for the playoffs for the fifth consecutive season.

Due to a dispute between new Lions owner Fred Mandel and Detroit Tigers owner Walter Briggs, the Lions played the entire 1940 home schedule at University of Detroit Stadium.

== Offseason ==
=== NFL Draft ===
1940 Detroit Lions draft
Round	Pick	Player	Position	College	Notes
1	6	Doyle Nave	B	USC	
3	21	Bill Fisk	E	USC	
5	36	Harry Smith	T	USC	
6	46	Harry Rike	C	Tennessee	
7	56	Bob Winslow	DE	USC	
8	66	Bill Tranavitch	B	Rutgers	
9	76	Bob Haas	T	Missouri	
10	86	Leon DeWitte	B	Purdue	
11	96	Erwin Prasse	E	Iowa	
12	106	Ken Binder	B	Carnegie Mellon	
13	116	Justin Bowers	T	Oklahoma	
14	126	Jack Morlock	WB	Marshall	
15	136	Stillman Rouse	E	Missouri	
16	146	Jack Padley	E	Dayton	
17	156	Johnny Hackenbruck	T	Oregon State	
18	166	Frank Ribar	G	Duke	
19	176	Herb McCarthy	B	Denver	
20	186	Dub Parten	C	Centenary	
21	191	Malvern Morgan	C	Auburn	
22	196	Bob Orf	E	Missouri	
Made roster † Pro Football Hall of Fame

== Roster ==
1940 Detroit Lions final roster
Backs: 34 Bill Callihan RB/CB/T; 3 Lloyd Cardwell RB/CB; 21 Jack Morlock WB; 23 Paul Moore RB/CB/LB; 6 Kent Ryan RB/CB/P; 9 Bill Shepherd FB/LB; 36 Dwight Sloan FB/CB; 22 Fred Vanzo RB/CB; 5 Howie Weiss FB/LB; 24 Whizzer White RB/S/K/P	Linemen/Linebackers: 37 Cotton Price TB/QB/DB; 42 Tony Calvelli C/LB; 13 Clem Crabtree G/DG/T/DT; 26 Bill Feldhaus G/DG; 38 Tony Furst T/DT; 25 Johnny Hackenbruck T/DT; 16 Jack Johnson T/DT; 28 Bill Radovich G/DG; 8 Sam Tsoutsouvas C/LB; 33 Harry Smith T/DT; 43 Harry Speelman G; 15 Cal Thomas T/DT; 48 Socko Wiethe G/DG; 40 Bob Winslow DE; 30 Alex Wojciechowicz C/LB	Ends/Receivers: 32 Dave Diehl C; 10 Bill Fisk E/DE; 57 Glenn Morris E; 12 Chuck Hanneman K; 35 Stillman Rouse LE; Reserve: Paul Szakash RB/S (inactive); rookies in italics

== Regular season ==
=== Schedule ===
Game	Date	Opponent	Result	Record	Venue	Attendance	Recap	Sources
1	September 15	at **Chicago Cardinals**	**T** 0–0	0–0–1	War Memorial Stadium	18,048	Recap	
2	September 22	Pittsburgh Steelers	**L** 7–10	0–1–1	Dinan Field	15,310	Recap	
3	September 29	**Cleveland Rams**	**W** 6–0	1–0–1	Dinan Field	15,347	Recap	
4	October 5	**Chicago Cardinals**	**W** 43–14	2–0–1	Dinan Field	20,619	Recap	
5	October 13	at **Chicago Bears**	**L** 0–7	2–1–1	Soldier Field	34,217	Recap	
6	October 20	at **Green Bay Packers**	**W** 23–14	3–1–1	City Stadium	21,001	Recap	
7	October 27	Washington Redskins	**L** 14–20	3–3–1	Dinan Field	28,809	Recap	
8	November 3	at **Cleveland Rams**	**L** 0–24	3–4–1	Cleveland Stadium	18,881	Recap	
9	November 10	**Chicago Bears**	**W** 17–14	4–4–1	Dinan Field	21,735	Recap	
10	November 17	at Philadelphia Eagles	**W** 21–0	5–4–1	Shibe Park	6,327	Recap	
11	November 24	**Green Bay Packers**	**L** 7–50	5–5–1	Briggs Stadium	26,019	Recap	
Note: Intra-division opponents are in **bold** text.

== Standings ==
NFL Western Division
	W	L	T	PCT	DIV	PF	PA	STK
Chicago Bears	8	3	0	.727	6–2	238	152	W2
Green Bay Packers	6	4	1	.600	4–3–1	238	155	T1
Detroit Lions	5	5	1	.500	4–3–1	138	153	L1
Cleveland Rams	4	6	1	.400	2–5–1	171	191	T1
Chicago Cardinals	2	7	2	.222	2–5–1	139	222	L3

Note: Tie games were not officially counted in the standings until 1972.
