= 1940 Green Bay Packers season =

NFL team season

- Head coach: Curly Lambeau
- Home stadium: City Stadium; Wisconsin State Fair Park

Results
- Record: 6–4–1
- Division place: 2nd NFL Western
- Playoffs: Did not qualify

The 1940 Green Bay Packers season marked the franchise's 22nd season overall and their 20th year in the National Football League (NFL). In a scheduling idiosyncrasy, the Packers began 1940 playing six consecutive home games before finishing on the road for the last five contests of the season. The defending NFL champions, Green Bay finished with a 6–4–1 record under founder and head coach Curly Lambeau, earning them a second-place finish in the Western Conference.

== Offseason ==
=== NFL draft ===
Round	Pick	Player	Position	School/club team
1	9	Hal Van Every	Halfback	Minnesota
3	24	Lou Brock	Back	Purdue
5	39	Esco Sarkkinen	End	Ohio State
6	49	Dick Cassiano	Back	Pittsburgh
7	59	Millard White	Tackle	Tulane
8	69	George Seeman	End	Nebraska
9	79	J. R. Manley	Guard	Oklahoma
10	89	Jack Brown	Back	Purdue
11	99	Don Guritz	Guard	Northwestern
12	109	Phil Gaspar	Tackle	USC
13	119	Ambrose Schindler	Quarterback	USC
14	129	Bill Kerr	End	Notre Dame
15	139	Mel Brewer	Guard	Illinois
16	149	Ray Andrus	Back	Vanderbilt
17	159	Archie Kodros	Center	Michigan
18	169	Jim Gillette	Halfback	Virginia
19	179	Al Matuza	Center	Georgetown
20	189	Jim Reeder	Tackle	Illinois
21	194	Vince Eichler	Back	Cornell
22	199	Henry Luebcke	Tackle	Iowa

== Regular season ==
=== Schedule ===
Game	Date	Opponent	Result	Record	Venue	Attendance	Recap	Sources
1	September 15	Philadelphia Eagles	**W** 27–20	1–0	City Stadium	11,657	Recap	
2	September 22	**Chicago Bears**	**L** 10–41	1–1	City Stadium	22,557	Recap	
3	September 29	**Chicago Cardinals**	**W** 31–6	2–1	Wisconsin State Fair Park	20,234	Recap	
—	Bye							
4	October 13	**Cleveland Rams**	**W** 31–14	3–1	City Stadium	16,299	Recap	
5	October 20	**Detroit Lions**	**L** 14–23	3–2	City Stadium	21,001	Recap	
6	October 27	Pittsburgh Steelers	**W** 24–3	4–2	Wisconsin State Fair Park	13,703	Recap	
7	November 3	at **Chicago Bears**	**L** 7–14	4–3	Wrigley Field	45,434	Recap	
8	November 10	at **Chicago Cardinals**	**W** 28–7	5–3	Comiskey Park	11,364	Recap	
9	November 17	at New York Giants	**L** 3–7	5–4	Polo Grounds	28,262	Recap	
10	November 24	at **Detroit Lions**	**W** 50–7	6–4	University of Detroit Stadium	26,019	Recap	
11	December 1	at **Cleveland Rams**	**T** 13–13	6–4–1	Cleveland Municipal Stadium	16,249	Recap	
Note: Intra-division opponents are in **bold** text.

== Standings ==
NFL Western Division
	W	L	T	PCT	DIV	PF	PA	STK
Chicago Bears	8	3	0	.727	6–2	238	152	W2
Green Bay Packers	6	4	1	.600	4–3–1	238	155	T1
Detroit Lions	5	5	1	.500	4–3–1	138	153	L1
Cleveland Rams	4	6	1	.400	2–5–1	171	191	T1
Chicago Cardinals	2	7	2	.222	2–5–1	139	222	L3

Note: Tie games were not officially counted in the standings until 1972.

== Roster ==
1940 Green Bay Packers final roster
Backs: 55 Bob Adkins RB/CB/S; 35 Frank Balazs FB/LB; 15 Lou Brock RB/CB/S; 52 Larry Buhler FB/LB; 54 Larry Craig RB/S; 38 Arnie Herber RB/CB/P; 30 Clarke Hinkle FB/LB/K/P; 17 Cecil Isbell RB/CB; 7 Eddie Jankowski FB/LB; 24 Joe Laws RB/CB; 42 Andy Uram RB/CB; 36 Hal Van Every RB/CB/P; 33 Dick Weisgerber RB/S	Linemen/Linebackers: 29 Charley Brock C/LB; 18 Leo Disend T/DT; 34 Tiny Engebretsen G/DG/K; 43 Buckets Goldenberg G/DG; 56 Tom Greenfield C/LB; 64 Howard Johnson G/DG; 41 Paul Kell T/DT; 40 Bill Lee T/DT; 46 Russ Letlow G/DG; 27 Lou Midler T/DT; 44 Baby Ray T/DT; 57 Champ Seibold T/DT; 66 George Svendsen C/LB; 21 Pete Tinsley G/DG; 63 Gust Zarnas G/DG	Ends/Receivers: 53 Dick Evans; 14 Don Hutson K; 48 Harry Jacunski; 19 Carl Mulleneaux; 5 Ray Riddick; Reserve: 60 Charlie Schultz T/DT (IR); Rookies in italics
