= 1940 Cleveland Rams season =

NFL team season

- Head coach: Earl "Dutch" Clark
- Home stadium: Cleveland Stadium

Results
- Record: 4–6–1
- Division place: 4th NFL Western
- Playoffs: Did not qualify

The 1940 Cleveland Rams season marked the team's fifth season in franchise history and its fourth year in the National Football League (NFL).

== Schedule ==
Game	Date	Opponent	Result	Record	Venue	Attendance	Recap	Sources
1	September 22	Philadelphia Eagles	**W** 21–13	1–0	Cleveland Stadium	15,941	Recap	
2	September 29	at **Detroit Lions**	**L** 0–6	1–1	University of Detroit Stadium	15,347	Recap	
3	October 6	**Chicago Bears**	**L** 14–21	1–2	Cleveland Stadium	18,998	Recap	
4	October 13	at **Green Bay Packers**	**L** 14–31	1–3	City Stadium	16,299	Recap	
5	October 20	**Chicago Cardinals**	**W** 26–14	2–3	Cleveland Stadium	13,683	Recap	
6	October 27	at **Chicago Cardinals**	**L** 7–17	2–4	Comiskey Park	10,313	Recap	
7	November 3	**Detroit Lions**	**W** 24–0	3–4	Cleveland Stadium	18,881	Recap	
8	November 10	at New York Giants	**W** 13–0	4–4	Polo Grounds	23,614	Recap	
9	November 17	at Brooklyn Dodgers	**L** 14–29	4–5	Ebbets Field	19,212	Recap	
10	November 24	at **Chicago Bears**	**L** 25–47	4–6	Wrigley Field	20,717	Recap	
11	December 1	**Green Bay Packers**	**T** 13–13	4–6–1	Cleveland Stadium	16,249	Recap	
Note: Intra-division opponents are in **bold** text.

== Roster ==
1940 Cleveland Rams final roster
Backs: 1 Olie Cordill RB/CB/P; 14 Johnny Drake FB/LB/K; 9 Jim Gillette RB/CB; 32 Parker Hall RB/CB/P; 38 Len Janiak FB/LB; 8 Dante Magnani RB/CB; 5 Marty Slovak RB/CB; 10 Gaylon Smith RB/CB/S; 33 Vic Spadaccini RB/S/K	Linemen/Linebackers: 39 Stan Andersen T/DT; 21 Boyd Clay T/DT; 20 Moose Dunstan T/DT; 24 Shag Goolsby C/LB; 15 Jack Haman C/LB; 31 Ted Livingston G/DG; 11 Riley Matheson G/DG; 30 Barney McGarry G/DG; 17 Hank Rockwell G/DG; 36 Fred Shirey T/DT; 4 Ralph Stevenson G/DG	Ends/Receivers: 34 Chet Adams T/DT/K; 26 Jim Benton; 6 Connie Mack Berry; 19 Paul McDonough; 2 Maury Patt; 12 Johnny Wilson; Reserve: 37 Red Conkright C/LB; 25 Glenn Olson RB/S; 23 Mike Rodak E; rookies in italics

== Standings ==
Program for the October 6 visit of the Chicago Bears to Cleveland.

NFL Western Division
	W	L	T	PCT	DIV	PF	PA	STK
Chicago Bears	8	3	0	.727	6–2	238	152	W2
Green Bay Packers	6	4	1	.600	4–3–1	238	155	T1
Detroit Lions	5	5	1	.500	4–3–1	138	153	L1
Cleveland Rams	4	6	1	.400	2–5–1	171	191	T1
Chicago Cardinals	2	7	2	.222	2–5–1	139	222	L3

Note: Tie games were not officially counted in the standings until 1972.
