= List of Northwestern Wildcats in the NFL draft =

This is a list of Northwestern Wildcats football players in the NFL Draft.

== Key ==
B	Back	K	Kicker	NT	Nose tackle
C	Center	LB	Linebacker	FB	Fullback
DB	Defensive back	P	Punter	HB	Halfback
DE	Defensive end	QB	Quarterback	WR	Wide receiver
DT	Defensive tackle	RB	Running back	G	Guard
E	End	T	Offensive tackle	TE	Tight end

== Selections ==
Year	Round	Pick	Overall	Player	Team	Position
1936	4	2	29	Paul Tangora	Boston Redskins	G
1936	8	7	70	Wally Cruice	Green Bay Packers	B
1937	5	9	49	Dewitt Gibson	Green Bay Packers	T
1937	8	3	73	Steve Reid	Brooklyn Dodgers	G
1937	8	8	78	Steve Toth	Chicago Bears	B
1938	3	8	23	Fred Vanzo	New York Giants	B
1938	7	7	57	Johnny Kovatch	Green Bay Packers	E
1939	15	6	136	Bob Voigts	Chicago Bears	T
1940	3	5	20	Johnny Haman	Cleveland Rams	C
1940	11	4	94	Nick Cutlich	Brooklyn Dodgers	T
1940	11	9	99	Don Guritz	Green Bay Packers	G
1941	11	7	97	Paul Heimenz	Green Bay Packers	C
1941	14	3	123	Joe Lokanc	Chicago Cardinals	G
1941	18	8	168	Ollie Hahnenstein	Chicago Bears	B
1942	2	5	15	Alf Bauman	Detroit Lions	T
1942	14	6	126	Bill DeCorrevont	Washington Redskins	B
1942	17	2	152	Don Clawson	Cleveland Rams	B
1942	19	9	179	George Benson	Green Bay Packers	B
1943	9	10	80	Bob Motl	Washington Redskins	E
1943	16	4	144	Nick Burke	Chicago Cardinals	G
1943	28	8	268	Bud Hasse	Green Bay Packers	E
1944	1	4	4	Otto Graham	Detroit Lions	QB
1944	16	8	161	Ed Hirsch	Chicago Bears	B
1944	21	3	211	Alex Kapter	Detroit Lions	G
1944	21	7	215	Bill Ivy	Washington Redskins	T
1944	23	1	231	Don Buffmire	Chicago Cardinals	B
1944	26	8	271	Harry Franck	Chicago Bears	B
1944	29	1	297	Vince DiFrancesca	Chicago Cardinals	T
1945	8	10	75	Nick Vodick	New York Giants	B
1945	11	6	104	Mack Creger	Washington Redskins	B
1945	31	3	321	Ben Schadler	Detroit Lions	B
1946	8	8	68	Jim Lecture	Philadelphia Eagles	G
1946	17	5	155	Ray Justak	New York Giants	G
1946	24	1	221	Jack McKenzie	Chicago Cardinals	B
1946	24	7	227	Bob Funderberg	Detroit Lions	B
1946	30	4	284	Harry Franck	Chicago Bears	B
1947	1	10	10	Vic Schwall	New York Giants	B
1947	6	3	38	Frank Aschenbrenner	Pittsburgh Steelers	B
1947	7	7	52	Dick Connors	Green Bay Packers	B
1947	8	5	60	George Maddock	Chicago Cardinals	T
1947	11	6	91	Alex Sarkisian	Philadelphia Eagles	C
1947	26	10	245	Max Morris	Chicago Bears	B
1947	30	5	280	Jerry Carle	Green Bay Packers	B
1947	31	2	287	Vince DiFrancesca	Pittsburgh Steelers	G
1948	9	6	71	Ken Wiltgen	New York Giants	E
1949	12	4	115	George Sundheim	New York Giants	B
1950	3	4	31	Art Murakowski	Detroit Lions	B
1950	6	6	72	Gaspar Perricone	Chicago Bears	B
1950	12	6	150	Ray Wietecha	New York Giants	C
1950	15	4	187	Tom Worthington	Detroit Lions	B
1950	18	13	235	Ed Tunnicliff	Philadelphia Eagles	B
1950	19	8	243	Loran Day	Chicago Cardinals	B
1950	23	5	292	Joe Zuravleff	Washington Redskins	E
1950	28	13	365	Don Burson	Philadelphia Eagles	B
1951	3	4	30	Don Stonesifer	Chicago Cardinals	E
1951	14	12	171	Rudy Cernoch	Cleveland Browns	T
1951	16	4	187	Gene Miller	Chicago Cardinals	B
1951	25	10	301	Johnny Miller	Chicago Bears	B
1952	9	6	103	Dick Alban	Washington Redskins	B
1952	13	7	152	Rich Athan	Chicago Bears	B
1953	15	5	174	Ralph Jecha	Chicago Bears	G
1953	20	8	237	Ray Huizinga	San Francisco 49ers	T
1953	30	1	350	Tom Roche	Baltimore Colts	T
1953	30	8	357	Chuck Hren	Philadelphia Eagles	B
1954	22	4	257	Joe Collier	New York Giants	E
1954	30	7	356	Don Rondou	Washington Redskins	B
1955	13	7	152	John Damore	New York Giants	C
1956	28	1	326	John Smith	Detroit Lions	G
1956	29	4	341	Jim Troglin	Chicago Cardinals	B
1957	23	8	273	Al Viola	Washington Redskins	G
1957	30	5	354	Bob McKiever	Cleveland Browns	B
1958	27	4	317	Ben Napolski	Chicago Bears	E
1958	28	3	328	Gene Gossage	Philadelphia Eagles	T
1959	5	7	55	Andy Cvercko	Green Bay Packers	C
1959	8	2	86	Wilmer Fowler	Philadelphia Eagles	B
1960	1	9	9	Ron Burton	Philadelphia Eagles	B
1960	4	3	39	Jim Andreotti	Detroit Lions	C
1960	9	2	98	Dewitt Hoopes	St. Louis Cardinals	T
1961	2	4	18	Elbert Kimbrough	Los Angeles Rams	E
1961	6	5	75	Larry Wood	Los Angeles Rams	B
1961	6	13	83	Dick Thornton	St. Louis Cardinals	QB
1961	7	9	93	Ray Purdin	San Francisco 49ers	B
1961	7	14	98	Irv Cross	Philadelphia Eagles	B
1961	12	8	162	Mike Stock	St. Louis Cardinals	B
1961	20	7	273	Elbert Kimbrough	Baltimore Colts	B
1962	1	6	6	Fate Echols	St. Louis Cardinals	T
1962	8	12	110	Larry Onesti	Chicago Bears	C
1962	20	11	277	Paul Flatley	Cleveland Browns	B
1963	4	2	44	Paul Flatley	Minnesota Vikings	E
1963	5	7	63	Jack Cverko	Green Bay Packers	G
1963	7	13	97	Burt Petkus	New York Giants	G
1964	7	14	98	Chuck Logan	Chicago Bears	E
1964	14	13	195	Tom O'Grady	Green Bay Packers	E
1964	15	14	210	George Burman	Chicago Bears	T
1965	2	2	16	Joe Cerne	San Francisco 49ers	C
1965	4	4	46	Tom Myers	Detroit Lions	QB
1965	13	12	180	Steve Murphy	St. Louis Cardinals	RB
1965	18	3	241	Mike Schwager	Chicago Bears	T
1966	9	13	138	Ron Rector	Green Bay Packers	RB
1966	14	12	212	Mike Buckner	Chicago Bears	DB
1967	1	11	11	Cas Banaszek	San Francisco 49ers	TE
1967	3	23	76	Phil Clark	Dallas Cowboys	DB
1967	6	11	144	John McCambridge	Detroit Lions	DE
1967	7	26	185	Bob McKelvey	New Orleans Saints	RB
1967	8	10	195	Roger Murphy	Chicago Bears	WR
1967	10	5	242	Woodrow Campbell	Houston Oilers	RB
1967	17	7	426	Ken Ramsey	Detroit Lions	DT
1968	11	11	284	Tom Garretson	Washington Redskins	DB
1969	4	23	101	Jack Rudnay	Kansas City Chiefs	C
1969	17	7	423	Chico Kurzawski	New Orleans Saints	DB
1971	5	16	120	Mike Adamle	Kansas City Chiefs	RB
1971	8	16	198	Rick Telander	Kansas City Chiefs	DB
1971	11	14	274	Mike Sikich	Cleveland Browns	G
1971	12	1	287	John Rodman	New England Patriots	T
1972	7	6	162	Eric Hutchinson	Houston Oilers	DB
1972	9	19	227	Jerry Brown	San Francisco 49ers	DB
1973	3	13	65	Jim Lash	Minnesota Vikings	WR
1973	14	20	358	James Anderson	Green Bay Packers	DT
1974	3	12	64	Steve Craig	Minnesota Vikings	TE
1974	5	19	123	Pete Wessel	Oakland Raiders	DB
1974	7	24	180	Mike Varty	Washington Redskins	LB
1975	17	3	419	Mitch Anderson	Atlanta Falcons	QB
1976	12	23	342	Darryl Brandford	Miami Dolphins	DT
1977	5	5	117	Randy Dean	New York Giants	QB
1977	6	13	152	Pete Shaw	San Diego Chargers	DB
1977	7	7	174	Greg Boykin	New Orleans Saints	RB
1978	6	15	153	Tony Ardizzone	Detroit Lions	G
1980	12	25	330	Norm Wells	Dallas Cowboys	DE
1982	12	22	328	Rob Taylor	Philadelphia Eagles	T
1983	1	4	4	Chris Hinton	Denver Broncos	T
1984	2	5	33	Mike Guendling	San Diego Chargers	LB
1984	5	16	128	John Kidd	Buffalo Bills	P
1985	3	27	83	Alex Moyer	Miami Dolphins	LB
1985	9	2	226	Steve Tasker	Houston Oilers	WR
1985	9	14	238	Keith Crusie	Cincinnati Bengals	DE
1985	11	21	301	Kevin Brown	Los Angeles Rams	DB
1986	11	17	294	Tom Flaherty	Cincinnati Bengals	LB
1987	10	7	258	Curtis Duncan	Houston Oilers	WR
1989	7	1	168	Kevin Peterson	Dallas Cowboys	LB
1989	9	25	248	Byron Sanders	Chicago Bears	RB
1989	11	16	295	Mike Baum	Seattle Seahawks	DE
1991	12	4	310	Bob Christian	Atlanta Falcons	RB
1992	7	3	171	Darryl Ashmore	Los Angeles Rams	T
1994	3	21	86	Steve Shine	Cincinnati Bengals	LB
1994	6	26	187	Lee Gissendaner	Houston Oilers	WR
1995	2	1	33	Matt O'Dwyer	New York Jets	G
1995	5	1	135	Michael Senters	Carolina Panthers	WR
1997	4	9	105	Darnell Autry	Chicago Bears	RB
1997	6	1	164	Tim Scharf	New York Jets	LB
1997	7	2	203	Hudhaifa Ismaeli	Miami Dolphins	DB
1998	5	11	134	Casey Dailey	New York Jets	LB
1998	6	18	171	Nathan Strikwerda	Miami Dolphins	C
1999	2	4	35	Barry Gardner	Philadelphia Eagles	LB
1999	3	10	71	D'Wayne Bates	Chicago Bears	WR
1999	4	17	112	Sean Bennett	New York Giants	RB
2000	5	35	164	Jay Tant	Arizona Cardinals	TE
2001	7	10	210	Harold Blackmon	Seattle Seahawks	DB
2001	7	31	231	Dwayne Missouri	Baltimore Ravens	DE
2002	1	23	23	Napoleon Harris	Oakland Raiders	LB
2002	4	3	101	Kevin Bentley	Cleveland Browns	LB
2002	5	35	170	Sam Simmons	Miami Dolphins	WR
2003	4	36	133	Austin King	Tampa Bay Buccaneers	C
2005	1	28	28	Luis Castillo	San Diego Chargers	DT
2005	3	29	93	Trai Essex	Pittsburgh Steelers	T
2005	7	30	244	Noah Herron	Pittsburgh Steelers	RB
2006	4	27	124	Barry Cofield	New York Giants	DT
2006	7	2	210	Zach Strief	New Orleans Saints	G
2006	7	13	221	Tim McGarigle	St. Louis Rams	LB
2010	4	11	109	Corey Wootton	Chicago Bears	DE
2010	4	24	122	Mike Kafka	Philadelphia Eagles	QB
2010	5	13	144	Sherrick McManis	Houston Texans	DB
2012	7	26	233	Drake Dunsmore	Tampa Bay Buccaneers	TE
2012	7	28	235	Jeremy Ebert	New England Patriots	WR
2015	4	16	115	Ibraheim Campbell	Cleveland Browns	DB
2015	7	33	250	Trevor Siemian	Denver Broncos	QB
2016	4	39	137	Dean Lowry	Green Bay Packers	DE
2016	6	22	197	Danny Vitale	Tampa Bay Buccaneers	FB
2017	5	17	161	Anthony Walker Jr.	Indianapolis Colts	LB
2017	7	2	220	Ifeadi Odenigbo	Minnesota Vikings	DE
2018	7	33	251	Justin Jackson	Los Angeles Chargers	RB
2019	5	29	167	Clayton Thorson	Philadelphia Eagles	QB
2021	1	13	13	Rashawn Slater	Los Angeles Chargers	T
2021	1	26	26	Greg Newsome II	Cleveland Browns	DB
2021	5	30	174	Earnest Brown IV	Los Angeles Rams	DE
2023	1	11	11	Peter Skoronski	Tennessee Titans	T
2023	4	8	110	Adetomiwa Adebawore	Indianapolis Colts	DE
2023	5	7	142	Cameron Mitchell	Cleveland Browns	DB
2023	5	41	176	Evan Hull	Indianapolis Colts	RB
2026	4	33	97	Caleb Tiernan	Minnesota Vikings	T
2026	7	37	253	Evan Beerntsen	Baltimore Ravens	G

== Notable undrafted players ==
Note: No drafts held before 1920

Debut Year	Player	Position	Debut Team	Notes
1953	Dick Flowers	QB	Green Bay Packers	—
1960	Doug Asad	TE	Oakland Raiders	—
1960	Mark Johnson	CB	Houston Oilers	—
1960	Fred Williamson	CB	Oakland Raiders	—
1963	Larry Benz	S	Cleveland Browns	—
1965	Tim Powell	DE	Los Angeles Rams	—
1965	Joe Szczecko	DT	Chicago Bears	—
1966	Dick Smith	DB	Kansas City Chiefs	-
1969	Angelo Loukas	G	Buffalo Bills	—
1972	Barry Pearson	WR	Pittsburgh Steelers	—
1977	Neil Little	DB	Chicago Bears	—
1977	Scott Yelvington	WR	Chicago Bears	—
1982	Mike Kerrigan	QB	New England Patriots	—
1987	Rich Borresen	TE	Dallas Cowboys	—
1987	Ted Karras	DT	Washington Redskins	—
1987	Mike Witteck	LB	New York Jets	—
1991	Richard Buchanan	WR	Miami Dolphins	—
1992	Eddie Sutter	LB	Minnesota Vikings	—
1995	Todd Baczek	G	New York Jets	—
1998	Paul Janus	T	Carolina Panthers	—
1998	Keith Lowzowski	FB	New York Jets	—
1998	Brian Musso	WR	New York Jets	—
2001	Javier Collins	DT	Dallas Cowboys	—
2002	Damien Anderson	RB	Arizona Cardinals	—
2002	Zak Kustok	QB	Miami Dolphins	—
2002	Mike Souza	C	Indianapolis Colts	—
2003	Jeff Roehl	T	New York Giants	—
2004	Jason Wright	RB	Atlanta Falcons	—
2005	Matt Ulrich	G	Indianapolis Colts	—
2006	Brett Basanez	QB	Carolina Panthers	—
2007	Marquice Cole	DB	Oakland Raiders	—
2007	Nick Roach	LB	Chicago Bears	—
2009	Eric Peterman	WR	Chicago Bears	—
2009	Tyrell Sutton	RB	Green Bay Packers	—
2010	Zeke Markshausen	WR	Chicago Bears	—
2011	Corbin Bryant	DE	Chicago Bears	—
2013	Brian Arnfelt	DE	Pittsburgh Steelers	—
2014	Kain Colter	WR	Minnesota Vikings	—
2014	Tyler Scott	DE	Minnesota Vikings	—
2017	Austin Carr	WR	New England Patriots	—
2018	Garrett Dickerson	TE	New York Giants	—
2018	Godwin Igwebuike	RB	Tampa Bay Buccaneers	—
2018	Tyler Lancaster	DT	Green Bay Packers	—
2019	Blake Hance	G	Buffalo Bills	—
2024	Ben Bryant	QB	New York Jets	—
2025	A. J. Henning	WR	Miami Dolphins	—
2025	Marshall Lang	TE	Seattle Seahawks	—
2026	Fred Davis II	DB	Washington Commanders	—
2026	Aidan Hubbard	LB	Seattle Seahawks	—
