= 1940 NFL All-Star Game (January) =

NFL All-Star Game

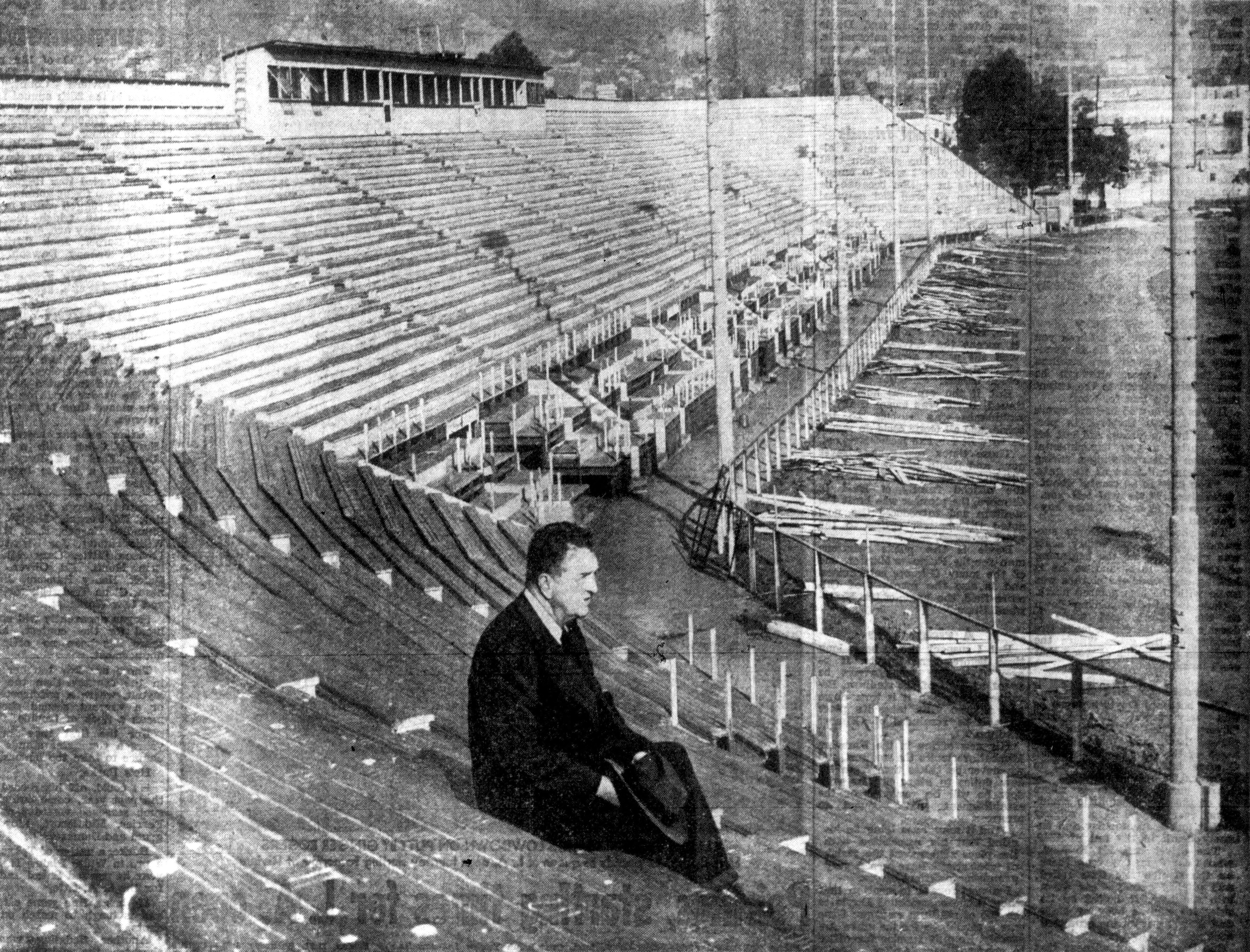
- Gilmore Stadium (c. 1951) was the site of the game
Green Bay Packers (9–2)	NFL All-Stars (Not applicable)
16	7
Head coach: Curly Lambeau (Green Bay Packers)	Head coach: Steve Owen (New York Giants)
	1	2	3	4	Total
Green Bay Packers	3	10	0	3	16
NFL All-Stars	0	0	7	0	7
- Date: January 14, 1940
- Kickoff time: 2:00 p.m. PST
- Stadium: Gilmore Stadium; Los Angeles, CA
- Attendance: 18,000

Radio in the United States
- Announcers: Russ Winnie

The 1940 National Football League (NFL) All-Star Game was an exhibition contest that the NFL organized after the 1939 season. The game was played between the Green Bay Packers, the league's champion that season, and a team of all-stars made up of players from the remaining NFL teams. The players on the all-star team were selected by a national poll of fans. The game, which was delayed a week due to rain, was played on Sunday, January 14, 1940, at Gilmore Stadium in Los Angeles, California, United States, in front of approximately 18,000 fans. The Packers defeated the All-Stars by a score of 16–7 on three field goals and a 92-yard touchdown pass from Cecil Isbell to Don Hutson. The all-star game format was continued for another three seasons before ending due to World War II. A new all-star format, branded as the Pro Bowl, began after the 1950 NFL season, with these all-star games retroactively considered the first Pro Bowls.

== Background ==
Starting after the 1938 season, the NFL instituted an exhibition match-up between the league's champion and a group of all-stars compiled from the remaining NFL teams. This first match-up, the 1939 NFL All-Star Game (called such because it was played in January 1939), pitted the New York Giants (the champions of the 1938 season) against the NFL All-Star team, which was selected based on fan voting. The next season, the Green Bay Packers finished with a record of 9–2, winning the Western Division. They played the New York Giants in the 1939 NFL Championship Game, winning 27–0 to become the league champion.

The second NFL All-Star Game was scheduled for January 7, 1940, with the NFL All-Stars again being selected by fan voting. The Packers team was coached by Curly Lambeau, while the NFL All-Stars were coached by Steve Owen, the head coach of the Giants. Both Lambeau and Owen would go on to be inducted into the Pro Football Hall of Fame as players and coaches. The Packers' team included three future Hall of Famers: Arnie Herber, Clarke Hinkle, and Don Hutson. Lambeau ultimately started a less experienced group with the goal of working out younger players in preparation for the next season. Russ Letlow and Harry Jacunski were both injured going into the game. The NFL All-Stars included five future Hall of Famers: Joe Stydahar, Bruiser Kinard, Mel Hein, Sammy Baugh and Turk Edwards. Prior to the game during a team meeting, the NFL All-Stars elected Hein and Ki Aldrich as co-captains.

The NFL All-Stars were projected to beat the Packers in what was billed as the only league-approved postseason game. Even though they were not expected to win, the Packers were betting favorites going into the game. Gilmore Stadium in Los Angeles, California, was expanded to provide room for up to 20,000 spectators for the game. However, rain on January 7 forced its postponement to the next Sunday, on January 14. Lambeau called a player meeting in a lead-up to the delayed game to re-energize the team, noting the natural letdown that comes from a rescheduled game. Unlike the Packers, who had just completed a full season together, the All-Stars only trained for three weeks together before the game. The game was played before approximately 18,000 people, with tickets priced at $1.10, $2.20, and $3.30. Russ Winnie announced the game over the radio in the Wisconsin area.

== Game summary ==
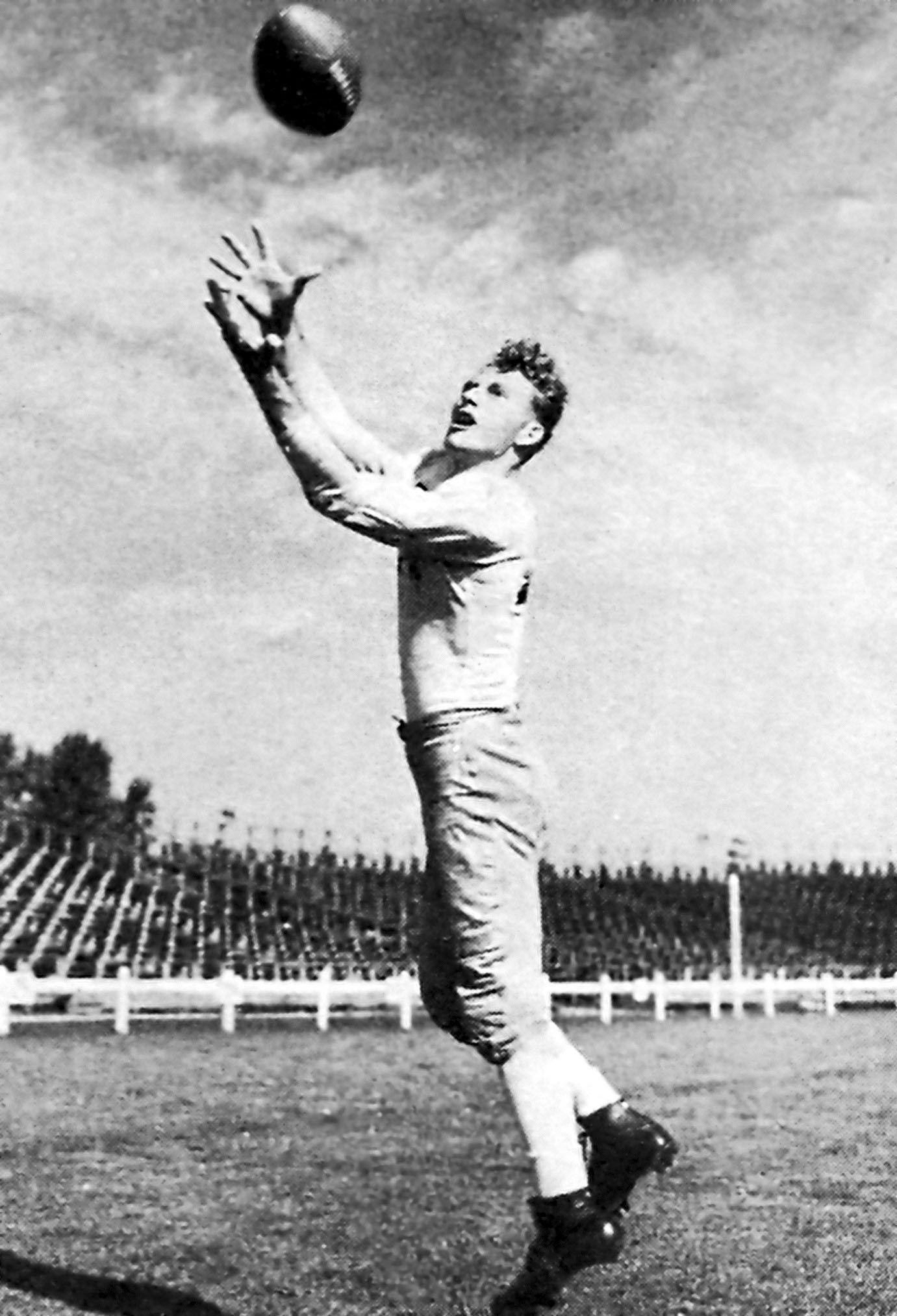
Don Hutson caught a 92-yard reception for a touchdown during the All-Star Game.

The Packers scored the first points of the game on a short drive down the field in the first quarter, highlighted by a 20-yard pass from Arnie Herber to Don Hutson. After a few short gains and a dropped pass by Larry Craig, Clarke Hinkle kicked a field goal from the 45-yard line to put the Packers up 3–0. In the second quarter, the Packers went up 6–0 on a short field goal by Ernie Smith. After the All-Stars' Parker Hall punted the ball, the Packers Joe Laws returned it to the All-Stars' 42-yard line. The Packers gained 35 yards, primarily on two completed passes, one for 15 yards by Laws and another for 16 yards by Isbell. The Packers were stopped at the 7-yard line, with Ernie Smith kicking the field goal for 3 points. Before halftime, the All-Stars threatened to score after Frank Filchock completed a 62-yard pass to Bill Smith to the 21-yard line. After getting to the 10-yard line, Filchock attempted a pass that was intercepted by Eddie Jankowski. On the second play after the turnover, Cecil Isbell threw a deep pass to Hutson; Hutson caught the ball, which was a little underthrown, and ran into the end zone for a 92-yard touchdown reception. After Ernie Smith kicked the extra point, the Packers lead grew to 13–0 just before the break. On the ensuing kick-off, Filchock fumbled the ball, which was recovered by Ernie Smith. Paul Engebretsen attempted a short field goal, but the kicked sailed wide of the goal posts. With the All-Stars taking possession of the ball before the break, Charles Goldenberg deflected a Filchock pass and then intercepted another attempt.

In the third quarter, the All-Stars broke through with their first and only score. After Herber punted the ball to mid-field, the All-Stars' Davey O'Brien returned the kick 28 yards to the 17-yard line. A first-down brought the ball to inside the 10-yard line. On third down at the 5-yard line, O'Brien completed a 5-yard touchdown pass to Joe Carter, with Ward Cuff kicking the extra point. With the Packers leading 13–7, both teams traded possessions until later in the fourth quarter. The Packers had large gains by Hinkle (24 yards) and Andy Uram (21 yards) before another Herber-to-Hutson completion brought the ball to the 8-yard line. Ernie Smith kicked another field goal, his second of the game, to bring the score to 16–7. The Packers ultimately won by this score, but not before threatening to score again after getting the ball down to the 3-yard line. Smith tried to attempt another field goal, but Herber overruled him and attempted to pass the ball into the end zone, although his pass hit the upright for an incompletion.

=== Box score ===
1940 NFL All-Star Game – Game summary

Quarter	1	2	3	4	Total
Packers	3	10	0	3	16
NFL All-Stars	0	0	7	0	7

at Gilmore Stadium, Los Angeles, CA, U.S.

- Date: Sunday, January 14, 1940
- Game time: 2:00 p.m. PST
- Game weather: High: 70 °F (21 °C) / Low: 51 °F (11 °C)
- Game attendance: 18,000
- Box score reference

Game information
First quarter
- GNB Clarke Hinkle FG (from the 45-yard line). Packers 3–0.

Second quarter

- GNB Ernie Smith FG (from the 7-yard line). Packers 6–0.
- GNB Don Hutson 92-yard pass from Cecil Isbell (Ernie Smith extra point), Packers 13–0.

Third Quarter

- NFL Joe Carter 5-yard pass from Davey O'Brien (Ward Cuff extra point). Packers 13–7.

Fourth quarter

- GNB Ernie Smith FG (from the 8-yard line). Packers 16–7.

=== Rosters ===
The rosters for both teams included the following starters and reserves:

Starters
Packers	Position	NFL All-Stars
Dick Weisgerber	QB	Fred Vanzo (Lions)
Frank Balazs	FB	Johnny Drake (Rams)
Jimmy Lawrence	LHB	Parker Hall (Rams)
Joe Laws	RHB	Erny Pinckert (Redskins)
Milt Gantenbein	LE	Buster Poole (Giants)
Allen Moore	RE	Perry Schwartz (Dodgers)
Ernie Smith	LT	Joe Stydahar (Bears)
Gust Zarnas	LG	Raymond George (Lions)
Tom Greenfield	C	Byron Gentry (Pirates)
Pete Tinsley	RG	Bruiser Kinard (Dodgers)
Charlie Schultz	RT	Mel Hein (Giants)

Reserves
Packers	NFL All-Stars
Charley Brock; Hank Bruder; Larry Buhler; Larry Craig; Paul Engebretsen; Charles Goldenberg; Arnie Herber; Clarke Hinkle; Don Hutson; Cecil Isbell; Eddie Jankowski; Harry Jacunski; Paul Kell; Russ Letlow; Carl Mulleneaux; Baby Ray; Bud Svendsen; Andy Uram	Ki Aldrich (Cardinals); Sammy Baugh (Redskins); Jim Benton (Rams); Tony Blazine (Cardinals); Joe Carter (Eagles); Ward Cuff (Giants); Turk Edwards (Redskins); Andy Farkas (Redskins); Frank Filchock (Redskins); Jack Johnson (Lions); Pug Manders (Dodgers); George Musso (Bears); Davey O'Brien (Eagles); Bill Osmanski (Bears); Bill Smith (Cardinals); Orville Tuttle (Giants)

=== Analysis ===
After the game, coach Lambeau noted that the game was a good exhibition to see how the younger players on the team would compete against the talent from around the league. Lambeau mentioned that the team's rookies played over half the game, with most of the team showing a willingness to compete. He continued by highlighting the play of Harry Jacunski, Charley Brock, Tom Greenfield, Larry Buhler, among others, while also mentioning his disappointment in Frank Balazs and Charles Schultz. The Green Bay Press-Gazette stated in their summary of the game that the Packers "put on a show for the customers" and that "writers and coaches agree after the game that it was a much better exhibition than the Chicago Bears put on in the first pro bowl game" the prior year. The All-Stars only had a few weeks to train and had never played a game together, which may have contributed to their underachievement.

== Legacy ==
The all-star game format, with the defending league champion playing against a team of all-stars from the remaining teams, was continued for three more years: with a game after the 1940, 1941 and 1942 seasons. The Packers did not win any league championships during this period and thus did not participate as a team in any subsequent all-star games, although some of their players were included in the next three all-star rosters. World War II caused a large impact to the NFL, with the league ending the all-star game after the 1942 NFL season due to wartime travel restrictions. After the 1950 NFL season, the NFL instituted a new all-star game format, called the Pro Bowl. The new format saw two teams being constructed completely of all-stars, with each team having their rosters constructed from players from each conference. This format continued until the 2010s, when the NFL implemented a fantasy draft format for roster construction, removing the conference restrictions. In 2022, the Pro Bowl Games began, with the actual game being replaced by skills competitions and a flag football game.
