= List of Penn Quakers in the NFL draft =

This is a list of Penn Quakers football players in the NFL draft.

== Key ==
B	Back	K	Kicker	NT	Nose tackle
C	Center	LB	Linebacker	FB	Fullback
DB	Defensive back	P	Punter	HB	Halfback
DE	Defensive end	QB	Quarterback	WR	Wide receiver
DT	Defensive tackle	RB	Running back	G	Guard
E	End	T	Offensive tackle	TE	Tight end

== Selections ==
Year	Round	Pick	Overall	Name	Team	Position
1937	2	1	11	Franny Murray	Philadelphia Eagles	B
1937	4	3	33	Bill Kurlish	Brooklyn Dodgers	B
1941	3	7	22	Frank Reagan	New York Giants	B
1941	5	8	38	Ray Frick	Brooklyn Dodgers	C
1942	15	7	137	Gene Davis	Brooklyn Dodgers	B
1943	12	2	102	Jack Donaldson	Philadelphia Eagles	T
1943	13	4	114	Bert Stiff	Brooklyn Dodgers	B
1943	14	7	127	Mort Shiekman	Pittsburgh Steelers	G
1943	19	1	171	Bert Kuczynski	Detroit Lions	E
1943	20	7	187	Johnny Welsh	Pittsburgh Steelers	B
1943	32	1	296	Bob Brundage	New York Giants	B
1944	2	4	15	Bob Odell	Pittsburgh Steelers	E
1944	18	9	184	Joe Kane	Philadelphia Eagles	B
1944	20	4	201	Bill Miller	Pittsburgh Steelers	B
1944	31	6	324	Ralph Calcagni	Boston Yanks	T
1945	21	7	215	Walt Stickel	Chicago Bears	T
1946	5	4	34	Don Schneider	Chicago Bears	B
1946	9	3	73	Bob Evans	Pittsburgh Steelers	B
1946	11	4	94	Eddie Allen	Chicago Bears	B
1946	23	1	211	Adam Rakowski	Chicago Cardinals	E
1947	5	5	30	George Savitsky	Philadelphia Eagles	T
1947	6	1	36	Bernie Gallagher	Detroit Lions	T
1947	7	1	46	Ed Grain	Detroit Lions	G
1947	29	10	275	Jerry McCarthy	Chicago Bears	E
1948	1	2	2	Skip Minisi	New York Giants	HB
1948	7	7	52	Bill Luongo	Pittsburgh Steelers	B
1948	11	3	88	Ed Marshall	Washington Redskins	T
1948	24	7	222	Art Littleton	Philadelphia Eagles	E
1948	29	4	269	Al Sica	Boston Yanks	B
1949	1	1	1	Chuck Bednarik	Philadelphia Eagles	C
1949	7	4	65	Bill Talarico	Pittsburgh Steelers	B
1949	9	8	89	Dolph Tokarczyk	Chicago Bears	G
1949	25	10	251	John Schweder	Philadelphia Eagles	G
1950	23	1	288	Harry Weittlaufer	Baltimore Colts	E
1950	29	1	366	Bob Graham	Baltimore Colts	B
1951	4	1	39	Bob Oristaglio	Cleveland Browns	E
1951	9	5	103	John Schweder	Pittsburgh Steelers	G
1951	11	11	134	Reds Bagnell	New York Giants	B
1951	21	11	254	Bernie Lemonick	New York Giants	G
1952	10	4	113	Gerry McGinley	Philadelphia Eagles	G
1953	5	7	56	Eddie Bell	Philadelphia Eagles	E
1953	26	4	305	Bob Evans	Chicago Bears	T
1954	23	12	277	Jack Shanafelt	Detroit Lions	T
1954	26	6	307	Joe Varaitis	Pittsburgh Steelers	B
1960	18	9	213	Jack Hanlon	Cleveland Browns	B
1968	10	25	271	Rick Owens	Oakland Raiders	DB
1974	5	3	107	Don Clune	New York Giants	WR
1975	17	25	441	Adolph Bellizeare	Minnesota Vikings	RB
1991	2	23	50	Joe Valerio	Kansas City Chiefs	T
1998	3	12	73	Mitch Marrow	Carolina Panthers	DE
1999	7	47	253	Jim Finn	Chicago Bears	RB
2002	3	13	78	Jeff Hatch	New York Giants	T
2018	5	7	144	Justin Watson	Tampa Bay Buccaneers	WR

== Notable undrafted players ==
Note: No drafts held before 1920

Debut year	Player name	Position	Debut NFL/AFL team	Notes
1946	Herb Nelson	E-T	Buffalo Bills	—
1946	Frank Quillen	E	Chicago Rockets	—
1949	Bob Oristaglio	DE	Buffalo Bills	—
1949	Bob Sponaugle	E	New York Bulldogs	—
1960	Fred Doelling	DB	Dallas Cowboys	—
1969	George Burrell	DB	Denver Broncos	—
1978	Mark Iwanowski	TE	New York Jets	—
1978	Tim Mazzetti	K	Atlanta Falcons	—
1982	Florian Kempf	K	Houston Oilers	—
1987	Jim Crocicchia	QB	New York Giants	—
1987	Marty Peterson	OL	Dallas Cowboys	—
1988	Brent Novoselsky	TE	Minnesota Vikings	—
1988	Donald Wilson	S	Seattle Seahawks	—
2002	Gavin Hoffman	QB	Cincinnati Bengals	—
2002	Kris Ryan	FB	Detroit Lions	—
2004	Ben Noll	G	St. Louis Rams	—
2012	Greg Van Roten	C	Green Bay Packers	—
2013	Brandon Copeland	LB	Baltimore Ravens	—
2016	Ryan O'Malley	TE	Oakland Raiders	—
2017	Alek Torgersen	QB	Atlanta Falcons	—
2022	Prince Emili	DT	Buffalo Bills	—
