= 1936 All-Eastern football team =

American all-star college football team

The 1936 All-Eastern football team consists of American football players chosen by various selectors as the best players at each position among the Eastern colleges and universities during the 1936 college football season.

== All-Eastern selections ==
=== Quarterbacks ===
- Clint Frank, Yale (AP-1, PW-1 [hb])
- Ken Sandbach, Princeton (AP-2, AK)
- Lew Elverson, Penn (PW-1)

=== Halfbacks ===
- Franny Murray, Penn (AP-1, AK)
- William T. Ingram II, Navy (AP-1)
- Bill Osmanski, Holy Cross (AK, PW-1 [fb])
- Marshall Goldberg, Pittsburgh (AP-2, PW-1)
- Boyd Brumbaugh, Duquesne (AP-2)

=== Fullbacks ===
- John Handrahan, Dartmouth (AP-1, AK)
- Bill Kurlish, Penn (AP-2)

=== Ends ===
- Larry Kelley, Yale (AP-1, AK, PW-1)
- Bill Daddio, Pittsburgh (AP-1, AK, PW-1)
- Babe Barna, West Virginia (AP-2)
- Jerome H. Holland, Cornell (AP-2)
- Walker, Temple (PW-2)
- Smith, Penn State (PW-2)

=== Tackles ===
- Ave Daniell, Pittsburgh (AP-1, PW-2)
- Charles Toll Jr., Princeton (AP-1, PW-2)
- Ed Franco, Fordham (AK)
- Bill Docherty, Temple (AK, PW-1)
- Red Chesbro, Colgate (PW-1)
- Tony Matisi, Pittsburgh (AP-2)
- Alex Kevorkian, Harvard (AP-2)

=== Guards ===
- Nathaniel Pierce, Fordham (AP-1, AK)
- Bill Glassford, Pittsburgh (AP-1, AK)
- France, Fordham (PW-1)
- Bill Montgomery, Princeton (AP-2, PW-1)
- Rivers Morrell, Navy (AP-2)
- Nestor Henrion, Carnegie Tech (PW-2)
- Gurzynski, Temple (PW-2)

=== Centers ===
- Mike Basrak, Duquesne (AP-1, PW-1)
- Alex Wojciechowicz, Fordham (AK)
- Jim Hauze, Penn (AP-2)

== Key ==
- AP = Associated Press
- AK = Andrew Kerr
- PW = Pop Warner

== See also ==
- 1936 College Football All-America Team
