= 1936 All-Big Ten Conference football team =

American college football all-star team

The 1936 All-Big Ten Conference football team consists of American football players selected to the All-Big Ten Conference teams chosen by various selectors for the 1936 Big Ten Conference football season.

== All Big-Ten selections ==
=== Ends ===
- Merle Wendt, Ohio State (AP-1; UP-1)
- Johnny Kovatch, Northwestern (AP-1; UP-1)
- Homer Harris, Iowa (UP-2)
- Matt Patanelli, Michigan (UP-2)

=== Tackles ===
- Ed Widseth, Minnesota (AP-1; UP-1)
- Charley Hamrick, Ohio State (AP-1; UP-1)
- DeWitt Gibson, Northwestern (UP-2)
- Ted Livingston, Indiana (UP-2)

=== Guards ===
- Steve Reid, Northwestern (AP-1; UP-1)
- Lester G. Schreiber, Northwestern (UP-1)
- Inwood Smith, Ohio State (AP-1; UP-2)
- Charles Schultz, Minnesota (UP-2)

=== Centers ===
- Ed Sayre, Illinois (AP-1; UP-1)
- George Svendsen, Minnesota (UP-2)

=== Quarterbacks ===
- Fred Vanzo, Northwestern (AP-1; UP-1)

=== Halfbacks ===
- Andy Uram, Minnesota (AP-1; UP-1)
- Don Heap, Northwestern (AP-1; UP-2)
- Vern Huffman, Indiana (UP-1)
- Bud Wilkinson, Minnesota (UP-2)

=== Fullbacks ===
- Cecil Isbell, Purdue (AP-1; UP-2 [halfback])
- Johnny Drake, Purdue (UP-1)
- Steve J. Toth, Northwestern (UP-2)

== Key ==
AP = Associated Press

UP = United Press

Bold = Consensus first-team selection of both the AP and UP

== See also ==
- 1936 College Football All-America Team
