= 1962 NFL season =

American football season

Regular season
- Duration: September 15 – December 30, 1962
- East Champions: New York Giants
- West Champions: Green Bay Packers

Championship Game
- Champions: Green Bay Packers

NFL teams: West, East

The 1962 NFL season was the 43rd regular season of the National Football League (NFL). Before the season, CBS signed a contract with the league to televise all regular-season games for a $4.65 million annual fee.

The season ended on December 30, when the Green Bay Packers defeated the New York Giants 16–7 in the NFL Championship Game at Yankee Stadium. The Packers successfully defended their 1961 NFL title, finishing the 1962 season at 14–1; their only loss was to the Detroit Lions on Thanksgiving Day at Tiger Stadium. Green Bay's 14 wins matched the most victories in a single NFL season, tying the 1926 Frankford Yellow Jackets.

== Draft ==
The 1962 NFL draft was held on December 4, 1961, at Chicago's Sheraton Hotel & Towers. With the first pick, the Washington Redskins selected running back Ernie Davis from Syracuse University.

== Major rule changes ==
- Grabbing any player's facemask is prohibited.

== Deaths ==
- June 13 - Ed Quirk, age 37. Played linebacker and running back for the Washington Redskins from 1948 to 1951.
- July 7 - Frank Balazs, age 44. Played fullback and linebacker for the Green Bay Packers and Chicago Cardinals from 1939 to 1941.

== Hall of Fame Game ==
The preseason Hall of Fame Game in Canton, Ohio, debuted this year, following the morning groundbreaking for the Pro Football Hall of Fame on Saturday, August 11. The New York Giants and St. Louis Cardinals played to a 21–21 tie.

== Division races ==
The Green Bay Packers won their first ten games, until losing 26–14 on November 22 at Detroit. The Lions' win put them a game behind the Pack rather than 2 games behind, but in the final week, they lost to Chicago, 3–0. Even a Lions win would have been made moot when Green Bay won 20–17 at L.A. to finish with a record of 13–1.

In the Eastern Division, the Redskins were unbeaten after six games. Their four wins and two ties would have been an .833 record in later years, but in 1962, a tie game was not counted at all. In Week Seven (October 28), the Giants handed the Skins their first loss, 49–34. When Washington lost again the next week, 38–10 to Dallas, the Giants 31–28 win over St. Louis gave them a 6–2 record and the division lead. The Giants rode a nine-game winning streak to capture the Eastern title and the right to host the title game against Green Bay.

Week	Western Conference	Record	Eastern Conference	Record
1	4 teams (Bal, Chi, Det, GB)	1–0–0	Tie (Cle, St.L)	1–0–0
2	4 teams (Bal, Chi, Det, GB)	2–0–0	Washington Redskins	1–0–1
3	Tie (Det, GB)	3–0–0	Washington Redskins	2–0–1
4	Green Bay Packers	4–0–0	Washington Redskins	3–0–1
5	Green Bay Packers	5–0–0	Washington Redskins	3–0–2
6	Green Bay Packers	6–0–0	Washington Redskins	4–0–2
7	Green Bay Packers	7–0–0	Washington Redskins	4–1–2
8	Green Bay Packers	8–0–0	New York Giants	6–2–0
9	Green Bay Packers	9–0–0	New York Giants	7–2–0
10	Green Bay Packers	10–0–0	New York Giants	8–2–0
11	Green Bay Packers	10–1–0	New York Giants	9–2–0
12	Green Bay Packers	11–1–0	New York Giants	10–2–0
13	Green Bay Packers	12–1–0	New York Giants	11–2–0
14	Green Bay Packers	13–1–0	New York Giants	12–2–0

== Final standings ==
NFL Eastern Conference
	W	L	T	PCT	CONF	PF	PA	STK
New York Giants	12	2	0	.857	10–2	398	283	W9
Pittsburgh Steelers	9	5	0	.643	8–4	312	363	W3
Cleveland Browns	7	6	1	.538	6–5–1	291	257	W1
Washington Redskins	5	7	2	.417	4–6–2	305	376	L1
Dallas Cowboys	5	8	1	.385	4–7–1	398	402	L2
St. Louis Cardinals	4	9	1	.308	4–7–1	287	361	W2
Philadelphia Eagles	3	10	1	.231	3–8–1	282	356	L2

Note: Tie games were not officially counted in the standings until 1972.

NFL Western Conference
	W	L	T	PCT	CONF	PF	PA	STK
Green Bay Packers	13	1	0	.929	11–1	415	148	W3
Detroit Lions	11	3	0	.786	10–2	315	177	L1
Chicago Bears	9	5	0	.643	8–4	321	287	W2
Baltimore Colts	7	7	0	.500	5–7	293	288	W2
San Francisco 49ers	6	8	0	.429	5–7	282	331	L2
Minnesota Vikings	2	11	1	.154	1–10–1	254	410	L3
Los Angeles Rams	1	12	1	.077	1–10–1	220	334	L3

== Postseason ==
=== NFL Championship Game ===
- Green Bay 16, New York 7 at Yankee Stadium in New York City on December 30.

=== Playoff Bowl ===
The Playoff Bowl was between the division runners-up, for third place in the league. This was its third year (of ten) and it was played a week after the title game.

- Detroit 17, Pittsburgh 10 at Orange Bowl in Miami, Florida, on January 6, 1963.

== Awards ==
Most Valuable Player	Jim Taylor, Fullback, Green Bay
Coach of the Year	Allie Sherman, New York Giants

== Coaching changes ==
=== Offseason ===
- St. Louis Cardinals: Wally Lemm became the team's new head coach. Pop Ivy resigned after the twelfth game (5–7) in 1961. assistants Chuck Drulis, Ray Prochaska, and Ray Willsey served as co-head coaches for the final two games of that season, both wins.

=== In-season ===
- Los Angeles Rams: Bob Waterfield resigned after eight games (1–7), succeeded by defensive line coach Harland Svare (0–5–1).

== See also ==
- 1962 American Football League season
