= Harry Jacunski =

American football player and coach (1915–2003)

No. 48
- Position: End

Personal information
- Born: October 20, 1915; New Britain, Connecticut, U.S.
- Died: February 20, 2003 (aged 87); Wallingford, Connecticut, U.S.
- Listed height: 6 ft 2 in (1.88 m)
- Listed weight: 200 lb (91 kg)

Career information
- High school: New Britain
- College: Fordham (1935-1938)
- NFL draft: 1939: undrafted

Career history
- Green Bay Packers (1939–1944)

Awards and highlights
- 2× NFL champion (1939, 1944); Pro Bowl (1939); Green Bay Packers Hall of Fame; Second-team All-Eastern (1938)

Career NFL statistics
- Receptions: 52
- Receiving yards: 985
- Touchdowns: 6
- Stats at Pro Football Reference

Hieronym Anthony “Harry” Jacunski (October 20, 1915 – February 20, 2003) was an American football player and coach. He played as an end for the Green Bay Packers of the National Football League (NFL). After his playing career, he was a college football coach for 35 years.

Jacunski was an all-state center on the New Britain High School 1934 basketball team and played college football with Vince Lombardi at Fordham University, where Jacunski was one of Fordham's "Seven Blocks of Granite". In 1938 he was co-captain of the Fordham football team where he started as end.

He played in the NFL for six seasons (1939 – 1944) as defensive end for the Green Bay Packers, who were NFL champions in 1939 and 1944.

In 1945 he started a 35-year coaching career: one year at University of Notre Dame, two years at Harvard University, and the last 33 years at Yale University. Jacunski was inducted into both the Fordham and Green Bay Packers Hall of Fame.

== NFL career statistics ==
Legend
	Won the NFL Championship
	Led the league
**Bold**	Career high

=== Regular season ===
Year	Team	Games		Receiving				
Year	Team	GP	GS	Rec	Yds	Avg	Lng	TD
1939	GNB	11	2	5	104	20.8	29	2
1940	GNB	10	5	2	29	14.5	17	0
1941	GNB	10	7	4	48	12.0	27	0
1942	GNB	5	1	8	125	15.6	49	1
1943	GNB	10	9	**24**	**528**	**22.0**	**86**	**3**
1944	GNB	9	9	9	151	16.8	48	0
		55	33	52	985	18.9	86	6

=== Playoffs ===
Year	Team	Games		Receiving				
Year	Team	GP	GS	Rec	Yds	Avg	Lng	TD
1939	GNB	1	0	**1**	**31**	**31.0**	**31**	0
1941	GNB	1	0	0	0	0.0	0	0
1944	GNB	1	1	0	0	0.0	0	0
		3	1	1	31	31.0	31	0
