= Ave Daniell =

American football player (1914–1999)

No. 23, 14
- Position: Tackle

Personal information
- Born: November 6, 1914; Pittsburgh, Pennsylvania, U.S.
- Died: January 28, 1999 (aged 84); Pittsburgh, Pennsylvania, U.S.
- Listed height: 6 ft 3 in (1.91 m)
- Listed weight: 215 lb (98 kg)

Career information
- High school: Mt. Lebanon (Mt. Lebanon, Pennsylvania)
- College: Pittsburgh
- NFL draft: 1937: 2nd round, 19th overall pick

Career history
- Brooklyn Dodgers (1937); Green Bay Packers (1937)

Awards and highlights
- 2× National champion (1934, 1936); Consensus All-American (1936); First-team All-Eastern (1936); 1937 National Championship Team Captain; Rose Bowl champion (1936)

Career NFL statistics
- Games played: 9
- Games started: 3
- Stats at Pro Football Reference
- College Football Hall of Fame

Averell Edward "Li'l Abner" Daniell (November 6, 1914 – January 28, 1999) was an American professional football tackle. He played high school football for Mt. Lebanon High School and college football for the University of Pittsburgh as a walk-on. He played professionally for the Brooklyn Dodgers and the Green Bay Packers in the National Football League (NFL). He was selected in the second round of the 1937 NFL draft. After leaving football, he founded the Ionics Corp., which was later sold to GE. He was elected to the College Football Hall of Fame in 1975.
