= 1936 All-America college football team =

Official list of the best college football players of 1936

The 1936 All-America college football team is composed of college football players who were selected as All-Americans by various organizations and writers that chose All-America college football teams in 1936. The nine selectors recognized by the NCAA as "official" for the 1936 season are (1) Collier's Weekly, as selected by Grantland Rice, (2) the Associated Press (AP), (3) the United Press (UP), (4) the All-America Board (AAB), (5) the International News Service (INS), (6) Liberty magazine, (7) the Newspaper Enterprise Association (NEA), (8) the North American Newspaper Alliance (NANA), and (9) the Sporting News (SN).

== Consensus All-Americans ==
For the year 1936, the NCAA recognizes nine published All-American teams as "official" designations for purposes of its consensus determinations. The following chart identifies the NCAA-recognized consensus All-Americans and displays which first-team designations they received.

Name	Position	School	Number	Official	Other
Larry Kelley	End	Yale	9/9	AAB, AP, COL, INS, LIB, NANA, NEA, SN, UP	CP, WC
Gaynell Tinsley	End	LSU	9/9	AAB, AP, COL, INS, LIB, NANA, NEA, SN, UP	CP, WC
Sam Francis	Fullback	Nebraska	9/9	AAB, AP, COL, INS, LIB, NANA, NEA, SN, UP	WC
Ed Widseth	Tackle	Minnesota	9/9	AAB, AP, COL, INS, LIB, NANA, NEA, SN, UP	CP, WC
Ace Parker	Halfback	Duke	7/9	AAB, AP, INS, LIB, NANA, SN, UP	CP, WC
Steve Reid	Guard	Northwestern	6/9	AAB, COL, LIB, NANA, NEA, SN	WC
Sammy Baugh	Quarterback	TCU	6/9	COL, INS, NANA, NEA, SN, UP	CP
Ray Buivid	Halfback	Marquette	6/9	AP, COL, LIB, NANA, NEA, SN	CP
Max Starcevich	Guard	Washington	5/9	AAB, AP, COL, INS, UP	CP, WC
Ave Daniell	Tackle	Pittsburgh	4/9	AP, COL, NEA, UP	CP
Mike Basrak	Center	Duquesne	4/9	AAB, AP, INS, LIB	CP, WC
Alex Wojciechowicz	Center	Fordham	3/9	COL, NEA, SN	--

== All-American selections for 1936 ==
=== Ends ===
- Larry Kelley, Yale (College Football Hall of Fame) (AAB; AP-1; COL-1; INS-1; LIB-1; NANA; NEA-1; SN; UP-1; CP-1; WC-1)
- Gaynell Tinsley, LSU (College Football Hall of Fame) (AAB; AP-1; COL-1; INS-1; LIB-1; NANA; NEA-1; SN; UP-1; CP-1; WC-1)
- Matt Patanelli, Michigan (AP-3; CP-2)
- Andy Bershak, North Carolina (AP-2)
- Merle Wendt, Ohio State (AP-2; INS-3)
- Joe O'Neill, Notre Dame (CP-2)
- Bill Daddio, Pittsburgh (AP-3; INS-3)
- Johnny Kovatch, Northwestern (INS-2)
- Jim Benton, Arkansas (INS-2)

Maurice Patt Carnegie Tech

=== Tackles ===
- Ed Widseth, Minnesota (College Football Hall of Fame) (AAB; AP-1; COL-1; INS-1; LIB-1; NANA; NEA-1; SN; UP-1; CP-1; WC-1)
- Ave Daniell, Pittsburgh (College Football Hall of Fame) (AP-1; COL-1; NEA-1; UP-1; CP-1; INS-2)
- Frank Kinard, Mississippi (College and Pro Football Hall of Fame) (AAB; AP-3; INS-1; WC-1)
- Red Chesbro, Colgate (LIB-1)
- Charles Toll, Princeton (AP-2)
- Charley Hamrick, Ohio State (AP-2; INS-3)
- Bill Moss, Tulane (CP-2)
- Ed Franco, Fordham (College Football Hall of Fame) (AP-3; CP-2; SN; NANA)
- Clarence Strange, LSU (INS-2)
- Chuck Bond, Washington (INS-3)

=== Guards ===
- Max Starcevich, Washington (College Football Hall of Fame) (AAB; AP-1; COL-1; INS-1; UP-1; CP-1; WC-1)
- Steve Reid, Northwestern (College Football Hall of Fame) (AAB; AP-3; COL-1; LIB-1; NANA; NEA-1; SN; CP-2; WC-1; INS-2)
- Joe Routt, Texas A&M (AP-1; LIB-1, INS-2)
- Bill Glassford, Pittsburgh (AP-3; INS-1; CP-2; NANA)
- John Lautar, Notre Dame (UP-1; INS-3)
- Alex Drobnitch, Denver (NEA-1)
- Art White, Alabama (AP-2; CP-1; SN; INS-3)
- Nathaniel Pierce, Fordham (AP-2)

=== Centers ===
- Alex Wojciechowicz, Fordham (College and Pro Football Hall of Fame) (COL-1; NEA-1; SN; CP-2)
- Mike Basrak, Duquesne (AAB; AP-1; INS-1; LIB-1; CP-1; WC-1)
- Bob Herwig, California (College Football Hall of Fame) (AP-2; NANA; UP-1; INS-2)
- Walter Gilbert, Auburn (College Football Hall of Fame) (AP-3; INS-3)

=== Quarterbacks ===
- Sammy Baugh, TCU (College and Pro Football Hall of Fame) (AP-2 [hb]; COL-1; INS-1 [hb]; NANA; NEA-1 [hb]; SN; UP-1; CP-1)
- Ed Goddard, Washington State (second pick in the 1937 NFL draft) (AP-3; NEA-1; UP-1; CP-2; INS-2)
- Clint Frank, Yale (College Football Hall of Fame) (AP-1; COL-1 [hb]; INS-3)
- Franny Murray, Penn (AP-2)

=== Halfbacks ===
- Ace Parker, Duke (College and Pro Football Hall of Fame) (AAB; AP-1; INS-1; LIB-1 [qb]; SN; NANA; UP-1; CP-1 [fb]; WC-1)
- Ray Buivid, Marquette (AP-1; COL-1; LIB-1; NANA; NEA-1; SN; CP-1; INS-2)
- Nello Falaschi, Santa Clara (College Football Hall of Fame) (AAB [qb]; AP-3; INS-1; WC-1; AA)
- Don Heap, Northwestern (CP-1)
- Kent Ryan, Utah State (AAB; WC-1)
- Andy Uram, Minnesota (AP-2; CP-2; SN; INS-2)
- Joe Riley, Alabama (CP-1; INS-2)
- Jimmie Cain, Washington (LIB-1)
- Philip Dickens, Tennessee (AP-3)
- Bill Osmanski, Holy Cross (INS-3)
- Byron Haines, Washington (INS-3)

=== Fullbacks ===
- Sam Francis, Nebraska (College Football Hall of Fame) (first pick in the 1937 NFL draft) (AAB; AP-1; COL-1; INS-1; LIB-1; NANA; NEA-1; LIB-1; UP-1; CP-2; WC-1)
- Cecil Isbell, Purdue (AP-2)
- John Handrahan, Dartmouth (AP-3)
- Bill Kurlish, Penn (INS-3)

== Key ==
Bold = Consensus All-American

- -1 – First-team selection
- -2 – Second-team selection
- -3 – Third-team selection

=== Official selectors ===
- AAB = All-America Board
- AP = Associated Press
- COL = Collier's Weekly
- INS = International News Service
- LIB = Liberty magazine, "the All-Players All-American eleven, as announced by the editors of Liberty magazine"
- NANA = North American Newspaper Alliance
- NEA = Newspaper Enterprise Association
- SN = The Sporting News
- UP = United Press

=== Other selectors ===
- CP = Central Press Association: "In the sixth annual Captains' All-American, selected by more than 50 gridiron leaders of important universities and colleges throughout the United States, the East is represented at three positions."
- WC = Walter Camp Football Foundation

== See also ==
- 1936 Little All-America college football team
- 1936 All-Big Six Conference football team
- 1936 All-Big Ten Conference football team
- 1936 All-Pacific Coast Conference football team
- 1936 All-SEC football team
