= Merle Wendt =

American football player (1915–2000)

Profile
- Position: End

Personal information
- Born: April 7, 1915
- Died: February 12, 2000 (aged 84)

Career information
- College: Ohio State (1935)

Awards and highlights
- 2× First-team All-American (1934, 1935); Second-team All-American (1936); 3× First-team All-Big Ten (1934, 1935, 1936)

Merle Wendt (April 7, 1915 – February 12, 2000) was an All-American football player at Ohio State University. Wendt played at the end position and became the fourth three-time All-American (1934–1936) at Ohio State, following Chic Harley, Wes Fesler, and Lew Hinchman.

== Biography ==
Wendt was a native of Middletown, Ohio, the "quiet, smiling and bashful son of a foreman in the steam fitting department of the American Rolling Mills." Wendt played basketball all four years at Middletown High School and played football on Elmo Lingrel's teams his sophomore, Junior and senior years. He was the captain of the football team during his senior year and also the class (1933) president. Wendt was highly recruited out of high school and received an offer from University of Southern California coach (and Butler County, Ohio native) Howard Jones to play for the Trojans. Wendt opted instead to accept an offer to play for the Ohio State Buckeyes under head coach Francis Schmidt. Schmidt tried Wendt at the center position at the start of the 1934 season and eventually moved the speedy Wendt to the end position. He was a member of the Tau Kappa Epsilon fraternity and worked his way through college as a caretaker at his fraternity house where he was responsible for firing the furnace, sweeping walks and shoveling snow. Wendt was a starter for the Ohio State Buckeyes football team from 1934 to 1936 and was captain of the 1936 team. Wendt was five feet eleven inches tall, and weighed 190 pounds. He was described as "A great pass catcher, hard tackier and tops in defense." Upon his selection as captain, one Ohio newspaper wrote: "A superb defensive man, the 188 pound flanker teamed with Gomer Jones, Cleveland, whom he succeeds at the Ohio helm, in leading the charge of the forward wall of Francis Schmidt's eleven."

Wendt was selected as an All-Western Conference end as a sophomore in 1934. He was also selected as a first-team All-American in 1934 by the International News Service—the Hearst newspapers wire service. In 1935, Wendt was selected as a first-team All-American by Liberty (based on "a poll of 1521 varsity players in all parts of the country") and the Newspaper Editors Association. He was also as second-team selection of the United Press, North American Newspaper Alliance, and Central Press in 1935.

Wendt became a popular figure through the state of Ohio, with newspapers covering the details of his personal life, including his interest in "nature study" and his love of Mexican food:

"It's easy enough to see why Merle Wendt is the sort that makes feminine hearts flutter, but why this good-looking captain of the Ohio State university eleven should prefer chili con carne to chicken is beyond

us. Merle, you see, isn't Mexican nor Spanish, just plain American, but he'd rather have a bowl than a broiler, so that's that. But if Ohio State's leading chili hound can keep on playing football the way he has been from his end position, we'd say let him eat all the chili con carne

he can pack in."

Wendt played on Ohio State teams that defeated the Michigan Wolverines three straight years by a combined score of 93–0. In 1936, Wendt was asked about his greatest thrill: "After no undue amount of deliberation Merle decided that his greatest thrill was the time he caught the winning touchdown pass against Michigan in 1934."

Wendt's brothers, Chester and Emerson, also played basketball and football at Ohio State.

Wendt was drafted in the sixth round of the 1937 NFL Draft. Wendt had offers to play professional football from seven NFL teams, but opted instead to pursue a career in chemical engineering. He spent his years in college working for the then burger stand McDonald's. He married his wife, June Stone, six days after receiving his degree in chemical engineering. For many years, Wendt was the director of chemical engineering for Goodyear Tire and Rubber Co. in Akron, Ohio.

== See also ==
- 1934 College Football All-America Team
- 1935 College Football All-America Team
- 1936 College Football All-America Team
