= Lou Brock (American football) =

American football player (1917–1989)

No. 15, 16
- Positions: Quarterback, running back, defensive back, punter

Personal information
- Born: December 9, 1917; Stafford, Kansas, U.S.
- Died: May 7, 1989 (aged 71); Stafford, Kansas, U.S.
- Listed height: 6 ft 0 in (1.83 m)
- Listed weight: 195 lb (88 kg)

Career information
- High school: Stafford
- College: Purdue (1936-1939)
- NFL draft: 1940: 3rd round, 24th overall pick

Career history
- Green Bay Packers (1940–1945)

Awards and highlights
- NFL champion (1944); Green Bay Packers Hall of Fame (1982); First-team All-Big Ten (1938)

Career NFL statistics
- Rushing yards: 804
- Rushing average: 3.2
- Receptions: 59
- Receiving yards: 761
- Total touchdowns: 16
- Stats at Pro Football Reference

James Lewis "Lou" Brock (December 9, 1917 – May 7, 1989) was an American professional football player who played college football for Purdue. He was drafted in the third round of the 1940 NFL draft and played his entire six-year career with the Green Bay Packers. He was inducted into the Green Bay Packers Hall of Fame in 1982.

== NFL career statistics ==
Legend
	Won the NFL Championship
**Bold**	Career high

Year	Team	Games		Rushing					Receiving				
Year	Team	GP	GS	Att	Yds	Avg	Lng	TD	Rec	Yds	Avg	Lng	TD
1940	GNB	11	4	18	60	3.3	-	0	5	97	19.4	33	0
1941	GNB	11	4	14	44	3.1	14	0	**22**	**307**	14.0	36	**2**
1942	GNB	11	4	**95**	**237**	2.5	24	2	20	139	7.0	29	1
1943	GNB	10	8	45	67	1.5	9	2	4	57	14.3	32	1
1944	GNB	5	5	36	200	**5.6**	**42**	**3**	4	74	18.5	**52**	**2**
1945	GNB	10	4	46	196	4.3	28	**3**	4	87	**21.8**	46	0
Career		58	29	254	804	3.2	42	10	59	761	12.9	52	6
