= Vern Huffman =

American football and basketball player (1914–1995)

- Huffman in his Indiana basketball uniform, circa 1936

No. 6
- Positions: Halfback, quarterback

Personal information
- Born: December 18, 1914; Mooreland, Indiana, U.S.
- Died: March 18, 1995 (aged 80); Bloomington, Indiana, U.S.
- Listed height: 6 ft 2 in (1.88 m)
- Listed weight: 215 lb (98 kg)

Career information
- High school: New Castle (New Castle, Indiana)
- College: Indiana
- NFL draft: 1937: 3rd round, 27th overall pick

Career history
- Detroit Lions (1937–1938)

Awards and highlights
- Chicago Tribune Silver Football (1936); First-team All-Big Ten (1936); Indiana Hoosiers Hall of Fame (1982)

Career NFL statistics
- Rushing yards: 368
- Rushing average: 3.5
- Receptions: 9
- Receiving yards: 121
- Passing yards: 484
- TD–INT: 3-14
- Stats at Pro Football Reference

Richard Vernon Huffman (December 18, 1914 – March 18, 1995) was an American professional football and basketball player. He was born in Mooreland, Indiana and was raised in and around New Castle, Indiana.

He played basketball for the New Castle High School team that won the Indiana state basketball championship in 1932. He enrolled at Indiana University in 1932 and played both football and basketball there. He was an All-American in both basketball and football at Indiana and won the 1936 Chicago Tribune Silver Football as the best football player in the Big Ten Conference.

He was drafted in the third round of the 1937 NFL Draft. He played two seasons of professional football in the National Football League for the Detroit Lions in 1937 and 1938. Huffman later managed a dairy and worked for the Federal Bureau of Investigation. He was inducted into the Indiana Hoosiers Hall of Fame in 1982. Huffman died in 1995 at age 80 in Bloomington, Indiana.

Huffman's brother Marv was also an All-American basketball player at Indiana and later played professionally with the Akron Goodyear Wingfoots of the National Basketball League.
