= 1940 Chicago Cardinals season =

American football team season

- Head coach: Jimmy Conzelman
- Home stadium: Comiskey Park

Results
- Record: 2–7–2
- Division place: 5th NFL Western
- Playoffs: Did not qualify

The 1940 Chicago Cardinals season marked their 21st year in the National Football League (NFL). While the team improved on their previous output of 1–10 by winning 2 games, they nevertheless missed the Championship Playoff for the 8th consecutive season.

== Schedule ==
Week	Date	Opponent	Result	Record	Venue	Attendance	Recap	Sources
1	September 8	at Pittsburgh Steelers	**T** 7–7	0–0–1	Forbes Field	22,000	Recap	
2	September 15	**Detroit Lions**	**T** 0–0	0–0–2	War Memorial Stadium	18,048	Recap	
3	September 25	**Chicago Bears**	**W** 21–7	1–0–2	Comiskey Park	23,181	Recap	
4	September 29	at **Green Bay Packers**	**L** 6–31	1–1–2	State Fair Park	20234	Recap	
5	October 5	at Detroit Lions	**L** 14–43	1–2–2	Dinan Field	20,619	Recap	
6	October 13	at Washington Redskins	**L** 21–28	1–3–2	Griffith Stadium	33,691	Recap	
7	October 20	at **Cleveland Rams**	**L** 14–26	1–4–2	Cleveland Stadium	13,363	Recap	
8	October 27	**Cleveland Rams**	**W** 17–7	2–4–2	Comiskey Park	10,313	Recap	
—	Bye							
9	November 10	**Green Bay Packers**	**L** 7–28	2–5–2	Comiskey Park	11,364	Recap	
—	Bye							
10	November 24	at Brooklyn Dodgers	**L** 9–14	2–6–2	Ebbets Field	16,619	Recap	
11	December 1	at **Chicago Bears**	**L** 23–31	2–7–2	Wrigley Field	13,902	Recap	
Note: Intra-division opponents are in **bold** text.

== Standings ==
NFL Western Division
	W	L	T	PCT	DIV	PF	PA	STK
Chicago Bears	8	3	0	.727	6–2	238	152	W2
Green Bay Packers	6	4	1	.600	4–3–1	238	155	T1
Detroit Lions	5	5	1	.500	4–3–1	138	153	L1
Cleveland Rams	4	6	1	.400	2–5–1	171	191	T1
Chicago Cardinals	2	7	2	.222	2–5–1	139	222	L3

Note: Tie games were not officially counted in the standings until 1972.
