= Shag Goolsby =

American football player (1917–1975)

No. 24
- Position: Center

Personal information
- Born: July 24, 1917; Columbus, Mississippi, U.S.
- Died: May 7, 1975 (aged 57); Columbus, Mississippi, U.S.
- Listed height: 6 ft 2 in (1.88 m)
- Listed weight: 198 lb (90 kg)

Career information
- High school: Stephen D. Lee (MS)
- College: Mississippi State
- NFL draft: 1940: 12th round, 105th overall pick

Career history
- Cleveland Rams (1940)

Career NFL statistics
- Games played: 8
- Stats at Pro Football Reference

James Earl "Shag" Goolsby (July 24, 1917 – May 7, 1975) was an American professional football center.

Goolsby was born in Columbus, Mississippi, in 1917. He attended Stephen D. Lee High School in Columbus and then enrolled at Mississippi State University. He played for the Mississippi State Bulldogs football team from 1937 to 1939.

He was selected by the Cleveland Rams in the 12th round (105th overall pick) of the 1940 NFL draft. He appeared in eight games for the Rams during the 1940 season.

After retiring from football, he returned to Mississippi and worked as a coach and teacher in Winona and Gulport. During World War II, he served in the military. After the war, he worked for the Brandon schools. From 1946 to 1950, he was the principal and athletic director of Aberdeen High School. In 1953, he was hired as assistant superintendent of the Columbus public schools. He retired as superintendent of the Columbus public schools. He died from an apparent heart attack at age 57 in 1975.
