= Inwood Smith =

American football player (1915–1995)

Ohio State Buckeyes
- Position: Guard

Personal information
- Born: November 26, 1915
- Died: January 15, 1995 (aged 79)

Career information
- College: Ohio State (1935)

Awards and highlights
- First-team All-American (1935); First-team All-Big Ten (1936)

William Inwood Smith (November 26, 1915 – January 15, 1995) was an All-American football player for the Ohio State University Buckeyes in the mid-1930s. He was drafted in the fifth round of the 1937 NFL Draft with the 50th overall pick. A native of New Jersey, he moved with his family to Mansfield, Ohio as a boy. In addition to football, Smith was a competitive swimmer, basketball player, and track and field athlete. At the end of the 1935 college football season, Smith was selected as a first-team All-American by Grantland Rice for Collier's Weekly and by a board of coaches for Pathé News.

Smith was previously reported to have played for the Cincinnati Bengals of the second American Football League in 1937 and 1940. The error was corrected after Smith was interviewed in the early 1990s and confirmed that he had never played professional football. Smith stated that he had negotiated with the Cleveland Rams but did not reach and agreement and did not appear in any games. He stated that "in the end I decided to continue with building up a career in business...Of course, pro football in those days was not truly 'accepted' and the compensation (on a per game basis) was by today’s standards ridiculously low."

After graduating from Ohio State, Smith was employed by the Westinghouse Electric Manufacturing Co. in Grand Rapids, Michigan, and Cleveland. During World War II, Smith became district supervisor of the Office of Price Administration in Columbus, Ohio.

== See also ==
- 1935 College Football All-America Team
