= Tom Greenfield =

American football player (1917–2004)

No. 56
- Positions: Center, Linebacker

Personal information
- Born: November 10, 1917; Glendale, Arizona, U.S.
- Died: October 9, 2004 (aged 86)
- Listed height: 6 ft 4 in (1.93 m)
- Listed weight: 213 lb (97 kg)

Career information
- High school: Peoria (AZ)
- College: Arizona (1935-1938)
- NFL draft: 1939: 15th round, 139th overall pick

Career history
- Green Bay Packers (1939–1941)

Awards and highlights
- NFL champion (1939); Pro Bowl (1939)

Career NFL statistics
- Games played: 22
- Games started: 3
- Interceptions: 1
- Stats at Pro Football Reference

Thomas Guy Greenfield (November 10, 1917 – October 9, 2004) was an American professional football center/linebacker in the National Football League (NFL). He was selected in the 15th round of the 1939 NFL draft with the 139th overall pick. Greenfield, who was born in Glendale, Arizona, played for the Green Bay Packers from 1939 to 1941. A member of the 1939 NFL Champion Packers, he played in the annual All-Star Game that year. He played college football at the University of Arizona, where he was a member of the Sigma Alpha Epsilon fraternity.
