= Johnny Drake =

American football player (1916–1973)

No. 2, 14
- Positions: Fullback, halfback

Personal information
- Born: March 27, 1916; Chicago, Illinois, U.S.
- Died: March 26, 1973 (aged 56); Detroit, Michigan, U.S.
- Listed height: 6 ft 1 in (1.85 m)
- Listed weight: 213 lb (97 kg)

Career information
- High school: Bowen (Chicago)
- College: Purdue (1933-1936)
- NFL draft: 1937: 1st round, 10th overall pick

Career history
- Cleveland Rams (1937–1941)

Awards and highlights
- First-team All-Pro (1940); Second-team All-Pro (1938); 3× NFL All-Star (1938–1940); 2× NFL rushing touchdowns leader (1939, 1940); First-team All-Big Ten (1936)

Career NFL statistics
- Rushing yards: 1,700
- Rushing average: 3.2
- Receptions: 41
- Receiving yards: 530
- Total touchdowns: 27
- Stats at Pro Football Reference

John William "Zero" Drake (March 27, 1916 – March 26, 1973) was an American professional football player who was a running back for the Cleveland Rams of the National Football League (NFL). He played college football for the Purdue Boilermakers. Drake was the first round pick (10th overall) by the Rams, their first ever draft pick, in the 1937 NFL draft. He led the NFL in touchdowns in the 1939 and 1940 seasons.

== NFL career statistics ==
Legend
	Led the league
**Bold**	Career high

Year	Team	Games		Rushing				Receiving			
Year	Team	GP	GS	Att	Yds	Avg	TD	Rec	Yds	Avg	TD
1937	CLE	11	9	98	333	3.4	3	10	172	**17.2**	**2**
1938	CLE	11	8	74	188	2.5	1	2	13	6.5	0
1939	CLE	11	11	118	453	**3.8**	**9**	5	53	10.6	0
1940	CLE	11	8	**134**	**480**	3.6	**9**	8	81	10.1	0
1941	CLE	11	8	101	246	2.4	2	**16**	**211**	13.2	1
		55	44	525	1,700	3.2	24	41	530	12.9	3
