= Ted Livingston =

American football player (1913–1984)

Profile
- Position: Tackle / Guard

Personal information
- Born: February 18, 1913; Ellsworth, Kansas, U.S.
- Died: June 8, 1984 (aged 71); Cleveland, Ohio, U.S.
- Listed height: 6 ft 3 in (1.91 m)
- Listed weight: 219 lb (99 kg)

Career information
- College: Indiana

Career history
- Cleveland Rams (1937–1940)

Awards and highlights
- Second-team All-Big Ten (1936)
- Stats at Pro Football Reference

Theodore Alfred Livingston (February 18, 1913 – June 8, 1984) was an American football player who played professionally for four seasons in the National Football League (NFL) with the Cleveland Rams.
