= Johnny Hackenbruck =

American football player (1915–1988)

- Hackenbruck, 1938

No. 25
- Position: Tackle

Personal information
- Born: October 20, 1915; The Dalles, Oregon, U.S.
- Died: October 26, 1988 (aged 73); Corvallis, Oregon, U.S.
- Listed height: 6 ft 2 in (1.88 m)
- Listed weight: 215 lb (98 kg)

Career information
- High school: The Dalles
- College: Oregon State
- NFL draft: 1940: 17th round, 156th overall pick

Career history
- Detroit Lions (1940)

Career NFL statistics
- Games played: 7
- Games started: 2
- Stats at Pro Football Reference

John Anthony Hackenbruck (October 20, 1915 – October 26, 1988) was an American professional football player.

A native of The Dalles, Oregon, Thomas attended The Dalles High School and then played college football as a tackle for Oregon State from 1936 to 1939. He was selected as a captain on the 1939 team.

In December 1939, he was selected by the Detroit Lions with the 156th pick in the 1940 NFL draft. He signed with the Lions in April 1940. He appeared in seven games for the Lions as a tackle during the 1940 season.
