= Larry Buhler =

American football player (1917–1990)

- Buhler in his University of Minnesota sweater

No. 52
- Positions: Fullback, Halfback

Personal information
- Born: May 28, 1917; Mountain Lake, Minnesota, U.S.
- Died: August 21, 1990 (aged 73); Rochester, Minnesota, U.S.
- Listed height: 6 ft 2 in (1.88 m)
- Listed weight: 210 lb (95 kg)

Career information
- High school: Windom (MN)
- College: Minnesota (1935-1938)
- NFL draft: 1939: 1st round, 9th overall pick

Career history
- Green Bay Packers (1939–1941)

Awards and highlights
- NFL champion (1939); Pro Bowl (1939); National champion (1936); 2× Second-team All-Big Ten (1937, 1938)

Career NFL statistics
- Rushing yards: 121
- Rushing average: 3
- Interceptions: 2
- Stats at Pro Football Reference

Lawrence Abraham Buhler (May 28, 1917 – August 21, 1990) was a fullback/halfback in the National Football League (NFL) who played 21 games for the Green Bay Packers. He played for the University of Minnesota Golden Gophers under Bernie Bierman. In 1939, the Green Bay Packers used the ninth pick in the first round of the 1939 NFL draft to sign Buhler out of the University of Minnesota. Buhler played for three seasons with the Packers and retired in 1941. Buhler ended his working career as the manager of the municipal liquor store in Windom, Minnesota. He worked as assistant manager and manager for 16 years and 8 months before retiring at the end of 1983. A statue of Buhler was erected on the grounds of the Cottonwood County Courthouse and was dedicated in 1993.
