= Charles Schultz (American football) =

American football player (1915–1989)

No. 60
- Position: Offensive tackle

Personal information
- Born: October 8, 1915; St. Paul, Minnesota, U.S.
- Died: March 15, 1989 (aged 73); Pebble Beach, California, U.S.
- Listed height: 6 ft 3 in (1.91 m)
- Listed weight: 231 lb (105 kg)

Career information
- High school: Johnson (St. Paul)
- College: Minnesota (1934-1938)
- NFL draft: 1939: 20th round, 189th overall pick

Career history
- Green Bay Packers (1939–1941)

Awards and highlights
- NFL champion (1939); Pro Bowl (1939); National champion (1936); Second-team All-Big Ten (1936)

Career NFL statistics
- Games played: 21
- Games started: 8
- Stats at Pro Football Reference

Charles William Schultz (October 8, 1915 – March 15, 1989) was an American professional football offensive tackle in the National Football League (NFL) who played for the Green Bay Packers. Schultz played collegiate ball for the University of Minnesota before being drafted by the Packers in the 20th round of the 1939 NFL draft. He played professionally for 3 seasons from 1939 to 1941.
