= Jack Morlock =

American football player (1916–1976)

No. 21
- Position: Halfback

Personal information
- Born: April 7, 1916; McKeesport, Pennsylvania, U.S.
- Died: January 7, 1976 (aged 59); Huntington, West Virginia, U.S.
- Listed height: 5 ft 10 in (1.78 m)
- Listed weight: 165 lb (75 kg)

Career information
- High school: Moundsville (Glen Dale, West Virginia)
- College: Marshall
- NFL draft: 1940: 14th round, 126th overall pick

Career history
- Detroit Lions (1940)

Career NFL statistics
- Games played: 4
- Stats at Pro Football Reference

John Morlock (April 7, 1916 – January 7, 1976) was an American professional football player.

A native of McKeesport, Pennsylvania, Morlock attended Moundsville High School in West Virginia and then played college football and basketball at Marshall University. He was selected by the United Press as a first-team forward on the 1939 All-Buckeye Conference football team.

He was selected by the Detroit Lions with the 126th pick in the 1940 NFL draft. He appeared in four games as a halfback for the Lions during the 1940 season.
