= Len Janiak =

American football player (1915–1980)

No. 3, 38, 37
- Position: Back

Personal information
- Born: October 29, 1915; Cleveland, Ohio, US
- Died: May 22, 1980 (aged 64); Cleveland, Ohio, US
- Listed height: 6 ft 1 in (1.85 m)
- Listed weight: 203 lb (92 kg)

Career information
- High school: South (Cleveland)
- College: Ohio (1935-1938)
- NFL draft: 1939: 6th round, 45th overall pick

Career history
- Brooklyn Dodgers (1939); Cleveland Rams (1940–1942)

Career NFL statistics
- Rushing yards: 229
- Rushing average: 2.7
- Receptions: 11
- Receiving yards: 65
- Total touchdowns: 1
- Stats at Pro Football Reference

Leonard Joseph Janiak (October 29, 1915 – May 22, 1980) was an American professional football player.

== Background ==
Janiak was born in 1915 in Cleveland. He attended Cleveland's South High School. He then enrolled at Ohio University where he played at the fullback position for the football team. In 1938, he scored 71 points was selected as the first-team fullback on the All-Buckeye Conference football team.

He was offered a contract by the Brooklyn Dodgers of the National Football League (NFL) in February 1939. In the final preseason game of 1939, Janiak scored both of Brooklyn's touchdowns and kicked an extra point. He appeared in 11 games, one as a starter, as a halfback and fullback for the 1939 Dodgers. He was drafted in the sixth round of the 1939 NFL Draft.

After a disagreement with Brooklyn coach Potsy Clark, Janiak was claimed off waivers by the Cleveland Rams in September 1940. He spent three seasons with the Rams from 1940 to 1942, appearing in 31 games with the club, 10 of them as a starter. He played principally at the fullback position and was used largely as a blocking back.

In early 1943, the Rams disbanded for the duration of World War II. The Rams players were allocated among the other clubs, with Janiak assigned to Brooklyn. However, Janiak entered the military and did not return to professional football after the war.

Over the course of his four seasons in the NFL, Janiak appeared in 41 NFL games, 11 as a starter.

Janiak died in 1980 in Cleveland. He was buried at Holy Cross Cemetery in Brook Park, Ohio.
