= George Svendsen =

American football player and coach (1913–1995)

No. 43, 66
- Position: Center

Personal information
- Born: March 22, 1913; Minneapolis, Minnesota, U.S.
- Died: August 6, 1995 (aged 82); Minneapolis, Minnesota, U.S.
- Listed height: 6 ft 4 in (1.93 m)
- Listed weight: 230 lb (104 kg)

Career information
- College: Minnesota

Career history

Playing
- Green Bay Packers (1935–1937, 1940–1941)

Coaching
- Antigo HS WI (1938–1939) (head coach); Minnesota (1946–1953) (assistant)

Awards and highlights
- NFL champion (1936); NFL 1930s All-Decade Team; Green Bay Packers Hall of Fame; National champion (1934); Second-team All-Big Ten (1936)

Career statistics
- Games played: 52
- Starts: 31
- Stats at Pro Football Reference

George Peter Svendsen (March 22, 1913 – August 6, 1995) was an American football player. After his college career at Oregon State and the University of Minnesota, he starred for the Green Bay Packers. He also played one season for the Oshkosh All-Stars of the National Basketball League (NBL).

Svendsen played in 52 NFL games, starting in 31 of them. He played in both playoff games for the Packers in 1936 and 1941. He had one career reception, for 11 yards in 1937. He was named to the 2nd Team All-Pro by Collyers Eye Magazine, the NFL, and UPI. Svendsen is one of ten players that were named to the National Football League 1930s All-Decade Team that have not been inducted into the Pro Football Hall of Fame. He was inducted into the Green Bay Packers Hall of Fame in 1972.

== Career statistics ==
Legend
GP	Games played	FGM	Field goals made
FTM	Free throws made	FTA	Free throws attempted
FT%	Free throw percentage	PTS	Total points
PPG	Points per game	**Bold**	Career high

=== NBL ===
==== Regular season ====
Year	Team	GP	FGM	FTM	PTS	PPG
1937–38	Oshkosh	11	18	9	45	4.1

==== Playoffs ====
Year	Team	GP	FGM	FTM	PTS	PPG
1938	Oshkosh	1	0	0	0	.0
