= Steve Reid (American football) =

American football player (1914–2009)

Profile
- Position: G

Personal information
- Born: December 16, 1914; Chicago, Illinois, U.S.
- Died: October 31, 2009 (aged 94); Des Plaines, Illinois, U.S.

Career information
- College: Northwestern University
- NFL draft: 1937: 8th round, 73rd overall pick

Awards and highlights
- Consensus All-American (1936); First-team All-Big Ten (1936)
- College Football Hall of Fame

Stephen Emmett Reid Sr. (December 16, 1914 – October 31, 2009) was an American football player. He was selected in the eighth round of the 1937 NFL draft. He was elected to the College Football Hall of Fame in 1985.
