= Cal Thomas (American football) =

American football player (1915–1982)

Profile
- Position: Guard

Personal information
- Born: July 1, 1915; Waldron, Arkansas
- Died: April 14, 1982 (aged 66); Harper Woods, Michigan
- Listed height: 6 ft 2 in (1.88 m)
- Listed weight: 210 lb (95 kg)

Career information
- High school: Pawhuska (OK)
- College: Tulsa

Career history
- Detroit Lions (1939–1940)

Career statistics
- Games: 13
- Stats at Pro Football Reference

Calvin O. Thomas (July 1, 1915 – April 14, 1982) was an American football player.

A native of Waldron, Arkansas, Thomas attended Pawhuska High School in Oklahoma and then played college football at the University of Tulsa.

He also played professional football in the National Football League (NFL) as a guard for the Detroit Lions. He appeared in 13 games for the Lions during the 1939 and 1940 seasons.
