= Clem Crabtree =

American football player and military officer (1918–1981)

Profile
- Positions: Tackle, guard

Personal information
- Born: November 11, 1918; Durham, North Carolina, U.S.
- Died: January 12, 1981 (aged 62); Myrtle Beach, South Carolina, U.S.
- Listed height: 6 ft 3 in (1.91 m)
- Listed weight: 225 lb (102 kg)

Career information
- College: Wake Forest

Career history
- Detroit Lions (1940–1941)

Career statistics
- Games: 18
- Stats at Pro Football Reference

Clem Gurley Crabtree (November 11, 1918 – January 12, 1981) was an American football player and military officer. He played college football for Wake Forest, professional football for the Detroit Lions, and military service football for the 1942 Army West Coast All-Stars and the undefeated 1944 Randolph Field Ramblers football team.

== College and pro football ==
A native of Durham, North Carolina, Crabtree played college football for Wake Forest and professional football in the National Football League (NFL) for the Detroit Lions. He appeared in 18 games, three as a starter, during the 1940 and 1941 seasons. He played at the tackle and guard positions.

== Military service ==
After the attack on Pearl Harbor, Crabtree entered the U.S. Army. He played for 1942 Army West Coast All-Stars and for the undefeated 1944 Randolph Field Ramblers football team that won the national service championship.

After the war, he continued military service with the U.S. Air Force. He served as tactical officer at the Officer Candidate Schools in Miami Beach, Florida, and San Antonio, Texas. He retired from the Air Force in July 1962.

== Family and later years ==
Crabtree was married in 1941 to Paula Edith Powell. They had two children: Andrea, born approximately 1945; and Christopher, born approximately 1950. He died in 1981 in Myrtle Beach, South Carolina. He was buried at the Wilmington National Cemetery in Wilmington, North Carolina.
