= Franny Murray =

American football player (1915–1998)

- Murray in 1940

No. 11
- Positions: Halfback, punter, placekicker

Personal information
- Born: July 21, 1915; Glenolden, Pennsylvania, U.S.
- Died: June 28, 1998 (aged 82); Boca Raton, Florida, U.S.
- Listed height: 6 ft 0 in (1.83 m)
- Listed weight: 200 lb (91 kg)

Career information
- High school: St. Joseph's Prep (Philadelphia, Pennsylvania)
- College: Penn
- NFL draft: 1937: 2nd round, 11th overall pick

Career history

Playing
- Philadelphia Eagles (1939–1940)

Operations
- Penn (1950–1953) (Athletic director)

Awards and highlights
- Second-team All-American (1936); First-team All-Eastern (1936)

Career NFL statistics
- Rushing yards: 144
- Rushing average: 2.5
- Receptions: 25
- Receiving yards: 269
- Total touchdowns: 2
- Punts: 63
- Punting yards: 2,318
- Interceptions: 2
- Stats at Pro Football Reference

Francis Thomas Murray (July 21, 1915 – June 28, 1998) was an American professional football player and college athletics administrator. He played professionally as a halfback and punter in the National Football League (NFL) for the Philadelphia Eagles from 1939 to 1940. Murray played college football at the University of Pennsylvania and was drafted in the second round of the 1937 NFL draft. He served as the athletic director at his alma mater, Penn, from 1950 to 1953.

Murray died on June 28, 1998, at his home in Boca Raton, Florida, from complications of a stroke he had suffered four years prior.
