= Glenn Olson =

American football player (1916–1982)

Profile
- Position: Blocking back

Personal information
- Born: March 31, 1916; Colo, Iowa, U.S.
- Died: November 1982 (age 66)
- Listed height: 6 ft 0 in (1.83 m)
- Listed weight: 195 lb (88 kg)

Career information
- High school: Colo (IA)
- College: Iowa

Career history
- Cleveland Rams (1940)
- Stats at Pro Football Reference

Glenn Earl "Red" Olson (March 31, 1916 – November 1982) was an American football blocking back.

Olson was born at Colo, Iowa, in 1916. He played college football as a fullback and blocking halfback for Iowa from 1935 to 1938.

In October 1940, Olson signed with the Cleveland Rams of the National Football League (NFL). He appeared in two NFL games with the Rams. He sustained a knee injury and underwent surgery after the season.

Olson also played for the Columbus Bullies of the American Football League in 1941 and for the Hollywood Bears of the Pacific Coast Professional Football League in 1942.

During World War II, he served in the United States Navy. He later returned to Colo where he worked at the family tire and service station. He died in 1982 at age 66.
