= Bill Kurlish =

American football player and engineer (1913–2000)

Profile
- Position: Back

Personal information
- Born: August 15, 1913; Philadelphia, Pennsylvania, U.S.
- Died: March 24, 2000; Springfield, Pennsylvania, U.S.

Career information
- High school: Ridley Park, PA
- College: Pennsylvania
- NFL draft: 1937: 4th round, 33rd overall pick

Awards and highlights
- Third-team All-American (1936); Second-team All-Eastern (1936)

William Kurlish (August 15, 1913 – March 24, 2000) is an American former college football player for the Penn Quakers. He was selected by the Brooklyn Dodgers in the fourth round of the 1937 NFL draft with the 33rd overall pick.

== Early life ==
Kurlish moved to Delaware County as a teenager and attended Ridley High School. At Ridley, he was a member of the track and football teams.

== College career ==
Kurlish earned a scholarship to the University of Pennsylvania and completed a bachelor's degree in electrical engineering.

== Personal life ==
Kurlish worked as an engineer with General Electric. He had one daughter, three brothers, five sisters, and one granddaughter. Golf was one of his hobbies.
