= Johnny Kovatch =

American football player (1912–2013)

No. 16
- Position: End

Personal information
- Born: June 6, 1912; South Bend, Indiana, U.S.
- Died: October 11, 2013 (aged 101); Santa Barbara, California, U.S.
- Listed height: 5 ft 11 in (1.80 m)
- Listed weight: 172 lb (78 kg)

Career information
- High school: Central (South Bend)
- College: Northwestern (1934-1937)
- NFL draft: 1938: 7th round, 57th overall pick

Career history

Playing
- Cleveland Rams (1938)

Coaching
- Owosso HS (MI) (1939) Assistant coach; Saginaw HS (MI) (1940) Assistant coach; Illinois Wesleyan (1941) Line coach; Indiana (1942–1946) Ends coach; Northwestern (1947–1954) Ends coach; Nebraska (1955) Ends coach; Kansas (1956) Assistant coach

Operations
- Illinois Wesleyan (1942) Athletic director

Awards and highlights
- Second-team All-American (1936); First-team All-Big Ten (1936)

Career NFL statistics
- Receptions: 8
- Receiving yards: 97
- Touchdowns: 1
- Stats at Pro Football Reference

John Paul Kovatch (June 6, 1912 – October 11, 2013) was an American professional football player and coach. He played professionally for six games as an end for the Cleveland Rams of the National Football League (NFL) during their 1938 season. He was selected 57th overall by the Green Bay Packers in the seventh round of the 1938 NFL draft. His tenure with the Rams ended in October 1938, when he fractured his backbone and was injured for the remainder of the season.

Kovatch was born in South Bend, Indiana and played football at Central High School. Prior to his professional career he was an end on the Northwestern Wildcats football team from 1935 through 1937. In 1936 he was selected as a second-team All-American.

Kovatch began his coaching career in 1939 when he was hired as an assistant football coach at Owosso High School in Owosso, Michigan. He resigned from his post at Owosso the next year and returned to Northwestern in the summer of 1940 to complete work towards a master's degree. That fall, he went to Saginaw High School in Saginaw, Michigan to teach biology and served as an assistant football coach.

In 1941, Kovatch was hired as the line coach for the football team at Illinois Wesleyan University to assist his former teammate at Northwestern, Don Heap, who was the school's head football coach. He succeeded Bob Voigts. Kovatch also coached track and baseball at Illinois Wesleyan. In January 1942, he succeeded Heap, who joined United States Navy Reserve, as head football coach and athletic director. In April of that year, however, Kovatch left Illinois Wesleyan to become ends coach at Indiana University, assisting head football coach Bo McMillin. In April 1944, he was called to serve in the United States Army during World War II.

Kovatch stayed at Indiana until March 1947, when he joined the coaching staff of his alma mater, Northwestern University. He remained there until February 1955 and was hired as an end coach at the University of Nebraska the following month. Less than a year later, in January 1956, he joined the staff at the University of Kansas.

== Personal life and death ==
Kovatch married Rowena La Vergne Loop, on August 19, 1939, at Central Methodist Church in Superior, Wisconsin. He died on October 11, 2013.
