= Russ Winnie =

American sports commentator (1906–1956)

- Born: August 17, 1906; Racine, Wisconsin, U.S.
- Died: March 30, 1956 (aged 49); Fort Lauderdale, Florida, U.S.
- Occupation: Sports commentator
- Years active: 1929–1946
- Awards: Green Bay Packers Hall of Fame (2016)
- Sports commentary career
- Teams: Green Bay Packers; Wisconsin Badgers; Milwaukee Brewers
- Genre: Play-by-play
- Sports: NFL football; College football; College basketball; Minor league baseball
- Employer: WTMJ

Russell Griffith Winnie (August 17, 1906 – March 30, 1956) was an American sports commentator. A pioneer in his field, he was the first broadcaster for the Green Bay Packers of the National Football League (NFL), announcing their games for WTMJ from 1929 to 1946. He also announced games for the Wisconsin Badgers football and basketball teams, as well as for the minor league Milwaukee Brewers baseball team.

== Early life ==
Winnie was born on August 17, 1906, in Racine, Wisconsin. He was the son of Professor Alonza Winnie, a superintendent at the Wisconsin School for the Deaf. At the age of seven, his family moved to Milwaukee. He attended Riverside High School and graduated from the University of Wisconsin–Madison, being president of the university's dramatic group. Winnie initially had no interest in sports broadcasting or radio.

After graduating from the University of Wisconsin–Madison, Winnie sold real estate for a year before the market began to decline in 1928. His broadcasting career occurred by accident. He attempted to get a job in the advertising department of the Milwaukee Journal but was declined. "But on his way downstairs in an elevator he heard music coming from WTMJ studios, then located in the Journal Building," sportswriter Ray McBride said. "He applied for a job, received an audition and was hired."

== Broadcasting career ==
Winnie initially only handled routine announcing jobs before receiving an opportunity to announce games for the minor league Milwaukee Brewers baseball team in the summer of 1929. In the fall, Wadham's Oil and Grease Company, who helped broadcast WTMJ, wanted to sponsor sports, and Winnie was named their official announcer. He did play-by-play commentary for the Wisconsin Badgers football team across their 1929 season and also announced games for their basketball team.

In November 1929, Winnie served as the announcer for the first commercially broadcast game of the Green Bay Packers of the National Football League (NFL). Rather than report from the stadium's press box, he was in a studio at another location, and announced based on telegrams he received from Milwaukee Journal reporter Pat Gannon, who was at the game. The Packers won the game, 20–6, and went on to win their first league championship that season.

Winnie went on to serve as the Packers' play-by-play radio announcer for 18 years, retiring after the 1946 season. He was their announcer as they won their first six championships in franchise history, all under head coach Curly Lambeau. During his tenure with the team, Winnie became highly popular among fans, being known for his "dramatic style and extensive vocabulary." Green Bay Packers historian Cliff Christl said of him: "One of pro football's pioneer announcers, Winnie was the voice of the Packers when their games were first broadcast on radio and helped build the team's vast statewide fan base. Thanks to his untamed exuberance and dramatic flair, Winnie turned many of his listeners into fiercely loyal, lifelong Packers fans. Although this was before anyone could watch the games on television, Winnie's captivating play-by-plays painted images almost vivid enough to seem real."

Winnie had such popularity with fans that he would often receive extended ovations when introduced at events, similar to what would happen when Packers players were introduced. In a 1934 poll held by a Milwaukee newspaper, Winnie was voted the "most popular sports announcer." At a banquet following the Packers' 1936 championship, he re-enacted one of his touchdown calls, and a Green Bay Press-Gazette reporter noted afterwards that "the crowd rocked with pleasure." While announcing was usually a one-man task in his era, he was assisted by his wife Evelyn in the broadcast booth for the last 14 years of his career, even though women were not allowed in the press box at the time.

Winnie often said that his favorite game to call was the Packers' 17–14 comeback win over the Chicago Bears in 1935. He retired from announcing in December 1946, after having been the voice of the Packers for 18 seasons, the announcer for the Wisconsin Badgers football and basketball teams for 16 years and the Milwaukee Brewers for six years. He had also run a daily-except-Sunday sports talk show named "Sports Flash" for 18 years. He totaled between 7,000 and 8,000 sports broadcasts in his career.

At Winnie's retirement, Packers president W. Webber Kelly said "I would like to testify to the great value your broadcasts of the Packer games were in stimulating interest and building up attendance during those early trying days. Your contribution to our success in your personal interest and encouragement of the individual players must never be forgotten." Additionally, sportswriter Ray McBride wrote that "When it is considered that commercial broadcasting is only 26 years old, Winnie's 18-year career is phenomenal. No announcer in radio history has rolled up a record of sports broadcasting to match Winnie's. Some of them, like Ted Husing, have been in the game longer, but even Husing calls Winnie, 'The man who has broadcast more sports events than any other man in America.'" After retiring from announcing, Winnie worked in an administrative role at WTMJ until his death. He became manager for the radio station in 1946 and was also the assistant manager for the television station starting in 1953.

== Personal life and death ==
Winnie had two children with his wife Evelyn. He died while on vacation in Fort Lauderdale, Florida, on March 30, 1956, at the age of 49. He had dealt with heart problems prior to his death. 70 years after his retirement from broadcasting, Winnie was posthumously inducted into the Green Bay Packers Hall of Fame in 2016.
