= Hank Rockwell =

American football player (1917–1997)

Profile
- Position: Guard

Personal information
- Born: February 10, 1917; Whittier, California
- Died: November 30, 1997 (aged 80); Okaloosa County, Florida
- Listed height: 6 ft 4 in (1.93 m)
- Listed weight: 231 lb (105 kg)

Career information
- High school: Puente Union (CA)
- College: Arizona State

Career history
- Cleveland Rams (1941–1942)

Career statistics
- Games: 55
- Games started: 11
- Interceptions: 5
- Stats at Pro Football Reference

Henry Albert Rockwell (February 10, 1917 – November 30, 1997) was an American football player. He played college football for Arizona State University and professional football in the National Football League (NFL) as a guard for the Cleveland Rams (1940–1942). He appeared in 55 NFL and AAFC games, 11 as a starter.
