= Sam Tsoutsouvas (American football) =

American football player (1917–1989)

Profile
- Positions: Center, linebacker

Personal information
- Born: October 8, 1917; Madera, California
- Died: March 27, 1989 (aged 71); Santa Barbara, California
- Listed height: 6 ft 0 in (1.83 m)
- Listed weight: 205 lb (93 kg)

Career information
- High school: Santa Barbara (CA)
- College: Oregon State

Career history
- Detroit Lions (1940); Seattle Shipbuilders (1942); Seattle Bombers (1944); Tacoma Indians (1946)

Career statistics
- Games: 3
- Stats at Pro Football Reference

John Samuel "Chooch" Tsoutsouvas (October 8, 1917 – March 27, 1989) was an American football player.

Tsoutsouvas was born in 1917 at Madera, California. He attended Santa Barbara High School and then Ventura College. He then played college football at Oregon State University in 1938 and 1939.

He then played professional football in the National Football League (NFL) as a center and linebacker for the Detroit Lions. He appeared in three games for the Lions during the 1940 season.

He also played for the Seattle Shipbuilders of the NWIFL in 1940, the Seattle Bombers of the American Football League in 1944, and the Tacoma Indians of the Pacific Coast Football League in 1946.

Tsoutsouvas died in 1989 at Santa Barbara, California.
