= Andy Uram =

American football player (1915–1984)

No. 8, 42
- Position: Halfback

Personal information
- Born: March 21, 1915; Minneapolis, Minnesota, U.S.
- Died: December 9, 1984 (aged 69); Green Bay, Wisconsin, U.S.
- Listed height: 5 ft 10 in (1.78 m)
- Listed weight: 188 lb (85 kg)

Career information
- College: Minnesota (1934-1937)
- NFL draft: 1938: 6th round, 47th overall pick

Career history
- Green Bay Packers (1938–1943)

Awards and highlights
- NFL champion (1939); Pro Bowl (1939); Green Bay Packers Hall of Fame; 2× National champion (1935, 1936); First-team All-American (1936); First-team All-Big Ten (1936)

Career NFL statistics
- Rushing yards: 1,073
- Rushing average: 4.5
- Receptions: 58
- Receiving yards: 1,083
- Total touchdowns: 16
- Stats at Pro Football Reference

Andrew Uram Jr. (March 21, 1915 – December 9, 1984) was an American professional football running back and defensive back in the National Football League (NFL) who played for the Green Bay Packers. Uram played collegiate ball for the University of Minnesota before being drafted by the Packers in the sixth round of the 1938 NFL draft with the 47th overall pick. He played professionally for six seasons from 1938 to 1943. In 1939, he was the first player to run for a touchdown of over 90 yards, doing so with a 97-yard touchdown run.

After the 1943 NFL season, Uram served in the United States Navy during World War II. In 1973, Uram was inducted into the Green Bay Packers Hall of Fame. He died in 1984, at the age of 69.
