= Kent Ryan =

American football player (1915–2006)

Profile
- Position: Halfback

Personal information
- Born: February 3, 1915; Midvale, Utah, U.S.
- Died: February 2, 2006 (aged 90)

Career information
- College: Utah State

Career history
- Detroit Lions (1938–1940)

Awards and highlights
- NFL interceptions co-leader (1940); First-team All-American (1936)

Career statistics
- Interceptions: 6
- Rushing yards: 263
- Punts: 12
- Punting yards: 462
- Stats at Pro Football Reference

Orson Kent Ryan (February 2, 1915 – February 3, 2006) was an American professional football player who was a defensive back for three seasons (1938, 1939, and 1940) for the Detroit Lions of the National Football League (NFL). He also served in the Army and was called in to serve in the South Pacific in 1941 for 5 years.

He, along with Don Hutson and Ace Parker, led the league in interceptions with 6 for the 1940 season, the first in which the NFL kept records.
