= Paul Moore (American football) =

American football player (1918–1975)

Profile
- Position: Halfback

Personal information
- Born: January 23, 1918; York, South Carolina, U.S.
- Died: May 3, 1975 (aged 56); Martin County, Florida, U.S.
- Listed height: 5 ft 9 in (1.75 m)
- Listed weight: 208 lb (94 kg)

Career information
- High school: York (SC)
- College: Presbyterian

Career history
- Detroit Lions (1940–1941)

Career statistics
- Games played: 15
- Stats at Pro Football Reference

Paul Neely "June" Moore (January 23, 1918 – May 3, 1975) was an American football player. He played college football as a halfback for the Presbyterian Blue Hose from 1936 to 1939 and professional football for the Detroit Lions in 1940 and 1941.

== Early life ==
Moore was born in 1918 in York, South Carolina. He attended York High School and Presbyterian College, both in South Carolina. He played college football as a blocking halfback for the Presbyterian Blue Hose football team from 1936 to 1939.

== Professional athlete ==
Presbyterian coach Walter A. Johnson recommended that Detroit Lions coach Potsy Clark sign Moore. Clark invited Moore for a tryout, and Moore impressed. He played for two seasons as a blocking back and linebacker for the Lions. He appeared in 14 or 15 games during the 1940 and 1941 seasons.

Moore also played minor league baseball. In January 1942, Moore enlisted in the United States Navy following the attack on Pearl Harbor. He was medically discharged from the Navy in 1943 and returned to the Lions in August 1943. He did not return to the team's regular season lineup.

== Family and later years ==
Moore was married in March 1942 to Sally Virginia Gentel. Teammate Chuck Hanneman was his best man.

Moore lived in later years at Okeechobee, Florida. He was a counselor at the Dunklin Memorial Camp there. He died there in 1975 at age 57 of an apparent heart attack.
