= Charley Hamrick =

American football player (1912–1963)

Charles Edward Hamrick (September 15, 1912 – February 23, 1963) was the 17th pick in the 1937 NFL draft. He was drafted in the second round by the Detroit Lions. He went to college at Ohio State University. He was the 3rd Buckeye to be drafted to the NFL.
