= Fred Vanzo =

American football player (1916–1976)

No. 22, 73
- Position: Back

Personal information
- Born: January 8, 1916; Universal, Indiana, U.S.
- Died: February 7, 1976 (aged 60); Plymouth, Minnesota, U.S.
- Listed height: 6 ft 2 in (1.88 m)
- Listed weight: 230 lb (104 kg)

Career information
- High school: Clinton (Clinton, Indiana)
- College: Northwestern (1934-1937)
- NFL draft: 1938: 3rd round, 23rd overall pick

Career history
- Detroit Lions (1938–1941); Chicago Cardinals (1941)

Awards and highlights
- First-team All-Pro (1940); Pro Bowl (1939); First-team All-Big Ten (1936); Second-team All-Big Ten (1937)

Career NFL statistics
- Receptions: 17
- Receiving yards: 257
- Rushing yards: 45
- Stats at Pro Football Reference

Frederick Ferdinand Vanzo (January 8, 1916 – February 1976) was an American professional football player who was a running back for four seasons for the Detroit Lions and Chicago Cardinals. He was selected in the third round of the 1938 NFL draft with the 23rd overall pick.
