= Frank Balazs =

American football player (1918–1962)

No. 35, 44, 26
- Positions: Fullback, Linebacker, Defensive back

Personal information
- Born: January 23, 1918; Chicago, Illinois, U.S.
- Died: July 7, 1962 (aged 44); Chicago, Illinois, U.S.
- Listed height: 6 ft 2 in (1.88 m)
- Listed weight: 212 lb (96 kg)

Career information
- High school: Lane Tech (Chicago)
- College: Iowa (1935-1938)
- NFL draft: 1939: 18th round, 169th overall pick

Career history
- Green Bay Packers (1939–1941); Chicago Cardinals (1941, 1945)

Awards and highlights
- NFL champion (1939); Pro Bowl (1939)

Career NFL statistics
- Rushing yards: 228
- Rushing average: 3.8
- Receptions: 5
- Receiving yards: 50
- Total touchdowns: 1
- Stats at Pro Football Reference

Frank Steve Balazs (January 23, 1918 – July 7, 1962) was an American professional football player who played professionally for the Green Bay Packers and the Chicago Cardinals of the National Football League (NFL) from 1939 to 1945. He was selected in the 18th round of the 1939 NFL draft. A member of the 1939 NFL Champion Packers, Balas played in the annual All-Star Game that year. He played College football at the University of Iowa.
