= 1938 Big Ten Conference football season =

- Sport: Football
- Teams: 10
- Top draft pick: Larry Buhler
- Champion: Minnesota
- Season MVP: Howard Weiss

Football seasons
- 1937 1939

1938 Big Ten Conference football standings
	Conf.					Overall
Team	W		L		T	W		L		T
No. 10 Minnesota $	4	–	1	–	0	6	–	2	–	0
No. 16 Michigan	3	–	1	–	1	6	–	1	–	1
Purdue	3	–	1	–	1	5	–	1	–	2
No. 17 Northwestern	2	–	1	–	2	4	–	2	–	2
Wisconsin	3	–	2	–	0	5	–	3	–	0
Ohio State	3	–	2	–	1	4	–	3	–	1
Illinois	2	–	3	–	0	3	–	5	–	0
Iowa	1	–	3	–	1	1	–	6	–	1
Indiana	1	–	4	–	0	1	–	6	–	1
Chicago	0	–	4	–	0	1	–	6	–	1
$ – Conference champion; Rankings from AP Poll

The 1938 Big Ten Conference football season was the 43rd season of college football played by the member schools of the Big Ten Conference (also known as the Western Conference) and was a part of the 1938 college football season.

The Big Ten Conference championship went to Bernie Bierman's 1938 Minnesota Golden Gophers football team. Minnesota compiled a 6–2 record, outscored its opponents 97 to 38, and was ranked No. 10 in the final AP Poll. Guard Frank Twedell was a first-team All-American. Twedell and quarterback Wilbur Moore were first-team picks for the All-Big Ten team.

Michigan, in its first year under head coach Fritz Crisler, compiled a 6–1–1 record, outscored opponents 131 to 40, led the conference in scoring offense (16.4 points per game), and was ranked No. 16 in the final AP Poll. The team's only setbacks were a 7-6 loss to Minnesota and a scoreless tie with Northwestern. Michigan guard Ralph Heikkinen was a consensus first-team All-American. Sophomore backs Tom Harmon and Forest Evashevski were both first-team All-Big Ten players.

Northwestern, under head coach Pappy Waldorf, compiled a 4–2–2 record, outscored opponents 93 to 32, led the conference in scoring defense (4.0 points per game), and was ranked No. 17 in the final AP Poll. Tackle Bob Voigts was a first-team All-American.

Wisconsin fullback Howard Weiss received the Chicago Tribune Silver Football trophy as the most valuable player in the conference. Ralph Heikkinen finished in second place in the voting and Larry Buhler of Minnesota was third.

== Season overview ==
=== Results and team statistics ===
Conf. Rank	Team	Head coach	AP final	AP high	Overall record	Conf. record	PPG	PAG	MVP
1	Minnesota	Bernie Bierman	#10	#2	6-2	4-1	12.1	4.8	Larry Buhler
2 (tie)	Michigan	Fritz Crisler	#16	#11	6–1–1	3–1–1	16.4	5.0	Ralph Heikkinen
2 (tie)	Purdue	Mal Elward	NR	NR	5–1–2	3–1–1	10.5	4.8	Joe Mihal
4	Northwestern	Pappy Waldorf	#17	#7	4–2–2	2–1–2	11.6	4.0	Bob Voigts
5	Wisconsin	Harry Stuhldreher	NR	#12	5–3	3–2	13.9	11.6	Howard Weiss
6	Ohio State	Francis Schmidt	NR	#20	4–3–1	3–2–1	14.9	8.1	Jim Langhurst
7	Illinois	Robert Zuppke	NR	NR	3–5	2–3	13.8	11.0	James Hodges
8	Iowa	Irl Tubbs	NR	NR	1–6–1	1–3–1	5.8	16.9	Erwin Prasse
9	Indiana	Bo McMillin	NR	NR	1–6–1	1–4	2.6	8.4	Bob Haak
10	Chicago	Clark Shaughnessy	NR	NR	1–6–1	0–4	9.4	30.1	Lew Hamity

Key
PPG = Average of points scored per game
PAG = Average of points allowed per game
MVP = Most valuable player as voted by players on each team as part of the voting process to determine the winner of the Chicago Tribune Silver Football trophy

=== Regular season ===
==== September 23–24 ====
On September 23 and 24, 1938, the Big Ten began play with four non-conference games, resulting in two wins and two losses.

- UCLA 27, Iowa 3. The season began on Friday, September 23, 1938, with Iowa facing UCLA before a crowd of 40,000 at the Los Angeles Memorial Coliseum. UCLA won by a 27 to 3 score. The game was billed as a duel between All-American candidates Kenny Washington of UCLA and Nile Kinnick of Iowa, but both had subpar performances. Washington gained 60 net yards, while Kinnick had only 35 net yards.
- Minnesota 15, Washington 0. On Saturday, September 24, Minnesota defeated Washington, 15-0, in front of a crowd of 50,000 spectators at Memorial Stadium in Minneapolis. Several rest periods were called due to heat. Minnesota stopped Washington's highly touted passing attack, intercepting five of the 16 passes thrown by Washington's Jimmy Johnston and Dean McAdams. Defensive guard Bob Johnson returned an interception 77 yards for a touchdown.
- Purdue 19, Detroit 6. Purdue defeated Gus Dorais' Detroit Titans, 19-6, before a crowd of more than 24,000 spectators at Ross–Ade Stadium in Lafayette, Indiana. On a hot day, the teams played to a scoreless tie in the first half. Detroit took a 6 to 0 lead in the third quarter, but Purdue then rallied to 19 unanswered points. Brown, Krause and Byelene scored touchdowns for Purdue.
- Ohio 6, Illinois 0. Illinois defeated Ohio, 6-0, at Memorial Stadium in Champaign, Illinois. Illinois out-gained Ohio, 205 yards to 59, but suffered from turnovers. After an Illinois fumble, Ohio halfback Jim Snyder scored the game's only points on a pass from Monk Montgomery.

==== October 1 ====
On October 1, 1938, the Big Ten football teams played one conference game and seven non-conference games. The non-conference games resulted in six wins and a tie. Iowa had a bye.

- Minnesota 16, Nebraska 7. Minnesota defeated Nebraska, 16-7, before a crowd of 46,000 at Memorial Stadium in Minneapolis.
- Michigan 14, Michigan State 0. In its first game under new head coach Fritz Crisler, Michigan defeated Michigan State, 14-0, before a crowd of 73,589 spectators at Michigan Stadium in Ann Arbor, Michigan. Sophomore halfback Paul Kromer, appearing in his first game for Michigan, scored both touchdowns.
- Northwestern 21, Kansas State 0. Northwestern defeated Kansas State, 21-0, before a crowd of 35,000 spectators at Dyche Stadium in Evanston, Illinois. All three Northwestern touchdowns came on passes. Jack Ryan completed touchdown passes to George McGurn and Bernie Jefferson, and Paul Soper threw the third touchdown pass to Bob Daly.
- Purdue 21, Butler 6.
- Wisconsin 27, Marquette 0.
- Ohio State 6, Indiana 0.
- Illinois 44, DePaul 7.
- Chicago 0, Bradley 0.

==== October 8 ====
On October 8, 1938, the Big Ten football teams played four conference games and two non-conference games. The non-conference games resulted in one win and one loss.

- Minnesota 7, Purdue 0. Minnesota defeated Purdue, 7-0, before a crowd of 52,000 spectators at Memorial Stadium in Minneapolis. Fullback Marty Christiansen scored the game's only touchdown in third quarter.
- Michigan 45, Chicago 7. Michigan defeated Chicago, 45 to 7, before a crowd of 22,976 at Michigan Stadium. Michigan's 45 points was the most for a Michigan team since 1926. Michigan touchdowns were scored by Norm Purucker (44-yard run in the first quarter), Paul Kromer (25-yard run), Ed Czak (25-yard touchdown pass from Dave Strong), Tom Harmon (59-yard run in the third quarter), Fred Trosko (five-yard run in fourth quarter), Howard Mehaffey (31-yard run in fourth quarter), and Dave Strong (14-yard run late in the game).Michigan totaled 476 rushing yards and 32 passing yards to Chicago's 133 rushing yards and 118 passing yards.
- Northwestern 33, Drake 0.
- Wisconsin 31, Iowa 13.
- USC 14, Ohio State 7.
- Illinois 12, Indiana 2.

==== October 15 ====
On October 15, 1938, the Big Ten football teams played three conference games and four non-conference teams. The non-conference games resulted in two losses and two ties.

- Minnesota 7, Michigan 6. Minnesota defeated Michigan, 7-6, at Memorial Stadium in Minneapolis. Neither team scored in the first three quarters. In the fourth quarter, Michigan drove 90 yards with Paul Kromer scoring on a short run for touchdown, and Michigan missed the extra point. Later in the quarter, Tom Harmon fumbled at midfield, and Minnesota recovered the loose ball. After Harmon's fumble, Minnesota halfback Harold Van Every threw a long pass to Bill Johnson who was downed at Michigan's 14-yard line. Minnesota's drive was capped by a 10-yard touchdown pass from Van Every to halfback Wilbur Moore. Quarterback George Faust kicked the extra point to give Minnesota a one point margin of victory. Michigan gained 157 rushing yards and 97 passing yards to outperform Minnesota's 91 rushing yards and 41 passing yards.
- Northwestern 0, Ohio State 0.
- Iowa 27, Chicago 14.
- Notre Dame 14, Illinois 6.
- Pittsburgh 26, Wisconsin 6.
- Indiana 0, Nebraska 0.
- Purdue 6, Fordham 6.

==== October 22 ====
On October 22, 1938, the Big Ten football teams played three conference games and three non-conference games. The non-conference games resulted in two losses and one win. Minnesota had a bye week.

- Michigan 15, Yale 13. Michigan defeated Yale, 15-13, at the Yale Bowl in New Haven, Connecticut. Yale led, 13-2, at halftime. In the third quarter, Michigan scored on a two-yard run by Norm Purucker. In the fourth quarter, Harmon threw a touchdown to John Nicholson.
- Northwestern 13, Illinois 0.
- Purdue 13, Wisconsin 7.
- Ohio State 42, Chicago 7.
- Colgate 14, Iowa 0.
- Kansas State 13, Indiana 6.

==== October 29 ====
On October 29, 1938, the Big Ten football teams played four conference games and two non-conference games. The non-conference games resulted in two wins.

- Northwestern 6, Minnesota 3.
- Michigan 14, Illinois 0. Michigan defeated Illinois, 14-0, before a crowd of 43,006 at Michigan Stadium. In the first quarter, Tom Harmon ran for the Wolverines' first touchdown. In the third quarter, end Danny Smick blocked an Illinois punt and recovered the ball at the Illinois 29-yard line. After short gains, Harmon "rifled" a pass to Forest Evashevski for Michigan's second touchdown.
- Purdue 0, Iowa 0.
- Wisconsin 6, Indiana 0.
- Ohio State 32, NYU 0.
- Chicago 34, DePauw 14.

==== November 5 ====
On November 5, 1938, the Big Ten football teams played three conference games and three non-conference games. The three non-conference games resulted in two losses and one win. Illinois had a bye week.

- Minnesota 28, Iowa 0.
- Michigan 19, Penn 13. Michigan defeated Penn, 19-13, before a crowd of 31,292 at Michigan Stadium. Michigan's first touchdown was scored by guard Milo Sukup after Don Siegel blocked Frank Reagan's punt and the ball bounced back into the end zone. Paul Kromer scored Michigan's remaining touchdowns, one on a 50-yard punt return and the other on a 13-yard touchdown pass from Fred Trosko. Michigan led 19 to 0 at the start of the fourth quarter. Playing against Michigan's substitutes, Penn scored two touchdowns in the final seven minutes, including a 62-yard touchdown run by Penn quarterback Johnny Dutcher.
- Wisconsin 20, Northwestern 13.
- Purdue 12, Ohio State 0.
- Harvard 47, Chicago 13.
- Boston College 14, Indiana 0.

==== November 12 ====
On November 12, 1939, the Big Ten football teams played three conference games and three non-conference games. The non-conference games resulted in two losses and a win. Purdue had a bye week.

- Notre Dame 19, Minnesota 0. Minnesota (ranked No. 12 in the AP Poll) lost to Notre Dame (ranked No. 1), 19-0, before a crowd of 56,000 at Notre Dame Stadium. An hour and a half before the game, two "football special" trains carrying fans to the game crashed in South Bend, injuring 91 persons and shaking up 950 others.
- Michigan 0, Northwestern 0. Michigan (ranked No. 18 in the AP Poll) and Northwestern played to a scoreless tie at Michigan Stadium in Ann Arbor. Northwestern had won the last three games. In the third quarter, Northwestern's Bernie Jefferson had a 51-yard run to Michigan's 11-yard line. Northwestern advanced to the one-yard line with a first-and-goal opportunity. After three unsuccessful running plays, Northwestern passed on fourth down, and the ball was intercepted in the end zone by Norm Purucker of Michigan. In the fourth quarter, Michigan advanced the ball to the Northwestern six-yard line, but a field goal attempt by Fred Trosko was unsuccessful. With one minute remaining, Purucker faked a punt and ran 44 yards to Northwestern's 25-yard line, but Michigan was unable to score.
- Wisconsin 14, UCLA 7. Wisconsin (ranked No. 15 in the AP Poll) defeated UCLA, 14-7, before a crowd of 35,000 at the Los Angeles Memorial Coliseum. UCLA out-gained Wisconsin, but the Bruins fumbled 10 times with the Badgers recovering six of them.
- Ohio State 32, Illinois 14. Ohio State defeated Illinois, 32-14, in the annual battle for the Illibuck. The game was played before a crowd of 18,000 at Memorial Stadium in Champaign, Illinois. Fullback Jim Langhurst scored three touchdowns for Ohio State.
- Indiana 7, Iowa 3. Indiana defeated Iowa, 7-3, before a crowd of approximately 10,000 at Memorial Stadium in Bloomington, Indiana. Indiana trailed 3-0 in the fourth quarter.
- Pacific 32, Chicago 0. Chicago lost to Amos Alonzo Stagg's Pacific Tigers, 32-0, before a homecoming crowd of 10,000 at Stagg Field in Chicago. Stagg had been Chicago's head coach from 1892 to 1932, and the 1938 game was Stagg's first return to the University of Chicago as an opposing coach.

==== November 19 ====
On November 19, 1938, the Big Ten football teams played four conference games and two non-conference games. Both non-conference games were losses.

- Minnesota 21, Wisconsin 0. Minnesota defeated Wisconsin (ranked No. 12 in the AP Poll) met with the Big Ten championship going to the winner of the game. Minnesota won easily, 21 to 0, before a crowd of 41,000 at Camp Randall Stadium in Madison, Wisconsin. Minnesota's touchdowns were scored by Larry Buhler (27-yard run), George Franck (13-yard run), and Marty Christiansen (short run).
- Notre Dame 9, Northwestern 7. Northwestern (ranked No. 16 in the AP Poll) lost to Notre Dame (ranked No. 1), 9-7, before a crowd of 48,500 at Dyche Stadium in Evanston, Illinois. Northwestern led, 7-6, at halftime. Second-string quarterback, Willard Clair Hofer, returned an interception 65 yards for Notre Dame's first touchdown; he then kicked a field goal in the third quarter to give Notre Dame its margin of victory. Northwestern's touchdown was scored by fullback George McGurn.
- Michigan 18, Ohio State 0. Michigan (ranked No. 17 in the AP Poll) defeated Ohio State, 18 to 0, in Columbus. Ohio State had won four consecutive shutouts over Michigan from 1934 to 1937. In the second quarter, Tom Harmon ran for a touchdown from the one-yard line, tallying Michigan's first points against Ohio State since 1933. In the fourth quarter, Harmon intercepted an Ohio State pass and then threw a 15-yard pass to Ed Frutig for Michigan's second touchdown. Fred Trosko ran 38 yards around the left end for Michigan's third touchdown. Michigan's attempts at point after touchdown failed. After the game, a brawl erupted on the field as Michigan fans attempted to tear down the goalposts at Ohio Stadium. The game's outcome was the most one-sided loss for Ohio State in five years under head coach, Francis Schmidt. The United Press opined that Michigan's victory over the Buckeyes was the "climax of the Wolverines' return as a major gridiron power."
- Purdue 13, Indiana 6. Purdue defeated Indiana, 13-6, in the annual Old Oaken Bucket rivalry game played before a crowd of 32,000 at Ross–Ade Stadium in Lafayette, Indiana.
- Nebraska 14, Iowa 0. Iowa lost to Nebraska, 19–0, at Iowa Stadium in Iowa City. Iowa passed for 220 yards but fumbled six times and was unable to score. In The Des Moines Register, Bert McGrane wrote: "Iowa tramped the last weary mile of its rocky football road here Saturday and finished the season the way it began it – in defeat."
- Illinois 34, Chicago 0. Illinois defeated Chicago, 34-0, before a crowd of 5,000 at Stagg Field in Chicago. The margin was 13-0 at the end of the third quarter, but Chicago's desperate attempts at a comeback provided openings for Illinois to score 21 points in the fourth quarter. The defeat marked the close of Chicago's second consecutive season without a victory over a Big Ten opponent.

=== Bowl games ===
No Big Ten teams participated in any bowl games during the 1938 season. On December 3, 1938, the faculty committee of the Big Ten universities rejected a proposal from the Pacific Coast Conference for the two conference's champions to compete in the Rose Bowl. The Big Ten reaffirmed its ban on postseason games and its rule that all football games must be completed on the Saturday before Thanksgiving.

== All-Big Ten players ==
The following players were picked by the Associated Press (AP) and/or the United Press (UP) as first-team players on the 1938 All-Big Ten Conference football team.

- Cleo Diehl, end, Northwestern (AP, UP)
- Erwin Prasse, end, Iowa (AP)
- Frank Petrick, end, Indiana (UP)
- Joe Mihal, tackle, Purdue (AP, UP)
- Bob Voigts, tackle, Northwestern (UP)
- Bob Haak, tackle, Indiana (AP)
- Ralph Heikkinen, guard, Michigan (AP, UP)
- Francis Twedell, guard, Minnesota (AP)
- Jack Murray center, Wisconsin (AP, UP)
- Forest Evashevski, quarterback, Michigan (AP)
- Wilbur Moore, quarterback, Minnesota (UP)
- Lou Brock, halfback, Purdue (AP, UP)
- Tom Harmon, halfback, Michigan (AP, UP)
- Howard Weiss, Wisconsin (AP, UP)

== All-Americans ==
The only Big Ten player selected as a consensus first-team player on the 1938 College Football All-America Team was:

- Ralph Heikkinen, guard, Michigan (AAB, AP, UP, CP, CO, NEA, NYS, WC, INS, LIB, NW, SN, DT, PW)

Other Big Ten players to receive first-team honors from at least one selector were:

- Bob Voigts, tackle, Northwestern (AAB, WC)
- Frank Twedell, guard, Minnesota (INS, SN, ID, PW)
- Howard Weiss, halfback, Wisconsin (ID)

== 1939 NFL draft ==
The following Big Ten players were selected in the first nine rounds of the 1939 NFL draft:

Name	Position	Team	Round	Overall pick
Larry Buhler	Back	Minnesota	1	9
Bob Haak	Tackle	Indiana	2	15
Joe Mihal	Tackle	Purdue	3	19
Howard Weiss	Fullback	Wisconsin	3	22
Lynn Hovland	Guard	Wisconsin	5	39
George Faust	Back	Minnesota	6	42
Tony Ippolito	Back	Purdue	7	54
Alex Schoenbaum	Tackle	Ohio State	7	55
Frank Twedell	Tackle	Minnesota	7	59
Wilbur Moore	Back	Minnesota	9	78
