= 1938 Michigan Wolverines football team =

American college football season

1938 Michigan Wolverines football
- Conference: Big Ten Conference

Ranking
- AP: No. 16
- Record: 6–1–1 (3–1–1 Big Ten)
- Head coach: Fritz Crisler (1st season)
- Offensive scheme: Single-wing
- MVP: Ralph Heikkinen
- Captain: Fred Janke
- Home stadium: Michigan Stadium

1938 Big Ten Conference football standings
	Conf.					Overall
Team	W		L		T	W		L		T
No. 10 Minnesota $	4	–	1	–	0	6	–	2	–	0
No. 16 Michigan	3	–	1	–	1	6	–	1	–	1
Purdue	3	–	1	–	1	5	–	1	–	2
No. 17 Northwestern	2	–	1	–	2	4	–	2	–	2
Wisconsin	3	–	2	–	0	5	–	3	–	0
Ohio State	3	–	2	–	1	4	–	3	–	1
Illinois	2	–	3	–	0	3	–	5	–	0
Iowa	1	–	3	–	1	1	–	6	–	1
Indiana	1	–	4	–	0	1	–	6	–	1
Chicago	0	–	4	–	0	1	–	6	–	1
$ – Conference champion; Rankings from AP Poll

The 1938 Michigan Wolverines football team represented the University of Michigan in the 1938 Big Ten Conference football season. After the firing of Harry Kipke in December 1937, Fritz Crisler took over as Michigan's head coach in February 1938. In the first year of the Crisler era, the Wolverines compiled a 6–1–1 record and outscored opponents 131 to 40, allowing an average of only five points per game. The team's only setbacks were a 7-6 loss to Minnesota and a scoreless tie with Northwestern. The Wolverines finished the season ranked No. 16 in the final AP Poll. In the post-season rankings compiled by Frank Dickinson, the University of Illinois professor who developed the Dickinson System, Michigan ranked sixth in the country.

Michigan's senior guard Ralph Heikkinen was a unanimous All-American in 1938. He also won Michigan's Most Valuable Player award and finished second to Howard Weiss in close voting for both the Chicago Tribune Silver Football trophy as the most valuable player in the Big Ten Conference.

Three Wolverines, Ralph Heikkinen, halfback Tom Harmon and quarterback Forest Evashevski, were selected as first-team players on the 1938 All-Big Ten Conference football team. Senior tackle Fred Janke was the captain of the 1938 Michigan team.

== Schedule ==
Date	Opponent	Rank	Site	Result	Attendance
October 1	Michigan State*		Michigan Stadium; Ann Arbor, MI (rivalry)	W 14–0	73,589
October 8	Chicago		Michigan Stadium; Ann Arbor, MI (rivalry)	W 45–7	22,976
October 15	at Minnesota		Memorial Stadium; Minneapolis, MN (Little Brown Jug)	L 6–7	54,212
October 22	at Yale*	No. 12	Yale Bowl; New Haven, CT	W 15–13	29,261
October 29	Illinois^{†}	No. 13	Michigan Stadium; Ann Arbor, MI (rivalry)	W 14–0	43,006
November 5	Penn*	No. 16	Michigan Stadium; Ann Arbor, MI	W 19–13	31,292
November 12	Northwestern	No. 18	Michigan Stadium; Ann Arbor, MI (rivalry)	T 0–0	71,010
November 19	at Ohio State	No. 17	Ohio Stadium; Columbus, OH (rivalry)	W 18–0	64,413
*Non-conference game; ^{†}Homecoming; Rankings from AP Poll released prior to the game

== Season summary ==
=== Coaching change ===
Harry Kipke was fired as Michigan's head coach on December 9, 1937. By mid-January 1938, attention focused on Princeton head coach Fritz Crisler as a likely replacement for Kipke. On February 9, 1938, Crisler announced his resignation at Princeton in order to assume the head coaching position at Michigan. Crisler had played at the end position for Amos Alonzo Stagg at the University of Chicago and had thereafter served for eight years as an assistant coach under Stagg and later as a head coach at the University of Minnesota (1930–1931) and Princeton (1932–1937).

After his hiring, Crisler began filling out his coaching staff as follows:

- On February 21, 1938, Crisler hired Earl Martineau as his backfield coach at Michigan, assuming the position previously held by Wally Weber. Martineau had been Crisler's backfield coach at Princeton for six years.
- On February 23, 1938, Crisler announced the hiring of Campbell Dickson as an assistant coach, replacing Bennie Oosterbaan in coaching the team's ends. Campbell played at the University of Chicago while Crisler was an assistant coach there, served as an assistant coach with Crisler after graduating in 1924, and was Crisler's ends coach at Princeton from 1932 to 1938.
- On March 1, 1938, Michigan announced the hiring of Biggie Munn as an assistant coach, replacing Hunk Anderson in coaching Michigan's linemen. Munn had been an All-American guard for Crisler at Minnesota in 1931. He was a line coach at Syracuse before being hired by Michigan.

=== Preseason ===
Prior to the hiring of Crisler, Michigan had compiled a 10–22 record in the four years from 1934 to 1937 and had lost four consecutive games to each of its principal rivals, Michigan State, Minnesota and Ohio State. Crisler's arrival led to optimism that Michigan's "era of humiliation" was at an end. At the end of the 1937 season, left tackle Fred Janke from Jackson, Michigan, was chosen by his teammates to serve as captain of the 1938 Michigan football team.

On March 21, 1938, Crisler and his new coaching staff were formally introduced to Michigan's student body at a rally that drew a crowd of 4,500 persons. Crisler told the students he had no "promises or predictions" but pledged that he would make "unqualified demands of 100 percent physical and moral courage" on his team. Later that month, with enthusiasm surrounding the hiring of Crisler, a record 115 candidates registered for Michigan's spring practice.

As fall practice got underway, the media focused on the team's sophomore backfield, including halfbacks Tom Harmon and Paul Kromer and quarterback Forest Evashevski, each of whom had matriculated during Harry Kipke's tenure as head coach. A writer for the Chicago Tribune commented on their "ardor" and "eagerness to assimilate instruction". Crisler rated his team's weaknesses as "[1] lack of team speed; [2] lack of offensive poise; and [3] inexperience in the backfield."

On the eve of the season opener against Michigan State, a capacity crowd was expected, and enthusiasm was running high in Ann Arbor, leading Arch Ward of the Chicago Tribune to quip: "Hitler can have Sudetenland for all they care over here [in Ann Arbor], as long as Crisler gets Michigan. Before night comes down on Ann Arbor tomorrow the world will know whether Michigan or Michigan State will rule this valuable strip of football terrain for the next twelve months."

=== Week 1: Michigan State ===
Week 1: Michigan State at Michigan

Team	1	2	3	4	Total
Michigan State	0	0	0	0	0
• Michigan	0	7	0	7	14

- Date: October 1, 1938
- Location: Michigan Stadium
  Ann Arbor, MI
- Game attendance: 82,500
- Referee: J. S. Getschell (St. Thomas)

On October 1, 1938, the Crisler era at Michigan opened with a 14 to 0 victory over Charlie Bachman's Michigan State team. The game, the 33rd between the two programs, was played at Michigan Stadium before 82,500 spectators.

Sophomore halfback Paul Kromer, appearing in his first game for the Wolverines, scored both touchdowns. Michigan's first points were scored after Fred Trosko intercepted a John Pingel pass at the end of the first quarter, giving Michigan possession at the Spartans' 47-yard line. Kromer scored the touchdown on fourth down from the two-yard line. Michigan's second touchdown was also set up by an interception, with Norm Purucker intercepting a Pingel pass. Kromer again scored on a two-yard run. Michigan's first point after touchdown (PAT) was kicked by left end Vincent Valek. The second PAT kick was blocked, but Kromer picked up the ball and ran around the right end for the point.

Michigan's starting lineup against Michigan State was Valek (left end), Fred Janke (left tackle), John Brennan (left guard), Archie Kodros (center), Ralph Heikkinen (right guard), William Smith (right tackle), John Nicholson (right end), Forest Evashevski (quarterback), Purucker (left halfback), Trosko (right halfback), and Edward Phillips (fullback).

=== Week 2: Chicago ===
Week 2: Chicago at Michigan

Team	1	2	3	4	Total
Chicago	0	7	0	0	7
• Michigan	6	12	7	20	45

- Date: October 8, 1938
- Location: Michigan Stadium
  Ann Arbor, MI
- Referee: Lyle Clarno (Bradley)

On October 8, 1938, Michigan defeated Chicago by a 45 to 7 score. The game was the 25th match in the Chicago–Michigan football rivalry. What had once become a fierce rivalry had become a one-sided affair after the departure of Chicago coach Amos Alonzo Stagg. Michigan's point total was its highest since a 55-3 victory over Michigan State during the Fielding H. Yost era in 1926.

Michigan scored seven touchdowns in the game, each by a different player. Touchdowns were scored by left halfback Norm Purucker (44-yard run in the first quarter), substitute halfback Paul Kromer (25-yard run), substitute end Ed Czak (25-yard touchdown pass from Dave Strong), right halfback Tom Harmon (59-yard run in the third quarter), substitute halfback Fred Trosko (five-yard run in fourth quarter), substitute fullback Howard Mehaffey (31-yard run in fourth quarter), and substitute halfback Dave Strong (14-yard run late in the game). Michigan converted only three of seven PAT attempts with points scored by Danny Smick, John Brennan and Jack Meyer. Michigan totaled 476 rushing yards and 32 passing yards to Chicago's 133 rushing yards and 118 passing yards. Chicago's only score came on a short pass from Lewis Hamity to John Davenport.

Michigan's starting lineup against Michigan State was Dan Smick (left end), Don Siegel (left tackle), John Brennan (left guard), Archie Kodros (center), Ralph Heikkinen (right guard), Roland Savilla (right tackle), John Nicholson (right end), Jack Meyer (quarterback), Purucker (left halfback), Tom Harmon (right halfback), and Edward Phillips (fullback).

=== Week 3: at Minnesota ===
Week 3: Michigan at Minnesota

Team	1	2	3	4	Total
Michigan	0	0	0	6	6
• Minnesota	0	0	0	7	7

- Date: October 15, 1938
- Location: Memorial Stadium
  Minneapolis, MN

On October 15, 1938, Michigan lost its first game of the Crisler era, falling by a 7 to 6 score to Minnesota. The game was the 29th between the programs, with Minnesota having won the previous four games under head coach Bernie Bierman.

Neither team scored in the first three quarters. Then, in the fourth quarter, Michigan drove 90 yards with Paul Kromer scoring on a short run for touchdown. Right end Danny Smick missed the kick for PAT, and Michigan led, 6 to 0. Later in the quarter, Tom Harmon fumbled at midfield, and the Golden Gophers recovered the loose ball. After Harmon's fumble, Minnesota halfback Harold Van Every threw a long pass to Bill Johnson who was downed at Michigan's 14-yard line. Minnesota's drive was capped by a 10-yard touchdown pass from Van Every to halfback Wilbur Moore. Quarterback George Faust kicked the PAT to give Minnesota a one point margin of victory. Michigan gained 157 rushing yards and 97 passing yards to outperform Minnesota's 91 rushing yards and 41 passing yards.

Michigan's starting lineup against Minnesota was Vincent Valek (left end), Fred Janke (left tackle), John Brennan (left guard), Archie Kodros (center), Ralph Heikkinen (right guard), Roland Savilla (right tackle), John Nicholson (right end), Forest Evashevski (quarterback), Norm Purucker (left halfback), Tom Harmon (right halfback), and Edward Phillips (fullback).

=== Week 4: Yale ===
Week 4: Michigan at Yale

Team	1	2	3	4	Total
• Michigan	2	0	6	7	15
Yale	6	7	0	0	13

- Date: October 22, 1938
- Location: Yale Bowl
  New Haven, CT
- Referee: J. E. Keegan (Pittsfield, Mass.)

On October 22, 1938, Michigan defeated Yale by a 15 to 13 score. The game was the first between the two universities in 55 years. The Yale Bulldogs, winners of 27 national championships in the first century of intercollegiate football, had won the last game – in 1883 – by a 64 to 0 score.

Yale scored two touchdowns in the first half and led 13 to 2 at halftime. In the first quarter, Michigan scored after John Nicholson recovered a Yale fumble on the Bulldogs' 28-yard line. On the next play, Tom Harmon gained 20 yards "on a beautiful, snaky run that was the first sign of an offense the Wolverine had shown." Yale's defense held, and the Bulldogs took over on the one-yard line. Michigan then held, and Yale punted from its end zone. Don Siegel blocked the punt and recovered the ball for a safety.

In the third quarter, Michigan narrowed Yale's lead on a 63-yard touchdown drive that included a 52-yard gain on a pass from Harmon to Norm Purucker. Purucker then scored on a two-yard run to narrow Yale's lead to 13 to 8.

In the fourth quarter, Michigan faced fourth down on its own 20-yard line with 19 yards needed for a first down from its own 20-yard line. Norm Purucker punted from deep in Michigan territory, and Yale's Gil Humphrey returned the ball to Michigan's 37-yard line. At that point, sports writer Allison Danzig of The New York Times wrote that Michigan "looked to have met its master." However, Yale was penalized for running into the kicker, resulting in Michigan receiving the ball with a first down at the 25-yard line. From that point, Tom Harmon led the Wolverines on a 75-yard touchdown drive that included three passes from Harmon covering 52 yards. The game-winner was a short pass from Harmon to John Nicholson in the end zone. John Brennan kicked the PAT. The United Press described the game-winning drive as follows:

"Michigan seemed to be fighting for a hopeless cause and the hand crawled around the clock toward the end of the game. In that moment of despair for all those who cheer for Michigan, Harmon came out of nowhere to dominate the field. When the Yale line braced on its own goal, Harmon gambled by waiting patiently with the ball in his hand until John Nicholson could get free to catch the pass that meant defeat for Yale."

After Michigan scored, five minutes remained in the game, but Yale's final drive ended when Forest Evashevski intercepted a Yale pass. Michigan gained 129 rushing yards and 169 passing yards in the game. Yale totaled 69 rushing yards and 145 passing yards.

Michigan's starting lineup against Yale was Nicholson (left end), Fred Janke (left tackle), John Brennan (left guard), Archie Kodros (center), Ralph Heikkinen (right guard), Siegel (right tackle), Vincent Valek (right end), Forest Evashevski (quarterback), Purucker (left halfback), Harmon (right halfback), and Edward Phillips (fullback).

=== Week 5: Illinois ===
Week 5: Illinois at Michigan

Team	1	2	3	4	Total
Illinois	0	0	0	0	0
• Michigan	7	0	7	0	14

- Date: October 29, 1938
- Location: Michigan Stadium
  Ann Arbor, MI
- Referee: James Masker (Northwestern)

On October 29, 1938, Michigan defeated Illinois by a 14 to 0 score. The game was the 24th meeting between the two programs.

In the first quarter, Tom Harmon ran for the Wolverines' first touchdown, "twisting and pushing his way the last few yards." In the third quarter, end Danny Smick blocked an Illinois punt and recovered the ball at the Illinois 29-yard line. After short gains, Harmon "rifled" a pass to Forest Evashevski for Michigan's second touchdown. John Brennan kicked both PATs for Michigan.

Michigan's starting lineup against Illinois was Vincent Valek (left end), Fred Janke (left tackle), John Brennan (left guard), Archie Kodros (center), Ralph Heikkinen (right guard), Siegel (right tackle), John Nicholson (right end), Forest Evashevski (quarterback), Purucker (left halfback), Harmon (right halfback), and Edward Phillips (fullback).

=== Week 6: Penn ===
Week 6: Penn at Michigan

Team	1	2	3	4	Total
Penn	0	0	0	13	13
• Michigan	0	13	6	0	19

- Date: November 5, 1938
- Location: Michigan Stadium
  Ann Arbor, MI
- Referee: James Masker (Northwestern)

On November 5, 1938, Michigan defeated Penn by a 19 to 13 score. The game was the 15th meeting between the two programs with Penn leading the series by eight games to six with two ties.

Michigan's first touchdown was scored by guard Milo Sukup after Don Siegel blocked Frank Reagan's punt and the ball bounced back into the end zone. Paul Kromer scored Michigan's remaining touchdowns, one on a 50-yard punt return and the other on a 13-yard touchdown pass from Fred Trosko. Michigan led 19 to 0 at the start of the fourth quarter. Playing against Michigan's substitutes, Penn scored two touchdowns in the final seven minutes, including a 62-yard touchdown run by Penn quarterback Johnny Dutcher. Jack Meyer kicked one PAT for Michigan.

Michigan's starting lineup against Penn was Dan Smick (left end), Fred Janke (left tackle), John Brennan (left guard), Tinker (center), Ralph Heikkinen (right guard), Siegel (right tackle), Ed Frutig (right end), Forest Evashevski (quarterback), Paul Kromer (left halfback), Tom Harmon (right halfback), and Mehaffey (fullback).

=== Week 7: Northwestern ===
Week 7: Northwestern at Michigan

Team	1	2	3	4	Total
Northwestern	0	0	0	0	0
Michigan	0	0	0	0	0

- Date: November 12, 1938
- Location: Michigan Stadium
  Ann Arbor, MI
- Referee: Fred Gardner (Cornell)

On November 12, 1938, Michigan played Northwestern to a scoreless tie. The game was the 14th between the two programs, with the previous three games resulting in Northwestern victories.

Both teams threatened in the second half, but neither was able to score. In the third quarter, Northwestern's Bernie Jefferson had a 51-yard run to Michigan's 11-yard line. Northwestern advanced to the one-yard line with a first-and-goal opportunity. After three unsuccessful running plays, Northwestern passed on fourth down, and the ball was intercepted in the end zone by Norm Purucker of Michigan. In the fourth quarter, Michigan advanced the ball to the Northwestern six-yard line, but a field goal attempt by Fred Trosko was unsuccessful. With one minute remaining, Purucker faked a punt and ran 44 yards to Northwestern's 25-yard line, but Michigan was unable to score. Northwestern outgained Michigan in the game with 176 rushing yards and 69 passing yards to 135 rushing yards and 92 passing yards for Michigan.

Michigan's starting lineup against Northwestern was John Nicholson (left end), Don Siegel (left tackle), John Brennan (left guard), Archie Kodros (center), Ralph Heikkinen (right guard), William Smith (right tackle), Dan Smick (right end), Forest Evashevski (quarterback), Paul Kromer (left halfback), Tom Harmon (right halfback), and R. Wallace Hook (fullback).

=== Week 8: at Ohio State ===
Week 8: Michigan at Ohio State

Team	1	2	3	4	Total
• Michigan	0	6	0	12	18
Ohio State	0	0	0	0	0

- Date: November 19, 1938
- Location: Ohio Stadium
  Columbus, OH
- Game attendance: 67,554
- Referee: James Masker (Northwestern)

On November 19, 1938, in the final game of the 1938 season, Michigan defeated Ohio State 18 to 0 in Columbus. The game was the 35th installment in the Michigan–Ohio State football rivalry. Ohio State had won four consecutive shutouts over Michigan from 1934 to 1937.

In the second quarter, Michigan fullback Wallace Hook fell on an Ohio State fumble at the Buckeyes' 16-yard line. Tom Harmon ran for a touchdown from the one-yard line, tallying Michigan's first points against Ohio State since 1933. In the fourth quarter, Harmon intercepted an Ohio State pass and then threw a 15-yard pass to Ed Frutig for Michigan's second touchdown. Michigan's final score was set up by an interception by substitute quarterback Louis Levine; Fred Trosko then ran 38 yards around the left end for a touchdown. Michigan's attempts at point after touchdown (one each by Harmon, Norm Purucker, and John Brennan) were all unsuccessful. After the game, a brawl erupted on the field as Michigan fans attempted to tear down the goalposts at Ohio Stadium.

The game's outcome was the most one-sided loss for Ohio State in five years under head coach, Francis Schmidt. The United Press opined that Michigan's victory over the Buckeyes was the "climax of the Wolverines' return as a major gridiron power."

Michigan's starting lineup against Ohio State was Danny Smick (left end), Fred Janke (left tackle), Ralph Heikkinen (left guard), Archie Kodros (center), John Brennan (right guard), Don Siegel (right tackle), John Nicholson (right end), Jack Meyer (quarterback), Paul Kromer (left halfback), Tom Harmon (right halfback), and Edward Philips (fullback).

=== Post-season ===
The 1938 Michigan team finished with a 6–1–1 (3–1–1 Big Ten) record, having outscored its opponents 131 to 40, with four shutouts in eight games, and having allowed an average of only five points per game. In the post-season rankings by Frank Dickinson, the University of Illinois professor who developed the Dickinson System for determining college football's national championship, Notre Dame was ranked as the country's top team with 27.72 points, while Michigan was ranked sixth with 23.02 points, three-tenths of a point ahead of Minnesota. In the final AP Poll, TCU was ranked as the top team, and Michigan was ranked 16th.

On December 11, 1938, Crisler was honored at a banquet hosted by Michigan's New York alumni for having brought the Wolverines "out of the football depression."

With respect to individual honors, guard Ralph Heikkinen was Michigan's most decorated player in 1938. Heikkinen was a unanimous All-American, receiving first-team honors from the All-America Board, the Associated Press, the Central Press Association, Collier's Weekly, the International News Service, Liberty magazine, the Newspaper Enterprise Association, Newsweek, the New York Sun, the Sporting News, the United Press, and the Walter Camp Football Foundation. Heikkinen was also named Michigan's Most Valuable Player, becoming the first player in Michigan history to receive the honor in consecutive years. Heikkinen also placed second behind Wisconsin fullback Howard Weiss in close voting for the Chicago Tribune Silver Football trophy, honoring the most valuable player in the Big Ten Conference.

Three Wolverines were selected as first-team players on the 1938 All-Big Ten Conference football team. Ralph Heikkinen and Tom Harmon were named first-team players by both the Associated Press and United Press, while Forest Evashevski received first-team honors from the Associated Press. Harmon and Evashevski were the first sophomores to be so honored since 1934.

Junior center Archie Kodros was selected by his 1938 teammates to serve as the captain of the 1939 Michigan team.

== Players ==
=== Varsity letter winners ===
- John Brennan, Racine, Wisconsin - started six games at left guard, two games at right guard
- Forest Evashevski, Detroit, MI - started six games at quarterback
- Ralph Fritz, New Kensington, Pennsylvania - guard
- Ed Frutig, River Rouge, Michigan - started one game at right end
- Elmer Gedeon, Cleveland, Ohio - end
- Tom Harmon, Gary, Indiana - started seven games at right halfback
- Ralph Heikkinen, Ramsay, Michigan - started six games at right guard, two games at left guard
- R. Wallace Hook, Jr., East Grand Rapids, Michigan - started one game at fullback
- Fred Janke, Jackson, Michigan - started six games at left tackle
- Archie Kodros, Alton, Illinois - started seven games at center
- Paul Kromer, Lorain, Ohio - started four games at left halfback
- Louis Levine, Muskegon Heights, Michigan - quarterback
- Howard H. Mehaffey, Pittsburgh, Pennsylvania - started one game at fullback
- Jack Meyer, Elyria, Ohio - started two games at quarterback
- John Nicholson, Elkhart, Indiana - started six games at right end, one game at left end
- Frederick Olds, East Lansing, Michigan - guard
- Edward Philips, Bradford, Pennsylvania - started six games at fullback
- Norm Purucker, Youngstown, Ohio - started four games at left halfback
- Hercules Renda, Jochin, West Virginia - halfback
- Roland Savilla, Gallagher, West Virginia - started two games at right tackle
- Don Siegel, Royal Oak, Michigan - started four games at right tackle, two games at left tackle
- Danny Smick, Hazel Park, Michigan - started three games at left end, one game at right end
- William Smith, Riverside, California - started two games at right tackle
- Dave Strong, Helena, Montana - halfback
- Milo Sukup, Muskegon Heights, Michigan - guard
- Horace Tinker, Battle Creek, Michigan - started one game at center
- Fred Trosko, Flint, Michigan - one game at right halfback
- Vincent Valek, Holly, Michigan – started four games at left end

=== Reserves ===
- Arthur Bennett, Schenectady, New York - guard
- Charles Bowers, Pontiac, Michigan
- Edward Christy, Gary, Indiana - fullback
- Ed Czak, Elyria, Ohio - end
- Robert Flora, Muskegon, Michigan - tackle
- Thomas Ford, East Grand Rapids, Michigan - center
- James Harrison, Memphis, Tennessee
- Robert M. Hook, East Grand Rapids, Michigan - tackle
- Forrest Jordan, Clare, Michigan - guard
- Reuben Kelto, Bessemer, Michigan - center
- Walter Kitti, Calumet, Michigan - quarterback
- Harry Kohl, Dayton, Ohio - quarterback
- Dennis Kuhn, River Rouge, Michigan - tackle
- Derwood Laskey, Milan, Michigan - halfback
- William Luther, Toledo, Ohio - halfback
- George S. Manolakas, Detroit, MI
- Michael Megregian, Detroit, MI - halfback
- Paul Nielsen, Ann Arbor, Michigan - end
- Arthur Paddy, Benton Harbor, Michigan - guard
- William G. Parfet, Golden, Colorado - end
- Lester Persky, Cleveland Heights, Ohio - quarterback
- Norman Rosenfeld, Detroit, MI
- Charles Ross, Cambridge, Massachusetts
- Jack Steketee, Detroit, MI - center
- A. Burgess Vial, LaGrange, Illinois - fullback
- William E. Vollmer, Manistee, Michigan - tackle
- Larry D. Wickter, Toledo, Ohio - fullback

=== Awards and honors ===
- Captain: Fred Janke
- All-Americans: Ralph Heikkinen
- All-Big Ten: Ralph Heikkinen, Forest Evashevski, Tom Harmon
- Most Valuable Player: Ralph Heikkinen
- Meyer Morton Award: Archie Kodros

=== Scoring leaders ===
Player	Touchdowns	Extra points	Field goals	Safeties	Total Points
Paul Kromer	6	1	0	0	37
Tom Harmon	3	0	0	0	18
Norm Purucker	2	0	0	0	12
Fred Trosko	2	0	0	0	12
Ed Czak	1	0	0	0	6
Forest Evashevski	1	0	0	0	6
Ed Frutig	1	0	0	0	6
Howard Mehaffey	1	0	0	0	6
John Nicholson	1	0	0	0	6
Dave Strong	1	0	0	0	6
Milo Sukup	1	0	0	0	6
John Brennan	0	4	0	0	4
Jack Meyer	0	2	0	0	2
Don Siegel	0	0	0	1	2
Danny Smick	0	1	0	0	1
Vincent Valek	0	1	0	0	1
Totals	20	9	0	1	131

=== Professional players ===
Six players from the 1938 Michigan team went on to play in the National Football League or Major League Baseball:

- John Brennan - Green Bay Packers (1939)
- Ralph Fritz - Philadelphia Eagles (1941)
- Ed Frutig - Green Bay Packers (1941, 1945), Detroit Lions (1945–1946)
- Elmer Gedeon - Washington Senators (MLB) (1939)
- Tom Harmon - Los Angeles Rams (1946–1947)
- Ralph Heikkinen - Brooklyn Dodgers (NFL) (1939)

== Coaching staff ==
- Head coach: Fritz Crisler
- Assistant coaches: Campbell Dickson (ends), Earl Martineau (backfield), Biggie Munn (line), Bennie Oosterbaan, Wally Weber
- Trainer: Ray Roberts
- Manager: Philip Woodworth, Carl Wheeler (assistant), Norman Kewele (assistant), Eugene Klein (assistant), William Delbridge (assistant)
