= History of Michigan Wolverines football in the Crisler years =

Michigan Wolverines football
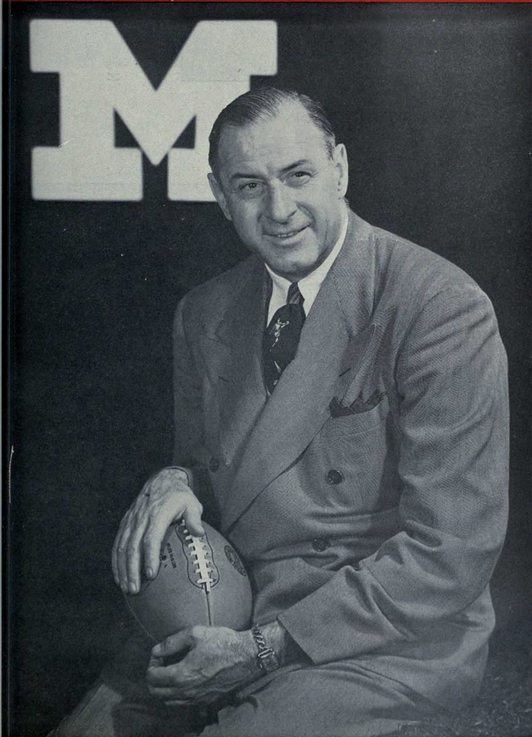
- Athletic director: Fielding H. Yost; Fritz Crisler
- Head coach: Fritz Crisler; 10 season, 71–16–3 (.806)
- Location: Ann Arbor, Michigan
- Stadium: Michigan Stadium
- Conference: Big Ten Conference
- Colors: Maize and blue
- Bowl record: 1–0 (1.000)

National championships
- Claimed: 1

Conference championships
- 2

Division championships
- 0
- Heisman winners: 1
- Fight song: "The Victors"
- Marching band: Michigan Marching Band

The History of Michigan Wolverines football in the Crisler years covers the history of the University of Michigan Wolverines football program during the period from the hiring of Fritz Crisler as head coach in 1938 through his retirement as head coach after winning the 1948 Rose Bowl. Michigan was a member of the Big Ten Conference during the Crisler years and played its home games at Michigan Stadium.

During the 10 years in which Crisler served as head football coach, Michigan compiled a record of 71–16–3 (.806). Tom Harmon played for the Wolverines from 1938 to 1940 and in 1940 became the first Michigan player to win the Heisman Trophy. The 1947 Michigan team, sometimes known as the "Mad Magicians", compiled a perfect 10–0 record, outscored its opponents 394–53, defeated the USC Trojans 49–0 in the 1948 Rose Bowl game, and were selected as the nation's No. 1 team by a 226–119 margin over Notre Dame in an unprecedented AP Poll taken after the bowl games. Bob Chappuis finished second in the Heisman Trophy voting in 1947.

Eleven players from the Crisler years have been inducted into the College Football Hall of Fame. They are Chappuis, Bump Elliott, Pete Elliott, Harmon, Bob Westfall, Elroy "Crazy Legs" Hirsch, Forest Evashevski (inducted as a coach), David M. Nelson (inducted as coach), Tubby Raymond (inducted as coach), Albert "Ox" Wistert, and Alvin "Moose" Wistert. Two have also been inducted into the Pro Football Hall of Fame — Hirsch and Len Ford. Three members of the coaching staff have also been inducted into the College Football Hall of Fame. They are Crisler, Clarence "Biggie" Munn, and Bennie Oosterbaan (inducted as player).

== Year-by-year results ==
Season	Head coach	Conference	Place	Record	PF	PA
1938 team	Fritz Crisler	Big Ten Conference	2nd	6–1–1	131	40
1939 team	Fritz Crisler	Big Ten	3rd	6–2	219	94
1940 team	Fritz Crisler	Big Ten	2nd	7–1	196	34
1941 team	Fritz Crisler	Big Ten	2nd	6–1–1	147	41
1942 team	Fritz Crisler	Big Ten	3rd	7–3	221	134
1943 team	Fritz Crisler	Big Ten	1st (tie)	8–1	302	73
1944 team	Fritz Crisler	Big Ten	2nd	8–2	204	91
1945 team	Fritz Crisler	Big Ten	2nd	7–3	187	99
1946 team	Fritz Crisler	Big Ten	2nd	6–2–1	233	73
1947 team	Fritz Crisler	Big Ten	1st	10–0	394	53

== Rivalries ==
=== Michigan State ===
Crisler is the only head coach in Michigan football history who served for more than two years and maintained an undefeated record in the Michigan – Michigan State football rivalry. Crisler compiled a perfect 8–0 record against the Spartans, including four shutouts in 1938 (14–0), 1942 (20–0), 1945 (40–0), and 1946 (55–0). Biggie Munn, who was an assistant coach under Crisler from 1938 to 1945, served as head coach at Michigan State from 1947 to 1953 and as athletic director from 1954 to 1971.

=== Minnesota ===
During the Crisler years, Michigan compiled a 5–5 record in its annual Little Brown Jug rivalry game with the Minnesota Golden Gophers. Minnesota defeated Michigan five straight years in the first half of the Crisler years. Under head coach Bernie Bierman, Minnesota compiled a nine-game winning streak over Michigan extending from 1934 to 1942. By the mid-1940s, with Bierman gone as head coach, the Golden Gophers fell from the top tier of teams, and Michigan concluded the Crisler years with five consecutive victories from 1943 to 1947.

During the Crisler years, the Little Brown Jug games often took on national significance, as the two teams came into several games ranked among the top teams in the country. Significant games include the following:

- In 1938, Minnesota was responsible for Michigan's only loss in the first season under Crisler. The Golden Gophers won a close game by a score of 7 to 6. Minnesota and Michigan ended the 1938 season ranked #10 and #16 in the final AP poll.
- In 1940, Michigan and Minnesota were undefeated and ranked #2 and #3 in the AP poll before the game. Michigan took the lead on a touchdown pass from Tom Harmon to Forest Evashevski, but Harmon's kick for the extra point went wide. Minnesota responded with its own touchdown and converted its extra point attempt to win the game by a 7–6 score. Minnesota finished the 1940 season undefeated and with a national championship. Michigan was ranked #3 in the final AP Poll of 1940.
- In 1941, the teams were again undefeated heading into the game. Minnesota won the game 7–0. Minnesota went on to claim its second consecutive national championship, and Michigan was ranked #5 in the final AP poll.
- In 1947, the Wolverines were ranked #1 in the country and had averaged 55 points in the first four games of the season. The Golden Gophers gave the Wolverines the toughest game of the season. Michigan's star back Bob Chappuis was held to 26 rushing yards, less than two yards per carry. While the Wolverines won, 13 to 6, the close score resulted in Notre Dame moving ahead of Michigan to claim the #1 spot in the AP Poll.

=== Notre Dame ===
After a 30-year hiatus in the Michigan–Notre Dame football rivalry from 1910 through 1941, the two teams met in 1942 and 1943.

- In 1942, Notre Dame came into the game ranked #4 in the AP Poll, and Michigan was ranked #6. Michigan won the game, 32–20, in front of a capacity crowd of 57,500 at Notre Dame Stadium. Michigan's total of 32 points was the most scored against a Notre Dame team since 1905. Michigan's first touchdown came on a quarterback sneak by George Ceithaml from the one-yard line. Don Robinson ran for Michigan's second touchdown on a fake field goal attempt, and Tom Kuzma scored two touchdowns in the second half.
- In 1943, the teams came into the game with undefeated records and ranked #1 and #2 in the AP Poll. The highly anticipated game broke the Michigan Stadium attendance records with a crowd of 85,688. The previous record was a crowd of 85,088 that attended the 1929 Michigan-Ohio State game. Notre Dame won the game, 35–12. According to the United Press game account, the passing by Angelo Bertelli (1943 Heisman Trophy winner) "caught the Wolverine secondary flatfooted and out of position repeatedly to make the rout complete." The third quarter was marked by a malfunction of the electric clock, resulting in a third quarter that lasted 23 minutes. Notre Dame outscored Michigan 14–0 in the long third quarter. After nine plays had been run in the fourth quarter, the timing error was discovered, and an announcement was made over the stadium's public address system that only two-and-a-half minutes remained in the game, as the fourth quarter was shortened to seven minutes. The only points in the short fourth quarter came on the last play of the game as Elroy Hirsch threw a 13-yard touchdown pass to Paul White. Dame went on to win the 1943 national championship.

After the 1943 game, the programs did not meet again until 1978.

=== Ohio State ===
During the Crisler years, Michigan compiled a 6-2-1 record in the Michigan–Ohio State football rivalry. Significant games during the Crisler years include:

- In 1939, Ohio State came into the game ranked #6 in the country with Michigan unranked and having two losses. The Wolverines upset the Buckeyes, 21–14.
- In 1940, the game marked the final college football game to be played by Tom Harmon after three brilliant years for the Wolverines. Michigan defeated Ohio State 40–0. Harmon ran for three touchdowns, threw two touchdown passes, and converted four PATs. He also averaged 50 yards per punt on three punts. When Harmon left the field with 38 seconds remaining, the crowd in Columbus gave a standing ovation to a Michigan football player.
- In 1942, the teams came into the game ranked #4 and #5 in the AP poll. The Buckeyes won the game, 21 to 7, in Ann Arbor. The victory over the Wolverines helped propel Ohio State to the #1 spot in the final AP Poll, as Ohio State won its first national championship.
- In 1944, Ohio State came into the game ranked #3 and undefeated. Michigan was ranked #6 and had one loss. The Buckeyes defeated the Wolverines, 18–14, in Columbus. Ohio State narrowly missed its second national championship, being ranked #2 in the final AP Poll.
- In 1945, both teams were ranked among the top ten in the AP Poll, and Michigan won, 7–3.

== Coaching staff and administration ==
=== Assistant coaches ===
- William C. Barclay – assistant coach, 1943–1945
- Jack Blott – assistant coach, 1924–1933, 1946–1958 (head football coach at Wesleyan, 1934–1940)
- George Ceithaml – assistant coach, 1947–1952
- Campbell Dickson – assistant coach, 1938–1939
- Ray Fisher – assistant coach, 1921–1928, 1934–1936, 1943–1945 (also Michigan's head baseball coach, 1921–1958)
- Forrest Jordan – assistant coach, 1946–1947
- Cliff Keen – assistant coach 1926–1930, 1932–1936, 1941, 1946–1958 (also Michigan's wrestling coach, 1925–1970)
- Archie Kodros – player, 1937–1939; assistant coach, 1940–1941 (later head football coach at Whitman, 1949–1950, and Hawaii, 1951)
- Earl Martineau – assistant coach, 1938–1945 (head coach at Western Michigan, 1924–1928)
- Ernie McCoy, 1940–1942, 1945–1951 (also Michigan's head basketball coach, 1948–1952; athletic director at Penn State, 1952–1970)
- Clarence "Biggie" Munn – assistant coach, 1938–1945 (later head coach at Syracuse, 1946, and Michigan State, 1947–1953)
- Bennie Oosterbaan – assistant coach, 1928–1947 (also Michigan's head basketball coach, 1938–1946, and head football coach, 1948–1958)
- Hercules Renda – halfback, 1937–1939; assistant coach, 1940–1941
- Arthur Valpey – end, 1935–1937; assistant coach, 1943–1947 (later head coach at Harvard, 1948–1949, and Connecticut, 1950–1951)
- Wally Weber – assistant coach, 1931–1958

=== Others ===
- Ralph W. Aigler – chairman of Michigan's Faculty Board in Control of Athletics, 1917–1942, faculty representative to the Big Ten Conference, 1917–1955
- Charles B. Hoyt – trainer, 1941–1942
- Jim Hunt – trainer, 1947–1967
- Ray Roberts – trainer, 1930–1940, 1943–1946

== Players ==
Name	Start Year	Last Year	Position(s)	Notes
John Brennan	1936	1938	Guard	Voted "queen" of UM's 1939 ice festival; played for the Green Bay Packers (1939).
Jim Brieske	1942	1947	Placekicker, center	Set collegiate, Big Ten, Rose Bowl, and Michigan placekicking records
Jerry Burns	1947	1950	Quarterback	Served as coach at Iowa (assistant, 1954–1960, head coach, 1961–1965) and for the Minnesota Vikings (assistant, 1968–1985, head coach, 1986–1991)
Bob Callahan	1945	1946	Center, Tackle	Played for the Buffalo Bills (AAFC) (1948)
Jack Carpenter	1946	1946	Tackle	Played for the Buffalo Bills (AAFC)(1947–1949), San Francisco 49ers (1949), Hamilton Tiger-Cats (1950–1951) Toronto Argonauts (1952–1954).
George Ceithaml	1940	1942	Quarterback	All-Big Ten quarterback, 1942; Crisler called him "the smartest player he ever taught"; served as an assistant coach at Michigan and USC
Bob Chappuis	1946	1947	Halfback	Shot down over Italy in World War II; All-American and 2nd in Heisman Trophy voting (1947); played for Brooklyn Dodgers (AAFC) (1948) and Chicago Hornets (1949)
Bill Daley	1943	1943	Fullback	All-American, 1943; Played for the Brooklyn Dodgers (AAFC) (1946), Miami Seahawks (1946), Chicago Rockets (1947), and New York Yankees (AAFC) (1948)
Fred Dawley	1939	1941	Fullback	Played for the Detroit Lions (1944) and Los Angeles Bulldogs (1945)
Robert Derleth	1942	1946	Tackle	Played for the Detroit Lions (1947)
Gene Derricotte	1946	1948	Halfback, Quarterback	Served as a Tuskegee Airman during World War II; holds Michigan's single season record for punt return average
Wally Dreyer	1943	1943	Halfback	Played for Chicago Bears (1949) and Green Bay Packers (1950); head football coach for the University of Wisconsin–Milwaukee Panthers.
Dan Dworsky	1945	1948	Fullback, Center, Quarterback	Played for the Los Angeles Dons (1949); later became an architect and designed Crisler Arena and Drake Stadium (UCLA).
Bump Elliott	1946	1947	Halfback	Michigan's head coach, 1959–1968; inducted into College Football Hall of Fame, 1989
Pete Elliott	1945	1948	Quarterback, Halfback	Later served as head football coach at Nebraska(1956), California (1957–59), Illinois(1960–66), and Miami (1973–74); inducted into the College Football Hall of Fame, 1994
Forest Evashevski	1938	1940	Quarterback	All-Big Ten quarterback three straight years; head football coach at Iowa 1952–1960; inducted into College Football Hall of Fame in 2000
Henry Fonde	1945	1947	Halfback	Threw a 47-yard touchdown pass in 1948 Rose Bowl; Head coach at Ann Arbor Pioneer HS for 10 years; Asst. coach at Michigan for 10 years
Len Ford	1945	1947	End	Played 11 years in the AAFC and NFL with the Dons, Browns and Packers; inducted into the Pro Football Hall of Fame in 1976
Julius Franks	1941	1942	Guard	First-team All-American 1942; Michigan's first African-American All-American
Ralph Fritz	1939	1940	Guard	Played 1 year in the NFL for the Eagles
Ed Frutig	1938	1940	End	First-team All-American 1940; Played 3 years in the NFL with the Packers and Lions
Elmer Gedeon	1936	1938	End	Played baseball for the Washington Senators; one of two MLB players killed in action during World War II after being shot down while piloting a B-26 bomber in 1944
John Ghindia	1947	1949	Quarterback, Fullback, Halfback	Starting quarterback on the 1949 Michigan Wolverines football team that finished the season ranked No. 7 in the country; later served as a high school football and tennis coach in Wyandotte and Ecorse, Michigan.
John Greene	1940	1943	Tackle, Quarterback	Later played 7 years in the NFL with the Lions
Tom Harmon	1938	1940	Halfback	1940 Heisman Trophy winner
Ralph Heikkinen	1936	1938	Guard	All-American 1939; MVP of the 1937 and 1938 Michigan football teams; Played 1 year in the NFL for the Brooklyn Dodgers
Bruce Hilkene	1943	1947	Tackle	Captain of the undefeated 1947 Michigan team known as the "Mad Magicians"
Elroy "Crazy Legs" Hirsch	1943	1943	Halfback	Only Michigan athlete to letter in football, baseball, basketball and track in the same year; Played 12 years in AAFC and NFL for Rockets and Rams; Inducted into College (1974) and Pro Football Hall of Fame (1968).
Bob Hollway	1947	1949	End	Later served as head coach of the St. Louis Cardinals, 1971–1972
Robert Ingalls	1939	1941	Center	Later played for the Green Bay Packers, 1942; served as the head football coach at the University of Connecticut, 1952–1963
Fred Janke	1936	1938	Tackle, Fullback	Later became the president and chairman of the board of Hancock Industries; also served as the mayorJackson, Michigan, in the 1970s.
Farnham Johnson	1943	1943	End	Later played with the Chicago Rockets of the All-America Football Conference in 1948.
Jack Karwales	1941	1942	End, tackle	Later played professional football for theChicago Bears in 1946 and for theChicago Cardinals in 1947.
Reuben Kelto	1939	1941	Tackle	MVP 1941 Michigan team; Upper Peninsula Hall of Fame
Dick Kempthorn	1947	1949	Fullback	MVP 1949 Michigan team; Won Distinguished Flying Cross as a jet fighter pilot in the Korean War
Archie Kodros	1937	1939	Center	Later served as head football coach at Whitman and Hawaii; assistant coach at Iowa for 14 years
Ralph Kohl	1947	1948	Tackle	Later coached at Eastern Illinois and was head scout for the Minnesota Vikings
Robert Kolesar	1940	1942	Guard	Played for Cleveland Browns, 1946
Paul Kromer	1938	1940	Halfback	Formed the "Touchdown Twins" combination with Tom Harmon in 1938
Tom Kuzma	1941	1942	Halfback	Followed Tom Harmon as Michigan's main running back; Finished 2nd in the Big Ten in total offense, 1941
Milan Lazetich	1944	1944	Tackle, Guard, Linebacker	First-team All-Big Ten and second-team All-American, 1944; Played 6 years in the NFL for the Rams; First-team All-NFL, 1948–1949
Don Lund	1942	1944	Fullback	Played 10 years in Major League Baseball
Elmer Madar	1941	1946	End, Quarterback	Part of the "Seven Oak Posts' line in 1942; played for the Baltimore Colts (1947)
Bob Mann	1944	1947	End	All-Big Ten, 1947; Broke the Big Ten record for receiving yards in 1946 and again in 1947; Played 7 years in the NFL with the Lions and Packers; First African-American for both NFL teams; Led the NFL in receiving yards and yards per catch in 1949
Earl Maves	1943	1943	Fullback	Later played for the Detroit Lions (1948)
Tony Momsen	1945	1950	Center	Played for the Pittsburgh Steelers and washington Redskins
Vincent Mroz	1943	1943	End	Served for 26 years in United States Secret Service, shot attempted assassin of Pres. Harry S. Truman in 1950
Fred Negus	1943	1943	Center	Later played pro football for the Chicago Rockets and Chicago Bears
David M. Nelson	1939	1941	Halfback	Inducted into the College Football Hall of Fame as a coach
Bob Nussbaumer	1943	1945	Halfback	Later played for the Washington Redskins (1947–48), Green Bay Packers (1946, 1951), and the Chicago Cardinals (1949–1950)
Jack Petoskey	1941	1943	End	Later coached football at Hillsdale College and Western Michigan University
Joseph Ponsetto	1944	1945	Quarterback	All-Big Ten quarterback, 1944
Merv Pregulman	1941	1943	Center, Tackle	Played 4 years in NFL; inducted into College Football Hall of Fame
Bill Pritula	1942	1947	Tackle	One of Michigan's "Seven Oak Posts" in 1942
Tubby Raymond	1946	1948	Quarterback, Linebacker	Coach at Delaware, 1966–2001; inducted to College Football Hall of Fame
Russ Reader	1945	1945	Halfback	Later played professional football for the Chicago Bears (1947) and Toronto Argonauts (1949)
Hercules Renda	1937	1939	Halfback	Later served as assistant coach under Crisler (1940–1941_ to 1941); also as a high school football and track coach in Pontiac, Michigan; inducted into the Michigan High School Coaches Hall of Fame.
Art Renner	1943	1946	End	Captain of the 1946 team
Dick Rifenburg	1944	1948	End	Played for the Detroit Lions, 1950
Don Robinson	1941	1946	Halfback, Quarterback	Assistant football coach at Michigan, 1948–1956
Quentin Sickels	1944	1948	Guard	Played on Michigan's undefeated 1947 and 1948 national championship teams
Rudy Smeja	1941	1943	End	Later played three years in the NFL for the Chicago Bears and Philadelphia Eagles
Joe Soboleski	1945	1948	Guard, Tackle	Played 4 years for Chicago Hornets, Washington Redskins, Detroit Lions, New York Yanks, and Dallas Texans
Milo Sukup	1938	1940	Guard	Running guard and key blocker for Tom Harmon; later football coach in Grand Rapids 1942–1971
Wally Teninga	1945	1949	Halfback	Played on back-to-back undefeated teams (1947–48); later became the vice chairman and chief financial officer of the Kmart Corporation
Dominic Tomasi	1945	1948	Guard	Captain and Most Valuable Player of the National Champion 1948 Michigan Wolverines football team
Fred Trosko	1937	1939	Halfback	Meyer Morton Award in 1937; head football coach at Eastern Michigan, 1952–64
Harold Watts	1943	1946	Center	MVP 1945 Michigan team; All-Big Ten, 1945
Jack Weisenburger	1944	1947	Fullback, halfback, quarterback	Starting fullback for the 1947 "Mad Magicians" team
Bob Westfall	1939	1941	Fullback	All-American, 1941; Played 4 years in the NFL with the Lions; All-Pro in 1945; Inducted into College Football Hall of Fame in 1987
J. T. White	1946	1947	Center	2nd team All-American 1947; Played for Big Ten championship teams at Michigan (1947) and Ohio State (1942); Later served as an assistant coach and assistant athletic director at Penn State
Paul White	1941	1946	Halfback	Played 1 year in the NFL for the Steelers
Bob Wiese	1942	1946	Fullback, Quarterback	Played 2 years in the NFL with the Lions
F. Stuart Wilkins	1945	1948	Guard	Founding director and chairman of the board (1984–1997) of the Pro Football Hall of Fame in Canton, Ohio; Served as chairman of the board of the American Automobile Association
Jack Wink	1943	1943	Quarterback	Also played at Wisconsin (1942, 1946–1947); head football coach at Wayne State (NE), Wisconsin–Stout, St. Cloud State
Al Wistert	1940	1942	Tackle	All-American, 1942; MVP 1942 Michigan team; Inducted into College Football Hall of Fame, 1967; His No. 11 is 1 of 5 retired numbers at Michigan; Played 9 years in the NFL for the Steagles and Eagles; 8-time All-Pro
Alvin Wistert	1947	1949	Tackle	All-American, 1948 and 1949; Inducted into College Football Hall of Fame, 1967; Oldest college football player ever selected as an All-American at age 33; His No. 11 is 1 of 5 retired numbers at Michigan
Irv Wisniewski	1946	1949	End	Later coached football and basketball at Hillsdale College and the University of Delaware
Howard Yerges	1944	1947	Quarterback	Played for Ohio State in 1943; Quarterback of the undefeated 1947 team known as the "Mad Magicians"; All-Big Ten 1947
