= 1938 Minnesota Golden Gophers football team =

American college football season

1938 Minnesota Golden Gophers football

Big Ten champion
- Conference: Big Ten Conference

Ranking
- AP: No. 10
- Record: 6–2 (4–1 Big Ten)
- Head coach: Bernie Bierman (7th season)
- Offensive scheme: Single-wing
- MVP: Larry Buhler
- Captain: Frank Twedell
- Home stadium: Memorial Stadium

1938 Big Ten Conference football standings
	Conf.					Overall
Team	W		L		T	W		L		T
No. 10 Minnesota $	4	–	1	–	0	6	–	2	–	0
No. 16 Michigan	3	–	1	–	1	6	–	1	–	1
Purdue	3	–	1	–	1	5	–	1	–	2
No. 17 Northwestern	2	–	1	–	2	4	–	2	–	2
Wisconsin	3	–	2	–	0	5	–	3	–	0
Ohio State	3	–	2	–	1	4	–	3	–	1
Illinois	2	–	3	–	0	3	–	5	–	0
Iowa	1	–	3	–	1	1	–	6	–	1
Indiana	1	–	4	–	0	1	–	6	–	1
Chicago	0	–	4	–	0	1	–	6	–	1
$ – Conference champion; Rankings from AP Poll

The 1938 Minnesota Golden Gophers football team represented the University of Minnesota in the 1938 Big Ten Conference football season. In their seventh year under head coach Bernie Bierman, the Golden Gophers compiled a 6–2 record and outscored their opponents by a combined total of 97 to 38.

Guard Frank Twedell was named an All-American by the Associated Press and United Press. Twedell and quarterback Wilbur Moore were named All-Big Ten first team.

Fullback Larry Buhler was awarded the Team MVP Award.

Total attendance for the season was 237,000, which averaged to 47,400. The season high for attendance was against Michigan.

== Schedule ==
Date	Opponent	Rank	Site	Result	Attendance
September 24	Washington*		Memorial Stadium; Minneapolis, MN	W 15–0	50,000
October 1	Nebraska*		Memorial Stadium; Minneapolis, MN (rivalry)	W 16–7	46,000
October 8	Purdue		Memorial Stadium; Minneapolis, MN	W 7–0	52,000
October 15	Michigan^{†}		Memorial Stadium; Minneapolis, MN (Little Brown Jug)	W 7–6	54,212
October 29	at No. 12 Northwestern	No. 2	Dyche Stadium; Evanston, IL	L 3–6	48,000
November 5	Iowa	No. 12	Memorial Stadium; Minneapolis, MN (rivalry)	W 28–0	42,000
November 12	at No. 2 Notre Dame*	No. 12	Notre Dame Stadium; Notre Dame, IN	L 0–19	55,245
November 19	at No. 12 Wisconsin		Camp Randall Stadium; Madison, WI (rivalry)	W 21–0	38,000
*Non-conference game; ^{†}Homecoming; Rankings from AP Poll released prior to the game

== Game summaries ==
=== Michigan ===
Week 3: Michigan at Minnesota

Team	1	2	3	4	Total
Michigan	0	0	0	6	6
• Minnesota	0	0	0	7	7

- Date: October 15, 1938
- Location: Memorial Stadium
  Minneapolis

On October 15, 1938, Minnesota defeated Michigan by a 7 to 6 score. The game was the 29th between the programs, with Minnesota having won the previous four games under head coach Bernie Bierman.

Neither team scored in the first three quarters. Then, in the fourth quarter, Michigan drove 90 yards with Paul Kromer scoring on a short run for touchdown. Right end Danny Smick missed the kick for PAT, and Michigan led, 6 to 0. Later in the quarter, Tom Harmon fumbled at midfield, and the Golden Gophers recovered the loose ball. After Harmon's fumble, Minnesota halfback Harold Van Every threw a long pass to Bill Johnson who was downed at Michigan's 14-yard line. Minnesota's drive was capped by a 10-yard touchdown pass from Van Every to halfback Wilbur Moore. Quarterback George Faust kicked the PAT to give Minnesota a one-point margin of victory. Michigan gained 157 rushing yards and 97 passing yards to outperform Minnesota's 91 rushing yards and 41 passing yards.
