= 1938 Wisconsin Badgers football team =

American college football season

1938 Wisconsin Badgers football
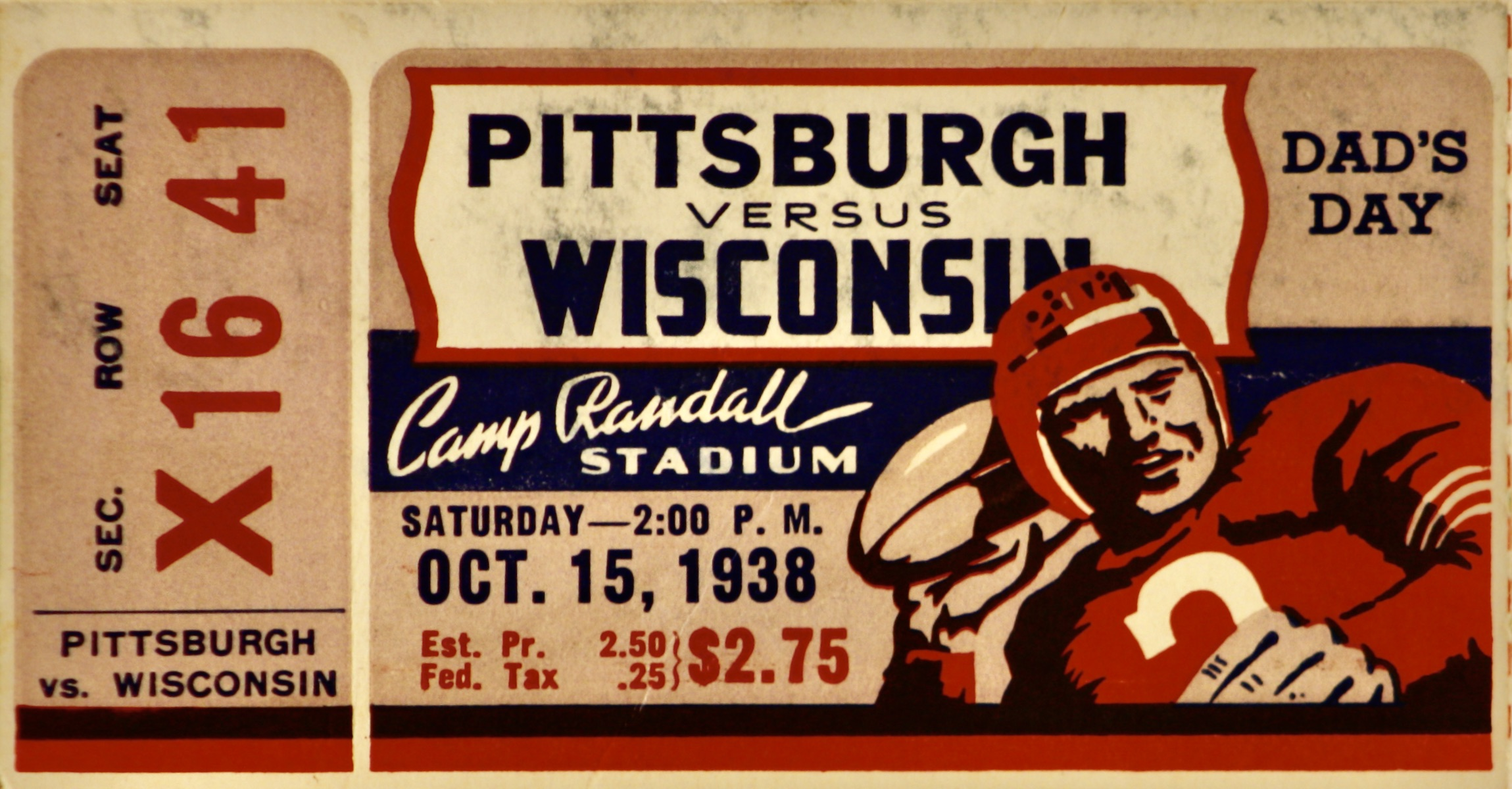
- Ticket to the team's October 15th match versus Pittsburgh.
- Conference: Big Ten Conference
- Record: 5–3 (3–2 Big Ten)
- Head coach: Harry Stuhldreher (3rd season)
- MVP: Howard Weiss
- Captain: Ralph Moeller
- Home stadium: Camp Randall Stadium

1938 Big Ten Conference football standings
	Conf.					Overall
Team	W		L		T	W		L		T
No. 10 Minnesota $	4	–	1	–	0	6	–	2	–	0
No. 16 Michigan	3	–	1	–	1	6	–	1	–	1
Purdue	3	–	1	–	1	5	–	1	–	2
No. 17 Northwestern	2	–	1	–	2	4	–	2	–	2
Wisconsin	3	–	2	–	0	5	–	3	–	0
Ohio State	3	–	2	–	1	4	–	3	–	1
Illinois	2	–	3	–	0	3	–	5	–	0
Iowa	1	–	3	–	1	1	–	6	–	1
Indiana	1	–	4	–	0	1	–	6	–	1
Chicago	0	–	4	–	0	1	–	6	–	1
$ – Conference champion; Rankings from AP Poll

The 1938 Wisconsin Badgers football team was an American football team that represented the University of Wisconsin in the 1938 Big Ten Conference football season. The team compiled a 5–3 record (3–2 against conference opponents) and finished in fifth place in the Big Ten Conference. Harry Stuhldreher was in his third year as Wisconsin's head coach.

Fullback Howard Weiss was selected by the International News Service as a first-team player on the 1938 College Football All-America Team. He also won the Chicago Tribune Silver Football as the most valuable player in the Big Ten. He also finished sixth in the voting for the Heisman Trophy and was also selected as Wisconsin's most valuable player. Ralph Moeller was the team captain. Howard Weiss and center Jack Murray were selected by the Associated Press and United Press as first-team players on the 1938 All-Big Ten Conference football team.

The team played its home games at Camp Randall Stadium, which had a capacity of 36,000. During the 1938 season, the average attendance at home games was 31,731.

== Schedule ==
Date	Opponent	Rank	Site	Result	Attendance	Source
October 1	Marquette*		Camp Randall Stadium; Madison, WI	W 27–0	27,876	
October 8	at Iowa		Iowa Stadium; Iowa City, IA (rivalry)	W 31–13		
October 15	Pittsburgh*		Camp Randall Stadium; Madison, WI	L 6–26		
October 22	at Purdue		Ross–Ade Stadium; West Lafayette, IN	L 7–13	21,000	
October 29	Indiana^{†}		Camp Randall Stadium; Madison, WI	W 6–0		
November 5	at No. 7 Northwestern		Dyche Stadium; Evanston, IL	W 20–13		
November 12	at UCLA*	No. 15	Los Angeles Memorial Coliseum; Los Angeles, CA	W 14–7	35,000	
November 19	Minnesota	No. 12	Camp Randall Stadium; Madison, WI (rivalry)	L 0–21	38,000	
*Non-conference game; ^{†}Homecoming; Rankings from AP Poll released prior to the game
