= 1938 Purdue Boilermakers football team =

American college football season

1938 Purdue Boilermakers football
- Conference: Big Ten Conference
- Record: 5–1–2 (3–1–1 Big Ten)
- Head coach: Mal Elward (2nd season)
- MVP: Joe Mihal
- Captains: Paul Humphrey; Joe Mihal
- Home stadium: Ross–Ade Stadium

1938 Big Ten Conference football standings
	Conf.					Overall
Team	W		L		T	W		L		T
No. 10 Minnesota $	4	–	1	–	0	6	–	2	–	0
No. 16 Michigan	3	–	1	–	1	6	–	1	–	1
Purdue	3	–	1	–	1	5	–	1	–	2
No. 17 Northwestern	2	–	1	–	2	4	–	2	–	2
Wisconsin	3	–	2	–	0	5	–	3	–	0
Ohio State	3	–	2	–	1	4	–	3	–	1
Illinois	2	–	3	–	0	3	–	5	–	0
Iowa	1	–	3	–	1	1	–	6	–	1
Indiana	1	–	4	–	0	1	–	6	–	1
Chicago	0	–	4	–	0	1	–	6	–	1
$ – Conference champion; Rankings from AP Poll

The 1938 Purdue Boilermakers football team was an American football team that represented Purdue University during the 1938 Big Ten Conference football season.Mal In their second season under head coach Mal Elward, the Boilermakers compiled a 5–1–2 record, finished in a tie for second place in the Big Ten Conference with a 3–1–1 record against conference opponents, and outscored opponents by a total of 84 to 38.

== Schedule ==
Date	Opponent	Site	Result	Attendance	Source
September 24	Detroit*	Ross–Ade Stadium; West Lafayette, IN	W 19–6	>24,000	
October 1	at Butler*	Butler Bowl; Indianapolis, IN	W 21–6	18,000	
October 8	at Minnesota	Memorial Stadium; Minneapolis, MN	L 0–7	52,000	
October 15	at Fordham*	Polo Grounds; New York, NY	T 6–6	32,000	
October 22	Wisconsin	Ross–Ade Stadium; West Lafayette, IN	W 13–7	21,000	
October 29	at Iowa	Iowa Stadium; Iowa City, IA	T 0–0	10,000	
November 5	at Ohio State	Ohio Stadium; Columbus, OH	W 12–0	54,365	
November 19	Indiana	Ross–Ade Stadium; West Lafayette, IN (Old Oaken Bucket)	W 13–6	32,000	
*Non-conference game

== Roster ==
- Ray Abbott, E
- Dick Ainslie, FB-C
- Jack Ainsworth, G
- Ted Axton, C
- Howard Bliss, QB
- W. E. Britt, E
- Lou Brock, HB
- Jack Brown, HB
- Mike Byelene, HB
- Frank Bykowski, G
- Leon DeWitte, FB
- Leonard Diehl, G-T
- John Dilts, T
- Ted Hennis, QB
- Paul Humphrey, C
- Tony Ippolito, FB-QB
- LaVerne Johnson, G-T
- Richard Johnson, T
- Tony Juska, FB
- John Krause, E
- Felix Mackiewicz, E
- Jim Maloney, G
- Charles Mann, T-E
- Joe Mihal, T
- Fred Montague, QB
- Augie Morningstar, C
- Jim Nesbitt, HB
- Nate Paulus, E
- Dick Potter, T
- Nate Poulos
- David Rankin, E
- Al Rossi, T
- Allen Shackleton, QB
- George Spehn, E
- John Thursby, E
- Herman Timperman, T
- Galen Van Sant, HB
- Bill Vergane, E-T
- Carl Verplank, G
- Jack Winchell, G
