= 1938 Indiana Hoosiers football team =

American college football season

1938 Indiana Hoosiers football
- Conference: Big Ten Conference
- Record: 1–6–1 (1–4 Big Ten)
- Head coach: Bo McMillin (5th season)
- MVP: Bob Haak
- Captain: Paul Graham
- Home stadium: Memorial Stadium

1938 Big Ten Conference football standings
	Conf.					Overall
Team	W		L		T	W		L		T
No. 10 Minnesota $	4	–	1	–	0	6	–	2	–	0
No. 16 Michigan	3	–	1	–	1	6	–	1	–	1
Purdue	3	–	1	–	1	5	–	1	–	2
No. 17 Northwestern	2	–	1	–	2	4	–	2	–	2
Wisconsin	3	–	2	–	0	5	–	3	–	0
Ohio State	3	–	2	–	1	4	–	3	–	1
Illinois	2	–	3	–	0	3	–	5	–	0
Iowa	1	–	3	–	1	1	–	6	–	1
Indiana	1	–	4	–	0	1	–	6	–	1
Chicago	0	–	4	–	0	1	–	6	–	1
$ – Conference champion; Rankings from AP Poll

The 1938 Indiana Hoosiers football team represented the Indiana Hoosiers in the 1938 Big Ten Conference football season. The participated as members of the Big Ten Conference. The Hoosiers played their home games at Memorial Stadium in Bloomington, Indiana. The team was coached by Bo McMillin, in his fifth year as head coach of the Hoosiers.

== Schedule ==
Date	Opponent	Site	Result	Attendance	Source
October 1	at Ohio State	Ohio Stadium; Columbus, OH	L 0–6	67,397	
October 8	at Illinois	Memorial Stadium; Champaign, IL (rivalry)	L 2–12	15,571	
October 15	at Nebraska*	Memorial Stadium; Lincoln, NE	T 0–0		
October 22	Kansas State*	Memorial Stadium; Bloomington, IN	L 6–13		
October 29	at Wisconsin	Camp Randall Stadium; Madison, WI	L 0–6		
November 5	at Boston College*	Fenway Park; Boston, MA	L 0–14	25,000	
November 12	Iowa	Memorial Stadium; Bloomington, IN	W 7–3		
November 19	at Purdue	Ross–Ade Stadium; West Lafayette, IN (Old Oaken Bucket)	L 6–13	32,000	
*Non-conference game

== 1939 NFL draftees ==
Player	Position	Round	Pick	NFL club
Bob Haak	Tackle	2	15	Brooklyn Dodgers
Frank Petrick	End	10	83	Cleveland Rams
Paul Graham	Back	20	183	Cleveland Rams
