= 1938 Illinois Fighting Illini football team =

American college football season

1938 Illinois Fighting Illini football
- Conference: Big Ten Conference
- Record: 3–5 (2–3 Big Ten)
- Head coach: Robert Zuppke (26th season)
- MVP: James Hodges
- Captain: James W. McDonald
- Home stadium: Memorial Stadium

1938 Big Ten Conference football standings
	Conf.					Overall
Team	W		L		T	W		L		T
No. 10 Minnesota $	4	–	1	–	0	6	–	2	–	0
No. 16 Michigan	3	–	1	–	1	6	–	1	–	1
Purdue	3	–	1	–	1	5	–	1	–	2
No. 17 Northwestern	2	–	1	–	2	4	–	2	–	2
Wisconsin	3	–	2	–	0	5	–	3	–	0
Ohio State	3	–	2	–	1	4	–	3	–	1
Illinois	2	–	3	–	0	3	–	5	–	0
Iowa	1	–	3	–	1	1	–	6	–	1
Indiana	1	–	4	–	0	1	–	6	–	1
Chicago	0	–	4	–	0	1	–	6	–	1
$ – Conference champion; Rankings from AP Poll

The 1938 Illinois Fighting Illini football team was an American football team that represented the University of Illinois during the 1938 Big Ten Conference football season. In their 26th season under head coach Robert Zuppke, the Illini compiled a 3–5 record and finished in seventh place in the Big Ten Conference. Guard James Hodges was selected as the team's most valuable player.

== Schedule ==
Date	Opponent	Site	Result	Attendance	Source
September 24	Ohio*	Memorial Stadium; Champaign, IL	L 0–6	31,378	
October 1	DePaul*	Memorial Stadium; Champaign, IL	W 44–7	11,414	
October 8	Indiana	Memorial Stadium; Champaign, IL (rivalry)	W 12–2	15,571	
October 15	at Notre Dame*	Notre Dame Stadium; Notre Dame, IN	L 6–14	29,142	
October 22	No. 18 Northwestern	Memorial Stadium; Champaign, IL (rivalry)	L 0–13	37,000	
October 29	at No. 13 Michigan	Michigan Stadium; Ann Arbor, MI (rivalry)	L 0–14	43,006	
November 12	Ohio State	Memorial Stadium; Champaign, IL (Illibuck)	L 14–32	18,000	
November 19	at Chicago	Stagg Field; Chicago, IL	W 34–0	5,000–6,000	
*Non-conference game; Rankings from AP Poll released prior to the game
