= 1938 Iowa Hawkeyes football team =

American college football season

1938 Iowa Hawkeyes football
- Conference: Big Ten Conference
- Record: 1–6–1 (1–3–1 Big Ten)
- Head coach: Irl Tubbs (2nd season)
- MVP: Erwin Prasse
- Captain: Jack Eicherly
- Home stadium: Iowa Stadium

1938 Big Ten Conference football standings
	Conf.					Overall
Team	W		L		T	W		L		T
No. 10 Minnesota $	4	–	1	–	0	6	–	2	–	0
No. 16 Michigan	3	–	1	–	1	6	–	1	–	1
Purdue	3	–	1	–	1	5	–	1	–	2
No. 17 Northwestern	2	–	1	–	2	4	–	2	–	2
Wisconsin	3	–	2	–	0	5	–	3	–	0
Ohio State	3	–	2	–	1	4	–	3	–	1
Illinois	2	–	3	–	0	3	–	5	–	0
Iowa	1	–	3	–	1	1	–	6	–	1
Indiana	1	–	4	–	0	1	–	6	–	1
Chicago	0	–	4	–	0	1	–	6	–	1
$ – Conference champion; Rankings from AP Poll

The 1938 Iowa Hawkeyes football team was an American football team that represented the University of Iowa as a member of the Big Ten Conference during the 1938 Big Ten football season. In their second and final year under head coach Irl Tubbs, the Hawkeyes compiled a 1–6–1 record (1–3–1 in conference games), finished in eighth place in the Big Ten, and was outscored by a total of 135 to 46.

The team played its home games at Iowa Stadium (later renamed Kinnick Stadium) in Iowa City, Iowa.

== Schedule ==
Date	Opponent	Site	Result	Attendance	Source
September 23	at UCLA*	Los Angeles Memorial Coliseum; Los Angeles, CA	L 3–27	40,000	
October 8	Wisconsin^{†}	Iowa Stadium; Iowa City, IA (rivalry)	L 13–31		
October 15	at Chicago	Stagg Field; Chicago, IL	W 27–14	4,000	
October 22	Colgate*	Iowa Stadium; Iowa City, Iowa	L 0–14		
October 29	Purdue	Iowa Stadium; Iowa City, IA	T 0–0	10,000	
November 5	at No. 12 Minnesota	Memorial Stadium; Minneapolis, MN (rivalry)	L 0–28	42,000	
November 12	at Indiana	Memorial Stadium; Bloomington, IN	L 3–7		
November 19	Nebraska*	Iowa Stadium; Iowa City, IA (rivalry)	L 0–14		
*Non-conference game; ^{†}Homecoming; Rankings from AP Poll released prior to the game
