= 1938 Northwestern Wildcats football team =

American college football season

1938 Northwestern Wildcats football
- Conference: Big Ten Conference

Ranking
- AP: No. 17
- Record: 4–2–2 (2–1–2 Big Ten)
- Head coach: Pappy Waldorf (4th season)
- Offensive scheme: Single-wing
- MVP: Bob Voigts
- Captain: Cleo Diehl
- Home stadium: Dyche Stadium

1938 Big Ten Conference football standings
	Conf.					Overall
Team	W		L		T	W		L		T
No. 10 Minnesota $	4	–	1	–	0	6	–	2	–	0
No. 16 Michigan	3	–	1	–	1	6	–	1	–	1
Purdue	3	–	1	–	1	5	–	1	–	2
No. 17 Northwestern	2	–	1	–	2	4	–	2	–	2
Wisconsin	3	–	2	–	0	5	–	3	–	0
Ohio State	3	–	2	–	1	4	–	3	–	1
Illinois	2	–	3	–	0	3	–	5	–	0
Iowa	1	–	3	–	1	1	–	6	–	1
Indiana	1	–	4	–	0	1	–	6	–	1
Chicago	0	–	4	–	0	1	–	6	–	1
$ – Conference champion; Rankings from AP Poll

The 1938 Northwestern Wildcats team represented Northwestern University during the 1938 Big Ten Conference football season. In their fifth year under head coach Pappy Waldorf, the Wildcats compiled a 4–2–2 record (2–1–2 against Big Ten Conference opponents) and finished in fourth place in the Big Ten Conference.

== Schedule ==
Date	Opponent	Rank	Site	Result	Attendance	Source
October 1	Kansas State*		Dyche Stadium; Evanston, IL	W 21–0	35,000	
October 8	Drake*		Dyche Stadium; Evanston, IL	W 33–0		
October 15	Ohio State		Dyche Stadium; Evanston, IL	T 0–0	38,000	
October 22	at Illinois	No. 18	Memorial Stadium; Champaign, IL (rivalry)	W 13–0	37,000	
October 29	No. 2 Minnesota	No. 12	Dyche Stadium; Evanston, IL	W 6–3	48,000	
November 5	Wisconsin	No. 7	Dyche Stadium; Evanston, IL	L 13–20		
November 12	at No. 18 Michigan	No. 17	Michigan Stadium; Ann Arbor, MI (rivalry)	T 0–0	71,010	
November 19	No. 1 Notre Dame*	No. 16	Dyche Stadium; Evanston, IL (rivalry)	L 7–9	46,348	
*Non-conference game; Rankings from AP Poll released prior to the game
