= John Brennan (American football) =

American football player (1913–1982)

No. 37
- Position: Guard

Personal information
- Born: September 28, 1913; Racine, Wisconsin, U.S.
- Died: March 1982; South Bend, Indiana, U.S.
- Listed height: 6 ft 1 in (1.85 m)
- Listed weight: 204 lb (93 kg)

Career information
- High school: Chicago (IL) Schurz
- College: Michigan
- NFL draft: 1939: 19th round, 179th overall pick

Career history
- Green Bay Packers (1939)

Awards and highlights
- NFL champion (1939)

Career NFL statistics
- Games played: 2
- Stats at Pro Football Reference

John Carter Brennan (September 28, 1913 – March 1982) was an American professional football player. He played at the guard position for the University of Michigan from 1936 to 1938 and for the Green Bay Packers in 1939.

== Biography ==
=== Early life ===
Brennan was born in Racine, Wisconsin, and attended Carl Schurz High School in the Irving Park neighborhood of Chicago, Illinois. Although he stood six feet, two inches and weighed 200 pounds, he was reportedly "the smallest man in his family in three generations."

=== University of Michigan ===
Brennan enrolled at the University of Michigan in 1935 where he became a member of the school's football and wrestling teams. He played guard for the Michigan Wolverines football teams from 1936 to 1938.

As a sophomore in 1936, Brennan was a starter for Harry Kipke's football team that finished the season with a record of 1–6. At the end of the 1936 season, Brennan sparked a controversy when the Associated Press reported that he responded to a questionnaire about women students by saying that "four out of five co-eds are beautiful, and the fifth one comes to Michigan." The comment led one female Michigan student to reply with a slap at the football team, stating that, "Four out of five men are football players, and the fifth one comes to Michigan."

After the poor showing in 1936, Brennan was one of the players who helped turn the program around in 1938 under new head coach Fritz Crisler. Brennan and All-American Ralph Heikkinen started every game at the two guard positions for the 1938 team—a team that finished with a 6–1–1 record and featured All-Americans Tom Harmon and Forest Evashevski in the backfield.

The controversy over Brennan's comments about Michigan's female students followed him into his senior year. In January 1939, he was voted the "queen" of the university's ice festival. The Associated Press picked up the story, which was printed in newspapers across the United States under headlines such as "Campus Beauty Weighs 201 Pounds and Are Coeds Piqued" and "Step Up and Take a Bow Miss Brennan". The AP story reported on the vote as follows:

"Lantern-jawed John Brennan, 201-pound varsity football player and wrestler, was chosen 'queen' of the University of Michigan ice carnival in a campus outbreak of monkey-shining today. ... Brennan himself started a campus battle two years ago by observing that 'four out of five women are pretty, and the fifth comes to Michigan.' Campus aesthetes described Brennan a clipped blond of the type known as statuesque (reinforced concrete, chiseled with a blow torch)."

Sports columnist, Henry J. McCormick, also picked up the story and wrote that the selection of the football player and heavyweight wrestler as queen of the ice carnival was the result of "skulduggery" in the balloting, which was traced to Brennan's earlier "direct slap at the pulchritude of Michigan's co-eds," a slap that spawned a campus squabble and "made for some very fine reading in the campus newspaper."

=== Professional football ===
Brennan was selected by the Green Bay Packers in the 19th round (179th overall pick) of the 1939 NFL draft. When Brennan signed with the Packers in February 1939, the story was reported under the headline, "'QUEEN' OF MICHIGAN SIGNED BY GREEN BAY". When Brennan showed up at Curly Lambeau's training camp, the press continued to refer to him as "the Michigan 'Ice Queen.'" Although official records indicate that Brennan appeared in only two games for the Packers during the 1939 NFL season, newspaper accounts indicate that he appeared in at least three games—as a starter in the Packers' 31–0 win over the St. Louis Gunners on October 15, 1939, and as a substitute in a 27–20 win over the Chicago Cardinals on October 8, 1939, and a 26–7 win over the Detroit Lions on October 22, 1939. Brennan was released by the Packers in October 1939 and signed with the Kenosha Cardinals of the American Pro Football League. In November 1939, Brennan was added to the Kenosha coaching staff and also continued as a player.

=== Later life ===
Brennan died in 1982 at age 62 while living in Fort Pierce, FL.
