= 1938 Chicago Maroons football team =

American college football season

1938 Chicago Maroons football
- Conference: Big Ten Conference
- Record: 1–6–1 (0–4 Big Ten)
- Head coach: Clark Shaughnessy (6th season)
- MVP: Lew Hamity
- Home stadium: Stagg Field

1938 Big Ten Conference football standings
| | Conf. | | | | | Overall |
| Team | W | | L | | T | W | | L | | T |
|---|---|---|---|---|---|---|---|---|---|---|
| No. 10 Minnesota $ | 4 | – | 1 | – | 0 | 6 | – | 2 | – | 0 |
| No. 16 Michigan | 3 | – | 1 | – | 1 | 6 | – | 1 | – | 1 |
| Purdue | 3 | – | 1 | – | 1 | 5 | – | 1 | – | 2 |
| No. 17 Northwestern | 2 | – | 1 | – | 2 | 4 | – | 2 | – | 2 |
| Wisconsin | 3 | – | 2 | – | 0 | 5 | – | 3 | – | 0 |
| Ohio State | 3 | – | 2 | – | 1 | 4 | – | 3 | – | 1 |
| Illinois | 2 | – | 3 | – | 0 | 3 | – | 5 | – | 0 |
| Iowa | 1 | – | 3 | – | 1 | 1 | – | 6 | – | 1 |
| Indiana | 1 | – | 4 | – | 0 | 1 | – | 6 | – | 1 |
| Chicago | 0 | – | 4 | – | 0 | 1 | – | 6 | – | 1 |
$ – Conference champion; Rankings from AP Poll

The 1938 Chicago Maroons football team was an American football team that represented the University of Chicago during the 1938 Big Ten Conference football season. In their sixth season under head coach Clark Shaughnessy, the Maroons compiled a 1–6–1 record (0–4 against conference opponents), finished in last place in the Big Ten Conference, and were outscored by opponents by a combined total of 241 to 75.

== Schedule ==
| Date | Opponent | Site | Result | Attendance | Source |
|---|---|---|---|---|---|
| October 1 | Bradley Tech* | Stagg Field; Chicago, IL | T 0–0 | 14,000 | |
| October 8 | at Michigan | Michigan Stadium; Ann Arbor, MI (rivalry) | L 7–45 | 25,000 | |
| October 15 | Iowa | Stagg Field; Chicago, IL | L 14–27 | 4,000 | |
| October 22 | at Ohio State | Ohio Stadium; Columbus, OH | L 7–42 | 63,069 | |
| October 29 | DePauw* | Stagg Field; Chicago, IL | W 34–14 | 6,000 | |
| November 5 | at Harvard* | Harvard Stadium; Boston, MA | L 13–47 | 20,000 | |
| November 12 | Pacific (CA)* | Stagg Field; Chicago, IL | L 0–32 | 10,000 | |
| November 19 | Illinois | Stagg Field; Chicago, IL | L 0–34 | 5,000–6,000 | |
*Non-conference game
