= 1938 Ohio State Buckeyes football team =

American college football season

1938 Ohio State Buckeyes football
- Conference: Big Ten Conference
- Record: 4–3–1 (3–2–1 Big Ten)
- Head coach: Francis Schmidt (5th season)
- MVP: Jim Langhurst
- Home stadium: Ohio Stadium

1938 Big Ten Conference football standings
	Conf.					Overall
Team	W		L		T	W		L		T
No. 10 Minnesota $	4	–	1	–	0	6	–	2	–	0
No. 16 Michigan	3	–	1	–	1	6	–	1	–	1
Purdue	3	–	1	–	1	5	–	1	–	2
No. 17 Northwestern	2	–	1	–	2	4	–	2	–	2
Wisconsin	3	–	2	–	0	5	–	3	–	0
Ohio State	3	–	2	–	1	4	–	3	–	1
Illinois	2	–	3	–	0	3	–	5	–	0
Iowa	1	–	3	–	1	1	–	6	–	1
Indiana	1	–	4	–	0	1	–	6	–	1
Chicago	0	–	4	–	0	1	–	6	–	1
$ – Conference champion; Rankings from AP Poll

The 1938 Ohio State Buckeyes football team represented Ohio State University in the 1938 Big Ten Conference football season. The Buckeyes compiled a 4–3–1 record and outscored opponents 119–65.

== Schedule ==
Date	Opponent	Rank	Site	Result	Attendance	Source
October 1	Indiana		Ohio Stadium; Columbus, OH	W 6–0	67,397	
October 8	USC*		Ohio Stadium; Columbus, OH	L 7–14	62,578	
October 15	at No. 18 Northwestern		Dyche Stadium; Evanston, IL	T 0–0	38,000	
October 22	Chicago		Ohio Stadium; Columbus, OH	W 42–7	63,069	
October 29	at NYU*	No. 20	Polo Grounds; New York, NY	W 32–0	20,000	
November 5	Purdue		Ohio Stadium; Columbus, OH	L 0–12	54,365	
November 12	at Illinois		Memorial Stadium; Champaign, IL (Illibuck)	W 32–14	18,000	
November 19	No. 17 Michigan		Ohio Stadium; Columbus, OH (rivalry)	L 0–18	64,413	
*Non-conference game; Rankings from AP Poll released prior to the game

== Coaching staff ==
- Francis Schmidt, head coach, fifth year

== 1939 NFL draftees ==
Player	Round	Pick	Position	NFL club
Alex Schoenbaum	7	55	Tackle	Brooklyn Dodgers
Carl Kaplanoff	12	109	Guard	Brooklyn Dodgers
Joe Aleskus	14	124	Tackle	Philadelphia Eagles
