= Paul Humphrey (American football) =

American football player (1917–2006)

No. 16, 57
- Position: Center

Personal information
- Born: July 18, 1917; Terre Haute, Indiana, U.S.
- Died: June 22, 2006 (aged 88); Terre Haute, Indiana, U.S.
- Listed height: 6 ft 0 in (1.83 m)
- Listed weight: 210 lb (95 kg)

Career information
- High school: Garfield (Terre Haute)
- College: Purdue (1935-1938)
- NFL draft: 1939: 11th round, 94th overall pick

Career history
- Brooklyn Dodgers (1939); Milwaukee Chiefs (1940-1941)

Career NFL statistics
- Games played: 11
- Games started: 1
- Stats at Pro Football Reference

Paul Eugene Humphrey (July 18, 1917 – June 22, 2006) was an American professional football center who played professionally in the National Football League (NFL). He was drafted in the 11th round of the 1939 NFL draft by the Philadelphia Eagles and played that season with the Brooklyn Dodgers. Later he played with the Milwaukee Chiefs of the American Football League (AFL).
