= Fred Janke =

American politician

- Fred Janke, 1938

No. 66 – Michigan Wolverines
- Positions: Tackle, Fullback

Personal information
- Born: April 28, 1917
- Died: January 24, 2009 (aged 91); Jackson, Michigan, U.S.
- Listed height: 6 ft 1 in (1.85 m)
- Listed weight: 205 lb (93 kg)

Career information
- High school: Jackson High School (Jackson, Michigan)
- College: Michigan

Career history
- 1936–1938: Michigan

Awards and highlights
- Captain, 1938 Michigan football team Mayor, Jackson, Michigan, 1976–1979

Fred C. Janke (pronounced yonkee) (April 28, 1917 – January 24, 2009) was an American football player, business executive and politician. He played football for the University of Michigan from 1936 to 1938 and was the captain of the 1938 Michigan Wolverines football team under first-year head coach Fritz Crisler. He later became the president and chairman of the board of Hancock Industries. He also served as the mayor his hometown, Jackson, Michigan, in the 1970s.

== Early life ==
Janke as born in Jackson, Michigan in 1917. He played football at Jackson High School, and was selected as an all-state tackle in 1933 and 1934.

== University of Michigan ==
In 1935, Janke enrolled at the University of Michigan, where he studied geological engineering. He played at the tackle position for the Michigan Wolverines football team from 1936 to 1938. At the start of the 1937 season, Michigan head coach Harry Kipke moved Janke from the tackle position to fullback, but Janke returned to the tackle position by early October 1937. Despite injuries that resulted in his missing parts of the 1936, 1937, and 1938 seasons, Janke was chosen as the captain of the 1938 Michigan Wolverines football team, the first Michigan football team coached by Fritz Crisler. As Janke played through his injuries, Crisler called him "the ideal team leader." Writing for the Detroit Free Press, former Michigan quarterback Tod Rockwell credited Janke and Tom Harmon with creating a winning team under new line coach Biggie Munn. Rockwell wrote, "Janke belleves that no job on the team is as important as his. He is determined to be the best football player on the squad. He is fully cognizant of the responsibilities of a captain. Janke is entitled to full credit for his part in adding to the momentum of that football pendulum directed by Munn."

== Later life ==
After graduating from Michigan in 1939, Janke taught at Jackson High School and served as an assistant coach there. He also coached football at St. John High School in Jackson. Janke enlisted in the U.S. Navy during World War II and was stationed in the Philippines.

After the war, Janke returned to coaching at St. John's High School in Jackson. He later took a job at Macklin Grinding Wheels. He would up his careers at Hancock Industries (later ITT Hancock Industries), where he became president and chairman of the board.

He served as the mayor of Jackson, Michigan from 1976 to 1979. He died in January 2009 at age 91.
