= Bob Haak (American football) =

American football player (1916–1992)

No. 19
- Positions: Guard, Tackle

Personal information
- Born: March 26, 1916; Hammond, Indiana, U.S.
- Died: November 1, 1992 (aged 76); Bloomington, Indiana, U.S.
- Listed height: 6 ft 1 in (1.85 m)
- Listed weight: 245 lb (111 kg)

Career information
- High school: Hammond
- College: Indiana (1935-1938)
- NFL draft: 1939: 2nd round, 15th overall pick

Career history
- Brooklyn Dodgers (1939)

Awards and highlights
- 2× First-team All-Big Ten (1937, 1938)

Career NFL statistics
- Games played: 10
- Games started: 6
- Stats at Pro Football Reference

Robert Ally Haak (March 26, 1916 – November 1, 1992) was an American professional football player.

== Early life ==
Haak graduated from Hammond High School in Hammond, Indiana where he was a two-time state champion heavy-weight wrestler and an all-conference tackle. He went on to Indiana University where he was a member of the football team, wrestling team, and Sigma Pi fraternity. In 1937, he placed third in the Unlimited division at the NCAA Wrestling championships. During his senior year at Indiana he was named to the all-Big Ten team and played in the 1939 Blue–Gray Football Classic All-Star game. He earned his Bachelor of Science degree in Education.

== Pro career ==
Haak was drafted in the second round of the 1939 NFL Draft. He played Guard and Tackle for the Brooklyn Dodgers in 1939.

== Professional life ==
After leaving the NFL he spent 1940 as the line coach for the Indiana Hoosiers freshmen football team.

In later life he owned the distributing company Best Beers of Bloomington.

He was inducted into the Indiana Wrestling Hall of Fame in 1970 and into the Indiana Football Hall of Fame in 1976.
