= Frank Twedell =

American football player (1917–1969)

No. 62
- Position: Guard

Personal information
- Born: May 29, 1917; Austin, Minnesota, U.S.
- Died: May 14, 1969 (aged 51); Madison, Wisconsin, U.S.
- Listed height: 5 ft 11 in (1.80 m)
- Listed weight: 220 lb (100 kg)

Career information
- High school: Austin
- College: Minnesota
- NFL draft: 1939: 7th round, 59th overall pick

Career history
- Green Bay Packers (1939)

Awards and highlights
- NFL champion (1939); National champion (1936); First-team All-American (1938); Second-team All-American (1937); 2× First-team All-Big Ten (1937, 1938)

Career NFL statistics
- Games played: 4
- Stats at Pro Football Reference

Francis Adolph Twedell (May 29, 1917 – May 14, 1969) was an American professional football player who was a guard for the Green Bay Packers of the National Football League (NFL). He played college football for the Minnesota Golden Gophers, earning first-team All-American honors in 1938. He was selected by the Green Bay Packers in the seventh round of the 1939 NFL draft and played with the team that season.
