= Dave Strong =

Biographical details
- Born: 1916; Mount Vernon, Washington, U.S.
- Died: March 25, 1993 (aged 76–77); Ukiah, California, U.S.

Playing career

Football
- 1936: Illinois
- 1937–1939: Michigan
- Positions: Halfback, quarterback

Coaching career (HC unless noted)

Football
- 1941: South Dakota Mines
- 1945: Nebraska (backfield)
- 1946: Albright
- 1947–1948: Whitman
- c. 1950: Texas (assistant)
- 1951–1952: UCLA (backfield)
- 1954–1956: Sacramento State

Basketball
- 1941–1942: South Dakota Mines

Administrative career (AD unless noted)
- 1947–1948: Whitman

Head coaching record
- Overall: 15–37–3 (football); 11–7 (basketball)

David Arthur "Finky" Strong (1916 – March 25, 1993) was an American football player, coach of football and basketball, and college athletics administrator. He served as the head football coach at the South Dakota School of Mines and Technology (1941), Albright College (1946), Whitman College (1947–1948), and California State University, Sacramento (1954–1956). He was the head basketball coach at South Dakota Mines for one season, in 1941–42. While at Whitman, he also served as the school's athletic director.

Strong was born in Mount Vernon, Washington. He spent his childhood in Seattle, Spokane, Washington, Yakima, Washington, and Helena, Montana. He played college football at the University of Illinois at Urbana–Champaign and the University of Michigan. Strong died from a heart attack while playing tennis in 1993.

== Head coaching record ==
=== Football ===
Year	Team	Overall	Conference	Standing	Bowl/playoffs
South Dakota Mines Hardrockers (South Dakota Intercollegiate Conference) (1941)
1941	South Dakota Mines	4–2–1	2–1		
South Dakota Mines:		4–2–1	2–1		
Albright Lions (Independent) (1946)
1946	Albright	1–7			
Albright:		1–7			
Whitman Fighting Missionaries (Northwest Conference) (1947–1948)
1947	Whitman	1–6–1	1–5	6th	
1948	Whitman	4–4–1	2–3–1	5th	
Whitman:		5–10–1	3–8–1		
Sacramento State Hornets (Far Western Conference) (1954–1956)
1954	Sacramento State	0–7	0–5	7th	
1955	Sacramento State	2–6	0–5	6th	
1956	Sacramento State	3–5–1	1–4	5th	
Sacramento State:		5–18–1	1–14		
Total:		15–37–3			
