= Hercules Renda =

American football player and coach (1917–2005)

- Renda cropped from 1939 Michigan team photograph

Biographical details
- Born: September 5, 1917
- Died: October 12, 2005 (aged 88)

Playing career
- 1937–1939: Michigan
- Position: Halfback

Coaching career (HC unless noted)
- 1940–1941: Michigan (assistant)

Hercules Gennaro Renda (September 5, 1917 – October 12, 2005) was an American football player and coach. He played for the University of Michigan football team from 1937 to 1939. He was an assistant football coach at Michigan under Fritz Crisler from 1940 to 1941. He later served as a high school football and track coach in Pontiac, Michigan for many years and was inducted into the Michigan High School Coaches Hall of Fame.

== Early years ==
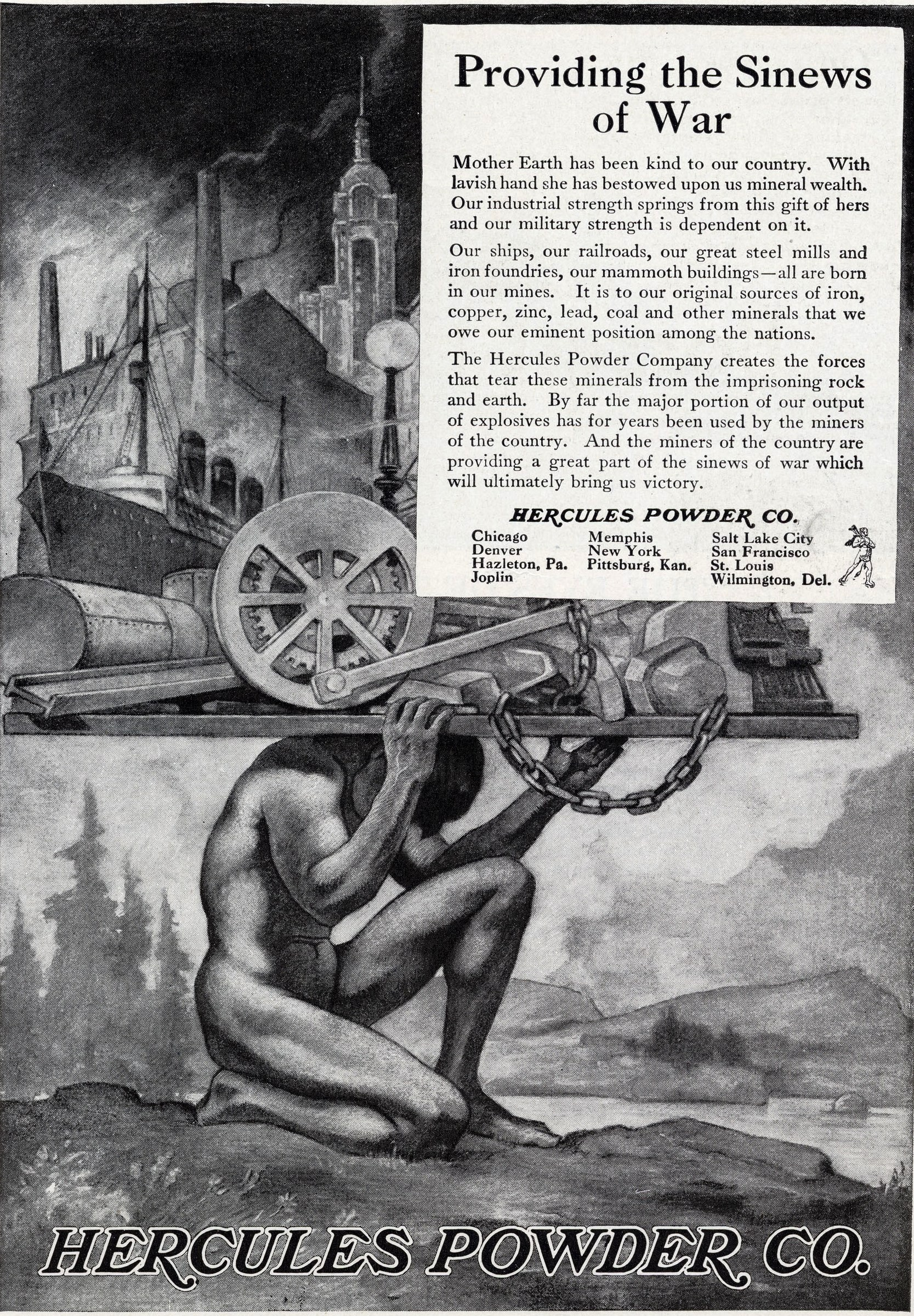
Renda was named after Hercules Powder, depicted here in a 1918 advertisement.

A native of West Virginia born to Italian immigrant parents, Renda grew up in Cabin Creek in the state's coal country. He was named after a brand of mining dynamite ("Hercules Dynamite" and "Hercules Powder") that was popular among West Virginia coal miners at the time.

Renda became a star athlete at East Bank High School in East Bank, West Virginia. During the summers, he worked as a "tippler" at the coal mine. During the school year, he played basketball and football and ran the dash and low hurdles for the track team. He was badly injured in a high school basketball game when he was "bumped while in the air with both feet off the floor and landed on his head." Renda later said that five weeks in the hospital taught him that football was the best and safest sport after all.

As a high school senior in 1935, Renda drew attention from the West Virginia press for his skill as a running back. The state's leading newspaper, the Charleston Gazette wrote in October 1935: "In Hercules Renda, East Bank will show its greatest running back of all time. Renda has scored 11 times for East Bank this year and his runs have varied from 10 to 95 yards." In November 1935, the Gazette called him "stocky Hercules Renda, a fast stepping but nevertheless rugged halfback, who has been running wild all season." (Twenty years later, NBA Hall of Famer Jerry West attended East Bank High; West was nicknamed "Zeke from Cabin Creek".)

== University of Michigan ==
Two University of Michigan alumni, Lon Barringer and Rocco Gorman, recruited Renda and his high school teammate, Joe Savilla, to play football for the Michigan Wolverines. Renda and Savilla both enrolled at the University of Michigan. The Michigan Daily depicted the two West Virginia recruits as something of an odd pair—Renda was a 5-foot, 4 inch halfback, and Savilla was a 6-foot, 4 inch tackle. Despite his small size (5 feet 4 inches and 152 pounds), Renda played for Michigan's freshman team in 1936 and for the varsity team from 1937 to 1939. His performance on the freshman team in 1936 was summed up as follows: "On the offense he runs like a frightened deer and is deathly with his tackles while on defense."

After one of his first games in 1937, the Michigan Alumnus wrote:

"And once more Michigan has a colorful football hero. Little Hercules Renda, five feet four inches 'tall' and 152 pounds of relentless energy, ran, squirmed and tackled his way into the hearts of thousands on thousands of Wolverine rooters whose frenzied cheers welcomed his first great touchdown catch and plunge, and warmed excitedly to his never-ceasing battling. Renda never stopped. ... Michigan took little Hercules Renda to its heart last Saturday and, unless all signs are wrong, this midget from the hills of West Virginia will write his name high in the Wolverine athletic annals."

Press coverage of Renda often focused on his short stature, and often referred to him as the "midget" from West Virginia. An Associated Press story in 1937 reported that Renda was "just about the shortest first-string football player in the U.S." but noted that he "travels with the power of a tank."

Michigan coach Fritz Crisler called Renda the "greatest football player in America for his height." During the 1938 and 1939 seasons, Renda saw limited action, as Michigan had Forest Evashevski and Tom Harmon in the backfield. He became principally a blocking back in the 1938 and 1939 seasons. At the time of his death in 2005, the University of Michigan issued a press release stating, "Renda may have been one of the shortest football players in U-M history, standing only 5-3, but his speed and quickness plus his 17-inch calves made him an extremely tough running back to tackle."

== Assistant coach under Crisler ==
After graduating from Michigan, Renda was hired as an assistant football coach at Michigan. He served as an assistant coach under Fritz Crisler during the 1940 and 1941 seasons. Michigan finished with a record of 13 wins, 2 losses and 1 tie during Renda's two seasons as an assistant coach.

== World War II ==
With the entry of the United States into World War II, Renda joined the U.S. Army and reported to Fort Custer Training Center in December 1942. In June 1942, he was transferred to the U.S. Army Air Corps and sent to Miami, Florida, for training as an officer and physical instructor.

== High school coaching career ==
After the war, Renda had a long career as a high school football coach. He coached at Flint Central High School. From 1948 to 1951, he was the head football coach at Pontiac High School in Pontiac, Michigan. Renda's teams won 18 games, lost 25 and tied 2 during his five years at Pontiac High School. Renda told reporters in March 1953 that he had been fired by the school board for objecting to its "win-or-else" policy. Renda later returned to the Pontiac schools as head track coach and assistant football coach at Pontiac Northern High School until his retirement in 1982. He was inducted into the Michigan High School Coaches Hall of Fame.

Renda died in October 2005 at age 88 while taking his daily walk on the track at Pontiac Northern High School. A few years after his death in 2005, a local paper wrote: "Herk spent more than five decades in Pontiac helping students as a coach, administrator and just being the ultimate good neighbor. Since his passing a couple years ago, the world hasn't quite been as good a place. Everybody who knew Herk will tell you that."
