= Paul Kromer =

American football player (1917–2008)

Profile
- Position: Halfback

Personal information
- Born: September 24, 1917; Lorain, Ohio, U.S.
- Died: February 8, 2008 (aged 90); Largo, Florida, U.S.

Career information
- High school: The Kiski School
- College: Michigan

Paul S. Kromer (September 24, 1917 – February 8, 2008) was an American football player. A native of Lorain, Ohio, Kromer enrolled at the University of Michigan where he played halfback for the Michigan Wolverines football teams from 1938 to 1927. With Kromer at left halfback and Tom Harmon at right halfback, Michigan's backfield pair became known in 1938 as the "Touchdown Twins."

== Early life ==
Kromer was born in Lorain, Ohio, in approximately 1917. His father, Frank T. Kromer, was an Ohio native and a motorman for an electric railway. His mother, Olive Kromer, was also an Ohio native. He attended The Kiski School, a private preparatory school in Saltsburg, Pennsylvania. Kromer became a highly regarded football player at Kiski. In October 1930, he scored a touchdown to give Kiski a 7–0 win over the Penn State freshman football team. He had outstanding speed as a teenager, and was beaten by only one foot in a 100-yard dash against Jesse Owens when he was 16 years old. Kromer could run the 100-yard dash in 9.9 seconds. In December 1936, he announced that he would enroll at the University of Michigan.

== University of Michigan ==
Kromer enrolled at the University of Michigan in 1937. He came to Michigan as a heralded football star from Ohio. As a freshman in 1937, Kromer played for Michigan's All-Freshman football team.

As a sophomore, Kromer was given jersey No. 83, the number assigned to one of Michigan's famed plays, and played left halfback for the 1938 Michigan Wolverines football team. He became known as the "Lorain tornado." Under first-year head coach Fritz Crisler, the 1938 Wolverines finished with a 6–1–1 record and outscored opponents 131 to 40. Crisler called sophomores Tom Harmon and Kromer "the finest halfbacking combination he has ever coached." Crisler called Kromer "the more instinctive runner of the two." Harmon and Kromer did much of the ball-carrying for Michigan in 1938, and some observers recalled that "Paul probably played as well, if not better, than Harmon." A profile of Harmon and Kromer noted: "Kromer, 5 feet 10 and 160 pounds, is just the opposite. He's the shifty type the kind who'll give you a leg and take it away while you're grabbing at thin air. ... He's just as fast as Harmon and equally able on the pitching end of the pigskin." The backfield duo of Kromer and Harmon gave the Michigan offense a spark in 1938, as the two became known as the "Touchdown Twins." The Michigan Alumnus in November 1940 recalled the efforts of Kromer and Harmon: "In that season of two years ago two boys flashed brilliantly across the gridiron horizon. Tom Harmon and Paul Kromer, Sophomores, halfbacks, teamed to give to Michigan the promise of the greatest backfield combination in football history."

As a junior in 1937, Kromer was injured in the first game of the season with the result that "his football effectiveness was over" for the 1939 season. He started only three games during the 1940 season. Kromer left school for a time in the fall of 1939 after suffering his injury. His departure led to speculation in the national media that he was leaving the Michigan football team, but he returned in late November and said he had gone home to get some money from his parents.

Kromer announced in the spring of 1940 that he intended to retire from active competition due to the knee injury he sustained in the 1939 season opener. However, Kromer did return to football during the 1940 season. Though his playing time was limited, Kromer had the most spectacular play of his career in the final game of the 1940 season, Kromer's final appearance with the Michigan Wolverines. Playing against Ohio State in Columbus, Ohio, Kromer got the start at left halfback. He returned a punt 80 yards for a touchdown in the first quarter, as the Wolverines shut out the Buckeyes 40 to 0. The 1940 Michigan team finished the season with a 7–1 record and was ranked No. 3 in the final Associated Press poll. The Michigan Alumnus described Kromer's run as follows: "He grabbed Scott's fine punt on his own 20-yard line, feinted to the left and then cut over toward the center of the field. Harmon spilled the nearest Buckeye with a strenuous block and Rogers put another one out of action. Kolesar swung into action and two more Buckeyes went out of action. Wistert disposed of another — and then it was just a case of Kromer's outrunning the hopelessly pursuing remainder. Though lacking about fifty percent of his old speed and agility, Kromer sped down the side of the field and over for the score — the climax of his Varsity career." The 1941 Michiganensian called him "the touchdown twin who came back despite a gelatin knee."

== Military service and professional football ==
In June 1941, Kromer joined the United States Navy and was appointed as an aviation cadet. He was assigned to the athletic office at the Naval Air Station in Pensacola, Florida. He suffered a broken neck in an automobile accident near Tupelo, Mississippi, on Christmas Eve 1941, and was hospitalized at the Marine Corps hospital at Memphis, Tennessee. In 1942, he was assigned to the Navy's inactive list because of the injuries he sustained in the accident.

In June 1943, he was signed to play professional football for the Detroit Lions. At the end of August 1943, Lions head coach Gus Dorais placed Kromer on the team's reserve squad.

== Later life ==
Kromer lived in his later years in Pinellas County, Florida, at 787 Crescent Drive, Largo, Florida. He died at Largo, Florida, at age 90 in 2008.
