= Howard Weiss =

American football player (1917–1997)

No. 5, 34
- Position: Fullback

Personal information
- Born: October 12, 1917; Fort Atkinson, Wisconsin, U.S.
- Died: November 12, 1997 (aged 80); Milwaukee, Wisconsin, U.S.
- Listed height: 6 ft 0 in (1.83 m)
- Listed weight: 210 lb (95 kg)

Career information
- High school: Fort Atkinson
- College: Wisconsin (1935-1938)
- NFL draft: 1939: 3rd round, 22nd overall pick

Career history

Playing
- Detroit Lions (1939–1940); Milwaukee Chiefs (1941)

Coaching
- Milwaukee Chiefs (1941) Backs coach

Awards and highlights
- Third-team All-American (1938); Chicago Tribune Silver Football (1938); First-team All-Big Ten (1938)

Career NFL statistics
- Rushing yards: 448
- Rushing average: 3.9
- Receptions: 8
- Receiving yards: 81
- Total touchdowns: 4
- Stats at Pro Football Reference

Howard William Weiss (October 12, 1917 – November 12, 1997) was an American professional football fullback. He was drafted in the third round of the 1939 NFL draft by the Detroit Lions and played two seasons with the team. Later he played with the Milwaukee Chiefs of the American Football League (AFL).

A three-sport letter winner in high school, he led the football team to its first conference championship while outscoring its opponents 208–12 during the year. He won the state junior golf championship in 1934. In 1935 Weiss enrolled at the University of Wisconsin–Madison and joined the Wisconsin Badgers football team as a fullback. He was named Wisconsin's Most Valuable Player in 1937 and again in 1938 when he also was awarded the Chicago Tribune Silver Football, given to the Big Ten Conference's Most Valuable Player. He was the first Badger to win the award. In the 1938 Heisman Trophy balloting Weiss came in sixth. He was elected class president for the 1938-–9 school year. Weiss graduated in June 1939 with a degree in economics.

After a stint in the Navy during World War II, Weiss settled in Milwaukee, Wisconsin to begin a career in insurance. At the age of 39 he was named president of the Roberts Company, one of Wisconsin's oldest and largest insurance companies. Weiss and his wife Geraldine involved themselves with Milwaukee's civic affairs, donating their time and money to the Milwaukee Boys Club, the United Way, and the Milwaukee Art Museum.

Weiss was one of 35 charter members named to the UW Athletic Hall of Fame in 1991.
