= Danny Smick =

American basketball and baseball player (1915–1975)

Personal information
- Born: December 24, 1915 Olyphant, Pennsylvania, U.S.
- Died: April 6, 1975 (aged 59) Caseville, Michigan, U.S.
- Listed height: 6 ft 5 in (1.96 m)
- Listed weight: 215 lb (98 kg)

Career information
- High school: Hazel Park (Hazel Park, Michigan)
- College: Michigan (1936–1939)
- Playing career: 1934–1948
- Position: Power forward / center

Career history
- 1934–1935: Jaglowicz Giants
- 1941–1942: Auto Club Detroit
- 1942–1943: Jaglowicz Giants
- 1942–1947: Midland Dow Chemical
- 1947–1948: Flint Dow A.C.'s

Daniel Smick (December 24, 1915 – April 6, 1975) was an American professional basketball and minor league baseball player. In basketball, Smick played primarily for amateur and semi-professional teams, but did spend one season in National Basketball League (1947–48) playing for the Flint Dow A.C.'s. In baseball, he competed for the Bloomington Bloomers, Tarboro Serpents/Goobers, Wausau Timberjacks, and Lansing Senators between 1939 and 1941.

Smick played football, basketball, and baseball at the University of Michigan.
