= Ralph Heikkinen =

American football player (1917–1990)

No. 4
- Position: Guard

Personal information
- Born: May 14, 1917; Hancock, Michigan, U.S.
- Died: January 11, 1990 (aged 72); Pontiac, Michigan, U.S.
- Listed height: 5 ft 10 in (1.78 m)
- Listed weight: 180 lb (82 kg)

Career information
- College: Michigan
- NFL draft: 1939: 12th round, 105th overall pick

Career history
- Brooklyn Dodgers (1939)

Awards and highlights
- Unanimous All-American (1938); 2× First-team All-Big Ten (1937, 1938); Most Valuable Player on Michigan Wolverines, 1937 and 1938

Career NFL statistics
- Games played: 3
- Stats at Pro Football Reference

Ralph Isaac "Hike" Heikkinen (May 14, 1917 – January 12, 1990) was an American college football player who was a guard for the Michigan Wolverines from 1936 to 1938. He was a unanimous All-American in 1938, the first player from the Gogebic Range area of Michigan's Upper Peninsula to win the honor. His exploits were widely reported in the Upper Peninsula press, where he became a local hero. He played professional football in the National Football League (NFL) with the Brooklyn Dodgers in 1939.

From 1940 to 1944, he was the line coach for the Virginia Cavaliers football team while attending the University of Virginia School of Law at the same time. After practicing law in New York for a time, he spent a year as a line coach and law professor at Marquette University in 1947. After leaving Marquette, Heikkinen worked as executive secretary and attorney for Studebaker-Packard Corporation. He later joined the legal staff at General Motors (GM), retiring in 1978 after 20 years of service in GM's legal department. Heikkinen also helped initiate and implement a corporation-wide alcohol treatment and education program at General Motors.

== Youth in the Upper Peninsula ==
Born in Hancock, Michigan, in Michigan's Upper Peninsula, Heikkinen was the son of Finnish immigrants. He grew up in Ramsay, Michigan, a heavily Finnish American community in the Gogebic Range area. Heikkinen's father, Jacob Heikkinen, was a "noted organist" who played at St. Paul's Finnish Lutheran Church.

He attended A.D. Johnston High School, in Bessemer, Michigan, from 1933 to 1935. As a junior in 1933, Heikkinen was elected president of the student council. Heikkinen was a superior student who graduated with high honors student, and finished third in his high school class academically. When a new library opened in Bessemer in 1934, Heikkinen was the first person to check out a book, A.B. De Mille's Three English Comedies. He was also an officer in the school's ROTC program, and received honors for his participation in the high school's military, athletics and student affairs programs.

Despite weighing only 145 pounds (66 kg; 10 st 5 lb), Heikkinen won a spot on his high school football team; his high school coach Robert Reihsen said he won a spot due to his aggressive play. Local papers reported that Heikkinen's line play during high school was marked by hard tackling and blocking. During his junior season in 1934, Coach Reihsen recalled Heikkinen played every minute of every game. Coach Reihnsen's team was known as the "Speed Boys," and gave up only two points in the first four games, outscoring opponents, 65–2. In November 1934, Coach Reihsen took Heikkinen to Minneapolis to attend his first Big Ten football game, the Little Brown Jug match between Michigan and Minnesota. Reihsen recalled that, after the game, Heikkinen said: "Some day I'm going to play in this stadium."

== University of Michigan ==
=== Heikkinen won an academic scholarship ===
In July 1935, Heikkinen won an academic scholarship to the University of Michigan. The Bessemer Herald noted: "It was no surprise to learn that Ralph Heikkinen of Ramsay has been awarded a University of Michigan Alumni scholarship, although only 50 high school seniors in the state can win the honor each year . . . Ralph is a very good student; he ranked third in scholastic standings in a class of 128 . . . Heikkinen was also an outstanding guard on the B.H.S. football team for two years and he intends to try out for the Wolverine freshman squad this fall." The scholarship was renewed from year to year and covered Heikkinen's tuition.

To supplement his income, Heikkinen worked eight-hour days in a Fort Dearborn plant during his freshman year. The president of the Gogebic Range U-M Alumni Club later recalled that Heikkinen won his scholarship by passing a competitive examination. Of those receiving scholarships, Heikkinen was credited with the finest all around record of any undergraduate among the alumni scholarship students.

=== Heikkinen's diminutive stature ===
When Heikkinen graduated from high school, he weighed only 155 pounds (70 kg; 11.1 st) and was thought too light to play Big Ten football. His height was reported variously as 5 feet 8 inches (1.73 m), 5 feet 9 inches (1.75 m), and 5 feet 10 inches (1.78 m). Heikkinen was described by the Detroit News as a "pigmy" compared to Michigan's last great guard, Albert Benbrook, who was 6 feet 6 inches (1.98 m) and more than 250 pounds (110 kg; 18 st). He was also described as "the stock atom," and the "pint-sized" lineman. But Heikkinen viewed his size as an asset: "My size had been a help rather than a hindrance. It is easier for a small man to pull out of the line and run interference than a big one. I had no trouble out-charging big men; it was the small men who gave me all the trouble."

=== Freshman and sophomore years ===
Heikkinen did not excel on the freshman team, but was invited by Coach Harry Kipke to spring practice in 1936 to try out for the varsity team. In April 1936, the people back in Bessemer gave Heikkinen a vote of confidence; the school board approved a $55 payment to Heikkinen as "advance payment" for some form of employment to be given "during the coming summer months."

However, Heikkinen did not win a starting spot on the 1936 team and was not even ranked among the top sophomore guards on the team. At the end of the 1936 season, the highest praise Coach Kipke could muster was to call him "one of the better defensive linemen on the squad." Assistant coach Bennie Oosterbaan said Heikkinen had "the right attitude," and coach Wally Weber described him as "a hard worker." However, the Michigan Daily noted: "The only weakness of the Ramsay boy is his lack of speed. Speedy guards are needed to pull out of the line and lead the interference, and Heikkinen hasn't quite shown that he is fast enough to move in Big Ten competition as yet."

=== Role of Hunk Anderson ===
The first person on the Michigan staff to believe in Heikkinen was Heartley Anderson. A fellow native of the Upper Peninsula (Tamarack City, Michigan), Anderson played guard at Notre Dame from 1919 to 1921 and was Knute Rockne's successor as Notre Dame's head coach in 1931. In 1937, Anderson became Michigan's line coach, and came to the conclusion during spring practice that Heikkinen was Michigan's best football player. After a strong showing in spring practice, Heikkinen "hardened up" over the summer working at the Wakefield Iron.

=== 1937 season ===
In 1937, Heikkinen won the starting job at right guard, but the team finished 4–4, and were outscored by opponents 110–54. They were soundly defeated by Minnesota, 39–6, and Ohio State, 21–0.

Heikkinen was the one bright spot in the Wolverines' 1937 season. In early November 1937, Anderson described Heikkinen as "the smallest but best lineman in the Michigan forward wall." Anderson continued in his praise for Heikkinen: "Heik has shown the stuff in both of our tough games against Minnesota and Northwestern . . . Minnesota didn't split our guards more than twice during the game. Heik was responsible for a lot of that. My conception of a good guard is one that stops anything that comes his way on defense and leads the blocking on offense. Heik has done just that. When we have the ball he is our fifth man in the backfield. He pulls out most of our plays and bowls over the opposition. We have made most of the gains through the line over his position."

Heikkinen's interception of a forward pass proved to be the key break in a 7–0 win over Penn. He also blocked kicks for points after touchdown in one-point wins over Illinois (7–6) and Chicago (13–12). Without Heikkinen's big plays against Penn, Illinois and Chicago, the Wolverines likely would have been 1–5–2 instead of 4–4. Even in a 21–0 loss to Ohio State, Heikkinen blocked two kicks.

Described at the end of the season as Kipke's "pride and joy," Heikkinen averaged 50 minutes a game in 1937, and was the only Michigan player selected to the All-Big Ten team (UP first team; AP second team). He was also voted by his teammates as the team's Most Valuable Player, an honor never before bestowed on a junior. And Anderson noted, "if Michigan's record had been better, Heikkinen would have made the All-America. There isn't a better guard in the country; I don't know another as good. Wait til next year."

A Detroit newspaper wrote that Heikkinen was the surprise of the 1937 season. "Heikkinen has no spectacular record as a high school player to show. He was a reserve guard last season and really just started to show up in spring practice this year." The Bessemer Herald reported on the impressive turnaround of the first player from the Gogebic Range to be named All-Big Ten: "Heikkinen, one of the quietest and least boisterous men on the Michigan grid squad, has suddenly shot from obscurity into the Western Conference hall of fame . . . From a lowly bench warmer last year, 'Hike' became one of the most consistent first-stringers this season. He played many if not more minutes than any other member of the squad."

After the team's 4–4 finish, Michigan dismissed Harry Kipke as head coach. Anderson, described by Heikkinen as the "greatest line technician in football today," also resigned as line coach. Asked about rumors that players did not like Kipke, Heikkinen said those reports were probably originated by disgruntled players who did not make the squad or were in other ways dissatisfied. However, just over a year later, in February 1939, Heikkinen led the opposition when Kipke ran for the university's Board of Regents and campaigned actively for Kipke's opponent.

=== Political campaigning in 1938 ===
Heikkinen majored in political science and did political organization work for the Young Republicans during the summer of 1938 in Gogebic and Ontonagon Counties. He was the Upper Peninsula field representative for gubernatorial candidate Harry S. Toy in 1938, traveling more than 16,000 miles over the course of the summer.

=== 1938 season ===
In 1938, with Heikkinen returning at guard, a new coach in Fritz Crisler, and sophomores Forest Evashevski and Tom Harmon joining the varsity squad, the Wolverines began to turn things around. They finished with a 6–1–1 record and were ranked #16 in the final AP poll.

Harmon and Evashevski made immediate contributions, but Heikkinen was once again voted the team's Most Valuable Player. Having been the first junior to win the award in 1937, he became the first player to receive the award twice in 1938. Though line coach Anderson did not return in 1937, Michigan hired Clarence "Biggie" Munn to replace him. Munn was a unanimous All-American guard for Minnesota in 1931. Under the new coaching staff of Crisler and Munn, Heikkinen became one of the best college football players in the country. After the 1938 season, Heikkinen credited Crisler and Munn for his development. Heikkinen noted that Michigan linemen were taught not to depend on sheer strength. "We have not been taught to rear up and hurl back the opposition. We have not been taught to roll it back by power. We have been schooled to out-block and out-trick the other side. Our method is to be alert. We try to catch the other fellows off balance."

Michigan won the first game of the season against Michigan State, 14–0, and Heikkinen drew attention for playing 59 of 60 minutes in the game. The team's only loss was a close 7–6 defeat to Minnesota in the third game of the season.

The fourth game of the season was a 45–7 win over Yale. An Ann Arbor newspaper reported that Gerald R. Ford, former Michigan center then serving as a scout for Yale, "tried to feed Hike a line . . . on how impossibly inferior" Yale's team would be. According to the report, Heikkinen, "in his typically pungent manner, nipped Ford's eulogies in the bud with some poignant remarks on who was trying to kid who and how."

The 1938 Northwestern game ended in a scoreless tie. Heikkinen led a goal-line stand that preserved the tie. Northwestern reached the 11-yard line on a 51-yard pass play. A penalty took the ball to the six-yard line. On first down, they drove to the five, then to the two, and then to the one-yard line for a first down. On first down with a yard to go, Heikkinen stopped Northwestern a foot short of the goal line. Heikkinen called time out and encouraged the players when the ball was on the one-foot line, and the Michigan team kept the Wildcats from the end zone in an impressive goal-line stand. In the Ohio State game, his former coach Anderson said: "He was the fifth man in the Ohio backfield. He pulled out of the line to lead the Michigan interference, blocked, went down under punts, smeared Ohio running plays and what not!"

Detroit News sports editor H.G. Salsinger wrote: "He was Michigan's outstanding player for the last two years. He was probably the best offensive guard Michigan ever had, and fitted perfectly into the new Michigan running attack. Fast and powerful, Heikkinen frequently blocked out two defense players. Heikkinen was the fastest charger in the Michigan line. He outmaneuvered opponents. On defense it was impossible to gain through his position, and he had a way of jamming opposing lines and making holes so that his secondary could break through and stop the ball carrier."

Ann Arbor newspaper writer, Bud Benjamin, wrote about Heikkinen: "If ever a player deserved national recognition it is the brilliant Ralph Heikkinen, 180 pounds of inspired dynamite in a great Michigan line. . . . He came out of a small town in northern Michigan, Hike, did, a sandy haired, extremely reserved Finnish boy with an irrepressible urge to play football." He played between 50 and 60 minutes of every game in 1937 and 1938 and not once was a timeout called on his account or a substitution made for him due to injury. "He was on his feet – active, explosive, dynamic --all the time."

=== Selection as an All-American ===
Heikkinen was chosen as a unanimous first-team All-American by more than 25 sports magazines, newspapers and wire services, including the Associated Press, the United Press, Grantland Rice for Collier's Weekly, the Newspaper Enterprise Association Service, the New York Sun, and Chesterfield Cigarettes as selected by Eddie Dooley.

Heikkinen received 226 points in the United Press poll, the fifth highest total in the balloting. The UP noted: "He dominated the voting for guards on ballots from the East, West, South and North. He has a trick on defense of jamming the opposition line and making a hole for a teammate to go through and get the ball carrier. On offense, he excels in swinging out to lead the interference and often gets in two blocks on a play. Motion pictures of the Ohio State-Michigan game show Heikkinen jamming opposing linesmen back from one to three yards on almost every play. He is so good that professional teams have approached him, but he wants to study law."

In announcing its selection, the Associated Press noted: "An all-Big Ten guard for two years, Heikkinen tears down under punts, pulls out of the line to lead interference and tackles hard. He is Michigan's first All-American in five years. A 60-minute performer, seldom fooled by intricate maneuvers, Heikkinen is regarded by Coach Fritz Crisler as the finest guard he has ever seen." The NEA said: "Ralph Heikkinen, Michigan senior and Ramsay, was small as guards go. He stood only five feet eight and weighed 182 pounds but he was the fastest guard in the Big Ten . . . one of the best Fritz Crisler ever saw. He had a great offensive charge. A corking blocker, especially when pulling out of the line, he was chosen as the Wolverines' most valuable player in 1937." Another reporter described Heikkinen as "Michigan's 182-pound dynamo," who was "fast as a halfback, and possessing the quickest charge his coach, Fritz Crisler, has seen."

In addition to the All-American honors, Heikkinen finished second in voting for the Chicago Tribune Silver Football trophy as the Big Ten Conference's Most Valuable Player. He was also chosen to play in the East-West Shrine Game in San Francisco on January 1, 1939. And in July 1939, Heikkinen was elected with 846,943 votes (fourth highest vote count of any player) to play in the annual game between the College All-Stars and the NFL New York Giants. The Ironwood Daily Globe boasted that residents of Michigan's sparsely populated Gogebic Range had accounted for 25,000 of Heikkinen's votes.

=== Heikkinen the poet ===
Many of the articles reporting on Heikkinen's All-American selection focused on his academic performance and on his love of poetry. While at Michigan, Heikkinen was also the president of the undergraduate "M" club in 1938 and president of U-M's senior honor society, "Michigamua." Detroit News sports editor H.G. Salsinger wrote that Heikkinen "writes poetry, and one of his poems appeared in a literary publication in 1938." The Associated press noted that Heikkinen was "a high-ranking student whose hobby is poetry" An Ann Arbor paper wrote: "He's extremely intelligent, dabbling in such fields as creative writing, drama, and poetry with considerable vim and no little skill during his spare moments. He is completely unassuming, unusually quiet, and above all a real gentleman." In August 1939, Heikkinen was hired by a magazine to write a story on college football. Newspapers reported that Heikkinen was "collecting dividends on the reputation he made as a poet and writer as an undergraduate." In 1937, Heikkinen was the subject of an article titled, "But He's No Sissy." The articles noted that Heikkinen "adheres strictly to a liquid diet" and drank a full quart of milk after every game as part of a special diet due to a stomach disorder.

=== Hero of the Upper Peninsula ===
Heikkinen was the first player from the Upper Peninsula of Michigan to win All-Big Ten honors in 1938, and he topped that in 1939 as the region's first All-American. His exploits were followed closely both during the summer and during the football season in the Gogebic Range's newspapers, The Ironwood Daily Globe and The Bessemer Herald. When he was named an All-American by the AP, it was front-page news, and the sports sections ran banner headlines. The Ironwood Daily Globe reported: "Football honors are coming so fast for Ralph I. Heikkinen . . . that it's hard for range fans who have watched Ralph's progress on the gridiron to keep up with the latest developments. The latest and greatest tribute came today with the releasing of the Associated Press all-America team on which he was named for a guard position. Heikkinen has twice been named on the all-conference eleven and twice selected as Michigan's most valuable player, the latter award never before having gone to a Michigan man two years in a row. There remains only one greater honor possible – that of being named to Grantland Rice's official all-America team."

When he was named to the Grantland Rice team the following week, the Globe reported: "Heikkinen's exceptional analytical ability on defense and his near-perfect blocking on offense this last season has gained him a position on every major all-star team chosen this year." On December 8, 1938, the Globe announced that a banquet honoring Heikkinen would be held with "Hike" himself traveling north to attend.

In the week leading up to the banquet, the Globe published an interview with "Hike"'s high school football coach, Robert Reihsen. On the day of the banquet, the Bessemer Herald ran an editorial urging the city of Ramsay to name a street or park in Heikkinen's honor: "Ramsay has never received the national publicity that its native son, Ralph Heikkinen, has brought to it this fall. By newspapers, magazines and radio the Gogebic range's first All-American football star has brought renown to himself, his home town and his school. If Ramsay has any street, public building, park or athletic field, that are now without title, or the names of which can be changed, why not dedicate something to Ralph Heikkinen who has so nobly proved himself to be Bessemer township's leading citizen for 1938? Other communities have done as much for their heroes. As far as the University of Michigan is concerned Heikkinen has already written his name forever on the athletic scroll of honor. He takes his place with a long line of All-American Wolverines. They are never forgotten at the Ann Arbor institution."

At the testimonial dinner, Heikkinen's six-year-old brother, Donald Heikkinen, was asked to name the greatest football player in the world and responded, "Ralph." Donald offered that Ralph was best because he used "proper technique," and found it difficult to choose his older brother's greatest play because "there were so many of them." Referring to the Ohio State game, Donald noted, "Ralph crushed through and smeared 'em." Heikkinen, or "Hike" as he was known to Yoopers, was presented with a purse of $36 representing the No. 36 he wore for Michigan.

Heikkinen's high school coach was the "toastmaster," and the local school superintendent, E.J. Oas, said that Heikkinen is "not only all-American, he's all man and all gentleman." A nine-piece orchestra played, and led the community in singing. And the local American Legion post presented him with a medal. The Bessemer Herald reported that "friends and admirers of Ralph Heikkinen . . . came from all parts of the Upper Peninsula last night to pay tribute to the football star." The following day, he spoke to students in the assembly room of Bessemer high school where the school band gave a concert and Heikkinen was "given a boisterous welcome by the students."

The Upper Peninsula press continued to report on Heikkinen's every move, as he returned home shortly before Christmas, before heading west to play in the East-West Shrine Game. On his departure for California, The Bessemer Herald said: "Ralph has made every major All America team in the nation this year. . . . Our nation has had many great men to emulate. The children of the Ramsay school not only have these in common with all others, but we have our own local hero who has gained national repute as a gentleman, scholar and last, but not least, a great athlete. To say that we are proud of Ralph is putting it mild. We feel that we are very honored to have had him as a student of the Ramsay school."

The celebration resumed again in January 1939 when Michigan coach Fritz Crisler accompanied Heikkinen back to the Upper Peninsula for another banquet. Filmed highlights of Michigan's 1938 season, featuring Heikkinen, were shown at the banquet. Even in April 1939, Heikkinen's appearances at banquets in the Upper Peninsula drew large crowds and wide press coverage.

In 1954, Heikkinen was one of the twenty initial inductees into the Gogebic Range Sports Hall of Fame.

== Professional football ==
Heikkinen signed on as an assistant coach at Michigan in the spring 1939 initially expressing ambivalence about playing professional football. Then, on September 9, 1939, he had accepted an offer to play with the Brooklyn Dodgers of the NFL. Heikkinen had previously refused offers to play pro football, but the persistence of coach Potsy Clark, and Crisler's assurance that a coaching job would be open for him in 1940, persuaded Heikkinen to try professional football. Heikkinen noted on signing, though, that he would definitely return to law school in 1940. It was reported that Heikkinen signed a contract for "at least $175 a game" with the Dodgers. Heikkinen was cut by the Dodgers after playing only three games.

When Heikkinen was released, one writer noted that Heikkinen "was perhaps the biggest disappointment among the highly ballyhooed players who came up this season." Brooklyn' coach Clark noted that an "All-American man doesn't mean a thing to us" in the NFL. Clark said: "Heikkinen weighed only 183 pounds and was pretty light for our league. He reported late and didn't give himself a fair chance to show me what he could do. I just didn't think he was in the right physical shape and mental shape.

The Upper Peninsula press disputed accounts that Heikkinen had not cut it in the NFL. Heikkinen's friends said that Heikkinen asked for his own release in order to accept the opportunity to study law and coach football at the University of Virginia. One Upper Peninsula paper reported: "Had Heikkinen wanted to, he still could be a member of the Brooklyn squad. However, the Dodgers moguls co-operated with Ralph and released him from his contract when he informed them of the Virginia offer."

== Later years ==
In October 1939, Heikkinen was hired as the line coach at the University of Virginia, where he also studied law. An influential alumnus of Virginia interviewed Heikkinen when the Dodgers played the Detroit Lions and was instrumental in securing Heikkinen's position with Virginia. Heikkinen worked as Virginia's line coach from 1940 to 1944 and graduated first in his class from the University of Virginia School of Law in 1944. Fellow Michigan All-American, Edliff Slaughter, was also a Virginia coach with Heikkinen. During World War II, in 1943, Slaughter and Heikkinen turned from coaching to teaching aerial navigation at the University of Virginia Flight Preparatory School.

On March 3, 1941, Heikkinen married Margaret Jackson, in Davenport, Iowa. In March 1947, Hekkinen was appointed line coach at Marquette University in Milwaukee, Wisconsin. Heikkinen was line coach under head coach Frank Murray at Virginia and joined Murray again at Marquette. In between the stints at Virginia and Marquette, Heikkinen was a New York attorney. While serving as Marquette's line coach, Heikkinen also carried a full teaching schedule as an assistant law professor on the faculty of Marquette law school. Heikkinen only stayed one year at Marquette, returning to the practice of law in New York in 1948.

After leaving Marquette, Heikkinen worked as executive secretary and attorney for the Studebaker-Packard Corporation. He later joined the legal staff at General Motors, retiring in 1978 after 20 years of service in GM's legal department. Heikkinen helped initiate and implement a corporation-wide alcohol treatment and education program at GM.

In 1987, Heikkinen was inducted into the University of Michigan Athletic Hall of Honor. He died of heart failure in Pontiac, Michigan at age 72. He was survived by his wife, Margaret Helen Heikkinen, and six children, Ralph Heikkinen Jr., James Heikkinen, Peggy Parisen, Elizabeth Heikkinen, Linda Heikkinen, and Pamela Ronci. His funeral was held at St. Paul Methodist Church in Bloomfield Hills, Michigan.

== See also ==
- List of Michigan Wolverines football All-Americans
