= 1938 NYU Violets football team =

American college football season

1938 NYU Violets football
- Conference: Independent
- Record: 4–4
- Head coach: Mal Stevens (5th season)
- Home stadium: Ohio Field; Polo Grounds; Yankee Stadium

1938 Eastern college football independents records
	Conf.			Overall
Team	W	L	T	W		L		T
Worcester Tech		–		6	–	0	–	0
No. 18 Villanova		–		8	–	0	–	1
No. 9 Holy Cross		–		8	–	1	–	0
Boston College		–		6	–	1	–	2
No. 15 Fordham		–		6	–	1	–	2
No. 12 Cornell		–		5	–	1	–	1
Army		–		8	–	2	–	0
No. 8 Pittsburgh		–		8	–	2	–	0
No. 6 Carnegie Tech		–		7	–	2	–	0
No. 20 Dartmouth		–		7	–	2	–	0
Vermont		–		4	–	2	–	1
Brown		–		5	–	3	–	0
Bucknell		–		5	–	3	–	0
Syracuse		–		5	–	3	–	0
CCNY		–		4	–	3	–	0
Penn		–		3	–	2	–	3
Manhattan		–		5	–	4	–	0
Harvard		–		4	–	4	–	0
La Salle		–		4	–	4	–	0
NYU		–		4	–	4	–	0
Boston University		–		3	–	4	–	1
Penn State		–		3	–	4	–	1
Princeton		–		3	–	4	–	1
Hofstra		–		2	–	3	–	1
Duquesne		–		4	–	6	–	0
Temple		–		3	–	6	–	1
Providence		–		3	–	5	–	0
Columbia		–		3	–	6	–	0
Massachusetts State		–		3	–	6	–	0
Colgate		–		2	–	5	–	0
Buffalo		–		2	–	6	–	0
Yale		–		2	–	6	–	0
Tufts		–		1	–	6	–	1
Rankings from AP Poll

The 1938 NYU Violets football team was an American football team that represented New York University as an independent during the 1938 college football season. In their fifth year under head coach Mal Stevens, the team compiled a 4–4 record.

== Schedule ==
Date	Opponent	Site	Result	Attendance	Source
October 1	Maine	Ohio Field; Bronx, NY	W 19–0	10,000	
October 8	at Rutgers	Neilson Field; New Brunswick, NJ	W 25–6	12,000	
October 15	North Carolina	Yankee Stadium; Bronx, NY	L 0–7	15,000	
October 22	at Lafayette	Fisher Field; Easton, PA	L 6–7	10,000	
October 29	No. 20 Ohio State	Polo Grounds; New York, NY	L 0–32	20,000	
November 5	Lehigh	Ohio Field; Bronx, NY	W 45–0	10,000	
November 11	Colgate	Yankee Stadium; Bronx, NY	W 13–7	25,000	
November 26	vs. No. 18 Fordham	Yankee Stadium; Bronx, NY	L 0–25	50,000	
Rankings from AP Poll released prior to the game
