= 1938 CCNY Beavers football team =

American college football season

1938 CCNY Beavers football
- Conference: Independent
- Record: 4–3
- Head coach: Benny Friedman (5th season)
- Home stadium: Lewisohn Stadium

1938 Eastern college football independents records
	Conf.			Overall
Team	W	L	T	W		L		T
Worcester Tech		–		6	–	0	–	0
No. 18 Villanova		–		8	–	0	–	1
No. 9 Holy Cross		–		8	–	1	–	0
Boston College		–		6	–	1	–	2
No. 15 Fordham		–		6	–	1	–	2
No. 12 Cornell		–		5	–	1	–	1
Army		–		8	–	2	–	0
No. 8 Pittsburgh		–		8	–	2	–	0
No. 6 Carnegie Tech		–		7	–	2	–	0
No. 20 Dartmouth		–		7	–	2	–	0
Vermont		–		4	–	2	–	1
Brown		–		5	–	3	–	0
Bucknell		–		5	–	3	–	0
Syracuse		–		5	–	3	–	0
CCNY		–		4	–	3	–	0
Penn		–		3	–	2	–	3
Manhattan		–		5	–	4	–	0
Harvard		–		4	–	4	–	0
La Salle		–		4	–	4	–	0
NYU		–		4	–	4	–	0
Boston University		–		3	–	4	–	1
Penn State		–		3	–	4	–	1
Princeton		–		3	–	4	–	1
Hofstra		–		2	–	3	–	1
Duquesne		–		4	–	6	–	0
Temple		–		3	–	6	–	1
Providence		–		3	–	5	–	0
Columbia		–		3	–	6	–	0
Massachusetts State		–		3	–	6	–	0
Colgate		–		2	–	5	–	0
Buffalo		–		2	–	6	–	0
Yale		–		2	–	6	–	0
Tufts		–		1	–	6	–	1
Rankings from AP Poll

The 1938 CCNY Beavers football team was an American football team that represented the City College of New York (CCNY) as an independent during the 1938 college football season. In their fifth season under head coach Benny Friedman, the team compiled a 4–3 record.

== Schedule ==
Date	Opponent	Site	Result	Attendance	Source
October 1	Buffalo	Lewisohn Stadium; New York, NY	W 15–2	5,000	
October 8	at Saint Joseph's	Finnesey Field; Philadelphia, PA	L 7–27	5,000	
October 15	Clarkson	Lewisohn Stadium; New York, NY	L 6–19	4,000	
October 22	at Brooklyn	Brooklyn College Field; Brooklyn, NY	W 21–0	8,000	
October 29	Lowell Textile	Lewisohn Stadium; New York, NY	W 32–0		
November 5	at Providence	Hendricken Field; Providence, RI	L 6–25		
November 12	Moravian	Lewisohn Stadium; New York, NY	W 40–14		
