= 1938 La Salle Explorers football team =

American college football season

1938 La Salle Explorers football
- Conference: Independent
- Record: 4–4
- Head coach: Marty Brill (6th season)
- Home stadium: McCarthy Stadium

1938 Eastern college football independents records
	Conf.			Overall
Team	W	L	T	W		L		T
Worcester Tech		–		6	–	0	–	0
No. 18 Villanova		–		8	–	0	–	1
No. 9 Holy Cross		–		8	–	1	–	0
Boston College		–		6	–	1	–	2
No. 15 Fordham		–		6	–	1	–	2
No. 12 Cornell		–		5	–	1	–	1
Army		–		8	–	2	–	0
No. 8 Pittsburgh		–		8	–	2	–	0
No. 6 Carnegie Tech		–		7	–	2	–	0
No. 20 Dartmouth		–		7	–	2	–	0
Vermont		–		4	–	2	–	1
Brown		–		5	–	3	–	0
Bucknell		–		5	–	3	–	0
Syracuse		–		5	–	3	–	0
CCNY		–		4	–	3	–	0
Penn		–		3	–	2	–	3
Manhattan		–		5	–	4	–	0
Harvard		–		4	–	4	–	0
La Salle		–		4	–	4	–	0
NYU		–		4	–	4	–	0
Boston University		–		3	–	4	–	1
Penn State		–		3	–	4	–	1
Princeton		–		3	–	4	–	1
Hofstra		–		2	–	3	–	1
Duquesne		–		4	–	6	–	0
Temple		–		3	–	6	–	1
Providence		–		3	–	5	–	0
Columbia		–		3	–	6	–	0
Massachusetts State		–		3	–	6	–	0
Colgate		–		2	–	5	–	0
Buffalo		–		2	–	6	–	0
Yale		–		2	–	6	–	0
Tufts		–		1	–	6	–	1
Rankings from AP Poll

The 1938 La Salle Explorers football team was an American football team that represented La Salle College (now known as La Salle University) as an independent during the 1938 college football season. In their sixth year under head coach Marty Brill, the Explorers compiled a 4–4 record.

== Schedule ==
Date	Opponent	Site	Result	Attendance	Source
September 25	at Niagara	Varsity Stadium; Lewiston, NY	L 0–40	5,000	
October 1	Elon	McCarthy Stadium; Philadelphia, PA	W 13–0		
October 9	at Scranton	Athletic Park; Scranton, PA	L 0–12	3,000	
October 14	at West Chester	Wayne Field; West Chester, PA	L 0–12	8,000	
October 23	at Mount St. Mary's	Emmitsburg, MD	W 20–0		
October 30	at Saint Joseph's	Finnesey Field; Philadelphia, PA	L 0–7	8,000	
November 5	Albright	McCarthy Stadium; Philadelphia, PA	W 14–6		
November 12	Pennsylvania Military College	McCarthy Stadium; Philadelphia, PA	W 20–0		
