= 1938 Columbia Lions football team =

American college football season

1938 Columbia Lions football
- Conference: Independent
- Record: 3–6
- Head coach: Lou Little (9th season)
- Captain: John C. Wright
- Home stadium: Baker Field

1938 Eastern college football independents records
	Conf.			Overall
Team	W	L	T	W		L		T
Worcester Tech		–		6	–	0	–	0
No. 18 Villanova		–		8	–	0	–	1
No. 9 Holy Cross		–		8	–	1	–	0
Boston College		–		6	–	1	–	2
No. 15 Fordham		–		6	–	1	–	2
No. 12 Cornell		–		5	–	1	–	1
Army		–		8	–	2	–	0
No. 8 Pittsburgh		–		8	–	2	–	0
No. 6 Carnegie Tech		–		7	–	2	–	0
No. 20 Dartmouth		–		7	–	2	–	0
Vermont		–		4	–	2	–	1
Brown		–		5	–	3	–	0
Bucknell		–		5	–	3	–	0
Syracuse		–		5	–	3	–	0
CCNY		–		4	–	3	–	0
Penn		–		3	–	2	–	3
Manhattan		–		5	–	4	–	0
Harvard		–		4	–	4	–	0
La Salle		–		4	–	4	–	0
NYU		–		4	–	4	–	0
Boston University		–		3	–	4	–	1
Penn State		–		3	–	4	–	1
Princeton		–		3	–	4	–	1
Hofstra		–		2	–	3	–	1
Duquesne		–		4	–	6	–	0
Temple		–		3	–	6	–	1
Providence		–		3	–	5	–	0
Columbia		–		3	–	6	–	0
Massachusetts State		–		3	–	6	–	0
Colgate		–		2	–	5	–	0
Buffalo		–		2	–	6	–	0
Yale		–		2	–	6	–	0
Tufts		–		1	–	6	–	1
Rankings from AP Poll

The 1938 Columbia Lions football team was an American football team that represented Columbia University as an independent during the 1938 college football season. In his ninth season, head coach Lou Little led the team to a 3–6 record, though the Lions were only outscored 169 to 167 by opponents.

The team played its home games at Baker Field in Upper Manhattan.

== Schedule ==
Date	Time	Opponent	Site	Result	Attendance	Source
October 1		at Yale	Yale Bowl; New Haven, CT	W 27–14	35,000	
October 8		at Army	Michie Stadium; West Point, NY	W 20–18	25,000	
October 15		Colgate	Baker Field; New York, NY	L 0–12	30,000	
October 22		at Penn	Franklin Field; Philadelphia, PA	L 13–14	60,000	
October 29		No. 17 Cornell	Baker Field; New York, NY (rivalry)	L 7–23	34,000	
November 5		Virginia	Baker Field; New York, NY	W 39–0	15,000	
November 12		Navy	Baker Field; New York, NY	L 9–14	33,000	
November 19		Syracuse	Baker Field; New York, NY	L 12–13	20,000	
November 24	11:00 a.m.	Brown	Andrews Field; Providence, RI	L 27–36	20,000	
Rankings from AP Poll released prior to the game
