= 1938 Massachusetts State Aggies football team =

American college football season

1938 Massachusetts State Aggies football
- Conference: Independent
- Record: 3–6
- Head coach: Elbert Carraway (3rd season)
- Home stadium: Alumni Field

1938 Eastern college football independents records
	Conf.			Overall
Team	W	L	T	W		L		T
Worcester Tech		–		6	–	0	–	0
No. 18 Villanova		–		8	–	0	–	1
No. 9 Holy Cross		–		8	–	1	–	0
Boston College		–		6	–	1	–	2
No. 15 Fordham		–		6	–	1	–	2
No. 12 Cornell		–		5	–	1	–	1
Army		–		8	–	2	–	0
No. 8 Pittsburgh		–		8	–	2	–	0
No. 6 Carnegie Tech		–		7	–	2	–	0
No. 20 Dartmouth		–		7	–	2	–	0
Vermont		–		4	–	2	–	1
Brown		–		5	–	3	–	0
Bucknell		–		5	–	3	–	0
Syracuse		–		5	–	3	–	0
CCNY		–		4	–	3	–	0
Penn		–		3	–	2	–	3
Manhattan		–		5	–	4	–	0
Harvard		–		4	–	4	–	0
La Salle		–		4	–	4	–	0
NYU		–		4	–	4	–	0
Boston University		–		3	–	4	–	1
Penn State		–		3	–	4	–	1
Princeton		–		3	–	4	–	1
Hofstra		–		2	–	3	–	1
Duquesne		–		4	–	6	–	0
Temple		–		3	–	6	–	1
Providence		–		3	–	5	–	0
Columbia		–		3	–	6	–	0
Massachusetts State		–		3	–	6	–	0
Colgate		–		2	–	5	–	0
Buffalo		–		2	–	6	–	0
Yale		–		2	–	6	–	0
Tufts		–		1	–	6	–	1
Rankings from AP Poll

The 1938 Massachusetts State Aggies football team represented Massachusetts State College in the 1938 college football season. The team played its home games at Alumni Field in Amherst, Massachusetts. Elbert Carraway was the head coach. Mass State finished the season with a record of 3–6.

== Schedule ==
Note: All scores/opponents sourced from Carlson 1988.

Date	Opponent	Site	Result
September 24	American International	Alumni Field; Amherst, MA	W 12–6
October 1	at Bowdoin	Whittier Field; Brunswick, ME	L 0–32
October 8	at Connecticut	Gardner Dow Athletic Fields; Storrs, CT (rivalry)	L 0–19
October 15	Rhode Island	Alumni Field; Amherst, MA	L 0–20
October 22	Worcester Poly	Alumni Field; Worcester, MA	L 0–6
October 29	at Amherst	Pratt Field; Amherst, MA	L 0–35
November 5	Coast Guard	Alumni Field; Amherst, MA	W 7–0
November 12	at RPI	'86 Field; Troy, NY	W 37–0
November 19	at Tufts	Tufts Oval; Somerville, MA	L 6–7
