= 1938 Bucknell Bison football team =

American college football season

1938 Bucknell Bison football
- Conference: Independent
- Record: 5–3
- Head coach: Al Humphreys (2nd season)
- Home stadium: Memorial Stadium

1938 Eastern college football independents records
	Conf.			Overall
Team	W	L	T	W		L		T
Worcester Tech		–		6	–	0	–	0
No. 18 Villanova		–		8	–	0	–	1
No. 9 Holy Cross		–		8	–	1	–	0
Boston College		–		6	–	1	–	2
No. 15 Fordham		–		6	–	1	–	2
No. 12 Cornell		–		5	–	1	–	1
Army		–		8	–	2	–	0
No. 8 Pittsburgh		–		8	–	2	–	0
No. 6 Carnegie Tech		–		7	–	2	–	0
No. 20 Dartmouth		–		7	–	2	–	0
Vermont		–		4	–	2	–	1
Brown		–		5	–	3	–	0
Bucknell		–		5	–	3	–	0
Syracuse		–		5	–	3	–	0
CCNY		–		4	–	3	–	0
Penn		–		3	–	2	–	3
Manhattan		–		5	–	4	–	0
Harvard		–		4	–	4	–	0
La Salle		–		4	–	4	–	0
NYU		–		4	–	4	–	0
Boston University		–		3	–	4	–	1
Penn State		–		3	–	4	–	1
Princeton		–		3	–	4	–	1
Hofstra		–		2	–	3	–	1
Duquesne		–		4	–	6	–	0
Temple		–		3	–	6	–	1
Providence		–		3	–	5	–	0
Columbia		–		3	–	6	–	0
Massachusetts State		–		3	–	6	–	0
Colgate		–		2	–	5	–	0
Buffalo		–		2	–	6	–	0
Yale		–		2	–	6	–	0
Tufts		–		1	–	6	–	1
Rankings from AP Poll

The 1938 Bucknell Bison football team was an American football team that represented Bucknell University as an independent during the 1938 college football season. In its second season under head coach Al Humphreys, the team compiled a 5–3 record.

The team played its home games at Memorial Stadium in Lewisburg, Pennsylvania.

== Schedule ==
Date	Opponent	Site	Result	Attendance	Source
September 23	Furman	Memorial Stadium; Lewisburg, PA	W 28–6	7,000	
October 1	Gettysburg	Memorial Stadium; Lewisburg, PA	W 27–14		
October 8	at Penn State	New Beaver Field; University Park, PA	W 14–0	12,071	
October 14	at Temple	Temple Stadium; Philadelphia, PA	L 0–26		
October 29	Albright	Memorial Stadium; Lewisburg, PA	W 6–0		
November 4	at Georgetown	Griffith Stadium; Washington, DC	L 0–13	15,000	
November 19	George Washington^{†}	Memorial Stadium; Lewisburg, PA	W 16–0	2,000	
November 24	at Miami (FL)	Burdine Stadium; Miami, FL	L 0–19		
^{†}Homecoming
