= 1938 Harvard Crimson football team =

American college football season

1938 Harvard Crimson football
- Conference: Independent
- Record: 4–4
- Head coach: Dick Harlow (4th season)
- Captain: Bobby Green
- Home stadium: Harvard Stadium

1938 Eastern college football independents records
	Conf.			Overall
Team	W	L	T	W		L		T
Worcester Tech		–		6	–	0	–	0
No. 18 Villanova		–		8	–	0	–	1
No. 9 Holy Cross		–		8	–	1	–	0
Boston College		–		6	–	1	–	2
No. 15 Fordham		–		6	–	1	–	2
No. 12 Cornell		–		5	–	1	–	1
Army		–		8	–	2	–	0
No. 8 Pittsburgh		–		8	–	2	–	0
No. 6 Carnegie Tech		–		7	–	2	–	0
No. 20 Dartmouth		–		7	–	2	–	0
Vermont		–		4	–	2	–	1
Brown		–		5	–	3	–	0
Bucknell		–		5	–	3	–	0
Syracuse		–		5	–	3	–	0
CCNY		–		4	–	3	–	0
Penn		–		3	–	2	–	3
Manhattan		–		5	–	4	–	0
Harvard		–		4	–	4	–	0
La Salle		–		4	–	4	–	0
NYU		–		4	–	4	–	0
Boston University		–		3	–	4	–	1
Penn State		–		3	–	4	–	1
Princeton		–		3	–	4	–	1
Hofstra		–		2	–	3	–	1
Duquesne		–		4	–	6	–	0
Temple		–		3	–	6	–	1
Providence		–		3	–	5	–	0
Columbia		–		3	–	6	–	0
Massachusetts State		–		3	–	6	–	0
Colgate		–		2	–	5	–	0
Buffalo		–		2	–	6	–	0
Yale		–		2	–	6	–	0
Tufts		–		1	–	6	–	1
Rankings from AP Poll

The 1938 Harvard Crimson football team was an American football team that represented Harvard University as an independent during the 1938 college football season. In its fourth season under head coach Dick Harlow, the team compiled a 4–4 record and outscored opponents by a total of 157 to 106. The season began with four consecutive losses and ended with four consecutive wins.

Key players included halfbacks Frank Foley and Torbert "Torby" Macdonald, quarterback Cliff Wilson, ends Don Daughters and Bobby Green (also captain), and guard Nick Mellen.

The team played its home games at Harvard Stadium in Cambridge, Massachusetts.

== Schedule ==
Date	Opponent	Site	Result	Attendance	Source
October 1	Brown	Harvard Stadium; Boston, MA	L 13–20	25,000	
October 8	Cornell	Harvard Stadium; Boston, MA	L 0–20	35,000	
October 15	Army	Harvard Stadium; Boston, MA	L 17–20	55,000	
October 22	No. 4 Dartmouth	Harvard Stadium; Boston, MA (rivalry)	L 7–13		
October 29	Princeton	Princeton, NJ (rivalry)	W 26–7		
November 5	Chicago	Harvard Stadium; Boston, MA	W 47–13	20,000	
November 12	Virginia	Harvard Stadium; Boston, MA	W 40–13	15,000	
November 19	at Yale	Yale Bowl; New Haven, CT (rivalry)	W 7–0	62,000	
Rankings from AP Poll released prior to the game
