= 1938 Penn Quakers football team =

American college football season

1938 Penn Quakers football
- Conference: Independent
- Record: 3–2–3
- Head coach: George Munger (1st season)
- Captain: Walter Shinn
- Home stadium: Franklin Field

1938 Eastern college football independents records
	Conf.			Overall
Team	W	L	T	W		L		T
Worcester Tech		–		6	–	0	–	0
No. 18 Villanova		–		8	–	0	–	1
No. 9 Holy Cross		–		8	–	1	–	0
Boston College		–		6	–	1	–	2
No. 15 Fordham		–		6	–	1	–	2
No. 12 Cornell		–		5	–	1	–	1
Army		–		8	–	2	–	0
No. 8 Pittsburgh		–		8	–	2	–	0
No. 6 Carnegie Tech		–		7	–	2	–	0
No. 20 Dartmouth		–		7	–	2	–	0
Vermont		–		4	–	2	–	1
Brown		–		5	–	3	–	0
Bucknell		–		5	–	3	–	0
Syracuse		–		5	–	3	–	0
CCNY		–		4	–	3	–	0
Penn		–		3	–	2	–	3
Manhattan		–		5	–	4	–	0
Harvard		–		4	–	4	–	0
La Salle		–		4	–	4	–	0
NYU		–		4	–	4	–	0
Boston University		–		3	–	4	–	1
Penn State		–		3	–	4	–	1
Princeton		–		3	–	4	–	1
Hofstra		–		2	–	3	–	1
Duquesne		–		4	–	6	–	0
Temple		–		3	–	6	–	1
Providence		–		3	–	5	–	0
Columbia		–		3	–	6	–	0
Massachusetts State		–		3	–	6	–	0
Colgate		–		2	–	5	–	0
Buffalo		–		2	–	6	–	0
Yale		–		2	–	6	–	0
Tufts		–		1	–	6	–	1
Rankings from AP Poll

The 1938 Penn Quakers football team was an American football team that represented the University of Pennsylvania as an independent during the 1938 college football season. In its first season under head coach George Munger, the team compiled a 3–2–3 record and was outscored by a total of 89 to 58. The team played its home games at Franklin Field in Philadelphia.

== Schedule ==
Date	Opponent	Site	Result	Attendance	Source
October 1	Lafayette	Franklin Field; Philadelphia, PA	W 34–6		
October 8	Yale	Franklin Field; Philadelphia, PA	W 21–0		
October 15	at Princeton	Palmer Stadium; Princeton, NJ (rivalry)	L 0–13		
October 22	Columbia	Franklin Field; Philadelphia, PA	W 14–13	60,000	
October 29	Navy	Franklin Field; Philadelphia, PA	T 0–0		
November 5	at No. 16 Michigan	Michigan Stadium; Ann Arbor, MI	L 13–19	31,292	
November 12	Penn State	Franklin Field; Philadelphia, PA	T 7–7	50,000	
November 24	No. 10 Cornell	Franklin Field; Philadelphia, PA (rivalry)	T 0–0		
Rankings from AP Poll released prior to the game
