= 1938 Colgate Red Raiders football team =

American college football season

1938 Colgate Red Raiders football
- Conference: Independent
- Record: 2–5
- Head coach: Andrew Kerr (10th season)
- Captains: Donald Wemple; John Lucy

1938 Eastern college football independents records
	Conf.			Overall
Team	W	L	T	W		L		T
Worcester Tech		–		6	–	0	–	0
No. 18 Villanova		–		8	–	0	–	1
No. 9 Holy Cross		–		8	–	1	–	0
Boston College		–		6	–	1	–	2
No. 15 Fordham		–		6	–	1	–	2
No. 12 Cornell		–		5	–	1	–	1
Army		–		8	–	2	–	0
No. 8 Pittsburgh		–		8	–	2	–	0
No. 6 Carnegie Tech		–		7	–	2	–	0
No. 20 Dartmouth		–		7	–	2	–	0
Vermont		–		4	–	2	–	1
Brown		–		5	–	3	–	0
Bucknell		–		5	–	3	–	0
Syracuse		–		5	–	3	–	0
CCNY		–		4	–	3	–	0
Penn		–		3	–	2	–	3
Manhattan		–		5	–	4	–	0
Harvard		–		4	–	4	–	0
La Salle		–		4	–	4	–	0
NYU		–		4	–	4	–	0
Boston University		–		3	–	4	–	1
Penn State		–		3	–	4	–	1
Princeton		–		3	–	4	–	1
Hofstra		–		2	–	3	–	1
Duquesne		–		4	–	6	–	0
Temple		–		3	–	6	–	1
Providence		–		3	–	5	–	0
Columbia		–		3	–	6	–	0
Massachusetts State		–		3	–	6	–	0
Colgate		–		2	–	5	–	0
Buffalo		–		2	–	6	–	0
Yale		–		2	–	6	–	0
Tufts		–		1	–	6	–	1
Rankings from AP Poll

The 1938 Colgate Red Raiders football team was an American football team that represented Colgate University as an independent during the 1938 college football season. In its tenth season under head coach Andrew Kerr, the team compiled a 2–5 record and was outscored by a total of 63 to 39. Donald Wemple and John Lucy were the team captains. The team played no home games.

== Schedule ==
Date	Opponent	Site	Result	Attendance	Source
October 1	at Cornell	Schoellkopf Field; Ithaca, NY (rivalry)	L 6–15		
October 8	vs. Duke	Civic Stadium; Buffalo, NY	L 0–7	23,950	
October 15	at Columbia	Baker Field; New York, NY	W 12–0	30,000	
October 22	at Iowa	Iowa Stadium; Iowa City, IA	W 14–0		
October 29	at No. 14 Holy Cross	Fitton Field; Worcester, MA	L 0–21		
November 5	at Syracuse	Archbold Stadium; Syracuse, NY (rivalry)	L 0–7	35,000	
November 11	at NYU	Yankee Stadium; Bronx, NY	L 7–13	25,000	
Rankings from AP Poll released prior to the game
