= 1938 Brown Bears football team =

American college football season

1938 Brown Bears football
- Conference: Independent
- Record: 5–3
- Head coach: Tuss McLaughry (13th season)
- Home stadium: Brown Stadium

1938 Eastern college football independents records
	Conf.			Overall
Team	W	L	T	W		L		T
Worcester Tech		–		6	–	0	–	0
No. 18 Villanova		–		8	–	0	–	1
No. 9 Holy Cross		–		8	–	1	–	0
Boston College		–		6	–	1	–	2
No. 15 Fordham		–		6	–	1	–	2
No. 12 Cornell		–		5	–	1	–	1
Army		–		8	–	2	–	0
No. 8 Pittsburgh		–		8	–	2	–	0
No. 6 Carnegie Tech		–		7	–	2	–	0
No. 20 Dartmouth		–		7	–	2	–	0
Vermont		–		4	–	2	–	1
Brown		–		5	–	3	–	0
Bucknell		–		5	–	3	–	0
Syracuse		–		5	–	3	–	0
CCNY		–		4	–	3	–	0
Penn		–		3	–	2	–	3
Manhattan		–		5	–	4	–	0
Harvard		–		4	–	4	–	0
La Salle		–		4	–	4	–	0
NYU		–		4	–	4	–	0
Boston University		–		3	–	4	–	1
Penn State		–		3	–	4	–	1
Princeton		–		3	–	4	–	1
Hofstra		–		2	–	3	–	1
Duquesne		–		4	–	6	–	0
Temple		–		3	–	6	–	1
Providence		–		3	–	5	–	0
Columbia		–		3	–	6	–	0
Massachusetts State		–		3	–	6	–	0
Colgate		–		2	–	5	–	0
Buffalo		–		2	–	6	–	0
Yale		–		2	–	6	–	0
Tufts		–		1	–	6	–	1
Rankings from AP Poll

The 1938 Brown Bears football team represented Brown University as an independent during the 1938 college football season. Led by 13th-year head coach Tuss McLaughry, the Bears compiled a record of 5–3.

== Schedule ==
Date	Time	Opponent	Site	Result	Attendance	Source
October 1		at Harvard	Harvard Stadium; Boston, MA	W 20–13	25,000	
October 8		Lafayette	Brown Stadium; Providence, RI	W 20–0		
October 15		at Dartmouth	Memorial Field; Hanover, NH	L 13–34		
October 22		Rhode Island State	Brown Stadium; Providence, RI (rivalry)	W 40–21		
October 29	2:00 p.m.	Tufts	Brown Stadium; Providence, RI	W 48–0		
November 5		at Yale	Yale Bowl; New Haven, CT	L 14–20		
November 12		at No. 11 Holy Cross	Fitton Field; Worcester, MA	L 12–14		
November 24	11:00 a.m.	Columbia	Brown Stadium; Providence, RI	W 36–27	20,000	
Rankings from AP Poll released prior to the game; All times are in Eastern time
