= 1938 Yale Bulldogs football team =

American college football season

1938 Yale Bulldogs football
- Conference: Independent
- Record: 2–6
- Head coach: Ducky Pond (5th season)
- Captain: William V. Platt
- Home stadium: Yale Bowl

1938 Eastern college football independents records
	Conf.			Overall
Team	W	L	T	W		L		T
Worcester Tech		–		6	–	0	–	0
No. 18 Villanova		–		8	–	0	–	1
No. 9 Holy Cross		–		8	–	1	–	0
Boston College		–		6	–	1	–	2
No. 15 Fordham		–		6	–	1	–	2
No. 12 Cornell		–		5	–	1	–	1
Army		–		8	–	2	–	0
No. 8 Pittsburgh		–		8	–	2	–	0
No. 6 Carnegie Tech		–		7	–	2	–	0
No. 20 Dartmouth		–		7	–	2	–	0
Vermont		–		4	–	2	–	1
Brown		–		5	–	3	–	0
Bucknell		–		5	–	3	–	0
Syracuse		–		5	–	3	–	0
CCNY		–		4	–	3	–	0
Penn		–		3	–	2	–	3
Manhattan		–		5	–	4	–	0
Harvard		–		4	–	4	–	0
La Salle		–		4	–	4	–	0
NYU		–		4	–	4	–	0
Boston University		–		3	–	4	–	1
Penn State		–		3	–	4	–	1
Princeton		–		3	–	4	–	1
Hofstra		–		2	–	3	–	1
Duquesne		–		4	–	6	–	0
Temple		–		3	–	6	–	1
Providence		–		3	–	5	–	0
Columbia		–		3	–	6	–	0
Massachusetts State		–		3	–	6	–	0
Colgate		–		2	–	5	–	0
Buffalo		–		2	–	6	–	0
Yale		–		2	–	6	–	0
Tufts		–		1	–	6	–	1
Rankings from AP Poll

The 1938 Yale Bulldogs football team represented Yale University in the 1938 college football season. The Bulldogs were led by fifth-year head coach Ducky Pond, played their home games at the Yale Bowl and finished the season with a 2–6 record.

== Schedule ==
Date	Opponent	Site	Result	Attendance	Source
October 1	Columbia	Yale Bowl; New Haven, CT	L 14–27	35,000	
October 8	at Penn	Franklin Field; Philadelphia, PA	L 0–21		
October 15	Navy	Yale Bowl; New Haven, CT	W 9–7		
October 22	No. 12 Michigan	Yale Bowl; New Haven, CT	L 13–15	29,261	
October 29	No. 6 Dartmouth	Yale Bowl; New Haven, CT	L 6–24		
November 5	Brown	Yale Bowl; New Haven, CT	W 20–14		
November 12	at Princeton	Palmer Stadium; Princeton, NJ (rivalry)	L 7–20		
November 19	Harvard	Yale Bowl; New Haven, CT (rivalry)	L 0–7	62,000	
Rankings from AP Poll released prior to the game
