= 1938 Princeton Tigers football team =

American college football season

1938 Princeton Tigers football
- Conference: Independent
- Record: 3–4–1
- Head coach: Tad Wieman (1st season)
- Captain: Tom Mountain
- Home stadium: Palmer Stadium

1938 Eastern college football independents records
	Conf.			Overall
Team	W	L	T	W		L		T
Worcester Tech		–		6	–	0	–	0
No. 18 Villanova		–		8	–	0	–	1
No. 9 Holy Cross		–		8	–	1	–	0
Boston College		–		6	–	1	–	2
No. 15 Fordham		–		6	–	1	–	2
No. 12 Cornell		–		5	–	1	–	1
Army		–		8	–	2	–	0
No. 8 Pittsburgh		–		8	–	2	–	0
No. 6 Carnegie Tech		–		7	–	2	–	0
No. 20 Dartmouth		–		7	–	2	–	0
Vermont		–		4	–	2	–	1
Brown		–		5	–	3	–	0
Bucknell		–		5	–	3	–	0
Syracuse		–		5	–	3	–	0
CCNY		–		4	–	3	–	0
Penn		–		3	–	2	–	3
Manhattan		–		5	–	4	–	0
Harvard		–		4	–	4	–	0
La Salle		–		4	–	4	–	0
NYU		–		4	–	4	–	0
Boston University		–		3	–	4	–	1
Penn State		–		3	–	4	–	1
Princeton		–		3	–	4	–	1
Hofstra		–		2	–	3	–	1
Duquesne		–		4	–	6	–	0
Temple		–		3	–	6	–	1
Providence		–		3	–	5	–	0
Columbia		–		3	–	6	–	0
Massachusetts State		–		3	–	6	–	0
Colgate		–		2	–	5	–	0
Buffalo		–		2	–	6	–	0
Yale		–		2	–	6	–	0
Tufts		–		1	–	6	–	1
Rankings from AP Poll

The 1938 Princeton Tigers football team was an American football team that represented Princeton University as an independent during the 1938 college football season. In its first season under head coach Tad Wieman, the team compiled a 3–4–1 record and outscored opponents by a total of 117 to 107. The team played its home games at Palmer Stadium in Princeton, New Jersey.

Tom Mountain was the team captain. He also received the John Prentiss Poe Cup, the team's highest award.

On February 9, 1938, Fritz Crisler announced his resignation as Princeton's head football coach in order to assume the same position at Michigan. Tad Wieman, who had served as an assistant coach under Crisler, was named days later as the school's new head coach.

== Schedule ==
Date	Opponent	Site	Result	Attendance	Source
October 1	Williams	Palmer Stadium; Princeton, NJ	W 39–0		
October 8	Dartmouth	Palmer Stadium; Princeton, NJ	L 0–22		
October 15	Penn	Palmer Stadium; Princeton, NJ	W 13–0		
October 22	at Navy	Thompson Stadium; Annapolis, MD	T 13–13		
October 29	at Harvard	Harvard Stadium; Boston, MA (rivalry)	L 7–26		
November 5	at Rutgers	New Brunswick, NJ (rivalry)	L 18–20	22,500	
November 12	Yale	Palmer Stadium; Princeton, NJ (rivalry)	W 20–7		
November 19	Army	Palmer Stadium; Princeton, NJ	L 7–19		
