= 1938 Boston College Eagles football team =

American college football season

1938 Boston College Eagles football
- Conference: Independent
- Record: 6–1–2
- Head coach: Gil Dobie (3rd season)
- Offensive scheme: Single-wing
- Base defense: 6–3–2
- Captain: Bill Flynn
- Home stadium: Alumni Field; Fenway Park

1938 Eastern college football independents records
	Conf.			Overall
Team	W	L	T	W		L		T
Worcester Tech		–		6	–	0	–	0
No. 18 Villanova		–		8	–	0	–	1
No. 9 Holy Cross		–		8	–	1	–	0
Boston College		–		6	–	1	–	2
No. 15 Fordham		–		6	–	1	–	2
No. 12 Cornell		–		5	–	1	–	1
Army		–		8	–	2	–	0
No. 8 Pittsburgh		–		8	–	2	–	0
No. 6 Carnegie Tech		–		7	–	2	–	0
No. 20 Dartmouth		–		7	–	2	–	0
Vermont		–		4	–	2	–	1
Brown		–		5	–	3	–	0
Bucknell		–		5	–	3	–	0
Syracuse		–		5	–	3	–	0
CCNY		–		4	–	3	–	0
Penn		–		3	–	2	–	3
Manhattan		–		5	–	4	–	0
Harvard		–		4	–	4	–	0
La Salle		–		4	–	4	–	0
NYU		–		4	–	4	–	0
Boston University		–		3	–	4	–	1
Penn State		–		3	–	4	–	1
Princeton		–		3	–	4	–	1
Hofstra		–		2	–	3	–	1
Duquesne		–		4	–	6	–	0
Temple		–		3	–	6	–	1
Providence		–		3	–	5	–	0
Columbia		–		3	–	6	–	0
Massachusetts State		–		3	–	6	–	0
Colgate		–		2	–	5	–	0
Buffalo		–		2	–	6	–	0
Yale		–		2	–	6	–	0
Tufts		–		1	–	6	–	1
Rankings from AP Poll

The 1938 Boston College Eagles football team represented Boston College as an independent during the 1938 college football season. Led by Gil Dobie in his third and final season as head coach, the Eagles compiled a record of 6–1–2. Boston College played home games at Alumni Field in Chestnut Hill, Massachusetts, and Fenway Park in Boston.

== Schedule ==
Date	Opponent	Site	Result	Attendance	Source
September 24	Canisius	Alumni Field; Chestnut Hill, MA	W 63–12		
September 30	Northeastern	Alumni Field; Chestnut Hill, MA	W 13–0	7,500	
October 12	Detroit	Fenway Park; Boston, MA	W 9–6	20,000	
October 21	at Temple	Temple Stadium; Philadelphia, PA	T 26–26	12,000	
October 29	Florida	Fenway Park; Boston, MA	W 33–0	7,732	
November 5	Indiana	Fenway Park; Boston, MA	W 14–0	25,000	
November 11	Boston University	Fenway Park; Boston, MA (rivalry)	W 21–14	15,000	
November 19	Saint Anselm	Alumni Field; Chestnut Hill, MA	T 0–0		
November 26	vs. No. 11 Holy Cross	Fenway Park; Boston, MA (rivalry)	L 7–29	36,000	
Rankings from AP Poll released prior to the game

== See also ==
- Lou Montgomery, the first Black athlete to play for BC; he made his varsity debut in the October 12 game vs. Detroit
