= 1938 Buffalo Bulls football team =

American college football season

1938 Buffalo Bulls football
- Conference: Independent
- Record: 2–6
- Head coach: Jim Peele (3rd season)
- Captain: Vito Grieco
- Home stadium: Rotary Field

1938 Eastern college football independents records
| | Conf. | | | Overall |
| Team | W | L | T | W | | L | | T |
|---|---|---|---|---|---|---|---|---|
| Worcester Tech | | – | | 6 | – | 0 | – | 0 |
| No. 18 Villanova | | – | | 8 | – | 0 | – | 1 |
| No. 9 Holy Cross | | – | | 8 | – | 1 | – | 0 |
| Boston College | | – | | 6 | – | 1 | – | 2 |
| No. 15 Fordham | | – | | 6 | – | 1 | – | 2 |
| No. 12 Cornell | | – | | 5 | – | 1 | – | 1 |
| Army | | – | | 8 | – | 2 | – | 0 |
| No. 8 Pittsburgh | | – | | 8 | – | 2 | – | 0 |
| No. 6 Carnegie Tech | | – | | 7 | – | 2 | – | 0 |
| No. 20 Dartmouth | | – | | 7 | – | 2 | – | 0 |
| Vermont | | – | | 4 | – | 2 | – | 1 |
| Brown | | – | | 5 | – | 3 | – | 0 |
| Bucknell | | – | | 5 | – | 3 | – | 0 |
| Syracuse | | – | | 5 | – | 3 | – | 0 |
| CCNY | | – | | 4 | – | 3 | – | 0 |
| Penn | | – | | 3 | – | 2 | – | 3 |
| Manhattan | | – | | 5 | – | 4 | – | 0 |
| Harvard | | – | | 4 | – | 4 | – | 0 |
| La Salle | | – | | 4 | – | 4 | – | 0 |
| NYU | | – | | 4 | – | 4 | – | 0 |
| Boston University | | – | | 3 | – | 4 | – | 1 |
| Penn State | | – | | 3 | – | 4 | – | 1 |
| Princeton | | – | | 3 | – | 4 | – | 1 |
| Hofstra | | – | | 2 | – | 3 | – | 1 |
| Duquesne | | – | | 4 | – | 6 | – | 0 |
| Temple | | – | | 3 | – | 6 | – | 1 |
| Providence | | – | | 3 | – | 5 | – | 0 |
| Columbia | | – | | 3 | – | 6 | – | 0 |
| Massachusetts State | | – | | 3 | – | 6 | – | 0 |
| Colgate | | – | | 2 | – | 5 | – | 0 |
| Buffalo | | – | | 2 | – | 6 | – | 0 |
| Yale | | – | | 2 | – | 6 | – | 0 |
| Tufts | | – | | 1 | – | 6 | – | 1 |
Rankings from AP Poll

The 1938 Buffalo Bulls football team was an American football team that represented the University of Buffalo as an independent during the 1938 college football season. In their third season under head coach Jim Peele, the Bulls compiled a 2–6 record and was outscored by a total of 156 to 81. The team played its home games at Rotary Field in Buffalo, New York.

== Schedule ==
| Date | Opponent | Site | Result | Attendance | Source |
|---|---|---|---|---|---|
| October 1 | at CCNY | Lewisohn Stadium; New York, NY | L 2–15 | 5,000 | |
| October 8 | Manchester | Rotary Field; Buffalo, NY | L 6–21 | | |
| October 15 | at Alfred | Alfred, NY | L 0–7 | | |
| October 22 | at Kent State | Rockwell Field; Kent, OH | L 0–52 | | |
| October 29 | Allegheny | Rotary Field; Buffalo, NY | W 47–0 | | |
| November 5 | Hobart^{†} | Rotary Field; Buffalo, NY | L 0–19 | 3,500 | |
| November 12 | at Wayne | Keyworth Stadium; Detroit, MI | L 0–35 | 6,500 | |
| November 19 | RPI | Rotary Field; Buffalo, NY | W 26–7 | | |
^{†}Homecoming
