= 1938 Penn State Nittany Lions football team =

American college football season

1938 Penn State Nittany Lions football
- Conference: Independent
- Record: 3–4–1
- Head coach: Bob Higgins (9th season)
- Captain: Dean Hanley
- Home stadium: New Beaver Field

1938 Eastern college football independents records
	Conf.			Overall
Team	W	L	T	W		L		T
Worcester Tech		–		6	–	0	–	0
No. 18 Villanova		–		8	–	0	–	1
No. 9 Holy Cross		–		8	–	1	–	0
Boston College		–		6	–	1	–	2
No. 15 Fordham		–		6	–	1	–	2
No. 12 Cornell		–		5	–	1	–	1
Army		–		8	–	2	–	0
No. 8 Pittsburgh		–		8	–	2	–	0
No. 6 Carnegie Tech		–		7	–	2	–	0
No. 20 Dartmouth		–		7	–	2	–	0
Vermont		–		4	–	2	–	1
Brown		–		5	–	3	–	0
Bucknell		–		5	–	3	–	0
Syracuse		–		5	–	3	–	0
CCNY		–		4	–	3	–	0
Penn		–		3	–	2	–	3
Manhattan		–		5	–	4	–	0
Harvard		–		4	–	4	–	0
La Salle		–		4	–	4	–	0
NYU		–		4	–	4	–	0
Boston University		–		3	–	4	–	1
Penn State		–		3	–	4	–	1
Princeton		–		3	–	4	–	1
Hofstra		–		2	–	3	–	1
Duquesne		–		4	–	6	–	0
Temple		–		3	–	6	–	1
Providence		–		3	–	5	–	0
Columbia		–		3	–	6	–	0
Massachusetts State		–		3	–	6	–	0
Colgate		–		2	–	5	–	0
Buffalo		–		2	–	6	–	0
Yale		–		2	–	6	–	0
Tufts		–		1	–	6	–	1
Rankings from AP Poll

The 1938 Penn State Nittany Lions football team represented the Pennsylvania State University as an independent during the 1938 college football season. The team was coached by Bob Higgins and played its home games in New Beaver Field in State College, Pennsylvania.

== Schedule ==
Date	Opponent	Site	Result	Attendance	Source
October 1	Maryland	New Beaver Field; State College, PA (rivalry)	W 33–0	9,846	
October 8	Bucknell^{†}	New Beaver Field; State College, PA	L 0–14	12,071	
October 15	at Lehigh	Taylor Stadium; Bethlehem, PA	W 59–6		
October 22	at Cornell	Schoellkopf Field; Ithaca, NY	L 6–21	7,000	
October 29	Syracuse	New Beaver Field; State College, PA (rivalry)	W 33–6	10,659	
November 5	Lafayette	New Beaver Field; State College, PA	L 0–7	8,274	
November 12	at Penn	Franklin Field; Philadelphia, PA	T 7–7	50,000	
November 19	at No. 5 Pittsburgh	Pitt Stadium; Pittsburgh, PA (rivalry)	L 0–26	14,000–16,881	
^{†}Homecoming; Rankings from AP Poll released prior to the game
