= 1938 Boston University Terriers football team =

American college football season

1938 Boston University Terriers football
- Conference: Independent
- Record: 3–4–1
- Head coach: Pat Hanley (5th season)
- Home stadium: Fenway Park, Nickerson Field

1938 Eastern college football independents records
	Conf.			Overall
Team	W	L	T	W		L		T
Worcester Tech		–		6	–	0	–	0
No. 18 Villanova		–		8	–	0	–	1
No. 9 Holy Cross		–		8	–	1	–	0
Boston College		–		6	–	1	–	2
No. 15 Fordham		–		6	–	1	–	2
No. 12 Cornell		–		5	–	1	–	1
Army		–		8	–	2	–	0
No. 8 Pittsburgh		–		8	–	2	–	0
No. 6 Carnegie Tech		–		7	–	2	–	0
No. 20 Dartmouth		–		7	–	2	–	0
Vermont		–		4	–	2	–	1
Brown		–		5	–	3	–	0
Bucknell		–		5	–	3	–	0
Syracuse		–		5	–	3	–	0
CCNY		–		4	–	3	–	0
Penn		–		3	–	2	–	3
Manhattan		–		5	–	4	–	0
Harvard		–		4	–	4	–	0
La Salle		–		4	–	4	–	0
NYU		–		4	–	4	–	0
Boston University		–		3	–	4	–	1
Penn State		–		3	–	4	–	1
Princeton		–		3	–	4	–	1
Hofstra		–		2	–	3	–	1
Duquesne		–		4	–	6	–	0
Temple		–		3	–	6	–	1
Providence		–		3	–	5	–	0
Columbia		–		3	–	6	–	0
Massachusetts State		–		3	–	6	–	0
Colgate		–		2	–	5	–	0
Buffalo		–		2	–	6	–	0
Yale		–		2	–	6	–	0
Tufts		–		1	–	6	–	1
Rankings from AP Poll

The 1938 Boston University Terriers football team was an American football team that represented Boston University as an independent during the 1938 college football season. In its fifth season under head coach Pat Hanley, the team compiled a 3–4–1 record and outscored opponents by a total of 174 to 107.

== Schedule ==
Date	Opponent	Site	Result	Attendance	Source
October 1	at Lehigh	Taylor Stadium; Bethlehem, PA	T 6–6		
October 8	St. Lawrence	Fenway Park; Boston, MA	W 19–14		
October 15	Upsala	Fenway Park; Boston, MA	W 25–0	5,000–10,000	
October 22	at Army	Michie Stadium; West Point, NY	L 0–40		
October 29	at Western Reserve	League Park; Cleveland, OH	L 6–47	12,000	
November 5	Tampa	Nickerson Field; Weston, MA	W 31–7		
November 11	Boston College	Fenway Park; Boston, MA (rivalry)	L 14–21	15,000	
November 19	No. 15 Villanova	Fenway Park; Boston, MA	L 6–39		
Rankings from AP Poll released prior to the game
