= 1938 Temple Owls football team =

American college football season

1938 Temple Owls football
- Conference: Independent
- Record: 3–6–1
- Head coach: Pop Warner (6th season)
- Captain: Richard Wheeler
- Home stadium: Temple Stadium

1938 Eastern college football independents records
	Conf.			Overall
Team	W	L	T	W		L		T
Worcester Tech		–		6	–	0	–	0
No. 18 Villanova		–		8	–	0	–	1
No. 9 Holy Cross		–		8	–	1	–	0
Boston College		–		6	–	1	–	2
No. 15 Fordham		–		6	–	1	–	2
No. 12 Cornell		–		5	–	1	–	1
Army		–		8	–	2	–	0
No. 8 Pittsburgh		–		8	–	2	–	0
No. 6 Carnegie Tech		–		7	–	2	–	0
No. 20 Dartmouth		–		7	–	2	–	0
Vermont		–		4	–	2	–	1
Brown		–		5	–	3	–	0
Bucknell		–		5	–	3	–	0
Syracuse		–		5	–	3	–	0
CCNY		–		4	–	3	–	0
Penn		–		3	–	2	–	3
Manhattan		–		5	–	4	–	0
Harvard		–		4	–	4	–	0
La Salle		–		4	–	4	–	0
NYU		–		4	–	4	–	0
Boston University		–		3	–	4	–	1
Penn State		–		3	–	4	–	1
Princeton		–		3	–	4	–	1
Hofstra		–		2	–	3	–	1
Duquesne		–		4	–	6	–	0
Temple		–		3	–	6	–	1
Providence		–		3	–	5	–	0
Columbia		–		3	–	6	–	0
Massachusetts State		–		3	–	6	–	0
Colgate		–		2	–	5	–	0
Buffalo		–		2	–	6	–	0
Yale		–		2	–	6	–	0
Tufts		–		1	–	6	–	1
Rankings from AP Poll

The 1938 Temple Owls football team was an American football team that represented Temple University as an independent during the 1938 college football season. In its sixth season under head coach Pop Warner, the team compiled a 3–6–1 record and was outscored by a total of 170 to 97. The team played its home games at Temple Stadium in Philadelphia. Richard Wheeler was the team captain.

After the 1938 season, Warner retired from coaching at age 67. He had been a football coach since 1895, compiling a 319–106–32 record.

== Schedule ==
Date	Opponent	Site	Result	Attendance	Source
September 23	Albright	Temple Stadium; Philadelphia, PA	W 6–0		
October 1	Pittsburgh	Temple Stadium; Philadelphia, PA	L 6–28	41,728	
October 7	TCU	Temple Stadium; Philadelphia, PA	L 6–28	20,000	
October 14	Bucknell	Temple Stadium; Philadelphia, PA	W 26–0		
October 21	Boston College	Temple Stadium; Philadelphia, PA	T 26–26	12,000	
October 28	Georgetown	Temple Stadium; Philadelphia, PA	L 0–13	10,000	
November 5	at No. 13 Holy Cross	Fitton Field; Worcester, MA	L 0–33		
November 12	No. 19 Villanova	Temple Stadium; Philadelphia, PA	L 7–20		
November 19	at Michigan State	Macklin Field; East Lansing, MI	L 0–10	12,000	
December 3	at Florida	Florida Field; Gainesville, FL	W 7–6		
Rankings from AP Poll released prior to the game
