= 1938 Duquesne Dukes football team =

American college football season

1938 Duquesne Dukes football
- Conference: Independent
- Record: 4–6
- Head coach: Clipper Smith (3rd season)
- Home stadium: Forbes Field

1938 Eastern college football independents records
	Conf.			Overall
Team	W	L	T	W		L		T
Worcester Tech		–		6	–	0	–	0
No. 18 Villanova		–		8	–	0	–	1
No. 9 Holy Cross		–		8	–	1	–	0
Boston College		–		6	–	1	–	2
No. 15 Fordham		–		6	–	1	–	2
No. 12 Cornell		–		5	–	1	–	1
Army		–		8	–	2	–	0
No. 8 Pittsburgh		–		8	–	2	–	0
No. 6 Carnegie Tech		–		7	–	2	–	0
No. 20 Dartmouth		–		7	–	2	–	0
Vermont		–		4	–	2	–	1
Brown		–		5	–	3	–	0
Bucknell		–		5	–	3	–	0
Syracuse		–		5	–	3	–	0
CCNY		–		4	–	3	–	0
Penn		–		3	–	2	–	3
Manhattan		–		5	–	4	–	0
Harvard		–		4	–	4	–	0
La Salle		–		4	–	4	–	0
NYU		–		4	–	4	–	0
Boston University		–		3	–	4	–	1
Penn State		–		3	–	4	–	1
Princeton		–		3	–	4	–	1
Hofstra		–		2	–	3	–	1
Duquesne		–		4	–	6	–	0
Temple		–		3	–	6	–	1
Providence		–		3	–	5	–	0
Columbia		–		3	–	6	–	0
Massachusetts State		–		3	–	6	–	0
Colgate		–		2	–	5	–	0
Buffalo		–		2	–	6	–	0
Yale		–		2	–	6	–	0
Tufts		–		1	–	6	–	1
Rankings from AP Poll

The 1938 Duquesne Dukes football team was an American football team that represented Duquesne University as an independent during the 1938 college football season. In its third and final season under head coach Clipper Smith, Duquesne compiled a 4–6 record and was outscored by a total of 114 to 96. The team played its home games at Forbes Field in Pittsburgh.

== Schedule ==
Date	Opponent	Site	Result	Attendance	Source
September 23	Waynesburg	Pittsburgh, PA	W 34–7		
September 30	vs. Texas Tech	Civic Stadium; Buffalo, NY	L 6–7	12,000	
October 8	at Pittsburgh	Pitt Stadium; Pittsburgh, PA	L 0–27	36,000–37,000	
October 14	West Virginia Wesleyan	Pittsburgh, PA	W 13–0		
October 21	Mississippi State	Forbes Field; Pittsburgh, PA	L 7–12	12,000	
October 28	Detroit	Forbes Field; Pittsburgh, PA	W 14–6	9,000	
November 5	at South Carolina	Carolina Municipal Stadium; Columbia, SC	L 0–7	7,000	
November 12	at No. 12 Carnegie Tech	Pitt Stadium; Pittsburgh, PA	L 0–21		
November 18	at Miami (FL)	Burdine Stadium; Miami, FL	L 7–21	13,296	
November 24	Niagara	Pittsburgh, PA	W 15–6		
Rankings from AP Poll released prior to the game
