= 1938 Army Cadets football team =

American college football season

1938 Army Cadets football
- Conference: Independent
- Record: 8–2
- Head coach: William H. Wood (1st season)
- Captain: James Schwenk
- Home stadium: Michie Stadium

1938 Eastern college football independents records
	Conf.			Overall
Team	W	L	T	W		L		T
Worcester Tech		–		6	–	0	–	0
No. 18 Villanova		–		8	–	0	–	1
No. 9 Holy Cross		–		8	–	1	–	0
Boston College		–		6	–	1	–	2
No. 15 Fordham		–		6	–	1	–	2
No. 12 Cornell		–		5	–	1	–	1
Army		–		8	–	2	–	0
No. 8 Pittsburgh		–		8	–	2	–	0
No. 6 Carnegie Tech		–		7	–	2	–	0
No. 20 Dartmouth		–		7	–	2	–	0
Vermont		–		4	–	2	–	1
Brown		–		5	–	3	–	0
Bucknell		–		5	–	3	–	0
Syracuse		–		5	–	3	–	0
CCNY		–		4	–	3	–	0
Penn		–		3	–	2	–	3
Manhattan		–		5	–	4	–	0
Harvard		–		4	–	4	–	0
La Salle		–		4	–	4	–	0
NYU		–		4	–	4	–	0
Boston University		–		3	–	4	–	1
Penn State		–		3	–	4	–	1
Princeton		–		3	–	4	–	1
Hofstra		–		2	–	3	–	1
Duquesne		–		4	–	6	–	0
Temple		–		3	–	6	–	1
Providence		–		3	–	5	–	0
Columbia		–		3	–	6	–	0
Massachusetts State		–		3	–	6	–	0
Colgate		–		2	–	5	–	0
Buffalo		–		2	–	6	–	0
Yale		–		2	–	6	–	0
Tufts		–		1	–	6	–	1
Rankings from AP Poll

The 1938 Army Cadets football team represented the United States Military Academy as an independent during the 1938 college football season. In their first year under head coach William H. Wood, the Cadets compiled an 8–2 record and outscored their opponents by a combined total of 243 to 95. In the annual Army–Navy Game, the Cadets defeated the Midshipmen by a 14 to 7 score. The Cadets' two losses came against Columbia and Notre Dame, and were unranked in the AP poll.

No Army players were recognized on the All-America team.

== Schedule ==
Date	Opponent	Site	Result	Attendance	Source
September 24	Wichita	Michie Stadium; West Point, NY	W 32–0	5,000	
October 1	VPI	Michie Stadium; West Point, NY	W 39–0		
October 8	Columbia	Michie Stadium; West Point, NY	L 18–20	25,000	
October 15	at Harvard	Harvard Stadium; Boston, MA	W 20–17	55,000	
October 22	Boston University	Michie Stadium; West Point, NY	W 40–0		
October 29	vs. No. 7 Notre Dame	Yankee Stadium; Bronx, NY (rivalry)	L 7–19	76,338	
November 5	Franklin & Marshall	Michie Stadium; West Point, NY	W 20–12		
November 12	Chattanooga	Michie Stadium; West Point, NY	W 34–13	12,000	
November 19	Princeton	Michie Stadium; West Point, NY	W 19–7		
November 26	vs. Navy	Philadelphia Municipal Stadium; Philadelphia, PA (Army–Navy Game)	W 14–7		
Rankings from AP Poll released prior to the game
