= 1938 Vermont Catamounts football team =

American college football season

1938 Vermont Catamounts football
- Conference: Independent
- Record: 4–2–1
- Head coach: John P. Sabo (5th season)
- Home stadium: Centennial Field

1938 Eastern college football independents records
	Conf.			Overall
Team	W	L	T	W		L		T
Worcester Tech		–		6	–	0	–	0
No. 18 Villanova		–		8	–	0	–	1
No. 9 Holy Cross		–		8	–	1	–	0
Boston College		–		6	–	1	–	2
No. 15 Fordham		–		6	–	1	–	2
No. 12 Cornell		–		5	–	1	–	1
Army		–		8	–	2	–	0
No. 8 Pittsburgh		–		8	–	2	–	0
No. 6 Carnegie Tech		–		7	–	2	–	0
No. 20 Dartmouth		–		7	–	2	–	0
Vermont		–		4	–	2	–	1
Brown		–		5	–	3	–	0
Bucknell		–		5	–	3	–	0
Syracuse		–		5	–	3	–	0
CCNY		–		4	–	3	–	0
Penn		–		3	–	2	–	3
Manhattan		–		5	–	4	–	0
Harvard		–		4	–	4	–	0
La Salle		–		4	–	4	–	0
NYU		–		4	–	4	–	0
Boston University		–		3	–	4	–	1
Penn State		–		3	–	4	–	1
Princeton		–		3	–	4	–	1
Hofstra		–		2	–	3	–	1
Duquesne		–		4	–	6	–	0
Temple		–		3	–	6	–	1
Providence		–		3	–	5	–	0
Columbia		–		3	–	6	–	0
Massachusetts State		–		3	–	6	–	0
Colgate		–		2	–	5	–	0
Buffalo		–		2	–	6	–	0
Yale		–		2	–	6	–	0
Tufts		–		1	–	6	–	1
Rankings from AP Poll

The 1938 Vermont Catamounts football team was an American football team that represented the University of Vermont as an independent during the 1938 college football season. In their fifth year under head coach John P. Sabo, the team compiled a 4–2–1 record. Their season opening game against Trinity (CT) was canceled due to poor travel conditions between Hartford and Burlington.

== Schedule ==
Date	Opponent	Site	Result	Attendance	Source
October 1	at Rutgers	Neilson Field; New Brunswick, NJ	L 14–15	7,000	
October 8	Colby	Centennial Field; Burlington, VT	W 9–6		
October 15	at Union (NY)	Alexander Field; Schenectady, NY	T 7–7		
October 22	New Hampshire	Centennial Field; Burlington, VT	W 20–0	2,500	
October 29	Norwich	Centennial Field; Burlington, VT	W 20–6		
November 5	at St. Lawrence	Weeks Field; Canton, NY	W 12–0	1,000	
November 12	at Middlebury	Porter Field; Middlebury, VT	L 0–7		
