= 1938 Worcester Tech Engineers football team =

American college football season

1938 Worcester Tech Engineers football
- Conference: Independent
- Record: 6–0
- Head coach: Ivan Bigler (16th season)
- Home stadium: Alumni Stadium

1938 Eastern college football independents records
	Conf.			Overall
Team	W	L	T	W		L		T
Worcester Tech		–		6	–	0	–	0
No. 18 Villanova		–		8	–	0	–	1
No. 9 Holy Cross		–		8	–	1	–	0
Boston College		–		6	–	1	–	2
No. 15 Fordham		–		6	–	1	–	2
No. 12 Cornell		–		5	–	1	–	1
Army		–		8	–	2	–	0
No. 8 Pittsburgh		–		8	–	2	–	0
No. 6 Carnegie Tech		–		7	–	2	–	0
No. 20 Dartmouth		–		7	–	2	–	0
Vermont		–		4	–	2	–	1
Brown		–		5	–	3	–	0
Bucknell		–		5	–	3	–	0
Syracuse		–		5	–	3	–	0
CCNY		–		4	–	3	–	0
Penn		–		3	–	2	–	3
Manhattan		–		5	–	4	–	0
Harvard		–		4	–	4	–	0
La Salle		–		4	–	4	–	0
NYU		–		4	–	4	–	0
Boston University		–		3	–	4	–	1
Penn State		–		3	–	4	–	1
Princeton		–		3	–	4	–	1
Hofstra		–		2	–	3	–	1
Duquesne		–		4	–	6	–	0
Temple		–		3	–	6	–	1
Providence		–		3	–	5	–	0
Columbia		–		3	–	6	–	0
Massachusetts State		–		3	–	6	–	0
Colgate		–		2	–	5	–	0
Buffalo		–		2	–	6	–	0
Yale		–		2	–	6	–	0
Tufts		–		1	–	6	–	1
Rankings from AP Poll

The 1938 Worcester Tech Engineers football team was an American football team that represented the Worcester Polytechnic Institute (WPI) as an independent during the 1938 college football season. In their 16th year under head coach Ivan Bigler, the Engineers compiled a 6–0 record and outscored opponents by a total of 66 to 29. The 1938 season was the first perfect season in Worcester Tech's football history, others following in 1954 and 1983.

== Schedule ==
Date	Opponent	Site	Result	Attendance	Source
October 1	Coast Guard	Alumni Stadium; Worcester, MA	W 9–0		
October 8	Trinity (CT)	Alumni Stadium; Worcester, MA	W 12–6		
October 15	at American International	Springfield, MA	W 6–2		
October 22	at Massachusetts State	Alumni Field; Amherst, MA	W 6–0		
October 29	at Rhode Island State	Meade Stadium; Kingston, RI	W 19–14		
November 5	Rensselaer Tech	Alumni Stadium; Worcester, MA	W 14–7		
