= 1938 college football season =

American college football season

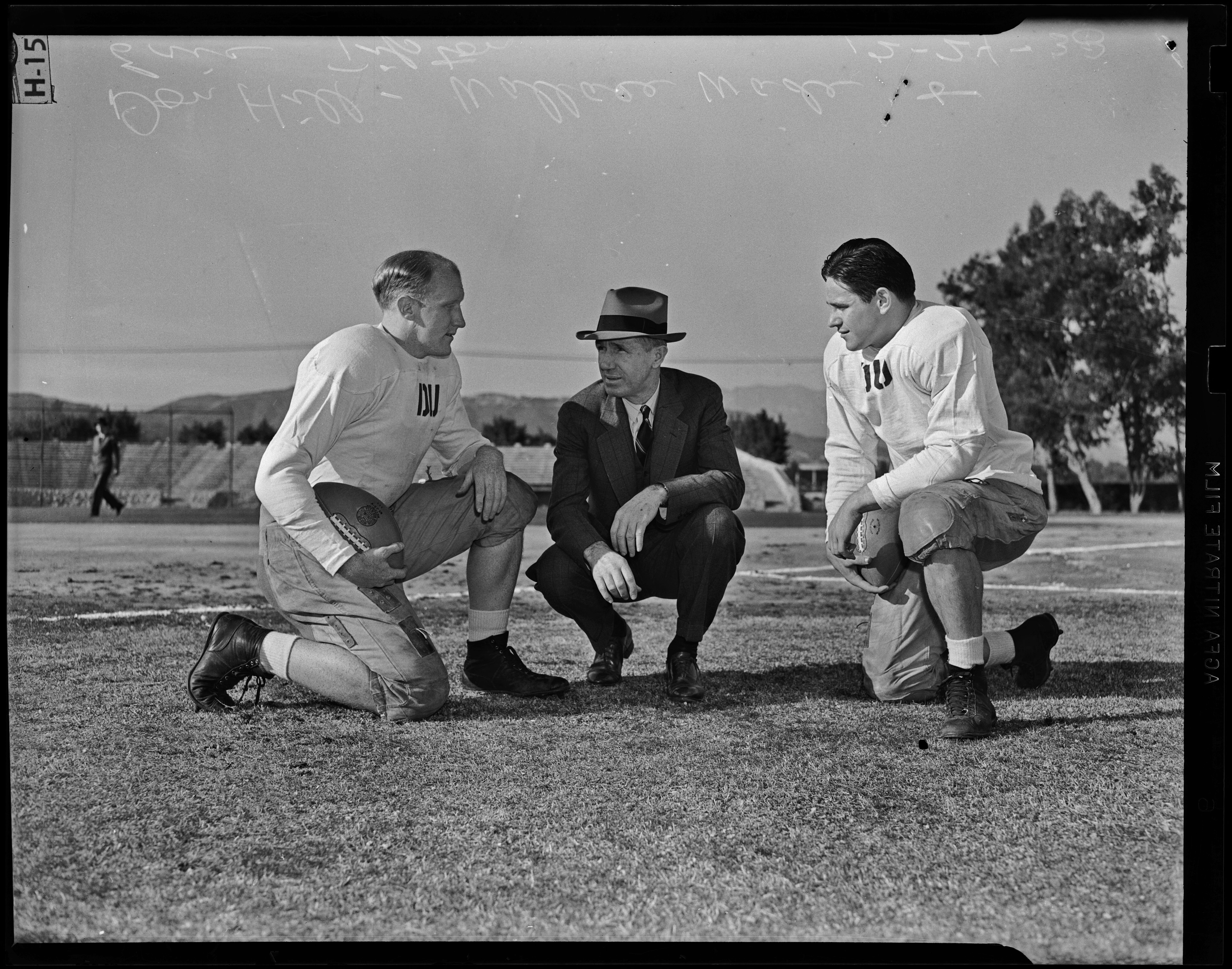
- Coach Wallace Wade of the Duke Blue Devils, with Dan Hill and Eric Tipton
- First AP No. 1 of season: Pittsburgh
- Number of bowls: 5
- Champion(s): TCU (Note: per AP poll, Williamson System, Helms Athletic Foundation, National Championship Foundation); Tennessee (Note: per Boand System, Dunkel System, Houlgate System, Litkenhous Ratings, Poling System, Berryman QPRS, Billingsley Report, College Football Researchers Association, Sagarin Ratings Elo chess method, and Sagarin Ratings Predictor method); Notre Dame (Note: per Dickinson System) (not claimed)
- Heisman: Davey O'Brien, (quarterback, TCU)

The 1938 college football season ended with the Horned Frogs of Texas Christian University (TCU) being named the nation's No. 1 team by 55 of the 77 voters in the final Associated Press writers' poll in early December. Tennessee was also chosen by six contemporary math system selectors as a national champion; both teams won every game. Notre Dame was chosen by the Dickinson System and won the Knute Rockne Memorial Trophy.

== Conference and program changes ==
=== Conference changes ===
- Two conferences began play during 1938:
  - Alabama Intercollegiate Conference – active through the 1959 season
  - Mountain States Conference – an NCAA University Division conference active through the 1961 season; also known as the Big Seven and Skyline Conference
- One conference changed its name in 1938:
  - The Tri-Normal League changed its name to the Washington Intercollegiate Conference

=== Membership changes ===
School	1937 Conference	1938 Conference
BYU Cougars	Rocky Mountain	Mountain States (Big Seven)
Colorado Buffaloes	Rocky Mountain	Mountain States (Big Seven)
Colorado A&M Rams	Rocky Mountain	Mountain States (Big Seven)
Denver Pioneers	Rocky Mountain	Mountain States (Big Seven)
Utah Utes	Rocky Mountain	Mountain States (Big Seven)
Utah State Aggies	Rocky Mountain	Mountain States (Big Seven)
Wyoming Cowboys	Rocky Mountain	Mountain States (Big Seven)

== September ==
September 24 Defending champion Pittsburgh beat West Virginia, 19–0. California defeated St. Mary's 12–7. In Los Angeles, Alabama beat USC 19–7. Minnesota defeated Washington 15–0, and Dartmouth beat Bates 46–0.

== October ==
October 1 Alabama defeated Samford 34–0, Fordham beat Upsala 47–0, Dartmouth beat St Lawrence 51–0, and Notre Dame beat Kansas 52–0. Pitt defeated Temple 28–6, California beat Washington State 27–3, and Minnesota beat Nebraska 16–7.

October 8 Minnesota defeated Purdue 7–0. Alabama beat North Carolina State 14–0. Dartmouth stayed unscored upon, winning at Princeton 22–0. Pittsburgh beat cross-town rival Duquesne 27–0. Fordham beat Waynesburg College 53–0. California played a double-header for the fans, with the reserves beating the California Agricultural school (lager UC-Davis) 48–0, and the varsity and reserves beating College of the Pacific 39–0. In Atlanta, Notre Dame beat Georgia Tech 14–6.

October 15 Pittsburgh won at Wisconsin 26–6. California defeated UCLA 20–7. Dartmouth beat Brown 34–13, and Notre Dame beat Illinois 14–6. Minnesota edged Michigan, 7–6. Fordham was tied by Purdue 6–6, and in Birmingham, Alabama was shut out by Tennessee, 13–0. When the first round of balloting was finished, the defending champion Panthers were again No. 1, followed by Minnesota, California, Dartmouth, and Notre Dame.

October 22 No. 1 Pittsburgh beat SMU 34–7. No. 2 Minnesota was idle. No. 3 California won at Seattle over Washington 14–7. No. 4 Dartmouth won at Harvard 13–7. No. 5 Notre Dame beat No. 13 Carnegie Tech 7–0. No. 6 Santa Clara beat Arkansas 21–6 in San Francisco, while in Milwaukee, No. 7 TCU beat Marquette 21–0, and the two winners replaced Dartmouth and Notre Dame in the Top Five: No. 1 Pittsburgh, No. 2 Minnesota, No. 3 California, No. 4 TCU, and No. 5 Santa Clara.

October 29 No. 1 Pittsburgh beat No. 9 Fordham, 24–13. No. 2 Minnesota fell to No. 12 Northwestern, 6–3. No. 3 California beat Oregon State 13–7. No. 4 TCU beat Baylor 39–7, and No. 5 Santa Clara won at Michigan State 7–6. No. 6 Dartmouth won at Yale 24–6 and No. 7 Notre Dame beat Army in Yankee Stadium, 19–7, and both returned to the Top Five: No. 1 Pittsburgh, No. 2 TCU, No. 3 California, No. 4 Notre Dame, and No. 5 Dartmouth.

== November ==
November 5 In Pittsburgh, the No. 1 Panthers lost to No. 19 Carnegie Tech, 20–10. No. 2 TCU won at Tulsa 21–0. No. 3 California lost at No. 13 USC 13–7. In Baltimore, No. 4 Notre Dame beat Navy 15–0. No. 5 Dartmouth beat Dickinson College, 44–6. No. 6 Tennessee beat Chattanooga 45–0 to extend its record to 7–0–0. The Horned Frogs of TCU leaped into the top spot, ahead of Notre Dame, Pittsburgh, Tennessee, and Dartmouth.

November 12 No. 1 TCU beat Texas 28–6. No. 2 Notre Dame beat No. 12 Minnesota 19–0. No. 3 Pittsburgh beat Nebraska 19–0. No. 4 Tennessee won at Vanderbilt 14–0. No. 5 Dartmouth lost at No. 20 Cornell 14–7. No. 7 Duke remained unbeaten (7–0–0), untied, and unscored upon with a 21–0 win at Syracuse. In the next poll, the Irish moved up to the top rung, followed by TCU, Tennessee, Duke, and Pittsburgh.

November 19 No. 1 Notre Dame won at No. 16 Northwestern 9–7. No. 2 TCU won at Rice 29–7. No. 3 Tennessee was idle as it prepared for a holiday game. No. 4 Duke beat N.C. State, 7–0. No. 5 Pittsburgh beat Penn State 26–0. The rankings shuffled to No. 1 Notre Dame, No. 2 TCU, No. 3 Duke, No. 4 Pittsburgh, and No. 5 Tennessee.

On Thanksgiving Day No. 5 Tennessee beat Kentucky 46–0, while No. 6 Oklahoma beat Oklahoma A&M 19-0. Two days later, November 26, No. 1 Notre Dame remained idle. No. 2 TCU beat SMU in Dallas, 20–7. No. 3 Duke and No. 4 Pittsburgh met at Durham, with the hosts winning 7–0. With a record of 9–0–0, Duke had outscored its opponents 114–0, but stayed in third in the next set of rankings. On November 29 the "final" AP Poll was released with Notre Dame No. 1, followed by No. 2 TCU, No. 3 Duke, No. 4 Tennessee, and No. 5 Oklahoma.

On December 3, No. 1 Notre Dame lost in Los Angeles to No. 8 USC, 13–0. As a result the AP Poll was extended for another week. On December 6 previously No. 2-ranked TCU received 55 first place votes in the second final poll and accepted a bid to the Sugar Bowl. No. 4 Tennessee beat Ole Miss 47–0 in Memphis, and moved up to second place. Though the SEC champion would be Sugar Bowl bound in later years, a No. 1 vs. No. 2 match was not to be had, as Tennessee instead took a bid for the Orange Bowl. No. 3 Duke stayed in third place, despite having never been scored upon in 1938, and accepted an invitation to the Rose Bowl. No. 5 Oklahoma beat Washington State 28–0 and moved up to fourth place. Both unbeaten and untied at 10–0–0, Tennessee and Oklahoma would meet in Miami, but the title had been awarded to 10–0–0 TCU. Notre Dame fell to fifth place.

== Conference standings ==
=== Major conference standings ===
1938 Big Six Conference football standings
	Conf.					Overall
Team	W		L		T	W		L		T
No. 4 Oklahoma $	5	–	0	–	0	10	–	1	–	0
Iowa State	3	–	1	–	1	7	–	1	–	1
Missouri	2	–	3	–	0	6	–	3	–	0
Nebraska	2	–	3	–	0	3	–	5	–	1
Kansas State	1	–	3	–	1	4	–	4	–	1
Kansas	1	–	4	–	0	3	–	6	–	0
$ – Conference champion; Rankings from AP Poll

1938 Big Ten Conference football standings
	Conf.					Overall
Team	W		L		T	W		L		T
No. 10 Minnesota $	4	–	1	–	0	6	–	2	–	0
No. 16 Michigan	3	–	1	–	1	6	–	1	–	1
Purdue	3	–	1	–	1	5	–	1	–	2
No. 17 Northwestern	2	–	1	–	2	4	–	2	–	2
Wisconsin	3	–	2	–	0	5	–	3	–	0
Ohio State	3	–	2	–	1	4	–	3	–	1
Illinois	2	–	3	–	0	3	–	5	–	0
Iowa	1	–	3	–	1	1	–	6	–	1
Indiana	1	–	4	–	0	1	–	6	–	1
Chicago	0	–	4	–	0	1	–	6	–	1
$ – Conference champion; Rankings from AP Poll

1938 Border Conference football standings
	Conf.					Overall
Team	W		L		T	W		L		T
New Mexico A&M +	4	–	1	–	0	7	–	2	–	0
New Mexico +	4	–	2	–	0	8	–	3	–	0
No. 11 Texas Tech	2	–	0	–	0	10	–	1	–	0
Texas Mines	3	–	2	–	0	6	–	3	–	0
Arizona State–Flagstaff	1	–	2	–	0	2	–	6	–	1
Arizona	0	–	3	–	0	3	–	6	–	0
Arizona State	0	–	4	–	0	3	–	6	–	0
+ – Conference co-champions; Rankings from AP Poll

1938 Mountain States Conference football standings
	Conf.					Overall
Team	W		L		T	W		L		T
Utah $	4	–	0	–	2	7	–	1	–	2
BYU	3	–	2	–	1	4	–	3	–	1
Denver	3	–	2	–	1	4	–	4	–	1
Colorado	3	–	2	–	1	3	–	4	–	1
Utah State	3	–	3	–	0	4	–	4	–	0
Wyoming	1	–	4	–	1	2	–	5	–	1
Colorado A&M	0	–	4	–	2	1	–	5	–	2
$ – Conference champion

1938 Pacific Coast Conference football standings
	Conf.					Overall
Team	W		L		T	W		L		T
No. 7 USC +	6	–	1	–	0	9	–	2	–	0
No. 14 California +	6	–	1	–	0	10	–	1	–	0
UCLA	4	–	3	–	1	7	–	4	–	1
Oregon State	4	–	3	–	1	5	–	3	–	1
Oregon	4	–	4	–	0	4	–	5	–	0
Washington	3	–	4	–	1	3	–	5	–	1
Idaho	2	–	3	–	1	6	–	3	–	1
Stanford	2	–	5	–	0	3	–	6	–	0
Washington State	1	–	7	–	0	2	–	8	–	0
Montana	0	–	1	–	0	5	–	3	–	1
+ – Conference co-champions; Rankings from AP Poll

1938 Southeastern Conference football standings
	Conf.					Overall
Team		W		L			W		L
No. 2 Tennessee $	7	–	0	–	0	11	–	0	–	0
No. 13 Alabama	4	–	1	–	1	7	–	1	–	1
No. 19 Tulane	4	–	1	–	1	7	–	2	–	1
Ole Miss	3	–	2	–	0	9	–	2	–	0
Georgia Tech	2	–	1	–	3	3	–	4	–	3
Vanderbilt	4	–	3	–	0	6	–	3	–	0
Florida	2	–	2	–	1	4	–	6	–	1
Auburn	3	–	3	–	1	4	–	5	–	1
Georgia	1	–	2	–	1	5	–	4	–	1
LSU	2	–	4	–	0	6	–	4	–	0
Mississippi State	1	–	4	–	0	4	–	6	–	0
Kentucky	0	–	4	–	0	2	–	7	–	0
Sewanee	0	–	6	–	0	1	–	8	–	0
$ – Conference champion; Rankings from AP Poll

1938 Southern Conference football standings
	Conf.					Overall
Team	W		L		T	W		L		T
No. 3 Duke $	5	–	0	–	0	9	–	1	–	0
Clemson	3	–	0	–	1	7	–	1	–	1
VMI	4	–	0	–	3	6	–	1	–	4
North Carolina	4	–	1	–	0	6	–	2	–	1
Richmond	3	–	2	–	1	6	–	3	–	1
Washington and Lee	2	–	2	–	0	4	–	4	–	1
NC State	3	–	3	–	1	3	–	7	–	1
South Carolina	2	–	2	–	0	6	–	4	–	1
Wake Forest	3	–	4	–	1	4	–	5	–	1
VPI	2	–	3	–	2	3	–	5	–	2
The Citadel	2	–	3	–	0	6	–	5	–	0
Maryland	1	–	2	–	0	2	–	7	–	0
Davidson	2	–	6	–	0	4	–	6	–	0
Furman	0	–	4	–	1	2	–	7	–	1
William & Mary	0	–	4	–	0	3	–	7	–	0
$ – Conference champion; Rankings from AP Poll

1938 Southwest Conference football standings
	Conf.					Overall
Team	W		L		T	W		L		T
No. 1 TCU $	6	–	0	–	0	11	–	0	–	0
SMU	4	–	2	–	0	6	–	4	–	0
Baylor	3	–	2	–	1	7	–	2	–	1
Rice	3	–	3	–	0	4	–	6	–	0
Texas A&M	2	–	3	–	1	4	–	4	–	1
Arkansas	1	–	5	–	0	2	–	7	–	1
Texas	1	–	5	–	0	1	–	8	–	0
$ – Conference champion; Rankings from AP Poll

=== Independents ===
1938 Eastern college football independents records
	Conf.			Overall
Team	W	L	T	W		L		T
Worcester Tech		–		6	–	0	–	0
No. 18 Villanova		–		8	–	0	–	1
No. 9 Holy Cross		–		8	–	1	–	0
Boston College		–		6	–	1	–	2
No. 15 Fordham		–		6	–	1	–	2
No. 12 Cornell		–		5	–	1	–	1
Army		–		8	–	2	–	0
No. 8 Pittsburgh		–		8	–	2	–	0
No. 6 Carnegie Tech		–		7	–	2	–	0
No. 20 Dartmouth		–		7	–	2	–	0
Vermont		–		4	–	2	–	1
Brown		–		5	–	3	–	0
Bucknell		–		5	–	3	–	0
Syracuse		–		5	–	3	–	0
CCNY		–		4	–	3	–	0
Penn		–		3	–	2	–	3
Manhattan		–		5	–	4	–	0
Harvard		–		4	–	4	–	0
La Salle		–		4	–	4	–	0
NYU		–		4	–	4	–	0
Boston University		–		3	–	4	–	1
Penn State		–		3	–	4	–	1
Princeton		–		3	–	4	–	1
Hofstra		–		2	–	3	–	1
Duquesne		–		4	–	6	–	0
Temple		–		3	–	6	–	1
Providence		–		3	–	5	–	0
Columbia		–		3	–	6	–	0
Massachusetts State		–		3	–	6	–	0
Colgate		–		2	–	5	–	0
Buffalo		–		2	–	6	–	0
Yale		–		2	–	6	–	0
Tufts		–		1	–	6	–	1
Rankings from AP Poll

1938 Midwestern college football independents records
	Conf.			Overall
Team	W	L	T	W		L		T
No. 5 Notre Dame		–		8	–	1	–	0
Central Michigan		–		7	–	1	–	0
Michigan State Normal		–		6	–	1	–	1
Xavier		–		7	–	2	–	0
Akron		–		6	–	3	–	0
Michigan State		–		6	–	3	–	0
Detroit Tech		–		6	–	3	–	0
Detroit		–		6	–	4	–	0
Western State Teachers		–		4	–	3	–	0
Cincinnati		–		4	–	5	–	0
Haskell		–		2	–	6	–	0
Wayne		–		2	–	6	–	0
DePaul		–		2	–	7	–	0
Michigan Tech		–		1	–	5	–	0
Marquette		–		1	–	7	–	0
Rankings from AP poll

1938 Southern college football independents records
	Conf.			Overall
Team	W	L	T	W		L		T
Georgetown		–		8	–	0	–	0
Hardin–Simmons		–		8	–	2	–	0
Roanoke		–		5	–	2	–	3
Western Maryland		–		5	–	2	–	1
Catholic University		–		5	–	3	–	0
George Washington		–		5	–	4	–	0
Navy		–		4	–	3	–	2
Virginia		–		4	–	4	–	1
West Virginia		–		4	–	5	–	1
Loyola (LA)		–		4	–	5	–	0
South Georgia Teachers		–		3	–	5	–	1
William & Mary Norfolk		–		3	–	5	–	1
Delaware		–		3	–	5	–	0
Delaware State		–		1	–	2	–	0
Oklahoma City		–		2	–	8	–	0
East Carolina		–		1	–	6	–	1

1938 Western college football independents records
	Conf.			Overall
Team	W	L	T	W		L		T
San Jose State		–		11	–	1	–	0
Cal Poly		–		7	–	2	–	0
Santa Clara		–		6	–	2	–	0
Saint Mary's		–		6	–	2	–	0
San Francisco		–		5	–	2	–	1
Humboldt State		–		4	–	2	–	0
Idaho Southern Branch		–		4	–	3	–	0
Portland		–		5	–	3	–	0
Hawaii		–		4	–	4	–	0
Loyola (CA)		–		4	–	5	–	0
San Francisco State		–		2	–	5	–	0
La Verne		–		1	–	4	–	0
Santa Barbara State		–		2	–	8	–	0
Gonzaga		–		1	–	7	–	0

=== Minor conferences ===
Conference	Champion(s)	Record
Alamo Conference	Texas A&I	
Central Intercollegiate Athletics Association	Virginia State College	6–0–1
Central Intercollegiate Athletic Conference	Wichita	4–0
Far Western Conference	Pacific (CA)	4–0
Indiana Intercollegiate Conference	Manchester College	6–1
Iowa Intercollegiate Athletic Conference	Luther	4–0–1
Kansas Collegiate Athletic Conference	Ottawa (KS)	5–0
Lone Star Conference	East Texas State Teachers	4–0
Michigan Intercollegiate Athletic Association	Hillsdale	4–0
Michigan-Ontario Collegiate Conference	Lawrence Technological University	3–0
Midwest Collegiate Athletic Conference	Lawrence	5–0
Minnesota Intercollegiate Athletic Conference	Saint John's	5–0
Missouri Intercollegiate Athletic Association	Northwest Missouri State Teachers	5–0
Nebraska College Athletic Conference	Doane; Midland Lutheran	3–1
Nebraska Intercollegiate Athletic Association	Nebraska State Teachers; State Normal and Teachers (NE)	2–0–1
North Central Intercollegiate Athletic Conference	South Dakota	5–0
North Dakota College Athletic Conference	North Dakota Science	5–0
Northern Teachers Athletic Conference	Duluth State Teachers; Mankato State Teachers	3–0
Ohio Athletic Conference	John Carroll	4–0–1
Oklahoma Collegiate Athletic Conference	Central State Teachers (OK)	6–0
Pacific Northwest Conference	Pacific (OR); Willamette	4–1
Pennsylvania State Athletic Conference	Mansfield State Teachers	5–0
South Dakota Intercollegiate Conference	Yankton	5–1
Southern California Intercollegiate Athletic Conference	Pomona	4–0–1
Southern Intercollegiate Athletic Conference	Florida A&M College	6–0
Southwestern Athletic Conference	Langston; Southern	2–0–3; 4–1–1
Texas Collegiate Athletic Conference	Howard Payne	6–0–1
Washington Intercollegiate Conference	Western Washington College	2–0
Wisconsin State Teachers College Conference	North: River Falls State Teachers; Co-South: Milwaukee State Teachers; Co-South: Platteville State Teachers	4–0; 3–1; 3–1

=== Minor conference standings ===
1938 Alamo Conference football standings
	Conf.					Overall
Team	W		L		T	W		L		T
Texas A&I $	2	–	0	–	0	6	–	3	–	0
Sul Ross	1	–	1	–	0	4	–	3	–	1
St. Mary's (TX)	0	–	2	–	0	6	–	9	–	0
$ – Conference champion

1938 Buckeye Athletic Association football standings
	Conf.					Overall
Team	W		L		T	W		L		T
Dayton +	3	–	1	–	0	7	–	2	–	0
Ohio +	3	–	1	–	0	7	–	2	–	0
Marshall	2	–	2	–	0	5	–	4	–	0
Miami (OH)	1	–	3	–	0	6	–	3	–	0
Ohio Wesleyan	1	–	3	–	0	1	–	9	–	0
+ – Conference co-champions

1938 Central Intercollegiate Conference football standings
	Conf.					Overall
Team	W		L		T	W		L		T
Wichita $	4	–	0	–	0	7	–	2	–	1
Fort Hays State	3	–	1	–	0	7	–	2	–	0
Pittsburg State	2	–	2	–	0	4	–	4	–	2
Emporia State	1	–	3	–	0	3	–	6	–	0
Southwestern (KS)	0	–	4	–	0	1	–	8	–	0
$ – Conference champion

1938 Colored Intercollegiate Athletic Association football standings
	Conf.					Overall
Team	W		L		T	W		L		T
Virginia State $	6	–	0	–	1	7	–	0	–	1
Morgan	5	–	1	–	1	5	–	1	–	1
Shaw	4	–	1	–	2	4	–	1	–	2
Virginia Union	4	–	2	–	2	5	–	2	–	2
Bluefield State	3	–	3	–	2	4	–	3	–	2
Hampton	3	–	3	–	1	4	–	3	–	1
Johnson C. Smith	2	–	2	–	1	5	–	2	–	1
North Carolina A&T	2	–	4	–	1	3	–	5	–	1
North Carolina College	2	–	4	–	1	2	–	5	–	1
Howard	2	–	4	–	0	4	–	5	–	0
Lincoln (PA)	2	–	5	–	0	3	–	5	–	0
Saint Paul (VA)	2	–	5	–	0	2	–	5	–	0
St. Augustine's	0	–	4	–	0	0	–	4	–	0
$ – Conference champion; Conference standings were based on the Dickinson System.

1938 Dixie Conference football standings
	Conf.					Overall
Team	W		L		T	W		L		T
Southwestern (TN) $	4	–	0	–	0	7	–	1	–	1
Mississippi College	4	–	1	–	0	7	–	2	–	0
Loyola (LA)	2	–	1	–	0	4	–	5	–	0
Howard (AL)	2	–	1	–	0	2	–	5	–	0
Chattanooga	3	–	2	–	0	4	–	5	–	0
Birmingham–Southern	4	–	3	–	0	4	–	5	–	0
Spring Hill	1	–	4	–	0	3	–	6	–	0
Mercer	0	–	3	–	0	3	–	6	–	0
Millsaps	0	–	5	–	0	1	–	10	–	0
$ – Conference champion

1938 Eastern Pennsylvania Collegiate Conference football standings
	Conf.					Overall
Team	W		L		T	W		L		T
Franklin & Marshall +	3	–	1	–	0	6	–	2	–	0
Gettysburg +	3	–	1	–	0	6	–	2	–	0
Muhlenberg +	3	–	1	–	0	7	–	3	–	0
Drexel	1	–	3	–	0	4	–	3	–	1
Ursinus	0	–	4	–	0	0	–	7	–	1
+ – Conference co-champions

1938 Far Western Conference football standings
	Conf.					Overall
Team	W		L		T	W		L		T
Pacific (CA) $	4	–	0	–	0	7	–	3	–	0
Fresno State	2	–	1	–	0	7	–	3	–	0
Nevada	1	–	2	–	0	2	–	3	–	1
Chico State	0	–	2	–	1	2	–	5	–	1
Cal Aggies	0	–	2	–	1	2	–	6	–	1
$ – Conference champion

1938 Illinois College Conference football standings
	Conf.					Overall
Team	W		L		T	W		L		T
Bradley Tech +	4	–	0	–	0	7	–	0	–	1
Lake Forest +	4	–	0	–	0	5	–	2	–	0
Illinois College	2	–	1	–	0	4	–	4	–	0
Wheaton (IL)	2	–	1	–	0	3	–	3	–	0
Illinois Wesleyan	2	–	1	–	0	3	–	4	–	1
Knox (IL)	1	–	2	–	1	3	–	4	–	1
Monmouth (IL)	1	–	2	–	0	5	–	5	–	0
North Central	1	–	3	–	0	3	–	4	–	0
Augustana (IL)	1	–	3	–	0	3	–	4	–	1
Millikin	0	–	5	–	1	2	–	5	–	1
+ – Conference co-champions

1938 Illinois Intercollegiate Athletic Conference football standings
	Conf.					Overall
Team	W		L		T	W		L		T
Northern Illinois State $	4	–	0	–	0	6	–	1	–	1
Carthage	3	–	0	–	0	6	–	1	–	1
Illinois State Normal	4	–	1	–	0	5	–	4	–	1
Western Illinois	2	–	2	–	0	4	–	3	–	1
Eastern Illinois	1	–	3	–	0	5	–	3	–	0
Elmhurst	1	–	3	–	0	2	–	5	–	0
Eureka	0	–	2	–	0	1	–	6	–	0
Southern Illinois	0	–	4	–	0	2	–	7	–	0

1938 Indiana Intercollegiate Conference football standings
	Conf.					Overall
Team	W		L		T	W		L		T
Butler $	3	–	0	–	0	4	–	4	–	0
Manchester	6	–	1	–	0	7	–	1	–	0
Ball State	6	–	1	–	1	6	–	1	–	1
Hanover	4	–	2	–	0	5	–	2	–	0
DePauw	4	–	2	–	0	5	–	3	–	0
Rose Poly	2	–	1	–	0	5	–	3	–	0
Evansville	4	–	3	–	1	4	–	4	–	1
Valparaiso	2	–	2	–	1	2	–	4	–	1
Saint Joseph's (IN)	1	–	2	–	1	2	–	4	–	1
Franklin (IN)	2	–	5	–	0	2	–	6	–	0
Indiana State	1	–	4	–	0	1	–	7	–	0
Earlham	1	–	5	–	1	1	–	6	–	1
Wabash	1	–	5	–	1	1	–	6	–	1
Central Normal	0	–	4	–	0	0	–	7	–	0
$ – Conference champion

1938 Iowa Conference football standings
	Conf.					Overall
Team	W		L		T	W		L		T
Luther $	4	–	0	–	1	5	–	2	–	1
St. Ambrose	3	–	0	–	0	7	–	0	–	1
Upper Iowa	5	–	1	–	1	5	–	1	–	1
Dubuque	4	–	1	–	0	5	–	1	–	2
Penn (IA)	2	–	2	–	1	3	–	3	–	1
Buena Vista	2	–	2	–	0	3	–	4	–	0
Iowa Wesleyan	2	–	2	–	2	2	–	4	–	2
Parsons	2	–	3	–	1	2	–	4	–	2
Western Union	1	–	2	–	0	5	–	3	–	0
Central (IA)	2	–	4	–	0	2	–	6	–	0
Columbia (IA)	2	–	4	–	0	2	–	6	–	0
Simpson (IA)	1	–	4	–	0	1	–	8	–	0
Wartburg	0	–	5	–	0	0	–	6	–	0
$ – Conference champion

1938 Kansas Collegiate Athletic Conference football standings
	Conf.					Overall
Team	W		L		T	W		L		T
Ottawa $	5	–	0	–	0	8	–	0	–	0
Bethany (KS)	3	–	2	–	0	4	–	4	–	0
College of Emporia	3	–	2	–	0	4	–	4	–	1
McPherson	2	–	3	–	0	3	–	5	–	1
Kansas Wesleyan	1	–	4	–	0	2	–	6	–	1
Baker	1	–	4	–	0	2	–	7	–	0
$ – Conference champion

1938 Kentucky Intercollegiate Athletic Conference football standings
	Conf.					Overall
Team	W		L		T	W		L		T
Centre +	2	–	0	–	0	7	–	2	–	0
Western Kentucky State Teachers +	2	–	0	–	0	7	–	2	–	0
Eastern Kentucky	3	–	1	–	1	6	–	1	–	1
Morehead State	2	–	1	–	1	5	–	1	–	1
Murray State	1	–	1	–	0	6	–	2	–	1
Georgetown (KY)	2	–	3	–	0	4	–	4	–	0
Union (KY)	1	–	2	–	0	4	–	4	–	0
Transylvania	2	–	4	–	0	3	–	5	–	0
Louisville	0	–	3	–	0	2	–	6	–	0
+ – Conference co-champions

1938 Lone Star Conference football standings
	Conf.					Overall
Team	W		L		T	W		L		T
East Texas State $	4	–	0	–	0	8	–	1	–	0
Sam Houston State	3	–	1	–	0	8	–	2	–	0
North Texas State	2	–	2	–	0	7	–	4	–	0
Stephen F. Austin	1	–	3	–	0	3	–	5	–	1
Southwest Texas State	0	–	4	–	0	0	–	8	–	0
$ – Conference champion

1938 Michigan Intercollegiate Athletic Association football standings
	Conf.					Overall
Team	W		L		T	W		L		T
Hillsdale $	4	–	0	–	0	8	–	0	–	0
Albion	2	–	1	–	1	5	–	2	–	1
Kalamazoo	1	–	2	–	1	3	–	4	–	1
Alma	1	–	2	–	1	3	–	5	–	1
Hope	0	–	3	–	1	4	–	3	–	1
$ – Conference champion

1938 Michigan-Ontario Collegiate Conference football standings
	Conf.					Overall
Team	W		L		T	W		L		T
Lawrence Tech $	3	–	0	–	0	3	–	4	–	0
St. Mary's (MI)	1	–	1	–	1	1	–	4	–	2
Ferris Institute	0	–	1	–	2	0	–	5	–	2
Assumption (ON)	0	–	2	–	1	?	–	?	–	?
$ – Conference champion

1938 Middle Three Conference football standings
	Conf.					Overall
Team	W		L		T	W		L		T
Rutgers $	2	–	0	–	0	7	–	1	–	0
Lafayette	1	–	1	–	0	5	–	3	–	0
Lehigh	0	–	2	–	0	2	–	5	–	2
$ – Conference champion

1938 Midwest Athletic Association football standings
	Conf.					Overall
Team	W		L		T	W		L		T
Kentucky State $	4	–	0	–	0	7	–	2	–	0
Tennessee State	2	–	1	–	0	6	–	1	–	0
Wilberforce	2	–	2	–	1	4	–	2	–	1
West Virginia State	2	–	2	–	1	3	–	4	–	1
Lincoln (MO)	2	–	3	–	0	3	–	3	–	1
Louisville Municipal	0	–	4	–	0	0	–	6	–	0
$ – Conference champion

1938 Midwest Conference football standings
	Conf.					Overall
Team	W		L		T	W		L		T
Lawrence $	5	–	0	–	0	6	–	1	–	0
Coe	3	–	2	–	0	4	–	4	–	0
Knox	3	–	2	–	0	3	–	4	–	1
Beloit	2	–	2	–	1	3	–	3	–	1
Monmouth (IL)	2	–	3	–	0	5	–	5	–	0
Ripon	2	–	3	–	0	2	–	5	–	0
Cornell (IA)	1	–	3	–	1	3	–	5	–	1
Carleton	1	–	4	–	0	1	–	6	–	0
$ – Conference champion

1938 Minnesota Intercollegiate Athletic Conference football standings
	Conf.					Overall
Team	W		L		T	W		L		T
Saint John's (MN) $	5	–	0	–	0	6	–	2	–	0
Gustavus Adolphus	4	–	1	–	0	5	–	1	–	0
St. Thomas (MN)	4	–	1	–	0	6	–	2	–	0
St. Olaf	3	–	2	–	0	5	–	2	–	0
Hamline	2	–	3	–	0	2	–	4	–	0
Macalester	2	–	3	–	0	4	–	3	–	0
Concordia (MN)	0	–	5	–	0	2	–	6	–	1
Saint Mary's (MN)	0	–	5	–	0	0	–	7	–	0
$ – Conference champion

1938 Missouri College Athletic Union football standings
	Conf.					Overall
Team	W		L		T	W		L		T
William Jewell $	4	–	0	–	0	5	–	2	–	0
Central (MO)	1	–	1	–	2	2	–	4	–	2
Missouri Valley	1	–	2	–	1	5	–	3	–	1
Culver–Stockton	1	–	2	–	0	2	–	6	–	0
Tarkio	0	–	2	–	1	4	–	3	–	1
$ – Conference champion

1938 Missouri Intercollegiate Athletic Association football standings
	Conf.					Overall
Team	W		L		T	W		L		T
Maryville (MO) $	5	–	0	–	0	9	–	0	–	0
Rolla	3	–	2	–	0	4	–	4	–	0
Springfield (MO)	2	–	2	–	1	5	–	2	–	2
Kirksville	2	–	3	–	0	3	–	5	–	0
Warrensburg	1	–	3	–	1	2	–	5	–	1
Cape Girardeau	1	–	4	–	0	3	–	5	–	0
$ – Conference champion

1938 Missouri Valley Conference football standings
	Conf.					Overall
Team	W		L		T	W		L		T
Washburn *	2	–	0	–	0	6	–	3	–	0
Creighton *	1	–	0	–	1	6	–	1	–	1
Tulsa $	3	–	1	–	0	4	–	5	–	1
Washington University	2	–	1	–	1	6	–	3	–	1
Drake	2	–	1	–	1	5	–	4	–	1
Saint Louis	1	–	1	–	1	3	–	5	–	2
Grinnell	0	–	3	–	0	3	–	5	–	0
Oklahoma A&M	0	–	4	–	0	2	–	8	–	0
$ – Conference champion; * ineligible for championship because of insufficient games

1938 Nebraska College Athletic Conference football standings
	Conf.					Overall
Team	W		L		T	W		L		T
Midland +	3	–	1	–	0	6	–	3	–	0
Doane +	3	–	1	–	0	5	–	3	–	0
Hastings	2	–	1	–	1	5	–	3	–	2
Nebraska Wesleyan	1	–	2	–	1	4	–	4	–	1
York (NE)	0	–	4	–	0	2	–	6	–	0
+ – Conference co-champions

1938 Nebraska Intercollegiate Athletic Association football standings
	Conf.					Overall
Team	W		L		T	W		L		T
Kearney State +	2	–	0	–	1	4	–	4	–	1
Wayne State (NE) +	2	–	0	–	1	3	–	5	–	1
Chadron State	0	–	2	–	0	2	–	6	–	0
Peru State	0	–	2	–	0	1	–	7	–	0
+ – Conference co-champions

1938 New England Conference football standings
	Conf.					Overall
Team	W		L		T	W		L		T
Rhode Island State $	2	–	0	–	0	4	–	4	–	0
Maine	2	–	1	–	0	3	–	4	–	0
New Hampshire	1	–	1	–	0	3	–	6	–	0
Northeastern	0	–	0	–	0	3	–	3	–	1
Connecticut State	0	–	3	–	0	4	–	3	–	0
$ – Conference champion

1938 North Central Conference football standings
	Conf.					Overall
Team	W		L		T	W		L		T
South Dakota $	5	–	0	–	0	7	–	1	–	0
North Dakota	3	–	1	–	0	6	–	2	–	0
North Dakota Agricultural	3	–	1	–	0	5	–	4	–	0
South Dakota State	2	–	3	–	0	3	–	5	–	0
Morningside	1	–	3	–	1	4	–	3	–	1
Omaha	1	–	3	–	1	2	–	5	–	1
Iowa State Teachers	0	–	4	–	0	3	–	5	–	0
$ – Conference champion

1938 North Dakota Intercollegiate Conference football standings
	Conf.					Overall
Team	W		L		T	W		L		T
Wahpeton $	5	–	0	–	0	7	–	0	–	0
Valley City State	5	–	1	–	0	5	–	2	–	0
Ellendale	3	–	2	–	1	3	–	2	–	2
Jamestown	2	–	2	–	1	2	–	5	–	1
Dickinson State	1	–	2	–	1	1	–	3	–	2
Minot State	1	–	2	–	2	1	–	3	–	2
Mayville State	0	–	4	–	1	0	–	5	–	1
Bottineau	0	–	4	–	0	0	–	4	–	0
$ – Conference champion

1938 North State Conference football standings
	Conf.					Overall
Team	W		L		T	W		L		T
Catawba +	4	–	1	–	0	7	–	2	–	1
Elon +	4	–	1	–	0	6	–	3	–	0
Appalachian State	3	–	1	–	0	9	–	1	–	0
Lenoir Rhyne	4	–	2	–	0	4	–	3	–	2
Guilford	0	–	3	–	1	1	–	5	–	2
High Point	0	–	4	–	1	2	–	4	–	1
Western Carolina	0	–	3	–	0	0	–	7	–	1
+ – Conference co-champions

1938 Northern Teachers College Conference football standings
	Conf.					Overall
Team	W		L		T	W		L		T
Duluth State +	3	–	0	–	0	7	–	0	–	1
Mankato State +	3	–	0	–	0	5	–	2	–	1
Winona State	3	–	1	–	0	5	–	2	–	0
St. Cloud State	2	–	3	–	0	2	–	4	–	1
Moorhead State	0	–	3	–	0	0	–	6	–	1
Bemidji State	0	–	4	–	0	1	–	5	–	0
+ – Conference co-champions

1938 Northwest Conference football standings
	Conf.					Overall
Team	W		L		T	W		L		T
Willamette +	4	–	1	–	0	5	–	3	–	0
Pacific (OR) +	4	–	1	–	0	4	–	3	–	0
College of Idaho	2	–	2	–	1	4	–	4	–	1
Whitman	1	–	3	–	1	2	–	4	–	1
Puget Sound	1	–	3	–	0	2	–	5	–	0
Linfield	1	–	3	–	0	2	–	6	–	0
+ – Conference co-champions

1938 Ohio Athletic Conference football standings
	Conf.					Overall
Team	W		L		T	W		L		T
Wooster $	5	–	0	–	2	5	–	0	–	3
John Carroll	4	–	0	–	2	6	–	2	–	1
Ohio Northern	6	–	1	–	1	6	–	1	–	1
Capital	5	–	1	–	1	6	–	1	–	1
Denison	5	–	2	–	0	7	–	2	–	0
Mount Union	4	–	2	–	0	5	–	3	–	0
Muskingum	4	–	2	–	1	5	–	3	–	1
Wittenberg	4	–	2	–	0	4	–	4	–	0
Baldwin–Wallace	2	–	1	–	0	3	–	5	–	0
Kent State	3	–	2	–	0	6	–	2	–	0
Toledo	0	–	0	–	1	6	–	3	–	1
Bowling Green	2	–	2	–	2	3	–	2	–	3
Case	2	–	2	–	1	2	–	4	–	2
Oberlin	1	–	4	–	0	3	–	4	–	1
Findlay	1	–	4	–	0	3	–	5	–	0
Kenyon	1	–	4	–	0	1	–	5	–	0
Marietta	1	–	4	–	0	1	–	6	–	0
Otterbein	1	–	5	–	0	2	–	6	–	0
Heidelberg	1	–	7	–	0	1	–	8	–	0
Ashland	0	–	7	–	0	0	–	7	–	0
$ – Conference champion

1938 Oklahoma Collegiate Conference football standings
	Conf.					Overall
Team	W		L		T	W		L		T
Central State Teachers $	6	–	0	–	0	6	–	3	–	0
Oklahoma Baptist	5	–	1	–	0	7	–	3	–	0
SE Oklahoma State	4	–	2	–	0	7	–	3	–	0
NW Oklahoma State	3	–	3	–	0	3	–	5	–	1
SW Oklahoma State	2	–	4	–	0	3	–	5	–	1
East Central	1	–	5	–	0	2	–	6	–	1
Northeastern State	0	–	6	–	0	0	–	6	–	3
$ – Conference champion

1938 Pennsylvania State Teachers Conference football standings
	Conf.					Overall
Team	W		L		T	W		L		T
Mansfield $	5	–	0	–	0	7	–	0	–	0
Slippery Rock	3	–	0	–	1	6	–	2	–	1
West Chester	1	–	0	–	2	4	–	2	–	3
Shippensburg	5	–	1	–	1	6	–	1	–	1
Lock Haven	3	–	1	–	1	4	–	3	–	1
Kutztown	2	–	1	–	2	4	–	1	–	2
Indiana (PA)	3	–	4	–	0	3	–	4	–	0
Clarion	1	–	2	–	0	5	–	3	–	0
California (PA)	1	–	2	–	0	2	–	3	–	2
Edinboro	1	–	3	–	0	1	–	4	–	0
East Stroudsburg	1	–	3	–	0	2	–	6	–	0
Millersville	0	–	3	–	2	2	–	4	–	2
Bloomsburg	0	–	6	–	1	1	–	6	–	1
$ – Conference champion

1938 Rocky Mountain Conference football standings
	Conf.					Overall
Team	W		L		T	W		L		T
Montana State $	1	–	0	–	1	3	–	5	–	1
Colorado Mines	2	–	1	–	0	4	–	3	–	0
Colorado State–Greeley	1	–	1	–	1	3	–	4	–	1
Colorado College	1	–	1	–	0	1	–	6	–	0
Western State (CO)	1	–	3	–	0	3	–	5	–	0
$ – Conference champion

1938 Smoky Mountain Conference football standings
	Conf.					Overall
Team	W		L		T	W		L		T
East Tennessee State Teachers $	5	–	1	–	0	6	–	2	–	0
Appalachian State	3	–	0	–	0	9	–	1	–	0
King	3	–	1	–	1	5	–	1	–	3
Carson–Newman	3	–	3	–	1	5	–	4	–	1
Maryville (TN)	3	–	3	–	0	4	–	5	–	1
Milligan	1	–	2	–	2	5	–	3	–	2
Cumberland (TN)	1	–	4	–	0	2	–	8	–	0
Tusculum	0	–	5	–	0	0	–	8	–	1
$ – Conference champion

1938 South Dakota Intercollegiate Conference football standings
	Conf.					Overall
Team	W		L		T	W		L		T
South Dakota Mines $	5	–	0	–	0	8	–	0	–	0
Dakota Wesleyan	4	–	1	–	0	5	–	3	–	0
Yankton	4	–	2	–	0	5	–	3	–	0
Southern Normal	3	–	2	–	0	4	–	2	–	0
Augustana (SD)	2	–	2	–	1	5	–	2	–	1
Huron	3	–	3	–	0	5	–	3	–	0
Northern Normal	2	–	3	–	1	2	–	4	–	2
Sioux Falls	1	–	4	–	0	1	–	7	–	0
Eastern Normal	0	–	3	–	0	1	–	6	–	0
Spearfish	0	–	4	–	0	3	–	4	–	0
$ – Conference champion; Yankton initially won the conference title with a 5–1 mark, but later forfeited and their win over South Dakota Mines and the title because of an ineligible player.

1938 Southern California Conference football standings
	Conf.					Overall
Team	W		L		T	W		L		T
Pomona $	4	–	0	–	1	6	–	0	–	1
Whittier	2	–	0	–	2	7	–	1	–	2
San Diego State	2	–	1	–	1	5	–	2	–	1
Redlands	2	–	3	–	0	3	–	5	–	0
Occidental	1	–	4	–	0	3	–	5	–	0
Caltech	0	–	3	–	0	1	–	7	–	0
$ – Conference champion

1938 Southern Intercollegiate Athletic Association football standings
	Conf.					Overall
Team	W		L		T	W		L		T
West Tennessee State Teachers $	7	–	0	–	0	10	–	0	–	0
Centre	4	–	0	–	0	7	–	2	–	0
Miami (FL)	3	–	0	–	0	8	–	2	–	0
Centenary	2	–	0	–	0	7	–	4	–	0
Mississippi State Teachers	6	–	1	–	0	7	–	2	–	0
Presbyterian	6	–	1	–	0	6	–	4	–	0
Mississippi College	5	–	1	–	0	7	–	2	–	0
Western Kentucky State Teachers	4	–	1	–	0	7	–	2	–	0
SW Louisiana	4	–	1	–	1	8	–	2	–	1
Murray State	4	–	1	–	0	6	–	2	–	1
Tennessee Tech	4	–	1	–	0	6	–	3	–	0
Eastern Kentucky	3	–	1	–	1	6	–	1	–	1
Morehead State	2	–	1	–	1	5	–	1	–	1
Stetson	4	–	2	–	1	6	–	2	–	1
Newberry	4	–	2	–	0	5	–	5	–	0
Rollins	3	–	2	–	1	6	–	2	–	1
Louisiana Normal	3	–	3	–	0	5	–	5	–	0
Georgetown (KY)	2	–	3	–	0	4	–	4	–	0
Union (TN)	2	–	3	–	0	4	–	6	–	0
Louisiana College	2	–	4	–	1	4	–	4	–	1
Union (KY)	1	–	2	–	0	4	–	4	–	0
Transylvania	2	–	4	–	0	3	–	5	–	0
Louisiana Tech	2	–	4	–	0	3	–	7	–	1
Delta State	2	–	5	–	0	2	–	7	–	0
Oglethorpe	2	–	5	–	0	2	–	9	–	0
Middle Tennessee State Teachers	1	–	5	–	0	2	–	6	–	0
Howard (AL)	0	–	2	–	0	2	–	5	–	0
Emory and Henry	0	–	2	–	0	1	–	6	–	2
Louisville	0	–	3	–	0	2	–	6	–	0
Troy State	0	–	3	–	1	3	–	4	–	1
Jacksonville State	0	–	3	–	1	1	–	6	–	1
Erskine	0	–	3	–	1	1	–	7	–	2
Tampa	0	–	4	–	0	3	–	7	–	0
Wofford	0	–	4	–	1	0	–	8	–	1
Millsaps	0	–	7	–	0	1	–	10	–	0
$ – Conference champion

1938 Southern Intercollegiate Athletic Conference football standings
	Conf.					Overall
Team	W		L		T	W		L		T
Florida A&M $	6	–	0	–	0	8	–	0	–	0
Morris Brown	6	–	1	–	1	6	–	2	–	1
Morehouse	4	–	1	–	1	4	–	3	–	1
LeMoyne	4	–	1	–	0	5	–	2	–	0
Xavier (LA)	3	–	1	–	1	4	–	3	–	3
Alabama State	4	–	4	–	1	4	–	4	–	1
Lane	3	–	2	–	0	4	–	3	–	0
South Carolina State	2	–	3	–	0	3	–	5	–	0
Fisk	2	–	3	–	1	2	–	3	–	2
Tuskegee	1	–	4	–	2	1	–	7	–	2
Clark (GA)	0	–	6	–	1	0	–	6	–	1
Knoxville	0	–	7	–	1	0	–	8	–	1
Talladega	0	–	2	–	1	0	–	5	–	1
$ – Conference champion; Standings were based on Dickinson System ratings.

1938 Southwestern Athletic Conference football standings
	Conf.					Overall
Team	W		L		T	W		L		T
Southern +	4	–	1	–	1	7	–	1	–	1
Langston +	3	–	0	–	3	4	–	1	–	3
Prairie View	2	–	2	–	2	4	–	2	–	3
Wiley	2	–	3	–	1	5	–	3	–	2
Texas College	2	–	3	–	1	5	–	3	–	1
Arkansas AM&N	2	–	3	–	1	4	–	4	–	1
Bishop	1	–	4	–	1	4	–	5	–	1
+ – Conference co-champions

1938 Texas Conference football standings
	Conf.					Overall
Team	W		L		T	W		L		T
Howard Payne $	6	–	0	–	1	7	–	3	–	1
St. Edward's	4	–	2	–	0	7	–	3	–	0
Southwestern (TX)	4	–	2	–	0	6	–	4	–	0
Trinity (TX)	4	–	2	–	0	4	–	6	–	0
Abilene Christian	3	–	2	–	1	6	–	2	–	1
Texas Wesleyan	2	–	3	–	0	3	–	4	–	1
Austin	2	–	5	–	0	2	–	8	–	0
Daniel Baker	1	–	5	–	0	1	–	9	–	0
McMurry	1	–	6	–	0	1	–	8	–	0
$ – Conference champion

1938 Washington Intercollegiate Conference football standings
	Conf.					Overall
Team	W		L		T	W		L		T
Western Washington $	3	–	0	–	0	7	–	0	–	0
Eastern Washington	2	–	1	–	0	6	–	2	–	1
Central Washington	1	–	2	–	0	3	–	3	–	1
Pacific Lutheran	0	–	3	–	0	2	–	5	–	1
$ – Conference champion

1938 West Virginia Intercollegiate Athletic Conference football standings
	Conf.					Overall
Team	W		L		T	W		L		T
Morris Harvey $	7	–	0	–	1	7	–	1	–	1
Concord	4	–	0	–	1	5	–	2	–	1
Glenville State	4	–	2	–	1	4	–	3	–	1
West Liberty State	3	–	2	–	0	4	–	5	–	0
Salem	2	–	4	–	1	2	–	5	–	1
Potomac State	1	–	3	–	1	2	–	4	–	1
New River State	1	–	3	–	0	5	–	2	–	0
Fairmont State	1	–	4	–	1	1	–	4	–	2
Bethany (WV)	0	–	4	–	0	2	–	6	–	0
West Virginia Wesleyan *	2	–	1	–	0	3	–	5	–	0
Davis & Elkins *	1	–	1	–	1	2	–	7	–	1
Shepherd *	0	–	2	–	1	1	–	4	–	2
$ – Conference champion; * – Did not qualify for conference standings Ties did not count in conference standings.

1938 Wisconsin State Teachers College Conference football standings
	Conf.					Overall
Team	W		L		T	W		L		T
Northern Division
River Falls State x	4	–	0	–	0	6	–	1	–	0
La Crosse State	3	–	1	–	0	4	–	3	–	0
Superior State	2	–	2	–	0	2	–	6	–	0
Eau Claire State	1	–	3	–	0	2	–	5	–	0
Stout Institute	0	–	4	–	0	0	–	5	–	2
Southern Division
Platteville State x	3	–	1	–	0	4	–	1	–	0
Milwaukee State x	3	–	1	–	0	4	–	3	–	0
Whitewater State	2	–	2	–	0	5	–	2	–	0
Stevens Point State	2	–	2	–	0	3	–	2	–	2
Oshkosh State	0	–	4	–	0	1	–	6	–	0
x – Division champion/co-champions

== Heisman Trophy voting ==
The Heisman Trophy is given to the year's most outstanding player

Player	School	Position	Total
Davey O'Brien	TCU	QB	519
Marshall Goldberg	Pittsburgh	HB	294
Sid Luckman	Columbia	QB	154
Bob MacLeod	Dartmouth	HB	78
Vic Bottari	California	HB	67
Howard Weiss	Wisconsin	FB	60
George Cafego	Tennessee	HB	55
Ki Aldrich	TCU	C	48
Whitey Beinor	Notre Dame	OL	47
Dan Hill	Duke	C	38

== Bowl games ==
Bowl game	Winning team		Losing team	
Cotton Bowl Classic	Saint Mary's	20	No. 11 Texas Tech	13
Orange Bowl	No. 2 Tennessee	17	No. 4 Oklahoma	0
Rose Bowl	No. 7 USC	7	No. 3 Duke	3
Sugar Bowl	No. 1 TCU	15	No. 6 Carnegie Tech	7
Sun Bowl	Utah	26	New Mexico	0

== See also ==
- 1938 College Football All-America Team
