= 1938 Fordham Rams football team =

American college football season

1938 Fordham Rams football
- Conference: Independent

Ranking
- AP: No. 15
- Record: 6–1–2
- Head coach: Jim Crowley (6th season)
- Home stadium: Polo Grounds

1938 Eastern college football independents records
	Conf.			Overall
Team	W	L	T	W		L		T
Worcester Tech		–		6	–	0	–	0
No. 18 Villanova		–		8	–	0	–	1
No. 9 Holy Cross		–		8	–	1	–	0
Boston College		–		6	–	1	–	2
No. 15 Fordham		–		6	–	1	–	2
No. 12 Cornell		–		5	–	1	–	1
Army		–		8	–	2	–	0
No. 8 Pittsburgh		–		8	–	2	–	0
No. 6 Carnegie Tech		–		7	–	2	–	0
No. 20 Dartmouth		–		7	–	2	–	0
Vermont		–		4	–	2	–	1
Brown		–		5	–	3	–	0
Bucknell		–		5	–	3	–	0
Syracuse		–		5	–	3	–	0
CCNY		–		4	–	3	–	0
Penn		–		3	–	2	–	3
Manhattan		–		5	–	4	–	0
Harvard		–		4	–	4	–	0
La Salle		–		4	–	4	–	0
NYU		–		4	–	4	–	0
Boston University		–		3	–	4	–	1
Penn State		–		3	–	4	–	1
Princeton		–		3	–	4	–	1
Hofstra		–		2	–	3	–	1
Duquesne		–		4	–	6	–	0
Temple		–		3	–	6	–	1
Providence		–		3	–	5	–	0
Columbia		–		3	–	6	–	0
Massachusetts State		–		3	–	6	–	0
Colgate		–		2	–	5	–	0
Buffalo		–		2	–	6	–	0
Yale		–		2	–	6	–	0
Tufts		–		1	–	6	–	1
Rankings from AP Poll

The 1938 Fordham Rams football team represented Fordham University as an intendent during the 1938 college football season. Led by sixth-year head coach Jim Crowley, the Rams compiled a record of 6–1–2 and were ranked 15th in the final AP poll.

== Schedule ==
Date	Opponent	Rank	Site	Result	Attendance	Source
October 1	Upsala		Randall's Island Stadium; New York, NY	W 47–0	7,500	
October 8	Waynesburg		Randall's Island Stadium; New York, NY	W 53–0	8,000	
October 15	Purdue		Polo Grounds; New York, NY	T 6–6	32,000	
October 22	Oregon	No. 11	Polo Grounds; New York, NY	W 26–0	26,866	
October 29	at No. 1 Pittsburgh	No. 9	Pitt Stadium; Pittsburgh, PA	L 13–24	75,867	
November 5	Saint Mary's	No. 10	Polo Grounds; New York, NY	W 3–0	44,274	
November 12	North Carolina	No. 13	Polo Grounds; New York, NY	T 0–0	21,416	
November 19	South Carolina	No. 18	Polo Grounds; New York, NY	W 13–0	15,000	
November 26	vs. NYU	No. 18	Yankee Stadium; Bronx, NY	W 25–0	50,000	
Rankings from AP Poll released prior to the game
