= 1938 Holy Cross Crusaders football team =

American college football season

1938 Holy Cross Crusaders football
- Conference: Independent

Ranking
- AP: No. 9
- Record: 8–1
- Head coach: Eddie Anderson (6th season)
- Home stadium: Fitton Field

1938 Eastern college football independents records
| | Conf. | | | Overall |
| Team | W | L | T | W | | L | | T |
|---|---|---|---|---|---|---|---|---|
| Worcester Tech | | – | | 6 | – | 0 | – | 0 |
| No. 18 Villanova | | – | | 8 | – | 0 | – | 1 |
| No. 9 Holy Cross | | – | | 8 | – | 1 | – | 0 |
| Boston College | | – | | 6 | – | 1 | – | 2 |
| No. 15 Fordham | | – | | 6 | – | 1 | – | 2 |
| No. 12 Cornell | | – | | 5 | – | 1 | – | 1 |
| Army | | – | | 8 | – | 2 | – | 0 |
| No. 8 Pittsburgh | | – | | 8 | – | 2 | – | 0 |
| No. 6 Carnegie Tech | | – | | 7 | – | 2 | – | 0 |
| No. 20 Dartmouth | | – | | 7 | – | 2 | – | 0 |
| Vermont | | – | | 4 | – | 2 | – | 1 |
| Brown | | – | | 5 | – | 3 | – | 0 |
| Bucknell | | – | | 5 | – | 3 | – | 0 |
| Syracuse | | – | | 5 | – | 3 | – | 0 |
| CCNY | | – | | 4 | – | 3 | – | 0 |
| Penn | | – | | 3 | – | 2 | – | 3 |
| Manhattan | | – | | 5 | – | 4 | – | 0 |
| Harvard | | – | | 4 | – | 4 | – | 0 |
| La Salle | | – | | 4 | – | 4 | – | 0 |
| NYU | | – | | 4 | – | 4 | – | 0 |
| Boston University | | – | | 3 | – | 4 | – | 1 |
| Penn State | | – | | 3 | – | 4 | – | 1 |
| Princeton | | – | | 3 | – | 4 | – | 1 |
| Hofstra | | – | | 2 | – | 3 | – | 1 |
| Duquesne | | – | | 4 | – | 6 | – | 0 |
| Temple | | – | | 3 | – | 6 | – | 1 |
| Providence | | – | | 3 | – | 5 | – | 0 |
| Columbia | | – | | 3 | – | 6 | – | 0 |
| Massachusetts State | | – | | 3 | – | 6 | – | 0 |
| Colgate | | – | | 2 | – | 5 | – | 0 |
| Buffalo | | – | | 2 | – | 6 | – | 0 |
| Yale | | – | | 2 | – | 6 | – | 0 |
| Tufts | | – | | 1 | – | 6 | – | 1 |
Rankings from AP Poll

The 1938 Holy Cross Crusaders football team represented the College of the Holy Cross as an independent during the 1938 college football season. The Crusaders were led by sixth-year head coach Eddie Anderson and played their home games at Fitton Field in Worcester, Massachusetts. Holy Cross's sole loss on the year came on a road trip to Carnegie Tech, where a missed extra point by the Crusaders prevented the tie. They finished ninth in the final AP poll, the best finish in the Crusaders' history.

== Schedule ==
| Date | Time | Opponent | Rank | Site | Result | Attendance | Source |
|---|---|---|---|---|---|---|---|
| September 24 | | Providence | | Fitton Field; Worcester, MA | W 28–0 | 12,000 | |
| October 1 | | Rhode Island | | Fitton Field; Worcester, MA | W 46–13 | | |
| October 8 | | Manhattan | | Fitton Field; Worcester, MA | W 19–6 | | |
| October 15 | | at Carnegie Tech | | Pitt Stadium; Pittsburgh, PA | L 6–7 | | |
| October 22 | 2:00 p.m. | Georgia | No. 14 | Fitton Field; Worcester, MA | W 29–6 | 24,000–25,000 | |
| October 29 | | Colgate | No. 14 | Fitton Field; Worcester, MA | W 21–0 | | |
| November 5 | | Temple | No. 13 | Fitton Field; Worcester, MA | W 33–0 | | |
| November 12 | | Brown | No. 11 | Fitton Field; Worcester, MA | W 14–12 | | |
| November 26 | | vs. Boston College | No. 11 | Fenway Park; Boston, MA (rivalry) | W 29–7 | 36,000 | |
Rankings from AP Poll released prior to the game; All times are in Eastern time; Source:
