= 1938 Villanova Wildcats football team =

American college football season

1938 Villanova Wildcats football
- Conference: Independent

Ranking
- AP: No. 18
- Record: 8–0–1
- Head coach: Clipper Smith (3rd season)
- Home stadium: Shibe Park, Villanova Stadium

1938 Eastern college football independents records
	Conf.			Overall
Team	W	L	T	W		L		T
Worcester Tech		–		6	–	0	–	0
No. 18 Villanova		–		8	–	0	–	1
No. 9 Holy Cross		–		8	–	1	–	0
Boston College		–		6	–	1	–	2
No. 15 Fordham		–		6	–	1	–	2
No. 12 Cornell		–		5	–	1	–	1
Army		–		8	–	2	–	0
No. 8 Pittsburgh		–		8	–	2	–	0
No. 6 Carnegie Tech		–		7	–	2	–	0
No. 20 Dartmouth		–		7	–	2	–	0
Vermont		–		4	–	2	–	1
Brown		–		5	–	3	–	0
Bucknell		–		5	–	3	–	0
Syracuse		–		5	–	3	–	0
CCNY		–		4	–	3	–	0
Penn		–		3	–	2	–	3
Manhattan		–		5	–	4	–	0
Harvard		–		4	–	4	–	0
La Salle		–		4	–	4	–	0
NYU		–		4	–	4	–	0
Boston University		–		3	–	4	–	1
Penn State		–		3	–	4	–	1
Princeton		–		3	–	4	–	1
Hofstra		–		2	–	3	–	1
Duquesne		–		4	–	6	–	0
Temple		–		3	–	6	–	1
Providence		–		3	–	5	–	0
Columbia		–		3	–	6	–	0
Massachusetts State		–		3	–	6	–	0
Colgate		–		2	–	5	–	0
Buffalo		–		2	–	6	–	0
Yale		–		2	–	6	–	0
Tufts		–		1	–	6	–	1
Rankings from AP Poll

The 1938 Villanova Wildcats football team represented Villanova College as an independent during the 1938 college football season. The Wildcats were led by third-year head coach Clipper Smith and played their home games at Villanova Stadium in Villanova, Pennsylvania. For the second year in a row, Villanova ended the season undefeated with a record of 8–0–1, and were ranked 18th in the final AP poll.

== Schedule ==
Date	Opponent	Rank	Site	Result	Attendance	Source
October 1	American International		Villanova Stadium; Villanova, PA	W 59–0		
October 8	at Muhlenberg		Jack Coffield Stadium; Allentown, PA	W 25–7		
October 15	Centre		Shibe Park; Philadelphia, PA	W 35–6		
October 23	Detroit	No. 20	Shibe Park; Philadelphia, PA	W 13–6	25,000	
October 28	at South Carolina	No. 15	Orangeburg County fairgrounds; Orangeburg, SC	T 6–6		
November 5	Auburn		Shibe Park; Philadelphia, PA	W 25–12	17,000	
November 12	at Temple	No. 19	Temple Stadium; Philadelphia, PA	W 20–7		
November 19	at Boston University	No. 15	Fenway Park; Boston, MA	W 39–6		
November 24	at Manhattan	No. 16	Polo Grounds; New York, NY	W 20–0		
Rankings from AP Poll released prior to the game; Source:
