= 1938 Dartmouth Indians football team =

American college football season

1938 Dartmouth Indians football
- Conference: Independent

Ranking
- AP: No. 20
- Record: 7–2
- Head coach: Earl Blaik (5th season)
- Captain: Bob MacLeod
- Home stadium: Memorial Field

1938 Eastern college football independents records
| | Conf. | | | Overall |
| Team | W | L | T | W | | L | | T |
|---|---|---|---|---|---|---|---|---|
| Worcester Tech | | – | | 6 | – | 0 | – | 0 |
| No. 18 Villanova | | – | | 8 | – | 0 | – | 1 |
| No. 9 Holy Cross | | – | | 8 | – | 1 | – | 0 |
| Boston College | | – | | 6 | – | 1 | – | 2 |
| No. 15 Fordham | | – | | 6 | – | 1 | – | 2 |
| No. 12 Cornell | | – | | 5 | – | 1 | – | 1 |
| Army | | – | | 8 | – | 2 | – | 0 |
| No. 8 Pittsburgh | | – | | 8 | – | 2 | – | 0 |
| No. 6 Carnegie Tech | | – | | 7 | – | 2 | – | 0 |
| No. 20 Dartmouth | | – | | 7 | – | 2 | – | 0 |
| Vermont | | – | | 4 | – | 2 | – | 1 |
| Brown | | – | | 5 | – | 3 | – | 0 |
| Bucknell | | – | | 5 | – | 3 | – | 0 |
| Syracuse | | – | | 5 | – | 3 | – | 0 |
| CCNY | | – | | 4 | – | 3 | – | 0 |
| Penn | | – | | 3 | – | 2 | – | 3 |
| Manhattan | | – | | 5 | – | 4 | – | 0 |
| Harvard | | – | | 4 | – | 4 | – | 0 |
| La Salle | | – | | 4 | – | 4 | – | 0 |
| NYU | | – | | 4 | – | 4 | – | 0 |
| Boston University | | – | | 3 | – | 4 | – | 1 |
| Penn State | | – | | 3 | – | 4 | – | 1 |
| Princeton | | – | | 3 | – | 4 | – | 1 |
| Hofstra | | – | | 2 | – | 3 | – | 1 |
| Duquesne | | – | | 4 | – | 6 | – | 0 |
| Temple | | – | | 3 | – | 6 | – | 1 |
| Providence | | – | | 3 | – | 5 | – | 0 |
| Columbia | | – | | 3 | – | 6 | – | 0 |
| Massachusetts State | | – | | 3 | – | 6 | – | 0 |
| Colgate | | – | | 2 | – | 5 | – | 0 |
| Buffalo | | – | | 2 | – | 6 | – | 0 |
| Yale | | – | | 2 | – | 6 | – | 0 |
| Tufts | | – | | 1 | – | 6 | – | 1 |
Rankings from AP Poll

The 1938 Dartmouth Indians football team represented Dartmouth College in the 1938 college football season. The Indians were led by fifth-year head coach Earl Blaik and played their home games at Memorial Field in Hanover, New Hampshire. The Indians finished with a record of 7–2, finishing No. 20 in the final AP Poll. Their loss on the road to rival Cornell snapped a 22-game unbeaten streak.

== Schedule ==
| Date | Opponent | Rank | Site | Result | Source |
|---|---|---|---|---|---|
| September 24 | Bates | | Memorial Field; Hanover, NH | W 46–0 | |
| October 1 | St. Lawrence | | Memorial Field; Hanover, NH | W 51–0 | |
| October 8 | at Princeton | | Palmer Stadium; Princeton, NJ | W 22–0 | |
| October 15 | Brown | | Memorial Field; Hanover, NH | W 34–13 | |
| October 22 | at Harvard | No. 4 | Harvard Stadium; Boston, MA (rivalry) | W 13–7 | |
| October 29 | at Yale | No. 6 | Yale Bowl; New Haven, CT | W 24–6 | |
| November 5 | Dickinson | No. 5 | Memorial Field; Hanover, NH | W 44–6 | |
| November 12 | at No. 20 Cornell | No. 5 | Schoellkopf Field; Ithaca, NY (rivalry) | L 7–14 | |
| November 26 | at Stanford | No. 13 | Stanford Stadium; Stanford, CA | L 13–23 | |
Rankings from AP Poll released prior to the game; Source:
