= 1938 Carnegie Tech Tartans football team =

American college football season

1938 Carnegie Tech Tartans football

Lambert-Meadowlands Trophy

Sugar Bowl, L 7–15 vs. TCU
- Conference: Independent

Ranking
- AP: No. 6
- Record: 7–2
- Head coach: Bill Kern (2nd season)
- Home stadium: Pitt Stadium

1938 Eastern college football independents records
	Conf.			Overall
Team	W	L	T	W		L		T
Worcester Tech		–		6	–	0	–	0
No. 18 Villanova		–		8	–	0	–	1
No. 9 Holy Cross		–		8	–	1	–	0
Boston College		–		6	–	1	–	2
No. 15 Fordham		–		6	–	1	–	2
No. 12 Cornell		–		5	–	1	–	1
Army		–		8	–	2	–	0
No. 8 Pittsburgh		–		8	–	2	–	0
No. 6 Carnegie Tech		–		7	–	2	–	0
No. 20 Dartmouth		–		7	–	2	–	0
Vermont		–		4	–	2	–	1
Brown		–		5	–	3	–	0
Bucknell		–		5	–	3	–	0
Syracuse		–		5	–	3	–	0
CCNY		–		4	–	3	–	0
Penn		–		3	–	2	–	3
Manhattan		–		5	–	4	–	0
Harvard		–		4	–	4	–	0
La Salle		–		4	–	4	–	0
NYU		–		4	–	4	–	0
Boston University		–		3	–	4	–	1
Penn State		–		3	–	4	–	1
Princeton		–		3	–	4	–	1
Hofstra		–		2	–	3	–	1
Duquesne		–		4	–	6	–	0
Temple		–		3	–	6	–	1
Providence		–		3	–	5	–	0
Columbia		–		3	–	6	–	0
Massachusetts State		–		3	–	6	–	0
Colgate		–		2	–	5	–	0
Buffalo		–		2	–	6	–	0
Yale		–		2	–	6	–	0
Tufts		–		1	–	6	–	1
Rankings from AP Poll

The 1938 Carnegie Tech Tartans football team represented the Carnegie Institute of Technology as an independent during the 1938 college football season. The Tartans were led by second-year head coach Bill Kern and played their home games at Pitt Stadium in Pittsburgh.

The team first came to national attention after winning a close game against Northeastern power Holy Cross, who were on a 13-game unbeaten streak. Another big win came when the Tartans upset cross-town rival and defending national champion Pittsburgh, snapping their 22-game winning streak.

They finished the regular season at 7–1 and were ranked sixth in the final AP poll, the only Carnegie Tech team to ever finish ranked. The Tartans were awarded the third ever Lambert Trophy, distinguishing them as the best college football team in the East. They were invited to their first and only bowl game in school history, the Sugar Bowl in New Orleans, where they led at halftime but lost to national champion TCU, 15–7.

== Schedule ==
Date	Opponent	Rank	Site	Result	Attendance	Source
October 1	Davis & Elkins		Pitt Stadium; Pittsburgh, PA	W 49–0		
October 8	Wittenberg		Pitt Stadium; Pittsburgh, PA	W 32–13		
October 15	Holy Cross		Pitt Stadium; Pittsburgh, PA	W 7–6		
October 22	at No. 5 Notre Dame	No. 13	Notre Dame Stadium; Notre Dame, IN	L 0–7	25,934	
October 29	Akron	No. 16	Pitt Stadium; Pittsburgh, PA	W 27–13		
November 5	vs. No. 1 Pittsburgh	No. 19	Pitt Stadium; Pittsburgh, PA	W 20–10		
November 12	vs. Duquesne	No. 6	Pitt Stadium; Pittsburgh, PA	W 21–0		
November 26	at NC State	No. 7	Riddick Stadium; Raleigh, NC	W 14–0		
January 2, 1939	vs. No. 1 TCU	No. 6	Tulane Stadium; New Orleans, LA (Sugar Bowl)	L 7–15	44,308	
Rankings from AP Poll released prior to the game; Source:
