= 1938 Cornell Big Red football team =

American college football season

1938 Cornell Big Red football
- Conference: Independent

Ranking
- AP: No. 12
- Record: 5–1–1
- Head coach: Carl Snavely (3rd season)
- Offensive scheme: Single-wing
- Captain: Al Van Ranst
- Home stadium: Schoellkopf Field

1938 Eastern college football independents records
	Conf.			Overall
Team	W	L	T	W		L		T
Worcester Tech		–		6	–	0	–	0
No. 18 Villanova		–		8	–	0	–	1
No. 9 Holy Cross		–		8	–	1	–	0
Boston College		–		6	–	1	–	2
No. 15 Fordham		–		6	–	1	–	2
No. 12 Cornell		–		5	–	1	–	1
Army		–		8	–	2	–	0
No. 8 Pittsburgh		–		8	–	2	–	0
No. 6 Carnegie Tech		–		7	–	2	–	0
No. 20 Dartmouth		–		7	–	2	–	0
Vermont		–		4	–	2	–	1
Brown		–		5	–	3	–	0
Bucknell		–		5	–	3	–	0
Syracuse		–		5	–	3	–	0
CCNY		–		4	–	3	–	0
Penn		–		3	–	2	–	3
Manhattan		–		5	–	4	–	0
Harvard		–		4	–	4	–	0
La Salle		–		4	–	4	–	0
NYU		–		4	–	4	–	0
Boston University		–		3	–	4	–	1
Penn State		–		3	–	4	–	1
Princeton		–		3	–	4	–	1
Hofstra		–		2	–	3	–	1
Duquesne		–		4	–	6	–	0
Temple		–		3	–	6	–	1
Providence		–		3	–	5	–	0
Columbia		–		3	–	6	–	0
Massachusetts State		–		3	–	6	–	0
Colgate		–		2	–	5	–	0
Buffalo		–		2	–	6	–	0
Yale		–		2	–	6	–	0
Tufts		–		1	–	6	–	1
Rankings from AP Poll

The 1938 Cornell Big Red football team was an American football team that represented Cornell University during the 1938 college football season. In their third season under head coach Carl Snavely, the Big Red compiled a 5–1–1 record and outscored their opponents by a combined total of 110 to 55.

== Schedule ==
Date	Opponent	Rank	Site	Result	Attendance	Source
October 1	Colgate		Schoellkopf Field; Ithaca, NY (rivalry)	W 15–6		
October 8	at Harvard		Harvard Stadium; Boston, MA	W 20–0	35,000	
October 15	at Syracuse		Archbold Stadium; Syracuse, NY	L 17–19	25,000	
October 22	Penn State		Schoellkopf Field; Ithaca, NY	W 21–6	7,000	
October 29	at Columbia	No. 17	Baker Field; New York, NY (rivalry)	W 23–7	34,000	
November 12	No. 5 Dartmouth	No. 20	Schoellkopf Field; Ithaca, NY (rivalry)	W 14–7		
November 24	at Penn	No. 10	Franklin Field; Philadelphia, PA (rivalry)	T 0–0		
Rankings from AP Poll released prior to the game
