= 1938 Syracuse Orangemen football team =

American college football season

1938 Syracuse Orangemen football
- Conference: Independent
- Record: 5–3
- Head coach: Ossie Solem (2nd season)
- Captain: James Bruett
- Home stadium: Archbold Stadium

1938 Eastern college football independents records
	Conf.			Overall
Team	W	L	T	W		L		T
Worcester Tech		–		6	–	0	–	0
No. 18 Villanova		–		8	–	0	–	1
No. 9 Holy Cross		–		8	–	1	–	0
Boston College		–		6	–	1	–	2
No. 15 Fordham		–		6	–	1	–	2
No. 12 Cornell		–		5	–	1	–	1
Army		–		8	–	2	–	0
No. 8 Pittsburgh		–		8	–	2	–	0
No. 6 Carnegie Tech		–		7	–	2	–	0
No. 20 Dartmouth		–		7	–	2	–	0
Vermont		–		4	–	2	–	1
Brown		–		5	–	3	–	0
Bucknell		–		5	–	3	–	0
Syracuse		–		5	–	3	–	0
CCNY		–		4	–	3	–	0
Penn		–		3	–	2	–	3
Manhattan		–		5	–	4	–	0
Harvard		–		4	–	4	–	0
La Salle		–		4	–	4	–	0
NYU		–		4	–	4	–	0
Boston University		–		3	–	4	–	1
Penn State		–		3	–	4	–	1
Princeton		–		3	–	4	–	1
Hofstra		–		2	–	3	–	1
Duquesne		–		4	–	6	–	0
Temple		–		3	–	6	–	1
Providence		–		3	–	5	–	0
Columbia		–		3	–	6	–	0
Massachusetts State		–		3	–	6	–	0
Colgate		–		2	–	5	–	0
Buffalo		–		2	–	6	–	0
Yale		–		2	–	6	–	0
Tufts		–		1	–	6	–	1
Rankings from AP Poll

The 1938 Syracuse Orangemen football team represented Syracuse University as an independent during the 1938 college football season. The Orangemen were led by second-year head coach Ossie Solem and played their home games at Archbold Stadium in Syracuse, New York. Syracuse beat Colgate on November 5 at Archbold Stadium, the first in the Colgate–Syracuse football rivalry since 1924.

== Schedule ==
Date	Opponent	Rank	Site	Result	Attendance	Source
September 30	Clarkson		Archbold Stadium; Syracuse, NY	W 27–0	15,000	
October 8	Maryland		Archbold Stadium; Syracuse, NY	W 53–0	12,000	
October 15	Cornell		Archbold Stadium; Syracuse, NY	W 19–17	25,000	
October 22	at Michigan State	No. 10	Macklin Field; East Lansing, MI	L 12–19	18,000	
October 29	at Penn State		New Beaver Field; University Park, PA (rivalry)	L 6–33	10,659	
November 5	Colgate		Archbold Stadium; Syracuse, NY (rivalry)	W 7–0	35,000	
November 12	No. 7 Duke		Archbold Stadium; Syracuse, NY	L 0–21	27,500	
November 19	at Columbia		Baker Field; New York, NY	W 13–12	20,000	
Rankings from AP Poll released prior to the game
