= 1938 college football rankings =

- Season: 1938
- Bowl season: 1938–39 bowl games
- End of season champions: TCU (Note: per AP poll, Williamson System, Helms Athletic Foundation, National Championship Foundation); Tennessee (Note: per Boand System, Dunkel System, Houlgate System, Litkenhous Ratings, Poling System, Berryman QPRS, Billingsley Report, College Football Researchers Association, Sagarin Ratings Elo chess method, and Sagarin Ratings Predictor method); Notre Dame (Note: per Dickinson System) (not claimed)

One human poll and several ranking methods determined the 1938 college football rankings. Unlike most sports, college football's governing body, the NCAA, did not itself bestow a national championship.

== Champions (by ranking) ==
The AP Poll and three other major rankings consider TCU as the season's champion. Eight major rankings consider Tennessee the season's champion. The Dickinson System considers Notre Dame the season's champion:

- AP poll: TCU
- Berryman QPRS: Tennessee
- Billingsley Report: Tennessee
- Boand System: Tennessee
- College Football Researchers Association: Tennessee
- Dickinson System: Notre Dame
- Dunkel System: Tennessee
- Helms Athletic Foundation: TCU
- Houlgate System: Tennessee
- Litkenhous Ratings: Tennessee
- National Championship Foundation: TCU
- Poling System: Tennessee
- Sagarin Ratings Elo chess method: Tennessee
- Sagarin Ratings Predictor method: Tennessee
- Williamson System: TCU

Note: AP poll, Boand System, Dickinson System, Dunkel System, Houlgate System, Litkenhous Ratings, Poling System, and Williamson System were given contemporarily. All other methods were given retroactively.

== AP Poll ==
=== Legend ===
	Increase in ranking
	Decrease in ranking
	Not ranked previous week
	National champion
(#–#)	Win–loss record
(Italics)	Number of first place votes
т	Tied with team above or below also with this symbol

The scheduled final AP Poll was released on November 29, with Notre Dame No. 1, prior to their season-end game against Southern California.

The poll was extended for one week due to the "select quality of last Saturday's games, three of which had a direct bearing on the ranking".

The revised final AP Poll was released on December 6, at the end of the regular season, still weeks before the major bowls. The AP would not release a post-bowl season final poll regularly until 1968.

	Week 1 Oct 17	Week 2 Oct 24	Week 3 Oct 31	Week 4 Nov 7	Week 5 Nov 14	Week 6 Nov 21	Week 7 (Scheduled final) Nov 28	Week 8 (Extended final) Dec 6	
1.	Pittsburgh (4–0) (83)	Pittsburgh (5–0) (90)	Pittsburgh (6–0) (105)	TCU (7–0) (48)	Notre Dame (7–0) (60)	Notre Dame (7–0) (48)	Notre Dame (8–0) (48)	TCU (10–0) (55)	1.
2.	Minnesota (4–0) (6)	Minnesota (4–0) (1)	TCU (6–0) (8)	Notre Dame (6–0) (41)	TCU (8–0) (19)	TCU (9–0) (28)	TCU (10–0) (23)	Tennessee (10–0) (16)	2.
3.	California (5–0) (1)	California (6–0) (3)	California (7–0)	Pittsburgh (6–1) (14)	Tennessee (8–0) (5)	Duke (8–0) (3)	Duke (9–0) (15)	Duke (9–0) (11)	3.
4.	Dartmouth (4–0) (1)	TCU (5–0) (3)	Notre Dame (5–0)	Tennessee (7–0) (6)	Duke (7–0) (5)	Pittsburgh (8–1) (2) т	Tennessee (9–0) (4)	Oklahoma (10–0)	4.
5.	Notre Dame (3–0)	Santa Clara (4–0) (1)	Dartmouth (6–0)	Dartmouth (7–0)	Pittsburgh (7–1) (2)	Tennessee (8–0) (3) т	Oklahoma (9–0)	Notre Dame (8–1) (4)	5.
6.	Santa Clara (3–0)	Dartmouth (5–0)	Tennessee (6–0) (1)	Carnegie Tech (5–1)	Carnegie Tech (6–1)	Oklahoma (8–0)	Carnegie Tech (7–1)	Carnegie Tech (7–1)	6.
7.	TCU (4–0) (3)	Notre Dame (4–0) (1)	Northwestern (4–0–1)	Duke (6–0)	Oklahoma (7–0) (1)	Carnegie Tech (6–1)	Pittsburgh (8–2)	USC (8–2) (1)	7.
8.	Tennessee (4–0)	Tennessee (5–0)	Santa Clara (5–0)	Santa Clara (6–0) (1)	Cornell (5–1)	Minnesota (6–2)	USC (7–2)	Pittsburgh (8–2)	8.
9.	Duke (4–0)	Fordham (3–0–1) (1)	Duke (6–0)	USC (6–1) (2)	California (8–1)	California (9–1)	Holy Cross (8–1)	Holy Cross (8–1)	9.
10.	Syracuse (3–0)	Oklahoma (4–0)	Fordham (3–1–1)	Oklahoma (6–0) (1)	Holy Cross (7–1)	Cornell (5–1)	Minnesota (6–2)	Minnesota (6–2)	10.
11.	Fordham (2–0–1)	Duke (5–0)	Oklahoma (5–0)	Holy Cross (6–1)	Santa Clara (6–1)	Holy Cross (7–1)	Cornell (5–1–1)	Texas Tech (10–0)	11.
12.	Michigan (2–1)	Northwestern (3–0–1)	Minnesota (4–1)	Minnesota (5–1)	Wisconsin (5–2)	Michigan (6–1–1)	California (9–1)	Cornell (5–1–1)	12.
13.	Carnegie Tech (3–0)	Michigan (3–1)	Holy Cross (5–1) т	Fordham (4–1–1)	USC (6–2)	Dartmouth (7–1)	Fordham (6–1–2)	Alabama (7–1–1)	13.
14.	Oklahoma (3–0)	Holy Cross (4–1)	USC (5–1) т	California (7–1)	Dartmouth (7–1)	USC (6–2)	Texas Tech (10–0)	California (10–1)	14.
15.	Alabama (3–1)	Villanova (4–0)	Alabama (5–1)	Wisconsin (4–2)	Villanova (6–0–1)	Northwestern (4–2–2)	Villanova (8–0–1)	Fordham (6–1–2)	15.
16.	Vanderbilt (4–0)	Carnegie Tech (3–1)	Cornell (4–1) т	Alabama (6–1)	Northwestern (4–1–2)	Villanova (7–0–1)	Michigan (6–1–1)	Michigan (6–1–1)	16.
17.	Baylor (4–0)	Cornell (3–1)	Michigan (4–1) т	Northwestern (4–1–1)	Michigan (5–1–1)	Texas Tech (9–0)	Alabama (7–1–1)	Northwestern (4–2–2)	17.
18.	Northwestern (2–0–1)	Alabama (4–1)	Iowa State (6–0)	Michigan (5–1) (1)	Fordham (4–1–2)	Fordham (5–1–2)	Tulane (7–2–1)	Villanova (8–0–1)	18.
19.	North Carolina (3–1)	USC (4–1)	Carnegie Tech (4–1) т	Villanova (5–0–1)	Texas Tech (8–0)	Santa Clara (6–1)	Northwestern (4–2–2)	Tulane (7–2–1)	19.
20.	Villanova (3–0)	Ohio State (2–1–1)	Texas A&M (3–2–1) т	Cornell (4–1)	Alabama (6–1–1)	Georgetown (8–0)	Dartmouth (7–2)	Dartmouth (7–2)	20.
	Week 1 Oct 17	Week 2 Oct 24	Week 3 Oct 31	Week 4 Nov 7	Week 5 Nov 14	Week 6 Nov 21	Week 7 (Scheduled final) Nov 28	Week 8 (Extended final) Dec 6	
		Dropped: Baylor; North Carolina; Syracuse; Vanderbilt	Dropped: Ohio State; Villanova	Dropped: Iowa State; Texas A&M	Dropped: Minnesota	Dropped: Alabama; Wisconsin	Dropped: Georgetown; Santa Clara	None	

== Houlgate System ==
	Week Final December 6	
1.	Tennessee (A 35)	1.
2.	Notre Dame (B 30)	2.
3.	Duke (A 27)	3.
4.	Oklahoma (A 25)	4.
5.	Texas Christian (A 24)	5.
6.	Southern California (C 23)	6.
7.	California (B 22)	7.
8.	Pittsburgh (C 22)	8.
9.	Holy Cross (B 21)	9.
10.	Alabama (C 20)	10.
	Week Final December 6	

== Litkenhous Ratings ==
The top teams in the Litkenhous Ratings for 1938 were as follows:

1. Tennessee
2. TCU
3. USC
4. Notre Dame
5. Holy Cross
6. Pittsburgh
7. Cornell
8. Fordham
9. Minnesota
10. Michigan
11. Northwestern
12. California

== Boand/Azzi Ratem ==
1. Tennessee
2. Notre Dame
3. TCU
4. USC
5. California
6. Oklahoma
7. Duke
8. Pittsburgh
9. Holy Cross
10. Minnesota
11. Villanova
12. Michigan

== Poling ==
1. Tennessee
2. TCU
3. USC
4. Notre Dame
5. California
6. Oklahoma
7. Duke
8. Holy Cross
9. Pittsburgh
10. Minnesota
11. Alabama
12. Carnegie Tech

== Williamson ==
1-2. Tennessee
1-2. TCU
3. Notre Dame
4. Carnegie Tech
5. Holy Cross
6. Alabama
7. USC
8. Duke
9. Oklahoma
10. Pittsburgh
11. Minnesota
12. Villanova

== See also ==
- 1938 College Football All-America Team
