= 1939 Chicago Cardinals season =

American football team season

- Head coach: Ernie Nevers
- Home stadium: Wrigley Field

Results
- Record: 1–10
- Division place: 5th NFL Western
- Playoffs: Did not qualify

The 1939 Chicago Cardinals season was their 20th year in the National Football League (NFL). The team failed to improve on their previous output of 2–9, winning only one game. They played eight of their eleven games on the road and failed to qualify for the league's Championship Playoff for the 7th consecutive season.

== Offseason ==
=== NFL draft ===
1939 Chicago Cardinals draft
Round	Pick	Player	Position	College	Notes
1	1	Charles "Ki Aldrich *	Center	TCU	
2	12	Marshall Goldberg	Back	Pittsburgh	
3	16	Alvord Wolff	Tackle	Santa Clara	
4	27	Hal (Curly) Stebbins	Back	Pittsburgh	
5	31	Bill Daddio	End	Pittsburgh	played with Cardinals from 1941–42
6	42	George Faust	Blocking back	Minnesota	
7	51	Bill Dwyer	Back	New Mexico	
8	62	Sherm Hinkebein	Center	Kentucky	
9	71	Earl Brown	End	Notre Dame	
10	82	Earl Crowder	Blocking Back	Oklahoma	
11	91	Bowden Wyatt	End	Tennessee	
12	102	Jim Thomas	Guard	Oklahoma	
13	111	Andy Sabados	Guard	The Citadel	
14	122	Blase Miatovich	Tackle	San Francisco	
15	131	Russ Clarke	Guard	Santa Clara	
16	142	Gus Goins	End	Clemson	
17	151	Ev Elkins	Back	Marshall	played with Cardinals in 1940
18	162	Frank Huffman	Tackle	Marshall	
19	171	Mike Kochel	Guard	Fordham	
20	182	Tom Rice	Tackle	San Francisco	
Made roster * Made at least one Pro Bowl during career

== Schedule ==
Week	Date	Opponent	Result	Record	Venue	Attendance	Recap	Sources
1	September 10	at **Detroit Lions**	**L** 13–21	0–1	University of Detroit Stadium			
2	September 17	at **Green Bay Packers**	**L** 10–14	0–2	City Stadium			
3	September 24	at Pittsburgh Pirates	**W** 10–0	1–2	Forbes Field			
4	October 1	**Detroit Lions**	**L** 3–17	1–3	Soldier Field			
5	October 8	at **Green Bay Packers**	**L** 20–27	1–4	Wisconsin State Fair Park			
6	October 15	at **Chicago Bears**	**L** 7–44	1–5	Wrigley Field			
7	October 22	**Cleveland Rams**	**L** 0–24	1–6	Wrigley Field			
8	Bye							
9	November 5	at **Cleveland Rams**	**L** 0–14	1–7	Cleveland Municipal Stadium			
10	November 12	at New York Giants	**L** 7–17	1–8	Polo Grounds			
11	November 19	at Washington Redskins	**L** 7–28	1–9	Griffith Stadium			
12	November 26	**Chicago Bears**	**L** 7–48	1–10	Wrigley Field			
13	Bye							
Note: Intra-division opponents are in **bold** text.

== Roster ==
1939 Chicago Cardinals final roster
Backs: 11 Sam Agee FB/LB; 13 Earl Crowder RB/CB/S; 53 George Faust RB/S/P; 10 Ev Fisher RB/S; 42 Marshall Goldberg RB/CB; 21 Bert Johnson FB/LB/P; 15 Buddy Parker FB/LB; 24 Frank Patrick FB/LB/P; 66 Milt Popovich RB/CB/P; 55 Jack Robbins RB/CB; 14 Ernie Wheeler FB/LB	Linemen/Linebackers: 48 Ki Aldrich C/LB; 46 Al Babartsky T/DT; 22 Conway Baker T/DT; 23 Tony Blazine T/DT; 28 Ross Carter G/DG; 49 Frank Huffman G/DG; 35 Mike Kochel G/DG; 38 Andy Sabados G/DG; 41 Jim Thomas G/DG; 12 Frank Zelencik DT/T	Ends/Receivers: 45 Versil Deskin; 56 John Klumb; 17 Joel Mason; 40 Bill Smith K; rookies in italics

== Standings ==
NFL Western Division
	W	L	T	PCT	DIV	PF	PA	STK
Green Bay Packers	9	2	0	.818	6–2	233	153	W4
Chicago Bears	8	3	0	.727	6–2	298	157	W4
Detroit Lions	6	5	0	.545	4–4	145	150	L4
Cleveland Rams	5	5	1	.500	4–4	195	164	W1
Chicago Cardinals	1	10	0	.091	0–8	84	254	L8

Note: Tie games were not officially counted in the standings until 1972.
