= 1938 Pittsburgh Panthers football team =

American college football season

1938 Pittsburgh Panthers football
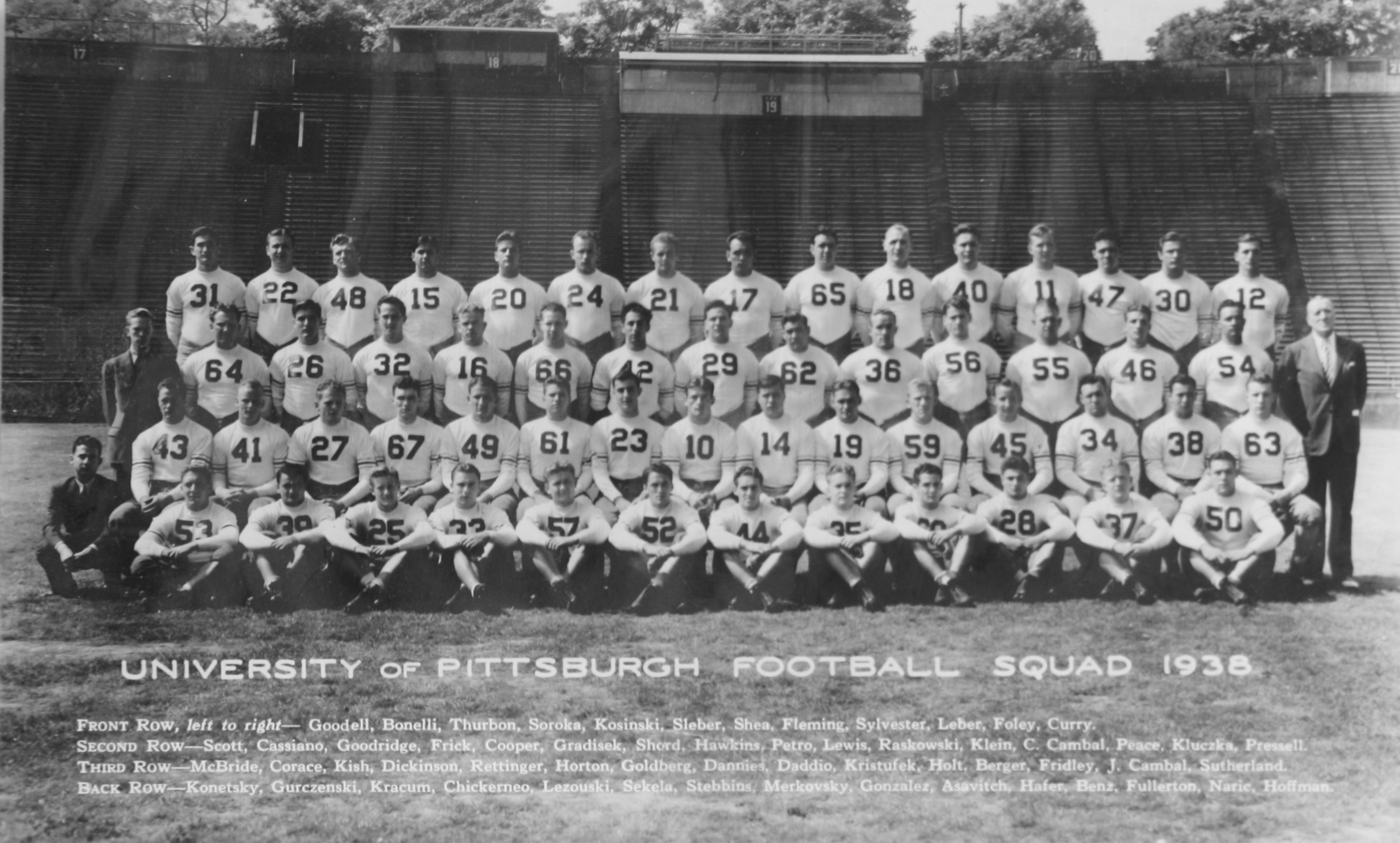
- Conference: Independent

Ranking
- AP: No. 8
- Record: 8–2
- Head coach: Jock Sutherland (15th season)
- Offensive scheme: Single-wing
- Home stadium: Pitt Stadium

1938 Eastern college football independents records
	Conf.			Overall
Team	W	L	T	W		L		T
Worcester Tech		–		6	–	0	–	0
No. 18 Villanova		–		8	–	0	–	1
No. 9 Holy Cross		–		8	–	1	–	0
Boston College		–		6	–	1	–	2
No. 15 Fordham		–		6	–	1	–	2
No. 12 Cornell		–		5	–	1	–	1
Army		–		8	–	2	–	0
No. 8 Pittsburgh		–		8	–	2	–	0
No. 6 Carnegie Tech		–		7	–	2	–	0
No. 20 Dartmouth		–		7	–	2	–	0
Vermont		–		4	–	2	–	1
Brown		–		5	–	3	–	0
Bucknell		–		5	–	3	–	0
Syracuse		–		5	–	3	–	0
CCNY		–		4	–	3	–	0
Penn		–		3	–	2	–	3
Manhattan		–		5	–	4	–	0
Harvard		–		4	–	4	–	0
La Salle		–		4	–	4	–	0
NYU		–		4	–	4	–	0
Boston University		–		3	–	4	–	1
Penn State		–		3	–	4	–	1
Princeton		–		3	–	4	–	1
Hofstra		–		2	–	3	–	1
Duquesne		–		4	–	6	–	0
Temple		–		3	–	6	–	1
Providence		–		3	–	5	–	0
Columbia		–		3	–	6	–	0
Massachusetts State		–		3	–	6	–	0
Colgate		–		2	–	5	–	0
Buffalo		–		2	–	6	–	0
Yale		–		2	–	6	–	0
Tufts		–		1	–	6	–	1
Rankings from AP Poll

The 1938 Pittsburgh Panthers football team represented the University of Pittsburgh as an independent during the 1938 college football season. The Panthers compiled a record of 8–2 in their final season under 15th -year head coach Jock Sutherland, and were ranked eighth in the final AP poll.

== Schedule ==
Date	Opponent	Rank	Site	Result	Attendance	Source
September 24	West Virginia		Pitt Stadium; Pittsburgh, PA (rivalry)	W 19–0	34,500	
October 1	at Temple		Temple Stadium; Philadelphia, PA	W 28–6	41,728	
October 8	Duquesne		Pitt Stadium; Pittsburgh, PA	W 27–0	36,000–37,000	
October 15	at Wisconsin		Camp Randall Stadium; Madison, WI	W 26–6	26,197	
October 22	SMU	No. 1	Pitt Stadium; Pittsburgh, PA	W 34–7	37,500	
October 29	No. 9 Fordham	No. 1	Pitt Stadium; Pittsburgh, PA	W 24–13	68,918–75,867	
November 5	No. 19 Carnegie Tech	No. 1	Pitt Stadium; Pittsburgh, PA	L 10–20	61,000	
November 12	at Nebraska	No. 3	Memorial Stadium; Lincoln, NE	W 19–0	35,000	
November 19	Penn State	No. 5	Pitt Stadium; Pittsburgh, PA (rivalry)	W 26–0	14,000–16,881	
November 26	at No. 3 Duke	No. 4	Duke Stadium; Durham, NC	L 0–7	49,138–52,000	
Rankings from AP Poll released prior to the game

== Preseason ==
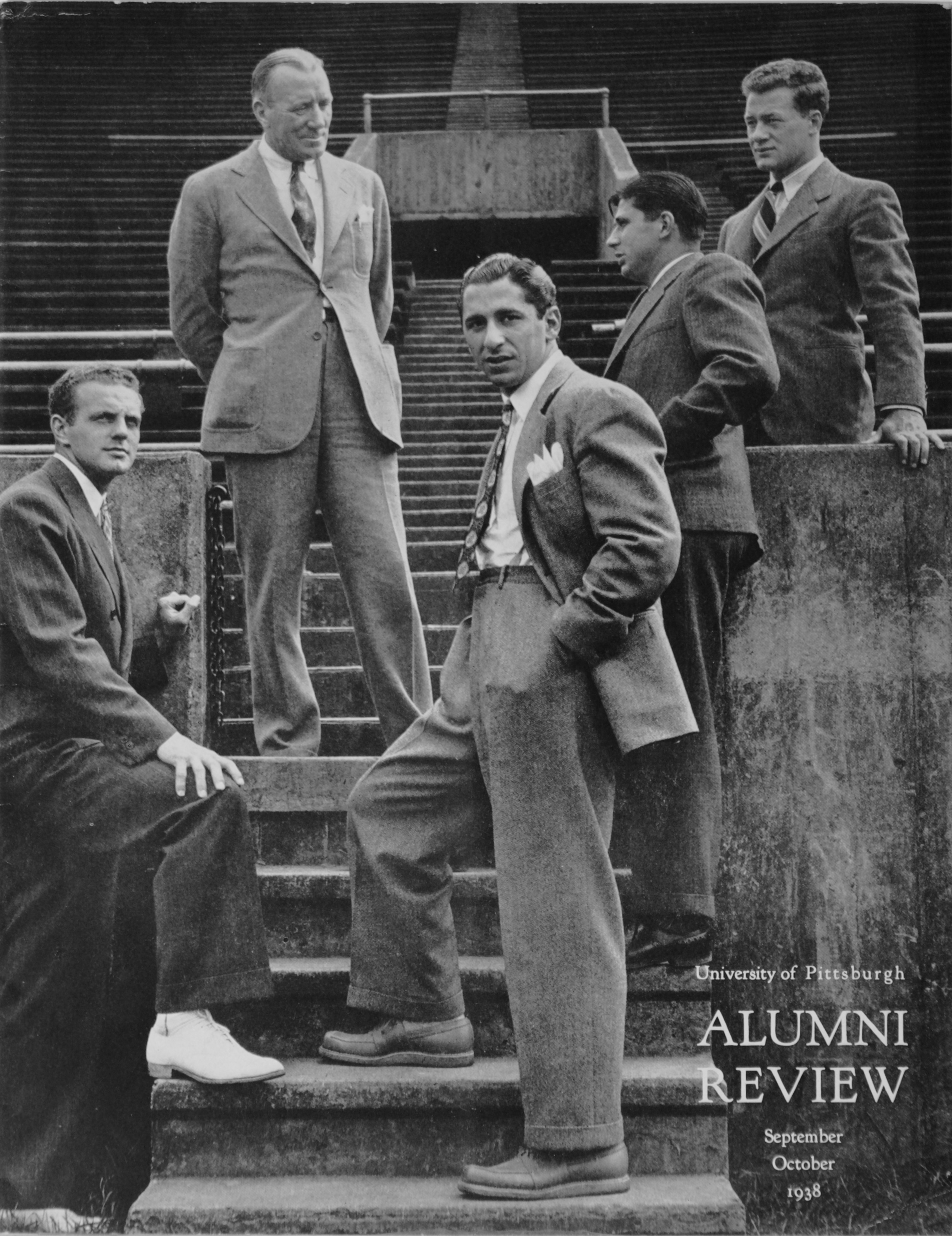
Dream Backfield (Harold Stebbins, Marshall Goldberg, John Chickerneo and Dick Cassiano) with Coach Sutherland

Chancellor John Bowman was not happy that the football team turned down the 1938 Rose Bowl bid and essentially cost the university the $100,000 payday. In February he set in motion the Bowman Plan for athletics at Pitt. The first order of business was to eliminate the Athletic Council and form an all-faculty board in charge of athletics. According to Chester L. Smith of The Pittsburgh Press the Bowman Plan would: "1 – Discourage all forms of alumni help to athletes. 2 – Attempt to deflate football and elevate other sports.. 3 – Bar all forms of recruiting, be they ever so subtle, by officials or coaches of the University. 4 – Limit future football schedules to eight games. 5 – Limit practice sessions for all forms of sport to not more than two hours daily; name Sept. 10 for the opening of preseason football workouts. No restrictions are placed on spring football drills." David Finoli noted in When Pitt Ruled the Gridiron: "Bowman decided he would tighten the noose around the program by taking away the $300 payments of their tuition unless they worked even more hours a day to pay for it starting with the 1938 freshman class....The student-athletes would also be required to move along with their class if they wanted to be eligible to play, which, while an understandable requirement from an academic standpoint, in major college football at the time was almost a death knell." Coach Sutherland approved the plan, but was in favor of de-emphasizing the schedule as well. He stated in Jock Sutherland - Architect of Men by Harry G. Scott: "I know that it is unfair and even dangerous to de-emphasize without also de-emphasizing the schedules. I consider it unfair to send other men's sons out to play without proper talent and without even a chance to win. It would be unwise to put minor league players into heavy major league competition." At a Westmoreland County Pitt Club meeting, when asked about the specifics of the restrictive plans, Coach Sutherland would only say: "It looks like we have made the mistake of winning too many football games."

Assistant coach Charles Bowser resigned for business reasons and center coach Dr. Ralph Daugherty resigned to practice medicine full time. Coach Sutherland hired recent graduates, center Don Hensley and quarterback John Michelosen, to his staff and moved Alec Fox into the assistant coach slot.

On March 15, 1938, Coach Sutherland began his 15th and last spring practice on the Trees practice field. Sixty players showed up for the first day of drills. The "Dream Backfield" was formed when Marshall Goldberg approached coach Sutherland: "Dr. Sutherland, I know the team needs a fullback. Dick Cassiano is a wonderful halfback. Why not let him take my place at that position, and make a fullback out of me?" Sutherland countered that Goldberg was an All-American halfback and might sacrifice that rating his senior year if he switched positions. Goldberg answered: "Oh, that's all right, if you think I can give the team what it needs at fullback, I don't mind if I'm not named All-American again." Two weeks into drills the squad was reduced by the new rules concerning academics. According to The Pitt News: "Somewhere between twelve and twenty-three varsity gridmen were declared ineligible at least for the all-important spring drills." Starting tackle Ted Schmidt and second string tackle George Musulin were dismissed from the squad because they violated the newly instituted eight semester rule. After five and a half weeks of drilling, the annual alumni versus varsity game officially closed the session. The varsity prevailed 21–0. Sophomore halfback Robert Thurbon scored two touchdowns and halfback Emil Narick tallied one to lead the varsity attack.

On September 5 Coach Sutherland welcomed 56 aspirants to fall practice. The squad was housed and fed at the Pittsburgh Athletic Association and was drilled twice a day until the start of fall classes. They completed the two-week session with an intra-squad scrimmage won by the varsity 34–7. Halfback Harold Stebbins tallied twice and Dick Cassiano, Ben Kish and Marshall Goldberg scored the other touchdowns for the first team. In the fourth quarter, Halfback Emil Narick caught a touchdown pass from Charles Shea for the second team score. Bill Daddio converted four of five extra point attempts and Frank Goodell was successful after Narick's score.

== Coaching staff ==
1938 Pittsburgh Panthers football staff
Coaching staff: John B. "Jock" Sutherland – Head coach; Alex Fox – Assistant coach; John Michelosen – backfield coach; Harold Williams – backfield coach; Don Hensley – center coach; Michael Nicksick – backfield coach; Edward Schultz – end coach; Walter Milligan– Freshman coach	Support staff: Dr. H. A. Ralph Shanor – team physician; Roland Logan – team trainer; Frank Scott – varsity equipment manager; James Hagan - director of athletics; Frank Carver – publicity director; William McBride – varsity student manager

== Roster ==
1938 Pittsburgh Panthers football roster
Player	Position	Games	Height	Weight	Class	Prep School	Hometown
Stephen Petro*	guard	10	6' 1"	189	1939	Johnstown H. S.	Johnstown, PA
John Benz	tackle	3	6' 3"	215	1941	Peabody H. S.	Pittsburgh, PA
Fabian Hoffman*	end	10	6'	178	193	Central Catholic H. S.	Pittsburgh, PA
Gerald Lewis	guard	4	5' 9"	195	1941	Emporium H. S.	Emporium, PA
John Chickerneo*	quarterback	10	6'	190	1939	Warren H. S.	Warren, OH
Joseph Rettinger*	end	9	5' 11"	180	1941	Ashland H. S.	Ashland, PA
Elmer Merkovsky*	tackle	10	6' 1"	205	1939	Scott H. S.	North Braddock. PA
Ben Asavitch	tackle	3	6' 2"	200	1939	Wilkes-Barre Memorial H. S.	Wilkes-Barre, PA
Walter Raskowski*	guard	10	5' 11"	196	1939	New Castle H. S.	New Castle, PA
Albin Lezouski*	guard	10	6'	185	1939	Mahonoy City H. S.	Mahonoy, PA
Harold Stebbins*	halfback	10	6' 1"	185	1939	Williamsport H. S.	Williamsport, PA
Albert Gurczenski	tackle	4	6' 2"	194	1941	Jeannette H. S.	Jeannette, PA
Harris Hawkins	center	5	6'	167	1941	New Martinsville H. S.	New Martinsville, WV
Michael Sekela	fullback	9	6' 1"	192	1941	Windber H. S.	Windber, PA
Robert Thurbon*	halfback	9	5' 10"	170	1941	Erie H. S.	Erie, PA
Benjamin Kish*	fullback	9	6'	189	1940	Tonawanda H. S.	Tonowanda, NY
Alvin Leber	fullback	3	5' 9"	170	1941	Monongahela H. S.	Monongahela, PA
Robert Dannies*	center	10	5' 11"	200	1939	Westmont H. S. (PA)	Wauwatosa, WI
Emil Narick*	quarterback	10	6'	180	1940	Union H. S.	Benwood, WV
Thaddeus Konetsky*	tackle	10	6' 2"	198	1941	German Township H. S.	German Township, PA
John Dickinson*	end	8	6' 1"	190	1940	Peabody H. S.	Pittsburgh, PA
Lawrence Peace*	halfback	10	5' 10"	190	1940	Bradford H. S.	Bradford, PA
Charles Fleming	end	4	5' 8"	170	1939	New Castle H. S.	New Castle, PA
Frank Kristufek*	tackle	8	5' 11"	198	1940	McKeesport H. S.	McKeesport, PA
Ernest Bonelli	halfback	5	5' 10"	182	1941	Aspinwall H. S.	Aspinwall, PA
Ralph Hafer	tackle	6	6' 2"	185	1940	Dormont H. S.	Dormont, PA
John Goodridge*	end	10	6'	175	1941	Washington H. S.	Washington, PA
Marshall Goldberg*	halfback	9	6'	186	1939	Elkins H. S.	Elkins, WVA
Richard Cassiano*	halfback	10	5' 10"	170	1940	Albany H. S.	Albany, NY
Walter Fridley	quarterback	1	5' 11"	175	1941	Kane H. S.	Kane, PA
Richard Fullerton*	center	9	6' 1"	185	1940	Madison H. S.	Madison, NJ
George Kracum	halfback	3	6'	180	1941	Hazelton H. S.	Hazelton, PA
Rudolph Gradisek*	guard	10	5' 11"	193	1941	Sewickley Township H. S.	Herminie, PA
Frank Goodell	fullback	5	5' 9"	185	1940	Curtis H. S.	Staten Island, NY
Harold Klein*	guard	10	5' 10"	176	1940	Altoona H. S.	Altoona, PA
William Daddio*	end	10	5' 11"	191	1939	Meadville H. S.	Meadville, PA
Arthur Corace	guard	2	6'	192	1940	Carrick H. S.	Carrick, PA
Clement Cambal	fullback	1	5' 10"	174	1939	Springdale H. S.	Springdale, PA
Joseph Cambal	tackle	3	6'	202	1940	Kiskiminetas Springs H. S.	Springdale, PA
Willard Curry	center	1	5' 11"	190	1939		East McKeesport, PA
Charles Shea	halfback	3	5' 10"	155	1939		Pittsburgh, PA
Alfred Berger	tackle	0	6'	218	1939	Allegheny H. S.	Pittsburgh, PA
Leslie Holt	end	1	6' 2"	178	1940	Meadville H. S.	Meadville, PA
James Kosinski	quarterback	1	5' 9"	165	1939	Sheffield H. S.	Pittsburgh, PA
Earl Shord	fullback	0	5' 11"	185	1940		Pittsburgh, PA
Stephen Horton	end	1	6'	170	1940		Pittsburgh, PA
George Soroka	halfback	1	5' 8"	150	1940		Pittsburgh, PA
Jack Cooper	halfback	0	5' 11"	160	1941	Dormont H. S.	Dormont, PA
Paul Foley	guard	3	5' 10"	185	1941	Swissvale H. S.	Swissvale, PA
William Frick	center	0	5' 10"	180	1941	Taylor Allderdice H. S.	Pittsburgh, PA
Poldo Gonzalez	tackle	0	6' 2"	200	1941	Victory H. S.	Clarksburg, WV
Andrew Kluczka	guard	0	5' 9"	180	1941	McKeesport H. S.	McKeesport, PA
Earl Pressel	halfback	0	6'	182	1941	Holidaysburg H. S.	Holidaysburg, PA
Louis Sleber	halfback	1	5' 10"	165	1941	Sewickley Township H. S.	Herminie, PA
John Sylvester	halfback	0	5' 10"	148	1941	Bentleyville H. S.	Bentleyville, PA
Frank Scott*	equipment student manager				1939	Westinghouse, H. S.	Pittsburgh, PA
William McBride*	varsity student manager				1939	Central Catholic H. S.	Pittsburgh, PA
* Letterman

== Game summaries ==
=== West Virginia ===
Week 1: West Virginia at Pitt

Team	1	2	3	4	Total
West Virginia	0	0	0	0	0
• Pitt	0	6	7	6	19

- Date: September 24, 1938
- Location: Pitt Stadium
  Pittsburgh, PA
- Game start: 2:00 p.m.
- Game attendance: 34,500
- Game weather: sunny and warm
- Referee: W. H. Friesell* (Princeton)

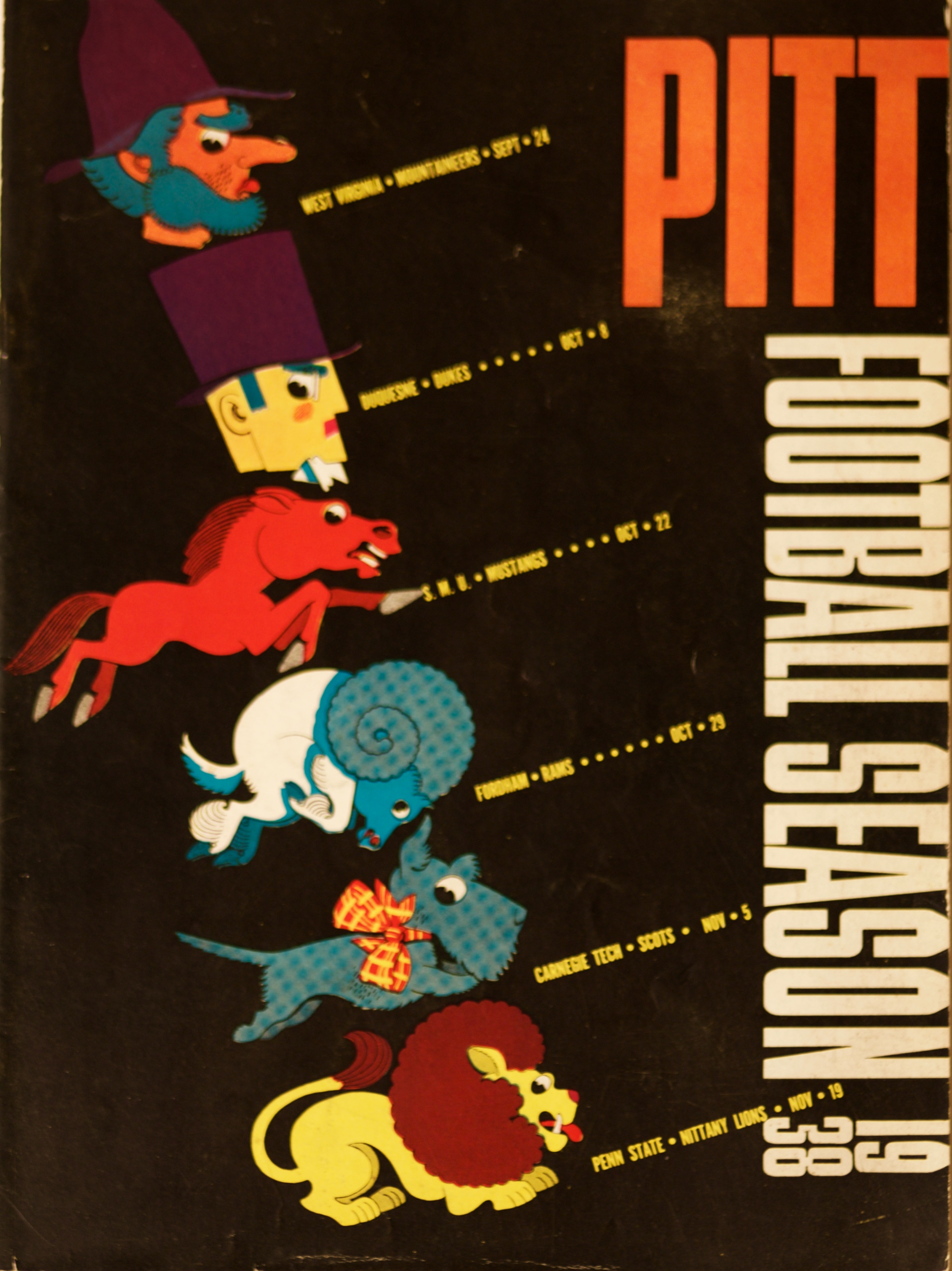
Program for September 24 game versus West Virginia

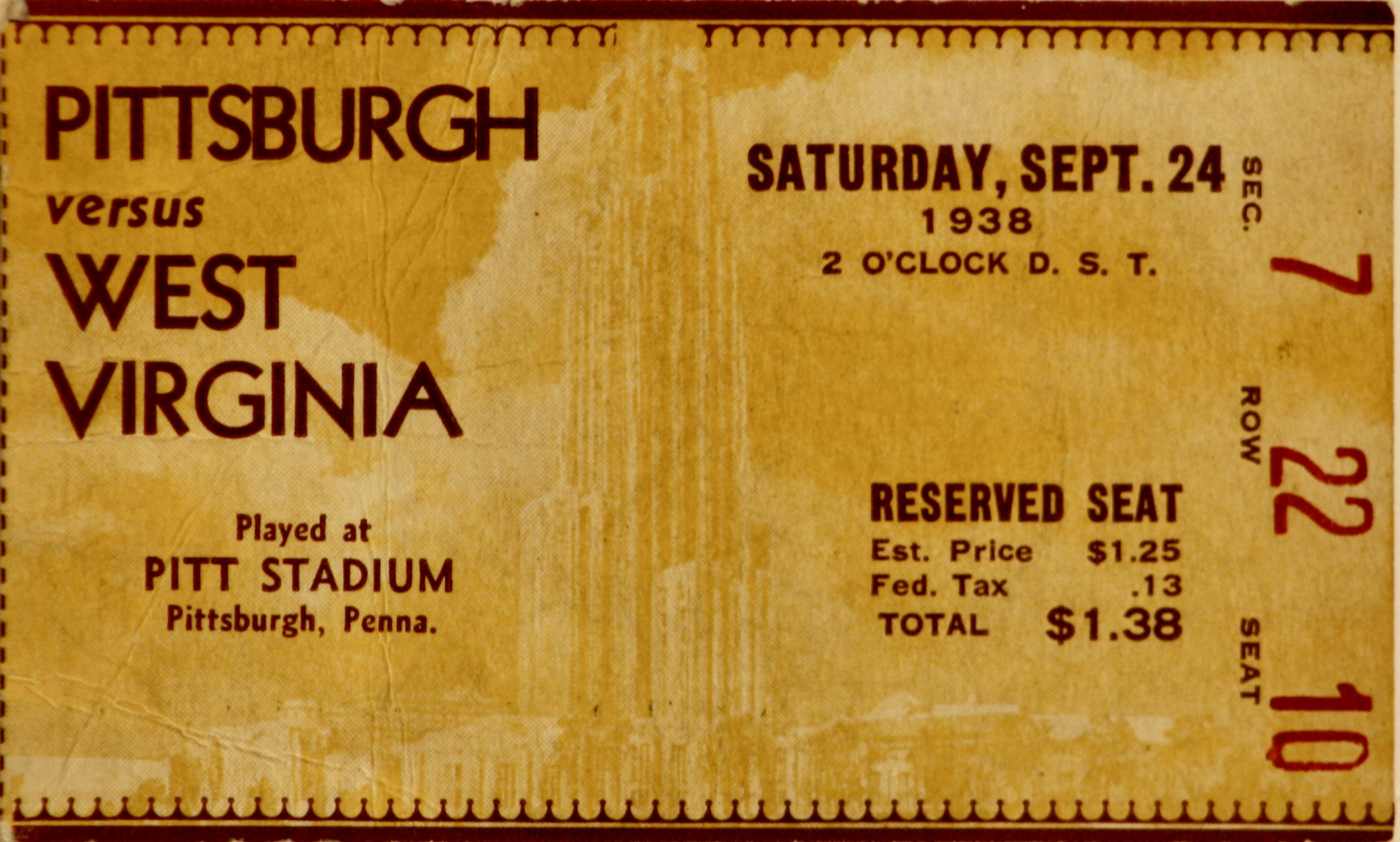
Ticket stub for West Virginia game

Second-year coach Marshall Glenn and his West Virginia Mountaineers were the opening game opponent. After posting an 8–1–1 record the previous season, including a Sun Bowl victory over Texas Tech, the Mountaineers were confident they could break their 9-year losing streak to the Panthers. The Mountaineers returned 8 members of their starting lineup from the Bowl game and had able reserves on the bench.

The Panthers led the all-time series 24–8–1 and had not lost to the Mountaineers since 1928. Coach Sutherland had to replace 6 starters from the previous season. His lineup had 10 seniors and one junior, but the reserve strength was worrisome because of the restrictions put in place for the previous 2 recruiting classes.

The Panthers continued their mastery over the Mountaineers with a solid 19–0 victory in front of an opening day record crowd of 34,500. The Panthers out-gained their opponent on the ground 329 to -11 and earned 15 first downs to 2 for the Mountaineers. West Virginia managed to complete 2 passes for 26 yards, but had three passes intercepted. Pitt drove deep into West Virginia territory twice in the first quarter and lost the ball on downs both times. The third drive followed a weak punt by the Mountaineers that gave Pitt the ball on the West Virginia 32-yard line. The eight-play drive ended with Marshall Goldberg going over left guard from the 2-yard line for the score. Bill Daddio's extra point attempt was blocked and Pitt led 6 to 0 at halftime. The Pitt offense sustained a 64-yard, 7-play drive in the third quarter, highlighted by a 33-yard dash by Stebbins that ended with Goldberg's 1-yard plunge for the touchdown. Daddio converted the placement and Pitt led 13 to 0. Sutherland substituted freely in the final quarter. The Pitt second string offense sustained a 9-play, 80-yard drive with Lawrence Peace, Robert Thurbon and Frank Goodell gaining yardage. Goodell fumbled going in from the 1-yard line, but Pitt end Joseph Rettinger caught the ball and scored. Lawrence Peace tried to run the ball in for the extra point, but was stopped short. Pitt 19 to West Virginia 0.

West Virginia coach Marshall Glenn heaped praise on the Panthers: "Say, that Pitt team is the best looking one I've seen in years. It has the stuff – a tight defense and a lot of power on offense....Yes, I'm very much afraid Jock has another one of his good teams this fall." The Mountaineers finished the season with 4–5–1 record.

The Pitt starting lineup for the game against West Virginia was Bill Daddio (left end), Elmer Mercovsky (left tackle), Albin Lezouski (left guard), Robert Dannies (center), Steve Petro (right guard), Walter Raskowski (right tackle), Fabian Hoffman (right end), John Chickerneo (quarterback), Dick Cassiano (left halfback), Harold Stebbins (right halfback) and Marshall Goldberg (fullback). Substitutes appearing in the game for Pitt were Joseph Rettinger, Thaddeus Konetsky, Ralph Hafer, Joseph Cambal, Gerald Lewis, Richard Fullerton, Harris Hawkins, Harold Klein, Rudolph Gradisek, Paul Foley, Arthur Corace, Albert Gurczenski, Ben Asavitch, Frank Kristofek, John Dickinson, Jack Goodridge, Charles Fleming, Ben Kish, Walter Fridley, Robert Thurbon, George Kracum, Lawrence Peace, Emil Narick, Ernest Bonnelli, Frank Goodell, Michael Sekela and Alvin Leber.

Scoring summary

Quarter	Time	Drive			Team	Scoring information	Score	
Quarter	Time	Plays	Yards	TOP	Team	Scoring information	West Virginia	Pittsburgh
2		8	32		Pittsburgh	Marshall Goldberg 2-yard touchdown run, Bill Daddio kick no good (blocked)	0	6
3		7	64		Pittsburgh	Marshall Goldberg 1-yard touchdown run, Bill Daddio kick good	0	13
4		9	80		Pittsburgh	Joseph Rettinger recovered Frank Goodell's fumble, Lawrence Peace failed on attempted run for the extra point	0	19
"TOP" = time of possession. For other American football terms, see Glossary of American football.							0	19

=== At Temple ===
Week 2: Pitt at Temple

Team	1	2	3	4	Total
• Pitt	14	0	7	7	28
Temple	0	0	0	6	6

- Date: October 1, 1938
- Location: Temple Stadium
  Philadelphia, PA
- Game start: 2:30 p.m.
- Game attendance: 41,728
- Game weather: fair and cool
- Referee: W. D. Maginnes (Lehigh)

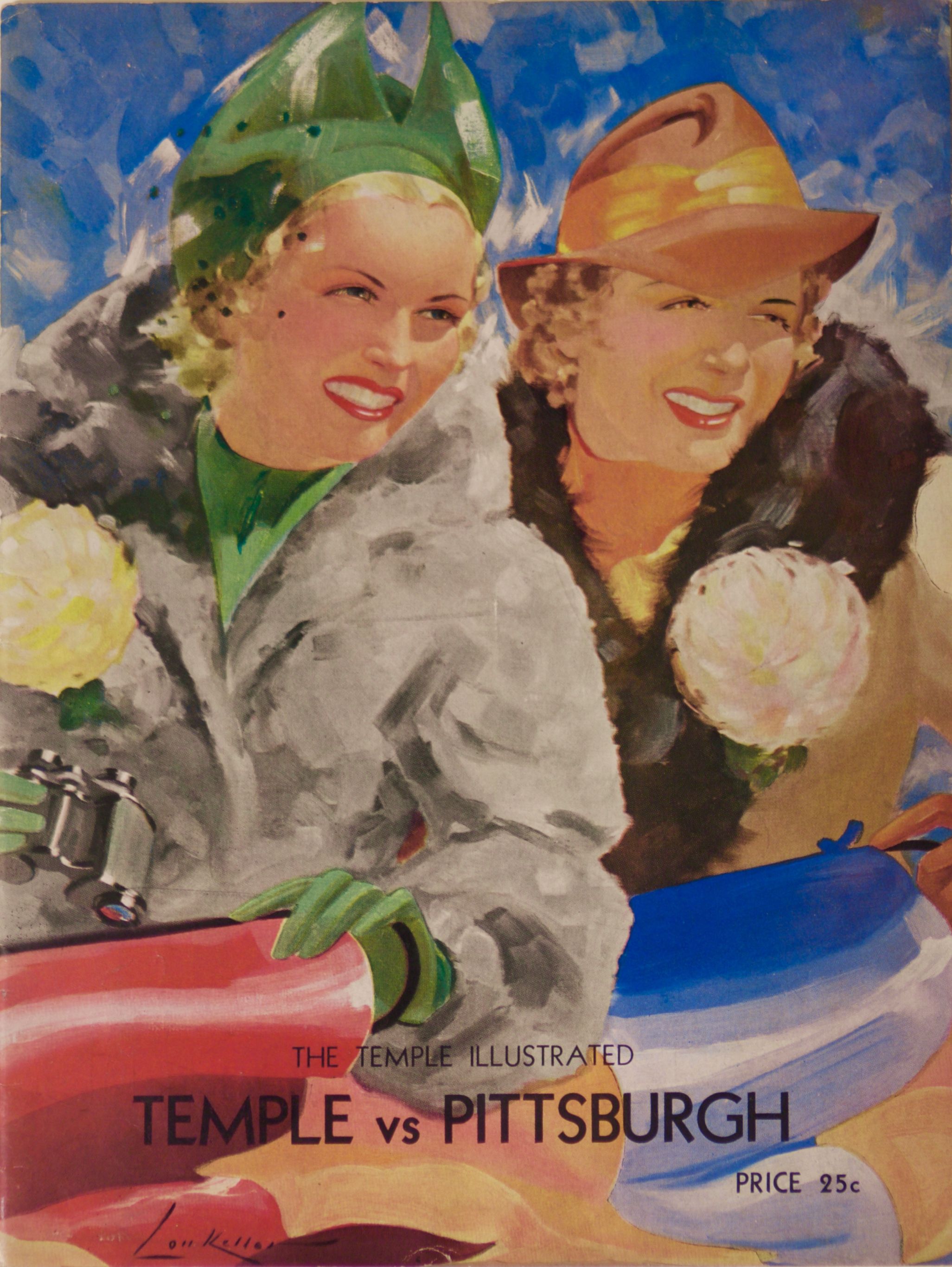
Program for October 1 game versus Temple

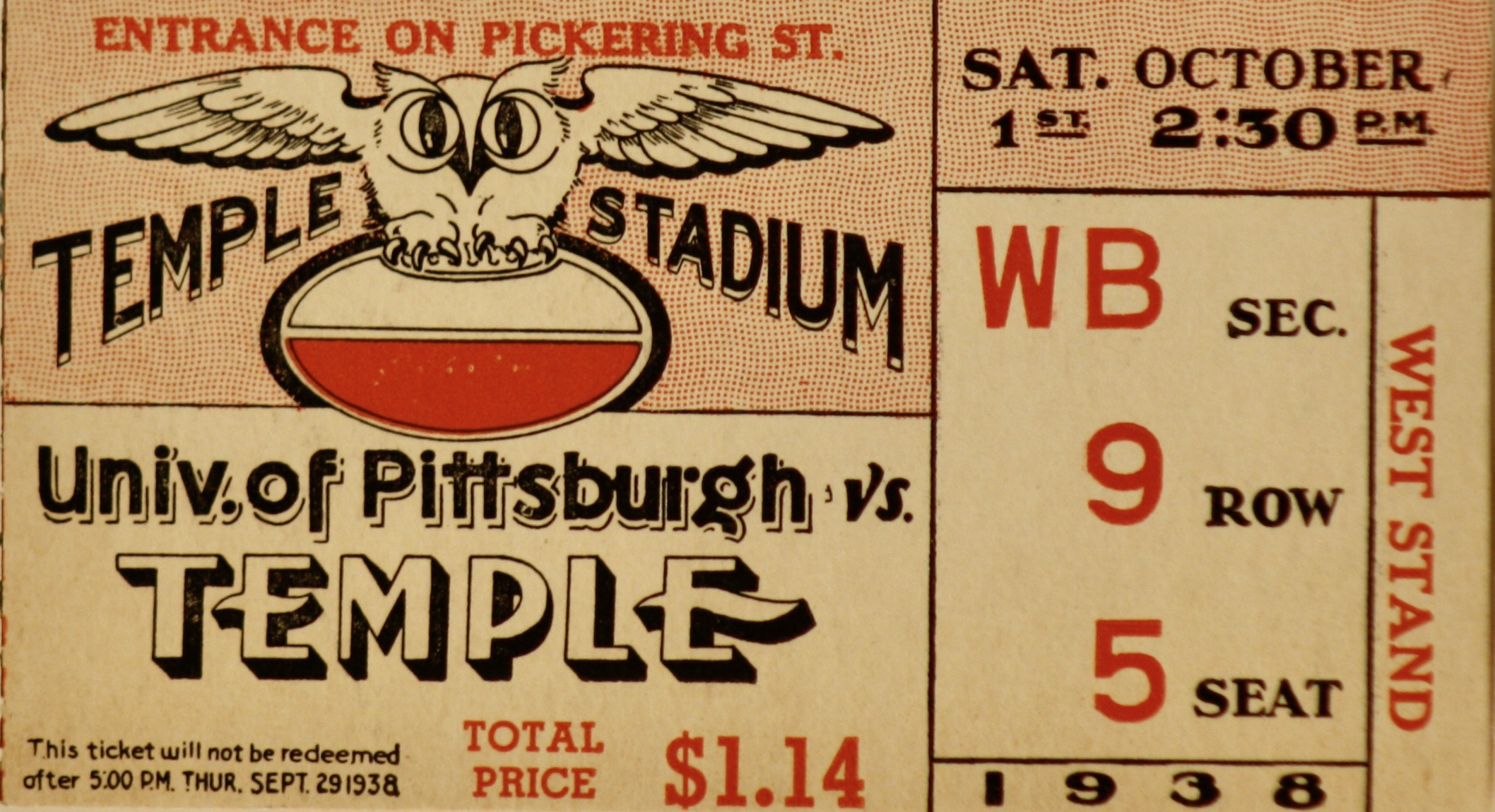
Ticket stub for the Temple game

For the October 1 game, the Panthers traveled across the state to Philadelphia to meet Glenn “Pop” Warner's Temple Owls. This was the first gridiron meeting between Temple and Pitt. On Friday morning, the Panthers' train arrived at 7:20 AM at the Broad Street Train Station. The squad of 33 was bused to the Manufacturer's Country Club in Oreland, PA. After lunch they practiced on the Temple Stadium turf. Sutherland used the same starting lineup that played in the West Virginia game.

Warner was in his 42nd and final season of coaching. The Owls opened their schedule with a 6–0 victory over Albright College. The friendly coaches had met six times before and their series was tied at 3–3.

In front of the largest crowd in Temple Stadium history (41,728), the Panthers tamed the Owls 28–6. The Pitt starters scored twice in the first quarter. Pitt blocked a punt and recovered on the Temple 29-yard line. On the sixth play, Dick Cassiano raced 10 yards around left end for the first score of the game. Bill Daddio converted the extra point and Pitt led 7–0. Minutes later the Panthers gained possession on their own 21-yard line and engineered a 15-play drive that ended with Cassiano sweeping left end from the 10-yard line for his second score of the game. Daddio was good with the placement and Pitt led 14–0. The second string played the entire scoreless second period. The first string offense reappeared in the third stanza and sustained a 14-play 63-yard drive. Marshall Goldberg plunged over from the 2-yard line and Daddio added the placement to up the score to 21–0. The Temple offense answered with a 7-play 60-yard drive of their own. The Owls threw 6 straight passes. The last toss from John Barrier to Michael Lukac covered the final 22 yards for Temple's only score of the day. George Honochick's extra point was blocked by John Dickinson and Joseph Rettinger. The second stringers played the final period. The Pitt defense blocked a punt and recovered on the Owl 19-yard line. On the fourth play Emil Narick raced 12 yards around right end for the final touchdown. Lawrence Peace converted the extra point and Jock Sutherland led Pop Warner 4–3 in head-to-head match-ups.

Surprisingly, the statistics were in Temple's favor. The Owls earned 14 first downs to Pitt's 12 and they gained a total of 278 yards (119 on the ground and 159 through the air on 14 of 18 pass completions), while the Panthers totaled 246 yards (all on the ground).

The Pittsburgh Sun-Telegraph noted that Dr. Sutherland said: 'I'm satisfied in every respect. The boys played a good, clean, hard game. Temple has a good team and will beat strong teams'." The Owls finished Warner's last season with a 3–6–1 record. The Panthers extended their unbeaten streak to 18 straight games with their victory over Temple.

The Pitt starting lineup for the game against Temple was Bill Daddio (left end), Elmer Merkovsky (left tackle), Albin Lezouski (left guard), Robert Dannies (center), Steve Petro (right guard), Walter Raskowski (right tackle), Fabian Hoffman (right end), John Chickerneo (quarterback), Dick Cassiano (left halfback), Harold Stebbins (right halfback) and Marshall Goldberg (fullback). Substitutes appearing in the game for Pitt were Joseph Rettinger, John Dickinson, John Goodridge, Albert Gurczenski, Thaddeus Konetsky, Frank Kristofek, Ralph Hafer, Rudolph Gradisek, Harold Klein, Harris Hawkins, Richard Fullerton, Michael Sekela, Robert Thurbon, Ben Kish, Alvin Leber, Emil Narick, Lawrence Peace, Ernest Bonnelli, George Kracum and Frank Goodell.

Scoring summary

Quarter	Time	Drive			Team	Scoring information	Score	
Quarter	Time	Plays	Yards	TOP	Team	Scoring information	Pittsburgh	Temple
1		6	29		Pittsburgh	Dick Cassiano 10-yard touchdown run, Bill Daddio kick good	7	0
1		15	79		Pittsburgh	Dick Cassiano 10-yard touchdown run, Bill Daddio kick good	14	0
3		14	63		Pittsburgh	Marshall Goldberg 2-yard touchdown run, Bill Daddio kick good	21	0
4		7	60		Temple	Michael Lukac 22-yard touchdown reception from John Barrier, George Honochick kick no good (blocked)	21	6
4		4	19		Pittsburgh	Emil Narick 12-yard touchdown run, Lawrence Peace kick good	28	6
"TOP" = time of possession. For other American football terms, see Glossary of American football.							28	6

=== Duquesne ===
Week 3: Duquesne at Pitt

Team	1	2	3	4	Total
Duquesne	0	0	0	0	0
• Pitt	14	0	7	6	27

- Date: October 8, 1937
- Location: Pitt Stadium
  Pittsburgh, PA
- Game start: 2:00 p.m.
- Game attendance: 37,000
- Game weather: sunshine and cool
- Referee: J. R. Trimble (Dubuque)

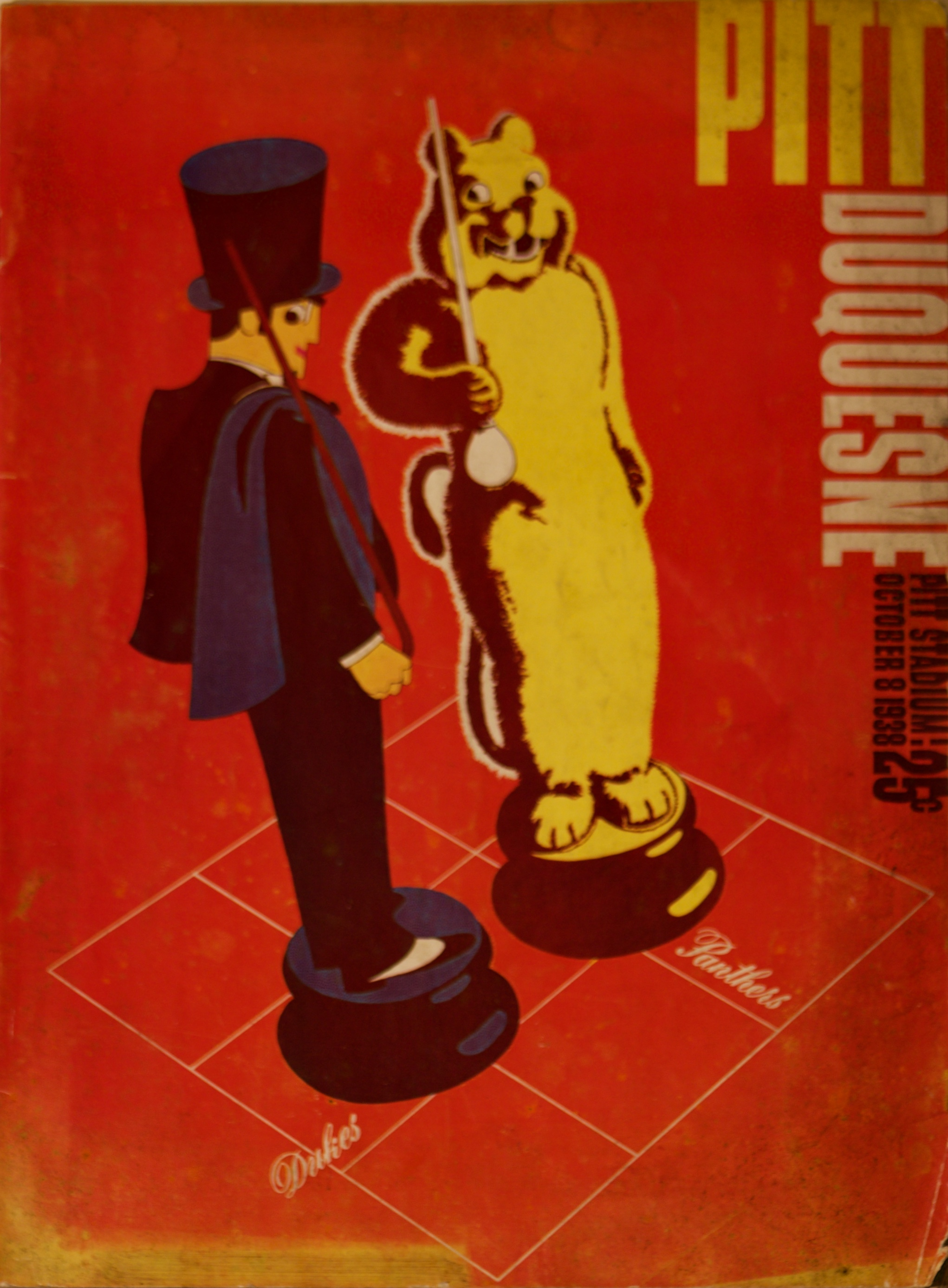
Program for October 8 game versus Duquesne

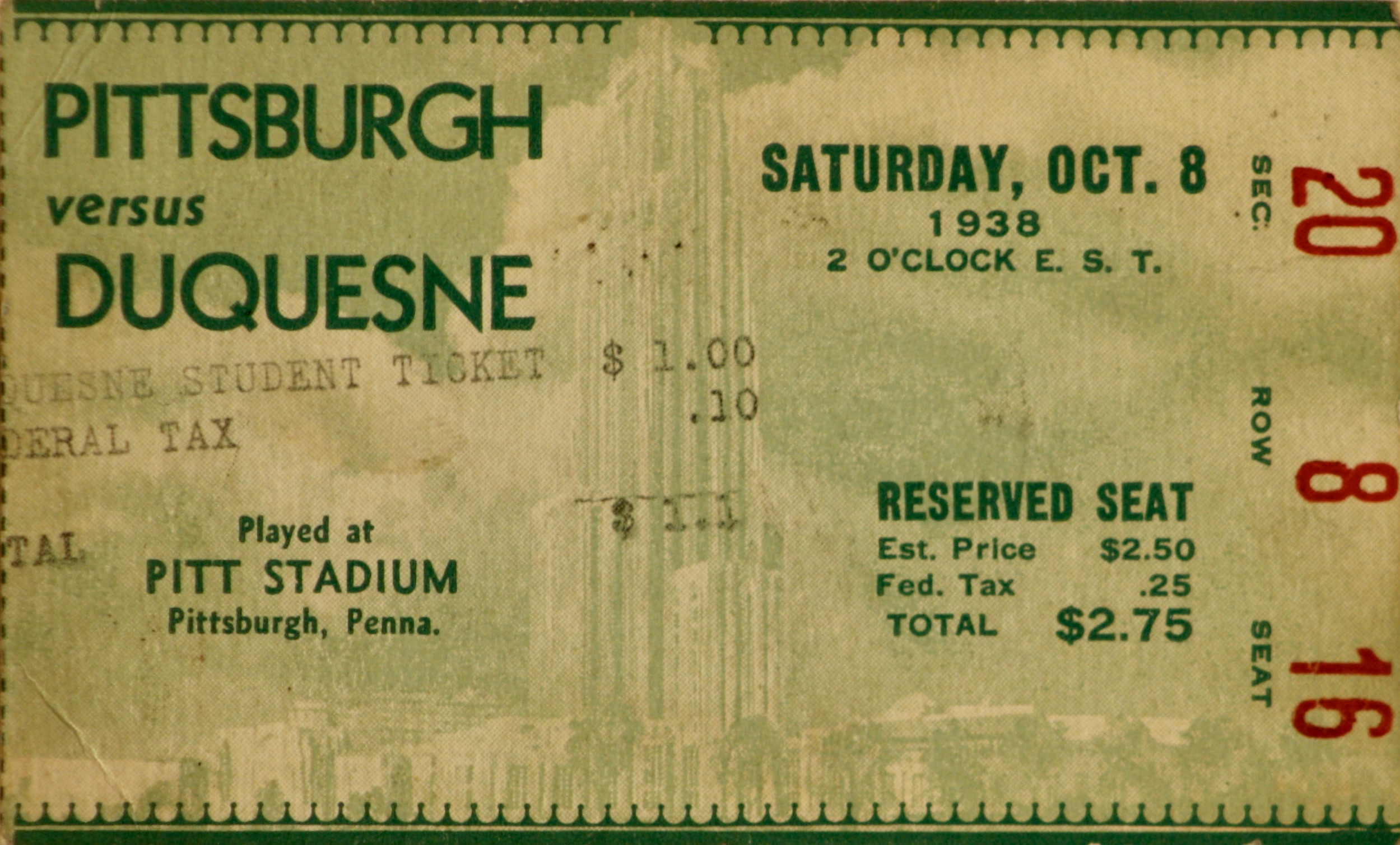
Ticket stub for the Duquesne game

On October 8, the undefeated Panthers met Duquesne for the first City Series match-up of the season. The Dukes, led by third-year coach John "Clipper" Smith, were 1–1 on the season. They beat Waynesburg (34–7) to open the season and then lost a close game to Texas Tech (7–6). Pitt led the all-time series with Duquesne 4–1. After the 1932 Pitt rout (33–0), only one touchdown was scored in each of the next three games. Pitt's last loss was to Duquesne (7–0) on October 17, 1936, and Coach Sutherland made sure that the Panthers would not be overconfident. He told the Sun-Telegraph: "Our boys are set. We have no alibis. If we lose to Duquesne we will lose to a better team."

The Panther offense ran and passed its way to a 27–0 decision over the out-manned Duquesne Dukes. Pitt earned 12 first downs to one for the Dukes, and out-gained them from scrimmage 259 yards to 5. Pitt kicked off and their defense forced a punt. The Panthers gained possession on the Dukes 41-yard line and seven plays later Dick Cassiano ran around right end from the 14-yard line for the touchdown. Bill Daddio's extra point was good and Pitt led 7–0. After an exchange of punts, the Panthers regained possession on their own 49-yard line. Five plays moved the ball to the 11-yard line. Marshall Goldberg completed the drive with a touchdown pass to Harold Stebbins and Daddio added the point after for a two-touchdown lead. The second quarter was scoreless. In the third period, Duke back Geno Onder fumbled and Pitt tackle Walter Raskowski recovered on the Duquesne 28-yard line. A six-play drive ended with Goldberg going through right tackle for the six-pointer and Daddio's conversion made it 21–0. The final touchdown was a 71-yard drive in the waning moments. The highlight was Cassiano's 46-yard reverse around end, which placed the ball on the six-yard line. On first down Goldberg's pass was caught by Daddio in the end zone. The extra point was wide.

Duquesne Coach Smith told the Sun-Telegraph: "They were too much for us, but we gave them a battle. The boys fought hard and well and the score would have been closer but for a few breaks that certainly didn't come our way. But we have no complaints, no alibis. The better team won. In fact, I might say a great team won, because Pitt is great." Duquesne finished the season with a 4–6 record.

The Pitt starting lineup for the game against Duquesne was Bill Daddio (left end), Elmer Merkovsky (left tackle), Albin Lezouski (left guard), Robert Dannies (center), Steve Petro (right guard), Walter Raskowski (right tackle), Fabian Hoffman (right end), John Chickerneo (quarterback), Dick Cassiano (left halfback), Harold Stebbins (right halfback) and Marshall Goldberg (fullback). Substitutes appearing in the game for Pitt were Joseph Rettinger, Thaddeus Konetsky, Rudolph Gradisek, Richard Fullerton, Harold Klein, Albert Gurczenski, Ralph Hafer, John Dickinson, John Goodridge, Ben Kish, Michael Sekela, Robert Thurbon, Emil Narick and Lawrence Peace.

Scoring summary

Quarter	Time	Drive			Team	Scoring information	Score	
Quarter	Time	Plays	Yards	TOP	Team	Scoring information	Duquesne	Pittsburgh
1		7	41		Pittsburgh	Dick Cassiano 14-yard touchdown run, Bill Daddio kick good	0	7
1		6	51		Pittsburgh	Harold Stebbins 11-yard touchdown reception from Marshall Goldberg, Bill Daddio kick good	0	14
3		6	28		Pittsburgh	Marshall Goldberg 2-yard touchdown run, Bill Daddio kick good	0	21
4		6	71		Pittsburgh	Bill Daddio 11-yard touchdown reception from Marshall Goldberg, Bill Daddio kick no good	0	27
"TOP" = time of possession. For other American football terms, see Glossary of American football.							0	27

=== At Wisconsin ===
Week 4: Pitt at Wisconsin

Team	1	2	3	4	Total
• Pitt	0	7	6	13	26
Wisconsin	0	0	0	6	6

- Date: October 15, 1938
- Location: Camp Randall Stadium
  Madison, WI
- Game start: 2:00 p.m.
- Game attendance: 26,197
- Game weather: wet, then sunny
- Referee: John Getchell (St. Thomas)

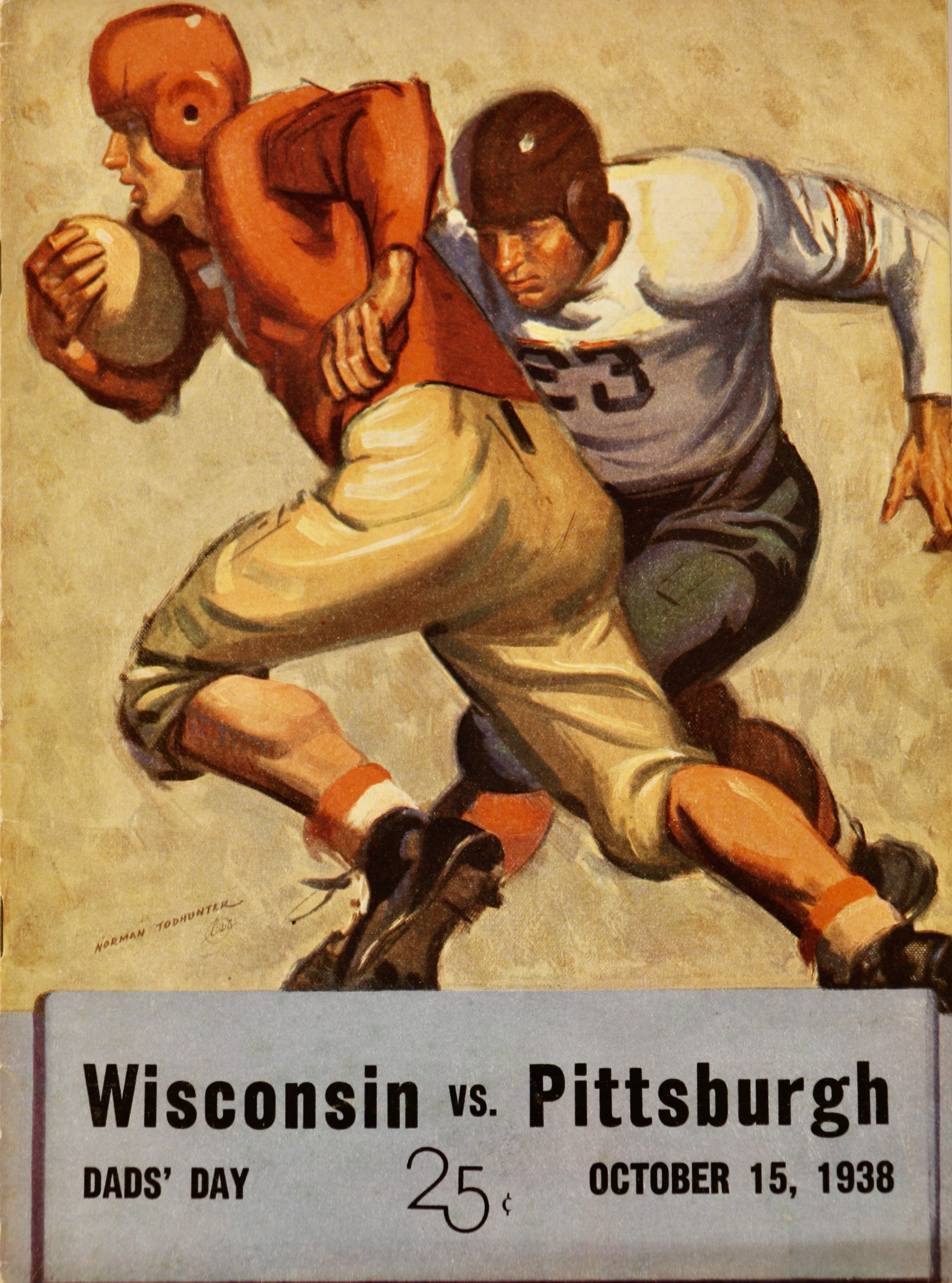
Program for October 15 game versus Wisconsin

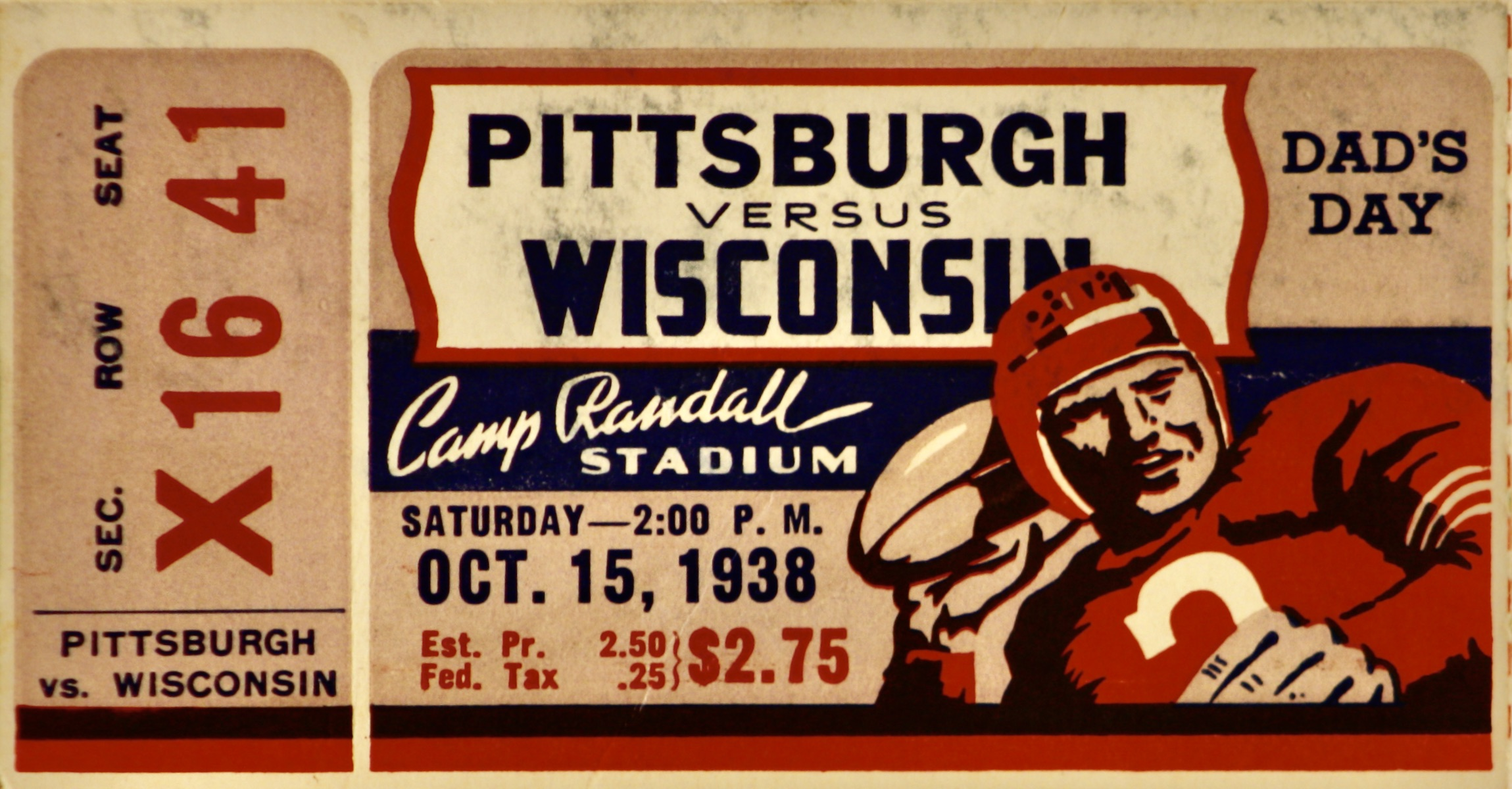
Ticket stub for the Wisconsin game

On October 15, the Panther squad traveled to Madison, WI to meet third-year coach Harry Stuhldreher's unbeaten Wisconsin Badgers. The Badgers beat Marquette (27–0) and Iowa (31–13) to open their season. Starting fullback Howard Weiss was named All-American on several teams and was awarded the Chicago Tribune Silver Football Award as the Big Ten's Most Valuable Player. One senior Badger told the Wisconsin State Journal: "It will be different this year, we won't be half beaten when we take the field here Saturday as we were last year.We know they're good, and we aim to show that we're a pretty good club too."

This was the Panthers first trip to Camp Randall Stadium. On Thursday evening, thirty-three players departed westward from Pittsburgh's Pennsylvania Train Station, and arrived in Janesville, WI on Friday morning. In the afternoon the squad worked out on a local field. Since their 1933 (7–3) loss to Minnesota in the fourth game of the season, the Panthers have been jinxed every year in the fourth game – 1934 (13–7) loss to Minnesota; 1935 (9–6) loss to Notre Dame; 1936 (7–0) loss to Duquesne and 1937 (0–0) tie with Fordham.

The Panthers put the voodoo to rest with a 26–6 victory. The first quarter was scoreless, but the Panthers managed to get on the scoreboard late in the half with a 61-yard drive ending with Marshall Goldberg's 2-yard touchdown plunge. Bill Daddio added the point after and Pitt led 7–0 at halftime. Early in the third quarter, Pitt guard Steve Petro intercepted Roy Bellin's pass and raced 9 yards for his first Pitt touchdown. Daddio missed the extra point. Pitt added two touchdowns in the final stanza. Dick Cassiano raced 71 yards for a touchdown on a fake punt. Daddio's placement was good, but Pitt was holding. The pass play from the 17-yard line failed. Pitt led 19–0. The Pitt defense forced a punt and Pitt gained possession on their 30-yard line. On first down, Emil Narick completed a 70-yard pass play to Robert Thurbon for Pitt's final touchdown. Lawrence Peace added the placement and Pitt led 26–0. With 16 seconds left in the game, the Badgers completed a 7-play 70-yard drive when John Tennant hit Gordon Gile with a 33-yard scoring pass. Karl Schuelke Jr. missed the placement. Pitt headed home unbeaten. Wisconsin finished their season with a 5–3 record.

The Pitt starting lineup for the game against Wisconsin was Bill Daddio (left end), Elmer Merkovsky (left tackle), Albin Lezouski (left guard), Robert Dannies (center), Steve Petro (right guard), Walter Raskowski (right tackle), Fabian Hoffman (right end), John Chickerneo (quarterback), Dick Cassiano (left halfback), Harold Stebbins (right halfback) and Marshall Goldberg (fullback). Substitutes appearing in the game for Pitt were Joseph Rettinger, Thaddeus Konetsky, Rudolph Gradisek, Richard Fullerton, Harold Klein, Albert Gurczenski, Ralph Hafer, John Dickinson, John Goodridge, Ben Kish, Michael Sekela, Robert Thurbon, Emil Narick, Lawrence Peace, Charles Fleming, Frank Kristufek, Gerald Lewis, Paul Foley, Harris Hawkins, Charles Shea, Ernest Bonnelli and Frank Goodell.

Scoring summary

Quarter	Time	Drive			Team	Scoring information	Score	
Quarter	Time	Plays	Yards	TOP	Team	Scoring information	Pittsburgh	Wisconsin
2		10	61		Pittsburgh	Marshall Goldberg 2-yard touchdown run, Bill Daddio kick good	7	0
3		1	9		Pittsburgh	Interception returned 9 yards for touchdown by Steve Petro, Bill Daddio kick no good	13	0
4		3	72		Pittsburgh	Dick Cassiano 71-yard touchdown run, 2-point pass incomplete	19	0
4		1	70		Pittsburgh	Robert Thurbon 70-yard touchdown reception from Emil Narick, Lawrence Peace kick good	26	0
4		7	70		Wisconsin	Gordon Gile 33-yard touchdown reception from John Tennant, Karl Schuelke, Jr. kick no good	26	6
"TOP" = time of possession. For other American football terms, see Glossary of American football.							26	6

=== SMU ===
Week 5: SMU at Pitt

Team	1	2	3	4	Total
SMU	0	7	0	0	7
• Pitt	7	13	7	7	34

- Date: October 22, 1938
- Location: Pitt Stadium
  Pittsburgh, PA
- Game start: 2:00 p.m.
- Game attendance: 37,500
- Game weather: sunny
- Referee: Harry Dayoff (Bucknell)

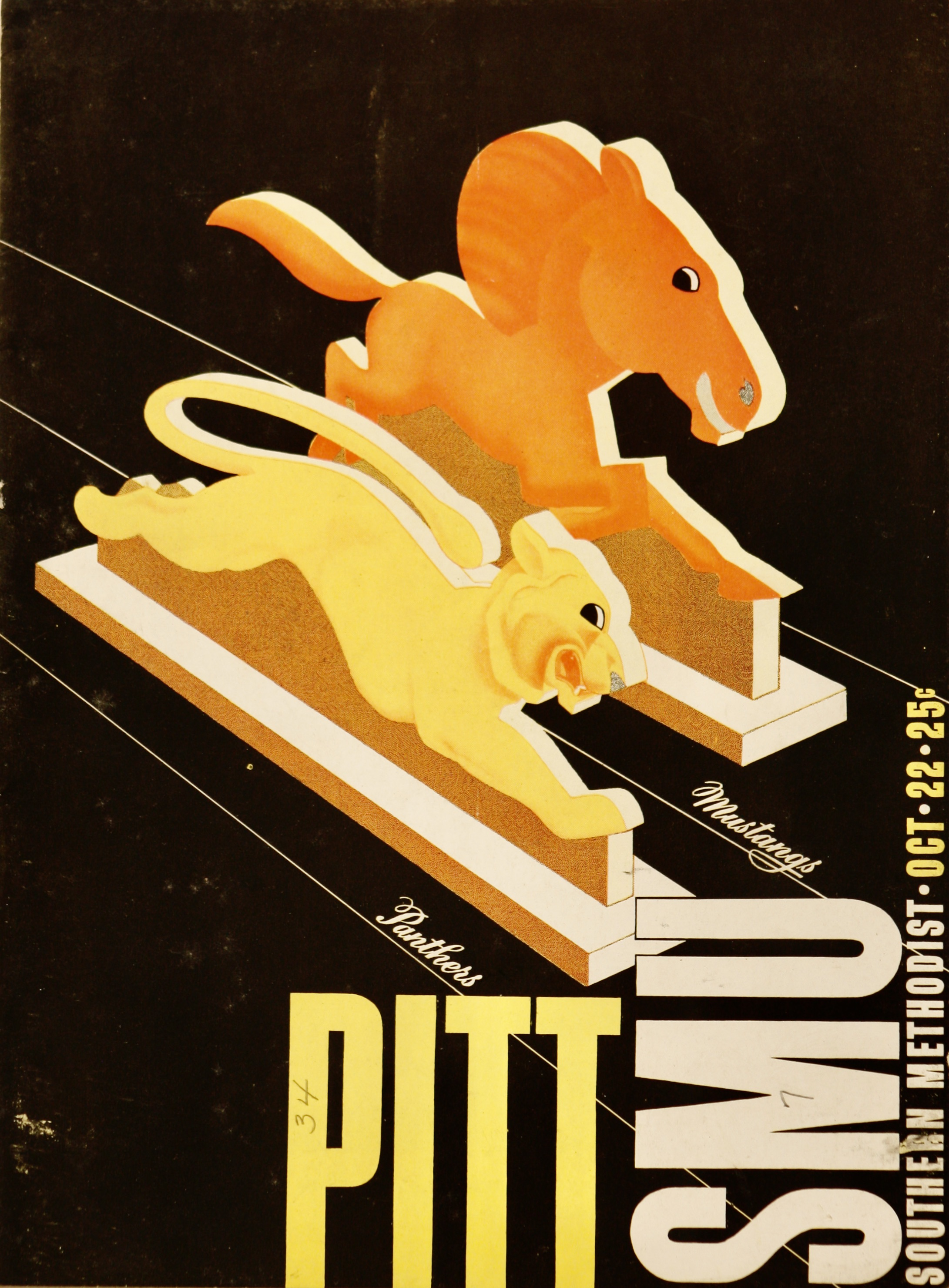
Program for October 22 game versus SMU

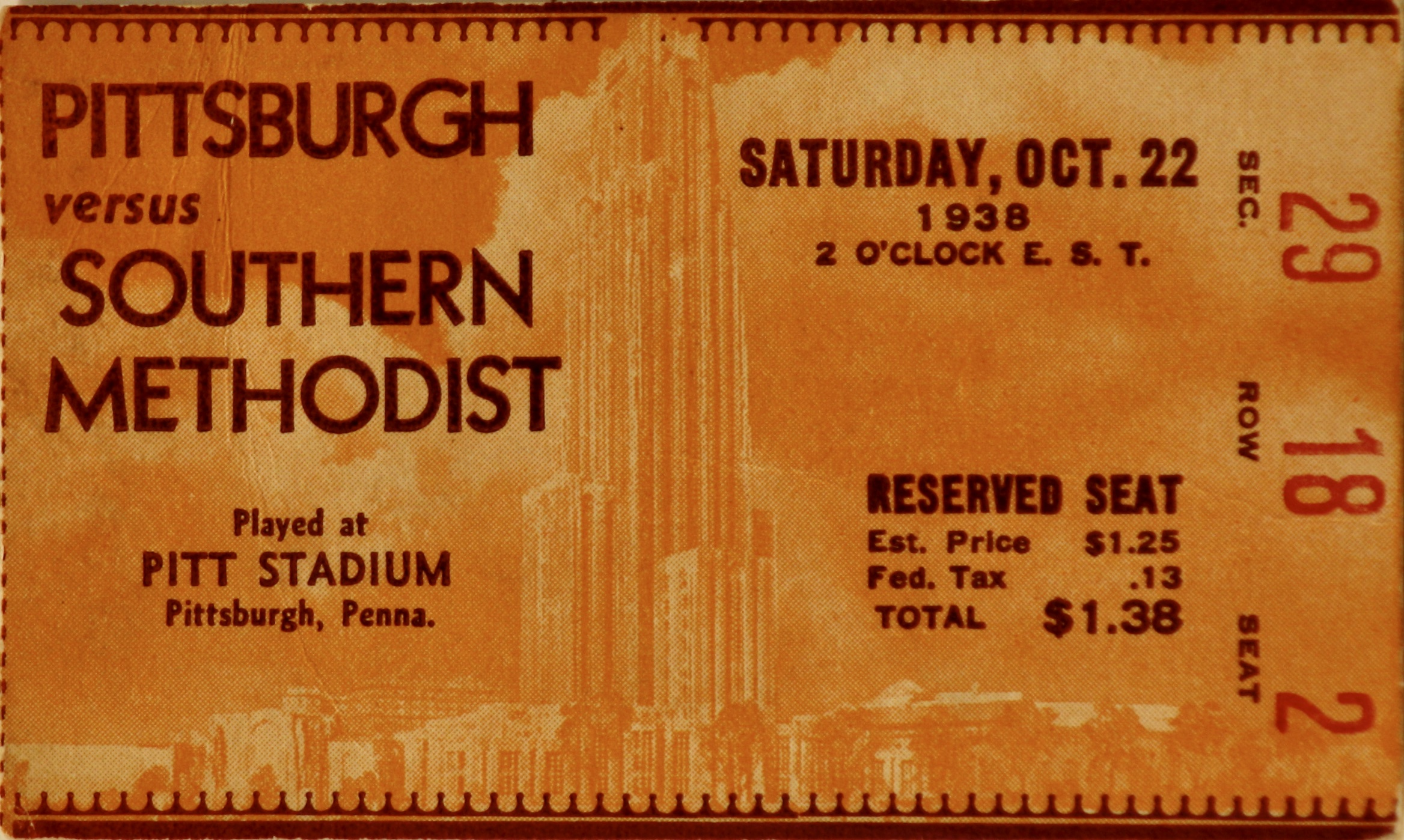
Ticket stub for the SMU game

On October 22, the SMU Mustangs, led by fourth-year coach Madison "Matty" Bell, made their first trip to Pitt Stadium. The Mustangs arrived with a 2–1 record. They beat North Texas State (34–7) and Arizona (29–7) at home and lost to Marquette(7–0) in Milwaukee. In Bell's first year (1935), the Mustangs went 12–0 in the regular season, but lost to Stanford (7–0) in the Rose Bowl. Coach Bell told the Sun-Telegraph: "Well, we're here. We're not promising to beat the best team in the country, but we'll give it the old college try, and, win or lose, Pitt will know it was in a football game. Can I promise any more?"

Coach Sutherland told Tom Hopkins of the Pittsburgh Sun-Telegraph: "Southern Methodist has a good team. It should have beaten Marquette, but fumbles down on the goal line wrecked the chances for touchdowns. This team has a diversified attack, is capable of good passing and has a fine running game. Our boys are in pretty fair shape for a hard game. The Southern Methodist game will be as tough as any that we have had to date." Sutherland used the same starting lineup for the fifth game in a row.

The Panthers remained undefeated with a convincing 34–7 drubbing of the Mustangs. The Panther offense scored the first time it gained possession, with a 55-yard drive that ended with a 30-yard touchdown pass from Harold Stebbins to John Chickerneo. Bill Daddio added the extra point and Pitt led 7–0. Sutherland replaced the starters at the beginning of the second quarter. Mustang back Gerald Guise intercepted an errant pass by Emil Narick and SMU had possession on their own 22-yard line. Two running plays moved the ball to midfield. On first down, Mustang right end, William Dewell, raced 50 yards around left end for the touchdown. Robert Belville tied the game with the placement. Sutherland put the first stringers back in the game. The Panthers responded behind the running of Dick Cassiano with two quick touchdowns and one extra point by Daddio to close the half leading 20–7. Early in the third period, Pitt center Robert Dannies intercepted a pass by Raymond Mallouf to give Pitt possession on the Mustang 29-yard line. On second down Dick Cassiano completed a 23-yard scoring pass to end Fabian Hoffman. Daddio converted the point after and Pitt led 27–7. The second team played the fourth quarter and added another Panther touchdown. The Panther offense advanced the ball to the Mustang 7-yard line and lost the ball on downs. The Mustangs fumbled and Pitt regained possession on the SMU 18-yard line. Ben Kish went through right guard from the 1-yard line for the score. Kish added the point and Pitt was still undefeated. The Mustangs finished their season with a 6–4 record.

The Pitt starting lineup for the game against Southern Methodist was Bill Daddio (left end), Elmer Merkovsky (left tackle), Albin Lezouski (left guard), Robert Dannies (center), Steve Petro (right guard), Walter Raskowski (right tackle), Fabian Hoffman (right end), John Chickerneo (quarterback), Dick Cassiano (left halfback), Harold Stebbins (right halfback) and Marshall Goldberg (fullback). Substitutes appearing in the game for Pitt were Joseph Rettinger, Thaddeus Konetsky, Ralph Hafer, Joseph Cambal, Gerald Lewis, Richard Fullerton, Harris Hawkins, Harold Klein, Rudolph Gradisek, Paul Foley, Albert Gurczenski, Ben Asavitch, Frank Kristufek, John Dickinson, Jack Goodridge, Charles Fleming, Ben Kish, Walter Fridley, Robert Thurbon, George Kracum, Lawrence Peace, Emil Narick, Ernest Bonnelli, Frank Goodell, Michael Sekela, Charles Shea, John Benz and Alvin Leber.

Scoring summary

Quarter	Time	Drive			Team	Scoring information	Score	
Quarter	Time	Plays	Yards	TOP	Team	Scoring information	Southern Methodist	Pittsburgh
1		9	55		Pittsburgh	John Chickerneo 30-yard touchdown reception from Harold Stebbins, Bill Daddio kick good	0	7
2		3	78		Southern Methodist	William Dewell 50-yard touchdown run, Robert Belville kick good	7	7
2		6	60		Pittsburgh	Dick Cassiano 2-yard touchdown run, Bill Daddio kick no good	7	13
2		6	31		Pittsburgh	Dick Cassiano 9-yard touchdown run, Bill Daddio kick good	7	20
3		2	29		Pittsburgh	Fabian Hoffman 23-yard touchdown reception from Dick Cassiano, Bill Daddio kick good	7	27
4		5	18		Pittsburgh	Ben Kish 1-yard touchdown run, Ben Kish kick good	7	34
"TOP" = time of possession. For other American football terms, see Glossary of American football.							7	34

=== Fordham ===
Week 6: Fordham at Pitt

Team	1	2	3	4	Total
Fordham	0	7	0	6	13
• Pitt	3	0	0	21	24

- Date: October 29, 1938
- Location: Pitt Stadium
  Pittsburgh, PA
- Game start: 2:00 p.m.
- Game attendance: 68,918
- Game weather: sunshine
- Referee: D. W. Very (Penn State)

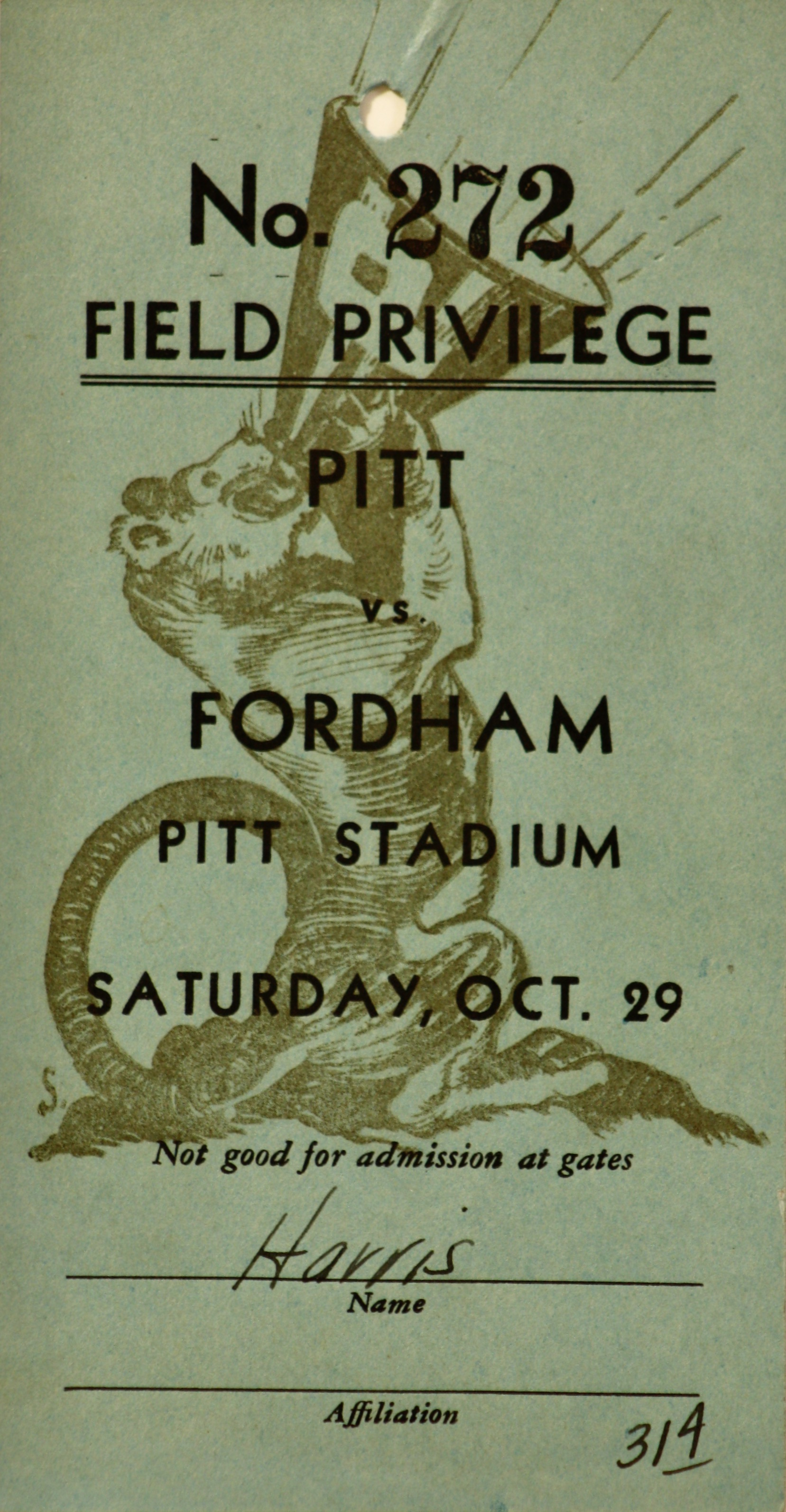
Field pass for October 29 game versus Fordham

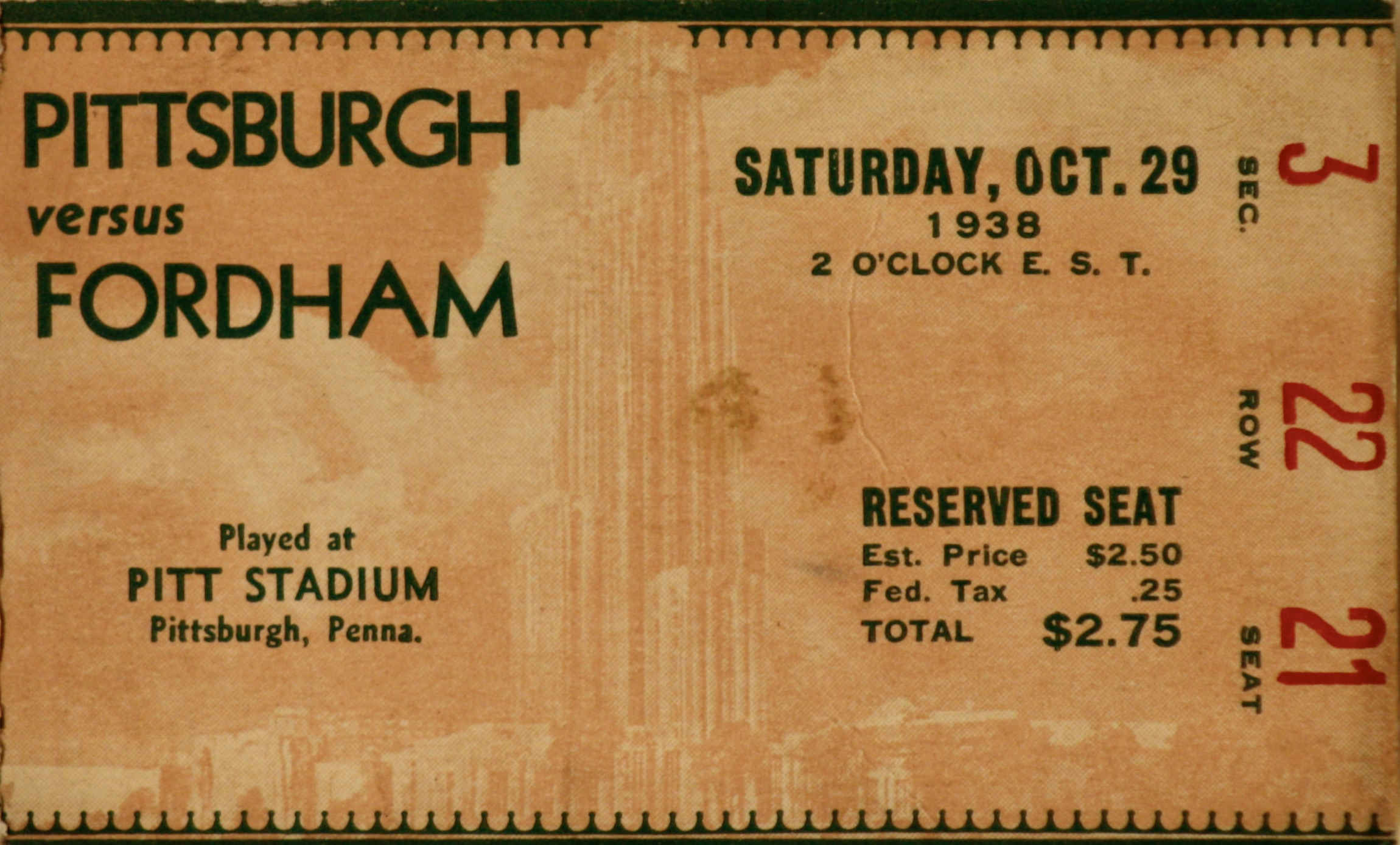
Ticket stub for the Fordham game

On October 29, the Fordham Rams, after playing three scoreless ties (1935, 1936 and 1937) against Pitt at New York's Polo Grounds, came west to Pitt Stadium for the fourth game of the series. Sixth-year coach Jim Crowley's Rams were 3–0–1 on the season and ranked #11 in the Associated Press weekly poll. The Rams beat Upsala (47–0) and Waynesburg (53–0) handily before tying Purdue (6–6), and beating Oregon (26–0). Coach Crowley mused: "I really expect there will be some scoring this time. Our problem is to be sure that we have a team composed of sure hard-hitting tacklers in the game. Pitt has the kind of backs which must be hit hard to be stopped. Shoddy tackling won't stop fellows like Goldberg, Stebbins, Cassiano and Chickerneo."

Coach Sutherland predicted: "This'll be a tough ball game, one of our toughest. Fordham no doubt is a better team than it was last year. This is chiefly because of the great versatility of the backfield. The line must be good to play the kind of ball it has played to date. However, we'll be in shape for them and we'll give them a battle. We have no alibis and are asking no sympathy." Ted Konetsky replaced Walter Raskowski at right tackle in the starting lineup.

73,400 tickets were sold. 2,400 employees, officials and media brought the advertised attendance to 75, 867. Myron Cope wrote an article for the 1978 Pitt Alumni News titled Kissing Your Sister In Front Of 43,000 Or 45,000 Or 50,000 Fans that Jim O'Brien reprinted in his book – Hail to Pitt. Mr.Cope claimed that Pitt's press agent, Frank Carver, admitted the actual attendance was 68,918.

The #1 Panthers rallied with three fourth quarter touchdowns to outscore the Fordham Rams 24–13 and remain unbeaten. Pitt end and place-kicker Bill Daddio broke the 3-plus year scoring drought with a first period 13-yard field goal. Fordham countered in the second quarter with a 55-yard scoring drive that was aided by a 15-yard penalty for unnecessary roughness against the Panthers. Michael Hearn scored the touchdown, and Wilbur Stanton added the point after to give Fordham a 7–3 lead at halftime. The third stanza was scoreless, but the Panther offense dominated the last period. Dick Cassiano's 9-yard touchdown run capped a 58-yard drive. Daddio added the point after and Pitt led 10–7. On the second play after the kick-off, the Panthers recovered a fumble by Mike Kochel on the Rams 24-yard line. Six plays later, Marshall Goldberg scored from the 3-yard line. Daddio added the point after. Fordham's offense gained one first down, but then Leonard Eshmont fumbled and Pitt recovered on the Rams 37-yard line. It took five plays for Goldberg to score his second touchdown of the day and Ted Konetsky capped the Pitt scoring with a successful placement. Fordham scored the final touchdown of the game on a 55-yard touchdown pass from Eshmont to Angelo Fortunato. Fortunato's extra point attempt was blocked and Pitt remained unbeaten 24–13. The Rams finished the season with a 6–1–2 record.

Coach Sutherland prophesied to Charles Doyle of the Sun-Telegraph: "I wish you would say for me that that was a very tough ball game today–but also say the game of next Saturday may be tougher."

The Pitt starting lineup for the game against Fordham was Bill Daddio (left end), Elmer Merkovsky (left tackle), Albin Lezouski (left guard), Robert Dannies (center), Steve Petro (right guard), Thaddeus Konetsky (right tackle), Fabian Hoffman (right end), John Chickerneo (quarterback), Dick Cassiano (left halfback), Harold Stebbins (right halfback) and Marshall Goldberg (fullback). Substitutes appearing in the game for Pitt were Joseph Rettinger, John Dickinson, John Goodridge, John Benz, Frank Kristufek, Harold Klein, Rudolph Gradisek, Richard Fullerton, Ben Kish, Lawrence Peace, Emil Narick, Robert Thurbon and Michael Sekela.

Scoring summary

Quarter	Time	Drive			Team	Scoring information	Score	
Quarter	Time	Plays	Yards	TOP	Team	Scoring information	Fordham	Pittsburgh
1		6	11		Pittsburgh	13-yard field goal by Bill Daddio	0	3
2		6	52		Fordham	Michael Hearn 1-yard touchdown run, Wilbur Stanton kick good	7	3
4		11	58		Pittsburgh	Dick Cassiano 9-yard touchdown run, Bill Daddio kick good	7	10
4		6	24		Pittsburgh	Marshall Goldberg 3-yard touchdown run, Bill Daddio kick good	7	17
4		5	37		Pittsburgh	Marshall Goldberg 2-yard touchdown run, Ted Konetsky kick good	7	24
4		5	90		Fordham	Angelo Fortunato 55-yard touchdown reception from Leonard Eshmont, Angelo Fortunato kick no good (blocked)	13	24
"TOP" = time of possession. For other American football terms, see Glossary of American football.							13	24

=== Carnegie Tech ===
Week 7: Carnegie Tech at Pitt

Team	1	2	3	4	Total
• Carnegie Tech	7	7	0	6	20
Pitt	10	0	0	0	10

- Date: November 6, 1938
- Location: Pitt Stadium
  Pittsburgh, PA
- Game start: 2:00 p.m.
- Game attendance: 61,000
- Game weather: sunshine
- Referee: W. H. Friesell (Princeton)

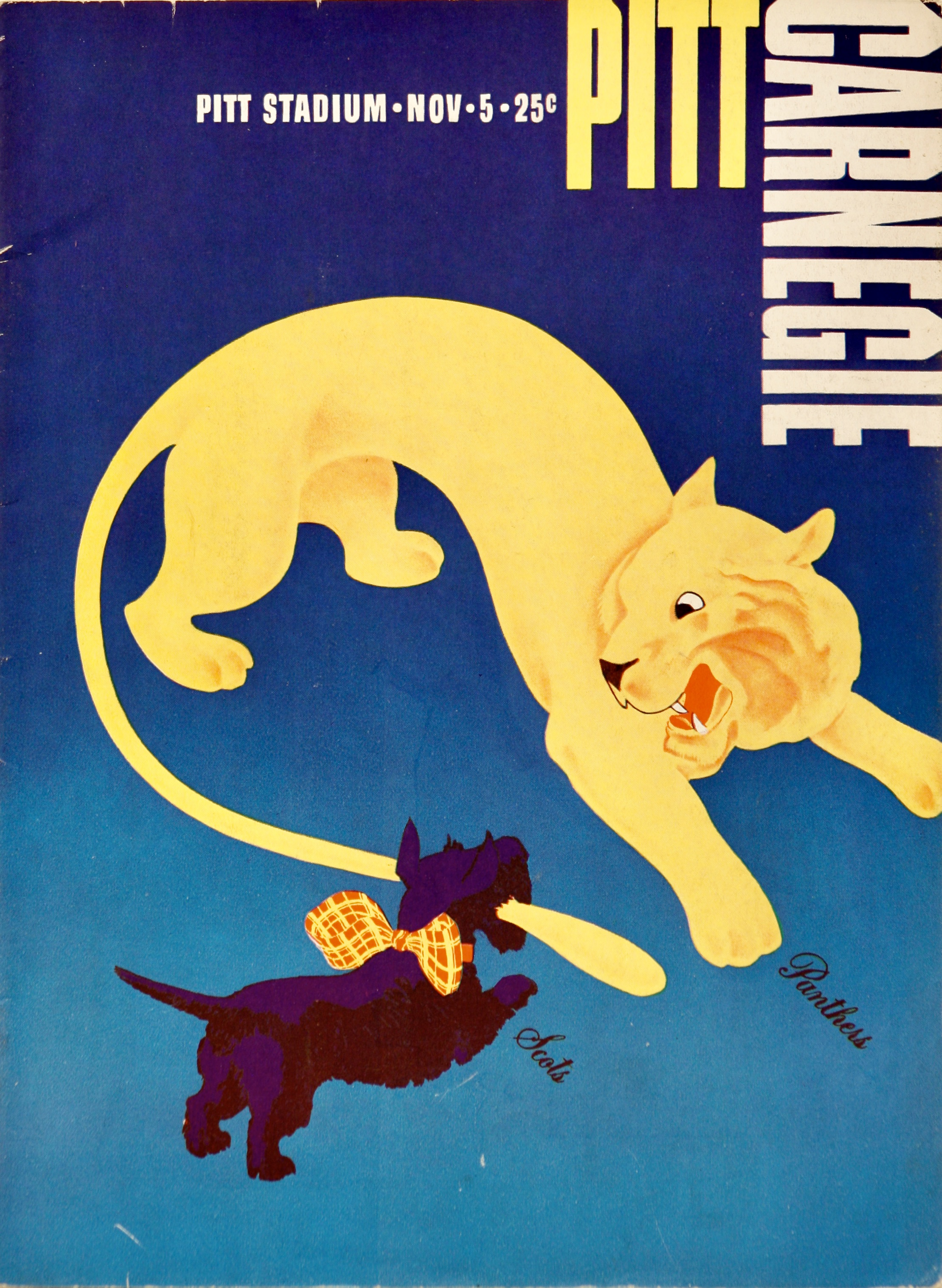
Program for November 5 game versus Carnegie Tech

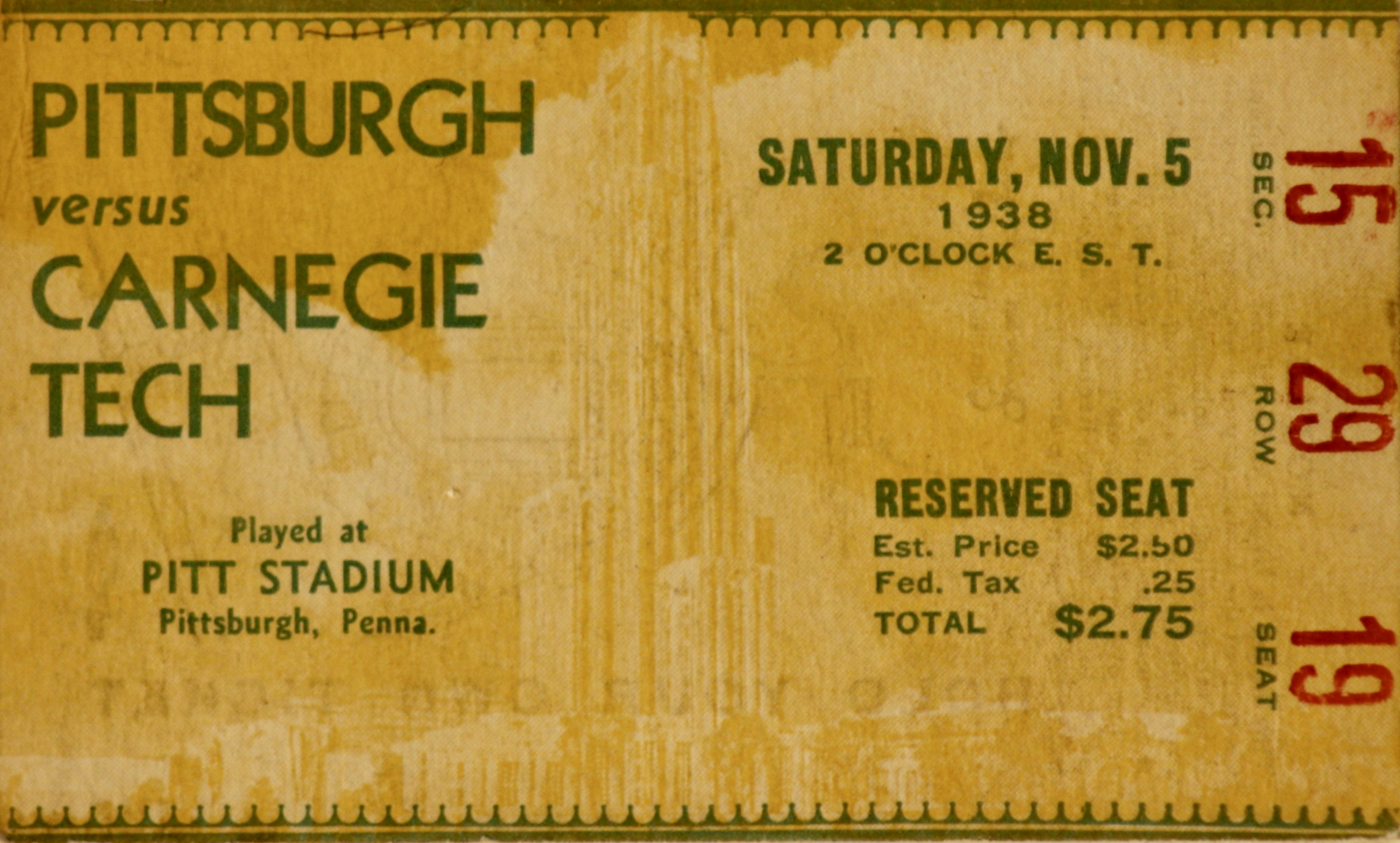
Ticket stub for the Carnegie Tech game

On November 6, the Carnegie Tech Tartans led by 2nd-year coach Bill Kern came to Pitt Stadium with a 4–1 record for the annual "City Game." Their only loss was at Notre Dame by a 7–0 score. The Panthers led the series 19–4–1, and Tech had not won since 1928. Tartan halfback Merl Condit received second team All-America mention by Irving Dix and third team mention by Paul Williamson. Coach Kern was pessimistic: "They're too strong for us. However, if our boys are up and Pitt is down we'll give them a battle, not enough of a battle to win but enough to hold the score down. I feel that our backs are almost as good as theirs but their big advantage lies in the line."

Coach Sutherland was worried: "Tech has us in a good spot for them. They'll be tremendously tough. The Tech team will be up for this game, while our boys will suffer a natural letdown from the hard Fordham game. I figure this game to be every bit as tough as Fordham. Our team is not at its best. We have a small squad and lack capable reserves." Pitt started the same lineup that faced Fordham. Marshall Goldberg twisted his knee in the Fordham game and Ben Kish was in reserve.

Pitt's 22-game win streak came to a halt as the Carnegie Tech Tartans overcame an early 7–0 deficit to beat the Panthers 20–10. To the pleasure of the Panther faithful, Pitt halfback Harold Stebbins raced 97 yards for a touchdown on the opening kick-off. Bill Daddio added the point after and Pitt led 7–0. Their elation was short-lived when, after exchanging punts, Marshall Goldberg left the game with an injury, and the Tartan offense went 47 yards in 6 plays, culminating with a 26-yard touchdown pass from George Muha to Ray Carnelly. Carnelly's placement tied the score. The Panther offense closed the first period with a 9-play, 53-yard drive that ended with a Daddio field goal from 12 yards. Pitt 10, Tech 7. Late in the second quarter, Tartan guard Bill Reith intercepted Stebbins pass at midfield and returned it to the Pitt 34-yard line. On third down, Ray Carnelly connected with Karl Striegel for a touchdown with 7 seconds remaining in the half. Carnelly's placement made the halftime score: Tech 14, Pitt 10. The third stanza was scoreless, but the Tartans drove to the Pitt 17-yard line before losing the ball on downs. Tech's final score was set up by a shanked punt by Pitt back Lawrence Peace that went out of bounds on the Panther 21-yard line. The 6-play drive ended with Muha plowing through the middle from the 1-yard line. Carnelly's placement was blocked by Peace and Tech won the City Game 20 to 10.

The Tartans finished the regular season 7–1 and were ranked #6 in the Associated Press poll. They were invited to the 1939 Sugar Bowl and lost 15–7 to the #1 ranked TCU Horned Frogs, who were led by Heisman Trophy winner Davey O'Brien.

The Pitt starting lineup for the game against Carnegie Tech was Bill Daddio (left end), Elmer Merkovsky (left tackle), Albin Lezouski (left guard), Robert Dannies (center), Steve Petro (right guard), Thaddeus Konetsky (right tackle), Fabian Hoffman (right end), John Chickerneo (quarterback), Dick Cassiano (left halfback), Harold Stebbins (right halfback) and Marshall Goldberg (fullback). Substitutes appearing in the game for Pitt were Joseph Rettinger, John Dickinson, John Goodridge, Walter Raskowsky, Frank Kristufek, Rudolph Gradisek, Harold Klein, Richard Fullerton, Lawrence Peace, Emil Narick, Robert Thurbon, Ben Kish and Michael Sekela.

Scoring summary

Quarter	Time	Drive			Team	Scoring information	Score	
Quarter	Time	Plays	Yards	TOP	Team	Scoring information	Carnegie Tech	Pittsburgh
1		1	97		Pittsburgh	Kickoff returned 97 yards for touchdown by Harold Stebbins, Bill Daddio kick good	0	7
1		6	47		Carnegie Tech	George Muha 26-yard touchdown reception from Merl Condit, Ray Carnelly kick good	7	7
1		9	53		Pittsburgh	12-yard field goal by Bill Daddio	7	10
2		3	34		Carnegie Tech	Karl Striegel 26-yard touchdown reception from Ray Carnelly, Ray Carnelly kick good	14	10
4		6	21		Carnegie Tech	George Muha 1-yard touchdown run, Ray Carnelly kick blocked	20	10
"TOP" = time of possession. For other American football terms, see Glossary of American football.							20	10

=== At Nebraska ===
Week 8: Pitt at Nebraska

Team	1	2	3	4	Total
• Pitt	0	6	6	7	19
Nebraska	0	0	0	0	0

- Date: November 12, 1938
- Location: Memorial Stadium
  Lincoln, NE
- Game start: 2:00 p.m.
- Game attendance: 35,000
- Game weather: crisp and sunny
- Referee: Frank Birch (Earlham)

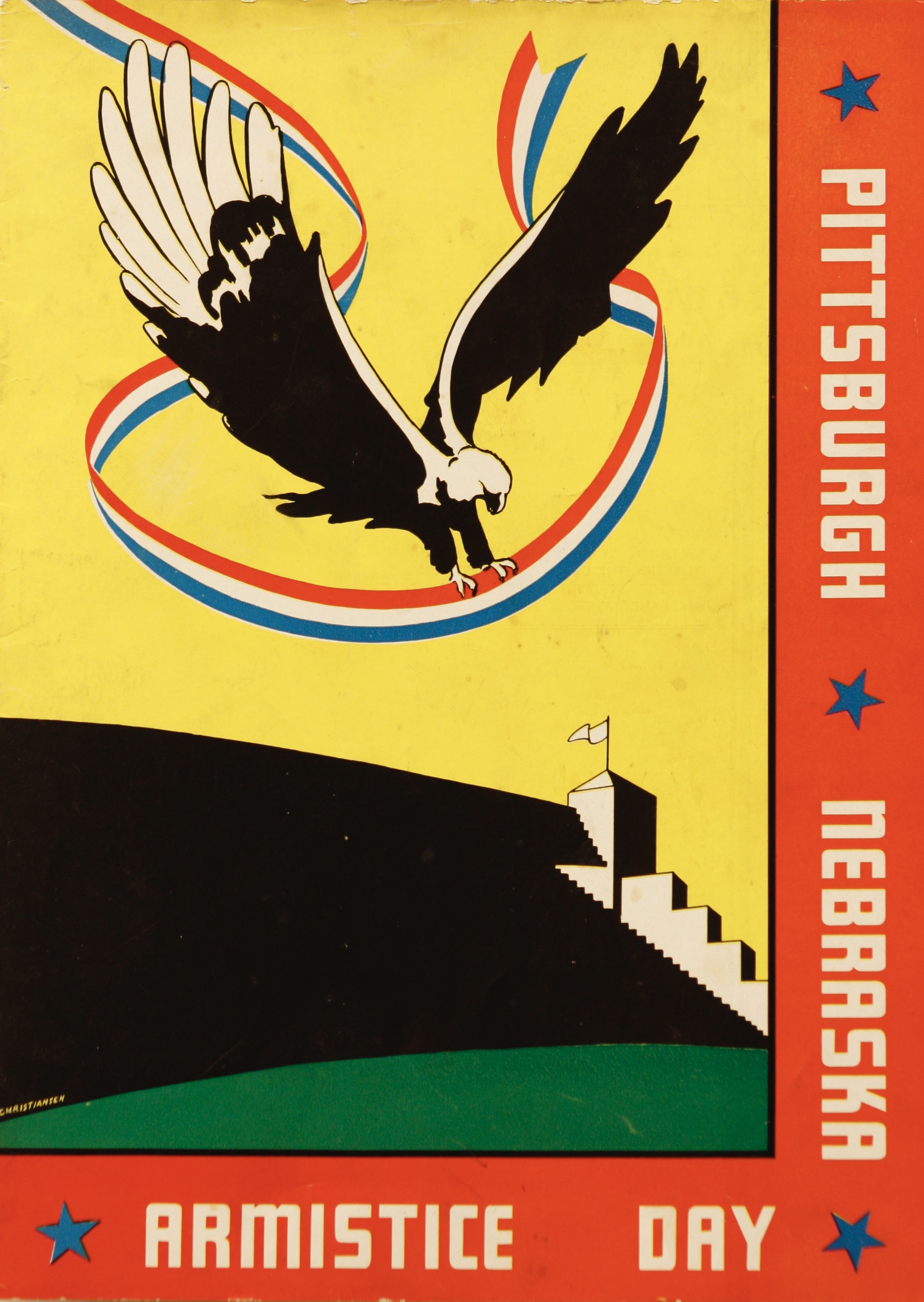
Program for November 12 game versus Nebraska

The Panthers went west to Lincoln, NE for their November 12 game against the Nebraska Cornhuskers. After posting a 6–1–2 record in his first season, coach Biff Jones's Huskers were only 1–4–1 in his second. Center Charles Brock was named first team All-American by Irving Dix and third team by NEA (Newspaper Enterprise Association).

The Panthers led the series 8–1–3. Nebraska won (10–0) the first meeting in Pittsburgh in 1921. Since the series was renewed in 1927, the Panthers have been in control. Coach Sutherland rested Marshall Goldberg, and Ted Konetsky started in place of Walter Raskowski at right tackle.

The favored Panthers got back in the win column with a 19–0 win over the Cornhuskers. The Panthers capitalized on two breaks. Early in the second quarter, Nebraska faked a punt deep in their own territory, but Husker back Bill Callihan fumbled, and Pitt center Dick Fullerton recovered on the Nebraska 10-yard line. On second down Dick Cassiano scored from 6 yards out. Bill Daddio's extra point went wide and Pitt led 6–0 at halftime. In the third period, Nebraska punter George Knight punted out of bounds on the Husker 27-yard line. The Panther offense took seven plays to add a 1-yard touchdown by Ben Kish to the scoreboard. Daddio's placement was blocked by Charles Brock. Daddio picked up the ball and attempted to score, but he was tackled inches short of the goal. Pitt's final score came on a 7-play, 69-yard drive. Cassiano scored from three yards out and Daddio converted the point after for the 19–0 final score. The Panthers dominated, earning 15 first downs and 270 net yards, against 4 first downs and 88 net yards for the Huskers. The Huskers finished the season with a 3–5–1 record.

Coach Jones stated: "Pitt had a fine team, a smart team and they were quick to cash in on the breaks. It's the same old story, you can't make any mistakes against the Panthers." Sutherland concurred: "It was a hard fought battle just as all Nebraska games have been in the past. We got two breaks that were converted into touchdowns. Brock, the Husker center, was the greatest player on the field."

The Pitt starting lineup for the game against Nebraska was Bill Daddio (left end), Elmer Merkovsky (left tackle), Albin Lezouski (left guard), Robert Dannies (center), Steve Petro (right guard), Thaddeus Konetsky (right tackle), Fabian Hoffman (right end), John Chickerneo (quarterback), Dick Cassiano (left halfback), Harold Stebbins (right halfback) and Lawrence Peace (fullback). Substitutes appearing in the game for Pitt were Joseph Rettinger, John Goodridge, Frank Kristufek, Rudolph Gradisek, Harold Klein, Richard Fullerton, Walter Raskowski, Lawrence Peace, Emil Narick, Robert Thurbon, Ben Kish and Michael Sekela.

Scoring summary

Quarter	Time	Drive			Team	Scoring information	Score	
Quarter	Time	Plays	Yards	TOP	Team	Scoring information	Pittsburgh	Nebraska
2		2	10		Pittsburgh	Dick Cassiano 6-yard touchdown run, Bill Daddio kick no good (wide)	6	0
3		7	27		Pittsburgh	Ben Kish 1-yard touchdown run, Bill Daddio kick no good (blocked)	12	0
4		7	69		Pittsburgh	Dick Cassiano 3-yard touchdown run, Bill Daddio kick good	19	0
"TOP" = time of possession. For other American football terms, see Glossary of American football.							19	0

=== Penn State ===
Week 9: Penn State at Pitt

Team	1	2	3	4	Total
Penn State	0	0	0	0	0
• Pitt	7	0	13	6	26

- Date: November 20, 1938
- Location: Pitt Stadium
  Pittsburgh, PA
- Game start: 2:00 p.m.
- Game attendance: 14,000
- Game weather: rain
- Referee: W. D. Maginnes (Lehigh)

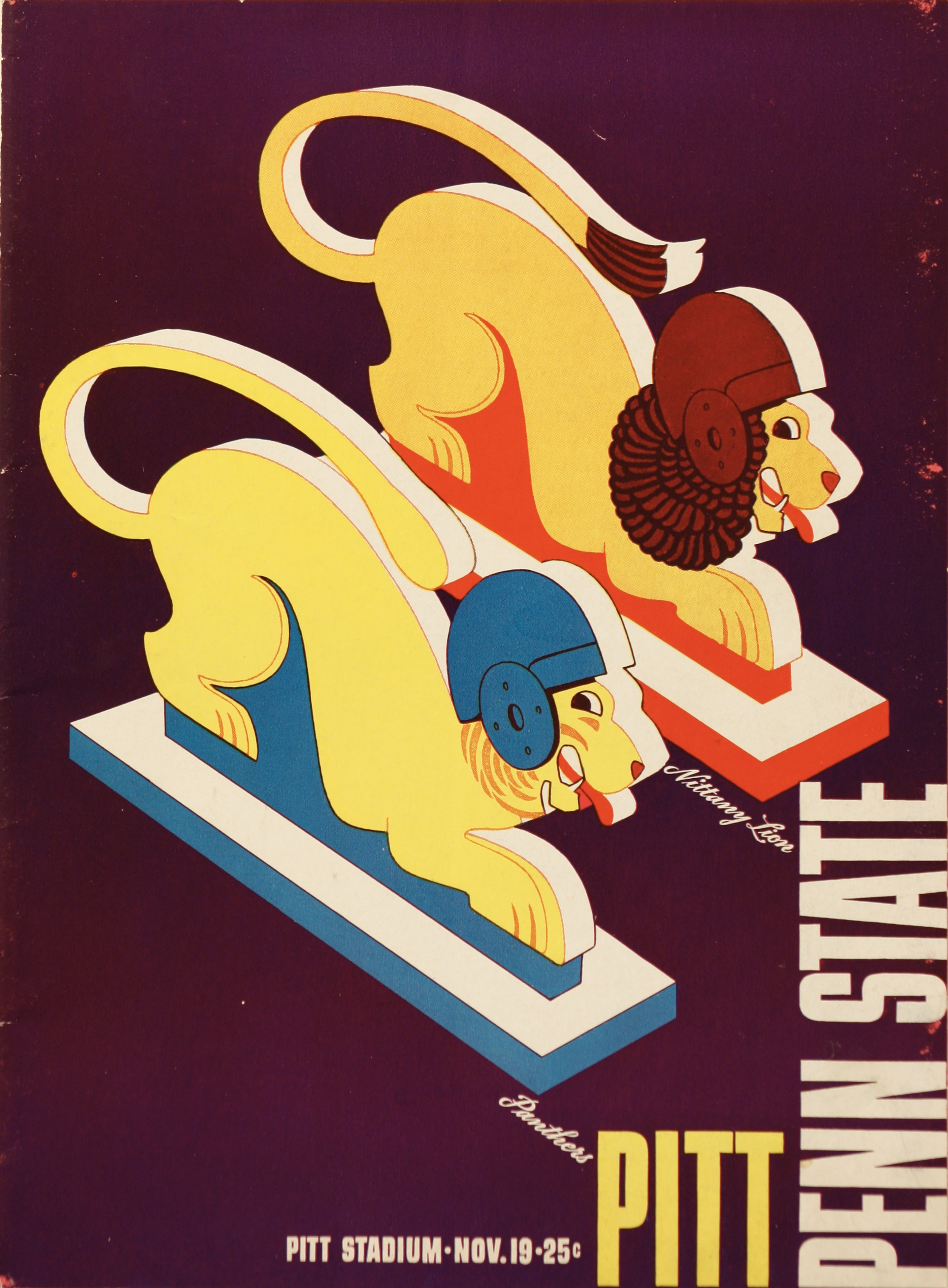
Program for the November 19 Penn State game

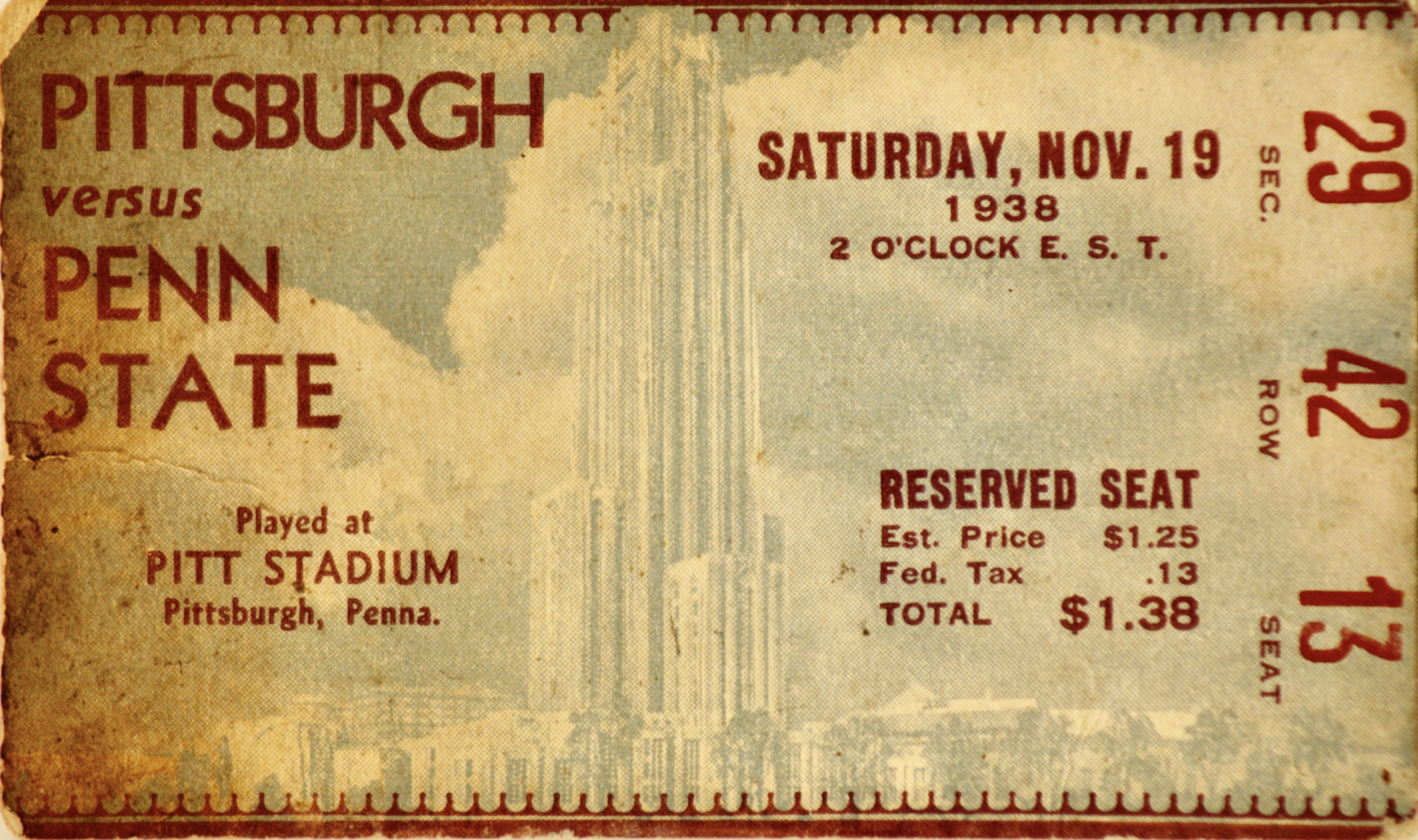
Ticket stub for Penn State game

While the Pitt Panthers varsity practiced for their annual game against the Nittany Lions, the Pittsburgh newspapers' sports writers were kept busy. The university had no dormitories or special training table for its athletes. The new Bowman Plan gave the athletes $48.00 per month for room, board and books. This sum was earned by working 2 hours per day, 7 days per week. In early November, the University Treasurer's Office sent the freshmen a bill for an additional $150.00 for tuition. The athletes had been led to believe that this note would not be collected. The Pitt freshmen football team protested and threatened to go on strike. The Administrative Office suggested that, after the season, the athletes work 5 hours per day to pay it off. The freshmen said no. After meeting with school officials, they were exempt from paying for the 1938–39 school year, but they would have to pay for their final three years.

Meanwhile, Penn State, under the tutelage of ninth-year coach Bob Higgins, arrived at Pitt Stadium with a record of 3–3–1. The Nittany Lions had not beaten Pitt since 1919, and Coach Sutherland had not lost to Penn State as a player or coach. Coach Higgins was pessimistic: "It's a cinch for Pitt. The Panthers have too much power and too much experience for our team."

Eighteen Pitt seniors suited up for their final home game appearance, in what turned out to be Jock Sutherland's final home game as coach of the Panthers. The seniors were Bill Daddio, Elmer Merkovsky, Walt Raskowski, Steve Petro, Al Lezouski, Robert Dannies, John Chickerneo, Harold Stebbins, Marshall Goldberg, Fabian Hoffman, Ben Asavitch, Charles Fleming, Charles Shea, Clement Cambal, Willard Curry, James Kosinski, Stephen Horton and Alfred Berger.

On a muddy, rain-soaked field, the Panthers led by Dick Cassiano's three touchdowns, extended their winning streak over the Nittany Lions to 16 games with a 26–0 shutout. In the opening period the Panthers scored on their second possession. Cassiano's first touchdown run of 15 yards came 3 plays after recovering a fumble on the State 46-yard line. Bill Daddio converted the extra point and Pitt led 7 to 0. The second stringers played a scoreless second quarter. Cassiano added two scores in the third period on runs of 19 yards and 28 yards. Daddio converted one of the placements and Pitt led 20 to 0 at the end of three quarters. The substitutes played the final quarter. Pitt recovered a fumble on the State 21-yard line. Robert Thurbon ran through right tackle from the 7-yard line for the final score. Lawrence Peace's placement was blocked.

The Pitt starting lineup for the game against Penn State was Bill Daddio (left end), Elmer Merkovsky (left tackle), Albin Lezouski (left guard), Robert Dannies (center), Steve Petro (right guard), Thaddeus Konetsky (right tackle), Fabian Hoffman (right end), John Chickerneo (quarterback), Dick Cassiano (left halfback), Harold Stebbins (right halfback) and Marshall Goldberg (fullback). Substitutes appearing in the game for Pitt were Joseph Rettinger, Stephen Horton, Leslie Holt, Ralph Hafer, Joseph Cambal, Gerald Lewis, Richard Fullerton, Harris Hawkins, Willard Curry, Harold Klein, Rudolph Gradisek, Paul Foley, Arthur Corace, Rudolph Gradisek, Gerald Lewis, Albert Gurczenski, Ben Asavitch, Frank Kristufek, John Dickinson, John Goodridge, Charles Fleming, Walter Raskowski, John Benz, James Kosinski, Clement Cambal, Ben Kish, Robert Thurbon, Charles Shea, George Kracum, Lawrence Peace, Emil Narick, Ernest Bonnelli, Frank Goodell, Michael Sekela and Louis Sleber.

Scoring summary

Quarter	Time	Drive			Team	Scoring information	Score	
Quarter	Time	Plays	Yards	TOP	Team	Scoring information	Penn State	Pittsburgh
1		4	47		Pittsburgh	Dick Cassiano 17-yard touchdown run, Bill Daddio kick good	0	7
3		6	56		Pittsburgh	Dick Cassiano 19-yard touchdown run, Bill Daddio kick good	0	14
3		2	33		Pittsburgh	Dick Cassiano 28-yard touchdown run, Bill Daddio kick no good	0	20
4		6	22		Pittsburgh	Robert Thurbon 6-yard touchdown run, Lawrence Peace kick blocked	0	26
"TOP" = time of possession. For other American football terms, see Glossary of American football.							0	26

=== At Duke ===
Week 10: Pitt at Duke

Team	1	2	3	4	Total
Pitt	0	0	0	0	0
• Duke	0	0	0	7	7

- Date: November 26, 1938
- Location: Duke Stadium
  Durham, NC
- Game start: 2:00 p.m.
- Game attendance: 52,000
- Game weather: snow
- Referee: Paul Magoffin (Michigan)

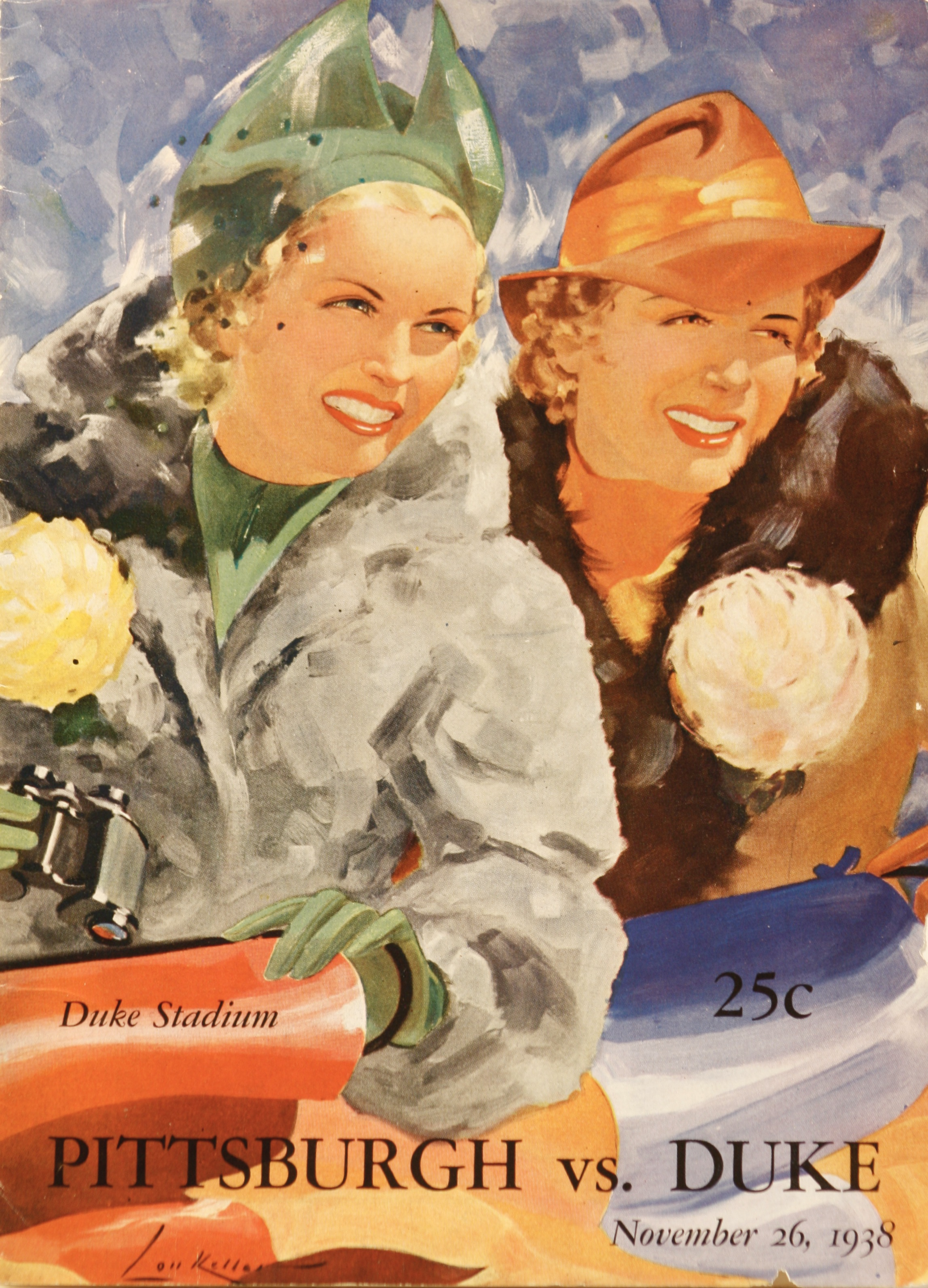
Program for November 26 game versus Duke

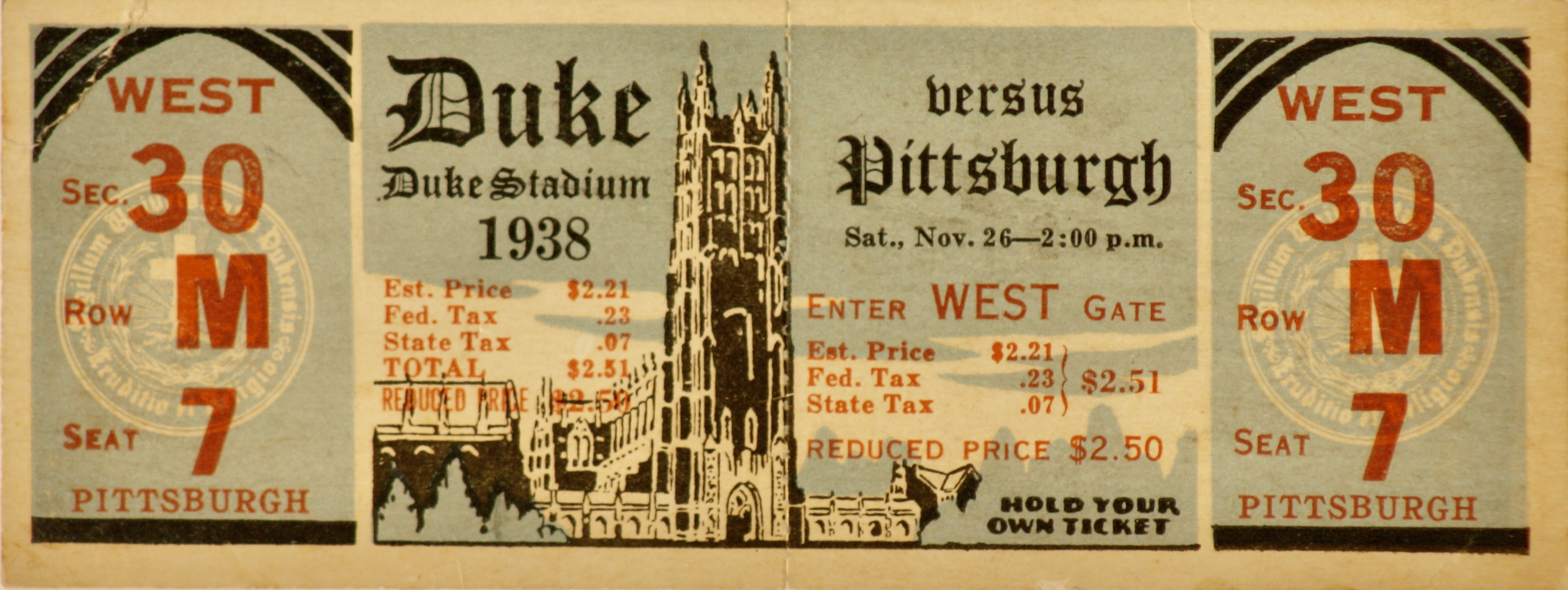
Ticket for the Duke game

In 1929, the Panthers inaugurated Duke Stadium by routing the Blue Devils 57–0. In 1937, the Panthers returned to beat Wallace Wade's Devils by a more respectable 10 to 0 margin. This season Duke was unbeaten, untied, and had outscored their opponents 107–0. Most of the Duke players from last year's game were back and aiming for a little revenge. All-America picks-center Dan Hill anchored the line, and halfback Eric Tipton led the offense.

Before the game, Sutherland was asked about the freshmen team controversy: "I don't care to comment. We have come a long way for this game. We are not in as good shape as we could be. I would be foolish to make a prediction. I hope we win. We have seniors playing their last game and it means a lot to them.You can be assured we will not lose easily."

Drew Middleton of The Atlanta Constitution wrote on Friday night for the Saturday morning edition: "The weather was clear and cool tonight, with every indication of a perfect football day tomorrow." Harry Scott in his book Jock Sutherland described it best: "Then came one of the queerest games in Pitt football history, in which the Oakland boys were literally and figuratively snowed under in a freak storm in Durham, North Carolina. It was the first time in forty-two years that snow had fallen there on November 26. And what a storm! Around nine o'clock in the morning a slight flurry began, and by game time the field was so blanketed with white that the chalk lines were invisible. All afternoon the steady snowfall continued and the players - along with the capacity crowd of spectators – became veritable snowmen."

In front of 52,000 spectators who braved the wretched weather, Duke remained unbeaten with a 7 to 0 victory. The Panthers came close to scoring twice. In the first quarter, the Panther offense drove 73 yards to the Duke 8-yard line but lost the ball on downs. In the second quarter, Pitt advanced the ball to the Duke 20, but fullback Lawrence Peace fumbled to end the drive. The second half was a punting duel and Duke halfback Eric Tipton kept the Panthers pinned deep in their own territory. Early in the final stanza, the Panthers attempted to punt from their end zone. End Willard Perdue blocked John Chickerneo's punt and recovered it in the end zone for a touchdown. Tony Ruffa added the extra point and Duke won 7–0. Statistics were deceiving as the Panthers made nine first downs and the Devils one. Pitt gained 156 yards and Duke mustered 81. The Blue Devils received the Rose Bowl bid and lost to Southern Cal 7 to 3.

The Pitt starting lineup for the game against Duke was Bill Daddio (left end), Elmer Merkovsky (left tackle), Harold Klein (left guard), Robert Dannies (center), Steve Petro (right guard), Thaddeus Konetsky (right tackle), Fabian Hoffman (right end), John Chickerneo (quarterback), Dick Cassiano (left halfback), Harold Stebbins (right halfback) and Marshall Goldberg (fullback). Substitutes appearing in the game for Pitt were John Goodridge, Walter Raskowski, Albin Lezouski, Rudolph Gradisek, Emil Narick and Lawrence Peace.

Scoring summary

Quarter	Time	Drive			Team	Scoring information	Score	
Quarter	Time	Plays	Yards	TOP	Team	Scoring information	Pittsburgh	Duke
4		1			Duke	Willard Perdue blocked a punt and recovered it in the end zone for a touchdown, Tony Ruffa kick good	0	7
"TOP" = time of possession. For other American football terms, see Glossary of American football.							0	7

== Individual scoring summary ==
1938 Pittsburgh Panthers scoring summary
Player	Touchdowns	Extra points	Field goals	Safety	Points
Dick Cassiano	11	0	0	0	66
Marshall Goldberg	7	0	0	0	42
Bill Daddio	1	17	2	0	29
Ben Kish	2	1	0	0	13
Harold Stebbins	2	0	0	0	12
John Chickerneo	2	0	0	0	12
Bob Thurbon	2	0	0	0	12
Emil Narick	1	0	0	0	6
Fabian Hoffman	1	0	0	0	6
Steve Petro	1	0	0	0	6
Joseph Rettinger	1	0	0	0	6
Lawrence Peace	0	2	0	0	2
Thaddeus Konetsky	0	1	0	0	1
Totals	31	21	2	0	213

== Postseason ==
The Panthers finished the season ranked #8 in the Associated Press Poll with an 8–2 record.

Marshall Goldberg finished second to Davey O'Brien in the Heisman Trophy voting (519 to 294).

On New Year's Day, six Panther footballers were in action. Bill Daddio, Harold Stebbins and Marshall Goldberg were chosen for the east squad by coach Andy Kerr to participate in the East-West Shrine game in San Francisco, California, while Steve Petro, John Chickerneo and Fabian Hoffman played for the North squad in the north–south game in Montgomery, Alabama.

== All-Americans ==
- **Marshall Goldberg** (halfback) - First team Newspaper Enterprise Association; First team United Press International; First team Associated Press; First team Collier's; First team Movietone News; First team Paramount News; First team Newsweek; First team New York Sun; First team World-Telegram; First team All-American Board; First team Walter Camp Football Foundation; First team Central Press Association; First team Irving Dix and Albert Richard; First team Life Magazine.
- Bill Daddio (end) - First team United Press; Second team Hearst Newspapers; Second team Life Magazine; Second team Central Press Association; Third team Associated Press; Third team Paul Williamson.
- Harold Stebbins (halfback) – Second team Hearst Newspapers.
- Albin Lezouski (guard) – Second team Central Press Association.
- Dick Cassiano (halfback) – Third team Central Press Association.

*Bold - Consensus All-American

== Team players drafted into the NFL ==
The following players were selected in the 1939 NFL draft.

Player	Position	Round	Pick	NFL club
Marshall Goldberg	Back	2	12	Chicago Cardinals
John Chickerneo	Back	3	25	New York Giants
Harold Stebbins	Back	4	27	Chicago Cardinals
Bill Daddio	End	5	31	Chicago Cardinals
Bob Dannies	Center	8	66	Chicago Bears
Steve Petro	Guard	9	72	Pittsburgh Pirates
Fabian Hoffman	End	13	112	Pittsburgh Pirates
Al Lezouski	Guard	16	141	Pittsburgh Pirates
