= Ev Fisher =

American football player (1914–1963)

Profile
- Positions: Fullback, end

Personal information
- Born: March 1, 1914; Napa, California, U.S.
- Died: December 16, 1963 (age 49); San Carlos, California, U.S.
- Listed height: 5 ft 11 in (1.80 m)
- Listed weight: 205 lb (93 kg)

Career information
- High school: Santa Rose (CA)
- College: Santa Clara

Career history
- Chicago Cardinals (1938-1939); Pittsburgh Steelers (1940)
- Stats at Pro Football Reference

Everett Earl "King" Fisher (March 1, 1914 – December 16, 1963) was an American football player.

A native of Napa, California, he attended Santa Rosa High School and played college football for Santa Clara. He played for the 1936 and 1937 Santa Clara Broncos football teams that compiled a combined record of 17–1, including victories in back to back Sugar Bowl games. He then played professional football in the National Football League (NFL) for the Chicago Cardinals in 1938 and 1939, and for the Pittsburgh Steelers in 1940. He appeared in 26 NFL games as a blocking back and end.

After his playing career ended, Fisher studied education at Redlands University and became a teacher. In 1943, he was hired as the coach of the Honolulu Bears in the Hawaii Senior Football League. He continued as head coach at Honolulu through the end of October 1943.

Fisher died in 1963 at age 47 of an apparent heart attack at his home in San Carlos, California.
