= Mike Kochel =

American football player (1916–1994)

No. 35
- Position: Guard

Personal information
- Born: March 6, 1916; Bloomfield, New Jersey, U.S.
- Died: September 18, 1994 (aged 78); Bellevue, Nebraska, U.S.
- Listed height: 5 ft 11 in (1.80 m)
- Listed weight: 195 lb (88 kg)

Career information
- High school: Bloomfield
- College: Fordham
- NFL draft: 1939: 19th round, 171st overall pick

Career history
- Chicago Cardinals (1939)

Career NFL statistics
- Games played: 8
- Games started: 3
- Stats at Pro Football Reference

Michael Joseph Kochel (March 6, 1916 – September 18, 1994) was a professional American football guard in the National Football League (NFL). He was drafted in the 19th round of the 1939 NFL Draft. He played one season for the Chicago Cardinals (1939).

One of the Seven Blocks of Granite for the Fordham Rams football team, Kochel was inducted into the school's hall of fame in 1975.
