= Frank Huffman =

American football player (1915–1980)

No. 49
- Positions: Tackle, end

Personal information
- Born: May 22, 1915; Pittsburgh, Pennsylvania, U.S.
- Died: September 16, 1980 (aged 65); Fayetteville, West Virginia, U.S.
- Listed height: 6 ft 1 in (1.85 m)
- Listed weight: 207 lb (94 kg)

Career information
- High school: Woodrow Wilson (Beckley, West Virginia)
- College: Marshall
- NFL draft: 1939: 18th round, 162nd overall pick

Career history
- Chicago Cardinals (1939–1941)

Career NFL statistics
- Games played: 28
- Games started: 8
- Stats at Pro Football Reference

Frank Huffman Jr. (May 22, 1915 – September 16, 1980) was an American professional football tackle and end.

Huffman was born in Pittsburgh in 1915. He attended Woodrow Wilson High School in Beckley, West Virginia. In May 1935, while working on a highway construction project, Huffman suffered a broken back when he was caught under the descending apron of a concrete mixer.

Huffman played college football for the Marshall Thundering Herd from 1936 to 1938. Huffman received first-team honors on the 1936 and 1937 All-West Virginia Collegiate Conference football teams. He also handled kicking for Marshall, tallying 19 points after touchdown in 1938.

Huffman was drafted by the Chicago Cardinals in the 18th round (162nd overall pick) of the 1939 NFL draft. He appeared in 28 games for the Cardinals during the 1939, 1940, and 1941 seasons. He played on both offense and defense as a guard, tackle, center, and linebacker.

Huffman died from a heart attack in 1980 in Fayetteville, West Virginia.
