= Ted Bank =

American college football player (1897–1986)

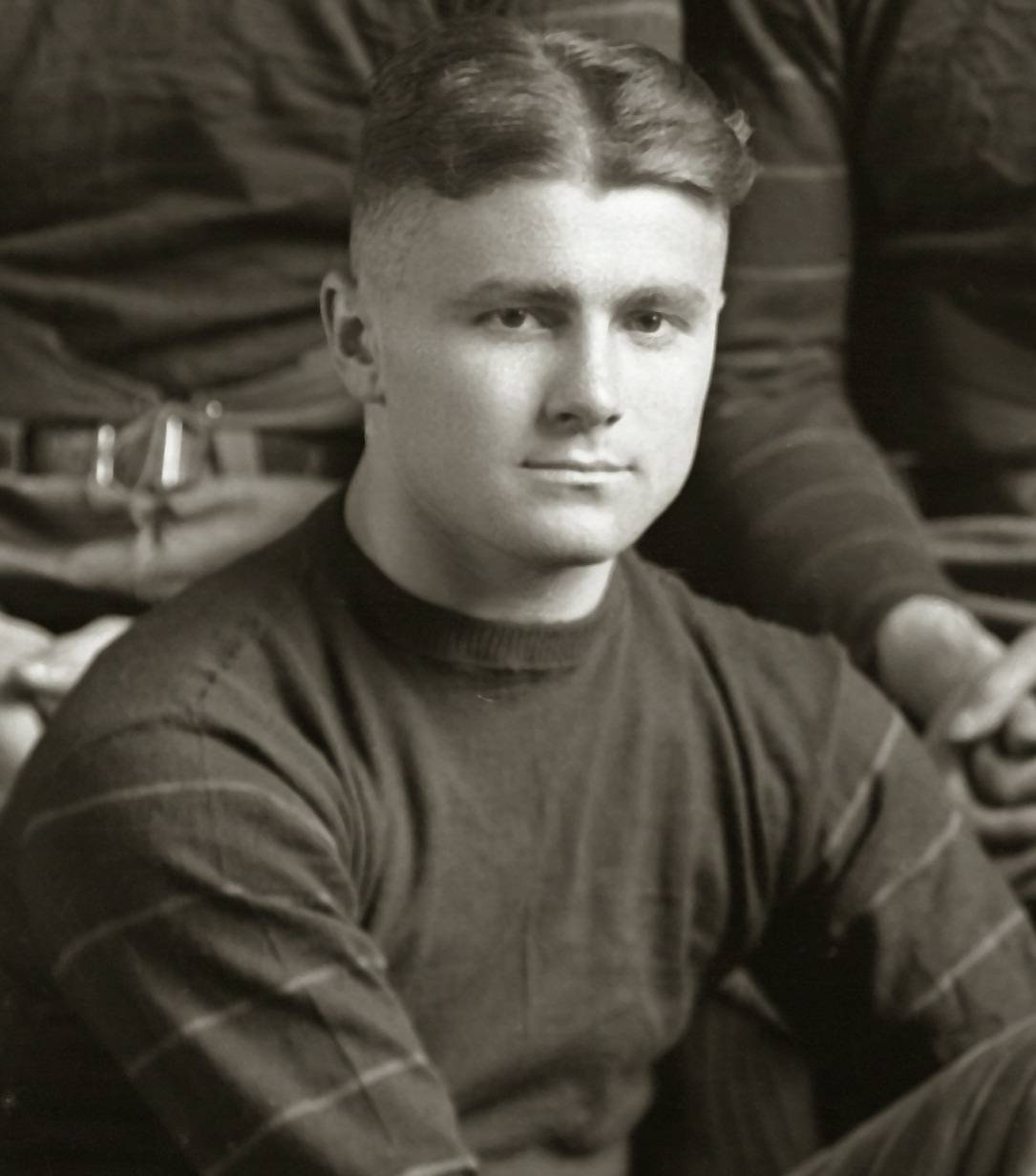
- 1920 Michigan football team portrait

Biographical details
- Born: December 13, 1897; Michigan, U.S.
- Died: June 3, 1986 (aged 88); Indian Wells, California, U.S.

Playing career
- 1919–1921: Michigan
- Positions: Quarterback, halfback

Coaching career (HC unless noted)

Football
- 1923–?: Patterson HS (LA)
- 1929–1934: Tulane (backs)
- 1935–1940: Idaho

Baseball
- 1930, 1932: Tulane

Administrative career (AD unless noted)
- 1935–1941: Idaho

Head coaching record
- Overall: 18–33–3 (college football); 0–17 (baseball)

Ted Bank
- Military career
- Allegiance: United States
- Branch: United States Army; United States Army Reserve
- Service years: 1916–1945
- Rank: Colonel
- Units: Infantry; Athletics & Recreation
- Conflicts: World War I, World War II

Theodore Paul Bank (December 13, 1897 – June 3, 1986) was an American college football player, coach, and athletic director.

Bank was a starting quarterback for Fielding Yost's 1920 and 1921 Wolverine football teams. He graduated from the university in 1923 and began a career in coaching, beginning at the high school level in Louisiana. From 1929 to 1935, he was an assistant football coach at Tulane University. He also served as the head baseball coach at Tulane in 1930 and 1932, in addition to serving as the university's boxing coach. In 1935, Bank was hired as the head football coach and athletic director at the University of Idaho, positions which he held until January 1941. From February 1941 to January 1945, Bank again served in the U.S. Army, as chief of the Army's athletics and recreation branch for three years and attained the rank of colonel. In January 1945, Bank became president of the Athletic Institute of America, a non-profit organization based in Chicago serving to promote physical fitness and athletics in the U.S., and served in that office through 1966.

== Early years and World War I ==
Bank attended high school in Flint, Michigan, and after graduating, he enlisted in the U.S. Army at age 18. He served on the Mexican border and played quarterback for an Army football team. When the U.S. entered World War I in 1917, Bank served with the 32nd Infantry Division of the American Expeditionary Force in France. He saw combat in several battles and was gassed and suffered a knee injury from shrapnel. He was promoted to the rank of second lieutenant at age 20, although "a special dispensation had to be secured to make him an officer because he was under 21." Before the end of the war, he was again promoted to first lieutenant. Bank was decorated by both the French and British governments, receiving the French Croix de Guerre. After the war, Bank served with the Army of Occupation on the Rhine for more than six months.

== University of Michigan ==
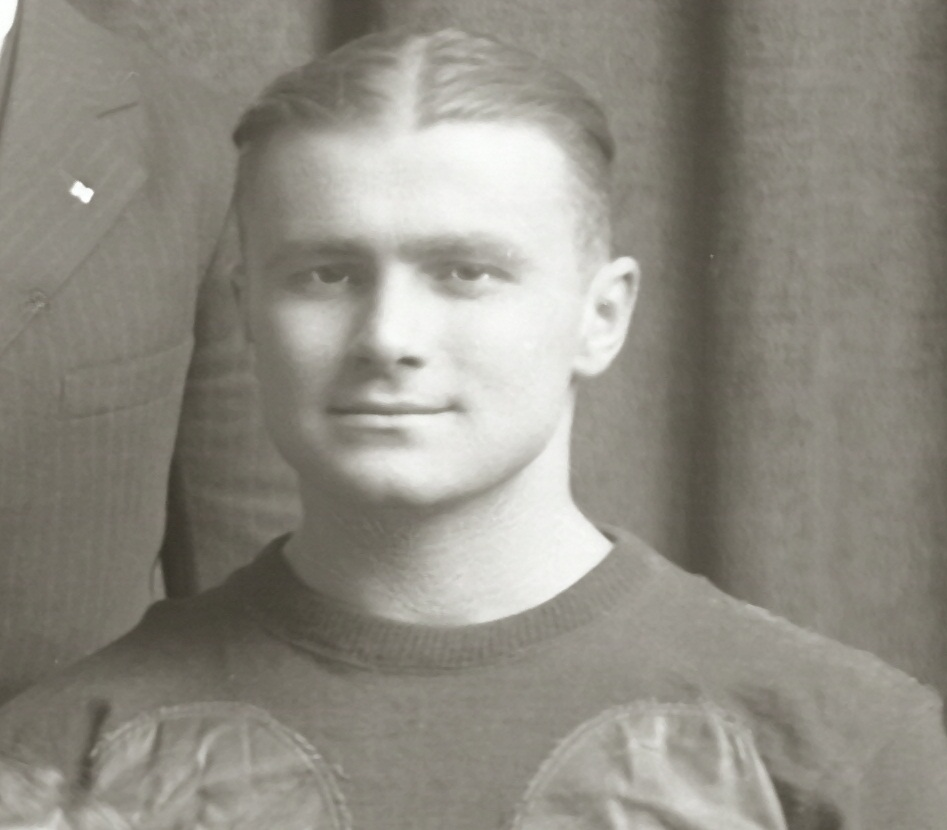
Bank in 1921

After his discharge from the military, Bank enrolled at the University of Michigan in Ann Arbor in 1919. Despite the wartime injury to his knee, Bank tried out for the Wolverines football team. A specially constructed knee brace enabled him to play football, and he played halfback on the freshman football team in 1919. In 1920, Bank started three of Michigan's seven games at quarterback. The Wolverines were undefeated and unscored upon in Bank's three games as the starting quarterback—a 21–0 victory over Tulane, a 14–0 victory over Chicago and a 3–0 victory over Minnesota. Press accounts indicated that he was "responsible in large measure" for Michigan's 14–0 victory over Amos Alonzo Stagg's Chicago Maroons. The Michigan Alumnus noted:

"For hours after the [Chicago] game was over Michigan students and alumni were singing the praises of Theodore Banks [sic], substitute quarterback. Put into the opening lineup almost at the eleventh hour, because of an injury to Jack Dunn, the little sophomore played the greatest game of the day. His generalship was faultless, his open field running was spectacular and above all he kept up the morale of the team in such a fashion that victory was never in doubt."

As a junior in 1921, Bank won the role as Michigan's starting quarterback. He started four of the team's six games at quarterback and a fifth game at left halfback. He was injured during the 1921 season, and Irwin Uteritz took over as starting quarterback. Michigan did not lose a game in which Bank played quarterback during the 1920 and 1921 seasons. Bank was mentioned by Walter Camp for All-American honors after the 1921 season and appeared to be a leading All-American candidate in 1922. However, a broken foot kept Bank from playing football as a senior. Several days after sustaining the injury, Bank was married to Madylin Huber of Detroit at the home of his parents. Bank stood with the aid of crutches during the wedding ceremony. He graduated from the university with a Bachelor of Arts degree in 1923.

== High school coaching career ==
Following college, Bank accepted a position in Louisiana as the head football coach at Patterson High School in St. Mary Parish, west of New Orleans. Coaching at a school with only fifty male students, Bank's teams in 1925 and 1926 did not allow a single point to be scored by its opponents.

== College coaching career ==
=== Tulane ===
In 1929, Bank was hired by Bernie Bierman as a football coach at Tulane University in New Orleans. He was the freshman coach under Bierman starting in 1929 and became an assistant coach under Ted Cox starting in 1932. During Bank's tenure at Tulane, the football team compiled records of 9–0, 8–1, 11–1, 6–2–1, 6–3–1, and 10–1. Bank also served as the head coach for the Tulane Green Wave baseball team in 1930 and 1932, but went winless with a record of 0–17. The author of a history of Tulane's baseball program noted:

"During two different seasons – 1930 and 1932 – Bank compiled a dismal 0–17 record. As a result, the university elected to drop baseball as a varsity sport. The minutes of the Tulane Athletic Council recorded 'a milestone in Tulane athletic history' with the unanimous passage of a motion to 'abolish baseball on campus in 1931 for ever {{nowrapand ever.'"

}} Bank also served as the boxing coach at Tulane. In 1934, he was on a list of candidates for the head coaching position at the University of Texas in Austin. At the time, a San Antonio newspaper gave Bank credit for the success of Tulane's backfield stars:

"His results speak for themselves. He has been a vital factor in the development of such backfield stars as Nollie Felts, Francis Payne, Red Dawson, Wop Glover, Johnny McDaniel, Joe Loftin and a dozen others. His boxing teams for five years have either won the Southern championship or been runner-up. They are defending champions again this year.... Bernie Bierman and Ted Cox both declare that Bank could do more to make a varsity player out of a scrub or freshman in a short space of time than anyone they had ever seen. ... His value for scouting duty has been vital, too. He is the chief scout for Coach Cox and one of the best in the business."

Tulane finished the 1934 season with a 10–1 record and a victory over Temple in the 1935 Sugar Bowl on New Year's Day.

=== Idaho ===
In February 1935, Bank was hired as the head football coach and athletic director at the University of Idaho in Moscow, then a member of the Pacific Coast Conference. Following a 4–3-1 record in his third season on the Palouse in 1937, Bank was on the short list of many to succeed Harry Kipke as head coach at Michigan, his alma mater. Bank denied interest in replacing Kipke, a teammate at Michigan, and told the press, "I am perfectly satisfied at Idaho. I have not been contacted by the Michigan athletic board and would think twice before leaving Idaho." In January 1938, Idaho's state board of education announced that Bank had signed a three-year contract renewal and would remain as the university's football coach and director of physical education. His best season came that fall, when the Vandals finished with a record of 6–3–1, with victories over Oregon State, Utah, and Utah State, and a tie with Washington. The 1937 and 1938 seasons were Idaho's only winning ones in football between 1927 and 1963, when the Vandals went 5–4 as an independent under Dee Andros (the tenth game on November 23 was canceled). The 1938 season was the highest winning percentage (.650) between 1927 and 1971. Consecutive winning seasons at Idaho were not achieved again until 1982–83 under Dennis Erickson in the Big Sky Conference in Division I-AA. (Idaho had fifteen consecutive winning seasons from 1982–96.)

The success of 1937 and 1938 was not maintained as Idaho went 2–6 in 1939 and 1–7–1 in 1940 (and winless in conference games), giving Bank a six-year record of 18–33–3 (.361). He was fired as the Vandals' head football coach in January 1941, part of an upheaval that included the resignation of basketball (and baseball) head coach Forrest Twogood.

== World War II military service ==
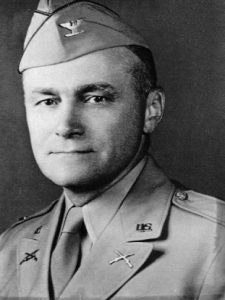
Col. Theodore Bank, chief of the Army's athletics and recreation branch during World War II

In February 1941, Bank, who had remained in the Army Reserves following his service in World War I, was ordered by the War Department to report for active duty in Washington, D.C. He was placed in charge of a $3 million program to build field houses and gymnasiums across the country. In February 1942, Bank was promoted from the rank of major to lieutenant colonel, and he eventually attained the rank of colonel. He was involved in organizing athletics and recreation in the U.S. and in overseas theaters of war. Bank was the chief of the Army's athletics and recreation branch for three years and in 1944 was named assistant to Maj. Gen. Joseph W. Byron, the head of the Army's special services division.

== Athletic Institute ==
In January 1945, Bank was released from the Army and was appointed as the president of the Athletic Institute of America, a non-profit group headquartered in Chicago and having the purpose of promoting physical fitness through athletics, recreation and research. As president of the Athletic Institute, Bank advocated the expansion of sports programs and espoused the view that collegiate and high school athletics played an important part in World War II and for the country's future preparedness. In April 1945, Bank noted, "If we had had such a program after the World War up to Pearl Harbor, we wouldn't have had married men with children being drafted, and sent into war zones. We wouldn't have had to take fathers because there wouldn't have been nearly so many rejections by draft boards, nor nearly so many medical discharges." In 1955, Bank delivered a speech in Los Angeles, telling recreation and athletic leaders that, with an increase of more than 11 million youngsters by 1956, there was "a crying need for increased youth instruction and athletic fields in America." Bank remained president of the Athletic Institute for more than 20 years, until his retirement at the end of 1966. At the end of 1966, Bank became the chairman of the board and was replaced as president by former Notre Dame football star, Larry "Moon" Mullins.

In June 1949, Bank received a master's degree in physical education from Springfield College.

In 1951, Bank was the recipient of the Simon A. McNeely Honor Award given annually by The Society of State Leaders of Health and Physical Education. In 1966, USA Volleyball awarded him the George J. Fisher Leader in Volleyball Award.

In October 1973, the University of Idaho honored Bank (then residing in Palm Desert, California) with "Coach Bank Day," including a reunion with 85 former Idaho athletes and a dinner in his honor. He was also inducted into the Idaho Athletic Hall of Fame.

== Family and later years ==
Bank and his wife had two children. Their son, Theodore P. Bank II (1923–1981), was an anthropologist and explorer. In 1950, Ted Bank Sr., and/or Ted Bank, Jr., led an expedition by University of Michigan scientists to the Aleutian Islands and discovered ancient cave dwellings on an unnamed rock off the southwestern tip of Tanaga Island. The rock was given the designation, "Michigan Rock."

Bank died in June 1986 at age 88; he was a resident of Indian Wells, California, at the time of his death.

== Head coaching record ==
=== College football ===
Year	Team	Overall	Conference	Standing	Bowl/playoffs
Idaho Vandals (Pacific Coast Conference) (1935–1940)
1935	Idaho	2–7	1–5	9th	
1936	Idaho	3–7	0–4	10th	
1937	Idaho	4–3–1	2–2	6th	
1938	Idaho	6–3–1	2–3–1	7th	
1939	Idaho	2–6	0–3	10th	
1940	Idaho	1–7–1	0–4	10th	
Idaho:		18–33–3	5–21–1		
Total:		18–33–3			
