= 1938 San Jose State Spartans football team =

American college football season

1938 San Jose State Spartans football
- Conference: Independent
- Record: 11–1
- Head coach: Dudley DeGroot (7th season)
- Home stadium: Spartan Stadium

1938 Western college football independents records
	Conf.			Overall
Team	W	L	T	W		L		T
San Jose State		–		11	–	1	–	0
Cal Poly		–		7	–	2	–	0
Santa Clara		–		6	–	2	–	0
Saint Mary's		–		6	–	2	–	0
San Francisco		–		5	–	2	–	1
Humboldt State		–		4	–	2	–	0
Idaho Southern Branch		–		4	–	3	–	0
Portland		–		5	–	3	–	0
Hawaii		–		4	–	4	–	0
Loyola (CA)		–		4	–	5	–	0
San Francisco State		–		2	–	5	–	0
La Verne		–		1	–	4	–	0
Santa Barbara State		–		2	–	8	–	0
Gonzaga		–		1	–	7	–	0

The 1938 San Jose State Spartans football team represented San Jose State College. (Note: San Jose State University was known as San Jose State College from 1935 to 1971.) The Spartans were led by seventh-year head coach Dudley DeGroot and played home games at Spartan Stadium. The team played as an Independent and finished with a record of eleven wins and one loss (11–1).

== Schedule ==
Date	Opponent	Site	Result	Attendance	Source
September 19	Arizona State	Spartan Stadium; San Jose, CA	W 18–7	10,000	
September 23	California JV	Spartan Stadium; San Jose, CA	W 39–12		
September 30	Caltech	Spartan Stadium; San Jose, CA	W 52–0		
October 7	Humboldt State	Spartan Stadium; San Jose, CA	W 48–0	7,500	
October 14	at Pacific (OR)	Hanson Stadium; Forest Grove, OR	W 39–0		
October 21	Pacific (CA)	Spartan Stadium; San Jose, CA (rivalry)	W 19–6		
October 29	at San Diego State	Aztec Bowl; San Diego, CA	W 14–0	7,500	
November 5	at Santa Barbara State	La Playa Stadium; Santa Barbara, CA	W 20–0		
November 11	Redlands	Spartan Stadium; San Jose, CA	W 21–6		
November 20	at San Diego Marines (Note: The Marine Corps Recruit Depot (MCRD) in San Diego fielded a team that played against colleges and other military teams from 1922 to 1964.)	Beeson Field; San Diego, CA	W 6–0		
November 24	Arizona State–Flagstaff	Spartan Stadium; San Jose, CA	W 34–12		
December 3	at Hawaii	Honolulu Stadium; Honolulu, Territory of Hawaii (rivalry)	L 12–13	18,000	
