= 1938 Fresno State Bulldogs football team =

American college football season

1938 Fresno State Bulldogs football
- Conference: Far Western Conference
- Record: 7–3 (2–1 FWC)
- Head coach: James Bradshaw (3rd season)
- Home stadium: Fresno State College Stadium

1938 Far Western Conference football standings
	Conf.					Overall
Team	W		L		T	W		L		T
Pacific (CA) $	4	–	0	–	0	7	–	3	–	0
Fresno State	2	–	1	–	0	7	–	3	–	0
Nevada	1	–	2	–	0	2	–	3	–	1
Chico State	0	–	2	–	1	2	–	5	–	1
Cal Aggies	0	–	2	–	1	2	–	6	–	1
$ – Conference champion

The 1938 Fresno State Bulldogs football team represented Fresno State Normal School—now known as California State University, Fresno—during the 1938 college football season.

This was the last year Fresno State competed in the Far Western Conference (FWC). (Note: The Northern California Athletic Conference (NCAC) was known as the Far Western Conference (FWC) from its founding in 1925 to 1982.) They had been a charter member of the conference (founded in 1925). In their 14 years of FWC play, the Bulldogs won or shared the championship four times (1930, 1934, 1935, 1937). Fresno State became a charter member of the California Collegiate Athletic Association (CCAA) in 1939.

The 1938 team was led by third-year head coach James Bradshaw and played home games at Fresno State College Stadium (Note: Ratcliffe Stadium was known as Fresno State College Stadium from 1926 to 1940.) on the campus of Fresno City College in Fresno, California. They finished the season with a record of ten wins and one loss (7–3, 2–1 FWC). The Bulldogs outscored their opponents 224–99 for the season.

== Schedule ==
Date	Opponent	Site	Result	Attendance	Source
October 1	San Diego Marines (Note: The Marine Corps Recruit Depot (MCRD) in San Diego fielded a team that played against colleges and other military teams from 1922 to 1964.)*	Fresno State College Stadium; Fresno, CA	W 34–14	6,850	
October 8	California JV*	Fresno State College Stadium; Fresno, CA	W 27–7	5,479	
October 15	Arkansas State Teachers*	Fresno State College Stadium; Fresno, CA	W 34–0	7,954	
October 22	at Nevada	Mackay Stadium (Note: This stadium is the predecessor to the current Mackay Stadium, which was opened for the 1966 season.); Reno, NV	W 27–0	6,000	
October 29	Cal Aggies	Fresno State College Stadium; Fresno, CA	W 34–7	3,209	
November 4	at Pacific (CA)	Baxter Stadium; Stockton, CA	L 13–18	9,000	
November 11	San Francisco*	Fresno State College Stadium; Fresno, CA	L 6–14	4,936	
November 18	Hawaii*	Fresno State College Stadium; Fresno, CA (rivalry)	W 15–13	4,866	
November 24	Santa Barbara State*	Fresno State College Stadium; Fresno, CA	W 28–0	6,756	
December 3	Texas Mines*	Fresno State College Stadium; Fresno, CA	L 6–26	5,000	
*Non-conference game
