= 1938 San Francisco State Staters football team =

American college football season

1938 San Francisco State Staters football
- Conference: Independent
- Record: 2–5
- Head coach: Dan Farmer & Hal Hardin (4th season)
- Home stadium: Roberts Field

1938 Western college football independents records
| | Conf. | | | Overall |
| Team | W | L | T | W | | L | | T |
|---|---|---|---|---|---|---|---|---|
| San Jose State | | – | | 11 | – | 1 | – | 0 |
| Cal Poly | | – | | 7 | – | 2 | – | 0 |
| Santa Clara | | – | | 6 | – | 2 | – | 0 |
| Saint Mary's | | – | | 6 | – | 2 | – | 0 |
| San Francisco | | – | | 5 | – | 2 | – | 1 |
| Humboldt State | | – | | 4 | – | 2 | – | 0 |
| Idaho Southern Branch | | – | | 4 | – | 3 | – | 0 |
| Portland | | – | | 5 | – | 3 | – | 0 |
| Hawaii | | – | | 4 | – | 4 | – | 0 |
| Loyola (CA) | | – | | 4 | – | 5 | – | 0 |
| San Francisco State | | – | | 2 | – | 5 | – | 0 |
| La Verne | | – | | 1 | – | 4 | – | 0 |
| Santa Barbara State | | – | | 2 | – | 8 | – | 0 |
| Gonzaga | | – | | 1 | – | 7 | – | 0 |

The 1938 San Francisco State States football team represented San Francisco State College—now known as San Francisco State University—as an independent during the 1938 college football season. Led by Dan Farmer and Hal Hardin in their fourth and final season as co-head coaches, San Francisco State compiled a record of 2–5 and was outscored by its opponents 79 to 53. The team played home games at Roberts Field in San Francisco. Although the "Gator" was voted to be the mascot for the team in 1931, local newspaper articles called the team the "Staters" from 1935 through 1940.

== Schedule ==
| Date | Opponent | Site | Result | Attendance | Source |
|---|---|---|---|---|---|
| September 23 | Placer | Roberts Field; San Francisco, CA | L 0–6 | | |
| October 1 | at Cal Aggies | A Street field; Davis, CA | L 0–20 | 1,000 | |
| October 7 | Sacramento | Roberts Field; San Francisco, CA | W 0–7 | | |
| October 15 | at Chico State | Chico High School Stadium; Chico, CA | L 6–14 | | |
| October 21 | Cal Poly | Roberts Field; San Francisco, CA | L 2–20 | | |
| October 28 | San Francisco Junior College | Roberts Field; San Francisco, CA | W 19–0 | 7,000 | |
| November 4 | Linfield | Roberts Field; San Francisco, CA | W 26–12 | | |
| November 11 | at Nevada | Mackay Stadium (Note: This stadium is the predecessor to the current Mackay Stadium, which was opened for the 1966 season.); Reno, NV | Cancelled | | |
