= 1938 San Diego State Aztecs football team =

American college football season

1938 San Diego State Aztecs football
- Conference: Southern California Conference
- Record: 5–2–1 (2–1–1 SCC)
- Head coach: Leo Calland (4th season)
- Home stadium: Aztec Bowl

1938 Southern California Conference football standings
	Conf.					Overall
Team	W		L		T	W		L		T
Pomona $	4	–	0	–	1	6	–	0	–	1
Whittier	2	–	0	–	2	7	–	1	–	2
San Diego State	2	–	1	–	1	5	–	2	–	1
Redlands	2	–	3	–	0	3	–	5	–	0
Occidental	1	–	4	–	0	3	–	5	–	0
Caltech	0	–	3	–	0	1	–	7	–	0
$ – Conference champion

The 1938 San Diego State Aztecs football team represented San Diego State College (Note: San Diego State University was known as San Diego State College from 1935 to 1971.) during the 1938 college football season.

This was the last year San Diego State would compete in the Southern California Conference (SCC). The following year, the Aztecs and Santa Barbara State would leave the SCIAC and join Fresno State and San Jose State as charter members of the California Collegiate Athletic Association (CCAA). In the 13 years the Aztecs played in the SCIAC (1926–1938), they were conference champions twice (1936 & 1937).

The 1938 San Diego State team was led by head coach Leo Calland in his fourth season with the Aztecs. They played home games at Aztec Bowl in San Diego, California. The Aztecs finished the season with five wins, two losses and one tie (5–2–1, 3–1–1 SCIAC). Overall, the team outscored its opponents 82–69 for the season.

== Schedule ==
Date	Opponent	Site	Result	Attendance	Source
September 24	USS New Mexico (Note: The USS New Mexico was a navy battleship that was served in the Pacific before and during World War II.)*	Aztec Bowl; San Diego, CA	W 29–20	2,000	
October 1	Occidental	Aztec Bowl; San Diego, CA	W 8–0	4,500	
October 8	at Whittier	Hadley Field; Whittier, CA	T 6–6		
October 15	Pomona^{†}	Aztec Bowl; San Diego, CA	L 0–9	4,500	
October 22	at Redlands	Redlands Stadium (Note: This stadium is the predecessor to the current Ted Runner Stadium on the University of Redlands campus, which was opened for the 1968 season); Redlands, CA	W 14–7	2,000	
October 29	San Jose State*	Aztec Bowl; San Diego, CA	L 0–14	7,500	
November 11	at San Diego Marines (Note: The Marine Corps Recruit Depot (MCRD) in San Diego fielded a team that played against colleges and other military teams from 1922 to 1964.)*	Balboa Stadium; San Diego, CA	W 9–0	10,000	
November 19	at Santa Barbara State*	La Playa Stadium; Santa Barbara, CA	W 16–13		
November 24	at Nevada*	Mackay Stadium (Note: This stadium is the predecessor to the current Mackay Stadium, which was opened for the 1966 season."University of Nevada, Reno; Mackay Stadium".); Reno, NV	Cancelled		
*Non-conference game; ^{†}Homecoming
