= Saint Mary's Gaels football =

Intercollegiate American football team

Coordinates: 37.842°N 122.1045°W

- First season: 1892
- Last season: 2003
- Location: Moraga, California
- Stadium: Saint Mary's Stadium
- NCAA division: Division I-AA (now FCS) (1993– 2003)
- Conference: Independent
- Colors: Navy, red, and silver
- All-time record: 380–295–22 (.561)
- Bowl record: 1–2 (.333)

Conference championships
- 4 (FWC)
- Consensus All-Americans: 2 (1927, 1945)
- Rivalries: Santa Clara (Little Big Game); Oregon (Governors' Trophy Game)

For information on all Saint Mary's College of California sports, see Saint Mary's Gaels

The Saint Mary's Gaels football program was the intercollegiate American football team for Saint Mary's College of California in Moraga, California.

== History ==
=== Founding and early years ===
The school's first football team was fielded in 1892, and was initially dropped in 1899 after going 7–6 in that span. The football program resumed again in 1915. In 1920 came one of the worst defeats in college football history, an 18-touchdown, 127–0 defeat from neighboring Cal. The Gaels gained only 16 yards of offense the entire game. This loss drove St. Mary's to turn the program around by hiring Knute Rockne's protege, Slip Madigan, who helped SMC win four consecutive conference championships from 1925 to 1928.

=== Galloping Gaels era ===
By 1927, Saint Mary's developed into one of the strongest football programs on the West Coast. They defeated USC, UCLA, Cal, and Stanford. The Stanford team they defeated in 1927 went on to play in the Rose Bowl, as did the USC team they defeated in 1931. Slip also led the Gaels to the program's only two undefeated seasons in 1926, at 9–0–1, and 1929, at 8–0–1. Although the school's enrollment seldom exceeded 500, the 'Galloping Gaels' became a nationally known football power.

The famously red-clad jersey-ed 'Galloping Gaels', were known for their flashy style that reflected the personality of their flamboyant coach. In the most notable win in program history, Saint Mary's traveled to New York City in 1930 to play Fordham in front of 65,000 at New York City's famed Polo Grounds. Madigan traveled to New York for the game with 150 fans on a train that was labeled "The World's Longest Bar." To stir up publicity for the game, he then threw a party the night before the game and invited sportswriters and celebrities. Babe Ruth and New York mayor Jimmy Walker attended the party. Fordham was a heavy favorite, as the Rams had won 16 straight games going back to 1928. They featured the first version of a defense known as the "Seven Blocks of Granite," a formidable unit that later would include Vince Lombardi. Saint Mary's recovered from a 12–0 halftime deficit to win, 20–12.

The Gaels had a couple of shots at a national championship in the 1930s. A one-point loss to Cal in SMC’s opener in 1930 probably cost the school the No. 1 spot. In 1934, the Gaels beat Fordham and Cal, but were upset by Nevada, 9–7, and lost to UCLA, 6–0, and another national title had slipped away. The Gaels won the Cotton Bowl in January 1939 and lost in the Sugar Bowl in January 1946. That 1945 team won its first seven games and was ranked seventh in the AP poll entering the bowl game. They also lost in the 1946 Oil Bowl the following year. Many home games of this era were played to sold-out crowds at Kezar Stadium in San Francisco.

=== Program revival ===
The football program was dropped after the 1950 season, first revived as a club sport, and then returned to sanctioned varsity status in 1970 (College Division, later Division III), and moved up to Division II in 1980.

=== Modern Division I era and end of program ===
In order to keep its overall athletics program at Division I, football was required to cease or move up to Division I-AA by 1993. (Rival Santa Clara discontinued football after 1992.) The team competed in NCAA Division I-AA as an independent from 1993 through 2003.

By 1998, Saint Mary's awarded 14 scholarships in football (vastly under the FCS limit of 63), with a budget of almost $800,000.

However, after eleven seasons as a Division I-AA independent, Saint Mary's ended its football program on March 3, 2004, citing budgetary reasons. The announcement came a week after the institution had declared intent to join the Great West Football Conference, rendering SMC as the 17th California university to drop football since 1951.

During fall 2004, an informal survey on campus found little support for bringing back football.

== Conference affiliation ==
• 1892-1899: Independent

• 1915-1924: Independent

• 1925-1928: Far Western Conference

• 1929-1950: Independent

• 1970-1979: College Division-Division III Independent

• 1980-1992: Division II Independent

• 1993-2003: Division I-AA Independent

== Conference championships ==
St. Mary's won four consecutive conference championships in a row in their only time associated in an athletic conference. The Gaels have been an independent all other years of existence.

Year	Conference	Coach	Overall Record	Conference Record
1925	Far Western	Slip Madigan	8-2	3–0
1926	Far Western	Slip Madigan	9–0–1	4–0
1927	Far Western	Slip Madigan	7–2–1	3–0
1928	Far Western	Slip Madigan	5–4	2–0

== Bowl games ==
Season	Bowls	City	Opponent	Result
1938	Cotton	Dallas	Texas Tech	W 20–13
1945	Sugar	New Orleans	Oklahoma A&M	L 13–33
1946	Oil	Houston	Georgia Tech	L 19–41

== Head coaches ==
Slip Madigan and James Phelan are the only coaches that have led the 'Galloping Gaels' to bowl games.

Coach	Seasons	Record	Pct.	Bowl Record
Slip Madigan	1921–1939	117–45–12	.707	1–0
Red Strader	1940–1941	10–7	.588	
James Phelan	1942–1947	47–25–1	.490	0–2
Joe Verducci	1948–1949	7–12–1	.375	
Joe Ruetz	1950	2–7–1	.250	

== Rivalries ==
=== Oregon ===
Oregon and Saint Mary's College competed in an annual Thanksgiving Day classic between 1929 and 1935, played at Kezar Stadium in San Francisco's Golden Gate Park. The victors were awarded The Governors' Perpetual Trophy jointly by the governors of the states of California and Oregon. The Gaels hold a 7–3 lead in the series and final possession of the trophy. The rivalry is unlikely to be contested again, as Saint Mary's discontinued football in 1951 due to the national emergency resulting from the Korean War, and reinstated its program in 1970, only to discontinue it again after the 2003 football season.

== College Football Hall of Fame ==
Name	Years	Position	Inducted	Ref
Larry Bettencourt	1924-1927	C / DE	1973	
James Phelan	1942-1947	Head coach	1973	
Slip Madigan	1921-1939	Head coach	1974	
Herman Wedemeyer	1943, 1945-1947	HB	1979	

== Pro Football Hall of Fame ==
Inducted	Player	POS	Seasons at St. Mary's	Ref.
1987	John Henry Johnson	HB/ FB	1949-1950	

== National Award Winners ==
- National Football Foundation Scholar-Athlete of the Year Award

Sean Laird (1997)

== All-Americans ==
Saint Mary's has 2 Consensus All-Americans and 1 Unanimous All-American (Herman Wedemeyer, HB- 1945)

St. Mary’s Gaels All-Americans
Player	Position	Season	Poll	Team	Notes
Red Strader	FB	1924	3rd Team		
Larry Bettencourt	C	1925	NB	1st Team	College Football Hall of Fame member
Larry Bettencourt	C	1926	3rd Team		College Football Hall of Fame member
Larry Bettencourt	C	1927	Consensus	1st Team	College Football Hall of Fame member
Underhill	DE	1926	AP	2nd Team	
Malcolm Franklin	DE	1928	AP	1st Team	
Malcolm Franklin	DE	1928	UP	2nd Team	
George Ackerman	T	1929	AP	1st Team	
George Ackerman	T	1929	UP	2nd Team	
Fred "Stud" Stennett	HB	1929	UP	2nd Team	
Fred "Stud" Stennett	HB	1930	AP	3rd Team	
Dick Boyle	HB	1929	3rd Team		
Harry Ebding	DE	1930	AP	3rd Team/ 2nd Team	
Bud Toscani	HB	1931	2nd Team		
Bill Fisher	G	1931	AP	1st Team	
Bill Fisher	G	1931	UP	1st Team	
Angelo Brovelli	FB	1932	UP	3rd Team	
Angelo Brovelli	FB	1932	NEA	3rd Team	
Angelo Brovelli	FB	1932	FWAA	1st Team	
Mike Steponovich	G	1932	AP	3rd Team	
William "Bill" Beasley	QB	1932	3rd Team		
Ed Gilbert	G	1933	AP	2nd Team	
Fred Conrinus	DE	1933	UP	3rd Team	
John Yezerski	DT	1933	NEA	1st Team	
Carl Jorgensen	DT	1933	1st Team		
Carl Jorgensen	DT	1933	UP	2nd Team/3rd Team	
George Wilson	HB	1933	AP	2nd Team	
George Wilson	HB	1933	UP	3rd Team	
Marty Kordick	G	1935	NEA	2nd Team	
Herman Wedemeyer	HB	1945	Consensus (Unanimous All American (Note: AAB; AFCA; AP-1; COL-1; FWAA-1; INS-1; LK; SN; UP-1; CNS-1; CP-1; NL; OF-1; WC-1))	1st Team	College Football Hall of Fame
Herman Wedemeyer	HB	1946	AP	2nd Team	College Football Hall of Fame
Herman Wedemeyer	HB	1946	UP	2nd Team	College Football Hall of Fame

== Notable players ==
- Larry Bettencourt
- Tony Compagno
- Ryan Coogler
- Eddie Erdelatz
- John Henry Johnson
- Wagner Jorgensen
- Dante Magnani
- Andy Marefos
- Dick Mesak
- Chase Peterson
- Bud Toscani
- Herman Wedemeyer
- Willie Wilkin
- Scott Wood
