= 1938 UCLA Bruins football team =

American college football season

1938 UCLA Bruins football

Poi Bowl, W 32–7 vs. Hawaii
- Conference: Pacific Coast Conference
- Record: 7–4–1 (4–3–1 PCC)
- Head coach: William H. Spaulding (14th season)
- Home stadium: Los Angeles Memorial Coliseum

1938 Pacific Coast Conference football standings
	Conf.					Overall
Team	W		L		T	W		L		T
No. 7 USC +	6	–	1	–	0	9	–	2	–	0
No. 14 California +	6	–	1	–	0	10	–	1	–	0
UCLA	4	–	3	–	1	7	–	4	–	1
Oregon State	4	–	3	–	1	5	–	3	–	1
Oregon	4	–	4	–	0	4	–	5	–	0
Washington	3	–	4	–	1	3	–	5	–	1
Idaho	2	–	3	–	1	6	–	3	–	1
Stanford	2	–	5	–	0	3	–	6	–	0
Washington State	1	–	7	–	0	2	–	8	–	0
Montana	0	–	1	–	0	5	–	3	–	1
+ – Conference co-champions; Rankings from AP Poll

The 1938 UCLA Bruins football team represented the University of California, Los Angeles (UCLA) in the 1938 college football season. Coached by William H. Spaulding, the Bruins finished the season with a 7–4–1 record and made their first postseason appearance in a bowl game. The Poi Bowl featured the Bruins playing the Hawaii Rainbow Warriors on January 2, 1939, in Honolulu. The Bruins season offense scored 217 points while the defense allowed 106 points. George Pfeiffer and Hal Hirshon served as Co-Captains of the team. Center John Ryland was selected to the PCC First-Team All Coast and drafted by the Cleveland Rams of the National Football League (NFL) in 1939. The team also featured future Baseball Hall of Famer Jackie Robinson, Hollywood actor Woody Strode, Football Hall of Famer Kenny Washington. and Bill Overlin.

This was the Bruins' 14th and last season with Spaulding as coach, and the following season new head coach Edwin C. Horrell took over.

== Schedule ==
Date	Opponent	Site	Result	Attendance	Source
September 23	Iowa*	Los Angeles Memorial Coliseum; Los Angeles, CA	W 27–3	40,000	
October 1	at Oregon	Hayward Field; Eugene, OR	L 12–14	7,500	
October 8	Washington	Los Angeles Memorial Coliseum; Los Angeles, CA	W 13–0	40,000	
October 15	at California	California Memorial Stadium; Berkeley, CA (rivalry)	L 7–20	40,000	
October 22	Idaho	Los Angeles Memorial Coliseum; Los Angeles, CA	W 33–0	25,000	
October 29	Stanford	Los Angeles Memorial Coliseum; Los Angeles, CA	W 6–0	37,000	
November 5	at Washington State	Rogers Field; Pullman, WA	W 21–0	8,000	
November 12	No. 15 Wisconsin*	Los Angeles Memorial Coliseum; Los Angeles, CA	L 7–14	35,000	
November 24	at No. 14 USC	Los Angeles Memorial Coliseum; Los Angeles, CA (Victory Bell)	L 7–42	65,000	
December 10	Oregon State	Los Angeles Memorial Coliseum; Los Angeles, CA	T 6–6	10,000	
December 26	at Honolulu Town*	Honolulu Stadium; Honolulu, Territory of Hawaii	W 46–0	9,000	
January 2	at Hawaii*	Honolulu Stadium; Honolulu, Territory of Hawaii (Poi Bowl)	W 32–7	18,000	
*Non-conference game; Rankings from AP Poll released prior to the game; Source:

== 1938 team players in the NFL ==
The following player was claimed in the 1939 NFL draft.

Player	Position	Round	Pick	NFL club
John Ryland	Center	14	123	Cleveland Browns

- Team member Jackie Robinson would go on to a career in Major League Baseball.
