= 1938 Gonzaga Bulldogs football team =

American college football season

1938 Gonzaga Bulldogs football
- Conference: Independent
- Record: 1–7
- Head coach: Mike Pecarovich (8th season)
- Home stadium: Gonzaga Stadium

1938 Western college football independents records
	Conf.			Overall
Team	W	L	T	W		L		T
San Jose State		–		11	–	1	–	0
Cal Poly		–		7	–	2	–	0
Santa Clara		–		6	–	2	–	0
Saint Mary's		–		6	–	2	–	0
San Francisco		–		5	–	2	–	1
Humboldt State		–		4	–	2	–	0
Idaho Southern Branch		–		4	–	3	–	0
Portland		–		5	–	3	–	0
Hawaii		–		4	–	4	–	0
Loyola (CA)		–		4	–	5	–	0
San Francisco State		–		2	–	5	–	0
La Verne		–		1	–	4	–	0
Santa Barbara State		–		2	–	8	–	0
Gonzaga		–		1	–	7	–	0

The 1938 Gonzaga Bulldogs football team was an American football team that represented Gonzaga University as an independent during the 1938 college football season. In their eighth and final year under head coach Mike Pecarovich, the Bulldogs compiled a 1–7 record and were outscored by a total of 105 to 82.

== Schedule ==
Date	Opponent	Site	Result	Attendance	Source
September 23	Puget Sound	Gonzaga Stadium; Spokane, WA	W 38–0		
October 2	at Saint Mary's	Kezar Stadium; San Francisco, CA	L 0–20	12,000	
October 15	at Idaho	Neale Stadium; Moscow, ID	L 12–26	6,500	
October 29	Washington State	Gonzaga Stadium; Spokane, WA	L 13–15	9,000	
November 4	Montana	Gonzaga Stadium; Spokane, WA	L 0–9		
November 11	at Texas Tech	Tech Field; Lubbock, TX	L 0–7	10,000	
November 20	San Francisco	Gonzaga Stadium; Spokane, WA	L 0–8		
November 27	at Loyola	Gilmore Stadium; Los Angeles, CA	L 19–20	7,000	
