= 1938 Idaho Vandals football team =

American college football season

1938 Idaho Vandals football
- Conference: Pacific Coast Conference
- Record: 6–3–1 (2–3–1 PCC)
- Head coach: Ted Bank (4th season)
- Home stadium: Neale Stadium

1938 Pacific Coast Conference football standings
	Conf.					Overall
Team	W		L		T	W		L		T
No. 7 USC +	6	–	1	–	0	9	–	2	–	0
No. 14 California +	6	–	1	–	0	10	–	1	–	0
UCLA	4	–	3	–	1	7	–	4	–	1
Oregon State	4	–	3	–	1	5	–	3	–	1
Oregon	4	–	4	–	0	4	–	5	–	0
Washington	3	–	4	–	1	3	–	5	–	1
Idaho	2	–	3	–	1	6	–	3	–	1
Stanford	2	–	5	–	0	3	–	6	–	0
Washington State	1	–	7	–	0	2	–	8	–	0
Montana	0	–	1	–	0	5	–	3	–	1
+ – Conference co-champions; Rankings from AP Poll

The 1938 Idaho Vandals football team represented the University of Idaho in the 1938 college football season. The Vandals were led by fourth-year head coach Ted Bank and were members of the Pacific Coast Conference. Home games were played on campus in Moscow at Neale Stadium, in its second season.

Led on the field by passing halfback Hal Roise, Idaho compiled a 6–3–1 overall record and were 2–3–1 in the PCC.

After an opening win at Oregon State, the Vandals went to Husky Stadium in Seattle and tied Washington, breaking a 13-game losing streak to the Huskies. The teams previously tied in 1907 and Idaho's only wins came in 1900 and 1905; the Huskies have won all 19 games in this series since, all in Seattle, last meeting in 2016.

Late October marked the 25th game with Montana and the first for the Little Brown Stein trophy. With the 19–6 win in Missoula on homecoming, Idaho extended its series advantage over the Grizzlies to 19–5–1 (.780).

In the Battle of the Palouse with neighbor Washington State, the Vandals suffered an eleventh straight loss, falling 12–0 in the snow at homecoming on November 12. It was the Cougars' first visit to and Idaho's first loss in Neale Stadium, which opened the previous year; the Vandals had won the first five games played there. The next win over Washington State came in 1954.

Idaho finished the season with a two-game road trip to the state of Utah. Using their second string, the Vandals won 14–0 over Utah State of Logan in Ogden; five days later they won 16–0 over undefeated Mountain States conference champion Utah in Salt Lake City on Thanksgiving.

The six wins were the most for the UI program and was not improved upon for 33 more years, until the 8–3 season in 1971 under Don Robbins. It was also the only winning season for a quarter century, until Dee Andros' 1963 team posted a 5–4 mark. In between, three teams had even .500 records: 1947, 1952, and 1957. This was the last season in which the Vandals recorded two PCC wins; the conference disbanded in the spring of 1959. They did not have consecutive winning seasons again until 1983, the second of fifteen straight.

Future coaches (and administrators) that played on this team included seniors Steve Belko, Tony Knap, and Lyle Smith.

== Schedule ==
Date	Opponent	Site	Result	Attendance	Source
September 24	at Oregon State	Bell Field; Corvallis, OR	W 13–0		
October 1	at Washington	Husky Stadium; Seattle, WA	T 12–12	20,000	
October 8	North Dakota Agricultural*	Neale Stadium; Moscow, ID	W 27–0	7,000	
October 15	Gonzaga*	Neale Stadium; Moscow, ID (rivalry)	W 26–12	6,500	
October 22	at UCLA	Los Angeles Memorial Coliseum; Los Angeles, CA	L 0–33	25,000	
October 29	at Montana	Dornblaser Field; Missoula, MT (Little Brown Stein)	W 19–6	8,000	
November 5	at Oregon	Hayward Field; Eugene, OR	L 6–19	8,000	
November 12	Washington State^{†}	Neale Stadium; Moscow, ID (Battle of the Palouse)	L 0–12	8,000	
November 19	at Utah State*	Ogden Stadium; Ogden, UT	W 14–0		
November 24	at Utah*	Ute Stadium; Salt Lake City, UT	W 16–0	15,000	
*Non-conference game; ^{†}Homecoming

== Coaching staff ==
- Bob Tessier, line
- Forrest Twogood
- Glenn Jacoby
- Walt Price, freshmen

== All-conference ==
No Vandals were named to the All-Coast team; end Tony Knap was a second team selection.

== NFL draft ==
Two Vandal seniors were selected in the 1939 NFL draft, which lasted 22 rounds (200 selections).

Player	Position	Round	Overall	Franchise
Dick Trzuskowski	Tackle	8th	67	Detroit Lions
Hal Roise	Back	12th	106	Chicago Bears
