= 1938 Hawaii Rainbows football team =

American college football season

1938 Hawaii Rainbows football

Poi Bowl, L 7–32 vs. UCLA
- Conference: Independent
- Record: 4–4
- Head coach: Otto Klum (18th season)
- Home stadium: Honolulu Stadium

1938 Western college football independents records
	Conf.			Overall
Team	W	L	T	W		L		T
San Jose State		–		11	–	1	–	0
Cal Poly		–		7	–	2	–	0
Santa Clara		–		6	–	2	–	0
Saint Mary's		–		6	–	2	–	0
San Francisco		–		5	–	2	–	1
Humboldt State		–		4	–	2	–	0
Idaho Southern Branch		–		4	–	3	–	0
Portland		–		5	–	3	–	0
Hawaii		–		4	–	4	–	0
Loyola (CA)		–		4	–	5	–	0
San Francisco State		–		2	–	5	–	0
La Verne		–		1	–	4	–	0
Santa Barbara State		–		2	–	8	–	0
Gonzaga		–		1	–	7	–	0

The 1938 Hawaii Rainbows football team represented the University of Hawaiʻi (now known as the University of Hawaiʻi at Mānoa) as an independent during the 1938 college football season. Led by 18th-year head coach Otto Klum, the Rainbows compiled an overall record of 4–4.

== Schedule ==
Date	Opponent	Site	Result	Attendance	Source
October 7	Kamehameha alumni	Honolulu Stadium; Honolulu, Territory of Hawaii	W 18–8	9,000	
October 14	Honolulu Town Team	Honolulu Stadium; Honolulu, Territory of Hawaii	W 19–12	15,000	
October 21	Pearl Harbor Navy	Honolulu Stadium; Honolulu, Territory of Hawaii	W 33–0	16,000	
November 12	at Denver	DU Stadium; Denver, CO	L 12–20	7,619	
November 18	at Fresno State	Fresno State College Stadium; Fresno, CA (rivalry)	L 13–15	4,866	
December 3	San Jose State	Honolulu Stadium; Honolulu, Territory of Hawaii (rivalry)	W 13–12	18,000	
December 17	Utah	Honolulu Stadium; Honolulu, Territory of Hawaii	L 13–14	17,500	
January 2	UCLA	Honolulu Stadium; Honolulu, Territory of Hawaii (Poi Bowl)	L 7–32	18,000	
