= 1938 USC Trojans football team =

American college football season

1938 USC Trojans football

PCC co-champion Rose Bowl champion

Rose Bowl, W 7–3 vs. Duke
- Conference: Pacific Coast Conference

Ranking
- AP: No. 7
- Record: 9–2 (6–1 PCC)
- Head coach: Howard Jones (14th season)
- Captain: Don McNeil
- Home stadium: Los Angeles Memorial Coliseum

1938 Pacific Coast Conference football standings
	Conf.					Overall
Team	W		L		T	W		L		T
No. 7 USC +	6	–	1	–	0	9	–	2	–	0
No. 14 California +	6	–	1	–	0	10	–	1	–	0
UCLA	4	–	3	–	1	7	–	4	–	1
Oregon State	4	–	3	–	1	5	–	3	–	1
Oregon	4	–	4	–	0	4	–	5	–	0
Washington	3	–	4	–	1	3	–	5	–	1
Idaho	2	–	3	–	1	6	–	3	–	1
Stanford	2	–	5	–	0	3	–	6	–	0
Washington State	1	–	7	–	0	2	–	8	–	0
Montana	0	–	1	–	0	5	–	3	–	1
+ – Conference co-champions; Rankings from AP Poll

The 1938 USC Trojans football team represented the University of Southern California (USC) in the 1938 college football season. In their 14th year under head coach Howard Jones, the Trojans compiled a 9–2 record (6–1 against conference opponents), finished in a tie for the Pacific Coast Conference championship, defeated Duke in the 1939 Rose Bowl, and outscored their opponents by a combined total of 172 to 65.

== Schedule ==
Date	Opponent	Rank	Site	Result	Attendance	Source
September 24	Alabama*		Los Angeles Memorial Coliseum; Los Angeles, CA	L 7–19	70,000	
October 1	Oregon State		Los Angeles Memorial Coliseum; Los Angeles, CA	W 7–0	35,000	
October 8	at Ohio State*		Ohio Stadium; Columbus, OH	W 14–7	62,778	
October 15	Washington State		Los Angeles Memorial Coliseum; Los Angeles, CA	W 19–6	35,000	
October 22	at Stanford		Stanford Stadium; Stanford, CA (rivalry)	W 13–2	35,000	
October 29	at Oregon	No. 19	Multnomah Stadium; Portland, OR	W 31–7	14,500	
November 5	No. 3 California	No. 13	Los Angeles Memorial Coliseum; Los Angeles, CA	W 13–7	95,000	
November 12	at Washington	No. 9	Husky Stadium; Seattle, WA	L 6–7	18,939	
November 24	UCLA	No. 14	Los Angeles Memorial Coliseum; Los Angeles, CA (Victory Bell)	W 42–7	65,000	
December 3	No. 1 Notre Dame*^{†}	No. 8	Los Angeles Memorial Coliseum; Los Angeles, CA (rivalry)	W 13–0	101,000	
January 2, 1939	vs. No. 3 Duke*	No. 7	Rose Bowl; Pasadena, CA (Rose Bowl)	W 7–3	89,452	
*Non-conference game; ^{†}Homecoming; Rankings from AP Poll released prior to the game; Source:
