= 1938 Saint Mary's Gaels football team =

American college football season

1938 Saint Mary's Gaels football

Cotton Bowl Classic champion

Cotton Bowl Classic, W 20–13 vs. Texas Tech
- Conference: Independent
- Record: 6–2
- Head coach: Slip Madigan (18th season)
- Home stadium: Kezar Stadium

1938 Western college football independents records
	Conf.			Overall
Team	W	L	T	W		L		T
San Jose State		–		11	–	1	–	0
Cal Poly		–		7	–	2	–	0
Santa Clara		–		6	–	2	–	0
Saint Mary's		–		6	–	2	–	0
San Francisco		–		5	–	2	–	1
Humboldt State		–		4	–	2	–	0
Idaho Southern Branch		–		4	–	3	–	0
Portland		–		5	–	3	–	0
Hawaii		–		4	–	4	–	0
Loyola (CA)		–		4	–	5	–	0
San Francisco State		–		2	–	5	–	0
La Verne		–		1	–	4	–	0
Santa Barbara State		–		2	–	8	–	0
Gonzaga		–		1	–	7	–	0

The 1938 Saint Mary's Gaels football team was an American football team that represented Saint Mary's College of California during the 1938 college football season. In their 18th season under head coach Slip Madigan, the Gaels compiled a 6–2 record and outscored their opponents by a combined total of 106 to 41. The season ended in January with a 20–13 victory over Texas Tech in the Cotton Bowl, led by sophomore back Mike Klotovich.

The Gaels were unranked in the AP poll for the entire season; the final poll was released in early December. They did not win a game on Saturday all season; all of the regular season wins were played on Sunday and the two losses were road games.

== Schedule ==
Date	Opponent	Site	Result	Attendance	Source
September 24	at California	Memorial Stadium; Berkeley, CA	L 7–12	50,000	
October 2	Gonzaga	Kezar Stadium; San Francisco, CA	W 20–0	12,000	
October 9	at Loyola (CA)	Memorial Coliseum; Los Angeles, CA	W 7–0	50,000	
October 16	Portland	Kezar Stadium; San Francisco, CA	W 32–7	8,000	
October 23	vs. San Francisco	Kezar Stadium; San Francisco, CA	W 13–6	20,000	
November 5	at No. 10 Fordham	Polo Grounds; New York, NY	L 0–3	44,274	
November 13	vs. No. 8 Santa Clara	Kezar Stadium; San Francisco, CA	W 7–0	60,000	
January 2, 1939	vs. No. 11 Texas Tech	Cotton Bowl; Dallas, TX (Cotton Bowl)	W 20–13	40,000	
Rankings from AP Poll released prior to the game

- Five games were played on Sunday (Gonzaga, Loyola, Portland, San Francisco, Santa Clara)

== Game summaries ==
=== At California ===
On September 24, the Gaels opened their 1938 season with a close 12–7 loss to California before a crowd of 50,000 in Berkeley. The preceding year's Cal team were undefeated and ended second-ranked in the final AP poll. The Gaels dominated the game for three quarters and led 7–0 at the start of the fourth quarter.

=== Gonzaga ===
On Sunday, October 2, the Gaels defeated Gonzaga 20–0 at Kezar Stadium in San Francisco. St. Mary's touchdowns were scored by Mike Klotovich, Ed Heffernan, and Mike Pierrie.

=== At Loyola ===
On Sunday, October 9, the Gaels defeated the Loyola Lions 7–0 at the Los Angeles Memorial Coliseum. Fullback Herb Smith scored the only touchdown.

=== Portland ===
On Sunday, October 16, the Gaels defeated Portland 32–7 at Kezar Stadium in San Francisco.

=== Vs. San Francisco ===
On Sunday, October 23, the Gaels defeated the San Francisco Dons 13–6 before 20,000 in the rain at Kezar. San Francisco took a 6–0 lead into the fourth quarter, but the Gaels' scored two touchdowns, first on a pass from Klotovich to Aronson and later on a 53-yard run by Klotovich.

=== At Fordham ===
The Gaels' November 5 game against tenth-ranked Fordham drew 44,274 to the Polo Grounds in New York City. A Fordham field goal in the second quarter counted for the game's only points, as Fordham defeated St. Mary's 3–0.

=== Vs. Santa Clara ===
Eight days after losing a close game to Fordham, the Gaels upset previously undefeated Santa Clara 7–0 before 60,000 at Kezar in San Francisco. It ended Santa Clara's 16-game winning streak, dating back to the 1936 season. Fullback Herb Smith scored the Gaels' touchdown.

=== Cotton Bowl ===
After the regular season, the Gaels were invited to play unbeaten and #11-ranked Texas Tech in the Cotton Bowl in Dallas on January 2, 1939. The Gaels took a 20–0 lead into the fourth quarter and held on to defeat the Red Raiders 20–13 before 40,000. St. Mary's touchdowns were scored by Ed Heffernan and Michael Klotovich and by Whitey Smith on an interception return for a touchdown.
