= 1938 Chico State Wildcats football team =

American college football season

1938 Chico State Wildcats football
- Conference: Far Western Conference
- Record: 2–5–1 (0–2–1 FWC)
- Head coach: Roy Bohler (1st season)
- Home stadium: College Field

1938 Far Western Conference football standings
	Conf.					Overall
Team	W		L		T	W		L		T
Pacific (CA) $	4	–	0	–	0	7	–	3	–	0
Fresno State	2	–	1	–	0	7	–	3	–	0
Nevada	1	–	2	–	0	2	–	3	–	1
Chico State	0	–	2	–	1	2	–	5	–	1
Cal Aggies	0	–	2	–	1	2	–	6	–	1
$ – Conference champion

The 1938 Chico State Wildcats football team represented Chico State College—now known as California State University, Chico—as a member of the Far Western Conference (FWC) during the 1938 college football season. Led by first-year head coach Roy Bohler, Chico State compiled an overall record of 2–5–1 with a mark of 0–2–1 in conference play, tying for fourth place in the FWC. The team was outscored by its opponents 95 to 53 for the season. The Wildcats played home games at College Field in Chico, California.

== Schedule ==
Date	Time	Opponent	Site	Result	Attendance	Source
October 1		at Cal Poly*	Mustang Stadium; San Luis Obispo, CA	L 7–14		
October 8		at Nevada	Mackay Stadium (Note: This stadium is the predecessor to the current Mackay Stadium, which was opened for the 1966 season.); Reno, NV	L 0–22		
October 15		San Francisco State*	College Field; Chico, CA	W 14–6		
October 22		Cal Aggies	College Field; Chico, CA	T 0–0		
October 29		Humboldt State*	College Field; Chico, CA	L 6–13		
November 5		at Southern Oregon Normal*	Ashland, OR	W 13–0		
November 11	2:00 p.m.	at Sacramento*	Sacramento Stadium; Sacramento, CA	L 0–20	3,000	
November 24		Pacific (CA)	College Field; Chico, CA	L 13–20		
*Non-conference game; All times are in Pacific time
