= 1938 Loyola Lions football team =

American college football season

1938 Loyola Lions football
- Conference: Independent
- Record: 4–5
- Head coach: Tom Lieb (9th season)
- Home stadium: Gilmore Stadium; Los Angeles Memorial Coliseum

1938 Western college football independents records
	Conf.			Overall
Team	W	L	T	W		L		T
San Jose State		–		11	–	1	–	0
Cal Poly		–		7	–	2	–	0
Santa Clara		–		6	–	2	–	0
Saint Mary's		–		6	–	2	–	0
San Francisco		–		5	–	2	–	1
Humboldt State		–		4	–	2	–	0
Idaho Southern Branch		–		4	–	3	–	0
Portland		–		5	–	3	–	0
Hawaii		–		4	–	4	–	0
Loyola (CA)		–		4	–	5	–	0
San Francisco State		–		2	–	5	–	0
La Verne		–		1	–	4	–	0
Santa Barbara State		–		2	–	8	–	0
Gonzaga		–		1	–	7	–	0

The 1938 Loyola Lions football team was an American football team that represented Loyola University of Los Angeles (now known as Loyola Marymount University) as an independent during the 1938 college football season. In their ninth and final season under head coach Tom Lieb, the Lions compiled a 4–5 record.

== Schedule ==
Date	Opponent	Site	Result	Attendance	Source
September 20	Caltech	Gilmore Stadium; Los Angeles, CA	W 51–0	9,000	
September 30	Pacific (CA)	Gilmore Stadium; Los Angeles, CA	W 7–0	17,000	
October 9	Saint Mary's	Los Angeles Memorial Coliseum; Los Angeles, CA	L 0–7	45,000	
October 14	Redlands	Gilmore Stadium; Los Angeles, CA	W 52–0	9,000	
October 21	Arizona	Gilmore Stadium; Los Angeles, CA	L 12–14	16,000	
October 30	at Centenary	Louisiana State Fair Stadium; Shreveport, LA	L 6–7	10,000	
November 11	Baylor	Los Angeles Memorial Coliseum; Los Angeles, CA	L 2–35	30,000	
November 19	Hardin–Simmons	Gilmore Stadium; Los Angeles, CA	L 0–19	6,000	
November 27	Gonzaga	Gilmore Stadium; Los Angeles, CA	W 20–19	7,000	
