= 1938 San Francisco Dons football team =

American college football season

1938 San Francisco Dons football
- Conference: Independent
- Record: 5–2–1
- Head coach: George Malley (2nd season)
- Home stadium: Kezar Stadium

1938 Western college football independents records
	Conf.			Overall
Team	W	L	T	W		L		T
San Jose State		–		11	–	1	–	0
Cal Poly		–		7	–	2	–	0
Santa Clara		–		6	–	2	–	0
Saint Mary's		–		6	–	2	–	0
San Francisco		–		5	–	2	–	1
Humboldt State		–		4	–	2	–	0
Idaho Southern Branch		–		4	–	3	–	0
Portland		–		5	–	3	–	0
Hawaii		–		4	–	4	–	0
Loyola (CA)		–		4	–	5	–	0
San Francisco State		–		2	–	5	–	0
La Verne		–		1	–	4	–	0
Santa Barbara State		–		2	–	8	–	0
Gonzaga		–		1	–	7	–	0

The 1938 San Francisco Dons football team was an American football team that represented the University of San Francisco as an independent during the 1938 college football season. In their second season under head coach George Malley, the Dons compiled a 5–2–1 record and outscored their opponents by a combined total of 93 to 26.

== Schedule ==
Date	Opponent	Site	Result	Attendance	Source
September 18	St. Mary's (TX)	Kezar Stadium; San Francisco	W 31–0		
September 23	Hardin–Simmons	Seals Stadium; San Francisco	W 20–0	6,500	
September 30	Montana	Seals Stadium; San Francisco	T 0–0	10,000	
October 7	Santa Barbara State	Seals Stadium; San Francisco	W 14–0		
October 23	Saint Mary's	Kezar Stadium; San Francisco	L 6–13	20,000	
November 6	No. 8 Santa Clara	Kezar Stadium; San Francisco	L 0–7		
November 12	Fresno State	Fresno State College Stadium; Fresno, CA	W 14–6	4,936	
November 20	at Gonzaga	Gonzaga Stadium; Spokane, WA	W 8–0		
Rankings from AP Poll released prior to the game
