= 1938 Pacific Tigers football team =

American college football season

1938 Pacific Tigers football

FWC champion
- Conference: Far Western Conference
- Record: 7–3 (4–0 FWC)
- Head coach: Amos Alonzo Stagg (6th season)
- Home stadium: Baxter Stadium

1938 Far Western Conference football standings
	Conf.					Overall
Team	W		L		T	W		L		T
Pacific (CA) $	4	–	0	–	0	7	–	3	–	0
Fresno State	2	–	1	–	0	7	–	3	–	0
Nevada	1	–	2	–	0	2	–	3	–	1
Chico State	0	–	2	–	1	2	–	5	–	1
Cal Aggies	0	–	2	–	1	2	–	6	–	1
$ – Conference champion

The 1938 Pacific Tigers football team represented the College of the Pacific—now known as the University of the Pacific—in Stockton, California as a member of the Far Western Conference (FWC) during the 1938 college football season. Led by sixth-year head coach Amos Alonzo Stagg, Pacific compiled an overall record of 7–3 with a mark of 4–0 in conference play, winning the FWC title. The team outscored its opponents 203 to 103 for the season. The Tigers played home games at Baxter Stadium in Stockton.

== Schedule ==
Date	Opponent	Site	Result	Attendance	Source
September 30	at Loyola (CA)*	Gilmore Stadium; Los Angeles, CA	L 0–7	17,000	
October 8	at California*	California Memorial Stadium; Berkeley, CA	L 0–39		
October 13	California JV*	Baxter Stadium; Stockton, CA	W 28–0		
October 21	at San Jose State*	Spartan Stadium; San Jose, CA (rivalry)	L 6–19		
October 28	Nevada^{†}	Baxter Stadium; Stockton, CA	W 51–0	5,000	
November 4	at Fresno State	Fresno State College Stadium; Fresno, CA	W 18–13	9,000	
November 12	at Chicago*	Stagg Field Stadium (Note: This stadium was built in 1893 and stayed open until 1957. It is the predecessor to the current Stagg Field, which was first used for football in the 1963 season.); Chicago, IL	W 32–0	10,000	
November 18	Cal Aggies	Baxter Stadium; Stockton, CA	W 34–6		
November 24	at Chico State	College Field; Chico, CA	W 20–13		
December 1	at San Diego Marines (Note: The Marine Corps Recruit Depot (MCRD) in San Diego fielded a team that played against colleges and other military teams from 1922 to 1964.)*	Balboa Stadium?; San Diego, CA	W 14–6		
*Non-conference game; ^{†}Homecoming

== Team players in the NFL ==
No College of the Pacific players were selected in the 1939 NFL draft.

The following finished their Pacific career in 1938, were not drafted, but played in the NFL.

Player	Position	First NFL team
Phil Martinovich	Fullback, guard	1939 Detroit Lions
