= 1938 Washington State Cougars football team =

American college football season

1938 Washington State Cougars football
- Conference: Pacific Coast Conference
- Record: 2–8 (1–7 PCC)
- Head coach: Babe Hollingbery (13th season)
- Home stadium: Rogers Field

1938 Pacific Coast Conference football standings
	Conf.					Overall
Team	W		L		T	W		L		T
No. 7 USC +	6	–	1	–	0	9	–	2	–	0
No. 14 California +	6	–	1	–	0	10	–	1	–	0
UCLA	4	–	3	–	1	7	–	4	–	1
Oregon State	4	–	3	–	1	5	–	3	–	1
Oregon	4	–	4	–	0	4	–	5	–	0
Washington	3	–	4	–	1	3	–	5	–	1
Idaho	2	–	3	–	1	6	–	3	–	1
Stanford	2	–	5	–	0	3	–	6	–	0
Washington State	1	–	7	–	0	2	–	8	–	0
Montana	0	–	1	–	0	5	–	3	–	1
+ – Conference co-champions; Rankings from AP Poll

The 1938 Washington State Cougars football team was an American football team that represented Washington State College in the Pacific Coast Conference (PCC) during the 1938 college football season. Thirteenth-year head coach Babe Hollingbery led the team to a 2–8 record (1–7 in PCC, ninth); they were outscored 159 to 44 and held scoreless four times.

The Cougars' three home games were played on campus at Rogers Field in Pullman, with a road game in nearby Moscow against Palouse rival Idaho, played in the snow.

== Schedule ==
Date	Opponent	Rank	Site	Result	Attendance	Source
September 24	Oregon		Rogers Field; Pullman, WA	L 2–10	6,000	
October 1	California		Rogers Field; Pullman, WA	L 3–27	10,000	
October 8	at Stanford		Stanford Stadium; Stanford, CA	L 0–8	5,000	
October 15	at USC		Los Angeles Memorial Coliseum; Los Angeles, CA	L 6–19	35,000	
October 22	at Oregon State		Multnomah Stadium; Portland, OR	L 6–7	10,000	
October 29	at Gonzaga*		Gonzaga Stadium; Spokane, WA	W 15–13	9,000	
November 5	UCLA		Rogers Field; Pullman, WA	L 0–21	8,000	
November 12	at Idaho		Neale Stadium; Moscow, ID (rivalry)	W 12–0	7,000	
November 26	at Washington		Husky Stadium; Seattle, WA (rivalry)	L 0–26	20,000	
December 3	at Oklahoma*	No. 5	Memorial Stadium; Norman, OK	L 0–28	15,000	
*Non-conference game; Rankings from AP Poll released prior to the game; Source:
