= 1938 Santa Clara Broncos football team =

American college football season

1938 Santa Clara Broncos football
- Conference: Independent
- Record: 6–2
- Head coach: Buck Shaw (3rd season)
- Home stadium: Kezar Stadium

1938 Western college football independents records
	Conf.			Overall
Team	W	L	T	W		L		T
San Jose State		–		11	–	1	–	0
Cal Poly		–		7	–	2	–	0
Santa Clara		–		6	–	2	–	0
Saint Mary's		–		6	–	2	–	0
San Francisco		–		5	–	2	–	1
Humboldt State		–		4	–	2	–	0
Idaho Southern Branch		–		4	–	3	–	0
Portland		–		5	–	3	–	0
Hawaii		–		4	–	4	–	0
Loyola (CA)		–		4	–	5	–	0
San Francisco State		–		2	–	5	–	0
La Verne		–		1	–	4	–	0
Santa Barbara State		–		2	–	8	–	0
Gonzaga		–		1	–	7	–	0

The 1938 Santa Clara Broncos football team was an American football team that represented Santa Clara University as an independent during the 1938 college football season. In their third season under head coach Buck Shaw, the Broncos compiled a 6–2 record and outscored opponents by a total of 97 to 26. They were ranked as high as No. 5 in the AP Poll before losing the last two games of the season.

Santa Clara tackle Alvord Wolff was a consensus first-team selection for the 1938 College Football All-America Team. Wolff was selected by the Chicago Cardinals with the 16th overall pick of the 1939 NFL Draft.

== Schedule ==
Date	Time	Opponent	Rank	Site	Result	Attendance	Source
October 1		at Stanford		Stanford Stadium; Stanford, CA	W 22–0	50,000	
October 8		Texas A&M		Kezar Stadium; San Francisco, CA	W 7–0	35,000	
October 15		vs. Arizona		Phoenix Union High School Stadium; Phoenix, AZ	W 27–0	13,000	
October 22		Arkansas	No. 6	Kezar Stadium; San Francisco, CA	W 21–6		
October 29		at Michigan State	No. 5	Macklin Field; East Lansing, MI	W 7–6		
November 6		vs. San Francisco	No. 8	Kezar Stadium; San Francisco, CA	W 7–0	30,000	
November 13		vs. Saint Mary's	No. 8	Kezar Stadium; San Francisco, CA	L 0–7	60,000	
November 27	2:00 p.m.	vs. Detroit	No. 19	Sacramento Stadium; Sacramento, CA	L 6–7	16,000	
Rankings from AP Poll released prior to the game; All times are in Pacific time

== After the season ==
=== NFL draft ===
The following Broncos were selected in the 1939 NFL draft following the season.

Round	Pick	Player	Position	NFL team
3	16	Alvord Wolff	Tackle	Chicago Cardinals
6	50	Jerry Ginney	Guard	New York Giants
12	107	Jim Coughlan	End	Detroit Lions
15	131	Russ Clarke	Guard	Chicago Cardinals
22	199	Bill Gunther	Back	Green Bay Packers
