= 1938 Idaho Southern Branch Bengals football team =

American college football season

1938 Idaho Southern Branch Bengals football
- Conference: Independent
- Record: 4–3
- Head coach: Guy Wicks (4th season)
- Captain: Newell Berg (Note: Berg later attended and played football for Montana State; he was killed in action in July 1944 while serving in the United States Marine Corps.)
- Home stadium: Spud Bowl

1938 Western college football independents records
	Conf.			Overall
Team	W	L	T	W		L		T
San Jose State		–		11	–	1	–	0
Cal Poly		–		7	–	2	–	0
Santa Clara		–		6	–	2	–	0
Saint Mary's		–		6	–	2	–	0
San Francisco		–		5	–	2	–	1
Humboldt State		–		4	–	2	–	0
Idaho Southern Branch		–		4	–	3	–	0
Portland		–		5	–	3	–	0
Hawaii		–		4	–	4	–	0
Loyola (CA)		–		4	–	5	–	0
San Francisco State		–		2	–	5	–	0
La Verne		–		1	–	4	–	0
Santa Barbara State		–		2	–	8	–	0
Gonzaga		–		1	–	7	–	0

The 1938 Idaho Southern Branch Bengals football team was an American football team that represented the University of Idaho, Southern Branch (later renamed Idaho State University) as an independent during the 1938 college football season. In their fourth season under head coach Guy Wicks, the team compiled a 4–3 record and outscored opponents by a total of 131 to 40.

== Schedule ==
Date	Opponent	Site	Result	Attendance	Source
October 8	Western State (CO)	Spud Bowl; Pocatello, ID	L 6–7		
October 15 (Note: The October 15 game in Sun Valley was attended by Governor of Idaho Barzilla W. Clark and actor Gary Cooper.)	vs. Chaffey	Sun Valley, ID	W 26–0	800	
October 21	Boise Junior College	Spud Bowl; Pocatello, ID	W 54–0		
November 5 (Note: The November 5 game was played in rain.)	Albion Normal (Note: Albion Normal is listed in some sources as Southern Idaho, a name adopted in 1947.)	Spud Bowl; Pocatello, ID	L 7–12		
November 11	vs. College of Idaho	Gooding High School; Gooding, ID	W 22–0	1,000	
November 18	Montana State^{†}	Spud Bowl; Pocatello, ID	W 16–0		
November 24	at Cal Poly	Mustang Stadium; San Luis Obispo, CA	L 0–21		
^{†}Homecoming
