= 1938 Stanford Indians football team =

American college football season

1938 Stanford Indians football
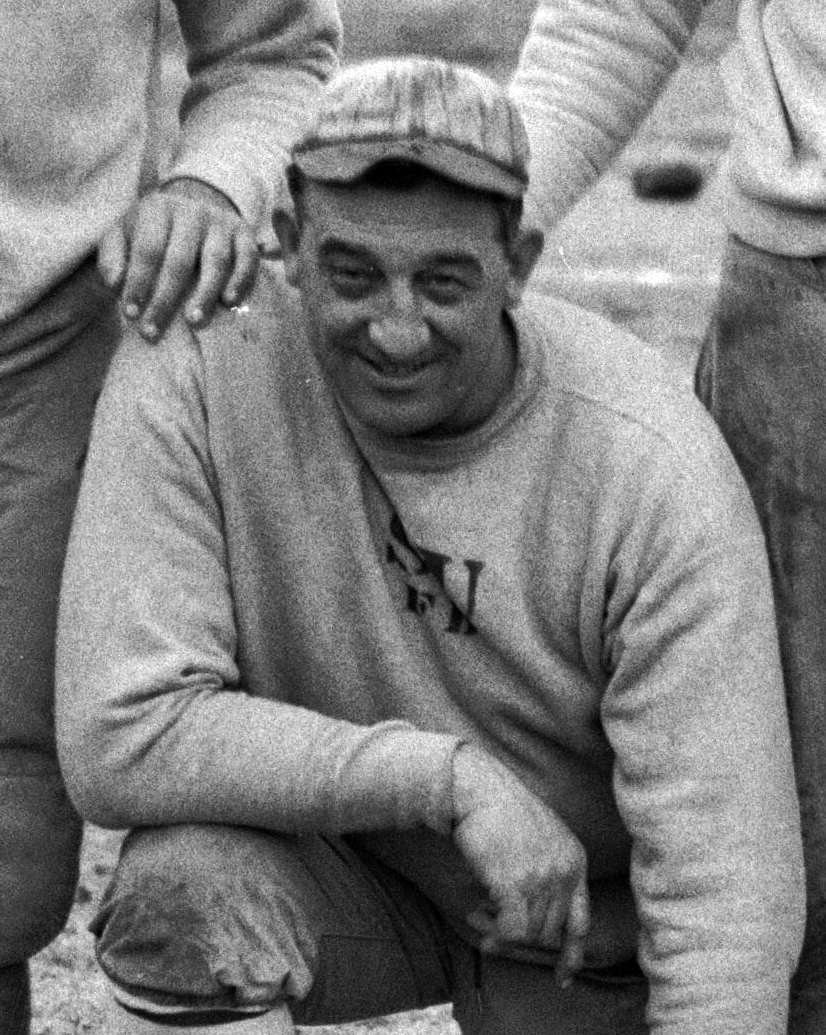
- Head coach Tiny Thornhill
- Conference: Pacific Coast Conference
- Record: 3–6 (2–5 PCC)
- Head coach: Tiny Thornhill (6th season)
- Home stadium: Stanford Stadium

1938 Pacific Coast Conference football standings
	Conf.					Overall
Team	W		L		T	W		L		T
No. 7 USC +	6	–	1	–	0	9	–	2	–	0
No. 14 California +	6	–	1	–	0	10	–	1	–	0
UCLA	4	–	3	–	1	7	–	4	–	1
Oregon State	4	–	3	–	1	5	–	3	–	1
Oregon	4	–	4	–	0	4	–	5	–	0
Washington	3	–	4	–	1	3	–	5	–	1
Idaho	2	–	3	–	1	6	–	3	–	1
Stanford	2	–	5	–	0	3	–	6	–	0
Washington State	1	–	7	–	0	2	–	8	–	0
Montana	0	–	1	–	0	5	–	3	–	1
+ – Conference co-champions; Rankings from AP Poll

The 1938 Stanford Indians football team represented Stanford University as a member of the Pacific Coast Conference (PCC) during the 1938 college football season. Led by sixth-year head coach Tiny Thornhill, the Indians compiled an overall record of 3–6 with a mark of 2–5 in conference play, placing eighth in the PCC. The team played home games at Stanford Stadium in Stanford, California.

== Schedule ==
Date	Opponent	Site	Result	Attendance	Source
October 1	Santa Clara*	Stanford Stadium; Stanford, CA	L 0–22	50,000	
October 8	Washington State	Stanford Stadium; Stanford, CA	W 8–0	5,000	
October 15	Oregon	Stanford Stadium; Stanford, CA	W 27–16		
October 22	USC	Stanford Stadium; Stanford, CA (rivalry)	L 2–13	35,000	
October 29	at UCLA	Los Angeles Memorial Coliseum; Los Angeles, CA	L 0–6	37,000	
November 5	Washington	Stanford Stadium; Stanford, CA	L 7–10	22,000	
November 12	at Oregon State	Bell Field; Corvallis, OR	L 0–6	10,000	
November 19	at No. 9 California	California Memorial Stadium; Berkeley, CA (Big Game)	L 0–6	81,000	
November 26	No. 13 Dartmouth*	Stanford Stadium; Stanford, CA	W 23–13	18,000	
*Non-conference game; Rankings from AP Poll released prior to the game; Source:

== Players drafted by the NFL ==
Player	Position	Round	Pick	NFL club
Pete Zagar	Tackle	8	70	New York Giants
Tony Calvelli	Center	11	97	Detroit Lions
Bill Paulman	Back	19	180	New York Giants
