= 1938 Santa Barbara State Gauchos football team =

American college football season

1938 Santa Barbara State Gauchos football
- Conference: Independent
- Record: 2–8
- Head coach: Spud Harder (4th season)
- Home stadium: La Playa Stadium

1938 Western college football independents records
	Conf.			Overall
Team	W	L	T	W		L		T
San Jose State		–		11	–	1	–	0
Cal Poly		–		7	–	2	–	0
Santa Clara		–		6	–	2	–	0
Saint Mary's		–		6	–	2	–	0
San Francisco		–		5	–	2	–	1
Humboldt State		–		4	–	2	–	0
Idaho Southern Branch		–		4	–	3	–	0
Portland		–		5	–	3	–	0
Hawaii		–		4	–	4	–	0
Loyola (CA)		–		4	–	5	–	0
San Francisco State		–		2	–	5	–	0
La Verne		–		1	–	4	–	0
Santa Barbara State		–		2	–	8	–	0
Gonzaga		–		1	–	7	–	0

The 1938 Santa Barbara State Gauchos football team represented Santa Barbara State (Note: University of California, Santa Barbara was known as Santa Barbara State College from 1921 to 1943.) as an independent during the 1938 college football season. The following year, the Gauchos and San Diego State join Fresno State and San Jose State as charter members of the California Collegiate Athletic Association (CCAA).

The Gauchos were led by fifth-year head coach Theodore "Spud" Harder and played home games at La Playa Stadium in Santa Barbara, California. They finished the season with a record of two wins and eight losses (2–8, 0–3 SCIAC). Overall, the team was outscored by its opponents 47–109 for the season. That included the Gauchos being shut out in six of the ten games.

== Schedule ==
Date	Opponent	Site	Result	Attendance	Source
September 23	Occidental	La Playa Stadium; Santa Barbara, CA	L 0–6		
September 30	at Colorado State–Greeley	Jackson Field; Greeley, CO	W 13–0		
October 7	at San Francisco	Kezar Stadium; San Francisco, CA	L 0–14		
October 14	Willamette	La Playa Stadium; Santa Barbara, CA	L 3–6		
October 21	Whittier	La Playa Stadium; Santa Barbara, CA	L 0–3		
October 29	at Arizona State	Goodwin Stadium; Tempe, AZ	L 0–10		
November 5	San Jose State	La Playa Stadium; Santa Barbara, CA	L 0–20		
November 12	Cal Aggies	La Playa Stadium; Santa Barbara, CA	W 18–6		
November 19	San Diego State	La Playa Stadium; Santa Barbara, CA	L 13–16		
November 24	at Fresno State	Fresno State College Stadium; Fresno, California	L 0–28	6,756	

== Team players in the NFL ==
The following Santa Barbara Gaucho players were selected in the 1939 NFL draft.

Player	Position	Round	Overall	NFL team
Doug Oldershaw	Guard, end	11	98	New York Giants
