= 1938 Cal Poly Mustangs football team =

American college football season

1938 Cal Poly Mustangs football
- Conference: Independent
- Record: 7–2
- Head coach: Howie O'Daniels (6th season)
- Home stadium: Mustang Stadium

1938 Western college football independents records
	Conf.			Overall
Team	W	L	T	W		L		T
San Jose State		–		11	–	1	–	0
Cal Poly		–		7	–	2	–	0
Santa Clara		–		6	–	2	–	0
Saint Mary's		–		6	–	2	–	0
San Francisco		–		5	–	2	–	1
Humboldt State		–		4	–	2	–	0
Idaho Southern Branch		–		4	–	3	–	0
Portland		–		5	–	3	–	0
Hawaii		–		4	–	4	–	0
Loyola (CA)		–		4	–	5	–	0
San Francisco State		–		2	–	5	–	0
La Verne		–		1	–	4	–	0
Santa Barbara State		–		2	–	8	–	0
Gonzaga		–		1	–	7	–	0

The 1938 Cal Poly Mustangs football team represented California Polytechnic School—now known as California Polytechnic State University, San Luis Obispo—as an independent during the 1938 college football season. Led by sixth-year head coach Howie O'Daniels, Cal Poly compiled a record of 7–2. The team outscored its opponents 119 to 53 for the season. The Mustangs played home games at Mustang Stadium in San Luis Obispo, California.

Cal Poly was a two-year school until 1941 and competed as an independent from 1929 to 1945.

== Schedule ==
Date	Opponent	Site	Result	Source
September 21	St. Mary's (TX)	Mustang Stadium; San Luis Obispo, CA	W 6–0	
October 1	Chico State	Mustang Stadium; San Luis Obispo, CA	W 14–7	
October 8	at Arizona State	Goodwin Stadium; Tempe, AZ	L 0–13	
October 15	at Humboldt State	Albee Stadium; Eureka, CA	W 13–6	
October 21	at San Francisco State	Roberts Field; San Francisco, CA	W 20–2	
October 28	at San Diego Marines (Note: The Marine Corps Recruit Depot (MCRD) in San Diego fielded a team that played against colleges and other military teams from 1922 to 1964.)	San Diego, CA	L 0–19	
November 5	San Jose State freshmen	Mustang Stadium; San Luis Obispo, CA	W 26–0	
November 11	San Francisco freshmen	Mustang Stadium; San Luis Obispo, CA	W 19–6	
November 24	Idaho Southern Branch	Mustang Stadium; San Luis Obispo, CA	W 21–0	
