= 1938 Portland Pilots football team =

American college football season

1938 Portland Pilots football
- Conference: Independent
- Record: 5–3
- Head coach: Robert L. Mathews (2nd season)
- Home stadium: Multnomah Stadium

1938 Western college football independents records
	Conf.			Overall
Team	W	L	T	W		L		T
San Jose State		–		11	–	1	–	0
Cal Poly		–		7	–	2	–	0
Santa Clara		–		6	–	2	–	0
Saint Mary's		–		6	–	2	–	0
San Francisco		–		5	–	2	–	1
Humboldt State		–		4	–	2	–	0
Idaho Southern Branch		–		4	–	3	–	0
Portland		–		5	–	3	–	0
Hawaii		–		4	–	4	–	0
Loyola (CA)		–		4	–	5	–	0
San Francisco State		–		2	–	5	–	0
La Verne		–		1	–	4	–	0
Santa Barbara State		–		2	–	8	–	0
Gonzaga		–		1	–	7	–	0

The 1938 Portland Pilots football team was an American football team that represented the University of Portland as an independent during the 1938 college football season. In its second year under head coach Robert L. Mathews, the team compiled a 5–3 record. The team played its home games at Multnomah Stadium in Portland, Oregon.

== Schedule ==
Date	Opponent	Site	Result	Attendance	Source
September 24	at Pacific (OR)	Multnomah Stadium; Portland, OR	W 26–6		
September 30	Willamette	Multnomah Stadium; Portland, OR	W 12–7		
October 8	at Oregon State	Bell Field; Corvallis, OR	L 0–19		
October 16	at Saint Mary's	Kezar Stadium; San Francisco, CA	L 7–32	8,000	
October 22	at BYU	Provo, UT	W 6–3		
October 29	vs. Montana State	Butte High Stadium; Butte, MT	L 12–20		
November 4	at Saint Martin's	Olympia, WA	W 6–0		
November 12	Puget Sound	Multnomah Stadium; Portland, OR	W 38–6		
