= Slip Madigan =

American football player and coach (1896–1966)

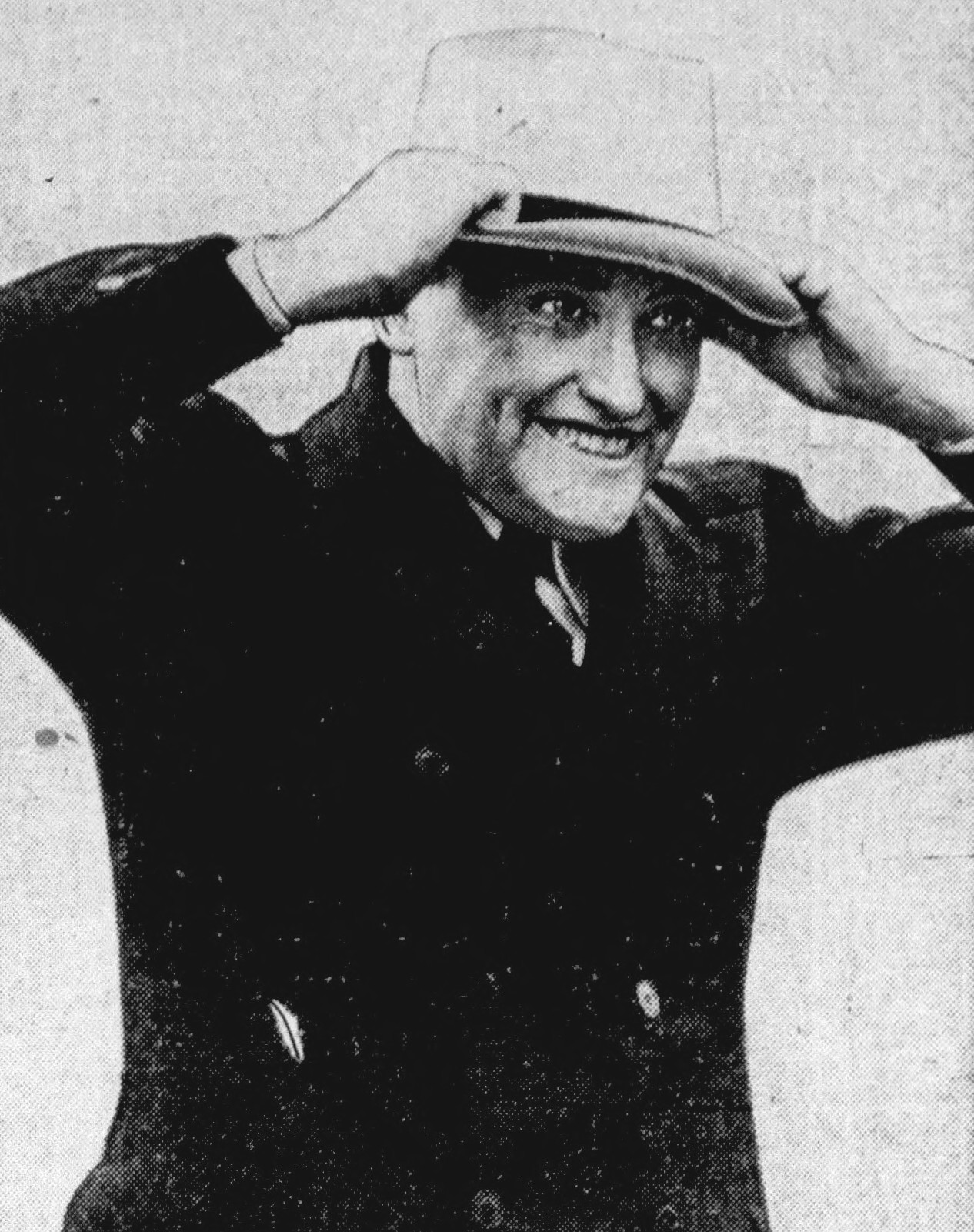
- Madigan, circa 1945

Biographical details
- Born: November 18, 1896; Ottawa, Illinois, U.S.
- Died: October 10, 1966 (aged 69); Oakland, California, U.S.

Playing career

Football
- 1916–1917: Notre Dame
- 1919: Notre Dame
- Position: Center

Coaching career (HC unless noted)

Football
- 1920: Columbia (OR)
- 1921–1939: Saint Mary's
- 1943–1944: Iowa

Basketball
- 1921–1927: Saint Mary's

Baseball
- 1926–1930: Saint Mary's

Administrative career (AD unless noted)
- 1946: Los Angeles Dons (GM)

Head coaching record
- Overall: 119–58–13 (football); 38–33 (basketball); 30–31 (baseball)
- Bowls: 1–0

Accomplishments and honors

Championships
- Football; 4 FWC (1925–1928)
- College Football Hall of Fame; Inducted in 1974 (profile)

Edward Patrick "Slip" Madigan (November 18, 1896 – October 10, 1966) was an American college football player and coach of college football, college basketball, and college baseball. He served as the head football coach at Saint Mary's College of California from 1921 to 1939 and at the University of Iowa from 1943 to 1944, compiling a career college football head coaching record of 119–58–13. Madigan was also the head basketball coach at Saint Mary's from 1921 to 1927 and the head baseball coach at the school from 1926 to 1930. He played football at the University of Notre Dame as a center. Madigan was inducted into the College Football Hall of Fame as a coach in 1974.

== Playing and coaching career ==
Madigan played college football for Knute Rockne at the University of Notre Dame, playing center. After his playing days, he took over a floundering football program at Saint Mary's College of California in Moraga, California in 1921. In their final game in 1920, the Gaels lost to California, 127–0. Madigan immediately recruited sixty men and taught them Notre Dame's plays and some tricks of his own, including the "forward fumble."

By 1927, Saint Mary's developed into one of the strongest football programs on the West Coast. They defeated the USC, UCLA, California, and Stanford. The Stanford team they defeated in 1927 went on to play in the Rose Bowl, as did the USC team they defeated in 1931. Although the school's enrollment seldom exceeded 500, the Galloping Gaels became a nationally known football power.

The most notable win came in 1930, when Saint Mary's traveled to New York City to play Fordham. Fordham was a heavy favorite, as the Rams had won 16 straight games going back to 1928. They featured the first version of a defense known as the "Seven Blocks of Granite," a formidable unit that later would include Vince Lombardi. Saint Mary's recovered from a 12–0 halftime deficit to win, 20–12.

The Gaels were known for their flashy style that reflected the personality of their flamboyant coach. Madigan traveled to New York for the Fordham game with 150 fans on a train that was labeled "the world's longest bar." To stir up publicity for the game, he threw a party the night before and invited not only sportswriters but such celebrities as Babe Ruth and New York mayor Jimmy Walker.

After the 1938 season, Saint Mary's was invited to the Cotton Bowl Classic, where they defeated Texas Tech, 20–13. After the 1939 season, however, the successful, but controversial Madigan was fired. He had a 117–45–12 record at the school. Saint Mary's never again came close to the football success they had under Madigan, and in 2004, the school dropped the sport.

Madigan was also the 16th football coach of the Iowa Hawkeyes, in 1943 and 1944. He was an interim coach for Eddie Anderson, who was serving in World War II. The University of Iowa at that time had to share its athletic facilities with a local military academy, and nearly all the able-bodied men in Iowa City found their way into the military school. Madigan's Iowa roster was mostly filled with players with conditions that exempted them from military service.

Nevertheless, he coached some good performances out of the 1943 Hawkeyes Although they had a record of just 1–6–1, they played respectably in losses. As a result, Madigan was retained in 1944. However, the 1944 season was similar to 1943, except the losses were by greater margins. Madigan suggested that he would be finished with coaching at the end of the year, which may have inspired Iowa to a 27–6 victory over Nebraska, but Iowa ended the season 1–7. Madigan turned down an offer to coach for Iowa again in 1945 and retired from coaching.

Madigan later served as the general manager of the Los Angeles Dons of the All-America Football Conference (AAFC) in 1946.

Madigan was a relative of Alameda County Sheriff Frank Madigan. Madigan died in 1966 and was inducted into the College Football Hall of Fame in 1974. He is buried at Saint Mary Cemetery in Oakland, California.

== Head coaching record ==
=== Football ===
Year	Team	Overall	Conference	Standing	Bowl/playoffs
Saint Mary's Saints (Independent) (1921–1924)
1921	Saint Mary's	4–3			
1922	Saint Mary's	3–6			
1923	Saint Mary's	5–3–1			
1924	Saint Mary's	9–1			
Saint Mary's Gaels (Northern California Athletic Conference) (1925–1928)
1925	Saint Mary's	8–2	3–0	1st	
1926	Saint Mary's	9–0–1	4–0	1st	
1927	Saint Mary's	7–2–1	3–0	1st	
1928	Saint Mary's	5–4	2–0	1st	
Saint Mary's Gaels (Independent) (1929–1939)
1929	Saint Mary's	8–0–1			
1930	Saint Mary's	8–1			
1931	Saint Mary's	8–2			
1932	Saint Mary's	6–2–1			
1933	Saint Mary's	6–3–1			
1934	Saint Mary's	7–2			
1935	Saint Mary's	5–2–2			
1936	Saint Mary's	6–3–1			
1937	Saint Mary's	4–3–2			
1938	Saint Mary's	6–2			W Cotton
1939	Saint Mary's	3–4–1			
Saint Mary's:		117–45–12	12–0		
Iowa Hawkeyes (Big Ten Conference) (1943–1944)
1943	Iowa	1–6–1	0–4–1	9th	
1944	Iowa	1–7	0–6	9th	
Iowa:		2–13–1	0–10–1		
Total:		119–58–13			
National championship Conference title Conference division title or championship game berth

== See also ==
- List of University of Notre Dame alumni
