= 1938 Oregon Webfoots football team =

American college football season

1938 Oregon Webfoots football
- Conference: Pacific Coast Conference
- Record: 4–5 (4–4 PCC)
- Head coach: Tex Oliver (1st season)
- Captain: None
- Home stadium: Hayward Field, Multnomah Stadium

1938 Pacific Coast Conference football standings
	Conf.					Overall
Team	W		L		T	W		L		T
No. 7 USC +	6	–	1	–	0	9	–	2	–	0
No. 14 California +	6	–	1	–	0	10	–	1	–	0
UCLA	4	–	3	–	1	7	–	4	–	1
Oregon State	4	–	3	–	1	5	–	3	–	1
Oregon	4	–	4	–	0	4	–	5	–	0
Washington	3	–	4	–	1	3	–	5	–	1
Idaho	2	–	3	–	1	6	–	3	–	1
Stanford	2	–	5	–	0	3	–	6	–	0
Washington State	1	–	7	–	0	2	–	8	–	0
Montana	0	–	1	–	0	5	–	3	–	1
+ – Conference co-champions; Rankings from AP Poll

The 1938 Oregon Webfoots football team represented the University of Oregon in the Pacific Coast Conference (PCC) during the 1938 college football season. In their first season under head coach Tex Oliver, the Webfoots compiled a 4–5 record (4–4 in PCC, fifth), and were outscored 138 to 69.

Home games were played on campus at Hayward Field in Eugene and at Multnomah Stadium in Portland.

== Schedule ==
Date	Opponent	Site	Result	Attendance	Source
September 24	at Washington State	Rogers Field; Pullman, WA	W 10–2	6,000	
October 1	UCLA	Hayward Field; Eugene, OR	W 14–12	7,500	
October 15	at Stanford	Stanford Stadium; Stanford, CA	L 16–27		
October 22	at No. 11 Fordham*	Polo Grounds; New York, NY	L 0–26	26,866	
October 29	No. 19 USC	Multnomah Stadium; Portland, OR	L 7–31	18,000	
November 5	Idaho	Hayward Field; Eugene, OR	W 19–6	8,000	
November 12	at No. 14 California	California Memorial Stadium; Berkeley, CA	L 0–20	35,000	
November 19	Washington	Multnomah Stadium; Portland, OR (rivalry)	W 3–0	19,000	
November 26	vs. Oregon State	Multnomah Stadium; Portland, OR (rivalry)	L 0–14	25,000	
*Non-conference game; Rankings from AP Poll released prior to the game; Source:
