= 1938 Montana State Bobcats football team =

American college football season

1938 Montana State Bobcats football

RMC champion
- Conference: Rocky Mountain Conference
- Record: 3–5–1 (1–0–1 RMC)
- Head coach: Schubert R. Dyche (9th season)
- Home stadium: Gatton Field

1938 Rocky Mountain Conference football standings
	Conf.					Overall
Team	W		L		T	W		L		T
Montana State $	1	–	0	–	1	3	–	5	–	1
Colorado Mines	2	–	1	–	0	4	–	3	–	0
Colorado State–Greeley	1	–	1	–	1	3	–	4	–	1
Colorado College	1	–	1	–	0	1	–	6	–	0
Western State (CO)	1	–	3	–	0	3	–	5	–	0
$ – Conference champion

The 1938 Montana State Bobcats football team was an American football team that represented Montana State College (later renamed Montana State University) in the Rocky Mountain Conference (RMC) during the 1938 college football season. In its ninth, non-consecutive season under head coach Schubert R. Dyche, the team compiled a 3–5–1 record (1–0–1 against RMC opponents) and won the conference championship.

Three Montana State players were selected as first-team players on the 1938 All-Rocky Mountain Conference football team: fullback Don Cosner and guards Max Kimberly and John Vollmer. End Dana Bradford was named to the second team.

== Schedule ==
Date	Opponent	Site	Result	Attendance	Source
September 17	at Texas Tech*	Tech Field; Lubbock, TX	L 0–35	7,500	
September 23	at New Mexico A&M*	Quesenberry Field; Las Cruces, NM	L 7–27		
October 1	at Utah*	Ute Stadium; Salt Lake City, UT	L 0–34	7,883	
October 8	Omaha*	Gatton Field; Bozeman, MT	W 14–7		
October 15	Western State (CO)^{†}	Gatton Field; Bozeman, MT	W 10–0		
October 29	vs. Portland*	Butte High Stadium; Butte, MT	W 20–0		
November 12	vs. Montana*	Butte High Stadium; Butte, MT (rivalry)	L 0–13	7,000	
November 18	at Idaho Southern Branch*	Spud Bowl; Pocatello, ID	L 0–16		
November 24	Colorado State–Greeley	Gatton Field; Bozeman, MT	T 0–0		
*Non-conference game; ^{†}Homecoming
