= 1938 Humboldt State Lumberjacks football team =

American college football season

1938 Humboldt State Lumberjacks football
- Conference: Independent
- Record: 4–2
- Head coach: Herbert L. Hart (1st season)
- Home stadium: Albee Stadium

1938 Western college football independents records
	Conf.			Overall
Team	W	L	T	W		L		T
San Jose State		–		11	–	1	–	0
Cal Poly		–		7	–	2	–	0
Santa Clara		–		6	–	2	–	0
Saint Mary's		–		6	–	2	–	0
San Francisco		–		5	–	2	–	1
Humboldt State		–		4	–	2	–	0
Idaho Southern Branch		–		4	–	3	–	0
Portland		–		5	–	3	–	0
Hawaii		–		4	–	4	–	0
Loyola (CA)		–		4	–	5	–	0
San Francisco State		–		2	–	5	–	0
La Verne		–		1	–	4	–	0
Santa Barbara State		–		2	–	8	–	0
Gonzaga		–		1	–	7	–	0

The 1938 Humboldt State Lumberjacks football team represented Humboldt State College—now known as California State Polytechnic University, Humboldt—as an independent during the 1938 college football season. Led by first-year head coach Herbert L. Hart, the Lumberjacks compiled a record of 4–2 and were outscored by their opponents 86 to 76 for the season. The team played home games at Albee Stadium in Eureka, California.

== Schedule ==
Date	Time	Opponent	Site	Result	Attendance	Source
October 1	8:30 p.m.	Southern Oregon Normal	Albee Stadium; Eureka, CA	W 18–7	2,000	
October 7		at San Jose State	Spartan Stadium; San Jose, CA	L 0–48	7,500	
October 15		Cal Poly	Albee Stadium; Eureka, CA	L 6–13		
October 23		Saint Mary's freshmen	Albee Stadium; Eureka, CA	W 19–0		
October 29		at Chico State	Chico High School Stadium; Chico, CA	W 13–6		
November 5		Oregon College	Albee Stadium; Eureka, CA	W 20–12		
All times are in Pacific time
