= 1938 Cal Aggies football team =

American college football season

1938 Cal Aggies football
- Conference: Far Western Conference
- Record: 2–6–1 (0–2–1 FWC)
- Head coach: Vern Hickey (2nd season)
- Captain: Howard McSweeney
- Home stadium: A Street field

1938 Far Western Conference football standings
	Conf.					Overall
Team	W		L		T	W		L		T
Pacific (CA) $	4	–	0	–	0	7	–	3	–	0
Fresno State	2	–	1	–	0	7	–	3	–	0
Nevada	1	–	2	–	0	2	–	3	–	1
Chico State	0	–	2	–	1	2	–	5	–	1
Cal Aggies	0	–	2	–	1	2	–	6	–	1
$ – Conference champion

The 1938 Cal Aggies football team represented the College of Agriculture at Davis—now known as the University of California, Davis—as a member of the Far Western Conference (FWC) during the 1938 college football season. Led by second-year head coach Vern Hickey, the Aggies compiled an overall record of 2–6–1 with a mark of 0–2–1 in conference play, tying for fourth place in the FWC. The team was outscored by its opponents 174 to 58 for the season. The Cal Aggies played home games at A Street field on campus in Davis, California.

== Schedule ==
Date	Time	Opponent	Site	Result	Attendance	Source
September 24		vs. Whittier*	Sacramento Stadium; Sacramento, CA	L 6–27		
October 1		San Francisco State*	A Street field; Davis, CA	W 20–0	1,000	
October 8		at California*	California Memorial Stadium; Berkeley, CA	L 0–48		
October 17	8:15 p.m.	at Sacramento*	Sacramento Stadium; Sacramento, CA	W 10–0	4,737	
October 22		at Chico State	Chico High School Stadium; Chico, CA	T 0–0		
October 29		at Fresno State	Fresno State College Stadium; Fresno, CA	L 7–34	3,209	
November 5		Nevada*	A Street field; Davis, CA	Cancelled		
November 5		California JV (Note: The University of California JV team was commonly known as the "Cal Ramblers".)*	A Street field; Davis, CA	L 3–13		
November 12		at Santa Barbara State*	La Playa Stadium; Santa Barbara, CA	L 6–18		
November 18		at Pacific (CA)	Baxter Stadium; Stockton, CA	L 6–34		
*Non-conference game; All times are in Pacific time
