= 1938 Montana Grizzlies football team =

American college football season

1938 Montana Grizzlies football
- Conference: Pacific Coast Conference
- Record: 5–3–1 (0–1 PCC)
- Head coach: Doug Fessenden (4th season)
- Home stadium: Dornblaser Field

1938 Pacific Coast Conference football standings
	Conf.					Overall
Team	W		L		T	W		L		T
No. 7 USC +	6	–	1	–	0	9	–	2	–	0
No. 14 California +	6	–	1	–	0	10	–	1	–	0
UCLA	4	–	3	–	1	7	–	4	–	1
Oregon State	4	–	3	–	1	5	–	3	–	1
Oregon	4	–	4	–	0	4	–	5	–	0
Washington	3	–	4	–	1	3	–	5	–	1
Idaho	2	–	3	–	1	6	–	3	–	1
Stanford	2	–	5	–	0	3	–	6	–	0
Washington State	1	–	7	–	0	2	–	8	–	0
Montana	0	–	1	–	0	5	–	3	–	1
+ – Conference co-champions; Rankings from AP Poll

The 1938 Montana Grizzlies football team represented the University of Montana in the 1938 college football season as a member of the Pacific Coast Conference (PCC). Led by fourth-year head coach Doug Fessenden, they played their home games on campus in Missoula at Dornblaser Field. The Grizzlies finished the season with an overall record of 5–3–1, and were 0–1 in PCC play.

Late October marked the 25th game with conference rival Idaho and the first for the Little Brown Stein trophy. With the 19–6 win in Missoula on homecoming, Idaho extended its series advantage over the Grizzlies to 19–5–1 (.780).

== Schedule ==
Date	Opponent	Site	Result	Attendance	Source
September 24	Eastern Washington*	Dornblaser Field; Missoula, MT (rivalry)	W 27–0		
September 30	at San Francisco*	Kezar Stadium; San Francisco, CA	T 0–0	10,000	
October 8	DePaul*	Dornblaser Field; Missoula, MT	W 7–6		
October 15	Texas Tech*	Dornblaser Field; Missoula, MT	L 13–19	8,000	
October 22	at North Dakota*	Memorial Stadium; Grand Forks, ND	L 0–7	7,000	
October 29	Idaho^{†}	Dornblaser Field; Missoula, MT (Little Brown Stein)	L 6–19	8,000	
November 5	at Gonzaga*	Gonzaga Stadium; Spokane, WA	W 9–0		
November 12	vs. Montana State*	Butte High Stadium; Butte, MT (rivalry)	W 13–0	7,000	
November 24	at Arizona*	Arizona Stadium; Tucson, AZ	W 7–0	9,000	
*Non-conference game; ^{†}Homecoming; Source:

- The Governors Cup game included Montana for the first time sixty years later in 1998;
  it began in 1984, between Eastern Washington and Idaho.

== After the season ==
The following Grizzlies were selected in the 1939 NFL draft after the season.

Round	Pick	Player	Position	NFL club
16	147	Bill Lazetich	Back	Detroit Lions
21	191	Aldo Forte	Tackle	Chicago Bears
