= 1938 Oregon State Beavers football team =

American college football season

1938 Oregon State Beavers football
- Conference: Pacific Coast Conference
- Record: 5–3–1 (4–3–1 PCC)
- Head coach: Lon Stiner (6th a season)
- Home stadium: Bell Field

1938 Pacific Coast Conference football standings
	Conf.					Overall
Team	W		L		T	W		L		T
No. 7 USC +	6	–	1	–	0	9	–	2	–	0
No. 14 California +	6	–	1	–	0	10	–	1	–	0
UCLA	4	–	3	–	1	7	–	4	–	1
Oregon State	4	–	3	–	1	5	–	3	–	1
Oregon	4	–	4	–	0	4	–	5	–	0
Washington	3	–	4	–	1	3	–	5	–	1
Idaho	2	–	3	–	1	6	–	3	–	1
Stanford	2	–	5	–	0	3	–	6	–	0
Washington State	1	–	7	–	0	2	–	8	–	0
Montana	0	–	1	–	0	5	–	3	–	1
+ – Conference co-champions; Rankings from AP Poll

The 1938 Oregon State Beavers football team season represented Oregon State College in the Pacific Coast Conference (PCC) during the 1938 college football season. In their sixth season under head coach Lon Stiner, the Beavers compiled a 5–3–1 record (4–3–1 against PCC opponents), finished in a tie for third place in the PCC, and outscored their opponents, 72 to 51. The team played its home games at Bell Field in Corvallis, Oregon and Multnomah Stadium in Portland.

Coming into the 1938 season, Oregon State College head football coach Lon Stiner was forced with the task of replacing virtually his entire starting backfield, having lost three of the previous year's regulars to graduation. Twenty newcomers were added to the varsity squad for the 1938 campaign, who were brought up to speed over the course of 30 spring practices.

The 1938 OSC squad finished the season with a ranking of #33 nationally.

== Schedule ==
Date	Opponent	Site	Result	Attendance	Source
September 24	Idaho	Bell Field; Corvallis, OR	L 0–13	4,000	
October 1	at USC	Los Angeles Memorial Coliseum; Los Angeles, CA	L 0–7	35,000	
October 8	Portland*	Bell Field; Corvallis, OR	W 19–0		
October 15	at Washington	Husky Stadium; Seattle, WA	W 13–6	20,000	
October 22	Washington State	Multnomah Stadium; Portland, OR	W 7–6	10,000	
October 29	at California	California Memorial Stadium; Berkeley, CA	L 7–13	25,000	
November 12	Stanford	Bell Field; Corvallis, OR	W 6–0	10,000	
November 26	vs. Oregon	Multnomah Stadium; Portland, OR (rivalry)	W 14–0	25,000	
December 10	at UCLA	Los Angeles Memorial Coliseum; Los Angeles, CA	T 6–6	10,000	
*Non-conference game

== 1938 cumulative statistics ==
Source: Bud Forrester (ed.), 1939 Oregon State Football Information, pg. 9.

	Oregon State	Opponents
Points scored	72	51
Total yards gained	1,771	2,141
Total plays	423	438
First downs	87	108
Passing	43-106 (40.6%)	47-119 (39.5%)
Passing yards	490 (11.4 ave.)	681 (14.5 ave.)
Interceptions thrown	15	14
Fumble recoveries	16	30
Penalties	20–140	25-221
Punts-Average	81–35.8	73–36.0
