= 1939 Cotton Bowl Classic =

- 3rd Cotton Bowl Classic
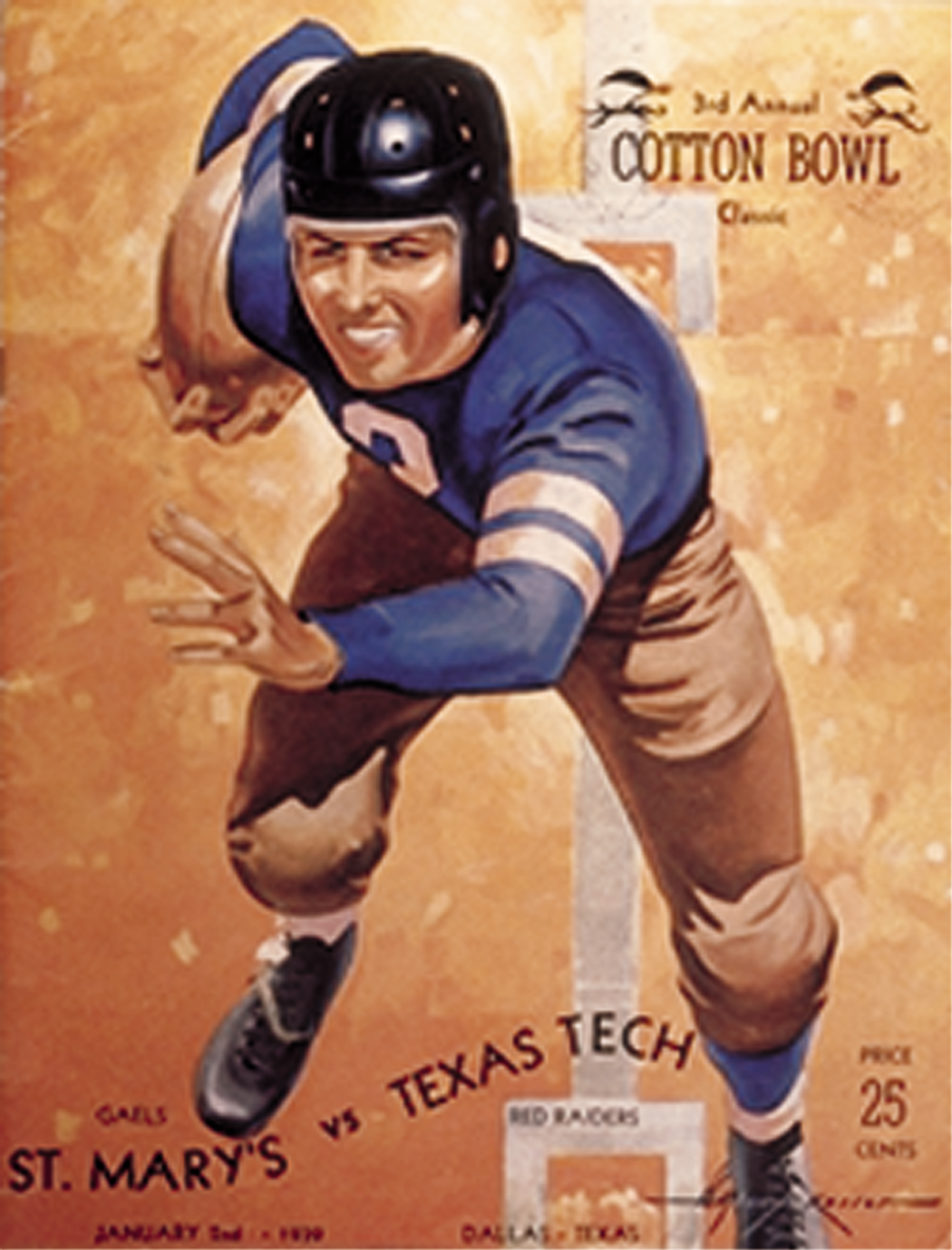
- 3rd Cotton Bowl Classic
Saint Mary's Gaels	Texas Tech Red Raiders
(5–2)	(10–0)
Independent	Border
20	13
Head coach: Slip Madigan	Head coach: Pete Cawthon
	AP 11
	1	2	3	4	Total
Saint Mary's	7	7	6	0	20
Texas Tech	0	0	0	13	13
- Date: January 2, 1939
- Season: 1938
- Stadium: Cotton Bowl
- Location: Dallas, Texas
- MVP: C Jerry Dowd (St. Mary’s); HB Elmer Tarbox (Texas Tech)
- Favorite: Texas Tech
- Referee: Harry Viner
- Attendance: 40,000

The Cotton Bowl in Dallas, Texas, hosted the Cotton Bowl Classic.

The 1939 Cotton Bowl Classic was the third edition of the postseason college football bowl game, between the St. Mary's Gaels and the Texas Tech Red Raiders.

== Background ==
Texas Tech was undefeated and ranked 11th in the final AP poll (released in early December). Sportswriters had tagged the California-based Gaels as a "Cinderella" team, due to their tawdry 5–2 record, though the two blemishes were by narrow margins to ranked teams on the road. It was the first bowl game for unranked St. Mary's and the second for Texas Tech, which played in the previous season's Sun Bowl.

== Game summary ==
Texas Tech committed eight turnovers in the game; five interceptions and three fumbles. Entering the fourth quarter, the Gaels led 20–0 with a touchdown scored in each quarter; runs by Ed Heffernan and Michael Klotovich in the first half and Whitey Smith's interception return in the third quarter.

Texas Tech scored twice in the fourth quarter on touchdown catches by Elmer Tarbox and E.J. McKnight from Gene Barnett. The extra point on the second score was blocked and the score was 20–13. Tech nearly tied the game when George Webb caught a pass from Barnett, heading for daylight until Lou Rimassa stopped him in St. Mary's territory. But Tech could only advance to St. Mary's 15-yard line and they failed to score; St. Mary's held on to win in one of the biggest upsets in college football history.

== Statistics ==
Attendance was recorded as 40,000.

Statistics	Saint Mary's	Texas Tech
First downs	11	7
Rushing yards	180	73
Passing yards	22	210
Interceptions	2	5
Total yards	202	283
Fumbles lost	1	3
Penalties–yards	8–65	5–30
Punts–average	11–47.5	11–34.3

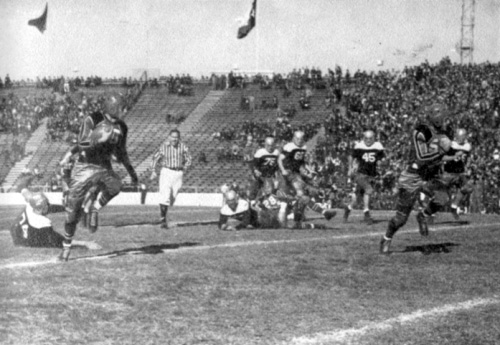
Action between St. Mary's and Texas Tech

== Aftermath ==
St. Mary's played in two more bowl games, in the mid-1940s, and lost both. The program was dropped in 1951 and later returned joined Division II, and moved up to Division I-AA in the 1990s; the football program was discontinued prior to the 2004 season. Texas Tech did not reach a Cotton Bowl again until 1995; the Red Raiders have yet to win in four appearances.
