= 1938 Washington Huskies football team =

American college football season

1938 Washington Huskies football
- Conference: Pacific Coast Conference
- Record: 3–5–1 (3–4–1 PCC)
- Head coach: Jimmy Phelan (9th season)
- Captain: Frank Peters
- Home stadium: University of Washington Stadium

1938 Pacific Coast Conference football standings
	Conf.					Overall
Team	W		L		T	W		L		T
No. 7 USC +	6	–	1	–	0	9	–	2	–	0
No. 14 California +	6	–	1	–	0	10	–	1	–	0
UCLA	4	–	3	–	1	7	–	4	–	1
Oregon State	4	–	3	–	1	5	–	3	–	1
Oregon	4	–	4	–	0	4	–	5	–	0
Washington	3	–	4	–	1	3	–	5	–	1
Idaho	2	–	3	–	1	6	–	3	–	1
Stanford	2	–	5	–	0	3	–	6	–	0
Washington State	1	–	7	–	0	2	–	8	–	0
Montana	0	–	1	–	0	5	–	3	–	1
+ – Conference co-champions; Rankings from AP Poll

The 1938 Washington Huskies football team was an American football team that represented the University of Washington during the 1938 college football season. In its ninth season under head coach Jimmy Phelan, the team compiled a 3–5–1 record, finished in sixth place in the Pacific Coast Conference, and was outscored by its opponents by a combined total of 83 to 68. Frank Peters was the team captain.

== Schedule ==
Date	Opponent	Site	Result	Attendance	Source
September 24	at Minnesota*	Memorial Stadium; Minneapolis, MN	L 0–15	50,000	
October 1	Idaho	University of Washington Stadium; Seattle, WA	T 12–12	20,000	
October 8	at UCLA	Los Angeles Memorial Coliseum; Los Angeles, CA	L 0–13	40,000	
October 15	Oregon State	University of Washington Stadium; Seattle, WA	L 6–13	20,000	
October 22	No. 3 California	University of Washington Stadium; Seattle, WA	L 7–14	27,889	
November 5	at Stanford	Stanford Stadium; Stanford, CA	W 10–7	22,000	
November 12	No. 9 USC	University of Washington Stadium; Seattle, WA	W 7–6	18,939	
November 19	at Oregon	Multnomah Stadium; Portland, OR (rivalry)	L 0–3	19,000	
November 26	Washington State	University of Washington Stadium; Seattle, WA (rivalry)	W 26–0	20,000	
*Non-conference game; Rankings from AP Poll released prior to the game; Source:

== NFL draft selections ==
Seven University of Washington Huskies were selected in the 1939 NFL draft, which lasted 22 rounds, with 200 selections.

= Husky Hall of Fame

Player	Position	Round	Pick	NFL club
Charles Newton	Back	2	4	Philadelphia Eagles
Jim Johnson	Back	10	8	Washington Redskins
Merle Miller	Back	11	10	New York Giants
Steve Slivinski	Guard	13	8	Washington Redskins
Art Means	Guard	14	7	Detroit Lions
Frank Peters	End	19	2	Pittsburgh Pirates
Tom Sheldrake	End	20	1	Pittsburgh Pirates
