= 1938 Nevada Wolf Pack football team =

American college football season

1938 Nevada Wolf Pack football
- Conference: Far Western Conference
- Record: 2–3–1 (1–2 FWC)
- Head coach: Doug Dashiell (3rd season)
- Home stadium: Mackay Field

1938 Far Western Conference football standings
	Conf.					Overall
Team	W		L		T	W		L		T
Pacific (CA) $	4	–	0	–	0	7	–	3	–	0
Fresno State	2	–	1	–	0	7	–	3	–	0
Nevada	1	–	2	–	0	2	–	3	–	1
Chico State	0	–	2	–	1	2	–	5	–	1
Cal Aggies	0	–	2	–	1	2	–	6	–	1
$ – Conference champion

The 1938 Nevada Wolf Pack football team was an American football team that represented the University of Nevada in the Far Western Conference (FWC) during the 1938 college football season. In their third and final season under head coach Doug Dashiell, the team compiled a 2–3–1 record (1–2 against conference opponents) and finished third in the conference.

Late in the season, Nevada players petitioned for the removal of coach Dashiell. In the final game of the season, a 51–0 loss to Amos Alonzo Stagg's Pacific Tigers, assistant coach Chet Scranton ran the team, though Dashiell continued to sit on the bench but did not direct the team. On November 1, 1938, the regents' executive committee cancelled the team's remaining three games due to turmoil within the program. Board chairman Silas Ross said: "After discussing the matter from all angles, we decided it would be persecuting the players to go through with the schedule. In view of the situation, with dissension existing, with several players out for the season with injuries and five more withdrawing from school, it seemed best for the interests of all concerned that the games be cancelled." Dashiell resigned as head coach.

== Schedule ==
Date	Opponent	Site	Result	Attendance	Source
September 24	College of Idaho*	Mackay Field; Reno, NV	W 18–0		
October 1	vs. Arizona State–Flagstaff*	Las Vegas, NV	T 12–12		
October 8	Chico State	Mackay Field; Reno, NV	W 22–0		
October 14	at Colorado State–Greeley*	Greeley, CO	L 13–27		
October 22	Fresno State^{†}	Mackay Field; Reno, NV	L 0–27	6,000	
October 28	at Pacific (CA)	Baxter Stadium; Stockton, CA	L 0–51	5,000	
*Non-conference game; ^{†}Homecoming
