= 1938 California Golden Bears football team =

American college football season

1938 California Golden Bears football

PCC co-champion
- Conference: Pacific Coast Conference

Ranking
- AP: No. 14
- Record: 10–1 (6–1 PCC)
- Head coach: Stub Allison (4th season)
- Home stadium: California Memorial Stadium

1938 Pacific Coast Conference football standings
	Conf.					Overall
Team	W		L		T	W		L		T
No. 7 USC +	6	–	1	–	0	9	–	2	–	0
No. 14 California +	6	–	1	–	0	10	–	1	–	0
UCLA	4	–	3	–	1	7	–	4	–	1
Oregon State	4	–	3	–	1	5	–	3	–	1
Oregon	4	–	4	–	0	4	–	5	–	0
Washington	3	–	4	–	1	3	–	5	–	1
Idaho	2	–	3	–	1	6	–	3	–	1
Stanford	2	–	5	–	0	3	–	6	–	0
Washington State	1	–	7	–	0	2	–	8	–	0
Montana	0	–	1	–	0	5	–	3	–	1
+ – Conference co-champions; Rankings from AP Poll

The 1938 California Golden Bears football team was an American football team that represented the University of California, Berkeley in the Pacific Coast Conference (PCC) during the 1938 college football season. In their fourth year under head coach Stub Allison, the team compiled a 10–1 record (6–1 against PCC opponents), finished in a tie for the PCC championship, was ranked No. 14 in the final AP Poll, and outscored its opponents by a combined total of 219 to 44.

== Schedule ==
Date	Opponent	Rank	Site	Result	Attendance	Source
September 24	Saint Mary's*		California Memorial Stadium; Berkeley, CA	W 12–7	50,000	
October 1	at Washington State		Rogers Field; Pullman, WA	W 27–3	10,000	
October 8	Cal Aggies*		California Memorial Stadium; Berkeley, CA	W 48–0	25,000	
October 8	Pacific (CA)*		California Memorial Stadium; Berkeley, CA	W 39–0	25,000	
October 15	UCLA		California Memorial Stadium; Berkeley, CA (rivalry)	W 20–7	40,000	
October 22	at Washington	No. 3	Husky Stadium; Seattle, WA	W 14–7	27,889	
October 29	Oregon State	No. 3	California Memorial Stadium; Berkeley, CA	W 13–7	25,000	
November 5	at No. 13 USC	No. 3	Los Angeles Memorial Coliseum; Los Angeles, CA	L 7–13	95,000	
November 12	Oregon	No. 14	California Memorial Stadium; Berkeley, CA	W 20–0	35,000	
November 19	Stanford	No. 9	California Memorial Stadium; Berkeley, CA (Big Game)	W 6–0	81,000	
December 26	Georgia Tech*	No. 12	California Memorial Stadium; Berkeley, CA	W 13–0	40,000	
*Non-conference game; Rankings from AP Poll released prior to the game; Source:
