= 1939 NFL draft =

National Football League draft

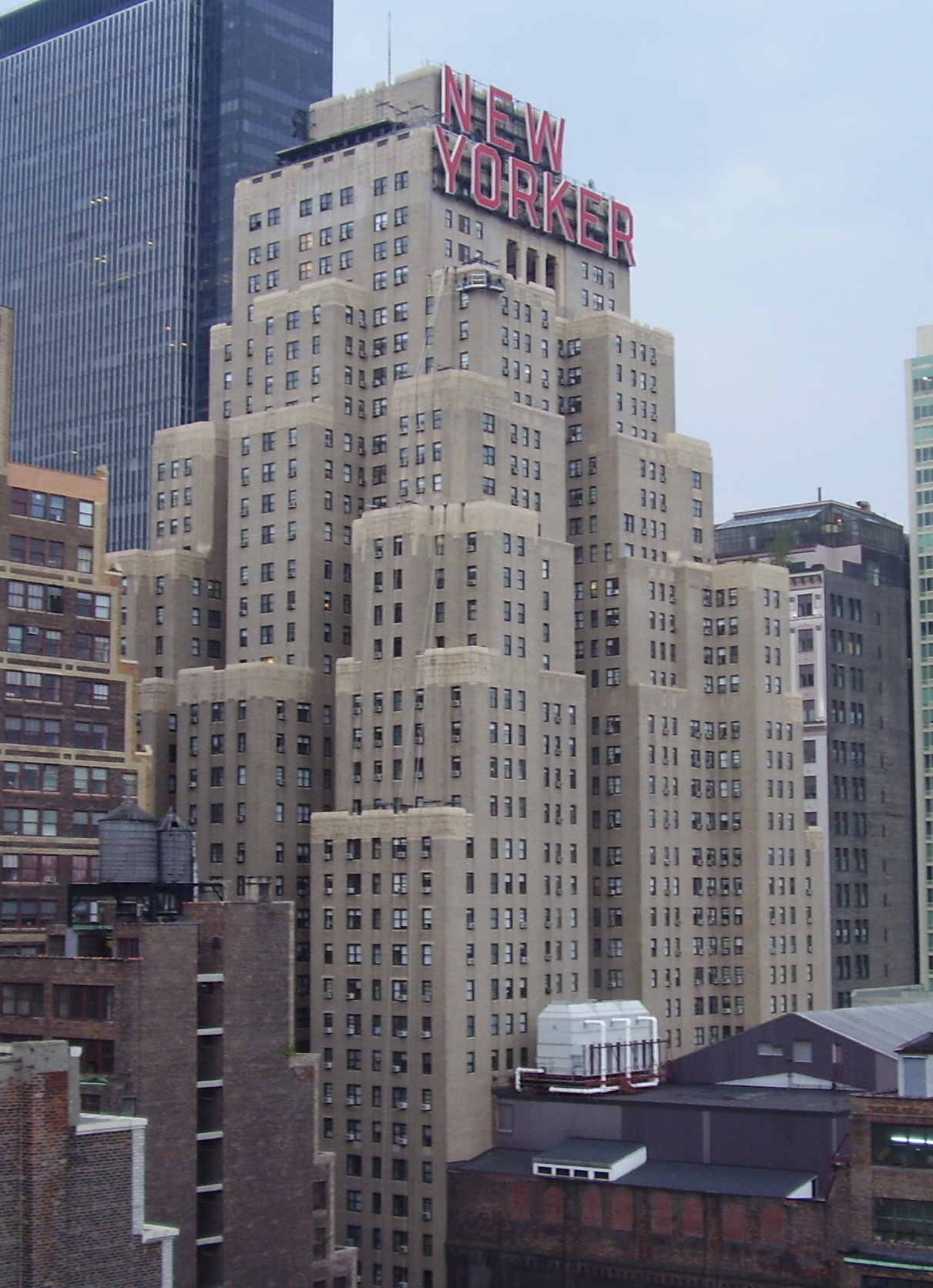
- New Yorker Hotel (location of the draft), photographed in 2006

General information
- Date: December 9, 1938
- Location: New Yorker Hotel in New York City, NY

Overview
- 200 total selections in 22 rounds
- League: NFL
- First selection: Ki Aldrich, C Chicago Cardinals
- Most selections (23): Brooklyn Dodgers
- Fewest selections (18): Pittsburgh Pirates
- Hall of Famers: 1: QB Sid Luckman

The 1939 NFL draft was held on December 9, 1938, at the New Yorker Hotel in New York City, New York. With the first overall pick of the draft, the Chicago Cardinals selected center Ki Aldrich.

== Player selections ==
‡	= Hall of Famer (Note: Players are identified as a Hall of Famer if they have been inducted into the Pro Football Hall of Fame.)
†	= Pro Bowler (Note: Players are identified as a Pro Bowler if they were selected for the Pro Bowl at any time in their career.)

Rnd.	Pick	Team	Player	Pos.	College	Notes
1	1	Chicago Cardinals	Ki Aldrich ^{†}	C	TCU	
1	2	Chicago Bears	Sid Luckman^{‡}	QB	Columbia	From Pittsburgh
1	3	Cleveland Rams	Parker Hall ^{†}	RB	Ole Miss	
1	4	Philadelphia Eagles	Davey O'Brien ^{†}	QB	TCU	1938 Heisman Trophy winner
1	5	Brooklyn Dodgers	Bob MacLeod	B	Dartmouth	
1	6	Chicago Bears	Bill Osmanski ^{†}	B	Holy Cross	
1	7	Detroit Lions	John Pingel	B	Michigan State	
1	8	Washington Redskins	I. B. Hale	T	TCU	
1	9	Green Bay Packers	Larry Buhler ^{†}	B	Minnesota	
1	10	New York Giants	Walt Nielsen	B	Arizona	
2	11	Brooklyn Dodgers	Pug Manders ^{†}	FB	Drake	from Pittsburgh
2	12	Chicago Cardinals	Marshall Goldberg	HB	Pittsburgh	
2	13	Cleveland Rams	Gaylon Smith	FB	Southwestern (TN)	
2	14	Philadelphia Eagles	Charles Newton	B	Washington	
2	15	Brooklyn Dodgers	Bob Haak	T	Indiana	
3	16	Chicago Cardinals	Alvord Wolff	T	Santa Clara	
3	17	Pittsburgh Pirates	Billy Patterson	TB	Baylor	
3	18	Cleveland Rams	Elmer Tarbox	B	Texas Tech	
3	19	Philadelphia Eagles	Joe Mihal ^{†}	T	Purdue	
3	20	Brooklyn Dodgers	Waddy Young	TE	Oklahoma	
3	21	Chicago Bears	John Wysocki	E	Villanova	
3	22	Detroit Lions	Howard Weiss	FB	Wisconsin	
3	23	Washington Redskins	Charlie Holm	B	Alabama	
3	24	Green Bay Packers	Charley Brock ^{†}	C	Nebraska	
3	25	New York Giants	John Chickerneo	BB	Pittsburgh	
4	26	Pittsburgh Pirates	Hugh McCullough	DB	Oklahoma	
4	27	Chicago Cardinals	Hal Stebbins	B	Pittsburgh	
4	28	Cleveland Rams	Wally Garard	T	Saint Mary's (CA)	
4	29	Philadelphia Eagles	Billy Dewell ^{†}	E	SMU	
4	30	Brooklyn Dodgers	Vic Bottari	B	California	
5	31	Chicago Cardinals	Bill Daddio	E	Pittsburgh	
5	32	Pittsburgh Pirates	Ernie Wheeler	B	North Dakota Agricultural	
5	33	Cleveland Rams	Eddie Gatto	T	LSU	
5	34	Philadelphia Eagles	Zed Coston	G	Texas A&M	
5	35	Brooklyn Dodgers	Jack Kinnison	C	Missouri	
5	36	Chicago Bears	Joe Delaney	T	Holy Cross	
5	37	Detroit Lions	Steve Maronic	T	North Carolina	
5	38	Washington Redskins	Dick Todd ^{†}	B	Texas A&M	
5	39	Green Bay Packers	Lynn Hovland	G	Wisconsin	
5	40	New York Giants	Don Willis	B	Clemson	
6	41	Pittsburgh Pirates	Sam Boyd	QB	Baylor	
6	42	Chicago Cardinals	George Faust	B	Minnesota	
6	43	Cleveland Rams	Barney McGarry	T	Utah	
6	44	Philadelphia Eagles	Jake Schuehle	B	Rice	
6	45	Brooklyn Dodgers	Len Janiak	B	Ohio	
6	46	Brooklyn Dodgers	Ed Beinor ^{†}	T	Notre Dame	
6	47	Detroit Lions	Joe Wendlick	E	Oregon State	
6	48	Washington Redskins	Dave Anderson	B	California	
6	49	Green Bay Packers	Larry Craig ^{†}	E	South Carolina	
6	50	New York Giants	Jerry Ginney	G	Santa Clara	
7	51	Chicago Cardinals	Bill Dwyer	B	New Mexico	
7	52	Pittsburgh Pirates	Eddie Palumbo	B	Detroit	
7	53	Cleveland Rams	Jerry Dowd	C	Saint Mary's	
7	54	Philadelphia Eagles	Tony Ippolito	B	Purdue	
7	55	Brooklyn Dodgers	Alex Schoenbaum	T	Ohio State	
7	56	Chicago Bears	Charlie Heileman	E	Iowa State	
7	57	Detroit Lions	Darrell Tully	B	East Texas State	
7	58	Washington Redskins	Quinton Lumpkin	C	Georgia	
7	59	Green Bay Packers	Frank Twedell	T	Minnesota	
7	60	New York Giants	Lloyd Woodell	C	Arkansas	
8	61	Pittsburgh Pirates	Ole Nelson	E	Michigan State	
8	62	Chicago Cardinals	Sherm Hinkebein	C	Kentucky	
8	63	Cleveland Rams	Bronco Brunner	B	Tulane	
8	64	Philadelphia Eagles	George Somers	T	La Salle	
8	65	Brooklyn Dodgers	Dan Hill	C	Duke	
8	66	Chicago Bears	Bob Dannies	C	Pittsburgh	
8	67	Detroit Lions	Dick Trzuskowski	T	Idaho	
8	68	Washington Redskins	Bo Russell	T	Auburn	
8	69	Green Bay Packers	Paul Kell ^{†}	T	Notre Dame	
8	70	New York Giants	Pete Zagar	T	Stanford	
9	71	Chicago Cardinals	Earl Brown	E	Notre Dame	
9	72	Pittsburgh Pirates	Steve Petro	G	Pittsburgh	
9	73	Cleveland Rams	Lew Bostick	G	Alabama	
9	74	Philadelphia Eagles	Rankin Britt	E	Texas A&M	
9	75	Brooklyn Dodgers	Forrest Kline	G	TCU	
9	76	Chicago Bears	Ray Bray ^{†}	G	Western State Teachers (MI)	
9	77	Detroit Lions	Bill Callihan	B	Nebraska	
9	78	Washington Redskins	Wilbur Moore ^{†}	B	Minnesota	
9	79	Green Bay Packers	Johnny Hall	B	TCU	
9	80	New York Giants	Bob Mills	T	Nebraska	
10	81	Pittsburgh Pirates	Jack Lee	B	Carnegie Tech	
10	82	Chicago Cardinals	Earl Crowder	QB	Oklahoma	
10	83	Cleveland Rams	Frank Petrick	E	Indiana	
10	84	Philadelphia Eagles	Bill McKeever	T	Cornell	
10	85	Brooklyn Dodgers	Kimble Bradley	B	Ole Miss	
10	86	Chicago Bears	Walt Wood	B	Tennessee	
10	87	Detroit Lions	Raymond George ^{†}	T	USC	
10	88	Washington Redskins	Jimmy Johnston	B	Washington	
10	89	Green Bay Packers	Vince Gavre	B	Wisconsin	
10	90	New York Giants	Tom Roberts	T	DePaul	
11	91	Chicago Cardinals	Bowden Wyatt	E	Tennessee	
11	92	Pittsburgh Pirates	Lou Tomasetti	B	Bucknell	
11	93	Cleveland Rams	Sid Roth	G	Cornell	
11	94	Philadelphia Eagles	Paul Humphrey	C	Purdue	
11	95	Brooklyn Dodgers	George Lenc	E	Augustana (IL)	
11	96	Chicago Bears	Al Braga	B	San Francisco	
11	97	Detroit Lions	Tony Calvelli	C	Stanford	
11	98	Washington Redskins	Jim German	B	Centre	
11	99	Green Bay Packers	Charley Sprague	E	SMU	
11	100	New York Giants	Merl Miller	B	Washington	
12	101	Pittsburgh Pirates	Denny Cochran	B	Saint Louis	
12	102	Chicago Cardinals	Jim Thomas	G	Oklahoma	
12	103	Cleveland Rams	Chet Adams ^{†}	T	Ohio	
12	104	Brooklyn Dodgers	Ralph Heikkinen	G	Michigan	
12	106	Chicago Bears	Hal Roise	B	Idaho	
12	107	Detroit Lions	Jim Coughlan	E	Santa Clara	
12	108	Washington Redskins	Bob O'Mara	B	Duke	
12	109	Brooklyn Dodgers	Carl Kaplanoff	T	Ohio State	
12	110	New York Giants	Bruno Schroeder	E	Texas A&M	
13	111	Chicago Cardinals	Andy Sabados	G	The Citadel	
13	112	Pittsburgh Pirates	Fabian Hoffman	E	Pittsburgh	
13	113	Cleveland Rams	Joel Hitt	E	Mississippi College	
13	114	Philadelphia Eagles	Allie White	T	TCU	
13	115	Brooklyn Dodgers	George Gembis	B	Wayne (MI)	
13	116	Chicago Bears	Ed Bock	G	Iowa State	
13	117	Detroit Lions	Prescott Hutchins	G	Oregon State	
13	118	Washington Redskins	Steve Slivinski ^{†}	G	Washington	
13	119	Green Bay Packers	Dan Elmer	C	Minnesota	
13	120	New York Giants	Sam Allis	B	Centenary	
14	121	Pittsburgh Pirates	Ed Clary	B	South Carolina	
14	122	Chicago Cardinals	Blase Miatovich	T	San Francisco	
14	123	Cleveland Rams	John Ryland	C	UCLA	
14	124	Philadelphia Eagles	Joe Aleskus	T	Ohio State	
14	125	Brooklyn Dodgers	Ray Carnelly	B	Carnegie Tech	
14	126	Chicago Bears	Anton Stolfa	B	Luther	
14	127	Detroit Lions	Art Means	G	Washington	
14	128	Washington Redskins	Bob Hoffman	B	USC	College junior; returned to USC
14	129	Green Bay Packers	Bill Badgett	T	Georgia	
14	130	New York Giants	George Watson	B	North Carolina	
15	131	Chicago Cardinals	Russ Clarke	G	Santa Clara	
15	132	Pittsburgh Pirates	John Tosi	C	Niagara	
15	133	Cleveland Rams	Ben Friend	T	LSU	
15	134	Philadelphia Eagles	Foster Watkins	B	West Texas State	
15	135	Brooklyn Dodgers	Lou Trunzo	G	Wake Forest	
15	136	Chicago Bears	Bob Voigts	T	Northwestern	
15	137	Detroit Lions	Gene Hodge	E	East Texas State	
15	138	Washington Redskins	Eric Tipton	B	Duke	
15	139	Green Bay Packers	Tom Greenfield ^{†}	C	Arizona	
15	140	New York Giants	Gil Duggan	T	Oklahoma	
16	141	Pittsburgh Pirates	Al Lezouski	G	Pittsburgh	
16	142	Chicago Cardinals	Gus Goins	E	Clemson	
16	143	Cleveland Rams	Gordon Reupke	B	Iowa State	
16	144	Philadelphia Eagles	Irv Hall	B	Brown	
16	145	Brooklyn Dodgers	Charley Gross	G	Bradley	
16	146	Chicago Bears	Ken Armstrong	T	Tarkio	
16	147	Detroit Lions	Bill Lazetich		Montana	
16	148	Washington Redskins	Dick Farman ^{†}	T	Washington State	
16	149	Green Bay Packers	Roy Bellin	B	Wisconsin	
16	150	New York Giants	Ted Panish	B	Bradley	
17	151	Chicago Cardinals	Ev Elkins	B	Marshall	
17	152	Pittsburgh Pirates	Ed Longhi	C	Notre Dame	
17	153	Cleveland Rams	Mike Perrie	B	St. Mary's (CA)	
17	154	Philadelphia Eagles	Bob Riddell	E	South Dakota State	
17	155	Brooklyn Dodgers	John Siegal ^{†}	E	Columbia	
17	156	Chicago Bears	Raphael Masters	E	Newberry	
17	157	Detroit Lions	Ralph Neihaus	T	Dayton	
17	158	Washington Redskins	Clyde Shugart ^{†}	T	Iowa State	
17	159	Green Bay Packers	John Yerby	E	Oregon	
17	160	New York Giants	Jack Sanders	T	SMU	
18	161	Pittsburgh Pirates	Dave Shirk	E	Kansas	
18	162	Chicago Cardinals	Frank Huffman	E	Marshall	
18	163	Cleveland Rams	Alex Atty	G	West Virginia	
18	164	Philadelphia Eagles	Charlie Gainor	E	North Dakota	
18	165	Brooklyn Dodgers	Paul Morin	T	Iowa State	
18	166	Chicago Bears	Solly Sherman ^{†}	B	Chicago	
18	167	Detroit Lions	Dutch Niemant	B	New Mexico	
18	168	Washington Redskins	Boyd Morgan	B	USC	
18	169	Green Bay Packers	Frank Balazs ^{†}	B	Iowa	
18	170	New York Giants	Will Dolman	E	California	
19	171	Chicago Cardinals	Mike Kochel	G	Fordham	
19	172	Pittsburgh Pirates	Frank Peters	E	Washington	
19	173	Cleveland Rams	Bill Lane	B	Bucknell	
19	174	Philadelphia Eagles	Morris White	B	Tulsa	
19	175	Brooklyn Dodgers	Ferrell Anderson	G	Kansas	
19	176	Chicago Bears	Ed Simonich	B	Notre Dame	
19	177	Detroit Lions	Tony Tonelli	G	USC	
19	178	Washington Redskins	Phil Smith	T	St. Benedict's	
19	179	Green Bay Packers	John Brennan	G	Michigan	
19	180	New York Giants	Bill Paulman	B	Stanford	
20	181	Pittsburgh Pirates	Tom Sheldrake	E	Washington	
20	182	Chicago Cardinals	Tom Rice	T	San Francisco	
20	183	Cleveland Rams	Paul Graham	B	Indiana	
20	184	Philadelphia Eagles	Dick Gormley	C	LSU	
20	185	Brooklyn Dodgers	Tony Popp	E	Toledo	
20	186	Chicago Bears	George Vogeler	C	Oklahoma A&M	
20	187	Detroit Lions	Jim McDonald	C	Illinois	
20	188	Washington Redskins	Paul Coop	T	Centre	
20	189	Green Bay Packers	Charles Schultz ^{†}	T	Minnesota	
20	190	New York Giants	Lyle Smith	G	Tulane	
21	191	Chicago Bears	Aldo Forte ^{†}	T	Montana	
21	192	Detroit Lions	Merrill Waters	E	BYU	
21	193	Detroit Lions	Matt Kuber	G	Villanova	
21	194	Green Bay Packers	Willard Hofer	B	Notre Dame	
21	195	New York Giants	Mario Tonelli	B	Notre Dame	
22	196	Chicago Bears	Everett Kircher	B	Iowa State	
22	197	Detroit Lions	Al Howe	T	Xavier	
22	198	Washington Redskins	Al Cruver	B	Washington State	
22	199	Green Bay Packers	Bill Gunther	B	Santa Clara	
22	200	New York Giants	Jack Rhodes	G	Texas	

== Hall of Famers ==
- Sid Luckman, quarterback from Columbia taken 1st round 2nd overall by the Chicago Bears.

Inducted: Professional Football Hall of Fame class of 1965.

== Notable undrafted players ==
†	= Pro Bowler

Original NFL team	Player	Pos.	College	Notes
Chicago Cardinals	Henry Adams	C	Pittsburgh	
Cleveland Rams	Riley Matheson	T	Texas Western	
Detroit Lions	Connie Mack Berry	E	NC State	
Green Bay Packers	Harry Jacunski ^{†}	E	Fordham	
Philadelphia Eagles	Jack Ferrante	E		
