= 1939 Philadelphia Eagles season =

NFL team season

- Owner: Bert Bell
- Head coach: Bert Bell
- Home stadium: Philadelphia Municipal Stadium

Results
- Record: 1–9–1
- Division place: 4th (tied) NFL Eastern
- Playoffs: Did not qualify

The 1939 Philadelphia Eagles season was the franchise's 7th season in the National Football League. The team failed to improve on their previous output of 5–6, winning only one game. The team failed to qualify for the playoffs for the seventh consecutive season. The October 22 game against Brooklyn was the first NFL game to be televised. The Eagles threw 267 passes in 1939, or 24.3 per game, the most by an NFL team in the 1930s.

== Off season ==
The Eagle moved their training camp to St. Joseph's University in Philadelphia, Pennsylvania.

=== NFL draft ===
The 1939 NFL draft had 22 rounds and was held on December 9, 1938.

The Eagles drafted in the 4th spot in the 20 rounds they had picks. They chose a total 20 players, of which 9 made the team for the 1939 season.

The Chicago Cardinals choose Charles "Ki" Aldrich as a center that went to Texas Christian. The TCU Horned Frogs had 3 players in the top 7 picks in the first round

=== Player selections ===
The table shows the Eagles selections and what picks they had that were traded away and the team that ended up with that pick. It is possible the Eagles' pick ended up with this team via another team that the Eagles made a trade with. Not shown are acquired picks that the Eagles traded away.

= Pro Bowler	= Hall of Famer

Rd	Pick #	Player	Position	College
1	4	Davey O'Brien	Back	Texas Christian
2	14	Charles Newton	Back	Washington
3	19	Joe Mihal	Tackle	Purdue
4	29	Billy Dewell	Offensive End	Southern Methodist
5	34	Fred Coston	Guard	Texas A&M
6	44	Jake Schuehle	Back	Rice
7	54	Tony Ippolito	Back	Purdue
8	64	George Somers	Tackle	La Salle
9	74	Rankin Britt	End	Texas A&M
10	84	Bill McKeever	Tackle	Cornell
11	94	Paul Humphrey	Center	Purdue
12	104	Jack Kraynick	Back	North Carolina
13	114	Thomas "Allie" White	Tackle	Texas Christian
14	124	Joe Aleskus	Tackle	Ohio State
15	134	Foster Watkins	Back	West Texas State Teachers
16	144	Irv Hall	Back	Brown
17	154	Bob Riddell	End	South Dakota State
18	164	Charlie Gainor	End	North Dakota
19	174	Morris White	Back	Tulsa
20	184	Dick Gormley	Center	Louisiana State
21		No Pick in this Round		.
22		No Pick in this Round		.

== Regular season ==
=== Schedule ===
Week	Date	Opponent	Result	Record	Attendance
1	September 17	Washington Redskins	L 0–7	0–1	33,258
2	September 24	New York Giants	L 3–13	0–2	30,600
3	October 1	Brooklyn Dodgers	T 0–0	0–2–1	1,880
4	October 15	at New York Giants	L 10–27	0–3–1	34,471
5	October 22	at Brooklyn Dodgers	L 14–23	0–4–1	13,057
6	November 5	at Washington Redskins	L 6–7	0–5–1	20,444
7	November 12	Green Bay Packers	L 16–23	0–6–1	23,000
8	November 19	at Chicago Bears	L 14–27	0–7–1	21,398
9	November 23	Pittsburgh Pirates	W 17–14	1–7–1	20,000
10	November 26	at Pittsburgh Pirates	L 12–24	1–8–1	8,788
11	December 3	at Cleveland Rams	L 13–35	1–9–1	9,189

== Standings ==
NFL Eastern Division
	W	L	T	PCT	DIV	PF	PA	STK
New York Giants	9	1	1	.900	7–0–1	168	85	W4
Washington Redskins	8	2	1	.800	6–1–1	242	94	L1
Brooklyn Dodgers	4	6	1	.400	3–4–1	108	219	L3
Pittsburgh Pirates	1	9	1	.100	1–7	114	216	W1
Philadelphia Eagles	1	9	1	.100	1–6–1	105	200	L2

Note: Tie games were not officially counted in the standings until 1972.

== Playoffs ==
The Eagles had a 1–9–1 record and failed to make it to the 1939 NFL Championship Game. The game was on December 10, 1939, at Wisconsin State Fair Park in West Allis near Milwaukee, Wisconsin. This was the seventh NFL championship game played. The Green Bay Packers defeated the New York Giants to win their fifth title. The game attendance was 32,379.

The game matched the champions of the Eastern Division, New York Giants (9–1–1) against the Western Division champion Green Bay Packers (9–2–0). The Packers won 27–0 in a rematch of the 1938 NFL Championship Game that was won by the Giants.

== Roster ==
(All time List of Philadelphia Eagles players in franchise history)

= 1939 Pro All Star	= Hall of Famer

As was in 1937 roster and 1938 roster, this year team is mostly rookies and players with 1 or 2 years NFL experience.

NO.	Player	AGE	POS	GP	GS	WT	HT	YRS	College
	Bert Bell	44	Coach	_{1939 record} 1–9–1	_{NFL-Eagles; Lifetime} 9–34–2			4th	Pennsylvania
	Jay Arnold	27	HB-WB-DB; BB-KR-PR	10	9	210	6–1	2	Texas
	Rankin Britt	26	End	1	0	205	6–2	Rookie	Texas A&M
	Joe Bukant	23	Back	11	1	216	6–0	1	Washington (MO)
	Tom Burnette	24	BB	11	3	194	6–1	Rookie	North Carolina
	Joe Carter*	29	E	11	11	201	6–1	6	_{Austin College and SMU}
	Zed Coston	24	C	1	0	222	6–2	Rookie	Texas A&M
	Bree Cuppoletti	29	G	10	8	200	5–10	5	Oregon
	Woody Dow	23	BB-FB	9	2	195	6–0	1	West Texas A&M
	Drew Ellis	25	T	11	9	215	6–1	1	TCU
	Maurice Harper	29	Cen	11	8	227	6–4	3	Austin
	Bill Hewitt	30	E-DE	11	2	190	5–9	7	Michigan
	Bill Hughes	24	G-C	11	6	226	6–1	2	Texas
	Ray Keeling	24	T-G	9	0	242	6–3	1	Texas
	Elmer Kolberg	23	HB-E	8	3	201	6–4	Rookie	Oregon State
	Emmett Kriel	23	G	1	0	199	6–2	Rookie	Baylor
	Emmett Mortell	23	B	8	2	181	6–1	2	_{Notre Dame and Wisconsin}
	Davey O'Brien*	22	QB-TB	11	8	151	5–7	Rookie	TCU
	Bob Pylman	26	T	10	2	214	6–4	1	South Dakota State
	Red Ramsey	28	E	11	6	196	6–0	1	Texas Tech
	Hank Reese	30	C-G	5	3	214	5–11	6	Temple
	Dick Riffle	24	B	10	3	200	6–1	1	Albright
	Theodore Schmitt	23	G	11	8	219	5–11	1	Pittsburgh
	Jake Schuehle	22	HB	2	0	196	6–0	Rookie	Rice
	Dave Smukler	25	FB-LB	4	4	226	6–1	2	_{Missouri and Temple}
	George Somers	24	T	9	3	253	6–2	Rookie	La Salle
	Allie White	24	G-T	7	0	212	5–11	Rookie	Texas Christian
	Clem Woltman	24	T	10	8	214	6–1	1	Purdue
	28 Players; Team Average	25.1		11		208.2	6–0.6	1.6	

== Awards and honors ==
- Davey O'Brien finishes 2nd in pass attempts with 210
- Davey O'Brien finishes 2nd in pass completions with 99
- Davey O'Brien leads NFL in passing yards with 1324
- Joe Carter named to Pro All_Star team.
- Davey O'Brien named to Pro All-Star team.
