= 1939 New York Giants season =

NFL team 15th season

- Owner: Tim Mara
- Head coach: Steve Owen
- Home stadium: Polo Grounds

Results
- Record: 9–1–1
- Division place: 1st NFL Eastern
- Playoffs: Lost NFL Championship (at Packers) 0–27

The 1939 New York Giants season was the franchise's 15th season in the National Football League.

== Schedule ==
Week	Date	Opponent	Result	Record	Venue	Recap
1	Bye					
2	Bye					
3	September 24	at **Philadelphia Eagles**	**W** 13–3	1–0	Philadelphia Municipal Stadium	Recap
4	October 1	at **Washington Redskins**	**T** 0–0	1–0–1	Griffith Stadium	Recap
5	October 8	at **Pittsburgh Pirates**	**W** 14–7	2–0–1	Forbes Field	Recap
6	October 15	**Philadelphia Eagles**	**W** 27–10	3–0–1	Polo Grounds	Recap
7	October 22	Chicago Bears	**W** 16–13	4–0–1	Polo Grounds	Recap
8	October 29	at **Brooklyn Dodgers**	**W** 7–6	5–0–1	Ebbets Field	Recap
9	November 5	at Detroit Lions	**L** 14–18	5–1–1	Briggs Stadium	Recap
10	November 12	Chicago Cardinals	**W** 17–7	6–1–1	Polo Grounds	Recap
11	November 19	**Pittsburgh Pirates**	**W** 23–7	7–1–1	Polo Grounds	Recap
12	November 26	**Brooklyn Dodgers**	**W** 28–7	8–1–1	Polo Grounds	Recap
13	December 3	**Washington Redskins**	**W** 9–7	9–1–1	Polo Grounds	Recap
Note: Intra-division opponents are in **bold** text.

== Game summaries ==
=== Week 3: at Philadelphia Eagles ===
Week Three: New York Giants at Philadelphia Eagles

Quarter	1	2	3	4	Total
Giants	0	6	0	7	13
Eagles	3	0	0	0	3

at Philadelphia Municipal Stadium, Philadelphia, Pennsylvania

- Date: September 24
- Game attendance: 30,864

Game information

First quarter

- PHI Henry Reese 15-yard FG

Second quarter

- NYG Ken Strong 18-yard FG
- NYG Ward Cuff 35-yard FG

Fourth quarter

- NYG Tuffy Leemans 16-yard run (Cuff kick)

=== Week 4: at Washington Redskins ===
Week Four: New York Giants at Washington Redskins

Quarter	1	2	3	4	Total
Giants	0	0	0	0	0
Redskins	0	0	0	0	0

at Griffith Stadium, Washington, D.C.

- Date: October 1
- Game attendance: 26,342

=== Week 5: at Pittsburgh Pirates ===
Week Five: New York Giants at Pittsburgh Pirates

Quarter	1	2	3	4	Total
Giants	0	0	14	0	14
Pirates	0	7	0	0	7

at Forbes Field, Pittsburgh, Pennsylvania

- Date: October 8
- Game attendance: 9,663

Game information

Second quarter

- PIT Swede Johnston 1-yard run (Armand Niccolai kick)

Third quarter

- NYG Cuff 20-yard pass from Ed Danowski (Cuff kick)
- NYG Cuff 5-yard pass from Danowski (Cuff kick)

=== Week 6: vs. Philadelphia Eagles ===
Week Six: Philadelphia Eagles at New York Giants

Quarter	1	2	3	4	Total
Eagles	3	7	0	0	10
Giants	0	7	10	10	27

at Polo Grounds, New York, New York

- Date: October 15
- Game attendance: 34,471

Game information

First quarter

- PHI Henry Reese 43-yard FG

Second quarter

- PHI Theodore Smith 63-yard fumble return (Fran Murray kick)
- NYG Jiggs Kline 4-yard pass from Eddie Miller (Strong kick)

Third quarter

- NYG Hank Soar 40-yard interception return (Soar kick)
- NYG Cuff 38-yard FG

Fourth quarter

- NYG Len Barnum 1-yard run (Strong kick)
- NYG Strong 19-yard FG

=== Week 7: vs. Chicago Bears ===
Week Seven: Chicago Bears at New York Giants

Quarter	1	2	3	4	Total
Bears	0	0	0	13	13
Giants	3	7	0	6	16

at Polo Grounds, New York, New York

- Date: October 22
- Game attendance: 58,963

Game information

First quarter

- NYG Cuff 43-yard FG

Second quarter

- NYG Barnum 13-yard run

Fourth quarter

- NYG Cuff 40-yard FG
- NYG Cuff 24-yard FG
- CHB Dick Plasman 68-yard pass from Sid Luckman (conversion failed)
- CHB Maniaci 3-yard rush (Jack Manders kick)

Rushing

CHB – Joe Maniaci – 15 CAR, 102 YDS, TD

=== Week 8: at Brooklyn Dodgers ===
Week Eight: New York Giants at Brooklyn Dodgers

Quarter	1	2	3	4	Total
Giants	0	7	0	0	7
Dodgers	3	0	3	0	6

at Ebbets Field, Brooklyn, New York

- Date: October 29
- Game attendance: 34,032

Game information

First quarter

- BRK Ralph Kercheval 20-yard FG

Second quarter

- NYG Leemans 2-yard run (Strong kick)

Third quarter

- BRK Kercheval 47-yard FG

=== Week 9: at Detroit Lions ===
Week Nine: New York Giants at Detroit Lions

Quarter	1	2	3	4	Total
Giants	0	0	14	0	14
Lions	3	3	3	9	18

at Briggs Stadium, Detroit, Michigan

- Date: November 5
- Game attendance: 47,492

Game information

First quarter

- DET Chuck Hanneman 34-yard FG

Second quarter

- DET Phil Martinovich 37-yard FG

Third quarter

- NYG Leemans 47-yard pass from Barnum (Cuff kick)
- DET Martinovich 19-yard FG
- NYG Al Owen 5-yard pass from Danowski (Strong kick)

Fourth quarter

- DET Kent Ryan 6-yard pass from Dwight Sloan (conversion failed)
- DET Martinovich 33-yard FG

=== Week 10: vs. Chicago Cardinals ===
Week Ten: Chicago Cardinals at New York Giants

Quarter	1	2	3	4	Total
Cardinals	0	7	0	0	7
Giants	10	7	0	0	17

at Polo Grounds, New York, New York

- Date: November 12
- Game attendance: 28,217

Game information

First quarter

- NYG Soar 3-yard run (Soar kick)
- NYG Barnum 47-yard FG

Second quarter

- NYG Leemans 8-yard pass from Barnum (Barnum kick)
- CHC Marshall Goldberg 3-yard run (George Faust kick)

=== Week 11: vs. Pittsburgh Pirates ===
Week Eight: New York Giants at Brooklyn Dodgers

Quarter	1	2	3	4	Total
Pirates	0	0	0	7	7
Giants	7	6	3	7	23

at Polo Grounds, New York, New York

- Date: November 19
- Game attendance: 19,372

Game information

First quarter

- NYG Soar 2-yard run (Strong kick)

Second quarter

- NYG Barnum 37-yard FG
- NYG Barnum 28-yard FG

Third quarter

- NYG Strong 24-yard FG

Fourth quarter

- PIT Boyd Brumbaugh 19-yard run (Niccolai kick)
- NYG Miller 21-yard run (Barnum kick)

=== Week 12: vs. Brooklyn Dodgers ===
Week Eight: Brooklyn Dodgers at New York Giants

Quarter	1	2	3	4	Total
Dodgers	0	0	0	7	7
Giants	0	7	7	14	28

at Polo Grounds, New York, New York

- Date: November 26
- Game attendance: 30,144

Game information

Second quarter

- NYG Jim Lee Howell 9-yard pass from Barnum (Strong kick)

Third quarter

- NYG Kink Richards 10-yard run (Cuff kick)

Fourth quarter

- BRK Manders 2-yard run (Bruiser Kinard kick)
- NYG Leemans 3-yard run (Barnum kick)
- NYG Howell pass from Miller (Strong kick)

Rushing

- BRK – Clarence "Pug" Manders – 21 CAR, 101 YDS, TD

=== Week 13: vs. Washington Redskins ===
Week Eight: Brooklyn Dodgers at New York Giants

Quarter	1	2	3	4	Total
Redskins	0	0	0	7	7
Giants	3	3	3	0	9

at Polo Grounds, New York, New York

- Date: December 3
- Game attendance: 62,404

Game information

First quarter

- NYG Cuff 40-yard FG

Second quarter

- NYG Strong 19-yard FG

Third quarter

- NYG Cuff 15-yard FG

Fourth quarter

- WAS Bob Masterson 20-yard pass from Frank Filchock (Masterson kick)

== Playoffs ==
Round	Date	Opponent	Result	Venue	Recap
Championship	December 10	at Green Bay Packers	L 0–27	Wisconsin State Fair Park	Recap

== NFL Championship Game ==
1939 NFL Championship Game: New York Giants at Green Bay Packers

Quarter	1	2	3	4	Total
Giants	0	0	0	0	0
Packers	7	0	10	10	27

at Wisconsin State Fair Park, West Allis, Wisconsin

- Date: December 10
- Game attendance: 32,279

Game information

First quarter

- GB Milt Gantenbein 7-yard pass from Herber (Tiny Engebretsen kick)

Third quarter

- GB Engebretsen 29-yard FG
- GB Laws 31-yard pass from Cecil Isbell (Engebretsen kick)

Fourth quarter

- GB Ernie Smith 42-yard FG
- GB Ed Jankowski 1-yard run (Smith kick)

Passing

- NYG – Ed Danowski – 4/12, 47 YDS, 3 INT
- GB – Arnie Herber – 5/8, 62 YDS, TD, 3 INT

Rushing

- NYG – Tuffy Leemans – 12 CAR, 22 YDS
- GB – Andy Uram – 10 CAR, 35 YDS

Receiving

- NYG Tuffy Leemans – REC, 37 YDS
- GB Joe Laws – REC, 31 YDS, TD

== Roster ==
1939 New York Giants final roster
Backs: 10 Len Barnum RB/CB/K/P; 18 Dale Burnett RB/CB; 14 Ward Cuff RB/CB/K; 22 Ed Danowski RB/S/P; 28 Nello Falaschi FB/LB; 11 Bull Karcis RB/CB; 4 Tuffy Leemans RB/S; 9 Eddie Miller RB/CB/S/P; 6 Al Owen RB/S; 13 Kink Richards RB/CB; 20 Leland Shaffer FB/LB; 15 Hank Soar RB/CB/K; 30 Ken Strong RB/CB/K	Linemen/Linebackers: 55 Pete Cole G/DG; 36 Frank Cope T/DT; 2 Johnny Dell Isola G/DG; 7 Mel Hein C/LB; 31 Larry Johnson C/LB; 5 Kayo Lunday C/G/LB/DG; 33 John Mellus T/DT; 39 Doug Oldershaw G/DG; 44 Ox Parry T/DT; 42 Orville Tuttle G/DG; 66 Art White G/DG; 50 Ed Widseth T/DT	Ends/Receivers: 29 Chuck Gelatka; 21 Jim Lee Howell; 27 Jiggs Kline; 23 Buster Poole; 24 Will Walls; rookies in italics

== Standings ==
NFL Eastern Division
	W	L	T	PCT	DIV	PF	PA	STK
New York Giants	9	1	1	.900	7–0–1	168	85	W4
Washington Redskins	8	2	1	.800	6–1–1	242	94	L1
Brooklyn Dodgers	4	6	1	.400	3–4–1	108	219	L3
Pittsburgh Pirates	1	9	1	.100	1–7	114	216	W1
Philadelphia Eagles	1	9	1	.100	1–6–1	105	200	L2

Note: Tie games were not officially counted in the standings until 1972.

== See also ==
- List of New York Giants seasons
