= 1939 Cleveland Rams season =

NFL team season

- Head coach: Earl "Dutch" Clark
- Home stadium: Cleveland Municipal Stadium

Results
- Record: 5–5–1 (NFL); 6–5–1 (overall)
- Division place: 4th NFL Western
- Playoffs: Did not qualify

The 1939 Cleveland Rams season was the team's third year with the National Football League and the fourth season in Cleveland.

== Schedule ==
Game	Date	Opponent	Result	Record	Venue	Attendance	Recap	Sources
1	September 15	at **Chicago Bears**	**L** 21–30	0–1	Wrigley Field	10,000	Recap	
2	September 20	at Brooklyn Dodgers	**L** 12–23	0–2	Ebbets Field	12,423	Recap	
3	October 1	at **Green Bay Packers**	**W** 27–24	1–2	City Stadium	9,888	Recap	
4	October 8	**Chicago Bears**	**L** 21–35	1–3	Municipal Stadium	18,209	Recap	
5	October 15	at **Detroit Lions**	**L** 7–15	1–4	Briggs Stadium	30,096	Recap	
6	October 22	at **Chicago Cardinals**	**W** 24–0	2–4	Wrigley Field	10,000	Recap	
7	October 29	Pittsburgh Pirates	**T** 14–14	2–4–1	Municipal Stadium	11,579	Recap	
8	November 5	**Chicago Cardinals**	**W** 14–0	3–4–1	Municipal Stadium	8,378	Recap	
—	November 12	at Columbus Bullies	**W** 22–0	—	Red Bird Stadium	8,000	—	
9	November 19	**Detroit Lions**	**W** 14–3	4–4–1	Municipal Stadium	28,142	Recap	
10	November 26	**Green Bay Packers**	**L** 6–7	4–5–1	Municipal Stadium	30,690	Recap	
11	December 3	Philadelphia Eagles	**W** 35–13	5–5–1	Will Rogers Stadium	9,109	Recap	
Note: Intra-division opponents in **bold.** Non-league game in italics. September 20: Wednesday.

== Roster ==
1939 Cleveland Rams final roster
Backs: 3 Corby Davis FB/LB/K; 14 Johnny Drake FB/LB; 32 Parker Hall RB/CB/P; 24 Bill Lazetich RB/CB; 22 Bill McRaven RB/CB; 4 Doug Russell RB/CB/P; 5 Marty Slovak RB/CB; 10 Gaylon Smith RB/CB; 33 Vic Spadaccini RB/S/K	Linemen/Linebackers: 34 Chet Adams T/DT/K; 25 Lew Bostick G/DG; 17 Chuck Cherundolo C/LB; 37 Red Conkright C/LB; 9 Jerry Dowd C/LB; 20 Moose Dunstan T/DT; 35 Ben Friend T/DT; 1 Tom Hupke G/DG; 11 Art Lewis G/T/DG/DT; 31 Ted Livingston G/T/DG/DT; 30 Barney McGarry G/DG; 27 Ralph Niehaus T/DT; 36 Phil Ragazzo G/DG	Ends/Receivers: 26 Jim Benton; 19 Paul McDonough; 2 Maury Patt; 12 Johnny Wilson; Reserve: 18 Alex Atty G/DG; -- Jack Haden T/DT; 28 Riley Matheson G/DG; 23 Mike Rodak E; rookies in italics

== Standings ==
NFL Western Division
	W	L	T	PCT	DIV	PF	PA	STK
Green Bay Packers	9	2	0	.818	6–2	233	153	W4
Chicago Bears	8	3	0	.727	6–2	298	157	W4
Detroit Lions	6	5	0	.545	4–4	145	150	L4
Cleveland Rams	5	5	1	.500	4–4	195	164	W1
Chicago Cardinals	1	10	0	.091	0–8	84	254	L8

Note: Tie games were not officially counted in the standings until 1972.

NFL Eastern Division
	W	L	T	PCT	DIV	PF	PA	STK
New York Giants	9	1	1	.900	7–0–1	168	85	W4
Washington Redskins	8	2	1	.800	6–1–1	242	94	L1
Brooklyn Dodgers	4	6	1	.400	3–4–1	108	219	L3
Pittsburgh Pirates	1	9	1	.100	1–7	114	216	W1
Philadelphia Eagles	1	9	1	.100	1–6–1	105	200	L2

Note: Tie games were not officially counted in the standings until 1972.
