= 1939 Pittsburgh Pirates (NFL) season =

NFL team season

1939 Pittsburgh Pirates season
- Owner: Art Rooney
- Head coach: Johnny Blood, Walt Kiesling
- Home stadium: Forbes Field

Results
- Record: 1–9–1
- Division place: 4th (tied) NFL Eastern
- Playoffs: Did not qualify
- Pro Bowlers: Byron Gentry

The 1939 Pittsburgh Pirates season was the franchise's seventh season as a professional football club in the National Football League (NFL). The Pirates brought Johnny Blood back for his third year, however, after finishing with a 2–9 record, Owner Art Rooney provided him with support by signing Walt Kiesling during the offseason. Despite this, the Pirates experienced their worst season yet, placing last in the league with a 1–9–1 record. The team just barely tallied a number in the win column, but during Week 11, they beat the Philadelphia Eagles. It was their first win at home in 9 games at Forbes Field (Week 10, 1937). It was also the final season for the franchise before becoming the "Steelers" the following season.

== Offseason ==
=== 1939 NFL draft ===
Pittsburgh Pirates 1939 NFL Draft selections
Draft order			Player name	Position	College	Notes
Round	Choice	Overall	Player name	Position	College	Notes
1	2	2	Sidney "Sid" Luckman	Quarterback	Columbia	Traded pick to Chicago
2	1	11	Clarence "Pug" Manders	Fullback	Drake	Traded pick to Brooklyn
3	2	17	Billy Patterson	Back	Baylor	Played 1 season for Steelers in 1940
4	1	26	Hugh McCullough	Defensive back	Pittsburgh	Played 1 season for Pirates in 1939
5	2	32	Ernie Wheeler	Back	North Dakota State	Played for Cards and Steelers in 1939
6	1	41	Sam Boyd	End	Baylor	Played 3 seasons for Pirates/Steelers
7	2	52	Eddie Palumbo	Back	Detroit	
8	1	61	Ole Nelson	End	Michigan State	
9	2	72	Steve Petro	Guard	Pittsburgh	Played for Dodgers
10	1	81	Jack Lee	Back	Carnegie Mellon	
11	2	92	Lou Tomasetti	Back	Bucknell	
12	1	101	Denny Cochran	Back	Saint Louis	Played 3 seasons for Pirates/Steelers
13	2	112	Fabian Hoffman	End	Pittsburgh	
14	1	121	Ed Clary	Back	South Carolina	
15	2	132	John Tosi	Center	Niagara	
16	1	141	Al Lezouski	Guard	Pittsburgh	
17	2	152	Ed Longhi	Center	Notre Dame	
18	1	161	Dave Shirk	End	Kansas	
19	2	172	Frank Peters	End	Washington	
20	1	181	Tom Sheldrake	End	Washington	

Pittsburgh's 1939 Draft (like many of the Steelers drafts from these days) was useless. The one player that played longer 1 season was Sam Boyd who played just 3 seasons for the Pirates/Steelers. The Pirates also traded their first two picks to Chicago and Brooklyn. The Bears would draft future Hall of Famer, QB Sid Luckman, and the Dodgers would select Clarence "Pug" Manders who eventually played 9 years of pro ball.

== Regular season ==
=== Schedule ===
Game	Date	Opponent	Result	Record	Venue	Recap
1	September 14	at **Brooklyn Dodgers**	**L** 7–12	0–1	Ebbets Field	Recap
2	September 24	Chicago Cardinals	**L** 0–10	0–2	Forbes Field	Recap
3	October 2	Chicago Bears	**L** 0–32	0–3	Forbes Field	Recap
4	October 8	**New York Giants**	**L** 7–14	0–4	Forbes Field	Recap
5	October 15	at **Washington Redskins**	**L** 14–44	0–5	Griffith Stadium	Recap
6	October 22	**Washington Redskins**	**L** 14–21	0–6	Forbes Field	Recap
7	October 29	at Cleveland Rams	**T** 14–14	0–6–1	Cleveland Municipal Stadium	Recap
8	November 6	at **Brooklyn Dodgers**	**L** 13–17	0–7–1	Ebbets Field	Recap
9	November 19	at **New York Giants**	**L** 7–23	0–8–1	Polo Grounds	Recap
10	November 23	at **Philadelphia Eagles**	**L** 14–17	0–9–1	Philadelphia Municipal Stadium	Recap
11	November 26	**Philadelphia Eagles**	**W** 24–12	1–9–1	Forbes Field	Recap
Note: Intra-division opponents are in **bold** text.

=== Game summaries ===
==== Week 1 (Thursday September 14, 1939): Brooklyn Dodgers ====
	1	2	3	4	Total
Pirates	0	7	0	0	**7**
**Dodgers**	3	7	0	2	**12**

at Ebbets Field, Brooklyn, New York

- Game time:
- Game weather:
- Game attendance: 19,444
- Referee:

Scoring Drives:

- Brooklyn – FG Kercheval 27
- Pittsburgh – Platukis 30 pass from Wheeler (Niccolai kick)
- Brooklyn – Parker 10 run (Kinard kick)
- Brooklyn – Safety, Wheeler tackled in end zone by Hill

==== Week 2 (Sunday, September 24, 1939): Chicago Cardinals ====
	1	2	3	4	Total
**Cardinals**	7	0	0	3	**10**
Pirates	0	0	0	0	**0**

at Forbes Field, Pittsburgh, Pennsylvania

- Game time:
- Game weather:
- Game attendance: 19,008
- Referee:

Scoring Drives:

- Chicago Cardinals – Goldberg 4 run (Monahan kick)
- Chicago Cardinals – FG Monahan 32

==== Week 3 (Monday October 2, 1939): Chicago Bears ====
	1	2	3	4	Total
**Bears**	0	13	13	6	**32**
Pirates	0	0	0	0	**0**

at Forbes Field, Pittsburgh, Pennsylvania

- Game time:
- Game weather:
- Game attendance: 10,325
- Referee:

Scoring Drives:

- Chicago Bears – Omanski 21 run (Stydahar kick)
- Chicago Bears – Manske 24 pass from Masterson (kick failed)
- Chicago Bears – Maniaci 75 run (kick failed)
- Chicago Bears – Maniaci 4 run (Manders kick)
- Chicago Bears – MacLeod 29 pass from Patterson (kick failed)

Between this game and the next, the Pirates shoehorned in a midseason exhibition game against the McKeesport Olympics, in McKeesport on October 4. The Pirates won that game, 9–6.

==== Week 4 (Sunday October 8, 1939): New York Giants ====
	1	2	3	4	Total
**Giants**	0	0	14	0	**14**
Pirates	0	7	0	0	**7**

at Forbes Field, Pittsburgh, Pennsylvania

- Game time:
- Game weather:
- Game attendance: 9,663
- Referee:

Scoring Drives:

- Pittsburgh – Johnson 1 run (Niccolai kick)
- New York – Cuff 20 pass from Danowski (Cuff kick)
- New York – Cuff 5 pass from Danowski (Cuff kick)

==== Week 5 (Sunday October 15, 1939): Washington Redskins ====
	1	2	3	4	Total
Pirates	7	7	0	0	**14**
**Redskins**	13	6	19	6	**44**

at Griffith Stadium, Washington, DC

- Game time:
- Game weather:
- Game attendance: 25,982
- Referee:

Scoring Drives:

- Washington – German 15 run (kick failed)
- Pittsburgh – Francis run (Niccolai kick)
- Washington – German 14 run (Russell kick)
- Pittsburgh – McDonough 3 pass from Tomasetti (Niccolai kick)
- Washington – Farkas 11 run (kick blocked)
- Washington – Farkas 99 pass from Filchock (kick failed)
- Washington – Todd 19 pass from Filchock (Todd kick)
- Washington – Todd 60 run (kick failed)
- Washington – Justice 33 run (kick failed)

==== Week 6 (Sunday October 22, 1939): Washington Redskins ====
	1	2	3	4	Total
**Redskins**	14	0	7	0	**21**
Pirates	0	7	0	7	**14**

at Forbes Field, Pittsburgh, Pennsylvania

- Game time:
- Game weather:
- Game attendance: 8,602
- Referee:

Scoring Drives:

- Washington – Millner 56 pass from Filchock (Russell kick)
- Washington – Farkas 40 pass from Filchock (Russell kick)
- Pittsburgh – Boyd pass from McDonough (Niccolai kick)
- Washington – Irwin 25 run (Farkas kick)
- Pittsburgh – Brumbaugh pass from McDonough (Niccolai kick)

==== Week 7 (Sunday October 29, 1939): Cleveland Rams ====
	1	2	3	4	Total
Pirates	0	7	7	0	**14**
Rams	7	0	0	7	**14**

at Cleveland Municipal Stadium, Cleveland, Ohio

- Game time:
- Game weather:
- Game attendance: 11,579
- Referee:

Scoring Drives:

- Cleveland – Hall 88 run (Spadaccini kick)
- Pittsburgh – McCullough 9 run (Niccolai kick)
- Pittsburgh – Boyd 27 pass from McCullough (Niccolai kick)
- Cleveland – Drake 3 run (Spadaccini kick)

==== Week 8 (Monday November 6, 1939): Brooklyn Dodgers ====
	1	2	3	4	Total
Pirates	0	3	3	7	**13**
**Dodgers**	0	7	7	3	**17**

at Ebbets Field, Brooklyn, New York

- Game time:
- Game weather:
- Game attendance: 8,951
- Referee:

Scoring Drives:

- Brooklyn – Schwartz 9 pass from Parker (Kinard kick)
- Pittsburgh – FG Niccolai 25
- Pittsburgh – FG Niccolai 37
- Brooklyn – Parker 28 run (Kinard kick)
- Brooklyn – FG Parker 28
- Pittsburgh – Sortet 22 pass from McCullough (Niccolai kick)

==== Week 9 (Sunday November 19, 1939): New York Giants ====
	1	2	3	4	Total
Pirates	0	0	0	7	**7**
**Giants**	7	7	3	7	**24**

at Polo Grounds, New York, NY

- Game time:
- Game weather:
- Game attendance: 19,372
- Referee:

Scoring Drives:

- New York – Soar 2 run (Strong kick)
- New York – FG Barnum 37
- New York – FG Barnum 28
- New York – FG Strong 24
- Pittsburgh – Brumbaugh 19 run (Niccolai kick)
- New York – Miller 21 run (Barnum kick)

==== Week 10 (Thursday November 23, 1939): Philadelphia Eagles ====
	1	2	3	4	Total
Pirates	0	0	0	14	**14**
**Eagles**	0	7	3	7	**17**

at Shibe Park, Philadelphia, Pennsylvania

- Game time:
- Game weather:
- Game attendance: 20,000
- Referee:

Scoring Drives:

- Philadelphia – Carter 65 pass from O'Brien (Murray kick)
- Philadelphia – FG Murray 32
- Pittsburgh – Brumbaugh 1 run (Niccolai kick)

==== Week 11 (Sunday November 26, 1939): Philadelphia Eagles ====
	1	2	3	4	Total
Eagles	0	0	6	6	**12**
**Pirates**	3	14	7	0	**24**

at Forbes Field, Pittsburgh, Pennsylvania

- Game time:
- Game weather:
- Game attendance: 8,788
- Referee:

Scoring Drives:

- Pittsburgh – FG Niccolai 28
- Pittsburgh – Johnston 2 run (Niccolai kick)
- Pittsburgh – Tomasetti 1 run (Niccolai kick)
- Pittsburgh – Platukis 37 pss from Brumbaugh (Niccolai kick)
- Philadelphia – O'Brien 2 run (kick blocked)
- Philadelphia – Bukant 3 run (kick blocked)

== Roster ==
1939 Pittsburgh Pirates final roster
Backs: 55 Rink Bond RB/S; 10 Boyd Brumbaugh FB/LB; 19 Edgar Cherry FB/LB; 12 Bill Davidson RB/CB; 27 Swede Johnston FB/LB/P; 26 Carl Littlefield FB/LB; 25 Hugh McCullough RB/CB; 45 Coley McDonough RB/CB; 35 Karl Schuelke FB/LB; 21 Lou Tomasetti RB/CB; Ends/Receivers: 42 Sam Boyd; 33 George Platukis; 24 Bernie Scherer; 20 Bill Sortet	Linemen/Linebackers: 29 Don Campbell T/DT; 28 Ted Doyle T/DT; 39 Len Dugan C/LB; 18 Byron Gentry G/DG; 11 Ted Grabinski C/LB; 14 George Kakasic G/DG; 36 Ed Karpowich T/DT; 22 Joe Maras C/LB; 23 Lou Midler G/T/DG/DT; 17 Armand Niccolai T/DT/K; Rookies in italics

== Standings ==
NFL Eastern Division
	W	L	T	PCT	DIV	PF	PA	STK
New York Giants	9	1	1	.900	7–0–1	168	85	W4
Washington Redskins	8	2	1	.800	6–1–1	242	94	L1
Brooklyn Dodgers	4	6	1	.400	3–4–1	108	219	L3
Pittsburgh Pirates	1	9	1	.100	1–7	114	216	W1
Philadelphia Eagles	1	9	1	.100	1–6–1	105	200	L2

Note: Tie games were not officially counted in the standings until 1972.
