= Paul Kell =

American football player (1915–1977)

No. 41
- Position: Tackle

Personal information
- Born: July 8, 1915; Princeton, Indiana, U.S.
- Died: May 18, 1977 (aged 61); Eau Claire, Wisconsin, U.S.
- Listed height: 6 ft 2 in (1.88 m)
- Listed weight: 217 lb (98 kg)

Career information
- High school: Niles (MI)
- College: Notre Dame (1935-1938)
- NFL draft: 1939: 8th round, 69th overall pick

Career history
- Green Bay Packers (1939–1940)

Awards and highlights
- NFL champion (1939); Pro Bowl (1939)

Career NFL statistics
- Games played: 20
- Stats at Pro Football Reference

Paul Ernest Kell (July 8, 1915 – May 18, 1977) was a player in the National Football League (NFL).

== Biography ==
Kell was born on July 8, 1915, in Princeton, Indiana. He graduated from University of Notre Dame in 1939. He died on May 18, 1977, at Luther Hospital, Eau Claire, Wisconsin. He was survived by his wife, his four sons, and his five grandchildren.

== Career ==
Kell was drafted by the Green Bay Packers in the eighth round of the 1939 NFL draft and played two seasons with the team. As such, he was a member of the 1939 NFL Champion Packers.

He played at the collegiate level at the University of Notre Dame.
