= List of Saint Mary's Gaels in the NFL draft =

This is a list of Saint Mary's Gaels football players in the NFL draft.

== Key ==
B	Back	K	Kicker	NT	Nose tackle
C	Center	LB	Linebacker	FB	Fullback
DB	Defensive back	P	Punter	HB	Halfback
DE	Defensive end	QB	Quarterback	WR	Wide receiver
DT	Defensive tackle	RB	Running back	G	Guard
E	End	T	Offensive tackle	TE	Tight end

= Pro Bowler
= Hall of Famer

== Selections ==
Year	Round	Pick	Overall	Player	Team	Position
1936	3	4	22	Wagner Jorgensen	Brooklyn Dodgers	C
1936	3	5	23	Eddie Erdelatz	Chicago Cardinals	E
1936	7	4	58	Herb Schreiber	Brooklyn Dodgers	B
1937	3	4	24	Jerry Dennerlein	New York Giants	C
1937	8	5	75	Marty Kordick	Pittsburgh Pirates	E
1938	12	9	109	Tony Falkenstein	Green Bay Packers	HB
1939	4	3	28	Wally Garard	Cleveland Rams	T
1939	7	3	53	Jerry Dowd	Cleveland Rams	C
1939	17	3	153	Mike Perrie	Cleveland Rams	B
1940	10	5	85	Herb Smith	Cleveland Rams	B
1940	19	5	175	Dante Magnani	Cleveland Rams	B
1941	11	10	100	Joe Aguirre	Washington Redskins	E
1941	12	7	107	Andy Marefos	New York Giants	B
1941	13	7	117	Ed Heffernan	Green Bay Packers	B
1942	16	4	144	George Arabian	Chicago Cardinals	B
1943	7	7	57	Al Ratto	Pittsburgh Steelers	C
1943	8	7	67	Ray Curry	Pittsburgh Steelers	E
1943	18	8	168	Jim Powers	Green Bay Packers	T
1943	21	5	195	Tom Coll	Cleveland Rams	E
1943	21	7	197	Tony Compagno	Pittsburgh Steelers	B
1944	1	10	10	Johnny Podesto	Pittsburgh Steelers	B
1944	5	6	38	Bill McPartland	Green Bay Packers	T
1944	10	7	94	Bob Sneddon	Washington Redskins	B
1944	12	6	115	Roy Giusti	Green Bay Packers	B
1944	20	3	200	Ray Ahlstrom	Detroit Lions	B
1944	20	11	208	Tony Bilotti	Boston Yanks	G
1944	25	3	255	Bob McCarthy	Detroit Lions	E
1944	25	8	260	Roy Ruskusky	Chicago Bears	E
1945	7	9	63	Gonzalo Morales	Philadelphia Eagles	B
1945	22	8	227	Jack Verutti	Detroit Lions	B
1945	22	11	230	Fred Neilsen	Green Bay Packers	T
1947	1	9	9	Herman Wedemeyer	Los Angeles Rams	B
1948	9	8	73	Ed Ryan	Pittsburgh Steelers	E
1948	24	2	217	Joe Suarez	Detroit Lions	OG
1950	14	12	182	Packard Harrington	Cleveland Browns	C
1950	22	2	276	R. V. Johnson	New York Bulldogs	T
1951	26	8	311	Will Sherman	New York Bulldogs	B
1983	9	25	249	Kent Jordan	Los Angeles Raiders	TE
1984	5	4	116	Andre Hardy	Philadelphia Eagles	RB
1984	11	2	282	Garner Williams	Los Angeles Raiders	DB
