= Henry Adams (American football) =

American football player (1915–2005)

No. 16
- Position: Center

Personal information
- Born: December 24, 1915; California, Pennsylvania, U.S.
- Died: October 28, 2005 (aged 89); California, Pennsylvania, U.S.
- Listed height: 6 ft 1 in (1.85 m)
- Listed weight: 190 lb (86 kg)

Career information
- High school: California (Coal Center, Pennsylvania)
- College: Pittsburgh (1934–1937)
- NFL draft: 1939: undrafted

Career history
- Chicago Cardinals (1939); East Chicago Indians (1939)

Awards and highlights
- National champion (1937)

Career NFL statistics
- Games played: 3
- Games played: 1
- Stats at Pro Football Reference

Henry Adams (December 24, 1915 – October 28, 2005) was an American professional football center who played one season with the Chicago Cardinals of the National Football League (NFL). He played college football at the University of Pittsburgh.

== Early life and college ==
Henry Adams was born on December 24, 1915, in California, Pennsylvania. He attended California Area High School in Coal Center, Pennsylvania.

He was a member of the Pittsburgh Panthers football team from 1934 to 1937 and a three-year letterman from 1935 to 1937. The 1937 Panthers were consensus national champions.

== Professional career ==
Adams signed with the Chicago Cardinals of the National Football League in 1939. He played in the Cardinals' first three games of the 1939 season, starting one, before being released by the team on September 27, 1939.

He then played in three games for the East Chicago Indians of the American Professional Football Association during their 1939 season.

== Personal life ==
Adams spent time in the United States Army. He was also a school gym teacher. He died on October 28, 2005, in California, Pennsylvania.
