= Mario Tonelli =

American football player (1916–2003)

No. 58
- Position: Fullback

Personal information
- Born: March 28, 1916; Lemont, Illinois, U.S.
- Died: January 7, 2003 (aged 86); Chicago, Illinois, U.S.
- Listed height: 5 ft 11 in (1.80 m)
- Listed weight: 200 lb (91 kg)

Career information
- College: Notre Dame
- NFL draft: 1939: 21st round, 195th overall pick

Career history
- Chicago Cardinals (1940)

Career NFL statistics
- Rushing yards: 148
- Rushing average: 2.9
- Receptions: 5
- Receiving yards: 53
- Total touchdowns: 1
- Stats at Pro Football Reference

Mario George Tonelli (March 27, 1916 – January 7, 2003) was an American professional football player who played running back for one season for the Chicago Cardinals. He was drafted 195th overall in the 21st round of the 1939 NFL Draft.

A staff sergeant in the US Army 200th Coast Artillery who survived the Bataan Death March, during the Death March his Notre Dame class ring was stolen by a Japanese guard. Miraculously it was returned by an English speaking Japanese Officer who had been educated at the University of Southern California and had seen Tonelli score the winning touchdown in the 1937 game between the two schools. Tonelli later buried the ring in a metal soap dish beneath his prison barracks to confound would be thieves. Later he was transferred to Davao Penal Colony "Dapecol." Of the 2,009 estimated total number of POWs that were in Dapecol during its existence from October 1942 – June 1944 only 805 would survive the war. He had the nickname "Motts" while in the Army and as a Prisoner of war.
