= Jack Lee (American football) =

American football player (1917–1972)

No. 16
- Position: Back

Personal information
- Born: March 28, 1917; Atlasburg, Pennsylvania, U.S.
- Died: July 13, 1972 (aged 55)
- Listed height: 5 ft 10 in (1.78 m)
- Listed weight: 205 lb (93 kg)

Career information
- High school: Coneburg
- College: Carnegie Mellon
- NFL draft: 1939: 10th round, 81st overall pick

Career history
- Pittsburgh Pirates (1939)

Career NFL statistics
- Punts: 1
- Punting yards: 44
- Stats at Pro Football Reference

John Lee (March 28, 1917 – July 13, 1972) was an American professional football player who was a blocking back for one season with the Pittsburgh Pirates of the National Football League (NFL). He was selected by the Pirates in the 10th round of the 1939 NFL draft. He played college football for the Carnegie Mellon Tartans.
