= Karl Schuelke =

American football player (1914–1992)

No. 35
- Position: Fullback

Personal information
- Born: September 5, 1914; Marshfield, Wisconsin, U.S.
- Died: February 18, 1992 (aged 77); Wausau, Wisconsin, U.S.
- Listed height: 5 ft 10 in (1.78 m)
- Listed weight: 200 lb (91 kg)

Career information
- High school: McKinley (Marshfield, Wisconsin)
- College: Wisconsin

Career history
- Pittsburgh Pirates (1939)

Career statistics
- Rushing attempts: 2
- Rushing yards: 2
- Stats at Pro Football Reference

Karl Schuelke (September 5, 1914 – February 18, 1992) was a fullback in the National Football League (NFL). He was a member of the Pittsburgh Pirates during the 1939 NFL season.
