= Rankin Britt =

American football player (1915–2001)

No. 18, 42
- Position: End

Personal information
- Born: April 11, 1915; Erath County, Texas, U.S.
- Died: March 5, 2001 (aged 85); Ranger, Texas, U.S.
- Listed height: 6 ft 2 in (1.88 m)
- Listed weight: 205 lb (93 kg)

Career information
- High school: Ranger
- College: Texas A&M (1935-1938)
- NFL draft: 1939: 9th round, 74th overall pick

Career history
- Philadelphia Eagles (1939); Wilmington Clippers (1939)

Career NFL statistics
- Games played: 1
- Stats at Pro Football Reference

Adolphus Rankin Britt (April 11, 1915 – March 5, 2001) was an American professional football player who was an end for one season with the Philadelphia Eagles of the National Football League (NFL) in 1939. He played college football for the Texas A&M Aggies and he was selected by the Eagles in the ninth round of the 1939 NFL draft.

Britt later served as a police officer and a member of the city council in Ranger, Texas. He also coached football in Ranger and in Waco, Texas. He also served in the Air Force from 1945 to 1970.
