= Alex Atty =

American football player (1916–1973)

No. 18
- Position: Guard

Personal information
- Born: December 8, 1916; Johnstown, Pennsylvania, U.S.
- Died: May 3, 1973 (aged 56); Pottsville, Pennsylvania, U.S.
- Listed height: 5 ft 8 in (1.73 m)
- Listed weight: 216 lb (98 kg)

Career information
- High school: Johnstown
- College: West Virginia (1935-1938)
- NFL draft: 1939: 18th round, 163rd overall pick

Career history
- Cleveland Rams (1939); Detroit Lions (1941)*
- * Offseason or practice squad member only

Career NFL statistics
- Games played: 3
- Stats at Pro Football Reference

Alexander George Atty (December 8, 1916 – May 3, 1973) was an American professional football offensive lineman in the National Football League for the Cleveland Rams. He played one season in 1939, and was drafted out of West Virginia in 1939. He is also listed on the all-time roster of the Detroit Lions as a guard in 1941. He was born in Johnstown, Pennsylvania.

Atty graduated with a Master of Science degree from West Virginia in 1940, and earned a Doctor of Education from Pennsylvania State University in 1964.
