= Jake Schuehle =

American football player (1917–2001)

No. 38
- Position: Halfback

Personal information
- Born: September 28, 1917; Hondo, Texas, U.S.
- Died: January 8, 2001 (aged 83); D'Hanis, Texas, U.S.
- Listed height: 6 ft 0 in (1.83 m)
- Listed weight: 196 lb (89 kg)

Career information
- High school: Hondo
- College: Rice
- NFL draft: 1939: 6th round, 44th overall pick

Career history
- Philadelphia Eagles (1939)

Career NFL statistics
- Games played: 2
- Stats at Pro Football Reference

Charles John "Jake" Schuehle, Jr. (September 28, 1917 – January 8, 2001) was an American professional football player who was a halfback for the Philadelphia Eagles of the National Football League (NFL) for one season in 1939. He played college football for the Rice Owls and he was selected by the Eagles in the sixth round of the 1939 NFL draft.
