= 1939 Detroit Lions season =

National Football League team season

- Head coach: Gus Henderson
- Home stadium: Titans Stadium and Briggs Stadium

Results
- Record: 6–5
- Division place: 3rd NFL Western
- Playoffs: Did not qualify

The 1939 Detroit Lions season was their tenth in the league. The team failed to improve on their previous season's output of 7–4, winning only six games. They failed to qualify for the playoffs for the fourth consecutive season.

== Offseason ==
=== Draft ===
1939 Detroit Lions draft
Round	Pick	Player	Position	College	Notes
1	7	Johnny Pingel	TB	Michigan State	
3	22	Howie Weiss	FB	Wisconsin	
5	37	Steve Maronic	T	North Carolina	
6	47	Joe Wendlick	T	Oregon State	
7	57	Darrell Tully	TB	Texas A&M Commerce	
8	67	Dick Trzuskowski	T	Idaho	
9	77	Bill Callihan	B	Nebraska	
10	87	Ray George	T	USC	
11	97	Tony Calvelli	C	Stanford	
12	107	Jim Coughlan	E	Santa Clara	
13	117	Prescott Hutchins	G	Oregon State	
14	127	Art Means	G	Washington	
15	137	Gene Hodge	E	Texas A&M-Commerce	
16	147	Bill Lazetich	WB	Montana	
17	157	Ralph Niehaus	T	Dayton	
18	167	Dutch Niemant	B	New Mexico	
19	177	Tony Tonelli	C	USC	
20	187	Jim McDonald	C	Illinois	
21	192	Merrill Waters	E	BYU	
22	197	Al Howe	T	Xavier	
Made roster † Pro Football Hall of Fame

== Roster ==
1939 Detroit Lions final roster
Backs: 21 Elvin Hutchinson HB; 3 Lloyd Cardwell WB/CB; 1 Johnny Pingel RB/QB/P; 20 Jim McDonald B; 36 Dwight Sloan QB/TB; 25 Hal Brill RB/S; 20 Jim McDonald RB/CB; 5 Howie Weiss RB/CB; 22 Fred Vanzo RB/BB; 9 Bill Shepherd RB/S/K; 22 Fred Vanzo RB/CB; 4 Darrell Tully QB/TB/DB; 8 Paul Szakash E/BB/FB; 34 Phil Martinovich FB/G	Linemen/Linebackers: 64 Steve Maronic T; 26 Bill Feldhaus G/DG; 13 John Wiatrak C; 16 Jack Johnson T/DT; 78 Socko Wiethe LG/MG; 19 Regis Monahan G/DG/K; 75 Cal Thomas G/DG; 28 Bill Radovich G/DG; 55 Ray Clemons G; 18 Bill Rogers T/DT; 17 Dixie Stokes C/LB; 14 Ray George RT; 15 Tony Tonelli C; 66 Tony Calvelli C/G; 30 Alex Wojciechowicz C/LB	Ends/Receivers: 35 Bill Moore E/DE; 12 Chuck Hanneman RE / K; 11 Monk Moscrip LE / K; 29 Jim Austin E; 32 Dave Diehl E; 83 Connie Mack Berry E; rookies in italics

== Schedule ==
Week	Date	Opponent	Result	Record	Venue	Recap
1	September 10	**Chicago Cardinals**	**W** 21–13	1–0	University of Detroit Stadium	Recap
2	Bye					
3	September 24	Brooklyn Dodgers	**W** 27–7	2–0	University of Detroit Stadium	Recap
4	October 1	at **Chicago Cardinals**	**W** 17–3	3–0	Soldier Field	Recap
5	Bye					
6	October 15	**Cleveland Rams**	**W** 15–7	4–0	University of Detroit Stadium	Recap
7	October 22	at **Green Bay Packers**	**L** 7–26	4–1	City Stadium	Recap
8	October 29	at **Chicago Bears**	**W** 10–0	5–1	Wrigley Field	Recap
9	November 5	New York Giants	**W** 18–14	6–1	Briggs Stadium	Recap
10	November 12	**Chicago Bears**	**L** 13–23	6–2	Briggs Stadium	Recap
11	November 19	at **Cleveland Rams**	**L** 3–14	6–3	Cleveland Municipal Stadium	Recap
12	November 26	at Washington Redskins	**L** 7–31	6–4	Griffith Stadium	Recap
13	December 3	**Green Bay Packers**	**L** 7–12	6–5	Briggs Stadium	Recap

Note: Intra-division opponents are in bold text.

== Standings ==
NFL Western Division
	W	L	T	PCT	DIV	PF	PA	STK
Green Bay Packers	9	2	0	.818	6–2	233	153	W4
Chicago Bears	8	3	0	.727	6–2	298	157	W4
Detroit Lions	6	5	0	.545	4–4	145	150	L4
Cleveland Rams	5	5	1	.500	4–4	195	164	W1
Chicago Cardinals	1	10	0	.091	0–8	84	254	L8

Note: Tie games were not officially counted in the standings until 1972.
