= Tony Tonelli =

American football player (1917–1987)

No. 15
- Positions: Center, Guard

Personal information
- Born: September 1, 1917; Wheeling, West Virginia, U.S.
- Died: January 30, 1987 (aged 69); Newport Beach, California, U.S.
- Listed height: 6 ft 0 in (1.83 m)
- Listed weight: 210 lb (95 kg)

Career information
- High school: Thomas (Wheeling)
- College: USC (1935-1938)
- NFL draft: 1939: 19th round, 177th overall pick

Career history
- Detroit Lions (1939)

Career NFL statistics
- Games played: 9
- Stats at Pro Football Reference

Amerigo Steven "Tony" Tonelli (September 1, 1917 – January 30, 1987) was an American professional football player.

Tonelli was born in Wheeling, West Virginia, in 1917. He attended Thomas High School in West Virginia. He next enrolled at the University of Southern California and played at the center position for the USC Trojans football team from 1935 to 1938. He returned from a knee injury sustained during the 1938 season to play for USC in the 1939 Rose Bowl. He went on to block a punt in the Rose Bowl.

He was selected by the Detroit Lions with the 177th pick in the 1939 NFL draft. He appeared in nine games as a center and guard for the Lions during the 1939 season.

After his playing career ended, Tonelli worked for a time as a coach. He then joined the United States Air Force and attained the rank of lieutenant colonel. He died in 1987 in Newport Beach, California, at age 69.
