= Eddie Miller (quarterback) =

American football player (1916–2000)

No. 9
- Position: Quarterback

Personal information
- Born: February 17, 1916; Muskogee, Oklahoma, U.S.
- Died: November 9, 2000 (aged 84); Roswell, New Mexico, U.S.

Career information
- College: New Mexico State

Career history
- New York Giants (1939–1940)

Career statistics
- TD–INT: 6-9
- Yards: 700
- QB rating: 55.9

Edward Miller (February 17, 1916 – November 9, 2000) was an American football quarterback in the National Football League (NFL). He played for the New York Giants. He played college football for the New Mexico State Aggies.
