= Bree Cuppoletti =

American football player (1910–1960)

Bruno "Bree" Cuppoletti
No. Chicago Cardinals 47, Philadelphia Eagles 37
- Position: Guard

Personal information
- Born: June 19, 1910; Virginia, Minnesota, U.S.
- Died: September 22, 1960 (aged 50); Virginia, Minnesota, U.S.
- Listed height: 5 ft 10 in (1.78 m)
- Listed weight: 200 lb (91 kg)

Career information
- High school: Roosevelt High School
- College: Oregon

Career history
- Chicago Cardinals (1934–1938); Philadelphia Eagles (1939)
- Stats at Pro Football Reference

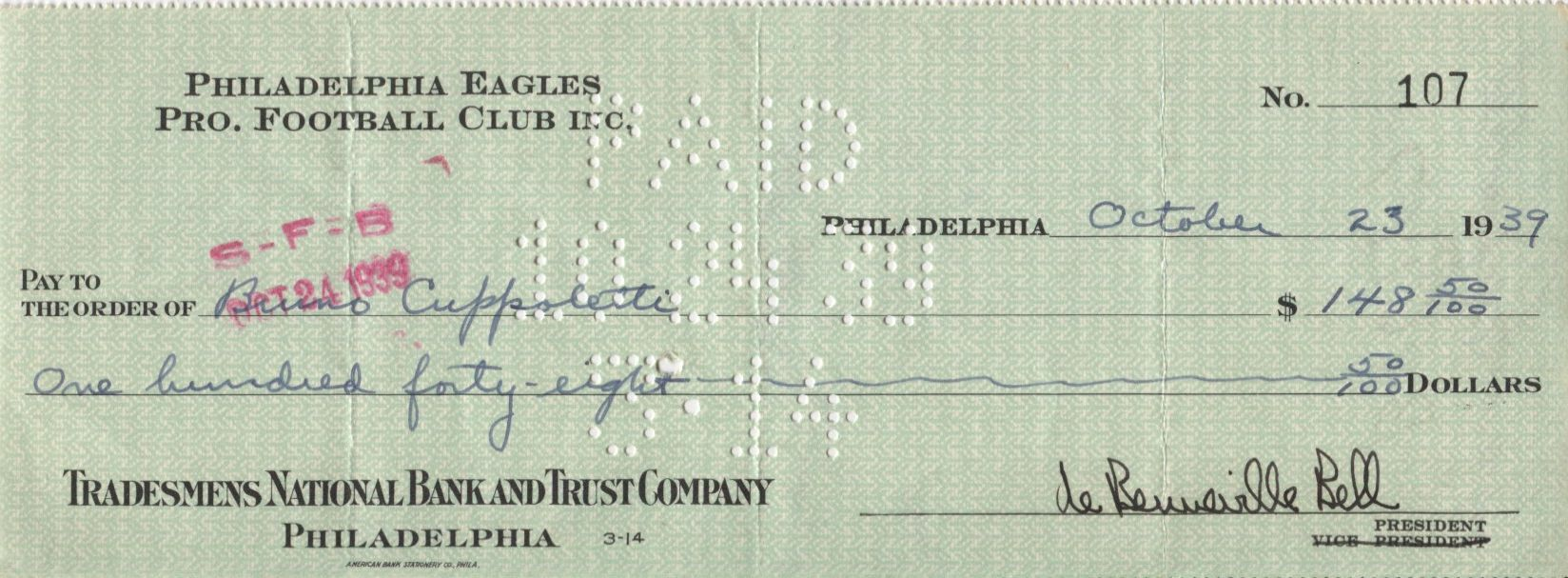

Rudolph Bruno "Bree" Cuppoletti (born June 19, 1910 – September 22, 1960) was an American professional football player who played guard for six seasons for the Chicago Cardinals and Philadelphia Eagles of the National Football League.

== Family ==
- Wife: Catherine Alice (Watson) Cuppoletti (d.1970).
- Children: Barbara Lynn, Brenda "Sue" Krall (d.2002), Ralph Cuppoletti, Cathy Jo Cuppoletti Smith (d.2016), Terri Ann Cuppoletti
- Grandchildren: 13
