= 1939 Brooklyn Dodgers (NFL) season =

National Football League team season

1939 Brooklyn Dodgers season
- Owner: Dan Topping
- Head coach: Potsy Clark
- Home stadium: Ebbets Field

Results
- Record: 4–6–1
- Division place: 3rd NFL Eastern
- Playoffs: Did not qualify

The 1939 Brooklyn Dodgers season was their tenth in the National Football League (NFL). The team failed to improve on their previous season's output of 4–4–3, losing six games. They failed to qualify for the playoffs for the eighth consecutive season. The October 22 game against Philadelphia was the first NFL game to be televised.

== NFL draft ==
1939 Brooklyn Dodgers draft
Round	Pick	Player	Position	College	Notes
1	5	Bob MacLeod	Back	Dartmouth	Played with the Chicago Bears
2	11	Clarence "Pug" Manders *	Fullback	Drake	
2	15	Bob Haak	Guard	Indiana	
3	20	Waddy Young	End	Oklahoma	
4	30	Vic Bottari	Back	California	
5	35	Jack Kinnison	Center	Missouri	
6	45	Len Janiak	Back	Ohio	
6	46	Ed Beinor *	Tackle	Notre Dame	
7	55	Alex Schoenbaum	Tackle	Ohio State	
8	65	Dan "Tiger" Hill	Center	Duke	
9	75	Forrest Kline	Guard	TCU	
10	85	Kimble Bradley	Back	Ole Miss	
11	95	George Lenc	End	Augustana (IL)	
12	105	Ralph Heikkinen	Guard	Michigan	
12	109	Carl Kaplanoff	Guard	Ohio State	
13	115	George Gembis	Back	Wayne State (MI)	
14	125	Ray Carnelly	Back	Carnegie Tech	
15	135	Lou Trunzo	Guard	Wake Forest	
16	145	Charley Gross	Guard	Bradley	
17	155	John Siegal *	End	Columbia	Played with the Chicago Bears
18	165	Paul Morin	Tackle	Iowa State	
19	175	Ferrell Anderson	Guard	Kansas	
20	185	Tony Popp	End	Toledo	
Made roster * Made at least one Pro Bowl during career

== Schedule ==
Game	Date	Opponent	Result	Record	Venue	Attendance	Recap	Sources
1	September 14	**Pittsburgh Pirates**	**W** 12–7	1–0	Ebbets Field	19,444	Recap	
2	September 20	Cleveland Rams	**W** 23–12	2–0	Ebbets Field	12,423	Recap	
3	September 24	at Detroit Lions	**L** 7–27	2–1	University of Detroit Stadium	15,515	Recap	
4	October 1	at **Philadelphia Eagles**	**T** 0–0	2–1–1	Philadelphia Municipal Stadium	1,880	Recap	
5	October 8	at **Washington Redskins**	**L** 13–41	2–2–1	Griffith Stadium	27,092	Recap	
6	October 22	**Philadelphia Eagles**	**W** 23–14	3–2–1	Ebbets Field	13,057	Recap	
7	October 29	**New York Giants**	**L** 6–7	3–3–1	Ebbets Field	34,032	Recap	
8	November 6	**Pittsburgh Pirates**	**W** 17–13	4–3–1	Ebbets Field	8,951	Recap	
9	November 12	**Washington Redskins**	**L** 0–42	4–4–1	Ebbets Field	28,541	Recap	
10	November 19	Green Bay Packers	**L** 0–28	4–5–1	Ebbets Field	19,843	Recap	
11	November 26	at **New York Giants**	**L** 7–28	4–6–1	Polo Grounds	30,144	Recap	
Note: Intra-division opponents are in **bold** text.

== Roster ==
1939 Brooklyn Dodgers final roster
Backs: 66 Wendell Butcher RB/CB/S; 2 Ray Carnelly RB/CB; 10 Sam Francis FB/LB/P; 11 Ace Gutowsky FB/LB; 3 Len Janiak FB/LB; 1 Ralph Kercheval RB/CB/K/P; 4 Bill Leckonby RB/S; 9 Pug Manders FB/LB; 5 Dick Nardi RB/CB; 7 Ace Parker RB/S/K; Ends/Receivers: 14 Harold Hill; 13 Herman Hodges; 99 Perry Schwartz; 6 Waddy Young	Linemen/Linebackers: 27 Leo Disend T/DT; 17 John Golemgeske G/DG; 19 Bob Haak G/T/DG/DT; 16 Paul Humphrey C/LB; 15 Carl Kaplanoff G/DG/T/DT; 25 Bruiser Kinard T/DT/K; 12 Lou Mark C/LB; 21 Joe Ratica C/G/LB/DG; 29 Alec Shellogg T/DT; 28 Jim Sivell G/DG; Rookies in italics

== Standings ==
NFL Eastern Division
	W	L	T	PCT	DIV	PF	PA	STK
New York Giants	9	1	1	.900	7–0–1	168	85	W4
Washington Redskins	8	2	1	.800	6–1–1	242	94	L1
Brooklyn Dodgers	4	6	1	.400	3–4–1	108	219	L3
Pittsburgh Pirates	1	9	1	.100	1–7	114	216	W1
Philadelphia Eagles	1	9	1	.100	1–6–1	105	200	L2

Note: Tie games were not officially counted in the standings until 1972.
