= Dan Elmer =

American football player and coach (1915–2002)

Biographical details
- Born: December 8, 1915; Minneapolis, Minnesota, U.S.
- Died: March 17, 2002 (aged 86); Hennepin County, Minnesota, U.S.

Playing career
- 1934–1938: Minnesota
- Position: Center

Coaching career (HC unless noted)
- 1939: Augsburg

Head coaching record
- Overall: 0–4

Daniel Thomas Elmer (December 8, 1915 – March 17, 2002) was an American college football player and coach. He served as the head football coach at Augsburg College in 1939 after playing college football for the Minnesota Golden Gophers football team from 1934 to 1938.

Elmer was drafted by the Green Bay Packers in the 1939 NFL draft.

== Head coaching record ==
| Year | Team | Overall | Conference | Standing | Bowl/playoffs |
|---|---|---|---|---|---|
Augsburg Auggies (Independent) (1939)
| 1939 | Augsburg | 0–4 | | | |
| Augsburg: | | 0–4 | | | |
| Total: | | 0–4 | | | |
