= Charles Newton (American football) =

American football player (1916–1994)

No. 40
- Positions: Fullback, halfback

Personal information
- Born: November 15, 1916; Randolph Township, Tippecanoe County, Indiana, U.S.
- Died: April 5, 1994 (aged 77); Seattle, Washington, U.S.
- Listed height: 6 ft 0 in (1.83 m)
- Listed weight: 205 lb (93 kg)

Career information
- High school: Jefferson (Lafayette, Indiana)
- College: Washington
- NFL draft: 1939: 2nd round, 14th overall pick

Career history
- Philadelphia Eagles (1939–1940)

Career NFL statistics
- Receptions: 10
- Receiving yards: 145
- Touchdowns: 1
- Stats at Pro Football Reference

Charles "Chuck" Edward Newton (November 15, 1916 – April 5, 1994) was an American professional football quarterback, running back, and fullback who played two seasons in the National Football League (NFL) for the Philadelphia Eagles. He played college football at the University of Washington and was drafted in the second round of the 1939 NFL draft.

== College ==
Newton was a three-year letterman including at quarterback while at Washington, from 1936 to 1938.
