= 1939 Washington Redskins season =

NFL team season

- Owner: George Preston Marshall
- General manager: Jack Espey
- Head coach: Ray Flaherty
- Home stadium: Griffith Stadium

Results
- Record: 8–2–1
- Division place: 2nd NFL Eastern
- Playoffs: Did not qualify

The 1939 Washington Redskins season was the franchise's 8th season in the National Football League (NFL) and their 3rd in Washington, D.C. It began with the team improved on their 6–3–2 record from 1938, finishing at 8–2–1, but missed the playoff for the second year in a row.

== Schedule ==
Game	Date	Opponent	Result	Record	Venue	Attendance	Recap
1	September 17	at **Philadelphia Eagles**	**W** 7–0	1–0	Municipal Stadium	33,528	Recap
—	Bye						
2	October 1	**New York Giants**	**T** 0–0	1–0–1	Griffith Stadium	34,712	Recap
3	October 8	**Brooklyn Dodgers**	**W** 41–13	2–0–1	Griffith Stadium	27,092	Recap
4	October 15	**Pittsburgh Pirates**	**W** 44–14	3–0–1	Griffith Stadium	25,982	Recap
5	October 22	at **Pittsburgh Pirates**	**W** 21–14	4–0–1	Forbes Field	8,602	Recap
6	October 29	at Green Bay Packers	**L** 14–24	4–1–1	State Fair Park	24,308	Recap
7	November 5	**Philadelphia Eagles**	**W** 7–6	5–1–1	Griffith Stadium	20,444	Recap
8	November 12	at **Brooklyn Dodgers**	**W** 42–0	6–1–1	Ebbets Field	28,581	Recap
9	November 19	Chicago Cardinals	**W** 28–7	7–1–1	Griffith Stadium	26,667	Recap
10	November 26	Detroit Lions	**W** 31–7	8–1–1	Griffith Stadium	36,183	Recap
11	December 3	at **New York Giants**	**L** 7–9	8–2–1	Polo Grounds	62,404	Recap
Note: Intra-division opponents are in **bold** text.

== Roster ==
1939 Washington Redskins final roster
Backs: 33 Sammy Baugh RB/CB/P; 23 Keith Birlem RB/CB; 44 Andy Farkas FB/LB/K; 30 Frank Filchock RB/CB/S; 34 Jim German RB/CB/S; 31 Jimmy Johnston RB/CB/S/P; 13 Ed Justice RB/CB; 49 Jim Meade RB/CB/P; 35 Wilbur Moore FB/LB; 12 Boyd Morgan RB/CB; 11 Erny Pinckert RB/S; 46 John Spirida RB/CB/S/P; 41 Dick Todd RB/CB/P/K; 24 Jay Turner RB/CB	Linemen/Linebackers: 15 Jim Barber T/DT; 26 Vic Carroll C/LB; 17 Turk Edwards T/DT; 21 Dick Farman G/DG; 29 Jim Karcher G/DG; 27 Mickey Parks C/LB; 45 Bo Russell T/DT/K; 51 Clyde Shugart G/DG/T/DT; 16 Steve Slivinski G/DG; 39 Clem Stralka G/DG; 36 Willie Wilkin T/DT; 37 Bill Young G/DG	Ends/Receivers: 19 Charley Malone; 28 Bob Masterson K; 32 Bob McChesney; 40 Wayne Millner; Reserve: 23 Don Irwin RB/CB; rookies in italics

== Standings ==
NFL Eastern Division
	W	L	T	PCT	DIV	PF	PA	STK
New York Giants	9	1	1	.900	7–0–1	168	85	W4
Washington Redskins	8	2	1	.800	6–1–1	242	94	L1
Brooklyn Dodgers	4	6	1	.400	3–4–1	108	219	L3
Pittsburgh Pirates	1	9	1	.100	1–7	114	216	W1
Philadelphia Eagles	1	9	1	.100	1–6–1	105	200	L2

Note: Tie games were not officially counted in the standings until 1972.
