= Walt Nielsen =

American football player (1917–2006)

No. 8
- Position: Fullback

Personal information
- Born: February 4, 1917; Redondo Beach, California, U.S.
- Died: September 22, 2006 (aged 89); Tucson, Arizona, U.S.
- Listed height: 6 ft 3 in (1.91 m)
- Listed weight: 200 lb (91 kg)

Career information
- High school: Redondo Union
- College: Arizona (1935-1938)
- NFL draft: 1939: 1st round, 10th overall pick

Career history
- New York Giants (1940)

Career NFL statistics
- Rushing yards: 269
- Rushing average: 3.7
- Receptions: 2
- Receiving yards: 17
- Total touchdowns: 1
- Stats at Pro Football Reference

Walter Ring Nielsen (February 4, 1917 – September 22, 2006) was an American football fullback who played for the National Football League (NFL)'s New York Giants during the 1940 season.

A native of Redondo Beach, California, Nielsen attracted interest from the Arizona Wildcats and USC Trojans college football teams. Because he believed the Arizona environment would be better for his asthma, he spurned the local Trojans and accepted an athletic scholarship to play for the Wildcats. Nielsen played for Arizona from 1936 to 1938, and gained the nickname "Hoss" early in his career. In his first two years, under head coach Tex Oliver, he joined fellow future NFL running back Tom Greenfield as part of a team known as the "Blue Brigade". The Wildcats had win–loss records of 7–2 and 5–2–3 in those seasons. Nielsen was named to the Little All-American team in 1937, before a knee injury affected him the next year. In 1939, the Giants selected him with the 10th pick in the NFL draft, making him the first Wildcats player to be taken in the first round of a draft.

Although the Giants signed Nielsen in July 1939, he spent the 1939 season as a member of the minor league Jersey City Giants, reportedly due to a case of hay fever. In 1940, Nielsen rushed for 269 yards in 73 attempts during the nine games he played in, and his average of 3.7 yards per carry was ninth in the NFL. In addition, he caught two passes for 17 yards and scored one touchdown. He accounted for the Giants' first score in a 37–21 loss to the Chicago Bears on October 27, with a one-yard run.

After 1940, Nielsen did not play another NFL game. He entered the United States Army, and participated in World War II; two days after the Normandy landings, he entered France via Omaha Beach. One newspaper reported that Nielsen went on to join "in a reconnaissance mission", along with "driving armored cars ahead of the Allied tanks to scout out Nazi positions." Following a period in "private business" later in his life, Nielsen died at the age of 89. Nielsen has been named to Arizona's Football Ring of Honor.
