= Ben Friend =

American football player (1912–1953)

No. 35
- Position: Tackle

Personal information
- Born: January 30, 1912; USA
- Died: November 18, 1953 (aged 41); St. Petersburg, Florida, U.S.
- Listed height: 6 ft 5 in (1.96 m)
- Listed weight: 248 lb (112 kg)

Career information
- High school: Gulfport (MS)
- College: LSU (1935–1938)
- NFL draft: 1939: 15th round, 133rd overall pick

Career history
- Cleveland Rams (1939)

Career NFL statistics
- Games played: 10
- Games started: 4
- Stats at Pro Football Reference

Benjamin W. Friend (January 30, 1912 – November 18, 1953) was an American professional football player who played as a tackle in the National Football League (NFL) for one season with the Cleveland Rams in 1939. He was drafted in the 15th round of the 1939 NFL Draft. He played in ten games for the team and started in four of them. He attended Louisiana State University, where he played college football for the LSU Tigers football team. In 1937 he was selected by the Associated Press to its All-Southeastern Conference third-team. In 1938, he served as team captain.
