= George Faust =

American football player (1917–1993)

No. 53
- Position: Blocking back

Personal information
- Born: September 28, 1917; Parkston, South Dakota, U.S.
- Died: May 28, 1993 (aged 75); Edina, Minnesota, U.S.
- Listed height: 6 ft 1 in (1.85 m)
- Listed weight: 205 lb (93 kg)

Career information
- High school: North (Minneapolis, Minnesota)
- College: Minnesota (1935–1938)
- NFL draft: 1939: 6th round, 42nd overall pick

Career history
- Chicago Cardinals (1939)

Awards and highlights
- National champion (1936)

Career NFL statistics
- Rushing yards: 71
- Rushing average: 3.2
- Receptions: 4
- Receiving yards: 85
- Punts: 25
- Punting yards: 1,101
- Longest punt: 63
- Stats at Pro Football Reference

George John Faust (September 28, 1917 – May 28, 1993) was an American professional football player who played one season with the Chicago Cardinals of the National Football League (NFL). He was selected by the Cardinals in the sixth round of the 1939 NFL draft after playing college football at the University of Minnesota.

== Early life ==
George John Faust was born on September 28, 1917, in Parkston, South Dakota. He attended North Community High School in Minneapolis, Minnesota.

== College career ==
Faust played college football for the Minnesota Golden Gophers of the University of Minnesota from 1935 to 1938. He was on the freshman team in 1935 and a three-year letterman from 1936 to 1938. He rushed 17 times for 32 yards in 1936 as the Golden Gophers won the national championship. Faust started at quarterback from 1937 to 1938.

== Professional career ==
Faust was selected by the Chicago Cardinals in the sixth round, with the 42nd overall pick, of the 1939 NFL draft. He played in nine games, starting six, for the Cardinals in 1939, recording 22 carries for 71 yards, four catches for 85 yards, five incomplete passes for one interception, one missed field goal, one of one extra points, and 25 punts for 1,101 yards. He became a free agent after the season.

== Personal life ==
Faust served in the United States Navy during World War II and played football for the Jacksonville Naval Air Station Fliers. He flew 17 missions as a fighter pilot during the war. He later worked in food and beverage marketing. Faust died on May 28, 1993, on Edina, Minnesota.
