= Davey O'Brien =

American football player (1917–1977)

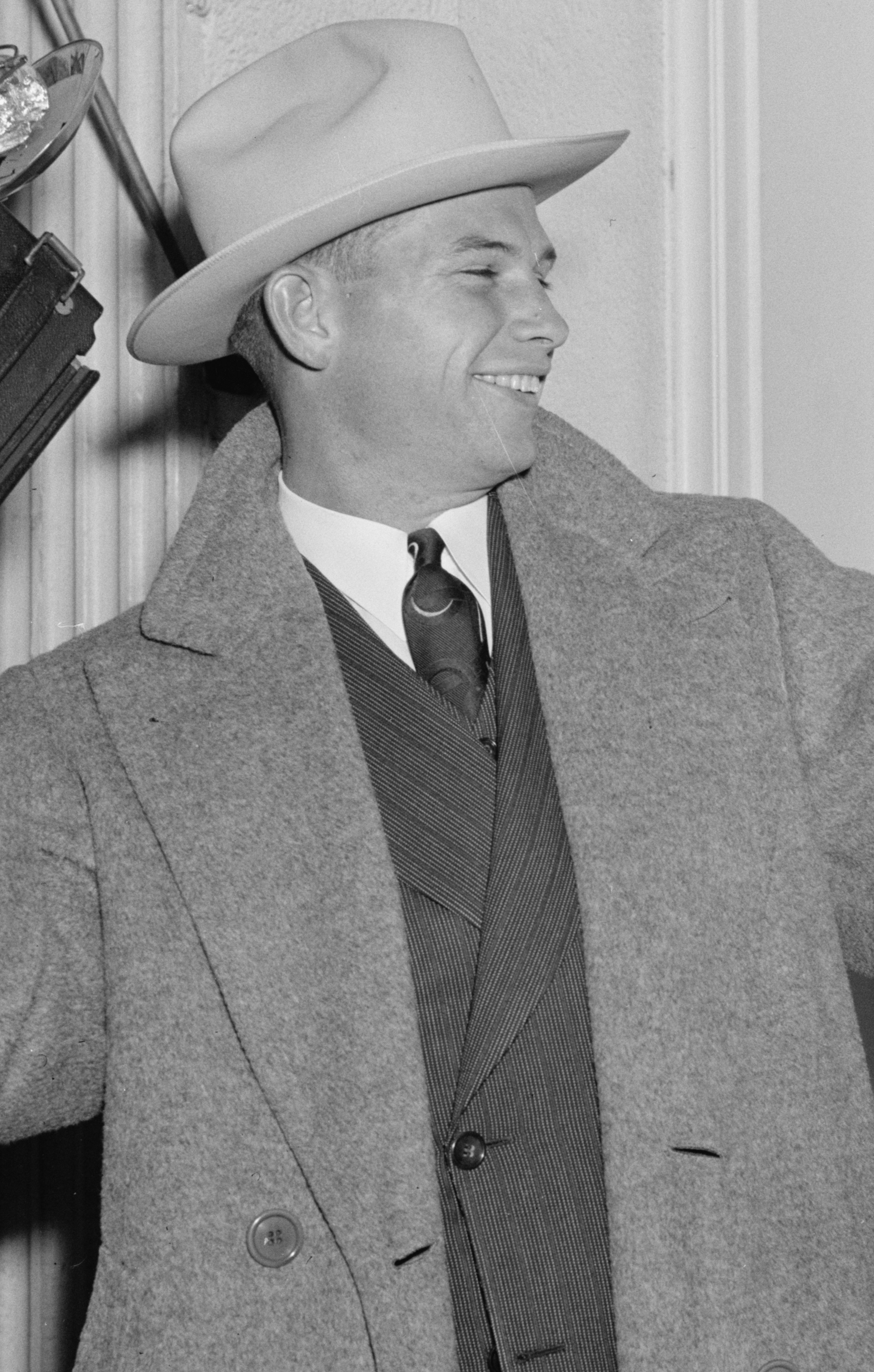
- O'Brien c. 1938

No. 8
- Positions: Quarterback, safety

Personal information
- Born: June 22, 1917; Dallas, Texas, U.S.
- Died: November 18, 1977 (aged 60); Fort Worth, Texas, U.S.
- Listed height: 5 ft 7 in (1.70 m)
- Listed weight: 151 lb (68 kg)

Career information
- High school: Woodrow Wilson (Dallas)
- College: TCU (1936–1938)
- NFL draft: 1939: 1st round, 4th overall pick

Career history
- Philadelphia Eagles (1939–1940)

Awards and highlights
- First-team All-Pro (1939); NFL All-Star (1939); NFL passing yards leader (1939); National champion (1938); Heisman Trophy (1938); Unanimous All-American (1938); 2× First-team All-SWC (1937, 1938); TCU Horned Frogs No. 8 retired

Career NFL statistics
- Passing attempts: 478
- Passing completions: 223
- Completion percentage: 46.7%
- TD–INT: 11–34
- Passing yards: 2,614
- Passer rating: 41.8
- Stats at Pro Football Reference
- College Football Hall of Fame

Robert David O'Brien (June 22, 1917 – November 18, 1977) was an American professional football player who was a quarterback in the National Football League (NFL) with the Philadelphia Eagles for two seasons. He played college football for the TCU Horned Frogs, where he won the Heisman Trophy and the Maxwell Award in 1938, the first quarterback to win either. He was the fourth overall pick of the 1939 NFL draft. O'Brien was inducted into the College Football Hall of Fame in 1955.

Since 1981, the Davey O'Brien Award is given annually to the best quarterback in college football.

== Early life ==
Born in Dallas, Texas, O'Brien played high school football at its Woodrow Wilson High School. He was an All-State selection and led the high school to the Texas state playoffs in 1932.

== College career ==
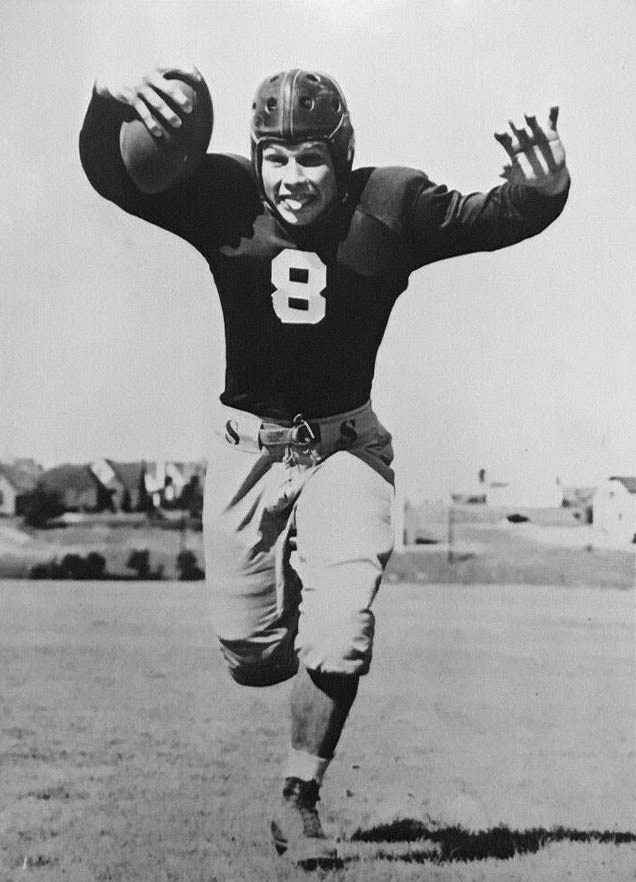
O'Brien with TCU in 1938

O'Brien played college football at nearby TCU in Fort Worth in 1935 as a backup for Sammy Baugh. He became the starter in 1937, and was named to the first-team All-Southwest Conference.

In 1938, O'Brien threw for 1,457 yards – a Southwest Conference passing record that stood for ten years. He had only four interceptions in 194 attempts, and his NCAA record for most rushing and passing plays in a single season still stands today. That season, he led the Horned Frogs to an undefeated season. They outscored their opponents by a 269–60 margin and held nine of their ten regular-season opponents to seven points or fewer, including three shutouts. TCU finished the season with a 15–7 victory over Carnegie Tech in the Sugar Bowl and a national championship. O’Brien was named to 13 All-America teams and became the first player to win the Heisman and Maxwell awards in the same year. He was the first Heisman winner from TCU and the Southwest Conference. Off the field, he was also an honorary member Sigma Phi Epsilon fraternity, Texas Gamma chapter. He majored in geology and expressed little interest in pro football in January 1939.

=== College statistics ===
Season	Team	Cmp	Att	Pct	Yds	TD
1937	TCU	96	237	40.5	947	5
1938	TCU	93	166	56.0	1,457	19

== Professional career ==
O'Brien was selected in the first round with the fourth overall pick of the 1939 NFL draft, held in December 1938. He was selected by the Philadelphia Eagles, and owner Bert Bell gave him a $12,000 bonus and a two-year contract, and he signed with the team in March. O'Brien became the first Heisman trophy winner to play in the NFL.

O'Brien gets hit by Tony Furst of the Lions after delivering a pass, 1940.

In his rookie season in the NFL in 1939, O'Brien led the league in passing with 1,324 yards in 11 games, breaking his old TCU teammate Sammy Baugh's single season passing yardage record, but the Eagles finished at 1–9–1. After an appendectomy in late June, he again led the league in several passing categories in 1940, including attempts and completions.

Despite O'Brien's efforts, Philadelphia lost their first nine games and finished at 1–10, last in the ten-team league. The Eagles offered O'Brien a $2,000 raise for 1941, but he retired after the 1940 season to take a government job.

In his professional career, O'Brien completed 223 of 478 passes for 2,614 yards and 11 touchdowns. He was also a defensive back and punter, intercepted four passes for 92 yards and punted nine times for an average of 40.7 yards per kick.

== Life after football ==
After two seasons with the Eagles, O'Brien retired from football to become an agent in the Federal Bureau of Investigation (FBI), where he worked for ten years. After completing his training, he was assigned to the bureau's field office in Springfield, Missouri. He was a firearms instructor at Quantico, Virginia, and spent the last five years of his FBI career in Dallas. He resigned from the bureau in 1950 and went to work for H. L. Hunt in land development. O'Brien later entered the oil business, working for Dresser Atlas Industries of Dallas and was an adviser to Lamar Hunt during the founding of the American Football League.

O'Brien was also president of the TCU Alumni Association, a YMCA board member, a chair of the Tarrant County Democratic Party, a supporter of Golden Gloves youth boxing programs, and a deacon of University Christian Church. He was elected to the College Football Hall of Fame in 1955 and the Texas Sports Hall of Fame in 1956. From 1960 to 1964, he was the color commentator on Dallas Cowboys telecasts.

In 1971, O'Brien was diagnosed with cancer and underwent surgery to remove a kidney and part of his right lung, but eventually died from the disease on November 18, 1977.

When Tim Brown won the Heisman Trophy in 1987, it made Woodrow Wilson High School in Dallas the distinction of being the first to produce two Heisman winners.

In 1989, O'Brien (posthumously) and Brown were inducted together into Woodrow Wilson High School's newly created Hall of Fame in celebration of the school's 60th anniversary.

== See also ==
- List of NCAA major college football yearly passing leaders
- List of NCAA major college football yearly total offense leaders
