= Zed Coston =

American football player (1915–2003)

No. 23
- Position: Center

Personal information
- Born: July 12, 1915; Dallas, Texas, U.S.
- Died: March 23, 2003 (aged 87)
- Listed height: 6 ft 2 in (1.88 m)
- Listed weight: 222 lb (101 kg)

Career information
- High school: Dallas
- College: Texas A&M
- NFL draft: 1939: 5th round, 34th overall pick

Career history
- Philadelphia Eagles (1939)

Career NFL statistics
- Games played: 1
- Stats at Pro Football Reference

Fred Monroe "Zed" Coston (July 12, 1915 – March 23, 2003) was an American professional football center who played one season in the National Football League (NFL).

Coston attended Crozier Tech High School and was an all-state center. D Magazine later selected him to their all-time All-Dallas high school football team. After playing college football for the Texas A&M Aggies for three years, he was drafted into the NFL by the Philadelphia Eagles in 1939. He played one game. He died in 2003.
