= 1939 Green Bay Packers season =

NFL team season

- Head coach: Curly Lambeau
- Home stadium: City Stadium; Wisconsin State Fair Park

Results
- Record: 9–2
- Division place: 1st NFL Western
- Playoffs: Won NFL Championship (vs. Giants) 27–0

The 1939 Green Bay Packers season was their 21st season overall and their 19th season in the National Football League. The Packers finished with a 9–2 record under founder and head coach Curly Lambeau, earning a first-place finish in the Western Conference. Green Bay shut out the New York Giants 27–0 in the NFL Championship Game, earning the franchise's fifth NFL Championship and the first NFL title game shutout ever.

== Schedule ==
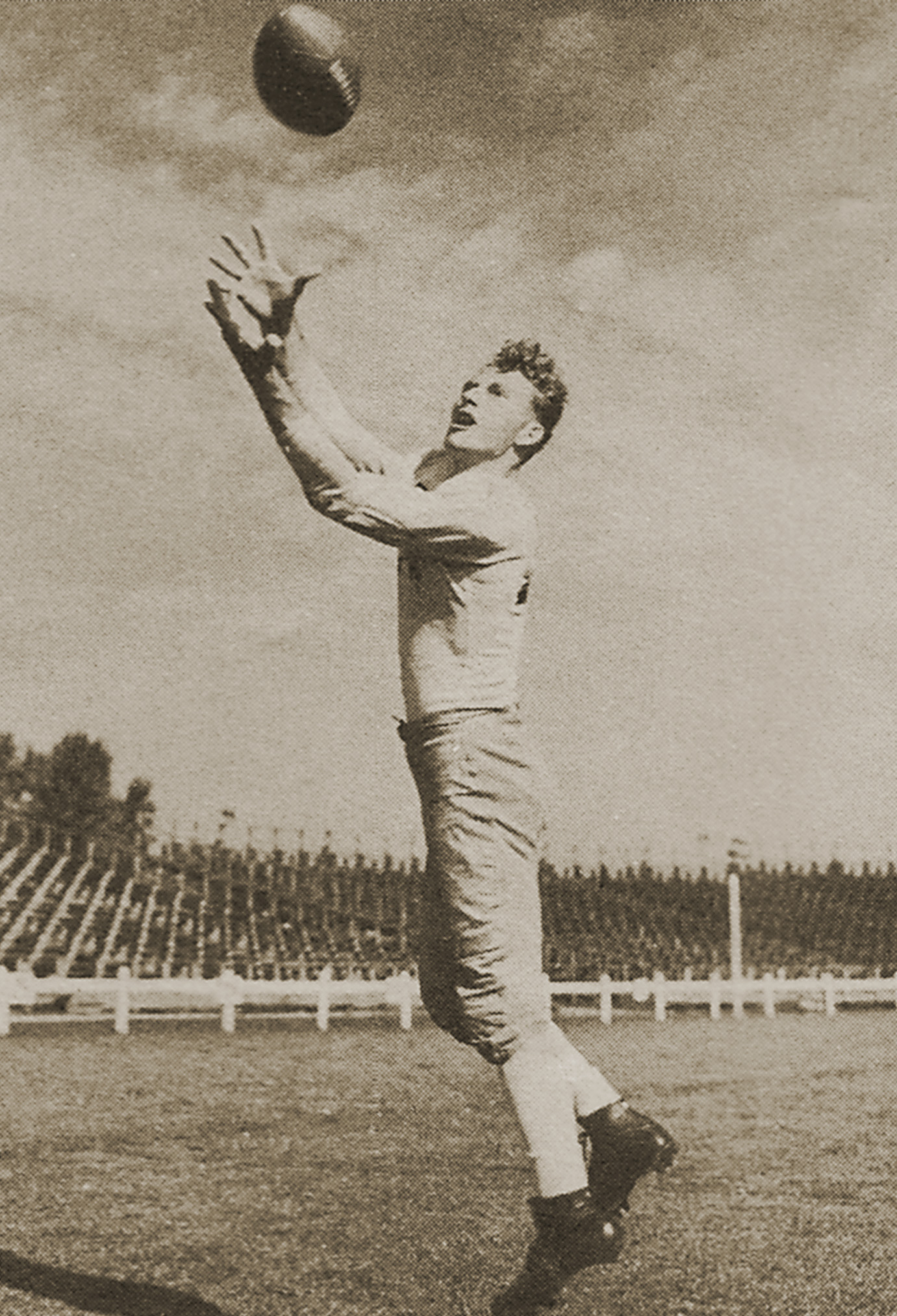
Leading scorer for the 1939 Packers was end Don Hutson

Week	Date	Opponent	Result	Record
1	September 17	Chicago Cardinals	W 14–10	1–0
2	September 24	Chicago Bears	W 21–16	2–0
3	October 1	Cleveland Rams	L 24–27	2–1
4	October 8	Chicago Cardinals	W 27–20	3–1
5	October 22	Detroit Lions	W 26–7	4–1
6	October 29	Washington Redskins	W 24–14	5–1
7	November 5	at Chicago Bears	L 27–30	5–2
8	November 12	at Philadelphia Eagles	W 23–16	6–2
9	November 19	at Brooklyn Dodgers	W 28–0	7–2
10	November 26	at Cleveland Rams	W 7–6	8–2
11	December 3	at Detroit Lions	W 12–7	9–2

== Standings ==
NFL Western Division
	W	L	T	PCT	DIV	PF	PA	STK
Green Bay Packers	9	2	0	.818	6–2	233	153	W4
Chicago Bears	8	3	0	.727	6–2	298	157	W4
Detroit Lions	6	5	0	.545	4–4	145	150	L4
Cleveland Rams	5	5	1	.500	4–4	195	164	W1
Chicago Cardinals	1	10	0	.091	0–8	84	254	L8

Note: Tie games were not officially counted in the standings until 1972.

== Post-season ==
Week	Date	Opponent	Result	Record	Venue
Championship	December 10	New York Giants	W 27–0	1–0	Wisconsin State Fair Park
All-Star Game	January 14, 1940	NFL All-Stars	W 16–7	2–0	Gilmore Stadium

== Roster ==
1939 Green Bay Packers final roster
Backs: 35 Frank Balazs FB/LB; 5 Hank Bruder RB/CB/S; 52 Larry Buhler RB/CB; 54 Larry Craig RB/CB/S; 38 Arnie Herber RB/CB/S/P; 30 Clarke Hinkle FB/LB/K/P; 17 Cecil Isbell RB/CB/K; 7 Eddie Jankowski FB/LB; 59 Jimmy Lawrence RB/CB; 24 Joe Laws RB/CB; 50 Tuffy Thompson RB/CB; 42 Andy Uram RB/CB; 33 Dick Weisgerber RB/S	Linemen/Linebackers: 29 Charley Brock C/LB; 34 Tiny Engebretsen G/DG/K; 43 Buckets Goldenberg G/DG; 56 Tom Greenfield C/LB; 41 Paul Kell T/DT; 40 Bill Lee T/DT; 46 Russ Letlow G/DG; 44 Baby Ray T/DT; 60 Charlie Schultz T/DT; 45 Ernie Smith T/DT/K; 53 Bud Svendsen C/LB; 21 Pete Tinsley G/DG; 63 Gust Zarnas G/DG	Ends/Receivers: 22 Milt Gantenbein; 14 Don Hutson K; 48 Harry Jacunski; 19 Carl Mulleneaux; Rookies in italics
