= Jim German =

American football player (1917–1945)

Jimmy German
No. 34, 60
- Positions: Quarterback, Running back

Personal information
- Born: November 6, 1917; Louisville, Kentucky, U.S.
- Died: August 8, 1945 (aged 27)
- Listed height: 6 ft 0 in (1.83 m)
- Listed weight: 180 lb (82 kg)

Career information
- High school: duPont Manual (Louisville)
- College: Centre (1935-1938)
- NFL draft: 1939: 11th round, 98th overall pick

Career history
- Washington Redskins (1939); Chicago Cardinals (1940)

Career NFL statistics
- Rushing yards: 58
- Passing yards: 97
- Touchdowns: 2
- Stats at Pro Football Reference

James H. German (November 6, 1917 – August 8, 1945) was an American professional football player who was a quarterback for two seasons in the National Football League (NFL). He played college football for the Centre Colonels and was selected in the eleventh round of the 1939 NFL draft by the Washington Redskins.
