= Wally Garard =

American football player (1916–2004)

- Wally Garard, 1938

Saint Mary's Gaels
- Position: Tackle

Personal information
- Born: August 3, 1916; Los Angeles, California
- Died: February 25, 2004 (aged 87)
- Listed height: 6 ft 2 in (1.88 m)
- Listed weight: 225 lb (102 kg)

Career information
- High school: John C. Fremont (CA)
- College: Saint Mary's (1934–1938)

Wallace Arthur Garard Jr. (August 3, 1916 – February 25, 2004) was an American football tackle who played for the Saint Mary's Gaels. He was later selected in the fourth round (28th overall) of the 1939 NFL draft, but did not play professionally.

Garard was born on August 3, 1916, in Los Angeles, California. He attended John C. Fremont High School in South Los Angeles, graduating in 1934 before joining Saint Mary's College of California. Though he did not play in 1934, Garard earned a position on the varsity team in the following year.

In October 1936, he was Saint Mary's "star center". He left the team prior to a game against Marquette, leaving a note stating that he was homesick and intended to "bum" his way home. Garard returned to the team in 1938, but he missed the final games of the year as a result of an illness.

In December 1938, Garard was selected by the Cleveland Rams with the 28th overall pick of the 1939 NFL draft. He opted not to play professionally. He later owned a business in Concord, California. He died on February 25, 2004, at the age of 87.
