= Fabian Hoffman =

American football player (1917–1980)

- Hoffman, c. 1937

Pittsburgh Panthers
- Position: End

Personal information
- Born: January 14, 1917; Pittsburgh, Pennsylvania, U.S.
- Died: April 19, 1980 (aged 63); Florida, U.S.
- Listed height: 6 ft 0 in (1.83 m)
- Listed weight: 181 lb (82 kg)

Career information
- High school: Central Catholic (Pittsburgh)
- College: Pittsburgh (1935–1938)

Awards and highlights
- National champion (1937)

Fabian Henry Hoffman (January 14, 1917 – April 19, 1980) was an American football end who played for the Pittsburgh Panthers. He was selected in the 13th round (112th overall) of the 1939 NFL draft by the Pittsburgh Steelers, but opted not to play professionally.

Hoffman was born on January 14, 1917, in Pittsburgh, Pennsylvania. He attended Central Catholic High School there, graduating in 1935, before going to University of Pittsburgh. Hoffman played end on their freshman football team that year, before joining the varsity squad one year later. Hoffman was a member of their 1937 roster, which won the national championship. He reported late to the team in 1938 and lost his starting job as a result. Following the season, he was named by Paul Mickelson to the "All-America team of Unsung Heroes". He was selected in the 13th round (112th overall) of the 1939 NFL draft by the Pittsburgh Steelers, but opted not to pursue a professional career and instead got a coaching position with Kittanning High School. He died in 1980, at the age of 63.
