= Chuck Hanneman =

American football player (1914–1999)

- Hanneman in 1936

No. 12
- Positions: End, placekicker

Personal information
- Born: September 26, 1914; Flint, Michigan
- Died: March 31, 1999 (aged 84); Cadillac, Michigan
- Listed height: 6 ft 0 in (1.83 m)
- Listed weight: 220 lb (100 kg)

Career information
- High school: Grosse Pointe (MI)
- College: Michigan State Normal College

Career history
- Detroit Lions (1937–1941); Cleveland Rams (1941)

Awards and highlights
- Detroit Lions leading receiver (1939)

Career statistics
- Games played: 46
- Starts: 22
- Receiving Yards: 618 (17.7 ave.)
- Touchdowns: 4
- Stats at Pro Football Reference

Charles Bennett Hanneman (September 26, 1914 – March 31, 1999) was an American football player. He played college football for Michigan State Normal College (now Eastern Michigan University) and professional football as a two-way end and placekicker for the Detroit Lions and Cleveland Rams from 1937 to 1941.

== Early life ==
Hanneman was born in 1914 at Flint, Michigan. He attended Grosse Pointe High School, earning 12 varsity letters, four in football, four in basketball, three in baseball, and one in track.

Hanneman attended Michigan State Normal College (now known as Eastern Michigan University), where he earned three letters each in football and basketball between 1932 and 1935.

== Professional football ==
Hanneman began playing professional football for the Springfield Bicos in 1936. He then played at the end position on both offense and defense for the Detroit Lions from 1937 to 1941. He was the Lions' leading receiver in 1939 with 257 receiving yards. In a victory over the Bears in October 1939, he scored 11 points on a touchdown reception, a field goal, and two extra points, and also played "a perfect defensive game." He was released by the Lions at the end of October 1941. He was then signed by the Cleveland Rams. He appeared in only one game with the Rams. During five years in the NFL, he appeared in 46 games and scored 70 points on five touchdowns, 19 extra points, and seven field goals.

== Later life ==
Hanneman was elected to the Eastern Michigan Athletic Hall of Fame in 1977. He died in 1999 at a nursing home in Cadillac, Michigan, at age 84.
