= Marty Slovak =

American football player (1916–1950)

Profile
- Positions: Tailback, defensive back

Personal information
- Born: December 25, 1916; Newport, Michigan, U.S.
- Died: March 22, 1950 (aged 33); Toledo, Ohio, U.S.
- Listed height: 5 ft 9 in (1.75 m)
- Listed weight: 179 lb (81 kg)

Career information
- College: Toledo

Career history
- Cleveland Rams (1939–1941)

Career statistics
- Games: 27
- Games started: 6
- Rushing yards: 396
- Stats at Pro Football Reference

Martin Slovak (December 25, 1916 – March 22, 1950) was an American football player.

Slovak attended Salem-Oak Harbor High School in Oak Harbor, Ohio, where he was a star athlete. He then played college football for the University of Toledo from 1934 to 1936. He played professional football in 1937 for the Nashville Rebels. He then played in the National Football League (NFL) as a tailback and defensive back for the Cleveland Rams from 1939 to 1941. He appeared in 27 NFL games, six as a starter, and gained 396 rushing yards. Former Rams coach Dutch Clark called Slovak one of the best "team players" he ever coached.

Slovak entered the military service in 1941. He died of cancer in 1950 at age 34.
