= Swede Johnston =

American football player (1910–2002)

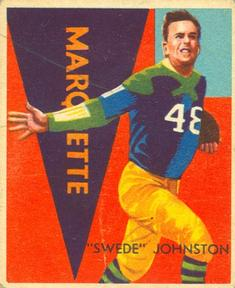

No. 37, 25, 15, 6
- Position: Back

Personal information
- Born: March 7, 1910; Appleton, Wisconsin, U.S.
- Died: September 19, 2002 (aged 92); St. Louis, Missouri, U.S.
- Listed height: 5 ft 8 in (1.73 m)
- Listed weight: 196 lb (89 kg)

Career information
- High school: Appleton
- College: Marquette, Miami, Elmhurst

Career history
- Green Bay Packers (1931); Chicago Cardinals (1933); Cincinnati Reds (1934); St. Louis Gunners (1934); Green Bay Packers (1934–1938); Pittsburgh Pirates (1939); Pittsburgh Steelers (1940)

Awards and highlights
- 2× NFL champion (1931, 1936); Green Bay Packers Hall of Fame
- Stats at Pro Football Reference

Chester Arthur "Swede" Johnston (March 7, 1910 – September 19, 2002) was an American football back primarily for the Green Bay Packers of the National Football League (NFL). Johnston also played for the Cincinnati Reds, St. Louis Gunners, Cleveland Rams, and Pittsburgh Steelers.

Johnston was born in Appleton, Wisconsin to Swedish immigrant parents. In 1981, he was inducted into the Green Bay Packers Hall of Fame. He died in St. Louis, Missouri and is buried in Dodgeville, Wisconsin.
