= Irv Hall (American football) =

American football player (1913–1964)

No. 32
- Position: Fullback

Personal information
- Born: November 23, 1913; Raynham, Massachusetts, U.S.
- Died: January 24, 1964 (aged 50); Orlando, Florida, U.S.
- Listed height: 6 ft 0 in (1.83 m)
- Listed weight: 210 lb (95 kg)

Career information
- College: Brown
- NFL draft: 1939: 16th round, 144th overall pick

Career history
- Philadelphia Eagles (1942)

Career NFL statistics
- Rushing yards: 14
- Rushing average: 1.8
- Receptions: 2
- Receiving yards: 18
- Stats at Pro Football Reference

Irving Alger Hall, Jr. (November 23, 1913 – January 24, 1964) was an American professional football player who was a fullback for the Philadelphia Eagles of the National Football League (NFL) for one season in 1942. He played college football for the Brown Bears and was selected by the Eagles in the 17th round of the 1939 NFL draft. He served in World War II for the United States Navy.
