= 1939 NFL Championship Game =

Coordinates: 43.020°N 88.012°W

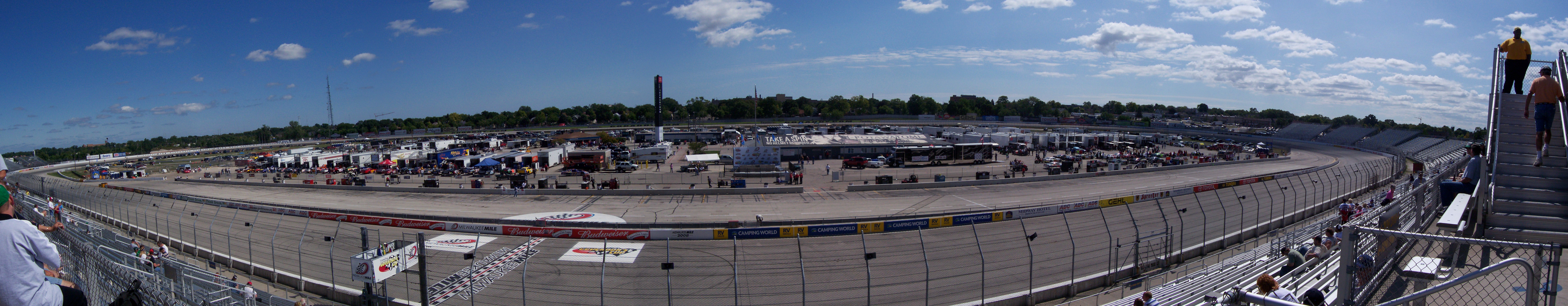
- The Milwaukee Mile in the Wisconsin State Fair Park in West Allis, Wisconsin, the site of the 1939 NFL Championship Game.
New York Giants (Eastern) (9–1–1)	Green Bay Packers (Western) (9–2)
0	27
Head coach: Steve Owen	Head coach: Curly Lambeau
	1	2	3	4	Total
NYG	0	0	0	0	0
GB	7	0	10	10	27
- Date: December 10, 1939
- Stadium: Milwaukee Mile (State Fair Park); West Allis, Wisconsin
- Favorite: Green Bay by 10 points Green Bay 7-to-5
- Referee: Bill Halloran
- Attendance: 32,379

Location in the United States

The 1939 NFL Championship Game was the seventh league championship game of the National Football League (NFL), held on December 10 inside the Milwaukee Mile, located at the Wisconsin State Fair Park in West Allis, a suburb west of Milwaukee.

The New York Giants (9–1–1), the defending champions, played the Western Division champion Green Bay Packers (9–2). The teams had met in the previous year's title game in New York City, which the Giants won by six points, but did not play each other in the 1939 regular season. For the title game in Wisconsin, the Packers opened as 8-to-5 gambling favorites to win, with odds said to have tightened to 7-to-5 as gametime approached.

The host Packers scored a touchdown in the first quarter and led 7–0 at halftime. They dominated in the second half to win 27–0 and secure their fifth title—two more than any other franchise. At the time, it was the highest attended sporting event in the Milwaukee area's history.

== Location ==
The game (hosted by the Packers) was held in Milwaukee, Wisconsin at the "Dairy Bowl" stadium, located in the infield of the Milwaukee Mile racetrack). The game took place in Milwaukee rather than the team's home city of Green Bay, Wisconsin due to team owner Curly Lambeau's belief that a game in Milwaukee (a larger city more accessible by rail) would generate greater attendance than one in Green Bay. Lambeau's decision paid off, with a sold-out game. The newly-built "Dairy Bowl" football stadium was dedicated at halftime with the breaking of a bottle of milk. On hand were Wisconsin Governor Julius P. Heil and Milwaukee Mayor Daniel Hoan.

The day before the game, the 1940 NFL draft was held at Milwaukee's Schroeder Hotel.

== Scoring summary ==
Green Bay Packers 27, New York Giants 0

Quarter	1	2	3	4	Total
Giants	0	0	0	0	0
Packers	7	0	10	10	27

- Date: December 10, 1939
- Game time: 1:30 p.m. CST
- Pro-Football-Reference.com

Game information
- First quarter
  - GB – Milt Gantenbein 7-yard pass from Arnie Herber (Paul Engebretsen kick). Packers 7–0
- Second quarter
  - no scoring
- Third quarter
  - GB – Engebretsen 29-yard field goal. Packers 10–0
  - GB – Joe Laws 31-yard yard pass from Cecil Isbell (Engebretsen kick). Packers 17–0
- Fourth quarter
  - GB – Ernie Smith 42-yard field goal. Packers 20–0
  - GB – Eddie Jankowski 1-yard run (Smith kick). Packers 27–0

== Statistics ==
Statistics	New York	Green Bay
First downs	7	10
Yards gained rushing (net)	56	131
Forward passes attempted	26	10
Forward passes completed	9	7
Yards by forward passing	98	99
Yards lost, attempted forward passes	12	8
Yards gained, run back of intercepted passes	27	39
Punting average (from scrimmage)	32	38
Total yards all kicks returned	98	35
Opponents fumbles recovered	0	0
Yards lost by penalties	20	50

== Officials ==
- Referee: Bill Halloran
- Umpire: Ed Cochrane
- Head linesman: Tom Thorp
- Field judge: Dan Tehan

The NFL had only four game officials in 1939; the back judge was added in 1947, the line judge in 1965, and the side judge in 1978.

== Attendance and receipts ==
The Packers moved the game from Green Bay to the larger metropolitan area of Milwaukee in hopes of increasing attendance. Ultimately, 32,379 paid to watch. At the time, this was the highest attended sporting event in the Milwaukee area. The gross gate receipts of $83,510.35 set a new record.

The title game tickets went on sale at noon on Monday, six days before the game, in both Green Bay and Milwaukee and were nearly sold out in the first 24 hours. Face value prices ranged from $1.10 to $4.40 per seat, the equivalent of $22 to $87 in 2021.

=== Team shares ===
The gate was distributed as follows:

- The Packers took $23,231.06, with their 33 players each receiving $703.97.
- The Giants took $15,487.37, with their 34 players each receiving $455.57.

=== Team rosters ===
Source:

== See also ==
- Giants–Packers rivalry
