= Pug Manders =

American football player (1913–1985)

- Manders in 1941

No. 9, 25, 76, 74
- Position: Fullback

Personal information
- Born: May 5, 1913; Milbank, South Dakota, U.S.
- Died: January 13, 1985 (aged 71); Des Moines, Iowa, U.S.
- Listed height: 6 ft 0 in (1.83 m)
- Listed weight: 200 lb (91 kg)

Career information
- High school: Milbank
- College: Drake (1934-1938)
- NFL draft: 1939: 2nd round, 11th overall pick

Career history
- Brooklyn Dodgers/Tigers (1939–1944); Boston Yanks (1945); New York Yankees (1946); Buffalo Bills (1947)

Awards and highlights
- First-team All-Pro (1941); 3× All-Star Game 1939-1941); NFL rushing yards leader (1941)

Career NFL statistics
- Rushing yards: 2,291
- Rushing average: 3.7
- Receptions: 25
- Receiving yards: 326
- Total touchdowns: 36
- Stats at Pro Football Reference

Clarence Edward "Pug" Manders (May 5, 1913 – January 13, 1985) was an American professional football fullback who played professionally in the National Football League (NFL) for the Brooklyn Dodgers/Tigers from 1939 through 1944. He was selected in the second round of the 1939 NFL draft with the 11th overall pick. Manders led the NFL in rushing in 1941, with 486 yards.

He was the younger brother of Chicago Bears kicker "Automatic Jack" Manders.

Manders on the cover of an October 1939 Dodgers game program

== NFL career statistics ==
Legend
	Led the league
**Bold**	Career high

Year	Team	Games		Rushing				Receiving			
Year	Team	GP	GS	Att	Yds	Avg	TD	Rec	Yds	Avg	TD
1939	BKN	11	9	114	482	4.2	2	3	22	7.3	0
1940	BKN	11	11	80	311	3.9	5	1	38	**38.0**	**1**
1941	BKN	11	11	111	**486**	**4.4**	5	**6**	67	11.2	0
1942	BKN	11	11	93	316	3.4	**6**	4	53	13.3	0
1943	BKN	10	9	89	266	3.0	3	5	68	13.6	**1**
1944	BKN	10	9	**127**	430	3.4	5	**6**	**78**	13.0	0
1945	BOS	10	10	76	238	3.1	**6**	0	0	0.0	0
		74	70	690	2,529	3.7	32	25	326	13.0	2
