= Wisconsin State Fair Park =

Fairgrounds and exhibition center in West Allis, Wisconsin

Coordinates: 43°1′19″N 88°0′46″W

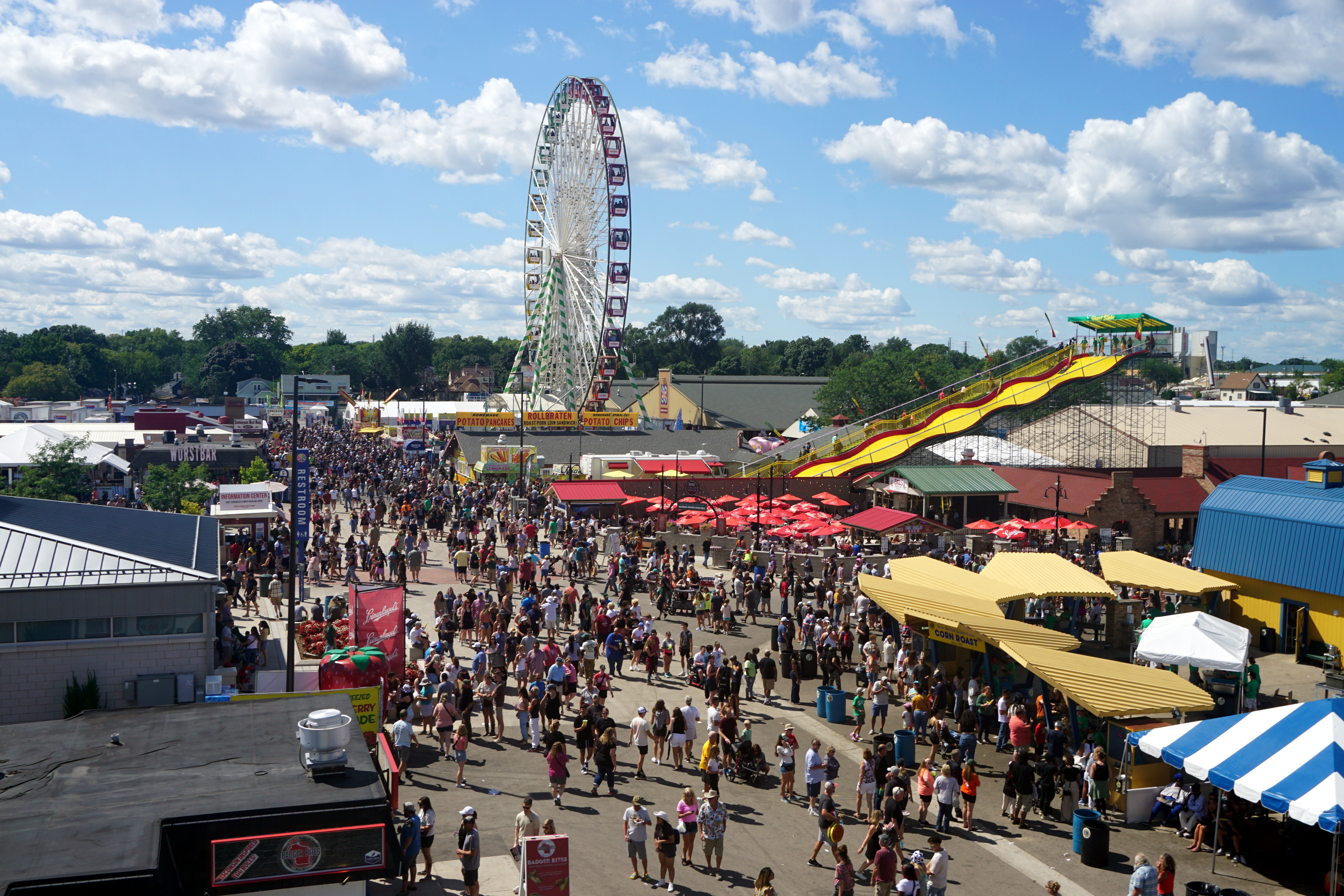
Second Street at the Wisconsin State Fair Park as viewed from the SkyGlider

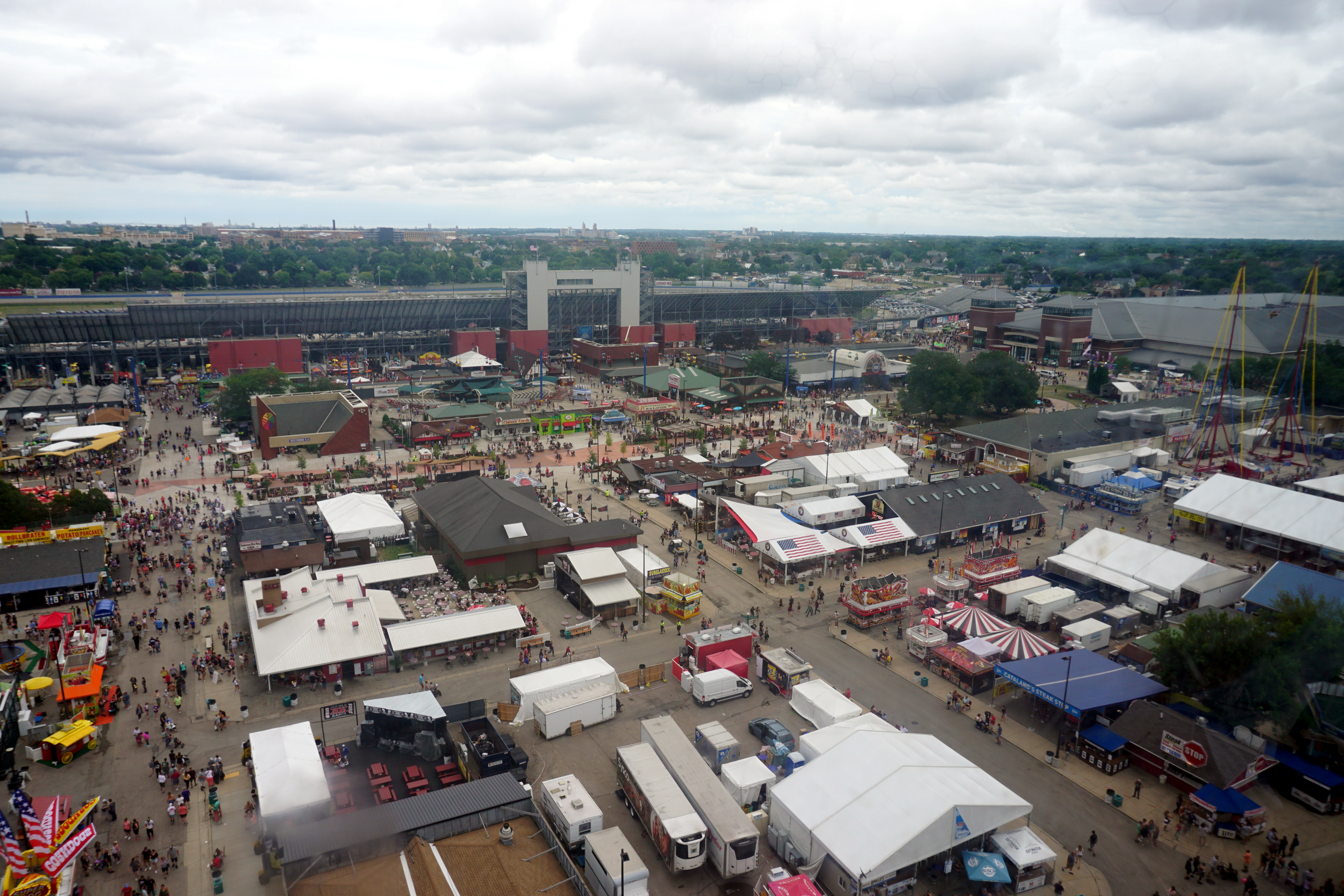
Wisconsin State Fair Park as viewed from the WonderFair Wheel

The Wisconsin State Fair Park is a fairgrounds and exhibition center in West Allis, Wisconsin, a suburb west of Milwaukee. It has been the location of the Wisconsin State Fair since 1892. The fairgrounds are open year-round, hosting various expositions (many of them agricultural).

It also contains venues such as the Milwaukee Mile, the oldest continuously operating motor speedway in the world, and the Pettit National Ice Center, a U.S. Olympic training facility which is independently owned. The Park is policed by the Wisconsin State Fair Park Police Department.

== History ==
In 1891, the Wisconsin Agricultural Society purchased almost 100 acres (40 ha) of farmland from George Stevens, in what was then North Greenfield (Honey Creek settlement), in order to secure a permanent site for the Wisconsin State Fair. The fairgrounds later became a staging ground for Camp Harvey during the Spanish–American War and World Wars I and II. Two Wisconsin historical markers, which are positioned at the entrance of the Wisconsin Exposition Center, document this history for visitors.

The NFL's Green Bay Packers played several regular season home games per year at the park from 1934 through 1951, including the 1939 NFL Championship Game. After a year at Marquette Stadium in 1952, the Packers moved their Milwaukee-area games to County Stadium when it opened in 1953. Packer games in Milwaukee were ended after the 1994 season.

The grounds of the State Fair, at the Wisconsin Department of Natural Resources park site, contain one of only two Indian effigy mounds remaining in Milwaukee County. (The other is located at Lake Park in Milwaukee.) Four pre-historic mounds originally populated the location, which were built by the Woodlands People from 100 to 1000 AD. They contained artifacts dating to 8000 BC, some of which can be found at the West Allis Historical Museum.

On July 25–27, 1969 the Midwest Rock Festival was held at the State Fair Park.

== State Fair Park Police ==
The Wisconsin State Fair Park Police Department is a law enforcement agency that protects the fair grounds and, if necessary, the area surrounding it. Officers enjoy full police powers, and has close connections to the West Allis Police Department.

The department was founded in 1907 as a police entity. It continued to operate as such until 1999, when it was dissolved. Between 2000 and 2006, the Wisconsin Capitol Police were responsible for law enforcement operations during the Wisconsin State Fair. In 2007, the Wisconsin State Fair Park Police Department was recreated to provide year-round protection for the park grounds.

== Park facilities ==
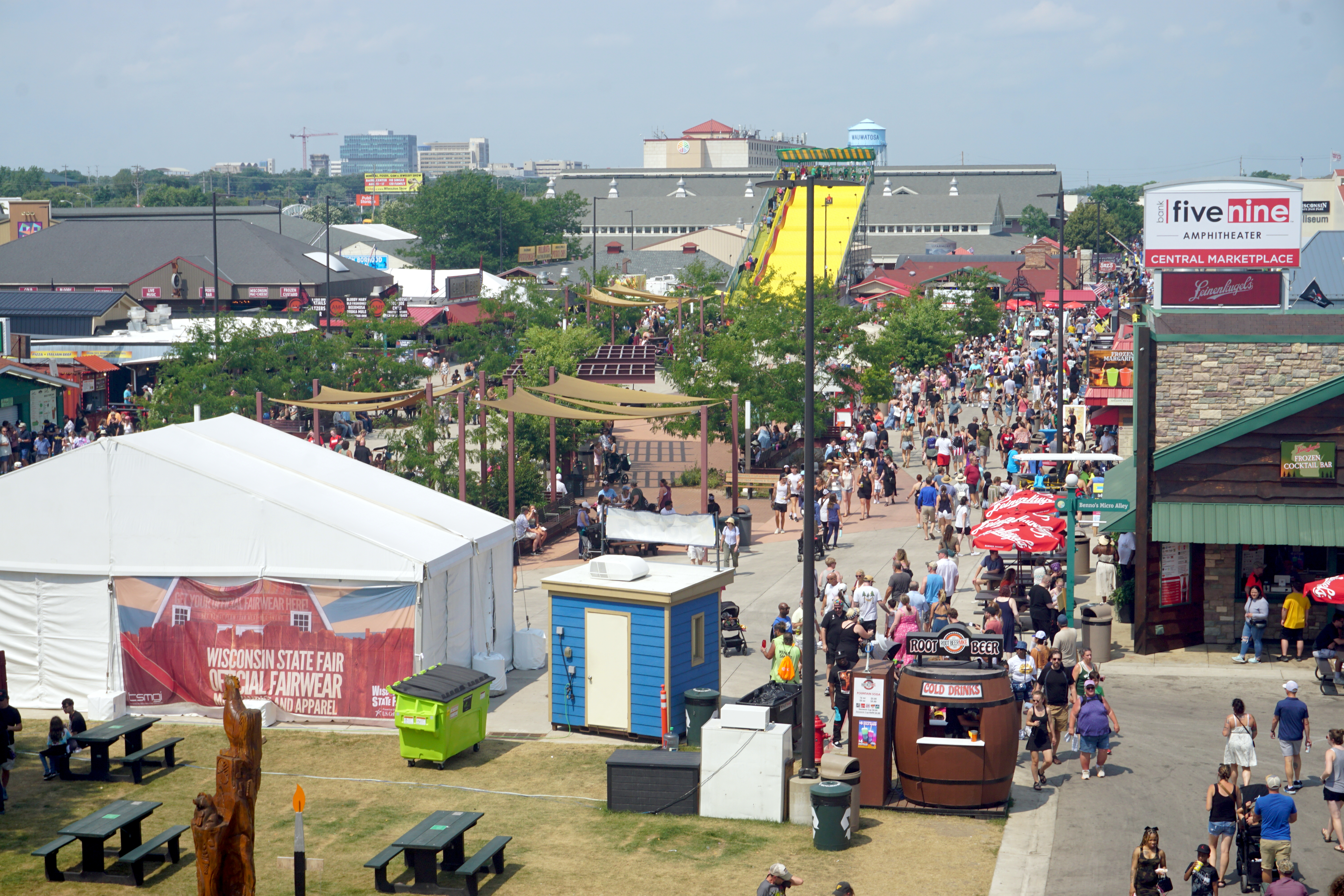
The Central Mall at the Wisconsin State Fair Park

- Ag Village
- Master Spas Pavilion
- Milwaukee Mile
- Pettit National Ice Center
- RV park
- Special Guest Centers
- Tommy G. Thompson Youth Center
- Wisconsin Exposition Center
- Wisconsin Products Pavilion
- Parks of Milwaukee
