= 1939 NFL season =

American football season

Regular season
- Duration: September 10 – December 10, 1939
- East Champions: New York Giants
- West Champions: Green Bay Packers

Championship Game
- Champions: Green Bay Packers

NFL teams: West, East

The 1939 NFL season was the 20th regular season of the National Football League. Before the season, NFL president Joseph Carr died, and Carl Storck was named to replace him.

An NFL game was televised for the first time when NBC broadcast the October 22 Philadelphia Eagles at Brooklyn Dodgers game at Ebbets Field in Brooklyn (the Dodgers won 23-14). The experimental broadcast was broadcast only to viewers in New York and Albany; regular broadcasting of NFL games would not begin until 1951.

The season ended when the Green Bay Packers defeated the New York Giants in the NFL Championship Game.

== Season history ==
=== Draft ===
The 1939 NFL draft was held on December 9, 1938, at New York City's New Yorker Hotel. A total of 22 rounds of selections were made, with only the five lowest-finishing teams allowed to select players in rounds 2 and 4 as a means of building parity. Only the five highest-finishing teams were allowed to select players in the final two rounds so that each team had the same number of potential rookies for the coming season.

Thus, a total of 20 players were chosen by each of the 10 teams in the 1939 draft.

With the first pick, the Chicago Cardinals selected center Ki Aldrich from Texas Christian University (TCU). The Chicago Bears picked future Hall of Fame quarterback Sid Luckman of Columbia University with the second overall selection. Winner of the 1938 Heisman Award, quarterback Davey O'Brien of TCU, was selected with the fourth pick of Round 1 by the Philadelphia Eagles.

=== Attendance ===
A total of 55 regular season contests were held by the National Football League during the 1939 season, with each of the league's ten teams playing an 11-game schedule. For the fourth consecutive year, the league set a new record for total attendance of 1,280,332 recorded for the regular season. An additional 32,279 people attended the 1939 league championship playoff game, for a 56-game total of 1,312,611 — an increase of 12.3% over the previous year.

Another 262,678 made their way to one of the nine all-star games held during the year.

The New York Giants led the league in attendance, with 233,301 fans attending one of the team's six home dates — an average of 38,884 people per contest. The Detroit Lions were the second leading draw, with a total attendance of 185,061 for their six home games (30,844 average), with the Washington Redskins in third place, with a six-game home attendance of 164,509 (27,418 average).

Three teams failed to break the 100,000 mark for the year, with the Pittsburgh Pirates the league's poorest draw, seating only 58,686 fans for five home dates — an average of just 11,737 fans per game.

The biggest crowd of the year was recorded on December 3 at the Polo Grounds in New York City, when a crowd of 62,543 assembled to see the Giants do battle against the visiting Redskins.

=== Division races ===
Though both the Giants and the Packers finished a game ahead of their closest division rivals, both clinched their divisions on December 3, the final day of the 11-game regular season. The New York Giants and Washington Redskins had played to a 0–0 tie earlier in the season, and both had 8–1–1 records when they met at New York's Polo Grounds before a crowd of 62,404. The Giants did not reach the end zone, but three field goals were enough for a controversial 9–7 win and the division title, in which a disputed missed Washington field goal in the final seconds was the deciding factor.

The Western Division race was between the Lions, Bears and Packers. Detroit was unbeaten after four games, but on October 22, Green Bay beat them 26–7 to give both teams records of 4–1–0. The same day, the 4–1 Bears lost 13–16 to the Giants to fall to 4–2.

On November 5, Week 9 of the season, the Lions beat the Giants 18–14, while the Bears beat the Packers 30–27, giving Detroit the lead at 6–1–0. The next week (November 12), the Bears beat the Lions 23–13, and the Packers beat the Eagles 23–16, tying Detroit and Green Bay at 6–2–0, half a game ahead of the 6–3–0 Bears. On November 19, the Lions lost to the Rams, 3–14, while the Packers and Bears both won. On November 26, the Bears closed their season at 8–3–0 after a 48–7 win over the Cardinals, while the Packers edged the Rams, 7–6 to reach 8–2–0. Green Bay was behind 7–3 at halftime in its season ender at Detroit, and a loss would have forced a playoff for the Western Division, but Clarke Hinkle's touchdown in the final quarter gave the Packers a 12–7 win and the division title.

=== NFL Championship Game ===
Green Bay 27, N.Y. Giants 0, at State Fair Park, West Allis, Wisconsin, December 10, 1939

== Results ==
=== Final standings ===
NFL Eastern Division
	W	L	T	PCT	DIV	PF	PA	STK
New York Giants	9	1	1	.900	7–0–1	168	85	W4
Washington Redskins	8	2	1	.800	6–1–1	242	94	L1
Brooklyn Dodgers	4	6	1	.400	3–4–1	108	219	L3
Pittsburgh Pirates	1	9	1	.100	1–7	114	216	W1
Philadelphia Eagles	1	9	1	.100	1–6–1	105	200	L2

Note: Tie games were not officially counted in the standings until 1972.

NFL Western Division
	W	L	T	PCT	DIV	PF	PA	STK
Green Bay Packers	9	2	0	.818	6–2	233	153	W4
Chicago Bears	8	3	0	.727	6–2	298	157	W4
Detroit Lions	6	5	0	.545	4–4	145	150	L4
Cleveland Rams	5	5	1	.500	4–4	195	164	W1
Chicago Cardinals	1	10	0	.091	0–8	84	254	L8

=== Statistical leaders ===
Statistic	Name	Team	Yards
Passing	Davey O'Brien	Philadelphia	1324
Rushing	Bill Osmanski	Chicago Bears	699
Receiving	Don Hutson	Green Bay	846

=== Awards ===
Joe F. Carr Trophy (Most Valuable Player)	Parker Hall, Halfback, Cleveland

== Changes ==
=== Major rule changes ===
- The penalty for an ineligible receiver who touches a forward pass is 15 yards and a loss of down.
- The penalty for an ineligible receiver who is downfield prior to a forward pass being thrown is 15 yards and a loss of down.
- If a kickoff goes out of bounds after only being touched by members of the receiving team, the receiving team takes possession of the ball at that inbounds spot.

=== Coaching changes ===
- Chicago Cardinals: Milan Creighton was replaced by Ernie Nevers.
- Cleveland Rams: Dutch Clark became the new Rams head coach. Hugo Bezdek had been released after three games into 1938, and Art Lewis served as interim for the last eight of that previous season.
- Detroit Lions: Dutch Clark was replaced by Gus Henderson.
- Pittsburgh Pirates: Johnny Blood was released after three games into 1939. Walt Kiesling was hired as his replacement.

=== Stadium changes ===
The Cleveland Rams moved from Shaw Stadium to Cleveland Municipal Stadium
