= 1940 Chicago Bears season =

NFL team season

- Head coach: George Halas
- Home stadium: Wrigley Field

Results
- Record: 8–3
- Division place: 1st NFL Western
- Playoffs: Won NFL Championship (at Redskins) 73–0

The 1940 season was the Chicago Bears' 21st in the National Football League. The team matched on their 8–3 record from 1939 under head coach George Halas. Behind NFL great Sid Luckman, the club gained a berth in the NFL Championship. There the club stormed the Washington Redskins under the brand new formation known as the T formation to claim their fourth league title. This was the first of four consecutive NFL Western titles for the Bears.

== Offseason ==
=== NFL draft ===
1940 Chicago Bears draft
Round	Pick	Player	Position	College	Notes
1	7	Clyde "Bulldog" Turner * ^{†}	C	Hardin–Simmons	
3	22	Ken Kavanaugh *	E	LSU	
5	37	Ed Kolman *	T	Temple	
6	47	John Woudenberg *	T	Denver	Signed with the Pittsburgh Steelers
7	57	Len Akin	G	Baylor	Signed with the Milwaukee Chiefs; later signed with the Bears in 1942
8	67	Jim Fordham	B	Georgia	Later signed with the Bears in 1944
9	77	Hamp Pool *	E	Stanford	
10	87	Tom Pace	B	Utah	
11	97	Lee Artoe *	T	California	
12	107	Bill McCubbin	E	Kentucky	
13	117	Harry Clarke *	B	West Virginia	
14	127	Frank Crisci	T	Case Tech	
15	137	Sherm Barnes	E	Baylor	
17	157	Wilbur White	T	Bradley	
18	167	Ralph Schlosser	C	Gonzaga	
19	177	John Popov	B	Cincinnati	
20	187	Young Bussey *	B	LSU	Signed with the Newark Bears; later signed with Chicago in 1941
21	192	Ray McLean *	B	Saint Anselm	
22	197	Walt Kichefski	E	Miami (FL)	Signed with the Pittsburgh Steelers
Made roster † Pro Football Hall of Fame * Made at least one Pro Bowl during career

== Roster ==
1940 Chicago Bears final roster
Quarterbacks: 42 Sid Luckman P/S; 33 Bernie Masterson S; 22 Solly Sherman S; 17 Bob Snyder RB/CB/S/K; Ends/Receivers: 51 Ken Kavanaugh; 7 Eggs Manske; 20 Bob Nowaskey; 14 Dick Plasman; 76 Hamp Pool; 6 John Siegal; 30 George Wilson	Linemen/Linebackers: 35 Lee Artoe T/DT; 26 Al Baisi G/DG; 24 Frank Bausch C/LB; 82 Ray Bray G/DG; 23 Aldo Forte G/DG; 21 Dan Fortmann G/DG; 29 Ed Kolman T/DT; 27 Joe Mihal T/DT; 16 George Musso G/DG; 13 Joe Stydahar T/DT/K; 34 Jack Torrance T/DT; 66 Bulldog Turner C/LB	Backs: 4 Harry Clarke RB/CB; 2 Gary Famiglietti FB/LB; 10 Jack Manders RB/CB/K; 11 Joe Maniaci FB/LB; 5 George McAfee RB/CB/P; 57 Ray McLean RB/CB; 25 Ray Nolting RB/CB; 9 Bill Osmanski FB/LB; 48 Bob Swisher RB/CB; Special teams: 19 Phil Martinovich K; Rookies in italics

== Regular season ==
=== Schedule ===
Game	Date	Opponent	Result	Record	Venue	Attendance	Recap	Sources
1	September 22	at **Green Bay Packers**	**W** 41–10	1–0	City Stadium	22,557	Recap	
2	September 25	at **Chicago Cardinals**	**L** 7–21	1–1	Comiskey Park	23,181	Recap	
—	Bye							
3	October 6	at **Cleveland Rams**	**W** 21–14	2–1	Cleveland Stadium	18,998	Recap	
4	October 13	**Detroit Lions**	**W** 7–0	3–1	Wrigley Field	34,217	Recap	
5	October 20	Brooklyn Dodgers	**W** 16–7	4–1	Wrigley Field	31,101	Recap	
6	October 27	at New York Giants	**W** 37–21	5–1	Polo Grounds	44,219	Recap	
7	November 3	**Green Bay Packers**	**W** 14–7	6–1	Wrigley Field	45,434	Recap	
8	November 10	at **Detroit Lions**	**L** 14–17	6–2	Briggs Stadium	21,735	Recap	
9	November 17	at Washington Redskins	**L** 3–7	6–3	Griffith Stadium	35,331	Recap	
10	November 24	**Cleveland Rams**	**W** 47–25	7–3	Wrigley Field	20,717	Recap	
11	December 1	**Chicago Cardinals**	**W** 31–23	8–3	Wrigley Field	13,902	Recap	
Note: Intra-division opponents are in **bold** text.

=== Game summaries ===
==== Game 1: at Green Bay Packers ====
Game 1: Chicago Bears at Green Bay Packers – Game summary

Quarter	1	2	3	4	Total
**Bears**	7	7	14	13	**41**
Packers	3	0	7	0	**10**

at City Stadium, Green Bay, Wisconsin

- Date: September 22
- Game attendance: 22,557
- Box score

Game information

**First quarter**

- GB – Tiny Engebretsen 25-yard field goal. Packers 3–0.
- CHI – George McAfee 93-yard kickoff return (Dick Plasman kick). Bears 7–3.

**Second quarter**

- CHI – Bill Osmanski 1-yard run (Jack Manders kick). Bears 14–3.

**Third quarter**

- CHI – Ray Nolting 97-yard kickoff return (Bob Snyder kick). Bears 21–3.
- GB – Don Hutson 35-yard pass from Arnie Herber (Don Hutson kick). Bears 21–10.
- CHI – Ken Kavanaugh 8-yard pass from George McAfee (Lee Artoe kick). Bears 28–10.

**Fourth quarter**

- CHI – George McAfee 9-yard run (kick failed). Bears 34–10.
- CHI – Ken Kavanaugh 39-yard pass from Bob Snyder (Jack Manders kick). Bears 41–10.

**Top passers**

- CHI – Sid Luckman – 3/5, 144 yards, INT
- GB – Cecil Isbell – 7/16, 98 yards, 3 INT

**Top rushers**

- CHI – George McAfee – 3 rushes, 56 yards, TD
- GB – Clarke Hinkle – 10 rushes, 62 yards

**Top receivers**

- CHI – Bob Swisher – 2 receptions, 106 yards
- GB – Don Hutson – 5 receptions, 86 yards, TD

==== Game 2: at Chicago Cardinals ====
Game 2: Chicago Bears at Chicago Cardinals – Game summary

Quarter	1	2	3	4	Total
Bears	0	7	0	0	**7**
**Cardinals**	7	7	0	7	**21**

at Comiskey Park, Chicago, Illinois

- Date: September 25
- Game attendance: 23,181
- Box score

Game information

**First quarter**

- CRD – Johnny Hall 36-yard pass from Hugh McCullough (Lou Zontini kick). Cardinals 7–0.

**Second quarter**

- CRD – Marshall Goldberg 7-yard run (Lou Zontini kick). Cardinals 14–0.
- CHI – Harry Clarke 8-yard run (Jack Manders kick). Cardinals 14–7.

**Third quarter**

- No scoring plays

**Fourth quarter**

- CRD – Gaynell Tinsley 10-yard pass from Hugh McCullough (Hugh McCullough kick). Cardinals 21–7.

**Top passers**

- CHI – Sid Luckman – 6/16, 121 yards, INT
- CRD – Hugh McCullough – 5/5, 56 yards, 2 TD

**Top rushers**

- CHI – Ray Nolting – 7 rushes, 45 yards
- CRD – Lloyd Madden – 1 rush, 62 yards

**Top receivers**

- CHI – George McAfee – 2 receptions, 37 yards
- CRD – Johnny Hall – 1 reception, 36 yards, TD

==== Game 3: at Cleveland Rams ====
Game 3: Chicago Bears at Cleveland Rams – Game summary

Quarter	1	2	3	4	Total
**Bears**	0	14	7	0	**21**
Rams	0	0	14	0	**14**

at Cleveland Stadium, Cleveland, Ohio

- Date: October 6
- Game attendance: 18,998
- Box score

Game information

**First quarter**

- No scoring plays

**Second quarter**

- CHI – George McAfee 14-yard run (Bob Snyder kick). Bears 7–0.
- CHI – Bernie Masterson 1-yard run (Dick Plasman kick). Bears 14–0.

**Third quarter**

- CLE – Parker Hall 12-yard run (Chet Adams kick). Bears 14–7.
- CHI – Gary Famiglietti 1-yard run (Jack Manders kick). Bears 21–7.
- CLE – Dante Magnani 25-yard pass from Parker Hall (Chet Adams kick). Bears 21–14.

**Fourth quarter**

- No scoring plays

**Top passers**

- CHI – Bernie Masterson – 4/7, 52 yards, INT
- CLE – Parker Hall – 10/22, 126 yards, TD, 2 INT

**Top rushers**

- CHI – Joe Maniaci – 7 rushes, 44 yards
- CLE – Parker Hall – 9 rushes, 46 yards, TD

**Top receivers**

- CHI – Harry Clarke – 1 reception, 17 yards
- CLE – Johnny Drake – 2 receptions, 38 yards

==== Game 4: vs. Detroit Lions ====
Game 4: Detroit Lions at Chicago Bears – Game summary

Quarter	1	2	3	4	Total
Lions	0	0	0	0	**0**
**Bears**	7	0	0	0	**7**

at Wrigley Field, Chicago, Illinois

- Date: October 13
- Game attendance: 34,217
- Box score

Game information

**First quarter**

- CHI – Bill Osmanski 34-yard run (Jack Manders kick). Bears 7–0.

**Second quarter**

- No scoring plays

**Third quarter**

- No scoring plays

**Fourth quarter**

- No scoring plays

**Top passers**

- DET – Whizzer White – 7/13, 66 yards
- CHI – Sid Luckman – 3/4, 15 yards, INT

**Top rushers**

- DET – Whizzer White – 20 rushes, 59 yards
- CHI – Gary Famiglietti – 13 rushes, 65 yards

**Top receivers**

- DET – Lloyd Cardwell – 2 receptions, 26 yards
- CHI – Ken Kavanaugh – 1 reception, 18 yards

==== Game 5: vs. Brooklyn Dodgers ====
Game 5: Brooklyn Dodgers at Chicago Bears – Game summary

Quarter	1	2	3	4	Total
Dodgers	0	0	7	0	**7**
**Bears**	0	0	7	9	**16**

at Wrigley Field, Chicago, Illinois

- Date: October 20
- Game attendance: 31,101
- Box score

Game information

**First quarter**

- No scoring plays

**Second quarter**

- No scoring plays

**Third quarter**

- CHI – George Wilson 15-yard pass from Solly Sherman (Jack Manders kick). Bears 7–0.
- BKN – Ace Parker 71-yard pass from Banks McFadden (Ace Parker kick). Tied 7–7.

**Fourth quarter**

- CHI – Joe Maniaci 27-yard run (kick failed). Bears 13–7.
- CHI – Bob Snyder 47-yard field goal. Bears 16–7.

**Top passers**

- BKN – Ace Parker – 5/15, 85 yards, INT
- CHI – Sid Luckman – 4/11, 51 yards, 2 INT

**Top rushers**

- BKN – Pug Manders – 5 rushes, 38 yards
- CHI – Joe Maniaci – 13 rushes, 77 yards, TD

**Top receivers**

- BKN – Ace Parker – 1 reception, 71 yards, TD
- CHI – Dick Plasman – 1 reception, 38 yards

==== Game 6: at New York Giants ====
Game 6: Chicago Bears at New York Giants – Game summary

Quarter	1	2	3	4	Total
**Bears**	7	23	7	0	**37**
Giants	0	7	14	0	**21**

at Polo Grounds, Manhattan, New York

- Date: October 27
- Game attendance: 44,219
- Box score

==== Game 7: vs. Green Bay Packers ====
Game 7: Green Bay Packers at Chicago Bears – Game summary

Quarter	1	2	3	4	Total
Packers	0	7	0	0	**7**
**Bears**	7	7	0	0	**14**

at Wrigley Stadium, Chicago, Illinois

- Date: November 3
- Game attendance: 45,434
- Box score

==== Game 8: at Detroit Lions ====
Game 8: Chicago Bears at Detroit Lions – Game summary

Quarter	1	2	3	4	Total
Bears	0	7	7	0	**14**
**Lions**	3	0	7	7	**17**

at Briggs Stadium, Detroit, Michigan

- Date: November 10
- Game attendance: 21,735
- Box score

==== Game 9: at Washington Redskins ====
Game 9: Chicago Bears at Washington Redskins – Game summary

Quarter	1	2	3	4	Total
Bears	3	0	0	0	**3**
**Redskins**	0	7	0	0	**7**

at Griffith Stadium, Washington, D.C.

- Date: November 17
- Game attendance: 35,331
- Box score

==== Game 10: vs. Cleveland Rams ====
Game 10: Cleveland Rams at Chicago Bears – Game summary

Quarter	1	2	3	4	Total
Rams	7	0	6	12	**25**
**Bears**	13	10	14	10	**47**

at Wrigley Stadium, Chicago, Illinois

- Date: November 24
- Game attendance: 20,717
- Box score

==== Game 11: vs. Chicago Cardinals ====
Game 11: Chicago Cardinals at Chicago Bears – Game summary

Quarter	1	2	3	4	Total
Cardinals	0	0	0	23	**23**
**Bears**	17	14	0	0	**31**

at Wrigley Field, Chicago, Illinois

- Date: December 1
- Game attendance: 13,902
- Box score

== Standings ==
NFL Western Division
	W	L	T	PCT	DIV	PF	PA	STK
Chicago Bears	8	3	0	.727	6–2	238	152	W2
Green Bay Packers	6	4	1	.600	4–3–1	238	155	T1
Detroit Lions	5	5	1	.500	4–3–1	138	153	L1
Cleveland Rams	4	6	1	.400	2–5–1	171	191	T1
Chicago Cardinals	2	7	2	.222	2–5–1	139	222	L3

Note: Tie games were not officially counted in the standings until 1972.

== NFL Championship Game ==
1940 NFL Championship Game
Chicago Bears at Washington Redskins – Game summary

Quarter	1	2	3	4	Total
Bears	21	7	26	19	73
Redskins	0	0	0	0	0

at Griffith Stadium, Washington, D.C.

- Date: December 8
- Game time: 12:30 p.m. CST / 1:30 p.m. EST
- Game attendance: 36,034
- Referee: William "Red" Friesall
- Box score

Game information

First quarter

- CHI – Bill Osmanski 68-yard run (Jack Manders kick). Bears 7–0
- CHI – Sid Luckman 1-yard run (Bob Snyder kick). Bears 14–0
- CHI – Joe Maniaci 42-yard run (Phil Martinovich kick). Bears 21–0

Second Quarter

- CHI – Ken Kavanaugh 30-yard pass from Luckman (Bob Snyder kick). Bears 28–0

Third Quarter

- CHI – Hamp Pool 15-yard interception return (Dick Plasman kick). Bears 35–0
- CHI – Ray Nolting 23-yard run (kick failed). Bears 41–0
- CHI – George McAfee 35-yard interception return (Joe Stydahar kick). Bears 48–0
- CHI – Bulldog Turner 20-yard interception return (kick failed). Bears 54–0

Fourth Quarter

- CHI – Harry Clarke 44-yard run (kick failed). Bears 60–0
- CHI – Gary Famiglietti 2-yard run (Joe Maniaci pass from Solly Sherman). Bears 67–0
- CHI – Harry Clarke 1-yard run (pass failed). Bears 73–0

Top passers

- CHI – Sid Luckman – 3/4, 88 yards, TD
- WAS – Sammy Baugh – 10/17, 102 yards, 2 INT

Top rushers

- CHI – Bill Osmanski – 10 rushes, 109 yards, TD
- WAS – Frankie Filchock – 2 rushes, 20 yards

Top receivers

- CHI – Joe Maniaci – 3 receptions, 39 yards
- WAS – Wayne Millner – 5 receptions, 84 yards

The Chicago Bears defeated the Washington Redskins 73–0 in the NFL's biggest scoring and most lopsided game in NFL history.

== All-Star Game ==
The Bears defeated the NFL All-Stars 28–14 on December 29, 1940.
