= 1939 Chicago Bears season =

NFL team season

- Head coach: George Halas
- Home stadium: Wrigley Field

Results
- Record: 8–3
- Division place: 2nd NFL Western
- Playoffs: Did not qualify

The 1939 Chicago Bears season was their 20th regular season completed in the National Football League. They finished second in the Western Division with an 8–3 record. The Bears started the season well, winning 4 of their first 5 games. However, two mid-season losses to New York and Detroit cost them the Division to Green Bay. The Packers went on to win the NFL championship.

== Season highlights ==
The Bears showed improvement from 1938, adding two new players who contributed immediately and would be part of the Chicago teams of the 1940s. Overall, the Bears had a strong offense, leading the NFL in scoring, touchdowns, total yards (averaging 364 yards per game), rushing yards, rushing average per carry, rushing touchdowns, passing yards, and passing yards per attempt.The club also led the NFL with 22.1 average yards per pass completion. The T-formation was beginning to demonstrate itself as a viable passing scheme, particularly regarding the deep game.

=== Luckman Arrives ===
Sid Luckman was a Single Wing tailback at Columbia University before joining the Bears. Coach Halas traded with Pittsburgh for the rights to Luckman, seeing potential to run the complicated T-formation in the relatively unknown player. It took a $5,000 bonus to convince Luckman to sign with the Bears. Bernie Masterson continued to be the primary quarterback, but Luckman played more in the second half of the season. Luckman was a more accurate passer than Masterson, with a flair for the long ball. His first NFL touchdown pass was a 68-yard bomb to Dick Plasman in the fourth quarter of the October 22 game against the Giants, a game the Bears lost despite Luckman leading a furious fourth quarter comeback. By the end of the year, Luckman was playing in the first half ahead of Masterson; he finished the season with 636 yards passing, completing 23 of 51 attempts, with 5 touchdowns and 4 interceptions. He also had an interception return for a touchdown.

=== Osmanski ===
The other major rookie performer was Bill Osmanski from Holy Cross, a hard-running fullback who led the league in rushing with 699 yards, averaging 5.8 yards per carry and finishing with 7 rushing touchdowns. Osmanski possessed great speed and was a threat to go all the way from anywhere on the field; he burned the Cardinals with an 86-yard run and the Eagles with a 65-yard scamper. Osmanski's arrival freed up running room for Joe Maniaci, who averaged 7.1 yards per carry for his 544 yards.

=== Other top performances ===
The cover of the program for the November 5 game against the Packers featured running back Joe Maniaci.

Dick Plasman and Les McDonald continued to play well at end, combining for 35 receptions and 6 touchdowns. Jack Manders continued to kick well in his last season and led the team in scoring. The interior line continued to be strong, with Bausch, Fortmann, Stydahar, and Musso representing one of the strongest units in football. The defense fell down a bit this season, and probably cost the Bears the division, allowing 157 points including more than 20 four times. The pieces were almost in place for the Bears to dominate the league, but that would have to wait for the next decade.

== Schedule ==
Week	Date	Opponent	Result	Record	Venue
2	September 15	Cleveland Rams	W 30–21	1–0	Soldier Field
3	September 24	Green Bay Packers	L 16–21	1–1	City Stadium
4	October 2	Pittsburgh Pirates	W 32–0	2–1	Forbes Field
5	October 8	Cleveland Rams	W 35–21	3–1	Cleveland Municipal Stadium
6	October 15	Chicago Cardinals	W 44–7	4–1	Wrigley Field
7	October 22	New York Giants	L 13–16	4–2	Polo Grounds
8	October 29	Detroit Lions	L 0–10	4–3	Wrigley Field
9	November 5	Green Bay Packers	W 30–27	5–3	Wrigley Field
10	November 12	Detroit Lions	W 23–13	6–3	Briggs Stadium
11	November 19	Philadelphia Eagles	W 27–14	7–3	Wrigley Field
12	November 23	Chicago Cardinals	W 48–7	8–3	Wrigley Field

== Roster ==
1939 Chicago Bears final roster
Quarterbacks: 42 Sid Luckman RB/CB/S/P; 33 Bernie Masterson S; 22 Solly Sherman CB/S; Ends/Receivers: 7 Eggs Manske; 76 Les McDonald; 14 Dick Plasman K; 6 John Siegal; 30 George Wilson	Linemen/Linebackers: 35 Dick Bassi G/DG; 24 Frank Bausch C/LB; 82 Ray Bray G/DG; 28 Chet Chesney C/LB; 23 Aldo Forte G/DG; 21 Dan Fortmann G/DG; 16 George Musso G/DG; 13 Joe Stydahar T/DT/K; 12 Frank Sullivan C/LB; 29 Russ Thompson T/DT; 34 Jack Torrance T/DT; 27 Milt Trost T/DT	Backs: 2 Gary Famiglietti FB/LB; 5 Bob MacLeod RB/CB; 10 Jack Manders RB/CB/K; 11 Joe Maniaci FB/LB/K; 25 Ray Nolting RB/CB/P; 9 Bill Osmanski FB/LB; 57 Billy Patterson RB/QB/CB/S/P; 31 Dick Schweidler RB/CB; 17 Bob Snyder RB/CB; 48 Bob Swisher RB/CB; Rookies in italics

== Future Hall of Fame players ==
- Dan Fortmann, guard
- Sid Luckman, quarterback (rookie from Columbia University)
- George Musso, guard
- Joe Stydahar, tackle

== Standings ==
NFL Western Division
	W	L	T	PCT	DIV	PF	PA	STK
Green Bay Packers	9	2	0	.818	6–2	233	153	W4
Chicago Bears	8	3	0	.727	6–2	298	157	W4
Detroit Lions	6	5	0	.545	4–4	145	150	L4
Cleveland Rams	5	5	1	.500	4–4	195	164	W1
Chicago Cardinals	1	10	0	.091	0–8	84	254	L8

Note: Tie games were not officially counted in the standings until 1972.
