= 1942 Chicago Bears season =

NFL team season

- Head coach: George Halas; Hunk Anderson; Luke Johnsos
- Home stadium: Wrigley Field

Results
- Record: 11–0
- Division place: 1st NFL Western
- Playoffs: Lost NFL Championship (at Redskins) 6–14

The 1942 season was the Chicago Bears' 23rd in the National Football League. The team improved on their 10–1 record in 1941 and finished at 11–0, under head coach George Halas (who left for World War II in November) and temporary co-coaches Hunk Anderson and Luke Johnsos. The Bears were denied a three-peat and an undefeated season when they lost to the Washington Redskins in the year's title game. In the previous two NFL championship games, the Bears defeated the Redskins, 73–0, and then the Giants, 37–9.

The 1942 Bears were "the single most dominant team in the history of the NFL," according to Cold Hard Football Facts. "The 1942 Bears went 11–0, scored 376 points and surrendered just 84 points. They also have the lowest passer rating allowed in NFL history, with opposing quarterbacks having a passer rating of just 21.4. That dominant team, like the undefeated 2007 Patriots, was upset in the NFL championship game."

== Schedule ==
Game	Date	Opponent	Result	Record	Venue	Attendance	Recap	Sources
1	September 27	at **Green Bay Packers**	**W** 44–28	1–0	City Stadium	20,007	Recap	
2	October 4	at **Cleveland Rams**	**W** 21–7	2–0	League Park	17,167	Recap	
3	October 11	**Chicago Cardinals**	**W** 41–14	3–0	Wrigley Field	~38,500	Recap	
4	October 18	New York Giants	**W** 26–7	4–0	Wrigley Field	~32,000	Recap	
5	October 25	Philadelphia Eagles	**W** 45–14	5–0	Wrigley Field	15,372	Recap	
6	November 1	**Detroit Lions**	**W** 16–0	6–0	Wrigley Field	12,205	Recap	
7	November 8	at Brooklyn Dodgers	**W** 35–0	7–0	Ebbets Field	31,643	Recap	
8	November 15	**Green Bay Packers**	**W** 38–7	8–0	Wrigley Field	42,787	Recap	
9	November 22	at **Detroit Lions**	**W** 42–0	9–0	Briggs Stadium	17,348	Recap	
10	November 29	**Cleveland Rams**	**W** 47–0	10–0	Wrigley Field	13,195	Recap	
11	December 6	at **Chicago Cardinals**	**W** 21–7	11–0	Comiskey Park	8,251	Recap	
Note: Intra-division opponents are in **bold** text.

== Standings ==
Program for the October 25 home meeting with the Philadelphia Eagles.

NFL Western Division
	W	L	T	PCT	DIV	PF	PA	STK
Chicago Bears	11	0	0	1.000	8–0	376	84	W11
Green Bay Packers	8	2	1	.800	6–2	300	215	W2
Cleveland Rams	5	6	0	.455	3–5	150	207	L1
Chicago Cardinals	3	8	0	.273	3–5	98	209	L6
Detroit Lions	0	11	0	.000	0–8	38	263	L11

Note: Tie games were not officially counted in the standings until 1972.

== Postseason ==
Round	Date	Opponent	Result	Record	Venue	Attendance	Recap	Sources
NFL Championship	December 13	at Washington Redskins	L 6–14	0–1	Griffith Stadium	36,006	Recap	

== Roster ==
1942 Chicago Bears final roster
Quarterbacks: 42 Sid Luckman S/P; 48 Charlie O'Rourke S/P; Backs: 4 Harry Clarke RB/CB; 2 Gary Famiglietti FB/LB; 8 Hugh Gallarneau RB/CB; 7 Bill Geyer RB/CB; 5 Frank Maznicki RB/CB/K; 57 Ray McLean RB/CB; 11 Frank Morris FB/LB; 25 Ray Nolting RB/CB; 9 Bill Osmanski FB/LB; 10 John Petty FB/LB	Linemen/Linebackers: 31 Len Akin G/DG; 35 Lee Artoe T/DT/K; 82 Ray Bray G/DG; 36 Stu Clarkson C/LB; 14 Chuck Drulis G/DG; 21 Dan Fortmann G/DG; 19 Bill Hempel T/DT; 26 Al Hoptowit T/DT; 17 Nick Kerasiotis G/DG; 29 Ed Kolman T/DT; 15 Al Matuza C/LB; 16 George Musso G/DG; 13 Joe Stydahar T/DT/K; 66 Bulldog Turner C/LB	Ends/Receivers: 23 Connie Mack Berry; 20 Bob Nowaskey; 76 Hamp Pool; 6 John Siegal; 51 Clint Wager; 30 George Wilson; Reserve: Bill Rogers T/DT (inactive); Rookies in italics
