= Ray McLean =

American football player and coach (1915–1964)

No. 57
- Position: Halfback

Personal information
- Born: December 6, 1915; Lowell, Massachusetts, U.S.
- Died: March 4, 1964 (aged 48); Ann Arbor, Michigan, U.S.
- Listed height: 5 ft 10 in (1.78 m)
- Listed weight: 168 lb (76 kg)

Career information
- High school: Cushing Academy (Ashburnham, Massachusetts)
- College: St. Anselm (NH) (1936-1939)
- NFL draft: 1940: 21st round, 192nd overall pick

Career history

Playing
- Chicago Bears (1940–1947)

Coaching
- Lewis University (1948–1950) Head coach; Chicago Rockets (1948) Assistant coach; Green Bay Packers (1951–1953) Backfield coach; Green Bay Packers (1953) Interim head coach; Green Bay Packers (1954–1957) Backfield coach; Green Bay Packers (1958) Head coach; Detroit Lions (1959–1963) Backfield coach

Awards and highlights
- 4× NFL champion (1940, 1941, 1943, 1946); 2× Pro Bowl (1940, 1941)

Career NFL statistics
- Rushing yards: 412
- Rushing average: 2.7
- Receptions: 103
- Receiving yards: 2,232
- Total touchdowns: 30
- Stats at Pro Football Reference

Head coaching record
- Career: NFL: 1–12–1 (.107); College: 19–16 (.543)
- Coaching profile at Pro Football Reference

Raymond Tuttle "Scooter" McLean (December 6, 1915 – March 4, 1964) was an American professional football player and coach at both the collegiate and professional levels. A member of four NFL championships with the Chicago Bears as a player in 1940, 1941, 1943, and 1946, he may be best remembered for preceding Vince Lombardi as head coach of the Green Bay Packers in 1958.

== Early life ==
Born in Lowell, Massachusetts and raised in Concord, New Hampshire, McLean went to prep school at Cushing Academy in Ashburnham, Massachusetts, then played both football and basketball in New Hampshire at St. Anselm College in Goffstown.

== Playing career ==
McLean was selected by the Chicago Bears in the 21st round of the 1940 NFL draft and played eight years with the team, and also found time during the offseason to play semipro baseball. His real last name is "MacLean," and was changed because the press consistently misspelled it.

Common for the era, McLean played on both sides of the ball, catching 103 passes for over 2,200 yards and 21 touchdowns, while also gaining 412 yards via the running game. On defense, he intercepted 18 opponent tosses, while his special teams work also sparkled with three punt returns for touchdowns, one an 89-yard dash against the crosstown Chicago Cardinals. In his final season in 1947, he also was the Bears' kicker.

McLean is also remembered for his successful drop-kicked extra point in the Bears' 37–9 championship game win over the New York Giants on December 21, 1941. For 64 years, this was the last score via this play in the NFL until New England Patriots' quarterback Doug Flutie's drop kicked conversion in a 28–26 loss to the Miami Dolphins in the regular season finale on January 1, 2006. Drop kicks had been a common part of the game until 1934, when the game's watermelon-shaped ball was replaced with the modern prolate spheroid, which made passing easier but drop kicking less reliable, led to their decline and virtual extinction. The last successfully drop-kicked field goal still belongs to player-coach Earl "Dutch" Clark of the Detroit Lions; it came from nine yards out in the second quarter of a 16–7 win over the Chicago Cardinals on September 19, 1937.

== NFL career statistics ==
Legend
	Won the NFL championship
	Led the league
**Bold**	Career high

=== Regular season ===
Year	Team	Games		Rushing					Receiving				
Year	Team	GP	GS	Att	Yds	Avg	Lng	TD	Rec	Yds	Avg	Lng	TD
1940	CHI	10	0	14	10	0.7	5	**1**	6	138	23.0	-	2
1941	CHI	10	0	13	78	**6.0**	21	**1**	5	84	16.8	40	1
1942	CHI	11	2	26	63	2.4	15	0	**19**	**571**	**30.1**	68	**8**
1943	CHI	10	0	**35**	**127**	3.6	**34**	**1**	18	435	24.2	66	2
1944	CHI	8	1	29	25	0.9	8	**1**	**19**	414	21.8	**86**	5
1945	CHI	5	1	9	22	2.4	15	0	8	117	14.6	43	0
1946	CHI	10	3	16	29	1.8	11	**1**	17	348	20.5	48	2
1947	CHI	12	0	10	58	5.8	24	0	11	125	11.4	19	1
		76	7	152	412	2.7	34	5	103	2,232	21.7	86	21

=== Playoffs ===
Year	Team	Games		Rushing					Receiving				
Year	Team	GP	GS	Att	Yds	Avg	Lng	TD	Rec	Yds	Avg	Lng	TD
1940	CHI	1	0	2	22	**11.0**	**19**	0	0	0	0.0	0	0
1941	CHI	2	0	**5**	**24**	4.8	-	0	1	5	5.0	5	0
1942	CHI	1	0	2	5	2.5	3	0	**4**	**46**	11.5	-	0
1943	CHI	1	0	1	-2	-2.0	-2	0	1	29	**29.0**	**29**	0
1946	CHI	1	0	3	6	2.0	-	0	0	0	0.0	0	0
		6	0	13	55	4.2	19	0	6	80	13.3	29	0

== Coaching career ==
=== Lewis College ===
On March 3, 1948, McLean signed a contract to serve as head coach of Lewis College in Lockport, Illinois, southwest of Chicago. To supplement his income during that first year, he also served as an assistant coach with the Chicago Rockets of the All-America Football Conference. During his first two seasons at Lewis, McLean's teams completely dominated, outscoring opponents 548–80 while compiling a 14–2 record. In 1950, the school moved to the much stronger Midlands Intercollegiate Athletic Conference, but McLean left after that campaign to become an assistant with the Packers in 1951.

=== Green Bay Packers ===
Working under second-year head coach Gene Ronzani, McLean watched the Packers struggle with a 3–9 mark in 1951, but then improved by three games the following year. However, after winning just twice in ten games in 1953, Ronzani resigned following a Thanksgiving Day loss at Detroit, with two games remaining. McLean and fellow Packer assistant Hugh Devore completed the season as co-head coaches; Green Bay lost both road games in California to extend the season's losing streak to five games and finish at 2–9–1.

McLean was the only assistant retained in 1954 by new head coach Lisle Blackbourn and returned to his role as the backfield coach. The Packers won four games in 1954 and were a .500 team in 1955, but a 17–31 (.354) record over four seasons led to another coaching change in Green Bay after the 1957 season, their first in the new City Stadium (renamed Lambeau Field in 1965). On January 6, Blackbourn was fired and the 42-year-old McLean was immediately elevated to the top position for 1958, but with only a one-year contract.

Unfortunately, the team bottomed-out under his leadership, which included players deciding how they should discipline themselves. The Packers finished the season with a franchise-worst 1–10–1 (.125) record, with a roster laden with future All-Pro and hall of fame players. McLean's contract expired on December 31 and he resigned days after the conclusion of the season, which opened the way for the hiring of Lombardi in January 1959.

=== Detroit Lions ===
McLean immediately found work as an assistant with the Detroit Lions, under former Bears teammate George Wilson, and served in that role for the next five years. Wilson, his road roommate in Chicago, had offered the job a year earlier before McLean became the head coach.

== Death ==
Midway through the 1963 season, McLean entered an Ann Arbor hospital and was diagnosed with cancer; he died several months later at age 48, leaving a wife and four children. He was buried in Michigan at Oakland Hills Memorial Gardens Cemetery in Novi.

== Head coaching record ==
=== College ===
Year	Team	Overall	Conference	Standing	Bowl/playoffs
Lewis Flyers (Badger-Illini Conference) (1948–1949)
1948	Lewis	6–2	5–1	T–1st	
1949	Lewis	9–0	6–0	1st	
Lewis Flyers (Midlands Conference) (1950)
1950	Lewis	4–4	1–2	T–3rd	
Lewis:		19–6	12–3		
Total:		19–16			
National championship Conference title Conference division title or championship game berth
