= Al Baisi =

American football player (1917–2005)

No. 26, 63
- Position: Guard

Personal information
- Born: September 6, 1917; Norton, West Virginia, U.S.
- Died: April 15, 2005 (aged 87); Saint Paul, Minnesota, U.S.
- Listed height: 6 ft 0 in (1.83 m)
- Listed weight: 217 lb (98 kg)

Career information
- High school: Elkins (WV)
- College: West Virginia
- NFL draft: 1940: undrafted

Career history
- Chicago Bears (1940–1941, 1946); Philadelphia Eagles (1947)

Awards and highlights
- 3× NFL champion (1940-1941, 1946); 2× Pro Bowl (1940-1941)

Career NFL statistics
- Fumble recoveries: 1
- Stats at Pro Football Reference

Albert Frank Baisi (September 6, 1917 – April 16, 2005) was an American professional football player. He played professionally in the National Football League (NFL) with the Chicago Bears in 1940, 1941, and 1946 and with the Philadelphia Eagles in 1947. Baisi played college football at West Virginia University. In 1949, Baisi opened a bar named Alary's in St. Paul, Minnesota. His son Al Jr. continued to run Alary's until his death in 2015.
