= Harry Clarke (American football) =

American football player (1916–2005)

No. 4, 82, 87
- Positions: Running back, Defensive back

Personal information
- Born: December 1, 1916; Cumberland, Maryland, U.S.
- Died: December 31, 2005 (aged 89); Morgantown, West Virginia, U.S.
- Listed height: 6 ft 0 in (1.83 m)
- Listed weight: 186 lb (84 kg)

Career information
- High school: Uniontown (Uniontown, Pennsylvania)
- College: West Virginia (1936-1939)
- NFL draft: 1940: 13th round, 177th overall pick

Career history
- Chicago Bears (1940–1943); Los Angeles Dons (1946-1948); Chicago Rockets (1948)

Awards and highlights
- 3× NFL champion (1940, 1941, 1943); First-team All-Pro (1943); 2× Pro Bowl (1940, 1941)

Career NFL/AAFC statistics
- Rushing yards: 1,711
- Rushing average: 4.4
- Receptions: 51
- Receiving yards: 1,022
- Total touchdowns: 24
- Stats at Pro Football Reference

Harry Charles "Flash" Clarke (December 1, 1916 – December 31, 2005) was an American professional football player. He played halfback for four seasons for the Chicago Bears in the National Football League (NFL). He later played three seasons in the All-America Football Conference (AAFC). He played college football for West Virginia Mountaineers.

== College career ==
Harry Clarke set many records while playing for West Virginia University. He still holds some to this day. While at WVU Clarke rushed for 921 yards, which was a team record at the time, in the 1938 season. He was inducted into the university's hall of fame in 1977.

== Professional career ==
Clark was selected in the 13th round of the 1940 NFL draft. During his rookie season with the Chicago Bears, Clarke scored two touchdowns in the 1940 NFL Championship Game to help defeat the Washington Redskins 73–0.

After his fourth season with the Bears, Clarke was drafted into the Navy in 1943. After his time in the service, Clarke played in the All-American Football Conference from 1946 to 1948 for Los Angeles Dons, then returned to Chicago to play for the Rockets. According to some statistics, Clarke played for both the Dons and the Rockets in the 1948 season: 5 games for each team.

== NFL/AAFC career statistics ==
Legend
	Won the NFL Championship
**Bold**	Career high

Year	Team	Games		Rushing				Receiving			
Year	Team	GP	GS	Att	Yds	Avg	TD	Rec	Yds	Avg	TD
1940	CHI	11	0	56	258	4.6	2	3	80	26.7	0
1941	CHI	10	3	28	122	4.4	0	2	61	**30.5**	0
1942	CHI	10	7	58	273	**4.7**	**4**	6	131	21.8	2
1943	CHI	10	10	**120**	**556**	4.6	2	**23**	**535**	23.3	**7**
1946	LAD	14	2	62	250	4.0	0	10	123	12.3	2
1947	LAD	12	3	44	173	3.9	2	3	54	18.0	0
1948	LAD	2	2	6	22	3.7	0	3	19	6.3	0
1948	CHR	5	2	16	57	3.6	0	1	19	19.0	0
		74	29	390	1,711	4.4	10	51	1,022	20.0	11
