= Hamp Pool =

American football player, coach, and scout (1915–2000)

- Pool in 1953

No. 76, 55
- Position: End

Personal information
- Born: March 11, 1915; San Miguel, California, U.S.
- Died: May 26, 2000 (aged 85); Mariposa, California, U.S.
- Listed height: 6 ft 3 in (1.91 m)
- Listed weight: 221 lb (100 kg)

Career information
- High school: Paso Robles (Paso Robles, California)
- College: Stanford; California (1934); Army (1938-1939)
- NFL draft: 1940: 9th round, 77th overall pick

Career history

Playing
- Chicago Bears (1940–1943); Fort Pierce (1944); Miami Seahawks (1946)

Coaching
- Fort Pierce (1944–1945) Head coach; Miami Seahawks (1946) Co-head coach; Chicago Rockets (1947) Head coach; San Jose State (1948) Assistant coach; San Bernardino Valley (1949) Assistant coach; Los Angeles Rams (1950–1951) Backfield coach; Los Angeles Rams (1952–1954) Head coach; Toronto Argonauts (1957–1959) Head coach; Los Angeles Rams (1960–1962) Offensive coordinator

Awards and highlights
- As a player: 3× NFL champion (1940, 1941, 1943); 2× NFL All-Star (1940, 1941); As a coach: The Sporting News NFL Coach of the Year (1952)

Career NFL/AAFC statistics
- Receptions: 38
- Receiving yards: 903
- Receiving touchdowns: 11
- Stats at Pro Football Reference

Head coaching record
- Regular season: 26–19–2 (.574)
- Postseason: 0–1 (.000)
- Career: 26–20–2 (.563)
- Coaching profile at Pro Football Reference

Hampton John "Hamp" Pool (March 11, 1915 – May 26, 2000) was an American professional football player, coach and scout who was part of three National Football League (NFL) championship teams during his playing career and served as head coach for three professional teams.

== Playing career ==
Pool graduated from Paso Robles High School in Paso Robles, California in 1933, and played for the University of California, Berkeley's freshman football team that fall. After entering the United States Military Academy for one year, he returned to resume his career at Stanford University, playing as an end, and also performing for the school's track team.

In the 1940 NFL draft, he was a ninth round draft pick of the Chicago Bears and played four seasons with the Windy City team. During that stretch, he played at both fullback and end, catching 35 passes for 840 yards and scoring 11 touchdowns. His efforts helped the team to NFL titles in both 1940 and 1941, with Pool scoring one of the Bears' nine touchdowns in the 73–0 thrashing of the Washington Redskins in the 1940 title tilt. In 1942, the Bears were undefeated during the regular season, but were upset, 14–6, by those same Redskins in the NFL Championship game.

After his career was ended by a leg injury, Pool served as a player-coach for the Fort Pierce Naval Amphibious Base during the final two years of World War II, while also working as an underwater demolition officer. His 1943 unit finished undefeated, and in 1944, he made news when he refused to wear jersey number 14 out of respect for Green Bay Packers' standout Don Hutson. "No. 14 is Don Hutson's number, and nobody else should have that, certainly not me", said Pool.

== NFL career statistics ==
Legend
	Won the NFL Championship
**Bold**	Career high

Year	Team	Games		Receiving				
Year	Team	GP	GS	Rec	Yds	Avg	Lng	TD
1940	CHI	5	4	2	55	27.5	35	0
1941	CHI	7	0	5	101	20.2	56	1
1942	CHI	11	0	10	321	**32.1**	**64**	**5**
1943	CHI	10	0	**18**	**363**	20.2	42	**5**
		33	4	35	840	24.0	64	11

== Coaching career ==
When the conflict ended, Pool officially entered the coaching arena in 1946, serving as an assistant for the All-America Football Conference's Miami Seahawks under Jack Meagher. After the team had won just one of six contests during its inaugural campaign, Meagher resigned on October 22, with Pool and fellow assistant Hank Crisp taking over as co-head coaches.

After the Seahawks became the Baltimore Colts after the season, Pool stayed with the revamped franchise until accepting an assistant's position under Jim Crowley, who had been named head coach and general manager of the AAFC's Chicago Rockets. Crowley won only one of 11 games before turning the team over to Pool, who watched the team drop its final three contests.

In 1948, Pool returned to his native California to serve as an assistant under Bill Hubbard at San Jose State University. The Spartans finished with a 9–3 record, but Pool departed after the season to enter private business, but stayed connected to the sport as an assistant coach at San Bernardino Valley College. On March 3, 1950, Pool returned to the professional ranks when his former Bears teammate, Joe Stydahar, hired him as backfield coach of the Los Angeles Rams.

Over the next two seasons, Pool handled the team's offense and defense, the former being one of the most potent in league history. During this period, the Rams reached the NFL title game in both seasons, dropping a heartbreaking last-minute decision in 1950 before winning the following year's clash, both games coming against the Cleveland Browns.

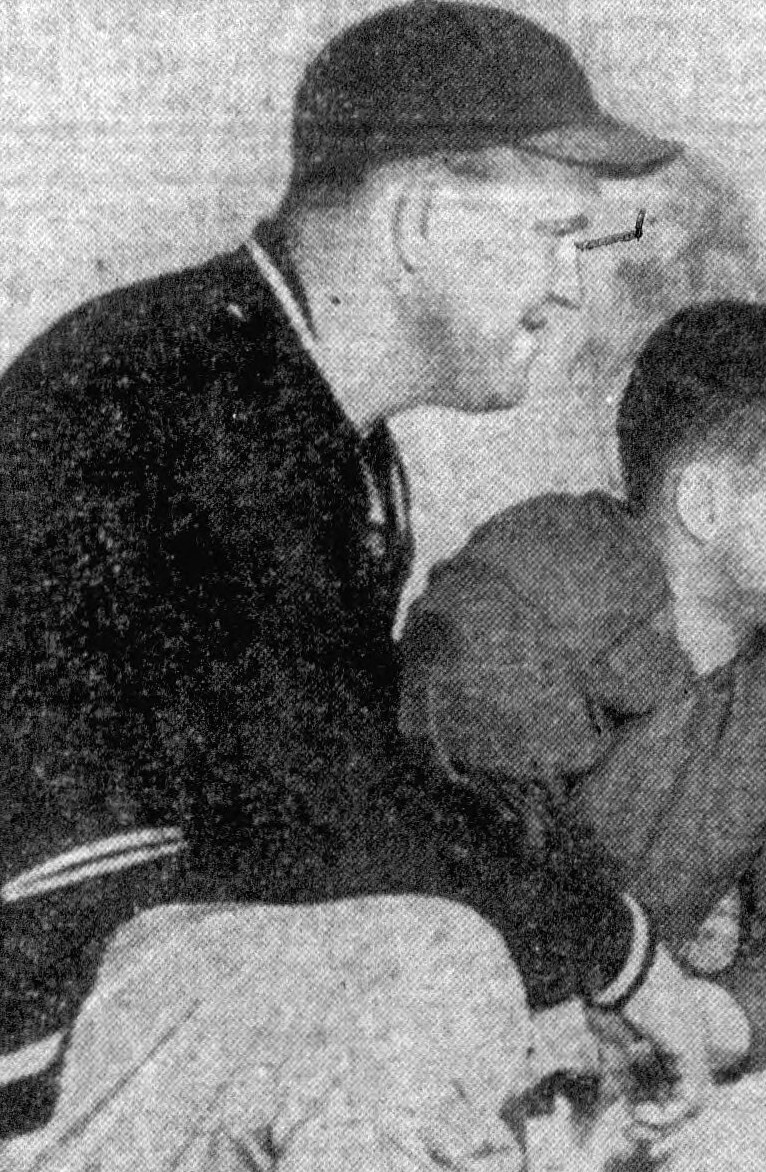
Coach Pool with the Rams in 1951.

However, when the team was pounded 37–7 by the Browns in the 1952 opener, reports of a simmering feud between Stydahar and Pool surfaced. During the offseason, Stydahar had taken away defensive duties from Pool, then attacked the latter's work ethic. The Rams split into factions in support of each coach.

Further controversy developed when Stydahar resigned on September 30, 1952, and Pool took his place. Pool had told media that "under no circumstances" would he accept the job if Stydahar resigned, then changed his mind. The situation mirrored Pool's earlier stints in Miami and Chicago, where he was accused of undermining the head coach before taking over the position.

Ridding itself of the earlier problems, the Rams rebounded to win nine of their final 11 games, with the New York Daily News awarding Pool Coach of the Year honors. For the fourth consecutive year, the team reached the postseason, but unlike the previous year, dropped the divisional playoff game to the Detroit Lions.

In 1953, the Rams again finished 9–3, but endured a number of key injuries and had the misfortune of being in the same conference as the defending champion Lions, factors that kept them out of the playoffs. The next year, the team dropped to 6–6, with Pool spending time defending the team against charges of dirty play, while also battling reports of a revolt among his players. After some team members were severely criticized by Pool, team owner Dan Reeves met privately with a group of players. Reeves stated that he would keep Pool despite the controversy, but after four of the team's five assistant coaches announced they were resigning, Pool quit on December 17, 1954, ending his Rams' head coaching career with a 23–10–2 mark.

Soon after Sid Gillman was hired as Pool's successor, erroneous reports surfaced that Pool would again be a Rams' assistant. Instead, he served as an assistant coach for the next two years in the annual College All-Star Game, and also served his first stint as a scout. On December 27, 1956, he headed north when he was hired as head coach of the Canadian Football League's Toronto Argonauts, earning the biggest coaching contract in league history up to that time.

When Bob Waterfield was named head coach of the Rams in January 1960, he named Pool, who had been running a Toronto travel agency, as an assistant two months later. The two had worked together a decade earlier in fashioning the team's potent offense, and Waterfield had assisted Pool during the latter's 1957 training camp in Toronto.

Despite the chemistry between the two, the Rams managed only a 4–7–1 record, then followed that with a 4–10 mark. During the latter part of the 1961 NFL season, another player revolt against Pool began when complaints about his status and coaching methods surfaced. Ram tackle Frank Varrichione and Joe Marconi charged that Pool was really running the team, comparing him to a slave-driver, and that the team's offense was dated.

When Waterfield was let go midway through the 1962 NFL season, having compiled a 9–24–1 record, Pool and the remainder of the staff finished out the season under interim head coach Harland Svare. When Svare was retained after the season, Pool became a scout for the team.

== Later life ==
Pool later helped start the league's first scouting combine, Quadra, and serve as a talent scout for the next few decades. In 1964, he moved from Southern California to a ranch in the foothills of the Sierra Nevada. He died of congestive heart failure in Mariposa, California.

== Head coaching record ==
=== Service ===
Year	Team	Overall	Conference	Standing	Bowl/playoffs	AP^{#}
**Fort Pierce Amphibs** (Independent) (1944)
1944	Fort Pierce	9–0				18
1945	Fort Pierce	4–9				
Fort Pierce:		13–9				
Total:		13–9				

=== Professional ===
Team	Year	Regular season					Postseason			
Team	Year	Won	Lost	Ties	Win %	Finish	Won	Lost	Win %	Result
MIA	1946	2	6	0	.250	4th in AAFC Eastern	–	–	–	–
MIA total		2	6	0	.250		–	–	–	–
CHI	1947	1	3	0	.250	4th in AAFC West	–	–	–	–
CHI total		1	3	0	.250		–	–	–	–
AAFC total		3	9	0	.250		–	–	–	–
LA	1952	9	2	0	.818	2nd in NFL National	0	1	.000	**Lost to Detroit Lions in Conference Championship**
LA	1953	8	3	1	.708	3rd in NFL Western	–	–	–	–
LA	1954	6	5	1	.542	4th in NFL Western	–	–	–	–
LA total		23	10	2	.686		0	1	.000	–
NFL total		23	10	2	.686		0	1	.000	–
TOR	1957	4	10	0	.286	4th in IRFU	–	–	–	–
TOR	1958	4	10	0	.286	4th in IRFU	–	–	–	–
TOR	1959	2	5	0	.286	4th in IRFU	–	–	–	–
TOR total		10	25	0	.286		–	–	–	–
CFL total		10	25	0	.286		–	–	–	–
Total		36	44	2	.451		0	1	.000	–

Sporting positions
Preceded by Jim Crowley	Chicago Rockets Head Coaches; 1947	Succeeded by Edward McKeever
