= Aldo Forte =

American football player (1918–2007)

No. 23, 14, 25, 40
- Positions: Guard, Tackle

Personal information
- Born: January 20, 1918; Chicago, Illinois, U.S.
- Died: August 29, 2007 (aged 89); Palm City, Florida, U.S.
- Listed height: 6 ft 0 in (1.83 m)
- Listed weight: 213 lb (97 kg)

Career information
- High school: Fenger Academy (Chicago)
- College: Montana (1935-1938)
- NFL draft: 1939: 21st round, 191st overall pick

Career history

Playing
- Chicago Bears (1939–1941, 1946); Detroit Lions (1946); Green Bay Packers (1947)

Coaching
- Detroit Lions (1950–1965) Offensive line coach

Awards and highlights
- 3× NFL champion (1940, 1941, 1946); 2× NFL All-Star (1940, 1941)

Career NFL statistics
- Games played: 49
- Games started: 12
- Fumble recoveries: 2
- Stats at Pro Football Reference

Aldo John Forte (/ˈfɔːrtiː/ FORT-ee; January 20, 1918 – August 29, 2007) was a guard and an offensive tackle in the National Football League (NFL) who played for the Chicago Bears, Detroit Lions, and the Green Bay Packers. Forte played collegiate ball at the University of Montana before being drafted into the NFL by the Chicago Bears in the 21st round of the 1939 NFL draft. He played professionally for five seasons before retiring in 1947.

After retiring, Forte served as a longtime offensive line coach for the Detroit Lions from 1950 to 1965. He died in Palm City, Florida in 2007.
