= Gary Famiglietti =

American football player (1913–1986)

No. 2, 17
- Positions: Fullback, halfback

Personal information
- Born: November 28, 1913; Medford, Massachusetts, U.S.
- Died: July 13, 1986 (aged 72); Chicago, Illinois, U.S.
- Listed height: 6 ft 0 in (1.83 m)
- Listed weight: 225 lb (102 kg)

Career information
- High school: Medford
- College: Boston University
- NFL draft: 1938: 3rd round, 25th overall pick

Career history
- Chicago Bears (1938–1945); Boston Yanks (1946)

Awards and highlights
- 3× NFL champion (1940, 1941, 1943); Second-team All-Pro (1942); 3× Pro Bowl (1940–1942); NFL rushing touchdowns leader (1942)

Career NFL statistics
- Rushing yards: 1,981
- Rushing average: 3.8
- Receptions: 12
- Receiving yards: 187
- Total touchdowns: 25
- Stats at Pro Football Reference

Gary J. Famiglietti (November 28, 1913 – July 13, 1986) was an American professional football player who played running back for nine seasons for the Chicago Bears and Boston Yanks. He was born in Medford, Massachusetts and attended college at Boston University. He was selected in the third round of the 1938 NFL draft.

Famiglietti's most productive year occurred in 1942. He finished third in the National Football League (NFL) in rushing yards with a total of 503 and first in rushing touchdowns with a total of 8.

== NFL career statistics ==
Legend
	Won the NFL Championship
	Led the league
**Bold**	Career high

=== Regular season ===
Year	Team	Games		Rushing				Receiving			
Year	Team	GP	GS	Att	Yds	Avg	TD	Rec	Yds	Avg	TD
1938	CHI	9	3	33	129	3.9	0	0	0	0.0	0
1939	CHI	10	2	33	128	3.9	0	3	**72**	**24.0**	0
1940	CHI	11	2	93	320	3.4	4	1	11	11.0	0
1941	CHI	7	2	36	101	2.8	1	0	0	0.0	0
1942	CHI	10	8	**118**	**503**	4.3	**8**	1	12	12.0	0
1943	CHI	10	4	64	229	3.6	2	1	10	10.0	0
1944	CHI	10	1	63	282	**4.5**	2	1	23	23.0	**1**
1945	CHI	10	0	65	235	3.6	3	**4**	42	10.5	0
1946	BOS	11	0	23	54	2.3	4	1	17	17.0	0
		88	22	528	1,981	3.8	24	12	187	15.6	1

=== Playoffs ===
Year	Team	Games		Rushing				Receiving			
Year	Team	GP	GS	Att	Yds	Avg	TD	Rec	Yds	Avg	TD
1940	CHI	1	0	4	**20**	**5.0**	**1**	0	0	0.0	0
1941	CHI	1	0	0	0	0.0	0	0	0	0.0	0
1942	CHI	1	1	**8**	15	1.9	0	0	0	0.0	0
1943	CHI	1	0	3	9	3.0	0	0	0	0.0	0
		4	1	15	44	2.9	1	0	0	0.0	0
