= Ken Kavanaugh =

American football player, coach, and scout (1916–2007)

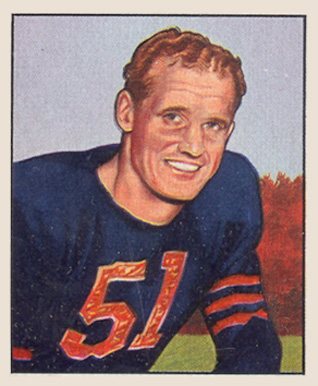
- Kavanaugh's 1950 Bowman football card

No. 51
- Position: End

Personal information
- Born: November 23, 1916; Little Rock, Arkansas, U.S.
- Died: January 25, 2007 (aged 90); Sarasota, Florida, U.S.
- Listed height: 6 ft 3 in (1.91 m)
- Listed weight: 207 lb (94 kg)

Career information
- High school: Little Rock Central
- College: LSU (1937–1939)
- NFL draft: 1940: 3rd round, 22nd overall pick

Career history

Playing
- Chicago Bears (1940–1941; 1945–1950)

Coaching
- Chicago Bears (1951) Ends coach; Boston College (1952–1953) Ends coach; Villanova (1954) Ends coach; New York Giants (1955–1970) Ends / wide receivers coach; New York Giants (1969–1970) Offensive coordinator

Operations
- New York Giants (1971–1979) Pro scout

Awards and highlights
- 3× NFL champion (1940, 1941, 1946); 2× First-team All-Pro (1946, 1947); 2× Pro Bowl (1940, 1941); 2× NFL receiving touchdowns leader (1947, 1949); NFL 1940s All-Decade Team; 100 greatest Bears of All-Time; PRFA Hall of Very Good (2009); SEC Player of the Year (1939); Consensus All-American (1939); 2× First-team All-SEC (1938, 1939)

Career NFL statistics
- Receptions: 162
- Receiving yards: 3,626
- Receiving touchdowns: 50
- Military career
- Allegiance: United States
- Branch: U.S. Air Force
- Service years: 1942–1944
- Rank: Captain
- Unit: Eighth Air Force
- Conflicts: World War II
- Awards: Air Medal (4 OLC); Distinguished Flying Cross
- Stats at Pro Football Reference
- Coaching profile at Pro Football Reference
- College Football Hall of Fame

Kenneth William Kavanaugh (November 23, 1916 – January 25, 2007) was an American professional football player, coach, and scout. He played professionally in the National Football League (NFL) for the Chicago Bears as an end from 1940 to 1950, except for three seasons during which he served in World War II. He led the league in receiving touchdowns twice and is a member of the NFL 1940s All-Decade Team. He is the Bears' all-time leader in receiving touchdowns, with 50. He retired with the second-most receiving touchdowns in NFL history and was the second to reach 50 touchdowns in NFL history.

Kavanaugh played college football at Louisiana State University for the LSU Tigers, where he was named most valuable player of the Southeastern Conference and a consensus All-American in 1939 after leading the nation in receptions and receiving yards. He was elected to the College Football Hall of Fame in 1963.

== Early life and college ==
Kavanaugh was born in Little Rock, Arkansas. He graduated from Little Rock Central High School in 1936.

Kavanaugh arrived at Louisiana State University in Baton Rouge, Louisiana in 1936 and joined the LSU football varsity team in 1937. As an end, he was quickly able to fill the void in the offense left by the departure of two-time All-American Gaynell Tinsley. At 6 feet 3 inches (1.91 m), Kavanaugh was a large receiver for his time, and used his size to outreach defenders. Bernie Moore, Kavanaugh's head coach at LSU, said Kavanaugh "was a pass completer rather than a receiver, simply because he'd catch passes no one else could get to." He was named to the Associated Press (AP) All-Southeastern Conference (SEC) second alternate team after the 1937 season. In 1938, the AP named him a first-team All-SEC selection, and he was a second-team selection by the United Press.

In 1939, in a game against Holy Cross, Kavanaugh caught four touchdown passes in the 26–7 win. According to Kavanaugh and teammate Young Bussey, Kavanaugh found four rusty nails on the sideline during the game. The next week against Rice, he found another nail and scored another touchdown to give LSU a 7–0 win. The pattern continued against Loyola and Vanderbilt, as Kavanaugh found two nails before each game and in each scored two touchdowns. A sportswriter for the Baton Rouge Advocate claimed he saw coach Bernie Moore at a local store stocking up on nails before LSU's game against No. 1 Tennessee. Kavanaugh failed to score in the game, however, as the Tigers lost 20–0.

The Nashville Banner named Kavanaugh co-MVP of the Southeastern Conference for 1939 along with Bob Foxx of Tennessee. Kavanaugh was a consensus All-America selection for the 1939 All-America Team, being named to the team by five of the nine official selectors. He was also awarded the Knute Rockne Memorial Trophy by the Washington D.C. Touchdown Club as the nation's Lineman of the Year and finished seventh in Heisman Trophy balloting.

== Professional ==
=== Pre-war ===
After college, Kavanaugh signed a minor league baseball contract with the St. Louis Cardinals organization for $300 a month. He later signed with the NFL's Chicago Bears after striking a deal with Bears owner George Halas for $300 a game. He played for the Bears during a period in which they were nicknamed the Monsters of the Midway. In the 1940 NFL Championship Game, the Bears defeated the Washington Redskins 73–0, the most lopsided victory in NFL history. Kavanaugh caught the game's only touchdown pass, a 30-yard reception from quarterback Sid Luckman shortly before halftime. The next season, the Bears won the 1941 NFL Championship Game, as they defeated the New York Giants 39–7 and repeated as NFL champions. The final score in the game was a fumble recovery by Kavanaugh on defense, returning the ball 42 yards for a touchdown. In his first two seasons with the Bears, Kavanaugh compiled 23 receptions for 590 yards and nine touchdowns.

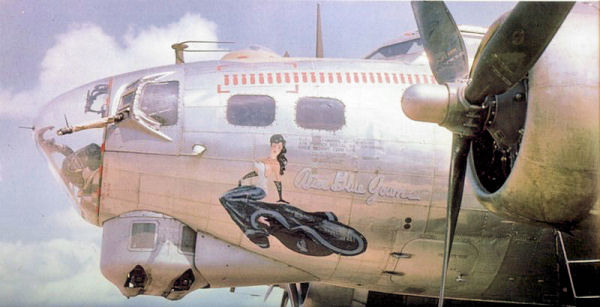
Boeing B-17G Alice Blue Gown of the 851st Bomb Squadron

=== World War II ===
Kavanaugh's career was interrupted by World War II, during which he was a pilot in the European theater. He was a member of the Eighth Air Force's 490th Bombardment Group and 851st Bombardment Squadron and attained the rank of captain. He flew 30 missions and was awarded the Distinguished Flying Cross and the Air Medal with four oak leaf clusters. Former LSU and Bears teammate Young Bussey was the Bears' only casualty in the war.

=== Post-war ===
After the war, he continued his career with the Bears. In 1945 he had 543 yards and six touchdowns, and in 1946 had 337 yards and five touchdowns. Three of his touchdowns in 1946 came in a 27–21 win over the Los Angeles Rams in week seven. The Bears defeated the New York Giants 24–14 in the 1946 NFL Championship Game, which gave Kavanaugh his third league championship with the team. The first touchdown of the game was a 21-yard pass from Luckman to Kavanaugh. After the season, he was named to the United Press All-NFL first-team. Kavanaugh had his most productive season statistically in 1947. He had career highs with 32 receptions, 881 yards, and 13 touchdowns. He set a Bears record by recording a receiving touchdown in seven straight games, a streak that began with a three-touchdown game against the Boston Yanks in week six. His 13 receiving touchdowns led the league, and he earned his second straight first-team All-NFL selection from the United Press.

Kavanaugh was named to his third straight All-NFL first-team in 1948, and he again led the league in receiving touchdowns in 1949, with nine. His most productive single-game yardage performance came in his final season, in 1950 against the Yanks, as he caught eight passes for 177 yards and a touchdown.

Kavanaugh spent a total of eight seasons in Chicago. He spent the majority of his career catching passes from quarterbacks Sid Luckman and Johnny Lujack. He remains the Bears' career leader in touchdown receptions, with 50. He also holds franchise records for highest career and single-season yards-per-reception. His 13 touchdown receptions in 1947 is a single-season Bears record he shares with Dick Gordon, who tied it in 1970.

In 1969, Kavanaugh was voted by sportswriters to the NFL 1940s All-Decade Team. The Professional Football Researchers Association named Kavanaugh to the PRFA Hall of Very Good Class of 2009.

== Coaching career and later life ==
After he retired from playing, he remained with the Bears for the 1951 season as an ends coach. He was hired by Boston College in 1952 to serve in the same position, until his resignation in 1954. After serving as an assistant at Villanova in 1954, Kavanaugh was hired by the New York Giants in 1955 as ends coach and continued in that position until 1970. He was the Giants’ offensive coordinator from 1969-70. He became a scout for the Giants in 1971, serving until he retired from football in 1999.

His son, Ken Kavanaugh Jr. played at LSU as a tight end. He was drafted by the Giants in the 1972 NFL draft but did not play professionally.

Kavanaugh died of complications from pneumonia on January 25, 2007, in Sarasota, Florida.

== NFL career statistics ==
Legend
	Won the NFL championship
	Led the league
**Bold**	Career high

=== Regular season ===
Year	Team	Games		Receiving				
Year	Team	GP	GS	Rec	Yds	Avg	Lng	TD
1940	CHI	11	0	12	276	23.0	74	3
1941	CHI	11	0	11	314	**28.5**	48	6
1945	CHI	10	2	25	543	21.7	64	6
1946	CHI	10	4	18	337	18.7	38	5
1947	CHI	**12**	6	**32**	**818**	25.6	**81**	**13**
1948	CHI	**12**	7	18	352	19.6	64	6
1949	CHI	**12**	**10**	29	655	22.6	**81**	9
1950	CHI	**12**	7	17	331	19.5	67	2
Career		90	36	162	3,626	22.4	81	50

== See also ==
- List of National Football League annual receiving touchdowns leaders
- List of NCAA major college football yearly receiving leaders
