= Bob Nowaskey =

American football player (1918–1971)

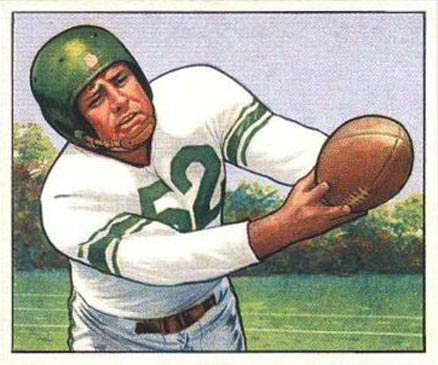
- Nowaskey on a 1950 Bowman football card

No. 20, 55, 52
- Position: End

Personal information
- Born: February 3, 1918; Everson, Pennsylvania, U.S.
- Died: March 21, 1971 (aged 53); Arlington Heights, Illinois, U.S.
- Listed height: 6 ft 0 in (1.83 m)
- Listed weight: 205 lb (93 kg)

Career information
- High school: Scottsdale (PA)
- College: George Washington (1936-1939)
- NFL draft: 1940: 7th round, 55th overall pick

Career history

Playing
- Chicago Bears (1940–1942); Los Angeles Dons (1946-1948); Baltimore Colts (1948–1950)

Coaching
- Chicago Cardinals (1954–1957) Ends coach

Awards and highlights
- 2× NFL champion (1940, 1941); 2× Pro Bowl (1940, 1941); Third-team All-American (1939); Second-team All-Eastern (1939)

Career NFL/AAFC statistics
- Receptions: 51
- Receiving yards: 767
- Receiving touchdowns: 6
- Stats at Pro Football Reference

Robert John Nowaskey (February 3, 1918 – March 21, 1971) was an American professional football end, born in Everett, Pennsylvania, who played eight seasons in the All-America Football Conference (AAFC) and in the National Football League (NFL). He was selected in the seventh round of the 1940 NFL draft.

== Personal life ==
Nowaskey was of Polish descent.
