= John Siegal =

American football player (1918–2015)

No. 19, 6
- Position: End

Personal information
- Born: May 15, 1918; Larksville, Pennsylvania, U.S.
- Died: May 27, 2015 (aged 97); Harveys Lake, Pennsylvania, U.S.
- Listed height: 6 ft 1 in (1.85 m)
- Listed weight: 203 lb (92 kg)

Career information
- High school: Larksville
- College: Columbia (1935-1938)
- NFL draft: 1939: 17th round, 155th overall pick

Career history
- Chicago Bears (1939–1943)

Awards and highlights
- 3× NFL champion (1940, 1941, 1943); 3× Pro Bowl (1940, 1941, 1942)

Career NFL statistics
- Receptions: 31
- Receiving yards: 637
- Touchdowns: 6
- Stats at Pro Football Reference

John Walter Siegal (May 15, 1918 – May 27, 2015) was an American professional football end/defensive end in the National Football League. He was drafted in the 17th round of the 1939 NFL Draft. He played five seasons for the Chicago Bears (1939–1943). He was born in Larksville, Pennsylvania. At the time of his death, Siegal was the oldest living Bears player. He died on May 27, 2015, at the age of 97 in his hometown of Harveys Lake, Pennsylvania.
