= Ray Bray =

American football player (1917–1996)

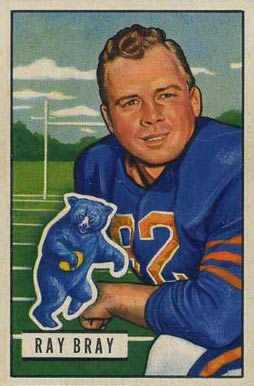
- Bray on a 1951 Bowman football card

No. 82, 63
- Positions: Guard, defensive end

Personal information
- Born: February 1, 1917; Vulcan, Michigan, U.S.
- Died: December 26, 1993 (aged 76); Mesa, Arizona, U.S.
- Listed height: 6 ft 0 in (1.83 m)
- Listed weight: 237 lb (108 kg)

Career information
- High school: Norway-Vulcan
- College: Western Michigan
- NFL draft: 1939: 9th round, 76th overall pick

Career history
- Chicago Bears (1939–1942, 1946–1951); Green Bay Packers (1952)

Awards and highlights
- 3× NFL champion (1940-1941, 1946); 2× Second-team All-Pro (1949-1950); 4× Pro Bowl (1940-1941, 1950-1951); 100 greatest Bears of All-Time; Helms Athletic Foundation Hall of Fame (1959)

Career NFL statistics
- Games played: 121
- Games started: 88
- Fumble recoveries: 7
- Stats at Pro Football Reference

Raymond Robert Bray (February 1, 1917 – December 26, 1993) was an American professional football player who was an offensive guard and defensive lineman for 11 seasons in the National Football League (NFL). He served in the U.S. Navy from 1943 to 1945.

== Biography ==
Ray Bray was born February 1, 1917, in Caspian, Michigan.

His football career began at Western State Normal School (now known as Western Michigan University) where he played football from 1936 to 1938. He was selected in the ninth round of the 1939 NFL draft.

Bray was selected in the 9th round of the 1939 NFL draft by the Chicago Bears, who made him the 76th overall selection.

As a player, during the off-season he operated a used car lot on Chicago's side.

Bray died December 26, 1993, in Mesa, Arizona.
