= Dick Plasman =

American football player (1914–1981)

No. 14, 16
- Positions: End, Defensive tackle

Personal information
- Born: April 6, 1914; Miami, Florida, U.S.
- Died: June 20, 1981 (aged 67); Naples, Florida, U.S.
- Listed height: 6 ft 3 in (1.91 m)
- Listed weight: 218 lb (99 kg)

Career information
- High school: Miami
- College: Vanderbilt (1933-1936)
- NFL draft: 1937: 3rd round, 28th overall pick

Career history

Playing
- Chicago Bears (1937–1941, 1944); Chicago Cardinals (1946–1947)

Coaching
- Chicago Cardinals (1947-1949) Assistant coach; Green Bay Packers (1950) Ends coach; Green Bay Packers (1951–1952) Assistant coach; Pittsburgh Steelers (1958) Line coach; Pittsburgh Steelers (1959–1961) Assistant coach

Awards and highlights
- 3× NFL champion (1940, 1941, 1947); 2× First-team All-Pro (1939, 1941); 2× NFL All-Star (1940, 1941); First-team All-SEC (1936)

Career NFL statistics
- Receptions: 56
- Receiving yards: 1,083
- Receiving touchdowns: 7
- Stats at Pro Football Reference

Herbert Gustave "Dick" Plasman (April 6, 1914 – June 20, 1981) was an American professional football player who played running back for eight seasons for the Chicago Bears and Chicago Cardinals. He is notably the last player in the National Football League (NFL) to play a game without a helmet.

Plasman was selected by the Bears in the third round of the 1937 NFL draft. On November 6, 1938, he crashed into Wrigley Field's brick wall during a home game against the Green Bay Packers, suffering a severe scalp laceration, three fractured ribs, a broken wrist, and a fractured arm. There were concerns about him ever playing again due to the wrist and arm injuries. However, he recovered and continued to not wear a helmet—as he did in the 1940 NFL Championship game on December 8, 1940, and Chicago's 1941 NFL Championship game victory on December 21, 1941, two weeks after the bombing of Pearl Harbor. Plasman entered the Air Force in July 1942 and thus missed the 1942 and 1943 seasons, but returned for the 1944 season—when he was forced to wear a helmet due to the new NFL helmet rule.

"Ferocious on his blocks, a great pass rusher and a receiver, too. The guy was terrific, a force out there. He was worthy of the Hall of Fame".

— Paul (Dr. Z) Zimmerman
