= 1942 All-Pro Team =

Official list of the best NFL players in 1942

The 1942 All-Pro Team consisted of American football players who were chosen by various selectors for the All-Pro team for the 1942 football season. Teams were selected by, among others, the "official" All-Pro team announced by the NFL and selected by a committee of nine reporters (NFL), the Associated Press (AP), the International News Service (INS), and the New York Daily News (NYDN).

== Selections ==
Position	Player	Team	Selector(s)
Quarterback	Sid Luckman	Chicago Bears	NFL-1, AP-1, INS-1, NYDN-1
Quarterback	Sammy Baugh	Washington Redskins	AP-1, INS-1 [halfback], NYDN-1
Quarterback	Cecil Isbell	Green Bay Packers	AP-2, NFL-1, NYDN-1
Halfback	Bill Dudley	Pittsburgh Steelers	NFL-1, AP-1, INS-1, NYDN-1
Fullback	Gary Famiglietti	Chicago Bears	NFL-1, INS-1
Fullback	Andy Farkas	Washington Redskins	AP-1
End	Don Hutson	Green Bay Packers	NFL-1, AP-1, INS-1, NYDN-1
End	Bob Masterson	Washington Redskins	NFL-1
End	George Wilson	Chicago Bears	AP-1, NYDN-1
End	Ed Cifers	Washington Redskins	INS-1
Tackle	Willie Wilkin	Washington Redskins	NFL-1, AP-1, NYDN-1
Tackle	Lee Artoe	Chicago Bears	NFL-1, AP-1, NYDN-1
Tackle	Ed Kolman	Chicago Bears	INS-1
Tackle	Bruiser Kinard	Brooklyn Dodgers	INS-1
Guard	Dan Fortmann	Chicago Bears	NFL-1, AP-1, INS-1, NYDN-1
Guard	Monk Edwards	New York Giants	NFL-1, INS-1
Guard	Riley Matheson	Cleveland Rams	AP-1
Guard	Milt Simington	Pittsburgh Steelers	NYDN-1
Center	Bulldog Turner	Chicago Bears	NFL-1, AP-1, INS-1, NYDN-1
