= Bob Swisher =

American football player (1914–1979)

No. 48
- Position: Halfback

Personal information
- Born: July 14, 1914; Victoria, Illinois, U.S.
- Died: September 27, 1979 (aged 65); Memphis, Tennessee, U.S.
- Listed height: 5 ft 11 in (1.80 m)
- Listed weight: 163 lb (74 kg)

Career information
- High school: Peoria (IL) Central
- College: Northwestern

Career history
- Chicago Bears (1938–1941, 1945)

Awards and highlights
- 2× NFL champion (1940, 1941)

Career statistics
- Games played: 41
- Starts: 8
- Yards rushing: 544 (5.2 average)
- Yards receiving: 582 (26.5 average)
- Touchdowns: 6
- Interceptions: 2
- Stats at Pro Football Reference

Robert Emerson Swisher (July 14, 1914 – September 27, 1979) was an American professional football player who was a running back for five seasons for the Chicago Bears.

He was born in 1914 in Victoria, Illinois. By 1931 he was at Central High School in Peoria, where he participated in football, basketball, and track; his pole vault remained the record at Central until 1970. He then played football and track at Evanston's Northwestern University.

After his time in the NFL, he coached at Loyola University of Los Angeles and the Naval Air Station in Millington, Tennessee.

He died in 1979.
