= Ed Kolman =

American football player (1915–1985)

No. 29, 72
- Position: Offensive tackle

Personal information
- Born: October 21, 1915; Brooklyn, New York, U.S.
- Died: July 31, 1985 (aged 69); New Hyde Park, New York, U.S.
- Listed height: 6 ft 2 in (1.88 m)
- Listed weight: 232 lb (105 kg)

Career information
- High school: Boys (Brooklyn); Stuyvesant (New York, New York)
- College: Temple (1936-1939)
- NFL draft: 1940: 5th round, 37th overall pick

Career history

Playing
- Chicago Bears (1940–1942, 1946–1947); New York Giants (1949)

Coaching
- New York Giants (1950–1966) Line coach; Westchester Bulls (1967-1968) Co-head coach; Long Island Bulls (1969) Co-head coach

Awards and highlights
- 3× NFL champion (1940, 1941, 1946); Second-team All-Pro (1942); 3× Pro Bowl (1940-1942)

Career NFL statistics
- Games played: 66
- Games started: 33
- Fumble recoveries: 1
- Stats at Pro Football Reference

Edward Victor Kolman (October 21, 1915 – July 31, 1985) was an American professional football player who played offensive tackle for six seasons for the Chicago Bears and New York Giants. He was selected in the fifth round of the 1940 NFL draft.
