= Ray Nolting =

American football player and coach (1913–1995)

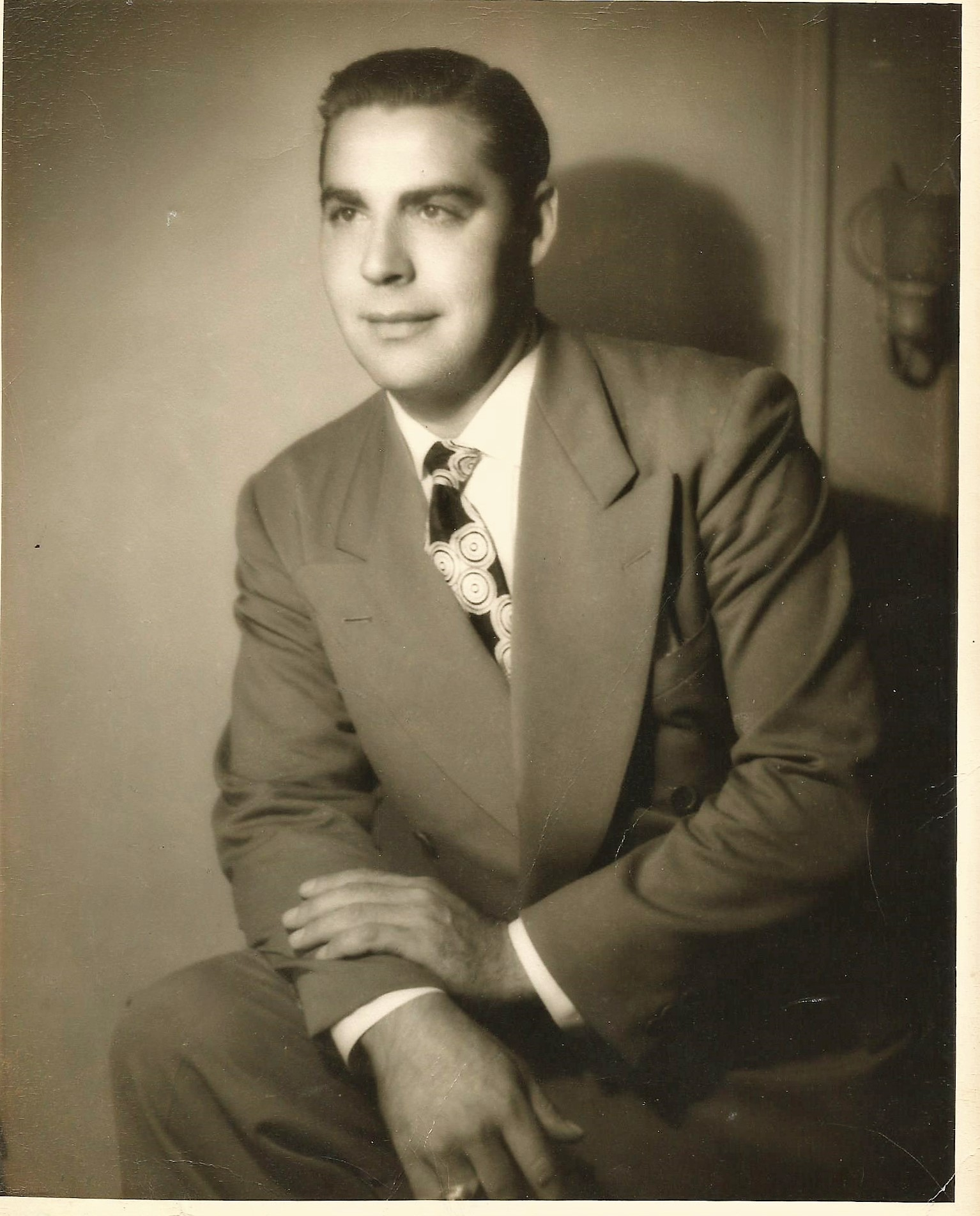

No. 25
- Position: Halfback

Personal information
- Born: November 8, 1913; Cincinnati, Ohio, U.S.
- Died: July 5, 1995 (aged 81); Cincinnati, Ohio, U.S.
- Listed height: 5 ft 11 in (1.80 m)
- Listed weight: 185 lb (84 kg)

Career information
- High school: Hughes (Cincinnati)
- College: Cincinnati (1932-1935)
- NFL draft: 1936: undrafted

Career history

Playing
- Chicago Bears (1936–1943)

Coaching
- Cincinnati (1945–1948) Head coach; New York Bulldogs (1949) Backfield coach; Green Bay Packers (1950) Backfield coach; Indianapolis Warriors (1963) Head coach

Awards and highlights
- 3× NFL champion (1940, 1941, 1943); Second-team All-Pro (1937); 2× Pro Bowl (1940, 1941)

Career NFL statistics
- Rushing yards: 2,285
- Rushing average: 4.5
- Receptions: 30
- Receiving yards: 508
- Total touchdowns: 16
- Stats at Pro Football Reference

Head coaching record
- Career: 23–15–1 (.603)

Raymond Albert Nolting (November 8, 1913 – July 5, 1995) was an American professional football player and coach. He played professionally as a halfback with the Chicago Bears of the National Football League (NFL) from 1936 to 1943. Nolting rushed for over 2,285 yards and had over 508 yards receiving on 30 receptions in eight seasons with the Bears. He was a member of three Bears teams that won the NFL championship, in 1940, 1941 and 1943, and was selected to the Pro Bowl twice. In the 1940 Bears' 73–0 rout of the Washington Redskins, Nolting rushed for 68 yards and a touchdown and intercepted a Sammy Baugh pass. Nolting played college football at the University of Cincinnati.

From 1945 to 1948, he served as the head football coached at his alma mater, compiling a record of 23–15–1. Nolting returned to the in NFL 1949 as backfield coach for the New York Yanks under coach Charley Ewart. 1950, he moved on to the Green Bay Packers, serving in the same position under head coach Gene Ronzani. He resigned from his post with the Packers in January 1951 to take up business in Cincinnati.

Nolting was later a resident of West Chester Township, Butler County, Ohio. He died on July 5, 1995, at Providence Hospital in Cincinnati.

== Head coaching record ==
Year	Team	Overall	Conference	Standing	Bowl/playoffs
Cincinnati Bearcats (Independent) (1945)
1945	Cincinnati	4–4			
Cincinnati Bearcats (Mid-American Conference) (1946–1948)
1946	Cincinnati	9–2	2–0	1st	W Sun
1947	Cincinnati	7–3	3–1	1st	
1948	Cincinnati	3–6–1	3–1	2nd	
Cincinnati:		23–15–1	8–2		
Total:		23–15–1			
