= Joe Maniaci =

American football player and coach (1914–1996)

- Maniaci pictured in The Archive 1949, Saint Louis yearbook

No. 34, 11
- Position: Fullback

Personal information
- Born: January 23, 1914; New York, New York, U.S.
- Died: June 20, 1996 (aged 82); Windsor, Ontario, Canada
- Listed height: 6 ft 1 in (1.85 m)
- Listed weight: 212 lb (96 kg)

Career information
- High school: Hasbrouck Heights (NJ)
- College: Fordham
- NFL draft: 1936: 6th round, 49th overall pick

Career history

Playing
- Brooklyn Dodgers (1936–1938); Chicago Bears (1938–1941)

Coaching
- Bainbridge (1943–1944); Saint Louis (1948–1949)

Awards and highlights
- 2× NFL champion (1940, 1941); 2× Pro Bowl (1940, 1941)

Career NFL statistics
- Rushing yards: 1,855
- Rushing average: 4.6
- Receptions: 16
- Receiving yards: 184
- Total touchdowns: 16
- Stats at Pro Football Reference

Joseph Vincent Maniaci (January 23, 1914 – June 20, 1996) was an American professional football player and coach. He played college football at Fordham University and then in the National Football League (NFL) with the Brooklyn Dodgers and the Chicago Bears. He was selected in the sixth round of the 1936 NFL draft with the 49th overall pick. Maniaci served as the head football coach at Saint Louis University from 1948 to 1949, compiling a record of 6–13–1. The school dropped its varsity football program after the 1949 season.

== Biography ==
Maniaci was featured on the cover of the program for the November 5. 1939, Bears game against the Packers.

Maniaci grew up in Lodi, New Jersey and attended Hasbrouck Heights High School. He served as a lieutenant in the United States Navy during World War II and the Korean War. Maniaci died on June 20, 1996, at his home in Windsor, Ontario.

== Head coaching record ==
Year	Team	Overall	Conference	Standing	Bowl/playoffs	AP^{#}
Bainbridge Commodores (Independent) (1943–1944)
1943	Bainbridge	7–0				17
1944	Bainbridge	10–0				5
Bainbridge:		17–0				
Saint Louis Billikens (Missouri Valley Conference) (1948–1949)
1948	Saint Louis	4–7	0–2	5th		
1949	Saint Louis	2–6–1	0–3–1	7th		
Saint Louis:		6–13–1	0–5–1			
Total:		23–13–1				
^{#}Rankings from final AP Poll.
