= Johnny Hall (American football) =

American football player (1916–1996)

No. 77, 14, 7
- Position: Running back

Personal information
- Born: December 14, 1916; Kaufman, Texas, U.S.
- Died: December 7, 1996 (aged 79); Plano, Texas, U.S.
- Listed height: 6 ft 0 in (1.83 m)
- Listed weight: 196 lb (89 kg)

Career information
- High school: Kaufman
- College: TCU (1935-1938)
- NFL draft: 1939: 9th round, 79th overall pick

Career history
- Chicago Cardinals (1940–1941); Detroit Lions (1942); Chicago Cardinals (1943)

Awards and highlights
- NFL champion (1939); National champion (1938)

Career NFL statistics
- Rushing yards: 296
- Rushing average: 2.5
- Receptions: 28
- Receiving yards: 537
- Total touchdowns: 10
- Stats at Pro Football Reference

John Robert Hall (December 14, 1916 – December 7, 1996) was an American professional football player who was a running back for four seasons for the Chicago Cardinals and Detroit Lions. He was selected in the ninth round of the 1939 NFL draft. He was born in Kaufman, Texas.
