= Bill Hempel =

American football player (1920–2001)

No. 19
- Position: Tackle

Personal information
- Born: February 10, 1920; Lincoln, Nebraska, U.S.
- Died: January 19, 2001 (aged 80); Fresno, California, U.S.
- Listed height: 6 ft 0 in (1.83 m)
- Listed weight: 235 lb (107 kg)

Career information
- High school: York (IL)
- College: Carroll (WI)

Career history
- Chicago Bears (1942)

Career statistics
- Games played: 8
- Stats at Pro Football Reference

William M. Hempel (February 10, 1920 – January 19, 2001) was a player in the National Football League. He played for the Chicago Bears.
