= Solly Sherman =

American football player (1917–2010)

No. 22
- Position: Quarterback

Personal information
- Born: September 25, 1917; Chicago, Illinois, U.S.
- Died: October 10, 2010 (aged 93); Forest Park, Illinois, U.S.
- Listed height: 6 ft 1 in (1.85 m)
- Listed weight: 190 lb (86 kg)

Career information
- High school: Marshall (Chicago)
- College: Chicago (1935–1938)
- NFL draft: 1939: 18th round, 166th overall pick

Career history
- Chicago Bears (1939–1940)

Awards and highlights
- NFL champion (1940); NFL All-Star (1940)

Career NFL statistics
- Passing attempts: 8
- Passing completions: 3
- Completion percentage: 37.5%
- TD–INT: 1–0
- Passing yards: 58
- Passer rating: 103.1
- Stats at Pro Football Reference

Saul S. Sherman (September 25, 1917 – October 10, 2010) was a professional American football quarterback in the National Football League (NFL). Born in Chicago, Illinois, he played two seasons for the Chicago Bears.

== Football career ==
Sherman played collegiately for the University of Chicago, initially as a halfback, before converting to quarterback his senior year. It was during his time at UChicago that he had learned the T-formation, at the time a novel offensive scheme, from Maroons head coach Clark Shaughnessy. He was drafted in the 18th round of the 1939 NFL Draft. Sherman only played two seasons in the pros before he retired to go fight in World War II, but not before he helped teach the T-formation to his Bears teammate, future Pro Football Hall of Famer Sid Luckman, who would go on to use the T to revolutionize the NFL's passing game and quarterback the Bears to four NFL championships. This remains arguably Sherman's most lasting legacy in pro football.

== Sources ==
- Solly Sherman's obituary
