= Len Akin =

American football player (1916–1987)

No. 27, 75, 31
- Positions: Guard, Linebacker

Personal information
- Born: April 8, 1916; McKinney, Texas, U.S.
- Died: March 5, 1987 (aged 70); Irving, Texas, U.S.
- Listed height: 5 ft 11 in (1.80 m)
- Listed weight: 207 lb (94 kg)

Career information
- High school: Woodrow Wilson (Dallas, Texas)
- College: Baylor (1936-1939)
- NFL draft: 1940: 7th round, 57th overall pick

Career history
- Milwaukee Chiefs (1940–1941); Chicago Bears (1942)

Awards and highlights
- First-team All-SWC (1939)

Career NFL statistics
- Games played: 11
- Games started: 1
- Interceptions: 1
- Stats at Pro Football Reference

Leonard Rosser "Tex" Akin (April 8, 1916 – March 5, 1987) was a guard in the National Football League (NFL). He was drafted in the seventh round of the 1940 NFL draft by the Chicago Bears and later played with the team during the 1942 NFL season. Prior to playing with the Bears he had also played with the Milwaukee Chiefs of the American Football League (AFL).
