= Bob Snyder (American football) =

American football player and coach (1913–2001)

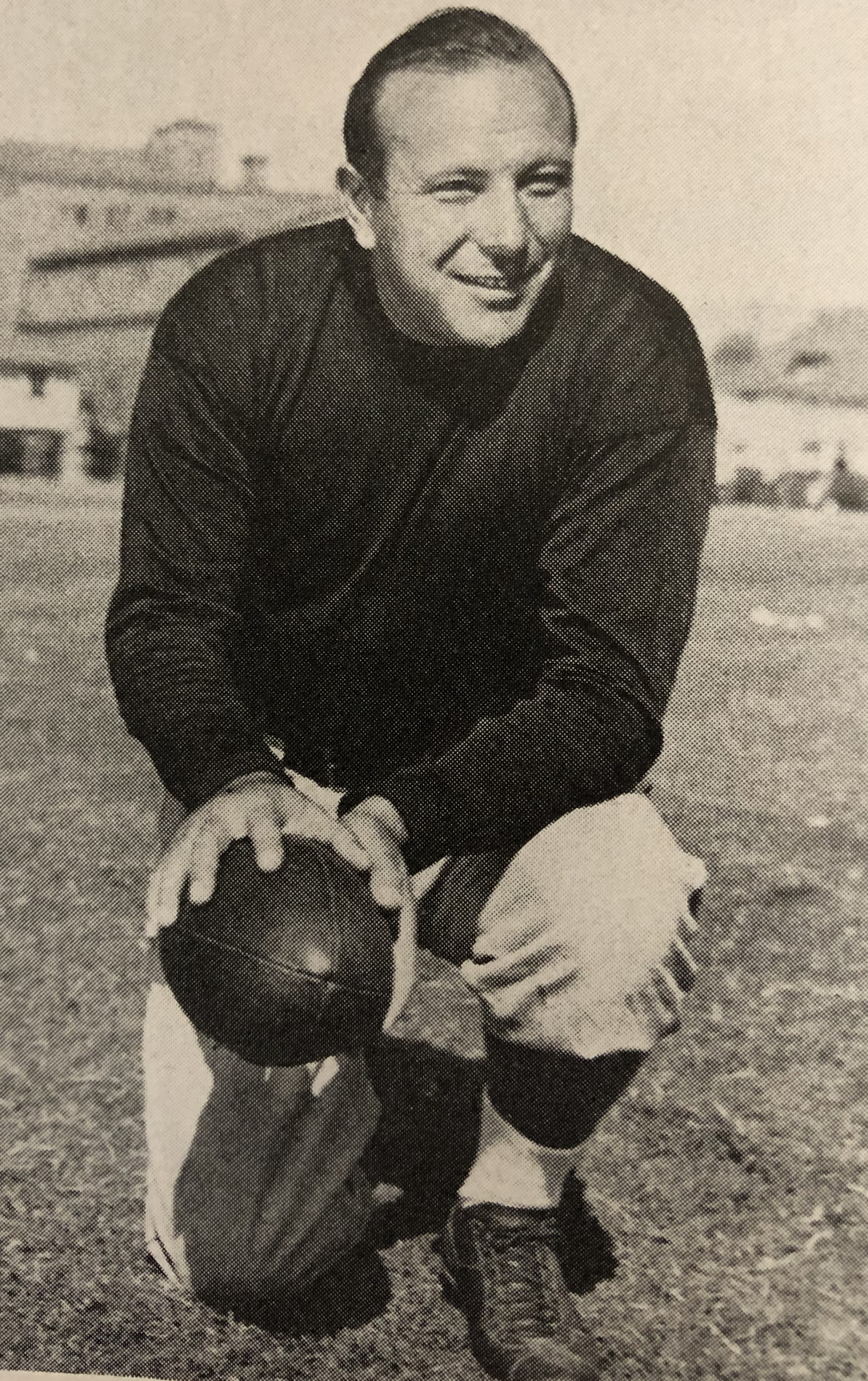
- Snyder at USC c. 1948

No. 4, 1, 17, 13
- Positions: Quarterback, tailback, defensive back, kicker

Personal information
- Born: February 6, 1913; Fremont, Ohio, U.S.
- Died: January 4, 2001 (aged 87); Sylvania, Ohio, U.S.
- Listed height: 6 ft 0 in (1.83 m)
- Listed weight: 200 lb (91 kg)

Career information
- High school: Edward D. Libbey (OH)
- College: Ohio

Career history

Playing
- Pittsburgh Americans (1936); Cleveland Rams (1937–1938); Chicago Bears (1939–1941, 1943)

Coaching
- Notre Dame frosh (1942); Los Angeles Rams (1946) (Assistant coach); Los Angeles Rams (1947); USC (1948) (Assistant coach); Green Bay Packers (1949) (Assistant coach); Toledo (1950); Calgary Stampeders (1953); Villanova (1954) (Assistant coach); Pittsburgh Steelers (1955–1956) (Assistant coach); West Virginia (1957) (Assistant coach); Toledo Tornadoes (1962–1964); Wheeling Ironmen (1965–1967); Indianapolis Capitols (1968)

Awards and highlights
- 3× NFL champion (1940, 1941, 1943); 2× Pro Bowl (1940, 1941)

Head coaching record
- Regular season: 6–6 (.500)
- Coaching profile at Pro Football Reference
- Stats at Pro Football Reference

Robert A. Snyder (February 6, 1913 – January 4, 2001) was an American football player and coach who spent more than three decades in the sport, including his most prominent position as head coach of the National Football League (NFL)'s Los Angeles Rams.

== College career ==
A native of Toledo, Ohio, Snyder played three years of football at Ohio University, seeing action on both sides of the ball. During that trio of seasons that began in 1933, Snyder was off the field for just four minutes, winning small college All-America honors as a senior.

== Professional career ==
He moved on to the fledgling second version of the American Football League in 1936, where he played for the Pittsburgh Americans before shifting to the NFL the following year with the Cleveland Rams. Playing quarterback (as well as serving as the team's placekicker) for two seasons, Snyder finished the 1938 NFL season with 631 yards passing, while also showing excellent speed and mobility.

On February 13, 1939, Snyder was traded to the Chicago Bears and used as running back. After contributing throughout the campaign, he suffered a deep personal tragedy when his two-week-old son, Robert Calvin, died on November 30.

When he returned the next year, Snyder played exclusively at quarterback (and continuing as a kicker), but had the misfortune of playing on the same team as future Hall of Fame signal caller Sid Luckman. That frustration was soothed somewhat when the Bears went on to capture the 1940 NFL Championship with the biggest rout in the league's postseason history, defeating the Washington Redskins, 73–0.

After another season of play resulted in another championship for the Bears, with Snyder kicking three field goals in the 37–9 championship game victory, Snyder retired to become the University of Notre Dame's freshman football coach on July 10, 1942. His main focus was instruction in his area of expertise, the T-Formation, and his work undoubtedly proved to be successful when two quarterbacks under his tutelage, Angelo Bertelli and Johnny Lujack, went on to win the Heisman Trophy.

Snyder returned to the playing field with one more season with the Bears in 1943, notching a trio of league kicking records with 39 conversions, while also connecting on all 12 of his field goal attempts. During the November 14 contest against the New York Giants, Snyder scored on eight conversions during the Bears' high-scoring effort. After the season ended with another Bears' championship, he spent one year contributing to the war effort, serving as personnel manager of the Thompson Aircraft plant in his hometown of Toledo. A back injury suffered during his playing days had prevented Snyder from serving in the armed services. During this stretch, he also coached Libbey High School, his alma mater, to an Ohio state title.

== Coaching career ==
In 1945, Snyder joined the Rams as an assistant coach, and played a major role in helping rookie quarterback Bob Waterfield win Most Valuable Player accolades. Under bitterly cold conditions on December 16, the Rams won the NFL title with a 15–14 decision over the Redskins. Just weeks later, Ram owner Dan Reeves shifted the franchise to Los Angeles, with Snyder spending the following season in the same capacity.

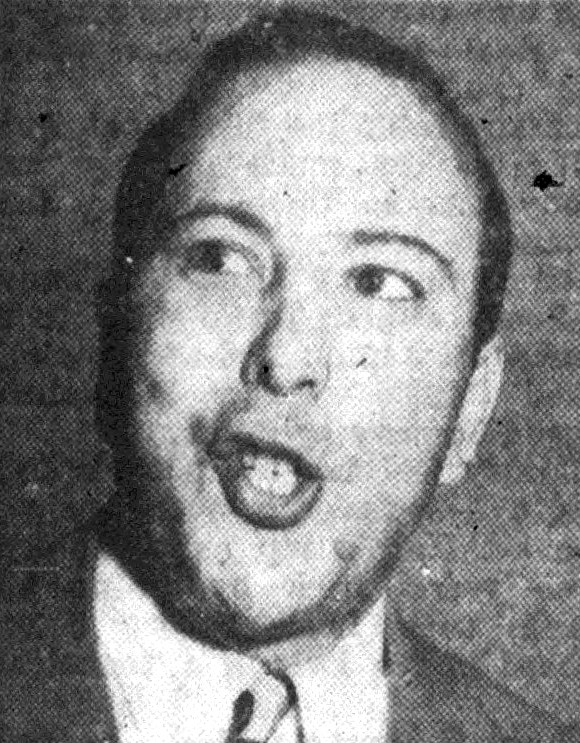
Snyder, circa 1947

After Rams head coach Adam Walsh resigned at the conclusion of the 1946 NFL season, Snyder was named head coach on January 20, 1947, and immediately became the league's youngest head coach. Winning three of the first four games of the regular season, Snyder watched the Rams collapse at midseason with a four-game losing streak to finish with a 6–6 mark. The pressures of that season followed him into the next, causing him to resign on September 3, 1948, citing an ulcer condition.

Despite that stress, Snyder would stay away from coaching for less than a month before accepting an assistant post with the USC Trojans. On January 28, 1949, he left that position for an assistant coaching spot with the Green Bay Packers under Curly Lambeau, but again remained only a year before heading home to become head football coach at the University of Toledo.

Snyder made a bit of history by naming Dick Huston as freshman coach, the first African-American mentor to ever work for a non-black college. Despite being back among family, Snyder left the school after finishing 4–5 during the 1950 season, and did not resurface until 1953 when he was named head coach of the Canadian Football League's Calgary Stampeders.

That foray would again only span one season before he was dismissed. The aftermath of his departure was ugly as Snyder claimed in February 1954 that players were taking the amphetamine benzedrine to keep up their stamina during the season, a charge that was roundly denied by the league. In August of that year, Snyder spent one season as an assistant at Villanova University, then returned to the NFL for two years with the Pittsburgh Steelers before moving back for one year to the college level as a West Virginia University assistant.

Snyder watched his coaching career wind down during the 1960s, working at the minor league football level, beginning with a stint with the Toledo Tornadoes of the United Football League. On September 19, 1965, he was named head coach of the Wheeling Ironmen of the Continental Football League, lasting until his resignation on November 22, 1967. The following year, he became head coach of the league's Indianapolis Capitols, but resigned on February 4, 1969, to enter private business in Toledo.

== Death ==
Snyder died in 2001 at a Toledo rehabilitation center after complications from diabetes.

== Head coaching record ==
=== College ===
Year	Team	Overall	Conference	Standing	Bowl/playoffs
Toledo Rockets (Independent) (1950)
1950	Toledo	4–5			
Toledo:		4–5			
Total:		4–5			

=== Professional ===
Team	Year	Regular season					Postseason			
Team	Year	Won	Lost	Ties	Win %	Finish	Won	Lost	Win %	Result
LA	1947	6	6	0	.500	4th in NFL Western	–	–	–	–
CGY	1953	3	12	1	.219	4th in W.I.F.U.	–	–	–	–
Total		9	18	1	.339		–	–	–	–
