= T formation =

Formation used in American football by the offensive team

A common T formation (the Power-T)

In American football, a T formation (frequently called the full house formation in modern usage, sometimes the Robust T) is a formation used by the offensive team in which three running backs line up in a row about five yards behind the quarterback, forming the shape of a "T".

Numerous variations of the T formation have been developed, including the Power-T, where two tight ends are used, the Pro T, which uses one tight end and one wide receiver, or the Wing T, where one of the running backs (or wingback) lines up one step behind and to the side of the tight end. Any of these can be run using the original spacing, which produced a front of about seven yards, or the Split-T spacing, where the linemen were further apart and the total length of the line was from 10 to 16 yards.

== History ==
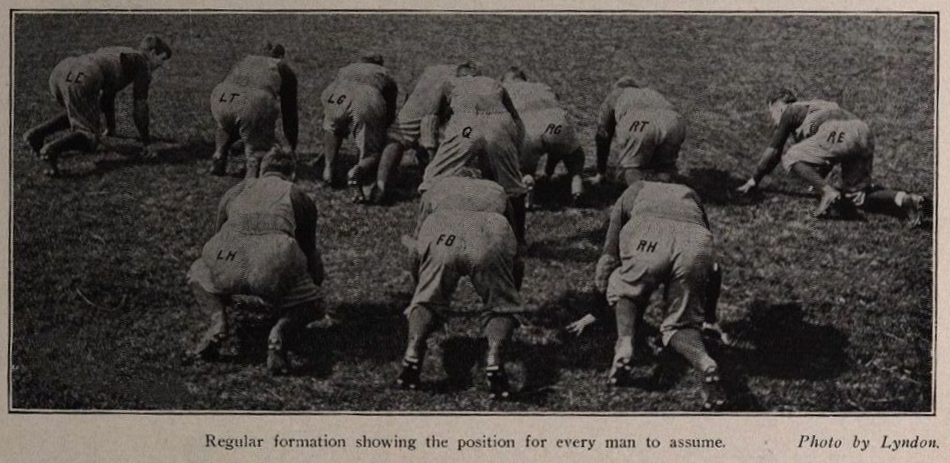
The T formation, described as the "regular formation", in Fielding Yost's 1905 book Football for Player and Spectator

The T formation is often said to be the oldest offensive formation in American football and is claimed to have been invented by Walter Camp in 1882. However, as the forward pass was legalized, the original T became obsolete in favor of formations such as the single wing. Innovations, such as a smaller, more throwing-friendly ball, along with the invention of the hand-to-hand snap in the 1930s, led to the T's revival.

=== Revival ===
The original T formation is rarely used today, but it was successful in the first half of the 20th century. Originally a power running formation with players starting from a stationary position, it was for a time eclipsed by the more open single-wing formation. The T formation experienced a revival in the late 1930s and early 1940s when a man-in-motion began to be utilized, increasing the complexity of the offensive attack.

The formation led to a faster-paced, higher-scoring game. The formation was aided by a rule change before the 1945 season, when the quarterback was no longer required to stand at least 5 yards behind the line of scrimmage. The T formation was made famous by Stanford University under Clark Shaughnessy in 1940, Notre Dame under Frank Leahy; the Fighting Irish won four national titles in the 1940s, and by the University of Oklahoma in the 1950s to win 47 games in a row and three national titles. The formation was also the key weapon of the Chicago Bears, that had used the T formation since the team's inception in 1920, to defeat the Washington Redskins, 73–0, in the 1940 NFL Championship Game and immortalized afterward in their fight song. Shaughnessy helped the Bears prepare for the game against the Redskins. He has been called "The father of the T formation".

==== Shaughnessy and Halas ====
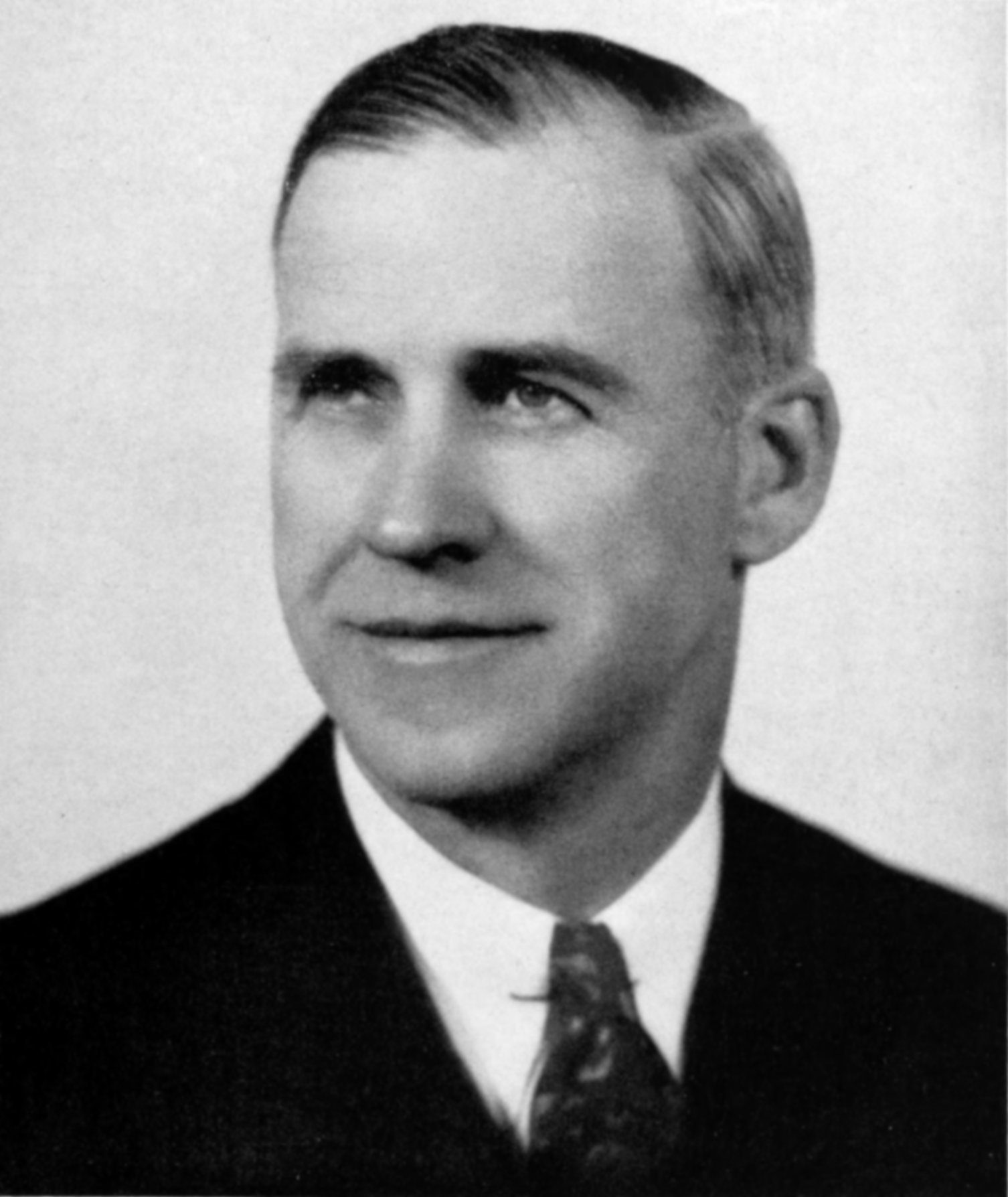
Clark Shaughnessy, the "father of the modern T formation."

The T-formation was viewed as a complicated "gadget" offense by early football coaches. However, NFL owner-coach George Halas and Ralph Jones of the Chicago Bears along with University of Chicago coach Clark Shaughnessy, University of Texas coach Dana X. Bible, and Notre Dame coach Frank Leahy were advocates. Shaughnessy was an advisor to Halas in the 1930s while the head coach at the University of Chicago.

The T-formation became much more viable in 1933 when passing was legalized anywhere behind the line of scrimmage (previously, the passer had to be five yards behind the line). Halas recruited Solly Sherman, the quarterback for the University of Chicago because of his experience with the T-Formation under Clark Shaughnessy. Solly then taught Sid Luckman the system. Sherman, a former halfback, had torn his meniscus in college, and converted to quarterback his senior year when Shaughnessy installed the T-formation at the University of Chicago. He eventually played backup to Sid Luckman with the Bears in 1939 and 1940 and retired so that he could join the war effort. Sid Luckman went on to win four NFL championships in the 1940s. Sid Luckman, in his book Luckman at Quarterback written in 1949, stated that several hundred plays in the Chicago Bears play book gave him over 1,000 options for man-in-motion deceptions, complicated blocking schemes and multiple passing options not previously available. The last team to run the single-wing in the NFL, the Pittsburgh Steelers, converted to the T in 1953. Since that time, the T, and all its variants, have dominated offensive football and created the American football now employed throughout the NCAA and NFL.

The T is referenced in the Chicago Bears fight song, "Bear Down, Chicago Bears", written after the 1940 championship over Washington. "We'll never forget the way you thrilled the nation, with your T formation..."

Additionally, two books detail the development of the T with the Bears. The Chicago Bears by Howard Roberts written in 1947, credits several coaches including Ralph Jones and Clark Shaughnessy for upgrading the T and teaching it to a succession of Bears QBs. The Wow Boys by James W. Johnson written in 2006 tells the story of the Stanford University football season of 1940. The arrival of Shaughnessy and his T offense led to a 10–0 season and a victory in the Rose Bowl over heavily favored University of Nebraska. The Bears' thumping of the Washington Redskins, 73–0, a few weeks earlier caused a sensation. The T swept college and pro football. The brain trust that created the T was always anchored by Coach Halas, who had the savvy for what worked and an eye for the players that fit.

== Modern uses ==
While rarely used today, the key innovations of the T still dominate offensive football. The T was the first offense in which the quarterback took the snap from under center and then either handed off or dropped back to pass. Other offenses up until the 1940s used the quarterback (normally called the "blocking back") primarily as a blocker and the snap usually went to a halfback or tailback. For example, in 1942 and 1943, Hall of Fame passers Sammy Baugh and Sid Luckman both made the Associated Press All-Pro Team - Baugh as a tailback and Luckman as a quarterback. With the T formation, the quarterback under center makes offenses very unpredictable since it is difficult to anticipate the play called based on formation alone. Second, the T allowed running backs to receive the hand-off from the quarterback and hit the "hole" at near full speed. This allowed more complex blocking schemes and gave offenses a temporary, but significant advantage. Other advantages offered by the T were: the ability of the quarterback to fake various handoffs (which led to "option" plays), plays developed much faster than with the single-wing, far fewer double-team blocks were required because the back hit the hole more quickly, the back could choose a different hole than originally planned (due to single-blocking across the line), the center was a more effective blocker since his head was up when he snapped the ball, and backs could be less versatile than required of single-wing backs. The use of the T formation in Canada is slightly different because it is used in 12 man football. Another popular variation is the Shotgun-T because it allows the quarterback to read the defense more effectively. It is very popular in high school football, but rarely used in professional or college football. It is mostly used for sweeps. The T Formation is also being run out of the Pistol.

The T formation is still used in a few instances at the high school level. In Utah, the Duchesne High School team set the state record of 48 consecutive wins using the Wing T. Some smaller colleges and high schools, particularly in the Midwest, especially in Michigan, still use the T. It is also still used on some levels as a goal line formation (often called a "full house" backfield today). Its simplicity, and emphasis on running, makes it particularly popular as a youth football formation.

In 2023, the Jacksonville Jaguars used the T formation during a playoff game against the Los Angeles Chargers, successfully converting a fourth-and-one for 25 yards to set up the game-winning field goal.

== Evolution ==
The Chicago Bears T made great use of "man-in-motion" effectively making one of the three running backs into a receiver as he left the backfield. Thus, the T, originally designed as a more dynamic running offense, became a stronger passing offense than the single-wing, greatly enhancing its appeal. The two-back backfield naturally evolved into the "pro set" with only two running backs in the backfield and a "flanker" permanently posted out in a wide receiver position. Teams initially used a flanker primarily in the "slot" (on the strong side) because the hashmarks were still quite wide, as in college ball. In 1972, the hash marks were moved to their present position, 70 feet, 9 inches from each sideline. This made the strong side / weak side far less of a factor and allowed the opening up of the passing attack. The pro set further evolved into today's complex offenses.

== Prevalence ==
Virtually all modern offensive formations are variations of the T. A notable exception is the Shotgun formation, first used by the San Francisco 49ers in 1959/1960, popularized by the Kansas City Chiefs in the 1960s and the Dallas Cowboys in the 1970s, and now widely used in pro and college football.

The I formation, first popularized in the AFL by the Kansas City Chiefs, circa 1968, is another variation of the T used extensively by high school and, until recently, many college teams. The I is a strong running formation, with the fullback positioned forward with a tailback behind, providing mass at the point of attack. The power I places all three running backs in a line behind the quarterback, making it a powerful running formation, but difficult to pass from. The Chiefs of the late 1960s often sent one of the three backs in motion. The wishbone formation, once dominant in college football, but now virtually extinct, was another T variation, with the fullback positioned very close behind the quarterback, flanked by two halfbacks. This was a strong running formation with the famous triple option where the quarterback could handoff to the fullback, run it himself, or pitch to the trailing halfback. It was run with great success by Darrell Royal's Texas teams, Barry Switzer's Oklahoma teams, Woody Hayes' Ohio State teams, and Paul "Bear" Bryant's teams of the 1970s. This formation required a talented, running quarterback. It fell out of favor because well-coached, physical defenses can stop the option and the wishbone is a poor passing formation.

== See also ==
- Notre Dame Box
- Split-T

== Bibliography ==
- Bible, Dana X., Championship Football, Prentice-Hall, 1947.
- Daly, Dan, National Forgotten League, University of Nebraska Press, 2012.
- Faurot, Dan, Secrets of the "Split T" Formation, Prentice-Hall, 1950.
- Smith, Chester L. (August 20, 1941). "T Formation Was Used By Stagg in '90s". Pittsburgh Press. p. 21.
- Yost, Fielding Harris, Football for Player and Spectator, University Publishing Company, 1905.
