= 1941 NFL season =

American football season

- Inaugural NFL press manual

Regular season
- Duration: September 7 to December 7, 1941
- East Champions: New York Giants
- West Champions: Chicago Bears (playoff)

Championship Game
- Champions: Chicago Bears

NFL teams: West, East

The 1941 NFL season was the 22nd regular season of the National Football League (NFL). The league's ten teams each played a regular season schedule of 11 games, for a total of 55 regular season contests. The total attendance for these games was 1,118,616 — an average of 20,338 fans per event. This represented an increase of 9% over the previous season's attendance.

The defending league champion Chicago Bears and the Green Bay Packers finished the regular season tied in the Western Division, forcing the first divisional playoff game in league history. The Bears won this contest 33–14 at Wrigley Field on December 14, before swamping the New York Giants 37–9 in the 1941 NFL Championship Game at Wrigley Field one week later.

The Bears, who averaged 36 points per game over the course of the 1941 season, became the first team since the institution of the East–West play-off in 1933 to repeat as champion.

== Preseason ==
Before the season, Elmer Layden was named the first Commissioner of the NFL, while Carl Storck resigned as league president. Layden also took on the duties of president and signed a five-year contract at $20,000 annually.

== Draft ==
The 1941 NFL draft was held on December 10, 1940, at Washington, D.C.'s Willard Hotel. With the first pick, the Chicago Bears selected halfback Tom Harmon from The University of Michigan.

== Major changes for 1941 ==
=== Rules changes ===
The league bylaws were changed to provide for playoffs in cases where division races are tied after the regular season, and rules for sudden-death overtimes in case a playoff game was tied after four quarters.

- The penalty for illegal shift is 5 yards.
- The penalty for illegal kick or bat is 15 yards.
- Whenever a player is ejected from the game, his team is penalized 15 yards.
- A personal foul committed by the opponent of the scoring team is enforced on the ensuing kickoff.

In addition to these rule changes, this season marked the first time that the league commissioner became involved in enforcement of player conduct standards. Commissioner Elmer Layden in August assessed $25 fines on Green Bay Packers quarterback Larry Craig and New York Giants halfback Hank Soar for fighting.

Wilson became the official game ball of the NFL.

=== Coaching changes ===
- Detroit Lions: George Clark was replaced by Bill Edwards.
- Pittsburgh Steelers: Walt Kiesling was replaced by Bert Bell, who had sold his ownership stake in the Eagles and then bought a share of the Steelers. Bell resigned as head coach after losing the first two games. Aldo Donelli did not fare any better, losing the next five before being fired. Kiesling then returned for the final four games.
- Philadelphia Eagles: Bert Bell, who left the Eagles to join the Steelers, was replaced by Greasy Neale.

=== Stadium changes ===
- The Detroit Lions played full time at Briggs Stadium (Tiger Stadium), no longer holding home games at University of Detroit Stadium
- The Philadelphia Eagles moved back from Shibe Park to the larger Philadelphia Municipal Stadium, where they previously played from 1936 to 1940

== Division races ==
In the Eastern Division, the Redskins held a half-game after nine weeks of play: at 5–1–0, their only loss had been 17–10 to the 5–2-0 Giants, who had lost two games in a row. Washington, however, lost its next three games, while the Giants rebounded to win their next two games. On November 23, the 5–3 Redskins met the 7–2 Giants at the Polo Grounds, and the Giants' 20–13 win clinched the Division championship.

The Western Division race was one between the Bears and Packers. By November 2, when the teams met at Wrigley Field, the Bears were 5–0 and the Packers 6–1, in part because of the Bears' earlier 25–17 win at Green Bay. Green Bay's 16–14 win put them in the lead, and they finished the regular season at 10–1 on November 30 with a 22–17 comeback win at Washington. On the afternoon of December 7, 1941, on the day Japanese planes bombed Pearl Harbor, the Bears were losing to the Cardinals, 0–14, and trailed 24–20 in the fourth quarter before rallying for a 34–24 win. With both the Bears & Packers finishing at 10–1, a playoff was set to determine who would go to, and host, the Championship Game. They met at Wrigley Field on December 14, with Chicago winning 33–14.

== Final standings ==
NFL Eastern Division
| | W | L | T | PCT | DIV | PF | PA | STK |
|---|---|---|---|---|---|---|---|---|
| New York Giants | 8 | 3 | 0 | .727 | 6–2 | 238 | 114 | L1 |
| Brooklyn Dodgers | 7 | 4 | 0 | .636 | 6–2 | 158 | 127 | W2 |
| Washington Redskins | 6 | 5 | 0 | .545 | 5–3 | 176 | 174 | W1 |
| Philadelphia Eagles | 2 | 8 | 1 | .200 | 1–6–1 | 119 | 218 | L3 |
| Pittsburgh Steelers | 1 | 9 | 1 | .100 | 1–6–1 | 103 | 276 | L2 |

Note: Tie games were not officially counted in the standings until 1972.

NFL Western Division
| | W | L | T | PCT | DIV | PF | PA | STK |
|---|---|---|---|---|---|---|---|---|
| Chicago Bears | 10 | 1 | 0 | .909 | 7–1 | 396 | 147 | W5 |
| Green Bay Packers | 10 | 1 | 0 | .909 | 7–1 | 258 | 120 | W8 |
| Detroit Lions | 4 | 6 | 1 | .400 | 3–4–1 | 121 | 195 | W1 |
| Chicago Cardinals | 3 | 7 | 1 | .300 | 1–6–1 | 127 | 197 | L2 |
| Cleveland Rams | 2 | 9 | 0 | .182 | 1–7 | 116 | 244 | L9 |

Note: Tie games were not officially counted in the standings until 1972.

== Playoffs ==
Western Division Playoff Game

- CHI. BEARS 33, Green Bay 14

NFL Championship Game

- CHI. BEARS 37, N.Y. Giants 9

Home team in capitals

== Team statistics ==
The following statistics cover the 11 regular season games only, exclusive of playoff games. The Chicago Bears, unleashing a juggernaut around their novel T-formation with motion offense, smashed numerous league records for the year, including total yards gained (4,265), passing yards (2,002), single-game total yards (613) and passing yards (376), first downs (181), touchdowns (56), rushing touchdowns (37) — as well as continuing to be the most flagged team in football, setting a new record in penalty yards (officially 676.5).

| Rank | Team | Total yards | (Rushing) | (Passing) | Penalized | Yards allowed | Takeaways | Turnovers |
|---|---|---|---|---|---|---|---|---|
| 1 | Chicago Bears | 4,265 | 2,263 | 2,002 | 677 | 2,539 | 48 | 30 |
| 2 | Green Bay Packers | 3,294 | 1,563 | 1,731 | 509 | 2,564 | 48 | 24 |
| 3 | Brooklyn Dodgers | 2,886 | 1,755 | 1,131 | 371 | 2,379 | 28 | 28 |
| 4 | Chicago Cardinals | 2,756 | 1,097 | 1,659 | 446 | 2,639 | 31 | 32 |
| 5 | Washington Redskins | 2,675 | 1,112 | 1,563 | 402 | 2,448 | 35 | 41 |
| 6 | New York Giants | 2,378 | 1,290 | 1,088 | 323 | 2,378 | 42 | 26 |
| 7 | Philadelphia Eagles | 2,313 | 950 | 1,363 | 407 | 2,887 | 31 | 40 |
| 8 | Cleveland Rams | 2,286 | 968 | 1,352 | 265 | 2,978 | 26 | 43 |
| 9 | Pittsburgh Steelers | 1,871 | 1,217 | 654 | 363 | 2,724 | 36 | 49 |
| 10 | Detroit Lions | 1,843 | 989 | 854 | 455 | 3,021 | 30 | 31 |
Source: Strickler (ed.), 1942 NFL Record & Roster Manual, pp. 94-95. "Takeaways" = (Interceptions + Fumble recoveries)

== Individual leaders ==
=== Rushing ===
Brooklyn fullback Pug Manders topped NFL ground-gainers in 1941.

Although it was the brother of a Chicago Bear — Pug Manders of the Brooklyn Dodgers — that led the league in rushing, three of the top ten ball-carriers in 1941 hailed from George S. Halas' team. No runner in the league cracked the 500 yard mark for the year.

| Rank | Name | Team | Yards rushing | Attempts | Long gain | Yards per carry |
|---|---|---|---|---|---|---|
| 1 | Clarence "Pug" Manders | Brooklyn Dodgers | 486 | 111 | 46 | 4.4 |
| 2 | George McAfee | Chicago Bears | 474 | 65 | 70 | 7.3 |
| 3 | Marshall "Biggie" Goldberg | Chicago Cardinals | 427 | 117 | 25 | 3.6 |
| 4 | Norm Standlee | Chicago Bears | 414 | 81 | 46 | 5.1 |
| 5 | Clarke Hinkle | Green Bay Packers | 393 | 129 | 20 | 3.0 |
| 6 | Dick Riffle | Pittsburgh Steelers | 388 | 109 | 54 | 3.6 |
| 7 | Frank Filchock | Washington Redskins | 383 | 115 | 51 | 3.3 |
| 8 | Bill Osmanski | Chicago Bears | 361 | 76 | 23 | 4.8 |
| 9 | Merl Condit | Brooklyn Dodgers | 357 | 91 | 41 | 3.9 |
| 10 | Tuffy Leemans | New York Giants | 332 | 100 | 26 | 3.3 |
Source: Strickler (ed.), 1942 NFL Record & Roster Manual, pp. 102-103.

=== Receiving ===
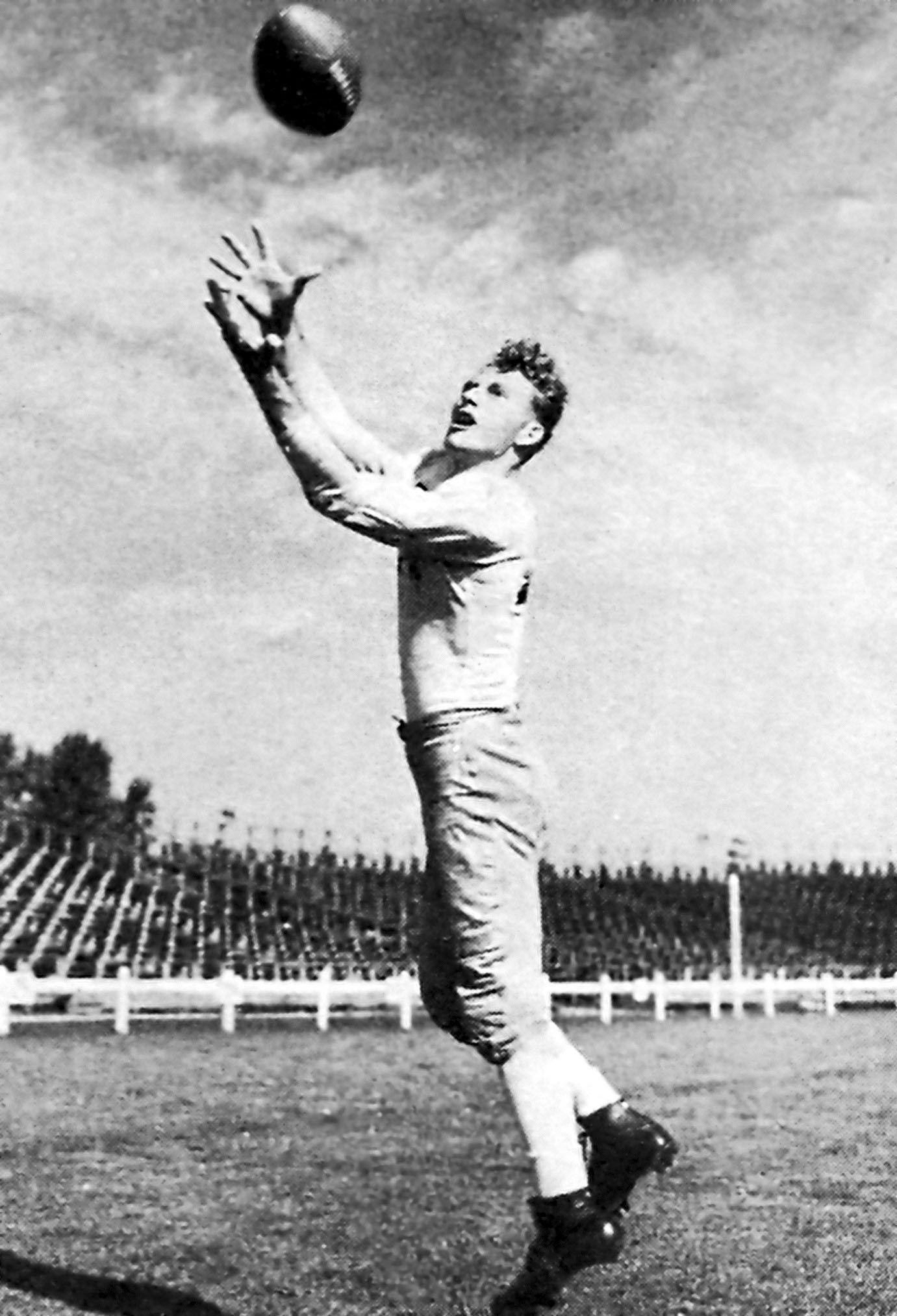
Future Hall-of-Famer Don Hutson led the league in receiving for the fourth time in 1941.

Packer end Don Hutson returned to his place of preeminence among NFL receivers, recording more than twice the yardage of the second most successful receiver in the league. He set a new NFL record for touchdowns (10) and tied the league mark for total receptions, with 58.

| Rank | Name | Team | Receiving yards | Receptions | Long gain | Touchdowns |
|---|---|---|---|---|---|---|
| 1 | Don Hutson | Green Bay Packers | 738 | 58 | 45 | 10 |
| 2 | Perry Schwartz | Brooklyn Dodgers | 362 | 25 | 36 | 2 |
| 3 | Dick Humbert | Philadelphia Eagles | 332 | 29 | 33 | 3 |
| 4 | Ward Cuff | New York Giants | 317 | 19 | 41 | 2 |
| 5 | Ken Kavanaugh | Chicago Bears | 314 | 11 | 48 | 6 |
| 6 | Marshall "Biggie" Goldberg | Chicago Cardinals | 313 | 16 | 76 | 1 |
| 7 | Lou Brock | Green Bay Packers | 307 | 22 | 36 | 2 |
| 8 | Johnny Hall | Chicago Cardinals | 302 | 16 | 80 | 2 |
| 9 | Howard "Red" Hickey | Cleveland Rams | 294 | 21 | 39 | 4 |
| 10 | Dick Plasman | Chicago Bears | 283 | 14 | 42 | 0 |
Source: Strickler (ed.), 1942 NFL Record & Roster Manual, pp. 106-107.

=== Passing ===
Green Bay tailback Cecil Isbell set new NFL marks for passing yards (1,479) and passing touchdowns (15) in 1941.

In this era still dominated by the single-wing formation, it was many times the left halfback ("tailback") that handled the bulk of passing duties, with the quarterback ("blocking back") primarily serving as an obstruction or a receiver. "Slingin' Sammy" Baugh was a single-wing halfback during the 1941 season, and it was Green Bay halfback Cecil Isbell who led the league in passing. Isbell, in fact, set new NFL single-season records for both passing yards (1,479) and touchdown passes (15).

| Rank | Name | Team | Passing Yards | Longest | Complete - Attempt | Percentage | TD : INT |
|---|---|---|---|---|---|---|---|
| 1 | Cecil Isbell | Green Bay Packers | 1,479 | 56 | 117-for-206 | 56.8% | 15 : 11 |
| 2 | Sammy Baugh | Washington Redskins | 1,236 | 55 | 106-for-193 | 54.9% | 10 : 19 |
| 3 | Sid Luckman | Chicago Bears | 1,181 | 65 | 68-for-119 | 57.1% | 9 : 6 |
| 4 | Tommy Thompson | Philadelphia Eagles | 974 | 50 | 86-for-162 | 53.1% | 8 : 14 |
| 5 | Parker Hall | Cleveland Rams | 863 | 39 | 84-for-190 | 44.2% | 7 : 19 |
| 6 | Ray Mallouf | Chicago Cardinals | 725 | 80 | 48-for-96 | 50.0% | 2 : 4 |
| 7 | Johnny Clement | Chicago Cardinals | 690 | 76 | 48-for-100 | 48.0% | 3 : 7 |
| 8 | Clyde "Ace" Parker | Brooklyn Dodgers | 642 | 47 | 51-for-102 | 50.0% | 2 : 8 |
| 9 | Tuffy Leemans | New York Giants | 475 | 44 | 31-for-66 | 46.9% | 4 : 5 |
| 10A | Bob Snyder | Chicago Bears | 353 | 59 | 13-for-28 | 46.4% | 3 : 2 |
| 10B | Young Bussey | Chicago Bears | 353 | 48 | 14-for-30 | 32.5% | 5 : 3 |
Sources: Strickler (ed.), 1942 NFL Record & Roster Manual, pp. 104-105.

== Awards ==
=== Joe F. Carr Trophy ===
League MVP Don Hutson with the 1941 Joe F. Carr Memorial Trophy.

The Joe F. Carr Trophy was presented annually by the National League as its Most Valuable Player award.

- Don Hutson, End, Green Bay Packers

=== All-National League Team ===
Six members of the Chicago Bears and five members of the Green Bay Packers were named to the All-National League Team for 1941. There were dozens of other players included as "honorable mentions".

| First Team | | — | Second Team | |
| Name | Team | Position | Name | Team |
| Don Hutson | Green Bay Packers | LE | Ray Riddick | Green Bay Packers |
| Bruiser Kinard | Brooklyn Dodgers | LT | John Mellus | New York Giants |
| Danny Fortmann | Chicago Bears | LG | Riley Matheson | Cleveland Rams |
| Bulldog Turner | Chicago Bears | C | George Svendsen | Green Bay Packers |
| Joe Kuharich | Chicago Cardinals | RG | Monk Edwards | New York Giants |
| Willie Wilkin | Washington Redskins | RT | Ed Kolman | Chicago Bears |
| Perry Schwartz | Brooklyn Dodgers | RE | Dick Plasman | Chicago Bears |
| Sid Luckman | Chicago Bears | QB | Tuffy Leemans | New York Giants |
| Cecil Isbell | Green Bay Packers | LHB | Marshall Goldberg | Chicago Cardinals |
| George McAfee | Chicago Bears | RHB | Whizzer White | Detroit Lions |
| Clarke Hinkle | Green Bay Packers | FB | Pug Manders | Brooklyn Dodgers |

== See also ==
- 1940 NFL season
- 1942 NFL season
- 1941 NFL playoffs
- 1941 NFL Championship Game
- 1941 NFL draft
- 1941 Chicago Bears season
- 1941 Green Bay Packers season
- 1941 New York Giants season
- 1941 Washington Redskins season
- Eastern and Western Divisions (NFL) 1933–69
- History of the National Football League
