= 1942 NFL All-Star Game (January) =

National Football League all-star game

Chicago Bears	NFL All-stars
35	24
Head coach: George Halas (Chicago Bears)	Head coach: Steve Owen (New York Giants)
	1	2	3	4	Total
Chicago Bears	0	21	7	7	35
NFL All-stars	3	0	14	7	24
- Date: January 4, 1942
- Stadium: Polo Grounds; New York City
- MVP: none selected
- Attendance: 17,725

TV in the United States
- Network: not televised

The 1942 National Football League All-star Game (January) was the professional football league's fourth all-star game. The game pitted the Chicago Bears, the league's champion for the 1941 season, against a team of all-stars. The game was played on Sunday, January 4, 1942, at the Polo Grounds in New York City. The Bears defeated the all-stars by a score of 35–24.

The George Halas' Bears entered the game as 4–1 favorites over the All-Stars led by New York Giants head coach Steve Owen. Although as many as 40,000 fans were expected, cold and snowy weather kept the crowd down to 17,725.

The game was originally planned to be played in Los Angeles where the first three All-Star games had been held, but it was moved to New York due to travel restrictions brought on by World War II. To support the war effort, half of the game's proceeds went to the Naval Relief Society, a sum that amounted to $25,529.84. It was the first January football game ever held in New York.
