= 1940 NFL Championship Game =

Coordinates: 38.9175°N 77.020°W

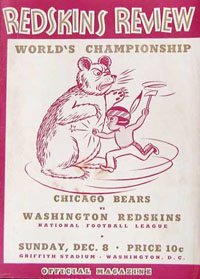
Chicago Bears (Western) (8–3)	Washington Redskins (Eastern) (9–2)
73	0
Head coach: George Halas	Head coach: Ray Flaherty
	1	2	3	4	Total
CHI	21	7	26	19	73
WAS	0	0	0	0	0
- Date: December 8, 1940
- Stadium: Griffith Stadium; Washington, D.C.
- Attendance: 36,034

Radio in the United States
- Network: Mutual
- Announcers: Red Barber

Location in the United States

The 1940 NFL Championship Game, sometimes referred to simply as 73–0, was the eighth title game of the National Football League (NFL). It was played at Griffith Stadium in Washington, D.C., on December 8, with a sellout capacity attendance of 36,034.

The Chicago Bears (8–3) of the Western Division met the Washington Redskins (9–2), champions of the Eastern Division. Neither team had played in the title game since 1937, when the Redskins won a close game at Chicago's Wrigley Field. For this game in Washington, the Bears entered as slight favorites.

The Bears scored eleven touchdowns and won 73–0, the most one-sided victory in NFL history. The game was broadcast on radio by Mutual Broadcasting System, the first NFL title game broadcast nationwide.

== Background ==
Washington had defeated Chicago 7–3 in a regular season game three weeks earlier in Washington. After the contest, Redskins owner George Preston Marshall told reporters that the Bears were crybabies and quitters when the going got tough. As the Bears prepared for the rematch, Chicago head coach George Halas fired up his team by showing them newspaper articles containing Marshall's comments, then said, "Gentlemen, this is what George Preston Marshall thinks of you. Well, I think you're a GREAT football team! Now, go out there and prove it!"

Before the game, Halas's friend Clark Shaughnessy, who was concurrently coaching the undefeated Stanford Indians, helped the Bears' gameplan. Shaughnessy devised several counters for linebacker shifts that he had noted the Redskins using.

== Game summary ==
The Bears controlled the game right from the start, using the T formation as their primary offensive strategy. On their second play from scrimmage, running back Bill Osmanski ran 68 yards for a touchdown. Washington then marched to the Chicago 26-yard line on their ensuing drive, but wide receiver Charlie Malone dropped a sure touchdown pass in the end zone that would have tied the game. The field goal attempt on 4th down was missed as well. Later in the first quarter, Bears quarterback Sid Luckman scored on a 1-yard touchdown run to increase the lead 14–0. On their third drive, Joe Maniaci ran 42 yards for the Bears' third touchdown of the game.

The Bears held a 28–0 halftime lead and then continued to crush the Redskins, scoring 45 points during the second half. After Halas took the team's starters out, the backup players continued to pile on the points. The Bears ended up recording 501 total yards on offense, 382 total rushing yards, and 8 interceptions, returning 3 for touchdowns, all in the third quarter.

So many footballs were kicked into the stands after touchdowns that officials asked Halas to run or pass for the point after touchdown on the last two touchdowns.

This game also marked the last time that an NFL player (Bears end Dick Plasman) played without a helmet. Reportedly, after the final gun went off, a sports writer jokingly yelled, "Marshall just shot himself!" Marshall's only statement to the press was, "We needed a 50-man line against their power."

Redskins quarterback Sammy Baugh was interviewed after the game, and a sportswriter asked him whether the game would have been different had Malone not dropped the tying touchdown pass. Baugh reportedly quipped, "Sure. The final score would have been 73–7."

== Legacy ==
As of 2026, Chicago's 73 points is the most scored by one team in any NFL game, regular season or postseason. Since 1940, three NFL teams have scored at least 70 points in regular season games. The regular-season record holder is the Redskins, who defeated the New York Giants 72–41 in 1966. The most recent team to reach 70 points was the Miami Dolphins, who beat the Denver Broncos 70–20 in 2023. Notably, the Dolphins had a clear opportunity to at least tie the Bears' record with 33 seconds remaining, but the Dolphins offense instead opted to effectively end the game at that point with a quarterback kneel (which was not an accepted way of ending a game in 1940).

The margin of victory is not only the largest ever in the NFL, but also remains the largest in the four major American professional team sports. On December 2, 2021, the NBA's Memphis Grizzlies matched this feat with a 73-point victory over the Oklahoma City Thunder (Memphis led by as many as 78 points in that game) with a final score of 152–79.

The First Fifty Years, a 1969 book that chronicles the first half century of the NFL, listed the game as one of "Ten Games That Mattered" to the growth of pro football in the United States. "On a Sunday in the 1940 December," the book states, "the Chicago Bears played perfect football for a greater percentage of the official hour than any team before or since. In the championship game, as an underdog to the team which had just beaten them, the Bears made an eleven-touchdown pile and used it as a pedestal to raise the NFL to view in all corners of the country. ... Pro football, the T-formation and the Chicago Bears were the sudden sports news of the year."

== Scoring summary ==
Chicago Bears 73, Washington Redskins 0

Quarter	1	2	3	4	Total
Bears	21	7	26	19	73
Redskins	0	0	0	0	0

at Griffith Stadium, Washington, D.C.

- Date: December 8, 1940
- Game time: 1:30 p.m. EST
- Pro-Football-Reference.com

Game information
First quarter
- CHI – Bill Osmanski 68-yard run (Jack Manders kick). Bears 7–0
- CHI – Sid Luckman 1-yard run (Bob Snyder kick). Bears 14–0
- CHI – Joe Maniaci 42-yard run (Phil Martinovich kick). Bears 21–0

Second Quarter

- CHI – Ken Kavanaugh 30-yard pass from Luckman (Snyder kick). Bears 28–0

Third Quarter

- CHI – Hamp Pool 15-yard interception return (Dick Plasman kick). Bears 35–0
- CHI – Ray Nolting 23-yard run (kick failed). Bears 41–0
- CHI – George McAfee 35-yard interception return (Joe Stydahar kick). Bears 48–0
- CHI – Bulldog Turner 20-yard interception return (kick failed). Bears 54–0

Fourth Quarter

- CHI – Harry Clarke 44-yard run (kick failed). Bears 60–0
- CHI – Gary Famiglietti 2-yard run (Maniaci pass from Solly Sherman). Bears 67–0
- CHI – Harry Clarke 1-yard run (pass failed). Bears 73–0

== Officials ==
- Referee: William "Red" Friesall
- Umpire: Harry Robb
- Head linesman: Irv Kupcinet
- Field judge: Fred Young

The NFL had only four game officials in 1940; the back judge was added in 1947, the line judge in 1965, and the side judge in 1978.

== Statistics ==
Source: ^{3}

=== Statistical comparison ===
Statistics	Chicago	Washington
First downs	17	17
First downs rushing	13	4
First downs passing	3	10
First downs penalty	1	3
Total yards	501	245
Passing yards	119	223
Passing – Completions-attempts	7–10	20–51
Passing – Yards per attempt	11.9	4.4
Interceptions-return yards	8–117	0–0
Rushing yards	382	22
Rushing attempts	57	14
Yards per rush	6.7	1.6
Penalties-yards	3–25	8–70
Fumbles-lost	2–1	4–1
Punts-Average	2–46.0	3–41.3

=== Individual statistics ===
Bears Passing
	C/ATT^{*}	Yds	TD	INT
Sid Luckman	3/4	88	1	0
Bob Snyder	3/3	31	0	0
Bears Rushing
	Car^{a}	Yds	TD	LG^{b}
Bill Osmanski	10	109	1	68
Harry Clarke	8	73	2	44
Joe Maniaci	6	60	2	42
Ray Nolting	13	68	1	23
Bears Receiving
	Rec^{c}	Yds	TD	LG^{b}
Joe Maniaci	3	39	0	n/a
Ken Kavanaugh	2	32	1	30

Redskins Passing
	C/ATT^{*}	Yds	TD	INT
Sammy Baugh	10/17	102	0	2
Frankie Filchock	7/23	87	0	5
Redskins Rushing
	Car^{a}	Yds	TD	LG^{b}
Frankie Filchock	2	20	0	n/a
Bob Seymour	4	16	0	n/a
Jimmy Johnston	1	5	0	n/a
Ed Justice	1	1	0	n/a
Redskins Receiving
	Rec^{c}	Yds	TD	LG^{b}
Wayne Millner	5	84	0	n/a
Bob Masterson	3	33	0	n/a

^{*}Completions/Attempts ^{a}Carries ^{b}Long play ^{c}Receptions

== Players' shares ==
The net gate receipts from the sellout were over $102,000, a record; each Bears player received $874 while each Redskins player saw $606.
