= 1940 NFL All-Star Game (December) =

National Football League all-star game

| Chicago Bears | NFL All-Stars |
|---|---|
| 28 | 14 |
| Head coach: Luke Johnsos (Chicago Bears) | Head coach: Ray Flaherty (Washington Redskins) |
| | 1 | 2 | 3 | 4 | Total |
|---|---|---|---|---|---|
| Chicago Bears | 7 | 7 | 7 | 7 | 28 |
| NFL All-Stars | 0 | 14 | 0 | 0 | 14 |
- Date: December 29, 1940
- Stadium: Gilmore Stadium; Los Angeles, California
- MVP: none selected
- Referee: John Olds
- Attendance: 21,000

TV in the United States
- Network: not televised

The 1940 National Football League All-star Game (December) was the professional football league's third all-star game. The game pitted the Chicago Bears, the league's champion for the 1940 season, against a team of all-stars. The game was played on Sunday, December 29, 1940, at Gilmore Stadium in Los Angeles, California before an overflow crowd of 21,000, with members of the Stanford and Nebraska football teams also in attendance; the two were scheduled to play in the Rose Bowl, with Nebraska using the All-Star Game to research the Bears' T formation, which was being used by Stanford head coach and former Bears assistant Clark Shaughnessy. The Bears defeated the All-Stars by a score of 28–14.

The Bears were an 8–5 favorite over the All-Stars after crushing the Washington Redskins 73–0 in the championship game a few weeks earlier. Luke Johnsos coached the Bears in place of George Halas, who was hospitalized following an appendectomy. The All-Stars were coached by Ray Flaherty of the Washington Redskins. John Olds was the referee for the game.

Quarterback Ace Parker of the Brooklyn Dodgers was voted into the game, but declined participation due to ankle and shoulder injuries he suffered during the season. His decision sparked a clash with NFL President Carl Storck, who warned him of potential expulsion from the league should he not play until Dodgers owner Dan Topping successfully pulled him out without consequence. Rather than the All-Star Game, Parker decided to play two charity games in Virginia over the following weeks.
