= 1941 NFL Championship Game =

Coordinates: 41.948°N 87.656°W

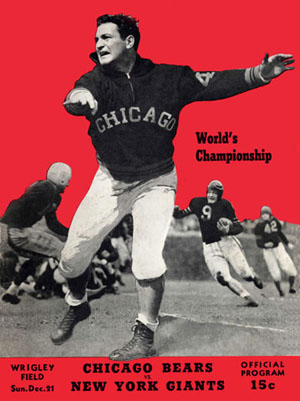
New York Giants (Eastern) (8–3)	Chicago Bears (Western) (10–1)
9	37
Head coach: Steve Owen	Head coach: George Halas
	1	2	3	4	Total
NYG	6	0	3	0	9
CHI	3	6	14	14	37
- Date: December 21, 1941
- Stadium: Wrigley Field; Chicago, Illinois
- Favorite: Chicago by 15
- Attendance: 13,341

Radio in the United States
- Network: Mutual
- Announcers: Bob Elson, Red Barber

Location in the United States

The 1941 NFL Championship Game was the ninth annual championship game of the National Football League (NFL), held at Wrigley Field in Chicago on December 21. Played two weeks after the Japanese attack on Pearl Harbor, the attendance was 13,341, the fewest to see an NFL title game. However, this statistic might be explained in part by wartime restrictions.

== Western Division playoff game ==
Before the title game, the Western Division champion needed to be determined. The defending NFL champion Chicago Bears (10–1) had ended the regular season on December 7 tied with the Green Bay Packers (10–1), the 1939 NFL champions. The two had split their season series in 1941, with the road teams winning, so the tiebreaker was the first-ever divisional playoff game in the NFL, played on December 14 at Wrigley Field.

The Packers had completed their regular season on November 30 and the playoff game was sold out by Tuesday, December 9, at over 46,484, with over 10,000 seats to Packer fans. Chicago was favored, and attendance on game day was slightly lower than capacity at 43,425, the week after Pearl Harbor. The Bears jumped to a 30–7 halftime lead under clear skies and 16 °F (−9 °C) temperatures and easily won, 33–14. The Eastern Division champion New York Giants (8–3) completed their regular season on December 7 with a 21–7 loss to the runner-up Brooklyn Dodgers (7–4), who had defeated the Giants twice in the regular season.

== NFL Championship Game ==
The Bears were making their fifth appearance in the title game, the Giants were making their sixth, and each had two victories. It was the third time the two teams matched up in the big game; the home teams had won both: the Bears in 1933 and the Giants in 1934. The Bears were favored by two touchdowns and 35,000 were expected to attend. The game time temperature was unseasonably warm at 47 °F (8 °C).

The hometown Bears kicked three field goals in the first half to lead 9–6 at the intermission. The Giants took the opening drive of the second half down to the five but settled for a short field goal to tie the score. Chicago dominated the rest of the second half with four unanswered touchdowns and won 37–9.

The Bears became the first team in the NFL championship game era (since 1933) to win consecutive titles; it was the franchise's fifth league title (1921, 1932, 1933, 1940, 1941).

=== Scoring summary ===
Chicago Bears 37, New York Giants 9

Quarter	1	2	3	4	Total
Giants	6	0	3	0	9
Bears	3	6	14	14	37

at Wrigley Field in Chicago, Illinois

- Date: December 21, 1941
- Game time: 1:00 p.m. CST
- Pro-Football-Reference

Game information

- First quarter
  - CHI – Bob Snyder 14-yard field goal. Bears 3–0
  - NYG – George Franck 31-yard pass from Tuffy Leemans (kick failed). Giants 6–3
- Second quarter
  - CHI – Bob Snyder 39-yard field goal. Tied 6–6
  - CHI – Bob Snyder 37-yard field goal. Bears 9–6
- Third quarter
  - NYG – Ward Cuff 16-yard field goal. Tied 9–9
  - CHI – Norm Standlee 2-yard run (Snyder kick). Bears 16–9
  - CHI – Norm Standlee 7-yard run (Joe Maniaci kick). Bears 23–9
- Fourth quarter
  - CHI – George McAfee 5-yard run (Lee Artoe kick). Bears 30–9
  - CHI – Ken Kavanaugh 42-yard fumble return (Ray McLean kick). Bears 37–9

Top passers

- NYG – Tuffy Leemans – 3/9, 73 yards, 1 TD, 3 INT
- CHI – Sid Luckman – 9/12, 160 yards

Top rushers

- NYG – Tuffy Leemans – 9 rushes, 52 yards
- CHI – Norm Standlee – 17 rushes, 89 yards, 2 TD

Top receivers

- NYG – Ward Cuff – 2 receptions, 42 yards
- CHI – Dick Plasman – 2 receptions, 48 yards

With under two minutes remaining, Ray "Scooter" McLean elected to drop kick the extra point on the last touchdown, which was the last successful drop kick in the NFL for 64 years. Doug Flutie of the New England Patriots kicked one in his final regular season game, in the fourth quarter of the last game of the 2005 regular season on January 1, 2006.

== Officials ==
- Referee: Emil Heintz
- Umpire: John Schommer
- Head linesman: Charlie Berry
- Field judge: Chuck Sweeney

The NFL had only four game officials in 1941; the back judge was added in 1947, the line judge in 1965, and the side judge in 1978.

== Players' shares ==
With the low attendance, the net gate receipts were a record low at under $42,000. Each Bears player received $431, while each Giants player saw $288, less than half of the previous year's.

Ticket prices were $4.40 for the grandstand and $2.20 for bleachers.

== War casualties ==
Two players in the game, back Young Bussey of the Bears and end Jack Lummus of the Giants, were killed in action three years later in World War II, in early 1945. Navy lieutenant Bussey died in the Invasion of Lingayen Gulf in the Philippines and Marine lieutenant Lummus was posthumously awarded the Medal of Honor for valor at the Battle of Iwo Jima.

== See also ==
- 1941 NFL playoffs
- 1941 NFL season
- History of the NFL championship
- Bears–Giants rivalry
