= List of Chicago Bears team records =

The Chicago Bears are a National Football League (NFL) franchise based in Chicago. This article lists all the individual and team statistical records complied since the franchise's birth in 1920.

== Table key ==
Table key
active	Active players are listed in italics
*	Tie between two or more players/teams
†	Tied for NFL record
§	NFL record

== Individual club appearance records ==
Career individual appearance records
Statistic	Record	Player	Bears career	Ref
Most seasons in a Bears uniform	16	Patrick Mannelly	1998–2013	
Most games played in a Bears uniform	245	Patrick Mannelly	1998–2013	
Most games started in a Bears uniform	184	Walter Payton	1975–87	
Most consecutive games played in a Bears uniform	191	Steve McMichael	1981–93	
Most Pro Bowls	10	Mike Singletary	1984–93	

== Individual career records ==
Career offensive scoring records
Statistic	Record	Player	Bears career	Ref
Points	1,207	Robbie Gould	2005–2015	
Touchdowns	125	Walter Payton	1975-87	
Net total yards	21,803	Walter Payton	1975–87	

Career offensive rushing records
Statistic	Record	Player	Bears career	Ref
Rushing yards	16,726	Walter Payton	1975–87	
Rushing attempts	3,838	Walter Payton	1975–87	
Average gain with at least 250+ rushing attempts	6.6	Bobby Douglass	1969–75	
Rushing touchdowns	110	Walter Payton	1975–87	
Two-point conversions	6	Matt Forte	2008–2015	
Fumbles	86	Walter Payton	1975–87	
Average rushing yards per game	88.0	Walter Payton	1975–87	
100 yard rushing games	77	Walter Payton	1975–87	

Career offensive passing records
Statistic	Record	Player	Bears career	Ref
Passing yards	23,443	Jay Cutler	2009-2016	
Passing completions	2,020	Jay Cutler	2009-2016	
Passing attempts	3,271	Jay Cutler	2009-2016	
Passing touchdowns	154	Jay Cutler	2009-2016	
Completion percentage (300+ completions)	64.1%	Mitchell Trubisky	2017-2020	
Passing interceptions	132	Sid Luckman	1939–50	
Average gain per attempt (400+ attempts)	8.4	Sid Luckman	1939–50	
Career lowest interception percentage per pass attempt	2.69%	Jim Miller	1998–02	
Quarterback rating (400+ attempts)	85.2	Jay Cutler	2009-2016	
300 yard passing games	16	Jay Cutler	2009-2016	
Most times sacked	251	Jay Cutler	2009-2016	

Career offensive receiving records
Statistic	Record	Player	Bears career	Ref
Receptions	492	Walter Payton	1975–87	
Receiving yards	5,059	Johnny Morris	1958–67	
Receiving touchdowns	50	Ken Kavanaugh	1940–41; 1945–50	
Average gain (100+ attempts)	22.4	Ken Kavanaugh	1940–41; 1945–50	
100 yard receiving games	19	Harlon Hill	1954–61	

Career defensive records
Statistic	Record	Player	Bears career	Ref
Sacks	124.5	Richard Dent	1983–93; 1995	
Tackles	1,488	Mike Singletary	1981-1992	
Takeaways	50	Gary Fencik	1976–87	
Defensive touchdowns	9	Charles Tillman	2003–2014	
Interceptions	38	Gary Fencik	1976–87	
Interceptions return yards	675	Charles Tillman	2003–2014	
Interceptions returned for touchdowns	8	Charles Tillman	2003–2014	
Fumbles recovered	25	Dick Butkus	1965–73	
Forced fumbles	42	Charles Tillman	2003–2014	
Fumble return yards	221	Mike Brown	2000–08	
Fumbles returned for touchdowns	3	Mike Brown	2000–08	
Safeties	3	Steve McMichael	1981–93	

Career kicking records
Statistic	Record	Player	Bears career	Ref
Field goals made	276	Robbie Gould	2005–2015	
Field goals attempted	332	Kevin Butler	1985–95	
Extra points made	387	Kevin Butler	1985–95	
Extra points attempted	397	Kevin Butler	1985–95	
50+ yards field goals made	20	Robbie Gould	2005–2015	
Field goal percentage (25+ attempts)	85.4%	Robbie Gould	2005–2015	

Career punting records
Statistic	Record	Player	Bears career	Ref
Punts	884	Bob Parsons	1972–83	
Punts inside 20	284	Brad Maynard	2001–10	
Punt yards	36,781	Brad Maynard	2001–10	
Punt gross average (75+ punts)	44.5	George Gulyanics	1947–52	
Punts blocked	5	Maury Buford	1985–86; 1989–91	
Punts blocked	5	Ed Brown	1954–1961	
Punts blocked	5	Bob Parsons	1973–1983	

Career returning records
Statistic	Record	Player	Bears career	Ref
Kickoff returns	222	Devin Hester	2006–2013	
Kickoff return yards	5,510	Devin Hester	2006–2013	
Kickoff return average (50+ returns)	30.6§	Gale Sayers	1965–71	
Kickoff return touchdowns	6†	Gale Sayers	1965–71	
Punt returns	264	Devin Hester	2006–2013	
Punt return yards	3,241	Devin Hester	2006–2013	
Punt return touchdowns	13§	Devin Hester	2006–2013	
Punt return average (50+ returns)	12.8	George McAfee	1940–41; 1945–50	
Return touchdowns	19§	Devin Hester	2006–2013	
Combined returns	486	Devin Hester	2006–2013	
Combined return yards	8,751	Devin Hester	2006–2013	
Fair catches	79	Devin Hester	2006–2013	

== Individual single season records ==
Single season offensive records
Statistic	Record	Player	Season	Ref
Points	144	Kevin Butler	1985	
Touchdowns	22	Gale Sayers	1965	
Net total yards	2,440	Gale Sayers	1966	
Rushing yards	1,852	Walter Payton	1977	
Rushing touchdowns	14	Gale Sayers and Walter Payton (twice)	1965 (Sayers), 1977 & 1979 (Payton)	
Average gain with 100+ rushing attempts	8.4§	Beattie Feathers	1934	
Rushing attempts	381	Walter Payton	1984	
Fumbles	15	Jim Harbaugh	1993	
Passing yards	3,942	Caleb Williams	2025	
Passing touchdowns	29	Erik Kramer	1995	
Passing attempts	568	Caleb Williams	2025	
Passing completions	370	Jay Cutler	2014	
Most times sacked	68	Caleb Williams	2024	
Passing completion percentage with 75+ completions	66.5%	Josh McCown	2013	
Passing interceptions	31	Sid Luckman	1947	
Average gain per attempt with 100+ attempts	10.860	Sid Luckman	1943	
Quarterback rating	109.0	Josh McCown	2013	
300 yard passing games	5	Jay Cutler	2014	
300 yard passing games	5	Bill Wade	1962	
300 yard passing games	5	Mitch Trubisky	2018*	
300 yard passing games	5	Caleb Williams	2024	
300 yard passing games	5	Brian Hoyer	2016	
Receptions	118	Brandon Marshall	2012	
Two-point conversions	2	Martellus Bennett	2014	
Two-point conversions	2	Matt Forte	2014	
Two-point conversions	2	Brandon Marshall	2013	
Average gain with 30+ receptions	25.6	Ken Kavanaugh	1947	
Receiving yards	1,508	Brandon Marshall	2012	
Receiving touchdowns	13	Dick Gordon	1970	
Receiving touchdowns	13	Ken Kavanaugh	1947	
100 yard receiving games	7	(4 times) Last: Brandon Marshall	2012	

Single season defensive records
Statistic	Record	Player	Season	Ref
Sacks	18	Robert Quinn	2021	
Takeaways	13	Charles Tillman	2012	
Interceptions	10	Mark Carrier	1990	
Forced fumbles	10†	Charles Tillman	2012	
Interception return yards	212	Richie Petitbon	1962	
Fumbles recovered	6	Dick Butkus	1965	
Fumble return yards	101	Brian Urlacher	2001	
Fumble return yards	101	Charlie Sumner	1958	
Fumbles returned for touchdown	2†	Fred Evans	1948	

Single season kicking records
Statistic	Record	Player	Season	Ref
Field goals made	33	Robbie Gould	2015	
Field goal attempts	41	Kevin Butler	1986	
Field goal percentage (10+ attempts)	89.7	Robbie Gould	2008	
Extra points made	52	Roger LeClerc	1965	
Extra points attempted	52	Roger LeClerc	1965	

Single season punting records
Statistic	Record	Player	Season	Ref
Punts	114†	Bob Parsons	1981	
Punt yards	4,638	Brad Maynard	2004	
Punts inside 20	40	Brad Maynard	2008	
Punt gross average (30+ attempts)	46.5	Bobby Joe Green	1963	
Punt net average (30+ attempts)	40.4	Adam Podlesh	2011	
Punts blocked	2	Brad Maynard	2003	

Single season returning records
Statistic	Record	Player	Season	Ref
Combined kick returns	98	Glyn Milburn	2000	
Kickoff returns	63	Glyn Milburn	2000	
Kickoff return yards	1,550	Glyn Milburn	1998	
Kickoff return average	37.7	Gale Sayers	1967	
Kickoff return touchdowns	5	Devin Hester	1970	
Punt returns	58	Jeff Fisher	1984	
Punt return touchdowns	4†	Devin Hester	2006	
Punt returns average	17.1§	Devin Hester	2010	
Punt return yards	651	Devin Hester	2007	
Return touchdowns	14	Devin Hester	2006	
Fair catches	26	Glyn Milburn	2000	

== Individual single game records ==
Single game offensive records
Statistic	Record	Player	Opponent	Date	Ref
Points	36	Gale Sayers	San Francisco 49ers	12/12/65	
Touchdowns	6	Gale Sayers	San Francisco 49ers	12/12/65	
Net total yards	339	Gale Sayers	Minnesota Vikings	12/18/66	
Rushing yards	275	Walter Payton	Minnesota Vikings	11/20/77	
Average gain (10+ rushing attempts)	11.8	Joe Maniaci	Pittsburgh Pirates	10/2/39	
Rushing attempts	40	Walter Payton	Minnesota Vikings	11/20/77	
Rushing touchdowns	4	(3 times) Last: Bobby Douglass	Green Bay Packers	11/4/73	
Fumbles	4	Rusty Lisch	Green Bay Packers	12/9/84	
Passing yards	468	Johnny Lujack	Chicago Cardinals	12/11/49	
Passing touchdowns	7	Sid Luckman	Brooklyn Dodgers	11/14/43	
Passing attempts	60	Erik Kramer	New York Jets	11/16/97	
Passing completions	36	Josh McCown	St. Louis Rams	11/24/13	
Consecutive completions	16	Justin Fields	Denver Broncos	10/1/23	
Completion percentage (10+ completions)	86.7%	Bob Williams	Dallas Texans	10/12/52	
Interceptions thrown	7	Zeke Bratkowski	Baltimore Colts	10/2/60	
Passes not intercepted	50	Erik Kramer	Miami Dolphins	10/27/97	
Receptions	14	Jim Keane	New York Giants	10/23/49	
Receiving yards	249	Alshon Jeffery	Minnesota Vikings	12/1/13	
Average gain (4+ receptions)	44.8	Dick Gordon	St. Louis Cardinals	11/19/67	
Receiving touchdowns	4	Mike Ditka	Los Angeles Rams	10/13/63	
Receiving touchdowns	4	Harlon Hill	San Francisco 49ers	10/31/54	

Single game defensive records
Statistic	Record	Player	Opponent	Date	Ref
Sacks	4.5	Richard Dent	Los Angeles Raiders	11/4/84	
Sacks	4.5	Richard Dent	Los Angeles Raiders	12/22/87	
Takeaways	4	Bill George	Detroit Lions	12/3/61	
Interceptions	3	Mark Carrier	Washington Redskins	12/9/90	
Interception yards returned	101	Richie Petitbon	Los Angeles Rams	12/9/62	
Forced fumbles	4§	Charles Tillman	Tennessee Titans	11/4/12	
Fumble return yards	98	George Halas	Oorang Indians	11/4/23	
Fumbles recovered	3†	John Thierry	Houston Oilers	10/22/95	
Fumbles recovered	3†	Virgil Livers	Minnesota Vikings	10/5/75	

Single game kicking records
Statistic	Record	Player	Opponent	Date	Ref
Field goals made	5	Roger LeClerc	Detroit Lions	12/3/61	
Field goals made	5	Mac Percival	Philadelphia Eagles	10/20/68	
Longest field goal made	58	Robbie Gould	Cincinnati Bengals	9/8/13	
Field goals attempted	7	Roger LeClerc	Green Bay Packers	11/17/63	
Extra points made	8	Bob Snyder	New York Giants	11/14/43	
Extra points attempted	9	Bob Thomas	Green Bay Packers	12/7/80	

Single game punting records
Statistic	Record	Player	Opponent	Date	Ref
Punts	14	Keith Molesworth	Green Bay Packers	12/10/33	
Punt yards	524	Todd Sauerbrun	New Orleans Saints	10/5/97	
Punts inside 20	6	Brad Maynard	Green Bay Packers	12/9/01	

Single game returning records
Statistic	Record	Player	Opponent	Date	Ref
Kickoff returns	10	Chris Williams	Green Bay Packers	11/9/14	
Kickoff return yards	288	Chris Williams	Green Bay Packers	11/9/14	
Kickoff return touchdowns	2†	Devin Hester	St. Louis Rams	12/11/06	
Punt returns	8	Jeff Fisher	Detroit Lions	12/16/84	
Punt return yards	152	Devin Hester	Arizona Cardinals	10/16/06	
Return touchdowns	2†	Devin Hester	St. Louis Rams	12/11/06	
Return touchdowns	2†	Devin Hester	Denver Broncos	11/25/07	

== Individual rookie season records ==
Rookie season offensive records
Statistic	Record	Player	Season	Ref
Points	144§	Kevin Butler	1985	
Touchdowns	22§	Gale Sayers	1965	
Rushing attempts	316	Matt Forte	2008	
Rushing yards	1,313	Jordan Howard	2016	
Rushing touchdowns	14	Gale Sayers	1965	
Passing attempts	562	Caleb Williams	2024	
Passing completions	351	Caleb Williams	2024	
Passing yards	3,541	Caleb Williams	2024	
Passing touchdowns	20	Caleb Williams	2024	
Interceptions thrown	17	Zeke Bratkowski	1954	
Receptions	63	Matt Forte	2008	
Receiving yards	1,124	Harlon Hill	1954	
Receiving touchdowns	12	Mike Ditka	1961	
Receiving touchdowns	12	Harlon Hill	1954	

Rookie season defensive records
Statistic	Record	Player	Season	Ref
Sacks	12.0	Mark Anderson	2006	
Interceptions	10	Mark Carrier	1990	

Rookie season kicking records
Statistic	Record	Player	Season	Ref
Field goals	31	Kevin Butler	1985	

Rookie season punting records
Statistic	Record	Player	Season	Ref
Punts	83	Dave Finzer	1984	
Punting yards	3,328	Dave Finzer	1984	
Punting average	44.8	George Gulyanics	1947	

Rookie season returning records
Statistic	Record	Player	Season	Ref
Punt returns	57§	Lew Barnes	1986	
Punt return yards	600	Devin Hester	2006	
Punt return touchdowns	3	Devin Hester	2006	
Kickoff returns	32	Johnny Knox	2009	
Kickoff return yards	927	Johnny Knox	2009	
Kickoff return touchdowns	2	Devin Hester	2006	
Return touchdowns	6§	Devin Hester	2006	

== Individual career postseason records ==
Career postseason records
Statistic	Record	Player	Bears career	Ref
Most Bear playoff game appearances	13	Mark Bortz	1983–94	
Most Bear playoff games started	12	Mark Bortz	1983–94	
Most Bear playoff games started	12	Jay Hilgenberg	1981–91	
Most Bear playoff games started	12	Mike Singletary	1981–92	
Most Bear playoff games started	12	Keith Van Horne	1981–93	

Career postseason offensive records
Statistic	Record	Player	Bears career	Ref
Points	74	Kevin Butler	1985–95	
Touchdowns	4	Thomas Jones	2004–06	
Rushing yards	632	Walter Payton	1975–87	
Rushing attempts	180	Walter Payton	1975–87	
Rushing touchdowns	4	Thomas Jones	2004–06	
Rushing touchdowns	4	Norm Standlee	1941	
Passing yards	967	Jim McMahon	1982–88	
Passing attempts	133	Rex Grossman	2003–08	
Passing completions	70	Jim McMahon	1982–88	
Passing touchdowns	9	Sid Luckman	1939–50	
Interceptions thrown	5	Mike Tomczak	1985–90	
Receptions	22	Walter Payton	1975–87	
Receiving yards	454	Willie Gault	1983–87	
Receiving touchdowns	4	Dennis McKinnon	1983–85; 1987-89	

Career postseason defensive records
Statistic	Record	Player	Bears career	Ref
Sacks	10.5	Richard Dent	1983–93; 95	
Interceptions	4	George McAfee	1940–41; 1945-50	
Interceptions	4	Clyde Turner	1940–51	
Interception return yards	68	George McAfee	1940–41; 1945-50	
Interception touchdowns	1	(6 tied), Last: Jerry Azumah	1999–05	

Career postseason kicking records
Statistic	Record	Player	Bears career	Ref
Field goals	16	Kevin Butler	1985–95	
Punts	44	Brad Maynard	2001–10	
Punt yards	1,766	Brad Maynard	2001–10	
Punt returns	11	Devin Hester	2006–2013	
Punt returns	11	Keith Ortego	1985–87	
Punt return yardage	108	George McAfee	1940–41; 1945-50	
Punt return touchdowns	1	Hugh Gallarneau	1941–1942; 1945–1947	
Punt return touchdowns	1	Shaun Gayle	1984–94	
Kick returns	17	Dennis Gentry	1982–92	
Kick return yardage	435	Dennis Gentry	1982–92	
Kick return touchdowns	1	Devin Hester	2006–2013	

== Individual single game postseason records ==
Single game postseason offensive records
Statistic	Record	Player	Opponent	Date	Ref
Points	15	Jack Manders	Washington Redskins	12/12/37	
Touchdowns	2	(12 times), Last:Jay Cutler	Seattle Seahawks	1/16/11	
Rushing yards	123	Thomas Jones	New Orleans Saints	1/21/07	
Rushing attempts	27	Neal Anderson	New Orleans Saints	1/6/91	
Rushing attempts	27	Walter Payton	New York Giants	1/5/86	
Rushing touchdowns	2	(7 times), Last: Jay Cutler	Seattle Seahawks	1/16/11	
Passing yards	361	Caleb Williams	Green Bay Packers	1/10/26	
Passing attempts	44	Jim Harbaugh	Dallas Cowboys	12/29/91	
Passing completions	26	Mitchell Trubisky	Philadelphia Eagles	1/6/19	
Passing touchdowns	5	Sid Luckman	Washington Redskins	12/26/43	
Interceptions thrown	4	Bob Avellini	Dallas Cowboys	12/26/77	
Receptions	10	Matt Forte	Green Bay Packers	1/23/11	
Receiving yards	143	Allen Robinson	Philadelphia Eagles	1/6/19	
Receiving touchdowns	2	(3 times), Last: Dennis McKinnon	New York Giants	1/5/86	

Single game postseason defensive records
Statistic	Record	Player	Opponent	Date	Ref
Sacks	3.5	Richard Dent	New York Giants	1/5/86	
Interceptions	2	(6 times), Last: Gary Fencik	San Francisco 49ers	1/5/85	
Interception return yards	61	Larry Morris	New York Giants	12/29/63	
Interception touchdowns	1	(6 tied) Last: Jerry Azumah	Philadelphia Eagles	01/19/02	

Single game postseason kicking/punting/return records
Statistic	Record	Player	Opponent	Date	Ref
Field goals	3	Robbie Gould	New Orleans Saints	1/21/07	
Punts	10	(2 times), Last: Maury Buford	Los Angeles Rams	1/12/86	
Punt yards	398	Keith Molesworth	New York Giants	12/17/33	
Punt returns	6	George McAfee	Los Angeles Rams	12/17/50	
Punt return yardage	81	Hugh Gallarneau	Green Bay Packers	12/14/41	
Punt return touchdowns	1	Hugh Gallarneau	Green Bay Packers	12/14/41	
Punt return touchdowns	1	Shaun Gayle	New York Giants	1/5/86	
Kick returns	7	Don Bingham	New York Giants	12/30/56	
Kick return yardage	127	Dennis Gentry	Washington Redskins	1/3/87	
Kick return touchdowns	1	Devin Hester	Indianapolis Colts	2/4/07	

== Team records ==
Team season results records
Statistic	Record	Season
Best record	15-1 (16 games)	1985
Worst record	1-13 (14 games)	1969
Highest winning percentage	1.000†	1942 (11 games)
Highest winning percentage	1.000†	1934 (13 games)
Lowest winning percentage	.071	1969 (14 games)
Most consecutive losses	10	2022 (17 games)
Most losses	14	2022 (17 games)
Home wins	9	1926 (11 home games)
Most consecutive home losses	7	2022 (9 home games)
Road wins	7	(5 times) Last: 2006 (8 road games)
Most consecutive road losses	8	2016 (8 road games)

Team offensive records
Statistic	Record	Season
Most touchdowns in a season	56	1941 (11 games)
Fewest touchdowns in a season	16	1933 (13 games)
Most times sacked in a season	66	2004 (16 games)
Fewest times sacked in a season	15	1995 (16 games)
Fewest field goals made in a season	0†	1944 (10 games)
Most points scored in a season	456	1985 (16 games)
Most total yards in a season	6,109	2013 (16 games)
Most passing yards in a season	4,450	2013 (16 games)
Most rushing yards in a season	3,014	2022 (17 games)
Most passing touchdowns in a season	32	2013 (16 games)
Most first downs in a season	344	2013 (16 games)
Fewest points scored in a season	133	1933 (13 games)
Most two-point conversions	5	(2 times) Last: 2013 (16 games)

Team defensive records
Statistic	Record	Season
Most takeaways in a season	58	1947 (12 games)
Most defensive touchdowns scored in a season	9	2012 (16 games)
Fewest rushing yards allowed in a season	519	1942 (11 games)
Most total yards allowed in a season	6,109	2013 (16 games)
Most passing yards allowed in a season	3,730	2013 (16 games)
Most rushing yards allowed in a season	2,583	2013 (16 games)
Fewest takeaways in a season	11	2016 (16 games)
Most sacks in a season	72	1984 (16 games)
Fewest sacks in a season	18	2003 (16 games)
Most points allowed in a season	478	2013 (16 games)
Fewest points allowed in a season	21	1920 (13 games)

== Miscellaneous club game records ==
- Longest run from scrimmage – Bill Osmanski rushed 86 yards vs. the Chicago Cardinals, 10/15/1939.
- Longest pass from scrimmage – Bo Farrington caught 98-yard pass at the Detroit Lions, 10/8/1961.
- Longest play in Bears history – 108 yard missed field goal return, Nathan Vasher, vs. San Francisco 49ers, 11/13/2005; Devin Hester, at New York Giants, 11/12/2006.
- Most times sacked in a game – 10, vs. New York Giants, 10/3/2010
- Most takeaways in a game – 12†, at Detroit Lions 11/22/1942 (7 int, 5 fum)
- Most points scored in a preseason game at home – 50, vs. Pittsburgh Steelers, 8/22/1987
- Most points scored in a preseason game on road – 60, at Portland All-Stars, 1/30/1926, at Cicero Boosters, 9/10/1933, at Brandt Florals, 9/26/1937
- Most points scored in a preseason game neutral site – 59, St. Louis Gunners, 9/14/1940
- Most points allowed in a preseason game at home – 41, vs. Buffalo Bills, 8/21/2021
- Most points allowed in a preseason game on road – 66, at Kansas City Chiefs, 8/23/1967
- Most points scored by both teams in a preseason game at home – 73, Bears (42) vs. Cleveland Browns (31), 9/12/1958
- Most points scored by both teams in a preseason game on road – 90, Bears (24) at Kansas City Chiefs (66), 8/23/1967
- Fewest points scored by both teams in a preseason game at home – 13 Bears (3) vs. St Louis Cardinals (10), 8/28/1982, Bears (10) vs. Buffalo Bills (3), 8/13/2011
- Fewest points scored by both teams in a preseason game on road – 0, at College All-Stars, 8/31/1934
- Fewest points scored by both teams in a preseason game neutral site – 3, Bears (3) Philadelphia Eagles (0), 8/30/1958
- Most points scored in a game at home – 61, vs. Green Bay Packers, 12/7/1980, vs. San Francisco 49ers, 12/12/1965
- Most points scored in a game on road – 57, at Baltimore Colts, 11/25/1962
- Largest winning margin in a game at home – 54, Bears (61) vs. Green Bay Packers (7), 12/7/1980
- Largest winning margin in a game on road – 57, Bears (57) at Baltimore Colts (0), 11/25/1962
- Most points allowed in a game at home – 48, vs. Arizona Cardinals 9/20/2015
- Most points allowed in a game on road – 55, at Detroit Lions 11/27/1997, at Green Bay Packers 11/9/2014
- Largest losing margin in a game at home – 34, Bears (6) vs. Chicago Cardinals (40), 11/28/1929, Bears (0) vs. San Francisco 49ers (34), 11/17/1974
- Largest losing margin in a game on road – 52, Bears (0) at Baltimore Colts (52), 9/27/1964
- Most points scored by both teams in a game at home – 89, Bears (48) vs. Minnesota Vikings (41), 10/19/2008
- Most points scored by both teams in a game on road – 89, Bears (47) at Cincinnati Bengals (42), 11/2/2025, Bears (38) at Baltimore Colts (51), 10/4/1958
- Fewest points scored by both teams in a game at home – 0, 10 times
- Fewest points scored by both teams in a game on road – 0, 7 times
- Fewest points scored by both teams in a game at home since 1940 – 3, Bears (3) vs. Detroit Lions (0), 12/16/1962
- Fewest points scored by both teams in a game on road since 1940 – 7, Bears (7) at Buffalo Bills (0), 10/7/1979
- Biggest comeback in a game at home – 19, vs. San Francisco 49ers, 10/28/2001
- Biggest comeback in a game on road – 20, at Tampa Bay Buccaneers, 10/25/1987, at Arizona Cardinals, 10/16/2006
- Biggest comeback in a game in the 4th quarter at home – 17, vs. Detroit Lions, 10/4/1998
- Biggest comeback in a game in the 4th quarter on road – 17, at Detroit Lions, 9/13/2020
- Biggest blown lead in a game at home – 21, vs. San Francisco 49ers, 10/18/1953, vs. New England Patriots, 11/10/2002, vs. Denver Broncos, 10/1/2023
- Biggest blown lead in a game on road – 20, at Minnesota Vikings, 10/4/1992, at Green Bay Packers, 9/9/2018
- Biggest blown lead in a game in the 4th quarter at home – 14, vs. Detroit Lions 11/13/2022, vs. Denver Broncos, 10/1/2023
- Biggest blown lead in a game in the 4th quarter on road – 20, at Minnesota Vikings, 10/4/1992
- Most points scored in first half at home – 41, vs. San Francisco 49ers, 10/29/2006, vs. Washington Redskins, 11/28/1948
- Most points scored in first half on road – 35, at Philadelphia Eagles, 10/4/1987, at Detroit Lions, 9/29/1963, at Los Angeles Rams, 10/5/1941
- Most points scored in second half at home – 38, vs. Baltimore Colts, 10/21/1956
- Most points scored in second half on road – 49, at Philadelphia Eagles, 11/30/1941 (NFL Records)
- Most points scored in first quarter at home – 24, vs. San Francisco 49ers, 10/29/2006
- Most points scored in first quarter on road – 28, at Tennessee Titans, 11/4/2012
- Most points scored in second quarter at home – 31, vs. Washington Redskins, 9/29/1985
- Most points scored in second quarter on road – 28, at Buffalo Bills, 11/4/2018, at Philadelphia Eagles, 10/4/1987, at Detroit Lions, 9/29/1963, at Los Angeles Rams, 10/5/1941
- Most points scored in third quarter at home – 24, vs. Minnesota Vikings, 12/17/1961
- Most points scored in third quarter on road – 27, at Chicago Cardinals, 12/5/1937
- Most points scored in fourth quarter at home – 28, vs. Minnesota Vikings, 9/17/1989
- Most points scored in fourth quarter on road – 28, at Jacksonville Jaguars, 10/7/2012, at Card-Pitt, 12/3/1944, at Philadelphia Eagles, 11/30/1941
- Most points allowed in first half at home – 33, vs. New England Patriots, 12/12/2010
- Most points allowed in first half on road – 42, at Green Bay Packers, 11/9/2014
- Most points allowed in second half at home – 33, vs. Cleveland Browns, 11/14/1954
- Most points allowed in second half on road – 38, at Detroit Lions 11/27/1997
- Most points allowed in first quarter at home – 17, vs. Green Bay Packers, 9/29/2003
- Most points allowed in first quarter on road – 27, at Baltimore Colts, 10/4/1958
- Most points allowed in second quarter at home – 26, vs. New England Patriots, 12/12/2010
- Most points allowed in second quarter on road – 31, at New England Patriots, 10/26/2014
- Most points allowed in third quarter at home – 21, vs. Dallas Cowboys, 12/4/2014, vs. Green Bay Packers, 12/14/1969
- Most points allowed in third quarter on road – 24, at Dallas Cowboys, 12/27/1992
- Most points allowed in fourth quarter at home – 28, vs. Green Bay Packers, 11/6/1955
- Most points allowed in fourth quarter on road – 34, at Detroit Lions, 9/30/2007 (NFL Records)
- Most points scored by both teams in first quarter at home – 28, Bears (14) vs. Minnesota Vikings (14), 10/19/2008, Bears (14) vs. Detroit Lions (14), 11/24/1996, Bears (14) vs. Minnesota Vikings (14), 12/18/1966
- Most points scored by both teams in first quarter on road – 30, Bears (3) at Baltimore Colts (27), 10/4/1958, Bears (28) at Tennessee Titans (2), 11/4/2012
- Most points scored by both teams in second quarter at home – 35, Bears (28) vs. Tampa Bay Buccaneers (7), 9/26/1993, Bears (28) vs. Green Bay Packers (7), 12/7/1980, Bears (28) vs. New Orleans Saints (7), 10/10/1971
- Most points scored by both teams in second quarter on road – 45, Bears (24) at Green Bay Packers (21), 12/12/2021
- Most points scored by both teams in third quarter at home – 31, Bears (21) vs. New England Patriots (10), 11/10/2002, Bears (14) vs. Los Angeles Rams (17), 11/3/1986, Bears (24) vs. Minnesota Vikings (7), 12/17/1961
- Most points scored by both teams in third quarter on road – 31, Bears (24) at Minnesota Vikings (7), 9/19/1985
- Most points scored by both teams in fourth quarter at home – 42, Bears (14) vs. Green Bay Packers (28), 11/6/1955
- Most points scored by both teams in fourth quarter on road – 48, Bears (14) at Detroit Lions (34), 9/30/2007 (NFL Records)
- Most points scored by both teams in first half at home – 51, Bears (27) vs. Minnesota Vikings (24), 10/19/2008
- Most points scored by both teams in first half on road – 49, Bears (21) at San Francisco 49ers (28), 12/28/2025
- Most points scored by both teams in second half at home – 52, Bears (24) vs. Green Bay Packers (28), 11/6/1955
- Most points scored by both teams in second half on road – 55, Bears (42) at Washington Redskins (13), 10/26/1947
- Most points scored in a postseason game – 73, at Washington Redskins, 12/8/1940 (NFL Records)
- Most points allowed in a postseason game – 47, at New York Giants, 12/30/1956
- Largest winning margin in a postseason game – 73, Bears (73) at Washington Redskins (0), 12/8/1940 (NFL Records)
- Largest losing margin in a postseason game – 40, Bears (7) at New York Giants (47), 12/30/1956
- Most points scored by both teams in a postseason game – 73, Bears (73) at Washington Redskins (0), 12/8/1940
- Fewest points scored by both teams in a postseason game – 20, Bears (6) at Washington Redskins (14), 12/13/1942
- Biggest comeback in a postseason game – 18, vs. Green Bay Packers, 1/10/2026
- Biggest blown lead in a postseason game – 14, vs. Washington Redskins, 1/10/1988
- Most points scored in a first half postseason – 30, vs. Green Bay Packers, 12/14/1941
- Most points scored in a second half postseason – 45, at Washington Redskins, 12/8/1940 (NFL Records)
- Most points scored in a first quarter postseason – 21, at Washington Redskins, 12/8/1940
- Most points scored in a second quarter postseason – 24, vs. Green Bay Packers, 12/14/1941
- Most points scored in a third quarter postseason – 26, at Washington Redskins, 12/8/1940
- Most points scored in a fourth quarter postseason – 25, vs. Green Bay Packers, 1/10/2026
- Most points allowed in a first half postseason – 34, at New York Giants, 12/30/1956
- Most points allowed in a second half postseason – 27, at New York Giants, 12/9/1934
- Most points allowed in a first quarter postseason – 13, at New York Giants, 12/30/1956
- Most points allowed in a second quarter postseason – 23, at San Francisco 49ers, 1/7/1995
- Most points allowed in a third quarter postseason – 21, vs. Washington Redskins, 12/12/1937
- Most points allowed in a fourth quarter postseason – 27, at New York Giants, 12/9/1934 (NFL Records)
- Most points scored by both teams in a first quarter postseason – 21, Bears (14) at New York Giants (7), 12/15/1946, Bears (21) at Washington Redskins (0), 12/8/1940, Bears (14) vs. Washington Redskins (7), 12/12/1937
- Most points scored by both teams in a second quarter postseason – 28, Bears (7) at New York Giants (21), 12/30/1956, Bears (14) vs. Seattle Seahawks (14), 1/14/2007
- Most points scored by both teams in a third quarter postseason – 28, Bears (7) vs. Washington Redskins (21), 12/12/1937
- Most points scored by both teams in a fourth quarter postseason – 31, Bears (25) vs. Green Bay Packers (6), 1/10/2026
- Most points scored by both teams in a first half postseason – 41, Bears (7) at New York Giants (34), 12/30/1956
- Most points scored by both teams in a second half postseason – 45, Bears (45) at Washington Redskins (0), 12/8/1940
- Fewest points scored by both teams in a first half postseason – 7, Bears (7) vs. New York Giants (0), 1/5/1986
- Fewest points scored by both teams in a second half postseason – 6, Bears (3) vs. Philadelphia Eagles (3), 12/31/1988
- Most touchdowns scored in a game at home – 9, vs. San Francisco 49ers, 12/12/1965, vs. Green Bay Packers, 12/7/1980
- Most touchdowns scored in a game on road – 8, at New York Giants, 11/14/1943, at Washington Redskins, 10/26/1947, at Baltimore Colts, 11/25/1962
- Most touchdowns scored in one half at home – 6, vs. Washington Redskins, 11/28/1948 (1st half)
- Most touchdowns scored in one half on road – 7, at Philadelphia Eagles, 11/30/1941 (2nd half)
- Most touchdowns scored by both teams in a game at home – 12, Bears (9) vs. San Francisco 49ers (3), 12/12/1965, Bears (7) vs. Minnesota Vikings (5), 12/17/1961, Bears (8) vs. Baltimore Colts (4), 10/21/1956
- Most touchdowns scored by both teams in a game on road – 12, Bears (5) at Baltimore Colts (7), 10/4/1958
- Fewest touchdowns scored by both teams in a game at home since 1940 – 0, vs. Seattle Seahawks, 12/26/2024, vs. Tampa Bay Buccaneers, 12/29/2002, vs. Atlanta Falcons, 10/3/1993, vs. Green Bay Packers, 9/2/1979, vs. Los Angeles Rams, 11/10/1963, vs. Detroit Lions, 12/16/1962, vs. Detroit Lions, 12/10/1950
- Fewest touchdowns scored by both teams in a game on road since 1940 – 0, at Tampa Bay Buccaneers, 10/24/1999, at Los Angeles Raiders, 12/27/1987, at Denver Broncos, 12/5/1971, at Detroit Lions, 10/28/1962
- Most touchdowns scored by both teams in one half at home – 7, Bears (3) vs. Green Bay Packers (4), 11/6/1955 (2nd half), Bears (5) vs. Baltimore Colts (2), 10/21/1956 (2nd half), Bears (3) vs. Washington Redskins (4), 9/15/1968 (1st half)
- Most touchdowns scored by both teams in one half on road – 8, Bears (6) at Washington Redskins (2), 10/26/1947 (2nd half)
- Most touchdowns scored by both teams in one quarter at home – 6, Bears (2) vs. Green Bay Packers (4), 11/6/1955 (4th quarter)
- Most touchdowns scored by both teams in one quarter on road – 7, Bears (2) at Detroit Lions (5), 9/30/2007 (4th quarter)
- Most field goal scored in a game at home – 5, Roger LeClerc, vs. Detroit Lions, 12/3/1961
- Most field goal scored in a game on road – 5, Mac Percival, at Philadelphia Eagles, 10/20/1968
- Most field goal scored 50 or longer made in a game at home – 2, Kevin Butler (American football), vs. Minnesota Vikings, 9/23/1990, vs. Green Bay Packers, 10/7/1990
- Most field goal scored 50 or longer made in a game on road – 2, Paul Edinger, at Detroit Lions, 12/24/2000, Robbie Gould, at Oakland Raiders, 11/27/2011, Eddy Piñeiro, vs. Los Angeles Chargers, 10/27/2019, Cairo Santos, at Minnesota Vikings, 10/9/2022, at Arizona Cardinals, 11/3/2024, at Las Vegas Raiders, 9/28/2025
- Most field goal scored in one quarter at home – 3, Kevin Butler (American football), vs. Tampa Bay Buccaneers, 9/26/1993 (4th quarter) Jeff Jaeger, vs. Oakland Raiders, 9/29/1996 (4th quarter), Robbie Gould, vs. Green Bay Packers, 12/4/2005 (2nd quarter), vs. Philadelphia Eagles, 11/22/2009 (2nd quarter), Eddy Piñeiro, vs. Los Angeles Chargers, 10/27/2019 (2nd quarter)
- Most field goal scored in one quarter on road – 3, Mac Percival, at Green Bay Packers, 11/15/1970 (4th quarter), Paul Edinger, at Philadelphia Eagles, 10/22/2000 (4th quarter), Robbie Gould at Green Bay Packers, 9/10/2006 (2nd quarter), at Detroit Lions, 12/24/2006 (4th quarter), Cairo Santos, at Arizona Cardinals, 11/3/2024 (2nd quarter)
- Longest field goal in a game at home – 58, Robbie Gould vs. Cincinnati Bengals, 9/8/2013
- Longest field goal in a game on road – 57, Robbie Gould at Denver Broncos, 12/11/2011
- Most field goal allowed in a game at home – 5, Curt Knight, vs. Washington Redskins, 11/14/1971, Fred Cox, vs. Minnesota Vikings, 9/23/1973, Nick Lowery vs. Kansas City Chiefs, 12/29/1990, Martin Gramatica, vs. Tampa Bay Buccaneers, 12/29/2002, Sebastian Janikowski, vs. Oakland Raiders, 10/5/2003, Justin Medlock, vs. Carolina Panthers, 10/28/2012, Robbie Gould, vs. San Francisco 49ers, 12/3/2017
- Most field goal allowed in a game on road – 6, Sebastian Janikowski, at Oakland Raiders, 11/27/2011
- Most field goal allowed 50 or longer made in a game at home – 2, Greg Joseph, vs. Minnesota Vikings, 10/15/2023, Ka'imi Fairbairn, vs. Houston Texans, 9/15/2024
- Most field goal allowed 50 or longer made in a game on road – 2, Brett Conway, at Washington Redskins, 10/31/1999, Matt Prater, at Denver Broncos, 12/11/2011, Matt Bryant, at Atlanta Falcons, 10/12/2014, Adam Vinatieri, at Indianapolis Colts, 10/9/2016, Chase McLaughlin, at Cleveland Browns, 9/26/2021, Chris Boswell, at Pittsburgh Steelers, 11/8/2021
- Most field goal allowed in one quarter at home – 4, Sebastian Janikowski, vs. Oakland Raiders, 10/5/2003 (2nd quarter)
- Most field goal allowed in one quarter on road – 3, Jan Stenerud, at Kansas City Chiefs, 11/12/1973 (2nd quarter), Gary Anderson (placekicker), at Minnesota Vikings, 10/10/1999 (2nd quarter), Robbie Gould, at San Francisco 49ers, 12/23/2018, Chris Boswell, at Pittsburgh Steelers, 11/8/2021 (4th quarter)
- Longest field goal allowed in a game at home – 59, Matt Prater vs. Detroit Lions, 1/3/2016
- Longest field goal allowed in a game on road – 60, Morten Andersen at New Orleans Saints, 10/27/1991
- Most field goal scored by both teams in a game at home – 8, Bears (3) vs. Washington Redskins (5), 11/14/1971, Bears (3) vs. Oakland Raiders (5), 10/5/2003
- Most field goal scored by both teams in a game at home – 8, Bears (5) at Philadelphia Eagles, (3), 10/20/1968, Bears (2) at Oakland Raiders (6), 11/27/2011, Bears (3) at Indianapolis Colts (5), 10/9/2016, Bears (4) at Minnesota Vikings (4), 12/29/2019
- Most field goal scored by both teams in one quarter – 5, Bears (1) vs. Oakland Raiders (4), 10/5/2003 (2nd quarter)
- Fewest total yards in a game at home – 24, vs. Detroit Lions, 11/22/1981
- Fewest total yards in a game on road – 47, at Cleveland Browns, 9/26/2021
- Fewest total yards in one half – 4, at San Francisco 49ers, 12/8/2024 (1st half)
- Fewest total yards in one quarter – -22, vs. Detroit Lions, 11/22/1981 (4th quarter)
- Fewest total yards allowed in a game at home – 33, vs. Philadelphia Eagles, 10/25/1942
- Fewest total yards allowed in a game on road – 54, at Pittsburgh Steelers, 10/2/1939
- Fewest total yards allowed in one half – -19, at New England Patriots, 1/26/1986 (Super Bowl XX) (1st half)
- Fewest total yards allowed in one quarter – -20, at New England Patriots, 1/26/1986 (Super Bowl XX) (1st quarter)
- Fewest total yards by both teams in a game – 263, Bears (75) at Detroit Lions (188), 10/28/1962
- Fewest total yards by both teams in one half – 120, Bears (22) at New York Giants (98), 10/3/2010 (1st half)
- Fewest total yards by both teams in one quarter – 9, Bears (-1) at New York Giants (10), 10/3/2010 (2nd quarter)
- 200 rushing yards by a player in a game at home – Walter Payton vs. Minnesota Vikings, 11/20/1977, Matt Forte vs. Carolina Panthers, 10/2/2011
- 200 rushing yards by a player in a game on road – Gale Sayers at Green Bay Packers, 11/3/1968, Walter Payton at Green Bay Packers, 10/30/1977
- Most rushing yards by Walter Payton player in a game at home – 275, vs. Minnesota Vikings, 11/20/1977
- Most rushing yards by Walter Payton player in a game on road – 205, at Green Bay Packers, 10/30/1977
- Fewest rushing yards by Walter Payton player in a game at home – 0, vs. Baltimore Colts, 9/21/1975
- Fewest rushing yards by Walter Payton player in a game on road – 0, at Detroit Lions, 10/12/1975
- Most consecutive games started by a bears player – 170, Walter Payton from December 7, 1975 to September 20, 1987
- 4000 passing yards season by a bears quarterback – 0, No Chicago Bears quarterback has 4,000 passing yards season, the closest bears quarterback is Caleb Williams has 3,942 passing yards 2025 season

†-tied NFL record

== All-Time Series ==
This is a list of the all-time series record for the Chicago Bears against all current NFL franchises in competitive play and how they fared against defunct franchises. That includes all regular season and postseason matchups between 1920 and the 2026 season.

Team	Won	Lost	Tied	Win %	Last meeting(s)
Current franchises
Arizona Cardinals	60	30	6	.656	2024: Cardinals 29, Bears 9
Atlanta Falcons	17	14	0	.548	2026: Bears 31, Falcons 23
Baltimore Ravens	4	4	0	.500	2025: Ravens 30, Bears 16
Buffalo Bills	8	6	0	.571	2022: Bills 35, Bears 13
Carolina Panthers	10	4	0	.714	2026: Bears 59, Panthers 37
Cincinnati Bengals	7	6	0	.538	2025: Bears 47, Bengals 42
Cleveland Browns	8	11	0	.421	2025: Bears 31, Browns 3
Dallas Cowboys	13	16	0	.448	2025: Bears 31, Cowboys 14
Denver Broncos	8	9	0	.471	2023: Broncos 31, Bears 28
Detroit Lions	105	82	5	.560	2025: Lions 52, Bears 21; Lions 19, Bears 16
Green Bay Packers	98	110	6	.472	2026: Packers 31, Bears 7
Houston Texans	2	5	0	.286	2024: Texans 19, Bears 13
Indianapolis Colts	19	26	0	.422	2024: Colts 21, Bears 16
Jacksonville Jaguars	6	3	0	.667	2024: Bears 35, Jaguars 16
Kansas City Chiefs	7	7	0	.500	2023: Chiefs 41, Bears 10
Las Vegas Raiders	10	8	0	.556	2025: Bears 25, Raiders 24
Los Angeles Chargers	7	7	0	.500	2023: Chargers 30, Bears 13
Los Angeles Rams	55	40	3	.582	2025: Rams 20, Bears 17
Miami Dolphins	4	10	0	.286	2022: Dolphins 35, Bears 32
Minnesota Vikings	59	70	2	.458	2026: Vikings 9, Bears 3
New England Patriots	6	11	0	.353	2026: Bears 30, Patriots 24
New Orleans Saints	16	19	0	.457	2025: Bears 26, Saints 14
New York Giants	37	25	2	.594	2025: Bears 24, Giants 20
New York Jets	10	4	0	.714	2026: Bears 23, Jets 12
Philadelphia Eagles	32	17	1	.650	2026: Bears 27, Eagles 7
Pittsburgh Steelers	23	8	1	.734	2025: Bears 31, Steelers 28
San Francisco 49ers	33	37	1	.472	2025: 49ers 42, Bears 38
Seattle Seahawks	9	12	0	.429	2026: Bears 34, Seahawks 17
Tampa Bay Buccaneers	41	22	0	.651	2026: Bears 27, Buccaneers 24
Tennessee Titans	7	7	0	.500	2024: Bears 24, Titans 17
Washington Commanders	26	28	1	.482	2025: Bears 25, Commanders 24
Defunct franchises
Akron Pros/Indians	3	0	1	.875	
Boston Yanks	3	0	0	1.000	
Brooklyn Dodgers	10	0	1	.955	
Buffalo Bisons	4	2	0	.667	
Canton Bulldogs	2	2	0	.500	
Champaign Legion	1	0	0	1.000	
Chicago Tigers	2	0	0	1.000	
Cincinnati Reds	2	0	0	1.000	
Cleveland Bulldogs	2	1	0	.667	
Cleveland Indians	2	0	0	1.000	
Columbus Tigers	2	0	0	1.000	
Dallas Texans	1	1	0	.500	
Dayton Triangles	4	0	0	1.000	
Detroit Panthers	2	1	1	.625	
Detroit Tigers	1	0	0	1.000	
Detroit Wolverines	0	2	0	.000	
Duluth Eskimos	2	0	0	1.000	
Frankford Yellow Jackets	7	4	2	.615	
Hammond Pros	3	0	0	1.000	
Kewanee Walworths	1	0	0	1.000	
Louisville Colonels	1	0	0	1.000	
Milwaukee Badgers	3	0	1	.875	
Minneapolis Marines	3	0	0	1.000	
Minneapolis Red Jackets	3	0	0	1.000	
Moline Universal Tractors	1	0	0	1.000	
New York Yankees	2	1	0	.667	
New York Yanks	3	1	0	.750	
Oorang Indians	2	0	0	1.000	
Pottsville Maroons	3	0	0	1.000	
Providence Steam Roller	0	1	1	.250	
Racine Legion	2	0	2	.750	
Rochester Jeffersons	2	0	0	1.000	
Rock Island Independents	8	1	4	.769	
Rockford A.C.	1	0	0	1.000	
Staten Island Stapletons	1	0	1	.750	
Toledo Maroons	1	0	0	1.000	
Total*	744*	658	28	.529	Combined record versus current franchises
Total*	90	17	14	.802	Combined record versus defunct franchises
Total*	834*	675	42	.551	On bottom of page 416 of the 2020 Chicago Bears Media Guide (page 418 on PDF) it states: Note: *Three victories are subtracted from the listed overall victory total. The Eagles and Steelers (Steagles) merged in 1943 (1-0) and the Cardinals and Steelers (Card-Pitt) merged in 1944 (2-0). Games are officially recorded under both teams (though only counted once in the "TOTAL" line).
