= Joe Kapp =

American gridiron football player, coach, and executive (1938–2023)

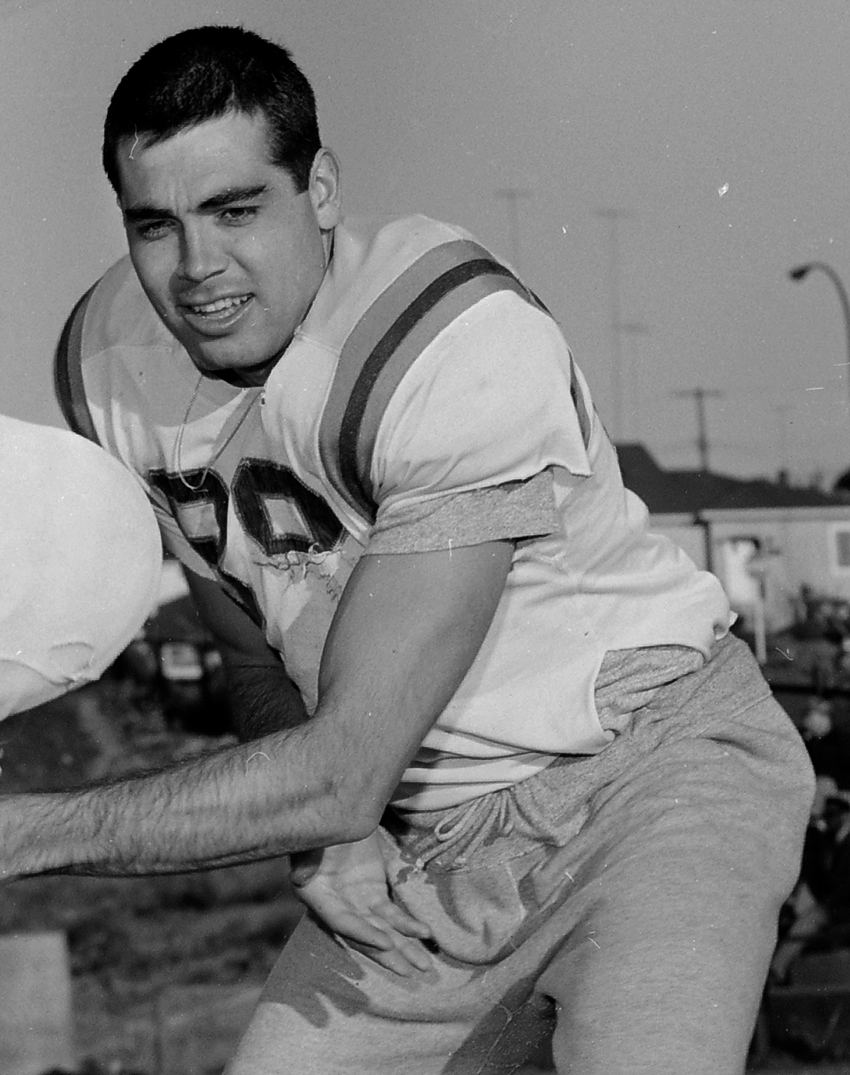
- Kapp in 1960

No. 82, 22, 11
- Position: Quarterback

Personal information
- Born: March 19, 1938; Santa Fe, New Mexico, U.S.
- Died: May 8, 2023 (aged 85); San Jose, California, U.S.
- Listed height: 6 ft 2 in (1.88 m)
- Listed weight: 215 lb (98 kg)

Career information
- High school: Hart (Santa Clarita, California)
- College: California (1956–1958)
- NFL draft: 1959: 18th round, 209th overall pick

Career history

Playing
- Washington Redskins (1959)*; Calgary Stampeders (1959–1960); BC Lions (1961–1966); Minnesota Vikings (1967–1969); Boston Patriots (1970)
- * Offseason or practice squad member only

Coaching
- California (1982–1986); Sacramento Attack (1992)

Operations
- BC Lions (1990) (GM)

Awards and highlights
- NFL: NFL champion (1969); Pro Bowl (1969); CFL: CFL Grey Cup champion (1964); Jeff Nicklin Memorial Trophy (1963); 2× CFL All-Star (1963, 1964); 2× CFL West-All-Star (1963, 1964); BC Lions No. 22 retired; Bob Bourne Memorial Trophy (1963); NCAA: First-team All-American (1958); Voit Trophy (1958); Pop Warner Trophy (1958); First-team All-PCC (1958); Second-team All-PCC (1957); NFL record: Most touchdown passes in a game: 7 (tied); As a coach: Pac-10 Coach of the Year (1982)

Career NFL statistics
- Passing attempts: 918
- Passing completions: 449
- Completion percentage: 48.9%
- TD–INT: 40–64
- Passing yards: 5,911
- Passer rating: 55.1
- Rushing yards: 611
- Rushing touchdowns: 5
- Stats at Pro Football Reference

Career CFL statistics
- TD–INT: 136–129
- Passing yards: 22,725
- Passing attempts: 2,709
- Passing completions: 1,476

Head coaching record
- Regular season: 20–34–1 (.370)
- Canadian Football Hall of Fame
- College Football Hall of Fame

Joseph Robert Garcia Kapp (March 19, 1938 – May 8, 2023) was an American football quarterback, coach, and executive who played professionally for 12 seasons. Kapp spent the majority of his career with the BC Lions of the Canadian Football League (CFL) and the Minnesota Vikings of the National Football League (NFL). He is the only quarterback to start in the Super Bowl, Rose Bowl, and Grey Cup.

Kapp played college football for the California Golden Bears, winning the Voit and Pop Warner trophies and earning first-team All-American honors in 1958 en route to an appearance in the 1959 Rose Bowl. He began his professional career with the Calgary Stampeders, where he spent two seasons before joining the Lions. During his six seasons with the Lions, he led the team to their first championship title in the 52nd Grey Cup while receiving the Jeff Nicklin Memorial Trophy and two All-Star selections. Kapp joined the Vikings in 1967, earning Pro Bowl honors two years later en route to a victory in the 1969 NFL Championship and the team's Super Bowl debut in Super Bowl IV. He signed with the Boston Patriots the following year, where he played his last season.

After retiring as a player, Kapp returned to the Golden Bears as head coach, serving from 1982 to 1986 and winning Pac-10 Coach of the Year in his first season. He later returned to the Lions as general manager in 1990. Kapp was inducted to the Canadian Football Hall of Fame in 1984 and the College Football Hall of Fame in 2004.

== Early life ==
Kapp was born in Santa Fe, New Mexico, to Florence García, of Mexican-American heritage, and Robert Kapp, of German descent. Kapp He was raised in California, in the San Fernando Valley and Salinas, where he played quarterback for Hart High School in Newhall, now a part of Santa Clarita.

Kapp played college football at the University of California, Berkeley, where he led the California Golden Bears to a Pacific Coast Conference championship in 1958 and the Rose Bowl, where they lost to Iowa. This remains California's most recent Rose Bowl appearance. Kapp was named an All-American, and was also awarded the W. J. Voit Memorial Trophy in 1958 as the outstanding football player on the Pacific Coast. A two-sport athlete and fraternity member of Kappa Alpha Order in college, he also played on the basketball team and was a member of the 1956–57 and 1957–58 squads that won the Pacific Coast Conference championships. He earned a bachelor's degree in physical education from the university in 1959. Kapp held the UC Berkeley record for most rushing yards by a quarterback until Chase Garbers broke it in 2021.

== Professional career ==
=== Canadian Football League ===
The Washington Redskins selected Kapp in the 18th round of the 1959 NFL draft, giving them his rights to play professional football in the United States. However, Washington never contacted him after the draft, so his only choice was to accept an offer from Jim Finks, the general manager of the Calgary Stampeders of the Canadian Football League (CFL).

Kapp joined the Stampeders for his rookie season in 1959. The following year, Kapp led Calgary to their second playoff appearance since the start of the modern era of Canadian football. The season was a difficult one due to a knee injury against the Toronto Argonauts early in the season, but did not miss any games, because he played heavily taped.

In 1961, the BC Lions, then the CFL's newest franchise, traded four starting players to the Calgary Stampeders for Kapp. The move paid off for the Lions when Kapp led the team to a Grey Cup appearance in 1963. The following season, Kapp led the Lions to their first Grey Cup victory in 1964. However, the Lions proved unable to defend their championship in 1965.

By that time, Kapp had developed a reputation as a tough player and a great leader. According to Randy Ambosie, Kapp loved to hit and when he took off on a run he tried to run over defenders, unlike most quarterbacks.

Before the 1967 CFL season, Kapp made the decision to return to the U.S. to play pro football. The AFL's Oakland Raiders, San Diego Chargers, and Houston Oilers heavily pursued him.

Kapp ended up signing with the NFL's Minnesota Vikings in a multi-player "trade" between the CFL and NFL teams, one of the very few transactions to ever occur between the two leagues.

The Minnesota Vikings in 1965 had drafted running back Jim Young out of Queen's University in Kingston, Ontario. He had spent the 1965 and 1966 seasons with the Vikings, but wanted to return to Canada. The BC Lions were very interested in acquiring Young, but the Toronto Argonauts had his CFL rights.

The Minnesota Vikings general manager was Jim Finks, who had brought Kapp to Canada in 1959, and their head coach was Bud Grant, who had faced Kapp while coaching the Winnipeg Blue Bombers. Both Finks and Grant thought Joe Kapp would be the best replacement for Fran Tarkenton, who had been traded to the New York Giants. To make this transaction possible, the BC Lions traded all-star defensive lineman Dick Fouts, and future Canadian Football Hall of Fame running back Bill Symons to Toronto for the CFL rights to future Canadian Football Hall of Fame wide receiver Jim Young. They then managed to get Kapp waived out of the CFL. The Vikings managed to waive Jim Young out of the NFL, which allowed the BC Lions to sign him. The expanding New Orleans Saints wanted Young and it took some work from Finks to keep them from claiming Young. Kapp, now waived from the CFL, was free to sign with the Vikings, who had previously claimed his NFL playing rights from Washington.

=== National Football League ===
In 1967, Kapp's first season in the NFL, he started 11 of 14 games for the Vikings, compiling an unusual record of 3 wins, 5 losses and 3 ties. Kapp completed only 47 percent of his pass attempts with 8 touchdowns and 17 interceptions. Kapp also scored two rushing touchdowns. Of note, the team was winless without Kapp starting at quarterback. The Green Bay Packers won the division (and the Super Bowl).

In 1968, Kapp led Minnesota to their first ever playoff appearance, losing to the favored Baltimore Colts, 24–14. The Colts were upset a few weeks later by the New York Jets in Super Bowl III.

Early in the 1969 season, Kapp tied an all-time record when he threw for seven touchdown passes against the defending NFL champion Colts on September 28. He is tied with seven other players (Sid Luckman, Adrian Burk, George Blanda, Y. A. Tittle, Nick Foles, Peyton Manning, and Drew Brees). Kapp led the Vikings to a 12–2 record, and a berth in Super Bowl IV after defeating the Los Angeles Rams 23–20 in the Western Conference championship game, and the Cleveland Browns 27–7 in the last non-Super Bowl NFL Championship game. However, he was unable to lead the team to victory in the Super Bowl, as the Vikings lost 23–7 to the Kansas City Chiefs. On July 20, 1970, Sports Illustrated dubbed Kapp "The Toughest Chicano" on the cover of its weekly magazine. He received the team MVP, but refused the team MVP award, saying, "There is no one most valuable Viking. There are 40 most valuable Vikings."

Prior to the 1969 season, the Vikings had exercised the option clause of his contract, so Kapp had played the entire season without a new contract. It was unusual for teams to use the team's option and not to offer a new contract prior to a season. This dispute made him a free agent for the 1970 season.

Despite Kapp being a Super Bowl quarterback, no team in the NFL made contact with him until after the start of the 1970 regular season, when the Boston Patriots (1–1) signed him on October 2 to a four-year contract, making him the highest paid player in the league. The Patriots gave up defensive back John Charles and a 1972 first-round draft pick (which was used to select linebacker Jeff Siemon) as compensation to the Vikings. His first appearance for Boston was on October 11 at Kansas City, relieving starter Mike Taliaferro in the third quarter of a 23–10 loss.

The Patriots of 1970 were a poor-performing team and the late-arriving Kapp played poorly himself that season, leading the team to the 26-team league's worst record at 2–12. When the year ended, Rozelle demanded that Kapp sign a standard player contract. After conferring with his lawyer and the NFL Players Association, Kapp refused to sign.

With the top pick in the 1971 NFL draft, the Patriots selected quarterback Jim Plunkett of Stanford, the winner of the Heisman Trophy. Kapp reported to the newly renamed New England Patriots' training camp in 1971, refused to sign a standard contract, and departed. The headlines in the Boston papers read "KAPP QUITS!". After this incident Kapp never played again; his 12-year career as a professional football player was over.

Kapp started an anti-trust lawsuit vs. the NFL, claiming the standard NFL contract was unconstitutional and a restraint of trade. He won the summary judgment after four years. The court had ruled that Kapp's trade was indeed restrained. It was two years later (April 1, 1976) in the trial for damages, that the jury decided that Kapp was not damaged.

Although Kapp was not awarded any damages, in 1977 the rules at issue in the Kapp case were later revised, a new system was instituted, and a multimillion-dollar settlement was made between the NFL and the NFL Players Association.

== Post-football playing career ==
=== Acting career ===
In the 1970s and early 1980s, Kapp appeared in several television programs as well as theatrical film titles. In most cases, the character roles were minor. Programs included Ironside, The Six Million Dollar Man, Adam-12, The Rookies, Emergency!, Police Woman, Captains and the Kings, and Medical Center. Movies included Climb An Angry Mountain (1972), The World's Greatest Athlete (1973), The Longest Yard (1974), Breakheart Pass (1975), Two-Minute Warning (1976), Smash-Up on Interstate 5 (1976), Semi-Tough (1977), The Frisco Kid (1979), and Off Sides (Pigs vs. Freaks) (1984).

=== California head coach ===
In 1982, Kapp was hired as the head football coach at his alma mater, the University of California, Berkeley. He had never coached before.

In December 1981, Kapp made a promise to the football team that he would not consume any of his favorite alcoholic beverage, tequila, until the Golden Bears reached the Rose Bowl, which they did not under Kapp; indeed, as of 2023, the Golden Bears have yet to return to the Rose Bowl – they were Pac-10 co-champions in 2004 but a loss to USC sent them to the Holiday Bowl instead (in a 1994 interview, Kapp stated that he had resorted to drinking rum instead).

Kapp had several philosophies while coaching at Cal. He called his special teams the "special forces." He told his players to play "One hundred percent for 60 minutes." He also wanted the players to have fun. On Sundays, he would have his players play a game of "garbazz", described as a mix of basketball and football where the only objective is to pass the ball downfield. There are no football rules such as offsides or forward passes.

In his first year as head coach in 1982, the Golden Bears improved from 2–9 the year before to 7–4, and he was voted the Pac-10 Conference Coach of the Year. The 1982 season concluded with The Play, the famous five-lateral kickoff return by Cal to score the winning touchdown on the final play of the Big Game against archrival Stanford.

During the 1986 season, the Bears lost to Boston College, defeated Washington State, then lost to San Jose State. Following an embarrassing 50–18 loss at Washington on October 4, Kapp expressed frustration unzipping his pants in front of the Seattle media. He was notified that he would be released after the Big Game, played in Berkeley. The Bears responded to the student section's pre-game chants of "Win one for the zipper" by beating the Gator Bowl-bound #16 Cardinal 17–11, which gave Kapp a 3–2 record in the Big Game. He was carried off the field by his players, amid chanting from the student section, "We want Kapp!"

=== General manager of the BC Lions ===
In an effort to recapture their past glory, the BC Lions of the Canadian Football League (CFL) hired Kapp as the team's new general manager in 1990. Kapp's tenure was marked by his tendency to recruit ex-NFL players such as Mark Gastineau whose best football days had passed. Kapp was fired eleven games into the Lions' schedule; his most valuable legacy was the signing of quarterback Doug Flutie, who would blossom into a star in the CFL during the 1990s.

=== Sacramento Attack head coach ===
In 1992, Kapp was named the head coach of the Arena Football League's Los Angeles Wings, but the franchise never came into existence in Los Angeles, and moved to Sacramento as the Sacramento Attack. The franchise went 4–6 under Kapp, losing in the first round of the playoffs to the Detroit Drive. After the season, the franchise moved to Miami, Florida.

=== Personal life ===
Kapp lived in Los Gatos, California, and made himself available as a guest speaker. He had a wife, four children, and eight grandchildren. He was one of the owners of Kapp's Pizza Bar & Grill in Mountain View, California, which contained memorabilia from his career and closed in 2015. His son, Will, followed in his footsteps as a fullback at UC Berkeley. In 2015, grandson Frank Kapp continued the Cal football tradition as a freshman tight end with the Golden Bears.

Kapp and fellow Canadian Football Hall of Fame player Angelo Mosca came to blows at a 2011 Canadian Football League Alumni luncheon. The source of the bad blood between Kapp and Mosca was a hit Mosca made on Kapp's teammate Willie Fleming in the 1963 Grey Cup game. The hit, which Kapp and many others considered dirty, forced Fleming out of the game. Mosca's Tiger-Cats defeated Kapp's Lions 21–10 for the 1963 championship.

==== Health and death ====
In February 2016, the San Jose Mercury News reported that Kapp was suffering from Alzheimer's disease. He died from complications of the disease at a care facility in San Jose, California, on May 8, 2023, at age 85.

== Head coaching record ==
=== College ===
Year	Team	Overall	Conference	Standing	Bowl/playoffs
California Golden Bears (Pacific-10 Conference) (1982–1986)
1982	California	7–4	4–4	6th	
1983	California	5–5–1	3–4–1	8th	
1984	California	2–9	1–8	10th	
1985	California	4–7	2–7	10th	
1986	California	2–9	2–7	9th	
California:		20–34–1	12–30–1		
Total:		20–34–1			

== Bibliography ==
- Olsen, Jack (October 19, 1970). "He Goes Where the Trouble Is. He is Joe Kapp, wandering quarterback, and last week he was in Kansas City, playing for the Boston Patriots, who are in deep trouble. Despite Kapp, the Pats lost, but wait until the new boy learns the system". Sports Illustrated.
