= Adrian Burk =

American football player (1927–2003)

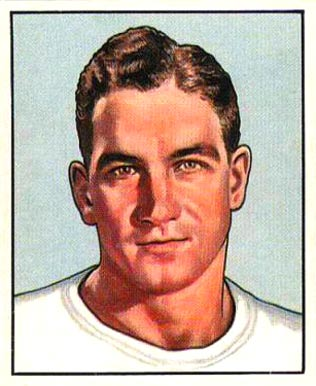
- Burk on a 1950 Bowman football card

No. 68, 10
- Positions: Quarterback, punter

Personal information
- Born: December 14, 1927; Mexia, Texas, U.S.
- Died: July 28, 2003 (aged 75); Henderson, Texas, U.S.
- Listed height: 6 ft 2 in (1.88 m)
- Listed weight: 190 lb (86 kg)

Career information
- High school: Gaston (Joinerville, Texas)
- College: Baylor
- NFL draft: 1950: 1st round, 2nd overall pick

Career history
- Baltimore Colts (1950); Philadelphia Eagles (1951–1956)

Awards and highlights
- 2× Pro Bowl (1954, 1955); NFL passing touchdowns leader (1954); NFL passer rating leader (1954); 2× NFL punting yards leader (1950, 1956); First-team All-SWC (1949); NFL record: Most touchdown passes in a game: 7 (tied)

Career NFL statistics
- Passing attempts: 1,079
- Passing completions: 500
- Completion percentage: 46.3%
- TD–INT: 61–89
- Passing yards: 7,001
- Passer rating: 52.2
- Punting yards: 19,365
- Punting average: 40.9
- Stats at Pro Football Reference

Adrian Matthew Burk (December 14, 1927 – July 28, 2003) was an American professional football player who was a quarterback and punter in the National Football League (NFL) for the Baltimore Colts and the Philadelphia Eagles. He played college football for the Baylor Bears. After his playing career, he served as an official.

== Playing career ==
Burk played college football at Baylor University and was selected in the first round of the 1950 NFL draft. Burk started his career with the doomed Baltimore Colts in 1950. In a quarterback room with Y. A. Tittle, Burk started five games and threw six touchdowns to 12 interceptions as the Colts lost each of his starts on their way to an 1-11 season. The team folded after the year ended and Burk ended up with the Philadelphia Eagles. He started 12 games in 1951 for the Eagles, throwing for 1,329 yards with 14 touchdowns to a league-leading 23 interceptions.

The Eagles traded for Bobby Thomason in 1952, and Burk would share time with him as the starting quarterback. Burk started just seven combined games in his next two years. He was named the starter in the 1954 season and started eight games. On October 17, 1954 against the Washington Redskins, Burk became part of history. In a 49–21 victory, he threw for seven touchdowns while passing 19-of-27 for 242 yards (none of his touchdown passes went longer than 26 yards), three of his touchdown passes were to Eagles end Pete Pihos. At the time, only Sid Luckman had passed for seven touchdown passes in one regular season game (six quarterbacks have subsequently tied the record in George Blanda, Joe Kapp, Y. A. Tittle, Peyton Manning, Nick Foles, and Drew Brees).

He threw for 1,740 yards with 23 touchdowns (which led the league) and 17 interceptions while leading the league in passer rating at 80.4, the only time his passer rating was above 60.0 and made the Pro Bowl. He started eight games of the 1955 season and threw for 1,359 yards with 9 touchdowns to 17 interceptions while being named a Pro Bowler again. He made just two starts in 1956. Burk elected to retire after the 1956 season to attend Baylor Law School. After graduating, he became general counsel to the Houston Oilers.

== Officiating career ==
Burk later worked as an NFL official as a back judge (now field judge), wearing uniform number 63. He worked the game that saw Joe Kapp of the Minnesota Vikings tie his record for seven touchdown passes in one game in 1969 vs. the Baltimore Colts. Burk was also the back judge in the famous 1972 playoff game between the Oakland Raiders and the Pittsburgh Steelers. That game, played in Pittsburgh, featured the play that came to be called the "Immaculate Reception". From his position as back judge, Burk was the first of the officials to signal a touchdown.

During a 1973 game between the Chicago Bears and Denver Broncos, Bears coach Abe Gibron can be heard chewing out Burk throughout the contest. Gibron had a microphone on him for the game by NFL Films, and the footage was released by NFL Films Executive Director Steve Sabol in 2001.

In his later years, Burk and his wife did volunteer missionary work with the Luther Rice Home in Northborough, Massachusetts.
