= List of NFL quarterbacks with seven touchdown passes in a game =

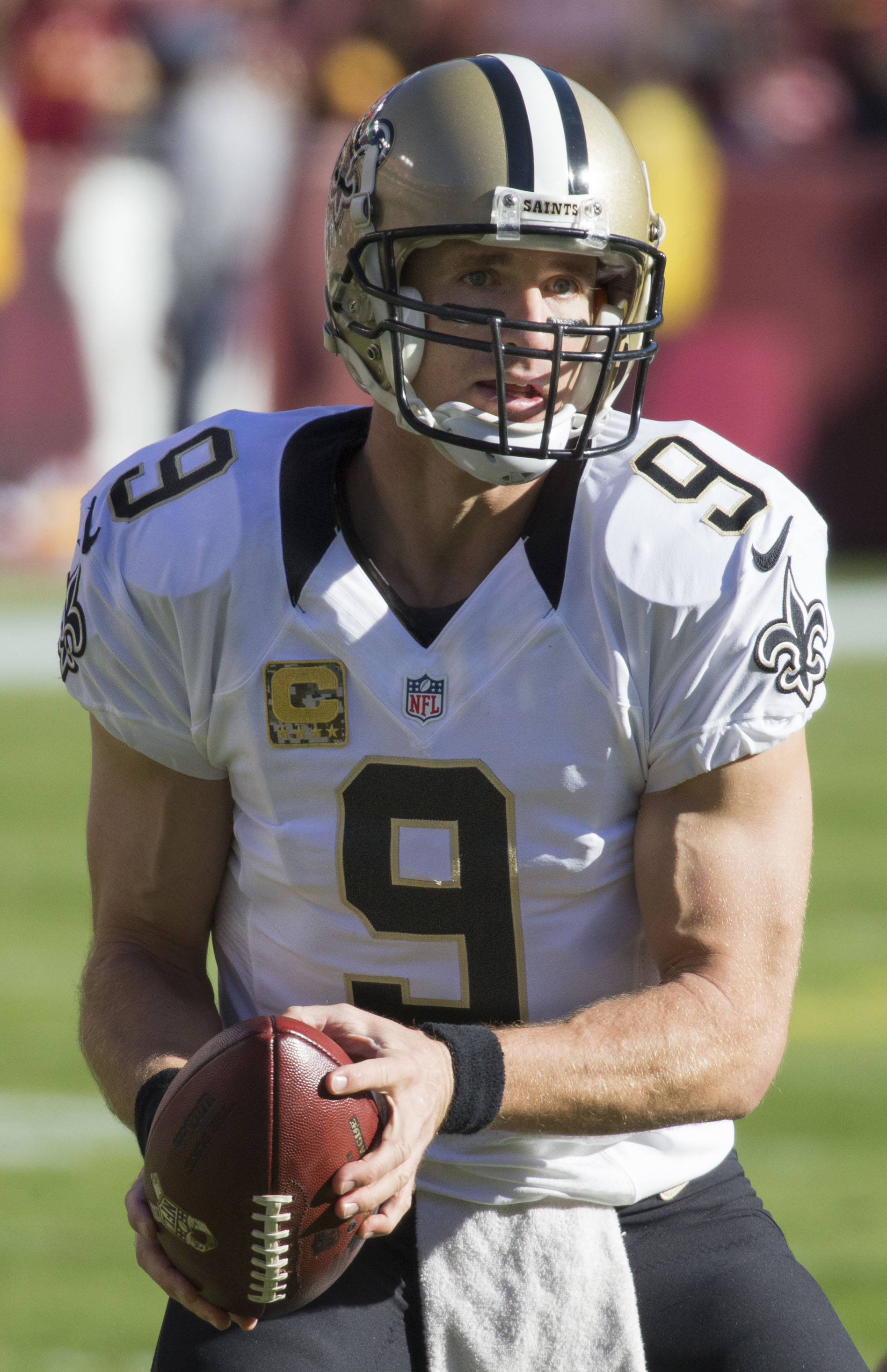
Drew Brees is the most recent quarterback to throw seven touchdown passes in a game.

In the National Football League (NFL), eight quarterbacks share the record of having thrown seven touchdown passes in a single game. Sid Luckman was the first player to accomplish the feat, doing so on November 14, 1943, while playing for the Chicago Bears. The most recent seven-touchdown game occurred on November 1, 2015, when Drew Brees did so with the New Orleans Saints. During that game the two teams' quarterbacks combined for 13 passing touchdowns, setting another NFL record. Five quarterbacks on the list are in the Pro Football Hall of Fame: Luckman, George Blanda, Y. A. Tittle, Peyton Manning, and Brees. There was a 44-year gap between seven-touchdown games from Joe Kapp's in 1969 until 2013, when Peyton Manning and Nick Foles each did so just two months apart. Manning also holds the NFL record for touchdown passes in a season, with 55.

No.	Player	Date	Team	Opponent	Result	Ref
1	Sid Luckman	November 14, 1943	Chicago Bears	New York Giants	W, 56–7	
2	Adrian Burk	October 17, 1954	Philadelphia Eagles	Washington Redskins	W, 49–21	
3	George Blanda	November 19, 1961	Houston Oilers	New York Titans	W, 49–13	
4	Y. A. Tittle	October 28, 1962	New York Giants	Washington Redskins	W, 49–34	
5	Joe Kapp	September 28, 1969	Minnesota Vikings	Baltimore Colts	W, 52–14	
6	Peyton Manning	September 5, 2013	Denver Broncos	Baltimore Ravens	W, 49–27	
7	Nick Foles	November 3, 2013	Philadelphia Eagles	Oakland Raiders	W, 49–20	
8	Drew Brees	November 1, 2015	New Orleans Saints	New York Giants	W, 52–49	

== See also ==
- List of NFL season passing touchdowns leaders
- List of NFL career passing touchdowns leaders
- List of NFL quarterbacks who have posted a perfect passer rating
- List of NFL quarterbacks who have passed for 500 or more yards in a game
- List of Major League Baseball hitters with four home runs in a game
