= List of 500-yard passing games in the NFL =

In the history of the National Football League (NFL), 22 different quarterbacks have passed for at least 500 yards in a single game 27 times, a feat also referred to as the "500 Club".

== History ==
Norm Van Brocklin was the first to do so, whose 554-yard performance in a 1951 game remains the league record for most passing yards in a game.

Only three quarterbacks have thrown for over 500 yards more than once in their career; Drew Brees and Tom Brady did so twice (both of Brees' 500-yard games occurred in regular season games, while Brady had one 500-yard game each in both a regular season game and a postseason game), and Ben Roethlisberger did so four times (three times in the regular season and once in the postseason). Kirk Cousins became the latest member of the club, after a 509-yard performance on October 3, 2024 against Tampa Bay. No quarterback has thrown for 600 yards in a league game during regulation, but Tom Brady was the first player to total 600 or more yards passing over four consecutive quarters. If counting interception return yards, then Jameis Winston holds the league record with a 668-yard game (497 passing + 171 return yards).

Brady and Roethlisberger are the only quarterbacks to have thrown for over 500 yards in a postseason game during the modern era; Brady did so in a Super Bowl LII loss to the Philadelphia Eagles during the 2017–18 playoffs while Roethlisberger did so in a Wild Card round loss to the Cleveland Browns during the 2020–21 NFL playoffs. Quarterbacks throwing for 500 yards have amassed 15 wins and 12 losses while doing so. Over time, the frequency of quarterbacks throwing for 500 or more yards in a game has increased, with 17 of 27 such performances occurring since 2010.

== List ==
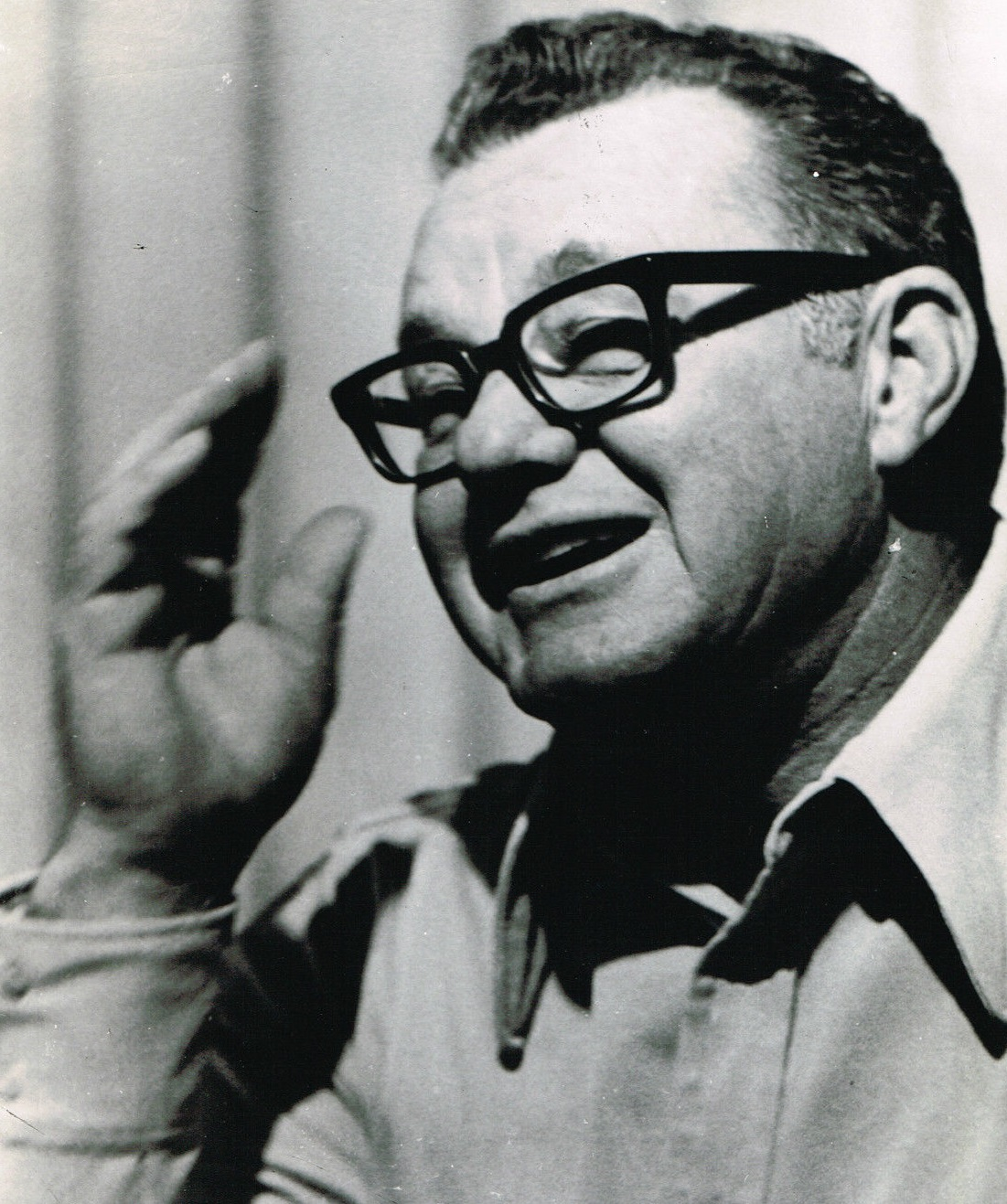
Norm Van Brocklin threw for an NFL record 554 yards in a 1951 game.

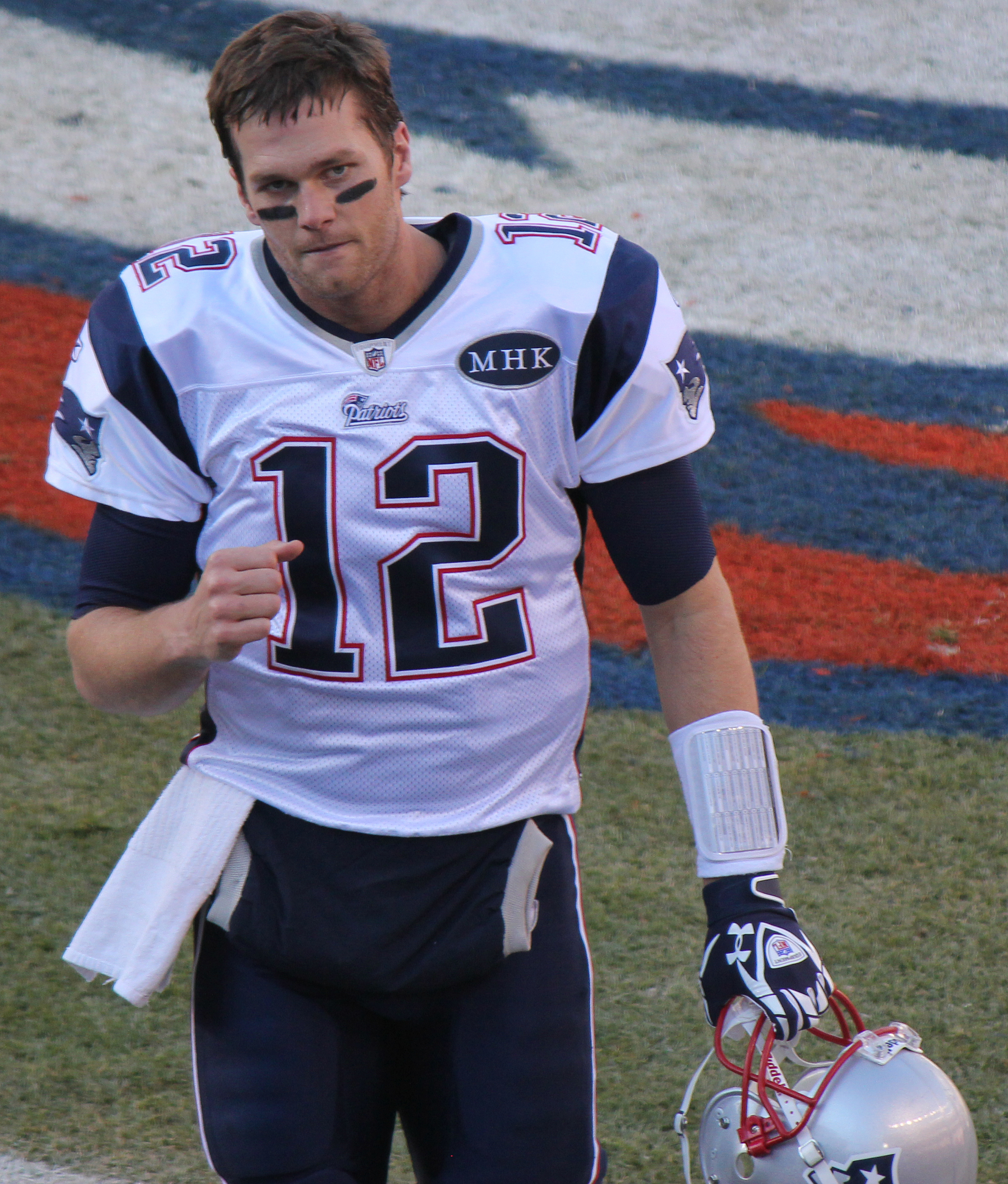
Tom Brady threw for 505 yards in Super Bowl LII, the most in NFL playoff history.

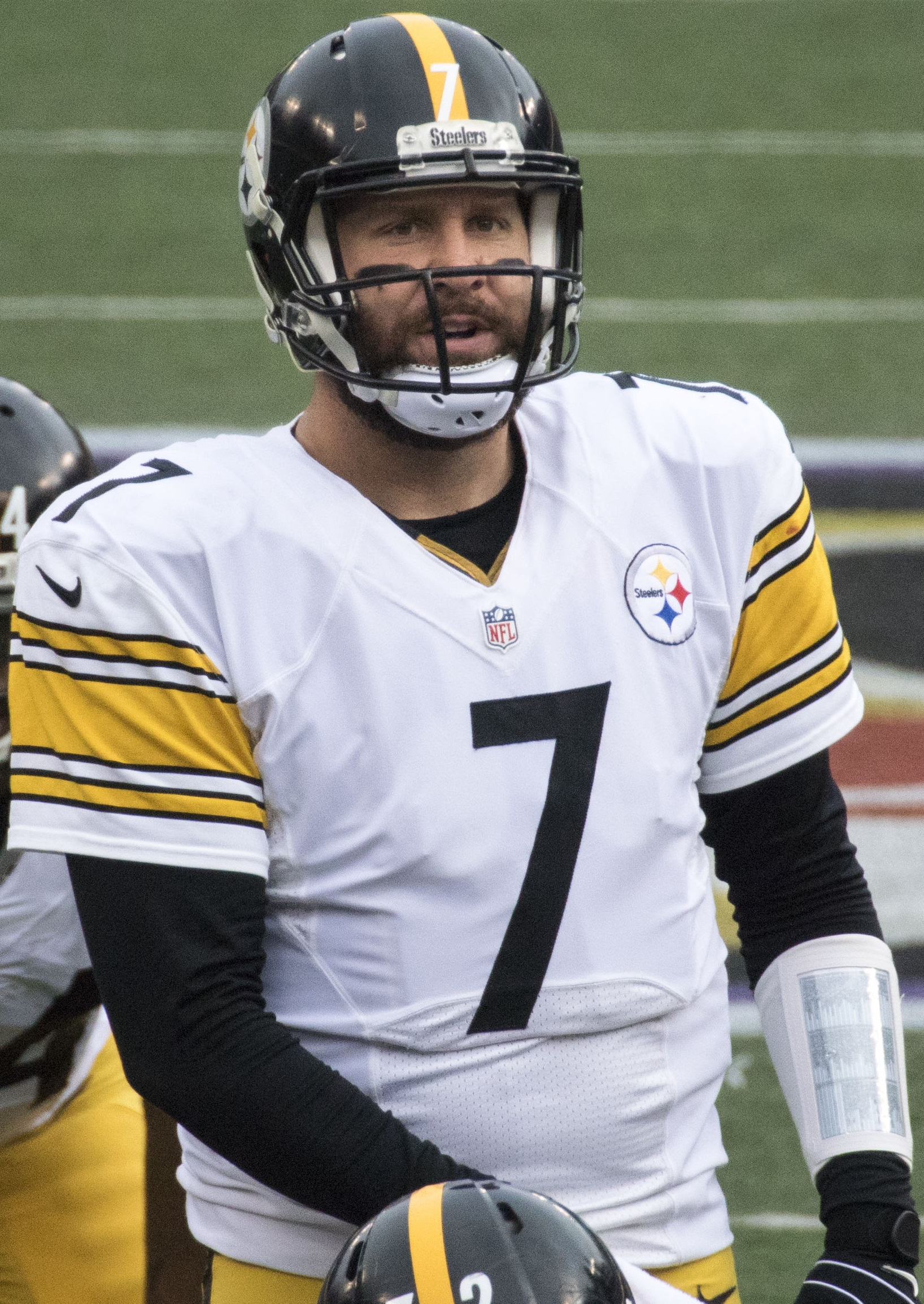
Ben Roethlisberger has thrown for at least 500 yards an NFL-record four times.

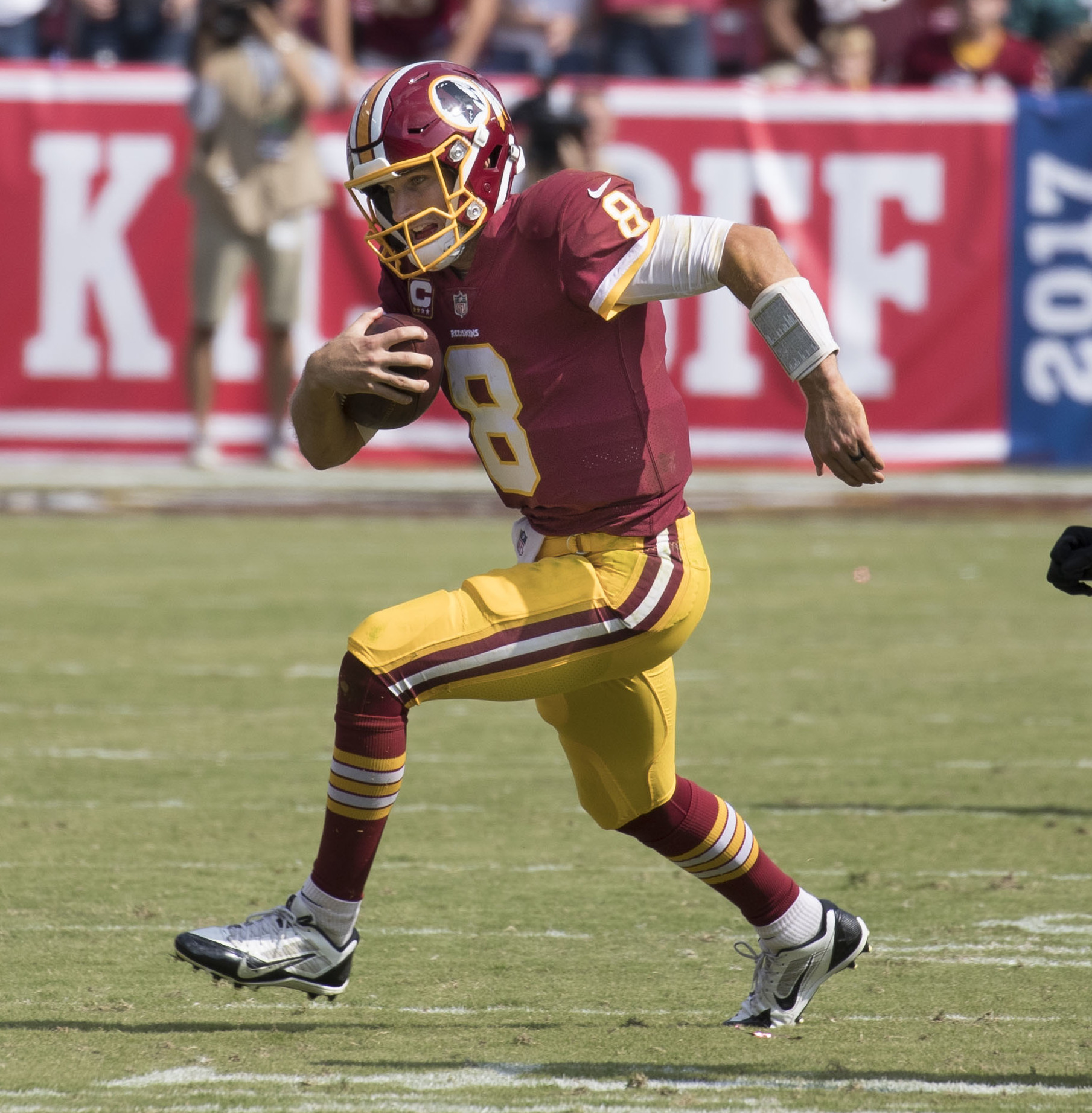
Kirk Cousins is the most recent quarterback to throw for 500 yards in a game.

Playoff performance

No.	Quarterback	Date	Team	Opponent	Result	Comp.	Att.	Comp. %	Yards	Y/A	TDs	INTs	Passer rating	Ref.
1	Norm Van Brocklin	September 28, 1951	Los Angeles Rams	New York Yanks	W 54–14	27	41	65.9	554	13.51	5	2	128.3	
2	Y. A. Tittle	October 28, 1962	New York Giants	Washington Redskins	W 49–34	27	39	69.2	505	12.94	7	0	151.4	
3	Vince Ferragamo	December 26, 1982	Los Angeles Rams	Chicago Bears	L 34–26	30	46	65.2	509	11.07	3	2	106.2	
4	Phil Simms	October 13, 1985	New York Giants	Cincinnati Bengals	L 35–30	40	62	64.5	513	8.27	1	2	82.3	
5	Dan Marino	October 23, 1988	Miami Dolphins	New York Jets	L 44–30	35	60	58.3	521	8.68	3	5	68.8	
6	Warren Moon	December 16, 1990	Houston Oilers	Kansas City Chiefs	W 27–10	27	45	60.0	527	11.71	3	0	123.1	
7	Boomer Esiason	November 10, 1996	Arizona Cardinals	Washington Redskins	W 37–34 (OT)	35	59	59.3	522	8.85	3	4	77.1	
8	Elvis Grbac	November 5, 2000	Kansas City Chiefs	Oakland Raiders	L 49–31	39	53	73.6	504	9.51	2	2	99.9	
9	Drew Brees	November 19, 2006	New Orleans Saints	Cincinnati Bengals	L 31–16	37	52	71.2	510	9.81	2	3	91.0	
10	Ben Roethlisberger	December 20, 2009	Pittsburgh Steelers	Green Bay Packers	W 37–36	29	46	63.0	503	10.93	3	0	121.9	
11	Tom Brady	September 12, 2011	New England Patriots	Miami Dolphins	W 38–24	32	48	66.7	517	10.77	4	1	121.6	
12	Matthew Stafford	January 1, 2012	Detroit Lions	Green Bay Packers	L 45–41	36	59	61.0	520	8.81	5	2	103.8	
13	Eli Manning	September 16, 2012	New York Giants	Tampa Bay Buccaneers	W 41–34	31	51	60.8	510	10.00	3	3	89.5	
14	Matt Schaub	November 18, 2012	Houston Texans	Jacksonville Jaguars	W 43–37 (OT)	43	55	78.2	527	9.58	5	2	121.7	
15	Tony Romo	October 6, 2013	Dallas Cowboys	Denver Broncos	L 51–48	25	36	69.4	506	14.06	5	1	140.0	
16	Ben Roethlisberger (2)	October 26, 2014	Pittsburgh Steelers	Indianapolis Colts	W 51–34	40	49	81.6	522	10.65	6	0	150.6	
17	Philip Rivers	October 18, 2015	San Diego Chargers	Green Bay Packers	L 27–20	43	65	66.2	503	7.74	2	0	99.7	
18	Drew Brees (2)	November 1, 2015	New Orleans Saints	New York Giants	W 52–49	39	50	78.0	505	10.10	7	2	131.7	
19	Matt Ryan	October 2, 2016	Atlanta Falcons	Carolina Panthers	W 48–33	28	37	75.7	503	13.59	4	1	142.0	
20	Derek Carr	October 30, 2016	Oakland Raiders	Tampa Bay Buccaneers	W 30–24 (OT)	40	59	67.8	513	8.69	4	0	117.4	
21	Ben Roethlisberger (3)	December 10, 2017	Pittsburgh Steelers	Baltimore Ravens	W 39–38	44	66	66.7	506	7.67	2	0	99.7	
22	Tom Brady (2)	February 4, 2018	New England Patriots	Philadelphia Eagles	L 41–33	28	48	58.3	505	10.52	3	0	115.4	
23	Jared Goff	September 29, 2019	Los Angeles Rams	Tampa Bay Buccaneers	L 55–40	45	68	66.2	517	7.60	2	3	80.3	
24	Dak Prescott	October 4, 2020	Dallas Cowboys	Cleveland Browns	L 49–38	41	58	70.6	502	8.7	4	1	112.9	
25	Ben Roethlisberger (4)	January 10, 2021	Pittsburgh Steelers	Cleveland Browns	L 48–37	47	68	69.1	501	7.4	4	4	85.5	
26	Joe Burrow	December 26, 2021	Cincinnati Bengals	Baltimore Ravens	W 41–21	37	46	80.4	525	11.4	4	0	143.2	
27	Kirk Cousins	October 3, 2024	Atlanta Falcons	Tampa Bay Buccaneers	W 36–30 (OT)	42	58	72.4	509	8.8	4	1	114.8	
No.	Quarterback	Date	Team	Opponent	Result	Comp.	Att.	Comp. %	Yards	Y/A	TDs	INTs	Passer rating	Ref.

=== Most 500 yard passing games ===
Count	Player	Seasons	Team(s)
4	Ben Roethlisberger	2009, 2014, 2017, 2020	Pittsburgh Steelers
2	Tom Brady	2011, 2017	New England Patriots
2	Drew Brees	2006, 2015	New Orleans Saints

== See also ==
- List of NFL quarterbacks with seven touchdown passes in a game
- List of NFL quarterbacks who have posted a perfect passer rating
- List of NFL quarterbacks who have posted a passer rating of zero
