= Dave Finzer =

American football player (born 1959)

No. 15
- Position: Punter

Personal information
- Born: February 3, 1959 (age 67); Chicago, Illinois, U.S.
- Listed height: 6 ft 0 in (1.83 m)
- Listed weight: 185 lb (84 kg)

Career information
- High school: Loyola Academy (Wilmette, Illinois)
- College: DePauw
- NFL draft: 1982: undrafted

Career history
- Dallas Cowboys (1982)*; Chicago Bears (1982)*; San Diego Chargers (1984)*; Chicago Bears (1984); Seattle Seahawks (1985)
- * Offseason or practice squad member only

Career NFL statistics
- Punts: 151
- Punt yards: 6,094
- Longest punt: 87
- Stats at Pro Football Reference

Dave Finzer is an American former professional football player who was a punter for two seasons with the Chicago Bears and Seattle Seahawks of the National Football League (NFL). He played college football for the Illinois Fighting Illini and DePauw Tigers. He led the NFL in punts inside the 20-yard line with 26 in 1984.

== Early life ==
He graduated from Loyola Academy in 1978.

== College career ==
Finzer began his college career at the University of Illinois Urbana-Champaign , where he currently is tied for the fourth longest kick in Fighting Illini history. He then transferred to Division III DePauw University in Indiana, where he continued to kick and punt. He graduated in 1982.

== Professional career ==
In 1982, Finzer was a member of the Dallas Cowboys training camp, but did not make the team. The next season, the Chicago Bears signed him as a free agent, but he was cut once again. Finzer joined the San Diego Chargers for the 1984 preseason, before being traded to the Bears in exchange for a draft pick. He played in all 16 games for the Bears, as well as two playoff games. Against the New Orleans Saints, Finzer had a 87 yard punt, which at the top was the 5th longest in NFL history and 2nd longest in Bears history. Finzer was cut by the Bears at the end of the season for the same player that beat him out on the Chargers, Maury Buford. He then joined the Seattle Seahawks for the 1985 season, where he played in 12 games.

== Personal life ==
After Dave’s playing days, he went on to work for family business, Finzer Roller, the largest manufacturing of rollers in the United States.
