= Sid Luckman =

American football player (1916–1998)

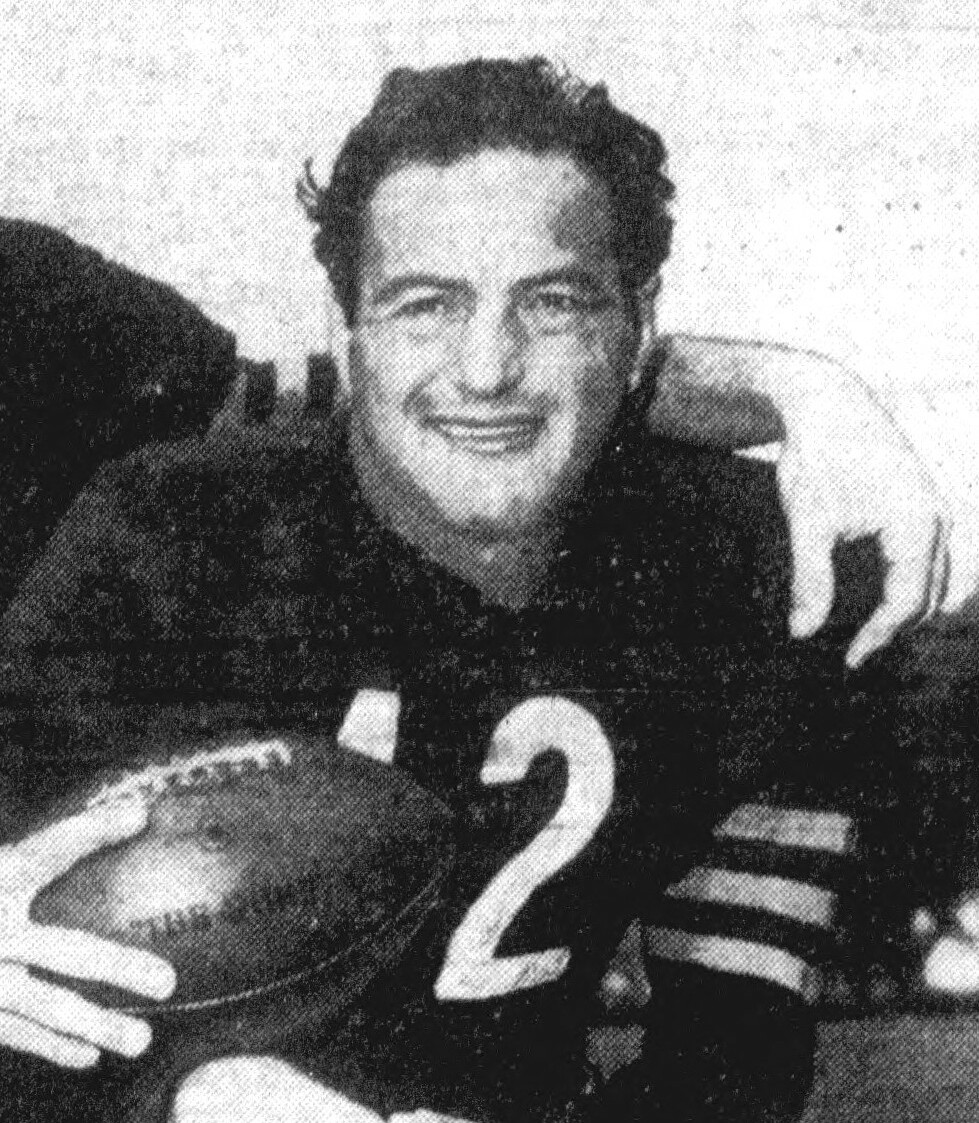
- Luckman, circa 1950

No. 42
- Positions: Quarterback, safety

Personal information
- Born: November 21, 1916; Brooklyn, New York, U.S.
- Died: July 5, 1998 (aged 81); Aventura, Florida, U.S.
- Listed height: 6 ft 0 in (1.83 m)
- Listed weight: 197 lb (89 kg)

Career information
- High school: Erasmus Hall (Brooklyn)
- College: Columbia (1936–1938)
- NFL draft: 1939: 1st round, 2nd overall pick

Career history

Playing
- Chicago Bears (1939–1950); → Newark Bears (1939)

Coaching
- Chicago Bears (1954–1969) Quarterbacks coach

Operations
- Chicago Bears (1951–1953) Vice president

Awards and highlights
- As a player: 4× NFL champion (1940, 1941, 1943, 1946); NFL Most Valuable Player (1943); 6× First-team All-Pro (1940–1944, 1947); Second-team All-Pro (1946); 3× Pro Bowl (1940–1942); 3× NFL passing yards leader (1943, 1945, 1946); 3× NFL passing touchdowns leader (1943, 1945, 1946); 3× NFL passer rating leader (1941, 1943, 1946); NFL completion percentage leader (1941); NFL 1940s All-Decade Team; Chicago Bears No. 42 retired; 100 greatest Bears of All-Time; American Association champion (1939); First-team All-American (1938); Second-team All-American (1937); 2× First-team All-Eastern (1937, 1938); As a coach: NFL champion (1963); NFL records: Highest single-season passing touchdown percentage (Note: To qualify for this record, the player must have met the following thresholds depending on the season in question: minimum 10 pass attempts per team game prior to 1976; minimum 12 pass attempts per team game in 1976 or 1977; minimum 14 pass attempts per team game since 1978.): 13.9% (1943); Highest career passing touchdown percentage: 7.9%; Highest single-season yards per attempt (Note: To qualify for this record, the player must have met the following thresholds depending on the season in question: minimum 10 pass attempts per team game prior to 1976; minimum 12 pass attempts per team game in 1976 or 1977; minimum 14 pass attempts per team game since 1978.): 10.9 (1943); Most touchdown passes in a game: 7 (tied)

Career NFL statistics
- Passing attempts: 1,744
- Passing completions: 904
- Completion percentage: 51.8%
- TD–INT: 137–132
- Passing yards: 14,686
- Passer rating: 75.0
- Military career
- Allegiance: United States
- Branch: United States Maritime Service
- Service years: 1943–1946
- Rank: Ensign
- Conflicts: World War II
- Stats at Pro Football Reference
- Pro Football Hall of Fame
- College Football Hall of Fame

Sidney Luckman (November 21, 1916 – July 5, 1998) was an American professional football player. During his 12 seasons as a quarterback with the Chicago Bears of the National Football League (NFL), he led them to four NFL championships in 1940, 1941, 1943, and 1946. He also played safety on defense for most of his career.

Sportswriter Ira Berkow wrote that Luckman was "the first great T-formation quarterback", and he is considered the greatest long-range passer of his time. He was named the NFL's Most Valuable Player in 1943, when he became the first quarterback to throw for more than 2,000 yards in a season and the first to throw 25 touchdown passes. Luckman was also a 3× NFL All-Star (1940–1942), 6× First-team All-Pro (1940–1944, 1947), Second-team All-Pro (1946), 3× NFL passing yards leader (1943, 1945, and 1946), 3× NFL passing touchdowns leader (1943, 1945, and 1946), NFL completion percentage leader (1941), 3× NFL passer rating leader (1941, 1943, and 1946), named to the NFL 1940s All-Decade team, had his No. 42 retired by the Bears, and tied the NFL record of 7 touchdown passes in a game. To date, Luckman still holds the all-time NFL record for touchdown percentage, (Note: Sometimes expressed as touchdowns per passing attempt.) at 7.9 percent.

Luckman was inducted into the Pro Football Hall of Fame in 1965, and in 1988 he was declared a joint winner of the Walter Camp Distinguished American Award. In 2020, ESPN included him on its list of the 150 greatest college football players of all time. Following his retirement from playing, Luckman continued his association with football by tutoring college coaches, focusing on the passing aspect of the game.

== Early life ==
Luckman was born in Brooklyn, New York, to Jewish immigrants from Germany, Meyer and Ethel Druckman Luckman. His father sparked his interest in football at age eight, by giving him a football to play with. He and his parents lived first in Williamsburg, Brooklyn, and then in a residence near Prospect Park in Flatbush, in Brooklyn, and it was here as a youngster that Sid first started throwing a football.

He played both baseball and football for Erasmus Hall High School, with his football skills impressing recruiters from about 40 colleges. Playing quarterback, he led the Erasmus Hall High School football team to two all-city championships.

Luckman chose Columbia University after meeting Lions coach Lou Little during a Columbia/Navy game at the university's Baker Field athletic facility. Luckman was not admitted to Columbia College; instead, he attended the New College for the Education of Teachers, an undergraduate school which was within Teachers College at Columbia. He competed on the football team from 1936 until the New College closed in 1939, at which point he transferred to Columbia College. Coach Little had a problem getting good high school athletes because of the entrance requirements at Columbia, and Columbia didn't have any physical education undergraduate program so when New College was started, Lou Little was happy because they had a P. E. Department. In fact, the 1936 varsity football squad had five other New College students; Hubert Schulze, Edward Stanzyk, Oscar Bonom, Harry Ream, and Antoni Mareski.

At Columbia, Luckman was a member of the Zeta Beta Tau fraternity. Wanting to remain at Columbia and stay close to his family, he supported himself by working various jobs around campus, including as a dishwasher, babysitter, and messenger. On the football team, Luckman was a versatile two-way player, playing quarterback and defensive back while also handling punting, field goals, extra points, and kick and punt returns. Over his collegiate career, he completed 180 of 376 passes for 2,413 yards and 20 touchdowns and rushed for nine additional touchdowns. A two-time All-American, Luckman finished third in the 1938 Heisman Trophy voting behind Davey O'Brien and Marshall Goldberg.

== Chicago Bears ==
=== Draft ===
Hearing of Sid Luckman's exploits as a single-wing tailback at Columbia University, Chicago Bears owner and coach George Halas believed Luckman had the ability to become an effective T-formation quarterback, and traveled to New York to watch him play. Halas then convinced the Pittsburgh Pirates (later the Steelers) to draft Luckman second overall and then trade him to the Bears, because he was interested in using Luckman's skills to help him restructure the offensive side of the game. However, despite his successes at Columbia University, Luckman initially declined any further interest in pro football, instead preferring to work for his father-in-law's trucking company. Halas went to work on convincing him otherwise. After gaining an invitation to Luckman's tiny apartment for a dinner which Luckman's wife Estelle prepared, Halas produced a contract for $5,500 ($125,800 today), which Luckman immediately signed. At that time both at the college and pro levels, offenses were a drab scrum of running the ball with only occasional passes. In what was then the predominant single-wing formation, the quarterback was primarily a blocking back and rarely touched the ball. Most passing was done by the tailback, and then usually only on third down with long yardage to go. Halas and his coaches, primarily Clark Shaughnessy, invented a rather complex scheme building on the traditional T-formation, but needed the right quarterback to run it properly.

Upon starting with Halas, Luckman mastered an offense that revolutionized football and became the basis of most modern professional offenses. Eventually, Luckman tutored college coaches across the Big Ten, Notre Dame and West Point in the intricacies of the passing game.

After Chicago's 1939 season had ended, the Bears sent Luckman to play for their farm team, the Newark Bears of the American Association. On December 10, 1939, Luckman played in Newark's 13–6 playoff victory over the Wilmington Clippers. There was controversy after the game as to whether Luckman should have been allowed to play.

=== T-formation ===
A common type of T-formation

In 1940, during his second season with the Chicago Bears, Luckman took over the offense and led the Bears to the title game against Sammy Baugh and the Washington Redskins. The Redskins had beaten the Bears, 7–3, during the regular season. Using the "man-in-motion" innovation to great advantage, the Bears destroyed the Redskins, 73–0, in a game stated to be "the most one-sided game in the history of the sport". Luckman passed only six times, with four completions and 102 yards in the rout.

From 1940 to 1946, the Bears displayed their dominance in the game, playing in five NFL championship games, winning four, and posted a 54–17–3 regular-season record. In 1942, the Bears posted a perfect 11–0 record and outscored their opponents, 376–84, however, they lost the championship game to the Redskins. Although the T-formation had been used many years before Luckman joined the Chicago Bears, he was central to Chicago's successful use of this style of play because of his game-sense and versatility. Perfecting Halas' complex offensive scheme of fakes, men in motion, and quick-hitting runs, Luckman added the dimension of accurate downfield throwing. He was instrumental in his team's record-setting 73–0 win over the Washington Redskins in the 1940 NFL championship game. Sportscaster Jimmy Cannon once said in reference to Luckman's years at Columbia, "You had to be there to realize how great Sid was." Luckman later became a sought-after tutor and instructor for universities wishing to install the T-formation as an offense.

=== Service with the Merchant Marine ===
In 1943, as soon as the season had ended, Luckman volunteered as an ensign with the U. S. Merchant Marine. He was stationed stateside and while he could not practice with the team, he did receive permission to play for the Bears on game days during the following seasons. He returned to the Bears full-time in 1946 and led the team to another NFL championship, his fourth.

=== Numbers and accomplishments ===
During his career, Luckman completed 51.8% of his passes for 14,686 yards and 137 touchdowns with 132 interceptions. He averaged 8.4 yards per attempt, second all-time only to Otto Graham (9.0), and also has a career touchdown rate (percentage of pass attempts that result in touchdowns) of 7.9 percent. Luckman also had 17 interceptions on defense for 310 yards and two touchdowns.

In 1943, Luckman completed 110 of 202 passes for 2,194 yards and 28 touchdowns. His 13.9% touchdown rate that year is the best ever in a single-season, while his 10.9 yards per attempt is second all-time. During one game that year, Luckman threw for 443 yards and seven touchdowns, still tied for the most passing touchdowns in one game; it was also the first 400-yard passing game in NFL history. His 28 touchdown passes in 1943 (in only 10 games) was a record that lasted until 1959, a 12-game season.

Luckman led the NFL in yards per attempt an NFL-record seven times, including a record five consecutive years from 1939 to 1943, and led the NFL in passing yards three times. Luckman was a five-time All-NFL selection, was named the National Football League's Most Valuable Player Award in 1943, and led the "Monsters of the Midway" to championships in 1940, 1941, 1943, and 1946. Despite the fact that his career ended in 1950, Luckman still holds the record for touchdowns in single game with 7, and owns several Bears' passing records, including:

- Intercepted: career (132), season (31 in 1947)
- Yds/Pass Att: career (8.42), season (10.86 in 1943)

== NFL career statistics ==
Legend
	Joe F. Carr Trophy (NFL MVP)
	Won the NFL championship
	NFL record
	Led the league
**Bold**	Career high
Underline	Incomplete data

=== Regular season ===
Year	Team	Games		Passing												Defense					Punting				
Year	Team	GP	GS	Cmp	Att	Pct	Yds	Y/A	Y/C	Lng	TD	Int	TD%	Int%	Rtg	Int	Yds	IntTD	FF	FR	Pnt	Yds	Y/P	Lng	Blck
1939	CHI	11	7	23	51	45.1	636	**12.5**	**27.7**	85	5	4	9.8	7.8	91.6	—	—	**1**	—	—	27	1,199	**44.4**	67	0
1940	CHI	11	7	48	105	45.7	941	9.0	19.6	74	4	9	3.8	8.6	54.5	3	17	0	—	—	27	1,147	42.5	70	0
1941	CHI	11	**11**	68	119	**57.1**	1,181	9.9	17.4	65	9	6	7.6	5.0	95.3	3	52	0	—	—	13	534	41.1	52	0
1942	CHI	11	10	57	105	54.3	1,023	9.7	18.0	52	10	13	9.5	**12.4**	80.1	**4**	**96**	**1**	—	—	24	976	40.7	60	0
1943	CHI	10	3	110	202	54.5	2,194	10.9	19.9	66	**28**	12	**13.9**	5.9	**107.5**	**4**	85	0	—	—	34	1,220	35.9	**78**	**1**
1944	CHI	7	—	71	143	49.7	1,018	7.1	14.3	**86**	11	12	7.7	8.4	63.8	2	36	0	—	—	20	685	34.3	63	0
1945	CHI	10	2	117	217	53.9	1,727	8.0	14.8	65	14	10	6.5	4.6	82.5	0	0	0	4	**4**	**36**	**1,299**	36.1	61	0
1946	CHI	11	5	110	229	48.0	1,826	8.0	16.6	48	17	16	7.4	7.0	71.0	1	24	0	**7**	**4**	33	1,235	37.4	69	0
1947	CHI	**12**	7	**176**	**323**	54.5	**2,712**	8.4	15.4	81	24	**31**	7.4	9.6	67.7	0	0	0	2	0	5	177	35.4	42	0
1948	CHI	12	7	89	163	54.6	1,047	6.4	11.8	53	13	14	8.0	8.6	65.1	0	0	0	1	1	10	384	38.4	49	0
1949	CHI	11	2	22	50	44.0	200	4.0	9.1	34	1	3	2.0	6.0	37.1	0	0	0	1	0	1	16	16.0	16	0
1950	CHI	11	—	13	37	35.1	180	4.9	13.8	44	1	2	2.7	5.4	38.1	—	—	—	—	—	0	0	—	0	0
Career		128	61	904	1,744	51.8	14,686	8.4	16.2	86	137	132	7.9	7.6	75.0	17	310	2	15	9	230	8,872	38.6	78	1

=== Postseason ===
Year	Team	Games			Passing												Defense					Punting				
Year	Team	GP	GS	Record	Cmp	Att	Pct	Yds	Y/A	Y/C	Lng	TD	Int	TD%	Int%	Rtg	Int	Yds	IntTD	FF	FR	Pnt	Yds	Y/P	Lng	Blck
1940	CHI	1	1	1–0	3	4	**75.0**	88	**22.0**	**29.3**	35	1	0	**25.0**	0.0	**156.2**	0	0	0	**1**	0	1	55	**55.0**	**55**	0
1941	CHI	**2**	**2**	**2–0**	13	21	61.9	201	9.6	15.5	42	0	0	0.0	0.0	93.6	—	—	—	—	—	5	184	36.8	—	0
1942	CHI	1	1	0–1	5	12	41.7	2	0.2	0.4	11	0	**2**	0.0	**16.7**	9.7	—	—	—	—	—	6	253	42.2	—	0
1943	CHI	1	—	—	**15**	**26**	57.7	**286**	11.0	19.1	**66**	**5**	0	19.2	0.0	135.6	**2**	**39**	0	0	0	3	111	37.0	—	0
1946	CHI	1	—	—	9	22	40.9	144	6.5	16.0	—	1	**2**	4.5	9.1	40.7	1	3	0	0	0	**7**	**297**	42.4	—	0
Career		6	4	3–1	45	85	52.9	721	8.5	16.0	66	7	4	8.2	4.7	89.4	3	42	0	1	0	22	900	40.9	55	0

== Later life ==
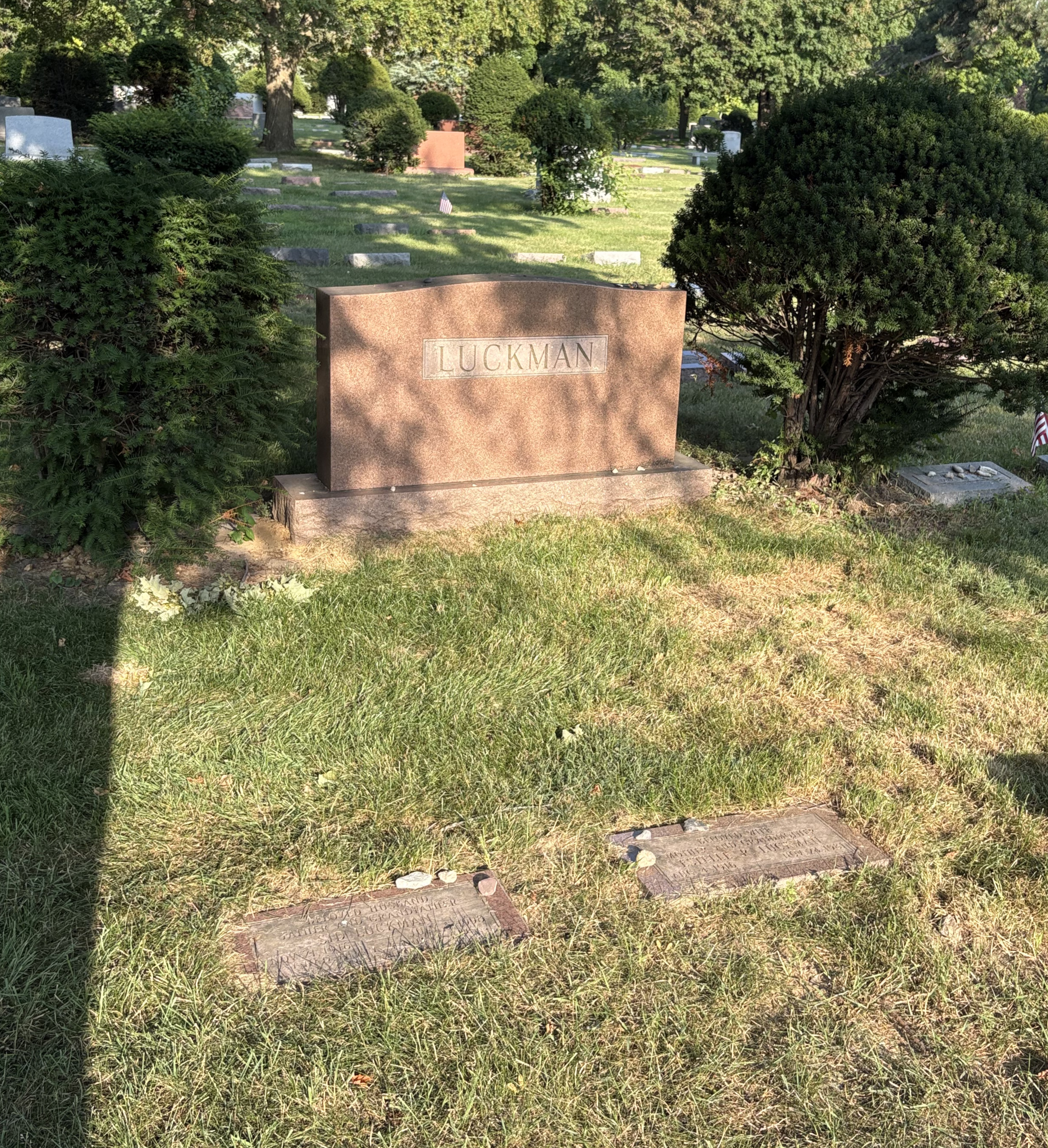
Luckman's grave at Memorial Park Cemetery

Upon retiring as a player, Luckman remained with the Bears as a vice president. In 1954, he became the team's quarterbacks coach on a part-time basis, a position he held through the 1960s.

After departing the NFL, he went to work for Cel-U-Craft, a Chicago-based manufacturer of cellophane products, eventually becoming its president. The company was a part of the Rapid American Corporation of which he also obtained shares. In 1969, Rapid American was the subject of an Internal Revenue Service investigation over the payment of these shares and dividends, a case that Luckman and his wife appealed.

Luckman's wife, Estelle Morgolin, died of cancer in 1981, and he underwent a triple heart bypass operation the following year. Luckman eventually retired to Aventura, Florida, where he died on July 5, 1998, at the age of 81. He was buried at Memorial Park Cemetery in Skokie, Illinois. He was survived by his son, Bob, and two daughters, Gail and Ellen.

== List of honors ==
=== Professional ===
As a player

- 4× NFL champion (1940, 1941, 1943, 1946)
- NFL Most Valuable Player (1943)
- 6× First-team All-Pro (1940–1944, 1947)
- Second-team All-Pro (1946)
- 3× Pro Bowl (1940–1942)
- 3× NFL passing yards leader (1943, 1945, 1946)
- 3× NFL passing touchdowns leader (1943, 1945, 1946)
- 3× NFL passer rating leader (1941, 1943, 1946)
- NFL completion percentage leader (1941)
- NFL 1940s All-Decade Team
- Chicago Bears No. 42 retired
- Chicago Bears All-Time Team (2019)
- 4th Greatest Chicago Bear of All-Time (2019)
- American Association champion (1939)

As a coach

- NFL champion (1963)

NFL records

- Most touchdown passes in a game: 7 (tied)
- Highest single-season passing touchdown percentage: 13.9%
- Highest single-postseason passing touchdown percentage: 19.2%
- Highest career passing touchdown percentage: 7.9%
- Highest single-season yards per attempt: 10.9
- Highest single-season yards per completion: 19.9
- Most passing touchdowns in an NFL Championship Game: 5 (1943)
  - Most passing touchdowns in an NFL Championship/Super Bowl: 5 (1943)
    - Tied by Joe Montana in Super Bowl XXIV
    - Broken by Steve Young with 6 in Super Bowl XXIX
- Most interceptions in a postseason game: 2 on December 26, 1943 (tied)
  - Broken by Joe Laws with 3 on December 17, 1944

Other

- Walter Camp Distinguished American Award (1988)

=== College ===
- First-team All-American (1938)
- Second-team All-American (1937)
- 2× First-team All-Eastern (1937, 1938)
- Metropolitan College All-Star Team (1938) (Note: Played a benefit game at Ebbets Field against the Brooklyn Dodgers on December 3, 1938.)
- Columbia Centennial Anniversary First-Team (1970)
- Columbia Football's Team of the Century (2000)
- Columbia Football All-150 Anniversary Team (2020)

Columbia record

- Highest average yards per punt in a single game (minimum three punts): 55.2 (seven punts for 387 yards) against Navy on November 12, 1938

=== Hall of Fame ===
- College Football Hall of Fame – Class of 1960
- Pro Football Hall of Fame – Class of 1965
- International Jewish Sports Hall of Fame – Inaugural Class of 1979
- Chicagoland Sports Hall of Fame – Class of 1980
- National Jewish Sports Hall of Fame and Museum – Class of 1995
- Columbia University Athletics Hall of Fame – Class of 2006
- Boys & Girls Clubs of America Alumni Hall of Fame

== See also ==
- List of select Jewish football players
