= Osmanski =

Osmanski is a surname. Notable people with the surname include:

- Bill Osmanski (1915–1996), American football player and coach
- Joe Osmanski (1917–1993), American football player
- Joy Osmanski (born 1975), Korean-American actress
