= LeRoy P. Hunt =

American Marine Corps general

LeRoy Philip Hunt
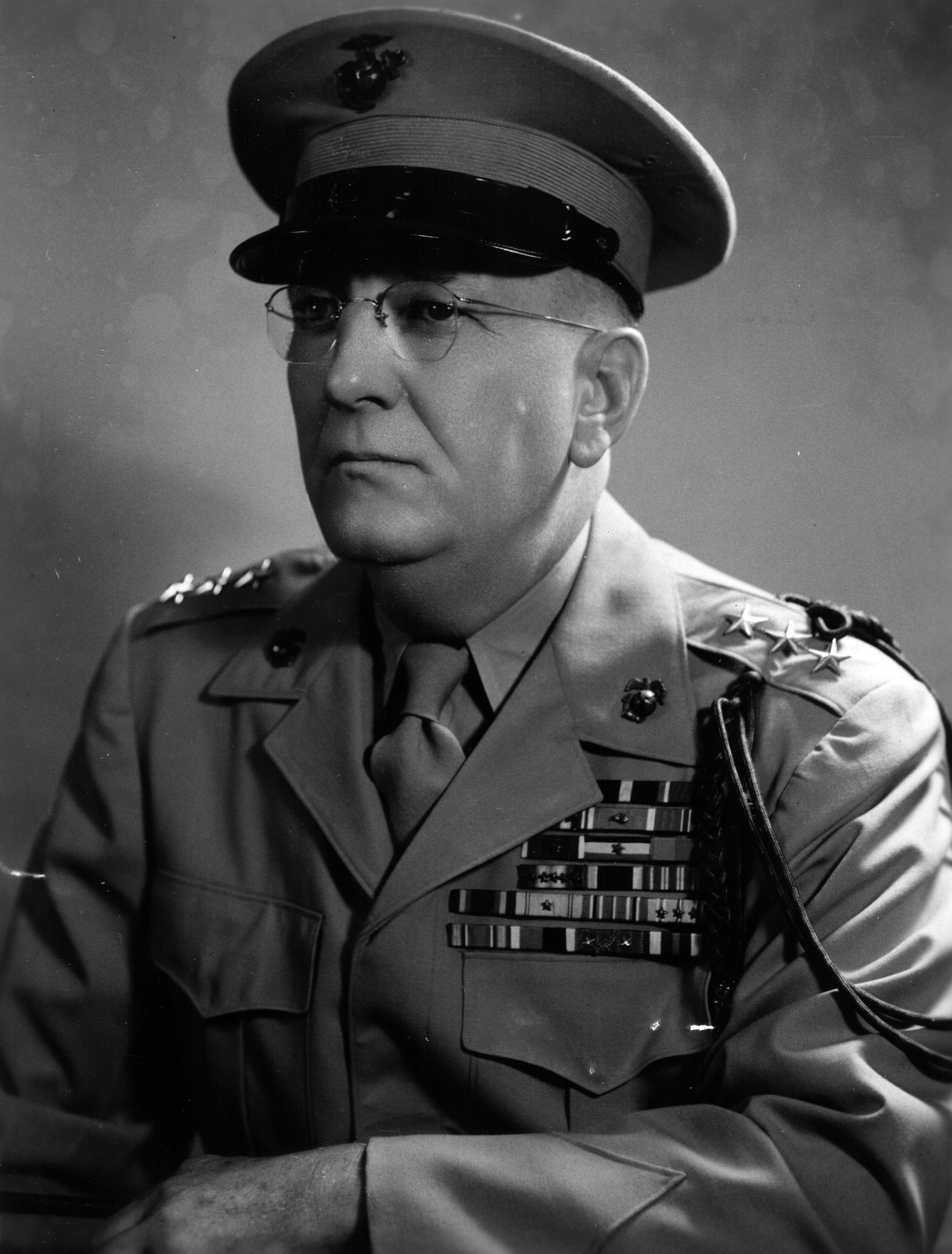
- LeRoy P. Hunt as a lieutenant general
- Born: March 17, 1892; Newark, New Jersey, US
- Died: February 8, 1968 (aged 75); San Francisco, California, US
- Military career
- Allegiance: United States
- Branch: United States Marine Corps
- Service years: 1917–1951
- Rank: General
- Nickname: "Roy"
- Service number: 0–460
- Commands: Fleet Marine Force, Atlantic; Department of the Pacific; I Army Corps; 2nd Marine Division; 5th Marine Regiment; 1st Battalion, 5th Marines
- Conflicts: World War I: Battle of Belleau Wood; Battle of Soissons; Battle of Saint-Mihiel; Battle of Blanc Mont Ridge; Battle of Argonne Forest; Yangtze Patrol; Nicaraguan Campaign; World War II: Occupation of Iceland; Battle of Guadalcanal; Battle of Okinawa
- Awards: Navy Cross; Distinguished Service Cross; Silver Star (3); Legion of Merit (2); Bronze Star Medal; Purple Heart (2); Croix de Guerre (France)

LeRoy Philip Hunt (March 17, 1892 – February 8, 1968) was a highly decorated officer in the United States Marine Corps with the rank of general. A veteran of World War I, he was decorated with the Navy Cross and Army Distinguished Service Cross, the United States military's two second-highest decorations awarded for valor in combat.

Hunt later served on Guadalcanal as commanding officer, 5th Marine Regiment during World War II, but was relieved of command due to poor leadership. However he restored his career later and distinguished himself as commanding general, 2nd Marine Division at the end of War and during the Occupation of Japan. He completed his service as commanding general, Fleet Marine Force, Atlantic in 1951.

== Early career ==
=== Belleau Wood and Soissons ===
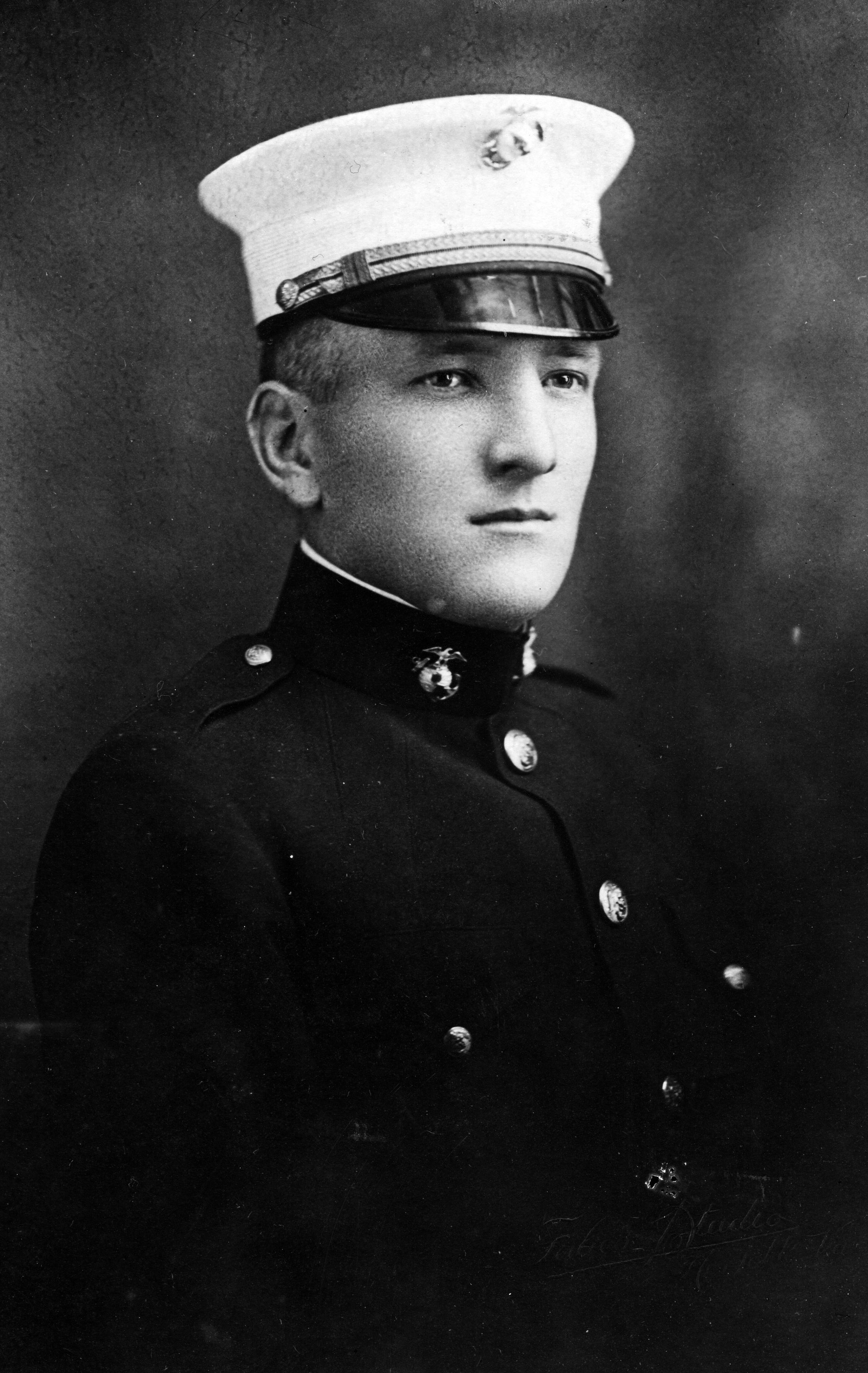
Hunt as lieutenant in 1917.

LeRoy P. Hunt was born on March 17, 1892, in Newark, New Jersey, as the son of Philip and Charlotte Hunt, but he grew up in Berkeley, California. He completed the public and high schools there and later attended the University of California.

Briefly before the United States entry into World War I, Hunt entered the Marine Corps service and was commissioned second lieutenant on March 16, 1917. He was sent to the Marine Officers' School at Marine Barracks, Norfolk Navy Yard, Virginia and upon the completion, he was promptly promoted to the rank of first lieutenant and assigned to the newly activated 5th Marine Regiment at Quantico. Hunt was attached to the 1st Battalion under Major Julius S. Turrill and appointed commander of the 17th Company.

He embarked for France in August 1917 and arrived to St. Nazaire, where his unit was tasked with the unloading of cargo from U.S. convoy ships. Hunt participated in the intensive training with French elite mountain infantry, Chasseurs Alpins. The training was focused on offensive and defensive trench warfare, including trench construction, grenade throwing, bayonet fighting, gas mask drill, weapons firing at land targets and airplanes and artillery and infantry-artillery demonstrations. He was promoted to captain by that time.

Hunt and his unit were ordered to the trenches in quiet Toulon Sector, southeast of Verdun in mid-March 1918 and remained there until the end of May. During the Battle of Belleau Wood in June of that year, Hunt was gassed and evacuated to the rear. He rejoined his unit few days later and resumed his duties as commanding officer of 17th Company. Hunt led his company during the Battle of Soissons in July 1918 and was tasked with the capture of Translor Farm southwest of the town of Chaudun.

During the advance on Chaudun under heavy machine gun fire, Hunt found a scattered remnants of Moroccan Colonial Infantry and attached them to his company. He and his company subsequently captured the town with several machine guns and prisoners, but Hunt was wounded again and evacuated to the rear. For his service during the capture of the town, he was decorated with the Silver Star.

Following his recovery, Hunt resumed again command of 17th Company and led it during the Battle of Saint-Mihiel in mid-September 1918. For his previous two wounds, he was later decorated with the Purple Heart with Oak Leaf Cluster.

=== Blanc Mont Ridge and Argonne Forest ===
At the beginning of October, 1918, Germans still held the commanding eminence northeast of Reims, called Blanc Mont Ridge. The French tried several times to capture to capture that high ground, but their attacks were always repelled. The Germans, who had controlled this territory since 1914, built an extensive double system of trenches known as Essen and Elbe trenches. The orders issued by commanding general John Lejeune were to advanced on the flanks until they met atop the ridge and then advance upon the town of St. Etienne.

The First battalion, 5th Marines including Hunt's 17th Company arrived to the area on October 1 with the rest of 4th Marine Brigade and captured the Essen trench without resistance on the following day. During the advance toward the Essen trench, Hunt distinguished himself during the capturing of the village of Somme-Py and received his second Silver Star for the leadership of his company.

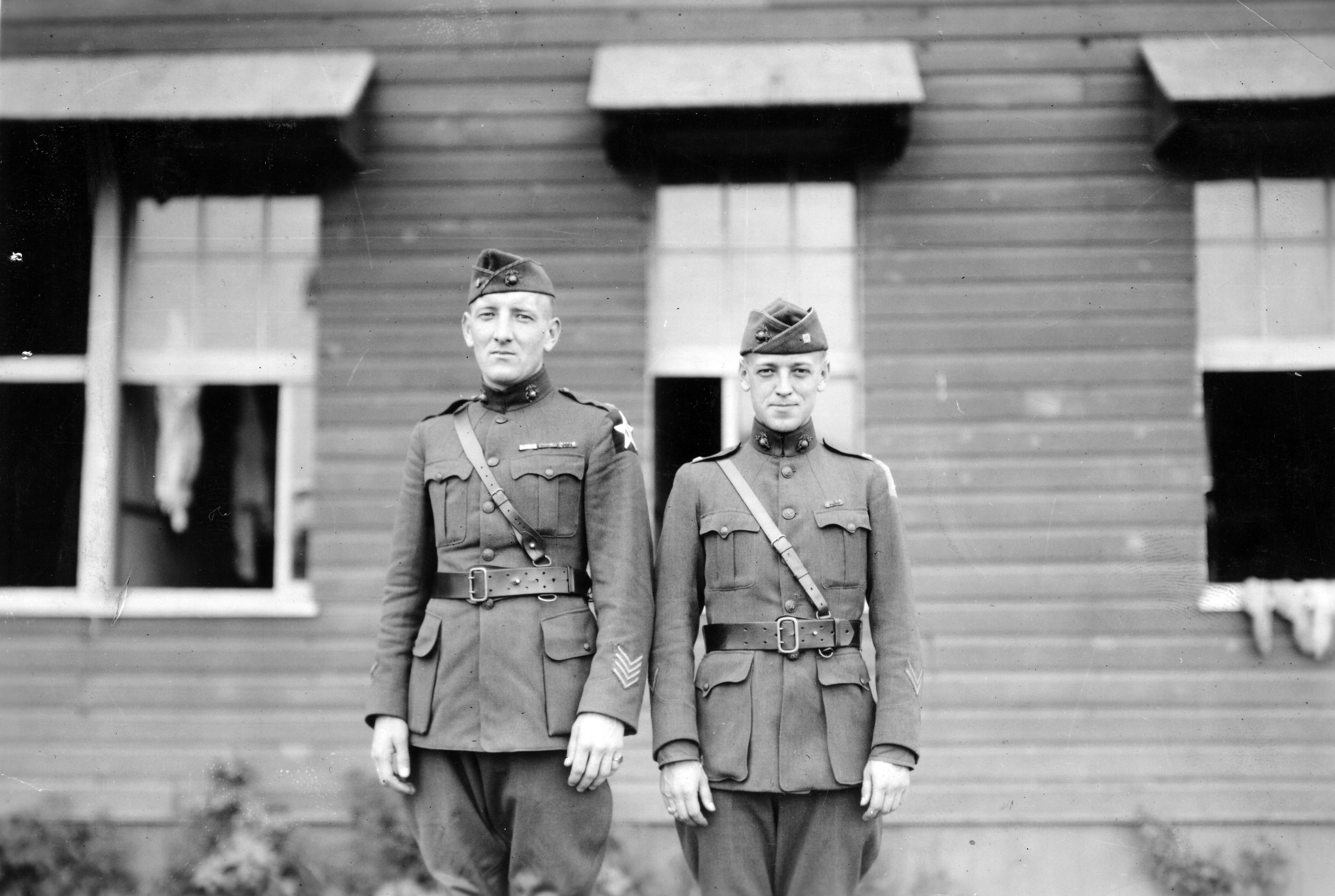
Major Hunt (left) with his adjutant Captain Lester D. Johnson at Camp Mills following the War.

The reconnaissance found German positions in the area of Bois de Vipere and general Lejeune scheduled the attack for morning of October 3 and Hunt and his company was holding the left flank of 5th Marine Regiment at the time. He launched the attack on enemy's positions and following the advance under intense machine gun and mortar fire, his company was halted by enemy approximately 800 meters from their objective.

Hunt ordered to set up a machine gun and requested 37mm gun, which arrived in very short time. He then designated the targets and due to excellent marskmanship of both 37mm gun and machine gun crews, four enemy machine guns were put out of action. The 17th Company was left behind by mistake in Essen trench, while rest of the first battalion proceeded up to the Blanc Mont Ridge. Hunt and his men spent next six hours of fighting and captured 300 prisoners.

The 17th Company was relieved by the French and rejoined the battalion in the advance up to the ridge. Unfortunately the French were driven out by the Germans and Hunt was forced to get back and retake the Essen Trench. He subsequently led his men during the attack on the town of St. Etienne on October 4 and despite heavy losses, Hunt and his company repelled a German counter-attack of 200 men. He constantly exposed himself to enemy fire while leading his men toward their objective and was decorated with the Army Distinguished Service Cross and Navy Cross for bravery and leadership during October 3–4, 1918.

During the crossing of Meuse river and subsequent attack on the Argonne Forest, Hunt assumed temporary command of 1st Battalion and distinguished himself during the combats near the town of Létanne on November 10–11, 1918. For his service in that capacity, he was decorated with third Silver Star. He was also decorated with Croix de Guerre with Palm and Fourragère by the Government of France.

=== March to the Rhine ===
Following the Armistice of 11 November 1918, the Fifth Marine Regiment was designated a part of the occupation forces in Germany. Hunt marched with his company through that country and crossed Rhine river at Remagen on December 13, 1918. They reached the town of Niederbreitbach two days later and battalion deployed his headquarters there. Hunt was appointed commanding officer of the First Battalion and now was co-responsible for the maintaining peace in the Rhineland demilitarized zone. He was promoted to the temporary rank of major at the time.

His battalion also conducted frequent maneuvers and parades and left Germany in mid-July 1919. Hunt embarked for United States and following the arrival on August 8, he took part in the Victory parades in New York City and Washington, D.C. being reviewed by President Woodrow Wilson, Commandant George Barnett or Major General John Lejeune.

== Interwar period ==
Hunt remained in the Marine Corps following the War and was reverted to the rank of captain. He was detached from the battalion at the end of August 1919 and ordered to Portland, Oregon, where he served in the local Marine recruiting office until February 1920. Hunt was subsequently sent to the Marine Corps Schools, Quantico, where he served as an instructor for brief period, before rejoined 5th Marine Regiment.

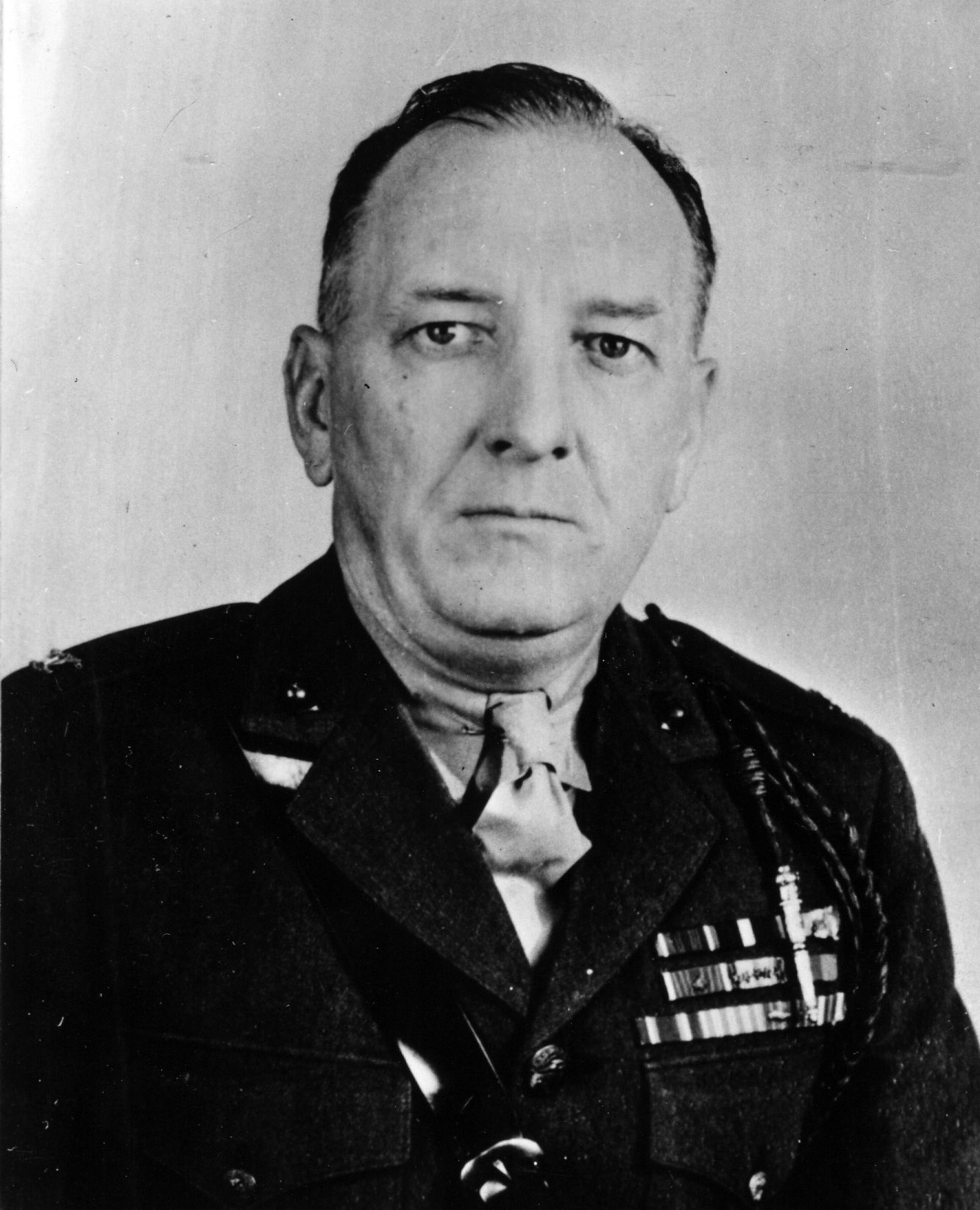
Hunt as Colonel in 1940.

He assumed command of the Marine detachment aboard the battleship USS Maryland in June 1923 and took part in the patrol cruises to the Panama Canal Zone, Australia and New Zealand. Hunt was ordered to the Marine Barracks, San Diego, California in July 1926 and also acted as commanding officer of the Western Mail Guard Detachment during the wave of robberies.

In February 1927, Hunt left for China as a member of 3rd Marine Brigade under Brigadier General Smedley Butler in order to protect American citizens and property at Shanghai International Settlement during internal disorders. He commanded 3rd Battalion, 4th Marines there until September 1928, when the emergency was called off and he returned to the United States.

Following his return stateside, Hunt was ordered to the Marine Barracks, Quantico, Virginia, and served as post adjutant under Major General Wendell C. Neville. While at Quantico, Hunt completed the Field Officers' Course at Marine Corps Schools there.

He graduated in June 1930 and embarked for expeditionary duty to Nicaragua. Hunt was promoted to major and was attached to the Nicaraguan constabulary, Guardia Nacional and served as commanding officer, Northern Area and Intelligence & operations officer during the combat operations against rebel forces under Augusto César Sandino. For his service in this capacity, he was decorated with Nicaraguan Cross of Valor and Diploma.

Hunt returned to the United States in December 1932 and served successively with the Marine barracks at Naval Station Great Lakes, Illinois; Headquarters Marine Corps in Washington, D.C., and Marine Barracks Quantico, where he rejoined 5th Marine Regiment.

In June 1935, he was promoted to lieutenant colonel and ordered to Alaska, where he participated in the Work Projects Administration's Matanuska Colonization Project. Hunt was comnended for his work by Harry Hopkins then head of the Work Projects Administration and left Alaska in July 1936.

He was subsequently ordered to Washington, D.C., where he served as executive officer of local Marine Barracks and registrar of the Marine Corps Institute, before he assumed command of the barracks. By the way, the barracks served as the official residence of the commandant of the Marine Corps, John H. Russell Jr.

Hunt was detached in June 1938 and ordered to the Naval War College at Newport, Rhode Island, for the Senior Course, which he completed in May 1939. He was subsequently ordered to the Hawaii and relieved Colonel Keller E. Rockey as force Marine officer on the staff of the Battle Force under Admiral Edward C. Kalbfus. While in this capacity, Hunt served aboard the battleship USS California during the Fleet Problem XX, which tested the defense of the Panama Canal with an elaborate three-week simulated battle in the South Atlantic and Caribbean beginning in February 1939. He was promoted to colonel in January 1940. Hunt was also commended by Commander-in-Chief, U.S. Pacific Fleet, James O. Richardson for his work during the exercise.

In February 1941, Hunt was transferred to the newly activated 2nd Marine Division under Major General Clayton B. Vogel and served as commanding officer of the Divisional Special and Service Troops for few months. While in this capacity, he was also on temporary duty on Iceland with 1st Provisional Marine Brigade in June 1941.

== World War II ==
At the beginning of 1940s, Hunt had a reputation as a charismatic, valiant troop leader, but he was no organizer, no planner. Despite this, he was appointed chief of staff, 1st Marine Division under Major General Philip H. Torrey following his return from Iceland in July 1941.

Shortly thereafter, 1st Marine Division participated in the amphibious exercise at Onslow Beach, North Carolina. The exercise did not go well, because of the problems with landing boats and insufficient ground warfare training of First Division men. Hunt's and Torrey's leadership was criticized by some of Divisional staff, mostly by Operations officer, lieutenant colonel Gerald C. Thomas.

=== Guadalcanal ===
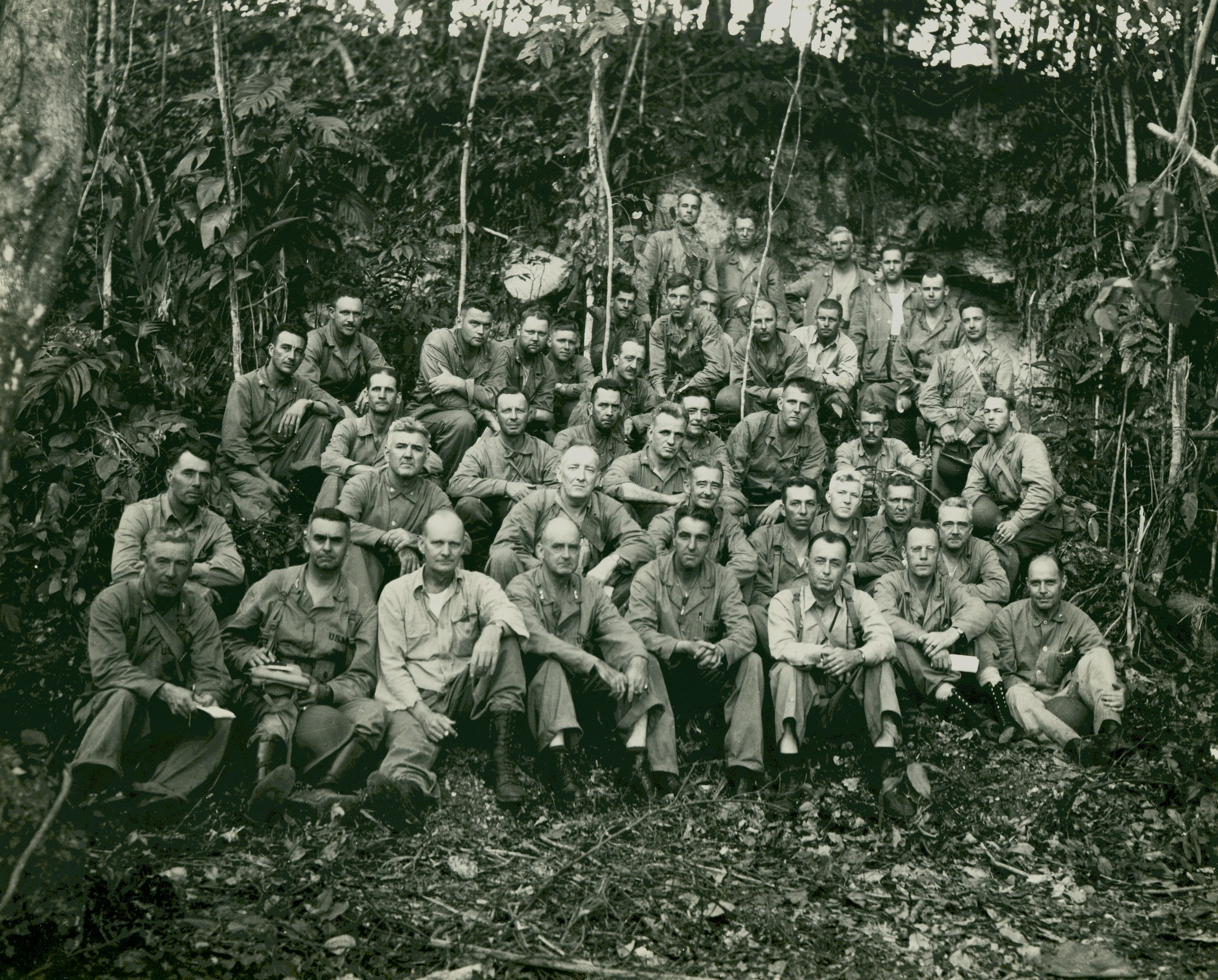
Hunt (sitting in the second row, third from left) with the staff of 1st Marine Division on Guadalcanal in late 1942.

The problems in command of 1st Division were promptly recognized by the Commandant Thomas Holcomb, who relieved Torrey and appointed his Assistant Division Commander, Alexander A. Vandegrift as his substitute. General Vandegrift subsequently made several personnel changes on his own, including Hunt, who was replaced by Colonel William C. James in April 1942. Vandegrift wanted a warrior to inspire 5th Marine Regiment's men, so he gave the job to Hunt.

Hunt now had the opportunity to command his World War I regiment and spent next month with intensive training in order to prepare his unit for combat deployment to South Pacific. The Fifth Marines embarked for New Zealand at the beginning of June 1942 and after one month near Wellington, Hunt and his unit sailed for Guadalcanal at the beginning of August. During his time in Wellington, Hunt got into another conflict, when divisional logistics officer, Randolph M. Pate complained to Vandegrift about the handling of the equipment and palletized cargo.

His regiment went ashore on August 7, 1942, and although it had initial success, the 1st Battalion had a very poor performance. Lieutenant Colonel Thomas from divisional operations section recommended Hunt to relieve its commanding officer, but instead of that, Hunt placed his command group in the lead of the advance. The situation had deteriorated, when the instructions for further advance which Thomas handed over to Hunt were not followed and 1st Battalion did not press the attack on Japanese positions, because Hunt thought that his battalion was unable to attack.

The First Battalion was attacked by Japanese and fought a confused, inept, and uncontrolled battle. Faulty communications made the tactical situation even worse than it was and an enraged General Alexander A. Vandegrift decided to relieve Hunt. He was relieved on September 19, 1942, and Colonel Merritt A. Edson assumed command of 5th Marines. Despite Hunt's poor leadership of 5th Marines, Vandegrift recommended him for promotion to brigadier general.

=== Hawaii ===
Hunt returned to the United States and spent several months at Naval Hospital, San Diego, due to the infection of Malaria. Following his full recovery in April 1943, his career was restored, when he was ordered to Hawaii, where he succeeded Harry K. Pickett as commanding general, Marine Garrison Forces, 14th Naval District. While in this capacity, Hunt was responsible for administration of Marine barracks and detachments securing Pacific Naval Bases, stations and installations on Hawaii, Midway, Johnston Atoll and Palmyra Island.

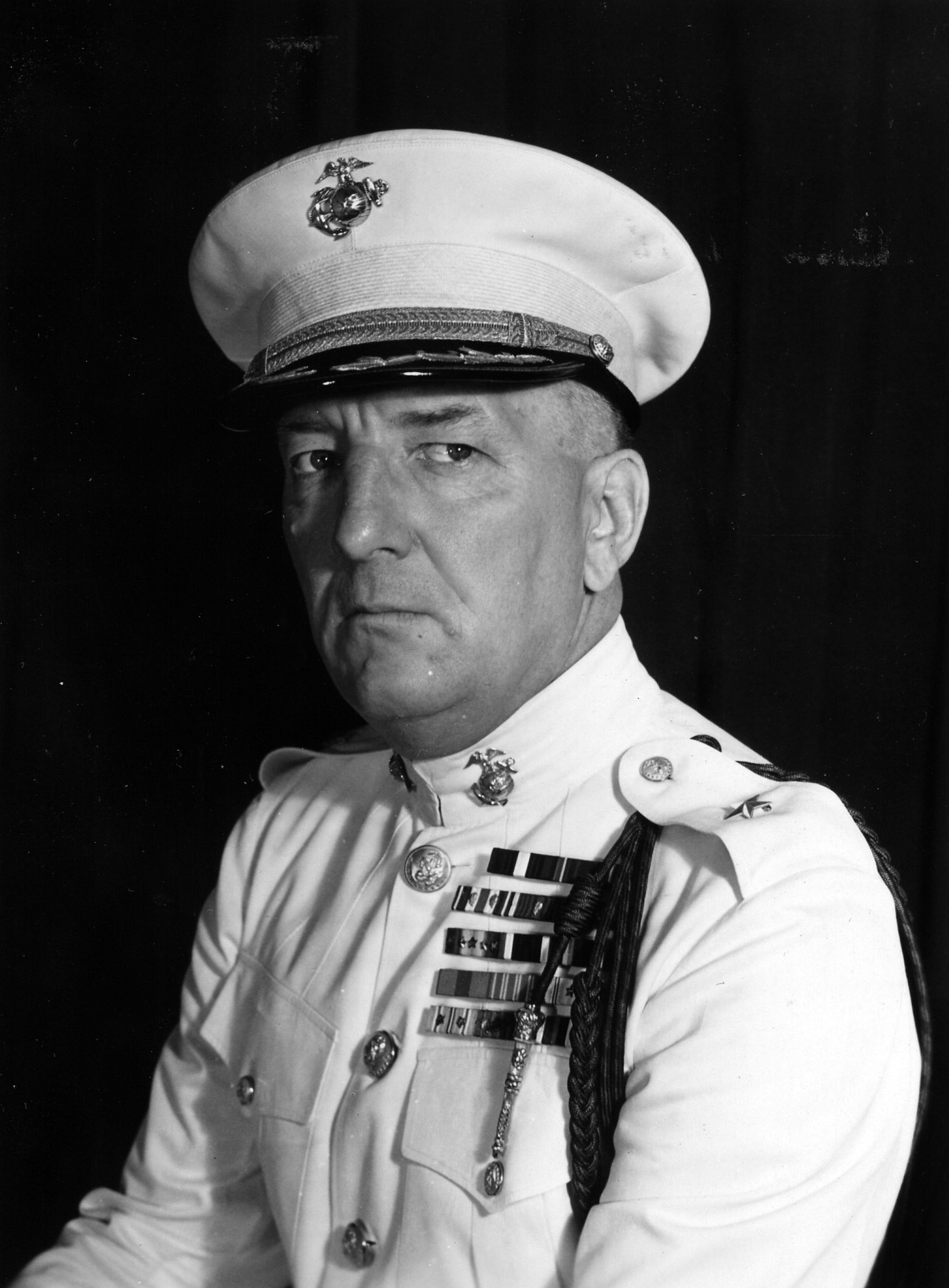
Brigadier general Hunt as Commanding General, Marine Garrison Forces, 14th Naval District.

He was promoted to brigadier general on July 1, 1943, and held this capacity until August 22, 1944, when he was relieved by Brigadier General Littleton W. T. Waller Jr. For his service on Hawaii, Hunt was decorated with the Legion of Merit.

=== Back in South Pacific ===
Hunt was subsequently ordered back to the South Pacific and joined the 2nd Marine Division under Major General Thomas E. Watson as assistant division commander. The division was stationed in the Mariana Islands and had conducted mopping-up operations on Saipan against scattered remnants of the enemy. Hunt remained on Saipan until the end of March 1945, when 2nd Marine Division was ordered to Okinawa.

The Second Division did not go ashore and remained as a floating reserve of U.S. Tenth Army, and made feints along the southern approaches to Okinawa. The division was ordered back to Saipan in mid-April 1945 and remained there until September of that year. Some parts of the division took part in the mopping-up operations on Okinawa and also made unopposed landings on the islands of Iheya and Aguni.

=== Occupation of Japan ===
Hunt was promoted to the rank of major general on June 23, 1945, and succeeded major general Watson in command of 2nd Marine Division. He sailed with his division to Japan in September 1945 and assume control of Nagasaki, Miyazaki, and Kagoshima Prefectures in southern Kyushu. His main task was to supervise the repatriation and demobilization of returning Japanese from Manchukuo and China.

His zone of occupation was expanded to highly industrialized prefecture of Kumamoto in central Kyushu in October 1945 and following the withdrawal of 5th Marine Division in early 1946, the Second Marine Division would be the only major Marine unit remaining on occupation duty in southern Japan. For his service in early occupation of Kyushu, Hunt received the Bronze Star Medal.

As a morale boost during the holiday season, he ordered the Atomic Bowl football game to be played on January 1, 1946, in Nagasaki, between occupying units of the United States Marine Corps. This was less than five months after the atomic bomb had devastated the city. The Isahaya Tigers, led by professional star "Bullet" Bill Osmanski of the Chicago Bears, defeated the Nagasaki Bears, captained by 1943 Heisman Trophy winner Angelo Bertelli, 14–13 in the first and only such contest.

The V Amphibious Corps was relieved by I Army Corps later in January 1946 and its commanding general, Roscoe B. Woodruff, returned to the United States for temporary assignment. Hunt as the region's senior division commander in Kyushu, assumed temporary command of the Army corps. His main responsibility was to hand over the Hiroshima and Yamaguchi Prefectures to British Commonwealth Occupation Force, for which he received his second Legion of Merit.

General Woodruff returned to Japan on April 5, 1946, and resumed command of the I Corps. Hunt turned over responsibility for the island of Kyushu to the 24th Division in mid-June 1946 and embarked with his division for the United States.

== Postwar career ==
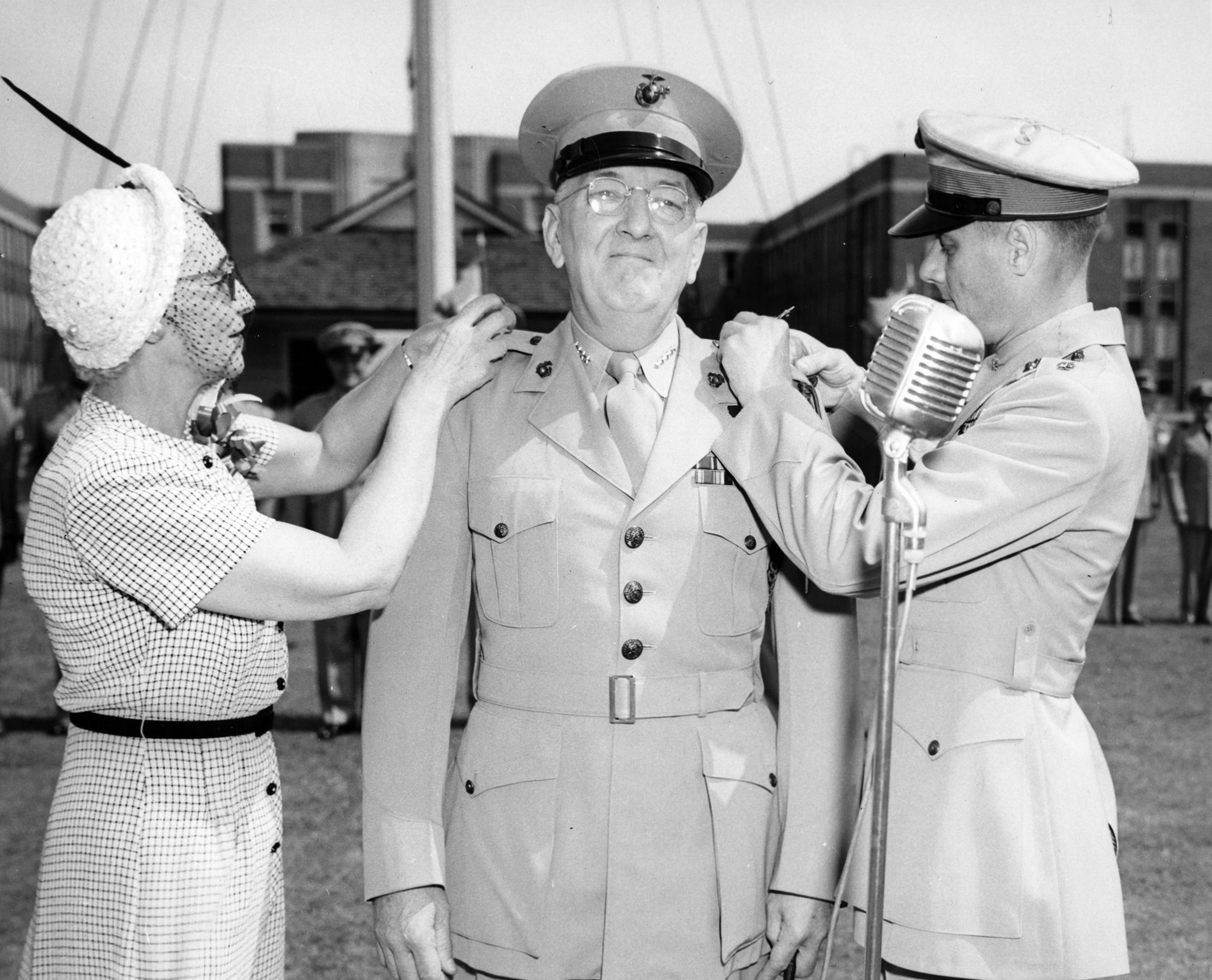
Hunt during his retirement ceremony, while being promoted to four-star general by his wife Hazel and son LeRoy Jr.

Following his return to the United States, Hunt was ordered to the Troop Training Unit, Amphibious Training Command, Pacific Fleet at Coronado, where he relieved retiring Major General Harry K. Pickett. While in this capacity, he was responsible for the amphibious training of Marine and Naval units within United States Pacific Fleet and also trained 2nd Army Infantry Division.

In January 1947, Hunt was transferred to San Francisco, where he assumed duty as commanding general, Department of the Pacific. This command was responsible for the administration, training and equipment of the Marine Corps Units on the West Coast, 14th Naval District (Hawaii and outlying Pacific islands) and all non Fleet Marine Force units in the Pacific Ocean Area.

He held that command until July 1, 1949, when he was promoted to the rank of lieutenant general and appointed commanding general, Fleet Marine Force, Atlantic with headquarters at Norfolk Navy Yard. While in this capacity, he held operational control over the 2nd Marine Division, the 2nd Marine Aircraft Wing, and the 2nd Marine Logistics Group until his retirement on July 1, 1951. Upon his retirement, Hunt was advanced again to the rank of four-star general for having been specially commended in combat.

== Later life and death ==
Hunt settled in San Francisco, California, and was appointed chairman of the Special Crime Study Commission on Organized Crime by Governor Earl Warren in September 1951. The main purpose of the commission was to Study the effectiveness of the tax laws of California in removing the profit from organized crime, investigate the narcotics traffic and organized prostitution and study ways of improving law enforcement.

He was appointed Commissioner of State Building and Loan Commission in mid-1953 and remained in that capacity for several years, before he retired for second time.

General LeRoy P. Hunt died on February 8, 1968, and is buried at Golden Gate National Cemetery in San Bruno, California, together with his wife Hazel Alma Orr Hunt (1892–1970). They were survived by their son, LeRoy P. Hunt Jr. who also served in the Marines and was decorated with the Silver Star on Saipan and Bronze Star Medal in China and retired from active duty as colonel.

== Awards and decorations ==
Here is the ribbon bar of General Hunt:

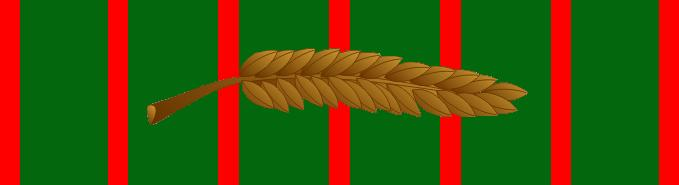

1st Row	Navy Cross		Distinguished Service Cross	Silver Star with two Oak leaf clusters	French Fourragère
2nd Row	Legion of Merit with Oak leaf cluster	Bronze Star Medal	Purple Heart with Oak leaf cluster	Navy Presidential Unit Citation with one star	French Fourragère
3rd Row	Marine Corps Expeditionary Medal	World War I Victory Medal with five battle clasps	Army of Occupation of Germany Medal	Second Nicaraguan Campaign Medal	French Fourragère
4th Row	Yangtze Service Medal	American Defense Service Medal with Fleet Clasp	American Campaign Medal	Asiatic-Pacific Campaign Medal with three 3/16 inch service stars	French Fourragère
5th Row	World War II Victory Medal	Navy Occupation Service Medal	French Croix de guerre with two Gilt stars and Palm	Nicaraguan Cross of Valor and Diploma	French Fourragère

=== Navy Cross citation ===
Citation:

The President of the United States of America takes pleasure in presenting the Navy Cross to Captain LeRoy Philip Hunt (MCSN: 0–460), United States Marine Corps, for repeated acts of extraordinary heroism while serving with the 5th Regiment (Marines), 2d Division, A.E.F. in action near St. Etienne, France, October 3 – 4, 1918. After six hours of severe fighting, Captain Hunt and his men succeeded in reducing a large sector of trenches and machine-gun nests, and captured 300 prisoners. On 4 October near St. Etienne, Captain Hunt constantly exposed himself to enemy fire while leading his men toward their objective. His gallant conduct gave his men confidence to completely rout superior enemy forces, concentrating for a counterattack.

=== Distinguished Service Cross citation ===
Citation:

The President of the United States of America, authorized by Act of Congress, July 9, 1918, takes pleasure in presenting the Distinguished Service Cross to Captain LeRoy Philip Hunt (MCSN: 0–460), United States Marine Corps, for repeated acts of extraordinary heroism while serving with the Fifth Regiment (Marines), 2d Division, A.E.F., in action near St. Etienne, France, October 3 – 4, 1918. After six hours of severe fighting, Captain Hunt and his men succeeded in reducing a large sector of trenches and machine-gun nests, and captured 300 prisoners. On 4 October near St. Etienne, Captain Hunt constantly exposed himself to enemy fire while leading his men toward their objective. His gallant conduct gave his men confidence to completely rout superior enemy forces, concentrating for a counterattack.

== See also ==
- Guadalcanal Campaign

Military offices
Preceded by Keller E. Rockey	Commanding General, Fleet Marine Force, Atlantic; July 1, 1949 – July 1, 1951	Succeeded by Graves B. Erskine
Preceded by Keller E. Rockey	Commanding General, Department of the Pacific; January 1, 1947 – July 1, 1949	Succeeded by Keller E. Rockey
Preceded by Thomas E. Watson	Commanding General, 2nd Marine Division; June 23, 1945 – July 9, 1946	Succeeded by Gregon A. Williams
Preceded by Robert Blake	Commanding Officer, 5th Marine Regiment; April 9, 1942 – September 19, 1942	Succeeded by Merritt A. Edson
