= Raymond R. Schumacher =

American football player (1924–1973)

Raymond Schumacher
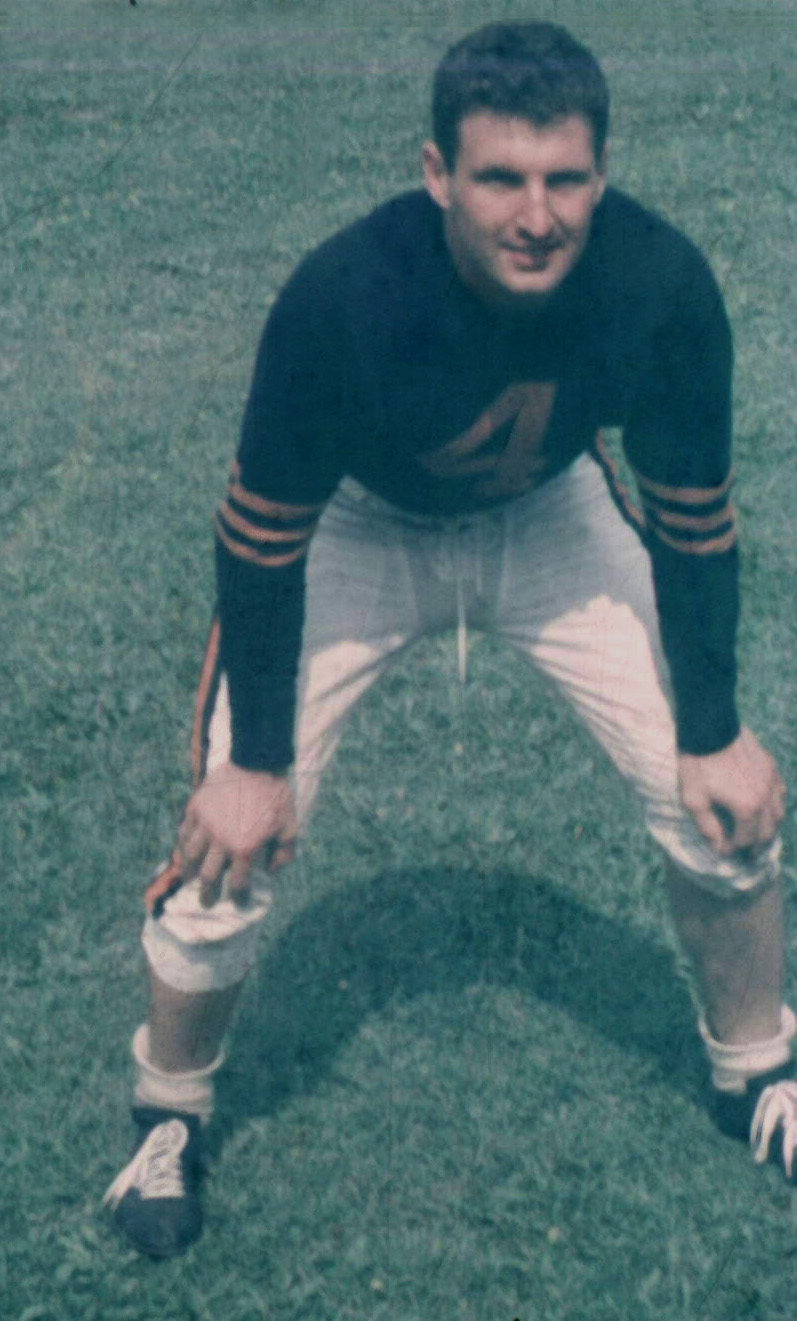
- Schumacher at Chicago Bears team practice
- Born: Raymond Richard Schumacher; April 15, 1924; Chicago, Illinois, USA
- Died: November 4, 1973 (aged 49); Oak Lawn, Illinois, USA
- Other name: Ray Schumacher
- Alma mater: Purdue University
- Military career
- Allegiance: United States
- Branch: United States Army Air Forces
- Service years: 1943–1946
- Rank: First Lieutenant
- Service number: 02068876
- Unit: 313th Air Division
- Football career

No. 4, 28
- Position: Fullback

Personal information
- Listed height: 6 ft 1 in (1.85 m)
- Listed weight: 185 lb (84 kg)

Career information
- High school: Tilden Technical High School
- College: Purdue

Career history
- Chicago Bears (1946–1947); → Akron Bears (1946); → Bloomfield Cardinals (1947)

Raymond Richard Schumacher (April 15, 1924 – November 4, 1973) served in the Army Air Force during World War II, played professional football as a fullback after the war, and later worked as civil engineer for the City of Chicago.

== Early life ==
Born in Chicago, Schumacher attended Tilden Technical High School, studying engineering, and was awarded the Purdue Club's 1942 Noble E. Kizer MVP Award in football. He then attended Purdue University.

== Military career ==
He was first inducted February 17, 1943 into the United States Army and went to basic training in North Carolina, where his bunkmate was Charles Clark. Others in his group included Wally Kokockis (Cicero Kid), Sgt. Nelphi, Sgt. (Porky) Thorton, Charles Clark, Jack Sather from Berkeley, California, Jimmie Spallus from Wisconsin, and Ray Shaw. All then went on to Janesville, Wisconsin for flight training.

Schumacher was later based at the following locations:

- Hondo Texas for navigator training, and served as an instructor afterwards
- Miami
- Macdill Air Force Base in Tampa about 7/43
- Lincoln, Nebraska where he trained navigators until mid-1945
- Victorville, Ca.
- Tinian

Early in his training he accepted an Argus camera as payment for a debt, and used it to take hundreds of photos of Army training camps and around the Pacific theater, including the atomic bomb waiting on the runway on Tinian. Near the end of the war B-29 crews did not always have exclusive use of a plane but rotated with another crew; his plane assigned while stationed on Tinian was known to have nose art of a lady and a name, but the number is unknown.

He flew in the formation over the treaty signing on the USS Missouri, was finally stationed in Tokyo until January 1946, and officially released March 17, 1946. He ended his military service as a First Lieutenant, Navigator, 20th AF, 313th Bomb Wing, 504th Bomb Group (Circle-E).

== Football career ==
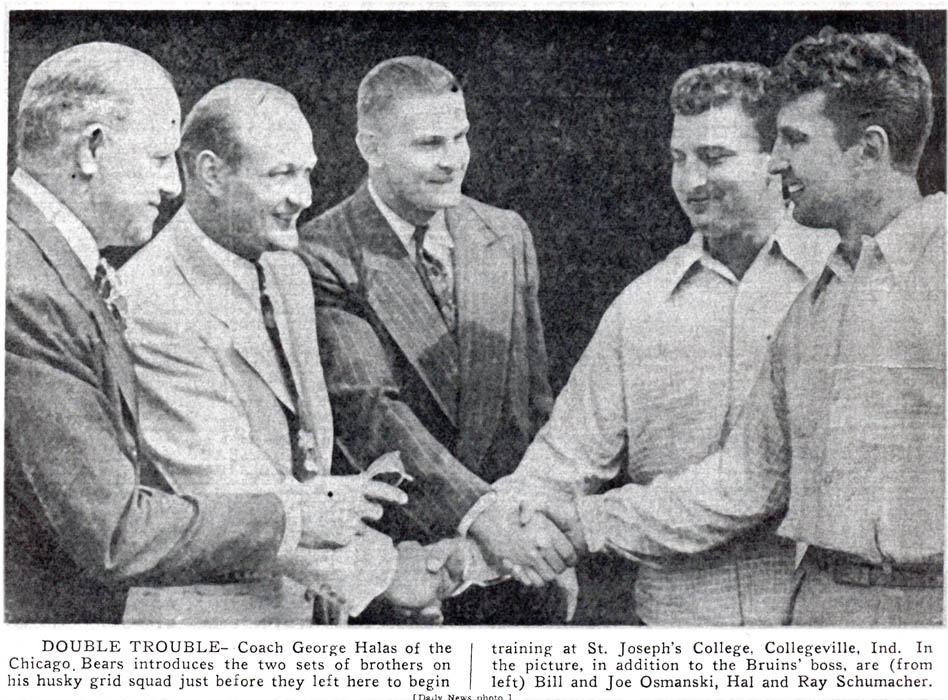
Brothers Schumacher and Harold (right) with George Halas and fellow brother pair Bill and Joe Osmanski in 1946

Schumacher was All-City in Chicago, winning the Kizer all-city award in December 1942 as a co-captain of the Tilden Tech Blue Devils. He then played one year at Purdue before enlisting in the Army Air Forces, subsequently playing for the Hondo Army Air Field Comets in Hondo, Texas.

Upon returning home, George Halas signed Raymond and his brother Harold to the Chicago Bears at the same time, on July 26, 1946. He first played for the Bears' farm team Akron Bears of the American Association, taking on their parent team in a September exhibition game at the Rubber Bowl.

In early 1947, Akron left the AFL leaving Newark as the Chicago Bears' primary farm team; Newark then moved to Bloomfield, New Jersey and became the Cardinals. In July 1947 he was re-signed to the Bears, coming up from Akron. In August, he played for the Bears in the Chicago College All-Star Game. He later played for the Bloomfield Cardinals during the 1947 season. He played in a preseason game for the Bears, starting 28 Aug 1948 against the Eagles, but played most games as substitution for star Bill Osmonski, and later retired with knee and other injuries. There had been some friction between Halas and Ray as well; Ray owned a garage with his brothers, and Halas did not like his players to have "outside" jobs.

A grandson of his brother James, Jerry Schumacher, was a linebacker for the Illinois Fighting Illini football team and spent time with the Bears in 2004.

== Personal life ==
Schumacher spent most of the rest of his life as a civil engineer for the City of Chicago, responsible for planning on the Deep Tunnel Project and others in the Metropolitan Water Reclamation District of Greater Chicago. He also owned and operated Parkview Lanes Bowling Alley with two of his brothers, as well as a small farm in Pepin County Wisconsin.
