= 1st Battalion, 11th Marines =

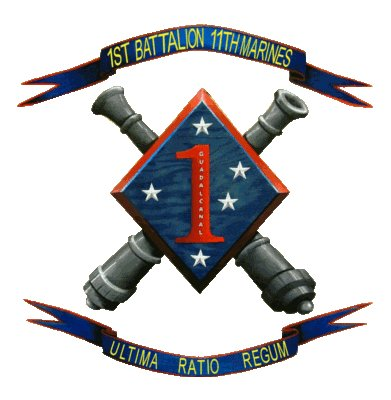
- 1/11 Insignia
- Active: 20 August 1917 – 11 August 1919; 3 December 1923 – 1 October 1947; 1 October 1949 – present
- Country: United States of America
- Branch: United States Marine Corps
- Type: Artillery
- Role: Provide fire support to the 1st Marine Division
- Size: 800
- Part of: 11th Marine Regiment; 1st Marine Division
- Garrison/HQ: Marine Corps Base Camp Pendleton; San Diego County, California
- Mottos: "Ultima Ratio Regum" "The Final Argument of Kings"
- Engagements: World War II; Guadalcanal campaign; Battle of Cape Gloucester; Battle of Peleliu; Battle of Okinawa; Korean War; Battle of Pusan Perimeter; Battle of Inchon; Battle of Chosin Reservoir; Vietnam War; Gulf War; War on terror; Iraq War; Operation Enduring Freedom; War against the Islamic State

Commanders
- Current commander: LtCol Daniel J. O'Connell
- Notable commanders: Harry K. Pickett; Lewis J. Fields

1st Battalion, 11th Marines (1/11) is an artillery battalion comprising five firing batteries and a Headquarters battery. The battalion is stationed at the Marine Corps Base Camp Pendleton in California. Its primary weapon system is the M142 HIMARS rocket artillery launcher and the M777 lightweight howitzer. The battalion is under the command of the 11th Marine Regiment, part of the 1st Marine Division.

== Mission ==
The Marines and Sailors of 1st Battalion, 11th Marines prepare mentally, physically, and operationally for the rigors of combat to provide 24/7 all-weather continuous artillery fires and achieve accurate first round fire for effect in support of maneuver elements.

== Subordinate units ==
- Headquarters Battery
- Battery A (Alpha Battery)
- Battery B (Bravo Battery)
- Battery C (Charlie Battery)
- Battery D (Delta Battery)
- Battery T (Tango Battery)

== History ==
=== Early years ===
The 1st Battalion, 11th Marines, was activated together with rest of the regiment on 20 August 1917 at the Marine Corps Base Quantico, Virginia. The battalion underwent intensive infantry training until September 1918, when it was attached to the 5th Marine Brigade and ordered to France. The 1st Battalion arrived on 13 October to Brest, but too late to see combat. The battalion was stationed in the area around the town of Tours until July 1919. when it was ordered stateside and deactivated at Norfolk Navy Yard on 11 August 1919.

The 1st Battalion was reactivated on 3 December 1923 at the Marine Corps Base Quantico, Virginia, as the 1st Battalion, 10th Regiment. It participated in mail guard duty in the mid-western United States from October 1926 to February 1927. The battalion deployed during April to June 1927 to Tientsin in China and was assigned to the 3rd Marine Brigade. The unit returned during September 1928 to MCB Quantico and was detached from the 3rd Marine Brigade during December 1928. It were re-designated on 10 July 1930 to the 1st Battalion, 10th Marines.

The battalion was assigned to the 1st Marine Brigade during September 1935. It was re-designated on 1 September 1940 as the 1st Battalion, 11th Marines. During October 1940, it was deployed to Guantanamo Bay in Cuba. On 1 February 1941, the 1st Marine Brigade was re-designated as the 1st Marine Division. The battalion relocated to New River, North Carolina during April 1941.

=== World War II ===
1st Battalion, 11th Marines was reassigned during March 1942 to the 3rd Marine Brigade. It was deployed during March 1942 to Western Samoa. The battalion was again reassigned to the 1st Marine Division in September 1942. The battalion participated in the Guadalcanal and New Britain campaigns; it also carried out operations on Finschhafen, Peleliu and Okinawa.

After the war the battalion was redeployed in September 1945 to Tientsin, China. It participated in the occupation of North China from September 1945 to January 1947. It was then redeployed during January 1947 to Guam, and detached from the 1st Marine Division. While in Guam, the unit constructed Camp Witek, the 1st Marine Brigade base. The battalion was reassigned during June 1947 to the 1st Marine Brigade. It was deactivated on 1 October 1947.

=== Korean War ===
The battalion was reactivated on 1 October 1949 at Camp Pendleton and assigned to the 1st Marine Division. It was then reassigned during July 1950 to the 1st Provisional Marine Brigade. The battalion was then deployed in July and August 1950 to Pusan in Korea. The battalion participated in the Korean War, from August 1950 to July 1953, taking part in the actions at the Battle of the Pusan Perimeter, at Inchon and the Chosin Reservoir. Personnel also saw action on the East-Central and Western Fronts, (such as the Battle of the Punchbowl). 1st Battalion, 11th Marines participated in the occupation of the Korean Demilitarized Zone from August 1953 to March 1955. It returned to Camp Pendleton in April 1955.

=== Vietnam War ===
The battalion deployed during August 1965 to Camp Hansen, Okinawa and redeployed during January 1966 to Chu Lai, in the Republic of Vietnam. It was reassigned to the 3rd Marine Division. During March 1966, the unit was reassigned to the 1st Marine Division.

The battalion operated from Chu Lai, Da Nang, Quang Tri, Phu Bai, Con Thien, Ca Lu, Khe Sanh, Cua Viet, Dong Ha and Quang Nam from January 1966 to March 1971. It was reassigned during 1971 to the 3rd Marine Amphibious Brigade; it returned during March 1971 to Camp Pendleton and reassigned to the 1st Marine Division.

Alpha Battery, 1st Battalion, 11th Marines was known as Alpha North in early 1966. On the night of 18 April 1966 Alpha North was overrun. It suffered 5 Marines killed and 28 wounded. All of the howitzers received damage. The battery moved to the 1-1 compound at Hoi An.

=== Gulf War and the 1990s ===
1st Battalion, 11th Marines participated in Operation Desert Storm from September 1990 to March 1991. Elements participated in Operation Sea Angel in Bangladesh from May to June 1991. Elements also participated in Operation Restore Hope in Somalia from December 1992 to March 1993.

=== Global war on terror ===
The battalion during the 2003 invasion of Iraq as depicted in the film Severe Clear

In January 2003 the battalion deployed in support of Operation Iraqi Freedom. After participating in the invasion of Iraq it returned to Camp Pendleton in July 2003. Individual firing Batteries have continued to support the MEU cycle in the war on terror since 2003. The battalion HQ deployed to Anbar Province, Iraq with Battery A, Battery C, and Battery K as a provisional infantry battalion in June 2007. The unit returned to Camp Pendleton in late April 2008.

In April 2010 the battalion deployed to Helmand Province, in Afghanistan, in support of Operation Enduring Freedom 10.1. The battalion was attached to the 1st Marine Division (Forward) Task Force Leatherneck. The battalion was reinforced, comprising three gun batteries (Bravo, India 3/12, and Lima 3/12) and a HiMARS rocket Battery (Tango 5/11, later Sierra 5/11). 1/11 was assigned an artillery tactical mission of General Support to Task Force Leatherneck.

The battalion returned from Afghanistan in November 2010 and began fielding the Expeditionary Fire Support System (EFSS).

In 2023, the battalion became a combined rocket and cannon artillery battalion as a component of force design 2030. With the deactivation of 5th Battalion, 11th Marines, the HIMARS batteries were transferred to 1/11. Currently, the HIMARS batteries support the unit deployment program and Battery C (M777) supports the WESTPAC MEU cycle.

== See also ==
- List of United States Marine Corps battalions
- Organization of the United States Marine Corps
