= Harry K. Pickett =

United States Marine Corps general

Harry Kleinbeck Pickett
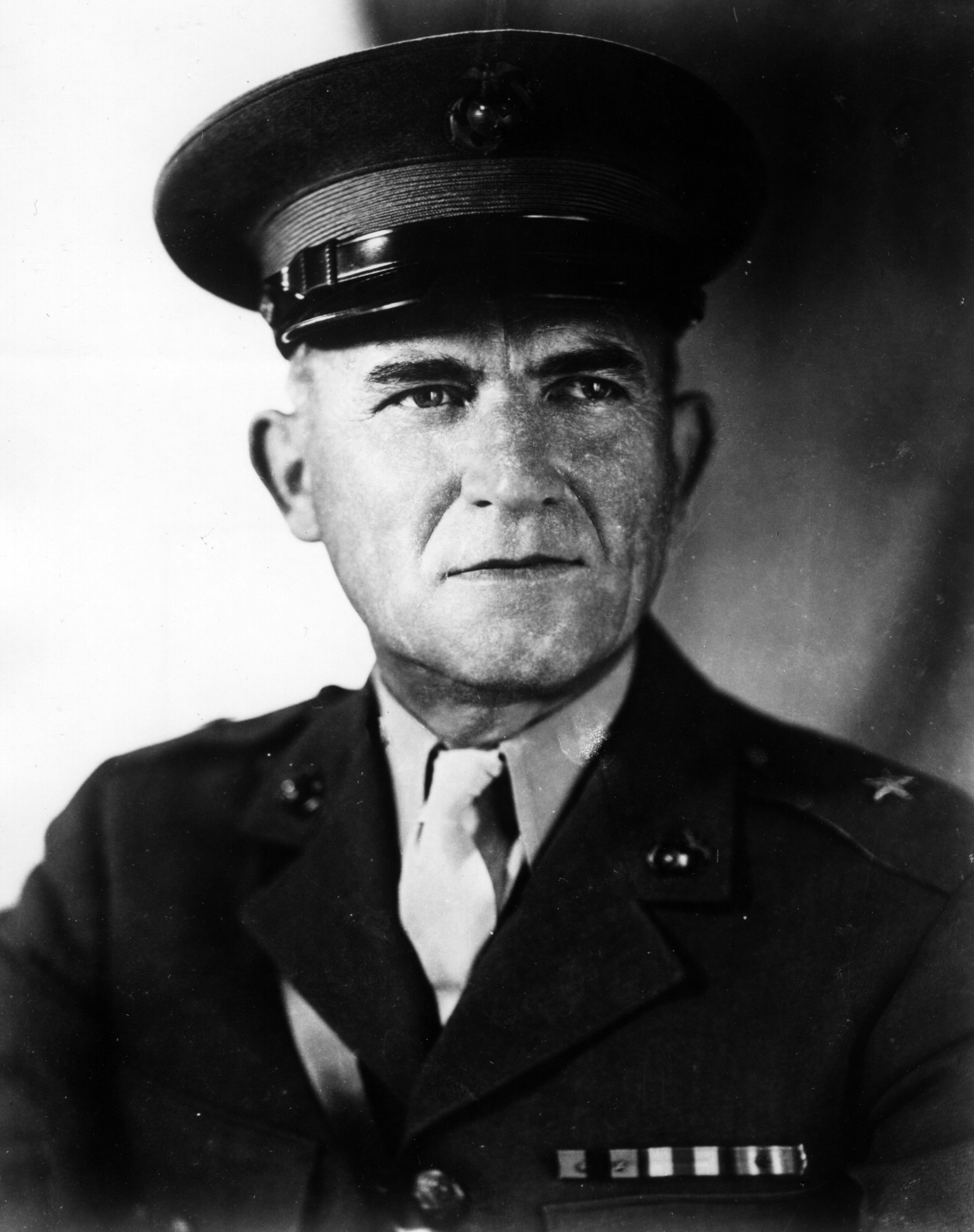
- Pickett as brigadier general, USMC
- Born: January 9, 1888; Ridgeway, South Carolina, US
- Died: March 19, 1965 (aged 77); Darjeeling, India
- Burial place: Singtom Cemetery; Darjeeling, India (1965-2023) Arlington National Cemetery
- Military career
- Allegiance: United States
- Branch: United States Marine Corps
- Service years: 1913–1946
- Rank: Major general
- Nickname: "Pick"
- Commands: Troop Training Unit, Pacific Fleet; Marine Garrison Forces, 14th Naval District; 3rd Defense Battalion; 1st Battalion, 11th Marines
- Conflicts: Veracruz Expedition; World War I Dominican Campaign; Haitian Campaign; World War II: Attack on Pearl Harbor
- Awards: Legion of Merit (2)

Major General Harry Kleinbeck Pickett (January 9, 1888 – March 19, 1965) was a United States Marine Corps Officer who has the distinction of having been present at the start of both world wars; he was serving as Commanding Officer of the Marine barracks at Pearl Harbor on December 7, 1941 and is most noted for leading the unit that trained both Marine and Army amphibious units in the Pacific Theater during World War II.

== Early years ==
Harry K. Pickett was born on January 9, 1888, in Ridgeway, South Carolina, the son of James Cason and Wilhelmina (Heins) Pickett. Following high school, Pickett entered The Citadel in Charleston. While there, he served as first Drum Major of the Regimental Band, when it was organized in 1909. Pickett graduated in 1911 with a Bachelor of Science degree in Engineering and was commissioned a second lieutenant in the Marine Corps on March 15, 1912.

Pickett's first assignment was at Marine Officers' School at Norfolk Navy Yard, in Virginia, where he underwent officer training. Upon graduation in June 1914, Pickett was attached to the 4th Marine Regiment and sailed to the Naval Station in Guam. Before his regiment sailed to the Pacific, it took part in the Veracruz Expedition during the summer of 1914.

Pickett served on Guam until August 1917, during which time he reached the rank of Captain. He took part in the capture of the German Merchant raider SMS Cormoran in April 1917, when United States declared war on Germany.

Upon his return to the United States, Pickett served for a brief period at the Marine barracks at Puget Sound Navy Yard in Bremerton in Washington. He was transferred to the Marine barracks at Quantico in Virginia in January 1918 and attached to the newly activated 11th Marine Regiment. Pickett served as commanding officer of a company in the regiment's 1st Battalion. Following a temporary promotion to the rank of Major on July 1, 1918, he then assumed command of 1st Battalion.

Pickett's regiment was attached to the 5th Marine Brigade under Brigadier General Eli K. Cole and ordered to France in October 1918. Picket and his unit arrived too late to see combat in World War I and spent the rest of the war in the towns of Issoudun and Montierchaume. After several months of occupation duty, Pickett returned to the United States in August 1919. The 11th Marines were deactivated after arrival at Naval Station Norfolk and Pickett reverted to his substantive rank of captain. He was then transferred to the Marine barracks at Charleston Navy Yard, before he was ordered for recruiting duty in Memphis in September 1920.

Pickett was posted to the 4th Marine Regiment in October 1921 which then sailed with 2nd Marine Brigade, under Brigadier General Charles G. Long, to Santo Domingo. His regiment was tasked with the support of military government and suppression of bandits under Desiderio Arias. Returning to the United States in June 1922, Pickett attended a field officers' course at the Marine Corps Schools in Quantico and then attached to Marine Corps headquarters. He was promoted to major on July 28, 1925, and assigned for duty with the Quartermaster Department under Brigadier General Charles L. McCawley.

From June 1928, Pickett was attached to the 1st Marine Brigade and sent to Haiti. He took part in jungle patrols against Cacos bandits and also served as an instructor with the Garde d'Haïti. He returned to the United States in January 1930 and served at Marine Corps headquarters until July 1935 during which time he was promoted to the rank of lieutenant colonel, on May 29, 1934. He then served at Marine Corps installations at Quantico and San Diego and completed a course at Army Coast Artillery School at Fort Monroe in Virginia. Picket was promoted to the rank of Colonel on June 28, 1938.

== World War II ==
Because of the increasing danger of Japanese expansion in Pacific during 1939, the United States Congress established a special board under Admiral Arthur J. Hepburn. This board was tasked with the investigation of need for additional naval bases in Pacific. Hepburn and his board emphasized the importance of Midway Atoll, Wake Island, Johnston Atoll and Palmyra Atoll. Pickett, who was the Senior Marine Officer of the 14th Naval District at the time, was tasked with the survey of all four atolls.

In May 1940, Pickett supervised the deployment of the 3rd Defense Battalion under Lieutenant Colonel Robert H. Pepper on Hawaii and ordered one of his 3-inch anti-aircraft artillery detachments to defend Midway Atoll. In March 1941, the 1st Defense Battalion under Lieutenant Colonel Bertram A. Bone also arrived on Hawaii and Pickett ordered immediately some of his detachments to the defensive positions on Palmyra and Johnston Atoll. In August of that year, he also ordered another defense detachment to Wake. These battalions consisted of the batteries with 5"/51 caliber guns, searchlight and aircraft sound locator and antiaircraft groups with M2 Browning and M1917 Browning machine guns and were ideal for the defense of the islands from attack from the sea and air.

In addition to his duties as Marine officer of the 14th Naval District, Pickett commanded the 3rd Defense Battalion from the end of August 1940 to the beginning of February 1941, when he handed over the command back to Pepper.

During the Japanese attack on Pearl Harbor on December 7, 1941, Pickett was serving as commanding officer, Marine Barracks Pearl Harbor, he was later commended by Admiral Claude C. Bloch, commander of the 14th Naval District, for his efforts during the attack. Pickett later received the Legion of Merit for his service in connection with the preparation of defenses on Hawaii and other islands. He was promoted to the rank of brigadier general in January 1942.

Pickett was succeeded by Brigadier General LeRoy P. Hunt on May 19, 1943, and ordered stateside. After a brief period of leave at home, Pickett was ordered to Camp Elliott near San Diego and was tasked with the organization of the Troop Training Unit, Amphibious Training Command, Pacific Fleet at Coronado. This unit, under his command, was later responsible for the amphibious training of several marine units, including the 5th Marine Division. Pickett also coordinated the amphibious training for the United States Army's 81st Infantry Division. He was later commended for his service at Coronado by Admiral Richmond K. Turner, the commander of Amphibious Forces, Pacific Fleet and also by Major General Paul J. Mueller, commander of the 81st Division. On the basis of these commendations, he was decorated with his second Legion of Merit.

== Retirement ==
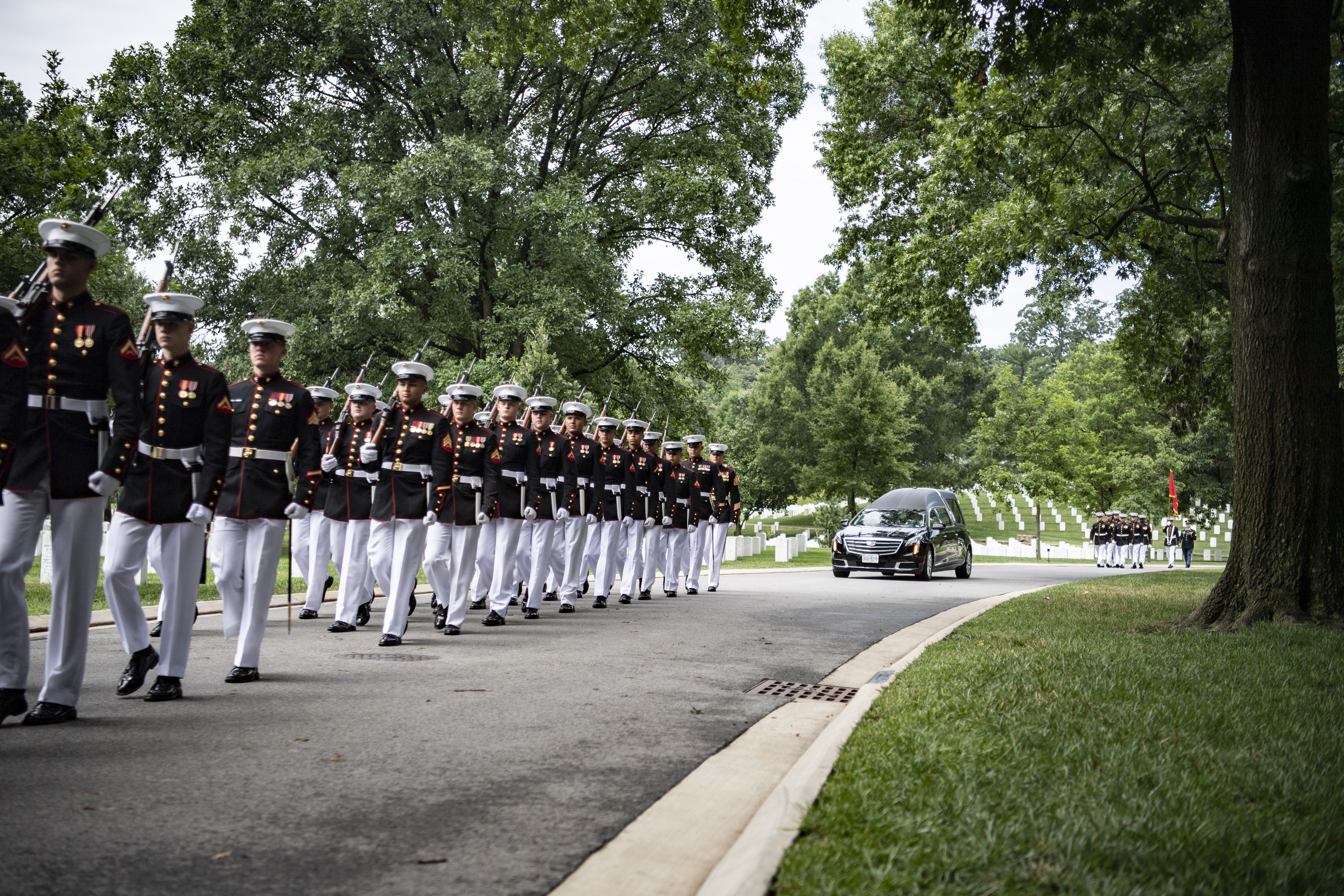
Military funeral honors with funeral escort for Harry K. Pickett at Arlington National Cemetery (July 19, 2023)

Following the end of the war, Pickett remained in command of the Troop training Unit at Coronado until July 1946, when he was succeeded again by Major General LeRoy Hunt. Pickett then retired from the Marine Corps after 33 years of active service and was advanced to the rank of major general for having been specially commended for performance of duty in actual combat. He was also appointed Honorary Commander of the Order of the British Empire for his service in the Pacific and at Coronado.

Pickett died suddenly of heart failure on March 19, 1965, in Darjeeling, India, while on a round-the-world trip. The Major General Harry K. Pickett Memorial Scholarship at his alma mater is dedicated to his honor. The scholarship is awarded to young men of character, who are residents of the state of South Carolina or sons of United States Marines.

In May 2023, Pickett's remains were removed from India for reburial at Arlington National Cemetery. This required a long effort by his granddaughter along with assistance from Major Bob Mebane, a retired Army officer and Colonel Russ Olson U.S. Army retired, a former attache at the United States Embassy in New Delhi; both were graduates of The Citadel.

== Decorations ==
Here is the ribbon bar of Major General Harry K. Pickett:

1st Row	Legion of Merit with one 5/16" Gold Star			
2nd Row	Marine Corps Expeditionary Medal with two stars	Mexican Service Medal	World War I Victory Medal with one clasp	American Defense Service Medal with Base Clasp
3rd Row	Asiatic-Pacific Campaign Medal	American Campaign Medal	World War II Victory Medal	Honorary Commander of the Order of the British Empire

Military offices
Preceded by Newly activated	Commanding General of the Troop Training Unit, Pacific Fleet; August 25, 1943 – July 30, 1946	Succeeded by LeRoy P. Hunt
