= Atom Bowl =

American football game played in Nagasaki

Isahaya Tigers	Nagasaki Bears
14	13
Head coach: Bill Osmanski	Head coach: Angelo Bertelli
	1	2	3	4	Total
ISA	0	0	0	14	14
NAG	13	0	0	0	13
- Date: January 1, 1946
- Stadium: Atomic Athletic Field No. 2, Nagasaki, Japan
- Attendance: 2,000

The Atom Bowl or Atomic Bowl was an American football game played in Nagasaki, Japan on January 1, 1946, between units of the United States Marine Corps. The Isahaya Tigers, led by professional star "Bullet" Bill Osmanski of the Chicago Bears, defeated the Nagasaki Bears, captained by 1943 Heisman Trophy winner Angelo Bertelli, 14–13 in the first and only contest.

== Background ==
Approximately six weeks after Nagasaki was hit by an American atomic bomb, the United States Marine Corps, particularly the 2nd Marine Division, began their occupation of the city. To entertain homesick servicemen during the holiday season, especially in a destroyed city, major general LeRoy P. Hunt ordered the 2nd Division's services staff to organize a football game on New Year's Day 1946; while who created the "Atom Bowl" moniker for the game is unknown, Hunt is speculated to be the one responsible. United States Marine Corps Reserve colonel Gerald Sanders, who was the division's recreational officer and played college football at Louisiana Tech, approached second lieutenant and quarterback Angelo Bertelli to help him. The two received equipment from United States Navy sailors, while they built bleachers and goal posts out of wood scraps. The game took place at Atomic Athletic Field No. 2, one of two recreational fields in Nagasaki that was cleared of rubble.

As the two teams' captains, Sanders selected Bertelli and Navy lieutenant Bill Osmanski; as Bertelli and Osmanski were the 1943 Heisman Trophy winner and former star for the National Football League's Chicago Bears, respectively, Sanders felt their reputations gave the game prestige. Bertelli and Sanders were teammates on the Nagasaki Bears, which consisted of players from colleges like Colorado State, Duquesne, Texas Tech, and UCLA. Osmanski led the Isahaya Tigers, featuring those from Michigan State, Temple, and Washington. Former high school football players serving in the division were also picked to complete the teams.

To further boost morale, Sanders held a Christmas program by a Japanese children's choir for American combat veterans. Sanders recalled that despite initial wariness from the soldiers, they "sat there and they cried and they just really found that all Japanese weren't bad that night. People felt good and walked out, talking, arms around each other."

== Game ==
Japanese cheerleaders were brought in for spectator entertainment, while a Marine band performed at halftime. About 2,000 Marines including Hunt attended the game, while Japanese civilians watched from a distance or in damaged buildings.

Prior to the game, Bertelli and Osmanski agreed the game would be two-hand touch football as glass shards were present on the playing field. Teams were also to gain 15 yards for a first down rather than the traditional ten. Secretly, the captains promised to ensure the game end in a tie to avoid affecting unit happiness.

Being a quarterback, Bertelli's Bears utilized a pass-heavy offense. In the first half, he threw two touchdown passes to Duquesne alumnus George Pukoski and Benjamin Franklin High School (New York)'s Pat Donat; although Bertelli missed one of the extra points, his team led 13–0 at halftime.

In the fourth quarter, Osmanski responded with two touchdown runs. Despite their secret agreement, Osmanski converted the second extra point to give the Tigers the 14–13 win. A livid Bertelli confronted Osmanski after the game, prompting the latter to apologize before remarking, "It was an act of God! [...] Either that, or force of habit." In a 2005 interview with The New York Times, Bertelli's son Mike quipped, "My dad didn't lose any sleep over it, but of all the games he played in, he remembered that incident."

After the game, the teams toured the ruins of Nagasaki. When Bertelli returned to the United States later in the year and signed with the All-America Football Conference's Los Angeles Dons, he recruited Atom Bowl players Bill Joslin and Gorham Graham, who were still stationed in Japan, to join him.
