= Angelo Bertelli =

American football player (1921–1999)

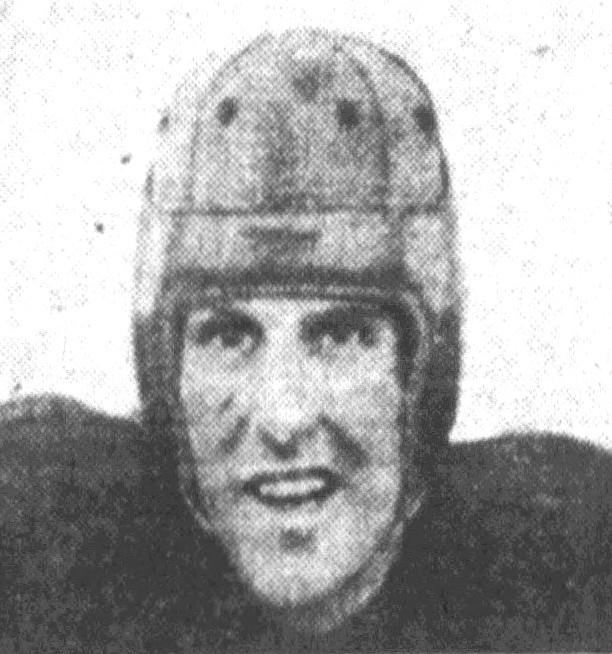
- Bertelli c. 1946

No. 65, 64, 42, 66
- Position: Quarterback

Personal information
- Born: June 18, 1921; West Springfield, Massachusetts, U.S.
- Died: June 26, 1999 (aged 78); Clifton, New Jersey, U.S.
- Listed height: 6 ft 1 in (1.85 m)
- Listed weight: 190 lb (86 kg)

Career information
- High school: Cathedral (Springfield, Massachusetts)
- College: Notre Dame (1941–1943)
- NFL draft: 1944: 1st round, 1st overall pick

Career history
- Los Angeles Dons (1946); Chicago Rockets (1947–1948)

Awards and highlights
- National champion (1943); Heisman Trophy (1943); SN Player of the Year (1943); Consensus All-American (1943); First-team All-American (1942)

Career AAFC statistics
- Passing attempts: 166
- Passing completions: 76
- Completion percentage: 45.8%
- TD–INT: 8–19
- Passing yards: 972
- Passer rating: 41.1
- Stats at Pro Football Reference
- College Football Hall of Fame

Angelo Bortolo Bertelli (June 18, 1921 – June 26, 1999) was an American football quarterback. He played college football for the Notre Dame Fighting Irish, where he won the Heisman Trophy in 1943. He played professionally in the All-America Football Conference (AAFC).

== Early life ==
Bertelli was born in West Springfield, Massachusetts, on June 18, 1921, to Italian immigrant parents. At Cathedral High School in Springfield, he won all-state honors in football, baseball, and hockey, and was senior class president.

== College career ==
When Bertelli entered Notre Dame in 1940, he was 6 feet 1 inch and 173 pounds, a skinny but highly regarded tailback in the single-wing formation used by most college teams. When Coach Elmer Layden left to become commissioner of the National Football League, Notre Dame's new coach Frank Leahy immediately noticed Bertelli's passing talents.

As a sophomore, Bertelli, still a single-wing tailback, led the nation with a 56.9 percent passing average, completing 70 of 123 attempts. In 1942, Leahy switched to a modified T formation, in which Bertelli would play under the center and take every snap. As he told his budding star, "Bert, you're the finest passer and the worst runner I've ever coached." That summer, preparing for his new role, Bertelli said he took "a thousand snaps...maybe a million." Bertelli and the T-formation were an immediate success. He passed for 1,039 yards and 10 touchdowns. Celebrated sportswriter Grantland Rice referenced Bertelli as "the T-formation magician."

During his senior year in 1943, the Marine Corps activated Bertelli after six games of Notre Dame's 10-game season. In the six games Bertelli started in, he threw 36 passes, completing 25 with 10 touchdowns. Bertelli's six-game 1943 performance was enough to win the Heisman Trophy earning 648 votes; he was informed of his Heisman win while in boot camp at Parris Island. During Bertelli's three seasons, Notre Dame lost only three games. In 1943, Notre Dame won 43 to 5 on average. He also played defense and punted at Notre Dame.

Bertelli's collegiate career earned him multiple awards. He was named to the 1942 and 1943 All-American teams. In the Heisman voting for America's outstanding college football player, Bertelli finished second in 1941 and sixth in 1942 before capturing the trophy in 1943. Though he was on active duty with the Marine Corps, the Boston Yanks selected Bertelli as their number one draft choice in 1944. Bertelli was inducted to the College Football Hall of Fame in 1972.

== Military service ==
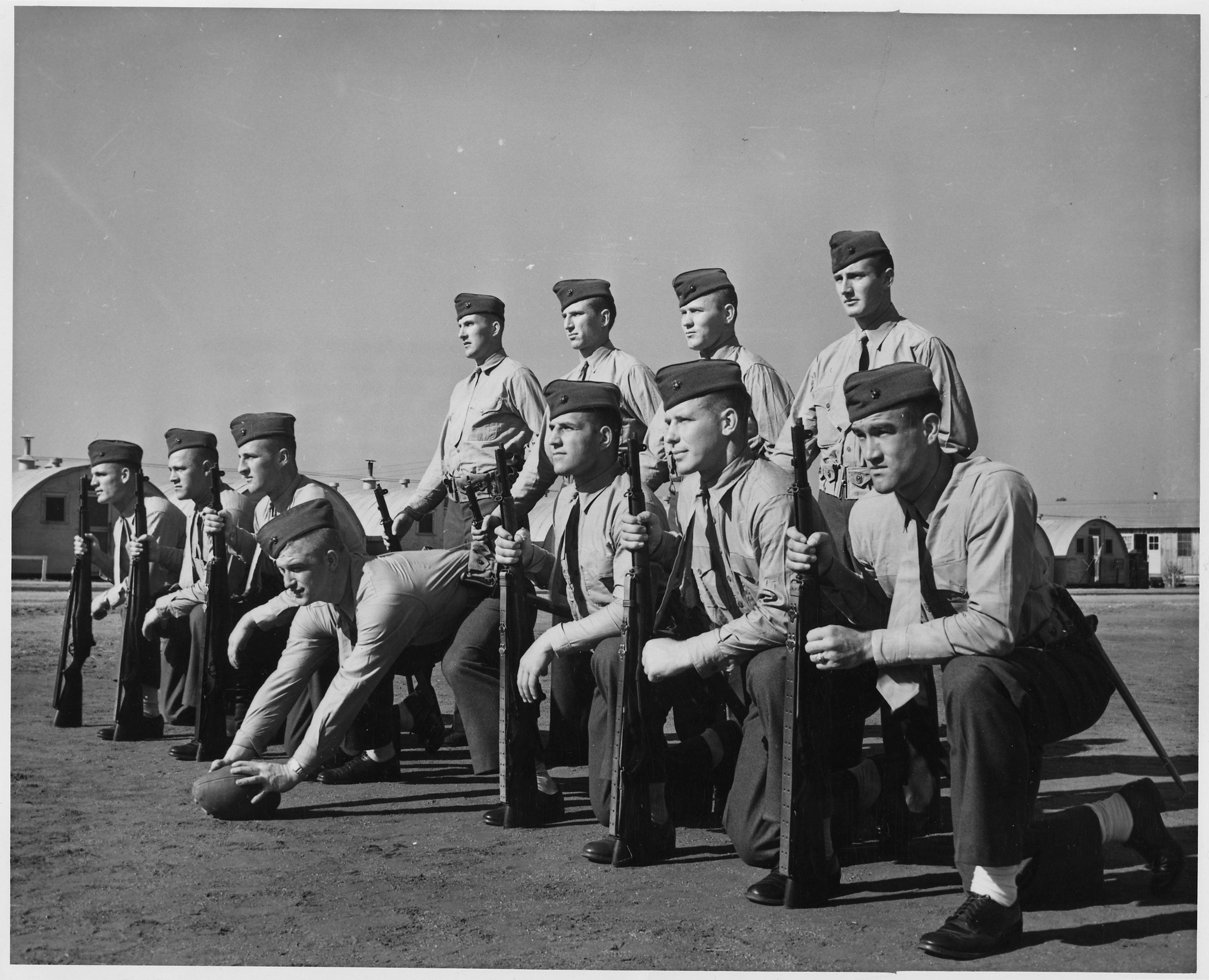
Bertelli during Marine Corps training

While at Notre Dame, Bertelli enlisted in the Marine Corps Reserves in 1942 prior to his activation to active duty in the fall of 1943. In 1944, Bertelli was promoted to the rank of second lieutenant, where he served as an infantry and recreation officer. After stops at Quantico, Camp Lejeune and Camp Pendleton, Bertelli embarked to participate in combat operations in the Pacific. After arriving from Guam in February 1945, he served in the Battle of Iwo Jima as a liaison officer with the 21st Marine Regiment, where he was nearly killed when a Japanese mortar shell landed 15 feet away from his position; four others were also caught in the explosion, with a doctor suffering serious wounds but surviving.

Bertelli returned to Guam in March 1945 and served in Sasebo, Japan. When World War II ended, Bertelli was stationed in Nagasaki with the 2nd Marine Division as a second lieutenant. On January 1, 1946, he captained a Marine football team, the Nagasaki Bears, in the Atom Bowl against National Football League star Bill Osmanski and his Isahaya Tigers, where he threw two touchdown passes in the first half; although the two had promised to ensure the game end in a tie to promote unit morale, Osmanski scored the game-winning extra point in the 14–13 Tiger win. Bertelli's son Mike quipped in 2005, "My dad didn't lose any sleep over it, but of all the games he played in, he remembered that incident."

Bertelli later entered the United States Marine Corps Reserve where he was promoted to the rank of captain and served until 1957.

== Professional career ==
After returning to the United States in 1946, Bertelli signed with the Los Angeles Dons of the AAFC; he also recruited Atom Bowl players Bill Joslin and Gorham Graham, who were still stationed in Japan, to play with him. Bertelli played for the Chicago Rockets between 1947 and 1948. After several knee surgeries, he retired prior to the 1949 season. After his retirement from professional football, Bertelli moved to Clifton, New Jersey, and operated several businesses, with Bertelli Enterprises, Inc. becoming a retail liquor outlet.

He was the color analyst for the Princeton University football games broadcast on radio station WVNJ, 620 AM and 100.3 FM in the 1950s and 60s.

== Death and family ==
On June 26, 1999, Bertelli died at the age of 78 after a losing battle with brain cancer. He was buried in Immaculate Conception Cemetery, Montclair.

He was survived by his wife, the former Gilda Passerini whom he married in 1944, and four children. Bertelli is the father of Robert Bertelli, better known as Bob Bert, a musician who played in Sonic Youth and other bands.
