= Joe Osmanski =

American football player (1917–1993)

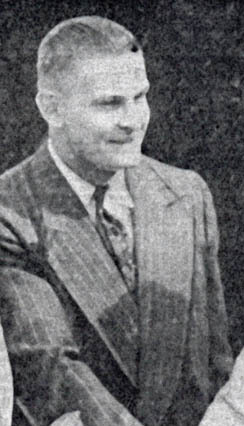
- Osmanski in 1947

No. 18, 80
- Position: Fullback

Personal information
- Born: December 26, 1917; Providence, Rhode Island, U.S.
- Died: July 24, 1993 (aged 75); Chicago, Illinois, U.S.
- Listed height: 6 ft 2 in (1.88 m)
- Listed weight: 218 lb (99 kg)

Career information
- High school: Central (Providence)
- College: Holy Cross (1937-1940)
- NFL draft: 1941: 18th round, 170th overall pick

Career history
- Chicago Bears (1946–1949); New York Bulldogs (1949)

Awards and highlights
- NFL champion (1946)

Career NFL statistics
- Rushing yards: 1,182
- Rushing average: 4.3
- Receptions: 36
- Receiving yards: 329
- Total touchdowns: 6
- Stats at Pro Football Reference

Joseph Charles Osmanski (December 26, 1917 – July 24, 1993) was an American professional football fullback in the National Football League (NFL) for the Chicago Bears and New York Bulldogs. He played college football at the College of the Holy Cross and was drafted in the 18th round of the 1941 NFL draft by the Washington Redskins.

Osmanski was the younger brother of Bears player Bill Osmanski. The two became teammates in Chicago in 1946 when Bill returned from World War II and Joe was traded to the team.

== Biography ==
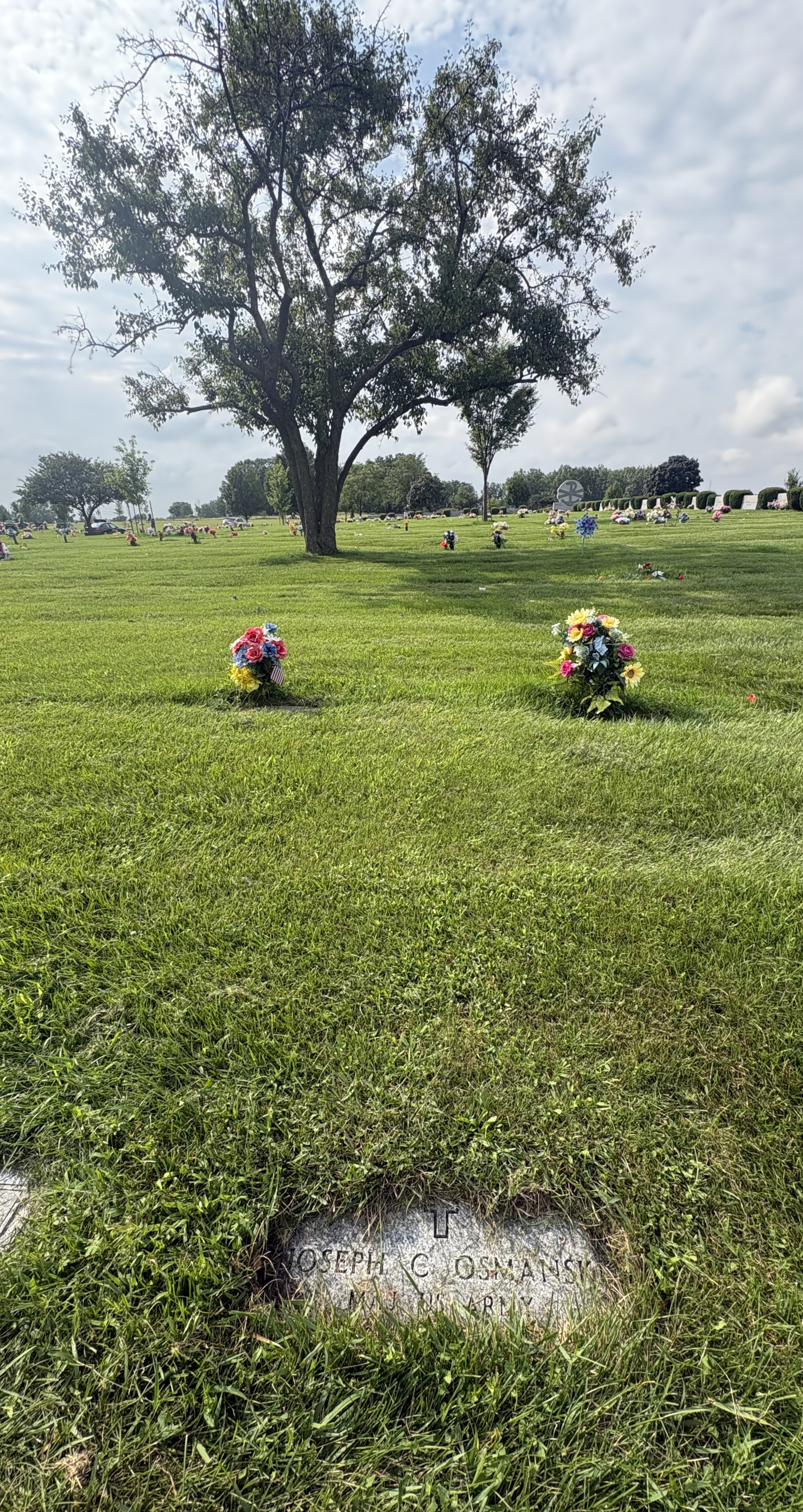
Osmanski's grave at Maryhill Catholic Cemetery

Osmanski died at Northwestern Memorial Hospital on July 24, 1993, and was buried at Maryhill Catholic Cemetery in Niles, Illinois.

== NFL career statistics ==
Legend
	Won the NFL Championship
**Bold**	Career high

Year	Team	Games		Rushing					Receiving				
Year	Team	GP	GS	Att	Yds	Avg	Lng	TD	Rec	Yds	Avg	Lng	TD
1946	CHI	8	6	55	201	3.7	19	**2**	2	14	7.0	14	0
1947	CHI	12	3	64	328	**5.1**	24	1	7	134	**19.1**	39	0
1948	CHI	12	1	**74**	**341**	4.6	32	1	9	43	4.8	19	0
1949	CHI	2	0	15	45	3.0	12	0	1	3	3.0	3	0
1949	NYB	8	8	66	267	4.0	**48**	**2**	**17**	**135**	7.9	**42**	0
		42	18	274	1,182	4.3	48	6	36	329	9.1	42	0
