= Bill Osmanski =

American football player and coach (1915–1996)

No. 9
- Position: Fullback

Personal information
- Born: December 29, 1915; Providence, Rhode Island, U.S.
- Died: December 25, 1996 (aged 80); Chicago, Illinois, U.S.
- Listed height: 5 ft 11 in (1.80 m)
- Listed weight: 197 lb (89 kg)

Career information
- High school: Central (Providence)
- College: Holy Cross (1935-1938)
- NFL draft: 1939: 1st round, 6th overall pick

Career history
- Chicago Bears (1939–1943, 1946–1947)

Awards and highlights
- 4× NFL champion (1940-1941, 1943, 1946); 2× First-team All-Pro (1939, 1941); 3× Pro Bowl (1939–1941); NFL rushing yards leader (1939); NFL 1940s All-Decade Team; 100 greatest Bears of All-Time; Second-team All-American (1937); Third-team All-American (1936); 2× First-team All-Eastern (1937, 1938); No. 25 jersey retired by Holy Cross

Career NFL statistics
- Rushing yards: 1,753
- Rushing average: 4.8
- Receptions: 12
- Receiving yards: 170
- Total touchdowns: 21
- Interceptions: 4
- Stats at Pro Football Reference
- College Football Hall of Fame

William Thomas Osmanski (December 29, 1915 – December 25, 1996), nicknamed "Bullet Bill", was an American professional football player who was a fullback for the Chicago Bears of the National Football League (NFL). He was briefly a head coach after his playing career. He was inducted into the College Football Hall of Fame in 1973 and in 1977 he was inducted into the National Polish-American Sports Hall of Fame.

== College of the Holy Cross ==
After graduating from Central High School in Providence, Osmanski attended the College of the Holy Cross in Worcester, Massachusetts. He played fullback for the Crusaders from 1936 to 1938. These three seasons were some of the most successful in Holy Cross' football history with the record of 23–3–3. "Bullet Bill" was named an All-American in 1938. He was named the Most Valuable Player at the College All-Star Game in 1939. His jersey number, 25, was retired by Holy Cross.

== Chicago Bears ==
Osmanski was drafted in the first round with the sixth overall pick of the 1939 NFL draft by the Chicago Bears. The pick paid immediate dividends for the Bears as Osmanski led the National Football League in rushing in 1939 with 699 yards. The Bears also selected Hall of Fame quarterback Sid Luckman in the first round, forming the backbone of the Bears' great 1940s teams, which won championships in 1940, 1941, 1943, and 1946.

With a 68-yard run, Osmanski scored the first touchdown of Chicago's 73–0 victory over the Washington Redskins in the 1940 NFL Championship Game. He rushed for 109 yards in what remains the most one-sided championship game in the league's history.

== Military career ==
In October 1943, Osmanski and some of his Bears teammates announced they would be joining the United States Navy. A dentist who was regularly attached to divisions in the United States Marine Corps, he worked as the head football coach at Marine Corps Base Camp Lejeune in 1944.

With the 1st Marine Division, he served in the battles of Guam, Guadalcanal, and Okinawa. In March 1945, he received a citation from the Marine Corps when he rescued a Navy doctor from quicksand while they were searching for bananas.

After World War II ended, Osmanski was attached to the 2nd Marine Division serving as the occupying force in Nagasaki, Japan. On January 1, 1946, he captained the Isahaya Tigers in the Atom Bowl against Heisman Trophy winner Angelo Bertelli's Nagasaki Bears; after trailing 13–0 at halftime, Osmanski scored two fourth-quarter touchdowns. Although the two had promised to end the game in a tie to ensure troop morale remain high, Osmanski kicked the game-winning extra point in the 14–13 Tiger victory; when Bertelli confronted him, Osmanski apologized and remarked, "It was an act of God! [...] Either that, or force of habit."

== Return to Chicago ==
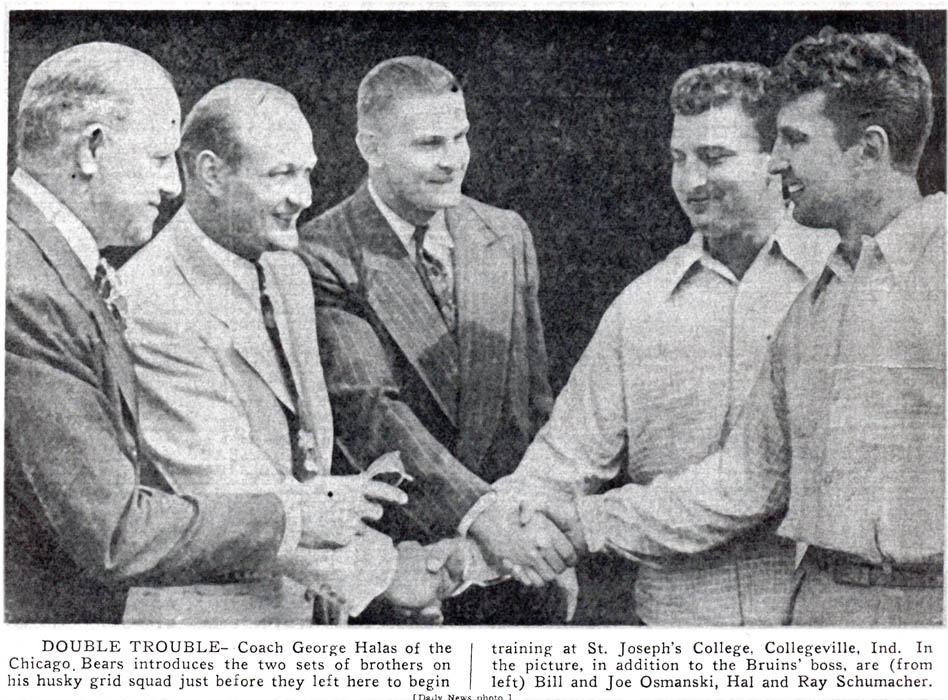
Osmanski (second from left) and his brother Joe (center) with George Halas (far left), and fellow brothers Harold and Raymond Schumacher.

Osmanski returned to the Bears in 1946, where he was joined by younger brother Joe in the backfield. The brothers and the Bears won the 1946 NFL Championship Game, Osmanski's fourth NFL title.

He retired in 1947.

== NFL career statistics ==
Legend
	Won the NFL Championship
	Led the league
**Bold**	Career high

=== Regular season ===
Year	Team	Games		Rushing					Receiving			
Year	Team	GP	GS	Att	Yds	Avg	Lng	TD	Rec	Yds	Avg	TD
1939	CHI	10	3	**121**	**699**	**5.8**	**86**	**7**	3	**65**	**21.7**	**1**
1940	CHI	8	6	50	192	3.8	68	3	1	13	13.0	0
1941	CHI	10	7	70	371	5.3	23	4	**4**	52	13.0	0
1942	CHI	1	1	2	9	4.5	14	0	0	0	0.0	0
1943	CHI	4	3	37	102	2.8	9	1	0	0	0.0	0
1946	CHI	9	4	78	343	4.4	20	5	**4**	40	10.0	0
1947	CHI	4	0	10	37	3.7	15	0	0	0	0.0	0
		46	24	368	1,753	4.8	86	20	12	170	14.2	1

=== Playoffs ===
Year	Team	Games		Rushing					Receiving			
Year	Team	GP	GS	Att	Yds	Avg	Lng	TD	Rec	Yds	Avg	TD
1940	CHI	1	1	10	**109**	**10.9**	**68**	**1**	0	0	0.0	0
1941	CHI	2	0	7	23	3.3	-	0	0	0	0.0	0
1942	CHI	1	0	**12**	32	2.7	14	0	0	0	0.0	0
1946	CHI	1	1	9	23	2.6	-	0	0	0	0.0	0
		5	2	38	187	4.9	68	1	0	0	0.0	0

== After retirement ==
After his retirement from the professional game, Osmanski became the head coach at his alma mater, Holy Cross. He coached the Crusaders for two seasons, 1948 and 1949, going 6–14.

During his playing years with the Bears, Osmanski attended dental school at Northwestern University. Following his coaching years, Osmanski opened a practice in Chicago. He also assisted in developing football mouthguards, and was the president of the Illinois Dental Society.

He died in Chicago on Christmas Day, 1996.

== Head coaching record ==
Year	Team	Overall	Conference	Standing	Bowl/playoffs
**Holy Cross Crusaders** (Independent) (1948–1949)
1948	Holy Cross	5–5			
1949	Holy Cross	1–9			
Holy Cross:		6–14			
Total:		6–14			
